= B.A.P discography =

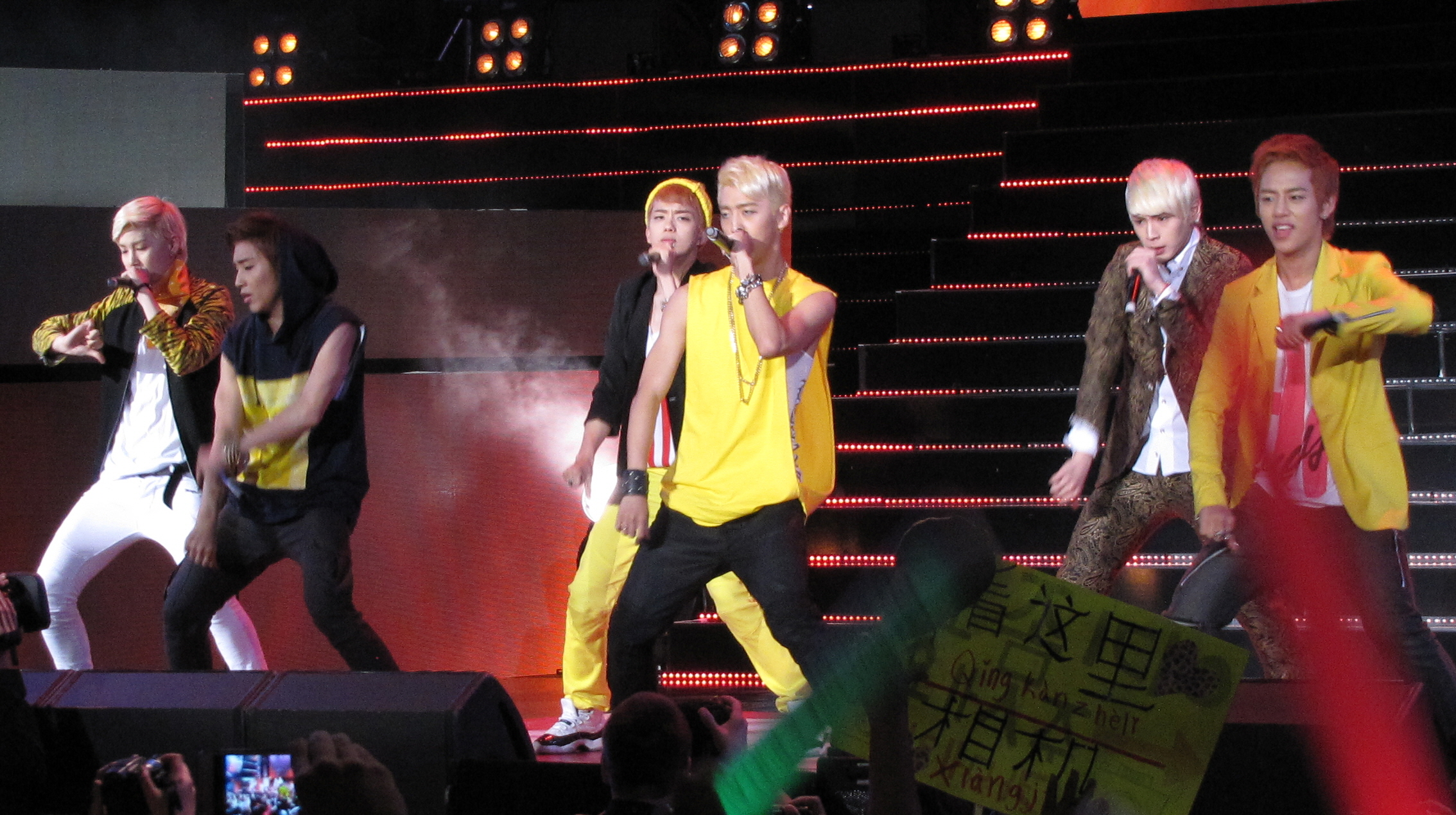
- B.A.P at KCON 2012 performing "No Mercy".
- Studio albums: 5
- Extended plays: 10
- Singles: 27
- Music videos: 31

The discography of the South Korean boy band B.A.P, consists of four studio albums, nine extended plays, and nineteen singles.

B.A.P released their debut EP Warrior in February 2012. It entered the Gaon Album Chart at number 3 and the Billboard World Albums Chart at number 10. Their follow-up EP Power peaked at number 2 on the Gaon Album Chart and number 10 on the Billboard World Albums Chart.

== Studio albums ==
=== Korean studio albums ===
List of Korean albums, showing selected details, selected chart positions, and sales figures
Title	Details	Peak chart positions			Sales
Title	Details	KOR	JPN	US World	Sales
First Sensibility	Released: February 4, 2014; Labels: TS Entertainment, LOEN Entertainment; Formats: CD, digital download, streaming	1	16	1	KOR: 104,528
Noir	Released: November 7, 2016; Labels: TS Entertainment, LOEN Entertainment; Formats: CD, digital download, streaming	2	39	1	KOR: 52,812; JPN: 3,092

=== Japanese studio albums ===
List of Japanese albums, showing selected details, selected chart positions, and sales figures
Title	Details	Peak chart positions	Sales
Title	Details	JPN	Sales
Best. Absolute. Perfect	Released: March 30, 2016; Label: King Records; Formats: CD, CD+DVD, digital download, streaming	4	JPN: 24,327
Unlimited	Released: June 28, 2017; Label: King Records; Formats: CD, CD+DVD, digital download, streaming	6	JPN: 21,710
Massive	Released: March 28, 2018; Label: King Records; Formats: CD, CD+DVD, digital download, streaming	6	JPN: 14,348

== Extended plays ==
List of extended plays, showing selected details, selected chart positions, and sales figures
Title	Details	Peak chart positions			Sales
Title	Details	KOR	JPN	US World	Sales
No Mercy	Released: July 19, 2012; Labels: TS Entertainment, LOEN Entertainment; Formats: CD, digital download, streaming	3	142	—	KOR: 57,124+ (Original & repackaged); JPN: 2,458+
No Mercy	Re-released: August 30, 2012 (Crash); Labels: TS Entertainment, LOEN Entertainment; Formats: CD, digital download	3	162	—	KOR: 57,124+ (Original & repackaged); JPN: 2,458+
One Shot	Released: February 13, 2013; Label: TS Entertainment, LOEN Entertainment; Format: CD, digital download, streaming	2	73	1	KOR: 86,386
Badman	Released: August 6, 2013; Labels: TS Entertainment, LOEN Entertainment; Formats: CD, digital download, streaming	3	—	1	KOR: 89,004
Matrix	Released: November 16, 2015; Labels: TS Entertainment, LOEN Entertainment; Formats: CD, digital download, streaming	1	—	3	KOR: 98,276
Carnival	Released: February 22, 2016; Labels: TS Entertainment, LOEN Entertainment; Formats: CD, digital download, streaming	2	48	3	KOR: 64,100; JPN: 1,891
Curtain Call (promoted as Bang & Jung & Yoo & Moon)	Released: August 8, 2024; Label: MA Entertainment; Formats: CD, digital download, streaming	3	23	—	KOR: 72,512; JPN: 2,752
"—" denotes a recording that did not chart or was not released in that territory

== Single albums ==
List of single albums, showing selected details, selected chart positions, and sales figures
Title	Details	Peak chart positions	Sales
Title	Details	KOR	Sales
Warrior	Released: January 26, 2012; Label: TS Entertainment; Format: CD, digital download, streaming	3	KOR: 42,261
Power	Released: April 27, 2012; Label: TS Entertainment; Format: CD, digital download, streaming	2	KOR: 38,650
Stop It	Released: October 23, 2012; Label: TS Entertainment; Formats: CD, digital download, streaming	3	KOR: 26,514
B.A.P Unplugged 2014	Released: June 10, 2014; Label: TS Entertainment; Formats: CD, digital download, streaming	2	KOR: 29,986
Put 'Em Up	Released: August 8, 2016; Label: TS Entertainment; Formats: CD, digital download, streaming	3	KOR: 29,165
Rose	Released: March 7, 2017; Label: TS Entertainment; Formats: CD, digital download, streaming	3	KOR: 43,836
Blue	Released: September 5, 2017; Label: TS Entertainment; Formats: CD, digital download, streaming	4	KOR: 26,470
Ego	Released: December 13, 2017; Label: TS Entertainment; Formats: CD, digital download, streaming	3	KOR: 30,606
Christmas With You	Released: December 18, 2024; Label: MA Entertainment; Formats: CD, digital download, streaming	5	KOR: 28,627

== Singles ==
=== Korean singles ===
List of Korean singles, showing year released, selected chart positions, sales figures, and name of the album
Title	Year	Peak chart positions						Sales	Album
Title	Year	KOR	KOR Hot	DL	JPN	JPN Hot	US World	Sales	Album
B.A.P
"Warrior"	2012	44	49	46	—	—	5	KOR (DL): 488,418	Warrior
"Secret Love" (featuring Song Jieun of Secret)	2012	132	68	—	—	—	—		Warrior
"Power"	2012	38	26	41	—	—	9	KOR (DL): 251,044	Power
"Goodbye"	2012	51	90	44	—	—	—	KOR (DL): 98,347	No Mercy
"No Mercy"	2012	40	30	42	—	—	10	KOR (DL): 435,697	No Mercy
"Crash"	2012	17	12	11	—	—	19	KOR (DL): 600,779	Crash
"Stop It"	2012	28	30	24	—	—	5	KOR (DL): 401,233	Stop It
"Rain Sound"	2013	15	16	8	—	—	5	KOR (DL): 265,421	One Shot
"One Shot"	2013	17	20	12	—	—	3	KOR (DL): 284,922	One Shot
"Coffee Shop"	2013	31	16	26	—	—	4	KOR (DL): 169,015	Badman
"Hurricane"	2013	39	32	29	—	—	4	KOR (DL): 79,757	Badman
"Badman"	2013	21	35	17	—	—	—	KOR (DL): 110,868	Badman
"1004 (Angel)"	2014	9	21	9	—	—	4	KOR (DL): 291,297	First Sensibility
"Where Are You? What Are You Doing?"	2014	27	33	19	—	—	6	KOR (DL): 101,634	B.A.P Unplugged 2014
"Young, Wild & Free"	2015	42	—N/a	34	—	—	6	KOR (DL): 45,201	Matrix
"Feel So Good"	2016	51	—N/a	27	—	—	10	KOR (DL): 64,655	Carnival
"That's My Jam"	2016	114	—N/a	89	—	—	7	KOR (DL): 13,131	Put 'Em Up
"Skydive"	2016	—	—N/a	96	—	—	9	KOR (DL): 16,585	Noir
"Wake Me Up"	2017	—	—N/a	95	—	—	4	KOR (DL): 16,401	Rose
"Honeymoon"	2017	—	—N/a	—	—	—	4	—N/a	Blue
"Hands Up"	2017	—	—N/a	—	—	—	7	—N/a	Ego
BANG&JUNG&YOO&MOON
"Farewell"	2024	—	—N/a	102	—	—	—N/a	—N/a	Curtain Call
"Gone"	2024	—	—N/a	25	—	—	—N/a	—N/a	Curtain Call
"Christmas With You"	2024	—	—N/a	57	—	—	—N/a	—N/a	Christmas With You
"—" denotes a recording that did not chart or was not released in that territory

=== Japanese singles ===
List of Japanese singles, showing year released, selected chart positions, sales figures, and name of the album
Title	Year	Peak chart positions		Sales	Album
Title	Year	JPN	JPN Hot	Sales	Album
"Warrior" (Japanese)	2013	5	17	JPN: 23,027	Best. Absolute. Perfect
"One Shot" (Japanese)	2013	10	30	JPN: 21,905	Best. Absolute. Perfect
"No Mercy" (Japanese)	2014	2	2	JPN: 42,116	Best. Absolute. Perfect
"Excuse Me"	2014	2	3	JPN: 51,697	Best. Absolute. Perfect
"Kingdom"	2016	—	—		Best. Absolute. Perfect
"Feel So Good" (Japanese)	2016	5	14	JPN: 17,358	Unlimited
"Fly High"	2016	7	12	JPN: 20,540	Unlimited
"Wake Me Up" (Japanese)	2017	4	11	JPN: 26,899	Massive
"Honey Moon" (Japanese)	2017	5	18	JPN: 15,853	Massive
"Hands Up" (Japanese)	2018	4	22	JPN: 16,762	Massive
"—" denotes a recording that did not chart or was not released in that territory

== Other charted songs ==
List of other charted songs, showing year released, selected chart positions, and name of the album
Title	Year	Peak chart positions	Album
Title	Year	KOR	Album
"It's All Lies"	2012	178	Power
"Voicemail"	2012	160	No Mercy
"What My Heart Tells Me To Do"	2012	168	No Mercy
"I Remember" (Yongguk solo; featuring Daehyun)	2012	136	Crash
"Yes Sir"	2012	188	Stop It
"Happy Birthday"	2012	152	Stop It
"Punch"	2013	100	One Shot
"Coma"	2013	90	One Shot
"0 (Zero)"	2013	89	One Shot
"Whut's Poppin'"	2013	183	Badman
"Excuse Me"	2013	142	Badman
"Bow Wow"	2013	141	Badman
"Easy(쉽죠)"	2014	79	First Sensibility
"With You"	2014	105	First Sensibility
"Love Sick"	2014	109	First Sensibility
"B.A.B.Y"	2014	110	First Sensibility
"Save Me"	2014	118	First Sensibility
"Shady Lady"	2014	121	First Sensibility
"Body & Soul"	2014	122	First Sensibility
"Spy"	2014	130	First Sensibility
"S.N.S"	2014	133	First Sensibility
"Check On"	2014	136	First Sensibility
"Bang X2"	2014	138	First Sensibility
"BAP"	2014	153	First Sensibility
"—" denotes a recording that did not chart or was not released in that territory

== Music videos ==
=== Korean music videos ===
Title	Year	Notes
"Warrior"	2012	Debut single.
"Secret Love"	2012	Follow-up promotion of debut single.
"Power"	2012	Second single.
"Goodbye"	2012	Pre-release single of first mini album.
"No Mercy"	2012	First mini album.
"Crash"	2012	First mini album repackage.
"Stop It"	2012	Third single.
"Rain Sound"	2013	Pre-release single of second mini album.
"One Shot"	2013	Second mini album.
"Coffee Shop"	2013	Pre-release single of third mini album.
"Hurricane"	2013	Pre-release single of third mini album.
"Badman"	2013	Third mini album.
"1004 (Angel)"	2014	Debut studio album.
"Where Are You? What Are You Doing?"	2014	Fourth single (non-promoted).
"Young, Wild & Free"	2015	Fourth mini album.
"Feel So Good"	2016	Fifth mini album.
"That's My Jam"	2016	Fifth single.
"Skydive"	2016	Second studio album.
"Wake Me Up"	2017	Sixth single album.
"Honeymoon"	2017	Seventh single album.
"Hands Up"	2017	Eighth single album.

=== Japanese music videos ===
Title	Year	Notes
"Warrior"	2013	Debut Japanese single.
"One Shot"	2013	Second Japanese single.
"No Mercy"	2014	Third Japanese single.
"Excuse Me"	2014	Fourth Japanese single.
"Kingdom"	2016	Debut Japanese album.
"Feel So Good"	2016	Fifth Japanese single.
"Fly High"	2016	Sixth Japanese single.
"Wake Me Up"	2017	Seventh Japanese single.
"Honeymoon"	2017	Eighth Japanese single.
"Hands Up"	2017	Ninth Japanese single.
