= Noir (B.A.P album) =

Studio album by B.A.P
- Released: November 7, 2016
- Recorded: 2016
- Genres: K-pop; hip hop; R&B
- Labels: TS Entertainment; LOEN Entertainment

B.A.P chronology
| Put 'Em Up (2016) | Noir (2016) | Rose (2017) |

Singles from Noir
- 1. "Skydive" Released: November 7, 2016

Music video
- "Skydive" on YouTube

Noir is the second studio album by the South Korean boy group B.A.P. It was released on November 7, 2016, under the label of TS Entertainment. "Skydive" was used as the lead single.

== Track listing ==
Official track list
| No. | Title | Lyrics | Music | Arrangement | Length |
|---|---|---|---|---|---|
| 1. | "Le Noir" | Bang Yongguk | Yongguk; Kim Changrak; Kang Kihoon (Clumsy); Lee Jiwoo (Clumsy) | Kang Kihoon (Clumsy); Lee Jiwoo (Clumsy) | 2:28 |
| 2. | "Skydive" | Yongguk; Mafly; Ponde; Rjanah; Dear.D | Jin Suk Choi; Tim Hawes; Obi Mhondera | Jin Suk Choi | 3:56 |
| 3. | "Ribbon In The Sky" | Yongguk; Kim Changrak | Yongguk; Kim Changrak | Yongguk; Kim Changrak | 3:27 |
| 4. | "Killer" | Yongguk; Kim Taewan | Ye-Yo!; Kim Taewan | Ye-Yo! | 3:33 |
| 5. | "Fermata" ( Himchan; Daehyun; Youngjae; Jongup) | Yongguk; Kim Changrak; Han Kyungsoo; Kim Seojung | Yongguk; Kim Changrak | Yongguk; Kim Changrak; Devil Cat | 3:23 |
| 6. | "Pray" (주소서 (Bang & Zelo)) | Yongguk; Zelo | Yongguk; Kim Changrak | Yongguk; Kim Changrak | 3:51 |
| 7. | "I Guess I Need U" | Yongguk; Zelo; Park Suseok; Kim Changrak; Park Eunwoo | Park Suseok; Kim Changrak | Park Suseok | 3:23 |
| 8. | "Chiquita" | Yongguk; Mafly; Keyfly; Kim Changrak | Erik Lidbom; Ylva Dimberg | Erik Lidbom | 2:54 |
| 9. | "Walking" (걸어가) | Roydo; Wonderkid; BreadBeat; Yongguk | Wonderkid; Roydo; Breadbeat | Wonderkid; Roydo; BreadBeat | 3:56 |
| 10. | "Now" (지금 (Jongup solo)) | Moon Jongup; Ha Jooho | Jongup; Ha Jooho | Park Suseok | 3:10 |
| 11. | "Kingdom (Korean ver.)" | Park Suseok; Park Eun-ooh; Sleepy | Park Suseok; Park Eun-ooh | Park Suseok; Park Eun-ooh | 3:50 |
| 12. | "Skydive (Inst.)" | | Jin Suk Choi; Tim Hawes; Obi Mhondera | Jin Suk Choi | 3:56 |
| 13. | "Fermata (Inst.)" | | Yongguk; Kim Changrak | Yongguk; Kim Changrak; Devil Cat | 3:23 |

== Promotion ==
Promotions for the album started on November 11, 2016, at Mnet's M Countdown and continued onto KBS2's Music Bank, MBC's Show! Music Core, SBS's Inkigayo, SBS MTV's The Show, and MBC Music's Show Champion.

== Other news ==
Bang Yong-guk, the leader of B.A.P, took a hiatus from musical activities and did not participate in the promotions of this album for health reasons.

== Charts ==
| Chart (2016) | Peak position |
|---|---|
| Billboard World Albums | 1 |
| Gaon Album Chart | 2 |
| Oricon Albums Chart | 39 |

== Awards and nominations ==
=== Music program awards ===
| Song | Program | Date |
|---|---|---|
| "Skydive" | The Show (SBS) | November 22, 2016 |

== Release history ==
| Region | Date | Format | Label |
|---|---|---|---|
| South Korea | November 7, 2016 | CD, digital download | TS Entertainment |
| Worldwide | November 7, 2016 | Digital download | TS Entertainment |
