= Stop It (single album) =

Single album by B.A.P
- Released: October 23, 2012
- Recorded: 2012
- Genres: Hip hop, R&B, pop
- Length: 8:10
- Language: Korean
- Label: TS Entertainment
- Producer: Duble Sidekick

B.A.P chronology
No Mercy (2012)	Stop It (2012)	One Shot (2013)

Singles from Stop It
- 1. "Stop It" Released: October 23, 2012

"Stop It" (하지마; Hajima) is the third single album by South Korean idol group B.A.P. It was released on October 23, 2012, under the label of TS Entertainment. The title track was produced by Duble Sidekick, who also produced Sistar's "Loving U" and MBLAQ's "It's War."

== Background and release ==
In early October, 2012, TS Entertainment stated that B.A.P were preparing for their new album. On October 15, teaser photos of Bang Yong-guk and Daehyun were released. These were followed by release of teaser photos of Jongup and Zelo on October 17 and Himchan's and Youngjae's on October 18. On October 23, B.A.P released their third single album, titled "Stop It", the sample of Let Me Clear My Throat by DJ Kool can be heard throughout the song. Together with a music video on TS Entertainment's YouTube channel. The third single album contains three tracks: "Yessir", "Stop It" and " Happy Birthday".

== Promotions ==
=== Live performances ===
B.A.P began promotions by first performing "Stop It" on Music Bank on October 26, 2012, followed by performances on Music Core on October 27, M! Countdown on November 1, and Inkigayo on November 4.

=== Music video ===
The music video was released on October 23, 2012, the same day as the digital single.

== Reception ==
With the release of the single, B.A.P rose as the top search term on sites like Naver, Daum, and other more. The single album peaked at spot 3 on Gaon Album Chart whereas the single itself peaked at spot 28 on Gaon Single Chart.

== Track listing ==
Korean single

No.	Title	Lyrics	Music	Length
1.	"Yessir"	Marco, Jeon Daun, Bang Yongguk	Marco, Jeon Daun	1:13
2.	"하지마 (Stop It)"	Duble Sidekick, Bang Yongguk	Duble Sidekick, Kim Heewon	3:23
3.	"Happy Birthday"	Park Suseok, Bang Yongguk	Park Suseok	3:34
Total length:				8:10

== Credits and personnel ==
- Bang Yong Guk – vocals, rap
- Choi Jun Hong (Zelo) – vocals, rap
- Jung Dae Hyun – vocals
- Yoo Young Jae – vocals
- Kim Him Chan – vocals
- Moon Jong Up – vocals
- Duble Sidekick – producer, songwriting, music

== Charts ==
Chart	Peak position
South Korea (Gaon Singles Chart)	28
Billboard K-pop Hot 100	30

=== Sales ===
Chart	Sales
Gaon physical sales	26,514+

== Release history ==
Country	Date	Format	Label
Worldwide	October 23, 2012	Digital download	TS Entertainment
South Korea	October 23, 2012	Digital download	TS Entertainment
