= Us (EP) =

EP by Moon Jong-up
- Released: July 8, 2021
- Recorded: 2020–2021
- Genres: Pop, hip-hop, dance
- Length: 15:42
- Language: Korean
- Labels: Big Ocean ENM, Sony Music Korea

Moon Jong-up chronology
Headache (2020)	Us (2021)	Some (2023)

Singles from Us
- 1. "Headache" Released: May 7, 2020; 2. "Find" Released: July 1, 2021; 3. "Us" Released: July 8, 2021

Us (stylized in all caps) is the first mini-album by South Korean singer Moon Jong-up. It was released on July 8, 2021, by Big Ocean ENM and distributed by Sony Music Korea. Following the release of his debut single album Headache and its title track in May 2020, Moon focused on defining his musical direction, which resulted in him working on the record for a year. He crafted an album which incorporates pop, hip hop, and dance music.

Preceding the mini-album's availability, "Find" featuring Moon Sujin was issued as a single a week prior. Following a series of photo and video teasers, Us and its lead single of the same name were concurrently released. Moon promoted the song by performing it on music chart programs across various television networks. The mini-album peaked at number 47 on South Korea's national Gaon Album Chart.

== Background ==
"You and I could be two separate individuals, but the moment we get to know each other better, we become 'us'."

— Moon on the mini-album title

Moon released his debut solo single album Headache and its title track on May 7, 2020. He attributed the long gap between releases to working with his agency to mold his musical direction, expressing regret in the greed to release his debut single with a new company. With the inclusion of songs demonstrating diverse stories and genres, he intended to "show my colors as a solo artist". He described Us as a his real start because it "has more of 'me' in it." The album title was chosen to reflect the songs' theme of a love confession. The project was recorded over the course of a year and Moon participated in the songwriting of the new material. He was also involved in the making of the album cover, as well as bringing together the music video and dance teams. Feeling a gradual rise in his weight, the singer lost 5 kg (11 lb) in preparation for the forthcoming promotional cycle.

Moon's first performance of "Photo" took place while he was a member of B.A.P during their Live on Earth 2016 World Tour. It had not previously been issued on any of the group's albums. When discussions for the track's inclusion on his solo record occurred, he thought about having former bandmate Bang Yong-guk take part in the song. Towards the end of Bang's tenure in mandatory military service, the pair communicated about constructing the piece. Moon crafted a version with a new arrangement and, following Bang's discharge, they further developed the song; it was re-recorded with Bang providing a rap verse.

After making his debut as a soloist, Moon contacted Moon Soojin, both of whom are alumni from the same middle school, and learned that she also ventured in music. The two became acquainted and jointly worked on "Find". They crafted the song with MIN, Moon Jong-up's longtime friend. Moon worked with songwriter Ryan S. Jhun, who previously co-wrote IU's "Celebrity" and Oh My Girl's "Dolphin". The singer received songs from Jhun and chose "Us" as his favorite among them. When penning the lyrics, Moon wanted to "embody the feeling of when someone confesses to the other and the progression of their relationship." The song was then completed with the composers. In 2019, Moon was a contestant on the survival reality show Signhere, where he collaborated with the MBA crew and met rapper EK. Moon contacted him to work on "Go Up" together.

== Music structure ==
Us comprises various music genres, including pop, hip hop, and dance music. The record opens with "Photo", which features Bang Yong-guk. "Find" is an R&B song that features vocalist Moon Sujin. It is a slow-tempo piece with a "chill vibe" that incorporates rough drums over a soft piano. The lyrics convey the yearning to form relationships with others, including family and friends. "Us" is a minimalist Scandipop track with R&B vocals centered around a guitar and bass groove. The mini-album closes with the pop-funk number "Headache" featuring Yunhway, which Moon described as refreshing and bright.

== Release and promotion ==
On June 24, 2021, Big Ocean ENM posted a teaser poster across social networking services announcing Moon's forthcoming mini-album entitled Us. A promotion scheduler was published the following day to initiate a countdown leading up to the album's release. For the next two consecutive days, the agency uploaded separate pre-review videos: in the first, Moon's former bandmates Yoo Young-jae and Zelo reacted to the title track; three fans of B.A.P participated in the second session. Big Ocean ENM published a music video teaser for "Find" on June 30, which was made available on digital music stores as a pre-release the subsequent day. From July 2, a concept film for Us and three sets of dual concept photos were posted in four successive days.

A fan meeting entitled Summer in the Moon: Moon Jong-up took place on July 3, where he performed album tracks and unveiled the music video for "Us". A highlight medley of Us was shared two days ahead of its release, as well as a music video teaser on the ensuing day. The mini-album and its title track were concurrently issued on July 8. Moon began promoting "Us" on weekly music chart shows that same day. He performed the single on Mnet's M Countdown, KBS2's Music Bank, Seoul Broadcasting System's (SBS) Inkigayo, SBS MTV's The Show, MBC M's Show Champion, and MBC's Show! Music Core. Moon completed promotions on July 26.

== Critical reception and commercial performance ==
Us received favorable reviews from all three critics from TV Daily. Kim Ji-ha felt that the song selection suited Moon well, while Park Sang-hu took note of his musical growth. Kim Han-kil stated that the album proved Moon's capabilities to perform as a soloist. On the chart dated July 4–10, 2021, Us debuted at number 47 on South Korea's national Gaon Album Chart.

== Track listing ==
Us
No.	Title	Lyrics	Music	Arrangement	Length
1.	"Photo" (featuring Bang Yong-guk)	Moon Jong-up, Bang Yong-guk, Ha Ju-ho	Moon Jong-up, Bang Yong-guk, Ha Ju-ho	Moon Jong-up, Bang Yong-guk, Ha Ju-ho, Kim Do-yun	3:03
2.	"Find" (featuring Moon Sujin)	Moon Jong-up, Moon Sujin, MIN	Moon Jong-up, Moon Sujin, MIN, Bymore	Moon Jong-up, MIN, Bymore	3:22
3.	"Us"	Moon Jong-up, Ryan S. Jhun, Jeppe London, Lauritz Emil Christiansen, Celine Svanbäck, Stefan Hjort	Ryan S. Jhun, Jeppe London, Lauritz Emil Christiansen, Celine Svanbäck, Stefan Hjort	Ryan S. Jhun, Jeppe London, Lauritz Emil Christiansen	2:59
4.	"Go Up" (featuring EK)	Moon Jong-up, EK, MIN	Moon Jong-up, EK, MIN	Moon Jong-up, EK, MIN, Alawn	3:14
5.	"Headache" (featuring Yunhway)	Yunhway, Moon Seo-lee	HSND, Saka_Zan, Frederik Jyll, Foundboy, Nano, Singing Beetle	Yunhway, HSND, Saka_Zan, Foundboy	3:04
Total length:					15:42

Notes

- "Go Up" is stylized as "GOUP".

== Chart ==
Chart (2021)	Peak position
South Korean Albums (Gaon)	47
