= Matrix (EP) =

- Album Cover of Matrix

EP by B.A.P
- Released: November 16, 2015
- Recorded: 2015
- Genre: Hip hop; R&B
- Length: 15:51
- Label: TS Entertainment; LOEN Entertainment

B.A.P chronology
First Sensibility (2014)	Matrix (EP) (2015)	Carnival (2016)

Singles from Matrix (Album)
- 1. "Young, Wild & Free" Released: November 16, 2015

Matrix is the fourth extended play by South Korean boy group B.A.P. It was released on November 16, 2015 by TS Entertainment and distributed by LOEN Entertainment. It features the lead single "Young, Wild & Free". It peaked at #3 on the Gaon charts.

== Track listing ==
No.	Title	Lyrics	Music	Arrangement	Length
1.	"Take You There"	B.A.P; Kim Tae-wan for Groove Network; Kevin	Ye-Yo!; Kim Tae-wan for Groove Network; Kevin	Ye-Yo!	3:26
2.	"Monologue"	Bang Yong-guk; Zelo; Kim Chang-rak	Bang; Kim Chang-rak	Bang; Kim Chang-rak	1:30
3.	"Young, Wild & Free"	Bang; Kim Chang-rak	Bang; Kim Chang-rak	Bang; Kim Chang-rak	3:09
4.	"Be Happy"	Bang; Kim Chang-rak; Sleepy	Bang; Kim Chang-rak	Bang; Kim Chang-rak	3:35
5.	"Blind"	Bang; Park Su-seok; iNoo	Park Su-seok; iNoo	Park Su-seok; iNoo	3:58
