= Badman (EP) =

- Cover art of the EP

EP by B.A.P
- Released: August 6, 2013
- Recorded: 2013
- Genre: Hip hop; R&B
- Length: 20:08
- Language: Korean
- Label: TS Entertainment; LOEN Entertainment

B.A.P chronology
| One Shot (2013) | Badman (2013) | First Sensibility (2014) |

Singles from Badman
- 1. "Coffee Shop" Released: June 28, 2013; 2. "Hurricane" Released: July 17, 2013; 3. "Badman" Released: August 6, 2013

Badman is the third extended play by South Korean boy group B.A.P. It was released on August 6, 2013, under the record label of TS Entertainment and distributing label of LOEN Entertainment. It charted number 1 on the Billboard World album Charts.

== Production ==
Along with revelation of the album name and its track listing on July 28, 2013, TS Entertainment hinted that the Badman EP would "contain music that only B.A.P can do... [it] is supposed to have genres they never tried before in the album." The agency had also stated before that there were going to be three promotional singles from the upcoming third EP.

"Coffee Shop", the EP's lead single, was written and produced by the record producer duo of Kang Ji-won and Kim Ki-bum, who have previously worked on successful hits with other artists from record label of TS Entertainment, including Secret, as well as B.A.P themselves for "Warrior", "Power", and "One Shot". The group also collaborated with the pianist Song Young-joo for the instrumental part of the track. B.A.P travelled to several sites in the United States to shoot scenes for music video of the song, including Los Angeles, Las Vegas, Santa Monica, San Francisco, Washington, D.C., and New York City.

"Hurricane", the next single, was produced and written by record producers, Marco and Jun Da-woon, who had worked with TS Entertainment in the past on various projects. They had collaborated with Secret on "Calling U" from their third extended play Poison (Secret EP) and "Only U" from their fourth extended play Letter from Secret. The duo had also produced songs for B.A.P, such as "Punch" from their second extended play One Shot as well as single "No Mercy". Marco and Jun Da-woon also penned the lyrics of the song while B.A.P's rapper and leader Bang Yong Guk contributed to the rap part of the song. B.A.P had travelled to United States to shoot the scenes for music video of the song, visiting several different places in Las Vegas.

The final single, "Badman" was written and produced by Kang Ji-won and Kim Ki-bum. B.A.P's Bang Yong-guk confirmed his part in writing the song: "I thought it was unfortunate that you always hear about criminals every time you turn on the news, making society feel scary and unsafe. I wanted to bring awareness. I feel that there are so many big issues that we should not forget about yet we forget them so easily. I felt that no one else would convey these messages about society if we didn't do it..." B.A.P filmed the music video in the city of Detroit, Michigan. An estimated hundred extras, and internet personality Elijah Daniel, were brought in for the filming and the music video was directed by Hong Won-ki of ZanyBros. The video was released on August 5, 2013.

== Release and promotion ==
The music video for "Coffee Shop" was uploaded on the official YouTube channel of TS Entertainment on June 27, 2013. The single itself was released digitally on June 28, 2013.

B.A.P member Youngjae mentioned July 17, 2013, as the release date of the next single, "Hurricane", on his Twitter account on July 9. On July 17, 2013, the music video for "Hurricane" was uploaded on the official YouTube channel of TS Entertainment, which featured the boys voyaging the streets and casinos in of Las Vegas. The single itself was released digitally the same day.

The title of the third single, "Badman", and the track list, cover art and release date for their third extended play, Badman were and revealed on July 28, 2013. In the following dates, several individual concept shots and group teaser images were unveiled. "Badman" was not released as a separate digital single like "Coffee Shop" and "Hurricane", however, all three songs were included in EP and "Badman" was chosen as the lead single for the promotional activities following the release of the EP.

The EP was released online on August 5, 2014, and offline on August 6.

== Critical reception ==
Grace Danbi Hong of M! Wave gave "Coffee Shop" a rating of 4.5 out of 5 and called it bittersweet, simple and relaxing. She praised the 'elegant' sound brought by the jazz pianist Song Young-joo "which slowly fills the emptiness around until there's just no more room... and yet, we don't feel suffocated..." Hong went on to praise the 'beautiful' visuals of the music video and the members for "pushing the pause button in some of the busiest cities in the US."

== Track listing ==
Badman EP
| No. | Title | Lyrics | Music | Arrangement | Length |
|---|---|---|---|---|---|
| 1. | "Whut's Poppin'" | Marco; Bang Yong-guk | Marco; Bang | Marco | 1:50 |
| 2. | "Badman" | Kang Ji-won; Kim Ki-bum | Kang Ji-won; Kim Ki-bum | Kang Ji-won | 3:47 |
| 3. | "Excuse Me" | Park Su-seok; Sleepy | Park Su-seok; Sleepy | Park Su-seok; Sleepy | 3:35 |
| 4. | "Coffee Shop" | Bang; Kang Ji-won; Kim Ki-bum | Kang Ji-won; Kim Ki-bum | Kang Ji-won; Kim Ki-bum | 3:39 |
| 5. | "Bow Wow" | Bang; Park Su-seok; iNoo | Bang; Park Su-seok | | 3:37 |
| 6. | "Hurricane" | Bang; Jeon Da-woon; Marco | Jeon Da-woon; Marco | Jeon Da-woon; Marco | 3:32 |
| Total length: | | | | | 20:08 |
