= B.A.P Live on Earth 2014 Continent Tour =

2014 concert tour by B.A.P

- World tour by B.A.P
- Promotional posters for the tour
- Associated album: First Sensibility
- Start date: March 8, 2014
- End date: June 28, 2014
- No. of shows: 23

B.A.P concert chronology
- B.A.P 1st Japan Tour Warrior Begins (2013); B.A.P Live on Earth 2014 Continent Tour (2014); B.A.P Live on Earth 2016 World Tour (2016)

B.A.P Live on Earth 2014 Continent Tour was a 2014 concert tour headlined by the South Korean boyband B.A.P. The tour was held from March to June 2014 in Seoul, New York, Dallas, Chicago, Los Angeles, Düsseldorf, Paris, London, Melbourne, Sydney, Taipei, Singapore, Fukuoka, Nagoya, Osaka, Chiba, and Bangkok. The concert's main theme was 'Earth Needs You,' and six keywords (Justice, Emotion, Passion, Love, Happiness, and You) related to the theme made up the continuity.

A week before the start of their South American leg, TS Entertainment released an official statement canceling B.A.P's tour in South America due to insufficient time for the artists to rest and recharge. TS Entertainment stated that they placed their artists condition as top priority when canceling this tour.

== Reception ==
On March 9, B.A.P's Seoul concert was broadcast in movie theaters in Taiwan, Hong Kong, and Japan. It is estimated that 20,000 global fans were able to view the concert in real-time with B.A.P. After 11 months, BAP returned to America with their first stop in New York city selling out. The European leg of the tour was the largest concert tour by a Korean artist in Europe at the time, with 20,000 fans expected to attend.

"The six B.A.P boys exceeded all my expectations by proving that they are not just an average K-pop boy band. It's rare to find a group where each member can not only dance, but is also an incredible singer, but B.A.P has that one down. B.A.P had a powerful stage presence that no one at the concert is soon to forget!"

— DramaFever

About this tour Bang Yong Guk, the group's leader said:

"More cities and countries have been added to our tour this year so we're really excited. That's probably the biggest change, the scale and size of the tour versus last year. I think we've added new images that we haven't been able to show in our past concerts. So, with our upgraded setlist our show will be more diverse."

— Billboard

== Setlist ==
South Korea (March 8–9, 2014)

Main Set
Act 1 (Justice)

1. "One Shot"
2. "Badman"
3. "Power"

Act 2 (Love)

1. "Lovesick"
2. "Coffee Shop"
3. "Body & Soul"

Act 3 (Passion)

1. "Punch"
2. "No Mercy"
3. "Bangx2"

Act 4 (Emotion)

1. "Rain Sound"
2. "Jongup Solo Dance Stage"
3. "Save Me"

Act 5 (Happiness)

1. "Check On"
2. "Excuse Me"
3. "Spy"
4. "Hurricane"
5. "Dancing in the Rain"
6. "Stop it"
7. "Crash"

Encore

1. "1004"
2. "Warrior"
3. "With You"

== Concerts ==
Date	City	Country	Venue
Asia
March 8, 2014	Seoul	South Korea	SK Olympic Handball Gymnasium
March 9, 2014	Seoul	South Korea	SK Olympic Handball Gymnasium
North America
April 13, 2014	New York City	United States	Best Buy Theater
April 16, 2014	Grand Prairie	United States	Verizon Theatre at Grand Prairie
April 19, 2014	Chicago	United States	Star Plaza Theater
April 22, 2014	Los Angeles	United States	Nokia Theatre L.A. Live
Europe
April 27, 2014	London	United Kingdom	Brixton Academy
April 30, 2014	Paris	France	Zénith de Paris
May 3, 2014	Düsseldorf	Germany	Mitsubishi Electric Halle
Oceania
May 8, 2014	Melbourne	Australia	Festival Hall
May 10, 2014	Sydney	Australia	Luna Park Sydney Big Top
Asia
May 18, 2014	Taipei	Taiwan	Nangang 101
May 31, 2014	Singapore		The Star Performing Arts Centre
June 4, 2014	Fukuoka	Japan	Fukuoka Sunpalace
June 5, 2014	Fukuoka	Japan	Fukuoka Sunpalace
June 10, 2014	Nagoya	Japan	Nagoya Congress Center Century Hall
June 11, 2014	Nagoya	Japan	Nagoya Congress Center Century Hall
June 13, 2014	Osaka	Japan	Osaka International Convention Center
June 14, 2014	Osaka	Japan	Osaka International Convention Center
June 15, 2014	Osaka	Japan	Osaka International Convention Center
June 21, 2014	Chiba	Japan	Makuhari Messe
June 22, 2014	Chiba	Japan	Makuhari Messe
June 28, 2014	Bangkok	Thailand	Siam Paragon Royal Paragon Hall 2-3
