= Carnival (B.A.P EP) =

- Album Cover of Carnival

EP by B.A.P
- Released: February 22, 2016
- Recorded: 2015–2016
- Genres: Hip hop; R&B
- Length: 17:57
- Labels: TS Entertainment; LOEN Entertainment

B.A.P chronology
| Matrix (2015) | Carnival (B.A.P EP) (2016) | Best.Absolute.Perfect (2016) |

Singles from Carnival (EP)
- 1. "Feel So Good" Released: February 22, 2016

Carnival is the fifth extended play by the South Korean boy group B.A.P. It was released on February 22, 2016, by TS Entertainment and distributed by LOEN Entertainment. It features the lead single "Feel So Good". It peaked at #2 on the Gaon Music Chart.

== Track listing ==
| No. | Title | Lyrics | Music | Arrangement | Length |
|---|---|---|---|---|---|
| 1. | "Today" | Park Su-seok; Park Eun-woo | Park Su-seok; Park Eun-woo | Park Su-seok | 1:25 |
| 2. | "Carnival" | Bang Yong-guk; Kim Chang-rak; Park Su-seok | Bang; Kim Chang-rak; Park Su-seok; Yoon Young-min | Park Su-seok; Yoon Young-min | 3:04 |
| 3. | "Feel So Good" | Bang; Kim Chang-rak; Team One Sound | Bang; Danny Majic; Kim Chang-rak; Team One Sound; Artisans Premium Music; Lucas Lee | Bang; Kim Chang-rak | 3:17 |
| 4. | "Go" | Bang; Star Track | Bang; Star Track | Star Track | 3:32 |
| 5. | "Albatross" | Bang; Kim Chang-rak; Zelo | Bang; Kim Chang-rak | Bang; Kim Chang-rak | 3:16 |
| 6. | "My Girl" | Bang; Park Su-seok; iNoo | Park Su-seok | Park Su-seok; iNoo | 3:27 |
