= Curtain Call (EP) =

- Digital and physical versions

EP by Bang & Jung & Yoo & Moon
- Released: August 8, 2024
- Genre: K-pop
- Length: 17:10
- Labels: MA; Warner Music Korea
- Producers: Bang Yong-guk; 1Take (Newtype); 8Pex Company

Bang & Jung & Yoo & Moon chronology
Massive (2018)	Curtain Call (2024)	Christmas With You (2024)

Singles from Curtain Call
- 1. "Farewell" Released: July 15, 2024; 2. "Gone" Released: August 8, 2024

Curtain Call is the sixth and final extended play by South Korean boy group, B.A.P, promoted under the name of Bang & Jung & Yoo & Moon due to trademark issues. It is the group's first release since their disbandment in 2019, as well as the group's first release not to feature Zelo and Himchan.

== Background ==
On June 12, 2024, BJYM announced a documentary titled "Man on the Moon". The teaser for the documentary included an announcement for a group comeback, marking the group's first activities since the release of "Ego" in 2018. On July 5, the group revealed their schedule for their upcoming album, Curtain Call, which showed they would be promoting under their real names rather than the B.A.P. name. Member Zelo was unable to participate in the comeback as a result of his military service.

The group performed their first stage promoting the comeback at Ilchi Music Hall in Cheongdam-dong, Seoul.

== Track listing ==
Curtain Call track listing
No.	Title	Lyrics	Music	Arrangement/Producer(s)	Length
1.	"Love"	Bang Yong-guk; Coup D'etat; COE	Bang; Coup D'etat; COE; Dyoi	Bang; Coup D'etat; Dyoi	3:37
2.	"Farewell" (빛바랜 날들 이젠 잊고 다 안녕)	Bang; Coup D'etat; COE	Bang; Coup D'etat; COE; Dyoi	Bang; Coup D'etat; Dyoi	3:15
3.	"Gone"	Bang; Coup D'etat; COE	Bang; Coup D'etat; COE	Bang; Coup D'etat; Dyoi	3:19
4.	"Stand It All"	Bang; Chase (Newtype); 1Take (Newtype)	Chase (Newtype); 1Take (Newtype)	1Take (Newtype); Chase (Newtype); Bang	3:25
5.	"Way Back"	Yoo Young-jae; Bang; Hahm	Aaron Kim; Hahm; T.O.D; Bang	Hahm; Kim; 8Pex Company	3:34
Total length:					17:10

== Charts ==
=== Weekly charts ===
Weekly chart performance for Curtain Call
Chart (2024)	Peak position
Japanese Albums (Oricon)	23
Japanese Combined Albums (Oricon)	37
South Korean Albums (Circle)	3

=== Monthly charts ===
Monthly chart performance for Curtain Call
Chart (2024)	Position
South Korean Albums (Circle)	19
