= Kim Is a Genius =

2019 South Korean web series

- Hangul: 김슬기 천재
- Lit.: Kim Seul-gi, The Genius
- RR: Gim Seulgi cheonjae
- MR: Kim Sŭlgi ch'ŏnjae
- Genre: Drama; Fantasy
- Directed by: Kim Min-ji
- Starring: Yoo Young-jae; Park Soo-ah; Jung Sung-ho; Choi Moon-hee
- Country of origin: South Korea
- Original language: Korean

Production
- Producer: Kim Min-ji
- Camera setup: Single-camera
- Production companies: JTBC; Drama House

Original release
- Network: JTBC
- Release: November 2019

Kim Is a Genius (Korean: 김슬기 천재) is a South Korean comedy, designed for an interactive phone-based experience, starring Yoo Young-jae, Park Soo-ah, Jung Sung-ho and Choi Moon-hee. The project was announced mid-2018 and premiered May 17, 2019 via an iOS and Android App.

== Synopsis ==
Kim Is a Genius follows the peculiar happenings at Fisher-King, a viral marketing company whose (largely incompetent) employees come to depend on a number of mysterious smart-phone apps providing unusual and improbable services — from allowing users to see through photoshopped images to analyzing the content of the food they eat. Each episode is viewed as though through the phone of one character, from the hapless but handsome Chadol Chun to the ultra-competent but borderline-sociopathic Yeon-seop Kim.

== Cast ==
=== Main ===
- Yoo Young-jae as Chadol Chun

The youngest member of Fisher-King's Black Ops marketing team. His remarkable beauty commends an online cult following, despite him being functionally illiterate.

- Park Soo-ah as Gwanji Song

Once known for providing candids of K-Pop idols to their fans, she now specialises in trolling viral ad campaigns.

- Jung Sung-ho as Seonggu Do

The Black Ops team's boss, whose middle-aged attempts to pass for cool inspire the daily derision of those around him.

- Choi Moon-hee as Kim Yeon-seop

In her own head, at least, the only person at Fisher-King capable of getting anything done.
