= Sonamoo =

South Korean girl group

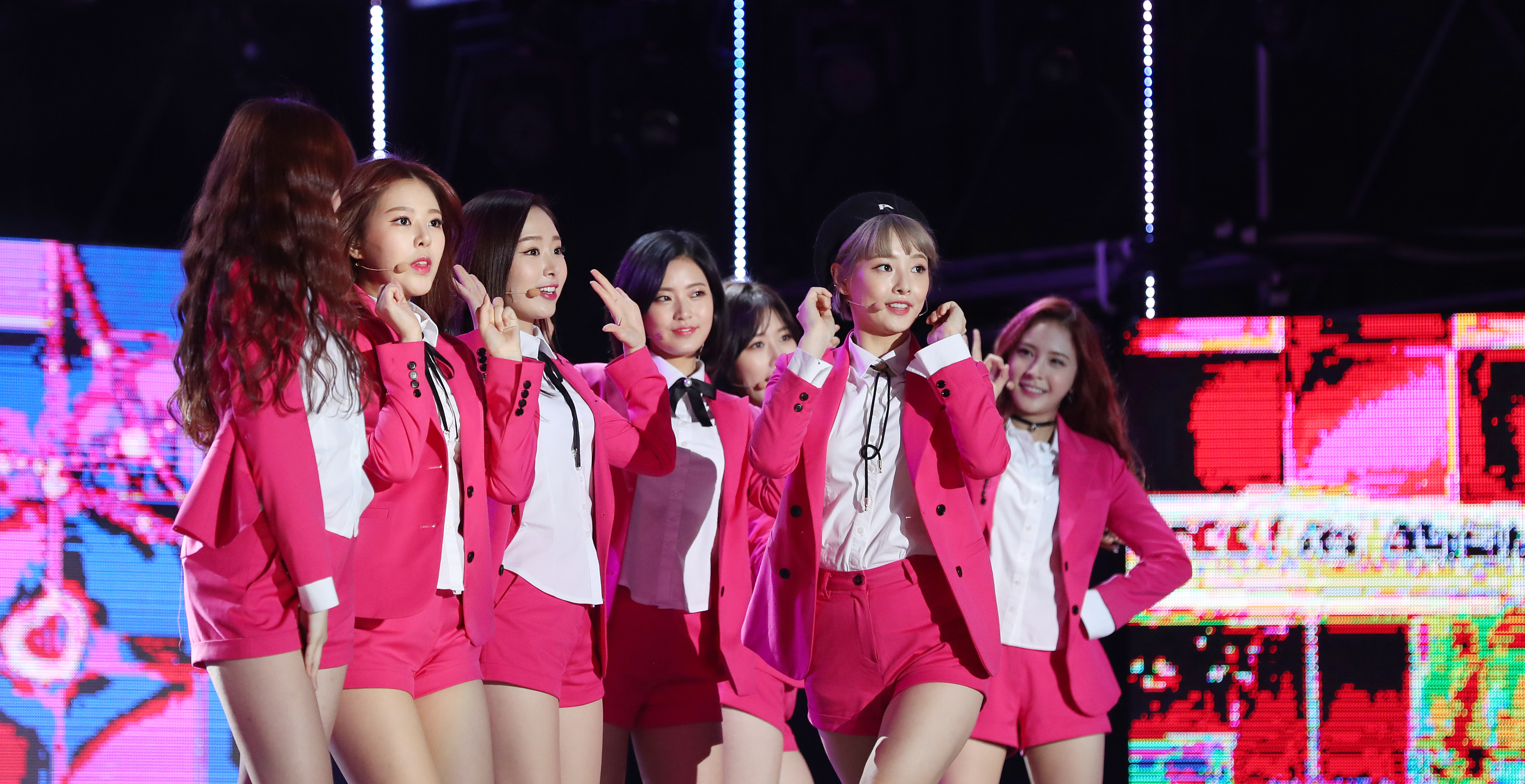
- Sonamoo in September 2016; From left to right: Su Min, High.D, Min Jae, D.ana, Eui Jin, New Sun and Na Hyun.

Background information
- Origin: Seoul, South Korea
- Genres: K-pop; hip hop; dance-pop
- Years active: 2014–2021
- Label: TS
- Members: Sumin; Minjae; D.ana; Nahyun; Euijin; High.D; NewSun

Sonamoo (Korean: 소나무; lit. 'Pine Tree'; stylized in allcaps) was a South Korean girl group formed by TS Entertainment. Sonamoo was originally a seven-member group; members Sumin and Nahyun left the group in 2019 after they filed a lawsuit to terminate the contracts with their company. They made their debut on 29 December 2014, with the extended play, Deja Vu.

== Career ==
=== 2014–2015: Debut and further mini-album releases ===
On 29 December 2014, Sonamoo officially debuted with the release of their debut EP Deja Vu and single of the same name, and held their debut showcase performance. The album debuted at the number one spot on Gaon's weekly Album Chart. On 25 February 2015, they promoted "Just Go" as the second single off of their debut album.

On 20 July 2015, Sonamoo released their second extended play Cushion. The lead single of the same name was co-produced by EastWest and ₩uNo, who is known for being the former member of Speed, Taewoon. Members D.ana and NewSun also contributed to the writing of rap portions for two tracks: "Deep" and "Let's Make A Movie". On 1 September 2015, they followed up their Cushion promotions by promoting "Round N Round" as the second single from the album.

=== 2016–2021: Nahyun & Sumin's lawsuits, TS shutdown and disbandment ===
On 29 June 2016, the group released their third extended play I Like U Too Much, with the title track of the same name. The album presented a new side of the group with a brighter "girls next door" image compared to their debut concepts which the members themselves called "dark". The group cited they looked up to Girls' Generation for inspiration with this album.

On 9 January 2017, the group released their first single album I Think I Love U. The lead single of the same name is a brighter dance track produced by Shin Hyuk, who has previously worked with SHINee and EXO.

On 27 July, TS Entertainment unveiled a teaser image for Sonamoo's Happy Box Project, revealing that the group will be releasing three singles over the course of several months. The first single "Friday Night" was released on 14 August. The rap portion of the single is written by NewSun.

Member Euijin was confirmed to be a contestant on KBS Idol Rebooting Project The Unit, which first aired on 28 October 2017. On 6 November, Sonamoo continued their Happy Box Project releasing their single "I (Knew It)". The single is a medium tempo dance track composed by hitmaker e.one, who has previously worked with Wonder Girls.

As of 23 September 2019, both Nahyun and Sumin have filed lawsuits seeking to terminate their contract with TS Entertainment.

In January 2021, Sonamoo's label, TS Entertainment, privately shut down and deleted its website, leaving the fate of the group unknown.

On 9 September 2021, Euijin signed a contract with Mellow Entertainment, confirming that she had left TS Entertainment and the group. On 11 September, Minjae and NewSun also confirmed that they have left the company. On 13 September, D.ana confirmed she had also left the company. In her statement, she mentioned that Sonamoo's activities had come to an end. On 30 December, High.D confirmed that she has left the company and the group.

== Past members ==
- Sumin (수민) – leader, sub-vocal
- Minjae (민재) – main vocal
- D.ana (디애나) – low rap
- Nahyun (나현) – sub-vocal, lead dancer
- Euijin (의진) – performance, lead vocal
- High.D (하이디) – main vocal
- NewSun (뉴썬) – high rap

== Discography ==
=== Extended plays ===
List of extended plays, with selected chart positions and sales
Title	Album details	Peak chart positions	Sales
Title	Album details	KOR	Sales
Deja Vu	Released: 29 December 2014; Label: TS Entertainment; Format: CD, digital download	1	KOR: 4,260+
Cushion	Released: 20 July 2015; Label: TS Entertainment; Format: CD, digital download	7	KOR: 4,196+
I Like U Too Much	Released: 29 June 2016; Label: TS Entertainment; Format: CD, digital download	7	KOR: 4,387+

=== Single albums ===
Title	Album details	Peak chart positions	Sales
Title	Album details	KOR	Sales
I Think I Love U	Released: 9 January 2017; Label: TS Entertainment, LOEN Entertainment; Format: CD, digital download	13	KOR: 4,018+

=== Singles ===
Title	Year	Peak chart positions	Sales (DL)	Album
Title	Year	KOR	Sales (DL)	Album
"Deja Vu"	2014	—	KOR: 10,474	Deja Vu
"Cushion"	2015	—	KOR: 15,837	Cushion
"I Like U Too Much" (넘나 좋은 것)	2016	157	KOR: 23,413	I Like U Too Much
"I Think I Love U" (나 너 좋아해?)	2017	—	—N/a	I Think I Love U
"Friday Night" (금요일밤)	2017	—	—N/a	Happy Box Part.1
"I (Knew It)"	2017	—	—N/a	Happy Box Part.2
"—" denotes releases that did not chart or were not released in that region.

=== Soundtrack appearances ===
Title	Year	Peak chart positions	Sales (DL)	Album
Title	Year	KOR	Sales (DL)	Album
"First Kiss"	2016	—	—N/a	The Miracle OST
"Keep On" (자꾸자꾸)	2017	—	—N/a	Sing For You OST
"We Are Legendary" (위아 레전더리)	2019	—	—N/a	Legendary: Game of Heroes OST

=== Music videos ===
Year	Title	Director
2014	"Deja Vu"	Hong Won-ki
2015	"Just Go"	Unknown
2015	"Cushion"	Hong Won-ki
2016	"I Like U Too Much"	Hong Won-ki
2016	"First Kiss"	Kwon Jin-mo
2017	"I Think I Love You"	Hong Won-ki
2017	"Friday Night"	Kwon Jin-mo
2017	"I (Knew It)"	Vikings League
2019	"We are LEGENDARY"	Jihyoung Shim

== Filmography ==
=== Reality shows ===
Year	Title	Network
2015	SONAMOO's Pet House	SBS MTV
2015	2015 SONAMOO	Naver TVcast
2015	Battle SONAMOO	V Live

=== Web dramas ===
Year	Title	Network
2016	The Miracle	Viki Rakuten Global TV

== Awards and nominations ==
=== Melon Music Awards ===
Year	Nominee / work	Award	Result
2015	Sonamoo	Best New Female Artist	Nominated

=== Soribada Best K-Music Awards ===
Year	Nominee / work	Award	Result
2017	Sonamoo	New Korean Wave Music Star Award	Won
