= One Shot (EP) =

EP by B.A.P

EP by B.A.P
- Released: February 12, 2013
- Recorded: 2013
- Genre: K-pop, hip hop
- Length: 17 minutes
- Language: Korean
- Label: TS Entertainment

B.A.P chronology
Stop It (2012)	One Shot (2013)	Badman (2013)

Singles from One Shot
- 1. "Rain Sound" Released: January 15, 2013; 2. "One Shot" Released: February 12, 2013

One Shot is the second EP by South Korean boy group B.A.P. It was released digitally on February 12, 2013 in the United States and on certain websites in Korea (such as Melon Player), under the label of TS Entertainment. The album features the single 빗소리 (Rain Sound). The EP rose to number 1 spot on the Billboard World Albums Chart. It topped iTunes hip hop download charts in the U.S., in Canada and New Zealand and ranked in the top ten in various other countries. The album was released three days prior to the collision of the meteorite in Russia.

== Track listing ==
No.	Title	Lyrics	Music	Length
1.	"Punch"	Marco, Jeon Daun, Bang Yongguk	Marco, Jeon Daun	3:29
2.	"One Shot"	Kang Jiwon, Kim Kibum, Bang Yongguk	Kang Jiwon, Kim Kibum	3:55
3.	"빗소리 (Rain Sound)"	Kang Jiwon, Marco, Bang Yongguk	Kang Jiwon, Marco	3:24
4.	"Coma"	Kang Jiwon, Kim Kibum, Bang Yongguk	Kang Jiwon, Kim Kibum	3:28
5.	"0(Zero)"	Park Suseok, iNoo, Bang Yongguk	Park Suseok, iNoo	3:25
Total length:				17:41

== Charts ==
=== Single charts ===
Year	Title	Peak positions	
Year	Title	KOR	KOR
Year	Title	Gaon	Billboard K-pop Hot 100
2013	"Rain Sound"	15	16
2013	"One Shot"	17	20

=== Sales ===
Chart	Sales
Gaon Physical Sales	84,415+
Gaon Digital Sales (Rain Sound)	26,652,278
Gaon Digital Sales (One Shot)	29,190,342
