= Sleepy (rapper) =

South Korean rapper (born 1984)

- 김성원
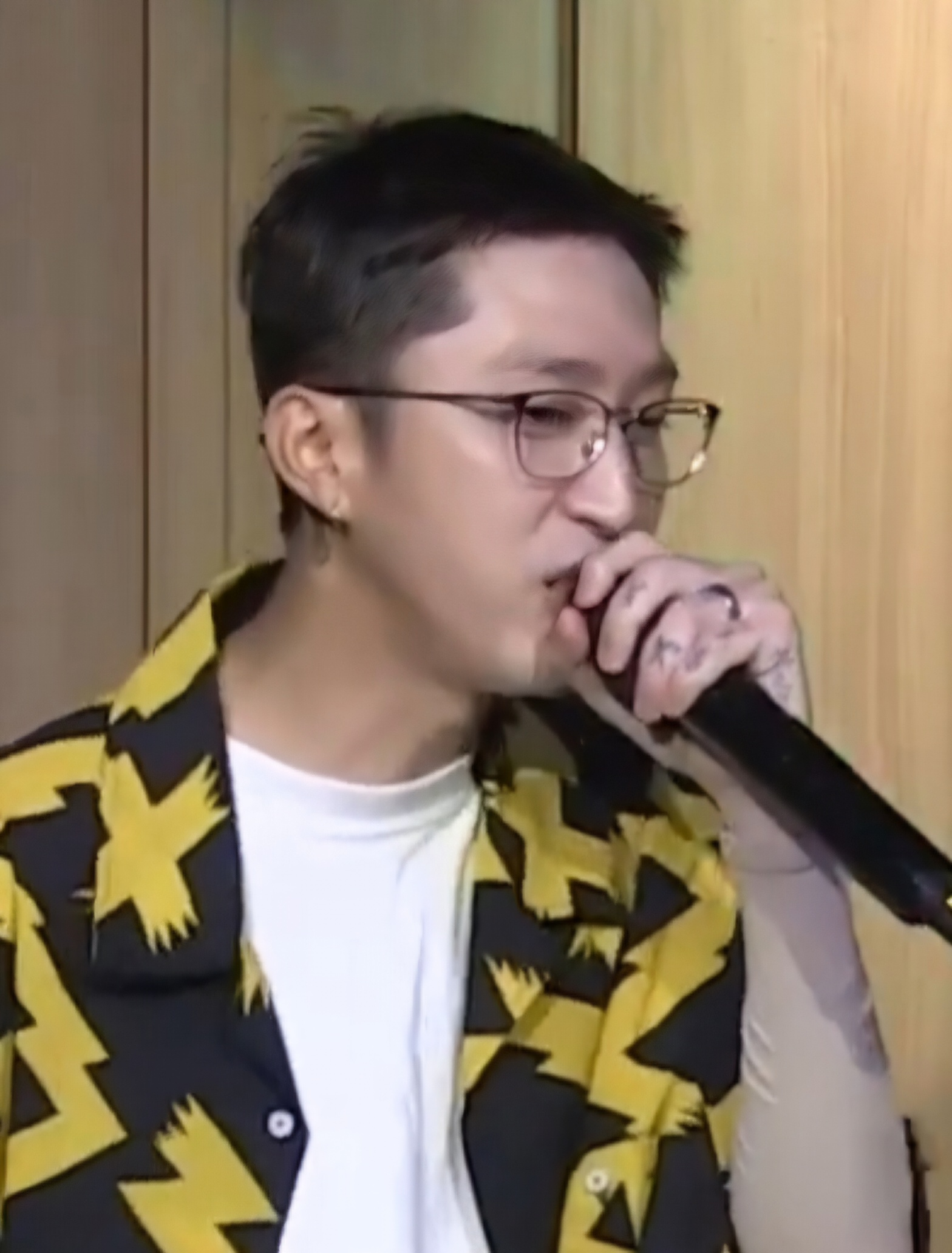
- Born: Kim Sung-won; February 21, 1984 (age 42); Incheon, South Korea
- Occupations: Rapper; Singer; Songwriter; Record producer
- Spouse: Kim Na-hyun (m. 2022)
- Children: 2
- Musical career
- Genres: Hip hop
- Instrument: Vocals
- Years active: 2008–present
- Labels: TS Entertainment, PVO Entertainment
- Formerly of: Untouchable

Korean name
- Hangul: 김성원
- RR: Gim Seongwon
- MR: Kim Sŏngwŏn

Kim Sung-won (Korean: 김성원; born February 21, 1984), better known by his stage name Sleepy (슬리피), is a South Korean rapper and a television personality. He is a member of the hip hop boy duo Untouchable. He released his solo debut single, "Cool Night", on June 16, 2015. He became a household name after appearing on reality TV shows like Real Man, I Live Alone, Law of the Jungle, and We Got Married.

== TS Entertainment lawsuit ==
On September 14, 2019, it was revealed that Sleepy had filed a lawsuit to terminate his contract with TS Entertainment, citing lack of trust after they refused to show him payment documents and a physical copy of his contract. Sleepy also said that he did not receive any payment for his activities until 10 years after his contract was signed. TS later denied these statements, saying all of Sleepy's claims were "false" and that he embezzled funds from the company, which Sleepy denied. The next day, it was announced TS Entertainment was forwarded to prosecution for overdue payments of artists.

== Personal life ==
Sleepy planned to marry his girlfriend Kim Na-hyun on October 10, 2021, however he postponed the wedding due to the COVID-19 pandemic. Later in March 2022, Sleepy announced that he would marry his non-celebrity girlfriend on April 9, 2022.

On November 6, Sleepy shared on his Instagram the happy news of his wife's pregnancy and that he was going to be a father soon. Their first child, a daughter, was born on March 29, 2024. On December 2nd, 2024 Kim Na-hyun appeared for an interview for the first time on television with Sleepy. During the interview Sleepy said his wife is 8 years younger than he is and Na-hyun also revealed that she was currently 4 months pregnant with their second child. Their second child, a boy, was born on April 23, 2025.

== Discography ==
=== Singles ===
Title	Year	Peak chart positions	Sales	Album
Title	Year	KOR	Sales	Album
As lead artist
"I Feel Blame" (기분탓) feat. Baek A-yeon	2015	39	KOR: 68,580	Non-album singles
"Body Lotion" (바디로션) feat. Bang Yong-guk	2016	—	KOR: 20,847	Non-album singles
"So What" (내가 뭘 잘못했는데) feat. Lee Guk-joo	2016	—	KOR: 16,984	Non-album singles
"Oh Yeah"	2016	—	—N/a	Non-album singles
"Beautiful Life"	2017	—	—N/a	Non-album singles
"Whatever" (맘대로) feat. Bloo, Liquor K.JR	2017	—	—N/a	Non-album singles
"Placebo" (플라시보) with Hash Swan, G2	2017	—	—N/a	Non-album singles
"Because of the Money" (돈 때문이야) as Sung Won-ee; prod. Young Tak	2020	—	—N/a	Non-album singles
"Santa Brothers!" (산타형!) as Sung Won-ee; prod. and ft. DinDin	2020	—	—N/a	Non-album singles
Collaborations
"Cool Night" (쿨밤) with Song Ji-eun	2015	18	KOR: 213,195	Non-album singles
"S.M.T.M (Show Me The Money)" with Hash Swan, Olltii, Black Nine, Punchnello, Penomeco, Ignito, Dok2	2017	82	KOR: 45,420	Non-album singles
"—" denotes releases that did not chart.

== Filmography ==
=== Television shows ===
Year	Title	Notes
2015	Cultwo Show	
2015	Mash Up!	Host
2015	Real Man	Episode 96-
2016	Cultwo Show	
2016	We Got Married	with Lee Guk-joo
2016	King of Mask Singer	Contestant as "Kung Fu Panda" (Episode 57)
2016	The God of Music 2	Cast member
2017	All Broadcasting in the World	Member
2017	Cultwo Show	
2017	Show Me the Money 6	Contestant
2020	King of Mask Singer	Contestant as "You're Great!" (Episodes 275–276)
2022	One Tree Table	Cast Member
2022	Extreme Beginner	Cast Member
2022	Show Me the Money 11	Contestant
2022–2023	Mr. Trot 2	Contestant

=== Web shows ===
Year	Title	Role	Notes	Ref.
2021	NegoKing 3	Host	with DinDin	
2022	Catch the Thief	Cast Member		

=== Music video appearances ===
Year	Song Title	Artist	Ref.
2022	"Wanna Go Get Some Abalone" (전복 먹으러 갈래)	Young Tak	

== Awards and nominations ==
Year	Award	Category	Nominated work	Result
2015	MBC Entertainment Awards	Best Male Newcomer	Real Man	Won
2016	MBC Entertainment Awards	Male Excellence Award in Variety Show	We Got Married	Nominated
