= First Sensibility =

- Album cover

Studio album by B.A.P
- Released: February 4, 2014
- Recorded: 2013–2014
- Genres: Hip-hop; K-pop; dance-pop; R&B; electronic
- Length: 42:02
- Labels: TS Entertainment; LOEN Entertainment

B.A.P chronology
| Badman (2013) | First Sensibility (2014) | B.A.P Unplugged 2014 (2014) |

Singles from First Sensibility (Album)
- 1. "1004 (Angel)"

First Sensibility is the first studio album by the South Korean male pop group B.A.P. It was released on February 3, 2014, under the label of TS Entertainment. It features the single "1004 (Angel)".

== Promotion ==
The first 30-second teaser clip for the music video of the title track "1004 (Angel)" was released on January 22, 2014. On January 26, B.A.P released their album medley and pre-released additional 30 seconds preview on Naver Music. The full video was released on February 2, 2014, through YouTube.

On February 7, B.A.P made their first live broadcast appearance promoting the album on Music Bank. This was followed by an appearance for "Bang X2" and "1004 (Angel)" on Music Core on February 8.

== Track listing ==
| No. | Title | Lyrics | Music | Length |
|---|---|---|---|---|
| 1. | "B.A.P (Intro)" | Lim Sanghyuk, Sleepy, Son Youngjin, Bang Yongguk | Lim Sanghyuk, Sleepy, Son Youngjin | 01:28 |
| 2. | "1004 (Angel)" | Kang Jiwon, Kim Kibum, Bang Yongguk | Kang Jiwon, Kim Kibum | 03:25 |
| 3. | "쉽죠 (Translation: Easy)" | Lim Sanghyuk, Sleepy, Son Youngjin, Kim Taeho, Bang Yongguk | Lim Sanghyuk, Sleepy, Son Youngjin, Kim Taeho | 03:36 |
| 4. | "Spy" | Park Suseok, iNoo, Bang Yongguk | Park Suseok, iNoo | 03:08 |
| 5. | "Check On" | Jeon Daun, D.Action, Bang Yongguk | Jeon Daun, D.Action | 03:06 |
| 6. | "Shady Lady" | Park Suseok, iNoo, Bang Yongguk | Park Suseok | 03:46 |
| 7. | "Lovesick" | Kang Jiwon, Kim Kibum, Bang Yongguk | Kang Jiwon, Kim Kibum | 03:28 |
| 8. | "Bang X2" | Jeon Daun, Bang Yongguk | Jeon Daun | 03:26 |
| 9. | "S.N.S" | Marco, Bang Yongguk | Marco | 03:29 |
| 10. | "Body & Soul" | Marco, Bang Yongguk | Marco | 03:47 |
| 11. | "Save Me" | Park Suseok, iNoo, Bang Yongguk | Park Suseok | 03:39 |
| 12. | "B.A.B.Y" | Marco, Bang Yongguk | Marco | 03:37 |
| 13. | "With You" | Kang Jiwon, Kim Kibum, Bang Yongguk | Kang Jiwon, Kim Kibum | 04:07 |
