= Moon Jong-up =

South Korean singer and actor

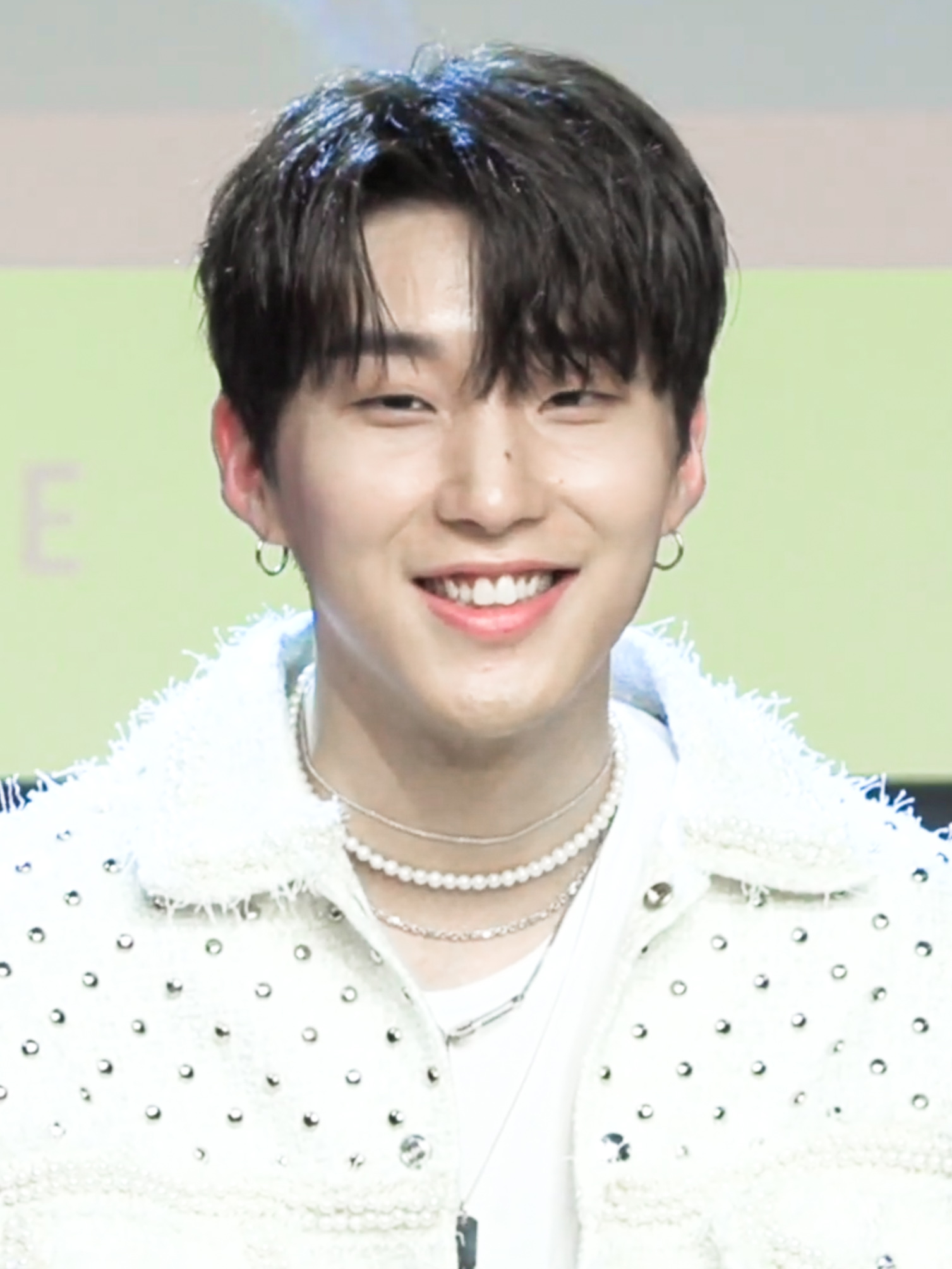
- Moon during his Headache album showcase, May 2020
- Born: February 6, 1995 (age 31); Siheung, Gyeonggi Province, South Korea
- Occupations: Singer; dancer; actor
- Musical career
- Genre: K-pop
- Instrument: Vocals
- Years active: 2012–present
- Labels: TS; The Groove; Big Ocean ENM; MA
- Member of: B.A.P

Korean name
- Hangul: 문종업
- Hanja: 文鐘業
- RR: Mun Jongeop
- MR: Mun Chongŏp

Moon Jong-up (Korean: 문종업; born February 6, 1995), also known mononymously as Jongup, is a South Korean singer, dancer, and actor. He debuted as an idol in the six-member group B.A.P under TS Entertainment, where he served as a sub-vocalist from 2012 to its dissolution in 2019. Following his departure from TS Entertainment, he released his debut single album Headache in May 2020.

== Early life ==
Moon was born on February 6, 1995, in Siheung, Gyeonggi Province. He is the youngest of three sons. He initially enrolled into an elementary school in the city before transferring to Sunae Elementary School in Bundang-gu, Seongnam, a month later. His mother, a certified chef, opened up a business at the time. Moon also attended Sunae Middle School, where he joined the dance club and performed at various school festivals and b-boy tournaments by the end of his first year. He was admitted into Hanlim Multi Art School in the Songpa District of Seoul and graduated on February 7, 2013.

== Career ==
=== Pre–debut ===
Moon met a talent agent during a competition, who would later call him for an audition. He danced to an Usher song and received his notice of acceptance on his way home. He became a trainee under TS Entertainment in August during his first year in high school. He spent the longest time as a trainee after bandmate Yongguk.

=== 2012–2019: B.A.P ===
Moon was revealed as a member of idol sextet B.A.P on January 17, 2012, where he served as a sub-vocalist and main dancer.

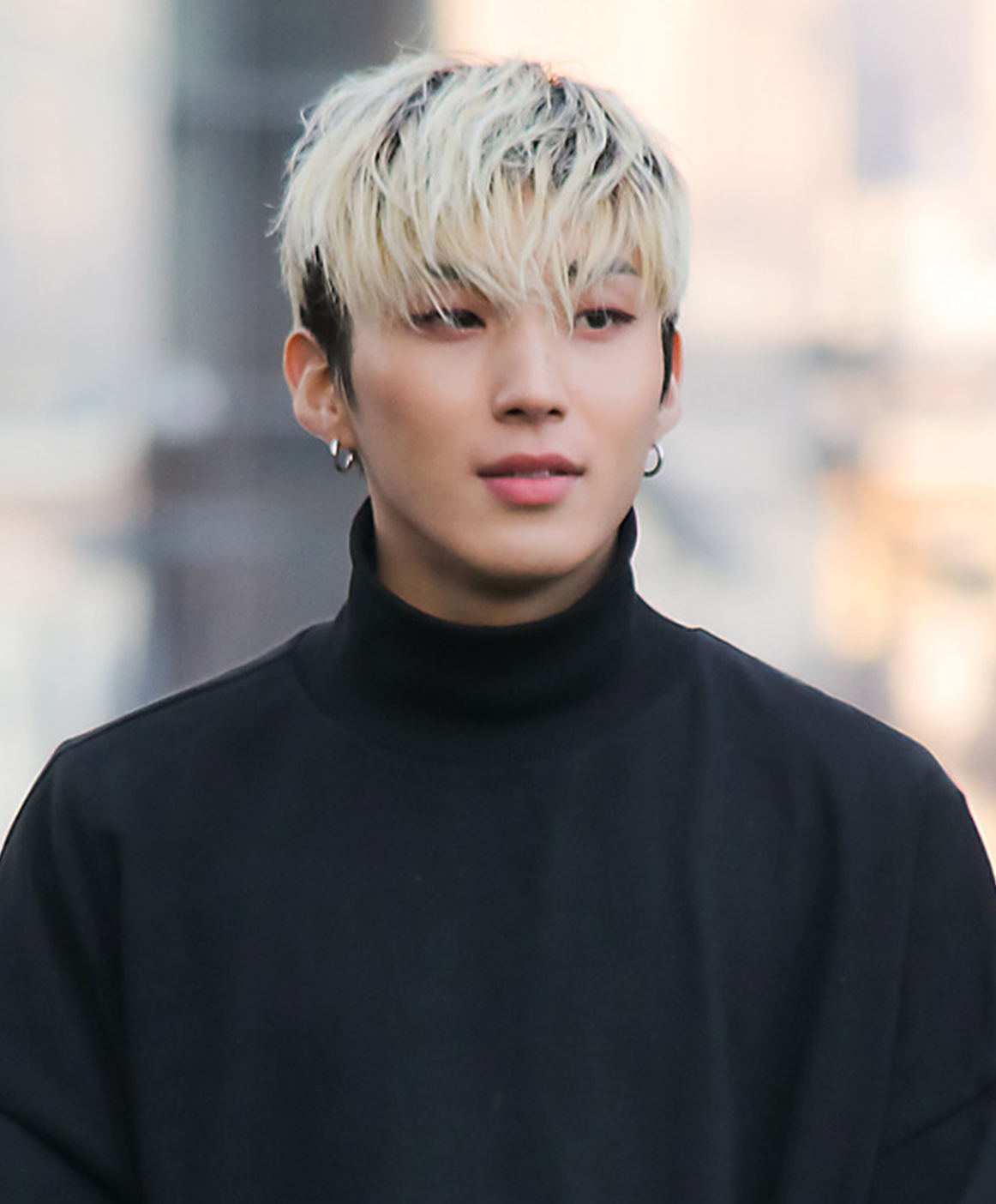
Moon at a fan meeting, March 2017

The group debuted nine days later with their single album Warrior. In November 2014, B.A.P filed a lawsuit against its agency. The members sought to nullify its contract with the company citing "unfair conditions and profit distribution".

In August of the following year, the two parties ultimately settled and B.A.P resumed its activities under TS Entertainment.

Moon performed his first solo song entitled "Try My Luck" during B.A.P's 2017 World Tour 'Party Baby!' in March. A PBR&B track, it was released as part of a project album with fellow member Daehyun on June 8.

In August and December 2018, Yongguk and Zelo left the group and record label following the expiration of their contracts, respectively.

Moon and the remaining three members left the agency in February 2019, leading the dissolution of B.A.P. Following B.A.P's disbandment, Moon took a six-month break from music.

=== 2019–present: New agency, and solo debut ===
Moon was cast for an encore show of the theater production The Lost Village; the performance took place on April 27, 2019. Set in Jeju Island amid the historical events of 1979, he played the young version of bar owner Donghyuk.

Moon was a contestant on Maeil Broadcasting Network's survival reality show Signhere (2019), where participants auditioned to join Jay Park's record label AOMG. He passed the first round, but was eliminated in the second after his collaborative performance with MBA. In November, Moon signed an exclusive contract with The Groove Company.

On May 7, 2020, he released his debut single album Headache and its funk-pop title track.

On July 8, 2021, he released his first extended play Us.

On May 31, Moon announced that RE:MEET fan meetings will be held in Japan on July 30 and 31, 2022.

On February 15, 2023, he was revealed as a contestant on JTBC's Peak Time and took part in TEAM 24:00. The group placed 3rd in the final round.

In 2023, Moon Jongup to Hold Meet & Greet at The Shops at Skyview’s K-Pop Day in New York.

On October 5, a teaser was released for Moon's second mini album, Some. The album was later released on October 30.

On October 31, 2024, he released his third mini album, Peter. On May 19, 2025, Jongup announced that he would be enlisting on the same day.

== Musical style ==
Moon cites American musician Chris Brown as his role model, who influenced him to become a singer.

== Discography ==
=== Extended plays ===
Title	Details	Peak chart positions	Sales
Title	Details	KOR	Sales
Us	Released: July 8, 2021; Label: Big Ocean ENM, Sony Music Korea; Formats: CD, digital download, streaming; Track listing: 1. "Photo" (feat. Bang Yongguk); 2. "Find" (feat. Moon Sujin); 3. "Us"; 4. "Goup" (feat. EK); 5. "Headache" (feat. Yunhway)	47	—N/a
Some	Released: October 30, 2023; Label: MA Entertainment, Warner Music Korea; Formats: CD, digital download, streaming; Track listing: 1. "Stuck"; 2. "X.O.X"; 3. "Common"; 4. "Common (English ver.)" 5. "Fine"	11	KOR: 43,626
Peter	Released: October 31, 2024; Label: MA Entertainment, Warner Music Korea; Formats: CD, digital download, streaming; Track listing: 1. "Boom"; 2. "Feel Me"; 3. "Love Bomber"; 4. "Twist Ya"; 5. "Muazigyoung"; 6. "Different Night" (feat. Godok, Ken); 7. "Peter Fan"	18	KOR: 22,744

=== Single albums ===
Title	Details	Peak chart positions	Sales
Title	Details	KOR	Sales
Headache	Released: May 7, 2020; Label: The Groove, Kakao M; Formats: CD, digital download, streaming; Track listing: 1. "Headache" (feat. Yunhway); 2. "Headache (Inst.)	23	KOR: 2,075

==== As lead artist ====
Title	Year	Peak chart positions	Album
Title	Year	KOR Down.	Album
"Try My Luck"	2017	—	Dae Hyun X Jong Up Project Album 'Party Baby'
"Headache" (feat. Yunhway)	2020	—	Headache
"Find" (feat. Moon Sujin)	2021	—	Us
"Us"	2021	—	Us
"X.O.X"	2023	68	Some
"Love Bomber"	2024	—	Peter
"Twist Ya"	2024	97	Peter

=== Guest appearances ===
List of non-single guest appearances, with other performing artists, showing year released and album name
Title	Year	Other performer(s)	Release	Ref.
"Gal Rae?" (갈래?; Gallae?)	2019	Bola, Meloh	Bola Tape 2	

=== Soundtrack appearances ===
Title	Year	Release	Ref.
"Venus" (비너스; Bineoseu) (Moon Jong-up featuring Kwon Hyun-bin)	2019	Mr. Queen OST	
"Day Dream" (Moon Jong-up and Nahyun featuring Sleepy)	2021	Idol Recipe OST	
"Spectrum" (Moon Jong-up featuring Kenta, Sohee, Woohee, Ryu Hoyeon, and Na Hyun)	2022	Idol Recipe OST	

== Filmography ==
Theater
Year	Title	Role	Ref.
2019	The Lost Village	Donghyuk	

Reality shows
Year	Title	Role	Notes	Ref.
2019	Signhere	Himself	Episode 3	
2023	Peak Time	Himself	Contestant as part of Team 24:00, 3rd Place	

Film
Year	Title	Role	Ref.
2022	Idol Recipe	Jang Jun	

== Accolades ==
=== Awards and nominations ===
Name of the award ceremony, year presented, category, nominee of the award, and the result of the nomination
Award ceremony	Year	Category	Nominee / Work	Result	Ref.
Asia Artist Awards	2024	Popularity Award – Male Singer	Moon Jong-up	Nominated	

=== Honors ===
Name of organization, year given, and the name of the honor
Organization	Year	Honor	Ref.
Korea Hallyu Culture Awards	2023	Popular Song Category – Excellence Award	

== Concerts and fanmeeting ==
- Jong Up Concert In Tokyo (2022)
- Moon Jong-up Fan Concert [UPPIE IS BACK] (2023)
- 2023 Moon Jong-up Concert ［SOMEthing comes Up] in Seoul (2023)
- 2024 Moon Jong Up Asia Tour (2024)
- Peter 2024, Concert in Seoul, Taipei (2024)
- Moon Jong-up Fanmeeting 'Hold Up' (2026)
