= B.A.P (South Korean band) =

South Korean boy band

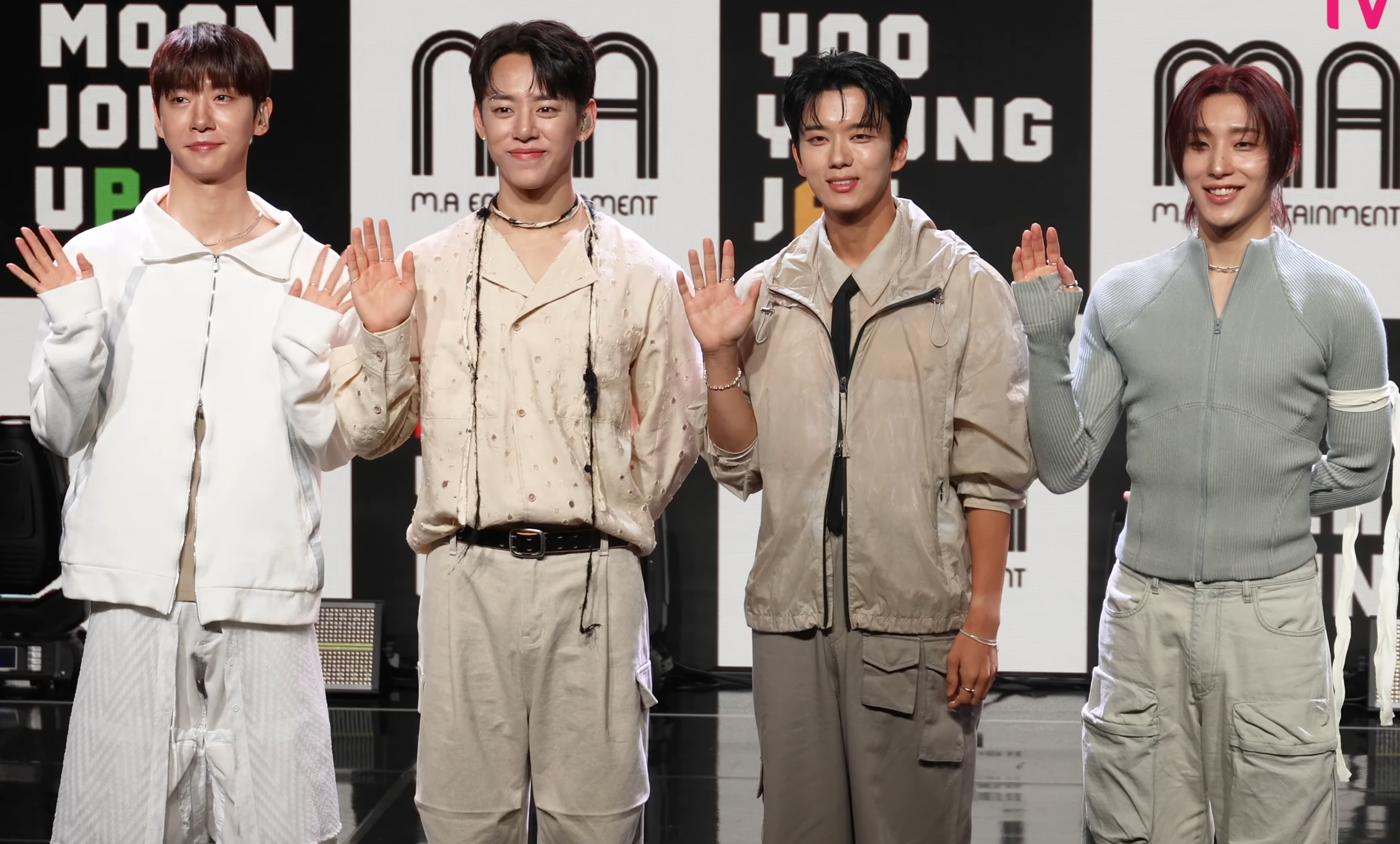
- B.A.P in 2024

Background information
- Also known as: Bang & Jung & Yoo & Moon
- Origin: Seoul, South Korea
- Genres: K-pop; hip hop; R&B; rock
- Years active: 2012–2019; 2024
- Labels: TS; King; MA
- Spinoffs: Bang & Zelo
- Past members: Yongguk; Himchan; Daehyun; Youngjae; Jong-up; Zelo

B.A.P (Korean: 비에이피; an acronym for Best Absolute Perfect), was a South Korean boy band that was created by TS Entertainment. The group, originally consisting of Yongguk, Himchan, Daehyun, Youngjae, Jong-up, and Zelo, debuted with the song "Warrior" in 2012.

B.A.P quietly disbanded on February 18, 2019, following the group's contract expiration with TS Entertainment. In 2024, the group officially reunited under the name Bang & Jung & Yoo & Moon (Korean: 방용국&정대현&유영재&문종업) to release their next album, Curtain Call in August. Members Zelo and Himchan did not take part in the comeback as a result of Zelo's military service and Himchan's sexual assault convictions.

== History ==
=== 2011: Pre-debut ===
Group leader Yongguk was the first member to be introduced in 2011, featuring on labelmate Song Ji-eun's song "Going Crazy". He also made a solo debut on August 12 with the single "I Remember", featuring Beast's Yang Yo-seob. Himchan was the second member to be introduced to the public, as an MC for MTV Korea television program The Show. On November 23, Zelo was introduced as the third member of the group through a collaboration with Yongguk as the group Bang&Zelo. The duo released the single "Never Give Up".

=== 2012: Warrior, Power, No Mercy, Crash and Stop It ===
In January 2012, the group starred in the reality program Ta-Dah, It's B.A.P, which aired on SBS MTV. The show focused on how the six members play the role of aliens from a different planet who worked together to debut as B.A.P and invade Earth to help save their dying planet, Planet Mato. On January 25, the group's debut single "Warrior" was released, with MTV Korea describing it as "powerful and charismatic". Nancy Lee of Enews World noted that the group had set out to differentiate themselves from the "pretty-boy" male idol archetype prevalent in the K-pop music industry with their "tough, bad boy image". On February 3, 2012, the corresponding EP Warrior entered Billboard's World Albums Chart at #10. In South Korea, Warrior sold over 10,000 copies within just two days of release.

In March, the group released a follow-up single, "Secret Love", and in April they made a comeback with the single "Power" and EP of the same name. Upon its release, Power sold out its initial batch of 30,000 copies and entered at #10 on the Billboard World Albums Charts.

B.A.P's third EP, No Mercy, was released digitally on July 19 and physically on July 24. On August 30 the repackaged version of the EP, renamed Crash, was released.

On October 23, B.A.P released their fourth single and EP, titled "Stop It".

=== 2013: One Shot and Japanese debut ===
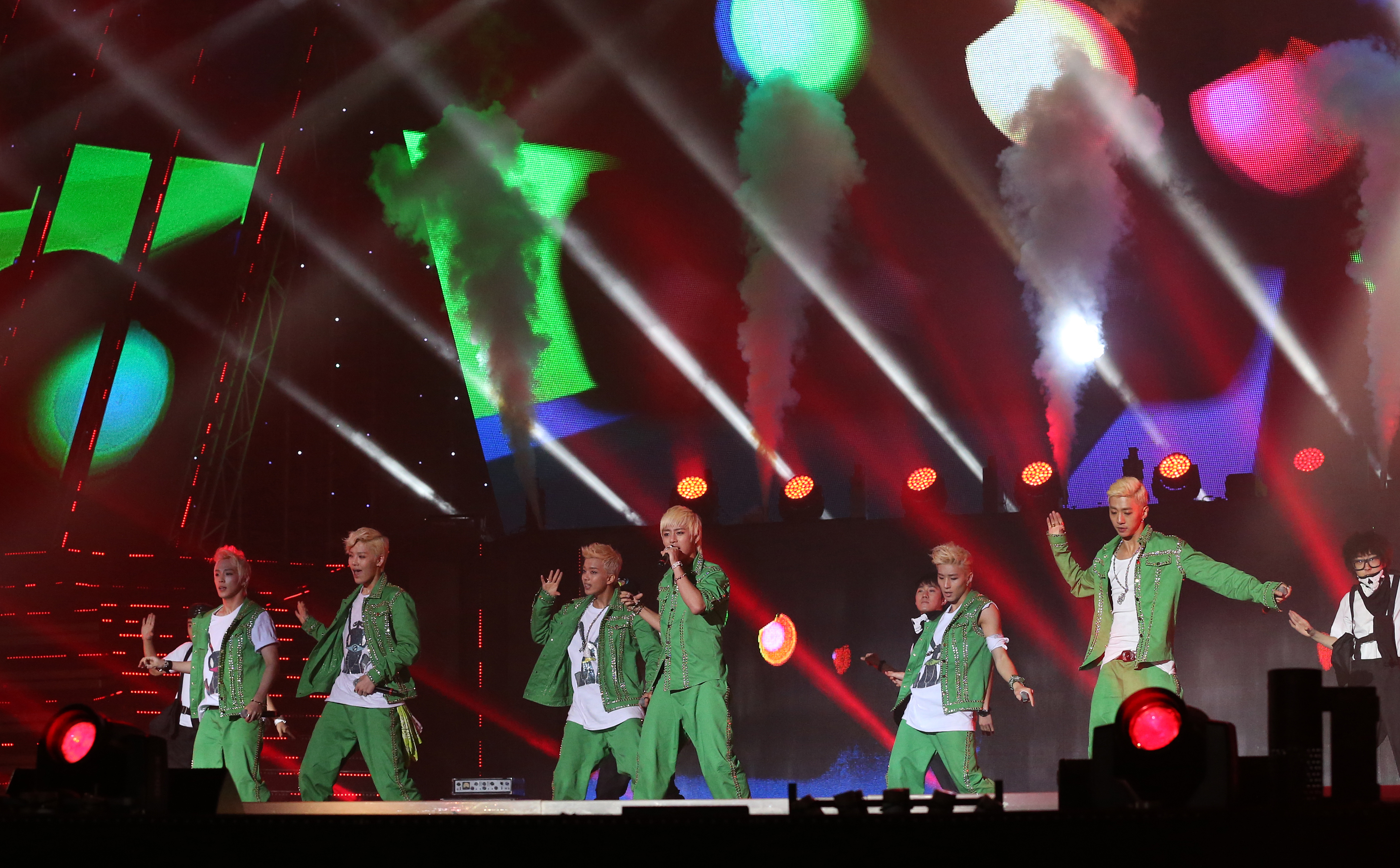
B.A.P performing at the 2013 K-POP World Festival

In February 2013, the group began releasing material from their fifth EP, One Shot. On February 21, the EP ranked No.1 on Billboard's World Albums chart.

In May, King Records, the Japanese record label that once signed Rain, signed B.A.P. They released their first Japanese music video for "Warrior" on YouTube on September 13, and their album and single were officially released on October 9. and released "One Shot" Japanese version on November 13.

The group's sixth EP, Badman, was released on August 6 with the promotional singles "Coffee Shop", "Hurricane" and "Badman".

=== 2014: First Sensibility, world tour, B.A.P Unplugged 2014 and lawsuit ===
On February 3, 2014, B.A.P released their first full-length studio album First Sensibility, containing a total of thirteen tracks including the title track "1004 (Angel)". Upon its release, the album topped the Billboard World Albums Chart, proving the group's international popularity. In Korea, First Sensibility also topped the Hanteo and Gaon monthly charts for February. The group took their first music show win on Show Champion with "1004 (Angel)" and went on to take two more wins with the single.

On April 3, B.A.P released their third Japanese single, "No Mercy", and ranked at #2 on Oricon's daily and weekly singles charts.

Following promotions of "1004 (Angel)", the group commenced the B.A.P Live On Earth 2014 Continent Tour with a two-day concert in Seoul, with an estimated audience of 20,000 attendees. This was their second solo concert in Korea. The group went on to hold a total of 23 concerts in cities throughout the United States, Asia, Australia, and Europe during the tour. Through the tour, they released the EP B.A.P Unplugged 2014.

On August 11, they released their fourth Japanese single, "Excuse Me". On October 27, TS Entertainment announced that they had cancelled the South American portion of the concert tour, in order to give the group members time to rest.

On November 27, it was reported that the group had filed a lawsuit against their label to nullify their contract, claiming unfair working conditions and profit distribution, including statements claiming that of the US$9 million the group had earned over the three years, each member had been paid a total of US$18,000. However, the following day, TS Entertainment issued a press release refuting the claims made, stating that there were "neither such maltreatment to the artists nor unfair clauses in the contract". Their statements were challenged when B.A.P released another statement claiming lack of accountability and saying that they were considering filing for defamation of character.

=== 2015: Settlement with TS and Matrix ===
On August 1, 2015, B.A.P. returned to TS Entertainment after both parties reached a settlement. They made their comeback with their eighth EP, Matrix, and the title track "Young, Wild & Free". The free showcase "BAP 151115" was held on November 15 at Dongdaemun Design Plaza and the music video for "Young, Wild & Free" was released the following day. On November 27, 2015, exactly one year after the lawsuit, they received a music show win for the single on Music Bank.

=== 2016: Carnival, Put 'Em Up, Noir, and Fly High, Bang Yongguk's Hiatus ===
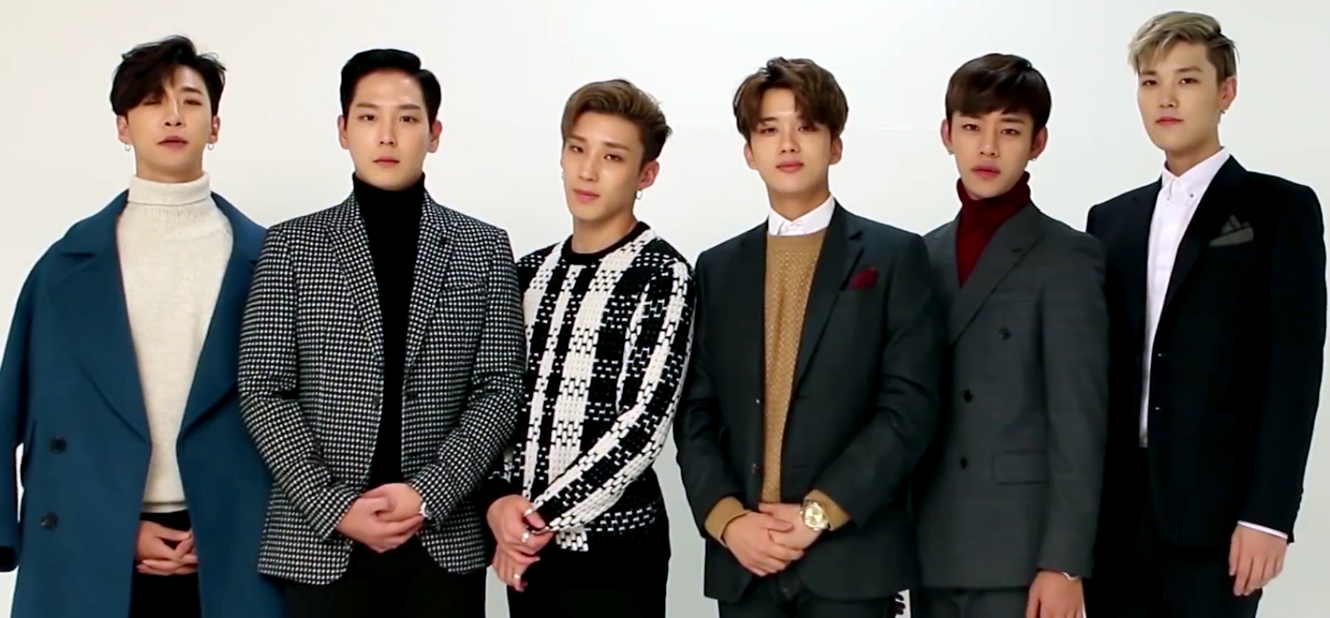
B.A.P in 2016

In February, they released their fifth extended play, Carnival, containing six songs. In March, they released their first Japanese studio album, Best. Absolute. Perfect. The album contained thirteen songs. Three of them ("New World", "Kingdom", and "Back in Time") were original Japanese songs. Between April–July, B.A.P performed on their Live On Earth 2016 tour, including dates in the U.S., Canada, Mexico, Italy, Finland, Germany, Poland, Australia, New Zealand, the U.K., and Russia.

On July 13, they came back with their fifth Japanese single "Feel So Good".

In August, they released the fifth single "Put 'Em Up". On October 25, 2016, TS Entertainment revealed that Yongguk will not be participating in the promotions for B.A.P's upcoming full-length album, Noir, due to anxiety disorders.

In November, B.A.P returned with their second studio album, Noir along with the music video for title song "Skydive". With Noir, B.A.P reclaimed their title as the K-Pop act with the most No.1 Albums on Billboard's World Album chart. Noir included standout track "Confession", a duet by rappers Bang Yongguk and Zelo set to a symphonic chorus that directly addressed their feelings during the lawsuit and subsequent hiatus.

On November 18, the music video for their 6th Japanese single, Fly High was published on YouTube, while a physical release on December 7 included the song "Fire Flame" and a Japanese version of "With You".

=== 2017–2019: Rose, Blue, Ego and departure from TS Entertainment ===
In March 2017, B.A.P released their sixth single album, Rose. Yongguk returned from his four-month hiatus to join the rest of the group for promotions. The lead track, "Wake Me Up", was recognized by Billboard's Jeff Benjamin as the group's "most personal and accomplished single yet". The EP focused on social issues, with the "Wake Me Up" music video addressing mental health issues, whilst the first track "Dystopia" directly attacked the idea of living in any so-called utopias, disregarding them all as illusions.

On April 26, 2017, they returned with their seventh Japanese single "Wake Me Up". On June 28, the group's second Japanese studio album, Unlimited, was released.

On September 5, 2017, B.A.P released their seventh single album, Blue, with "Honeymoon" serving as the title track.. On September 20, the group released their eighth Japanese single "Honeymoon".

On December 13, 2017, B.A.P released their eighth single album, Ego, with "Hands Up" serving as the title track.. On January 3, 2018, they released their ninth Japanese single "Hands Up".

On March 28, 2018, B.A.P released their third Japanese studio album, Massive.

On August 23, TS Entertainment released a statement revealing that Yongguk's contract with them had ended on August 19. Following his departure from the group, B.A.P will continue as a five-member group.

On November 2, it was revealed that B.A.P would be releasing a special album which consists of the solo tracks performed at their contracts called B.A.P Concert Special Solo 'The Recollection'. The album was then released on November 4.

On November 28, B.A.P. released their first Japanese best album titled B.A.P The Best -Japanese Version-.

On December 24, Zelo was confirmed to have left the group as his contract with their agency ended on December 2.

On February 18, 2019, the remaining four members also left TS Entertainment. However, member Jongup confirmed the possibility of reunion in the future.

=== 2024-2026: Documentary and support appearance ===
On June 12, 2024, B.A.P announced a documentary titled "Man on the Moon". In the teaser, which included Bang Yong-guk, Moon Jong-up, Jung Dae-hyun and Yoo Young-jae, announced plans to reunite and release new music. It is unclear if Zelo will be involved in the comeback due to him undertaking his mandatory military service. On July 2, MA Entertainment confirmed former B.A.P members Bang Yongguk, Jung Daehyun, Yoo Youngjae, and Moon Jongup would be returning as a team. The album, Curtain Call, was released on August 8, with the group promoting under the name "Bang & Jung & Yoo & Moon."

On November 28, MA Entertainment announced that the group would return with a winter album called Christmas With You.

On September 9, 2025, Daehyun stated in an interview that the members would go back to their own individual activities, and that a future reunion, while not impossible, would be difficult due to the members' separate contracts.

On June 24, 2026, five members Yongguk, Daehyun, Youngjae, Jongup, and Zelo made a surprise joint appearance in a studio to record the song "Name," a track from Daehyun's album Puzzl(ov)e.

On July 5, 2026, Yongguk spoke about plans for the group's comeback next year to celebrate their 15th anniversary.

== Artistry and influences ==
During the group's debut, all of the members dyed their hair blonde. The group's members have played a role in their image and musical direction, and commentators have noted a distinction between their "tough, bad-boy" image and other K-pop boy groups.

The group's leader Yongguk has previously made comments on the influence that African American musicians have had on him, citing 50 Cent, P. Diddy, Pharrell and other rappers as musical influences. He played a role in the production of all the tracks on B.A.P's debut EP Warrior. In addition, group member Himchan is a multi-instrumentalist influenced by Korean traditional music. He plays a number of traditional instruments including daegeum, janggu, kkwaenggwari and jing in addition to more traditional instruments including guitar, piano, and violin. All of the group's members are influenced by R&B musicians; Jongup has cited hip hop and dance music as influences and said that Chris Brown is one of his idols, while Zelo has said he looks up to will.i.am and Kanye West. Daehyun cites Shin Yong-jae among his musical influences while Youngjae cites neo soul musicians as well as Musiq Soulchild and Jay Park.

B.A.P has been named a "versatile group" by MTV Korea, with Yun Seong-yeol of Star News Korea lauding their charisma and on-stage performances, as well as Yongguk and Zelo's rapping and Daehyun and Youngjae's vocal abilities.

== Members ==
Former

- Yongguk (용국; 2012–2018, 2024)
- Himchan (힘찬; 2012–2019)
- Daehyun (대현; 2012–2019, 2024)
- Youngjae (영재; 2012–2019, 2024)
- Jongup (종업; 2012–2019, 2024)
- Zelo (젤로; 2012–2018)

== Discography ==
=== Korean ===
- First Sensibility (2014)
- Noir (2016)

=== Japanese ===
- Best. Absolute. Perfect (2016)
- Unlimited (2017)
- Massive (2018)

== Filmography ==
=== Television ===
Date	Show	Notes
2012	Ta-Dah! It's B.A.P	10 episodes
2012	B.A.P Diary	2 episodes
2012	B.A.P's Killing Camp	3 episodes
2014	B.A.P Attack!	13 episodes (B.A.P Live On Earth 2014 Continent Tour)
2016	B.A.P's One Fine Day	8 episodes (Began airing October 14, 2016)
2018	B.A.P 오지GO 지리GO (Untact Life)	4 episodes (Began airing May 9, 2018)
2024	'Man On The Moon' Documentary	5 episodes (Began airing June 21, 2024)

== Concerts and tours ==
- B.A.P Live on Earth 2013 (2013)
- B.A.P 1st Japan Tour Warrior Begins (2013)
- B.A.P Live on Earth 2014 Continent Tour (2014)
- B.A.P Live on Earth 2016 World Tour (2016)
- B.A.P 2nd Japan Tour Be.Act.Play (2017)
- B.A.P 2017 World Tour Party Baby! (2017)
- B.A.P 3rd Japan Tour Massive (2018)
- B.A.P 2018 Live Limited (2018)
- B.A.P Forever Tour (2018)
- 2024 The Last Fan-Con [Curtain Call] Asia Tour (2024)
- BANG&JUNG&YOO&MOON Encore Concert [Farewell, Earth] In Taipei / Asia (2025)

== Awards and nominations ==
B.A.P has won 29 awards out of 38 nominations, including three MTV Europe Music Awards, two Japan Gold Disc Awards, three Gaon Chart Music Awards, and eight So-Loved Awards.

The name of the award ceremony, year presented, category, nominee of the award, and the result of the nomination
Award ceremony	Year	Category	Nominee / work	Result	Ref.
Asia Artist Awards	2016	Best Entertainer Award (Male Group Category)	B.A.P	Won	
Creative Brand Awards	2013	Entertainment Award	B.A.P	Won	
Gaon Chart Music Awards	2012	Best Male Rookie	B.A.P	Won	
Gaon Chart Music Awards	2013	World Rookie	B.A.P	Won	
Gaon Chart Music Awards	2015	Hot Trend Award	B.A.P	Won	
Golden Disc Awards	2012	Popularity Award	B.A.P	Nominated	
Golden Disc Awards	2012	New Artist Award (Digital)	B.A.P	Won	
Golden Disc Awards	2012	Single Album Award	B.A.P	Nominated	
Golden Disc Awards	2013	Digital Bonsang	"Badman"	Nominated	
Golden Disc Awards	2013	Popularity Award	B.A.P	Nominated	
Golden Disk Awards Taiwan	2013	Selling more than 5,000 copies	One Shot	Won	
Japan Gold Disc Awards	2014	Best New Artist	B.A.P	Won	
Japan Gold Disc Awards	2014	Best 3 New Artists	B.A.P	Won	
J-pop Asia Music Awards	2012	New Artist/Band of 2012	B.A.P	Won	
J-pop Asia Music Awards	2012	Most Promising Artist/Band	B.A.P	Won	
Korean Cultural Entertainment Grant Prize	2017	K-Pop Star Award	B.A.P	Won	
Melon Music Awards	2012	Best New Male Artist	B.A.P	Won	
Mnet Asian Music Awards	2012	Mnet PD's Choice Award	B.A.P	Won	
Mnet Asian Music Awards	2012	Best New Male Artist	B.A.P	Nominated	
Mnet Asian Music Awards	2012	Artist of the Year	B.A.P	Nominated	
MTV Europe Music Awards	2013	Best Korean Act	B.A.P	Nominated	
MTV Europe Music Awards	2014	Best Korean Act	B.A.P	Won	
MTV Europe Music Awards	2014	Best Japan and Korea Act	B.A.P	Won	
MTV Europe Music Awards	2014	Best Worldwide Act	B.A.P	Nominated	
MTV Europe Music Awards	2016	Best Korean Act	B.A.P	Won	
Seoul Music Awards	2012	Best New Artist	B.A.P	Won	
Seoul Music Awards	2013	Bonsang Award	"One Shot"	Won	
Seoul Music Awards	2013	Popularity Award	B.A.P	Nominated	
So-Loved Awards (Note: The So-Loved Awards is a German K-pop popularity award sponsored by the Korea Foundation for International Cultural Exchange (KOFICE).)	2012	Best Male Rookie Artist	B.A.P	Won	
So-Loved Awards	2012	Best Choreography	"Warrior"	Won	
So-Loved Awards	2013	Best Male Group	B.A.P	Won	
So-Loved Awards	2013	Best Dance – Male Artist	"One Shot"	Won	
So-Loved Awards	2013	Best Music Video	"One Shot"	Won	
So-Loved Awards	2014	Best Male Group	B.A.P	Won	
So-Loved Awards	2014	Album of the Year	First Sensibility	Won	
So-Loved Awards	2014	Best Music Video	"1004"	Won	
Soribada Best K-Music Awards	2017	Bonsang Award	B.A.P	Won	
V Chart Awards	2013	Best New Artist	B.A.P	Won	
