= Untouchable (band) =

South Korean hip hop duo

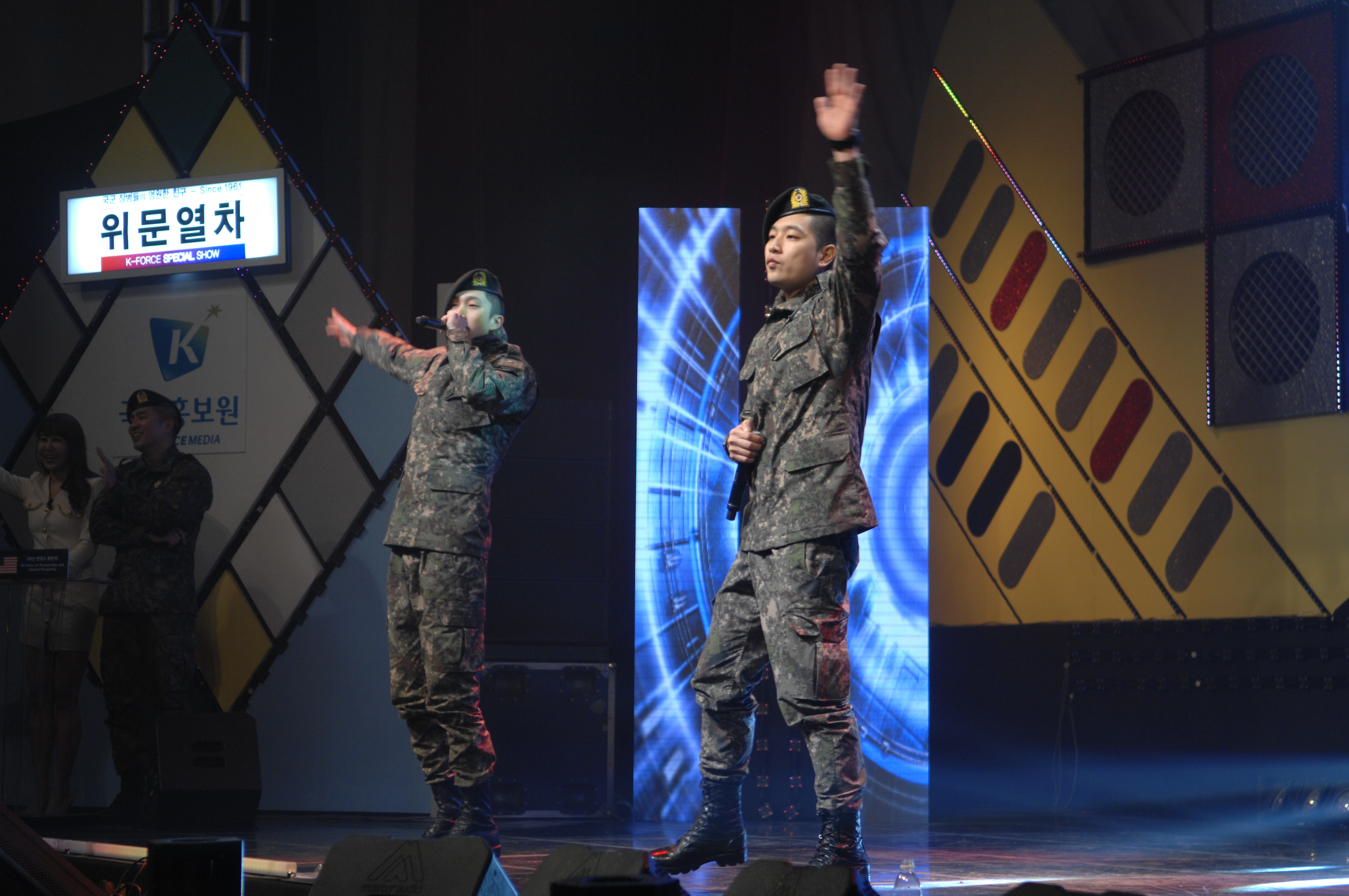
- Untouchable in 2013

Background information
- Origin: Seoul, South Korea
- Genre: Hip-hop
- Years active: 2006–2019
- Label: TS Entertainment
- Past members: Sleepy; D.Action

Untouchable (Korean: 언터쳐블) was a South Korean hip hop duo managed by TS Entertainment. The group released their first single, "Ready To Shot", on 24 July 2006, but made their official debut on October 10, 2008, with the hit single "It's Okay".

== History ==
=== 2008–2010: Debut & success ===
Untouchable made their official debut on November 10, 2008 with their single "It's Okay" ft. Hwayobi. They released their first full album entitled "Quiet Storm" on January 8, 2009. Their single "Tell Me Why" ft. Hwa Young became a hit and topped online music charts. They followed this with the song "Oh", which was featured in their mini album "Untouchable", released June 9, 2009.

On February 4, 2010 their 2nd mini album "Untouchable: 2nd Mini Album" was released, featuring the vocals of Brown Eyed Girls' Narsha in the song "Living in the Heart." On February 9, Untouchable's "Living in the Heart" topped online music charts.

Untouchable's second album was postponed in 2010 due to the Yeonpyeong Island tragedy. The album "Who's Hot" was released in December with the title track "Make a fuss".

=== 2011: "You you" release & military enlistment ===
Untouchable released their digital single "You you" on May 4, 2011.

Both members started their mandatory military service in August 2011.

=== 2013: "Trips" and release from military ===
They returned from military service on May 1, 2013 and took a break before making their music comeback at the end of the year. They released Vain featuring Koonta of Rude Paper in November and followed up with a second track Trip which was released on their agency YouTube page on the December 5.

=== 2014: "Take out" ===
The duo returned in July with Take out featuring Mayson the Soul.

=== 2015: "Cigarette & Liquor", "Mask On", "Crayon", collaborations & solo debut ===
On January 16, 2015, Untouchable released their 8th digital single album titled Cigarette & Liquor. On February 24, 2015 they made their comeback with a digital single called Mask On. On March 18, 2015 they released their 5th mini album titled HEIIVEN, the track Crayon served as the title track.

=== 2019: Disbandment ===
On September 14, 2019, it was announced that Sleepy left TS Entertainment via lawsuit, and the duo disbanded.

== Former Members ==
- Sleepy (슬리피)
- D.Action (디액션)

== Discography ==
=== Studio albums ===
Title	Album details	Peak chart positions	Sales
Title	Album details	KOR	Sales
Quiet Storm	Released: January 8, 2009; Label: TS Entertainment; Formats: CD, digital download	—	—N/a
Who's Hot	Released: December 2, 2010; Label: TS Entertainment, CJ E&M; Formats: CD, digital download	43	—N/a
"—" denotes releases that did not chart.

=== Extended plays ===
Title	Album details	Peak chart positions	Sales
Title	Album details	KOR	Sales
1st Mini Album	Released: June 9, 2009; Label: TS Entertainment; Formats: CD, digital download	—	—N/a
2nd Mini Album	Released: February 4, 2010; Label: TS Entertainment; Formats: CD, digital download	16	—N/a
3rd Mini Album	Released: December 30, 2010; Label: TS Entertainment, CJ E&M; Formats: CD, digital download	56	—N/a
Trip	Released: November 11, 2013; Label: TS Entertainment, CJ E&M; Formats: CD, digital download	49	—N/a
Heiiven	Released: March 18, 2015; Label: TS Entertainment, CJ E&M; Formats: CD, digital download	38	—N/a
"—" denotes releases that did not chart.

=== Charted singles ===
Title	Year	Peak chart positions	Sales (DL)	Album
Title	Year	KOR	Sales (DL)	Album
As lead artist
"Live in the Heart" (가슴에살아) feat. Narsha	2010	6	—N/a	2nd Mini Album
"Merry Go Round" (회전목마)	2010	16	—N/a	Non-album single
"Make a Fuss" (난리 브루스) feat. Vasco	2010	48	—N/a	Who's Hot
"Only You" (단 한사람) feat. Mellow	2010	34	—N/a	3rd Mini Album
"You You" feat. Oh Jin-seok	2011	45	KOR: 260,768	Non-album single
"Call Me" (연락 좀 자주 해) feat. Andrew Choi	2013	17	KOR: 154,269	Trip
"Vain" (배인) feat. Koonta	2013	27	KOR: 145,361	Trip
"Take Out" feat. Mayson The Soul	2014	38	KOR: 77,684	Non-album single
"I See The Path" (길이 보여) feat. Vasco, Giriboy	2014	—	KOR: 31,560	Heiiven
"Smoke" (거꾸로 문 담배) feat. Outlaw	2015	—	KOR: 13,080	Non-album single
"Crayon" (크레파스)	2015	55	KOR: 20,763	Heiiven
"—" denotes releases that did not chart.
