= Yoo Young-jae =

South Korean singer and actor

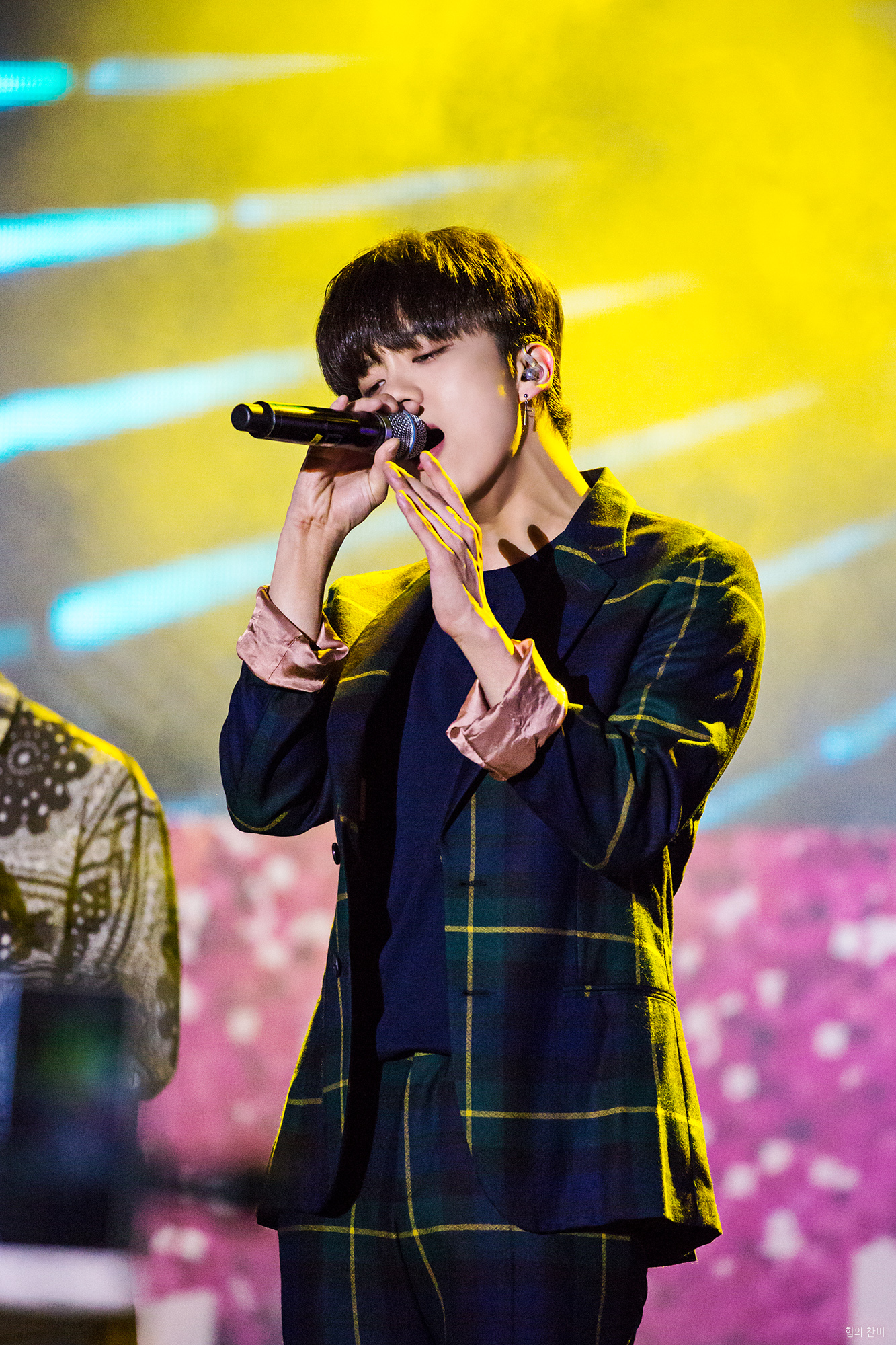
- Yoo performing at the LG Dream Festival, October 2017
- Born: January 24, 1994 (age 32); Seoul, South Korea
- Occupations: Actor; singer
- Agent: ELO Entertainment
- Musical career
- Instrument: Vocals
- Years active: 2012–present
- Labels: TS; J World; DMost
- Member of: B.A.P

Korean name
- Hangul: 유영재
- Hanja: 劉永才
- RR: Yu Yeongjae
- MR: Yu Yŏngjae

Yoo Young-jae (Korean: 유영재; born January 24, 1994), also known mononymously as Youngjae, is a South Korean singer and actor. He debuted as an idol in the six-member group B.A.P under TS Entertainment, where he served as the main vocalist from 2012 to its dissolution in 2019. He released his debut mini-album Fancy in April 2019.

== Early life ==
Yoo was born on January 24, 1994, in Bangbae-dong in the Seocho District of Seoul. He is the second and younger son of his father and fashion brand business-owning mother. He lived in a wealthy household up until the 1997 Asian financial crisis; his family struggled financially thereafter. They lived in a container home for a period of time and his father moved away. Yoo lived in a villa in Yongin with his mother and they moved into a basement room in Seoul. He spent his youth playing video games and, in sixth grade, wanted to become a pro-gamer. In his second year of middle school, Yoo sang during a talent show with a group of friends; he described the cheers for an encore "only for me". The following year, he enrolled in a music hagwon where he began receiving music lessons.

== Career ==
=== 2012–2019: Career beginnings and B.A.P ===
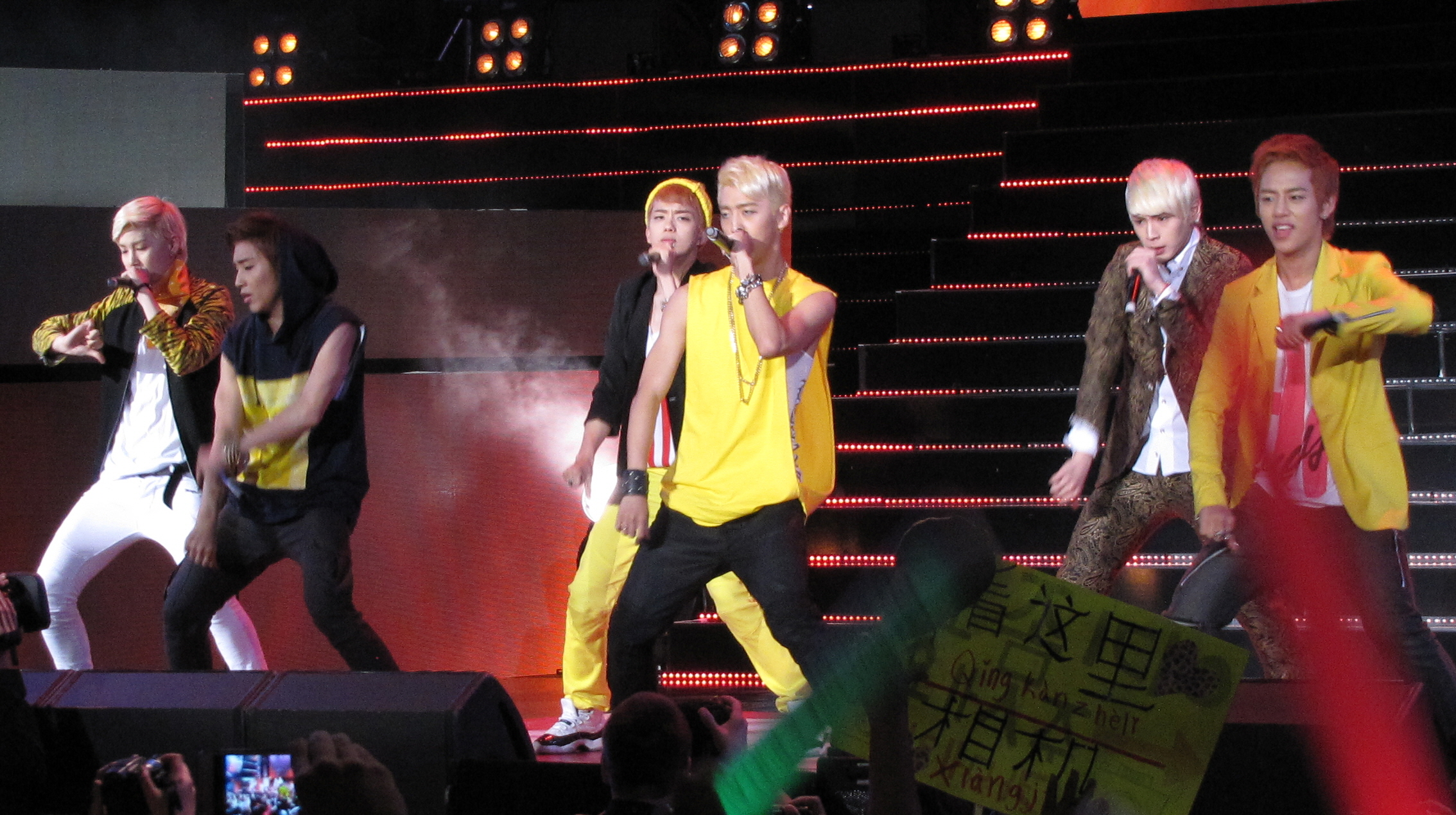
B.A.P at KCON 2012

Yoo auditioned at several music agencies as a high school student. After spending tens months in communication, he became a trainee under JYP Entertainment and was slated to debut in a group at the time. He ultimately left the record company one year later citing "personal reasons". He auditioned for TS Entertainment and was signed to the label soon after.

Yoo was revealed as a member of idol sextet B.A.P on January 18, 2012, where he served as the main vocalist. The group debuted eight days later with its single album Warrior. In November 2014, the group filed a lawsuit against its agency. The members sought to nullify its contract with the company citing "unfair conditions and profit distribution". In August of the following year, the two parties ultimately settled and B.A.P resumed its activities under TS Entertainment. In August and December 2018, Yongguk and Zelo left the group and record label following the expiration of their contracts, respectively. Yoo and the remaining three members left the agency in February 2019, leading to the dissolution of B.A.P.

=== 2019–present: Solo activities ===
Yoo established an independent record label to release his solo music. He released his debut mini-album Fancy on April 19. Yoo was cast as the lead role in JTBC's app drama series Kim Seul Gi Genius as the lead character. The app was released on iOS and Android and the first episode was made available to watch on May 18, 2019. It will be made available for streaming in November 2019. Yoo also joined the cast of TvN D's variety, 'Mileage Soccer' where celebrities played soccer with various soccer teams in Korea to raise money for charity.

On August 29, 2019, it was announced that Yoo had signed an exclusive contract with a new agency, DMost Entertainment. Under DMost Entertainment, Yoo would continue to pursue music as well as acting and variety. Yoo was cast in his first major television role in the KBS drama Woman of 9.9 Billion which began airing in November. Yoo also participated in his first OST for the drama. The song, "그녀가 처음 울던날" is a remake of Kim Kwang Seok's song of the same name.

Yoo made his comeback with his second mini-album O,on on October 22.

In March 2020, fans speculated that Yoo had terminated his contract with DMost Entertainment after his profile had been taken down from the company's official website. After fans contacted the company, it was confirmed that he had terminated his contract with them. Yoo was then represented again by his one-man agency, JWorld Entertainment.

In June 2020, it was revealed that Yoo had been cast in tvN's historical comedy drama, Mr. Queen through an official audition process. The drama was first aired on December 12, 2020.

In February 2021, it was announced that Yoo would be making his debut on the big screen with Sing a Song, where he would be playing the lead character Hyun-do, a teenager from an elite family who wants to pursue pop music rather than classical music.

On March 14, 2022, it was revealed that Yoo signed a contract with Forstar Company, who would support him in his acting career. His contract with Forstar Company ended in May 2024, and it was revealed in June 2024 that Yoo signed a contract with A.COMPASS, who would support him in his music and acting career.

Yoo has since continued developing his acting career, taking on the lead role of Na A-reum in tvN's Our Beautiful Summer upon completing his military service. Yoo also made his debut as a musical actor in 2024 through Buchihanan (부치하난) where he was cast in the lead role of Nu-ri.

Yoo released the single "Dive" on August 25, 2025.

On January 8, 2026, it was announced by the company, ELO Entertainment (upon merging with A.COMPASS), on Instagram that Yoo has joined their newly formed company alongside other talents. On June 21, he released a new single "A Perfect Day".

== Personal life ==
=== Military service ===
On November 6, 2022, Yoo posted on Instagram that he would be serving his mandatory military service on November 8, 2022. Yoo completed his military service on May 7, 2024.

== Discography ==
=== Extended plays ===
Title	Details	Peak chart positions	Sales
Title	Details	KOR	Sales
Fancy	Released: April 19, 2019; Label: J World/Warner Music; Format: CD, digital download; Track listing: 1. "Present (선물)"; 2. "Another Night"; 3. "Gravity"; 4. "Hope"	15	KOR: 4,959
O,on	Released: October 22, 2019; Label: DMost; Format: CD, digital download; Track listing: 1. "Forever Love"; 2. "Feel It With This"; 3. "Our Story (너와 나의 이야기) (feat. PLUMA)"; 4. "Forever Love (Inst.)"	20	KOR: 2,750

=== Singles ===
==== As lead artist ====
Title	Year	Release
"Stay with Me"	2018	B.A.P Concert Special Solo 'The Recollection'
"Another Night"	2019	Fancy
"Forever Love"	2019	O,on
"Dive"	2025	Non-album single
"A Perfect Day"	2026	Non-album single

==== Other releases ====
Title	Year	Peak chart positions		Sales	Release
Title	Year	KOR	KOR Hot	Sales	Release
Collaborations
"Everything Is Pretty" (다 예뻐; Da Yeppeo) (with Sunhwa)	2012	22	18	KOR: 307,155	Non-album single
Promotional single
"Fly Day" (Note: Theme song for Pyeongchang Olympics G-100.) (with various artists)	2017	—	—	—N/a	Non-album single
Soundtrack appearances
"The First Day She Cried" (그녀가 처음 울던 날)	2019	—	—	—N/a	Woman of 9.9 Billion OST
"Everlasting"	2022	—	—	—N/a	Sing A Song OST
"—" denotes releases that did not chart or were not released in that region.

== Filmography ==
=== Film ===
Year	Title	Role	Ref.
2022	Sing A Song	Hyun-Do	

=== Television series ===
Year	Title	Role	Notes	Ref.
2019	Kim Is a Genius	Cheon Cha-dol		
2019	Woman of 9.9 Billion	Kim Seok		
2020–2021	Mr. Queen	Kim Hwan		
2021	Police University	Jo Joon-wook		
2022	Cleaning Up	Yongmi's Nephew	Cameo (Ep 1 & 11)	
2024	Our Beautiful Summer	Na A-reum		

=== Web series ===
Year	Title	Role	Ref.
2022	Crush of Spring	Jin Geum-Seong	
2022	Mimicus	Han You-Sung	

=== Television shows ===
Year	Title	Role	Notes	Ref.
2016	Celebrity Bromance	Host	5 Episodes	
2017	King of Mask Singer	Contestant	Episode 129	
2017–2018	The Show	MC	October 17, 2017 – May 8, 2018	
2019	King of Mask Singer	Contestant	Episodes 203–204	
2019	Mileage Soccer	Cast	10 Episodes	
2019	Glocal Tour	Host	Episodes 12–13	

== Theater ==
Year	Title	Role	Notes	Ref.
2024	Buchihanan	Nu-ri		
