= Zelo =

South Korean rapper (born 1996)

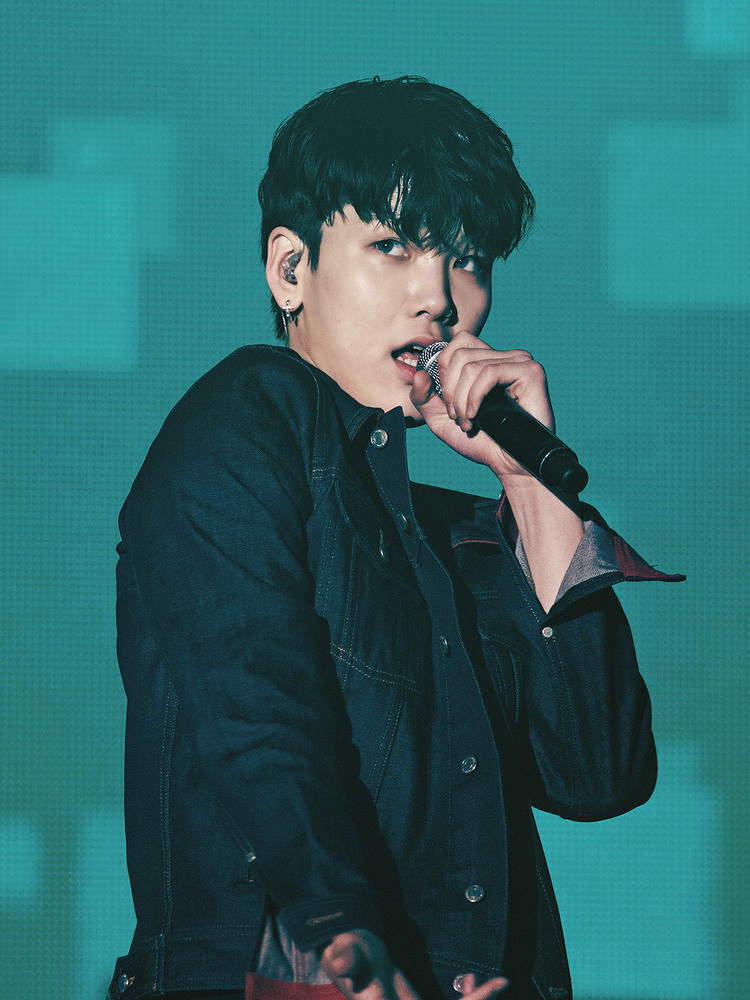
- Zelo at Daejeon Love Blue Concert, September 2017
- Born: Choi Jun-hong; October 15, 1996 (age 30); Mokpo, South Korea
- Occupations: Rapper; dancer
- Musical career
- Genres: K-pop; Hip hop; dance
- Instrument: Vocals
- Years active: 2011–present
- Labels: TS; A; Uzurocks; Vlacksquad
- Member of: B.A.P; Bang & Zelo

Korean name
- Hangul: 최준홍
- Hanja: 崔準烘
- RR: Choe Junhong
- MR: Ch'oe Chunhong

Choi Jun-hong (Korean: 최준홍; born October 15, 1996), known professionally as Zelo (젤로), is a South Korean rapper and dancer best known as the member of the South Korean boy group B.A.P. He made his recording debut with the single "Never Give Up" under B.A.P's sub-unit Bang&Zelo in November 2011. He departed TS Entertainment in December 2018.

== Early life ==
Zelo was born on October 15, 1996, in Mokpo, South Korea. He has one older brother. He aspired to be a soccer player when he was young, but then changed his dreams to becoming a singer as he chanced upon music and grew interested in it. He started practising beatboxing and dancing at home. In 5th grade, Zelo was introduced by an acquaintance who recognized his talent to Joy Dance - Plug In Music Academy located in Gwangju, which is a well-known music academy. He auditioned for several recording companies but did not succeed generally because he was too young. He was finally accepted as a trainee at TS Entertainment. He graduated from School of Performing Arts Seoul in 2015.

== Career ==
=== Career beginnings and B.A.P ===
Zelo first collaborated with Bang Yong-guk in the sub-unit Bang&Zelo. The pair released "Never Give Up" on December 2, 2011. Zelo was revealed as a member of idol sextet B.A.P on January 17, 2012, where he served as the rapper. The group debuted nine days later with its single album Warrior. In November 2014, the group filed a lawsuit against its agency. The members sought to nullify its contract with the company citing "unfair conditions and profit distribution". In August of the following year, the two parties ultimately settled and B.A.P resumed its activities under TS Entertainment. Following the expiration of his contract with TS Entertainment on December 2, 2018, Zelo decided not to renew with the company. He officially departed from the group on December 24, after finishing the European leg of B.A.P's 2018 tour. The remaining four members left the agency in February 2019, leading the dissolution of B.A.P.

=== Soloist career ===
Zelo signed an exclusive contract with A Entertainment on January 11, 2019. He held a fan meeting in Japan two months later and began working on a solo record under the company. He released his debut mini-album Distance and its lead single "Questions" on June 21. On August 21, Zelo sent A Entertainment a contract termination letter citing unpaid wages, but the agency did not agree to the termination. In a lawsuit, the Seoul Central District Court ruled in favor of the plaintiff and certified the contract annulment one year later.

Zelo released the collaborative single "Shower" with rappers Lil Oppa and Jvde on January 5, 2020. He released his second mini-album Day2Day and its lead single "She and Malibu" on April 18.

In August 2022, Zelo signed with Uzurocks.

He participated in the survival show Artistock Game in October 2022 and finished in 8th place overall.

He enlisted for his mandatory military service on December 12, 2023, and was discharged on June 11, 2025.

He signed a contract with Vlacksquad and released the single "Cola Comigo" on March 31, 2026.

He was invited to perform at Waterbomb in Seoul on July 25, 2026. He is set to release the single album "Ela" on the 29th.

== Artistry and influences ==
Zelo was the second rapper of the group. Zelo cites will.i.am and Kanye West as his role models. He also named 50 Cent and other rappers as his musical influences.

== Discography ==
=== Extended plays ===
Title	Album details	Peak positions	Sales
Title	Album details	KOR	Sales
Distance	Released: June 21, 2019; Label: A Entertainment, Universal Music; Formats: CD, digital download; Track listing: 1. "Celebrity"; 2. "Questions (알고싶어)"; 3. "IDC"; 4. "Flash, Party!"; 5. "Distance"; 6. "Be Better"	27	KOR: 4,291
Day2Day	Released: April 18, 2020; Label: Stone Music, Genie Music; Formats: CD, digital download; Track listing: 1. "Realization Time (Party 다니면 오지 현타)"; 2. "She and Malibu (그녀와는 말리부)"; 3. "Breathless (똥파리)"; 4. "Why"; 5. "Moon Walk"; 6. "You Are Not An Artist"	—	—N/a
Scarecrow	Released: September 15, 2020; Label: Stone Music, Genie Music; Formats: digital download; Track listing: 1. "Possessed (홀려)"; 2. "Sunrise (난 널)"; 3. "Overnight"; 4. "Butterfly"	—	—N/a
Enough	Released: December 2, 2023; Label: Stone Music, Genie Music; Formats: digital download; Track listing: 1. "Possessed (홀려)"; 2. "Sunrise (난 널)"; 3. "Overnight"; 4. "Butterfly"	—	—N/a
"—" denotes releases that did not chart or were not released in that region.

=== Single albums ===
Title	Details
Cola Comigo	Released: March 31, 2026; Label: Vlacksquad, Universal Music Group; Formats: digital download, streaming
Ela	Released: July 31, 2026; Label: Vlacksquad, Universal Music Group; Formats: digital download, streaming

=== Singles ===
==== As lead artist ====
Title	Year	Peak chart positions	Album
Title	Year	KOR	Album
"Never Give Up" (Bang&Zelo featuring Heritage)	2011	65	Non-album single
"Howler"	2018	—	B.A.P Concert Special Solo 'The Recollection'
"Questions" (알고싶어; Algosipeo)	2019	—	Distance
"Shower" (샤워; Syawo) (with Lil Oppa and Jvde)	2020	—	Non-album single
"She and Malibu" (그녀와는 말리부; Geunyeowaneun Mallibu)	2020	—	Day2Day
"Mi Amor" (미아모르; Mi Amoreu)	2020	—	Scarecrow
"Fault" (티 내줘; Ti Naejwo)	2020	—	Scarecrow
"Why Am I So Lonely"	2020	—	Scarecrow
"Blame" (featuring Jvde Milez)	2020	—	Non-album singles
"On a Roll"	2021	—	Non-album singles
"Back on the Road"	2021	—	Non-album singles
"Deadline"	2022	—	Non-album singles
"Smile"	2022	—	Non-album singles
"Possessed"	2023	—	Non-album singles
"Sunrise"	2023	—	Enough
"Cola Comigo"	2026	—	Cola Comigo
"Ela"	2026	—	Ela
"—" denotes releases that did not chart or were not released in that region.

==== As featured artist ====
style="width:16em;"|Title	Year	Release
"R(x)play" (V-Hawk featuring Zelo)	2015	Non-album single
"Shadow" (Jung Dae-hyun featuring Zelo)	2017	Dae Hyun X Jong Up Project Album 'Party Baby'
"Stay with Me" (Youngjae featuring Zelo)	2018	B.A.P Concert Special Solo 'The Recollection'
"Annoying" (짜증이 나; Jjajeungi Na) (Jongup featuring Zelo)	2018	B.A.P Concert Special Solo 'The Recollection'
"You, Me and Us" (너와 나 우리; Neowa Na Uri) (Lee Ye-jun featuring Zelo of B.A.P)	2019	Municon Vol.2

=== Guest appearances ===
List of non-single guest appearances, with other performing artists, showing year released and album name
Title	Year	Other performer(s)	Release	Ref.
"Vintage"	2013	Song Ji-eun	Hope Torture	

== Concerts ==
- 2026 ZELO FAN CONCERT [COMIGO : NEXT CHAPTER]
