= TS Entertainment =

South Korean record label

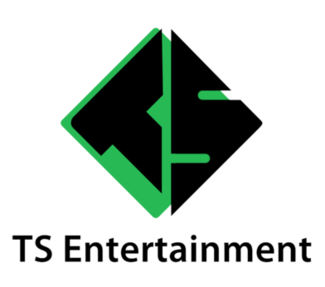
- Company type: Private
- Industry: Music, entertainment
- Genre: K-pop, hip hop, R&B, dance
- Founded: October 8, 2008; 17 years ago
- Founder: Kim Tae-song
- Defunct: January 31, 2021; 5 years ago
- Fate: Allegations of mistreatment, physical abuse, extortion, criminal battery, and unfair conditions and profits through lawsuits
- Headquarters: Seoul, South Korea
- Services: Music Production, Artist Management
- Revenue: 9 Million USD (2014)

TS Entertainment (also known as TS ENTER (Korean: 티에스이엔티이알)) was a South Korean record label and entertainment agency founded in 2008 by Kim Tae‑song (김태송). It was located at Hannam-dong, Yongsan-gu, Seoul, South Korea. The company was responsible for managing idol groups such as Untouchable, Secret, B.A.P., Sonamoo, and TRCNG.

Throughout the 2010s, TS Entertainment became known for multiple lawsuits from its artists and staff involving workplace abuse, extortion, and failure to pay company employees. The company quietly shut down in January 2021, with the rest of its artists' contracts expiring by 2022.

== History ==
TS Entertainment was founded by Kim Tae-song in October 2008. The company signed Untouchable as their first artist and released their debut single "It's Okay" in the same month.

In October 2009, TS Entertainment officially debuted the four-member girl group Secret. They were first introduced to the public through the reality show Secret Story on Mnet. On October 13, 2009, Secret's debut single "I Want You Back" was released.

In July 2011, TS Entertainment established themselves outside South Korea through the formation of TS Japan in Tokyo, Japan.

In January 2012, TS Entertainment debuted a six-member boy band named B.A.P. The members were introduced in a documentary show, Ta-Dah, It's B.A.P which first aired on SBS MTV Korea on January 8, 2012.

On December 29, 2014, TS Entertainment debuted a seven-member girl group named Sonamoo.

On October 10, 2017, they debuted boy group TRCNG.

On April 28, 2018, TS Entertainment's CEO and founder Kim Tae-song, died.

On September 26, 2019, it was announced that a former employee of TS Entertainment reported the label to the Ministry of Employment and Labor due to overdue payments, which was later forwarded to the prosecution.

On January 31, 2021, TS Entertainment privately shut down and deleted its website.

In March 2023, it was confirmed that a genuine MAMA trophy of B.A.P, a group formerly handled by TS Entertainment, was bought at a flea market in the Philippines. The findings caused outrage among fans, who believed that TS Entertainment likely threw away B.A.P's first ever award after the company closed down, until it landed on a flea market in the Philippines.

== Legal issues ==
=== B.A.P's lawsuit ===
On November 27, 2014, the six members of B.A.P collectively filed a lawsuit against TS Entertainment in order to nullify their contracts, claiming unfair conditions and profit distribution. The following day, TS Entertainment issued a press release refuting the claims made, stating that "there have been neither such maltreatments to the artists nor unfair clauses in the contract". On August 1, 2015, B.A.P. returned to TS Entertainment as both parties reached a settlement.

=== Jieun and Hyoseong's lawsuit ===
On February 28, 2018, It was reported that Jieun and Hyoseong had legal disputes, by on 2017, Jieun submitted the request for the Korean Commercial Arbitration Board, following this, Jieun results announced her departure from Secret and the company, so she took her post from her via Instagram.

On March 5, Hyoseong was first to fill a civil lawsuit, in order to terminate from her contract and her company, later she also announced her departure from Secret, and for this the agency had sent to Jun Hyoseong, the contract of the company will be valid to the ends of terms, following to the departures of TS Entertainment, effectively ending Secret.

=== Sleepy's lawsuit ===
On September 14, 2019, it was revealed that Sleepy of Untouchable had filed a lawsuit to terminate his contract with TS Entertainment, citing lack of trust after they refused to show him payment documents and a physical copy of his contract. Sleepy also said that he did not receive any payment for his activities until 10 years after his contract was signed. TS later denied these statements, saying all of Sleepy's claims were "false" and that he embezzled funds from the company, which Sleepy denied. The next day, it was announced TS Entertainment was forwarded to prosecution for overdue payments of artists.

=== Sumin and Nahyun's lawsuits ===
On September 23, 2019, it was announced that Sumin and Nahyun of Sonamoo were filing a lawsuit against TS Entertainment to terminate their contracts after the company failed to end their contracts following the two sending TS Entertainment certifications of content back in May. TS Entertainment released a statement on the same day, claiming that the two members suddenly "cut contact" with the company and group after the documents were sent. The statement also announced Sonamoo would continue as a five-member group.

=== Wooyeop and Taeseon's lawsuit ===
On November 4, 2019, TRCNG members Wooyeop and Taeseon sent a certification of contents to terminate their contracts with TS Entertainment, while also filing a criminal complaint against the company, accusing company executives and employees of child abuse, criminal battery, and extortion. They alleged that they were forced to practice choreography from 5 pm until 5 am, only to return to work at 10 am. They claimed that while under the age of eighteen, they were forced to live under poor living conditions in a dorm, alleging that no proper meals were provided; that the dorm had issues with electricity cutting out; and that it had broken air conditioners, plumbing, and water purifying systems. Wooyeop also alleged that he was once beaten using a metal chair by Yoon, the head of TRCNG's choreography team. Taeseon also alleged that he was regularly beaten from the moment he became a trainee.

== Former artists ==
=== Former recording artists ===
- Untouchable (2008–2019)
  - Sleepy (2008–2019)
  - D.Action (2008–2019)
- Secret (2009–2018)
  - Han Sun-hwa (2009–2016)
  - Jun Hyo-seong (2009–2018)
  - Song Ji-eun (2009–2018)
  - Jung Ha-na (2009–2021)
- B.A.P. (2012–2019)
  - Yongguk (2012–2018)
  - Zelo (2012–2018)
  - Himchan (2012–2019)
  - Daehyun (2012–2019)
  - Youngjae (2012–2019)
  - Jongup (2012–2019)
- Sonamoo (2014–2021)
  - Sumin (2014–2019)
  - Nahyun (2014–2019)
  - Euijin (2014–2021)
  - Minjae (2014–2021)
  - NewSun (2014–2021)
  - D.ana (2014–2021)
  - High.D (2014–2021)
- TRCNG (2017–2022)
  - Taeseon (2017–2019)
  - Wooyeop (2017–2019)
  - Jihun (2017–2022)
  - Hayoung (2017–2022)
  - Hakmin (2017–2022)
  - Jisung (2017–2022)
  - Hyunwoo (2017–2022)
  - Siwoo (2017–2022)
  - Hohyeon (2017–2022)
  - Kangmin (2017–2022)

=== Former actors ===
- Han Soo-yeon (2011–2017)
