= TS Entertainment discography =

This is a list of albums released under TS Entertainment.

== 2008-2009 ==
Released	Title	Artist	Format	Language
10 November 2008	It's Okay	Untouchable	Digital Download	Korean
8 January 2009	Quiet Storm	Untouchable	Studio Album, Digital Download	Korean
9 June 2009	Untouchable (1st EP)	Untouchable	Studio Album, Digital Download	Korean
13 October 2009	I Want You Back	Secret	Digital Download	Korean
15 December 2009	Yesterday	Secret	Single Album, Digital Download	Korean
11 December 2009	Merry Christmas	Untouchable	Digital Download	Korean

== 2010 ==
Released	Title	Artist	Format	Language
4 February 2010	Living In The Heart	Untouchable	Mini Album, Digital Download	Korean
1 April 2010	Secret Time	Secret	Mini Album, Digital Download	Korean
15 June 2010	Merry Go Round	Untouchable	Digital Download	Korean
12 August 2010	Madonna	Secret	Mini Album, Digital Download	Korean
18 November 2010	Jiggy Get Down	Untouchable	Single Album, Digital Download	Korean
2 December 2010	Who's HOT	Untouchable	Studio Album, Digital Download	Korean
30 December 2010	Only One	Untouchable	Mini Album, Digital Download	Korean

== 2011 ==
Released	Title	Artist	Format	Language
6 January 2011	Shy Boy	Secret	Single Album, Digital Download	Korean
3 March 2011	Going Crazy	Song Ji Eun	Single Album, Digital Download	Korean
4 May 2011	You You	Untouchable	Digital Download	Korean
1 June 2011	Starlight Moonlight	Secret	Single Album, Digital Download	Korean
12 August 2011	"I Remember" (feat. Yang Yo-seob of Beast)	Bang Yong-guk	Digital Download	Korean
12 August 2011	Madonna	Secret	Single Album, Digital Download	Japanese
16 November 2011	Shy Boy	Secret	Mini Album, Digital Download	Japanese
18 October 2011	Moving in Secret	Secret	Studio Album, Digital Download	Korean
25 November 2011	Never Give Up	Bang Zelo	Single Album, Digital Download	Korean

== 2012 ==
Released	Title	Artist	Format	Language
26 January 2012	Warrior	B.A.P	Single Album, Digital Download	Korean
29 February 2012	So Much for Goodbye	Secret	Single Album, Digital Download	Japanese
27 April 2012	Power	B.A.P	Single Album, Digital Download	Korean
13 June 2012	Twinkle Twinkle	Secret	Single Album, Digital Download	Japanese
19 July 2012	No Mercy	B.A.P	Mini Album, Digital Download	Korean
22 August 2012	Welcome to Secret Time	Secret	Studio Album, Digital Download	Japanese
30 August 2012	Crash	B.A.P	Mini Album, Digital Download	Korean
13 September 2012	Poison	Secret	Mini Album, Digital Download	Korean
23 October 2012	Stop It	B.A.P	Single Album, Digital Download	Korean
4 December 2012	Talk That	Secret	Digital Download	Korean
27 December 2012	Everything is Pretty	Sunhwa & Youngjae	Digital Download	Korean

== 2013 ==
Released	Title	Artist	Format	Language
15 January 2013	Rain Sound	B.A.P	Digital Download	Korean
12 February 2013	One Shot	B.A.P	Mini Album, Digital Download	Korean
30 April 2013	Letter from Secret	Secret	Mini Album, Digital Download	Korean
28 June 2013	Coffee Shop	B.A.P	Digital Download	Korean
12 July 2013	Call Me	Untouchable	Single Album, Digital Download	Korean
17 July 2013	Hurricane	B.A.P	Digital Download	Korean
6 August 2013	Badman	B.A.P	Mini Album, Digital Download	Korean
30 September 2013	Hope Torture	Song Jieun	Single Album, Digital Download	Korean
11 November 2013	Trip	Untouchable	Mini Album, Digital Download	Korean
9 December 2013	Gift From Secret	Secret	Single Album, Digital Download	Korean

== 2014 ==
Released	Title	Artist	Format	Language
3 February 2014	First Sensibility	B.A.P	Studio Album, Digital Download	Korean
12 May 2014	Top Secret	Jun Hyo Sung	Single Album, Digital Download	Korean
11 August 2014	Secret Summer	Secret	Mini Album, Digital Download	Korean
24 June 2014	Take Out	Untouchable	Single Album, Digital Download	Korean
14 October 2014	25	Song Ji Eun	Mini Album, Digital Download	Korean
29 December 2014	Deja Vu	Sonamoo	Mini Album, Digital Download	Korean

== 2015 ==
Released	Title	Artist	Format	Language
7 May 2015	Fantasia	Jun Hyo Sung	Mini Album, Digital Download	Korean
15 June 2015	Cool Night (with Sleepy)	Song Ji Eun	Digital Download	Korean
20 July 2015	Cushion	Sonamoo	Mini Album, Digital Download	Korean
16 November 2015	Young, Wild & Free	B.A.P	Mini Album, Digital Download	Korean

== 2016 ==
Released	Title	Artist	Format	Language
22 February 2016	Carnival	B.A.P	Mini Album, Digital Download	Korean
28 March 2016	Colored	Jun Hyo Sung	Mini Album, Digital Download	Korean
29 June 2016	I Like U Too Much	Sonamoo	Mini Album, Digital Download	Korean
8 August 2016	Put 'Em Up	B.A.P	Single Album, Digital Download	Korean
7 November 2016	NOIR	B.A.P	Studio Album, Digital Download	Korean

== 2017 ==
Released	Title	Artist	Format	Language
9 January 2017	I Think I Love U	Sonamoo	Single album, Digital download	Korean
7 March 2017	Rose	B.A.P	Single album, Digital download	Korean
14 August 2017	Happy Box Pt. 1	Sonamoo	Single, Digital download	Korean
5 September 2017	Blue	B.A.P	Single album, Digital download	Korean
10 October 2017	New Generation	TRCNG	Extended play, Digital download	Korean
6 November 2017	Happy Box Pt. 2	Sonamoo	Single, Digital download	Korean
13 December 2017	Ego	B.A.P	Single album, Digital download	Korean

== 2018 ==
Released	Title	Artist	Format	Language
2 January 2018	Who Am I	TRCNG	Single album, Digital Download	Korean
4 April 2018	Spectrum	TRCNG	Single album, Digital Download	Korean
25 July 2018	Game Changer	TRCNG	Single album, Digital Download	Korean

== 2019 ==
Released	Title	Artist	Format	Language
17 May 2019	"Paradise"	TRCNG	Single, digital download	Korean
6 September 2019	Rising	TRCNG	Extended play, digital download	Korean
