= List of songs recorded by Secret =

This is an alphabetical list of the songs known to have been recorded or performed by the South Korean girl group Secret.

== 0–9 ==
Song	Writer	Album	Year	Notes
"1,2,3"	Hana, Brandon Fraley, Jamelle Fraley	Poison	2012	
"3 years and 6 months" (3 년 6 개월)	Kim Jiwon, Park Kyungwook	I Want You Back	2009	An acoustic version of the song appeared on Secret's 1st mini album, Secret Time.

== A ==
Song	Writer	Album	Year	Notes
"AMAZINGER"	Hana, Marco	Moving in Secret	2011	Hana solo song

== B ==
Song	Writer	Album	Year	Notes
"Bastard"	Isang-in	Moving in Secret	2011	
"B.O.Y (Because Of You)"	Park Soosuk, INOO	Letter from Secret	2013	

== C ==
Song	Writer	Album	Year	Notes
"Calling U"	Hana, Jeon Da Woon, MARCO	Poison	2012	A Japanese remake of the song was released in February 2014
"Christmas Magic"	Kang Ji Won, Kim Ki Bum, Junji Ishiwatari	Shy Boy	2011	Japanese remake of Starlight Moonlight arranged into Christmas version.
"Color of Love"	Junji Ishiwatari	So Much For Goodbye	2012	

== D ==
Song	Writer	Album	Year	Notes
"Daddy Long Legs (키다리 아저씨)"	Jung Hana, Park Soosuk, INOO	Letter from Secret	2013	
"Date Mate"	Song Jieun, Park Soosuk, INOO	Hope Torture	2013	Jieun solo song
"Do As You Please"	Hwang Sunjoon, Youngji	Secret Time	2010	
"Do It Better!" (잘해 더!)	Baekchan	Madonna	2010	Featuring Baekchan(백찬) of 8eight.
"Don't Know Women (여자를 몰라)"	J’Kyun, Marco	Top Secret	2014	Hyosung solo song (feat. J'Kyun)
"Don't Laugh" (웃지좀마; Eutji Jom Ma)	Hana, Im Sanghyuk, Jeon Daun	Moving in Secret	2011	A Japanese remake of the song was released in Shy Boy (EP) in November 2011.
"Don't Look At Me Like That"	StarTrack	25	2014	Jieun solo song

== E ==
Song	Writer	Album	Year	Notes
"Empty Space" (자리비움)	Im Sang Hyuk, Kim Kibum	Madonna	2010	

== F ==
Song	Writer	Album	Year	Notes
"Falling in Love"	Hana, Park Goo Seok	Poison	2012	
"Fantastic"	Marco	Gift From Secret	2013	
"Feel The Secret"	Park Sooseok, Inwoo	Secret Summer	2014	Intro song for their EP Secret Summer

== G ==
Song	Writer	Album	Year	Notes
"Going Crazy"	Bang Yong Guk, Kang Jiwon, Kim Kibum	none	2011	Song Jieun solo featuring Bang Yong Guk of B.A.P.
"Goodnight Kiss"	Duble Sidekick	Top Secret	2014	Hyosung solo song

== H ==
Song	Writer	Album	Year	Notes
"Hesitant" (줄듯말듯)	Hana, Mario, Hwang Sung Jin	Madonna	2010	
"Hope" (바래; Balae)	Im Sanghyuk, Jeon Daun	Moving in Secret	2011	
"Hope Torture"	Park Soosuk, INOO	Hope Torture	2013	Jieun solo song

== I ==
Song	Writer	Album	Year	Notes
"I'm In Love"	Duble Sidekick	Secret Summer	2014	
"I Do I Do"	Kang Jiwon, Kim Kibum	Gift From Secret	2013	A Japanese remake of the song was released in February 2014
"I Want You Back"	Kang Jiwon, Park Kwangwook, Sohn Junghwan, Sugabear	I Want You Back	2009	An acoustic version of the song appeared on Secret's 1st mini album, Secret Time.

== J ==
Song	Writer	Album	Year	Notes
"Janus"	Park Soosuk, INOO	25	2014	Intro for Jieun's first solo mini-album

== L ==
Song	Writer	Album	Year	Notes
"La Boum"	Park Soosuk, INOO	25	2014	Jieun solo song
"La La La" (랄랄라)	Hana, Marco	Madonna	2010	A Japanese remake of the song was released in Shy Boy (EP) in November 2011.
Lonely Night (밤이 싫어요)"	Crazysensibility, Jeon Dawoon, KZ	Top Secret	2014	Hyosung solo song
"Look At Me"	Marco	Secret Summer	2014	
"Love is Long" (恋はロング・ラン; Koi wa Rongu Ran)	Junji Ishiwatari	So Much For Goodbye	2012	
"Love is Move" (사랑은 MOVE; Sarangeun MOVE)	Kang Jiwon, Kim Kibum	Moving in Secret	2011	

== M ==
Song	Writer	Album	Year	Notes
"Madonna"	Kang Jiwon, Kim Kibum	Madonna	2010	A Japanese remake of the song was released in the country in August 2011.
"Magic"	Shinshadong Tiger, Kang Jiwon, Kim Kibum	Secret Time	2010	
"Melodrama" (멜로영화; Romantic Movie)	Lee Min Ki, Jeon Daun	Starlight Moonlight	2011	
"Movie Star"	Hana, Taebong-i, Ssaijyeo, Yeonpil	Moving in Secret	2011	A Japanese remake of the song was released in Shy Boy (EP) in November 2011.
"My Boy"	Lee Sangin, Park Kwangwook	Secret Time	2010	The song appeared on Secret's 1st Japanese CD single, Madonna, with a new arrangement.

== N ==
Song	Writer	Album	Year	Notes
"Neverland"	Inwoo	Moving in Secret	2011	
"No.1"	Marco	Shy Boy	2011	

== O ==
Song	Writer	Album	Year	Notes
"Oh! Honey" (오! 허니)	Kang Jiwon, Kim Kibum	Starlight Moonlight	2011	
"Only U"	Jung Hana, Jeon Dawoon, Marco	Letter from Secret	2013	A Japanese remake of the song was released in July 2014

== P ==
Song	Writer	Album	Year	Notes
"Poison"	Kang Ji Won, Kim Ki Bum	Poison	2012	

== R ==
Song	Writer	Album	Year	Notes
"Remember Me"	Kang Jiwon, Kim Kibum, Kim Sungwon	Gift From Secret	2013	

== S ==
Song	Writer	Album	Year	Notes
"Sexy" (섹시하게)	Kim Kibum, Marco	Moving in Secret	2011	
"Shy Boy" (샤이보이)	Kang Jiwon, Kim Kibum	Shy Boy	2011	A Japanese remake of the song was released in Shy Boy (EP) in November 2011.
"Snowmelt (사르륵)"	Park Sooseok, INOO	Gift From Secret	2013	
"So Much For Goodbye"	Im Sanghyuk, Jeon Daun, Junji Ishiwatari	So Much For Goodbye	2012	
"Spotlight"	Kang Jiwon, Kim Shiwoo	Secret Time	2010	
"Star (별)"	Song Jieun	25	2014	Jieun solo song
"Starlight Moonlight" (별빛달빛)	Kang Jiwon, Kim Kibum	Starlight Moonlight	2011	

== T ==
Song	Writer	Album	Year	Notes
"Talk That"	Shinsadong Tiger	none	2012	
"Telepathy"	Kang Ji Won, Kim Ki Bum	Poison	2012	
"Together"	Hana, Twelve	Moving in Secret	2011	
"Twenty-Five (예쁜 나이 25살)"	Duble Sidekick, David Kim	25	2014	Jieun solo song

== U ==
Song	Writer	Album	Year	Notes
"U R Fired"	Park Sooseok, Inwoo	Secret Summer	2014	

== V ==
Song	Writer	Album	Year	Notes
"Vintage"	Park Sooseok, Inwoo	Hope Torture	2013	Jieun solo song feat. Zelo of B.A.P

== W ==
Song	Writer	Album	Year	Notes
"Would Do Well"	Marco	Secret Summer	2014	

== Y ==
Song	Writer	Album	Year	Notes
"Yesterday"	Hwanhee	none	2009	Song Jieun solo.
"YooHoo"	Kang Jiwon, Kim Kibum	Letter from Secret	2013	A Japanese remake of this song was released in July 2014

== Other songs ==
Song	Writer	Album	Year	Notes
"Friends"		God of Study OST	2009	
"It's Cold"		Take Care of us Captain OST	2012	Song Jieun solo.
"Let's Go!"		none	2010	Song Jieun as part of the G20 Seoul Summit.
"Secret Love"	Bang Yong Guk, Kang Jiwon	Warrior	2012	A song of B.A.P featuring Song Jieun.

== See also ==
- Secret discography
- Secret videography
- List of awards and nominations received by Secret
