= Secret videography =

Secret video discography
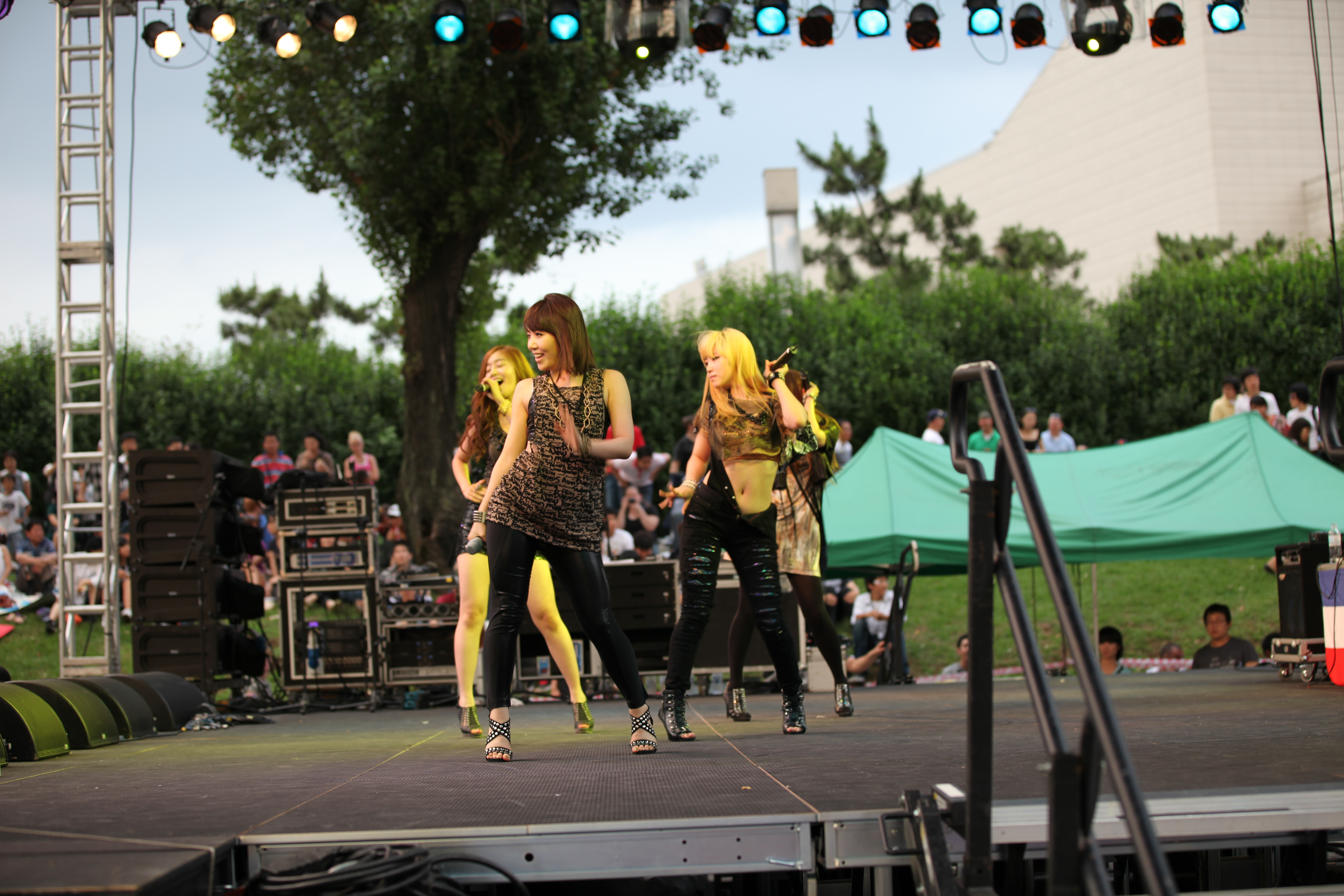
- Secret performing Magic at the Independence Day Festival, Seoul, South Korea.
- Music videos: 12
- Concert tour videos: 1
- Video compilations: 2
- Video singles: 1
- Promotional videos: 3

The videography of South Korean K-Pop band Secret consists of twelve music videos, 1 concert tour video, 2 music video compilations, 1 music video single and three promotional videos. In 2009, Secret signed a recording contract with TS Entertainment and released their first single "I Want You Back" which became their first music video. Secret's first music video to receive attention in South Korea was "Magic" and became one of their popular songs because of its choreography. The same year, the group released "Madonna", which featured a sophisticated image for them, as the song lyrically tells about living with confidence by becoming an icon in this generation, like the music icon Madonna. In early to mid-2011, the group departed from their sexy image and released "Shy Boy". The song ushered a new image for Secret which was inspired by the American 50's fashion and features a "cutesy" concept. Secret continued to channel the image of their previous single with the release of "Starlight Moonlight" and maintained the "retro" theme.

In July and November 2011, the group began to expand in Japan with the release of the Japanese remake of "Madonna" and "Shy Boy". In December 2011, the group released a Christmas version of "Starlight Moonlight" entitled "Christmas Magic". The same year, Secret released their first studio album in two years entitled Moving in Secret. The lead single, "Love is Move" featured the genre of surf rock and signaled the return from their sexy image. In 2012, Secret released the ballad "So Much For Goodbye" in Japan, which portrayed the vocal side of Secret.

== Music videos ==
=== 2000s ===
Year	Music video	Length	Notes
2009	"I Want You Back"	4:22	
2009	"3 years and 6 months"	5:50	Live version performance.

=== 2010s ===
Year	Music video	Length	Notes
2010	"Magic"	3:32	
2010	"Madonna"	3:42	
2011	"Shy Boy"	3:46	
2011	"Starlight Moonlight"	4:54	
2011	"Madonna" (Japanese version)	3:50	
2011	"Love is Move"	3:26	
2011	"Shy Boy" (Japanese version)	3:41	
2011	"Christmas Magic"	3:55	
2012	"So Much For Goodbye"	3:41	
2012	"Twinkle Twinkle"	3:26	
2012	"Love is Move" (Japanese version)	3:22	
2012	"Poison"	4:44	
2012	"Talk That"	3:56	
2012	"Talk That" (Dance version)	3:36	
2013	"YooHoo"	3:33	
2013	"I Do I Do"	4:46	
2014	"I Do I Do" (Japanese version)	4:41	Also known as 日本語版, this is the first Japanese music video of Secret to be handled by Kiss Entertainment and is also the first of their Japanese music videos that is not exclusively to be viewed only in Japan.
2014	"YooHoo" (Japanese version)	3:29	
2014	"I'm In Love"	3:37	

=== Related music videos ===
Year	Music video	Length	Notes
2010	"Let's Go!"	3:35	Song Jieun's participation from the OST of G20 Seoul Summit 2010.
2011	"Going Crazy"	4:23	Song Jieun's song featuring B.A.P's Bang Yong Guk's and Kim Him Chan's.
2011	"Never Give Up"	4:27	Jun Hyoseong playing as Zelo's love interest. "Never Give Up" is a song by B.A.P's sub-unit Bang&Zelo.
2012	"It's Cold"	4:20	Song Jieun's solo from the OST of Take Care of us Captain.
2012	"Everything Is Pretty"	3:12	Sunhwa and B.A.P's Youngjae duet.
2013	"Hope Torture (False Hope)"	3:21	Song Jieun's second solo.
2014	"Good-night Kiss"	3:56	Jun Hyoseong's debut music video as a solo artist.
2014	"Don't Look At Me Like That"	3:46	Song Jieun's pre-release track for her debut mini album 25
2014	"Pretty Age 25"	3:40	Song Jieun's title track for her debut mini album 25
2015	"Into You"	4:08	Jun Hyoseong's title track for her debut mini album Fantasia
2016	"Bobby Doll"	3:21	Song Jieun's title track for her second mini album Bobby Doll

== Commercial Film (CF) Official Video ==
=== Grand Mer ===
Year	Date	Title	Length	Notes
2011	February 7	그랑메르 Grand Mer	0:49	Congratulatory message
2011	February 10	그랑메르 Grand Mer CF 1	0:52	Secret
2011	February 11	그랑메르 Grand Mer CF 2	0:37	Hyoseong and Jieun
2011	February 15	그랑메르 Grand Mer CF 3	0:35	Sunhwa and Hana

=== Nike ===
Year	Date	Title	Length	Notes
2011	April 3	NIKE WOMEN'S RACE TEASER	0:34	
2011	April 18	NIKE WOMEN'S RACE : SECRET	0:36	

=== Nene Chicken ===
Year	Date	Title	Length	Notes
2011	July 21	Nene Chicken CF (Starlight Moonlight)	0:25	Secret was selected as official models for the Korean fast-food chicken chain, 'NeNe Chicken'. In the commercial, Secret played as fairies and danced Starlight Moonlight's 'Baby Gorilla Dance' with Yoo Jae Suk acting as a chef.

=== Good Day Soju ===
Year	Date	Title	Length	Notes
2011	October 24	좋은데이_2011_시크릿CF	0:31	Starlight Moonlight version 1
2011	November 6	2011년 좋은데이 별빌달빛 시크릿 고화질	0:35	Starlight Moonlight version 2
2012	January 8	시크릿(Secret) Good day	0:35	Love is Move version

== Video albums ==
=== Concert tour videos ===
Year	Video details	Notes
2011	Shy Boy EP (Japanese version Type B): Released: November; Label: TS Entertainment, Sony Music Japan; Format: CD+DVD	CD contains the tracks of the standard edition. DVD contains performances from Secret's premium debut showcase in Japan. Performed songs includes, "Magic", "La la la", "My Boy", "Empty Space" and "Madonna".

=== Music video compilations ===
Year	Video details	Notes
2011	Madonna (Japanese version Type A): Released: November 2011; Label: TS Entertainment, Sony Music Japan; Format: CD+DVD	CD includes the standard edition tracks. DVD contains the original music video and dance version.
2011	Shy Boy EP (Japanese version Type A): Released: November 2011; Label: TS Entertainment, Sony Music Japan; Format: CD+DVD	CD contains the standard edition tracks. DVD contains "Shy Boy" Japanese version's original music video, dance version and behind the scenes footage.

=== Promotional videos ===
Year	Video details	Notes
2011	Madonna (Japanese version Type B): Released: November 2011; Label: TS Entertainment, Sony Music Japan; Format: CD+DVD	CD includes the standard edition tracks. DVD includes behind the scene footage of the music video for "Madonna" Japanese version.
2012	So Much For Goodbye (Type A): Released: February 2012; Label: TS Entertainment, Sony Music Japan; Format: CD+DVD	CD includes the standard edition tracks. DVD includes official music video of "So Much For Goodbye" and a short interview.
2012	So Much For Goodbye (Type B): Released: February 2012; Label: TS Entertainment, Sony Music Japan; Format: CD+DVD	CD includes the standard edition tracks. DVD contains behind the scenes footage of the music video of "So Much For Goodbye".

== Video singles ==
Year	Video details	Notes
2011	" Shy Boy (EP) Christmas Edition": Released: December 2011; Label: TS Entertainment, Sony Music Japan; Format: CD+DVD	CD contains the tracks of the standard edition. DVD contains music video for "Christmas Magic".

== See also ==
- Secret discography
- List of songs by Secret
- List of awards and nominations received by Secret
