= Secret discography =

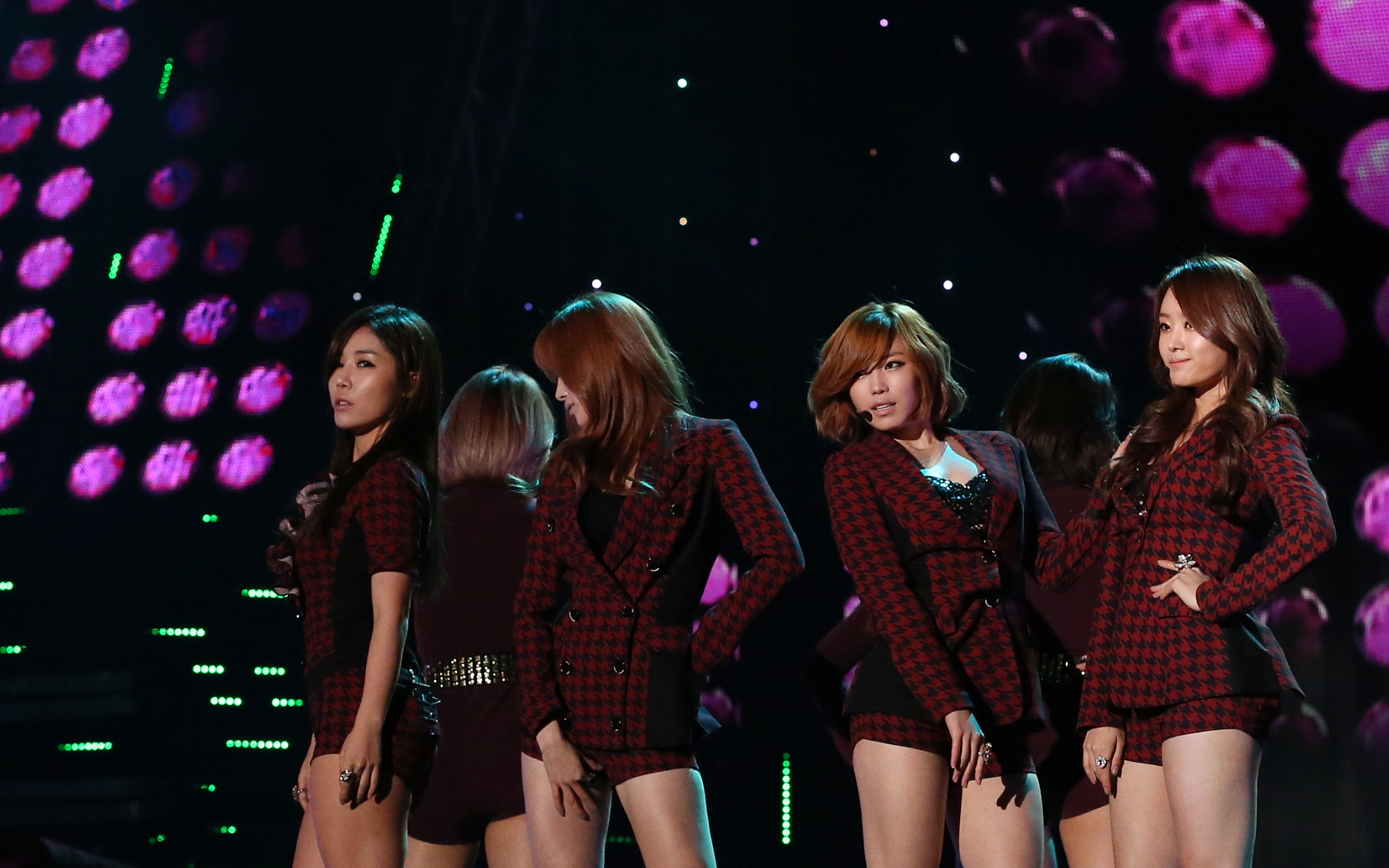
- Secret at the 2012 K-POP World Festival in Changwon, South Korea
- Studio albums: 2
- Extended plays: 7
- Soundtrack albums: 1
- Singles: 16
- Music videos: 21

The discography of the South Korean girl group, Secret, consists of two studio albums, seven extended plays, sixteen singles, twenty-one music videos, and one soundtrack.

In 2009, Secret released their debut single, "I Want You Back". In 2010, they released two EPs: Secret Time and Madonna. In 2011, they released two singles, "Shy Boy" and Starlight Moonlight. In the same year, Secret also made their Japanese debut with their first single, "Madonna". They then released their first full-length Korean studio album, Moving in Secret, in October 2011. A month later, the group released their first Japanese EP, Shy Boy. In 2012, the group released two Japanese singles, "So Much For Goodbye" and "Twinkle Twinkle", prior to releasing their first full-length Japanese album, "Welcome to Secret Time". In September 2012, Secret released their third Korean EP, Poison, followed by their second digital single, "Talk That", in December 2012. In 2013, they released their fourth EP, Letter from Secret, and one single album, Gift From Secret. In 2014, they released two Japanese singles which were Japanese versions of "I Do I Do" and "YooHoo". Later that year, their fifth Korean EP, Secret Summer, was released. In 2026, the group reunited as a trio with new member Kim Ye-bin and released their sixth Korean extended play Secret Flavor.

== Albums ==
=== Studio albums ===
Title	Album details	Peak chart positions		Sales
Title	Album details	KOR	JPN	Sales
Moving in Secret	Released: October 18, 2011 (KOR); Label: TS Entertainment; Format: CD, digital download, streaming	3	—	KOR: 17,304
Welcome to Secret Time	Released: August 22, 2012 (JPN); Label: Sony Music Associated Records; Format: CD, digital download, streaming	—	11	JPN: 12,249+
"—" denotes releases that did not chart or were not released in that region.

== Extended plays ==
Title	Details	Peak chart positions		Sales
Title	Details	KOR	JPN	Sales
Secret Time	Released: April 1, 2010 (KOR); Label: TS Entertainment; Format: CD, digital download, streaming	4	—	
Madonna	Release: August 12, 2010 (KOR); Label: TS Entertainment; Format: CD, digital download, streaming	5	—	
Shy Boy	Released: November 16, 2011 (JPN); Label: Sony Music Associated Records; Format: CD, digital download, streaming	—	9	JPN: 14,602+
Poison	Release: September 13, 2012 (KOR); Label: TS Entertainment; Format: CD, digital download, streaming	3	170	KOR: 11,159; JPN: 667+
Letter from Secret	Release: April 30, 2013 (KOR); Label: TS Entertainment; Format: CD, digital download, streaming	7	—	KOR: 8,690; JPN: 1,335+
Secret Summer	Release: August 11, 2014 (KOR); Label: TS Entertainment; Format: CD, digital download, streaming	2	—	KOR: 10,931; JPN: 731+
Secret Flavor	Release: June 18, 2026 (KOR); Label: RBW; Format: CD, digital download, streaming	87	—	KOR: 799
"—" denotes releases that did not chart or were not released in that region.

== Singles ==
Title	Year	Peak chart positions				Sales	Album
Title	Year	KOR	KOR Hot	JPN	JPN Hot	Sales	Album
Korean
"I Want You Back"	2009	—	—	—	—		Secret Time
"Magic"	2010	2	—	—	—	KOR: 2,287,835	Secret Time
"Madonna"	2010	1	—	—	—	KOR: 1,839,869	Madonna
"Shy Boy"	2011	2	—	—	—	KOR: 2,215,864; KOR: 21,294 (CD)	"Shy Boy"' (single)
"Starlight Moonlight"	2011	2	11	—	—	KOR: 3,017,000; KOR: 12,106 (CD)	"Starlight Moonlight" (single)
"Love is Move"	2011	3	3	—	—	KOR: 2,580,146	Moving in Secret
"Poison"	2012	4	8	—	—	KOR: 1,373,460	Poison
"Talk That"	2012	6	6	—	—	KOR: 979,364	"Talk That" (single)
"YooHoo"	2013	5	4	—	—	KOR: 978,757	Letter from Secret
"I Do I Do"	2013	15	23	—	—	KOR: 286,517; KOR: 5,051 (CD)	"Gift From Secret" (single)
"I'm in Love"	2014	13	—	—	—	KOR: 323,281	Secret Summer
"Ice Cream"	2026	—	—	—	—		Secret Flavor
Japanese
"Madonna"	2011	—	—	9	18	JPN (CD): 25,081+	Welcome to Secret Time
"So Much For Goodbye"	2012	—	—	17	55	JPN (CD): 10,043+	Welcome to Secret Time
"Twinkle Twinkle"	2012	—	—	16	63	JPN (CD): 8,022+	Welcome to Secret Time
"I Do I Do"	2014	—	—	14	65	JPN (CD): 8,457	Non-album singles
"YooHoo"	2014	—	—	17	69	JPN (CD): 6,106	Non-album singles
"—" denotes releases that did not chart or were not released in that region.

== Other charted songs ==
Title	Year	Peak chart positions		Album
Title	Year	KOR	KOR Hot	Album
"My Boy"	2010	129	—	Secret Time
"Spot Light"	2010	146	—	Secret Time
"Do As You Please"	2010	150	—	Secret Time
"Empty Space"	2010	151	—	Madonna
"Do It Better" (feat. Baekchan of 8eight)	2010	165	—	Madonna
"Lalala"	2010	178	—	Madonna
"Hesitant"	2010	199	—	Madonna
"No. 1"	2011	190	—	Shy Boy (single)
"Oh! Honey"	2011	76	—	Starlight Moonlight (single)
"Melodrama"	2011	136	—	Starlight Moonlight (single)
"Sexy"	2011	104	—	Moving in Secret
"Don't Laugh"	2011	113	—	Moving in Secret
"Movie Star"	2011	120	—	Moving in Secret
"I Hope"	2011	149	—	Moving in Secret
"Together"	2011	151	—	Moving in Secret
"Neverland"	2011	154	—	Moving in Secret
"Bastard"	2011	162	—	Moving in Secret
"Amazinger"	2011	182	—	Moving in Secret
"Calling U"	2012	121	72	Poison
"Falling in Love"	2012	181	95	Poison
"Telepathy"	2012	184	57	Poison
"Only U"	2013	75	61	Letter from Secret
"B.O.Y (Because of You)"	2013	126	—	Letter from Secret
"Daddy Long Legs"	2013	151	—	Letter from Secret
"Remember Me"	2013	160	—	Gift From Secret (single)
"—" denotes releases that did not chart or were not released in that region

== Soundtracks ==
Year	Title	Drama
2010	"Friends"	Master of Study OST
2014	"Ari Arirang" (아리 아리랑 with Minuisik)	Arirang: The Name of Korean Vol. 4
2016	"Beautiful World" (among various artists)	Hooxi, The Beginning

== Music videos ==
List of music videos, showing year released with directors
Title	Year	Director(s)	Ref.
Korean
"I Want You Back"	2009	Unknown	
"3 Years and 6 Months"	2009	Unknown	
"Magic"	2010	Hong Won-ki	
"Madonna"	2010	Hong Won-ki	
"Shy Boy"	2011	Hong Won-ki	
"Starlight Moonlight"	2011	Hong Won-ki	
"Love is Move"	2011	Hong Won-ki	
"Poison"	2012	Hong Won-ki	
"Talk That"	2012	Hong Won-ki	
"YooHoo"	2013	Hong Won-ki	
"I Do I Do"	2013	Hong Won-ki	
"I'm in Love"	2014	Hong Won-ki	
"Ice Cream"	2026	Kang Ji-won, Kim Ki-bum	
Japanese
"Christmas Magic"	2011	Hong Won-ki	
"Madonna"	2012	Hong Won-ki	
"Shy Boy"	2012	Hong Won-ki	
"So Much For Goodbye"	2012	Hong Won-ki	
"Twinkle Twinkle"	2012	Hong Won-ki	
"Love is Move"	2012	Hong Won-ki	
"I Do I Do"	2014	Hong Won-ki	
"YooHoo"	2014	Hong Won-ki	

== See also ==
- Secret videography
- List of songs by Secret
- List of awards and nominations received by Secret
