= List of awards and nominations received by Secret =

Secret awards and nominations
Awards and nominations
Award	Wins	Nominations
Circle Chart Music	2	0
Golden Disc	3	4
MAMA	0	5
Melon Music	1	2
MTV Korea	0	7
Seoul Music	3	2
Asia Model Festival Awards	1	0
Korean Culture Entertainment Awards	1	0

Totals (Note: Certain award groups do not simply award one winner. They acknowledge several different recipients, have runners-up, and have third place. Since this is a specific recognition and is different from losing an award, runner-up mentions are considered wins in this award tally. For simplification and to avoid errors, each award in this list has been presumed to have had a prior nomination.)
- Wins: 11
- Nominations: 23

Secret is a four-member South Korean girl group formed by TS Entertainment in 2009. Secret debuted with the song "I Want You Back" on October 13, 2009. In 2010, the group released their hit single "Magic" which was nominated at the 12th Mnet Asian Music Awards for Best Dance Performance by a Female Group. The same year, the group released their number one hit single "Madonna" which won them a Bonsang award at the 20th Seoul Music Awards. With the success of "Magic" and "Madonna", the group received the "Newcomer award" at the 25th Golden Disk Awards.

"Shy Boy" earned the group's first win in Mnet's M! Countdown and SBS's Inkigayo. The song was their first Triple Crown in KBS's Music Bank and garnered them multiple awards and nominations. The song was nominated for Song of the Year and Best Dance Performance by a Female Group at the 13th Mnet Asian Music Awards. The song won a Bonsang award at the 21st Seoul Music Awards and at the 3rd Melon Music Awards. The song also won the Songs of the Year Award at the 1st Gaon Chart Awards for the month of January. Following the success of "Shy Boy", Secret released Starlight Moonlight in June 2011. The song earned them their second win in Inkigayo and won them a Digital Bonsang award at the 26th Golden Disk Award. In 2012, "Starlight Moonlight" won the Songs of the Year Award in the 1st Gaon Chart Awards for the month of June.

== Major awards ==
=== Asia Model Awards ===
The Asia Model Awards is an award show that honors people who have excelled in the entertainment industry such as in music, modelling, movies and dramas. In 2011, Secret won the "Popular Singer Award" at the 2011 Asia Model Awards.

Year	Category	Recipient	Result
2011	Popular Singer Award	Secret	Won

=== Gaon Chart Awards ===
The Gaon Chart Awards is a major music award show that is held annually in South Korea by the music portal Gaon Chart. The award show is reported to differentiate themselves from other music awards in that it will focus more on songs and albums rather than musicians. Secret has won two awards.

Year	Category	Recipient	Result
2012	Songs of the Year Award (January)	Shy Boy	Won
2012	Songs of the Year Award (June)	Starlight Moonlight	Won

=== Golden Disk Awards ===
The Golden Disk Awards is an award show founded in 1986 that is presented annually by the Music Industry Association of Korea for outstanding achievements in the music industry in South Korea. It is dubbed as the Korean Grammy Awards. Secret has been nominated four times and has won two awards.

Year	Category	Recipient	Result
2010	Newcomer Award	Secret	Won
2010	Popularity Award	Secret	Nominated
2011	Digital Bonsang	"Starlight Moonlight"	Won
2011	MSN Popularity Award	Secret	Nominated
2012	Digital Bonsang	"Poison"	Won
2013	Popularity Award	Secret	Nominated
2013	Disk Album Award	"YooHoo"	Nominated

Note: In South Korea, a bonsang award is given to the top 10 best performing artists, albums or singles during that year.

=== Korean Culture Entertainment Awards ===
The Korean Culture Entertainment Awards was first held in 1992 with the purpose of improving the quality of Korean culture and art, as well as promoting and developing local cultural content. Secret won the "New Generation Popular Teen Singer Award" in 2010.

Year	Category	Recipient	Result
2010	New Generation Popular Teen Singer Award	Secret	Won

=== Melon Music Awards ===
The Melon Music Awards is a major music award show that is held annually in South Korea. It is known for only calculating digital sales and online votes to judge winners. Secret has been nominated three times and has won one award.

Year	Category	Recipient	Result
2010	Best Music Video	"Madonna"	Nominated
2010	Newcomer Award	Secret	Nominated
2011	Bonsang	Secret	Won

Note: In South Korea, a bonsang award is given to the top 10 best performing artists, albums or singles during that year.

=== Mnet Asian Music Awards ===
The Mnet Asian Music Awards is a major music award show that is held by Mnet Media annually in South Korea, involving the participation of some of the most well-known actors and singers. Secret has been nominated three times.

Year	Category	Recipient	Result
2010	Best Dance Performance - Female Group	"Magic"	Nominated
2011	Best Dance Performance - Female Group	"Shy Boy"	Nominated
2011	Song Of The Year	"Shy Boy"	Nominated
2012	Best Dance Performance - Female Group	"Poison"	Nominated
2012	Song Of The Year	"Poison"	Nominated

=== Seoul Music Awards ===
The Seoul Music Awards is an award show founded in 1990 that is presented annually by the Sports Seoul for outstanding achievements in the music industry in South Korea. Secret has won three awards.

Year	Category	Recipient	Result
2010	Bonsang	"Madonna"	Won
2011	Bonsang	"Shy Boy"	Won
2012	Bonsang	"Poison"	Won
2013	Bonsang	"YooHoo"	Nominated
2013	Popularity Award	Secret	Nominated
2014	Bonsang	"Secret Summer"	Nominated
2014	Popularity Award	Secret	Nominated
2014	Hallyu Special Award	Secret	Nominated

Note: In South Korea, a bonsang award is given to the top 10 best performing artists, albums or singles during that year.

== Other awards ==
=== SBS MTV Best of the Best Awards ===
Year	Category	Recipient	Result
2011	Best Female Group	Secret	Nominated
2011	Global Star Award	Secret	Nominated
2011	Best Live Girl Group	Secret	Nominated
2011	Top Rival Award	Secret and f(x)	Nominated
2012	Best Female Group	Secret	Nominated
2012	Best Female Video	"Poison"	Nominated
2012	Top Rival Award	Secret and Orange Caramel	Nominated

== See also ==
- Secret discography
- Secret videography
- List of songs by Secret
