= Jun Hyo-seong =

South Korean singer (born 1989)

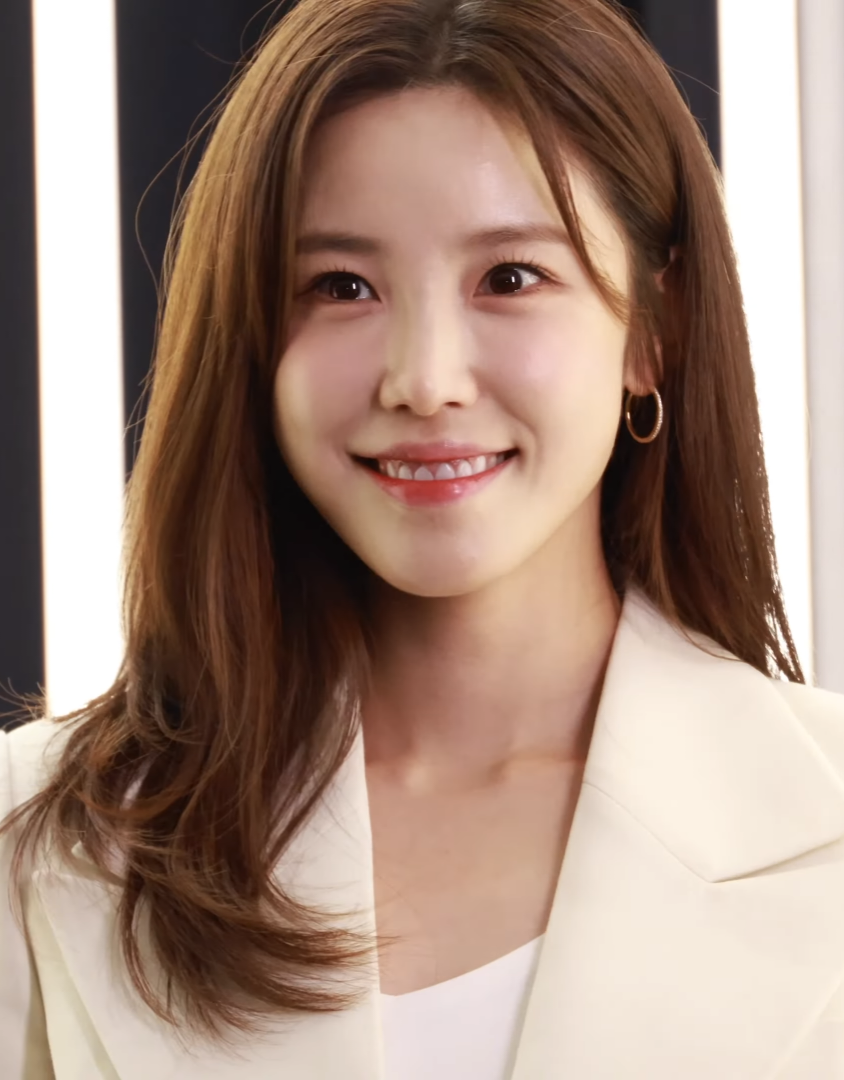
- Jun in August 2023
- Born: October 13, 1989 (age 37); Cheongju, South Korea
- Occupations: Singer; actress
- Agents: MAJOR9; RBW
- Musical career
- Genres: K-pop; R&B
- Instrument: Vocals
- Years active: 2007–present
- Labels: Good; TS; Tommy & Partners; JHS; RBW
- Member of: Secret
- Formerly of: Five Girls

Korean name
- Hangul: 전효성
- Hanja: 全烋星
- RR: Jeon Hyoseong
- MR: Chŏn Hyosŏng

Jun Hyo-seong (Korean: 전효성; born October 13, 1989), often simply known as Hyoseong or Hyosung, is a South Korean singer and actress.

In 2005, she was a finalist in Mnet's Battle Shinhwa which led to her signing a recording contract with Good Entertainment. In 2007, she was going to debut in the group Five Girls, with G.NA, Wonder Girls' Yubin, After School's Uee and former T-ara member and former Spica member Yang Jiwon; however, the group disbanded before they were able to debut due to the company's financial problems. Hyoseong was later discovered by TS Entertainment through a show aired on SBS MTV called Diary of Five Girls and spent two years with the company as a trainee. In 2009, she debuted with Song Jieun, Han Sunhwa and Jung Hana as the four-member girl group Secret. Hyoseong debuted as a solo artist in 2014.

== Life and career ==
=== 1989–2004: Early life and childhood ===
Jun Hyoseong was born in Cheongju, South Korea on October 13, 1989. Hyoseong's name is derived from the word '유성' which is Korean for 'meteor'. She was named this way as her father and maternal grandmother saw a shooting star across the sky on the day of her birth. Hyoseong's family struggled financially and she and her family earned extra money by delivering newspapers every morning since she was in 3rd grade. Ever since she was young, she was known amongst her friends for her singing and dancing skills. However, she never had thoughts of actually becoming a singer until she was in 6th grade. She admitted:

"I liked performing for others since I was little. I danced things to songs like Fin.K.L and SES at my friends' birthday parties. In 6th grade, I decided that I really wanted to become a singer, and all of my friends helped me try to make that dream come true."

In middle school, she was the leader of her school's dance club and worked part-time jobs to earn the money to travel to Seoul for auditions. Her parents were against her choice at first but later supported her decision when they saw how dedicated she was towards her goal.

=== 2005–2008: Career beginnings, planned debut with Five Girls and personal struggles ===
In 2005, Hyoseong failed her audition for talent shows hosted in Cheongju and Seoul. She later won an audition held earlier by the same management company in Cheongju in May 2005.

She was then advised by an agent at Good Entertainment to audition for Mnet's Battle Shinhwa and was picked as one of the final twelve participants and among them, three were females.

"I had about $30 for a month during my dorm life. But it didn't matter, because I could walk to school, so I only needed the money for bus fare to get to lessons. The company fed us, so that was no problem." However, when she got to 12th grade without any progress, she said, "I realized I couldn't just waste my time, so I started to prepare for college and started working at a part time job. A lot of people asked me when I was going to debut, but it wasn't as if I could do anything about it. I was happy that Yoobin debuted as a Wonder Girls member, but it made me wonder what I was doing." —Hyoseong, on her struggles after the disbandment of Five Girls

She was picked as the final 6 and later went on to sign a recording contract with Good Entertainment. She signed officially in 2006 and started to live in the dorms with Yoobin and Uee as a trainee and started going to school in Seoul. Good Entertainment had initially intended for Hyoseong to debut in a three-member group along with Yoobin and Uee, but ended up adding G.NA and Jiwon. They were set to debut as a five-member group called Five Girls. In 2007, before their official debut, the group starred in a reality show on MTV called Diary of Five Girls, but were never able to debut due to their company's financial issues.

In 2008, after Five Girls disbandment, she started working at a part-time job and managed to earn enough money to attend Inha University; however, her college life was short-lived: as only Uee and her were left in the company, Hyoseong thought she had to work hard and focus on lessons, so she dropped out of school.

During her 11th grade, her father was diagnosed with lung cancer, though he initially recovered after treatment. Her father was still weak when he decided to go back to work to support his family and the cancer recurred, this time being much more aggressive. The doctors told Hyoseong's family to "be ready". Her father died of lung cancer in 2008. At this point, Hyoseong was no longer a trainee with Good Entertainment and had decided to start attending college again. However, her plans changed when a TS Entertainment agent contacted her.

=== 2009–2014: Debut with Secret and rising popularity ===
In 2008, a TS Entertainment agent had seen Hyoseong in "Diary of Five Girls" and contacted her to audition for their company. Hyoseong passed the audition and began living as a TS Entertainment trainee. TS Entertainment announced that they would debut a four-member girl group in October 2009. Hyoseong, along with Han Sunhwa, Song Jieun and Jung Hana, debuted as the group, Secret. Prior to their debut, the group appeared in a documentary called "Secret Story" which chronicled their debut process. They released their debut single "I Want You Back" in October 2009.

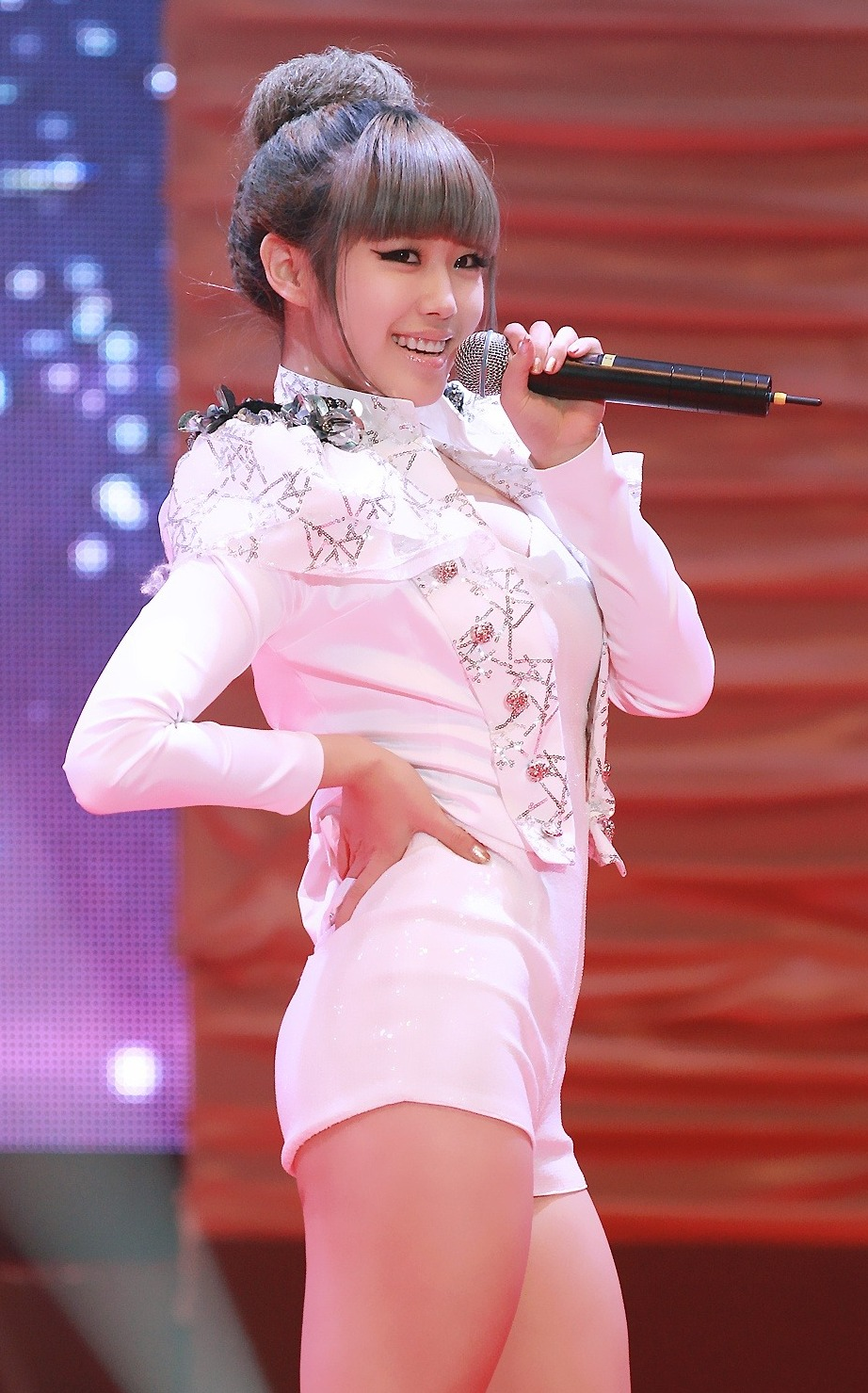
Hyoseong performing in 2010

In April 2010, Secret released their first mini album entitled Secret Time which spawned the hit single "Magic" and served as their breakthrough song in South Korea. In August 2010, they released their second mini album entitled "Madonna" and the title track continued their success as it topped the Gaon Single Charts.

In January 2011, the group deviated from their "sexy" and "sassy" image and released "Shy Boy", a "cutesy" and retro inspired song. Although they were worried with the 180 degrees transformation, the single exceeded their expectations as the song was a huge success. Shy Boy charted strongly in digital charts and Secret won their first trophy on music shows with the song. They won a total of 5 trophies in various music shows with Shy Boy. In March 2011, Hyoseong was chosen as a regular cast on KBS's Oh! My School. Secret continued their success with the release of their second CD single entitled "Starlight Moonlight". The title track became another hit for Secret as the song reached number one on the Gaon Monthly Singles Charts and won them another trophy in SBS's Inkigayo.

The same year, Secret began a foray of Japanese activities with the Japanese release of Madonna and Shy Boy. The Japanese remake of "Madonna" debuted at number nine in the Oricon singles charts. Secret was the third of three Korean girl groups to debut on the Oricon chart in the top 10, the others being Kara and Girls Generation. In October 2011, they released their first studio album entitled Moving in Secret and spawned them another hit with the lead single "Love is Move. Secret released their first mini album in Japan entitled Shy Boy. The mini album also debuted at number nine on the Oricon album charts.

On November 23, 2011, Hyoseong was injured after falling down a flight of stairs while leaving the dorm. The accident, which ruptured the cartilage in her left knee and fractured the top of her right foot, halted her promotional activities with Secret.

In February 2012, she played Soo Yeon in the sitcom Salamander Guru and The Shadows that aired on SBS.

On the October 21, 2012 episode of Inkigayo, the live music show revealed a teaser video hinting that twenty of the most-wanted K-pop stars would transform into four new project groups in the yearly event. Hyoseong will be part of the girl group Dazzling Red with Sistar's Hyolyn, 4minute's Hyuna, After School's Nana and KARA's Nicole. Brave Brothers was set to produce the group's new title song. Slated to air on December 29, the group will perform the tunes only one time on stage and the profits from online streaming and downloading of the songs would be donated to people in need. The song "This Person" was released on December 27, 2012.

=== 2014–2017: Solo debut and acting career ===
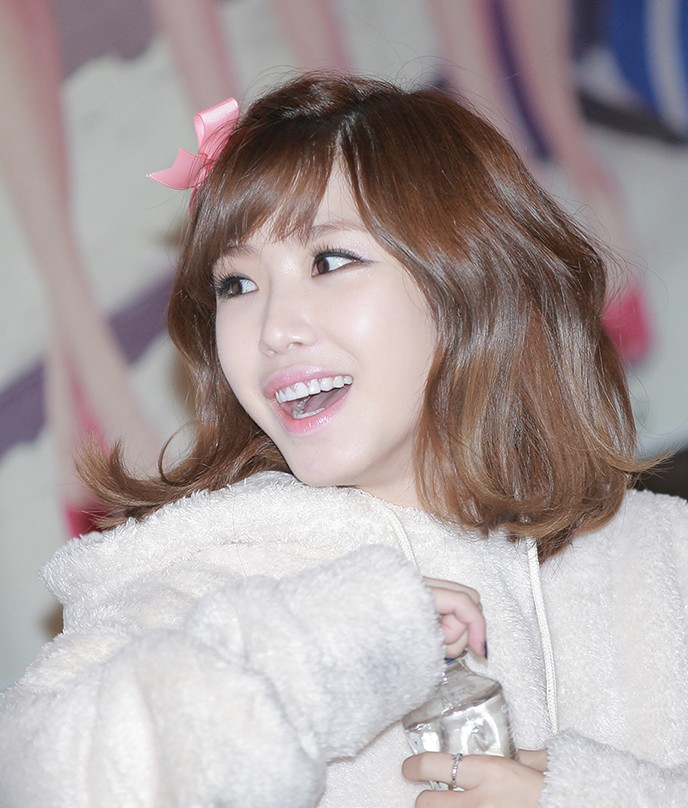
Hyoseong at a fansigning event in 2014

At the beginning of 2014, Hyoseong acted as Han Na-young in her first drama, The Ghost-Seeing Detective Cheo Yong, alongside Oh Ji-ho and Oh Ji-eun, receiving praises for her performance.

On May 12, 2014, she released her solo debut album Top Secret, holding a showcase at the Ramada Hotel Club Vanguard on the same day. A month later, she was cast in KBS1 daily drama My Dear Cat.

Hyoseong released her first extended play titled Fantasia on May 7, 2015. She took part in writing lyrics for the album on two songs. In the same year, Hyoseong reprised her role as Han Na-young in the second season of The Ghost-Seeing Detective Cheo Yong.

On March 28, 2016, Hyoseong released her second extended play titled Colored. Find Me was promoted as the lead single and featured TS Entertainment labelmate D.Action from the hip-hop duo Untouchable. Hyoseong co-wrote the lead single while also writing lyrics for other songs on the album such as Dear Moon.

In May 2016, she was cast as Park Bo-yeon in the thriller drama, Wanted. Hyoseong's work on the drama earned her the Special Acting Award – Actress in a Genre Drama at the 2016 SBS Drama Awards.

In October 2016, it was announced that Hyoseong would be replacing Cao Lu as one of the hosts on the talk show Video Star.

In 2017, Hyoseong was cast as Kim Gyori on the tvN drama Introverted Boss. Hyoseong expressed her difficulty with this role in an interview with BNT International stating, "It was frustrating. I'm not the type to keep things to myself, but Gyori was the opposite. I think a lot and can be shy, but I am extroverted to the extent that I express what I want to say. The director allowed us to ad-lib some parts, and it was hard at times to keep my real outgoing personality from coming out."

=== 2018–present: Agency transitions and continued activities ===
Following her legal dispute with TS Entertainment , Jun signed with Tommy & Partners Entertainment in 2018 after her contract with the agency was declared invalid by the Seoul Western District Court. In November 2019, Jun established the independent one-person label JHS Entertainment to manage her solo activities. In 2021, she joined IOK Company. She later moved to Alien Company before signing with MAJOR9 and RBW (Rainbowbridge World) in 2026.

In May 2026, Jun signed an exclusive contract with the entertainment agency MAJOR9 to manage her individual activities as both a solo singer and actress. In June 2026, it was announced that Secret would make a comeback under RBW, marking their first group promotion in approximately 12 years. The project featured Jun Hyo-seong as the group’s leader, alongside Jung Ha-na and new member Yebin, who is significantly younger than the existing members, forming a reorganized three-member lineup. Song Ji-eun and Han Sun-hwa were not part of the 2026 group activities. The group released the special mini album Secret Flavor and resumed promotional activities, including reinterpreted versions of their earlier works.

== Legal dispute with TS Entertainment ==
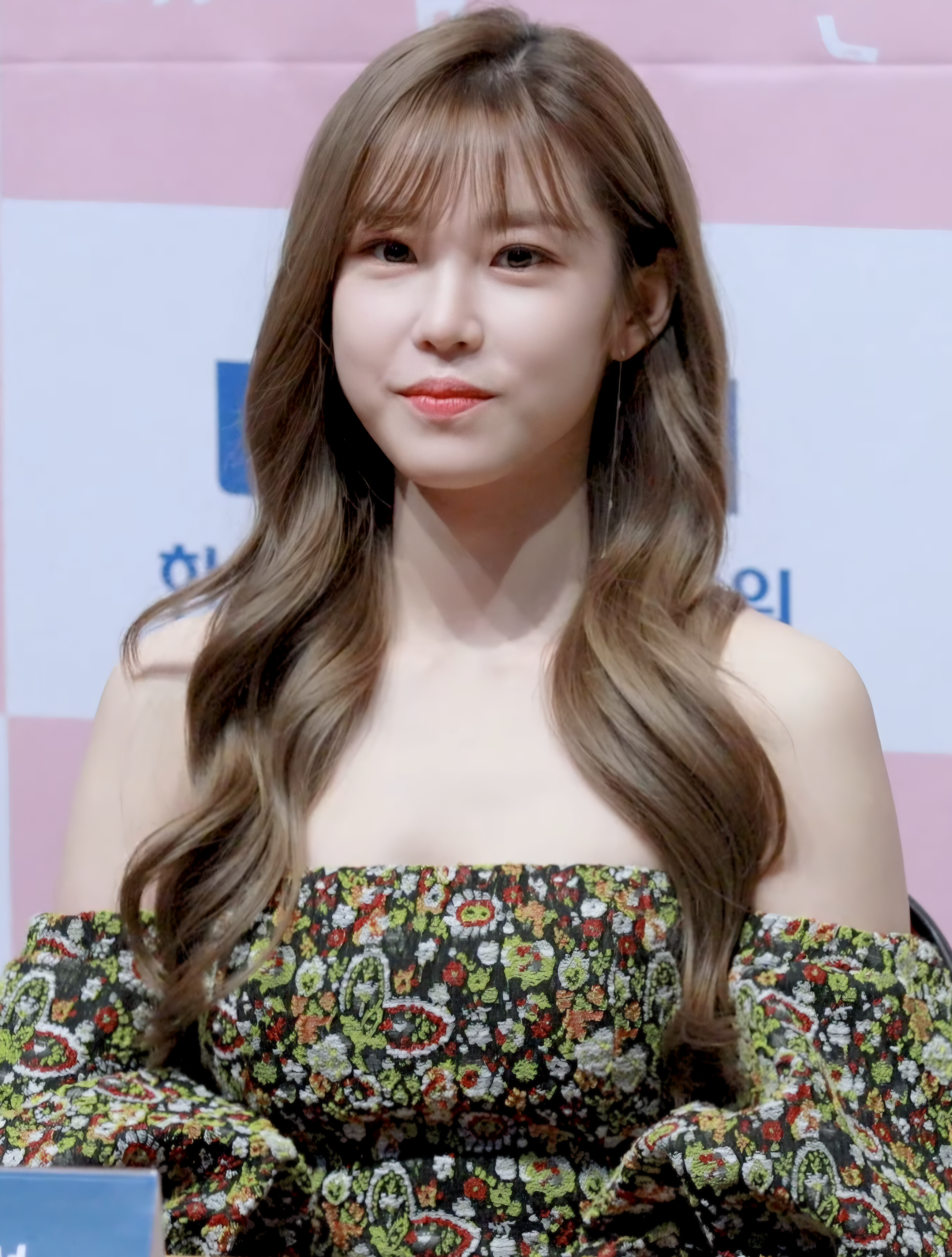
Jun at Green to My Heart press conference in 2019

On February 28, 2018, it was reported that Hyoseong was in legal disputes with her agency TS Entertainment due to issues with not receiving payments. On March 5, Hyoseong's lawyer revealed that she had filed a civil lawsuit in September 2017 to confirm that her contract with the agency was no longer valid. Aside for the unreceived payments, her lawyer cited a transfer of the management rights conferred by her exclusive contract to another party without her consent. Her lawyer also stated that it would be unlikely of Hyoseong to remain a member of Secret while under TS Entertainment due to the lack of trust and communication between the agency and the singer.

On October 29, it was announced that she would return to the entertainment industry after signing with Tommy & Partners Entertainment. On November 14, the Seoul Western District Court ruled in Hyoseong's favor, confirming the invalidity of her contract with TS Entertainment and condemning the agency to pay her approximately 130 million won (approximately $114,840) in remaining down payments and unpaid wages.

== Incidents ==
On December 11, 2012, Secret was involved in a traffic accident around 2:00 am when the van they were riding in hit an ice patch on the highway, which caused it to slide and veer off the road hitting the guardrail and flipping over. Hyoseong suffered minor injuries and had a cast put on a previously injured knee, while fellow Secret member Zinger broke her ribs. Following the accident, Secret went into hiatus, stopping their "Talk That" song promotions.

During an appearance on SBS's TV show Strong Heart on January 22, 2013, Secret member Song Ji-eun explained how Hyoseong saved her life during the accident. She said:

Last year, after finishing our recording for Star King and heading home, our car was in an accident that caused it to flip over on the road. It hit a guard rail and dropped five meters below it. I was knocked out for a moment and woke up to the sound of the members calling my name. I found my lower body in the car but my upper half sticking out of a broken window. I was basically hanging upside down. There were glass shards right in front of my eyes and I knew I could have suffered a big injury if I was dropped. I started crying the minute I saw all of the glass. Then Hyoseong told me to stop crying and stay awake. When she asked where I was, I could hear their shock as I said that I was hanging outside. Hyoseong then said that she'll take me out. I felt someone grab my foot and felt Hyoseong use her leg to support the rest of my body. She had not yet recovered from a leg injury from last year and yet she still used her leg to hold me up. Hyoseong ended up injuring her leg again because of me.

== Public image ==
Hyoseong gained increased public attention after being selected as a model for the lingerie brand Yes (예스), with the campaign receiving significant media coverage. Promotional materials and media reports frequently highlighted her youthful image and physique, and she became associated with the Korean “bagel girl” (베이글녀) image, a term referring to a person with a youthful face and a curvaceous body.

She also attracted attention for her stage performances as a member of Secret, with entertainment media frequently noting her stage outfits and performance presence during promotional activities. Coverage of the group’s performances often emphasized her visual presentation alongside choreography and stage styling.

In a 2016 interview, Hyoseong stated that public perception of her had largely focused on her physical appearance, while her vocal abilities had received comparatively less attention. She expressed a desire to shift emphasis toward her singing ability rather than her figure, and said that she intended to gradually showcase her musical and vocal strengths through her solo activities.

According to The Korea Times, Hyoseong later reflected that attention focused on her physical appearance could be mentally taxing. She noted that her image had often been overemphasized compared to other aspects of her abilities, and expressed a desire to be recognized as both a “hot and talented” entertainer.

== Personal life ==
Hyoseong is the middle child out of three sisters. According to Hyoseong, her two sisters were born at home while she was born at a hospital. Since they were young, her family struggled financially and they worked together making newspaper deliveries. Her father was a construction worker.

== Controversies ==
=== Misuse of the word 'democratization' ===
During the May 14, 2013 broadcast of SBS Power FM's Choi Hwajung's Power Time, the four members of Secret participated in a game in which they were given two options and each member would say which one they preferred. The game was done in order to test the members' teamwork and see if they would agree on one thing and have the same set of answers. With the several pairs of choices given, the members of Secret were able to agree three times. After the MC declared this, Hyoseong then made a remark, stating:

저희는 개성을 존중하는 팀이거든요. 민주화시키지 않아요. (You see, we are a team that respects individuality. We don't force democratization.)

The term "Minjuhwa (민주화)", translated as democratization, defined as the transition from an authoritarian regime to a more democratic political regime, has been used by the conservative Ilbe online community as a slang term meaning 'the citizens create chaos', 'to destroy', or 'to oppress'. In response to this, netizens began claiming that Hyoseong has used the term "democratization" in a negative manner. Both TS Entertainment and Hyoseong apologized for using the word without knowing its meaning on Ilbe.

The controversy did not subside immediately, netizens pointed out this was not merely a personal issue for Hyoseong, but rather a reflection of the flawed historical awareness of the younger generation. Media outlets similarly condemned the blunder, framing it as a demonstration of extreme carelessness and a lack of basic knowledge among young celebrities who blindly parroted internet trends without research.

On May 20, 2013, Hyoseong issued another formal apology, explaining she had accidentally adopted the slang while monitoring online boards to check fan reactions. Seeing her own name attached to the phrase "democratized by Jun Hyoseong," she had mistakenly assumed it was a positive trending phrase meaning "to recommend something you like." Following the incident, the group’s public appearances were limited for a while, as several universities cancelled their scheduled festival performances citing student complaints against Hyoseong. She subsequently studied for and passed the official Korean History Proficiency Test.

=== Campaign appearance and public reaction ===
In 2021, Jun Hyo-seong appeared in a campaign video produced by the Ministry of Gender Equality and Family addressing perceptions of dating violence as part of a public awareness campaign. In the video, she stated that she often felt concern about personal safety when returning home at night and emphasized the importance of a society where individuals can live freely without fear of violence.

Following the release of the campaign, the video received mixed public reactions online. Some users defended the campaign, emphasizing its focus on dating violence prevention and broader public safety concerns. Others criticized its framing, arguing in online communities that South Korea has relatively strong public safety conditions and that violence in public spaces can affect men as well, as well as referencing unrelated violent crime cases raised in discussion. These critics therefore questioned the framing of the campaign’s message. Some critics commented that the introduction of the term "gender-based violence" (gendeo-pokryeok) functioned as ideological rhetoric that framed men as potent criminals and default oppressors, and women as exclusive victims, thereby shifting the public debate from a universal message of safety into a polarized gender conflict.

The campaign also drew organized public criticism from the men’s rights group Shin Namnyeon Yeondae (신남성연대), which held a street demonstration opposing the Ministry of Gender Equality and Family. During the protest, the group used an image of Jun Hyo-seong from an episode of Saturday Night Live Korea in which she appeared in a cosplay costume exposing part of her chest and cleavage, displaying it on large banners and displays alongside slogans including “응, 누난 페미코인 못 타” (“You can’t ride the feminism coin”).

Media reports also noted that Jun had previously been active in entertainment under a “sexy concept” image highlighting her figure, which was also described in Korean media and online discourse as a “bagel girl” (베이글녀) image, and that criticism emerged online questioning the contrast between her earlier public image and her participation in the campaign. In addition, online discussions surrounding the campaign escalated into broader protest, with some users calling for the video’s removal.

Following the controversy, Jun temporarily stepped down from hosting her radio program schedule during the same period; however, her agency stated that the absence was due to scheduling reasons.

== Artistry and influences ==
Hyoseong has said that she was influenced by pop and R&B groups such as Fin.K.L and SES. She was also influenced by South Korean ballad singers such as Kim Bum-soo, Sung Si-kyung and Kim Yeon-woo. When it came to dancing, Hyoseong said that she was influenced by the American singer Beyoncé particularly. She also stated that Beyoncé is one of her music idols.

== Endorsements ==
Along with Han Sun-hwa, Kim Himchan and Bang Yongguk, Hyoseong was chosen as a model for Kellan sportswear 11/12 Winter Collection in September 2011. Hyoseong was an active endorser of the lingerie 'Yes' since being chosen as the brand model on January 29, 2013. In 2014, Hyoseong was chosen as the model of smartphone game Hero's Star. In 2016, Hyoseong was chosen as the model of a male cosmetic brand Swagger.

== Discography ==
=== Extended plays ===
Title	Album details	Peak positions	Sales
Title	Album details	KOR	Sales
Fantasia	Released: May 7, 2015; Label: TS Entertainment; Format: CD, digital download	4	KOR: 16,086+
Colored	Released: Mar 28, 2016; Label: TS Entertainment; Format: CD, digital download	7	KOR: 6,364+
"—" denotes releases that did not chart or were not released in that region.

=== Single albums ===
Title	Album details	Peak positions	Sales
Title	Album details	KOR	Sales
Top Secret	Released: May 12, 2014; Label: TS Entertainment; Format: CD, digital download	2	KOR: 11,067+
"—" denotes releases that did not chart or were not released in that region.

=== Singles ===
Year	Title	Peak chart positions		Sales (DL)	Album
Year	Title	KOR Gaon	KOR Billboard	Sales (DL)	Album
2014	"Good-night Kiss"	9	14	KOR: 716,489+	Top Secret
2015	"Into You" (반해)	22	—	KOR: 173,604+	Fantasia
2016	"Find Me (feat. D.Action)" (나를 찾아줘)	75	—	KOR: 35,536+	Colored
2019	"Starlight"	—	—	—N/a	non-album single
"—" denotes releases that did not chart or were not released in that region.

=== Collaborations ===
Year	Title	Peak chart positions		Sales	Album
Year	Title	KOR Gaon	KOR Billboard	Sales	Album
2009	"My Boo" Untouchable feat. Jun Hyoseong & Han Sunhwa)	—	—		Untouchable: First Mini Album
2012	"이사람 (This Person)" (Nicole, Hyolyn, Hyoseong, Hyuna & Nana)	2	—	KOR: 95,865+	SBS Gayo Daejun The Color of K- Pop – Dazzling RED
2014	"칵테일 사랑 (Cocktail Love)" (Hyoseong, Jieun & Daehyeon)	—	—		Music Tour Yesterday: Episode 6
"—" denotes releases that did not chart or were not released in that region.

=== Soundtrack appearances ===
Year	Title	Drama
2017	"Dangerous"	Ms. Perfect
2019	"항상 나를 (Always me)"	Green to My Heart

== Filmography ==
=== Television series ===
Year	Title	Role	Notes	Ref.
2012	Salamander Guru and The Shadows	Soo-yeon	Cameo (Episode 4)	
2014	Cheo Yong	Han Na-young		
2014	My Dear Cat	Han Soo-ri		
2015	Cheo Yong 2	Han Na-young		
2016	Wanted	Park Bo-yeon		
2017	Introverted Boss	Kim Gyori		
2020	Memorist	Kang Ji-eun		
2023	Delivery Man	Go Se-ra	Cameo	

=== Web series ===
Year	Title	Role	Ref.
2019	The Pure Memories of My Heart	Han Seo-rin	
2023	Celebrity	Oh Min-hye	

=== Television shows ===
Year	Title	Role	Notes	Ref.
2005	Battle Shinhwa	Contestant	Finalist, Top 6	
2007	Diary of Five Girls	Cast Member	With Five Girls	
2009	Secret Story	Regular cast		
2009	Sonyeon Sonyeo Gayo Baekso	MC		
2009	Gom TV Music Chart (GMC)	MC		
2010	Bouquet	Regular cast		
2011	Oh! My School	Regular cast		
2011	The Show	MC	Season 1 – Pairing with Luna of f(x)	
2015	Law of the Jungle: Hidden Kingdom Special in Brunei	Cast member		
2015	Saturday Night Live Korea	Host	Episode 123	
2015	Beauty Bible 2015 Spring/Summer	presenter	Factual shows	
2015	Duet Song Festival	Singer	Chuseok Special Pilot	
2016	Real Men: Female Special	Cast Member	Season 4 (episode 146–153)	
2016	Duet Song Festival	Singer	Episode 5	
2016–2018	Video Star	Host	Permanent cast member	
2019	Beauty Room	Host	Permanent cast member	
2019	King of Mask Singer	Contestant	Episodes 201–202 – As "A Chocolate Factory"	
2020	Things These Days	Host	with Yubin and Berry Good's Johyun	
2021	I'm SOLO	Host	Season 1–2	

=== Radio shows ===
Year	Title	Role	Notes	Ref.
2022	Coexistence Diary 3	DJ	July 11	

=== Hosting ===
Year	Title	Role	Notes	Ref.
2021	23rd Bucheon International Animation Festival	MC of the opening ceremony	with Bae Sung-jae	

== Ambassadorship ==
Year	Title	Ref.
2021	Public relations ambassador for hanbok 2021	

== Accolades ==
=== Awards and nominations ===
Name of the award ceremony, year presented, category, nominee of the award, and the result of the nomination
Award ceremony	Year	Category	Nominee / Work	Result	Ref.
Korea Arts and Culture Awards	2021	Beauty Icon Award	Jun Hyo-seong	Won	
Korea Arts and Culture Awards	2023	Grand Prize (Daesang) – Broadcast Performer / Actor	Jun Hyo-seong	Won	
Korea Drama Awards	2014	Best New Actress	My Dear Cat	Nominated	
Korea First Brand Awards	2017	Most Anticipated Female Entertainer (2018)	Jun Hyo-seong	Won	
MBC Entertainment Awards	2020	Rookie Award – Radio Category	FM4U	Won	
Mnet Asian Music Awards	2016	Best Dance Performance Solo	Find Me	Nominated	
Mnet Asian Music Awards	2016	Song of the Year	Find Me	Nominated	
SBS Drama Awards	2016	Special Acting Award – Actress in a Genre Drama	Wanted	Won	
Seoul International Webfest	2020	Best Actress	The Pure Memories of My Heart	Won	
World Star Entertainment Awards	2019	Excellence Award, Singer	Jun Hyo-seong	Won	

=== Honors ===
Name of country and organization, year given, and name of honor or award
Country	Organization	Year	Honor or Award	Ref.
South Korea	Ministry of Culture, Sports and Tourism	2021	Spring Hanbok Love Appreciation Certificate Award	
