= Jung Ha-na =

South Korean singer and television personality

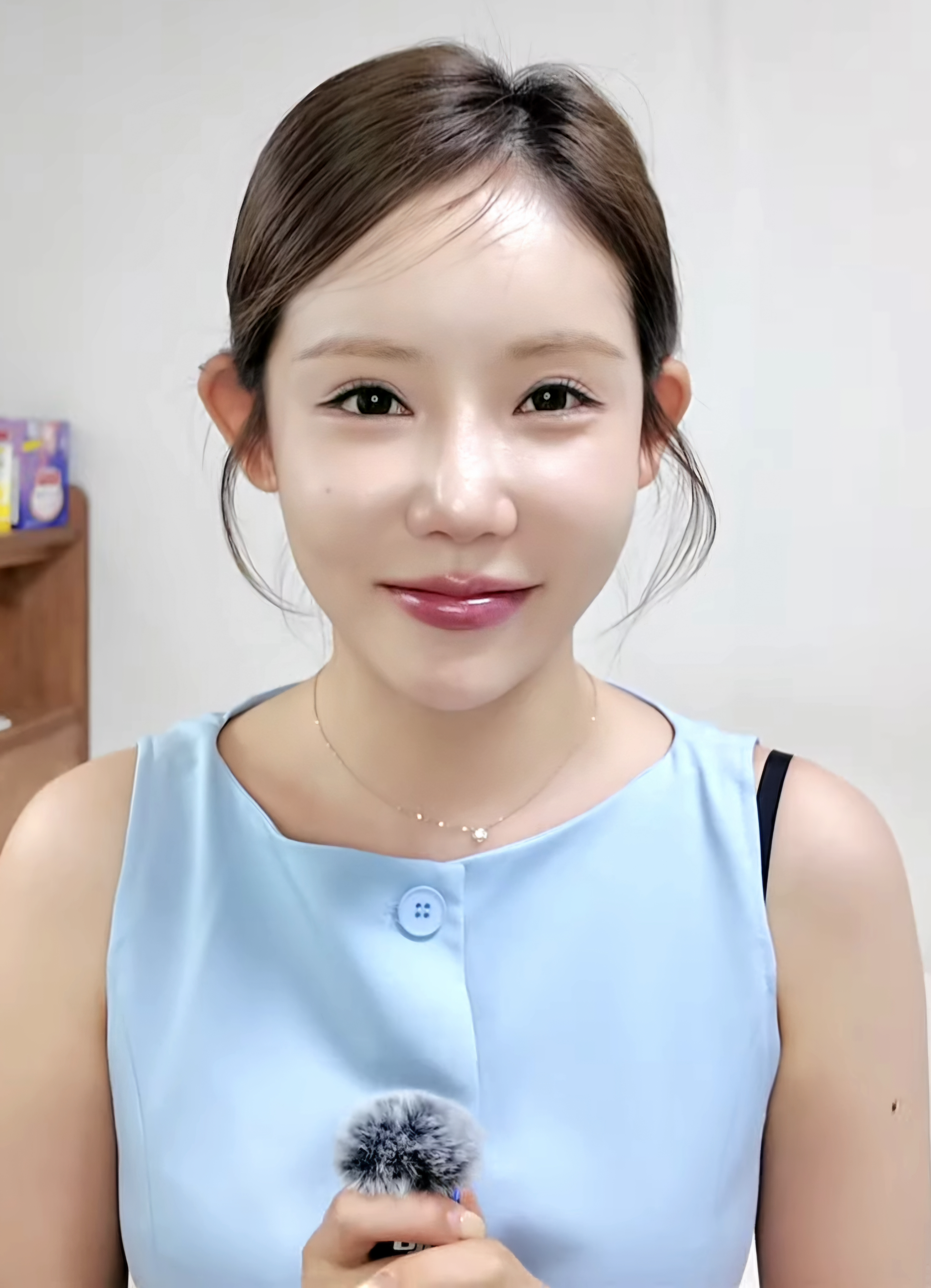
- Jung in July 2024
- Born: 2 February 1990 (age 36); Uijeongbu, Gyeonggi, South Korea
- Other name: Zinger
- Occupations: Singer; television personality; Youtuber
- Musical career
- Genre: K-pop
- Instrument: Vocals
- Years active: 2008–2016; 2023–present
- Labels: RBW; TS
- Member of: Secret

Korean name
- Hangul: 정하나
- RR: Jeong Hana
- MR: Chŏng Hana

Jung Ha-na (Korean: 정하나; born 2 February 1990), better known by her former stage name Zinger and mononymously as Hana, is a South Korean singer, television personality, and YouTuber. She is best known for being a member of the South Korean girl group Secret.

== Early life ==
Jung Ha-na was born in Uijeongbu, Gyeonggi, South Korea on 2 February 1990. Her mother worked as a singer in the 1980s and her father worked as a bodyguard.

== Career ==
=== 2008–2014: Secret and rising popularity ===
In September 2009, TS Entertainment announced that they will be debuting a four-member girl group in October 2009. Jung debuted with the stage name of Zinger, along with Han Sunhwa, Song Jieun and Jun Hyoseong, as the group, Secret. Prior to their debut, the group was on a documentary show called Secret Story which chronicled their debut process. They released their debut single "I Want You Back" in October 2009.

In April 2010, Secret released their first mini-album titled Secret Time which spawned them the hit single "Magic" and served as their breakthrough song in South Korea. In August 2010, they released their second mini-album titled Madonna and the title track continued their success as it topped the Gaon Single Charts.

In January 2011, the group deviated from their "sexy" and "sassy" image and released "Shy Boy", a "cutesy" and retro-inspired song. Although they were worried with the 180-degree image transformation, the single exceeded their expectations as the song was a major success. "Shy Boy" charted strongly in digital charts and Secret won their first trophy on music shows with the song. They won a total of five trophies in various music shows with "Shy Boy". Secret continued their success with the release of their second CD single titled "Starlight Moonlight". The title track became another hit for Secret as the song reached number one on the Gaon Monthly Singles Charts and won them another trophy in SBS's Inkigayo.

Jung in 2015

The same year Secret began a foray of Japanese activities with the release of "Madonna" and Shy Boy. The Japanese remake of "Madonna" debuted at number nine in the Oricon singles charts. Secret was one of the first three Korean girl groups to debut on the Oricon chart in the top 10, the others being Kara and Girls Generation being the first and second respectively. In October 2011, they released their first studio album titled Moving in Secret, which spawned them another hit with the lead single "Love is Move". Jung also participated in the production of Moving in Secret by writing most of the rap parts in their songs and the album featured a solo track for Jung titled "Amazinger". Secret released their first mini-album in Japan titled Shy Boy. The mini-album debuted also at number nine on the Oricon album charts.

In February 2012, Secret released their second CD single in Japan titled "So Much For Goodbye".

Starting from promotions for Secret's single "YooHoo" from their album Letter from Secret released 30 April 2013, Jung began officially promoting under her real name, Jung Ha-na.

In August 2014, the group released the EP Secret Summer, which was their final release prior to their hiatus.

=== 2015–2021: Internal discord allegations ===
In 2015, during a variety-show discussion about the four Secret members' drinking habits, Jung described Han Sun-hwa as being "dissatisfied with the world and prone to grumbling." Han subsequently responded on Twitter, stating that what had been characterized as complaints were instead instances in which she had sought advice and support from Jung and other members, and that she felt burdened by maintaining an agency-imposed variety-show persona that did not reflect her actual personality. Han added that Jung’s remarks were made without full context and that she responded publicly on Twitter to address potential misunderstandings. Group leader Jun Hyo-seong later stated that Han's remarks had been misunderstood and were not intended as criticism toward Jung. However, Han publicly disputed Jun's explanation, which led to renewed attention to her earlier statements about agency-imposed image expectations and her having sought advice and support from fellow members over an extended period. TS Entertainment denied that there was internal discord, stating that the matter was not significant. Following that, Han left Secret and TS Entertainment in 2016.

The agency later became involved in multiple legal disputes with its artists, including Jun Hyo-seong and Song Ji-eun, who subsequently left the agency in 2018 following the disputes. Some media reports and commentary later revisited the incident, with commentators suggesting that it reflected broader concerns about TS Entertainment’s abusive management practices and that Han’s statements had not been fully taken into account by Jung and other members at the time. TS Entertainment later ceased operations in 2021, with Jung being the last member of Secret to leave the agency.

=== 2022–present: Career hiatus and recent activities ===
After Secret's activities became inactive, Jung took a hiatus from music activities. In August 2022, she signed an exclusive contract with entertainment agency Uzurocks to manage her activities. She did not release any official solo songs, albums, or other music projects, instead focusing on YouTube and variety show appearances.

Jung started her YouTube channel '정하나 ZINGER' and started posting beauty creator content. However, she later said that her YouTube activities were unsuccessful and difficult to sustain due to inconsistent income. In 2025, she appeared on Sixth Sense: City Tour, where she discussed her career uncertainty and revealed that she was considering opening a kimchi-jjigae restaurant as a means of livelihood.

In June 2026, it was announced that Secret would make a comeback under RBW, marking their first group promotion in approximately 12 years. The project featured Jun Hyo-seong as the group’s leader, alongside Jung and new member Yebin, who is significantly younger than the existing members, forming a reorganized three-member lineup. Song Ji-eun and Han Sun-hwa were not part of the 2026 group activities. The group released the special mini album Secret Flavor and resumed promotional activities, including reinterpreted versions of their earlier works.

== Van accident involving Secret members ==
On 11 December 2012 at 2am, Jung was involved in a traffic accident with the other Secret members, breaking her ribs and bruising one of her lungs. A van that had been carrying her and the other members slipped off the road and turned over on itself. The incident was followed by harsh Tweets directed only at Jung. She tweeted on the 13th,

"After collecting my mind and reading the news, I started looking at all the comments. [The replies are too much.] I'm asking you to think about whether you could post those words if it was your family member or someone you love who was in the same position. Though my body and strength are weak, it's getting hard for my heart too."

In a 2017 interview, Jung stated that she felt the stage name “Zinger” represented a “fabricated image” and that she believed she was perceived as a “manufactured person” following negative online comments after the van accident, including remarks referencing disparities in popularity within the group and her standing within. She added that, after considerable deliberation, she decided to promote under her real name, Jung Ha-na, describing it as a significant decision comparable to starting over as a rookie.

== Personal life ==
Jung is an only child. Her mother was a singer who had passed the TBS Talent Exam and released a single in South Korea. Her father is a martial artist and was a presidential bodyguard. She is also friends with 2NE1's CL and Wonder Girls' Sunye while attending the same dance academy in middle school.

== Discography ==
=== Soundtrack appearances and solo performances ===
Year	Album	Song	Artist
2011	Moving in Secret	Amazinger	Hana's solo

== Filmography ==
=== Television dramas ===
Year	Title	Role
2015	Jumping Girl	Lee Yenny

=== Variety shows ===
Year	Title	Role	Notes
2009	Secret Story	Herself	Regular cast
2010	Boquet	Herself	Regular cast
2019	King of Mask Singer	Contestant (MBC)	

=== Hosting ===
Year	Title	Notes
2010	M Countdown	with Secret
2012	Show! Music Core	with Han Sun-hwa
