= Shy Boy (disambiguation) =

"Shy Boy" is a 1982 song by Banarama. It may also refer to:

- Shy Boy (Katie Melua song)
- Shy Boy (Secret song)
- "Shy Boy", a song by Carly Rae Jepsen from the 2023 album The Loveliest Time
- "Shy Boy", a song by Jordin Sparks from the 2007 album Jordin Sparks
- Shy Boy (EP), by Secret
- "Shyboy", a song by Billy Sheehan from David Lee Roth's 1986 album Eat 'Em and Smile
