= Welcome to Secret Time =

Studio album by Secret
- Released: August 22, 2012
- Recorded: 2011–2012
- Genre: K-pop; dance-pop
- Label: Sony Music
- Producer: Kim Taesung

Secret chronology
Shy Boy (2011)	Welcome to Secret Time (2012)	Poison (2012)

Singles from Welcome to Secret Time
- 1. "Madonna" Released: August 3, 2011; 2. "So Much for Goodbye" Released: February 29, 2012; 3. "Twinkle Twinkle" Released: June 20, 2012; 4. "Love Is Move" Released: August 22, 2012

Professional ratings
Review scores
Source	Rating
Rolling Stone Japan	3.5/5 stars

Welcome to Secret Time (often stylized as Welcome to SECRET Time) is the second studio album (first Japanese release) by South Korean girl group Secret. The album was released on August 22, 2012, by Sony Music Entertainment Japan.

== Background and release ==
In August 2011, Secret made their official debut in Japan with the release of the Japanese version of their Korean hit, "Madonna". In November 2011, they released their first mini-album in the country with Shy Boy. It was then followed by two original Japanese singles entitled "So Much for Goodbye" and "Twinkle Twinkle". On June 24, 2012 TS Entertainment officials confirmed, "SECRET will be releasing their first album with "Love is Move" as their title track in Japan next month. This will mark the beginning of their official activities." They continued, "The album contains not only "Love is Move", but a number of their Korean hits along with brand new tracks. The girls will be leaving for Japan in the beginning of August and spend a month promoting in both Korea and Japan."

Welcome to Secret Time was released on August 22, 2012. The Japanese version of "Love is Move", dubbed as "Ai wa Move", serves as the lead single. It also included the group's Korean releases "Madonna" and "Shy Boy," a Japanese version of "Starlight Moonlight," and their Japanese original singles "So Much for Goodbye" and "Twinkle Twinkle."

== Singles ==
=== "Madonna" ===
On June 14, 2011, Secret released the Japanese music video of "Madonna" The Japanese version of the song was released in Japan on August 3, 2011, on the CD single, Madonna. The single also included a B-side, "My Boy". On August 10, the group performed the song on the popular Japanese music program, Coming Soon!! The single ranked 9th on Oricon's weekly singles chart of August 10, with sales of 13,124 copies. "Madonna" sold over 20,000 copies in Japan.

=== "So Much for Goodbye" ===
"So Much for Goodbye" (これくらいのサヨナラ, Kore Kurai no Sayonara) was released as a CD single on February 29, 2012 through Sony Music Associated Records. The CD single contains three tracks namely "So Much for Goodbye", "Love Is a Long Run" (恋はロング・ラン, Koi wa Long Run) and "Color of Love". "So Much for Goodbye" was produced by Im Sanghyuk and Jeon Daun, the same composers of "Don't Laugh" from the album Moving in Secret. The Japanese lyrics were written by Junji Ishiwatari. Secret stated through their official Japanese website, "'So Much for Goodbye' is a ballad song accompanied with a beautiful piano, guitar and string instrument arrangement." The group embarked on their first promotional tour in Japan named "Secret 1st Japan Tour", held in March 2012 in support of the single.

The single peaked at number 14 and 17 on Oricon's daily and weekly singles charts respectively, selling 9,656 copies in two weeks. "So Much for Goodbye" also charted at number 55 on Billboard's Japan Hot 100.

=== "Twinkle Twinkle" ===
"Twinkle Twinkle" was released as a CD single on June 13, 2012 through Sony Music Associated Records. It also includes the B-side track, "First Kiss". An anime version of "Twinkle Twinkle" was used as the ending theme song of the Naruto spin-off, "Naruto SD: Rock Lee and his Ninja Pals" aired on TV Tokyo. Sony Music Japan released the official music video of "Twinkle Twinkle" on May 11.

The single peaked at number 11 and 16 on Oricon's daily and weekly singles charts respectively, selling 8,022 copies in four weeks. "Twinkle Twinkle" also charted at number 63 on the Japan Hot 100. Rolling Stone Japan rated the single two out of five stars.

=== "Love Is Move" ===
The Japanese version of "Love Is Move" is the album's lead single. "Love Is Move" is an uptempo song, composed in a contemporary pop style. The song is also retro-inspired, with influences from 1930s swing music. The song's concept was inspired by the 1930s cartoon character Betty Boop. Kang Ji Won and Kim Ki Bum both produced and wrote the song's lyrics and melody, while Kang Ji Won arranged the track.

== Track listing ==
The album was released in 3 different versions: Limited Edition A (CD+DVD), Limited Edition B (CD+DVD), and Regular Edition (CD-Only). The DVD for Limited Edition A features the Zepp Tokyo performance of the girls' first Japan tour, 1st Japan Tour Secret Time 2012. Meanwhile, Limited Edition B comes with a DVD containing 5 music videos and their making-of footage.

=== Standard Edition ===
Tracklist
No.	Title	Lyrics	Music	Arrangement	Length
1.	"Intro: Welcome to Secret Time"	Zinger			1:21
2.	"Ai wa Move" (愛はムーブ; Love Is Move) (Japanese version)	Kang Jiwon, Kim Kibum, Junji Ishiwatari (Japanese lyrics)	Kang Jiwon, Kim Kibum	Kang Jiwon	3:19
3.	"Madonna" (Japanese – Album version)	Kang Jiwon	Kang Jiwon, Kim Kibum	Kang Jiwon, Kim Kibum	3:41
4.	"Shy Boy" (Japanese version)	Kang Jiwon, Kim Kibum, Junji Ishiwatari (Japanese lyrics)	Kang Jiwon, Kim Kibum	Kang Jiwon	3:39
5.	"Starlight Moonlight" (Japanese version)	Kang Jiwon, Kim Kibum, Junji Ishiwatari (Japanese lyrics)	Kang Jiwon, Kim Kibum	Kang Jiwon, Kim Kibum	3:53
6.	"Manatsu no Mermaid" (真夏のマーメイド; Mid-Summer Mermaid)	Junju Ishiwatari	Shinji Moroi, Mary, JUNKOO		3:50
7.	"I Miss You"	Park Soo Suk, INOO, Junji Ishiwatari	Park Soo Suk		3:56
8.	"So Much for Goodbye" (これくらいのサヨナラ; Kore Kurai no Sayonara)	Junji Ishiwatari	Im Sanghyuk and Jeon Daun	Im Sanghyuk and Jeon Daun	3:43
9.	"Don't Laugh" (New Groove Version – 笑わないで; Warawanaide)	Im Sanghyuk, Jeon Daun, Zinger	Im Sanghyuk, Jeon Daun	Im Sanghyuk, Jeon Daun	3:43
10.	"Twinkle Twinkle"	Junji Ishiwatari	Hans.W		3:20
11.	"Drive to You"	INOO, Junji Ishiwatari (Japanese lyrics)	Park Soo Suk		3:32
12.	"Walking"	Junji Ishiwatari, Ricky	Ricky		4:07
13.	"Secret Dream"	Junji Ishiwatari	Okoon		4:01
Total length:					48:13

=== Limited Edition A ===
Limited Edition A contains the Standard Edition CD and the DVD contains the Zepp Tokyo performance of the girls’ first Japan tour, Secret 1st Japan Tour (16 tracks).

DVD – Type A: 1st Japan Tour "Secret Time" 2012 at Zepp Tokyo
No.	Title	Length
1.	"Opening"
2.	"Magic"
3.	"Movie Star" (Japanese version)
4.	"Be Sexy" (섹시하게; Sexyhage)
5.	"Love is Move"
6.	"Together" (Japanese version)
7.	"My Boy" (New Arrange version)
8.	"Shy Boy" (Japanese version)
9.	"Oh! Honey"
10.	"Warawanaide" (Don't Laugh – Japanese version)
11.	"La La La" (Japanese version)
12.	"I Wish"
13.	"Kore Kurai no Sayonara"
14.	"Color of Love"
15.	"Madonna" (Japanese version)
16.	"Starlight Moonlight" (Japanese version) (Encore)
17.	"Koi wa Long Run" (Encore)

=== Limited Edition B ===
Limited Edition B contains the Standard Edition CD and the DVD contains 5 music videos and their making-of footage. Music Videos for "Madonna," "Shy Boy," "So Much For Goodbye," "Twinkle Twinkle" and album's title track "Love Is Move" + making of "Love Is Move".

DVD – Type B: Music videos
No.	Title	Length
1.	"Ai wa Move" (Music video – Japanese version)
2.	"Madonna" (Music video – Japanese version)
3.	"Shy Boy" (Music video – Japanese version)
4.	"Kure Kurai no Sayonara" (Music video)
5.	"Twinkle Twinkle" (Music video)
6.	"Ai wa Move" (Music video – Making-of)

== Charts ==
=== Oricon ===
Oricon Chart	Peak	Debut Sales	Sales Total	Chart Run
Daily Albums Chart	6	—	10,992	2 weeks
Weekly Albums Chart	11	9,437	10,992	2 weeks
Monthly Albums Chart	36	10,992	10,992	2 weeks

=== Other Charts ===
Chart	Peak Position
Billboard Japan Top Albums	11

== Credits and personnel ==
These credits were adapted from the Welcome to Secret Time liner notes.

- Kim Tae-sung – executive producer co-producing
- Song Jieun – vocals
- Han Sunhwa – vocals
- Jun Hyoseong – vocals
- Jung Hana – vocals

== Release history ==
Country	Date	Format	Label
Worldwide	August 22, 2012	Digital download	Sony Music Associated Records
Japan	August 22, 2012	CD, Digital download	Sony Music Associated Records
