= Talk That =

Talk That may refer to:

- "Talk That" (Timbaland song)
- "Talk That" (Secret song), 2012
