= Secret Summer =

EP by Secret
- Released: August 11, 2014
- Recorded: 2012
- Genre: K-pop
- Length: 17:24
- Label: TS
- Producer: Duble Sidekick

Secret chronology
Letter from Secret (2013)	Secret Summer (2014)	Secret Flavor (2026)

Singles from Secret Summer
- 1. "I'm in Love" Released: August 11, 2014

Secret Summer is the sixth extended play (promoted as fifth Korean-language EP) by South Korean girl group Secret. The album was released on August 11, 2014, and contains six tracks. The album came in 2 versions, one pink and one blue.

This was Secret's final album before their disbandment in 2018, as well as their last to feature members Jieun and Sunhwa. The group eventually returned in 2026 with their seventh extended play Secret Flavor and a new member lineup.

== Release and promotion ==
The lead single, "I'm in Love", was released on August 11, 2014. The official music video was unveiled on the same day. The song was written and produced by Duble Sidekick, and marked a return to their sexy and powerful inspired songs such as "Magic", "Madonna", "Love Is Move" and "Poison".

Secret promoted "I'm in Love" as well as "U R Fired" and "Could Do Better" on music shows in August 2014 on KBS's Music Bank, MBC's Show! Music Core, SBS's Inkigayo and Mnet's M! Countdown. They also held a MelOn showcase on the day of album release.

== Track listing ==
No.	Title	Lyrics	Music	Length
1.	"Feel the Secret (Intro)"	Park Sooseok, Inwoo	Park Sooseok, Inwoo	1:12
2.	"I'm in Love"	Duble Sidekick	Duble Sidekick	3:28
3.	"Look at Me"	Marco	Marco, New Sun	3:23
4.	"U R Fired"	Park Sooseok, Inwoo	Park Sooseok, Inwoo	3:28
5.	"I Would Do Well"	Marco	Marco	3:05
6.	"I'm in Love (Instrumental)"		Duble Sidekick	3:28
Total length:				17:24

== Charts ==
=== Album chart ===
Chart	Peak position
Gaon Weekly album chart	2

=== Sales ===
Chart	Sales
Gaon physical sales	KOR: 10,931+

== Release history ==
Country	Date	Format	Label
South Korea	August 11, 2014	CD, Digital Download	TS Entertainment; LOEN Entertainment
Worldwide	August 11, 2014	Digital Download	Sony Music
