= Hope Torture =

2013 single album by Song Ji-eun

Hope Torture (False Hope)

Single album by Song Ji-eun
- Released: September 30, 2013
- Recorded: 2013
- Genre: K-pop; R&B; dance; ballad
- Length: 9:48
- Label: TS; LOEN

Song Ji-eun chronology
Hope Torture (False Hope) (2013)	25 (2014)

Singles from Hope Torture
- 1. "Hope Torture (False Hope)" Released: September 30, 2013

Hope Torture is the debut single album of South Korean singer Song Ji-eun, a member of South Korean girl group Secret. The album was released on September 30, 2013, with the song "Hope Torture" serving as the lead track. The album contains three songs. It also contains the first song Jieun helped write and compose for in Date Mate.

== Release ==
On September 24, Jieun released her mv teaser. On September 29, Jieun released the whole mv. On September 30, Jieun released the whole album.

== Promotion ==
Song Jieun promoted the single Hope Torture (False Hope) in music shows in September and October 2013 on KBS's Music Bank, MBC's Show! Music Core, SBS's Inkigayo and Mnet's M! Countdown. She also held a MelOn showcase on the day of her album release where she also sang Vintage with B.A.P's Zelo.

== Track listing ==
Track list
No.	Title	Lyrics	Music	Length
1.	"Vintage (feat. Zelo of B.A.P)"	Marco	Marco	3:21
2.	"Hope Torture (False Hope)" (희망고문)	Park Soo-seok; iNoo	Park Soo-seok; iNoo	3:12
3.	"Date Mate"	Park Soo-seok; iNoo; Song Ji-eun	Park Soo-seok; iNoo; Song Ji-eun	3:15
Total length:				9:48

== Charts ==
=== Album chart ===
Chart	Peak position
Gaon Weekly album chart	6

=== Singles chart ===
Song	Peak chart position
Song	KOR
"Hope Torture (False Hope)"	9

=== Sales ===
Chart	Sales
Gaon physical sales	KOR: 2,688+

== Release history ==
Country	Date	Format	Label
South Korea	September 30, 2013	CD, Digital Download	TS Entertainment; LOEN Entertainment
Worldwide	September 30, 2013	Digital Download	Sony Music
