= Top Secret (single album) =

Single album by Jun Hyoseong
- Released: May 12, 2014
- Recorded: 2014
- Genre: K-pop; R&B; dance
- Length: 9:57
- Label: TS Entertainment; LOEN Entertainment

Singles from Top Secret
- 1. "Good-night Kiss" Released: May 12, 2014

Top Secret is the debut solo single album of Jun Hyoseong, a member of South Korean girl group Secret. The album was released on May 12, 2014, with the song "Good-night Kiss" serving as the lead track. The album contains three songs. The album was released with a limited and normal edition.

== Release ==
On May 7, the music video teaser for the title song "Goodnight Kiss" was released. The full music video was released on May 11, and the EP was released the day after.

== Promotion ==
Jun Hyoseong promoted "Goodnight Kiss," as well as "Lonely Night" in music shows in May 2014 on KBS's Music Bank, MBC's Show! Music Core, SBS's Inkigayo and Mnet's M! Countdown. She also held a MelOn showcase on the day of her album release.

== Track listing ==
Track list
| No. | Title | Lyrics | Music | Arrangement | Length |
|---|---|---|---|---|---|
| 1. | "Don't Know Women (feat. J'Kyun)" (여자를 몰라) | Marco; J'Kyun | Marco | Marco | 3:18 |
| 2. | "Good-night Kiss" | Duble Sidekick | Duble Sidekick; Seion | Duble Sidekick | 3:25 |
| 3. | "Lonely Night" (밤이 싫어요) | Jeon Da-woon; KZ; Crazy Melody | Jeon Da-woon; KZ; Crazy Melody | Jeon Da-woon; KZ; Crazy Melody | 3:14 |
| Total length: | | | | | 9:57 |

== Charts ==
=== Album chart ===
| Chart | Peak position |
|---|---|
| Gaon Weekly album chart | 2 |

=== Singles chart ===
| Song | Peak chart position |
| Song | KOR |
|---|---|
| "Good-night Kiss" | 9 |

=== Sales ===
| Chart | Sales |
|---|---|
| Gaon physical sales | KOR: 11,067+ |

== Release history ==
| Country | Date | Format | Label |
|---|---|---|---|
| South Korea | May 12, 2014 | CD, Digital Download | TS Entertainment; LOEN Entertainment |
| Worldwide | May 12, 2014 | Digital Download | Sony Music |
