= Talk That (Secret song) =

Single by Secret
- Released: December 4, 2012
- Recorded: 2012
- Genre: Synthpop, K-pop, dance-pop
- Length: 3:37
- Label: TS Entertainment
- Songwriter: Shinsadong Tiger
- Producer: Shinsadong Tiger

Secret Korean singles chronology
"Poison" (2012)	"Talk That" (2012)	"YooHoo" (2013)

"Talk That" is a single by South Korean girl group Secret. It was released as a digital single on December 4, 2012, through TS Entertainment. The song marks as their second digital single without an accompanying physical release since "I Want You Back". The song was written and produced by Shinsadong Tiger whom they previously worked with "Magic". “Talk That” is a midtempo dance-pop song with influences from French-electronica genre and synthpop. Lyrically the song tells about the pain and grief felt by the protagonist after being betrayed by a loved one. "Talk That" received generally positive reviews from critics, most of whom had praised the song for its mature musical style and concept as opposed to their previous singles.

== Release ==
After wrapping up promotions for Poison on October, TS Entertainment revealed that Secret took a quick break while preparing for a new single in December, 2012. TS Entertainment also revealed that they will be working with a new producer. On November 26, TS Entertainment released Jieun's photo teaser for their upcoming single entitled, "Talk That". It was also announced that the group worked with Shinsadong Tiger for the track, whom they have previously worked with for their hit track "Magic" and the song will be released on December 4, 2012. On November 27 TS Entertainment released Hyoseong's teaser image for "Talk That". The following day TS Entertainment released Zinger's teaser photo for "Talk That". On November 29 TS Entertainment released the music video teaser for "Talk That". A group teaser image was later released by TS Entertainment. The music video for "Talk That" was produced by Zanybros' Hong Won-ki.

== Promotions ==
Secret had their comeback stage on Music Bank on December 7, 2012. The group also performed "Talk That" on Inkigayo on December 9, 2012.

== Critical reception ==
"Talk That" received generally positive reviews from critics, most of whom had praised the song for its mature musical style and concept as opposed to their previous singles. As Jacques Peterson of Pop Dust wrote, "When it comes to Korean girl group, SECRET, they usually serve up one of two concepts: ultra sexy, or ultra cute. Usually the former. But for their new single, “Talk That,” the girls have had a change of heart, not only trading in their signature brassy retro sound for gloomy synthpop, but also adopting a much more serious image than they’ve ever had before." Karen Shin of MTV Iggy shared the same sentiments and commented, "Who knew Secret could be anything other than bright and confident? Their new music video definitely “talks” for itself, showing the girls being vulnerable and heartbroken, and all." Shin further commented, "Secret made a complete 180[degree change] for their new image to promote “Talk That,” a ‘French-electric’ style song about a heartsick girl who’s just had her feelings toyed with.....We like this new side of Secret". Seoulbeats was rather lukewarm with its review and wrote that the song is "acceptable as an up-beat ballad with an emotionally driven MV." Seoul Beats added that compare to "Poison", the refinement for "Talk That" has turned out to be a good choice." Since the release of "Talk That" and its music video, the song is being met with favorable reviews for its fresh-sounding music and genre. Aside from the change of musical style that has met favorable reviews, Choi Hyun-Jung of Star N News complimented the members' vocals calling it, "impressive and expressive".

== Music video ==
On November 29 TS Entertainment released the music video teaser for "Talk That". The music video was officially released on December 4, 2012. The full music video reportedly took five days and four nights to film on both a music video set and in the sub-zero temperatures outside. Despite the cold working conditions, the Secret members were said to have immersed themselves fully into their roles to eagerly portray a whole new side of themselves. The music video features a solo dancing by Jun Hyoseong, and a short kissing scene involving Song Jieun. The music video for "Talk That" was directed by Zanybros' Hong Won-ki.

== Track listing ==
Korean Single:

No.	Title	Length
1.	"Talk That"	3:37
Total length:		3:37

== Credits and personnel ==
These credits were adapted from the Talk That liner notes.

- Kim Tae-sung – executive producer co-producing
- Song Jieun – vocals
- Han Sunhwa – vocals
- Jun Hyoseong – vocals
- Jung Hana – vocals
- Shinsadong Tiger – co-producing, songwriting, arranger, music

== Charts ==
Chart	Peak position
South Korea (Gaon)	6
South Korea (K-pop Hot 100)	6

=== Sales ===
Chart	Sales
South Korea (Gaon)	943,066
