= Letter from Secret =

EP by Secret
- Released: April 30, 2013
- Genre: K-pop; bubblegum pop; dance-pop
- Label: TS

Secret chronology
Poison (2012)	Letter from Secret (2013)	Secret Summer (2014)

Singles from Letter from Secret
- 1. "YooHoo" Released: April 30, 2013

Letter from Secret is the fifth extended play (promoted fourth Korean EP) by South Korean girl group Secret. The EP was released on April 30, 2013 and contains four tracks. "YooHoo", the album's lead single, marked the group's return to aegyo-inspired songs such as "Shy Boy" and "Starlight Moonlight".

== Promotion ==
Secret had their comeback performance on M Countdown on May 2, 2013. The group also performed "YooHoo" on various music shows such as Music Bank, Show! Music Core and Inkigayo in May and June 2013. Secret made a Japanese comeback on July 23, 2014 with the Japanese version of "YooHoo".

== Track listing ==
No.	Title	Lyrics	Music	Length
1.	"YooHoo"	Kang Jiwon, Kim Kibum	Kang Jiwon, Kim Kibum	3:20
2.	"키다리 아저씨" ((Daddy Long Legs))	Jung Hana (Zinger), Park Soo Suk, INOO	Park Soo Suk, Yoo Young Min	3:12
3.	"ONLY U"	Jung Hana, Jun Da Woon, MARCO	Jun Da Woon, MARCO	3:47
4.	"B.O.Y" ((Because of You))	Park Soo Suk, INOO	Park Soo Suk, INOO	4:05
Total length:				14:33

== Chart performance ==
"YooHoo" peaked at number 5 on the Gaon Singles Chart and has 978,757 downloads. The EP has in total 1,063,071 DLs while it sold 8,532 copies.

=== Charts ===
Chart	Peak position
Gaon Weekly album chart	7
Gaon Monthly album chart	15

=== Sales ===
Chart	Sales
Gaon physical sales	KOR: 8,532+

== Release history ==
Country	Date	Format	Label
South Korea	April 30, 2013	CD, Digital Download	TS Entertainment; LOEN Entertainment
Worldwide	April 30, 2013	Digital Download	Sony Music

== Credits and personnel ==
These credits were adapted from the Letter from Secret liner notes.

- Kim Tae-sung – executive producer co-producing
- Song Jieun – vocals
- Han Sunhwa – vocals
- Jun Hyoseong – vocals
- Jung Hana – vocals, rap
- Kang Jiwon – co-producing, songwriting, arranger, music
- Kim Kibum – co-producing, songwriting, music
