= 25 (EP) =

EP by Song Ji-eun
- Released: October 14, 2014 (Korean Version); December 2, 2014 (Japanese version)
- Recorded: 2014
- Genres: Dance; ballad
- Length: 15:34
- Labels: TS; LOEN

Song Ji-eun chronology
Hope Torture (2013)	25 (2014)	Bobby Doll (2016)

Singles from 25
- 1. "Don't Look At Me Like That" Released: September 23, 2014; 2. "Pretty Age 25" Released: October 14, 2014; 3. "Twenty-Five (Japanese Version)" Released: December 2, 2014; 4. "Don't Look At Me Like That (Japanese Version)" Released: December 3, 2014

25 is the debut extended play by South Korean singer Song Ji-eun, a member of South Korean girl group Secret. The EP was released on October 14, 2014 with the song "Pretty Age 25" serving as the lead track and "Don't Look At Me Like That" as a pre-release. The album contains five songs and was released in two versions.

== Release ==
On September 23, Song Ji-eun released her first single "Don't Look At Me Like That", along with a music video. On October 13, the music video for her second single, "Pretty Age 25", was released. 25 was released on October 14. On December 2, Song Ji-eun released her first Japanese single, "Twenty-Five (Japanese Version)", from her first Japanese extended play, 25. On December 3, she released a Japanese version of "Don't Look At Me Like That".

== Promotion ==
Song Ji-eun promoted the singles "Don't Look At Me Like That" and "Pretty Age 25" in September and October 2014 on KBS's Music Bank, MBC's Show! Music Core, SBS's Inkigayo and Mnet's M! Countdown. She also held a MelOn showcase on the day of her album release where she also performed her self-composed song "Star".

== Track listing ==
Track list
No.	Title	Lyrics	Music	Arrangement	Length
1.	"Janus" (Intro)	Park Soo-seok; iNoo	Park Soo-seok; iNoo	Park Soo-seok; iNoo	1:12
2.	"Pretty Age 25" (예쁜 나이 25살)	Duble Sidekick; DayDay	Duble Sidekick; Radio Galaxi	Radio Galaxi	3:25
3.	"Don't Look At Me Like That" (쳐다보지마)	StarTrack	StarTrack	StarTrack	3:14
4.	"La Boum"	Park Soo-seok; Park Eun-woo	Park Soo-seok; Park Eun-woo	Park Soo-seok	3:00
5.	"Star" (별)	Song Ji-eun	Song Ji-eun	Park Soo-seok; iNoo	3:48
Total length:					14:39

"25" (Japanese Version)
No.	Title	Writer(s)	Length
1.	"Twenty-Five (Japanese Version)"	Duble Sidekick, David Kim	3:25
2.	"Don't Look At Me Like That (Japanese Version)"	StarTrack	3:14
3.	"La Boum (Japanese Version)"	Park Soo-suk, INOO	3:01
4.	"Vintage (Japanese Version)" (featuring Zelo of B.A.P)		3:27
5.	"Star ( 별)"		3:48
6.	"Twenty-Five (Inst.)"		3:25
Total length:			20:20

"25" (Japanese Version) DVD
No.	Title	Length
1.	"Pretty Age 25 (Japanese Version)"
2.	"Pretty Age 25 (Japanese Version) Backstage music video"

== Chart performance ==
=== Albums chart ===
Chart	Peak position
Gaon Weekly album chart	6

=== Sales ===
Chart	Sales
Gaon physical sales	KOR: 5,796+

=== Singles chart ===
Song	Peak chart position	Sales
Song	KOR	Sales
"Don't Look At Me Like That"	27	KOR (DL): 119,127
"Pretty Age 25"	15	KOR (DL): 255,349

== Release history ==
Country	Date	Format	Label
South Korea	October 14, 2014	CD, digital download	TS Entertainment; LOEN Entertainment
Japan	December 2, 2014	CD, digital download	TS Entertainment; LOEN Entertainment
