= Poison (Secret EP) =

EP by Secret
- Released: September 13, 2012
- Recorded: 2012
- Genres: K-pop; dance-pop; electropop
- Length: 18:02
- Label: TS
- Producer: Kim Tae-song

Secret chronology
Moving in Secret (2011)	Poison (2012)	Letter from Secret (2013)

Singles from Poison
- 1. "Poison" Released: September 13, 2012

Poison is the fourth extended play (promoted as third Korean EP) by South Korean girl group Secret. Following their Japanese promotions in 2012, TS Entertainment announced that the group will have its comeback in South Korea after almost a year absence in the South Korean music industry. The EP was released on September 13, 2012, and contains five tracks, including the title track of the same name.

== Background ==
In August 2012, TS Entertainment announced that after nearly a year absence in the South Korean music scene, Secret would have a comeback in South Korea sometime in September. The song was described as an "upbeat dance track" and was written and produced by Kang Ji Won and Kim Ki Bum whom they previously worked with their previous hit singles. TS Entertainment stated, "'Poison' will have all the unique characteristics and colors of Secret but will have a change in concept from the cute and friendly image [shown in the past] to a sexy and feminine concept. It will be a new leaping point for Secret." TS Entertainment emphasized that the song is "armed with a fresh, new, musical style and a feminine concept". The agency added it planned to show an upgraded level of the bright and healthy woman image the group has been known for in the past.

== Singles ==
"Poison (2012)"
A 25-second sample of the song. Secret sings the chorus and hook of the song featuring repeating saxophone segments, synthesizers and drum instrumentation.

"Poison" is an uptempo song with influences from R&B, Jazz and Hip-Hop music which uses repeating saxophone segments. The song was written and produced by Kang Ji Won and Kim Ki Bum whom Secret had previously worked with their previous singles. The audio mixing for the title track "Poison" was mixed by Grammy Award-winning musician Lu Diaz, who have mixed tracks for Pitbull, DJ Khaled and other American artists. And to raise the overall quality of the song, Chris Gehringer (from Sterling Sound) was called in from America for the audio mastering of "Poison". Gehringer has mastered the sounds of world-famous artists such as Madonna, Jason Mraz, Lady Gaga, Rihanna and others. Lyrically, the song describes the protagonist's feelings of being unable to break away even while knowing that as one falls in love, it only ends up becoming poison to the individual.

=== Music video ===
The music video for the song was recorded in August 2012. Three days after its release on September 13, 2012, the music video had accumulated more than 1.99 million views on YouTube Korea. On September 7, 2012, TS Entertainment released a 30-second video teaser of "Poison" which features the intro and the hook of the song. Featuring an old Hollywood styled concept, the music video revolves around Secret acting as thieves while seducing a male detective to steal jewelry and ended up killing him. The theme of the music video was based on the 1940s British ‘lady look’ and ‘espionage look’. The concept of the music video was influenced by film noir and portrays a femme fatale image. The song's music video was directed by Hong Won-ki of ZanyBros, who also directed the music videos of B.A.P's "Warrior", Girls’ Generation’s "The Boys", B2ST’s "Shock" and their single "Love is Move".

=== Live performances ===
Between September 13 to 17, 2012, Secret had their comeback stage on M! Countdown, Music Bank, Music Core and Inkigayo performing "Calling U" first and followed by their lead single, "Poison". On September 15, 2012, Secret attended the World Cyber Games 2012 and performed "Poison" together with their previous singles "Shy Boy", "Starlight Moonlight" and "Love is Move".

== Track listing ==
No.	Title	Lyrics	Music	Length
1.	"Telepathy"	Kang Jiwon, Kim Kibum	Kang Jiwon, Kim Kibum	3:43
2.	"Poison"	Kang Jiwon, Kim Kibum	Kang Jiwon, Kim Kibum	3:25
3.	"Falling in Love"	Park Soo Seok, Hana	Park Soo Seok	4:18
4.	"Calling U"	Jeon Da Woon, MARCO, Hana	Jeon Da Woon, MARCO	3:34
5.	"1, 2, 3"	Hana, 2Story (Brandon Fraley, Jamelle Fraley), Javier Solis	2Story (Brandon Fraley, Jamelle Fraley), Javier Solis	3:02
Total length:				18:02

== Credits and personnel ==
These credits were adapted from the Poison liner notes.

- Kim Tae-sung – executive producer co-producing
- Song Jieun – vocals
- Han Sunhwa – vocals
- Jun Hyoseong – vocals
- Jung Hana – vocals, rap, songwriting
- Kang Jiwon – songwriting, arranger, music
- Kim Kibum – songwriting, music
- Park Soo Seok – songwriting, arranger, music
- Jeon Da Woon – songwriting, arranger, music
- MARCO – songwriting, arranger, music
- Brandon Fraley – songwriting, arranger, music
- Jamelle Fraley – songwriting, arranger, music
- Javier Solis – songwriting, music

== Charts ==
Chart	Peak position
Gaon Weekly album chart	3
Gaon Monthly album chart	10

=== Sales ===
Chart	Sales
Gaon physical sales	10,886+ (South Korea)

== Release history ==
Country	Date	Format	Label
South Korea	September 13, 2012	CD, Digital Download	TS Entertainment; LOEN Entertainment
Worldwide	September 13, 2012	Digital Download	TS Entertainment; LOEN Entertainment
