= Shy Boy (EP) =

EP by Secret
- Released: November 16, 2011
- Recorded: Summer 2011
- Genre: K-pop; dance-pop
- Length: 22:15
- Label: Sony Music

Secret chronology
Moving in Secret (2011)	Shy Boy (2011)	Welcome to Secret Time (2012)

Singles from Shy Boy
- 1. "Shy Boy" Released: November 16, 2011; 2. "Christmas Magic" Released: December 7, 2011

Shy Boy is the third extended play (first Japanese release) by South Korean girl group Secret. The EP was released on November 16, 2011, it contains six songs. All songs are remakes of Secret's Korean songs including "Shy Boy" and "Starlight Moonlight".

== Release ==
The plans of "Shy Boy" as Secret's second Japanese single was first announced on August 28, 2011. On September 28, 2011, teasers for the "Shy Boy" music video was released. The official music video was revealed on October 8, 2011. On November 8, 2011, the official music video for "Christmas Magic", a remake of "Starlight Moonlight" with a new Christmas beat was unveiled. The EP was released to music stores on November 16, 2011.

On November 22, 2011, it was announced that a Christmas Edition of the album will be released to music stores on December 7, 2011. The album cover is themed after Christmas, with Secret wearing clothing resembling Santa Claus.

== Promotions ==
To promote the album, Secret appeared on a Japanese variety show, Made in BS Japan on October 12, 2011. Also, Secret had a Shy Boy Album Release Party at the BRITZ at Akasaka on November 16, 2011.

== Track listing ==
Standard Edition
No.	Title	Length
1.	"Shy Boy" (Japanese Version)	3:39
2.	"Christmas Magic" (Starlight Moonlight) (Japanese Christmas Version)	3:59
3.	"Together" (Japanese Version)	3:43
4.	"笑わないで" (Don’t Laugh) (Japanese Version)	3:45
5.	"Movie Star" (Japanese Version)	3:19
6.	"La La La" (Japanese Version)	3:50
Total length:		22:15

DVD (Limited Edition A)
No.	Title	Length
1.	"Shy Boy" (Japanese Version) (Music Video)
2.	"Shy Boy" (Japanese Version) (Dance Music Video)
3.	"Shy Boy" (Japanese Version) (Music Video - Behind The Scenes Footage)

DVD (Limited Edition B)
No.	Title	Length
1.	"Magic" (Live at Secret's first Japanese showcase)
2.	"La La La" (Live at Secret's first Japanese showcase)
3.	"My Boy" (Live at Secret's first Japanese showcase)
4.	"チャリピウム" (Empty Space) (Live at Secret's first Japanese showcase)
5.	"Madonna" (Live at Secret's first Japanese showcase)

Christmas Edition
No.	Title	Length
1.	"Christmas Magic" (Starlight Moonlight) (Japanese Christmas Version)	3:59
2.	"Shy Boy" (Japanese Version)	3:39
3.	"Together" (Japanese Version)	3:43
4.	"笑わないで" (Don’t Laugh) (Japanese Version)	3:45
5.	"Movie Star" (Japanese Version)	3:19
6.	"La La La" (Japanese Version)	3:50
Total length:		22:15

DVD (Christmas Edition)
No.	Title	Length
1.	"Christmas Magic" (Music Video)

== Chart ==
Year	Title	Oricon Peak			Oricon Sales	
Year	Title	Daily	Weekly	Monthly	Debut	Overall
2011	"Shy Boy"	5	9	50	9,318	11,119+
"—" denotes releases that did not chart or were not released in that region.

== Release history ==
Country	Date	Format	Label
Worldwide	November 16, 2011	Digital download	Sony Music Associated Records
Japan	November 16, 2011	CD, Digital download	Sony Music Associated Records
Japan	December 7, 2011	CD, Digital download (Christmas edition)	Sony Music Associated Records
