= Moving in Secret =

Studio album by Secret
- Released: October 18, 2011
- Recorded: 2011
- Genres: K-pop; dance-pop; synth-pop
- Length: 35:06
- Label: TS
- Producer: Kim Tae-sung

Secret chronology
Madonna (2010)	Moving in Secret (2011)	Shy Boy (2011)

Singles from Moving in Secret
- 1. "Love is Move" Released: October 17, 2011

Moving in Secret is the debut studio album (first Korean regular album) by South Korean girl group Secret. It was released on October 18, 2011, by TS Entertainment. The title track, "Love is Move", was released on October 17, 2011. It marked the group's first release in a year since their 2010 EP, Madonna.

== Background and release ==
On August 28, 2011, TS Entertainment revealed that Secret would release their first full-length album in Korea before returning with "Shy Boy" in Japan in November 2011. On September 9, TS Entertainment confirmed that Secret would make a comeback with their first full-length Korean album sometime in October, joining Girls' Generation, Kara, T-ara, Brown Eyed Girls, IU and Wonder Girls with the same promotion cycle in late 2011. On October 11, TS Entertainment revealed that the title of their first full-length album was to be Moving in Secret and their new song would show Secret's confident and sexy side. The same day, the official album cover and track listing were unveiled, and their agency revealed that the producers for their comeback song, titled "Love is Move", were Kang Ji Won and Kim Ki Bum, the same producers of their previous hits such as "Magic", "Madonna", "Shy Boy" and "Starlight Moonlight". They added that "Love is Move" is a pop dance song that has "enhanced Secret's colors" and will have an "addictive chorus plus strong beats". The official music video for "Love is Move" was released on October 17, 2011, with the album release the next day.

== Singles ==
"Love is Move (2011)"
A 20-second sample of the song, featuring horns, synthesizers and drum instrumentation.

"Love is Move" is an uptempo song, composed in a contemporary pop style. Its lyrics tells of a falling relationship in a woman's perspective on how the protagonists incessantly warns her lover that she shouldn't be taken for granted because her feelings towards him might change instantly. The song incorporates various instruments, including horns, electric guitar, bass effect, synthesizers and heavy drum instrumentation. The song layers background vocals throughout the chorus and sections of the bridge. "Love is Move" is a retro-inspired song that draws its influences from the 1930s swing music. Kang Ji Won and Kim Ki Bum both produced, wrote the song's lyrics and melody, while Kang Ji Won arranged the track. According to Catherine Deen from Yahoo! Philippines, "Love is Move" promises to be an updated pop-rock dance-floor romp for Secret unlike [their] previous hits [such as] "Madonna" and "Magic".

The concept of the music video for "Love is Move" was inspired by 1930s cartoon character Betty Boop. TS Entertainment said in a press release, "The Betty Boop character is still an icon to many women because of her ability to speak her mind while still maintaining her feminine charisma. The idea behind Betty Boop seemed to match the haughty and confident image that Secret is trying to express for this concept."

== Promotions ==
Love is Move was performed on various live television music shows. Secret had their comeback performance on Mnet's M! Countdown on October 20, 2011, performing Don't Laugh in addition to Love is Move. The group performed Love is Move on various music shows such as Music Bank, Music Core, MTV's The Show and Inkigayo throughout October and November 2011. Secret also performed the song on many Hallyu Dream Concerts and on various international television appearances. Secret performed Love is Move on B.A.P's debut showcase held in Seoul, South Korea in January 2012. The group also performed the song on MBC's 2012 Music Festival.

== Chart performance ==
In South Korea, Love is Move entered the Gaon Single Charts at number 3 during the week of October 23, 2011. The song debuted on Billboard's K-Pop Hot 100 chart at number 39. The following week it jumped 36 places and peaked at number 3 on the K-Pop Hot 100 chart.

== Track listing ==
Track list
No.	Title	Lyrics	Music	Arrangement	Length
1.	"Love is Move" (사랑은 MOVE; Sarangeun MOVE)	Kang Jiwon, Kim Kibum	Kang Jiwon, Kim Kibum	Kang Jiwon	3:20
2.	"Sexy" (섹시하게; Sexyhage)	Kim Kibum, Marco	Kim Kibum, Marco	Marco	3:25
3.	"Don't Laugh" (웃지좀마; Eutji Jom Ma)	Im Sanghyuk, Jeon Daun, Hana	Im Sanghyuk, Jeon Daun	Im Sanghyuk, Jeon Daun	3:43
4.	"Movie Star"	Taebong-i, Ssaijyeo, Yeonpil, Hana	Taebong-i, Ssaijyeo	Taebong-i, Ssaijyeo	3:18
5.	"Amazinger" (Hana solo)	Marco, Hana	Marco	Marco	3:31
6.	"Together"	Twelve, Hana	Dani	Dani	3:41
7.	"I Hope" (바래; Barae)	Im Sanghyuk, Jeon Daun	Im Sanghyuk, Jeon Daun	Im Sanghyuk, Jeon Daun	3:39
8.	"Bastard"	Isang-in	Isang-in	Isang-in	3:38
9.	"Neverland"	Inwoo	Park Suseok	Park Suseok	3:31
10.	"Love is Move" (Instrumental)	Kang Jiwon, Kim Kibum	Kang Jiwon, Kim Kibum	Kang Jiwon	3:20
Total length:					35:06

== Credits and personnel ==
These credits were adapted from the Moving in Secret liner notes.

- Kim Tae-sung – executive producer co-producing
- Song Jieun – vocals
- Han Sunhwa – vocals
- Jun Hyoseong – vocals
- Jung Hana – vocals, rap, songwriting
- Kang Jiwon – co-producing, songwriting, arranger, music
- Kim Kibum – co-producing, songwriting, music

== Charts ==
=== Album chart ===
Chart	Peak position
Gaon Weekly album chart	3
Gaon Monthly album chart	10
Gaon Yearly album chart	93

=== Sales ===
Chart	Sales
Gaon physical sales	16,619

== Release history ==
Country	Date	Format	Label
South Korea	October 18, 2011	CD, Digital	TS Entertainment; LOEN Entertainment
Worldwide	October 18, 2011	CD	TS Entertainment; LOEN Entertainment
Worldwide	October 23, 2011	Digital	TS Entertainment; LOEN Entertainment
