= Starlight Moonlight =

Single by Secret
- Released: June 1, 2011
- Recorded: 2011
- Genre: K-pop
- Length: 3:54
- Label: TS Entertainment
- Songwriters: Kang Jiwon, Kim Kibum
- Producers: Kang Jiwon, Kim Kibum

Secret Korean singles chronology
"Shy Boy" (2011)	"Starlight Moonlight" (2011)	"Love is Move" (2011)

"Starlight Moonlight" (Korean: 별빛달빛) is a song by South Korean Kpop girl group Secret. The song was released as a CD single on June 1, 2011, through TS Entertainment. The song was written and produced by Kang Ji Won and Kim Ki Bum, the same producers of their previous hits such as "Magic", "Madonna" and "Shy Boy". “Starlight Moonlight” is a sweet, retro-inspired song with influences of traditional Korean folk music. The song's lyrics describe the protagonist's feelings when the man confesses his love, and compares the protagonist's feeling towards her lover as bright as the “Starlight” and “Moonlight”.

The music video for the song was recorded in May 2011. A video teaser was first released on May 29, 2011, hinting the retro folksy sound of the song. The audio that was used in the video teaser was “Oh! Honey”, one of the three songs in the CD single. The music video was built on a fantasy-inspired theme focusing on Han Sunhwa’s daydream over an admirer, which led her to different scenes in the music video while dancing and singing along with the other members.

“Starlight Moonlight” was well received by music critics and among netizens, and charted strongly throughout various music charts. The song debuted at number ten on the Gaon Single Chart and peaked at number two. By the end of June, "Starlight Moonlight" was the number one song on Gaon's Monthly Single Chart. The song also peaked at number one on various online music charts such as Dosirak, Bugs and Melon. On June 19, 2011, the song won the Mutizen award on SBS's Inkigayo. The song was remade into a Christmas version with Japanese lyrics, and it was on Secret's first Japanese EP, Shy Boy. According to Gaon Chart, "Starlight Moonlight" has sold over 3 million digital downloads in South Korea as of December 31, 2011, making it one of Secret's biggest singles.

== Release ==
Secret released the teaser for their single "Starlight Moonlight" on May 27, 2011. A video teaser was first released with Oh! Honey, one of the songs in the CD single as the audio. The video teaser was set in rural area where the girls are riding a train and setting a campfire in their destination. The same day, TS Entertainment released the fantasy-like comeback photos for "Starlight Moonlight" with a different theme from the retro-inspired video teaser. The single was released on music stores and digital music sites on June 1, 2011. The official music video was unveiled on the same day. A Christmas version of the song entitled "Christmas Magic" was released as a promotional single for Secret's first Japanese EP, Shy Boy.

== Promotions ==
"Starlight Moonlight" was performed on various live television music shows as well as most of Secret's present and future live television show appearances. Secret had their comeback stage on M Countdown on June 1, 2011. The group also performed “Starlight Moonlight” on various music shows such as Music Bank, Show! Music Core and Inkigayo in June and July 2011. Secret also performed the song on many Hallyu Dream Concerts and on various international television appearances.

== Chart performance ==
"Starlight Moonlight"
A 23-second song sample of Starlight Moonlight Korean version.

In South Korea, "Starlight Moonlight" entered the Gaon Single Chart at number 10 during the week of June 4, 2011. The following week, "Starlight Moonlight" jumped eight spots and peaked at number two during its chart run. The song continued its success and stayed in the top 10 for another 5 weeks, 4 weeks of those stays were in the Top 5. In Music Bank's year-end K-Chart, "Starlight Moonlight" ranked at number 6 for the most popular and downloaded song in 2011 despite not placing at number one in the chart.

"Starlight Moonlight" also has an accompanying CD single release. The album debuted at number 2 on Gaon Album Chart. It finished at number nine on Gaon's Monthly Album Chart selling 8,410 copies. As of August 2011, "Starlight Moonlight" sold over 10,775 copies.

== Music video ==
The music video for the song was recorded in May 2011. The music video for "Starlight Moonlight" features three different scenes from an old hot-air balloon station, in the clouds with a hot air balloon and a fantasy island under a big moonlight. Directed by Johnny Bro's Hong Wonki, the music video was released on June 1, 2011. The video has a fantasy inspired and retro concept. Additionally, labelmate Yongguk from B.A.P made an appearance as the ticket-seller in the hot-air balloon station. Other B.A.P members, Himchan, Jongup and Youngjae also make appearances in the station and dance along with them.

== Track listing ==
Korean single
No.	Title	Lyrics	Music	Length
1.	"오! 허니 (Oh! Honey)"	Kang Jiwon, Kim Kibum	Kang Jiwon, Kim Kibum	2:34
2.	"별빛달빛 (Starlight, Moonlight)"	Kang Jiwon, Kim Kibum	Kang Jiwon, Kim Kibum	3:54
3.	"멜로영화 (Melodrama)"	Kang Jiwon, Kim Kibum	Kang Jiwon, Kim Kibum	3:12
Total length:				10:00

== Awards and nominations ==
Music program awards
Program	Date
Inkigayo	June 19, 2011

== Credits and personnel ==
These credits were adapted from the Starlight Moonlight liner notes.

- Kim Tae-sung – executive producer co-producing
- Song Jieun – vocals
- Han Sunhwa – vocals
- Jun Hyoseong – vocals
- Jung Hana – vocals
- Kang Jiwon – co-producing, songwriting, arranger, music
- Kim Kibum – co-producing, songwriting, music

== Charts ==
=== Album chart ===
Chart	Peak position
Gaon Weekly Album Chart	2
Gaon Monthly Album Chart	9

=== Sales ===
Chart	Sales
Gaon physical sales	10,775+ (South Korea)
Gaon digital sales	2,987,080+ (South Korea, 2011 only)

=== Singles chart ===
Song	Peak position
Song	Gaon Chart
"Starlight Moonlight"	2
"Oh! Honey"	76
"Melodrama"	136

=== "Starlight Moonlight" ===
Chart	Peak position
Gaon Singles Chart	2

== Release history ==
Country	Date	Format	Label
Various	June 1, 2011	Digital download	TS Entertainment
South Korea	June 1, 2011	CD, digital download	TS Entertainment
