= Madonna (EP) =

EP by Secret
- Released: August 12, 2010
- Recorded: Early 2010
- Genre: K-pop; electropop; dance-pop
- Label: TS; LOEN

Secret chronology
Secret Time (2010)	Madonna (2010)	Moving in Secret (2011)

Singles from Madonna
- 1. "Madonna" Released: August 12, 2010

Madonna is the second Korean extended play (EP) by South Korean girl group Secret. It was released on August 12, 2010 through TS Entertainment, and contains five tracks. The EP debuted at No. 5 on the Gaon Album Chart, while the album's lead single "Madonna" debuted at No. 1 on the Gaon Singles Chart and sold over 1,839,869 digital copies in South Korea throughout 2010. Kang Jiwon and Kim Kibum, the composers who wrote "Madonna" highlighted that the inspiration behind the song is about living with confidence by becoming an icon in this generation, like the American singer Madonna.

== Promotion ==
"Madonna" was first used as a promotional track from the album. On August 5, 2010, a teaser video was released online. In the teaser, the girls were performing the album track "Empty Space". The final music video premiered on August 12, 2010 along with Madonna's release. Secret had their debut performances of "Madonna" on Mnet's M! Countdown, KBS's Music Bank, MBC's Show! Music Core and SBS's Inkigayo from August 12 to August 15.

== Track listing ==
No.	Title	Lyrics	Music	Length
1.	"Madonna"	Kang Jiwon	Kang Jiwon, Kim Kibum	03:41
2.	"La La La"	Marco, Jung Hana (Zinger)	Marco	03:51
3.	"잘해 더 (Do It Better)" (feat. Baekchan of 8eight)	Baekchan	Baekchan	03:17
4.	"줄듯말듯 (Hesitant)"	Mario, Hwang Sung Jin, Zinger	Mario, Hwang Sung Jin	03:45
5.	"자리비움 (Empty Space)"	Im Sang Hyuk, Kim Kibum	Im Sang Hyuk, Kim Kibum	03:37
Total length:				18:11

== Charts ==
=== Album chart ===
Chart	Peak position
Gaon Weekly Album Chart	5

=== Sales ===
Chart	Sales
Gaon physical sales	15,000+ (South Korea)

== Release history ==
Country	Date	Format	Label
South Korea	August 12, 2010	CD, Digital Download	TS Entertainment
Taiwan	August 12, 2010	CD, Digital Download	Sony Music
Worldwide	August 12, 2010	Digital Download	Sony Music

== Credits and personnel ==
These credits were adapted from the Madonna (EP) liner notes.

- Kim Tae-sung – executive producer co-producing
- Song Jieun – vocals
- Han Sunhwa – vocals
- Jun Hyoseong – vocals
- Jung Hana – vocals, rap
- Kang Jiwon – co-producing, songwriting, arranger, music
- Kim Kibum – co-producing, songwriting, music
