= Shy Boy (Secret song) =

Single by South Korean girl group Secret

Single by Secret
- B-side: "No. 1"
- Released: January 6, 2011
- Recorded: 2010
- Genre: Pop, K-pop, bubblegum pop
- Length: 3:38
- Label: TS Entertainment
- Songwriters: Kang Jiwon, Kim Kibum
- Producers: Kang Jiwon, Kim Kibum

Secret Korean singles chronology
"Madonna" (2010)	"Shy Boy" (2011)	"Starlight Moonlight" (2011)

"Shy Boy" (Korean: 샤이보이) is a single by South Korean girl group Secret. It is released as a CD single on January 6, 2011 through TS Entertainment. The song was written and produced by Kang Jiwon and Kim Kibum. It was remade with Japanese lyrics and was on Secret's first Japanese EP, Shy Boy. According to Gaon, "Shy Boy" has sold over 2,215,864 digital downloads in South Korea as of December 31, 2011.

== Release ==
Secret released the teaser for their single "Shy Boy" on January 2, 2011. The single was released on music stores and digital music sites on January 6, 2011. The official music video was unveiled on the same day. On January 21, 2011, it was announced that the single album has sold all of the initial shipments. A representative from TS Entertainment said, "The album sales are exceeding our expectations. It’s a shame that we couldn’t provide enough copies to music stores, but we will deliver more supplies as soon as possible."

== Promotions ==
Secret had their comeback performance on M Countdown on January 6, 2011. The group also performed Shy Boy on various music shows such as Music Bank, Music Core and Inkigayo in January and February 2011.

== Chart performance ==
In South Korea, "Shy Boy" entered the Gaon Single Charts at number 18 during the week of January 8, 2011. "Shy Boy" rose to number 2 the following week and fell down to number 4 in its third week of its chart run. The song continued its success and stayed in the top 10 for another 3 weeks. In a year-end chart by Olleh Music, "Shy Boy" ranked at number 5 for best selling and most streamed songs for the year.

"Shy Boy" also has an accompanying CD single release. The album debuted at Number 11 in Gaon Monthly Album Charts selling 7,818 copies in the month of January. As of November 2011, "Shy Boy" sold 21,294 copies in South Korea.

== Music video ==
The music video for "Shy Boy" features an American retro background from the 60s. Directed by Johnny Bro's Hong Wonki, the music video was released on January 6, 2011. The video has a "swing dance concept" with outfits, hairstyles and sets that draws inspirations from the American culture in 1950s. Additionally, labelmate Son Heonsoo makes a surprise appearance in the music video. As well as fellow labelmates Bang Yong-guk, Kim Himchan, and Moon Jongup from B.A.P.

== Track listing ==
Korean single
No.	Title	Lyrics	Music	Length
1.	"샤이보이 (Shy Boy)"	Kang Jiwon, Kim Kibum	Kang Jiwon, Kim Kibum	3:38
2.	"No. 1"	Jung Hana, Marco	Marco	3:27
3.	"샤이보이 (Shy Boy)" (instrumental)	-	Kang Jiwon, Kim Kibum	3:38
4.	"No. 1" (instrumental)	-	Marco	3:27
Total length:				14:10

== Awards and nominations ==
Music program awards
Program	Date
M Countdown	January 13, 2011
Music Bank	February 4, 2011
Music Bank	February 11, 2011
Music Bank	February 18, 2011
Inkigayo	February 20, 2011

== Credits and personnel ==
These credits were adapted from the Shy Boy liner notes.

- Kim Tae-sung – executive producer co-producing
- Song Jieun – vocals
- Han Sunhwa – vocals
- Jun Hyoseong – vocals
- Jung Hana – vocals, rap
- Kang Jiwon – co-producing, songwriting, arranger, music
- Kim Kibum – co-producing, songwriting, music

== Charts ==
=== Album chart ===
Chart	Peak position
Gaon Weekly Album Chart	4
Gaon Monthly Album Chart	11

=== Sales ===
Chart	Sales
Gaon physical sales	21,294+ (South Korea)
Gaon digital sales	2,215,864+ (South Korea, 2011 only)

=== Singles chart ===
Song	Peak position
Song	Gaon Chart
"Shy Boy"	2
"No. 1"	190

=== Shy Boy ===
Chart	Peak position
Gaon Singles Chart	2
Gaon Monthly Singles chart	3
