= Secret Time =

EP by Secret
- Released: April 1, 2010
- Recorded: 2009–2010
- Genres: K-pop; electropop; dance-pop
- Labels: TS; LOEN

Secret chronology
| Secret Time (2010) | Madonna (2010) |

Singles from Secret Time
- 1. "I Want You Back" Released: October 13, 2009; 2. "Magic" Released: April 1, 2010

Secret Time is the debut Korean extended play (EP) by South Korean girl group Secret. The EP was released on April 1, 2010, and contains ten tracks. "Magic" was used as the promotional song for the album. The song debuted at number 2 on South Korea's Gaon Singles Chart and the album debuted at number 4 on the Gaon Album Chart on April 1.

== Promotion ==
"Magic" was first used as a promotional track from the album. On March 29, 2010, a teaser video was released online. In the teaser, the girls were performing a dance track called "Break Time". The final music video premiered on April 1, 2010, along with Secret Time's release. Due to printing errors, the physical release for their mini-album was delayed for five days but was released online on various music portal sites. The music video reached 1 million views on video sharing sites such as YouTube and Cyworld and the "Suspender Dance", which was featured in the music video teaser for "Magic", gained popularity among netizens.

Secret had their debut performances of "Magic" on Mnet's M! Countdown, KBS's Music Bank, MBC's Show! Music Core and SBS's Inkigayo from April 8 to April 11.

== Singles ==
=== "I Want You Back" ===
"I Want You Back (2009)"
A 22-second sample of the song.

"I Want You Back" served as Secret's debut single and was released as a digital single on October 13, 2009. Although digitally released, the song had a B-side which is a ballad called "3 years and 6 months". "I Want You Back" is a love song, featuring pop, R&B and hip-hop influences. It incorporates synthesizers during the song's intro and chorus.

The music video for "I Want You Back" opens up a drama sequence wherein Jieun was fighting with her boyfriend and ended up breaking their relationship. Soon after the opening, the girls started to sing the song and reminisce the times when they were still in a relationship with their lover. Throughout the music video, the girls were seen remembering the past moments with their lover and how they regretted they broke up with their boyfriends.

=== "Magic" ===
"Magic" (매직) is the album's lead single and was used a promotional track. The song was written and produced by hit composers Shinsadong Tiger, Kang Ji Won and Kim Ki Bum. The song peaked at number two on the Gaon Single Chart. According to Gaon, "Magic" has sold over 2,287,835 digital copies in South Korea within the year of 2010. The group said that the pronunciation of the song's chorus is a combination of the words magic and music. The music video for "Magic" reached 1 million views on video sharing sites such as YouTube and Cyworld and the "Suspender Dance", which was featured in the music video teaser, gained popularity among netizens.

On February 9, 2012, the coaches of The Voice Korea, Kangta, Baek Ji Young, Gil, & Shin Seung Hoon performed a cover of Secret's "Magic". On February 10, 2012, the cover performance of "Magic" was aired in the pilot episode of The Voice Korea and was released digitally through various music portals in the following day.

== Track listing ==
| No. | Title | Lyrics | Music | Length |
|---|---|---|---|---|
| 1. | "My Boy" | Lee Sangin, Park Kyungwook | Lee Sangin | 3:55 |
| 2. | "Magic" | Kang Jiwon, Kim Kibum | Kang Jiwon, Kim Kibum, Shinsadong Tiger | 3:23 |
| 3. | "Spotlight" | Kang Jiwon, Kim Shiwoo | Kang Jiwon, Kim Shiwoo | 3:19 |
| 4. | "Do As You Please" | Hwang Sunjoon, Youngji | Djembeat, GL | 3:37 |
| 5. | "I Want You Back (Acoustic Version)" | Sohn Junghwan | Kang Jiwon | 3:54 |
| 6. | "3 Years, 6 Months (Acoustic Version)" | Kang Jiwon, Park Kyungwook | Kang Jiwon | 3:27 |
| Total length: | | | | 20:15 |

== Charts ==
=== Album chart ===
| Chart | Peak position |
|---|---|
| Gaon Weekly Album Chart | 4 |

=== Sales ===
| Chart | Sales |
|---|---|
| Gaon physical sales | 10,000+ (South Korea) |

== Credits and personnel ==
These credits were adapted from the Secret Time liner notes.

- Kim Tae-sung – executive producer co-producing
- Song Jieun – vocals
- Han Sunhwa – vocals
- Jun Hyoseong – vocals
- Jung Hana – vocals, rap
- Kang Jiwon – co-producing, songwriting, arranger, music
- Kim Kibum – co-producing, songwriting, music
- Shinsadong Tiger – co-producing, songwriting, music
