= Warrior (B.A.P song) =

Single by B.A.P

from the album Warrior
- Released: January 26, 2012
- Recorded: 2011–2012
- Genre: Conscious hip hop
- Length: 3:27
- Label: TS Entertainment
- Songwriters: Kang Ji-won, Kim Ki-bum, Bang Yong-guk
- Producers: Kang Ji-won, Kim Ki-bum

B.A.P Korean singles chronology
"Warrior" (2012)	"Secret Love" (2012)

"Warrior" (Korean: 워리어) is a song recorded by the South Korean boy group B.A.P. It was released as a digital single on January 26, 2012, by TS Entertainment. The song was B.A.P's first single and the first from their first EP, Warrior. "Warrior" was written and produced by Kang Ji-on and Kim Ki-bum, the same producers of Song Ji-eun's "Going Crazy" and Bang & Zelo's "Never Give Up". B.A.P's leader, Bang Yong-guk, co-wrote "Warrior". The song's lyrics describe the injustice of current society and the protagonist's desire to end it.

The choreography of "Warrior" was created by Park Sang-hyun who also choreographed Secret's "Magic", "Shy Boy" and "Starlight Moonlight". The song's music video was directed by Hong Won-ki. "Warrior" was lauded by various media outlets and netizens for its powerful and fierce imagery on its music video and live performances.

== Background and release ==
"When we decided the direction of our music, we promised not to make the same songs as others'. So we wrote "Warrior," thinking that it would be good to talk about some heavy issues that criticize the current society. We want to talk about various different issues in the future, as well."
—Kim Him Chan, discussing the conception of "Warrior"

On January 8, 2011, B.A.P aired its fictional documentary show entitled Ta-Dah It's B.A.P on SBS MTV. The documentary is based on the story of how six alien beings (B.A.P), who decide to become singers to dominate Earth, deal with adapting the life of a K-Pop idol. Early episodes of the show featured behind the scenes footage of B.A.P's recording session and music video set of "Warrior". On January 18, 2012, TS Entertainment announced that "Warrior" will be the name of their debut song. On January 19, 2012, TS Entertainment released the music video teaser for "Warrior". TS Entertainment wanted to debut B.A.P with a different musical direction unlike the "typical boy band route", thus coming up with the idea of dealing with the "heavy issues of our society". On March 26, 2012, B.A.P officially released "Warrior" on various online music sites. A representative from TS Entertainment described "Warrior" as "a feast of splendid and grand sound combined with heart-throbbing rap and vocals".

== Composition and theme ==
"Warrior" (B.A.P song)
A 25-second song sample. Backed by heavy synthesizers, heavy drums and whistles; B.A.P chants the chorus of "Warrior" with loud and aggressive vocals.

"Warrior" is the title track of B.A.P's first mini-album of the same name. "Warrior" is an uptempo hip hop song that runs for 3:29 (3 minutes, 29 seconds). The song was written and produced by Kang Ji-won and Kim Ki-bum, the same producers of Song Ji-eun's "Going Crazy" and Bang & Zelo's "Never Give Up". Additionally, B.A.P's leader, Bang Yong-guk co-wrote "Warrior". The song's lyrics describes the injustice of the current society and the protagonist's desire to end it. Kaylin Ro of Arirang Pop's in Seouls described "Warrior" "as a song in a new genre that blends the elements of krump and rock with an intense hip hop beat." Ro added that "it contains a powerful message, speaking on behalf of those who face numerous challenges in their daily lives, and the spectacular performance on stage is definitely eye-catching.

=== Image concept ===
The members all dyed their hair platinum blonde. They personally participated in their stage ensembles, their concept, as well as writing and producing their songs on the album to express their unique colors. Through OSEN, member Yoo Youngjae commented, "I like the platinum blonde look. All six of us are really unique, and we wanted to prevent ourselves from being too different, because we wanted a ‘team’ image on stage. Our company listens to our opinions, and Yong Guk hyung who wrote all the songs on our album is really serious and determined, as are the rest of us."

== Critical reception ==
"They've already proved what they're showing on the stage is very distinctive. Their perfect group dance, strong charisma, Bang Yong Guk's raw rap, and Zelo's high-speed rap are in perfect harmony. And Dae Hyun and Young Jae's great voices make their performance reach the climax. As befits their aggressive moves, their performances are very intense. Even top singing groups might have to pay attention to them."
—Yun Seong Yeol of Star News Korea, commenting on "Warrior's" live performance.

Tina Xu of MTV Korea commented, "'Warrior' features a gritty, industrial concept that clearly reflects the group’s hard, get-down-to-business image. We’re loving their no frills, simple style of black wifebeaters paired with classic Timberlands, which, thankfully, doesn’t take away from the colorful production’s graffiti-heavy setting. The song’s strong urban sound is further enhanced by some impressive breakdancing and step dance moves, making B.A.P quite the versatile group." Nancy Lee of Enews World commented "It appears [that] B.A.P has set out to differentiate itself among the pretty-boy male idol groups currently dominating the K-Pop world with a tough, bad boy image, smashing car windows, kicking up dirt and, you know, doing as boys do." iTunes wrote "The title track sounds like something straight out of Step Up 3D, with gigantic drums, walls of synths, and a whistle punctuating the whole song" Yun Seong Yeol of Star News Korea wrote, "The title song "Warrior" contains lyrics that criticize the current social system, which might be unfamiliar to many people who are used to today's friendly boy groups. Excluding all electronic sounds, which are often used in many K-pop songs, they highlight hip-hop beats". Seo Mi-Yeon of TV Report Korea wrote, "'Warrior' has a fast, strong beat and its fantastic stage performance leaves an impression. This song credits those who live in the darkness of suicide, violence at school and others by comparing them to warriors.

== Chart performance ==
On January 28, 2012, "Warrior" debuted at number fifty-four on the Gaon Music Chart. The following week, the song jumped ten places and peaked at number forty-four. On the Gaon Streaming Chart, "Warrior" debuted at number eighty-three and peaked at number fifty-one. On the Gaon Digital Chart the song debuted at number eighty-five and peaked at number forty-six. In Chart Korea the song debuted at number nineteen and peaked at number thirteen during the week of February 20, 2012.

== Promotions ==
B.A.P first performed "Warrior" on Music Bank on January 27, 2012, followed by a debut stage on Show! Music Core, on MTV's The Show and on Inkigayo. On January 28, 2012, B.A.P performed the song on their debut showcase in Seoul, when 3,000 fans attended the show. On February 23, 2012, TS Entertainment announced that B.A.P would end the promotion for "Warrior" and would promote "Secret Love" the following week.

Each member gave a different ending for each live performance. It began with the youngest, Zelo, who displayed a scene of being shot by the rest of the members. Next was Himchan who collapsed in the hands of leader Yongguk. During B.A.P's fourth week of performing "Warrior", the lead vocalist, Daehyun, ended the performance while during the most recent live performance, Yongguk delivered an electrifying ending.

== Music video ==
The shoot for the music video took place for a full four days on sets in Namyangju and Ilsan, and the video let loose the members' appeal and performances on a large-scale set. Director Hong Won-ki, who worked on videos for Girls' Generation's "The Boys", Seo Taiji's "Moai" and Beast's "Shock", directed the video.

== Track listing ==
Korean Single:

No.	Title	Length
1.	"워리어" (Warrior)	3:27
Total length:		3:27

== Credits and personnel ==
These credits were adapted from Warrior liner notes.

- Bang Yong-guk – vocals, rap, writing
- Zelo – vocals, rap
- Kim Him-chan – vocals
- Jung Dae-hyun – vocals
- Yoo Young-jae – vocals
- Moon Jong-up – vocals
- Kang Ji-won – writing, producing
- Kim Ki-bum – writing, producing

== Charts ==
Chart	Peak position
South Korea (Chart Korea)	13
South Korea (Gaon Singles Chart)	44
South Korea (Gaon Local Singles chart)	43
South Korea (Gaon Streaming Singles chart)	51
South Korea (Gaon Download Singles chart)	46
South Korea Billboard K-pop Hot 100	49

== Release history ==
Country	Date	Format	Label
Worldwide	January 26, 2012	Digital download	TS Entertainment
South Korea	January 26, 2012	Digital download	TS Entertainment
