= No Mercy (EP) =

B.A.P EP

EP by B.A.P
- Released: July 19, 2012
- Recorded: 2012
- Genre: K-pop, dance, hip hop, pop rock, R&B
- Length: 18:29
- Language: Korean
- Label: TS Entertainment
- Producer: Jeon Daun

B.A.P chronology
Power (2012)	No Mercy (2012)	Stop It (2012)

Singles from No Mercy
- 1. "Goodbye" Released: July 9, 2012; 2. "No Mercy" Released: July 18, 2012; 3. "Crash" Released: August 29, 2012

No Mercy is the first EP by South Korean male pop group B.A.P. It was released digitally on July 19, 2012, and physically on July 24, 2012, under the label of TS Entertainment. It features the singles "Goodbye" and "No Mercy".

On August 30, 2012, the repackaged version of the EP, renamed Crash, was digitally released. The repackage contained two new songs including "Crash" and "I Remember" (feat. Daehyun) along with the five previous tracks.

== Background and release ==
The title of the EP was revealed on July 12, 2012, along with the album cover and track listing. The album jacket photos of the individual members were released on July 15 and 16, 2012, which introduced the urban pop boy concept for the promotions.

The first single from the EP is a pop-rock ballad, "Goodbye". It features falsetto vocals and a strong rap. The song was composed by Jeon Daun, who also wrote G.NA's "Because You're My Person" and K.Will's "Struck Dumb", along with B.A.P member Yongguk. Yongguk also helped to pen the lyrics. "Goodbye" also featured guitarist TOP, who worked with Seo Taeji for over 10 years. The song and its music video were released digitally on July 9, 2012.

The second single, title track "No Mercy", is composed and produced by Marco and Jeon Daun of TS Entertainment. B.A.P member Yongguk helped with the lyrics. The rapping parts of the song utilizes the Gyeongsangdo dialect. It also makes use of "samul nori", a type of traditional Korean percussion music. This song is quite similar in comparison with group's previous singles "Warrior" and "Power", as it brings back many of the group's signature style, especially the use of whistles in the instrumental. The song was released digitally on July 18, 2012.

The No Mercy EP was released on July 19, 2012.

The repackaged version of the EP, entitled Crash (대박사건) and its title track were released on August 30, 2012. The song is the work of Duble Sidekick, and has a British rock base mixed with guitar sounds. It contains elements of pop rock, dance-rock and teen pop.

Non-promotional album track "Voicemail" is a hip hop-ballad song and the first by the group that is entirely written by member Yongguk. It integrates the use of phone sounds in the instrumental.

== Promotion ==
B.A.P made their first live broadcast appearance promoting the EP on the July 19, 2012 episode of M! Countdown. This was followed by appearances on Music Bank, Show! Music Core, Inkigayo.

The 49-second animated music video for the track "Goodbye" was released on July 9, 2012, through YouTube along with the digital release of the single. The video features the group's mascot concept of the Matoki alien species that crash-landed on Earth, explaining the mythical origin of the group. The jacket photo of "Goodbye" reminded fans of The Beatles' Abbey Road album art cover photo.

The music video for "No Mercy" was directed by Hong Won-ki of Zanybros, who is famously known for directing music videos for Seo Taeji, Super Junior, Girls' Generation, Secret and Beast. The video highlighted the change in looks of the group members from street gangsters to "pop boys" but keeping true to their upbeat artistry and charismatic image.

The music video for "Crash" was released on August 30, 2012, through the official YouTube channel of TS Entertainment. It features the clips of moments from the making of the music video for their last single, "No Mercy", and shooting of the jacket photos for the No Mercy and Crash EPs.

== Track listing ==
No.	Title	Lyrics	Music	Length
1.	"Goodbye"	Min Youngjae, Bang Yong-guk	Jeon Daun	4:04
2.	"No Mercy'"	Marco, Jeon Daun, Bang Yong-guk	Marco, Jeon Daun	3:33
3.	"Voice Message" (음성메시지)	Marco, Bang Yong-guk	Marco, Bang Yong-guk	3:28
4.	"Dancing In The Rain"	Park Suseok, iNoo, Lee Bailey, Tarmo Keranen	Lee Bailey, Tarmo Keranen	3:48
5.	"What My Heart Tells Me to Do" (마음이 시키는 일)	Kim Kibum	Kim Kibum	3:36
Total length:				18:29

Repackage: Crash
No.	Title	Lyrics	Music	Length
1.	"Crash" (대박사건)	Duble Sidekick, Bang Yong-guk	Duble Sidekick	2:55
2.	"I Remember" (Bang Yong-guk feat. Daehyun)	Bang Yong-guk, Chance, Twelve	Bang Yong-guk, Chance	3:42
3.	"Goodbye"	Min Youngjae, Bang Yong-guk	Jeon Daun	4:04
4.	"No Mercy"	Marco, Jeon Daun, Bang Yong-guk	Marco, Jeon Daun	3:33
5.	"Voice Message" (음성메시지)	Marco, Bang Yong-guk	Marco, Bang Yong-guk	3:28
6.	"Dancing in the Rain"	Park Suseok, iNoo, Lee Bailey, Tarmo Keranen	Lee Bailey, Tarmo Keranen	3:48
7.	"What My Heart Tells Me to Do" (마음이 시키는 일)	Kim Kibum	Kim Kibum	3:36
Total length:				25:06

== Release history ==
No Mercy was released digitally on July 19, 2012, under the label of TS Entertainment. The physical release was originally scheduled to be on July 19, 2012, as well but was delayed to July 24, 2012, because of the problems with the finished product. The special single "Goodbye" was released 10 days ahead of the album release whereas the lead single "No Mercy" was released on the same date as the album. On August 30, 2012, the repackaged version of the EP, renamed Crash, was released.

Album	Country	Date	Format	Label
No Mercy	South Korea	July 19, 2012	Digital	TS Entertainment
No Mercy	Worldwide	July 19, 2012	Digital	TS Entertainment
No Mercy	South Korea	July 24, 2012	CD	TS Entertainment
Crash	South Korea	August 30, 2012	Digital	TS Entertainment
Crash	Worldwide	August 30, 2012	Digital	TS Entertainment
