= Power (single album) =

Single album by B.A.P
- Released: April 27, 2012 (Digital Download); May 3, 2012 (CD)
- Recorded: 2012
- Genre: R&B, pop punk, hip hop
- Length: 13:01
- Label: TS Entertainment
- Producer: Kim Tae-Sung, Kang Jiwon, Kim Kibum

B.A.P chronology
Warrior (2012)	Power (2012)	No Mercy (2012)

Singles from Power
- 1. "Power" Released: April 27, 2012

Power is the second single album by South Korean boy band, B.A.P. It was released digitally on April 27, 2012, and contains four tracks. The lead single, "Power", was released the same day.

== Release and promotion ==
B.A.P released the EP Power and the music video for its lead single, "Power", on April 27, 2012, followed by promotions on music shows. A physical release of the EP occurred on May 3, 2012.

In the music video, B.A.P members portray more strength in their choreography and lyrics than in their debut song "Warrior". An 18-meter tall and 700-kilogram spaceship are visible in the video. The video was directed by Hong Won-ki of ZanyBros, who also directed their music video, "Warrior".

B.A.P first performed "Power" on Music Bank on April 27, 2012, followed by performances on Music Core, MTV's The Show, and SBS' Inkigayo.

== Composition ==
The lead single, "Power", is a dance-hip hop, rock song that runs for 3:49. "Power" was written and produced by Kang Ji Won and Kim Ki Bum with a strong hardcore rock and hiphop sound mixed to create a hardcore hiphop song that has a strong meaning, to fight against the people who try to get tyranny from money and strength. The duo also composed Song Jieun's "Going Crazy", Bang&Zelo's "Never Give Up" and their debut single, "Warrior". The song's lyrics tells the listener to rebel against injustice, fight against the idea that money and status are everything, and that the source of true power is within themselves.

The Power EP features 4 tracks in all, the titles of which all suggest a strong and aggressive theme. The EP musically follows a heavy rock and hip hop theme. Corynn Smith of MTV Korea wrote "“Power" does a great job of encompassing the single album's theme in its entirety. With titles like "Fight For Freedom," “What the Hell" and "All Lies," all four songs follow the title track's train of thought, which helps foster a fully cohesive concept." B.A.P's EP shows anger towards tyrants with strength and money, and has the meaning of giving strength to weaker people.

== Critical reception ==
Corynn Smith of MTV Korea wrote, "B.A.P proves once again why they are the top rookies this year with their new track and MV! Their signature aggressive vocal style and choreography is so intense that I was exhausted just watching them make this comeback. It’s a welcome change of pace from the back-to-back girl group releases that were fierce and fabulous, but didn’t quite make it into the “BOSS" category where these boys apparently live. B.A.P definitely has the "Power," and we can't get enough! The boys of B.A.P. are back with a bang and continue to rock their "strong and aggressive" style, complete with all the stomps, growls and sneers that captured the attention of fans back in January with their debut single "Warrior." Self-confident coupled with their undeniable sense of swagger elevates these rookies into a class all their own, and it's super obvious in the MV they released yesterday. Even the choreography for "Power" is totally swag: a blend of crumping, b-boy footwork and stepping set the sound and visual of the song’s message– rebellion– perfectly."

== Track listing ==
No.	Title	Lyrics	Music	Length
1.	"Fight For Freedom (Intro)"			1:25
2.	"Power"	Kang Jiwon, Kim Kibum, Bang Yongguk	Kang Jiwon, Kim Kibum	3:49
3.	"What the Hell"	Park Suseok, iNoo, Bang Yongguk	Park Suseok, iNoo	4:03
4.	"전부 거짓" (It's All Lies)	Kim Kibum, Bang Yongguk	Kim Kibum	3:42
Total length:				13:01

== Release history ==
Country	Date	Format	Label
South Korea	April 27, 2012	Digital	TS Entertainment
Worldwide	April 27, 2012	Digital	TS Entertainment
South Korea	May 3, 2012	CD	TS Entertainment

== Personnel ==
These credits were adapted from the Power (EP) liner notes.

- Bang Yong-guk – vocals, rap, songwriting
- Choi Jun-hong (Zelo) – vocals, rap
- Jung Dae-hyun – vocals
- Yoo Young-jae – vocals
- Kim Him-chan – vocals
- Moon Jong-up – vocals
- Kang Jiwon – producer, songwriting, music
- Kim Kibum – producer, songwriting, music
