= Secret Love (B.A.P song) =

Single by B.A.P

from the album Warrior
- Released: March 1, 2012
- Recorded: 2011–2012
- Genre: Latin, hip hop, R&B
- Length: 3:27
- Label: TS Entertainment
- Songwriters: Bang Yong Guk, Kang Ji Won
- Producers: Kang Jiwon, LOPTOMIST

B.A.P Korean singles chronology
"Warrior" (2012)	"Secret Love" (2012)	"Power" (2012)

"Secret Love" (Korean: 비밀연애) is a song recorded by South Korean idol group B.A.P. It is released as a Digital single on March 3, 2012, through TS Entertainment. The song was released as a promotional single for their mini-album, Warrior EP. The song was written by Bang Yong Guk and Kang Jiwon; and features vocals from Song Jieun. The music video for "Secret Love" contained behind the scenes footage of B.A.P's "Warrior" and Bang&Zelo's "Never Give Up", and it served as a tribute video for their fans.

== Background and release ==
After B.A.P ended the promotion for "Warrior", TS Entertainment announced that they will have follow-up promotional single in March with "Secret Love". The song features label mate Song Jieun of Secret. On February 27, TS Entertainment revealed, "Following B.A.P's performance of Warrior on the February 26 episode of SBS’ Inkigayo, the members will begin promotions for Secret Love later this week and shed their tough masculine image to display a new side to them." The agency added, "We contemplated quite a lot on which track we should follow up to Warrior off B.A.P's debut album and since we wanted to show a new side of the group we decided on Secret Love."

"B.A.P has concluded their promotions for their debut track ‘Warrior’ through ‘Inkigayo’ yesterday[February 26] and will begin their follow-up track ‘Secret Love’ starting this week. We will be showing a 180 degree transformation of the boys through ‘Secret Love’… We had a hard time deciding on which song to follow-up with but ended up choosing ‘Secret Love’ in order to show a whole different image of B.A.P to fans." —TS Entertainment, discussing on B.A.P's follow-up promotion with "Secret Love".

The song served only as a promotional single with its music video being filmed with behind the scenes footage of "Warrior" and "Never Give Up". It also serves as a tribute video to their fans.

== Composition and theme ==
"Secret Love" (B.A.P song)
A 22-second song sample of the first chorus, featuring guitar instrumentation and drum beats. It also incorporates an intricate melodic phrasing.

"Secret Love" is a promotional single from B.A.P's first mini-album, Warrior. "Secret Love" is a R&B, Hip-Hop song with influences from Latin. The song runs for 3:27 (3 minutes, 27 seconds). It was written by Bang Yong Guk and Kang Jiwon; and produced by Kang Jiwon and LOPTOMIST. The song features the vocals of label mate Song Jieun of Secret, taking the lyrics of the female part. The song lyrically tells the sad love story from the perspective of a celebrity and how they have to hold secret relationships.

=== Critical reception ===
iTunes wrote, "Short for Best Absolute Perfect, BAP is a Korean boy band, and Warrior is its debut EP[....]The real standout here is "Secret Love," where the beats mellow out enough to actually hear the members rapping. It's set to boom-baps, chill acoustic guitar strumming, and smooth singing from Secret's Song Ji Eun."

== Promotions ==
=== Chart performance ===
"Secret Love" peaked at number 132 on the Gaon Charts during March 10, 2012. It fared well on the Gaon Online BGM chart, entering at the top 20 while peaking at number 17. The song also charted on the Gaon Mobile Chart at number 81.

=== Live performances ===
"Secret Love" was first performed on B.A.P's debut showcase in Seoul on January 28, 2012. On Korean music shows, B.A.P first performed "Secret Love" on M! Countdown, on March 1, 2012. The group also performed "Secret Love" on Music Bank on March 2. They also performed the song on Music Core, MTV's The Show, Inkigayo and Music on Top.

== Music video ==
=== Background ===
As a gift to their fans, TS Entertainment issued a music video for "Secret Love" on March 1, 2012. The video contains various behind the scenes footage from photo shoots, live performances, and their music video recording, such as in "Warrior", Bang&Zelo's "Never Give Up" and footage from their debut showcase on January 28, 2012.

=== Ta-Dah It's B.A.P cut version ===
B.A.P's new reality program titled ‘Ta-Da, It's B.A.P‘ aired its 8th episode on February 26, where they revealed the making of their music video for "Secret Love". In the music video, member Him Chan displayed his acting skills by taking the role of a man who's unable to express his love to a girl. However the music video never came in fruition as it was only intended for the show. TS Entertainment released a different music video for the song and it served as a tribute video for their fans.

== Track listing ==
Korean single

No.	Title	Length
1.	"비밀연애" (Secret Love)	3:27
Total length:		3:27

== Credits and personnel ==
These credits were adapted from the Warrior (EP) liner notes.

- Bang Yong Guk – vocals, rap, songwriting
- Choi Jun Hong (Zelo) – vocals, rap
- Jung Dae Hyun – vocals
- Yoo Young Jae – vocals
- Kim Him Chan – vocals
- Moon Jong Up – vocals
- Kang Jiwon – producer, songwriting, music
- Loptomist – producer, music

== Charts ==
Chart	Peak position
Gaon Singles Chart	132
Gaon Online BGM Chart	17
Gaon Mobile Ringtone Chart	81

== Release history ==
Country	Date	Format	Label
Worldwide	March 1, 2012	Digital download	TS Entertainment
South Korea	March 1, 2012	Digital download	TS Entertainment
