= I Remember (Bang Yong-guk and Yang Yo-seob song) =

Bang Yong-guk and Yang Yo-seob song

- The cover art displays the initial romanization of Bang's name

Single by Bang Yong-guk and Yang Yo-seob of Beast
- Language: Korean
- Released: August 12, 2011
- Genre: Hip hop
- Length: 3:39
- Label: TS
- Songwriters: Bang Yong-guk; Chance; Twelve

Bang Yong-guk singles chronology
"Going Crazy" (2011)	"I Remember" (2011)	"Never Give Up" (2011)

Yang Yo-seob singles chronology
"First Snow and First Kiss" (2010)	"I Remember" (2011)	"No" (2011)

"I Remember" is a song recorded by South Korean rapper Bang Yong-guk and vocalist Yang Yo-seob of Beast. It was released on August 12, 2011, by TS Entertainment and distributed by Kakao M. Following his collaboration with Song Ji-eun on "Going Crazy" earlier that year, Bang made his formal debut as a soloist ahead of the launch of the record label's boy group B.A.P.

A duet, "I Remember" is a hip hop track with elements of rock. Due to the music video's display of graphic violence, the Korean Broadcasting System (KBS) deemed it ineligible to be aired on its network. The single peaked at number 22 on South Korea's national Gaon Digital Chart and sold over 430,000 downloads domestically.

== Background and composition ==
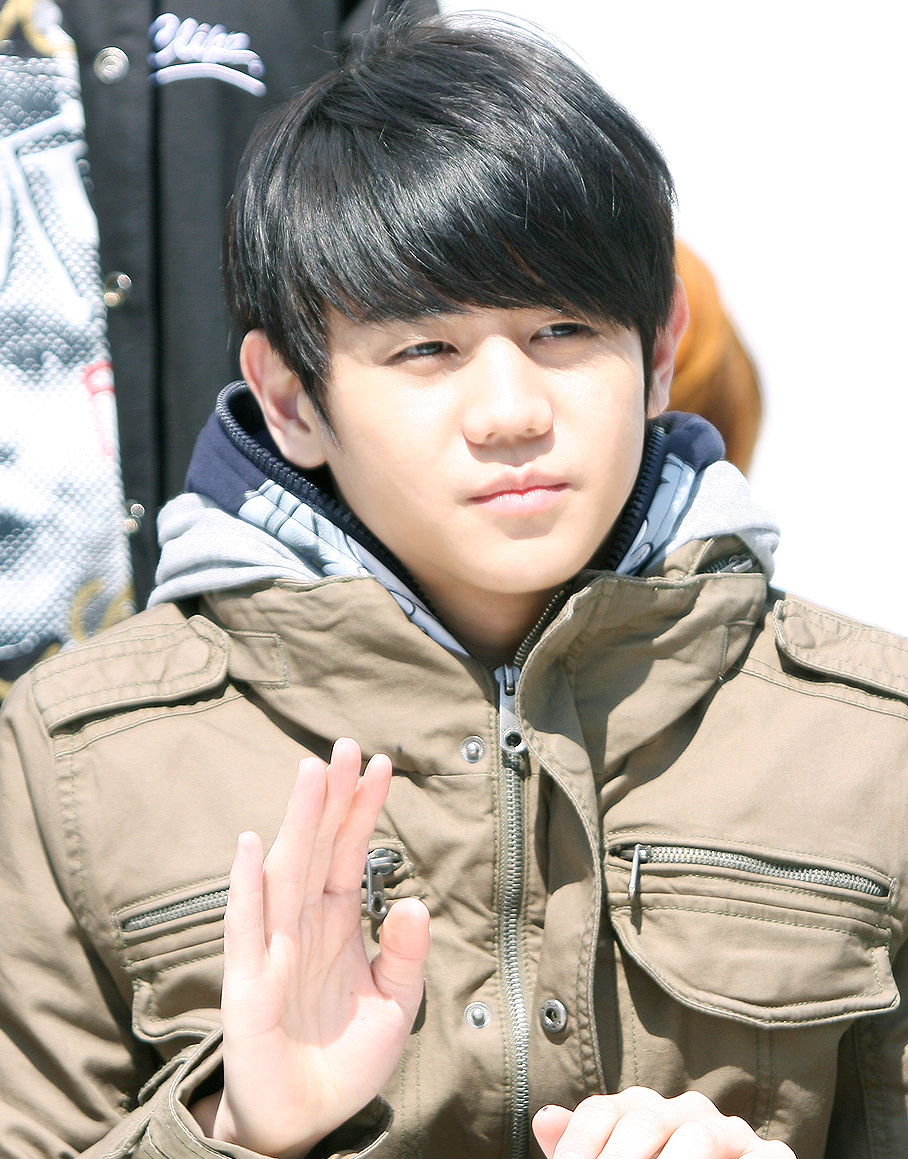
"I Remember" was recorded as a duet with Yang Yo-seob

Bang was introduced as a new rapper signed to TS Entertainment who guest featured on Song Ji-eun's single "Going Crazy" in March 2011. Leading up to the release of "I Remember", Bang was revealed to be a member of the agency's upcoming boy group B.A.P. An "emotional" hip hop song with elements of rock music, it was sung as a duet with Yang Yo-seob of Beast. The music was written by Bang, Chance of One Way, and Twelve. "I Remember" is written in the key of D-flat major and has a tempo of 85 beats per minute. The song was re-recorded with bandmate Daehyun in place of Yang's vocals and included on B.A.P's repackaged mini-album Crash (2012).

== Release and promotion ==
On July 29, 2011, Bang uploaded a selfie via Twitter pictured with Yang with the caption "Coming soon", alluding to the forthcoming release of "I Remember". Bang lost 5 kilograms (11 lb) ahead of the single's released to shed the perception of being a "smiley boy" and portray a manlier look. On the eve of the single's release, music video teaser images showcasing Bang with red hair and "thick, smoky" makeup was posted. A 40-second music video teaser for "I Remember" was uploaded at midnight on the day of the single's release; the full version was uploaded later that day. Actor Park Seo-joon made a cameo in the music video. Bang performed the track along with Daehyun at B.A.P's debut showcase on January 28, 2012.

== Commercial performance ==
On the chart dated August 7–13, 2011, "I Remember" debuted at number 37 on South Korea's national Gaon Digital Chart. The following week, it rose to its peak rank at 22. The single ranked within the top 100 for three consecutive weeks. By the end of the month, the single sold 430,250 downloads domestically.

== Critical reception ==
Writing for online magazine IZM, Jo E-seul rated "I Remember" two and a half out of five stars and wrote that the song's rock elements that were intended to emphasize Bang's deep voice led to disharmony between the rapper and Yang's vocals. Jo said that the track "isn't bad", but lacks "distinctive characteristics". The Korean Broadcasting System banned the music video for "I Remember" from syndication on its network. The company deemed the portrayal of violence and a shooting as "excessive".

== Track listing ==
Track listing
No.	Title	Lyrics	Music	Arrangement	Length
1.	"I Remember"	Bang Yong-guk, Chance, Twelve	Bang Yong-guk, Chance	Chance	3:39
2.	"I Remember" (Inst.)		Bang Yong-guk, Chance	Chance	3:39
Total length:					7:18

== Charts ==
Chart (2011)	Peak position
Gaon Digital Chart	22
Gaon Bell Chart	93
Gaon Ring Chart	97
