= Yang Yo-seob discography =

- Studio albums: 1
- EPs: 3
- Singles: 6
- Collaborations: 14
- Soundtrack appearances: 16
- Music Videos: 4

The discography of South Korean singer-songwriter, musical actor Yang Yo-seob consists of one studio album, three extended plays and six singles.

== Studio albums ==
Title	Details	Peak chart positions	Sales
Title	Details	KOR	Sales
Chocolate Box	Released: September 20, 2021; Label: Around Us Entertainment, RCA Records, Kakao Entertainment; Formats: CD, digital download	3	KOR: 76,494

== Extended plays ==
Title	Details	Peak chart positions	Sales
Title	Details	KOR	Sales
The First Collage	Released: November 26, 2012; Label: Cube Entertainment; Formats: CD, digital download	3	KOR: 55,817; JPN: 10,757
White	Released: February 19, 2018; Label: Around Us Entertainment, RCA Records, LOEN Entertainment; Formats: CD, digital download	1	KOR: 58,535
Unloved Echo	Released: February 9, 2026; Label: Around Us Entertainment; Formats: CD, digital download	6	KOR: 43,190

== Singles ==
=== As lead artist ===
Title	Year	Peak chart positions	Sales (DL)	Album
Title	Year	KOR	Sales (DL)	Album
"Caffeine" (카페인)	2012	2	KOR: 1,606,049	The First Collage
"Although I" (그래도 나는)	2012	50	KOR: 67,942	The First Collage
"Star" (별)	2018	43	—N/a	White
"Where I Am Gone" (네가 없는 곳)	2018	22	—N/a	White
"With You"	2019	173	—N/a	20 Full Moons
"Brain"	2021	68	—N/a	Chocolate Box
"Fade Away"	2026	—	—N/a	Unloved Echo

=== Collaborations ===
Title	Year	Peak chart positions	Sales	Album
Title	Year	KOR	Sales	Album
"Thanks To" (with Junhyung)	2010	46	—N/a	My Story
"First Snow and First Kiss" (with Daniel Chae)	2010	—	—N/a	Non-album single
"I Remember" (with Bang Yong-guk)	2011	22	KOR: 430,250	Non-album single
"Love Day" (with Eunji)	2012	8	KOR: 1,604,167	Non-album single
"Tearfully Beautiful" (with Dramatic BLUE)	2012	16	KOR: 217,009	Non-album single
"When I Get Paid" (with Prepix)	2013	56	KOR: 66,312	Look to Listen
"Perfume" (with Cube Girls)	2013	22	KOR: 172,881	Non-album single
"From Where and Until Where" (with HyunA)	2014	—	KOR: 21,150	A Talk
"Small Moon" (with Ryu Hyun-Jin, Eunkwang, Gayoon, Shin Ji-hoon)	2014	80	KOR: 21,898	Non-album single
"If You Come into My Heart" (with Jo Sumi)	2015	—	—N/a	I.Miss.You
"Story" (with Richard Parkers)	2016	67	KOR: 34,071	Non-album single
"Universe" (with Yoo Jaehwan, Dongwoon)	2017	—	KOR: 14,472	Universe
"Aspirin" (with Yoon Ddan Ddan)	2018	—	—N/a	Sugar Man 2 Part.4
"We Are Connected" (with Sandeul and Jung Seunghwan)	2018	—	—N/a	Non-album single
"Unforgettable Love" (연모(戀慕))	2023	139	—N/a	My Dearest OST Part 5
"—" denotes releases that did not chart or were not released in that region.

=== As featured artist ===
Title	Year	Peak chart positions	Sales	Album
Title	Year	KOR	Sales	Album
"Tükk" (Primary feat. Yoseob)	2017	61	KOR: 35,602	Pop
"Adorable" (Ravi feat. Yoseob)	2018	—	—N/a	Non-album single

=== Soundtrack appearances ===
Title	Year	Peak chart positions	Sales	Album
Title	Year	KOR	Sales	Album
"Happy Birthday"	2010	—	—N/a	Charming by the Day OST
"Loving You" (with Doojoon, Hyunseung)	2010	64	—N/a	All My Love OST
"Cherish That Person"	2011	36	—N/a	My Princess OST
"No"	2011	10	KOR: 466,241	Poseidon OST
"Dreaming" (with Junhyung, Dongwoon)	2011	39	KOR: 395,159	Me Too, Flower! OST
"Be Alright" (with Gayoon, Changseob, G.NA)	2012	93	KOR: 37,281	Road For Hope OST
"Bye Bye Love" (with Dongwoon, BTOB)	2013	35	KOR: 133,418	When a Man Falls in Love OST
"Wish" (with Gayoon)	2014	82	KOR: 27,106	The Night Watchman's Journal OST
"Why Don't You Know"	2015	49	KOR: 38,589	Let's Eat 2 OST
"Without You" (with Doojoon, Dongwoon)	2015	62	KOR: 50,103	Scholar Who Walks the Night OST
"A Move of God"	2017	68	KOR: 24,576	Hwarang: The Poet Warrior Youth OST
"The Man That Couldn't Cry"	2017	77	KOR: 27,015	The Emperor: Owner of the Mask OST
"The Tree"	2017	—	KOR: 15,338	The Emperor: Owner of the Mask OST
"Silent Cry"	2018	—	—N/a	Come and Hug Me OST
"On the Road"	2018	89	—N/a	RE:Playlist OST
"Still Me"	2018	—	—N/a	Let's Eat 3 OST
"Even Now" (아직도 좋아해)	2022	94	—N/a	Our Beloved Summer OST
"—" denotes releases that did not chart or were not released in that region.

== Other charted songs ==
Title	Year	Peak chart positions	Sales	Album
Title	Year	KOR	Sales	Album
"Just Do As You Always Did"	2013	43	KOR: 79,733	The First Collage
"You Don't Know"	2013	47	KOR: 70,922	The First Collage
"Look At Me"	2013	54	KOR: 62,074	The First Collage
"Come Out"	2016	54	KOR: 39,471	Highlight

== Music Videos ==
Year	Title	Length
2012	Caffeine	3:41
2013	Although I	4:08
2018	Star	4:06
2018	Where I Am Gone	3:34
