= Warrior (single album) =

Single album by B.A.P
- Released: January 26, 2012 (Digital download); February 2, 2012 (CD)
- Recorded: 2011–2012
- Genre: Hip hop, K-pop, Latin, R&B
- Length: 11:38 (11 minutes, 38 seconds)
- Label: TS Entertainment
- Producer: Kim Tae-Sung, Kang Jiwon, Kim Kibum

B.A.P chronology
Warrior (2012)	Power (2012)

Singles from Warrior
- 1. "Warrior" Released: January 26, 2012; 2. "Secret Love" Released: March 1, 2012

Warrior is the first single album by South Korean boy band B.A.P. The single album was released digitally on January 26, 2012, and contains four tracks. The accompanying CD of Warrior was released on February 2, 2012, when the album sold 10,000 copies in two days upon its release. The album also debuted on Billboard's World Albums Chart at number 10. The lead single, "Warrior", was released on January 26, 2012, through various online digital stores. In March 2012, B.A.P released a follow-up single, "Secret Love". The single album peaked at number three on the Gaon Album Chart.

== Background and promotion ==
On January 16, 2012, TS Entertainment revealed the jacket photos of Bang Yong-guk and Jung Dae-hyun, thus revealing the latter as the fourth member. The following day, jacket photos of Zelo and Moon Jong-up were released, and revealed the latter as the fifth member. On January 19, 2012, jacket photos of Kim Him-chan and Yoo Young-jae were released, and revealed the latter as the final member. The same day, they also released the music video teaser for their debut single, "Warrior" with TS Entertainment saying that "it carries a powerful flavor that will help bring out a fierce performance from B.A.P." TS Entertainment also announced that the title track, "Warrior", was composed by Kang Jiwon and Kim Kibum, whose previous works include Secret's "Magic", "Madonna", "Shy Boy", "Starlight Moonlight", as well as Bang & Zelo's "Never Give Up". The group started promoting "Warrior" on KBS's Music Bank on January 27, 2012. "Burn it Up" was used as the introduction song for their debut stage in music show programs. The group also performed all the tracks of Warrior (EP) on their debut showcase held in Seoul, South Korea which was attended by 3,000 people. In March 2012, B.A.P released a follow-up promotional single, "Secret Love".

== Critical reception ==
iTunes wrote "Short for Best Absolute Perfect, BAP is a Korean boy band, and Warrior is its debut EP. While the group's breakneck rapping and over-the-top imagery (check out the video) set it apart from the typical ballad-centric K-Pop offerings, BAP is most definitely a boy band, complete with matching dyed-blond hair and ultra-sleek production. The title track sounds like something straight out of Step Up 3D, with gigantic drums, walls of synths, and a whistle punctuating the whole song. "Unbreakable" flaunts more of an R&B vibe, set to skittering snares and subdued claps. The real standout here is "Secret Love," where the beats mellow out enough to actually hear the members rapping. It's set to boom-baps, chill acoustic guitar strumming, and smooth singing from Secret's Song Ji-eun."

== Chart performance ==
On February 2, 2012, Warrior was released on various music stores in South Korea. The single album peaked at number three on the Gaon Album Chart and peaked at number ten on the Gaon Monthly Album Chart. The album sold 10,000 copies in just two days upon its release. The album also debuted on Billboard's World Albums Chart at number 10. As of March 2012, Warrior has sold over 23,821 copies in South Korea.

== Singles ==
"Warrior" served as B.A.P's debut single, the first from their self-titled debut album. "Warrior" debuted at number fifty-four on the Gaon Chart and peaked at number forty-four. "Warrior" was lauded by various media outlets and netizens for its powerful and fierce imagery on its music video and live performances. The song was written and produced by Kang Ji-won and Kim Ki-bum, the same composer of Song Ji-eun's "Going Crazy" and Bang&Zelo's "Never Give Up". Additionally, B.A.P's leader, Bang Yong-guk, co-wrote "Warrior". Kaylin Ro of Arirang Pop's in Seouls described "Warrior" "as a song in a new genre that blends the elements of krump and rock with an intense hip hop beat." Ro added that "it contains a powerful message, speaking on behalf of those who face numerous challenges in their daily lives, and the spectacular performance on stage is definitely eye-catching. The song's lyrics describes the injustice of the current society and the protagonist's desire to end it.

After B.A.P ended the promotion for "Warrior", TS Entertainment announced that they will have follow-up promotional single in March with "Secret Love". The song features label mate Song Ji-eun of Secret and is written and produced by Bang Yong-guk, Kang Ji-won and Loptomist. On February 27, TS Entertainment revealed, "Following B.A.P’s performance of Warrior on the February 26 episode of SBS’ Inkigayo, the members will begin promotions for Secret Love later this week and shed their tough masculine image to display a new side to them." The agency added, "We contemplated quite a lot on which track we should follow up to Warrior off B.A.P’s debut album and since we wanted to show a new side of the group we decided on Secret Love." The song tells the sad love story from the perspective of a celebrity and how they have to hold secret relationships. The song served only as a promotional single with its music video being filmed with behind the scenes footage of "Warrior" and "Never Give Up". It also serves as a tribute video to their fans.

== Track listing ==
No.	Title	Lyrics	Music	Length
1.	"Burn It Up (Intro)"	Bang Yong-guk, Kim Ki-bum, Marco	Kim Ki-bum, Marco	1:18
2.	"Warrior"	Bang Yong-guk, Kang Ji-won, Kim Ki-bum	Kang Ji-won, Kim Ki-bum	3:26
3.	"Unbreakable"	Bang Yong-guk, Kang Ji-won	Dani	3:15
4.	"Secret Love" (비밀연애; Bimil Yeonae) (featuring Song Ji-eun of Secret)	Bang Yong-guk, Kang Ji-won	Kang Ji-won, Loptomist	3:39
Total length:				11:38

== Charts ==
Chart (2012)	Peak position
Billboard World Albums Chart	10
Gaon Album Chart (weekly)	3
Gaon Album Chart (monthly)	10

=== Sales ===
Chart	Sales
Gaon physical sales	42,261+

== Release history ==
Country	Date	Format	Label
South Korea	January 26, 2012	Digital	TS Entertainment
Various	January 26, 2012	Digital	TS Entertainment
South Korea	February 2, 2012	CD	TS Entertainment
