= Aight =

Jung Dae-hyun single album

Single album by Jung Dae-hyun
- Released: October 11, 2019
- Genre: Dance
- Length: 6:05
- Language: Korean
- Labels: STX Lionheart; Genie Music
- Producer: Park Choong-min (exec.)

Jung Dae-hyun chronology
Chapter2 "27" (2019)	Aight (2019)	행로 (行路) (2025)

Singles from Aight
- 1. "Aight" Released: October 11, 2019

Aight is the first single album by South Korean singer Jung Dae-hyun. It was released on October 11, 2019, by STX Lionheart and distributed by Genie Music. Having released a ballad record earlier in the year, Jung wanted to further his transition from an idol to a singer-songwriter and "all-rounder solo artist". He conceived the genre, concept, and ambiance of the project, which culminated into a dance album.

Following a series of photo and video teasers, Aight and its lead single of the same name were concurrently released. Jung held a showcase for the single album and he promoted the song by performing it on music chart programs across various television networks. Aight peaked at number 15 on South Korea's national Gaon Album Chart, shifting over 4,600 units domestically since its release.

== Background and music structure ==
Jung signed with STX Lionheart in June 2019, two months after releasing his debut mini-album Chapter2 "27" and accompanying ballad lead single. With Aight, he wanted to synchronize dance, music, and performance, which led him to re-adopt his B.A.P image and concept as a dance singer. Jung decided on the album's genre, concept, and ambiance. Seeking to develop his musical spectrum, Jung engaged in rap, performance, lyrics, and composition. He took interest in rapping as a result of being surrounded by rappers and decided to take lessons of the technique. Jung described his vocals on previous albums with his group as containing "many high notes", contrasting it with the newly recorded music that is "easier to listen to". The record further demonstrates his transition from an idol to a singer-songwriter and "all-rounder solo artist".

The title Aight is an English slang word for "alright" used to express a positive sentiment. A dance album, it opens with the title track, a newtro funk and dance song. It incorporates a "rhythmical" bassline, a funky guitar, and synthesizers. The lyrics revolve around a woman the narrator loves. It was penned by Kim Ki-beom, who had previously worked with Jung when writing songs for B.A.P. The single's choreography was conceived by choreographer Waackxxxy and Jung, which consists of waacking, slow motion, and dancing which simulates zero-gravity walking on an alien planet. The song was re-recorded and choreography modified three times each. On the second track, Jung contributed to the songwriting of "Bomb". It expresses his message of energy and consolation to workers who face an onslaught of work. Jung began crafting the song prior to working on Aight and, finding inspiration from his fans, he intended to dedicate a "bright" song to them.

== Artwork concept ==
The cover art concept of Aight is outer space. The theme was chosen to liken the size of space to Jung's musical capacity. It compromises illustrations of rockets, airplanes, and planets set against a mint-colored gradient background. It also includes an Iris flower which stands for "the only love", a rabbit that symbolizes B.A.P's fandom, fireworks which signify the celebration of a new beginning, and a flock of birds that represent his fans. Jung is portrayed as an astronaut wearing a pink spacesuit, which replicates the color of his Kekemato bunny mascot from B.A.P. The suit contains a depiction of Ganji, Jung's pet Bichon Frise. It also bears the numbers "2-1" which denote part one of his second chapter as a soloist and the letters "J/L" for Jung Dae-hyun and Lionheart. The album photography was shot my Moke Na-jung. It shows Jung with a "natural" look, which he described as "mostly dreamy and fantasy-like".

== Release and promotion ==
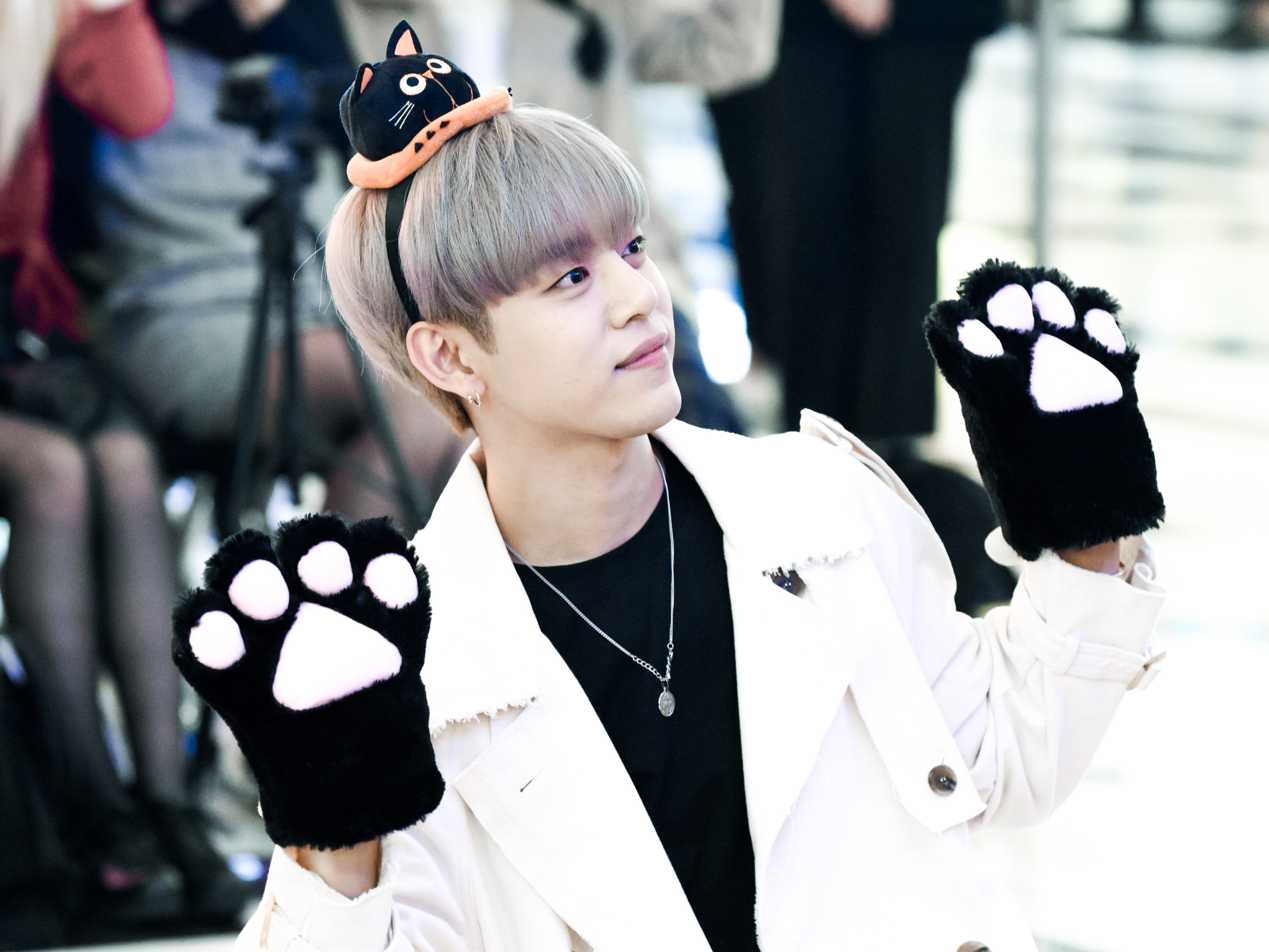
Jung during an Aight album signing event, October 20, 2019

On September 27, STX Lionheart issued a promotion schedule leading up to the release of Jung's first single album Aight. Seven concept photos were simultaneously released September 30, with an additional six on the consecutive day. A highlight medley of the record was uploaded on October 4. An initial music video teaser was published on October 7, followed by a second two days later. Directed by Lee Gi-baek, the music video for the lead single "Aight" was posted on October 11 at midnight. The eponymous single album was released twelve hours later.

One day prior to the release of Aight, Jung held a showcase for the single album at the MUV Hall in the Mapo District in Seoul. He also began promoting "Aight" that day. He performed the single on Mnet's M Countdown. Jung made additional performances on Munhwa Broadcasting Corporation's (MBC) Show! Music Core, SBS MTV's The Show, and MBC Music's Show Champion. He also made appearances on radio shows SBS Power FM's Cultwo Show and MBC Standard FM's Idol Radio to promote the album. Jung concluded promotions for the record on November 2.

== Commercial performance ==
On the chart dated October 6–12, 2019, Aight debuted at number 15 on South Korea's national Gaon Album Chart. By the end of the month, the single album shifted 4,648 units domestically.

== Track listing ==
Aight
No.	Title	Lyrics	Music	Arrangement	Length
1.	"Aight" (아잇; Ait)	Kim Ki-beom, Jacoby	Kim Ki-beom, Jacoby	Kim Ki-beom, Jacoby	2:54
2.	"Bomb" (느낌있게; Neukkim Itge)	Jung Dae-hyun, W.E	Jung Dae-hyun, W.E, Lee Su-a, Yu Yeong-bin	Lee Su-a, Yu Yeong-bin, W.E	3:11
Total length:					6:05

== Credits ==
Credits adapted from the single album's liner notes.

- Hyeon Hye-won – stylist
- Jacoby – arranger, bassist, chorus, composer, drummer, lyricist, programmer, synthesizer
- Jung Dae-hyun – chorus, composer, lyricist, programmer
- Jung Jae-pil – guitarist, slap bassist, recording engineer
- Jung Si-yeon – choreography
- Kang Seong-mo – design and art
- Kim Ki-beom – arranger, chorus, composer, lyricist
- Kim Min-hee – recording engineer
- Kwon Nam-woo – mastering engineer
- Lee Su-a – arranger, composer, drummer, synthesizer
- Mi-rin – hair
- Moke Na-jung – photography
- No Woo-seok – making photo
- Park Choong-min – executive producer, producer
- Park Seo-hyeon – guitarist
- Park Seon-yeong – recording engineer
- Son Eun-ji – make-up, stylist
- Seung-jin – hair
- Taltsy – mixing engineer
- W.E – arranger, chorus, composer, lyricist, programmer
- Yang Hye-yeong – make-up
- Yu Yeong-bin – arranger, composer

== Chart ==
Chart (2019)	Peak position
South Korean Albums (Gaon)	15
