= Jung Dae-hyun =

South Korean singer and actor (born 1993)

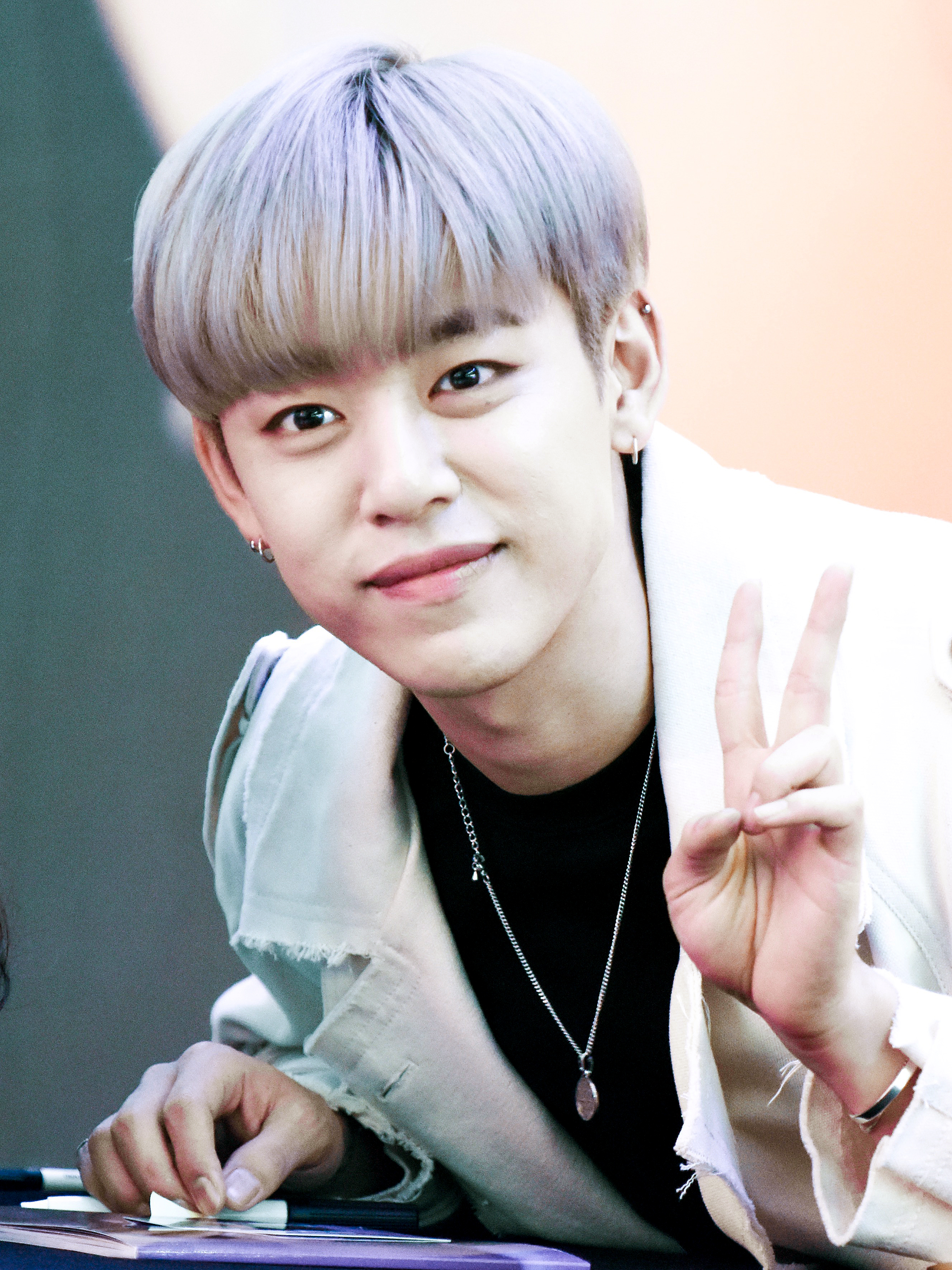
- Jung during an Aight album signing event, October 2019
- Born: June 28, 1993 (age 33); Gwangju, South Jeolla Province, South Korea
- Occupations: Singer; actor
- Musical career
- Genre: K-pop
- Instrument: Vocals
- Years active: 2012–present
- Labels: TS; STX Lionheart; MA
- Member of: B.A.P

Korean name
- Hangul: 정대현
- Hanja: 鄭大賢
- RR: Jeong Daehyeon
- MR: Chŏng Taehyŏn

Jung Dae-hyun (Korean: 정대현; born June 28, 1993), also known mononymously as Daehyun, is a South Korean singer and actor. He debuted as an idol in the six-member group B.A.P under TS Entertainment, where he served as the main vocalist from 2012 to its dissolution in 2019. Following his departure from TS Entertainment, he released his debut mini-album Chapter2 "27" in April 2019. Jung has ventured into musical theater since being cast for Napoleon in 2017.

== Early life ==
Jung was born on June 28, 1993, in Gwangju, South Jeolla Province. The second and younger son of his hardware store-owning father and mother, he lived in a wealthy household. He aspired to become a singer after watching TVXQ and he began to sing as a child. While enrolled in kindergarten, the 1997 Asian financial crisis drove his family into poverty. Jung and his family moved to Busan, where he attended elementary and middle school. He stopped singing amidst worries of his career in his third year of middle school. After abandoning the idea to attend an arts high school with expensive tuition payments, Jung applied to an institution with a "practical" music department and was accepted. During his second year in high school, he went to a youth training center where he practiced vocalizing and learned b-boying. Upon a suggestion from a friend, Jung enrolled in a hagwon in the Haeundae District where he received specialized training; he attended for approximately one year.

== Career ==
=== Career beginnings and B.A.P ===
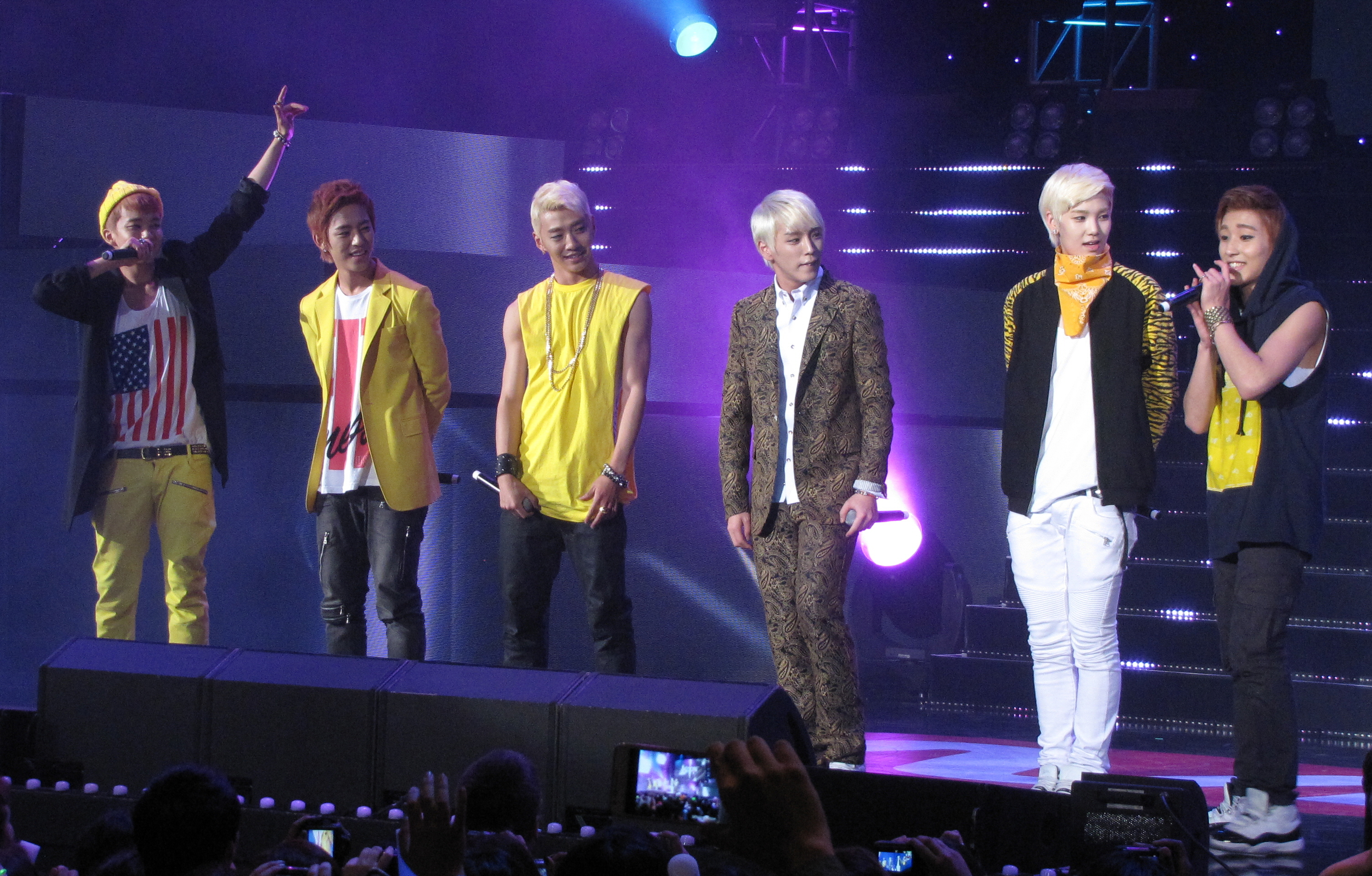
B.A.P at KCON 2012

Jung learned about auditions being held by agency TS Entertainment in Busan and he was scheduled to take part, but decided to perform at a competition during that time and was ranked second place. The record label contacted him for another opportunity and he traveled to Seoul for the audition. On his train ride back to Busan, he received his notice of acceptance. He was a trainee under the company for six months.

Jung was revealed as a member of idol sextet B.A.P on January 16, 2012, where he served as the main vocalist. The group debuted ten days later with its single album Warrior. In November 2014, the group filed a lawsuit against its agency. The members sought to nullify its contract with the company citing "unfair conditions and profit distribution". In August of the following year, the two parties ultimately settled and B.A.P resumed its activities under TS Entertainment. In August and December 2018, Yongguk and Zelo left the group and record label following the expiration of their contracts, respectively. Jung and the remaining three members left the agency in February 2019, leading the dissolution of B.A.P.

=== As a soloist ===
In March 2019, Jung initiated a crowdfunding campaign with the company Culture Bridge to acquire funds for his debut mini-album. He was criticized for the costs of the benefits provided to patrons who contributed between ₩200,000–₩500,000 (US$174.83–$437.08), which were deemed "excessive". He was compared to former bandmate Yongguk, who was preparing a "musically ambitious" solo album at the time without crowdfunding, which was perceived as "authentic". Jung sympathized with his fans and lamented partaking in crowdfunding. Chapter2 "27" was released on April 5. Jung—who no longer identifies as an idol—contributed to the lyrics, composition, and production of the record. Jung signed with agency STX Lionheart two months later. Under the company, he released his first single album Aight and its title track on October 11.

Jung was cast for the musical Grease, where he played the lead role of Danny. The production ran from November 2019 to February 2020. He contributed a song entitled "All Things Will Pass" on the original soundtrack for JTBC's television series Sweet Munchies. Jung was cast in the musical The Moment as The Boy, originally slated to run from July through September 2020. Due to stringent restrictions following an uptick of infections amid the COVID-19 pandemic, performances only operated through the end of August. His first Japanese single "Amazing" was released on November 25.

In tribute to his late father, Jung released the digital single "Stay" on June 17, 2025. He is scheduled to release an album in early September. He released his 3rd single album on September 2 with 행로 (行路) and the title track of the same name after 6 years.

He will perform at the APEC Music Festa on October 10, 2025.

On December 10, 2025, he received an award at the 33rd Korea Culture and Entertainment Awards.

On March 17, 2026, he released chinese version 행로 (行路).

On June 4, 2026, Daehyun released a poster for his second mini-album Puzzl(ov)e, which was scheduled for release on June 30. On June 15, he released the lead single, 'Why Am I Still Here'.

He will perform at the 29th Boryeong Mud Festival's K-pop Super Live on July 25, 2026.

== Personal life ==
He enlisted in mandatory military service on November 17, 2020. He was discharged from military service on May 16, 2022.

== Musical style ==
Jung cites Jang Woo-hyuk as a role model.

== Discography ==
=== Extended plays ===
Title	EP details	Peak chart positions	Sales
Title	EP details	KOR	Sales
Chapter2 "27"	Released: April 5, 2019; Label: Wecan Company; Format: CD, digital download; Track listing: 1. "Happy Dreams (Intro)"; 2. "You're My (너는 내게)"; 3. "Empty (feat. Jaehan of SPECTRUM)"; 4. "When You Call"; 5. "You're My (너는 내게) (Inst.)"	13	KOR: 4,400
Puzzl(ov)e	Released: June 30, 2026; Label: MA Entertainment; Format: CD, digital download; Track listing: 1. "One"; 2. "Spring After Spring (나비란)"; 3. "Why Am I Still Here (무인도)"; 4. "Name (이름)" (with Yongguk, Youngjae, Jongup, Zelo)	15	KOR: 31,005

=== Single albums ===
Title	Album details	Peak chart positions	Sales
Title	Album details	KOR	Sales
Aight	Released: October 11, 2019; Label: STX Lionheart, Genie Music; Format: CD, digital download; Track listing: 1. "Aight (아잇)"; 2. "Bomb (느낌있게)"	15	KOR: 4,648
행로 (行路)	Released: September 2, 2025; Label: MA Entertainment, Genie Music; Format: Digital download, streaming; Track listing: 1. "행로 (行路)"; 2. "行路 (Japanese Version)"; 3. "행로 (行路) (Inst.)"	12	KOR: 12,951

=== Singles ===
==== As lead artist ====
Title	Year	Peak chart positions	Album
Title	Year	KOR Down.	Album
Korean
"Shadow" (featuring Zelo)	2017	—	Dae Hyun X Jong Up Project Album 'Party Baby'
"Baby"	2018	—	Dae Hyun 1st Digital Single Album [Baby]
"You're My" (너는 내게; Neoneun Naege)	2019	—	Chapter2 "27"
"Aight" (아잇; Ait)	2019	—	Aight
"Stay"	2025	—	Non-album single
"Haeng-ro" (행로)	2025	194	행로
"Why Am I Still Here" (무인도)	2026	—	Puzzl(ov)e
"Spring After Spring (나비란)	2026	—	Puzzl(ov)e
Japanese
"Amazing"	2020	—	Non-album single
"Haeng-ro" (행로) (Japanese Version)	2025	—	행로

=== Guest appearances ===
List of non-single guest appearances, with other performing artists, showing year released and album name
Title	Year	Other performer(s)	Release	Ref.
"Cocktail Love" (칵테일 사랑; Kakteil Sarang)	2014	Jun Hyo-seong, Song Ji-eun	Music Travel Yesterday 6	
"One More Time" (한 번만 더; Han Beonman Deo)	2015	Kim Jung-tae	King of Mask Singer 33	
"Empty Glass" (빈잔; Binjan)	2015	—N/a	King of Mask Singer 34	
"All Things Will Pass"	2020	—N/a	Sweet Munchies OST	

== Filmography ==
=== Film ===
Title	Year	Role	Network	Ref.
Beside Love (걸애(愛))	2026	Daehyun	KITZ	

=== Web series ===
Title	Year	Role	Network	Ref.
Meal Kid	2020	Kim Ban-seok	Naver TV	

== Theater ==
Year	Title	Role	Notes	Ref.
2017	Napoleon	Lucien		
2017–2018	All Shook Up	Elvis		
2019–2020	Grease	Danny		
2020	The Moment	The Boy		
2021	Meissa's Song	Yeon Jun-seok	Military musical	
