= Going Crazy (Song Ji-eun song) =

Single by Song Ji-eun featuring Bang Yong-guk
- Released: March 3, 2011
- Recorded: 2011
- Genre: K-pop; R&B
- Length: 3:50
- Label: TS
- Songwriters: Bang Yong-guk; Kang Ji-won; Kim Ki-bum
- Producers: Kang Ji-won; Kim Ki-bum

Song Ji-eun Korean singles chronology
"Yesterday" (2009)	"Going Crazy" (2011)	"It's Cold (Take Care of us, Captain OST)" (2012)

"Going Crazy" (Korean: 미친거니; RR: Michin Geoni) is a solo debut single by South Korean singer Song Ji-eun. It is released as a digital single on March 3, 2011 through TS Entertainment. The song's inspiration came from the producers who have felt they needed to showcase a darker side of Jieun, thus coming up with the idea of a stalking relationship. The song features BAP's Bang Yong-guk, who sings the rap parts of the song. The song's lyrics tells of a fallen relationship in which the protagonist couldn't stand the stalking of her obsessed ex-lover.

The song was written and produced by Kang Ji-won and Kim Ki-bum, the same composers of Secret's hits such as "Magic", "Madonna"and "Shy Boy". "Going Crazy" is a mid-tempo hip hop ballad with guitar, piano and violin instrumentation. Featured singer, Bang Yong-guk participated in the song's production by writing the lyrics of his rap parts in "Going Crazy".

The single was promoted with live performances and a music video. Jieun and Yongguk promoted the song on M Countdown, Music Bank, SBS MTV's The Show, Music Core and Inkigayo. In December 2011, a remix version of "Going Crazy" was performed on MBC's 2011 Gayo Daejaejun!. They also performed the song on B.A.P's debut showcase in January 2011. The accompanying video, directed by Johnny Bro's Hon Won-ki and filmed in February 2011, stars Min Hyo-rin and B.A.P's Kim Him-chan in a kidnapping scene as Jieun and Yongguk perform in an abandoned building and in a rice field.

"Going Crazy" was well received by music critics and among netizens, and charted strongly throughout various music charts. Fans praised the song for its matured lyrics as well as Jieun's vocal performance and Yongguk's rapping skills. The song managed to peak at number one on the Gaon Single Chart despite strong competition from Big Bang and IU. According to Gaon, "Going Crazy" sold 1,581,465 digital downloads in South Korea as of December 31, 2011.

== Background and release ==
“We’ve always done something cute and bright or something sad, like ballads. We’ve never done such a strong ballad genre before. It was really difficult for me to find my pitch during the recording. In my daily speech, I usually beat around the bush, so the lyrics were a bit difficult for me as well since it contained a lot of direct expressions.”

— Jieun, on her sentiments on recording "Going Crazy".

In February 2011, TS Entertainment revealed that after Secret concluded their promotion for "Shy Boy", member Song Ji-eun will have a solo debut. Through Korean online music portal site, Bugs! coming soon page, it was revealed that Jieun will be releasing her solo single, "Going Crazy," on March 3, 2011 through various music portal sites. On February 27, TS Entertainment revealed the music video teaser for "Going Crazy" which features a girl setting up a car on fire in a middle of nowhere. The same day, TS Entertainment released the concept photo for the song and revealed that the girl from teaser video was the South Korean actress Min Hyo-rin. Through Naver, TS Entertainment released their statements on Jieun's single:

“Song Jieun prepared for her solo album consistently throughout her group activities. She’s prepared music that she’s never been able to show before [.....]"

With the release of the concept photos, Song Ji-eun created a buzz on her "radical transformation" with her hair dyed in blue as she went from a "cutesy bubble-pop concept (with "Shy Boy") to a more hardcore street-punk style". On March 3, 2011 TS Entertainment released the music video for "Going Crazy" with the rap parts sung by Bang Yong-guk from the then unknown group BAP. A CD single for "Going Crazy" was released in South Korea but only through limited edition and promotional purposes.

== Lyrics and production ==
"Going Crazy"
A 22-second song sample. Backed by an electric guitar, pounding drums and a piano, Jieun sings the first half of the chorus in a frustrated voice with vibrato and echoing sounds in some parts.

"Going Crazy" is a mid-tempo R&B-hip hop track that runs for 3:50 (3 minutes, 50 seconds). Kang Ji-won and Kim Ki-bum produced and wrote Jieun's part while Yongguk sung and wrote the rap parts of the song. The song incorporates various instruments, including piano, drums and violin. The song's inspiration came from the producers who have felt they needed to showcase a darker side of Jieun thus coming up with the idea of a stalking relationship. According to TS Entertainment, the song is an "emotional ballad track" with a dark concept. The song's lyrics tells of a relationship in which the protagonist couldn't stand the stalking of her obsessed ex-lover.

== Chart performance ==
In South Korea, "Going Crazy" entered the Gaon Single Charts at number twenty during the week of March 5, 2011. The following week the song jumped 19 places and peaked at number one the Gaon Single Charts despite strong competition from Big Bang's "Tonight" and IU's "Only I Didn't Know". "Going Crazy" also became their first number one song on the Gaon Single Chart. The song also peaked at number one in Gaon's Streaming and Digital Chart. "Going Crazy" ranked at number forty seven on Melon's 2011 year-end charts. The song ranked at number two on the Gaon Monthly Chart for the month of March. The song also ranked at number thirty eight on the Gaon Year End Chart.

== Promotion ==
=== Live performances ===
Song Ji-eun and Bang Yong-guk first performed "Going Crazy" on Mnet's M Countdown on March 3, 2011. The pair also performed the song on KBS's Music Bank, MBC's Music Core and SBS's Inkigayo in the first week of March 2011. TS Entertainment initially planned for a two-week promotion period for "Going Crazy" but due to unexpected success of the song, they planned to push it back further until the end of March 2011. The pair concluded their music shows promotion for "Going Crazy" in the last week of March 2011. On December 31, 2011, a remix version of "Going Crazy" was performed on MBC's 2011 Gayo Daejaejun!. On January 28, 2012, Jieun and Yong Guk also performed "Going Crazy" on B.A.P's debut showcase held in Seoul, South Korea.

== Reception ==
After the song's release, "Going Crazy" quickly grabbed the number one spot on major real time charts in South Korea. "Going Crazy" was number one on Gaon Singles chart in the week of March 12, 2011. Fans have praised the song for Jieun's vocal performance and its matured lyrics. In an interview through Nate and Naver, Jieun shared her sentiments on the song's unexpected popularity:

“I never expected such a response. Our agency had initially expected to be met with a loss for the album, but pushed forward anyway. Our goal was to rank in the top 30 on digital charts, since we were just aiming to show that I had other images aside from what I show with SECRET. The response I’ve been receiving actually amazes me,” she further added “I didn’t have a lot of expectations for my solo promotions, so I’m glad that the public showed so much love for the song. I just wish that I had a bit more time to promote it."

Other highlights of "Going Crazy" was the featured rapper Bang Yong-guk, whom fans praised his performance for his "husky and fiery delivery". The song garnered him popularity as he was on top of major portal search rankings in South Korea after the song's release. Additionally, Yong Guk has been requested for multiple broadcast appearances as representatives expressed interest in his "handsome looks and professional stage performances". However, TS Entertainment declined the offer and stated that "He's still a trainee so he's not set to appear in broadcasts other than for ‘Going Crazy’ promotions. However, thank you for giving your support to a new singer". Representatives from TS Entertainment shared their views on Bang Yong-guk's performance and said, "Despite being a rookie, he received the opportunity to participate in Song Ji Eun's solo album. He may be lacking, but thank you for showing him your interest." Through Naver, Yongguk shared his sentiments on promoting "Going Crazy":

“I’ve realized that actually being on stage is vastly different from everything I’ve rehearsed for and that I still have more to learn. If there's anything I’m disappointed in, it's that I wish I had written the lyrics a bit better. I knew that I didn't express the actions of a true stalker as well as I could have, and I’m regretful that I couldn't show more on stage."

=== Controversy ===
In July 2011, The Ministry of Gender Equality and Family of South Korea compiled a list of songs going to be banned for their harmful content to the youth. Among those was "Going Crazy" because both the song and its music video were encouraging crime. With this, songs that are banned cannot be sold to minors under the age of 19 and cannot be aired before 10 pm KST through radio or television.

== Music video ==
=== Synopsis ===
Video stills in which Min Hyorin kisses Kim Himchan (left). And before blowing the car up with her lighter while Himchan is in the car trunk (right)

The music video was produced by Zanybros (whose list of clients include 4Minute, Beast, BAP, Girls' Generation, Seo Taiji) for TS Entertainment. Its director is Hong Won-ki and the cinematographer is Kim Jun-hong.

The music video opens with a woman (Min Hyo-rin) parking a car in a highway at night. After the woman opens her car trunk, the video flashes back to that morning where the woman was driving along a highway. Jieun proceeds to sing the first verse of the song while playing a piano in an abandoned building. Then Yongguk begins to rap in front a red wall and in a misty rice field while Jieun continues playing the piano in the abandoned building. After the interchanging shots between the three, Jieun proceeds to sing the chorus in the rice field and along with shots where she sings in the back seat of the car. After the first chorus, the woman stops the car to check her lighter, then continues driving to her destination.

Jieun returns to sing the second verse of the song with interchanging scenes from the abandoned building, the misty rice field and in the back seat of the car. Yongguk proceeds to rap in the misty rice field but this time his hands are tied up with ropes while sitting in a chair and blindfolded in the scene where he raps in front of a red wall. The video returns to the present where the woman has parked her car in a road near a rice field at night. When Jieun starts to sing the second chorus, the woman opens her car trunk in a straight-on view, revealing a captive man (Kim Him Chan) who had been blindfolded and tied up with rope. The woman takes a jug of gasoline in the trunk of her car and kisses the man. She then pours gasoline on the prisoner and backs up a distance from the car. The video ends with the woman igniting her lighter and throwing it in the pool of gasoline. The video ends before the car explodes.

=== Music Bank special ===
On March 3, 2011 Jieun debuted on music programs with her first solo single, "Going Crazy". She continued her round of promotions, but on March 11, 2011 she prepared a "special treat" for fans watching KBS's Music Bank. Jieun and Yongguk were set to perform the song in the usual setting, but instead of a live stage, a special alternative music video for "Going Crazy" was aired. Song Ji-eun acted out a scenario where she was being stalked by an obsessive man played by Yongguk who also plays as a police investigator – leaving the idea that perhaps Jieun's character tried to free herself from the "manic clutches' of her stalker in a "less-than-legal manner".

== Track listing ==
Korean single
No.	Title	Length
1.	"미친거니" (Going Crazy)	3:50
2.	"미친거니 (Instrumental)" (Going Crazy)	3:50
Total length:		7:40

== Credits and personnel ==
These credits were adapted from the Going Crazy (CD) liner notes.

- Song Ji-eun – vocals
- Bang Yong-guk – vocals, rap, songwriting
- Kang Ji-won – producing, songwriting
- Kim Ki-bum – producing, songwriting

== Charts ==
Chart	Peak position
Gaon Singles Chart	1
Gaon Local Singles chart	1
Gaon Streaming Singles chart	1
Gaon Download Singles chart	1
Gaon Mobile Ringtone chart	5

== Release history ==
Country	Date	Format	Label
Worldwide	March 3, 2011	Digital download	TS Entertainment; LOEN Entertainment
South Korea	March 3, 2011	Digital download	TS Entertainment; LOEN Entertainment
