= Song Ji-eun =

South Korean singer and actress (born 1990)

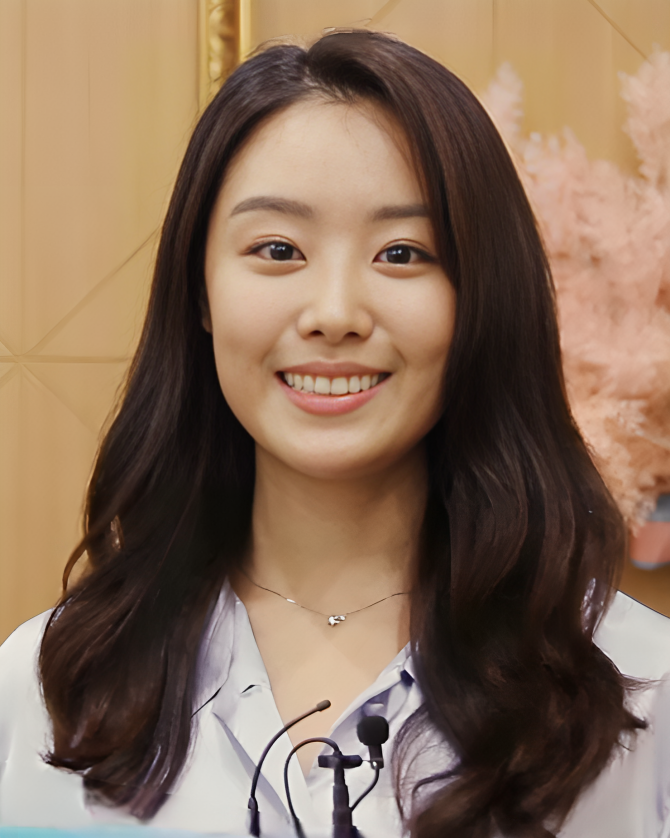
- Song in September 2019
- Born: May 5, 1990 (age 36); Seoul, South Korea
- Occupations: Singer; actress
- Agent: Weracle Factory
- Spouse: Park We (m. 2024)
- Musical career
- Genre: K-pop
- Instrument: Vocals
- Years active: 2009–present
- Labels: TS; Haewadal; 6 Oceans; Onesoulenm; Magiq
- Formerly of: Secret

Korean name
- Hangul: 송지은
- RR: Song Jieun
- MR: Song Chiŭn

Song Ji-eun (Korean: 송지은; born May 5, 1990), better known mononymously as Jieun, is a South Korean singer and actress best known as a member of the South Korean girl group Secret. Aside from her group's activities, she has released several solo songs and participated in various OSTs. In 2011, her second single, "Going Crazy" featuring Bang Yong-guk, went to become her first number one single on the Gaon Chart as a solo artist.

== Life and career ==
=== 1990–2008: Early life and career beginnings ===
Song Ji-eun was born on May 5, 1990, in South Korea, she is an only child. Having interest in music when she was young, she auditioned for JYP Entertainment at an early age. While in JYP Entertainment, she sang OSTs of Korean dramas in 2007 and 2008 such as "Learning To Fly" for Air City. Under JYP Entertainment, she was set off to debut as a four-member girl group with Sistar's Hyorin, BESTie's Uji and EXID's Hani, but the plan was scrapped and Ji-eun then left JYP Entertainment and joined TS Entertainment.

=== 2009–2014: Debut with Secret and rising popularity ===
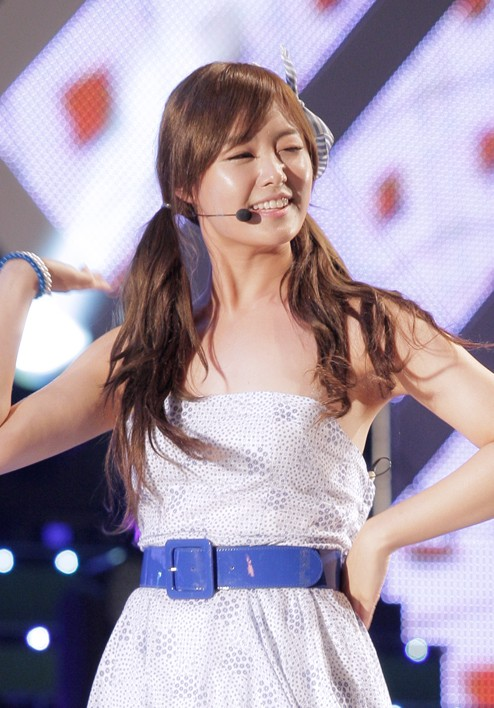
Song performing in 2011

In September 2009, TS Entertainment announced that they will be debuting a four-member girl group in October 2009. Song, along with Han Sun-hwa, Jung Ha-na and Jun Hyo-seong, debuted as the group, Secret. Prior to their debut, the group was on a documentary show called "Secret Story" which chronicled their debut process. They released their debut single "I Want You Back" in October 2009.

In December 2009, she sang a duet with Hwanhee titled, "Yesterday".

After Secret's success with "Shy Boy", TS Entertainment announced that Song will make her solo debut with the song "Going Crazy". The song was dubbed as an "emotional ballad track" and "different to what she's shown through Secret". The single, released in March 2011, was a success and peaked at number one on Gaon Singles Chart, making it Song's and Bang's first number one single in Korea.

In 2013, Song released her first single album Hope Torture, which she unveiled at her album showcase at the Olleh Square in Gwanghwamun.

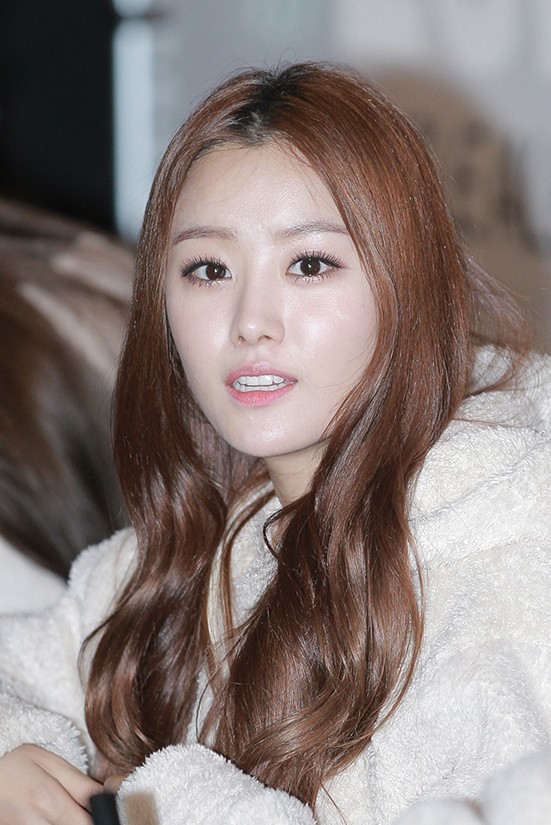
Song at a fansigning event in 2014

In 2014, Song released her first extended play, titled 25, which contained two singles "Don't Look At Me Like That" and "Pretty Age 25". The same year, Song made her acting debut in the web drama Drawing, Spring, as a part-time worker for a PR team, who loves all living things but has traumatic experience with horses.

=== 2015–present: Acting career, Bobby Doll, and departure from Secret ===
In April 2015, Song featured in fantasy youth comedy The Superman Age, an 8-episode series which aired on cable channel tvN. She then starred in the web drama The Immutable Law of First Love, based on a web novel of the same name, playing a photographer who loves abandoned dogs. In November, she starred in KBS's daily drama Sweet Home, Sweet Honey and received positive reception on her performance.

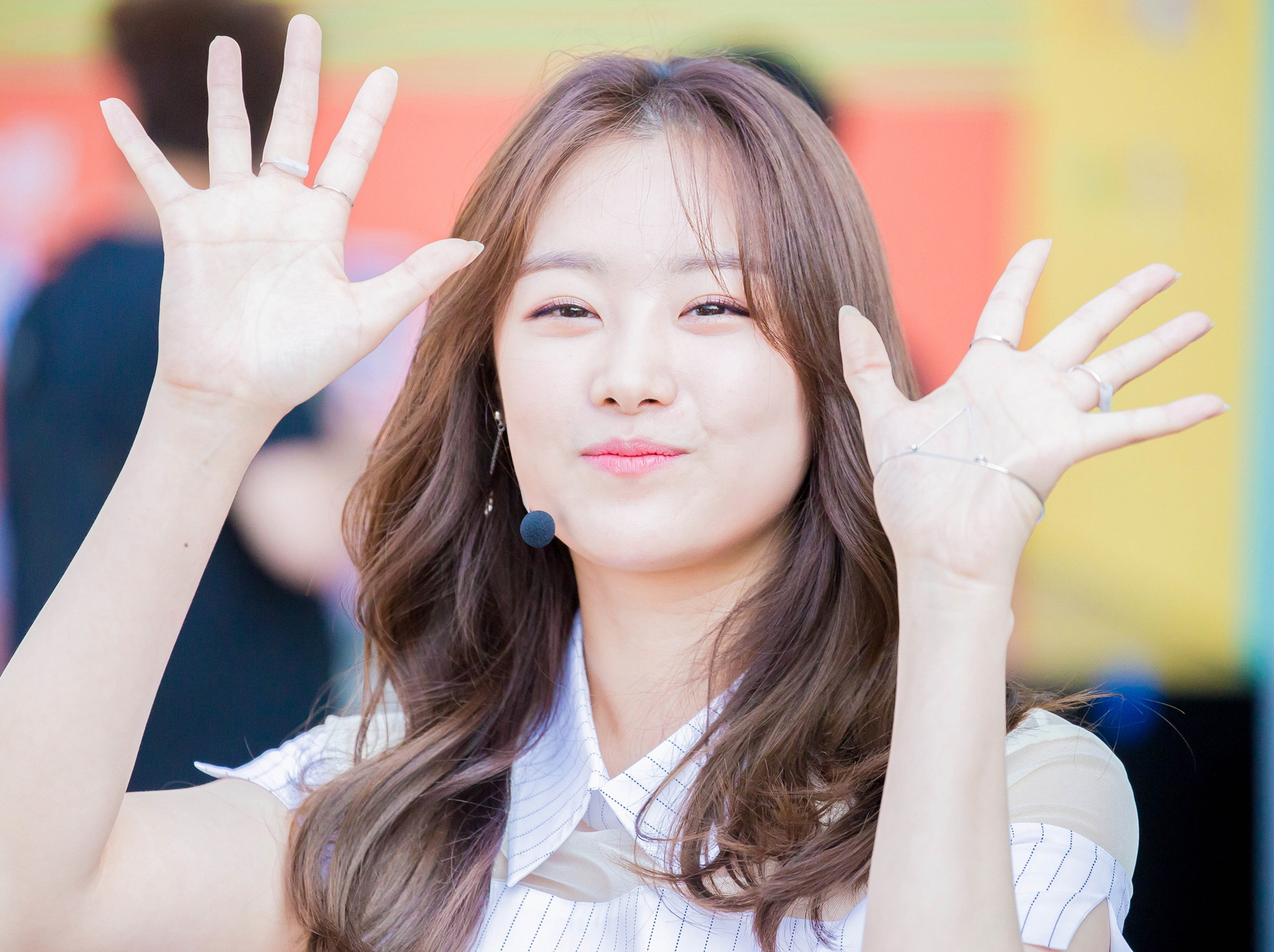
Song at U Clean Concert in 2016

In September 2016, Song released her second extended play, titled Bobby Doll containing six tracks, including the title track of the same name.

In April 2017, Song starred in OCN's romantic comedy drama My Secret Romance alongside Sung Hoon.

In August 2017, Song submitted a request to the Korean Commercial Arbitration Board to verify that her contract is no longer valid due to TS Entertainment not following the terms of the contract. Song later took to her Instagram where she announced her departure from Secret.

== Personal life ==
On December 21, 2023, Song announced through her Instagram account that she was in a relationship with YouTuber Park We of the channel Weracle. On March 12, 2024, the couple announced their engagement. The couple married on October 9, 2024, in Gangnam.

== Discography ==
=== EPs ===
| Title | Album details | Peak chart positions | | Sales |
| Title | Album details | KOR | JPN | Sales |
Korean
| 25 | Released: October 14, 2014; Label: TS Entertainment; Format: CD, digital download | 6 | — | KOR: 5,796 |
| Bobby Doll | Released: September 20, 2016; Label: TS Entertainment; Format: CD, digital download; Track listing: 1. I Wanna Fall In Love; 2. Bobby Doll (바비돌); 3. Off The Record; 4. Oasis (오아시스); 5. It's Alright (괜찮아요); 6. Bobby Doll (바비돌) (Inst.) | 5 | 285 | KOR: 5,300+; JPN: 229 |
| Dream | Released: July 26, 2020; Label: OneSoul Entertainment; Format: CD, digital download; Track listing: 1. Mirage (신기루); 2. MIL (Make It Love); 3. Cradle Song; 4. Mirage (신기루) (Inst.); 5. MIL (Make It Love) (Inst.); 6. Cradle Song (Inst.) | — | — | —N/a |
Japanese
| 25 | Released: December 2, 2014; Label: Kiss Entertainment; Format: CD, digital download | — | 29 | JPN: 4,816 |
"—" denotes releases that did not chart or were not released in that region.

=== Single albums ===
| Title | Album details | Peak chart positions | Sales |
| Title | Album details | KOR | Sales |
Korean
| Hope Torture | Released: September 30, 2013; Label: TS Entertainment; Format: CD, digital download | 6 | KOR: 2,688 |
| Bloom (피어나:開花) | Released: October 22, 2020; Label: Wonsoul E&M; Format: CD, digital download | — | —N/a |
"—" denotes releases that did not chart or were not released in that region.

=== Singles ===
==== As lead artist ====
| Title | Year | Peak chart positions | | Sales (digital downloads) | Album |
| Title | Year | KOR | US World | Sales (digital downloads) | Album |
|---|---|---|---|---|---|
| "Yesterday" (어젠 with Hwanhee) | 2009 | 27 | — | —N/a | Non-album singles |
| "Going Crazy" (미친거니 featuring Bang Yong-guk) | 2011 | 1 | — | KOR: 1,581,465 | Non-album singles |
| "Hope Torture" (희망고문) | 2013 | 9 | — | KOR: 324,742 | Hope Torture |
| "Don't Look At Me Like That" (쳐다보지마) | 2014 | 27 | 22 | KOR: 119,127 | 25 |
| "Pretty Age 25" (예쁜 나이 25살) | 2014 | 15 | — | KOR: 255,349 | 25 |
| "Cool Night" (쿨밤 with Sleepy) | 2015 | 18 | — | KOR: 213,195 | Non-album singles |
| "Bobby Doll" (바비돌) | 2016 | 105 | — | KOR: 17,100 | Bobby Doll |
| "Tell Me" | 2017 | — | — | —N/a | Non-album singles |
| "Please Make us new" (새롭게 하소서 with Joo Young-hoon, Park Yo-han,Ahn Su-ji, Yeoniel (Taeyeon)) | 2020 | — | — | —N/a | Non-album singles |
| "MIL (Make it love)" | 2020 | — | — | —N/a | Dream |
| "Bloom" (피어나:開花) | 2020 | — | — | —N/a | Bloom |
"—" denotes releases that did not chart or were not released in that region.

==== As featured artist ====
| Title | Year | Peak chart positions | Album |
| Title | Year | KOR | Album |
|---|---|---|---|
| "Let's Go" (as a part of G20) | 2010 | 116 | Non-album singles |
| "Secret Love" (B.A.P feat. Song Ji-eun) | 2012 | 132 | Non-album singles |
"—" denotes releases that did not chart or were not released in that region.

=== Soundtrack appearances ===
| Year | Title | Drama |
|---|---|---|
| 2007 | "Learning To Fly" | Air City |
| 2008 | "Bichunmooga" (비천무가 (飛天舞歌)) | Bichunmoo |
| 2008 | "Perfume" (향수 with PK Heman) | The Lawyers of the Great Republic Korea |
| 2012 | "It's Cold" (추워요) | Take Care of Us, Captain |
| 2014 | "If Only I Could Go To You" (너에게 갈 수만 있다면) | God's Gift: 14 Days |
| 2015 | "Person I Miss" (보고 싶은 사람) | Shine or Go Crazy |
| 2015 | "D.N.A Love" (연애세포 with Alex Chu) | Flirty Boy and Girl |
| 2017 | "Same" (똑 같아요 with Sung Hoon) | My Secret Romance |
| 2019 | "Let Me Hear" (들려줘 with Basick) | Confession |
| 2019 | "Wonderful Day" (눈부신 날) | I Wanna Hear Your Song |
| 2019 | "Between Us" (우리 둘 사이로) | Wish Woosh 2 |

=== Participation in albums ===
| Year | Title | Album |
|---|---|---|
| 2015 | "Love is Rainwater Outside the Window" (사랑은 창밖에 빗물 같아요(as I'm Happy Because of Rabbits)) | King of Mask Singer: Special |
| 2015 | "Let's Go to the Beach" (해변으로 가요 with Sleepy) | Immortal Songs: Singing the Legend (Summer with Friends Special) |

=== Music videos ===
| Year | Music video |
|---|---|
| 2011 | "Going Crazy" |
| 2012 | "It's Cold" |
| 2013 | "False Hope" |
| 2014 | "Don't Look at me Like That" |
| 2014 | "Pretty Age 25" |
| 2015 | "Cool Night" |
| 2016 | "Bobby Doll" |
| 2020 | "MIL (Make it love)" |
| 2020 | "Bloom" |

== Filmography ==
=== Film ===
| Year | Title | Role | Notes | Ref. |
|---|---|---|---|---|
| 2024 | Wannabe | Park Ji-min | Film debut | |

=== Television series ===
| Year | Title | Role |
|---|---|---|
| 2010 | More Charming by the Day | Cameo |
| 2012 | Family | Cameo (Episode 45) |
| 2013 | Pure Love | Kang Soo-ji (young) |
| 2015 | The Superman Age | Ji-Eun |
| 2015 | Sweet Home, Sweet Honey | Oh Bom |
| 2017 | My Secret Romance | Lee Yoo-mi |
| 2019 | Melting Me Softly | Oh Young-seon |
| 2021 | So I Married the Anti-fan | Flight attendant (Cameo) |
| 2021 | Shh, Please Take Care of Him | Jeon Seol |
| 2021 | The Man's Voice | Go Mi-rim |
| 2021 | Anyway Thirty | Joo Seo-eun |

=== Web series ===
| Year | Title | Role |
|---|---|---|
| 2014 | Longing for Spring | Yang Mal-ja |
| 2015 | Immutable Law of First Love | Lee Yeo-ri |
| 2019 | Wish Woosh 2 | Min Ji-woo |

== Awards and nominations ==
Name of the award ceremony, year presented, category, nominee of the award, and the result of the nomination
| Award ceremony | Year | Category | Nominee / Work | Result | Ref. |
|---|---|---|---|---|---|
| Seoul International Webfest | 2015 | Best New Actress | Longing for Spring | Won | |
