= Secret (South Korean group) =

South Korean girl group

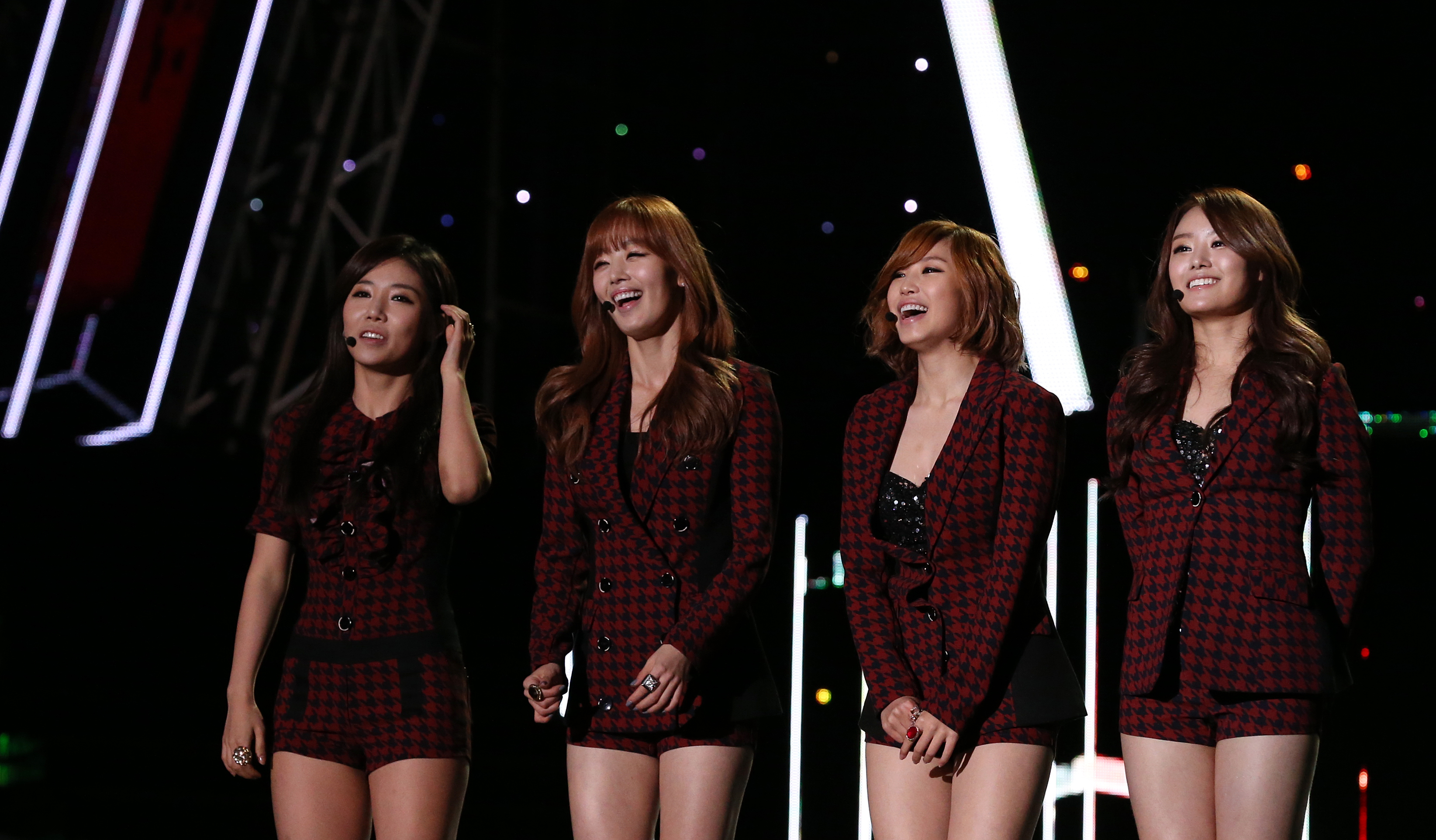
- Secret at the Kpop World Festival in 2012 (L–R: Jung Ha-na, Han Sun-hwa, Jun Hyo-seong, Song Ji-eun)

Background information
- Origin: Seoul, South Korea
- Genres: K-pop; dance-pop
- Years active: 2009–2018; 2026–present
- Labels: TS; RBW
- Members: Jun Hyo-seong; Jung Ha-na; Kim Ye-bin
- Past members: Song Ji-eun; Han Sun-hwa

Secret (Korean: 시크릿) is a South Korean girlgroup under RBW. They originally debuted with four members: Jun Hyo-seong, Jung Ha-na, Song Ji-eun and Han Sun-hwa under TS Entertainment with their debut digital single "I Want You Back" in October 2009. Their debut was not a commercial success and it was not until the following year that the group saw a rise in popularity. In 2010, Secret released two singles "Magic" and "Madonna", which reached No. 2 and No. 1 respectively on the Gaon Digital Chart. They received the "Newcomer Award" at the 25th Golden Disk Awards.

In 2011, Secret adopted a girl-next-door image through songs like "Shy Boy" and "Starlight Moonlight". Secret won two awards at the 1st Gaon Chart Awards for the months of January and June. Secret released their first full-length album Moving in Secret in October 2011, featuring the lead single "Love is Move".

In August of the same year, Secret made their Japanese debut releasing their first single, "Madonna", a remake of their Korean hit single, which debuted at number nine on the Oricon charts. Throughout 2012, Secret heavily promoted in Japan releasing two Japanese singles, "So Much For Goodbye" and "Twinkle Twinkle", prior to releasing their first full-length Japanese album, Welcome to Secret Time. Twinkle Twinkle was used as the ending theme song of the Naruto spin-off, "Naruto SD: Rock Lee and his Ninja Pals" which aired on TV Tokyo.

After almost a year of absence from the South Korean music industry, Secret released their third extended play Poison in September 2012 followed by the digital single Talk That in December. The following year Secret released their fourth extended play Letter from Secret in April 2013 and their third single album, Gift From Secret in December 2013. In August 2014, Secret released their fifth extended play Secret Summer. In 2026, Secret reunited as a trio with new member Kim Ye-bin to release their seventh mini-album Secret Flavor.

== Career ==
=== 2009–2010: Debut with I Want You Back, Secret Time, and Madonna ===
The documentary Secret Story which aired on Mnet introduced Secret to the public. The show chronicled the debut process of the members and aired their invitation-only debut showcase, which took place on September 29, 2009. On October 13, 2009, Secret officially debuted with the release of the music video of "I Want You Back", their first single. Two days later, on October 15, 2009, they had their first live stage on M! Countdown. Secret participated in the Master of Study OST with the song "Friends" which was released in January 2010.

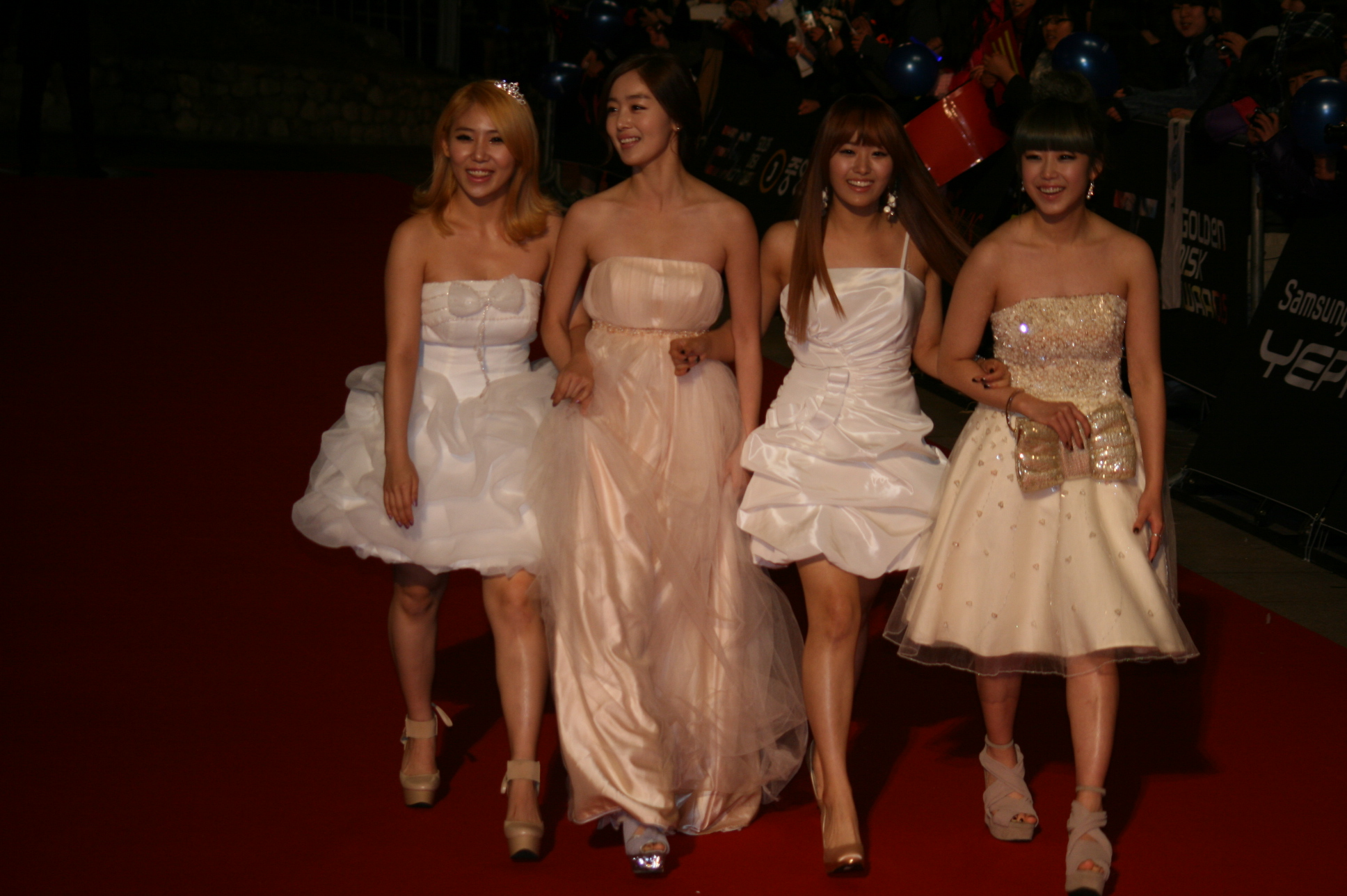
Secret at the 25th Golden Disc Awards in 2010

On March 31, 2010, Secret revealed the music video for "Magic", the title track of their debut mini album Secret Time. Secret had their comeback performance for "Magic" on M! Countdown on April 8, 2010. The song peaked at number five on the Music Bank K-Chart. The music video quickly reached one million views on video sharing sites such as YouTube and Cyworld, and the "Suspender Dance" which appeared in the video, gained popularity amongst netizens.

Secret released their second mini album titled Madonna on August 12, 2010. The music video for the title track of the same name was released on August 11, 2010. Kang Ji-won and Kim Ki-bum, the composers who wrote "Madonna", highlighted that the inspiration behind the song was about living with confidence by becoming an icon in this generation, like the American singer Madonna. Like their previous single "Magic", the music video for "Madonna" reached one million views on video sharing sites such as YouTube and Cyworld. "Madonna" was better received than "Magic", topping every major online music chart within two weeks and peaking at number one on the Gaon Chart. The song also won the Bonsang Award (Main Prize) at the 20th Seoul Music Awards. On December 9, 2010, Secret attended the 25th Golden Disk Awards, and won the Newcomer Award.

=== 2011–2012: Rising popularity, Japanese debut, Poison, and Talk That ===
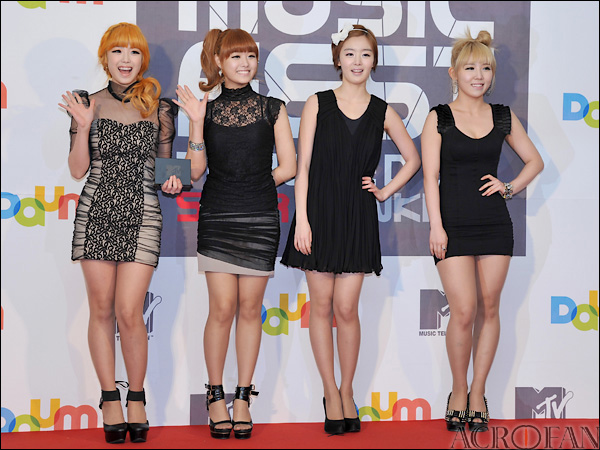
Secret at MTV Daum music fest in 2011

Secret released the single Shy Boy in January 2011. On January 13, Secret won their very first music show award on M! Countdown. Secret also managed to stay at number one on Music Bank for three consecutive weeks. During that timespan, Secret also won a mutizen award on Inkigayo. They released their second single album, Starlight Moonlight on June 1, 2011. The song won Secret their second "Mutizen" on Inkigayo with the song. On August 3, 2011, the group released their first single in Japan, "Madonna", which debuted at number nine on the Oricon charts.

On October 18, 2011, Secret released their first studio album, Moving in Secret. "Shy Boy" was remade to serve as the title track on their first mini album in Japan. On November 16, 2011, Secret released their first Japanese mini album, Shy Boy. They have attended the KBEE (Korea Brand & Entertainment Expo) in Paris, France, on December 1 to 3, 2011.

In February 2012, Secret released their second Japanese single entitled So Much For Goodbye. On February 22, they won two "Singers of the Year" awards at the Gaon Chart Awards, for "Shy Boy" and "Starlight Moonlight". In March, the group held their first head-lining tour in Japan named "Secret 1st Japan Tour". It took place in Osaka on March 5, Nagoya on March 7 and Tokyo on March 8. Secret released their third Japanese single Twinkle Twinkle on June 13. Twinkle Twinkle was used as the ending theme song of the Naruto spin-off, Naruto SD: Rock Lee and his Ninja Pals. The group released their first Japanese studio album named Welcome to Secret Time on August 22. The Japanese version of "Love is Move" served as the lead single. The album also included Japanese remakes of their Korean hit singles "Madonna" and "Shy Boy", and "Starlight Moonlight", along with the two original Japanese singles "So Much for Goodbye" and "Twinkle Twinkle".

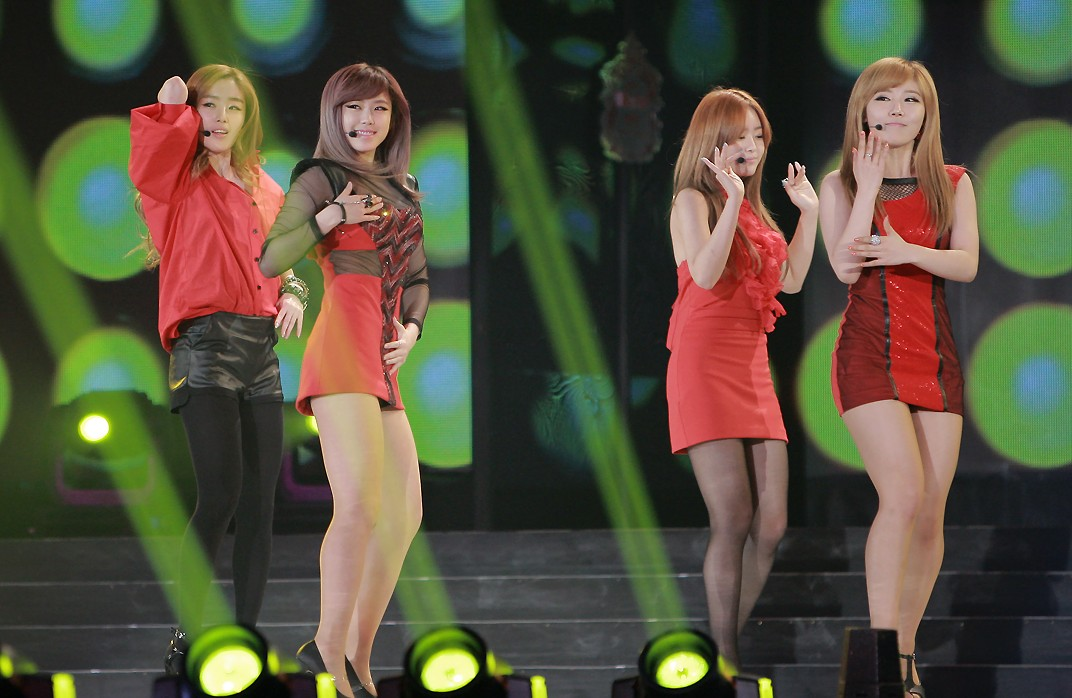
Secret performing at K Collection in Seoul in 2012

In September, Secret released the EP Poison in South Korea. The lead of the same name was an "upbeat dance track", written and produced by Kang Ji-won and Kim Ki-bum whom they previously worked with their previous hit singles. According to TS Entertainment, "Poison" had "unique characteristics and colors of Secret but will have a change in concept from the cute and friendly image [shown in the past] to a sexy and feminine concept."

The single Talk That, was released on December 4. It was produced by Shinsadong Tiger, whom has previously worked with their hit track "Magic". The music video for "Talk That" was directed by Zanybros' Hong Won-ki. "Talk That" received generally positive reviews from critics, most of whom had praised the song for its mature musical style and concept as opposed to their previous singles.

On the night of December 11, 2012, Secret was involved in a car accident. Hyoseong, Jieun and Sunhwa received only a few scratches and knee pain, but Hana suffered broken ribs and a bruised lung and therefore halted from Secret's activities in order to recover. On December 27, Sunhwa and labelmate B.A.P's Youngjae teamed up to release a digital single titled "Everything is Pretty" as a present for Secret and B.A.P fans.

=== 2013–2014: Letter from Secret, Gift From Secret and Secret Summer ===
In January 2013, Secret continued to perform "Talk That" on various music and award shows without Hana. Hana ended her hiatus and officially rejoined Secret when she performed at the 22nd Seoul Music Awards and won a bonsang award. On March 29, Secret held their solo concert in Singapore, performing in front of 5,000 fans at the Marina Bay Sands Convention Hall. Secret's fourth mini album, titled Letter from SECRET, with "YooHoo" as the album's lead single, was released on April 30. YooHoo managed to top real time charts such as Mnet, Bugs Olleh, and Sorribada. Secret became one of the most searched terms on South Korean portal sites in the midst of their return. In June 2013, Secret signed with Kiss Entertainment for future Japan activities. They also moved from Sony Music to Universal Music Group Japan (Universal D's Sub-Label). On December 9, the group's third single album, Gift From Secret, featuring lead single "I Do I Do" was released. As the album was released during winter TS Entertainment stated that the lead single, "I Do I Do is a lively and warm song and is also reminiscent of carols, which will match well with the coming winter season." I Do I Do was produced by Kang Ji-won and Kim Ki-bum.

On February 5, 2014, Secret released the Japanese version of their Korean single "I Do I Do" along with a music video, which marks their first Japanese release with Kiss Entertainment. On May 29, Tower Records Japan revealed that Secret would release a single album in Japan. Before the release of their fifth Japanese single, Secret held their third Japan tour titled 2014 Secret's Summer Live ~YooHoo~. On July 23 Secret released a Japanese version of their Korean single "YooHoo". On August 11, Secret released their fifth mini album Secret Summer with "I'm In Love" as its lead single. I'm In Love was produced by hitmaker Duble Sidekick. Sonamoo member New Sun also took part in composing the track Look At Me which is featured on the album.

=== 2015–2018: Members departure, legal disputes with TS and presumed disbandment ===
On September 26, 2016, it was announced that Sunhwa would be leaving the group after deciding not to renew her contract with TS Entertainment in order to pursue a career in acting. Sunhwa's contract with TS Entertainment was terminated on October 13. The group would continue with the remaining three members.

On February 28, 2018, it was reported that Hyoseong and Jieun were in legal disputes with TS Entertainment. Hyoseong's legal disputes with TS is due to issues such as not receiving payments. It was also reported that in August 2017, Jieun submitted a request to the Korean Commercial Arbitration Board to verify that her contract is no longer valid due to TS Entertainment not following the terms of the contract.

=== 2026–present: Reformed under new label and line-up changes ===
On June 3, 2026, Secret announced through their new official social media accounts they had reformed under RBW after twelve years and RBW cautiously conveyed its position to News1, stating, "We are preparing for Secret's comeback" and said " We will provide specific details regarding the comeback in due course". On June 8, 2026 new member Yebin was introduced. Secret officially returned with the EP Secret Flavor, their first comeback in twelve years.

== Controversy ==
Jieun later announced via Instagram that she was no longer a member of Secret as her contract was violated and no longer exists. On March 5, Hyoseong's lawyer revealed that she had filed a civil lawsuit against TS Entertainment in September 2017 to confirm that her contract with the agency is no longer valid. Hyoseong's lawyer stated “First, there are payments that Jun Hyo-seong has not received. TS Entertainment also transferred the management rights conferred by its exclusive contract with the singer to another party without the consent of Jun Hyoseong herself. Not only is this a clear violation of her contract, but it is also a source of instability in her promotions as a singer.” He also stated that it would be unlikely of Hyoseong to remain a member of Secret while under TS Entertainment given the situation and the lack of trust and communication between the agency and Hyoseong, effectively ending the group.

== Artistry ==
=== Musical styles and theme ===
Retro is the main musical style of the majority of Secret's singles, although the group has channeled other genres such as pop, dance, R&B, and hip-hop. Secret were originally formed with an intention to be an RnB and Hip-Hop group as seen in their debut single, "I Want You Back". As Seoulbeats wrote, "Originally debuting with an urban RnB concept, the girls of Secret have transformed themselves into the queens of retro ever since their breakthrough hits with “Magic” and “Madonna”. Furthermore, with Wonder Girls recently vacating their long-held affair with retro in favor of a more fresh and futuristic(?) approach, Secret lays claim as the next best group to have established a retro identity." Catherine Deen of Yahoo! Philippines said that the group is known "for its unique ability to take retro music and make it their own." While reviewing "Love is Move", Park Hyunmin of enewsWorld commented that Secret is "known for its pop-heavy beats and easy-to-follow dance moves". Hyunmin further added that "Secret's main appeal is its retro beat and sexy choreography".

Secret's output, particularly with their work with Kang Ji-won and Kim Ki-bum, makes use of live instruments such as brass, saxophones and drums with the incorporation of synthesizers and electric guitars.

=== Image ===
Secret is also known for their transitions to cute and the girl-next-door image through songs like "Shy Boy" and "Starlight Moonlight" from the sexy and powerful image through "Magic", "Madonna" and "Poison" while still retaining retro as the main theme for their sound. Although a commercial success with "Magic" and "Madonna" peaking at number two and number one respectively on the Gaon Charts, Secret failed to win a first place award on any televised South Korean weekly music shows such as M! Countdown, Music Bank and Inkigayo until "Shy Boy". During their promotions with "Poison", Jun Hyoseong commented "Secret has always been known as a cute group that appeals to the general public. This time, however, we′ve escaped that and showed off our unique charms. Our visuals have also changed for the sexy." Jun added, "We′re actually closer to Shy Boy in real life."

== Endorsements and other activities ==
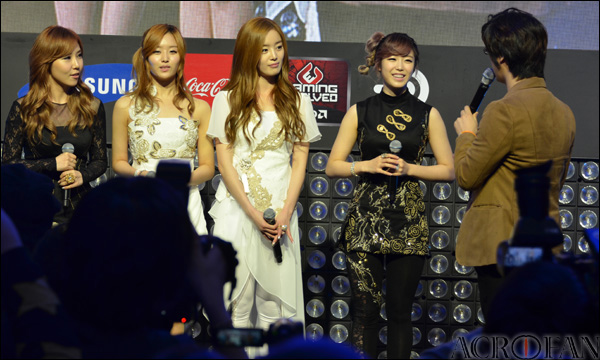
Secret at the Blade & Soul launch party, Seoul, South Korea. Blade & Soul made special video game characters modeled after Secret.

The group's popularity and success in Korea has led to endorsement deals such as Gueoseu Chicken, Googims mall, Grand Mer(Online Fishing Game), Nike, Nene Chicken, Good Day Soju and Parkga among others. Sunhwa became more active in acting, modelling and frequently participating in variety shows. In 2009, she became a fixed cast on a popular variety show called Invincible Youth.

In December 2010, Secret and the Korean Non-Life Insurance Association (KNIA) teamed up to film a Commercial Film in a Gangnam studio to share their message of concern against drunk driving. With Secret, they were also appointed as ambassadors in campaigns and events such as The Seoul Competition Movie Content 'Streamed Seoul 2009' Goodwill Ambassador (2009), The 18th National Women's Soccer Tournament ambassador (2010), The Eco-Project environmental campaign 'Urban Farm' (2010), The 8th International Paralympic Skills Competition (2010) and others. On December 28, 2011, Secret were appointed as PR ambassadors for the ‘Korea Consumers Forum’. After the group filmed the music video of "YooHoo" in Saipan during the month of April in 2013, the tourism board of Northern Mariana Islands named Secret as their newest tourism ambassador for 2013. Secret joined fellow South Korean artist Psy as their new tourism ambassador who joined in 2012.

On January 10, 2013, KBS revealed that Han Sunhwa would make her acting debut on prime-time television with Advertisement Genius, Lee Tae Baek as Lee So Ran, an aspiring actress and the younger sister of Lee Tae Baek played by actor Jin Goo.

== Awards ==
In 2010, Secret released their hit single "Magic" which was nominated at the 12th Mnet Asian Music Awards for Best Dance Performance by a Female Group. The same year, the group released their number one hit single "Madonna" which won them a Bonsang award at the 20th Seoul Music Awards. With the success of "Magic" and "Madonna", the group received the "Newcomer award" at the 25th Golden Disk Awards.

"Shy Boy" earned the group's first win in Mnet's M! Countdown and SBS's Inkigayo. The song was their first Triple Crown in KBS's Music Bank and garnered them multiple awards and nominations. The song was nominated for Song of the Year and Best Dance Performance by a Female Group at the 13th Mnet Asian Music Awards. The song won a Bonsang award at the 21st Seoul Music Awards and at the 3rd Melon Music Awards. The song also won the Songs of the Year Award at the 1st Gaon Chart Awards for the month of January. Following the success of "Shy Boy", Secret released Starlight Moonlight in June 2011. The song earned them their second win in Inkigayo and won them a Digital Bonsang award at the 26th Golden Disk Award. In 2012, "Starlight Moonlight" won the Songs of the Year Award in the 1st Gaon Chart Awards for the month of June.

== Concerts and tours ==
- Secret 1st Japan Tour "Secret Time" (2012)
- Secret Live in Singapore (2013)
- The 2nd Japan Tour Love In Secret (2013)
- The 3rd Japan Tour Secret's Summer Live ~YooHoo~ (2014)
- 2015 Secret 1st Fan Meeting in Asia (2015)

== Discography ==
- Moving in Secret (2011)
- Welcome to Secret Time (2012)

== See also ==
- List of best-selling girl groups
