= Bang Yong-guk =

South Korean rapper and singer

- 방용국
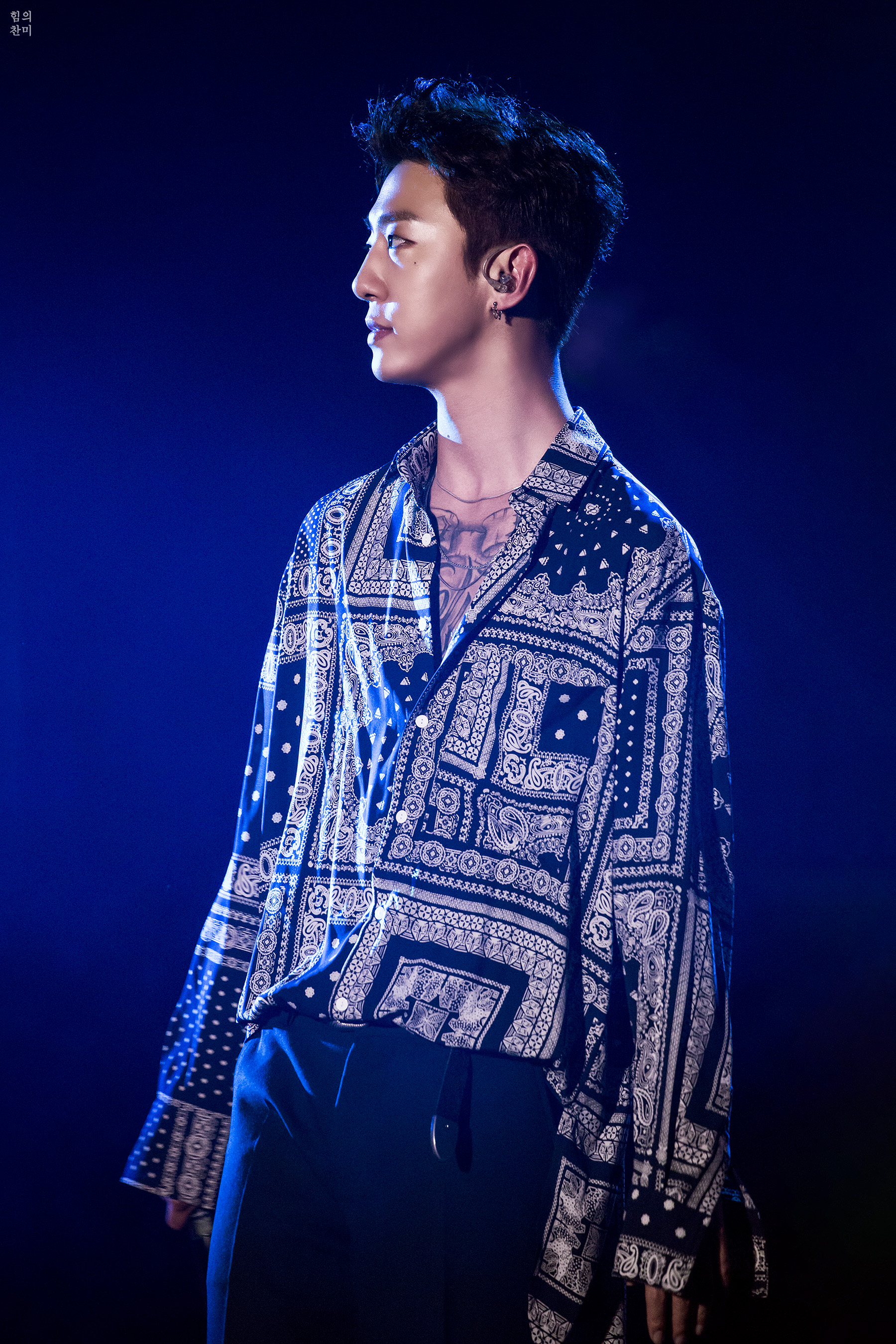
- Bang performing at the LG Dream Festival in Gumi, October 2017
- Born: Bang Yong-guk; March 31, 1990 (age 36); Seoul, South Korea
- Other names: Jepp Blackman; Andrew Baag
- Occupations: Rapper; singer; songwriter; record producer
- Musical career
- Genres: K-pop; hip hop
- Instrument: Vocals
- Years active: 2008–present
- Labels: TS; Consent; YY; PMG
- Member of: B.A.P; Bang & Zelo
- Website: https://bangyongguk.co.kr

Korean name
- Hangul: 방용국
- Hanja: 方容國
- RR: Bang Yongguk
- MR: Pang Yongguk

Bang Yong-guk (Korean: 방용국; born March 31, 1990), also known mononymously as Yongguk (용국), is a South Korean rapper, singer, songwriter, and record producer, who served as the leader of boy group B.A.P up until his departure from TS Entertainment in August 2018.

He made his musical debut in 2008 as a member of an underground hip hop group called Soul Connection under the alias of "Jepp Blackman". In March 2011, he featured on Song Ji-eun's single "Going Crazy", which became a number one hit in South Korea. In July of that year he released his first solo digital single, "I Remember", featuring Beast's Yoseob and in November he promoted in a sub-unit called Bang & Zelo with fellow B.A.P member Zelo, releasing the single "Never Give Up". B.A.P released their first single in January 2012.

== Biography ==
Bang Yong-guk was born in Seoul, South Korea, on March 31, 1990. He is the youngest out of two sons and one daughter in his family. He has an identical twin brother named Yongnam, who has also performed as an underground artist, and an older sister named Natasha, who works as a tattoo artist.

He moved with his family to the coastal Ijak islands of Incheon when he was young, living there for a short period of time before moving back to mainland Incheon. He studied at Gae Woong Elementary School and Gae Woong Middle School, and at 18 graduated from Yuhan High School. He was offered a scholarship for college, which he did not attend.

== Career ==
=== 2008–2011: Career beginnings ===
Bang first began meeting with other members of Soul Connection when he was in his second year of middle school after posting his rap lyrics on an online forum and being recognized for his skill. Through meeting with seniors that were actually active in the music industry, watching them compose and produce, and learning from them, he was able to refine his own techniques and become better at making his style of music

In 2010, Bang was contacted by TS Entertainment to be part of a hip-hop idol group after the duo Untouchable recommended him. Though he was worried that the type of music he could make would be limited, TS Entertainment assured him of being able to live out his dreams. Thus, he joined.

=== 2011: "Going Crazy", "I Remember" and Bang&Zelo ===
On March 3, 2011, Song Ji-eun's single "Going Crazy" was released, featuring Bang. The single was a commercial and critical success, with fans praising Bang's "husky and fiery delivery". It topped the Gaon Music Chart and Gaon Digital and Streaming Chart and gained attention for Bang as an artist; following the single's release, he trended on major portal search sites in South Korea and was requested for multiple broadcast appearances. However, his agency declined these appearances, stating that he was still a trainee and not ready to appear on broadcasts outside of promotional performances. The agency thanked fans for their interest nevertheless.

On August 11, TS Entertainment released Bang's single "I Remember", featuring Yoseob of Beast. The song was a moderate success, peaking in the Top 10 on real time charts in Korea and at #22 on the Gaon Chart. However, the single was deemed unfit for broadcast promotions by KBS because of multiple scenes of shooting and violence.

On December 11, Bang debuted with Zelo as part of the sub-unit rap duo Bang&Zelo with the song "Never Give Up".

=== 2012–2018: B.A.P ===
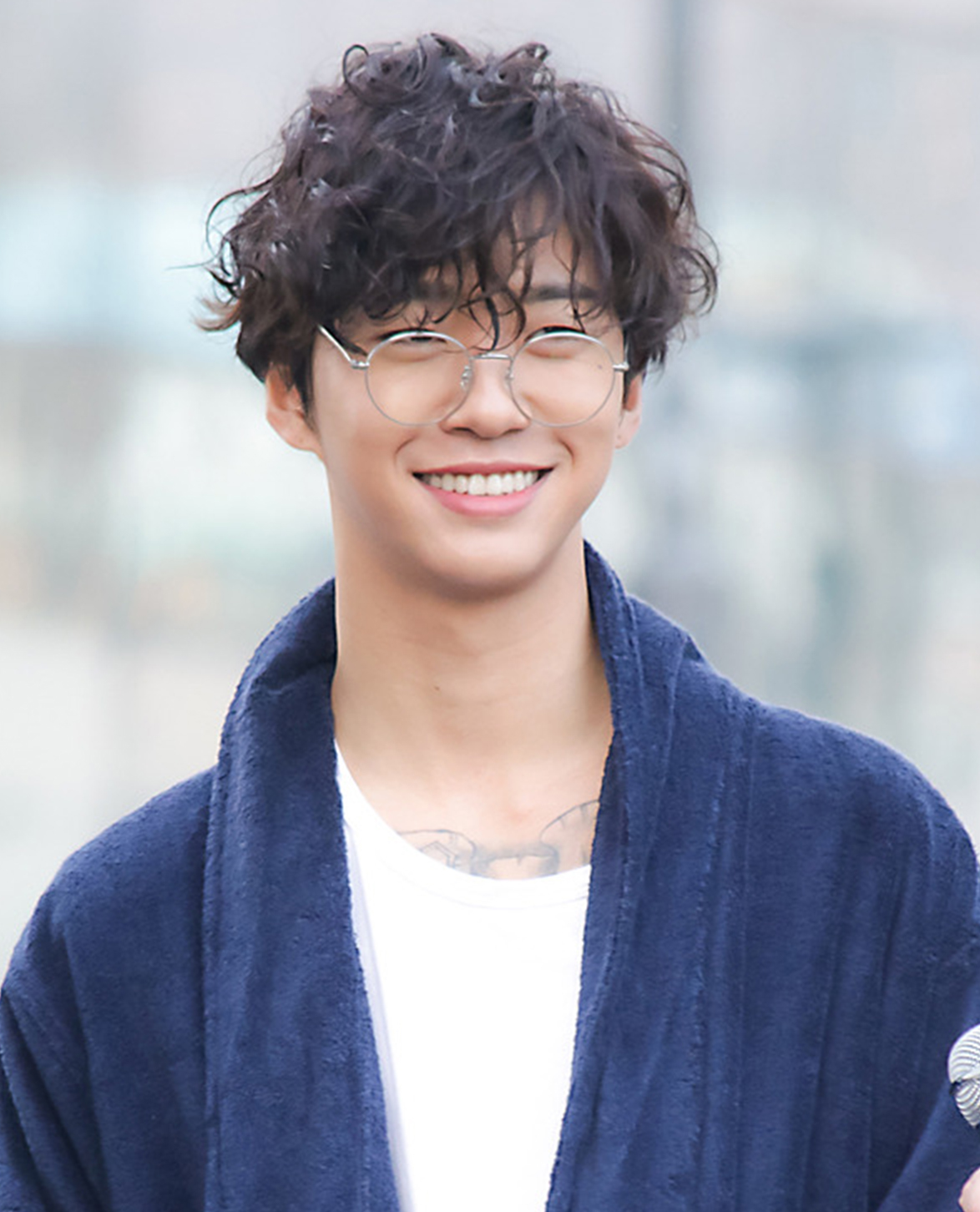
Bang at a fan meeting, March 2017

Bang was the first member to be announced as part of new TS Entertainment boy group B.A.P, of which he acts as the leader and main rapper. The group released its first single, "Warrior", in January 2012. They held their debut showcase in Seoul with over 3,000 attendees on January 28. The single met with critical acclaim, with media outlets describing the single as "powerful and charismatic".

The following year, Bang performed at the 2013 SBS Gayo Daejeon as part of a collaborative hip-hop stage featuring Tiger JK, Yoon Mirae, and Bizzy and also including Zico, RM and Eun Jiwon.

On November 27, 2014, it was reported that all B.A.P members had filed a lawsuit against their label to nullify their contracts, claiming unfair conditions and profit distribution. The group entered a hiatus

On 4 April 2015 during the hiatus, Bang released a solo song titled "AM 4:44".

On August 1, 2015, it was revealed that B.A.P had reached an agreement with and returned to TS Entertainment. B.A.P made their comeback in November 2015 with the mini-album Matrix, produced and written by Bang.

On October 25, 2016, TS Entertainment revealed that Bang will not be participating in the promotions for B.A.P's upcoming full-length album, Noir, due to anxiety disorders.

In April 2017, B.A.P began their six city 'Party Baby- U.S. Boom' tour. Bang returned from his hiatus to join the rest of the boys for the single's promotion, "Wake Me Up".

On July 4, 2017, Bang released a solo track titled "Yamazaki". The track featured lyrics in English, Japanese, and Korean. On April 25, 2018, Bang released the official music video of his solo instrumental track "Portrait", co-directed alongside Joe Brown. On May 25, 2018, Bang released the official music video of his solo track titled "Drunkenness." Which features falsetto vocals provided by fellow band-member Yoo Youngjae. He co-directed the music video alongside Joe Brown.

Following the expiration of Bang's contract on August 19, 2018, with TS Entertainment, he decided to leave the company; B.A.P would continue as 5 members until the expiration of all member contracts, after which all members declined to re-sign with TS Entertainment, going their separate ways.

=== 2018–2020: Solo career, enlistment ===
Following his departure from TS Entertainment, Bang released the MV for single "Hikikomori", a study of his own anxiety and fears facing both the stage and the world itself, with the title taken from the Japanese slang for 'shut-ins' that refuse to go outside due to various stressors.

On February 26, 2019, Bang released "A Short Film About Bang Yongguk]", featuring pre-release track "Journey" to announce his upcoming self-titled solo album. The 13-track album, Bangyongguk, was released March 15, 2019, with lead track "Ya". A MV was filmed for "Ya", but Bang later posted that he had made the decision to "indefinitely postpone" the release due to various factors. Other tracks on "BANG YONGGUK" include re-masters of "AM 4:44" and "Portrait", as well as "Xie Xie" and a remixed version featuring Sway D, Liquor, and rapper LE of girl group EXID.

On June 24, 2019, Bang released photo essay book "The Best Is Yet to Come", a best seller on Korean charts.

Following up, he released single "Orange Drive" as a gift and message to fans prior to his mandatory enlistment period of 2 years.

Bang enlisted in the Korean military as a public service officer on August 1, 2019.

On September 2, 2019, Bang announced through Consent that "Something to Talk About", a documentary he had directed in conjunction with producer Kim Jinbeom, had been selected for screening at the 2019 DMZ International Film Festival. "Something to Talk About" was also nominated under the DMZ Open Cinema category. Covering Bang's experiences as a member of B.A.P as well as his creative process when recording "BANGYONGGUK" and featuring interviews with friends and family, "Something to Talk About" is the first documentary to be produced by an idol.

=== 2021: Consent establishment, "Race" ===
He officially completed his military service on May 18, 2021.

On September 16, 2021, Bang established his one-man agency Consent.

On November 23, 2021, Bang released the new single "Race". It was his first comeback under his own one-man agency.

=== 2022–2024: 2, new agency, "Green", The Colors of Love, 3 ===
On March 2, 2022, Bang released his first EP, 2 and its lead single "Up".

On March 30, 2023, he signed a contract with YY Entertainment. On April 10, Bang will release a new mini album on May 2. On April 12, he announced his comeback with his first (labeled as second) mini album The Colors of Love, set to be released on May 2. A pre-release single, "Green", was released on April 17.

On February 26, 2024, YY Entertainment announced the EP 3, to be released on March 31.

=== 2025–2026: Motion, Nanana, change agency ===
On May 17, 2025, Bang announced "Motion", scheduled for May 26.

On December 23, 2025, Bang announced released single "nanana".

On June 6, 2026, he released the single "If Tomorrow Never Comes" ahead of his second full album.

On August 26, 2026, he announced on Fromm that he had signed with Pacific Music Group Korea following the expiration of his contract with YY Entertainment.

== Artistry and influences ==
Bang is predominantly a hip-hop artist and cites 50 Cent, P. Diddy, and Pharrell as musical influences. Although his goal was not initially to become a K-pop artist, he was influenced by the roles that Supreme Team and Dynamic Duo played in popularizing the genre in South Korea. His voice type has been described as baritone.

Bang also pulls influence from jazz and blues as well as rock/metal and alt-rock.

As well as rapping, Bang also acts as a songwriter and producer for many of B.A.P's songs, including all the tracks from their debut EP Warrior as well as tracks on various albums including Noir, Carnival, and Matrix. Furthermore, Bang is the lyricist for all B.A.P's songs, and takes influence from his life as well as world events. Bang identifies as a pacifist, and is vocal about his own struggles with mental health as well as his concern for the state of the world. Many of his lyrics openly criticise society, government, companies, and those that take advantage of power or influence to discriminate against others.

Bang drew inspiration for his solo album Bang Yongguk from the contents of his own diary. A personal album, songs on the album range from rage to loss to confrontations on depression and anxiety, to his own loneliness. The track "See You Later" is taken from a draft will as written in his diary.

Bang is credited on his self-titled album as executive producer, lyricist, track producer, and art director, and self-directs videos for his solo work from conception to editing.

== Discography ==
=== Studio albums ===
List of studio albums, with selected details, chart positions and sales
Title	Details	Peak chart positions	Sales
Title	Details	KOR	Sales
BANGYONGGUK	Released: March 15, 2019; Label: Consent; Formats: CD, LP, digital download, streaming; Track listing: 1. "Diary" - 2:31; 2. "I Need to Talk (대화가 필요해)"; 3. "Hikikomori (히키코모리)"; 4. "Hot and Cold (모조리)" (feat. Sogumm); 5. "Ya (야해)"; 6. "Holiday" (feat. Paul Given); 7. "Journey (여행)"; 8. "Portrait (Re-Mastered)"; 9. "Codex Gigas"; 10. "AM 4:44 (Re-Mastered)"; 11. "Xie Xie"; 12. "See You Later"; 13. "I Need to Talk (대화가 필요해) (Instrumental)"; 14. "AM 4:44 (Instrumental)"; 15. "Xie Xie (Remix)" (feat. Sway D, Liquor, & LE)	61	KOR: 1,231

=== Extended plays ===
List of charted EPs, with selected details, chart positions and sales
Title	Details	Peak chart positions	Sales
Title	Details	KOR	Sales
2	Released: March 2, 2022; Label: YY Entertainment, Consent; Formats: CD, digital download, streaming; Track listing: 1. "G.M.T"; 2. "Up"; 3. "Screwed Up"; 4. "Shut Up (싲)"; 5. "Off"; 6. "Race"	12	KOR: +12,455
The Colors of Love	Released: May 2, 2023; Label: YY Entertainment, Consent; Formats: CD, digital download, streaming; Track listing: 1. "Ride or Die"; 2. "Breath (숨)"; 3. "Green" (feat. Soovi); 4. "Rain On Me" (feat. COE); 5. "UFO"; 6. "I Don't Care"	18	KOR: 6,649
3	Released: March 31, 2024; Label: YY Entertainment, Consent; Formats: CD, digital download, streaming; Track listing: 1. "Movimento"; 2. "Bad (feat. Youha)"; 3. "IXLU"; 4. "Numb"; 5. "Buss It Down" -; 6. "IXLU (Clean ver.)"	39	KOR: 6,630

=== Singles ===
List of digital singles, with selected chart positions
Year	Title	Peak chart positions	Album
Year	Title	KOR	Album
2008	"Cherry Flower" (with Soul Connection)	—	Cherry Flower
2011	"I Remember" (featuring Yang Yo-seob)	22	Non-album singles
2011	"Never Give Up" (with Bang&Zelo)	65	Non-album singles
2015	"AM 4:44"	—	Non-album singles
2016	"X"	—	Non-album singles
2017	"Yamazaki"	—	Non-album singles
2018	"Portrait"	—	Non-album singles
2018	"Drunkenness"	—	Non-album singles
2019	"Hikikomori"	—	Bangyongguk
2019	"Ya"	—	Bangyongguk
2019	"Coming Home"	—	Non-album singles
2019	"Orange Drive"	—	Non-album singles
2021	"Race"	—	2
2022	"Up"	—	2
2023	"Green" (featuring Soovi)	—	The Colors Of Love
2023	"Ride Or Die"	—	The Colors Of Love
2024	"Bad" (featuring Youha)	—	3
2024	"Novimiento"	—	3
2024	"IXLU"	—	3
2024	"Numb"	—	3
2024	"Buss It"	—	3
2025	"Motion"	—	Non-album singles
2025	"nanana"	—	Non-album singles
2026	"If Tomorrow Never Comes"	—	Non-album singles
"—" denotes releases that did not chart or were not released in that region.

==== As a featured artist ====
List of singles as featured artist
Year	Title	Peak chart positions	Album
Year	Title	KOR	Album
2011	"Going Crazy" (with Song Jieun)	1	Non-album single

=== Music videos ===
List of music videos by Bang Yong-guk
Year	Music video	Length
2011	"Going Crazy"	4:23
2011	"I Remember"	4:23
2011	"Never Give Up"	4:27
2012	"For a Year"	5:02
2015	"AM 4:44"	4:30
2017	"Yamazaki"	4:01
2018	"Portrait"	3:36
2018	"Drunkenness"	4:30
2019	"Hikikomori"	3:55
2019	"A Short Film About Bang Yongguk '여행' (Journey)"	3:51
2019	"Coming Home (Special Clip)"	3:52
2019	"Orange Drive"	3:15
2021	"Race"	3:25
2022	"Up"	3:07
2023	"Ride Or Die"	3:21

== Filmography ==
=== Film ===
Filmography of Bang Yong-guk
Year	Title	Role	Notes
2011	Mr. Idol	Cameo	Himself with Kim Him-chan
2019	Something to Talk About	Main	Self-directed documentary

== World tours, concerts ==
- Bang Yongguk 1st Global Fan Meet-up [Bangstergram] (2022)
- The Colors of Bang Japan 2023 (2023)
- The Colors of Bang Yongguk The US Tour 2023 (2023)
- The Colors of Bang Yongguk The Europe & Asia Tour 2023 (2023)
- Bang Yongguk 'Ⅲ' The US Tour 2024 (2024)
- 2025 Bang Yong Guk Concert [Monologue] (2025)
- Bang Yongguk 2026 World Tour "Haebang" (2026)

== Awards and nominations ==
List of awards and nominations received by Bang Yong-guk
Year	Award	Category	Result
2014	Shorty Awards	Social Media's Best Musician	Nominated
2015	KMC Radio Awards	Idol of the Year	Won
2015	Shorty Awards	Social Media's Best Musician	Nominated
