= Teaching Practice: Idiot Girls and School Ghost 2 =

2025 South Korean comedy horror film

- Main poster
- Hangul: 교생실습
- RR: Gyosaengsilseup
- MR: Kyosaengsilsŭp
- Directed by: Kim Min-ha
- Screenplay by: Kim Min-ha
- Produced by: Park Se-joon; Gu Sung-mok; Kim Jong-min
- Starring: Han Sun-hwa; Hong Ye-ji; Lee Yeo-reum; Lee Hwa-won; Yoo Seon-ho
- Cinematography: Lee Hyun-jin
- Edited by: Kim Min-ha
- Music by: Lee Geon-ho
- Production companies: 26 Company; Contents G.
- Distributed by: Studio Santa Claus Entertainment
- Release dates: July 5, 2025 (BIFAN); May 13, 2026 (South Korea)
- Running time: 94 minutes
- Country: South Korea
- Language: Korean
- Box office: US$212,600

Teaching Practice: Idiot Girls and School Ghost 2 (Korean: 교생실습) is a 2025 South Korean independent satirical comedy horror film written and directed by Kim Min-ha, and starring Han Sun-hwa, Hong Ye-ji, Lee Yeo-reum, Lee Hwa-won, and Yoo Seon-ho. It is a standalone sequel to the 2024 film Idiot Girls and School Ghost: School Anniversary. The film had its world premiere at the 29th Bucheon International Fantastic Film Festival (BIFAN) on July 5, 2025. It was released exclusively in CGV theatres on May 13, 2026.

The film blends horror and comedy to reflect on the collapse of teacher authority and public education, as well as the disappearance of Korea’s traditional educational institutions, with a student teacher, played by actress Han Sun-hwa, serving as the central protagonist, who must navigate these challenges to protect her students.

== Plot ==
Kang Eun-kyung (Han Sun-hwa), who has come for her teaching practicum, encounters members of the Kuroi Sora club, also called the Black Sky black magic Club, who are ranked first in the national mock exams. She discovers that a Japanese samurai ghost named Idainashi (Yoo Seon-ho) has lived for over 400 years and is behind the girls. The ghost feeds on students' souls to maintain its youth in exchange for granting them the ability to excel in exams. To retrieve the souls the ghost has taken, Eun-kyung opens the door to the world of darkness. She must survive a ghostly version of the mock exam, which takes the form of a deadly game, in order to rescue the students who have traded their souls for higher grades.

== Cast ==
- Han Sun-hwa as Kang Eun-kyung, the student teacher
- Hong Ye-ji as Aoi / Kim Ji-soo, the club leader
- Lee Yeo-reum as Riko / Park Saet-byeol, the club vice-leader
- Lee Hwa-won as Haruka / Jung Min-ji, the third member of the club
- Yoo Seon-ho as Idainashi, the ghost
- Kim Hyun as Choi Suk-kyung, Eun-kyung's mentor
- Pi Ji-yung as the class president
- Park Chul-min as the Principal
- Han Ga-ram as Jeong-ah, a bully student
- Jung Man-sik as Jeong-ah's dad
- Kil Chang-gyu as traditional village school teacher

== Production ==
During its development stage in July 2024, the project participated in the 17th Network of Asian Fantastic Films (NAFF) Project Market, where it won the NAFF Korean Award and a cash prize of KRW 5 million.

Teaching Practice: Idiot Girls and School Ghost 2 was produced with a reduced budget of about one quarter of its predecessor, Idiot Girls and School Ghost: School Anniversary, to improve cost efficiency and increase the likelihood of breaking even through its target audience. As a micro-budget horror-comedy with satirical elements, the film was aimed at a more specialized audience than mainstream theatrical releases.

Principal photography began on February 10, 2025, and concluded on March 13, 2025.

The film was included in the 2025 Cannes Film Market lineup.

== Release ==
=== Film festivals ===
Teaching Practice: Idiot Girls and School Ghost 2 was officially invited to the 29th Bucheon International Fantastic Film Festival. The tickets for all the screenings for the film were sold out in approximately 4 minutes and 30 seconds after ticket sales opened on June 26, 2025. It had its world premiere on July 5, 2025, in the Korean Fantastic: Features section.

The film won 2 awards, including the Korean Fantatic Film Award and the Korean Fantastic Actor Award (Han Sun-hwa), at the festival's closing ceremony on July 11, 2025, at the Bucheon City Hall Plaza, where the awards ceremony was held.

The film was also screened at the Kaohsiung Film Festival (2025) - Super Scary Pranks Party section, at the 51st Seoul Independent Film Festival: SIFF (2025) - Festival Choice section, and at the 27th Jeonju International Film Festival: JIFF (2026) - Special Screening: JEONJU X Meet section.

=== Theatrical release ===
Teaching Practice: Idiot Girls and School Ghost 2 was released exclusively in CGV theatres on May 13, 2026, in South Korea by Studio Santa Claus Entertainment.

== Box office ==
The film was released on May 13, 2026, on 253 screens. It opened at No. 1 on the independent and art-house box office upon its release.

According to the Korean Box Office Information System (KOBIS), as of July 30, 2026, the film has grossed US$212,600 from 34,679 admissions.

== Accolades ==
Award ceremony	Year	Category	Nominee	Result	Ref.
Bechdel Day	2026	Bechdel Choice 10 — Film	Teaching Practice: Idiot Girls and School Ghost 2	Won	
Bucheon International Fantastic Film Festival	2025	Korean Fantastic Film	Teaching Practice: Idiot Girls and School Ghost 2	Won	
Bucheon International Fantastic Film Festival	2025	Korean Fantastic Actor	Han Sun-hwa	Won	
