= When Winter Comes =

When Winter Comes may refer to:

- When Winter Comes (2022 film), South Korean romantic drama film
- When Winter Comes, a 2017 album by Sofia Talvik
- "When Winter Comes", a 1939 song by Irving Berlin
- "When Winter Comes", a song from the 2019 album When the Camellia Blooms
- "When Winter Comes", a song from the 2020 album McCartney III
- "When Winter Comes", a 1965 song by Wally Whyton
- When Winter Comes, a 1955 sculpture by Indian sculptor D. P. Roy Choudhury
