= Yoo Seon-ho =

South Korean actor (born 2002)

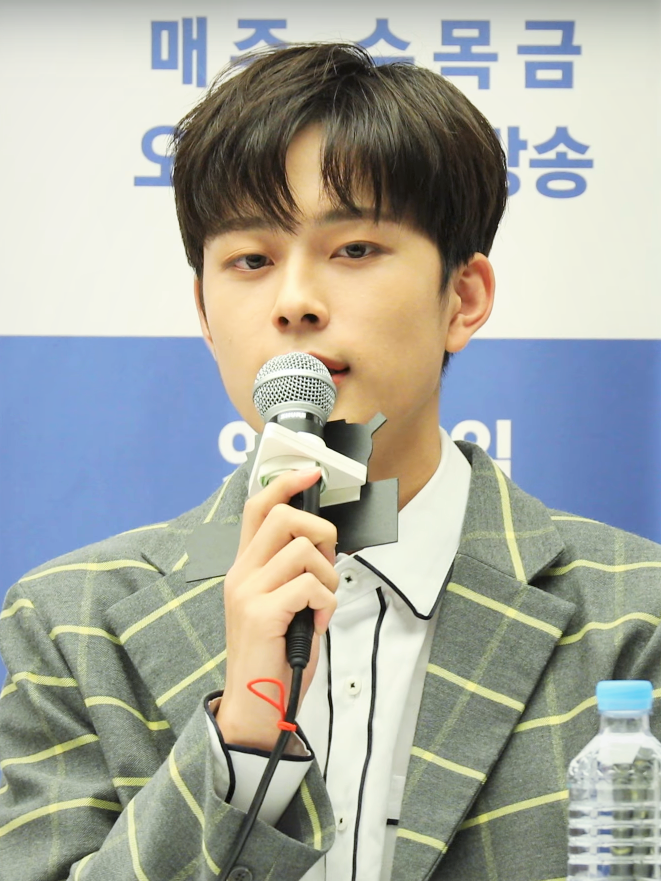
- Yoo in September 2018
- Born: January 28, 2002 (age 24); Incheon, South Korea
- Occupations: Actor; singer; model
- Musical career
- Genre: K-pop
- Instrument: Vocals
- Years active: 2017–present
- Labels: Cube; Universal Japan; Hiin Entertainment

Korean name
- Hangul: 유선호
- Hanja: 柳善皓
- RR: Yu Seonho
- MR: Yu Sŏnho

Yoo Seon-ho (born January 28, 2002) is a South Korean actor, singer, and model. He is best known as a contestant on the survival reality show Produce 101 season 2 and acting in the drama Under the Queen's Umbrella. He has been a cast member of the variety show 2 Days & 1 Night since 2022.

== Early life and education ==
Yoo was born on January 28, 2002, in Seoul, South Korea. He is an alumnus of Hanlim Multi Art School.

== Career ==
=== 2017: Acting debut ===
Soon after Produce 101 ended, Yoo became a regular guest on a new variety show called Special Private Life together with other fellow Produce 101 contestants. He also had guest appearances in variety shows like Live Talk Show Taxi and Problematic Men. In August 2017, Yoo started appearing as a regular guest for a few episode on Channel A's Let's Eat Out This Saturday. From July to August 2017, Yoo along with BtoB's Yook Sung-jae promoted for TMON's Let's Fly TMON Tour campaign.

On August 3 it was revealed that Yoo would make his acting debut in the web-drama Mischievous Detectives alongside Apink's Namjoo and fellow Produce 101 Contestant Ahn Hyung Seob. Yoo played the role of Pyo Han Eum, an honorary forensic investigator that was awarded for solving a murder case. The web-drama surpassed 10 million views in a month on Naver. Yoo acted as the main protagonist, along with Shuhua in 10cm's music video for the song Pet, having been chosen by the singer himself.

In October 2017, Yoo was part of the main cast of the beauty variety show The Cushion together with BtoB's Jung Il-hoon and popular Korean beauty YouTuber Lena.

Yoo held his first fanmeet The Most Preferred Time on October 27 at the Woori Art Hall in Seoul's Olympic Park. The fanmeet sold out in less than five minutes which saw Cube Entertainment adding a second date, on October 28.

On October 20, was revealed that Yoo will guest on One Night Food Trip alongside his label mate, Pentagon's Hui, the filming started in Vietnam on October 22. Seonho was confirmed as part of variety show cast tvN's Nest Escape 2, with filming taking place in Greece.

=== 2018–present: Solo debut and activities ===
Yoo joined the cast of variety show Photo People 2 with filming taking place in Japan in March 2018.

After finishing his fan meeting tour in Osaka, Hong Kong, Taiwan, Bangkok and Tokyo on December 23, 2017, he held an encore fanmeeting at Olympic Hall, Olympic Park in Seoul on April 14 with 2500 seats which was sold out in 1 minute.

Yoo made his solo debut with EP Spring, Seonho on April 11, 2018, with the lead single "Maybe Spring" composed by Lee Jin-ah.

In July 2018 it was revealed that he will return to play Pyo Han Eum in Mischievous Detective Season 2. Seonho was also cast in variety show JTBC's Carefree Travellers as fixed cast. Yoo became the model for Goobne a chicken brand. A CF like a youth movie was released starring Yoo Seonho, which surpassed 3.4 million views.

In 2019, Yoo, alongside Lai Kuan-lin and Ha Neul were chosen as new models for TBJ clothing brand. On June 10, Yoo became the ambassador for Korea Pediatric Diabetes Association alongside (G)I-dle.

In December 2019, Seon-ho became a regular guest in SBS's basketball variety show Handsome Tigers. The show premiered in January 2020. Later in December, Seonho was cast in tvN's new variety show Cat's Meow Is Fake, the show was aired on January 5, 2020.

In 2021, Yoo joined JTBC drama Undercover, playing the son of Ji Jin-hee and Kim Hyun-joo, who has autism.

In 2022, Yoo returned to the small screen with the MBC drama Doctor Lawyer, playing the teenage So Ji-sub. Later he joined the tvN historical drama Under the Queen's Umbrella, which was broadcast in October 2022. The same year, Yoo became a fixed cast member of the KBS2 reality show 2 Days & 1 Night Season 4, with his first episode airing in December.

On September 12, 2024, it was officially announced that Yoo had left Cube Entertainment after his contract expired. The next day, it was announced that he signed with Hiin Entertainment.

In 2025, Yoo joined the main cast of the independent satirical comedy horror film Teaching Practice: Idiot Girls and School Ghost 2, led by Han Sun-hwa, reuniting with her after both appeared in the 2021 drama Undercover.

== Other ventures ==
=== Ambassadorship ===
In 2019, Yoo was public relations ambassador of Korea Pediatric Diabetes Association with boyband Pentagon.

=== Endorsements ===
In between 2017 and 2019, Yoo has endorsed TMON Tour Nalja Titu, Goodal, GS25, Acuvue, TMRW, Goobne, and TBJ.

== Personal life ==
In January 2026, it was confirmed that Yoo is in a relationship with actress Shin Eun-soo. The two reportedly met through a gathering of acquaintances.

== Discography ==
=== Extended plays ===
List of extended plays, with selected chart positions and sales
Title	Details	Peak chart positions	Sales
Title	Details	KOR	Sales
Spring, Seonho	Released: April 11, 2018; Label: Cube Entertainment; Formats: CD, digital download; Track listing: 1. Prelude: I Think Of You (너를 생각해); 2. Maybe Spring (봄이 오면); 3. A Blue Star (푸른 별 하나); 4. I Miss You (보고 싶어); 5. Maybe Spring (봄이 오면) (Inst.)	9	KOR: 14,818

=== Singles ===
Title	Year	Peak chart positions	Album
Title	Year	KOR	Album
"Maybe Spring" (봄이 오면)	2018	— (Note: "Maybe Spring" did not enter the Gaon Digital Chart, but appeared at number 98 on the component Download chart.)	Spring, Seonho
"—" denotes a recording that did not chart or was not released in that territory.

=== Soundtrack appearances ===
Title	Year	Album
"Forever Smile"	2021	The Great Shaman Ga Doo-shim OST Part 3

=== Collaborations ===
Title	Year	Other artist(s)	Album
"Follow Your Dreams" (한걸음)	2018	Hyuna, Jo Kwon, BtoB, CLC, Pentagon, (G)I-dle	One
"Upgrade"	2018	Hyuna, Jo Kwon, BtoB, CLC, Pentagon, (G)I-dle	One
"Young & One"	2018	Hyuna, Jo Kwon, BtoB, CLC, Pentagon, (G)I-dle	One

== Filmography ==
=== Film ===
Year	Title	Role	Ref.
2023	Usury Academy	Kang Jin	
2024	How Have You Been	Other Youth	
2025	Teaching Practice: Idiot Girls and School Ghost 2	Idainashi	

=== Television series ===
Year	Title	Role	Notes	Ref.
2018	Big Forest	Lee Jong-man	Cameo (Episode 1–2)	
2018–2019	My Strange Hero	Yoo Shi-on		
2020	Turtle Channel	Sang-doo	KBS Drama Special	
2021	Undercover	Han Seung-goo		
2022	Doctor Lawyer	young Han Yi-han		
2022	Under the Queen's Umbrella	Grand Prince Gye-seong		
2023–2024	The Story of Park's Marriage Contract	Kang Tae-min		
2025	Oh My Ghost Clients	Heo Yoon-jae		

=== Web series ===
Year	Title	Role	Notes	Ref.
2017	Mischievous Detectives	Pyo Han-eum	9 episodes	
2017	The Cushion	Yoo Seon-ho		
2018	Rebel / Mischievous Detectives Season 2	Pyo Han-eum		
2021	The Great Shaman Ga Doo-shim	Hyun-soo		
2021–2022	The World of My 17	Joo Chan-yang	Season 2	

=== Reality shows ===
Year	Title	Episodes	Ref.
2018–present	Seonorang (서노랑)	Ongoing	
2019	Seonho Channel (선호채널)	8 + 2 Specials	
2020–2021	Seonho's Everyday (나날의 선호)	28	

=== Television shows ===
Year	Title	Role	Notes	Ref.
2017	Produce 101 Season 2	Contestant		
2017	Heyo TV Private Life	Private life of PRINSIX	4 Episodes	
2017	Problematic Men	Contestant	Episode 124	
2017	One Night Food Trip	Contestant	Episode 40–43	
2018	Nest Escape	Main cast	Season 2 and 3	
2018	Carefree Travellers	Main cast	Episode 1-4 Season 2	
2019	Thought of Children	Main cast		
2019	Taiwan Foodtalk	Main cast		
2020	Handsome Tigers	Cast Member		
2020	Cat's Meow Is Fake	Main cast		
2022–2026	2 Days & 1 Night	Cast Member	Season 4	

=== Web show ===
Year	Title	Role	Ref.
2018	Photo People season 2	Main cast	

=== Hosting ===
Year	Title	Notes	Ref.
2019	Hanlim Multi Arts School Entrance Ceremony		
2019–2020	Idol Dabang (아이돌다방; Idol Cafe)	With Andy of Shinhwa	

== Awards and nominations ==
Name of the award ceremony, year presented, category, nominee of the award, and the result of the nomination
Award ceremony	Year	Category	Nominee / Work	Result	Ref.
Asia Artist Awards	2023	Potential Award	Yoo Seon-ho	Won	
Gaon Chart Music Awards	2018	New Artist of the Year	Yoo Seon-ho	Nominated	
KBS Entertainment Awards	2023	Grand Prize Award (Daesang)	2 Days & 1 Night 4	Won	
KBS Entertainment Awards	2023	Rookie of the Year (Show and Variety)	2 Days & 1 Night 4	Won	
KBS Entertainment Awards	2023	Entertainer of the Year	2 Days & 1 Night 4	Won	
KBS Entertainment Awards	2025	Excellence Award (Show and Variety)	2 Days & 1 Night 4	Won	
Korean Brand and Model Award	2017	Model Grand Prize	Yoo Seon-ho	Won	
MBC Drama Awards	2023	Best New Actor	The Story of Park's Marriage Contract	Nominated	
Melon Music Awards	2018	Best New Male Artist	Yoo Seon-ho	Nominated	
Seoul Webfest Awards	2019	Best Actor	Rebel / Mischievous Detectives Season 2	Nominated	
V Live Awards	2019	Global Rookie Top 5	Yoo Seon-ho	Won	
