= Idiot Girls and School Ghost: School Anniversary =

2024 South Korean comedy horror film

- Theatrical poster
- Hangul: 아메바 소녀들과 학교괴담: 개교기념일
- RR: Ameba sonyeodeulgwa hakgyo goedam: gaegyoginyeomil
- MR: Ameba sonyŏdŭlgwa hakkyo koedam: kaegyoginyŏmil
- Directed by: Kim Min-ha
- Screenplay by: Kim Min-ha
- Produced by: Park Se-joon; Kim Jong-min
- Starring: Kim Do-yeon; Son Ju-yeon; Jeong Ha-dam; Kang Shin-hee
- Cinematography: Lee Hyun-jin
- Edited by: Kim Min-ha
- Music by: Lee Geon-ho
- Production company: 26 Company
- Distributed by: Studio Santa Claus Entertainment
- Release dates: July 7, 2024 (BIFAN); November 6, 2024 (South Korea)
- Running time: 90 minutes
- Country: South Korea
- Language: Korean
- Box office: US$178,458

Idiot Girls and School Ghost: School Anniversary (Korean: 아메바 소녀들과 학교괴담: 개교기념일) is a 2024 South Korean independent satirical comedy horror film written and directed by Kim Min-ha, and starring Kim Do-yeon, Son Ju-yeon, Jeong Ha-dam, and Kang Shin-hee. The film had its world premiere at the 28th Bucheon International Fantastic Film Festival (BIFAN) on July 7, 2024. It had its theatrical release on November 6, 2024.

The film blends horror and comedy in a school ghost story to satirize Korea’s exam-centered education system, highlighting the extreme pressure and high stakes faced by students.

It was followed by a standalone sequel, Teaching Practice: Idiot Girls and School Ghost 2, which premiered in July 2025.

== Plot ==
A group of high school senior girls discovers a 'Ghost Hide-and-Seek' videotape recorded by their seniors in the broadcasting club. Through the tape, the girls learn about a rumor that if they survive and win in the cursed ghosts' hide-and-seek game on the night of the upcoming school anniversary, they can receive a perfect score on the college entrance exam.

== Cast ==
- Kim Do-yeon as Ji-yeon, an aspiring film director
- Son Ju-yeon as Eun-byul, an aspiring actress
- Jeong Ha-dam as Min-joo, a Japanese culture otaku
- Kang Shin-hee as Hyun-jung, an aspiring cinematographer
- Ha Seo-yul as Willy Minky, the ghost
- Lee Eun-hee as legendary Buddhist nun
- Ko Kyu-pil as science teacher
- Jeon So-min as homeroom teacher
- Lee Jun-hyeok as school nurse
- Yang Chi-seung as night study supervisor teacher

== Production ==
During its development stage in July 2023, the project participated in the 16th Network of Asian Fantastic Films (NAFF) Project Market, where it won the NAFF Korean Award and a cash prize of KRW 10 million.

== Release ==
=== Film festivals ===
On July 7, 2024, the film had its world premiere at the 28th Bucheon International Fantastic Film Festival in the Korean Fantastic: Features section.

The film had its screening at various film festivals such as, 57th Sitges International Fantastic Film Festival of Catalonia (2024) - Sitges Family - Fantastic Teens in Spain, Kaohsiung Film Festival (2024) - Annual Theme: Trapped in Youth in Taiwan, Jakarta Film Week (2024) - FANTASEA in Indonesia, Lund International Fantastic Film Festival: LIFFF (2024) in Sweden, 21st Jecheon International Music & Film Festival: JIMFF (2025) in South Korea, Weird Weekender International Film Festival Stuttgart: IFFS (2025) in Germany, and Yangpyeong Bridge Film Festival (2026) in South Korea.

=== Theatrical release ===
It was released theatrically on November 6, 2024, in South Korea by Studio Santa Claus Entertainment.

== Box Office ==
The film was released on 203 screens on November 6, 2024.

According to the Korean Box Office Information System (KOBIS), as of August 11, 2025, the film's total gross is US$178,458 from 30,109 admissions.

== Accolades ==
Award ceremony	Year	Category	Nominee	Result	Ref.
Blue Dragon Film Awards	2025	Best New Actress	Kim Do-yeon	Won	
Blue Dragon Film Awards	2025	Best New Director	Kim Min-ha	Nominated	
Bucheon International Fantastic Film Festival	2024	Korean Fantastic Director	Kim Min-ha	Won	
Bucheon International Fantastic Film Festival	2024	Watcha's Pick	Idiot Girls and School Ghost: School Anniversary	Won	
Jecheon International Music & Film Festival	2025	Music Insight Jury Special Mention	Lee Geon-ho	Won	
Wildflower Film Awards	2025	Best Low-Budget Genre Film	Idiot Girls and School Ghost: School Anniversary	Nominated	
