= The Skin House =

South Korean cosmetics company

- Company type: Public
- Founded: 1979
- Headquarters: Seoul, South Korea
- Area served: Worldwide
- Products: Beauty products
- Website: theskinhouse.co.kr

The Skin House (Korean: 더스킨하우스) is a cosmetics company founded in 1979. It is located at Seoul, South Korea.

== History ==
The Skin House cosmetics company was founded in Seoul, South Korea in 1979. In April 2011, Han Sunhwa of Secret was chosen as the new model for The Skin House. A representative of the brand commented, “The Skin House uses natural and organic ingredients and is one of the top brands in the nation for those with sensitive skin. With Secret’s Sunhwa at our forefront, we’ll be making sure that everyone can have healthy, youthful skin with our natural products.”
