= Cinema Street =

2021 South romantic comedy melodrama drama film

- Theatrical poster
- Hangul: 영화의 거리
- RR: Yeonghwaui geori
- MR: Yŏnghwaŭi kŏri
- Directed by: Kim Min-geun
- Screenplay by: Kim Min-geun; Kim Ye-sol
- Starring: Han Sun-hwa; Lee Wan
- Cinematography: Park Cheon-hyeon
- Edited by: Kim Min-geun
- Music by: Kim Hyung-bin
- Production company: Noon Company
- Distributed by: Cinesopa Film Distribution Cooperative
- Release date: September 16, 2021
- Running time: 77 minutes
- Country: South Korea
- Language: Korean

Cinema Street (Korean: 영화의 거리) is a 2021 South Korean independent romantic comedy melodrama drama film directed by Kim Min-geun, and starring Han Sun-hwa and Lee Wan. It was selected for the Busan Film Distribution Support Project, supported by the Busan Creative Economy Innovation Center and the Busan Cinema Center. The film portrays the slapstick romance between two characters who are ex-lovers as they meet, love, break up, and meet again through work. It had its theatrical release on September 16, 2021.

== Plot ==
Sun-hwa and Do-young reunited in Busan as film location manager and director, respectively. The romance between the ex-lovers who broke up and met through work is over, but it doesn't seem like it's over. Another falling-in-love romance begins at the workplace with extended flashbacks to their past relationship and a couple of comedic meetings with family members, who play ignorant but obviously know what is going on.

== Cast ==
- Han Sun-hwa as Gil Sun-hwa, a film location manager
- Lee Wan as Cha Do-young, a film director
- Park Se-ki as Hae-sol, a production company CEO
- Nam Gi-hyung as a cinematographer
- Yoo Min-gon as an assistant director
- Kim Ri-hyun as an assistant director
- Jung Ma-rin as grandmother
- Kim Shin-bi as Soo-hyeon
- Lee Chang-won as Eun-ho
- Seo In-soo as a village resident

== Release ==
Cinema Street was released theatrically on September 16, 2021, in South Korea by Cinesopa Film Distribution Cooperative.

== Box Office ==
As of October 10, 2021, the total admissions is 1,971.
