= Kwak Min-gyu =

South Korean actor (born 1987)

Kwak Min-kyu
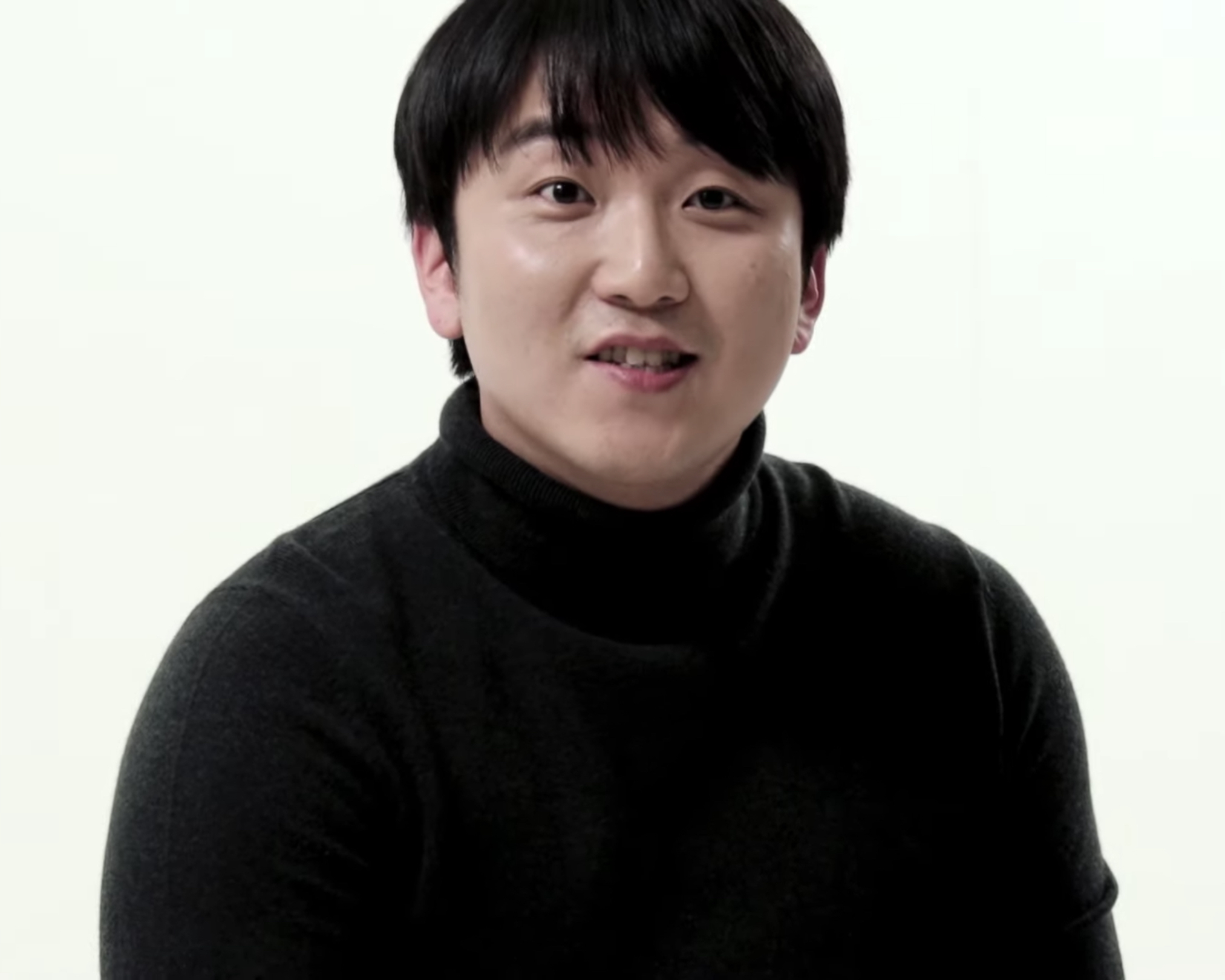
- Kwak in December 2020
- Born: October 1, 1987 (age 39); South Korea
- Education: Konkuk University
- Occupations: Actor; director
- Years active: 2013–present
- Agent: Prain TPC

Korean name
- Hangul: 곽민규
- RR: Gwak Mingyu
- MR: Kwak Min'gyu

Kwak Min-kyu (Korean: 곽민규; born on October 1, 1987) is a South Korean actor and director known for his work in independent cinema. He gained critical recognition for his performance in Teardrop, winning Best Actor at the Jeonbuk Independent Film Festival. Kwak further established himself with the film Move the Grave, which earned him the Best New Actor award at the 40th Korean Association of Film Critics Awards and a nomination in the same category at the 26th Chunsa Film Art Awards. His role in The Boy from Nowhere resulted in Best Actor Awards at both the Jeonju International Film Festival and the Wildflower Film Awards. In addition to his acting career, Kwak received the Encouragement Award at the 4th Bacchus 29-Second Film Festival in 2016 for his short film as a director.

== Career ==
Kwak graduated from Konkuk University with a degree from the Department of Film. He made his professional debut in the 2013 short film Young Artists. Since then, he has developed a diverse filmography through roles in various independent films, including Do You Like Stephen Chow, Too?, The Boy from Nowhere, and Move the Grave.

In the film When Winter Comes, Kwak stars as the protagonist Seok-woo. The story follows Seok-woo as he copes with a difficult breakup by leaving his career as a film director in Seoul to work as a bus driver in his hometown of Jinhae. His subsequent projects include a role in the drama series Summer Strike. On November 22, 2022, it was announced that Kwak had signed an exclusive management contract with the agency Prain TPC.

His performance as Park In-su PD in Can This Love Be Translated? was praised. As Romantic Trip assistant director he played an important part as love mediator between Joo Ho-jin and Cha Mu-hee.

== Personal life ==
Kwak married his non-celebrity wife on November 16, 2025 in Seoul.

== Filmography ==
Key
| † | Denotes films that have not yet been released |

=== Film ===
Feature film appearances
| Year | Title | Role | Note(s) | Ref. |
|---|---|---|---|---|
| 2013 | Young Artists | Young-tae | Bit part | |
| 2014 | 18: Eighteen Noir | Bucheon High School gang 3 | | |
| 2014 | Foot Volleyball King | Marine Patrol | | |
| 2014 | Mountain | Senior Hyun | | |
| 2015 | The Phone | Cheonggyecheon Police 3 | | |
| 2015 | A Black Pig | Min-chul | | |
| 2016 | Match Manipulation | DOPS #07 | | |
| 2016 | Her Way of Saying Goodbye | | | |
| 2016 | Bboongbang Bboongppong Doll Theater | Tiger | | |
| 2017 | Rake | Ki-cheol | | |
| 2017 | Do you like Stephen Chow too? | Min-gyu | | |
| 2017 | Janggi King: Garak Market Revolution | Reporter 2 | | |
| 2018 | Hongkong Melo | Min-gyu | | |
| 2018 | Teardrop | Hong-min | | |
| 2018 | Back from the Beat | Min-gyu | | |
| 2020 | Move the Grave | Baek Seung-rak | | |
| 2020 | The Boy From Nowhere | Kim Soo | | |
| 2021 | When Winter Comes | Gong Seok-woo | | |
| 2022 | Sophie's World | Jong-gu | | |
| 2023 | Concrete Utopia | Exam takers | Bit part | |
| 2023 | The Conversation | Pil-jae | Lead role | |
| 2024 | The Killer | Jong-sae | | |
| 2024 | Regardless of Us | Jeong-seon | supporting role | |
| 2025 | Journeys in Math and Genetics | Min-gyu | Lead role | |
| 2025 | Summer's Camera | Maru | | |

=== Television series ===
Television series appearances
| Year | Title | Role | Note(s) | Ref. |
|---|---|---|---|---|
| 2021 | Kingdom: Ashin of the North | | | |
| 2021 | D.P. | | | |
| 2021 | Taxi Driver | Jeon Jin-won | | |
| 2022 | Monstrous | | | |
| 2022 | Why Her | Soyoung's lawyer | Special appearance | |
| 2022 | Summer Strike | Bae Seong-min | Supporting role | |
| 2023 | Taxi Driver 2 | Assistant Advertising Director | Cameo appearance | |
| 2025 | You and Everything Else | Joo Do-hyang | Supporting role | |
| 2026 | Can This Love Be Translated? | Park In-su | Supporting role | |

== Music video ==
Music video appearances
| Year | Title | Artist(s) | Ref. |
|---|---|---|---|
| 2015 | "Gondry" (공드리) | Oh Hyuk (with Primary feat. Lim Kim) | |

== Accolades ==
=== Awards and nominations ===
Name of the award ceremony, year presented, category, nominee of the award, and the result of the nomination
| Award ceremony | Year | Category | Nominee / Work | Result | Ref. |
|---|---|---|---|---|---|
| 4th Bacchus 29-Second Film Festival | 2016 | General Encouragement Award (Director) | Bacchus Me | Won | |
| 26th Chunsa Film Art Awards | 2021 | Best New Actor | Move the Grave | Nominated | |
| 18th Jeonbuk Independent Film Festival | 2018 | Best Actor | Teardrop | Won | |
| 20th Jeonju International Film Festival | 2019 | Best Actor | The Boy from Nowhere | Won | |
| 40th Korean Association of Film Critics Awards | 2020 | Best New Actor | Move the Grave | Won | |
| 8th Wildflower Film Awards | 2021 | Best Actor Award | The Boy from Nowhere | Won | |
