= The Scandal of Chunhwa =

2025 South Korean television series

- Promotional poster
- Hangul: 춘화연애담
- Hanja: 春畫戀愛談
- Lit.: Chunhwa Love Story
- RR: Chunhwa yeonaedam
- MR: Ch'unhwa yŏnaedam
- Genre: Historical romance
- Written by: Seo Eun-jung
- Directed by: Lee Kwang-young
- Starring: Go Ara; Chang Ryul; Kang Chan-hee
- Music by: Hwang Chan-hee (CP)
- Country of origin: South Korea
- Original language: Korean
- No. of episodes: 10

Production
- Running time: 61–75 minutes
- Production companies: Beyond J; SLL

Original release
- Network: TVING
- Release: February 6 – March 6, 2025

The Scandal of Chunhwa (Korean: 춘화연애담) is a 2025 South Korean historical romance television series starring Go Ara, Chang Ryul, and Kang Chan-hee. The series follows Princess Hwa-ri as she sets out to find true love on her own terms after her first love failed. However, her journey becomes complicated when she gets caught up with two charming suitors, Choi Hwan and Jang Won. It was released on TVING from February 6, to March 6, 2025.

== Synopsis ==
The drama follows Hwa-ri (Go A-ra), a princess determined to choose her own husband, even as her father, the king, rushes to arrange her marriage after rumors spread that she is the protagonist of a provocative anthology titled "Chunhwa Love Stories."

== Cast ==
=== Main ===
- Go Ara as Princess Hwa-ri

- Chang Ryul as Choi Hwan

Hwa-ri's contract marriage partner.

- Kang Chan-hee as Jang Won

The Sungkyunkwan elite.

=== Supporting ===
- Son Woo-hyeon as Crown Prince Lee Seung

Hwa-ri's eldest brother.

- Lim Hwa-young as Crown Princess In-jeong

The Crown Princess, who still has no child.

- Lee Seol as Crown princess

Granddaughter of Prime Minister.

- Bae Yoon-gyu as Kim Min-hong

Hwa-ri's art friend.

- Jin So-yeon as Mrs. Park

She is the owner of a timber store.

- Go Geon-han as Prince Hwaing
- Do Yeon-jin as Princess Hwa-jin

Hwa-ri's life rival.

== Production ==
=== Development ===
The Scandal of Chunhwa is directed by Lee Kwang-young, known for the dramas Call It Love (2023) and No, Thank You (2022), and written by Seo Eun-jung.

Beyond J, which produced the drama Nevertheless (2021), and SLL, which presented Reborn Rich (2022), Doctor Cha (2023), and King the Land (2023), was participating in the co-production.

=== Casting ===
Originally, Go Ah-sung was cast as Princess Hwa-ri. However, on September 8, 2023, she was diagnosed with a fractured sacrum and will need 12 weeks of recovery, and she had to leave the series. On September 12, Go A-ra had been confirmed by her agency to appear in the series as her replacement.

=== Filming ===
In September 2023, Star News reported that the series has started reshooting since September 26.

== Release ==
The Scandal of Chunhwa was scheduled to be released on TVING on February 6, 2025.
