= Rosy Lovers =

2014–2015 South Korean television series

- Promotional poster for Rosy Lovers
- Also known as: Rosy Couple; Love Rosy
- Genre: Romance; Family; Comedy; Melodrama
- Written by: Kim Sa-kyung
- Directed by: Yoon Jae-moon; Jung Ji-in
- Starring: Lee Jang-woo; Han Sun-hwa
- Composer: Jeon Chang-yeop
- Country of origin: South Korea
- Original language: Korean
- No. of episodes: 52

Production
- Executive producers: Kim Dong-gu; Byun Jong-eun
- Producers: Noh Do-chul; Kwak Ji-hoon
- Cinematography: Kim Il-man
- Editor: Kim Gyu-dong
- Running time: 60 minutes
- Production companies: DK E&M; Yedang Entertainment

Original release
- Network: Munhwa Broadcasting Corporation
- Release: October 18, 2014 – April 12, 2015

Rosy Lovers (Korean: 장미빛 연인들; RR: Jangmibit yeonindeul) is a South Korean television series starring Lee Jang-woo and Han Sun-hwa. It aired on MBC from October 18, 2014 to April 12, 2015 on Saturdays and Sundays at 20:40 for 52 episodes.

== Plot ==
Baek Jang-mi is a sophomore majoring in design, a rich girl who grew up without experiencing any hardship in life. Jang-mi's parents want to marry her off to an eligible man they chose for her, but she rebels and begins dating engineering student Park Cha-dol. Lively and outgoing Cha-dol was raised by a single mother, and he's eager to graduate and start earning money to take care of his mom. But when Jang-mi gets pregnant, she and Cha-dol are forced to change their plans, and must begin raising a child while both are still in college. In the process, they slowly gain maturity and learn the true meaning of love.

== Cast ==
- Lee Jang-woo as Park Cha-dol
- Han Sun-hwa as Baek Jang-mi
- Lee Mi-sook as Jung Shi-nae
- Chang Mi-hee as Go Yeon-hwa
- Park Sang-won as Lee Young-gook
- Jeong Bo-seok as Baek Man-jong
- Im Ye-jin as So Geum-ja
- Kim Min-seo as Baek Soo-ryun
- Han Ji-sang as Park Kang-tae
- Yoon A-jung as Park Se-ra
- Choi Phillip as Go Jae-dong
- Kim Young-ok as Jo Bang-shil
- Ban Hyo-jung as Ma Pil-soon
- Lee Go-eun as Park Cho-rong
- Gil Eun-hye as Seo Joo-young

== Awards and nominations ==
Year	Award	Category	Recipient	Result
2014	33rd MBC Drama Awards	Excellence Award, Actor in a Serial Drama	Lee Jang-woo	Won
2014	33rd MBC Drama Awards	Golden Acting Award, Actor	Park Sang-won	Nominated
2014	33rd MBC Drama Awards	Golden Acting Award, Actress	Lee Mi-sook	Won
2014	33rd MBC Drama Awards	Best New Actress	Han Sunhwa	Won
2015	51st Baeksang Arts Awards	Best New Actress – Television	Han Sunhwa	Nominated

== International broadcast ==
- In Singapore, the drama began airing on Mediacorp Channel U from March 8, 2016 with English and Chinese subtitles with options of Chinese dubbed audio or the original Korean audio.
- In Thailand, the drama began airing on True4U from January 13, 2016 on Mondays and Tuesdays at 13:00 to 14:00
