= Love on the Menu =

2026 South Korean television series

- Promotional poster
- Hangul: 사랑이 온다
- Lit.: Love Is Coming
- RR: Sarangi onda
- MR: Sarangi onda
- Genre: Family drama; Romantic comedy
- Written by: Lee Kyung-hee
- Directed by: Hong Seok-gu
- Starring: Hani; Ha Seok-jin
- Country of origin: South Korea
- Original language: Korean
- No. of episodes: 33

Production
- Production companies: Monster Union; Contents G

Original release
- Network: KBS2
- Release: July 25, 2026 – present

Love on the Menu (Korean: 사랑이 온다) is an ongoing South Korean television series written by Lee Kyung-hee, directed by Hong Seok-gu, and starring Hani and Ha Seok-jin. The series follows two couples as they reunite and restart their relationships, as well as a family torn by internal conflicts yet bound by loyalty. It premiered on KBS2 on July 25, 2026, and airs every Saturday and Sunday at 20:00 (KST).

== Synopsis ==
After her affluent family suffers financial collapse, Han Gyu-rim becomes the head of the household and supports them through housework and part-time jobs. She meets Kim Mu-jin and the two develop a relationship over the course of a year. Facing financial hardship, she later ends the relationship, believing it would burden him. Years later, Gyu-rim, who had prioritized her family and was working at a side dish store, reunites with Mu-jin. The two ex-lovers reunite after eight years. Despite family pressure and past conflicts, they rekindle their relationship.

== Cast and characters ==
=== Main ===
- Hani as Han Gyu-rim

Owner of a market side dish shop.

- Ha Seok-jin as Kim Mu-jin

Head chef and owner of an Italian restaurant, and Gyu-rim's lover.

=== Supporting ===
- Park You-na as Han Gyu-young

Gyu-rim's younger sister.

- Bae Jeong-nam as Jo Heung-sik

Gyu-rim's reliable male friend.

- Min Jin-woong as Park Jung-woo

Mu-jin's best friend.

- Lee Joo-yeon as Jang Seo-hyun

A fashion designer, who has harbored feelings for Mu-jin for a long time.

- Jung Bo-min as Kwon Hee-na

An elementary school teacher.

- Kwon Hae-hyo as Jang Hoon-tae

Chairman of a fashion company.

==== Gyu-rim's family ====
- Yoon Yoo-sun as Go Yoon-hee

Gyu-rim's mother.

- Ryu Seung-soo as Han Seok-jung

Gyu-rim's father.

- Bae Yoon-gyu as Han Gyu-oh

Gyu-rim's younger brother.

- Park Soo-oh as Han Gyu-seo

Gyu-rim's youngest brother.

- Kim Min-seo as Han Gyu-min

Gyu-rim's sister.

==== Mu-jin's family ====
- Jin Kyung as Hong Ok-sun

Mu-jin's mother.

==== Other ====
- Jeon Hye-ji as Seo Min-ju

== Production ==
=== Development ===
The series, produced by Monster Union and Contents G, is directed by Hong Seok-gu, who helmed Beauty and Mr. Romantic (2024), and the screenplay is written by Lee Kyung-hee, who wrote I'm Sorry, I Love You (2004) and Uncontrollably Fond (2016).

=== Casting ===
On January 8, 2026, Hani was confirmed by her agency to have been offered a lead role. On January 29, Ha Seok-jin was cast as the male lead. In March 2026, Bae Jeong-nam was reportedly considering the role of the female lead's best friend. The next month, Park You-na joined the lead cast as Gyu-rim's youngest sister. By June 2026, Hani and Ha Seok-jin's appearances were confirmed. The project marks Hani's first weekend drama. The same month, Park You-na, Bae Jeong-nam, Min Jin-woong, Lee Joo-yeon, Bae Yoon-gyu, Jung Bo-min, Kwon Hae-hyo, Yoon Yoo-sun, Ryu Seung-soo, and Jin Kyung were confirmed to appear.

== Release ==
Love on the Menu was originally scheduled to premiere on KBS2 in August 2026, but was moved up to July 2026. The series was confirmed to premiere on KBS2 on July 25, 2026, and will air every Saturday and Sunday at 20:00 (KST).

== Viewership ==
Love on the Menu : South Korea viewers per episode (millions)

Episodes	Episode number																								
Episodes	1	2	3	4	5	6	7	8	9	10	11	12	13	14	15	16	17	18	19	20	21	22	23	24	25
1–25	2.145	2.408	2.247	2.558	2.548	2.848	2.678	2.817	2.844	3.024	2.727	3.159	2.571	3.159	2.847	3.114	2.580	2.744	2.928	2.818	3.113	2.710	3.237	2.921	3.072
26–50	2.753	3.080	2.812	3.162	2.806	3.043	2.943	TBD	TBD	TBD	TBD	TBD	TBD	TBD	TBD	TBD	TBD	TBD	TBD	TBD	TBD	TBD	TBD	TBD	TBD

Source: Audience measurement performed nationwide by Nielsen Korea.

Average TV viewership ratings
Ep.	Original broadcast date	Average audience share (Nielsen Korea)	
Ep.	Original broadcast date	Nationwide	Seoul
1	July 25, 2026	11.7% (2nd)	9.9% (2nd)
2	July 26, 2026	13.0% (1st)	10.8% (1st)
3	August 1, 2026	11.7% (1st)	10.5% (1st)
4	August 2, 2026	13.3% (1st)	12.2% (1st)
5	August 8, 2026	13.4% (1st)	11.8% (1st)
6	August 9, 2026	15.1% (1st)	13.4% (1st)
7	August 15, 2026	14.2% (1st)	12.5% (1st)
8	August 16, 2026	14.8% (1st)	13.2% (1st)
9	August 22, 2026	14.9% (1st)	13.1% (1st)
10	August 23, 2026	16.4% (1st)	14.4% (1st)
11	August 29, 2026	14.8% (1st)	12.7% (1st)
12	August 30, 2026	16.6% (1st)	14.7% (1st)
13	September 5, 2026	14.2% (1st)	12.2% (1st)
14	September 6, 2026	16.6% (1st)	14.5% (1st)
15	September 12, 2026	15.3% (1st)	13.3% (1st)
16	September 13, 2026	16.6% (1st)	14.3% (1st)
17	September 19, 2026	13.8% (1st)	11.9% (1st)
18	September 20, 2026	14.5% (1st)	12.5% (1st)
19	October 4, 2026	15.5% (1st)	13.1% (1st)
20	October 10, 2026	14.7% (2nd)	12.7% (2nd)
21	October 11, 2026	16.3% (1st)	14.2% (1st)
22	October 17, 2026	14.3% (2nd)	12.7% (2nd)
23	October 18, 2026	16.7% (1st)	15.1% (1st)
24	October 24, 2026	15.2% (2nd)	13.7% (2nd)
25	October 25, 2026	16.3% (1st)	14.3% (1st)
26	October 31, 2026	14.7% (2nd)	13.1% (2nd)
27	November 1, 2026	16.1% (1st)	14.5% (1st)
28	November 7, 2026	14.7% (2nd)	13.3% (2nd)
29	November 8, 2026	16.5% (1st)	14.8% (1st)
30	November 14, 2026	15.0% (2nd)	13.4% (2nd)
31	November 15, 2026	15.9% (1st)	14.1% (1st)
32	November 21, 2026	15.3% (1st)	13.6% (1st)
33	November 22, 2026		
34	November 28, 2026		
35	November 29, 2026		
Average		—	—
In the table above, the blue numbers represent the lowest ratings and the red numbers represent the highest ratings.
