= Love Letter to the Dog =

2024 South Korean short film

- Promotional release poster
- Hangul: 개를 위한 러브레터
- RR: Gaereul wihan reobeureteo
- MR: Kaerŭl wihan rŏbŭret'ŏ
- Directed by: Han Seo-yul
- Screenplay by: Han Seo-yul
- Produced by: Seo Ji-soo
- Starring: Han Sun-hwa; Chang Ryul
- Edited by: Han Seo-yul
- Music by: Kim Eun-hye
- Production companies: Seoul Yeongdeungpo International Extreme-Short Image & Film Festival (SESIFF)
- Release date: September 27, 2024
- Running time: 12 minutes 33 seconds
- Country: South Korea
- Language: Korean

Love Letter to the Dog (Korean: 개를 위한 러브레터) is a 2024 South Korean independent psychological thriller drama short film written and directed by Han Seo-yul, and starring Han Sun-hwa and Chang Ryul. The film had its world premiere at the 16th Seoul Yeongdeungpo International Extreme-Short Image & Film Festival (SESIFF) on September 27, 2024. It was produced through the "E-CUT Project," a production support program where actors donate their talents to produce works and the film festival provides funding. In 2024, Han Sun-hwa participated as the talent donor for this film.

== Premise ==
It depicts the story of a woman who regularly meets her ex-boyfriend to see their dog but later finds out that he has a new girlfriend and can't see the dog anymore. Now she wants to get the dog back.

== Cast ==
- Han Sun-hwa as The Woman
- Chang Ryul as The Ex-boyfriend

== Release ==
=== Film festivals ===
The film was selected as one of the opening films at the 16th Seoul Yeongdeungpo International Extreme-Short Image & Film Festival (SESIFF) on September 27, 2024, where it had its world premiere. In 2024, the film was also invited for screening at the 15th Seoul Metro International Subway Film Festival (SMIFF).

In 2025, the film was selected as one of the final screenings at the 22nd Cheongju International Short Film Festival (CISFF), which was held from August 22, 2025, to August 24, 2025. It was also screened at the 5th Geumcheon Fashion Film Festival (GCFFF) and the 5th New Wave Film Festival.

In 2026, the film was selected for screening at the 29th Brussels Short Film Festival (BSFF) in Belgium and the Short Shorts Film Festival & Asia (SSFF & ASIA) in Japan.
