= Carefree Travellers =

South Korean television program

- Also known as: Around The World Travel Package; Guided Adventure; Imagination Expedition
- Genre: Travel; Variety; Reality
- Starring: See below
- Country of origin: South Korea
- Original language: Korean
- No. of seasons: 3
- No. of episodes: Season 1: 91; Season 2: 15; Season 3: 19

Production
- Running time: 90 minutes
- Production company: Genie Pictures

Original release
- Network: JTBC
- Release: November 19, 2016 – July 18, 2023

Carefree Travellers (Korean: 뭉쳐야 뜬다; RR: Mungcheoya tteunda; lit. Unite Together To Be Hot) is a South Korean television program that aired on JTBC.

Season 1 starred Kim Yong-man, Kim Sung-joo, Ahn Jung-hwan and Jung Hyung-don. Season 2 starred Park Joon-hyung (g.o.d), Eun Ji-won (Sechs Kies), Noh Hong-chul, Hwang Je-sung and Sung Hoon.

Season 3, also known as Carefree Travellers Returns (뭉뜬 리턴즈) premiered on March 7, 2023, with the same cast as Season 1, and ended on July 18 the same year.

== Airtime ==
=== Season 1 ===
Air date	Airtime
November 19, 2016 – January 14, 2017	Saturdays at 9:40 PM KST
January 24, 2017 – December 5, 2017	Tuesdays at 10:50 PM KST
December 12, 2017 – May 15, 2018	Tuesdays at 9:30 PM KST
May 27, 2018 – October 7, 2018	Sundays at 9:00 PM KST

=== Season 2 ===
Air date	Airtime
October 27, 2018 – February 9, 2019	Saturdays at 6:00 PM KST

=== Season 3 (Carefree Travellers Returns) ===
Air date	Airtime
March 7, 2023 – present	Tuesdays at 8:50 PM KST

== Cast ==
=== Season 1, 3 ===
- Kim Yong-man
- Kim Sung-joo
- Ahn Jung-hwan
- Jung Hyung-don

=== Season 2 ===
- Park Joon-hyung (g.o.d) (Episode 1-11)
- Sung Hoon (Episode 1-11)
- Ko Eun-sung (Episode 1-4)
- Yoo Seon-ho (Episode 1-4)
- Eun Ji-won (Sechs Kies) (Episode 5-11)
- Noh Hong-chul (Episode 5-15)
- Hwang Je-sung (Episode 5-10)
- Haha (Episode 1-4)

== Program ==
It is a travel program whereby the cast travel around various countries in the form of package tours alongside participating travellers and invited guests, but without the usual managers, talent agents and various staff behind the scenes tagging along.

For Season 2, slightly different from Season 1, the cast, invited guests and participating travellers travel around various countries experiencing local cultures, based on the schedule tailored from the wish lists of the fixed cast and invited guests, and following local package tours.

For Season 3, instead of following package tours, the cast members (or only groups of special guests) go on backpacking trips on their own, with every aspect of the trip to be planned on their own, from accommodation to food to places of interest.

== Episodes ==
=== Season 1 ===
==== 2016 ====
List of episodes (1 – 7)

Episode #	Tour #	Broadcast Date	Destination(s)	Guest(s)	Note(s)
	1	November 19	Thailand (Bangkok, Pattaya)	—N/a	—N/a
2	1	November 26	Thailand (Bangkok, Pattaya)	—N/a	—N/a
3	1	December 3	Thailand (Bangkok, Pattaya)	—N/a	—N/a
4	1	December 10	Thailand (Bangkok, Pattaya)	—N/a	—N/a
5	2	December 17	China (Zhangjiajie)	—N/a	—N/a
6	2	December 24	China (Zhangjiajie)	—N/a	—N/a
7	2	December 31	China (Zhangjiajie)	—N/a	—N/a

==== 2017 ====
List of episodes (8 – 54)

Episode #	Tour #	Broadcast Date	Destination(s)	Guest(s)	Note(s)
8	3	January 7	Japan (Kyushu)	—N/a	—N/a
9	3	January 14	Japan (Kyushu)	—N/a	—N/a
10	4	January 24	Switzerland	Yoon Doo-joon (Highlight)	Jung Hyung-don did not travel for this tour due to his mother being ill at the time of travelling for this tour
11	4	January 31	Switzerland	Yoon Doo-joon (Highlight)	Jung Hyung-don did not travel for this tour due to his mother being ill at the time of travelling for this tour
12	4	February 7	Switzerland	Yoon Doo-joon (Highlight)	Jung Hyung-don did not travel for this tour due to his mother being ill at the time of travelling for this tour
13	4	February 14	Switzerland	Yoon Doo-joon (Highlight)	Jung Hyung-don did not travel for this tour due to his mother being ill at the time of travelling for this tour
14	5	February 21	Vietnam (Hanoi) + Cambodia	—N/a	—N/a
15	5	February 28	Vietnam (Hanoi) + Cambodia	—N/a	—N/a
16	5	March 7	Vietnam (Hanoi) + Cambodia	—N/a	—N/a
17	5	March 14	Vietnam (Hanoi) + Cambodia	—N/a	—N/a
18	6	March 21	Singapore	—N/a	—N/a
19	6	March 28	Singapore	—N/a	—N/a
20	6	April 4	Singapore	—N/a	—N/a
21	7	April 11	Laos	Cha Tae-hyun	No broadcast on April 25 due to the broadcasting of the 19th South Korean Presidential Election debate; No broadcast on May 9 due to the broadcasting of the 19th South Korean Presidential Election Day
22	7	April 18	Laos	Cha Tae-hyun	No broadcast on April 25 due to the broadcasting of the 19th South Korean Presidential Election debate; No broadcast on May 9 due to the broadcasting of the 19th South Korean Presidential Election Day
23	7	May 2	Laos	Cha Tae-hyun	No broadcast on April 25 due to the broadcasting of the 19th South Korean Presidential Election debate; No broadcast on May 9 due to the broadcasting of the 19th South Korean Presidential Election Day
24	7	May 16	Laos	Cha Tae-hyun	No broadcast on April 25 due to the broadcasting of the 19th South Korean Presidential Election debate; No broadcast on May 9 due to the broadcasting of the 19th South Korean Presidential Election Day
25	8	May 23	Australia	Lee Kyung-kyu	—N/a
26	8	May 30	Australia	Lee Kyung-kyu	—N/a
27	8	June 6	Australia	Lee Kyung-kyu	—N/a
28	8	June 13	Australia	Lee Kyung-kyu	—N/a
29	9	June 20	Japan (Hokkaido)	Highlight (Yoon Doo-joon, Yong Jun-hyung)	Special appearance by Minho (Shinee) in episode 32
30	9	June 27	Japan (Hokkaido)	Highlight (Yoon Doo-joon, Yong Jun-hyung)	Special appearance by Minho (Shinee) in episode 32
31	9	July 4	Japan (Hokkaido)	Highlight (Yoon Doo-joon, Yong Jun-hyung)	Special appearance by Minho (Shinee) in episode 32
32	9	July 11	Japan (Hokkaido)	Highlight (Yoon Doo-joon, Yong Jun-hyung)	Special appearance by Minho (Shinee) in episode 32
33	10	July 18	United States (Hawaii)	Jung Jae-hyung	Honeymoon Trip Special
34	10	July 25	United States (Hawaii)	Jung Jae-hyung	Honeymoon Trip Special
35	10	August 1	United States (Hawaii)	Jung Jae-hyung	Honeymoon Trip Special
36	11	August 8	Canada (Toronto)	Seo Jang-hoon	Former Korean folk/pop group Onions member, Lee Soo-young, is one of the participating travellers for this tour
37	11	August 15	Canada (Toronto)	Seo Jang-hoon	Former Korean folk/pop group Onions member, Lee Soo-young, is one of the participating travellers for this tour
38	11	August 22	Canada (Toronto)	Seo Jang-hoon	Former Korean folk/pop group Onions member, Lee Soo-young, is one of the participating travellers for this tour
39	11	August 29	Canada (Toronto)	Seo Jang-hoon	Former Korean folk/pop group Onions member, Lee Soo-young, is one of the participating travellers for this tour
40	12	September 12	Czech Republic (Prague) + Austria (Vienna)	Yoon Jong-shin; Han Chae-ah	No broadcast on September 5 due to the broadcasting of the 2018 FIFA World Cup qualification match; No broadcast on October 3 due to Chuseok
41	12	September 19	Czech Republic (Prague) + Austria (Vienna)	Yoon Jong-shin; Han Chae-ah	No broadcast on September 5 due to the broadcasting of the 2018 FIFA World Cup qualification match; No broadcast on October 3 due to Chuseok
42	12	September 26	Czech Republic (Prague) + Austria (Vienna)	Yoon Jong-shin; Han Chae-ah	No broadcast on September 5 due to the broadcasting of the 2018 FIFA World Cup qualification match; No broadcast on October 3 due to Chuseok
43	12	October 10	Czech Republic (Prague) + Austria (Vienna)	Yoon Jong-shin; Han Chae-ah	No broadcast on September 5 due to the broadcasting of the 2018 FIFA World Cup qualification match; No broadcast on October 3 due to Chuseok
44	13	October 17	Vietnam (Da Nang, Huế)	Twice	Twice member Dahyun did not travel with the group due to an ankle injury
45	13	October 24	Vietnam (Da Nang, Huế)	Twice	Twice member Dahyun did not travel with the group due to an ankle injury
46	13	October 31	Vietnam (Da Nang, Huế)	Twice	Twice member Dahyun did not travel with the group due to an ankle injury
47	14	November 7	Japan (Osaka)	Lee Yeon-bok; Kim Min-jong; Kim Seung-soo; Sunggyu (Infinite)	1st Anniversary Friends Special
48	14	November 14	Japan (Osaka)	Lee Yeon-bok; Kim Min-jong; Kim Seung-soo; Sunggyu (Infinite)	1st Anniversary Friends Special
49	14	November 21	Japan (Osaka)	Lee Yeon-bok; Kim Min-jong; Kim Seung-soo; Sunggyu (Infinite)	1st Anniversary Friends Special
50	15	November 28	Taiwan	Rain	—N/a
51	15	December 5	Taiwan	Rain	—N/a
52	15	December 12	Taiwan	Rain	—N/a
53	16	December 19	South Korea (Suncheon, Tongyeong, Geoje)	Guillaume Patry; Alberto Mondi; Daniel Lindemann; Sam Okyere	Carefree Travellers X Non-Summit Special; First package tour within South Korea
54	16	December 26	South Korea (Suncheon, Tongyeong, Geoje)	Guillaume Patry; Alberto Mondi; Daniel Lindemann; Sam Okyere	Carefree Travellers X Non-Summit Special; First package tour within South Korea

==== 2018 ====
List of episodes (55 – 91)

Episode #	Tour #	Broadcast Date	Destination(s)	Guest(s)	Note(s)
55	17	January 9	Zimbabwe + Zambia + Botswana + South Africa	Choo Sung-hoon	No broadcast on January 2 due to the broadcast of JTBC Newsroom New Year Special
56	17	January 16	Zimbabwe + Zambia + Botswana + South Africa	Choo Sung-hoon	No broadcast on January 2 due to the broadcast of JTBC Newsroom New Year Special
57	17	January 23	Zimbabwe + Zambia + Botswana + South Africa	Choo Sung-hoon	No broadcast on January 2 due to the broadcast of JTBC Newsroom New Year Special
58	17	January 30	Zimbabwe + Zambia + Botswana + South Africa	Choo Sung-hoon	No broadcast on January 2 due to the broadcast of JTBC Newsroom New Year Special
59	17	February 6	Zimbabwe + Zambia + Botswana + South Africa	Choo Sung-hoon	No broadcast on January 2 due to the broadcast of JTBC Newsroom New Year Special
60	18	February 13	Canada (Canadian Rockies)	Bae Jeong-nam	—N/a
61	18	February 20	Canada (Canadian Rockies)	Bae Jeong-nam	—N/a
62	18	February 27	Canada (Canadian Rockies)	Bae Jeong-nam	—N/a
63	18	March 6	Canada (Canadian Rockies)	Bae Jeong-nam	—N/a
64	19	March 13	United Arab Emirates (Dubai)	Eun Ji-won (Sechs Kies)	—N/a
65	19	March 20	United Arab Emirates (Dubai)	Eun Ji-won (Sechs Kies)	—N/a
66	19	March 27	United Arab Emirates (Dubai)	Eun Ji-won (Sechs Kies)	—N/a
67	19	April 3	United Arab Emirates (Dubai)	Eun Ji-won (Sechs Kies)	—N/a
68	20	April 10	United States (Grand Canyon, Las Vegas)	Jang Hyuk	—N/a
69	20	April 17	United States (Grand Canyon, Las Vegas)	Jang Hyuk	—N/a
70	20	April 24	United States (Grand Canyon, Las Vegas)	Jang Hyuk	—N/a
71	20	May 1	United States (Grand Canyon, Las Vegas)	Jang Hyuk	—N/a
72	21	May 8	South Korea (Gyeongju, Ulsan, Busan)	Guillaume Patry; Alberto Mondi; Daniel Lindemann; Sam Okyere (with the mothers of the 4 guests)	Carefree Travellers X Non-Summit Filial Piety Package Tour Special; Kim Sung-joo is absent from Day 2 onward due to the passing of his father-in-law
73	21	May 15	South Korea (Gyeongju, Ulsan, Busan)	Guillaume Patry; Alberto Mondi; Daniel Lindemann; Sam Okyere (with the mothers of the 4 guests)	Carefree Travellers X Non-Summit Filial Piety Package Tour Special; Kim Sung-joo is absent from Day 2 onward due to the passing of his father-in-law
74	21	May 27	South Korea (Gyeongju, Ulsan, Busan)	Guillaume Patry; Alberto Mondi; Daniel Lindemann; Sam Okyere (with the mothers of the 4 guests)	Carefree Travellers X Non-Summit Filial Piety Package Tour Special; Kim Sung-joo is absent from Day 2 onward due to the passing of his father-in-law
75	22	June 3	France (Paris) + Switzerland (Swiss Alps)	Seolhyun (AOA)	No broadcast on June 10 due to the broadcasting of JTBC Newsroom's coverage of the 2018 North Korea–United States summit
76	22	June 17	France (Paris) + Switzerland (Swiss Alps)	Seolhyun (AOA)	No broadcast on June 10 due to the broadcasting of JTBC Newsroom's coverage of the 2018 North Korea–United States summit
77	22	June 24	France (Paris) + Switzerland (Swiss Alps)	Seolhyun (AOA)	No broadcast on June 10 due to the broadcasting of JTBC Newsroom's coverage of the 2018 North Korea–United States summit
78	23	July 1	China (Taihang Mountains, Wanxian Mountain)	Jo Se-ho	—N/a
79	23	July 8	China (Taihang Mountains, Wanxian Mountain)	Jo Se-ho	—N/a
80	23	July 15	China (Taihang Mountains, Wanxian Mountain)	Jo Se-ho	—N/a
81	23	July 22	China (Taihang Mountains, Wanxian Mountain)	Jo Se-ho	—N/a
82	24	July 29	Japan (Tsushima Island)	Rhyu Si-min; Lee Ha-neul (DJ Doc); Yoo Byung-jae	Ahn Jung-hwan did not travel for this tour due to schedules relating to the 2018 FIFA World Cup at the time of travelling for this tour
83	24	August 5	Japan (Tsushima Island)	Rhyu Si-min; Lee Ha-neul (DJ Doc); Yoo Byung-jae	Ahn Jung-hwan did not travel for this tour due to schedules relating to the 2018 FIFA World Cup at the time of travelling for this tour
84	24	August 12	Japan (Tsushima Island)	Rhyu Si-min; Lee Ha-neul (DJ Doc); Yoo Byung-jae	Ahn Jung-hwan did not travel for this tour due to schedules relating to the 2018 FIFA World Cup at the time of travelling for this tour
85	25	August 19	Japan (Hokkaido)	Yang Hee-eun; Seo Min-jung; Hong Jin-young; Lee Sang-hwa	Summer Special; None of the cast members are involved in this tour
86	25	August 26	Japan (Hokkaido)	Yang Hee-eun; Seo Min-jung; Hong Jin-young; Lee Sang-hwa	Summer Special; None of the cast members are involved in this tour
87	25	September 2	Japan (Hokkaido)	Yang Hee-eun; Seo Min-jung; Hong Jin-young; Lee Sang-hwa	Summer Special; None of the cast members are involved in this tour
88	26	September 9	United Kingdom (London, Stonehenge, Seven Sisters, Brighton)	Jin Seon-kyu (with 4 of his friends from Jinhae)	Final tour for Season 1; No broadcast on September 23 due to Chuseok
89	26	September 16	United Kingdom (London, Stonehenge, Seven Sisters, Brighton)	Jin Seon-kyu (with 4 of his friends from Jinhae)	Final tour for Season 1; No broadcast on September 23 due to Chuseok
90	26	September 30	United Kingdom (London, Stonehenge, Seven Sisters, Brighton)	Jin Seon-kyu (with 4 of his friends from Jinhae)	Final tour for Season 1; No broadcast on September 23 due to Chuseok
91	26	October 7	United Kingdom (London, Stonehenge, Seven Sisters, Brighton)	Jin Seon-kyu (with 4 of his friends from Jinhae)	Final tour for Season 1; No broadcast on September 23 due to Chuseok

=== Season 2 ===
==== 2018 ====
List of episodes (1 – 10)

Episode #	Tour #	Broadcast Date	Destination(s)	Guest(s)	Note(s)
1	1	October 27	Italy (Rome, Tuscany)	Haha; Kwak Yoon-gy	First tour of Season 2; Eun Ji-won did not travel for this tour due to the passing of his father at the time of travelling for this tour
2	1	November 3	Italy (Rome, Tuscany)	Haha; Kwak Yoon-gy	First tour of Season 2; Eun Ji-won did not travel for this tour due to the passing of his father at the time of travelling for this tour
3	1	November 10	Italy (Rome, Tuscany)	Haha; Kwak Yoon-gy	First tour of Season 2; Eun Ji-won did not travel for this tour due to the passing of his father at the time of travelling for this tour
4	1	November 17	Italy (Rome, Tuscany)	Haha; Kwak Yoon-gy	First tour of Season 2; Eun Ji-won did not travel for this tour due to the passing of his father at the time of travelling for this tour
5	2	November 24	Mexico (Mexico City, Teotihuacan, Cancún)	Cha Eun-woo (Astro)	—
6	2	December 1	Mexico (Mexico City, Teotihuacan, Cancún)	Cha Eun-woo (Astro)	—
7	2	December 8	Mexico (Mexico City, Teotihuacan, Cancún)	Cha Eun-woo (Astro)	—
8	2	December 15	Mexico (Mexico City, Teotihuacan, Cancún)	Cha Eun-woo (Astro)	—
9	3	December 22	Thailand (Bangkok, Ratchaburi Province, Chiang Mai)	Mino (Winner)	Hwang Je-sung returned to Korea early due to other schedules
10	3	December 29	Thailand (Bangkok, Ratchaburi Province, Chiang Mai)	Mino (Winner)	Hwang Je-sung returned to Korea early due to other schedules

==== 2019 ====
List of episodes (11 – 15)

Episode #	Tour #	Broadcast Date	Destination(s)	Guest(s)	Note(s)
11	3	January 12	Thailand (Bangkok, Chiang Mai)	Mino (Winner)	No broadcast on January 5 due to the live broadcast of the 33rd Golden Disc Awards; Hwang Je-sung was absent due to other schedules
12	4	January 19	Morocco (Marrakesh, Essaouira, Aït Benhaddou, Sahara)	Go Doo-shim; Oh Yeon-soo; Lee Hye-young; Im Soo-hyang	Final tour for Season 2; None of the cast members are involved in this tour except Noh Hong-chul
13	4	January 26	Morocco (Marrakesh, Essaouira, Aït Benhaddou, Sahara)	Go Doo-shim; Oh Yeon-soo; Lee Hye-young; Im Soo-hyang	Final tour for Season 2; None of the cast members are involved in this tour except Noh Hong-chul
14	4	February 2	Morocco (Marrakesh, Essaouira, Aït Benhaddou, Sahara)	Go Doo-shim; Oh Yeon-soo; Lee Hye-young; Im Soo-hyang	Final tour for Season 2; None of the cast members are involved in this tour except Noh Hong-chul
15	4	February 9	Morocco (Marrakesh, Essaouira, Aït Benhaddou, Sahara)	Go Doo-shim; Oh Yeon-soo; Lee Hye-young; Im Soo-hyang	Final tour for Season 2; None of the cast members are involved in this tour except Noh Hong-chul

=== Season 3 ===
==== 2023 ====
List of episodes (1 – 19)

Episode #	Tour #	Broadcast Date	Destination(s)	Guest(s)	Note(s)
1	1	March 7	Spain (Barcelona)	—N/a	First tour of Season 3; No episode on March 28 due to internal issues, and a special broadcast was aired instead
2	1	March 14	Spain (Barcelona)	—N/a	First tour of Season 3; No episode on March 28 due to internal issues, and a special broadcast was aired instead
3	1	March 21	Spain (Barcelona)	—N/a	First tour of Season 3; No episode on March 28 due to internal issues, and a special broadcast was aired instead
4	1	April 4	Spain (Barcelona)	—N/a	First tour of Season 3; No episode on March 28 due to internal issues, and a special broadcast was aired instead
5	1	April 11	Spain (Barcelona)	—N/a	First tour of Season 3; No episode on March 28 due to internal issues, and a special broadcast was aired instead
6	2	April 18	Vietnam (Hanoi)	Noh Sa-yeon; Lee Kyung-kyu; Park Mi-sun; Jo Hye-ryun; Shin Bong-sun	None of the cast members were featured in this trip
7	2	April 25	Vietnam (Hanoi)	Noh Sa-yeon; Lee Kyung-kyu; Park Mi-sun; Jo Hye-ryun; Shin Bong-sun	None of the cast members were featured in this trip
8	2	May 2	Vietnam (Hanoi)	Noh Sa-yeon; Lee Kyung-kyu; Park Mi-sun; Jo Hye-ryun; Shin Bong-sun	None of the cast members were featured in this trip
9	3	May 9	Italy (Rome)	Pak Se-ri; Kim Min-kyung; Kim Dong-hyun; Yun Sung-bin	None of the cast members were featured in this trip
10	3	May 16	Italy (Rome)	Pak Se-ri; Kim Min-kyung; Kim Dong-hyun; Yun Sung-bin	None of the cast members were featured in this trip
11	3	May 23	Italy (Rome)	Pak Se-ri; Kim Min-kyung; Kim Dong-hyun; Yun Sung-bin	None of the cast members were featured in this trip
12	3	May 30	Italy (Rome)	Pak Se-ri; Kim Min-kyung; Kim Dong-hyun; Yun Sung-bin	None of the cast members were featured in this trip
13	4	June 6	France (Paris)	Kim Dong-hyun	Kim Dong-hyun only appeared from episode 14; Jung Hyung-don returned to Korea early due to illness
14	4	June 13	France (Paris)	Kim Dong-hyun	Kim Dong-hyun only appeared from episode 14; Jung Hyung-don returned to Korea early due to illness
15	4	June 20	France (Paris)	Kim Dong-hyun	Kim Dong-hyun only appeared from episode 14; Jung Hyung-don returned to Korea early due to illness
16	4	June 27	France (Paris)	Kim Dong-hyun	Kim Dong-hyun only appeared from episode 14; Jung Hyung-don returned to Korea early due to illness
17	5	July 4	Thailand (Chiang Mai)	Koyote	Final tour of Season 3; None of the cast members were featured in this trip
18	5	July 11	Thailand (Chiang Mai)	Koyote	Final tour of Season 3; None of the cast members were featured in this trip
19	5	July 18	Thailand (Chiang Mai)	Koyote	Final tour of Season 3; None of the cast members were featured in this trip

== Ratings ==
In the ratings below, the highest rating for the show will be in red, and the lowest rating for the show will be in blue each year.

=== Season 1 ===
==== 2016 ====
List of ratings (episode 1 – 7)

Ep. #	Broadcast date	Average audience share		
Ep. #	Broadcast date	AGB Nielsen		TNmS Ratings
Ep. #	Broadcast date	Nationwide	Seoul Capital Area	Nationwide
1	November 19	2.933%	2.968%	2.7%
2	November 6	2.988%	NR	3.3%
3	December 3	2.508%	NR	2.7%
4	December 10	2.895%	2.964%	2.1%
5	December 17	3.592%	4.019%	3.4%
6	December 24	2.898%	3.066%	2.7%
7	December 31	4.512%	4.159%	3.7%

==== 2017 ====
List of ratings (episode 8 – 54)

Ep. #	Broadcast date	Average audience share		
Ep. #	Broadcast date	AGB Nielsen		TNmS Ratings
Ep. #	Broadcast date	Nationwide	Seoul Capital Area	Nationwide
8	January 7	3.547%	3.811%	3.2%
9	January 14	3.535%	3.929%	3.6%
10	January 24	3.953%	4.184%	4.0%
11	January 31	4.558%	5.629%	3.5%
12	February 7	4.206%	5.007%	4.2%
13	February 14	3.879%	3.952%	3.6%
14	February 21	5.522%	5.893%	4.5%
15	February 28	5.221%	5.569%	5.3%
16	March 7	4.659%	4.782%	2.9%
17	March 14	3.864%	4.219%	3.6%
18	March 21	4.533%	4.292%	4.5%
19	March 28	3.513%	3.560%	4.2%
20	April 4	4.486%	4.787%	4.6%
21	April 11	5.206%	5.104%	5.8%
22	April 18	5.127%	5.569%	4.7%
23	May 2	4.217%	4.188%	4.6%
24	May 16	4.392%	4.292%	4.5%
25	May 23	4.788%	5.531%	4.5%
26	May 30	4.536%	4.530%	4.8%
27	June 6	3.897%	4.106%	3.8%
28	June 13	3.713%	3.900%	4.3%
29	June 20	5.317%	5.683%	5.0%
30	June 27	4.254%	4.231%	4.7%
31	July 4	3.839%	4.130%	4.7%
32	July 11	4.683%	4.983%	4.2%
33	July 18	4.843%	5.351%	4.8%
34	July 25	3.995%	4.643%	4.4%
35	August 1	3.764%	4.416%	4.3%
36	August 8	5.201%	5.579%	5.0%
37	August 15	5.101%	5.449%	4.8%
38	August 22	4.950%	5.329%	4.8%
39	August 29	5.123%	5.985%	4.4%
40	September 12	4.527%	5.106%	4.1%
41	September 19	3.843%	3.950%	3.8%
42	September 26	3.597%	3.994%	3.9%
43	October 10	3.396%	3.748%	3.1%
44	October 17	3.900%	4.207%	3.7%
45	October 24	3.105%	3.617%	3.3%
46	October 31	3.015%	3.227%	3.0%
47	November 7	4.094%	4.649%	3.4%
48	November 14	2.627%	2.551%	2.9%
49	November 21	3.096%	2.983%	3.1%
50	November 28	5.617%	6.313%	5.4%
51	December 5	4.148%	4.564%	3.5%
52	December 12	4.966%	5.534%	4.7%
53	December 19	5.702%	6.221%	4.8%
54	December 26	5.200%	5.487%	4.9%

==== 2018 ====
List of ratings (episode 55 – 91)

Ep. #	Broadcast date	Average audience share		
Ep. #	Broadcast date	AGB Nielsen		TNmS Ratings
Ep. #	Broadcast date	Nationwide	Seoul Capital Area	Nationwide
55	January 9	6.122%	6.183%	4.8%
56	January 16	5.116%	5.187%	4.6%
57	January 23	5.393%	5.597%	4.8%
58	January 30	4.940%	5.531%	4.8%
59	February 6	4.516%	4.625%	3.9%
60	February 13	4.742%	5.353%	4.2%
61	February 20	4.069%	4.643%	3.7%
62	February 27	3.448%	3.177%	4.5%
63	March 6	4.317%	5.080%	4.4%
64	March 13	5.007%	5.685%	4.9%
65	March 20	4.681%	5.234%	4.8%
66	March 27	3.885%	4.245%	4.0%
67	April 3	3.712%	4.095%	3.4%
68	April 10	3.888%	4.169%	4.7%
69	April 17	3.594%	3.540%	3.5%
70	April 24	3.607%	3.688%	4.3%
71	May 1	4.118%	4.591%	3.9%
72	May 8	4.697%	5.186%	4.8%
73	May 15	4.051%	4.636%	3.7%
74	May 27	3.011%	3.539%	4.1%
75	June 3	2.928%	3.293%	NR
76	June 17	2.449%	2.707%	NR
77	June 24	2.355%	2.706%	NR
78	July 1	3.305%	3.770%	NR
79	July 8	3.604%	3.865%	NR
80	July 15	2.704%	3.066%	NR
81	July 22	2.315%	2.672%	NR
82	July 29	2.538%	2.741%	NR
83	August 5	2.065%	2.154%	NR
84	August 12	1.663%	NR	NR
85	August 19	5.830%	6.327%	NR
86	August 26	3.543%	3.567%	NR
87	September 2	2.395%	2.325%	NR
88	September 9	1.812%	1.815%	NR
89	September 16	1.683%	NR	NR
90	September 30	1.308%	NR	NR
91	October 7	1.841%	NR	NR

=== Season 2 ===
==== 2018 ====
List of ratings (episode 1 – 10)

Ep. #	Broadcast date	Average audience share	
Ep. #	Broadcast date	AGB Nielsen	
Ep. #	Broadcast date	Nationwide	Seoul Capital Area
1	October 27	2.170%	2.711%
2	November 3	1.520%	NR
3	November 10	1.695%	NR
4	November 17	1.966%	2.344%
5	November 24	2.075%	NR
6	December 1	1.446%	NR
7	December 8	1.657%	NR
8	December 15	1.512%	NR
9	December 22	1.999%	NR
10	December 29	2.178%	2.529%

==== 2019 ====
List of ratings (episode 11 – 15)

Ep. #	Broadcast date	Average audience share	
Ep. #	Broadcast date	AGB Nielsen	
Ep. #	Broadcast date	Nationwide	Seoul Capital Area
11	January 12	1.572%	—N/a
12	January 19	2.608%	2.895%
13	January 26	2.548%	2.974%
14	February 2	1.412%	—N/a
15	February 9	1.387%	—N/a

=== Season 3 ===
==== 2023 ====
List of ratings (episode 1 – 19)

Ep. #	Broadcast date	Average audience share	
Ep. #	Broadcast date	AGB Nielsen	
Ep. #	Broadcast date	Nationwide	Seoul Capital Area
1	March 7	2.939%	3.350%
2	March 14	2.747%	2.829%
3	March 21	3.071%	3.107%
4	April 4	2.300%	NR
5	April 11	2.436%	2.617%
6	April 18	2.646%	2.564%
7	April 25	2.644%	2.393%
8	May 2	1.988%	NR
9	May 9	2.389%	2.051%
10	May 16	2.506%	2.731%
11	May 23	2.265%	2.315%
12	May 30	2.270%	NR
13	June 6	2.563%	2.654%
14	June 13	1.836%	NR
15	June 20	1.594%	NR
16	June 27	1.718%	NR
17	July 4	2.358%	NR
18	July 11	2.732%	2.426%
19	July 18	2.180%	NR

- NR rating means "not reported".
- TNmS have stopped publishing their rating report from June 2018.
