= Bae Yoon-gyu =

South Korean actor (born 1999)

- Born: May 17, 1999 (age 27); South Korea
- Occupation: Actor
- Years active: 2022–present
- Agent: L'July Entertainment
- Website: ljulyent.com

Bae Yoon-gyu (Korean: 배윤규; born May 17, 1999) is a South Korean actor. He made his debuted in KBS Drama Special—Season 13: Prism (2022) He is known for the role Kim Min-Hong in The Scandal of Chunhwa (2025)

== Filmography ==
=== Film ===
Year	Title	Role	Notes	Ref.
2025	Revelations	So Eun-gyu	Netflix film	

=== Television series ===
Year	Title	Role	Notes	Ref.
2022	KBS Drama Special— Season 13: Prism	Yun U-sang	One-act drama	
2022	Unlock My Boss	Intern (Episode 1)		
2025	The Witch	Kim Jung-hwan		
2025	My Youth	Min-kyu (Episode 9)		
2025	Shin's Project	Mr. Bae		
2026	Climax	Nam Woo-sik		
2026	Love on the Menu	Han Gyu-oh		

=== Web series ===
Year	Title	Role	Notes	Ref.
2025	The Scandal of Chunhwa	Kim Min-Hong		
2025	Karma	teen Park Jae-yeong		
