= Chang Ryul =

South Korean actor (born 1989)

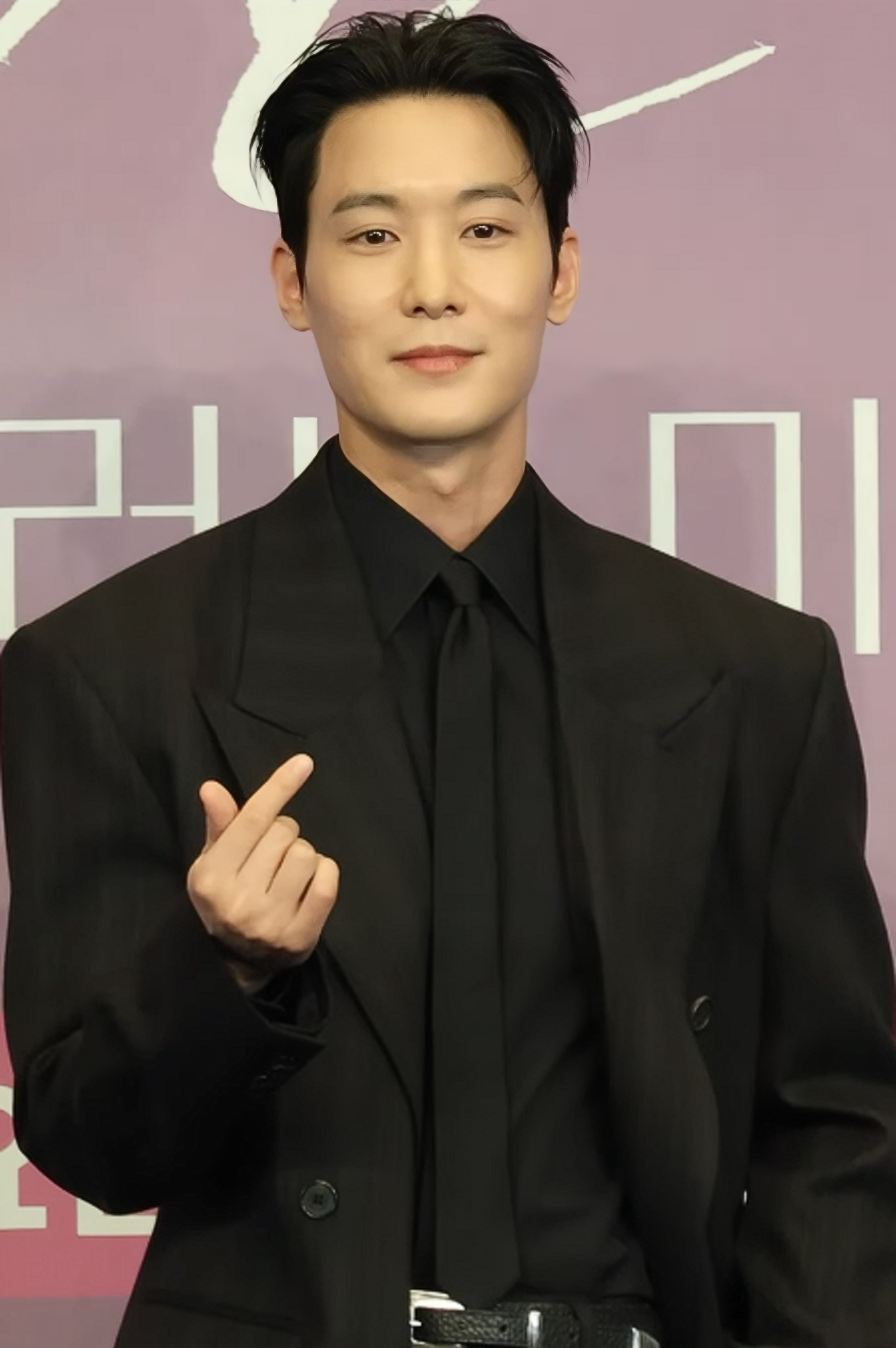
- Chang in 2025
- Born: Chang Ryul; February 14, 1989 (age 37); Seoul, South Korea
- Other name: Jang Ryool
- Education: Korea National University of Arts (Department of Theater-Bachelor of Arts in Acting)
- Occupation: Actor
- Years active: 2003–present
- Agent: Management MMM

Chang Ryul (Korean: 장률; born February 14, 1989) is a South Korean actor. He is known for his roles in dramas such as Daily Dose of Sunshine, My Name, Stranger Season 2, The Golden Spoon and The Scandal of Chunhwa. He also appeared in films including Master, Detective K: Secret of the Living Dead, and Jo Pil-ho: The Dawning Rage.

== Filmography ==
=== Film ===
Key
†	Denotes films that have not yet been released

Year	Title	Role	Notes	Ref.
2016	Master	One Network employee		
2017	Coffee Noir: Black Brown	Chang-beom		
2018	Detective K: Secret of the Living Dead	Choi Jae-kyung		
2019	Jo Pil-ho: The Dawning Rage	Violent crimes investigation team member		
2024	Love Letter to the Dog	The Ex-boyfriend	Short film	
2026	The Table: Day and Night	Young-min	Opening film of BIFF	

=== Television series ===
Key
†	Denotes television productions that have not yet been released

Year	Title	Role	Notes	Ref.
2018	My Mister	Assistant Director		
2018	Lawless Lawyer	Detective		
2018	Something in the Rain	Customer		
2019	Welcome to Waikiki	Jang-yul	Season 2	
2019	Arthdal Chronicles	Asa Yon	Part 1–3	
2019	Secret Boutique	Lee Joo-ho		
2019	KBS Drama Special: Wreck Car	Kim Do-hoon		
2020	Train	Park Tae-kyung		
2020	Stranger Season 2	Yoo Jeong-o		
2021	My Name	Do Gang-jae		
2023	Daily Dose of Sunshine	Hwang Yeo-hwan		
2024	The Golden Spoon	Seo Jun-tae		
2024	Bargain	Go Geuk-ryul		
2025	The Scandal of Chunhwa	Choi Hwan		
2025	Love Me	Ju Do-hyeon		
2025	Bargain Season 2	Go Geuk-ryul		
2026	Final Table	Cha Woo-jin		

== Awards and nominations ==
Name of the award ceremony, year presented, category, nominee of the award, and the result of the nomination
Award ceremony	Year	Category	Nominee / Work	Result	Ref.
Blue Dragon Series Awards	2022	Best Actor	My Name	Nominated	
