= When Winter Comes (2021 film) =

2021 South Korean romantic drama film

- Theatrical poster
- Hangul: 창밖은 겨울
- RR: Changbakkeun gyeoul
- MR: Ch'angbakkŭn kyŏul
- Directed by: Lee Sang-jin
- Screenplay by: Lee Sang-jin
- Produced by: Lee Sang-jin
- Starring: Kwak Min-gyu; Han Sun-hwa
- Production companies: KiriKiri Film; Jinjin Film Company
- Distributed by: M-Line Distribution; Jinjin Film Company
- Release dates: May 2, 2021 (JIFF); November 24, 2022 (South Korea)
- Running time: 104 minutes
- Country: South Korea
- Language: Korean
- Box office: US$37,969

When Winter Comes (Korean: 창밖은 겨울) is a 2021 South Korean independent romantic drama film written and directed by Lee Sang-jin, and starring Kwak Min-gyu and Han Sun-hwa. The film had its world premiere at the 22nd Jeonju International Film Festival (JIFF) on May 2, 2021. It had its theatrical release on November 24, 2022.

== Plot ==
Once a film director, Seok-woo (Kwak Min-gyu), who is now working as a bus driver in his hometown, lives a rather boring and monotonous daily life until one day he sees a woman who looks like his ex-girlfriend, Su-yeon, at the terminal. Then he finds a broken MP3 player left on her seat, and soon he starts to go around all the repair shops around the city. Young-ae (Han Sun-hwa), his coworker, getting curious about his sudden changes, shortly joins his journey to fix this small and old MP3 player.

== Cast ==
- Kwak Min-gyu as Gong Seok-woo, a bus driver
- Han Sun-hwa as Yang Young-ae, a ticket sales and lost-and-found clerk
- Mok Gyu-ri as Su-yeon, Gong Seok-woo's ex-girlfriend
- Ahn Sang-jin
- Ahn Min-young
- Son Seong-chan
- Lee Jung-bi
- Yang Ji-woong
- Choi Hee-jin

== Release ==
=== Film festivals ===
On May 2, 2021, the film had its world premiere at the 22nd Jeonju International Film Festival: JIFF in the Korean Cinema section.

In 2021, the film was also invited for screening at the Jeonbuk Independent Film Festival in the Feature Film Competition section.

=== Theatrical release ===
It was released theatrically on November 24, 2022, in South Korea.

== Box Office ==
The film was released on 55 screens on November 24, 2022.

According to the Korean Box Office Information System (KOBIS), as of August 13, 2025, the film's total gross is US$37,969 from 7,267 admissions.
