= Han Sun-hwa =

South Korean singer and actress (born 1990)

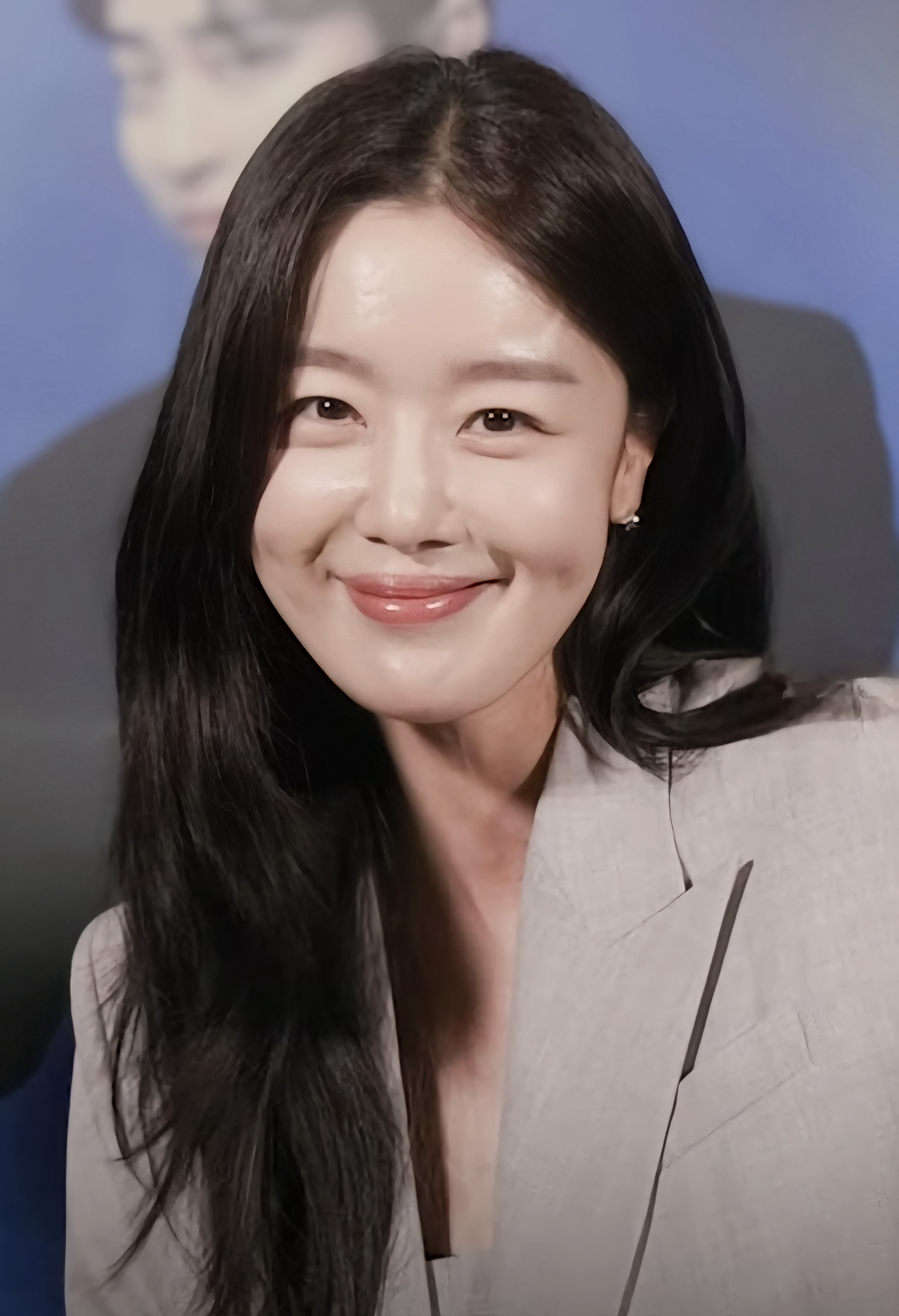
- Han in August 2024
- Born: October 6, 1990 (age 36); Busan, South Korea
- Occupations: Actress; singer
- Years active: 2009–present
- Agent: Ghost Studio
- Relatives: Han Seung-woo (brother)
- Musical career
- Genre: K-pop
- Instrument: Vocals
- Years active: 2009–2016
- Label: TS Entertainment
- Formerly of: Secret

Korean name
- Hangul: 한선화
- Hanja: 韓善伙
- RR: Han Seonhwa
- MR: Han Sŏnhwa
- Website: ghoststudio.net

Signature
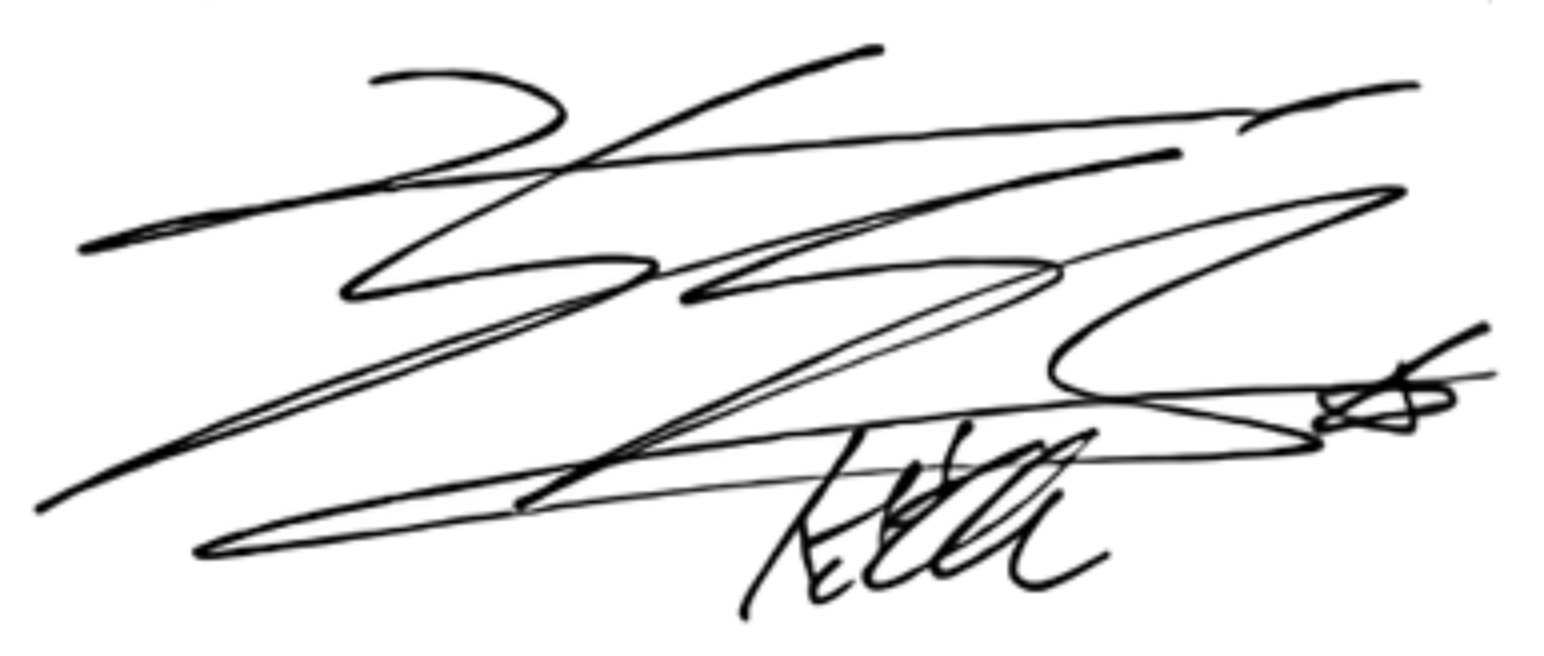

Han Sun-hwa (Korean: 한선화; born October 6, 1990), also known mononymously as Sunhwa, is a South Korean actress and singer. She is a former member of the South Korean girl group Secret. She made her television debut in 2004 while participating in SBS' Superstar Survival as a finalist, and in 2009, she was a regular cast member on a variety show called Invincible Youth. Aside from music, she also ventured into acting. Some of her notable works include Marriage, Not Dating (2014), Work Later, Drink Now (2021–2023), A Letter from Kyoto (2022), My Sweet Mobster (2024), Teaching Practice: Idiot Girls and School Ghost 2 (2025), and We Are All Trying Here (2026).

== Early life ==
=== Family ===
Han Sun-hwa was born on October 6, 1990, in Buk District, Busan, South Korea. She has one younger sister and one younger brother, Han Seung-woo. Han's mother gave birth to her at the young age of 20. As the eldest child, she took care of her younger siblings by cooking them food and tutoring them when both of their parents had to work. During the East Asian Financial Crisis in 1998, Han's family struggled and recalled that her dream of being an entertainer was getting dim.

=== Creative interests and primary education ===
Ever since she was young, Han had an interest in art and had always dreamed of becoming an artist. She took after-school art programs in elementary school and managed to win several awards from various art competitions. However, after seeing one of BoA's performances on television, she realized her dream was singing and dancing.

== Career ==
=== 2004–2008: Career beginnings, higher education and challenges ===
Since then, Han began auditioning for various recording companies; she entered the S.M. Entertainment Youth Trainee Program but was eliminated. In 2004, Han started auditioning at companies besides singing competitions. In 2005, she became a finalist on a talent show called Superstar Survival along with 2PM's Taecyeon, Lee Junho and Chansung. During the show, Han received vocal and acting training; however, she was eliminated in the fifth episode and went back to Busan.

Following her setback, Han went back to being an ordinary high school student. She was later admitted to the Department of Musical Theatre at the Paekche Institute of the Arts. A few days before the college entrance ceremony, an agent who had seen her in Superstar Survival contacted her, and she later became a trainee at TS Entertainment. As a trainee, she struggled to balance her education with her demanding training schedule, eventually taking an extended leave of absence from the university.

=== 2009–2013: Secret, Invincible Youth, acting debut and rising popularity ===
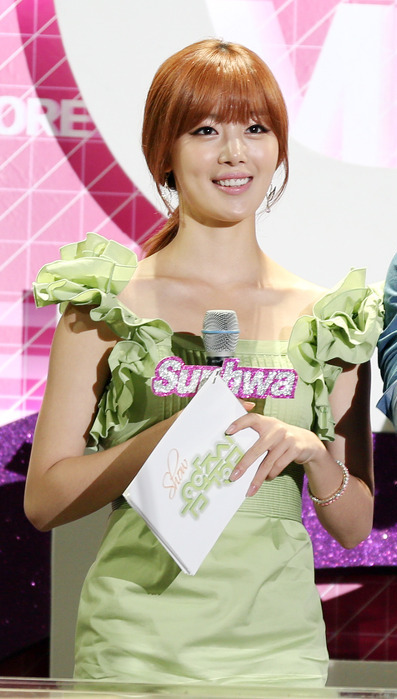
Han hosting Music Core in September 2012

In October 2009, Han, along with Jung Ha-na, Song Ji-eun and Jun Hyo-seong, debuted in the group Secret; prior to their debut, the group was on a documentary show called Secret Story which chronicled their debut process. In the same month, Han was chosen as a regular cast member of a South Korean variety show called Invincible Youth; the news that a girl group member who hadn't debuted yet would be selected for a variety program caused a huge sensation.

Secret released their debut single "I Want You Back" in October 2009. In April 2010, they released their first mini album entitled Secret Time which spawned the hit single "Magic" and served as their breakthrough song in South Korea. The same year, Han made a cameo appearance in the sitcom More Charming by the Day. On December 28, 2010, she made another cameo appearance in MBC's daily sitcom, All My Love for You playing Gain's old college friend. Later, she appeared in a supporting role in the workplace drama Ad Genius Lee Tae-baek, which she described as her "first acting challenge".

While portraying the variety-show role/image crafted by TS Entertainment to promote the agency and Secret, Han also gained recognition for her activities in modeling and acting. In 2011, she was listed by CNN International Seoul as one of the nine rising 'It' stars in Korean entertainment, highlighting her versatility across modeling and acting. In 2012, for the year end SBS Gayo Daejeon show, SBS created four idol super groups, a fan vote placed Han into the group designated Mystic White, the group working with producer Kim Do-hoon, created the song "Mermaid Princess" the profits of which was donated to charity.

=== 2014–2020: Acting roles and group departure ===
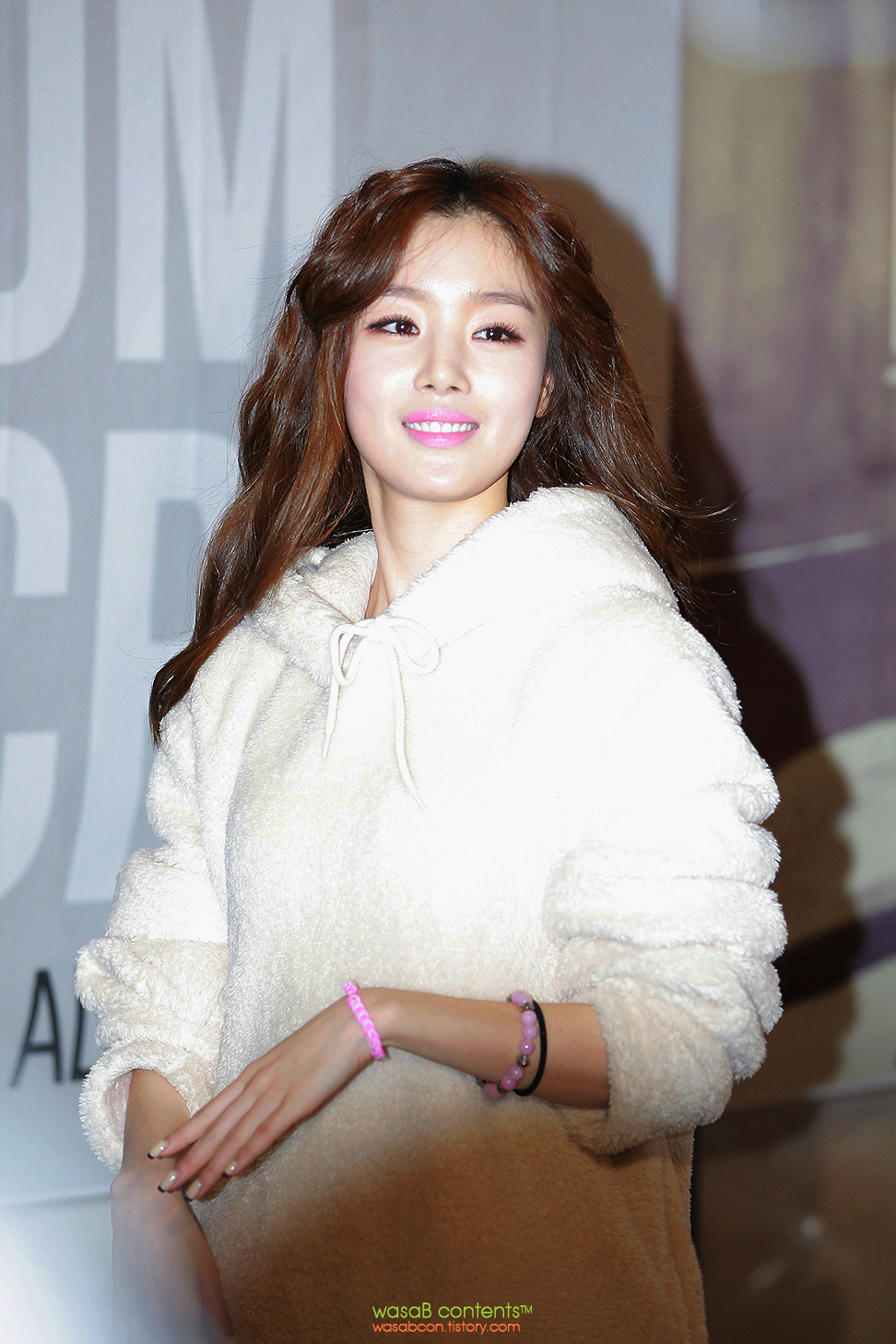
Han at the Yeouido IFC Mall celebrity signing in 2014

In 2014, Han got her first television lead role in the MBC weekend drama Rosy Lovers alongside actor Lee Jang-woo. The same year, her performance in tvN romance drama, Marriage, Not Dating earned her a nomination for Best Young Actress at the 16th Seoul International Youth Film Festival. She also won two best new actress awards from MBC and SBS Drama Awards for her roles in Rosy Lovers and fantasy thriller God's Gift: 14 Days.

It was confirmed on September 26, 2016, that Han had not renewed her contract with TS Entertainment and would leave the company in October. On October 17, 2016, Huayi Brothers announced through an official statement that it had signed an exclusive contract with Han.

In 2017, Han starred in the office comedy series Radiant Office, as well as teen drama School 2017. In 2018, Sunhwa was cast in MBC weekend drama My Contracted Husband, Mr. Oh.

On March 13, 2020, KeyEast announced that it had signed an exclusive contract with Han. Later, she joined the main cast of the romantic-comedy drama, Backstreet Rookie, adapted from the webtoon of the same name. She played the male lead's girlfriend and former boss, and the Public Relations team leader at the convenience store headquarters. In July 2020, she confirmed her appearance in the JTBC drama Undercover, the Korean remake of 2016 BBC miniseries of the same name, as young Choi Yeon-soo, who later becomes the wife of the younger version of the male lead (played by actor Yeon Woo-jin).

=== 2021–present: Acting breakthrough and subsequent roles ===
In 2021, Han made her film debut with the independent film When Winter Comes, which premiered at the 22nd Jeonju International Film Festival (JIFF). Later that year, she also played the lead in her first theatrical release, Cinema Street. She was further cast as one of the leads in the web series Work Later, Drink Now, portraying the character of Han Ji-yeon across two seasons, a role that marked a significant breakthrough in her acting career, culminating in her receipt of the Excellence Award, Actress in an OTT Drama at the 8th APAN Star Awards.

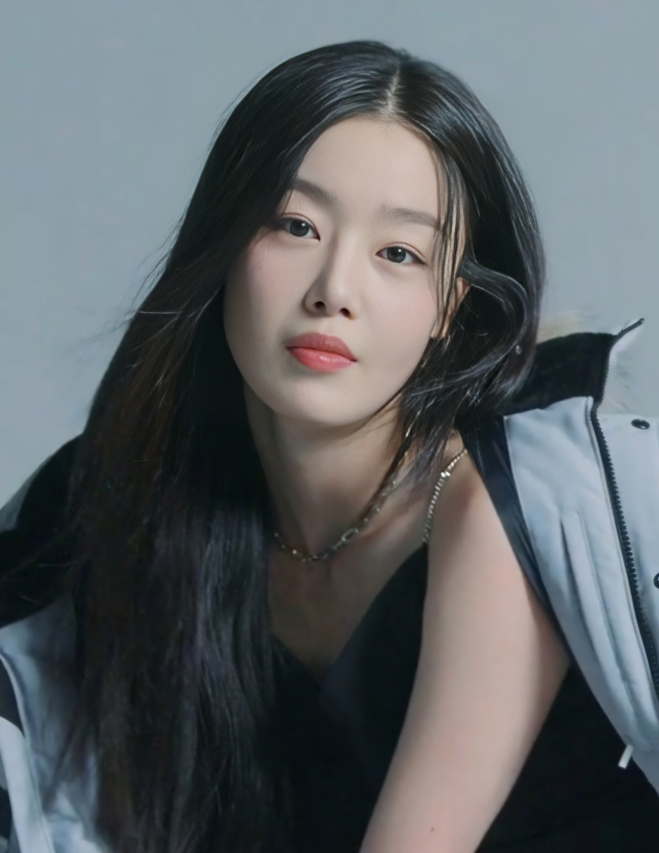
Han during a photoshoot for World Vision Korea in 2022

In 2022, Han made a special appearance in the SBS drama Why Her. She later appeared in the solo drama O'PENing – The First Glance, alongside actors Lee Jae-in and Kang Gil-woo. She subsequently played the role of Hye-young in the thesis film A Letter from Kyoto, which premiered at the 27th Busan International Film Festival (BIFF) before its theatrical release in 2023.

In 2023, Han was cast in the film Honey Sweet.

In 2024, Han took on the female lead role in the JTBC drama My Sweet Mobster, reuniting with actor Um Tae-goo, with whom she previously worked in the 2019 drama Save Me 2. In both productions, Han and Um portrayed each other's love interests. She was cast as Han Jung-mi, a YouTuber and the younger sister of Han Jung-woo (played by actor Jo Jung-suk), in the comedy film Pilot. Furthermore, she contributed as the talent donor for the short film Love Letter to the Dog.

In February 2025, Han was cast as the main lead, playing the role of Kang Eun-kyung, a student teacher in the comedy horror film Teaching Practice: Idiot Girls and School Ghost 2. Later that year, her performance in the film earned her the Korean Fantastic Actor Award at the 29th Bucheon International Fantastic Film Festival (BIFAN). In September 2025, she held her first solo fan meeting, "Attractive Sunhwa log," of her 16-year career.

On April 2, 2026, it was officially announced that Han had signed an exclusive contract with Ghost Studio.

== Artistry ==
=== Musical style influences and acting training ===
Han has said from childhood that she has been influenced by pop and R&B groups such as Fin.K.L, S.E.S. and Shinhwa. Han credits BoA as one of her major influences and idols. She also credits BoA's singing and dancing as influencing her to pursue a musical career. Additionally, she underwent formal vocal and acting training as a participant in the SBS talent show Superstar Survival.

=== Literary interests and authorship pursuits ===
In a 2024 episode of her former YouTube channel 궁금한선화 (Curious Sunhwa), Han shared that she has a passion for reading, often visiting bookstores to find comfort during stressful or frustrating periods. She also reflected on a solo trip to Croatia, describing it as a meaningful experience that allowed her to reconnect with herself and focus on personal growth. The trip inspired introspection, which led South Korean journalist and writer Kwak Jung-eun to suggest that Han write a book, indicating a potential future path as an author. Han stated that this is something she might pursue if the opportunity arises in the future.

== Public image ==
During the early career of Secret, the group initially received limited attention following its debut before achieving greater recognition with subsequent releases. During this period, Han became known for an "airhead" (백치미) variety-show persona in television appearances, and was occasionally referred to in variety programs with playful labels such as "Baekji Sunhwa" and "Baekchi Sunhwa". However, during a 2010 broadcast of Invincible Youth, Han clarified, in a humorous but also revealing manner, that the persona had been crafted as a concept by the CEO of TS Entertainment for Secret's promotional activities and that she had been instructed not to break character, prompting early public discussion about the agency's role in shaping her public image during the group's formative years.

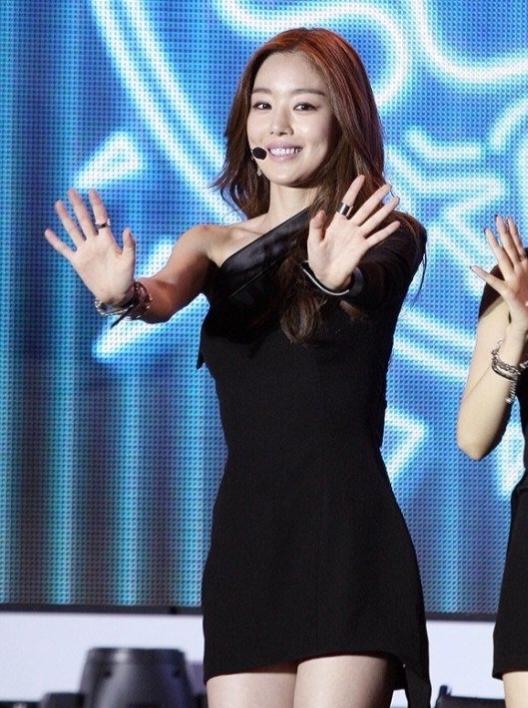
Han during promotions for Secret Summer, her final album with Secret, in August 2014

In 2015, after fellow Secret member Jung Ha-na referred to Han as being "dissatisfied with the world and prone to grumbling" during a variety-show discussion about the four members' drinking habits, Han responded via Twitter, stating that what had been described as her having "a lot of complaints about the world" was instead her seeking advice and support from Jung and other members in the past, rather than expressing complaints, and that she felt burdened by the expectation of maintaining a manufactured variety-show image created by her agency, which did not reflect her actual personality. She added that Jung's remarks were made without full context and that she responded publicly on Twitter to address potential misunderstandings. Group leader Jun Hyo-seong later stated that Han's remarks had been misinterpreted and were not directed as criticism toward Jung. However, Han responded on Twitter disputing Jun's explanation, which led to renewed attention to her earlier statements about agency-imposed image expectations and her having sought advice and support from fellow members over an extended period. In a separate interview, Han stated that she understood that she could also be subject to such misunderstandings without full context, referring to so-called "actor's disease", a term used to describe actors being perceived as overly conscious of their image or behaving in a serious manner. Meanwhile, TS Entertainment said there was no internal discord and that the matter was not considered significant. Han subsequently left the group and the agency in 2016, making the 2014 album Secret Summer her final release with the group. TS Entertainment later became involved in multiple legal disputes with its remaining artists and was described by some media outlets as having abusive management practices, drawing attention to issues involving the agency's management of both its remaining and former artists.

"My MBTI is INFP. I think I've always been close to an introverted extrovert. Honestly, I was even more introverted as a child. I like calm things, but I don’t want to be drawn only to that side. When I'm alone at home, I feel 'bored' but also think 'going out is such a hassle.' Being alone feels lonely, and loneliness is scary, so I want to go out, but I’m not the type to reach out to people first. I go out when someone contacts me. So, I have both a calm side and a lively side within me."

— Han, on her "INFP" personality.

In 2022, Han stated in an interview that her MBTI personality type is "INFP" and has described herself as having both introverted and outgoing tendencies. "INFP" is an MBTI personality type that stands for Introverted, Intuitive, Feeling, and Perceiving. Han identifies as INFP, blending introversion with sociability. This shapes her acting, favoring poetic narratives and immersive preparation, as seen in When Winter Comes. Han's INFP personality, characterized by her self-described idealism and emotional nature, is reflected in her deep connection to reading, finding comfort in books like journalist and writer Kwak Jung-eun's 우리는 어째서 이토록 (Why Are We Like This) at bookstores during challenging times. It has also led her to consider the possibility of writing book and potentially becoming an author in the future. Han is also known for her composed and courteous demeanor in public settings, with her ability to handle unexpected and potentially awkward situations gracefully drawing praise.

== Endorsements and ambassadorships ==
=== 2010s ===
Aside from her works with Secret, she also became active in acting, modelling and frequently participating in variety shows. In November 2010, Han won the best wedding dress idol award on MBC's Bouquet which landed her a magazine cover feature on Wedding 21's December issue.

On February 2, 2011, Han guested on the KBS's Lunar New Year special, Idol Health Beauty Contest, during which she was chosen as the star with the healthiest and most beautiful skin. Han, along with many other female idols, participated in a skin evaluation by selected professionals. In the end, results showed that Han's skin appeared 10 years younger than her actual age. In April 2011, Han was chosen as the model for the cosmetics company The Skin House. Han reportedly received a $100,000 deposit for her six-month contract. On May 29, 2014, the company announced that it had extended its exclusive modeling contract with Han for the third time.

Along with Secret, Han has been featured as a model for various endorsement deals such as Grand Mer, Nike, Nene Chicken, Good Day Soju, and Parkga among others. Along with Jun Hyo-seong, B.A.P's Kim Him-chan and Bang Yong-guk, Han was chosen as a model for Kellan sportswear 11/12 Winter Collection in September 2011.

In February 2015, Han signed a deal with popular handbag brand St. Scott LONDON as their exclusive model for Spring/Summer 2015 collection. In August 2015, it was announced that Han, along with Super Junior's Choi Si-won, would be the honorary ambassador of the 11th Jecheon International Music & Film Festival (JIMFF).

In June 2019, Han was appointed as the promotional ambassador for the 2nd World Drone Fishing Competition, hosted by Segye Ilbo, and attended the appointment ceremony at Seorae Island in Banpo Hangang Park, Seoul.

=== 2020–present ===
In 2022, Han appeared in endorsements for several brands. In January, she became a brand model for Soomgo, a South Korean local services marketplace, and in March, for I'm Real, a color mask brand. In June, she was appointed as the brand ambassador for Compagna, a women's clothing brand. In February 2025, the brand confirmed the continuation of their partnership with Han for the third consecutive year.

In February 2023, Han was named the brand muse for Public Beacon, a South Korean fashion eyewear brand. In May 2023, she featured as the brand model for Kooksoondang makgeolli. As part of the Kooksoondang campaign, a YouTube commercial titled "Han Sun-hwa's Happiness in a Liquor Commercial" was released, which accumulated 6.4 million views as of April 2024.

In September 2025, Han appeared in the first episode of the promotional web drama series His Imagination Doesn't Become Reality for SK Telecom, South Korea's largest wireless carrier and a subsidiary of the SK Group, to advertise its T Membership benefits. The series was released on the company's YouTube channel. In November 2025, she starred as a brand model in a social media commercial for CJ CheilJedang's Beksul 10-Min Cook line of Korean meal sauces. The digital campaign quickly gained traction, surpassing 10 million views within its first week of release.

== Discography ==
=== Singles ===
List of singles, showing year released, selected chart positions, and name of the album
Title	Year	Peak chart positions		Album
Title	Year	KOR Gaon	KOR Hot	Album
As lead artist
"Everything Is Pretty" (with Youngjae)	2012	22	18	Non-album single
"The Night With You"	2021	—	—	Work Later, Drink Now OST
As featured artist
"My Boo" (Untouchable feat. Jun Hyo-seong & Han Sun-hwa)	2009	—	—	Untouchable: First Mini Album
Collaborations
"Mermaid Princess" (M인어공주) (with Jiyoung, Bora, Han Sun-hwa, Gayoon & Lizzy)	2012	—	—	SBS Gayo Daejun The Color Of K-Pop – Mystic White
"—" denotes a recording that did not chart or was not released in that territory

== Filmography ==
Key
†	Denotes films that have not yet been released

=== Film ===
Year	Title	Role	Notes	Ref.
2021	When Winter Comes	Yang Young-ae		
2021	Cinema Street	Gil Sun-hwa		
2021	Tomb of the River	Han Bo-ram		
2022	Girls in the Cage	Park Ha-na		
2022	A Letter from Kyoto	Jang Hye-young		
2022	Daemuga	Morning drama actress	Special appearance	
2023	Honey Sweet	Paeng Eun-sook		
2024	Pilot	Han Jung-mi		
2024	Love Letter to the Dog	The Woman	Short film	
2025	Teaching Practice: Idiot Girls and School Ghost 2	Kang Eun-kyung		
2025	The First Ride	Jin Ok-sim		
2026	Judge Girl	Kim Jin-hee	Special appearance	
2026	The Table: Day and Night	Sang-mi	Opening film of BIFF	
2027	Typhoon †	Rose		

=== Television series ===
Year	Title	Role	Notes	Ref.
2010	More Charming by the Day	Kim Tae-hee	Cameo (Episode 3–4)	
2010	All My Love for You	Han Sun-hwa	Cameo (Episode 27)	
2013	Ad Genius Lee Tae-baek	Lee So-ran		
2014	God's Gift: 14 Days	Jenny		
2014	Marriage, Not Dating	Kang Se-ah		
2014–2015	Rosy Lovers	Baek Jang-mi		
2017	Frozen Love	Han Young-sil / Jang Ha-da	Drama special	
2017	Radiant Office	Ha Ji-na		
2017	School 2017	Han Soo-ji		
2017	Children of the 20th Century	Jung Da-young	Special appearance	
2018	My Contracted Husband, Mr. Oh	Jang Eun-jo		
2018	Tempted	Lawyer	Special appearance	
2018	Drama Stage	Yoon	Episode: "Goodbye My Life Insurance"	
2019	Save Me 2	Go Eun-ah / Go Madam		
2020	Backstreet Rookie	Yoo Yeon-joo		
2021	Undercover	Young Choi Yeon-soo	Special appearance	
2022	Why Her	Kang Eun-seo	Special appearance	
2022	O'PENing	Seo Jin-ah	Episode: "The First Glance"	
2024	My Sweet Mobster	Go Eun-ha		
2025	The Divorce Insurance	Gu Mi-rae	Special appearance (Episode 5–6)	
2026	We Are All Trying Here	Jang Mi-ran		

=== Web series ===
Year	Title	Role	Notes	Ref.
2021–2023	Work Later, Drink Now	Han Ji-yeon	Season 1–2	
2025	His Imagination Doesn't Become Reality	Sun-hwa	Commercial for SK Telecom's T Membership benefits; presented as a web series (Episode 1: "This Month's Pick: You")	
2026	The Scandal	Bun-hui		

=== Television shows ===
Year	Title	Role	Notes	Ref.
2005	Superstar Survival	Contestant	Finalist	
2007	Dizzy Blind Date	Contestant		
2009	Secret Story	Cast member		
2009–2010	Invincible Youth	Cast member	Season 1	
2010	I Need a Family	Cast member	As second daughter (Season 4)	
2010	Entertainers	Host		
2010	Bouquet	Cast member		
2010	Goguma	Cast member		
2012–2013	We Got Married	Cast member	With Hwang Kwang-hee	
2017	King of Mask Singer	Contestant	As "Lady Gaga" (Episode 123)	
2022	Women in Mountain Mountaineers	Cast member		
2022	Magic Wardrobe 2	Host		
2025	My Little Old Boy	Host	Episode 463	
2025–2026	Jeong Seung-je's Boarding House	Cast member		

=== Web shows ===
Year	Title	Role	Notes	Ref.
2022	Saturday Night Live Korea	Host	Season 2 – Episode 3	
2024	Curious Sunhwa	Host		
2025	The First Ride: A Great Chemistry Show	Cast member		
2026	ENA Snack Bar	Host		

=== Hosting ===
Year	Title	Notes	Ref.
2021	2021 KBS Entertainment Awards	With Kim Sung-joo and Moon Se-yoon	
2022	Opening ceremony of 26th Bucheon International Fantastic Film Festival	With Park Byung-eun	
2022	Closing ceremony of 27th Busan International Film Festival	with Kwon Yul	

== Accolades ==
=== Awards and nominations ===
Name of the award ceremony, year presented, category, nominee of the award, and the result of the nomination
Award ceremony	Year	Category	Nominee / Work	Result	Ref.
APAN Star Awards	2022	Excellence Award, Actress in an OTT Drama	Work Later, Drink Now	Won	
Asia Artist Awards	2024	Popularity Award – Actress	My Sweet Mobster	Nominated	
Baeksang Arts Awards	2015	Best New Actress – Television	Rosy Lovers	Nominated	
Baeksang Arts Awards	2025	Best Supporting Actress – Film	Pilot	Nominated	
Blue Dragon Film Awards	2023	Best Supporting Actress	Honey Sweet	Nominated	
Blue Dragon Film Awards	2024	Best Supporting Actress	Pilot	Nominated	
Bucheon International Fantastic Film Festival	2025	Korean Fantastic Actor	Teaching Practice: Idiot Girls and School Ghost 2	Won	
Director's Cut Awards	2025	Best New Actress (Film)	Pilot	Nominated	
Golden Cinematography Awards	2026	Cinematographers' Choice Popularity Award	The First Ride	Won	
Korea First Brand Awards	2025	Promising Actress (Film) to Lead in 2025	Han Sun-hwa	Nominated	
MBC Drama Awards	2014	Best New Actress	Rosy Lovers	Won	
MBC Drama Awards	2014	Best Couple Award	Han Sun-hwa (with Lee Jang-woo); Rosy Lovers	Nominated	
MBC Drama Awards	2014	Popularity Award, actress	Rosy Lovers	Nominated	
MBC Drama Awards	2017	Excellence Award, Actress in a Miniseries	Radiant Office	Won	
MBC Drama Awards	2018	Excellence Award, Actress in a Weekend Special Project	My Contracted Husband, Mr. Oh	Nominated	
MBC Entertainment Awards	2012	Best Newcomer in a Variety Show (Female)	We Got Married	Nominated	
MBC Entertainment Awards	2012	Best Couple Award	Han Sun-hwa (with Hwang Kwang-hee); We Got Married	Nominated	
SBS Drama Awards	2014	New Star Award	God's Gift: 14 Days	Won	
SBS Drama Awards	2020	Excellence Award, Actress in a Miniseries Fantasy/Romance Drama	Backstreet Rookie	Nominated	
Seoul International Youth Film Festival	2014	Best Young Actress	Marriage, Not Dating	Nominated	

=== Listicles ===
Name of publisher, year listed, name of listicle, and placement
Publisher	Year	Listicle	Placement	Ref.
CNN International Seoul	2011	9 Rising "It" Stars (Note: Introduces 9 young entertainers from singing, acting, modeling, and variety shows as the next generation of Korea's "multi-tasking superstars.")	Included	
Harper's Bazaar Korea	2021	10 Trending Celebrities with Notable Impact (Note: Introduces 10 trending celebrities recognized for their notable impact in their respective fields.)	Included	
JoyNews24	2024	Rising Stars of the Year (Film) (Note: Introduces the results of a survey of 200 entertainment industry insiders on the dramas, variety shows, movies, actors, and singers that shined in 2024, conducted for JoyNews24's 20th anniversary.)	Included	
