= Studio Santa Claus Entertainment =

South Korean talent management agency and television production company

Studio Santa Claus Entertainment Co., Ltd.
- Native name: 스튜디오 산타클로스엔터테인먼트
- Formerly: Hyundai Dream Together No. 2 Special Purpose Acquisition Company (2014–2015); Sim Entertainment (2015–2016); Huayi Brothers Entertainment (2016–2017); Huayi Brothers Korea (2017-July 2020); Fleet Entertainment (July–August 2020)
- Type: Public
- Traded as: KRX: 204630
- Industry: Entertainment
- Founded: December 30, 2004 as Sim Entertainment Co., Ltd.
- Founder: Sim Jung-woon
- Headquarters: Seoul, South Korea
- Key people: Jay Sung-beom Ji (CEO)
- Services: talent management, television production
- Owner: Loa & Co.: 53.69%
- Parent: Loa & Co.
- Subsidiaries: Merry Christmas
- Website: studiosantaent.com

Studio Santa Claus Entertainment (Korean: 스튜디오 산타클로스엔터테인먼트), is a South Korean talent management agency and television production company. It currently operates as a subsidiary of Loa & Co..

== History ==
Its original name was SIM Entertainment, and established in 2004 as a sole proprietorship company in December. Converted to corporation in August, 2005.

In 2016, Huayi Brothers Media, China's leading film studio, has bought a 26% stake in SIM Entertainment.

At the 4th APAN Star Awards, the agency's founder and former CEO Sim Jung-woon won the award for Best Manager. In July 2020, the company renamed as Fleet Entertainment and then changed again into Studio Santa Claus Entertainment in August 2020 and the company became independent.

On November 1, 2022, Studio Santa Claus Entertainment announced its management business downsizing. "We will temporarily reduce the size of the existing management division and create synergy in the drama and film production business through partnerships with talented production companies."

== Artists ==
=== Current ===
- Kim Hye-ok
- Choi Ji-woo
- Kim Young-sun
- Cheon Yun-kyung
- Yeom Ji-young
- Jung Hwae-rin
- Kim Seung-hee
- Kim Joo-ah
- Lee Woo-jin
- Lee Hyun-geol
- Kwon Hyuk
- Han Ki-woong
- Jeon Young-chan
- Ahn Eun-ho

=== Former ===
- Cha Hyun-seung (2021–?)
- Cha Seung-hwan
- Chae Seo-jin (2017–?)
- Choi Tae-joon (2017–?)
- Choi Kwon
- Chae Seo-jin (2017–?)
- Gil Hae-yeon
- Go Joo-won (2017–2019)
- Ha Hyun-wook
- Ha Yeon-joo
- Han Sun-hwa (2016–2020)
- Hwang Woo-seul-hye
- Im Hyun-joo (2024–2025)
- Jeon Mi-seon
- Jeon So-min (2024–2026)
- Jeon Soo-jin (2017–2019)
- Jeon Young-Chan
- Jeong Hoe-rin
- Ji Yoon-ho (2016–?)
- Joo Jin-mo (2016–2022)
- Joo Won
- Jung Da-bin
- Jung Hye-sung
- Kang Byul
- Kang Ji-hwan (2015–2017, 2019)
- Kang Shin-il
- Kim Hae-won
- Kim Ju-hyeon
- Kim Min-jae
- Kim Ok-vin (2017–2022)
- Kim Sang-ho
- Kim Seung-hee
- Kim So-hyun
- Kim Sung-oh (2017–2022)
- Kim Yoon-seok
- Kim Jung-eun
- Lee Da-hee (2016–2022)
- Lee Dong-hwi (2014–2020)
- Lee Joo-hyung
- Lee Sang-kyeong
- Lee Seon-ho
- Lee Si-young (2016–2020)
- Lee Su-woong (2018–2022)
- Lee Yeong-hoon
- Lee Woo-je
- Lim Ji-yeon (2014–2020)
- Lim Yoon-ho
- Min Jin-woong
- Mu Jin-sung
- Oh Hyun-kyung
- Oh Min-soo
- Park Bo-ram (2018–2022)
- Park Eun-ji
- Park Hye-soo
- Park Joo-mi (2019–2022)
- Park Se-wan
- Seo Young-hee (2017–2022)
- Song Sae-byeok (2018–2022)
- Soo Ae (2019–2022)
- Uhm Jung-hwa (2005–2015)
- Uhm Tae-woong (2005–2015, 2018–2022)
- Yoo Gun
- Yoo Hae-jin

== Productions ==
=== Film ===
- Steal My Heart (2013, in partnership with So-net Entertainment)
- Another Child (2019, in partnership with Redpeter Films)

=== Television ===
- Mask (2015, SBS, in partnership with Golden Thumb)
- Webtoon Hero Toondra Show (2015, MBC every1, in partnership with MBC Plus Media and YLAB)
- Lucky Romance (2016, MBC)
- My Sassy Girl (2017, SBS, in partnership with RaemongRaein and ShinCine Communication)
- The Emperor: Owner of the Mask (2017, MBC, in partnership with People Story Company)
- 20th Century Boy and Girl (2017, MBC)
- Joseon Survival Period (2019, TV Chosun, in partnership with Lotte Cultureworks and HIGROUND)
- The Great Show (2019, tvN, in partnership with Lotte Cultureworks and Studio Dragon)
- My Name (2021, Netflix original)
- Rest in Peace (TBA, in partnership with Studio N)
