= Star Empire Entertainment discography =

This is a list of albums and released under Star Empire Entertainment record label.

== 2000s ==
=== 2001–2003 ===
Released	Title	Artist	Format	Language
20 March 2001	"Discovery"	Jewelry	Studio Album	Korean
10 August 2002	"Again '02"	Jewelry	Studio Album	Korean
5 July 2003	"Beloved"	Jewelry	Studio Album	Korean

=== 2004 ===
Released	Title	Artist	Format	Language
3 March 2004	"Kokoro ga Tomaranai (My Heart Will Not Stop)"	Jewelry	CD Single	Japanese
15 May 2004	"The Real"	V.O.S	Studio Album	Korean
16 July 2004	"Mune Ippai no Kono Ai wo Dare Yori Kimi ni (You Have This Love in my Heart)"	Jewelry	CD Single	Japanese
25 August 2004	"Delight Sweet Life"	Jewelry	CD Single	Japanese

=== 2005 ===
Released	Title	Artist	Format	Language
1 January 2005	"Shiro no Fantasy (Fantasy of White)"	Jewelry	CD Single, Digital Download	Japanese
9 March 2005	"JEWELRY First"	Jewelry	Studio Album, Digital Download	Japanese
14 March 2005	"Super Star"	Jewelry	Studio Album, Digital Download	Korean
10 June 2005	"Passion"	Jewelry	Digital Download	Korean
27 July 2005	"SUPER STAR"	Jewelry	Studio Album, Digital Download	Japanese
25 November 2005	"Blue Castle"	V.O.S	Studio Album, Digital Download	Korean

=== 2006–2007 ===
Released	Title	Artist	Format	Language
8 June 2006	"The first time"	V.O.S	CD Single, Digital Download	Korean
25 August 2006	"Yeah"	Park Jung Ah	Studio Album, Digital Download	Korean
10 May 2007	"One & Only"	Poppin Hyun Joon	Studio Album, Digital Download	Korean

=== 2008 ===
Released	Title	Artist	Format	Language
20 February 2008	"Kitchi Island"	Jewelry	Studio Album, Digital Download	Korean
29 April 2008	"Kitchi Island 2 (Remix)"	Jewelry	Digital Download	Korean
15 May 2008	"Wonderful Things"	V.O.S	Studio Album, Digital Download	Korean

=== 2009 ===
Released	Title	Artist	Format	Language
22 January 2009	"Sweet Song"	Jewelry S	CD Single, Digital Download	Korean
27 May 2009	"Routine Free"	V.O.S	Mini Album, Digital Download	Korean
19 July 2009	"Superstar"	Jewelry	Digital Download	Korean
27 August 2009	"Sophisticated"	Jewelry	Studio Album, Digital Download	Korean
17 December 2009	"End And.. (Repackage)"	Jewelry	Studio Album, Digital Download	Korean

== 2010s ==
=== 2010 ===
Released	Title	Artist	Format	Language
1 January 2010	"Nativity"	ZE:A	CD Single, Digital Download	Korean
3 March 2010	"This id Voice of soul"	V.O.S	Compilation Album	Korean
3 May 2010	"LEAP FOR DETONATION"	ZE:A	CD Single, Digital Download	Korean
4 June 2010	"LOVE COACH (Rude Questian Remix)"	ZE:A	Digital Download	Japanese
8 July 2010	"Level Up"	ZE:A	Digital Download	Korean
22 July 2010	"Summer"	V.O.S	Digital Download	Korean
3 August 2010	"Di Guo Jing Xuan (Empire Hits)"	ZE:A	CD Album	Taiwan
12 August 2010	"Let's have a party"	Nine Muses	CD Single, Digital Download	Korean
20 September 2010	"The Blue Bird"	V.O.S	Mini Album, Digital Download	Korean
22 September 2010	"ZE:A!"	ZE:A	Studio Album, Digital Download	Japanese
15 November 2010	"Memories"	V.O.S	Mini Album, Digital Download	Korean
22 December 2010	"Love Letter"	ZE:A	CD Single, Digital Download	Japanese

=== 2011 ===
Released	Title	Artist	Format	Language
14 January 2011	"My Only Wish "	ZE:A	CD Single	Taiwan
27 January 2011	"Back It Up"	Jewelry	Digital Download	Korean
5 February 2011	"Thailand Thank You Album"	ZE:A	Mini Album	Thai
17 March 2011	"LOVABILITY"	ZE:A	Studio Album, Digital Download	Korean
27 April 2011	"Here I am"	ZE:A	Mini Album, Digital Download	Japanese
16 May 2011	"Pass"	Jewelry	Digital Download	Korean
18 August 2011	"Figaro"	Nine Muses	Digital Download	Korean
24 August 2011	"Watch Out!! (Netsuai Chuuihou)"	ZE:A	CD Single, Digital Download	Japanese
21 September 2011	"Ames Room Vol.2"	Jewelry S	CD Single, Digital Download	Korean
23 November 2011	"Daily Daily"	ZE:A	CD Single, Digital Download	Japanese
30 November 2011	"Shooting Star"	Star Empire (Park Jung-ah, Seo In-young, ZE:A, Nine Muses, Jewelry)	CD Single, Digital Download	Korean

=== 2012 ===
Released	Title	Artist	Format	Language
11 January 2012	"News "	Nine Muses	Digital Download	Korean
13 January 2012	"The Most Powerful ZE:A... Ever!"	ZE:A	CD Single	Taiwan
8 March 2012	"Sweet Rendezvous"	Nine Muses	Mini Album, Digital Download	Korean
4 July 2012	"Spectacular"	ZE:A	Studio Album, Digital Download	Korean
24 August 2012	"Phoenix"	ZE:A	Studio Album, Digital Download	Japanese
27 August 2012	"Phoenix"	ZE:A	CD Single, Digital Download	Korean
11 October 2012	"LOOK AT ME"	Jewelry	Mini Album, Digital Download	Korean
7 December 2012	"Beautiful Girl"	ZE:A	Digital Download	Korean

=== 2013 ===
Released	Title	Artist	Format	Language
24 January 2013	"Dolls"	Nine Muses	CD Single, Digital Download	Korean
7 February 2013	"The Classic"	ZE:A5	CD Single, Digital Download	Japanese
3 March 2013	"Voulez-vous"	ZE:A5	Mini Album, Digital Download	Korean
9 May 2013	"Wild"	Nine Muses	Mini Album, Digital Download	Korean
5 July 2013	"Hot & Cold"	Jewelry	Digital Download	Korean
9 August 2013	"Illusion"	ZE:A	Mini Album, Digital Download	Korean
14 October 2013	Prima Donna	Nine Muses	Studio Album	Korean
4 December 2013	Glue	Nine Muses	Digital Download	Korean

=== 2014 ===
Released	Title	Artist	Format	Language
13 March 2014	"So Real Story"	So Real	Mini Album, Digital Download	Korean
2 June 2014	"First Homme"	ZE:A	Mini Album, Digital Download	Korean
3 September 2014	"Knock"	Nasty Nasty	Digital Download	Korean

=== 2015 ===
Released	Title	Artist	Format	Language
21 January 2015	"Roulette"	ZE:A J	CD, Digital Download	Korean/Japanese
23 January 2015	"Drama"	Nine Muses	Mini Album	Korean
10 March 2015	"Someday"	V.O.S	Digital Download	Korean
2 July 2015	"9Muses S/S Edition"	Nine Muses	Mini Album	Korean
8 August 2015	"Marry Me"	ZE:A J	CD, Digital Download	Chinese
2 September 2015	"Love to You"	ZE:A J	CD, Digital Download	Japanese
18 September 2015	"Best Album"	ZE:A	Studio Album, Digital Download	Korean
24 November 2015	"Lost"	Nine Muses	Mini Album	Korean

=== 2016 ===
Released	Title	Artist	Format	Language
27 January 2016	Lollipop	Imfact	CD Single, Digital Download	Korean
20 April 2016	"Just Tonight"	ZE:AJ	Mini Album	Japanese
21 April 2016	"Collection"	Kevin	CD, Digital Download	Korean
26 April 2016	"First Love"	Heecheol	CD, Digital Download	Korean
1 May 2016	"Confession"	Hyuna, Hyemi	Digital Download	Korean
3 May 2016	"Healing"	Kim Dong-jun	CD, Digital Download	Korean
9 May 2016	"As I Am"	Hyuna, Keumjo	Digital Download	Korean
14 May 2016	"If You Like It"	Hyemi	Digital Download	Korean
28 May 2016	"For My Lady"	ZE:A After	CD Single, Digital Download	Korean/Japanese
3 June 2016	"Hugged By You"	Seo In Young	Digital Download	Korean
20 July 2016	"Merry Summer"	Seo In Young	Digital Download	Korean
4 August 2016	Muses Diary	9Muses A	CD Single, Digital Download	Korean
11 September 2016	"The Best"	Seo In Young X Crown J	Digital Download	Korean
14 October 2016	"Eyes Nose Lips"	Jian & Lee Sang	Digital Download	Korean
11 November 2016	"Revolt"	Imfact	CD Single, Digital Download	Korean
23 December 2016	"Nostalgia"	Sojin & Keumjo	Digital Download	Korean

=== 2017 ===
Released	Title	Artist	Format	Language
25 January 2017	In The Club	Imfact	Digital Download	Korean
7 February 2017	Planet	Sojin	Digital Download	Korean
27 February 2017	Please Be My First Love	Imfact	Digital Download	Korean
4 April 2017	Tension Up	Imfact	Digital Download	Korean
5 May 2017	Tension Up	Imfact	Mini Album	Japanese
17 May 2017	Talk About You	Kyungri	Digital Download	Korean
19 June 2017	Muses Diary Part 2: Identity	Nine Muses	Mini Album	Korean
3 August 2017	Muses Diary Part 3. Love City	Nine Muses	Mini Album Repackaged	Korean
8 September 2017	The Rosso	Minwoo	Mini Album	Japanese
12 December 2017	Line Friends	Yunji x Dawon	Digital Download	Korean
18 December 2017	4Love	Kyungri x Jinwoon	Digital Download	Korean

=== 2018 ===
Released	Title	Artist	Format	Language
15 January 2018	The One	Minwoo	Digital Download	Japanese
8 February 2018	I'm looking for	Hyokyung	Digital Download	Korean
27 March 2018	Bom Bom	Kyungri x Choi Nakta	Digital Download	Korean
17 April 2018	The Light	Imfact	Digital Download	Korean
4 May 2018	What are you doing tonight?	Kyungri x It's	Digital Download	Korean
5 July 2018	Blue Moon	Kyungri	Digital Download	Korean
16 August 2018	NANANA	Imfact	Digital Download	Korean
3 December 2018	Repetition	Lee Sang	Digital Download	Korean
13 December 2018	Uncorrected	Jian	Digital Download	Korean

=== 2019 ===
Released	Title	Artist	Format	Language
7 January 2019	Vanilla Sky	Ungjae	Digital Download	Korean
24 January 2019	Only U	Imfact	Single Album	Korean
14 February 2019	Remember	Nine Muses	Digital Single	Korean
24 October 2019	Grand Opera	ARIAZ	Mini Album	Korean

=== 2020 ===
Released	Title	Artist	Format	Language
21 April 2020	Lie	Imfact	Digital Download	Korean
28 April 2020	L.L	Imfact	Mini Album	Korean
