= Again (Jewelry album) =

Studio album by Jewelry
- Released: July 31, 2002
- Genres: R&B, pop
- Labels: Star Empire Entertainment; EnterOne

Jewelry chronology
Discovery (2001)	Again (2002)	Beloved (2003)

Alternative Cover
- Promotional Album Cover

Again (also known as Again '02) is the second studio album by K-pop group, Jewelry. It was released on July 31, 2002 on Star Empire Entertainment.

== Overview ==
The "Again" concept featured a much more mature image from the previous one, dropping the cute image they once had with their debut, and gaining two new members, Seo In Young and Cho Min Ah. The entire album consists of R&B ballads (with an exception of four songs: 1492... (T.T;), which has a dance R&B sound and is also a cover of Atomic Kitten's song, See Ya, How Are You?, a dance-pop song which features rap vocals by Lee Ji Hyun and Park Jung Ah, One Summer Night, a pure pop song, and Cool Girl, another R&B dance song), completely opposed to the sexy R&B songs that were popular at that time. This album started the rise of popularity for Jewelry, with the two singles, Again (which is considered their first mega hit song) and Tonight being critically praised and very popular; charting high on the Korean Music Charts. These singles were performed frequently, which boosted album sales, and has guaranteed the album success. Although "How Are You?" wasn't an official single and wasn't performed at all, it became a very popular song from the album, which caused it to chart as well. Fans consider "'Again'" as one of, if not their best, albums to date.

== Track listing ==
No.	Title	Lyrics	Music	Arrangement	Length
1.	"Cool Girl"	Disco Fighter, Kang Sang Hun, Kim Ga-nyeon	Disco Fighter, Kang Sang Hun, Kim Ga-nyeon	Disco Fighter, Kang Sang Hun, Kim Ga-nyeon	3:29
2.	"Again"	Shin Min Wook(Minuki)	Park Geun-tae	Lee Seung-hwan	3:43
3.	"One Summer Night"	Disco Fighter, Kang Sang Hun, Kim Ga-nyeon	Disco Fighter, Kang Sang Hun, Kim Ga-nyeon	Disco Fighter, Kang Sang Hun, Kim Ga-nyeon	3:35
4.	"To You"	Lee Yoon kyung	Minuki	Minuki	3:44
5.	"Tonight"	Shim Hyun Bo	Yoo Jung Yeon	Yoo Jung Yeon	4:13
6.	"선배"	Disco Fighter, Kang Sang Hun, Kim Ga-nyeon	Disco Fighter, Kang Sang Hun, Kim Ga-nyeon	Disco Fighter	3:59
7.	"How Are You?"	Lee Yong Hoon	Disco Fighter, Kang Sang Hun, Kim Ga-nyeon	Disco Fighter	3:28
8.	"말하지 못한 절반의 사랑"	Yang Jae Sun	Shim Sang Won	Shim Sang Won	4:13
9.	"Sad"	Lee Ji-hyun	Oh Seung-eun	Oh Seung-eun	3:46
10.	"1492... (T.T;)" (a cover of Atomic Kitten's song, See Ya)	Jung Min Woo	Jung Min Woo	Jung Min Woo	3:24
11.	"Maybe"	Shin Min Wook(Minuki)	Park Geun-tae	Park Geun-tae	3:40
12.	"이별은 모르게..."	Kim Jin Ah	Shim Sang-won	Shim Sang-won	4:07

== Promoted songs ==
- "Again"
- "Tonight"

== See also ==
- Park Jung-ah
- Seo In-young
- Jewelry
