= Beloved (Jewelry album) =

Studio album by Jewelry
- Released: July 4, 2003
- Genre: Pop
- Labels: Star Empire Entertainment; EnterOne

Jewelry chronology
Again (2002)	Beloved (2003)	Super Star (2005)

Beloved is the third studio album by K-pop group, Jewelry. It was released on July 4, 2003 on Star Empire Entertainment.

== Overview ==
In 2003, Jewelry returned to their previous "cute" concept, but less emphasis on the cuteness, unlike the first album. The group performed their comeback performance in June 2003, performing the lead single, 니가 참 좋아 (I Really Like You), and Be My Love. The album consists of pop songs, departing from the R&B ballad sound they once excelled in. The lead single, 니가 참 좋아 (I Really Like You), is a song about strong affection for another person, and was very popular upon its release, charting high on the charts and was performed frequently. The music video contained all four members unknowingly trying to get the attention of one guy, only to find out that he is interested in another girl. Another single was released, 바보야 (Fool), a song about a girl who adores a guy, but the guy is too oblivious to her feelings. The music video is a montage consisting of footage during promotion of Beloved. Despite being the second single, the song was never performed live. Be My Love was also promoted, and ended up being a popular song from the album, and was performed live many times (altered from the album version, also known as the TV version, including a dance break performed by Seo In Young). Beloved was a great seller, but Jewelry was unhappy with their current image, and wanted to break out of their "cutesy" concept.

== Track listing ==
No.	Title	Length
1.	"Be My Love"	3:44
2.	"니가 참 좋아 (I Really Like You)"	3:40
3.	"바보야 (Fool)"	3:04
4.	"사랑이란 이유로"	3:32
5.	"Fantasy"	4:16
6.	"Amore (아름다운 날들)"	4:45
7.	"고백"	4:34
8.	"So Long"	4:27
9.	"유혹"	3:43
10.	"끝"	3:19
11.	"Dear My Heart"	3:50
12.	"My Life"	4:46

== Promoted songs ==
- "Be My Love"
- "니가 참 좋아 (I Really Like You)"
- "바보야 (Fool)"

== Trivia ==
- On the album's cover, a short message explains the meaning of "Beloved" "(The lexicon meaning of "beloved" is stated "one who is much loved." The 3rd edition of JEWELRY additionally is expressing the reminiscence of love that we can feel in ordinary life. As for JEWELRY, "beloved" means either happiest moment or saddest.)"

== See also ==
- Park Jung-ah
- Seo In-young
- Jewelry
