= List of Build Up: Vocal Boy Group Survival contestants =

Build Up: Vocal Boy Group Survival is a South Korean reality competition show, where male vocalists ranging from current and former idol members, soloists, singer-songwriters, musical actors and individual trainees are competing to debut in a four-member vocal boy group. The 40 contestants are divided into four type of voice colors: Allround, Soul, Power, and Unique. After the final episode, the final top four contestants were selected to debut as members of the boy band, B.D.U (Boys Define Universe).

== Contestants ==
The English names of contestants are presented in accordance with the official website.

Color key

Final members of B.D.U
Contestant eliminated in the finals
Contestant eliminated in the semifinals
Contestant eliminated in the fourth round
Contestant eliminated in the third round
Contestant eliminated in the second round
Top 4 for the Episode

List of Build Up: Vocal Boy Group Survival contestants
Contestant	Age (Note: As of Episode 1 (January 26, 2024).)	Ranking					
Contestant	Age	Ep. 1		Ep. 2 (Note: Interim Aggregation Status as of February 2, 2024 at 12:00 (KST).)	Ep. 3 (Note: Interim Aggregation Status as of February 9, 2024 at 00:00 (KST).)	Ep. 4 (Note: Interim Aggregation Status as of February 16, 2024 at 12:00 (KST).)	Ep. 5 (Note: Interim Aggregation Status as of February 23, 2024 at 00:00 (KST).)
Contestant	Age	Voice Check-in (Note: In Voice Check-in, some contestants have the same votes so their ranks are also the same.)		Ep. 2	Ep. 3	Ep. 4	Ep. 5
Contestant	Age	#	Votes	#	#	#	#
Seunghun (Note: Seunghun is a member of CIX.) (Note: Seunghun and Kang Seok-hwa were a contestant in YG Treasure Box.) (승훈)	24	38	7	4	4	4	5
Jay Chang (Note: Jay Chang, Lim Jun-hyuk, Choi Su-hwan, Yu In-hwan, Jung Soo-min, and Park Je-up are a soloist.) (Note: Jay Chang is a member of One Pact.) (Note: Jay Chang, Bain, and Wumuti were a contestant in Under Nineteen.) (Note: Jay Chang, Wumuti, and Lee Hwan-hee were a contestant in Boys Planet.) (제이창)	22	10	23	1	1	1	1
Bain (Note: Bain and Geonu are a member of Just B.) (배인)	22	37	9	18	18	19	17
Sunyoul (Note: Sunyoul and Lee Hwan-hee are a member of Up10tion) (Note: Sunyoul was a contestant in Mr. Trot 2, Trot Fighter, Voice King, and Voice Trot.) (Note: Sunyoul, Jeong In-seong, and Lee Hwan-hee were a contestant in King of Mask Singer.) (선율)	27	8	24	15	14	14	14
Lim Jun-hyuk (Note: Lim Jun-hyuk is a former member of Day6.) (Note: Lim Jun-hyuk, Hyuk-jin, and Park Je-up were a contestant in The Unit: Idol Rebooting Project.) (임준혁)	30	38	7	29	39	37	38
Jeong In-seong (Note: Jeong In-seong is a member of KNK and former contestant in Duet Song Festival.) (Note: Jeong In-seong, Lee Dong-hun, Ma Jae-kyung, and Bitsaeon were a contestant in Mix Nine.) (정인성)	29	11	22	13	12	13	12
Kang Ha-yoon (Note: Kang Ha-yoon, Lim Sang-hyun, Taewoo, Hwang In-hyuk, and Neon are a singer-songwriter.) (Note: Kang Ha-yoon and Kwon Eui-bin were a contestant in Tomorrow's National Singer.) (Note: Kang Ha-yoon and Jung Soo-min were a contestant in Loud.) (강하윤)	20	3	27	17	17	15	15
Choi Ha-ram (Note: Choi Ha-ram, Kim Seong-jeong, Kim Seo-hyung, Hong Sung-won, and Jo Hwan-ji are a musical actor.) (Note: Choi Ha-ram is a pianist.) (Note: Choi Ha-ram was a contestant in Phantom Singer 4.) (최하람)	22	21	14	30	35	36	34
Lee Min-wook (Note: Lee Min-wook is a member of Newkidd.) (이민욱)	23	33	11	38	26	29	37
Geonu (Note: Geonu was a contestant in Dancing High and I-Land.) (건우)	22	33	11	10	11	12	13
Jeon Woong (Note: Jeon Woong is a member of AB6IX.) (전웅)	26	21	14	5	8	9	10
Wumuti (Note: Wumuti was a former member of Swin and its sub-unit Swin-S, and was a contestants in Road to Star, Super Idol, and The Dance and The Voice.) (우무티)	24	24	13	3	3	3	3
Taehwan (Note: Taehwan is a member of Vanner.) (Note: Taehwan, Ma Jae-kyung, Hong Seong-jun, and Bitsaeon were a contestant in Peak Time.) (태환)	29	31	12	11	10	11	11
Lim Sang-hyun (임상현)	26	4	25	34	28	28	28
Park Ju-he (Note: Park Ju-he, Ji Yeon-woo, Jeong Yun-seo, and Kim Min-seo are an individual trainee.) (박주희)	18	24	13	27	23	22	23
Kim Seong-jeong (김성정)	24	4	25	26	27	31	31
Choi Su-hwan (Note: Choi Su-hwan, Hong Seong-jun, and Kang Seok-hwa were a contestant in Produce X 101.) (최수환)	22	33	11	24	29	27	27
Kim Seo-hyung (김서형)	22	18	16	25	25	26	25
Lee Gwang-seok (Note: Lee Gwang-seok is a freelance model.) (이광석)	25	1	32	23	21	18	19
Lee Dong-hun (Note: Lee Dong-hun is a member of A.C.E.) (이동훈)	30	16	18	2	2	2	2
Hong Sung-won (홍선원)	25	14	21	20	22	25	26
Hyukjin (Note: Hyukjin is a member of Fave1, and was a former member of 100%.) (혁진)	30	36	10	19	19	21	24
Yun In-hwan (Note: Yun In-hwan was a former member of 1217.) (윤인환)	26	24	13	40	31	23	22
Ji Yeon-woo (Note: Ji Yeon-woo was a contestant in Extreme Debut: Wild Idol.) (지연우)	19	19	17	28	37	40	39
Ma Jae-kyung (Note: Ma Jae-kyung was a former member of Romeo.) (마재경)	27	31	12	32	33	32	30
Jo Hwan-ji (Note: Jo Hwan-ji was a contestant in Fantastic Duo 2 and Phantom Singer 3.) (조환지)	28	16	18	31	34	35	35
Hong Seong-jun (Note: Hong Seong-jun was a member of BDC.) (홍성준)	24	24	13	14	15	17	18
Taewoo (Note: Taewoo was a contestant in Sing Again 2 and Vocal Play.) (태우)	26	4	25	36	32	39	29
Hwang In-hyuk (Note: Hwang In-hyuk was a contestant in I Can See Your Voice 8 and Sing For Gold.) (황인혁)	25	11	22	39	30	30	32
Jung Soo-min (Note: Jung Soo-min was a contestant in Stars Awakening.) (정수민)	19	4	25	21	20	20	20
Jang In-tae (Note: Jang In-tae is a member of 415.) (장인태)	26	40	5	35	40	34	40
Jeong Yun-seo (정윤서)	19	24	13	37	36	38	36
Neon (네온)	28	24	13	16	16	16	16
Park Je-up (Note: Park Je-up is a member of Imfact and was a contestant in I Can See Your Voice 4 and Sing Again 3.) (박제업)	30	2	28	9	9	8	6
Kwon Eui-bin (Note: Kwon Eui-bin is a member of Clrock that was formed through The Idol Band: Boys' Battle.) (권의빈)	24	8	24	33	38	33	33
Bitsaeon (Note: Bitsaeon is a member of M.O.N.T.) (빛새온)	28	14	21	12	13	10	7
Kang Seok-hwa (Note: Kang Seok-hwa is a member of WEi.) (강석화)	23	20	15	8	5	5	4
Lee Hwan-hee (이환희)	25	21	14	6	7	6	9
Kim Min-seo (Note: Kim Min-seo was a contestant in The Origin – A, B, Or What?.) (김민서)	20	24	13	22	24	24	21
Yeo One (Note: Yeo One is a member of Pentagon.) (여원)	27	11	22	7	6	7	8

=== Prior to Build Up ===
Prior to Build Up

== Voice Check-in (Episode 1) ==
The Voice Check-in involved all the participating contestants to listen to each other's voice files and vote for the voice they want to build up with. The self-assessment is based on the votes of other 39 contestants.

Key

- Name – Allround
- Name – Soul
- Name – Power
- Name – Unique

Voice Check-in results
Performance		V#	Contestant	Self-assessment	Performance		V#	Contestant	Self-assessment
Original artist(s)	Song	V#	Contestant	Self-assessment	Original artist(s)	Song	V#	Contestant	Self-assessment
Aired (Note: Performances that entirely or partially aired on broadcast and are arranged by appearances on the show.)					Unaired (Note: Performances are arranged by contestants' voice number.)				
4Men	"Baby Baby"	V2	Jay Chang	23 votes	Hwasa	"María" (마리아)	V3	Bain	9 votes
Choi Beck-ho	"End of the Sea" (바다 끝)	V16	Kim Seong-jeong	25 votes	Shin Hyo-bum	"You Are the One I Love" (난 널 사랑해)	V5	Lim Jun-hyuk	7 votes
H1-Key	"Rose Blossom" (건물 사이에 피어난 장미)	V36	Bitsaeon	21 votes	Day6	"Letting Go" (놓아 놓아 놓아)	V6	Jeong In-seong	22 votes
Exo	"Miracles in December" (12월의 기적)	V20	Lee Dong-hun	18 votes	Johan Kim	"I Want To Fall In Love" (사랑에 빠지고 싶다)	V8	Choi Ha-ram	14 votes
(G)I-dle	"Tomboy"	V38	Lee Hwan-hee	14 votes	Eddy Kim	"The Manual" (너 사용법)	V9	Lee Min-wook	11 votes
Acoustic Collabo	"It's Strange, With You" (묘해, 너와)	V37	Kang Seok-hwa	15 votes	Jungkook	"Seven" (Clean ver.)	V12	Wumuti	13 votes
Jay Park	"Joah" (좋아)	V10	Geonu	11 votes	Park Hyo-shin	"Goodbye"	V13	Taehwan	12 votes
Paul Kim	"Rain" (비)	V1	Seunghun	7 votes	Kim Yeon-woo	"Parting Taxi" (이별택시)	V14	Lim Sang-hyun	25 votes
Adele	"One and Only"	V7	Kang Ha-yoon	27 votes	Shinee	"Stand By Me"	V15	Park Ju-he	13 votes
Crush	"Rush Hour (feat. J-Hope)"	V33	Neon	13 votes	NEXT	"Lazenca, Save Us"	V22	Hyukjin	10 votes
Christopher	"Bad"	V11	Jeon Woong	14 votes	Im Chang-jung	"A Guy Like Me" (나란놈이란)	V23	Yun In-hwan	13 votes
Zitten	"Let's Stay Well" (잘 지내자, 우리)	V40	Yeo One	22 votes	Charlie Puth	"Suffer"	V24	Ji Yeon-woo	17 votes
Kim Feel	"Someday, the Boy" (그때 그 아인)	V19	Lee Gwang-seok	32 votes	Kim Bum-soo	"It Will Pass" (지나간다)	V25	Ma Jae-kyung	12 votes
GB9	"Star" (이 별)	V34	Park Je-up	28 votes	Park Jin-young	"Swing Baby"	V26	Jo Hwan-ji	18 votes
Eagles	"Desperado"	V21	Hong Sung-won	21 votes	10cm	"Phonecert" (폰서트)	V27	Hong Seong-jun	votes
Paul Kim	"Me After You" (너를 만나)	V18	Kim Seo-hyung	16 votes	John Park	"Though of You" (네 생각)	V28	Taewoo	25 votes
Frankie Valli	"Can't Take My Eyes Off You"	V30	Jung Soo-min	25 votes	Ecobridge	"The First Day" (첫째 날)	V29	Hwang In-hyuk	22 votes
Jaurim	"Twenty-Five, Twenty-One" (스물다섯, 스물하나)	V4	Sunyoul	24 votes	BtoB	"Missing You" (그리워하다)	V31	Jang In-tae	5 votes
Wanna One	"Energetic"	V17	Choi Su-hwan	11 votes	Taeil	"Starlight"	V32	Jeong Yun-seo	13 votes
					Yoo Jae-ha	"My Reflection in My Mind" (내 마음에 비친 내 모습)	V35	Kwon Eui-bin	24 votes
					Adele	"Rolling in the Deep"	V39	Kim Min-seo	13 votes

== Pre-4 Mission (Episode 1–2) ==
For the Pre-4 Mission, each contestant chose a song and formed a 4-member group to perform a single stage. The ranking on Voice Check-in has a big impact for this mission and if the song has filled with four members, the lower placed contestant must choose another song. Although it is a group mission, the evaluation is individual, and the most voted team member by the judges becomes the top tier and has the right to select the lower tier from the team.

Color key

All votes

Pre-4 Mission results
Performance			Contestants	Result (Note: Starting episode 2, 5 votes was given instead of 6 due to the absence of judge Wendy.)			
#	Original artist(s)	Song	Contestants	Top Tier	Middle Tier		Low Tier
Episode 1
1	BigBang	"If You"	Kang Ha-yoon	Jay Chang (6 votes)	Kang Ha-yoon	Hong Seong-jun	Geonu
1	BigBang	"If You"	Jay Chang	Jay Chang (6 votes)	Kang Ha-yoon	Hong Seong-jun	Geonu
1	BigBang	"If You"	Hong Seong-jun	Jay Chang (6 votes)	Kang Ha-yoon	Hong Seong-jun	Geonu
1	BigBang	"If You"	Geonu	Jay Chang (6 votes)	Kang Ha-yoon	Hong Seong-jun	Geonu
2	Sung Si-kyung	"Every Moment of You" (너의 모든 순간)	Hong Sung-won	Seunghun (5 votes)	Bain	Jang In-tae	Hong Sung-won
2	Sung Si-kyung	"Every Moment of You" (너의 모든 순간)	Bain	Seunghun (5 votes)	Bain	Jang In-tae	Hong Sung-won
2	Sung Si-kyung	"Every Moment of You" (너의 모든 순간)	Seunghun	Seunghun (5 votes)	Bain	Jang In-tae	Hong Sung-won
2	Sung Si-kyung	"Every Moment of You" (너의 모든 순간)	Jang In-tae	Seunghun (5 votes)	Bain	Jang In-tae	Hong Sung-won
3	Brown Eyes	"Don't Go, Don't Go" (가지마 가지마)	Park Je-up	Lee Dong-hun (3 votes)	Neon	Park Je-up	Hyukjin
3	Brown Eyes	"Don't Go, Don't Go" (가지마 가지마)	Lee Dong-hun	Lee Dong-hun (3 votes)	Neon	Park Je-up	Hyukjin
3	Brown Eyes	"Don't Go, Don't Go" (가지마 가지마)	Neon	Lee Dong-hun (3 votes)	Neon	Park Je-up	Hyukjin
3	Brown Eyes	"Don't Go, Don't Go" (가지마 가지마)	Hyukjin	Lee Dong-hun (3 votes)	Neon	Park Je-up	Hyukjin
Episode 2
4	Kim Dong-ryul	"Saying I Love Again" (다시 사랑한다 말할까)	Kim Seong-jeong	Kim Seong-jeong (4 votes)	Yeo One	Yoon In-hwan	Kim Seo-hyung
4	Kim Dong-ryul	"Saying I Love Again" (다시 사랑한다 말할까)	Yeo One	Kim Seong-jeong (4 votes)	Yeo One	Yoon In-hwan	Kim Seo-hyung
4	Kim Dong-ryul	"Saying I Love Again" (다시 사랑한다 말할까)	Kim Seo-hyung	Kim Seong-jeong (4 votes)	Yeo One	Yoon In-hwan	Kim Seo-hyung
4	Kim Dong-ryul	"Saying I Love Again" (다시 사랑한다 말할까)	Yoon In-hwan	Kim Seong-jeong (4 votes)	Yeo One	Yoon In-hwan	Kim Seo-hyung
5	Hyukoh	"Tomboy"	Lee Gwang-seok	Park Ju-he (3 votes)	Hwang In-hyuk	Jo Hwan-ji	Lee Gwang-seok
5	Hyukoh	"Tomboy"	Hwang In-hyuk	Park Ju-he (3 votes)	Hwang In-hyuk	Jo Hwan-ji	Lee Gwang-seok
5	Hyukoh	"Tomboy"	Jo Hwan-ji	Park Ju-he (3 votes)	Hwang In-hyuk	Jo Hwan-ji	Lee Gwang-seok
5	Hyukoh	"Tomboy"	Park Ju-he	Park Ju-he (3 votes)	Hwang In-hyuk	Jo Hwan-ji	Lee Gwang-seok
6	Hwayobi	"Something Like That" (그런 일은)	Kwon Eui-bin	Lee Min-wook (3 votes)	Kwon Eui-bin	Taehwan	Ma Jae-kyung
6	Hwayobi	"Something Like That" (그런 일은)	Taehwan	Lee Min-wook (3 votes)	Kwon Eui-bin	Taehwan	Ma Jae-kyung
6	Hwayobi	"Something Like That" (그런 일은)	Ma Jae-kyung	Lee Min-wook (3 votes)	Kwon Eui-bin	Taehwan	Ma Jae-kyung
6	Hwayobi	"Something Like That" (그런 일은)	Lee Min-wook	Lee Min-wook (3 votes)	Kwon Eui-bin	Taehwan	Ma Jae-kyung
7	NewJeans	"Ditto"	Jung Soo-min	Wumuti (3 votes)	Jung Soo-min	Kang Seok-hwa	Jeon Woong
7	NewJeans	"Ditto"	Kang Seok-hwa	Wumuti (3 votes)	Jung Soo-min	Kang Seok-hwa	Jeon Woong
7	NewJeans	"Ditto"	Jeon Woong	Wumuti (3 votes)	Jung Soo-min	Kang Seok-hwa	Jeon Woong
7	NewJeans	"Ditto"	Wumuti	Wumuti (3 votes)	Jung Soo-min	Kang Seok-hwa	Jeon Woong
8	Park Hyo-shin	"Breath" (숨)	Jeong In-seong	Choi Ha-ram (5 votes)	Jeong In-seong	Lee Hwan-hee	Lim Jun-hyuk
8	Park Hyo-shin	"Breath" (숨)	Choi Ha-ram	Choi Ha-ram (5 votes)	Jeong In-seong	Lee Hwan-hee	Lim Jun-hyuk
8	Park Hyo-shin	"Breath" (숨)	Lee Hwan-hee	Choi Ha-ram (5 votes)	Jeong In-seong	Lee Hwan-hee	Lim Jun-hyuk
8	Park Hyo-shin	"Breath" (숨)	Lim Jun-hyuk	Choi Ha-ram (5 votes)	Jeong In-seong	Lee Hwan-hee	Lim Jun-hyuk
9	Mamamoo	"Décalcomanie" (데칼코마니)	Sunyoul	Choi Su-hwan (4 votes)	Bitsaeon	Sunyoul	Ji Yeon-woo
9	Mamamoo	"Décalcomanie" (데칼코마니)	Bitsaeon	Choi Su-hwan (4 votes)	Bitsaeon	Sunyoul	Ji Yeon-woo
9	Mamamoo	"Décalcomanie" (데칼코마니)	Ji Yeon-woo	Choi Su-hwan (4 votes)	Bitsaeon	Sunyoul	Ji Yeon-woo
9	Mamamoo	"Décalcomanie" (데칼코마니)	Choi Su-hwan	Choi Su-hwan (4 votes)	Bitsaeon	Sunyoul	Ji Yeon-woo
10	Crush	"Beautiful"	Lim Sang-hyun	Lim Sang-hyun (3 votes)	Jung Yun-seo	Taewoo	Kim Min-seo
10	Crush	"Beautiful"	Taewoo	Lim Sang-hyun (3 votes)	Jung Yun-seo	Taewoo	Kim Min-seo
10	Crush	"Beautiful"	Jung Yun-seo	Lim Sang-hyun (3 votes)	Jung Yun-seo	Taewoo	Kim Min-seo
10	Crush	"Beautiful"	Kim Min-seo	Lim Sang-hyun (3 votes)	Jung Yun-seo	Taewoo	Kim Min-seo

== 2 vs 2 Rival Mission (Episode 3–5) ==
In 2 vs 2 Rival Mission, contestants formed a duet and competed against another duet. The top tiers from Pre-4 Mission can partner with anyone in all sections (Top, Middle and Low), the same matching rule applies with middle tiers but only to sections M and L while low tiers can only team up in their respective section. Another rule is the low tier contestant cannot refuse the top tier contestant's offer to form a team and if picked by more than two then the contestant could choose his partner. The duet with a higher judge score wins and the losing team is a candidate for elimination.

Color key

Team won

2 vs 2 Rival Mission results
Performance			Contestants	Team name	Scores		
#	Original artist(s)	Song	Contestants	Team name	Highest	Lowest	Total
Episode 3
1	Shinee	"Sherlock (Clue + Note)" (셜록)	Choi Su-hwan	JeSu (제수)	96	88	645
1	Shinee	"Sherlock (Clue + Note)" (셜록)	Park Je-up	JeSu (제수)	96	88	645
1	Jonghyun	"End of a Day" (하루의 끝)	Lee Dong-hun	Hun Youl (훈율)	97	75	624
1	Jonghyun	"End of a Day" (하루의 끝)	Sunyoul	Hun Youl (훈율)	97	75	624
2	Crush	"Hmm-cheat" (흠칫)	Seunghun	723 (Note: 723 means July 23 where it is Neon's birthday and Seunghun's group debut.)	97	86	650
2	Crush	"Hmm-cheat" (흠칫)	Neon	723	97	86	650
2	Roy Kim	"Take Me Back in Time" (그때로 돌아가)	Yoon In-hwan	Balladream	100	90	666
2	Roy Kim	"Take Me Back in Time" (그때로 돌아가)	Ma Jae-kyung	Balladream	100	90	666
3	Charlie Puth	"Dangerously"	Jay Chang	Sweet and Salty (단짠단짠)	100	97	693
3	Charlie Puth	"Dangerously"	Bitsaeon	Sweet and Salty (단짠단짠)	100	97	693
3	Harry Styles	"Falling"	Wumuti	Golden Boys (골든 보이즈)	100	98	697
3	Harry Styles	"Falling"	Kang Ha-yoon	Golden Boys (골든 보이즈)	100	98	697
Episode 4
4	Ryeowook	"The Little Prince"	Jeong Yun-seo	Trainees (연습생즈)	92	70	591
4	Ryeowook	"The Little Prince"	Ji Yeon-woo	Trainees (연습생즈)	92	70	591
4	Blackpink	"Kick It"	Kang Seok-hwa	Destiny (인연)	80	60	505
4	Blackpink	"Kick It"	Jeon Woong	Destiny (인연)	80	60	505
5	Bumjin	"A Letter" (인사)	Kim Seong-jeong	Black and Black	90	75	587
5	Bumjin	"A Letter" (인사)	Lee Gwang-seok	Black and Black	90	75	587
5	Bishop Briggs	"River"	Bain	Black Fire	100	97	690
5	Bishop Briggs	"River"	Kim Min-seo	Black Fire	100	97	690
6	Urban Zakapa	"I Don't Love You" (널 사랑하지 않아)	Hong Seong-jun	I Don't Love You But I Love You	92	80	601
6	Urban Zakapa	"I Don't Love You" (널 사랑하지 않아)	Kim Seo-hyung	I Don't Love You But I Love You	92	80	601
6	Crush	"Don't Forget" (feat. Taeyeon) (잊어버리지마)	Jung Soo-min	Soou (수우우)	95	86	636
6	Crush	"Don't Forget" (feat. Taeyeon) (잊어버리지마)	Geonu	Soou (수우우)	95	86	636
Episode 5
7	Lucy	"Play"	Taehwan	Cheers (환호성)	87	75	578
7	Lucy	"Play"	Hong Sung-won	Cheers (환호성)	87	75	578
7	IU	"My Sea" (아이와 나의 바다)	Yeo One	Unknown	91	75	579
7	IU	"My Sea" (아이와 나의 바다)	Lim Jun-hyeok	Unknown	91	75	579
8	Bolbbalgan4	"To My Youth" (나의 사춘기에게)	Choi Ha-ram	Unknown	100	85	648
8	Bolbbalgan4	"To My Youth" (나의 사춘기에게)	Hwang In-hyuk	Unknown	100	85	648
8	The Stray	"Moon" (달)	Park Ju-he	Unknown	90	80	607
8	The Stray	"Moon" (달)	Kwon Eui-bin	Unknown	90	80	607
9	Lee Hong-gi and Yoo Hwe-seung	"Still Love You" (사랑했었다)	Jeong In-seong	Unknown	87	65	543
9	Lee Hong-gi and Yoo Hwe-seung	"Still Love You" (사랑했었다)	Hyukjin	Unknown	87	65	543
9	EXO	"Universe"	Lee Min-wook	Unknown	96	78	589
9	EXO	"Universe"	Jang In-tae	Unknown	96	78	589
10	Taeyeon	"Four Seasons" (사계)	Jo Hwan-ji	Unknown	79	69	515
10	Taeyeon	"Four Seasons" (사계)	Lee Hwan-hee	Unknown	79	69	515
10	I.O.I	"Downpour" (소나기)	Lim Sang-hyun	Unknown	100	85	641
10	I.O.I	"Downpour" (소나기)	Taewoo	Unknown	100	85	641

== Triple Death Match Mission (Episode 5–7) ==
Color key

Team won

Triple Death Match Mission results
Performance			Contestants	Team name	Score
#	Original artist(s)	Song	Contestants	Team name	Score
Episode 5
1	BtoB	"Pray (I'll Be Your Man)" (기도)	Choi Su-hwan	JeSuSeung (제수승)	4
1	BtoB	"Pray (I'll Be Your Man)" (기도)	Park Je-up	JeSuSeung (제수승)	4
1	BtoB	"Pray (I'll Be Your Man)" (기도)	Seunghun	JeSuSeung (제수승)	4
1	Kiss of Life	"Bad News"	Bain	Unknown	3
1	Kiss of Life	"Bad News"	Kim Min-seo	Unknown	3
1	Kiss of Life	"Bad News"	Bitsaeon	Unknown	3
Episode 6
2	Choi Yu-ree	"Forest" (숲)	Lim Sang-hyun	TaeNeSang (태네상)	1
2	Choi Yu-ree	"Forest" (숲)	Taewoo	TaeNeSang (태네상)	1
2	Choi Yu-ree	"Forest" (숲)	Neon	TaeNeSang (태네상)	1
2	Taeyeon	"Drawing Our Moments" (너를 그리는 시간)	Choi Ha-ram	Three Tofu (삼두부)	6
2	Taeyeon	"Drawing Our Moments" (너를 그리는 시간)	Hwang In-hyuk	Three Tofu (삼두부)	6
2	Taeyeon	"Drawing Our Moments" (너를 그리는 시간)	Sunyoul	Three Tofu (삼두부)	6
3	Big Naughty	"Joker" (feat. Jamie)	Jung Soo-min	Taco Trio (타코트리오)	6
3	Big Naughty	"Joker" (feat. Jamie)	Geonu	Taco Trio (타코트리오)	6
3	Big Naughty	"Joker" (feat. Jamie)	Kim Seo-hyung	Taco Trio (타코트리오)	6
3	AKMU	"Nakka" (with. IU) (낙하)	Jung Yun-seo	Young Musician (막동뮤지션)	1
3	AKMU	"Nakka" (with. IU) (낙하)	Ji Yeon-woo	Young Musician (막동뮤지션)	1
3	AKMU	"Nakka" (with. IU) (낙하)	Park Ju-he	Young Musician (막동뮤지션)	1
4	Park Jin-young	"Fever" (feat. Superbee, Bibi)	Wumuti	All Vitamin (총합 비타민)	4
4	Park Jin-young	"Fever" (feat. Superbee, Bibi)	Kang Ha-yoon	All Vitamin (총합 비타민)	4
4	Park Jin-young	"Fever" (feat. Superbee, Bibi)	Jay Chang	All Vitamin (총합 비타민)	4
4	Hoppipolla	"Enough" (그거면 돼요)	Lee Min-wook	Woong-iverse (웅이벌스)	3
4	Hoppipolla	"Enough" (그거면 돼요)	Jang In-tae	Woong-iverse (웅이벌스)	3
4	Hoppipolla	"Enough" (그거면 돼요)	Jeon Woong	Woong-iverse (웅이벌스)	3
Episode 7
5	Jung Seung-hwan	"An Ordinary Day" (보통의 하루)	Yeo One	My Gwang-seok (나의 광석씨)	4
5	Jung Seung-hwan	"An Ordinary Day" (보통의 하루)	Lim Jun-hyeok	My Gwang-seok (나의 광석씨)	4
5	Jung Seung-hwan	"An Ordinary Day" (보통의 하루)	Lee Gwang-seok	My Gwang-seok (나의 광석씨)	4
5	BTS	"The Truth Untold" (feat. Steve Aoki) (전하지 못한 진심)	Yoon In-hwan	Sofa (소파)	3
5	BTS	"The Truth Untold" (feat. Steve Aoki) (전하지 못한 진심)	Ma Jae-kyung	Sofa (소파)	3
5	BTS	"The Truth Untold" (feat. Steve Aoki) (전하지 못한 진심)	Lee Dong-hun	Sofa (소파)	3

== One Team Mission (Episode 8) ==
Color key

Team won

One Team Mission results
Performance			Contestants	Team name	Scores			
#	Original artist(s)	Song	Contestants	Team name	Judges' vote	On-site vote	Pre-online vote (Note: One Team Mission voting period: March 9, 2024 at 00:00 (KST) to March 11, 2024 at 12:00 (KST).)	Total
1	Woodz	"Drowning"	Jay Chang	HunMinJayBit (훈민제빛)	528	190	36	754
1	Woodz	"Drowning"	Bitsaeon	HunMinJayBit (훈민제빛)	528	190	36	754
1	Woodz	"Drowning"	Seunghun	HunMinJayBit (훈민제빛)	528	190	36	754
1	Woodz	"Drowning"	Kim Min-seo	HunMinJayBit (훈민제빛)	528	190	36	754
2	Taemin	"Guilty"	Park Je-up	The Partners (동업자들)	561	254	26	841
2	Taemin	"Guilty"	Lee Dong-hun	The Partners (동업자들)	561	254	26	841
2	Taemin	"Guilty"	Bain	The Partners (동업자들)	561	254	26	841
2	Taemin	"Guilty"	Jeon Woong	The Partners (동업자들)	561	254	26	841
3	Aespa	"Drama"	Sunyoul	WaterFire	549	147	19	715
3	Aespa	"Drama"	Choi Su-hwan	WaterFire	549	147	19	715
3	Aespa	"Drama"	Wumuti	WaterFire	549	147	19	715
3	Aespa	"Drama"	Kang Ha-yoon	WaterFire	549	147	19	715
4	Mark Ronson	"Uptown Funk" (feat. Bruno Mars)	Jung Soo-min	Milky-Up	568	300	9	877
4	Mark Ronson	"Uptown Funk" (feat. Bruno Mars)	Geonu	Milky-Up	568	300	9	877
4	Mark Ronson	"Uptown Funk" (feat. Bruno Mars)	Kim Seo-hyung	Milky-Up	568	300	9	877
4	Mark Ronson	"Uptown Funk" (feat. Bruno Mars)	Choi Ha-ram	Milky-Up	568	300	9	877
5	Park Hyo-shin	"Gift"	Lee Gwang-seok	DoReMiFa (도레미파)	538	93	10	641
5	Park Hyo-shin	"Gift"	Yeo One	DoReMiFa (도레미파)	538	93	10	641
5	Park Hyo-shin	"Gift"	Lim Jun-hyeok	DoReMiFa (도레미파)	538	93	10	641
5	Park Hyo-shin	"Gift"	Hwang In-hyuk	DoReMiFa (도레미파)	538	93	10	641

== Semifinal Mission (Episode 9) ==
Color key

Team won

Semifinal Mission results
Performance			Contestants	Team name	Scores			
#	Song	Production credit	Contestants	Team name	Judges' vote	On-site vote	Pre-online vote	Total
1	"Flower"	Lyrics & Composition: Primsfilter; Choreography: Monika, Heyjoo	Jay Chang	HunMinJayBit (훈민제빛)	583	300	100	983
1	"Flower"	Lyrics & Composition: Primsfilter; Choreography: Monika, Heyjoo	Bitsaeon	HunMinJayBit (훈민제빛)	583	300	100	983
1	"Flower"	Lyrics & Composition: Primsfilter; Choreography: Monika, Heyjoo	Seunghun	HunMinJayBit (훈민제빛)	583	300	100	983
1	"Flower"	Lyrics & Composition: Primsfilter; Choreography: Monika, Heyjoo	Kim Min-seo	HunMinJayBit (훈민제빛)	583	300	100	983
2	"Lose Yourself"	Lyrics & Composition: Primsfilter; Choreography: Choi Young-joon, Yoo Seung-hyun, Kim Jin-wook	Park Je-up	The Partners (동업자들)	544	262	39	845
2	"Lose Yourself"	Lyrics & Composition: Primsfilter; Choreography: Choi Young-joon, Yoo Seung-hyun, Kim Jin-wook	Lee Dong-hun	The Partners (동업자들)	544	262	39	845
2	"Lose Yourself"	Lyrics & Composition: Primsfilter; Choreography: Choi Young-joon, Yoo Seung-hyun, Kim Jin-wook	Bain	The Partners (동업자들)	544	262	39	845
2	"Lose Yourself"	Lyrics & Composition: Primsfilter; Choreography: Choi Young-joon, Yoo Seung-hyun, Kim Jin-wook	Jeon Woong	The Partners (동업자들)	544	262	39	845
3	"Someday" (어느 날)	Lyrics & Composition: 1601	Sunyoul	WaterFire	572	298	20	890
3	"Someday" (어느 날)	Lyrics & Composition: 1601	Choi Su-hwan	WaterFire	572	298	20	890
3	"Someday" (어느 날)	Lyrics & Composition: 1601	Wumuti	WaterFire	572	298	20	890
3	"Someday" (어느 날)	Lyrics & Composition: 1601	Kang Ha-yoon	WaterFire	572	298	20	890
4	"You&I"	Lyrics & Composition: Pdogg	Jung Soo-min	Milky-Up	550	221	10	781
4	"You&I"	Lyrics & Composition: Pdogg	Geonu	Milky-Up	550	221	10	781
4	"You&I"	Lyrics & Composition: Pdogg	Kim Seo-hyung	Milky-Up	550	221	10	781
4	"You&I"	Lyrics & Composition: Pdogg	Choi Ha-ram	Milky-Up	550	221	10	781

== Final Mission (Episode 10) ==
Color key

Team won

Final Mission results
Performance			Contestants	Team name	Scores		
#	Song	Production credit	Contestants	Team name	Pre-online Vote	Live Broadcast Vote	Total
1	"Now" (지금 이 순간)	Lyrics: Building Owner, Glenn, Kim Seung-jun, Ohway!; Composition: Glenn, Building Owner; Arrangement: Building Owner, Kim Seung-jun	Sunyoul	WaterFire	122	291	413
1	"Now" (지금 이 순간)	Lyrics: Building Owner, Glenn, Kim Seung-jun, Ohway!; Composition: Glenn, Building Owner; Arrangement: Building Owner, Kim Seung-jun	Choi Su-hwan	WaterFire	122	291	413
1	"Now" (지금 이 순간)	Lyrics: Building Owner, Glenn, Kim Seung-jun, Ohway!; Composition: Glenn, Building Owner; Arrangement: Building Owner, Kim Seung-jun	Wumuti	WaterFire	122	291	413
1	"Now" (지금 이 순간)	Lyrics: Building Owner, Glenn, Kim Seung-jun, Ohway!; Composition: Glenn, Building Owner; Arrangement: Building Owner, Kim Seung-jun	Kang Ha-yoon	WaterFire	122	291	413
2	"Your Season" (너의 계절)	Lyrics and Composition: Score (13), Megatone (13), Luke (MonoTree); Arrangement: Park Junghoon	Park Je-up	The Partners (동업자들)	407	762	1,169
2	"Your Season" (너의 계절)	Lyrics and Composition: Score (13), Megatone (13), Luke (MonoTree); Arrangement: Park Junghoon	Lee Dong-hun	The Partners (동업자들)	407	762	1,169
2	"Your Season" (너의 계절)	Lyrics and Composition: Score (13), Megatone (13), Luke (MonoTree); Arrangement: Park Junghoon	Bain	The Partners (동업자들)	407	762	1,169
2	"Your Season" (너의 계절)	Lyrics and Composition: Score (13), Megatone (13), Luke (MonoTree); Arrangement: Park Junghoon	Jeon Woong	The Partners (동업자들)	407	762	1,169
3	"Hug Me" (안아줘)	Lyrics and Composition: Park Woo-sang (Logos), Seo9 (Logos), Lee Ji-yeon (Kissmejoy); Arrangement: Park Woo-sang (logos)	Jay Chang	HunMinJayBit (훈민제빛)	471	947	1,418
3	"Hug Me" (안아줘)	Lyrics and Composition: Park Woo-sang (Logos), Seo9 (Logos), Lee Ji-yeon (Kissmejoy); Arrangement: Park Woo-sang (logos)	Bitsaeon	HunMinJayBit (훈민제빛)	471	947	1,418
3	"Hug Me" (안아줘)	Lyrics and Composition: Park Woo-sang (Logos), Seo9 (Logos), Lee Ji-yeon (Kissmejoy); Arrangement: Park Woo-sang (logos)	Seunghun	HunMinJayBit (훈민제빛)	471	947	1,418
3	"Hug Me" (안아줘)	Lyrics and Composition: Park Woo-sang (Logos), Seo9 (Logos), Lee Ji-yeon (Kissmejoy); Arrangement: Park Woo-sang (logos)	Kim Min-seo	HunMinJayBit (훈민제빛)	471	947	1,418
