= Jewelry discography =

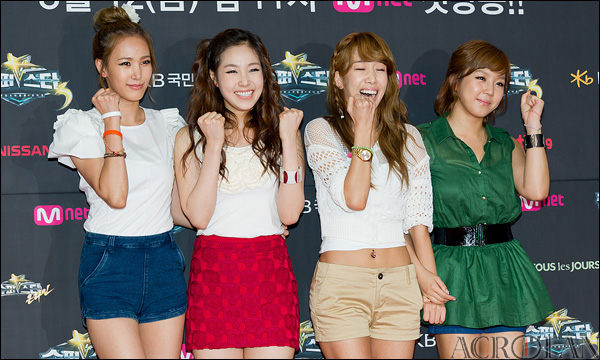
- Studio albums: 8
- EPs: 1
- Singles: 26
- Soundtrack appearances: 2

The discography of South Korean girl group Jewelry consists of eight studio albums, one extended play, twenty-six singles, and two soundtrack appearances. Formed in 2001, the group debuted with the single "I Love You", and had gone through numerous line-up changes before disbanding in January 2015.

== Albums ==
=== Studio albums ===
Title	Album details	Peak chart positions			Sales
Title	Album details	KOR RIAK (Note: The Recording Industry Association of Korea chart was discontinued in mid-2008.)	KOR Gaon (Note: The Gaon Music Chart was established in 2010.)	JPN	Sales
Korean
Discovery	Released: March 30, 2001; Label: Star Empire Entertainment; Format: CD, cassette, digital download	—	—	—	
Again	Released: July 31, 2002; Label: Star Empire Entertainment; Format: CD, cassette, digital download	12	—	—	KOR: 39,164
Beloved	Released: July 5, 2003; Label: Star Empire Entertainment; Format: CD, cassette, digital download	9	—	—	KOR: 36,859
Super Star	Released: March 15, 2005; Label: Star Empire Entertainment; Format: CD, cassette, digital download	9	—	—	KOR: 32,194
Kitchi Island	Released: February 20, 2008; Label: Star Empire Entertainment; Format: CD, digital download	8	22	—	KOR: 23,703
Sophisticated	Released: August 27, 2009; End And...: December 17, 2009; Label: Star Empire Entertainment; Format: CD, digital download	—	55	—	
Japanese
Jewelry First	Released: March 9, 2005; Label: Giza Studio; Format: CD, digital download	—	—	73	JPN: 4,391
Super Star	Released: July 27, 2005; Label: Giza Studio; Format: CD, digital download	—	—	152	JPN: 1,521
"—" denotes releases that did not chart.

== Extended plays ==
Title	Details	Peak chart positions	Sales
Title	Details	KOR	Sales
Look at Me	Released: October 11, 2012; Label: Star Empire Entertainment; Format: CD, digital download	7	KOR: 2,028

== Singles ==
Title	Year	Peak chart positions			Album
Title	Year	KOR	KOR Hot	JPN	Album
Korean
"I Love You"	2001	—	—	—	Discovery
"Again"	2002	—	—	—	Again
"I Really Like You"	2003	—	—	—	Beloved
"Be My Love"	2003	—	—	—	Beloved
"Super Star"	2005	—	—	—	Super Star
"Passion"	2005	—	—	—	Super Star
"One More Time"	2008	1	—	—	Kitchi Island
"Everybody Shh..."	2008	—	—	—	Kitchi Island 2 (single)
"Date" (as Jewelry S)	2009	—	—	—	Sweet Song (single)
"Super Star"	2009	—	—	—	Non-album single
"Vari2ty"	2009	—	—	—	Sophisticated
"Love Story"	2009	8	—	—	Sophisticated
"Back It Up"	2011	17	—	—	Non-album single
"Pass"	2011	31	—	—	Non-album single
"Forget It" (as Jewelry S)	2011	44	53	—	Ames Room Vol.2 (single)
"Shooting Star" (with Park Jung-ah, Seo In-young, ZE:A, Nine Muses)	2011	66	—	—	Non-album single
"Step"	2011	66	55	—	Dream Come True (single)
"Look at Me"	2012	23	25	—	Look at Me
"Hot & Cold"	2013	18	15	—	Non-album single
Japanese
"Kokoro ga Tomaranai"	2004	—	—	40	Jewelry First
"Mune Ippai no Kono Ai wo Dareyori Kimi ni"	2004	—	—	35	Jewelry First
"Delight Sweet Life"	2004	—	—	49	Jewelry First
"Shiro no Fantasy"	2005	—	—	69	Jewelry First
"Super Star"	2005	—	—	113	Super Star
"—" denotes releases that did not chart or were not released in that region. Note: Gaon Chart was established in 2010. Releases before this year have no chart data.

== Soundtrack appearances ==
Title	Year	Peak chart positions	Album
Title	Year	KOR	Album
"By Your Side"	2001	—	My Boss, My Hero OST
"Love Destiny"	2012	161	Standby OST Part.1

== Music videos ==
List of music videos, showing year released and director
Title	Year	Director(s)	Ref.
Korean
"I Love You"	2001	Unknown	
"Again"	2002	Unknown	
"I Really Like You"	2003	Unknown	
"Super Star"	2005	Unknown	
"Passion"	2005	Unknown	
"One More Time"	2008	Unknown	
"Everybody Shh.."	2008	Unknown	
"Date" (Jewelry S)	2009	Unknown	
"Vari2ty"	2009	Unknown	
"Love Story"	2009	Unknown	
"Back It Up"	2011	Lee Gi-baek	
"Forget It" (Jewelry S)	2011	Lee Gi-baek	
"Shooting Star"	2011	Unknown	
"Look at Me"	2012	Lee Gi-baek	
"Hot and Cold"	2013	Lee Gi-baek	
Japanese
"Kokoro ga Tomaranai"	2004	Unknown	
"Mune Ippai no Kono Ai wo Dareyori Kimi ni"	2004	Unknown	
"Delight Sweet Life"	2004	Unknown	
