= Park Je-up =

South Korean singer (born 1993)

- Born: Park Je-up; March 27, 1993 (age 33); Bucheon, Gyeonggi Province, South Korea
- Other name: Seoul (2022–2023)
- Occupation: Singer
- Musical career
- Genres: Ballad; R&B
- Instrument: Vocals
- Years active: 2016–present
- Labels: KH Company; Sony Music; Epic Records (2022–present); Star Empire (2016–2022)
- Member of: Imfact (2016–present)

Korean name
- Hangul: 박제업
- Hanja: 朴第業
- RR: Bak Jeeop
- MR: Pak Cheŏp

Park Je-up (Korean: 박제업; born March 27, 1993), known mononymously as Jeup, is a South Korean singer. He is the main vocalist of South Korean boy group Imfact. He is active as a solo artist and released his first extended play My Everything in 2024 under the KH Company, the label through which he made his solo debut with the digital single "Daystar" in 2022.

== Career ==
=== 2016–2022: Debut with Imfact, I Can See Your Voice, and The Unit ===
Jeup debuted as the main vocalist of five-member boy group Imfact (Korean: 임팩트) under the now defunct Star Empire Entertainment on January 27, 2016.

In March 2017, Jeup made a guest appearance as a mystery singer on the first episode of the fourth season of I Can See Your Voice.

Starting from late 2017 and continuing into early 2018, Jeup appeared as a contestant on KBS' survival reality show, Idol Rebooting Project: The Unit, with Imfact group members Taeho, Ungjae, and Jian. Jeup was eliminated in the fifteenth episode, placing eleventh in the competition.

=== 2022–2023: Departure from Star Empire Entertainment, solo debut with KH Company, and Sing Again 3 ===
Star Empire made an announcement on January 4, 2022, stating that the members of Imfact, including Jeup, collectively settled upon the decision to not renew their contracts with the company. No official statement has been released regarding the status of Imfact as a group. Therefore, Jeup's position as a member remains unchanged as of September 2024.

In April 2022, Jeup signed with KH Company as a soloist under the stage name of Seoul. He released his debut digital single "Daystar" the same year on October 3. He shared that the track was offered to him by Choi Hyun-joon, a member of V.O.S, an R&B boy group that had previously been active under Star Empire. Following his debut, Jeup released an additional three digital singles: "Dear Snow," "Can't Leave," and "One Man."

On January 25, 2023, Jeup notified fans of his decision to change his stage name from Seoul to his birth name, Park Je-up. This change was prompted by challenges in discoverability because of the association with South Korea's capital. Jeup subsequently released digital single "Day by Day" in collaboration with singer U Sung-eun on February 25.

In late 2023, Jeup appeared as a contestant in the third season of JTBC's reality television show Sing Again. He was eliminated in the fourth episode, having passed the first round but not the second.

=== 2024–present: Build Up, My Everything, and the debut of D&J ===
On January 21, Mnet announced the contestants for their new reality competition, Build Up: Vocal Boy Group Survival. Jeup was part of this line-up and placed in the "Power" category. In the finals, he was eliminated and secured second place with his team, The Partners.

On May 1, KH Company announced the release of his first extended play, titled My Everything. On May 18, the day of its release, Jeup hosted his first two fan concerts at Ilchi Art Hall.

On June 12, KH Company announced that Jeup's seventh digital single, "Time We Loved", will be released on the 25th.

In a joint statement delivered on July 7, KH Company and Beat Interactive announced that Jeup and Lee Dong-hun, the main vocalist of A.C.E and Jeup's teammate on Build Up, will debut as a duo named D&J. On July 13, they released their debut digital single titled "I Still".

On October 11, KH Company announced the upcoming release of Jeup's second extended play, titled Mellifluous. It is scheduled to be released in November.

== Personal life ==
=== Military service ===
On July 13, 2020, Star Empire posted an announcement stating that Jeup would fulfill his mandatory military service starting on July 27 as an active duty soldier. Due to the COVID-19 pandemic, he was discharged early on January 26, 2022.

== Discography ==
=== Extended plays ===
List of extended plays, showing selected details, selected chart positions, and sales figures
Title	Details	Peak chart positions	Sales
Title	Details	KOR	Sales
My Everything	Released: May 18, 2024; Label: KH Company, Sony Music, Epic Records; Formats: CD, digital download, streaming; Track listing: 1. "My Everything"; 2. "We Will Be Memories" (Prod. Lee Woo); 3. "Hesitate" (Prod. Hello Gloom); 4. "My Everything (Inst.)"	71	KOR: 1,313
Mellifluous	Released: November 29, 2024; Label: KH Company, Sony Music, Epic Records; Formats: CD, digital download, streaming; Track listing: 1. "Destiny"; 2. "Reset"; 3. "Because of you" 4. "나의 밤"; 5. "Destiny (Acoustic ver.)" 6. "Destiny (Inst.)"	—N/a	—N/a
Archive	Released: July 25, 2025; Label: KH Company, Sony Music, Epic Records; Formats: CD, digital download, streaming; Track listing: 1. "Movie"; 2. "홀로서기"; 3. "봄 그리고 너"; 4. "너의 밤"; 5. "You"; 6. "Movie (Inst.)"	34	KOR: 4,104

=== Singles ===
List of singles, showing year released, and name of the album
Title	Year	Album
"Daystar" (낮의 별)	2022	Non-album singles
"Dear Snow" (첫눈은 설레이는 마음을 담아)	2022	Non-album singles
"Can't Leave" (다시 너를 만나봤자)	2023	Non-album singles
"One Man" (한 남자)	2023	Non-album singles
"My Everything"	2024	My Everything
"Time We Loved" (우리가 사랑했던 시간)	2024	Non-album single
"Destiny"	2024	Mellifluous
"Movie"	2025	Archive
"사랑인거죠"	2026	Non-album single

=== Collaborations ===
List of collaborations, showing selected details, chart positions, and sales figures
Title	Year	Album
"Day by Day" (with U Sung-eun)	2023	Non-album singles
"Love on Christmas" (크리스마스에 고백) (with Choi Nakta, Kim Do-hee, Kim Hankyul, Lee Woo)	2023	Non-album singles
"Can We Love Without Going Crazy?" (미치지 않고 사랑할 수 있을까) (with Kim Do-hee)	2024	Non-album singles

=== Songwriting credits ===
All credits are adapted from the Korea Music Copyright Association unless stated otherwise.

Year	Artist	Song	Album	Lyricist		Composition		Arranger		Ref
Year	Artist	Song	Album	Credited	With	Credited	With	Credited	With	Ref
2016	IMFACT	"I'M FACT"	Lollipop	Yes	Lee Sang, Lee Ji-an, Na Ung-jae, (Note: Also known as Hello Gloom, the stage name he adopted upon debuting as a solo singer-songwriter.) Kim Tae-ho	Yes	Lee Sang, Lee Ji-an, Na Ung-jae, Kim Tae-ho	Yes	Lee Sang, Lee Ji-an, Na Ung-jae, Kim Tae-ho	
2024	Himself	"Hesitate"	My Everything	Yes	HELLO GLOOM	No	—N/a	No	—N/a	
2024	Himself	"We will be memories"	My Everything	Yes	Lee Woo, Shin Young-min	No	—N/a	No	—N/a	

== Filmography ==
=== Television shows ===
Year	Title	Role	Notes	Ref.
2017	I Can See Your Voice	Mystery singer	Episode 1	
2017	Idol Rebooting Project: The Unit	Contestant	Episodes 1–15	
2023	Sing Again 3	Contestant	Episodes 1–4	
2024	Build Up: Vocal Boy Group Survival	Contestant	Episodes 1–10	
