= Park Gyeong-ree =

South Korean singer and actress (born 1990)

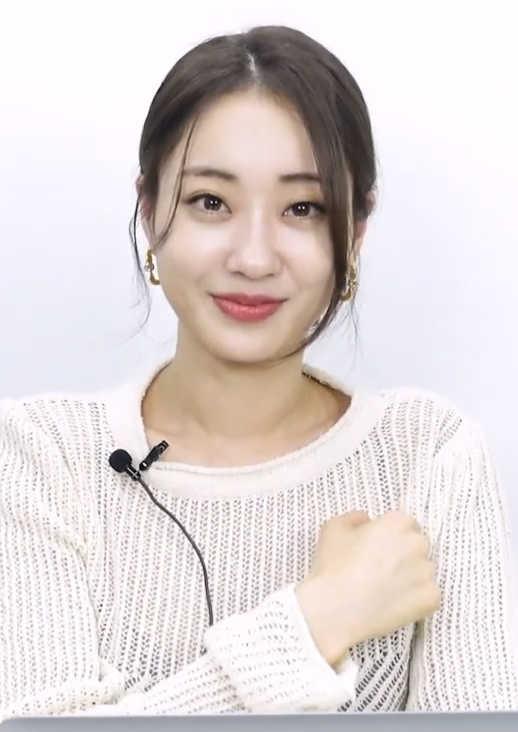
- Park in June 2021
- Born: July 5, 1990 (age 36); Bansong-dong, Haeundae District, Busan, South Korea
- Occupations: Singer; actress
- Agent: LabelSayu
- Musical career
- Genre: K-pop
- Instrument: Vocals
- Years active: 2006–present
- Labels: LabelSayu; Star Empire
- Member of: Nine Muses
- Formerly of: Nine Muses A; Nasty Nasty

Korean name
- Hangul: 박경리
- Hanja: 朴倞利
- RR: Bak Gyeongri
- MR: Pak Kyŏngni

Park Gyeong-ree (Korean: 박경리; born July 5, 1990), better known mononymously as Gyeongree (Korean: 경리; sometimes romanised as Kyungri), is a South Korean singer and actress. She was a member of the South Korean girl group Nine Muses.

== Early life and education ==
Park was born on July 5, 1990, in Bansong-dong, Haeundae District, Busan, South Korea. She completed her studies at Daemyung Girls High School. She signed with Star Empire Entertainment in 2007 and began as a trainee for Nine Muses, although she did not end up debuting along with that group.

== Career ==
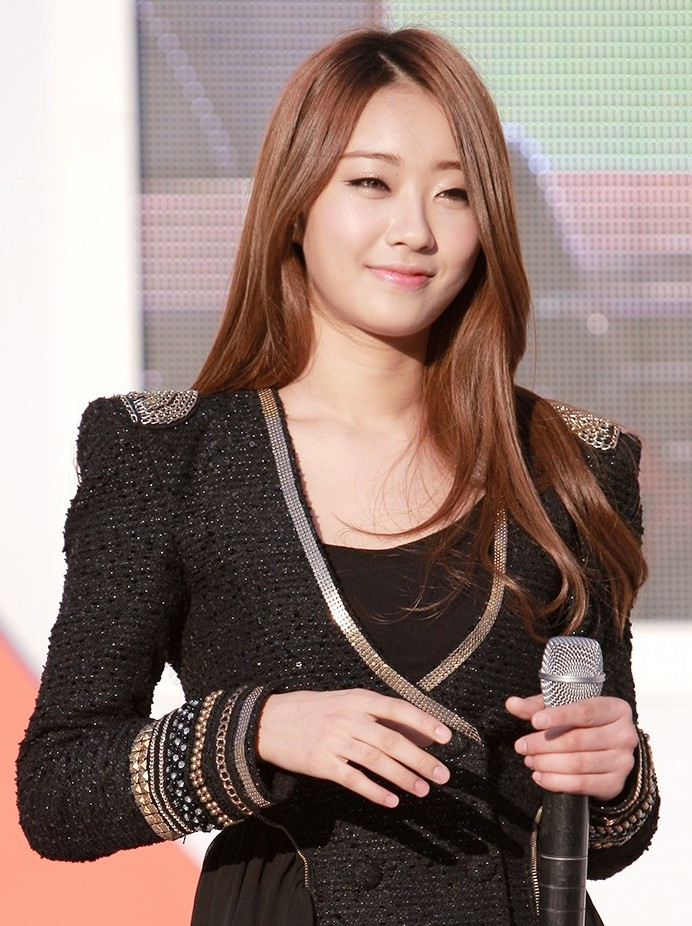
Park in 2012

In 2008, Park moved to Medialine Entertainment. She worked as back-up dancer for singers such as Kim Gun-mo, Park Mi-kyung and Chae Yeon while preparing for a debut with Viva Girls. But when that project was abandoned in 2011, she returned to Star Empire and became a member of Nine Muses in 2012.

She also took interest in acting and did supporting roles in dramas Reply 1994, On the Way to the Airport and Real. Following Nine Muses' disbandment in 2019, she renewed her contract with Star Empire Entertainment and decided to pursue a solo career. However, as of July 31, 2019, Star Empire Entertainment announced that Gyeongree had decided not to renew her contract with Star Empire, thus leaving the company after seven years.

She moved to YNK Entertainment on January 6, 2020, and announced that she would be concentrating on acting with the change of her stage name to her full name on July 30, 2020.

She returned to singing after joining LabelSayu on April 11, 2024.

== Discography ==
=== Singles ===
Title	Year	Peak chart positions	Album
Title	Year	KOR DL	Album
"Talk About You"	2017	—	Non-album single
"Blue Moon" (어젯밤)	2018	95	Blue Moon
"But I Miss You"	2021	—	Non-album single
"Cherry"	2024	66	Eternal Bloom
"—" denotes releases that did not chart or were not released in that region.

=== Collaborations ===
Title	Year	Peak chart positions	Album
Title	Year	KOR	Album
"White Christmas" (with Jeong Jin-woon)	2017	—	4love 1st
"BomBom" (봄봄) (with Nakta Choi)	2018	—	4love 2nd
"What're You Doing Tonight?" (오늘 밤 뭐해?) (with It's)	2018	—	Non-album single
"—" denotes releases that did not chart or were not released in that region.

== Filmography ==
=== Film ===
Year	Title	Role	Notes	Ref.
2015	2015 Dream Concert	Herself	Concert film	
2017	Real	Restaurant Waitress	Cameo	

=== Television series ===
Year	Title	Role	Notes	Ref.
2013	Blue Tower	Ji-sung	Cameo	
2013	Reply 1994	Na-jung's friend		
2016	Oh My God! Tip Series 3	Herself		
2016	On the Way to the Airport	Kim-yeong		
2016	I'm Not A Girl Anymore	Na So-nyuh		
2017	Borg Mom	Entrapment / femme fatale		
2021	Undercover	Go Yoon-joo (young)		
2022	The Forbidden Marriage	Cho-ran	Cameo (episode 1)	
2023	Cold Blooded Intern	Park Seung-ju		
2023	Strong Girl Nam-soon	Noh Son-saeng		

=== Hosting ===
Year	Title	Role	Ref.
2014	9Muses Cast	Main Host	
2018	Coming Soon	Main Host	
2021	Beauty and Luxury Season 6	Main Host	
2022	I'm SOLO: Love Continues	regular host	
2024	Selling Life	regular host	

=== Music video appearances ===
Year	Artist	Title	Ref.
2010	Chae Yeon	"Look Look Look"	
2013	Homme	"It Girl"	
2016	The Legend	"Crush on you"	
2016	Unnies	"Shut Up"	

== Awards and nominations ==
Name of the award ceremony, year presented, category, nominee of the award, and the result of the nomination
Award ceremony	Year	Category	Nominee / Work	Result	Ref.
MBC Entertainment Awards	2018	Music and Talk category	Park Gyeong-ree	Nominated	
MBC Entertainment Awards	2019	Women's Excellence Prize in Music Talk	Park Gyeong-ree	Nominated	
