= Lee Ji-hyun =

Lee Ji-hyun, Lee Ji-hyeon or Ri Ji-hyon (이지현) is a Korean name; the surname is Lee and the given name is Ji-hyun. It is the name of:

- Ji-Hyun Lee (statistician), American biostatistician
- Lee Ji-hyun (actress, born 1972), South Korean actress
- Lee Ji-hyun (actress, born 1983), South Korean actress and singer
- Lee Ji-hyun (swimmer, born 1978), South Korean swimmer
- Lee Jie-hyun (born 1979), South Korean swimmer
- Lee Ji-hyun (swimmer, born 1982), South Korean swimmer
- Qri (born 1986), or Lee Ji-hyun, South Korean singer and actress
