= Elly Is So Hot =

- Standard cover

Studio album by Seo In-young
- Released: February 26, 2007
- Recorded: 2006–2007
- Venue: Seoul, South Korea
- Studio: Star Empire Studios
- Genre: K-pop
- Length: 47:58
- Label: Star Empire Entertainment; CJ Music

Elly Is So Hot is Seo In-young's debut studio album. It was released on February 26, 2007. The first single from the album, 너를 원해 (I Want You), debuted at #17 on the Soompi chart in March 2007.

== Track listing ==
1. Intro
2. Hit
3. 너를 원해 (I Want You)
4. 가르쳐줘요 (Teach Me)
5. Blue Song
6. 6th Sense
7. Something
8. UR My Style
9. Seaes Hotel
10. Just Tonight (너를 원해, Lo-Fi House Remix) (Just Tonight (I Want you, Lo-Fi House Remix))
11. Hit (Hi-Voltage Remix)
12. 가르쳐줘요 (MR) (Teach Me (MR))
