= Lollipop (single album) =

Single by Imfact
- B-side: "I'M Fact"; "Shine"; "Trouble Maker"
- Released: January 27, 2016
- Recorded: 2015–2016
- Length: 10:58
- Label: Star Empire Entertainment; KT Music

Lollipop is the debut single album recorded by South Korean boy band Imfact. The single album was released as a digital download on January 27, 2016, by Star Empire Entertainment and distributed by KT Music, and as a physical album on January 28, 2016.

== Commercial performance ==
Lollipop entered at number 6 on the Gaon Album Chart on the chart issue dated January 24–30, 2016. On the monthly edition of the same chart, the album appeared at number 30 with 2,270 physical copies sold for the month of January.

== Track listing ==
Credits taken from Melon
No.	Title	Lyrics	Music	Arrangement	Length
1.	"I'M Fact"	Imfact	Imfact	Imfact	0:49
2.	"Lollipop" (롤리팝)	Ungjae	Ungjae	Ungjae; Jung Chang-wook	3:20
3.	"Shine" (샤인)	Jung Chang-wook; Lee Ji-an; Ungjae	Jung Chang-wook	Jung Chang-wook	3:17
4.	"Trouble Maker" (양아치)	Ungjae; Leesang; Lee Ji-an	Ungjae; Leesang	Ungjae; Leesang	3:29
Total length:					10:58

== Charts ==
=== Weekly charts ===
Chart (2016)	Peak position
South Korea (Gaon Album Chart)	6
South Korea (Gaon Month Album Chart)	30

=== Sales ===
Chart	Sales
Gaon physical sales	5,147+(South Korea)

== Release history ==
Region	Date	Format	Label
South Korea	January 27, 2016	Digital download	Star Empire Entertainment; KT Music
South Korea	January 28, 2016	CD	Star Empire Entertainment; KT Music
