= Nine Muses A =

South Korean girl group

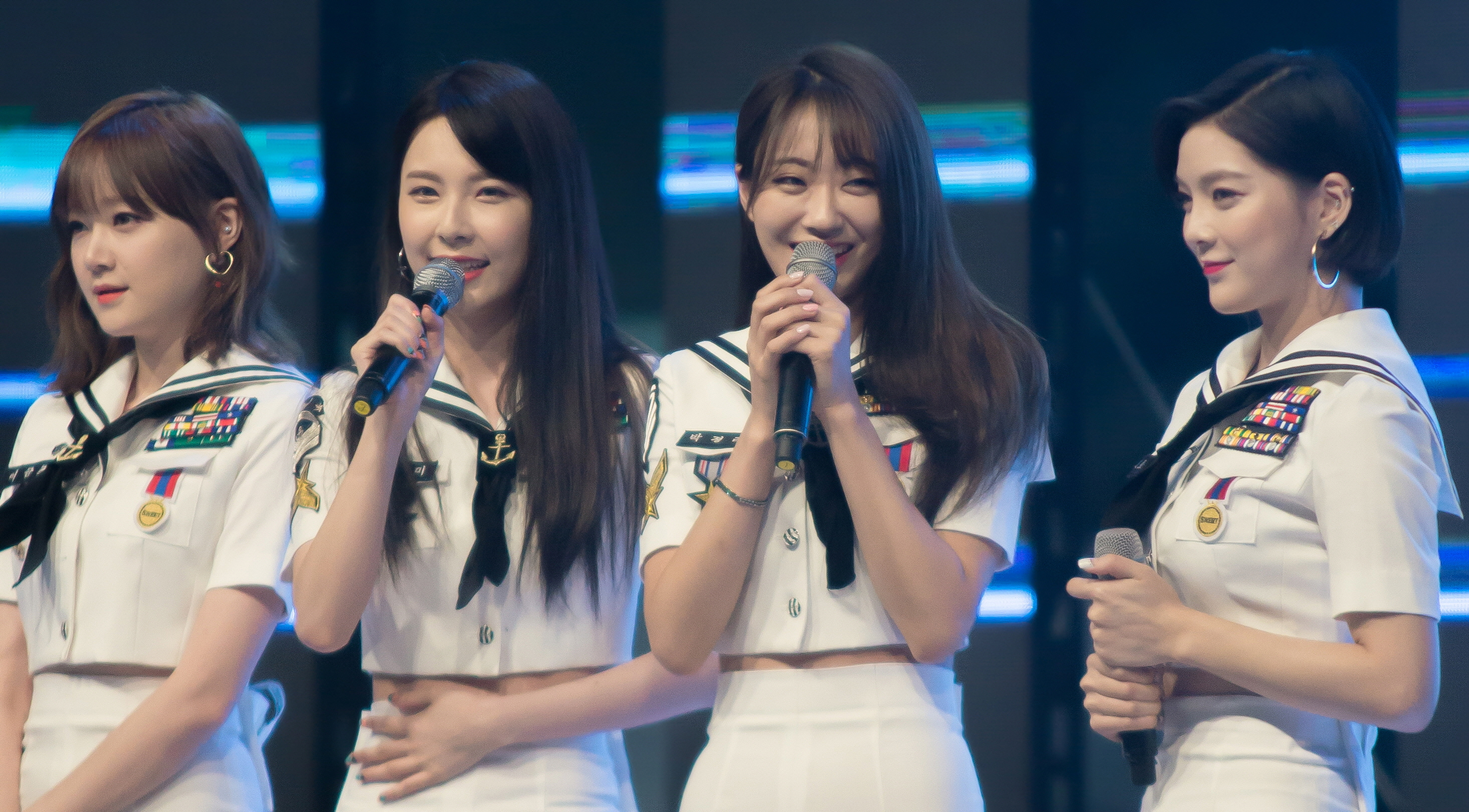
- Nine Muses A in 2016; L–R: Keumjo, Hyemi, Gyeongree, and Sojin

Background information
- Also known as: 9Muses A; 9Muses Amuse
- Origin: Seoul, South Korea
- Genres: K-pop
- Years active: 2016–2017
- Labels: Star Empire
- Spinoff of: Nine Muses
- Members: Gyeongree; Hyemi; Sojin; Keumjo

Nine Muses A (Korean: 나인뮤지스A, stylized in all caps or 9MUSES AMUSE) was the first sub-group of South Korean girl group Nine Muses formed by Star Empire Entertainment in 2016. It is composed of four Nine Muses members: Gyeongree, Hyemi, Sojin and Keumjo. The group released their debut single album Muses Diary on August 4, 2016.

== History ==
=== 2016: Debut with Muses Diary ===
After the departure of members Minha and Euaerin from Nine Muses in June 2016, Star Empire announced that the group would be making a summer comeback with a unit promotion with no further details. In early July, it was officially announced that the sub-unit would consist of four members, revealing member Gyeongree as the first official member of the sub-unit. The sub-unit debuted in early August. On July 21, it was revealed that the full line-up for the sub-group consisted of members Gyeongree (Center), Hyemi (Leader), Sojin (Rapper) and Keumjo (Main Vocal), also revealing that the song "Lip 2 Lip" would be their debut song. Nine Muses A is a shortened name for Nine Muses Amuse, meaning that the group will always make others happy and let them have a great time with their performance.

Nine Muses A released their debut single album Muses Diary on August 4, 2016.

=== 2023: Return ===
On March 21, 2023, it was announced that Nine Muses A would be releasing a song in May, followed by a full group comeback sometime in July or August, though the line-up for the full group comeback has yet to be confirmed.

== Discography ==
=== Single albums ===
Title	Album Details	Peak chart Positions	Sales
Title	Album Details	KOR	Sales
Muses Diary	Released: August 4, 2016; Label: Star Empire Entertainment, KT Music; Format: CD, Digital download	4	KOR: 10,504+

=== Singles ===
Title	Year	Peak chart positions	Sales	Album
Title	Year	KOR	Sales	Album
"Lip 2 Lip" (입술에 입술)	2016	48	KOR: 95,854	Muses Diary

== Tours ==
- Star Empire Family Concert (2016)
