= Muses Diary =

Single by Nine Muses A
- A-side: "Lip 2 Lip"
- B-side: "Shh!"; "Monster"
- Released: August 4, 2016
- Length: 13:33
- Label: Star Empire Entertainment; KT Music

Music video
- "Lip 2 Lip" on YouTube

Muses Diary is the debut single album recorded by South Korean girl group Nine Muses A, a sub-group from girl group Nine Muses. The single album was released as a digital download on August 4, 2016, by Star Empire Entertainment and distributed by KT Music, and as a physical album on August 8. The title track is "Lip 2 Lip" and was written and composed by Jung Changwook. The single has two B-sides, "Shh!" and "Monster".

== Background ==
On July 20, 2016 Star Empire announced through a video teaser the upcoming debut of Nine Muse's first four-member unit group called Nine Muses' A, setting the release for August 4 at noon KST with no specific details. On July 21 it was revealed that the title track will be called "Lip 2 Lip" and members Kyungri, Hyemi, Sojin and Keumjo will be part of the group. On July 25 it was revealed that the single album would be called Muses Diary, releasing the full track list for a total of four songs. From July 26 to July 28, teasers images of the full group were released online, along with short clips of each member. On July 29, an audio teaser of the single was posted online, revealing the songs for the first time. On August 1, the first music video teaser for "Lip 2 Lip" was released.

Muses Diary was released as a digital download on August 4, 2016 through several music portals.

== Commercial performance ==
Muses Diary entered at number 4 on the Gaon Album Chart on the chart issue dated July 31 - August 6, 2016. In its second week, charted at number 10 and in its third week at number 12. In its fourth week, the single album fell from the Top 20, charting at number 21.

The title track "Lip 2 Lip" entered at number 52 on the Gaon Digital Chart on the chart issue dated July 31 - August 6, 2016 with 37,849 downloads sold.

== Track listing ==
Digital download

No.	Title	Lyrics	Music	Arrangement	Length
1.	"Your Space"	Jung Changwook	Jung Changwook	Jung Changwook	0:45
2.	"Lip 2 Lip" (입술에 입술: ibsul-e ibsul)	Jung Changwook	Jung Changwook	Jung Changwook	3:02
3.	"Shh!" (쉿!: swis!)	e.one	e.one	e.one	3:09
4.	"Monster"	Urban Jeonseung; Son Hyesung	Urban Jeonseung	Urban Jeonseung	3:35
5.	"Lip 2 Lip" (Instrumental)				3:02
Total length:					13:33

== Charts ==
=== Weekly charts ===
Chart (2016)	Peak position
South Korea (Gaon Album Chart)	4

=== Sales ===
Chart	Sales
Gaon physical sales	10,504+(South Korea)

== Release history ==
Region	Date	Format	Label
South Korea	August 4, 2016	Digital download	Star Empire Entertainment; KT Music
South Korea	August 8, 2016	CD	Star Empire Entertainment; KT Music
