= Ji-hyun =

- Hangul: 지현
- RR: Jihyeon
- MR: Chihyŏn
- IPA: [tɕiçʌn]

Ji-hyun, also spelled Ji-hyeon, or Jee-hyun, is a Korean given name. Ji-hyun was the ninth-most popular name for baby girls in South Korea in 1990.

== People ==
People with this name include:

=== Actors and actresses ===
- Jung Jae-young (born Jung Ji-hyun, 1970), South Korean actor
- Jun Ji-hyun (born 1981), South Korean actress and model
- Lee El (born Kim Ji-hyun, 1982), South Korean actress
- Min Ji-hyun (born 1984), South Korean actress
- Ahn Ji-hyun (born 1992), South Korean actress
- Nam Ji-hyun (born 1995), South Korean actress
- Han Ji-hyun (born 1996), South Korean actress

=== Singers ===
- Kim Ji-hyun (singer) (born 1972), South Korean singer
- Lee Ji-hyun (actress) (born 1983), South Korean singer
- Qri (born Lee Ji-hyun, 1986), South Korean singer and actress, member of girl group T-ara
- G.Soul (born Kim Ji-hyun, 1988), American singer
- Son Ji-hyun (born 1990), South Korean singer and actress
- Soyou (born Kang Ji-hyun, 1992), South Korean singer and actress

=== Sportspeople ===
- Song Ji-hyun (born 1969), South Korean handball player
- Kim Ji-hyun (badminton) (born 1974), South Korean badminton player
- Lee Ji-hyun (swimmer, born 1978), South Korean swimmer
- Lee Ji-hyun (swimmer, born 1982), South Korean swimmer
- Jung Ji-hyun (born 1983), South Korean wrestler
- Kim Ji-heun (born 1989), South Korean swimmer
- Sung Ji-hyun (born 1991), South Korean badminton player
- Choi Ji-hyun (born 1994), South Korean short track speed skater
- Kim Ji-hyon (born 1995), South Korean freestyle skier
- Byun Ji-hyun (born 1999), South Korean figure skater

=== Other ===
- Jee Hyun Kim (fl. 2004–present), Australian neuroscientist
- Jihyun Yun, American author and poet

== Fictional characters ==
Fictional characters with this name include:

- Kim Ji-hyun, in 2008 South Korean television series East of Eden
- Kim Jihyun, in 2016 South Korean otome visual novel game Mystic Messenger

== See also ==
- List of Korean given names
