= Jewelry (group) =

South Korean girl group

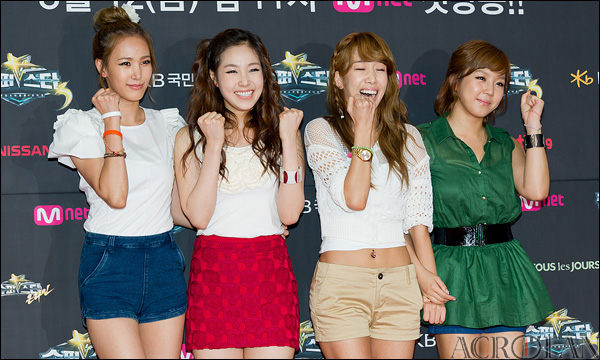
- Jewelry in August 2011

Background information
- Origin: Seoul, South Korea
- Genre: K-pop
- Years active: 2001–2015; 2018; 2022; 2026
- Labels: Star Empire; Giza Studio
- Past members: Kim Ye-won; Baby J; Kim Eunjung; Jung Yoo-jin; Jun Eun-mi; Lee Ji-hyun; Cho Min-ah; Park Jung-ah; Seo In-young; Semi

Jewelry (Korean: 쥬얼리) was a South Korean girl group formed in 2001 by Star Empire Entertainment. The group, which underwent several line-up changes over the years, disbanded in 2015. During their 14-year career, the group released six studio albums, which spawned hit songs including "I Really Like You" (2003), "Superstar" (2005) and "One More Time" (2008). The group also branched out into the Japanese market with the release of several successful singles there.

The group won numerous awards, including Best Female Group at the 2003 and 2005 Mnet Asian Music Awards, and Song of the Year for "One More Time" at the 2008 Golden Disc Awards.

== History ==
=== 2001–2003: Debut, line-up changes, Again & Beloved ===
Jewelry founding members Park Jung-ah, Lee Ji-hyun, Jun Eun-mi and Jung Yoo-jin debuted in 2001 with their debut studio album Discovery. After less-than-stellar sales of the first album, two of the singers (Jun Eun-mi and Jung Yoo-jin) were replaced by Seo In-young and Cho Min-ah.

A year later, their second studio album, Again, was released, with much better results. Full of strong R&B ballads (as opposed to the sexy dance songs that were popular at that time), the album quickly yielded two high-charting singles — "Again" and "Tonight" — which started the group's rise to popularity. This was quickly followed by their third studio album Beloved, which had a very cutesy theme. Their first single "니가 참 좋아" ("I Really Like You") was very poppy and had Jewelry adopt a cutesy concept to match the song, with colorful outfits and perky dances. The title track, Be My Love, was also promoted. Even though album sales for Again and Beloved were great, the group was unhappy with their current image, and did not want to be known for only their cute and innocent songs.

=== 2004–2007: Entry into Japan, breakout album: Superstar & line-up changes ===
After the success of their second album, Jewelry left for Japan to start on their career there in 2004 with their first single Kokoro ga Tomaranai under the independent label Giza Studio. After releasing a few materials there with mediocre sales, the group eventually left to return to their native country to release their fourth album.

By the time their fourth album Superstar came out in the beginning of 2005, Jewelry has since shed their "cute image" concept. Following the trend in Korean pop, they became sexier and more womanly, which helped bring about their current level of success. The first single "Superstar" (written by Shinhwa member Lee Min-woo) was a driven rock song and surprisingly became a huge hit. They followed this up with the sexy R&B number "Passion", which also charted strongly. Both of these singles prominently featured "sexy" member Seo In-Young dance scantily-clad in short shorts, which brought the group much press attention (both positive and negative).

In 2006, Jewelry took a break from the Korean music industry in order to focus on Japan. During that time, member Ji-hyun left to pursue an acting career. In early November, news leaked out that another member, Cho Min-ah, had also left, which forced their record company to look for a second replacement member. As Park Jung-Ah and Seo In-young had solo projects, a new album was not expected until mid-2007.

=== 2008: Line-up changes, rise in fame with Kitchi Island & Everybody Shh! ===
In early 2008, Jewelry returned to the music scene with their new members Baby J and Eunjung with the release of their fifth album, Kitchi Island. Released on February 20, 2008, the album featured the single "One More Time", a cover of In-Grid's song, composed by Sannie Carlson (Whigfield). "One More Time" has mirrored the success of Jewelry's 2005 hit single, "Superstar" in South Korea, reaching the No. 1 spot on MBC's Music Core and KBS's Music Bank, two weeks after the song's debut. The single has also achieved success online, topping the charts of various music websites, including Melon, Dosirak, Bugs Music, M.Net.com, Muz and Juke On. "One More Time" became the most successful single of Jewelry to date, staying on the no.1 spot for 7 weeks in a row on MBC's Music Core and KBS's Music Bank. In spring of 2008, a second single, "모두 다 쉿" ("Everybody Shh!"), was released and promoted.

The group was awarded with a Daesang (대상, a "Top Award"), for highest digital sales in 2008.

=== 2009: Jewelry S, Rally, Sophisticated & line-up changes ===
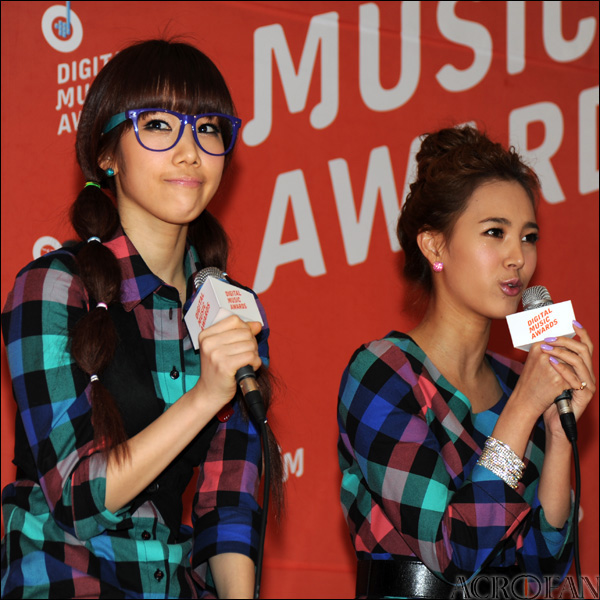
Jewelry S

In early 2009, members Baby J and Eunjung returned to the Korean music market, under the name "Jewelry S", debuting as a sub-group. Their mini-album, Sweet Song was released in digital format on January 22, and the full single was made available on February 6. Baby J and Eunjung made their live comeback on M. Countdown on February 5, where they sang "들어봐" ("Listen") and the lead single from their mini-album, "데이트" ("Date"). The music video for "Date" features cameo appearances from Jewelry members Park Jung-ah and Seo In-young.

Jewelry released a new single in June 2009 titled "Super Star" with the song "Rally" featuring rapper Nassun. The song was for MNet's talent competition, Superstar K. A music video was also released and featured the group's performance of the song on Mnet's M! Countdown as well as scenes of Superstar K.

About a week prior to the album release, the song "Strong Girl" was released as a digital single. Their 6th album, Sophisticated, was released on August 27 with the music video for the title track, "Vari2ty", being released on the same day.

In December 2009 Seo In-young and Park Jung-ah announced their departure. Korean media reported that Superstar K top 10 contender Semi was likely to replace them. A repackaged edition of their 6th album, End And.. was released on December 17, 2009, with the single "Love Story".

=== 2010–2011: Line-up changes, Back It Up, Pass & Forget It ===
On June 14, 2010, it was announced Semi would be joining Jewelry with a comeback happening later during the year. A few months later it was announced the groups comeback would occur in 2011.

On January 18, 2011, Kim Ye-won joined Jewelry. A digital single, "Back It Up" was released on January 27 along with its accompanying music video. They made their comeback performance during the same day on M! Countdown. The single reached a certain amount of success however it was not as successful as their previous works.

On May 9, Jewelry's label, Star Empire Entertainment, shared some old videos of Jewelry rehearsing various songs. Two days later they announced with teaser photos the group would release a new single which was later revealed to be "Pass". The single was released on May 16 along with a teaser MV featuring label mate Hwang Kwang Hee of ZE:A. No music video was released for "Pass".

On September, Semi and Yewon joined the sub-unit Jewelry S and announced they would release a single entitled "Ames Room Vol.2", the title track being the song "Forget It". The single was released on September 20, and the music video was released the same day. Yewon joined the hit variety show Invincible Youth 2 to represent her group. The show started on November 17, 2011, and ended on November 12, 2012.

=== 2012–2013: Look At Me & "Hot & Cold" ===
In 2012, Jewelry was originally scheduled to make a comeback in July. However, this was delayed until October. On September 21, Jewelry announced their comeback with their first extended play "Look At Me", with the title track as the same name. The mini album was released on October 11. "Look At Me" debuted at #42 on the Gaon Digital Charts and later peaked at #23. The mini album also debuted at #7 on the Gaon National Physical Album Charts. The music video was also released during the same day and the group had their comeback performance on Music Bank the next day.

During mid November, Jewelry was announced to release a digital single around early December. But towards the end of November, Star Empire Entertainment, announced the digital single was postponed and the group would spend more time preparing for their next release.

In 2013, Star Empire announced that Jewelry will release a digital single in July called "Hot & Cold".

=== 2014–2015: Members departure and disbandment ===
On March 3, 2014, it was revealed that Eunjung's contract had expired and she would be leaving the group. Yewon was cast in the weekend drama Hotel King, in the role of an enthusiastic front desk officer. On April 17, 2014, Yewon hosted the Mnet talk show M Countdown Begins with K.Will. Meanwhile, Semi starred in a new sitcom, Boarding House no 24 as Park Semi.

On November 19, 2014, Baby J revealed that she will be leaving Jewelry as her contract expired last August. It was also revealed that Semi would not be renewing her contract after it expired that month.

On January 7, 2015, the group was officially confirmed as disbanded.

=== 2018—2026: Reunion ===
On April 8, 2018, members Baby J, Eunjung, Inyoung and Jungah reunited on the JTBC's show Sugarman 2, where they performed their 2008 single "One More Time".

On January 20, 2022, members Baby J, Eunjung, Inyoung and Jungah reunited once again on Mama The Idol, where Jungah was a contestant. They performed One More Time and Super Star.

On June 12, 2026, the group members (Park Jung-ah, Seo In-young, Lee Ji-hyun, Baby J, Cho Min-ah) performed at member Seo In-young’s YouTube channel as a complete group for the first time in 20 years. On September 12, members Jungah, Inyoung, Jihyun and Minah reunited for the first time in 20 years on KBS2's Immortal Songs.

== Members ==
=== Line-ups ===
- First line-up: Jun Eunmi, Jung Yoo-jin, Ji-Hyun, Park Jung-ha.
- Second line-up: Ji-Hyun, Cho Min-ha, Park Jung-ha, Seo In-young.
- Third line-up: Park Jung-ha, Seo In-young, Baby J, Eunjung.
- Final line-up: Baby J, Eunjung, Kim Ye-won, Semi.

=== Member time-line ===
- Kim Ye-won (김예원) (2011–2015) – vocalist
- Park Semi (박세미) (2010–2015) – main vocalist
- Baby J (하주연) (2007–2015) – main rapper, vocalist
- Kim Eun-jung (김은정) (2007–2015) – leader, lead vocalist
- Park Jung-ah (박정아) (2001–2010) – main vocalist, lead dancer
- Seo In-young (서인영) (2002–2010) – lead vocalist, dancer
- Min-ah (조민아) (2001–2006) – vocalist, dancer
- Lee Ji-hyun (이지현) (2001–2006) – rapper, vocalist, dancer
- Jun Eun-mi (전은미) (2001–2002) – vocalist
- Jung Yoo-jin (정유진) (2001–2002) – vocalist

== Discography ==
=== Korean albums ===
- Discovery (2001)
- Again (2002)
- Beloved (2003)
- Super Star (2005)
- Kitchi Island (2008)
- Sophisticated (2009)

=== Japanese albums ===
- Jewelry First (2005)
- Super Star (2005)

== Awards and nominations ==
Award ceremony	Year	Category	Nominee(s) / work(s)	Result	Ref.
Golden Disc Awards	2008	Album Bonsang	Kitchi Island	Won	
Golden Disc Awards	2008	Digital Daesang (Song of the Year)	"One More Time"	Won	
KBS Song Festival	2003	Main Award (Bonsang)	Jewelry	Won	
KBS Song Festival	2005	Best Female Group	Jewelry	Won	
KMTV Korean Music Awards	2002	Best New Group	Jewelry	Won	
KMTV Korean Music Awards	2003	Main Award (Bonsang)	Jewelry	Won	
Mnet 20's Choice Awards	2008	Hot Online Song	"One More Time"	Won	
Mnet Asian Music Awards	2002	Best Female Group	"Again"	Nominated	
Mnet Asian Music Awards	2003	Best Female Group	"I Really Like You"	Won	
Mnet Asian Music Awards	2005	Best Female Group	"Superstar"	Won	
Mnet Asian Music Awards	2008	Best Female Group	"One More Time"	Nominated	
Mnet Asian Music Awards	2008	Best House & Electronic Award	"One More Time"	Won	
Mnet Asian Music Awards	2009	Best Female Group	"Vari2ty"	Nominated	
SBS Gayo Daejeon	2002	SBS Producer's Award	Jewelry	Won	
SBS Gayo Daejeon	2003	Main Award (Bonsang)	Jewelry	Won	
SBS Gayo Daejeon	2005	Main Award (Bonsang)	Jewelry	Won	
Seoul Music Awards	2003	Main Award (Bonsang)	Jewelry	Won	

Awards and achievements
Preceded by Ivy with 이럴거면	23rd Golden Disk Awards Digital Releasing Daesang (Song of the Year); 2008, with "One More Time"	Succeeded by Girls' Generation with "Gee"
