= Crown J =

- Born: Kim Kye-hoon; November 12, 1979 (age 46); Seoul, South Korea
- Genre: K-hiphop
- Occupation: Rapper
- Years active: 2006–present
- Label: Flyboy Entertainment
- Website: loloatl.com

Kim Kye-hoon (Korean: 김계훈; born November 12, 1979), better known by his stage name Crown J (크라운 제이) is a South Korean rapper. He was a cast member in Season 1 of We Got Married from the Chuseok special to episode 41 with Seo In-young as part of the Ant Couple.

== Discography ==
=== Albums ===
- One & Only (2006)
- Miss Me?... (2007)

=== EPs ===
- Fly Boy (2008)
