= V.O.S (band) =

South Korean boyband

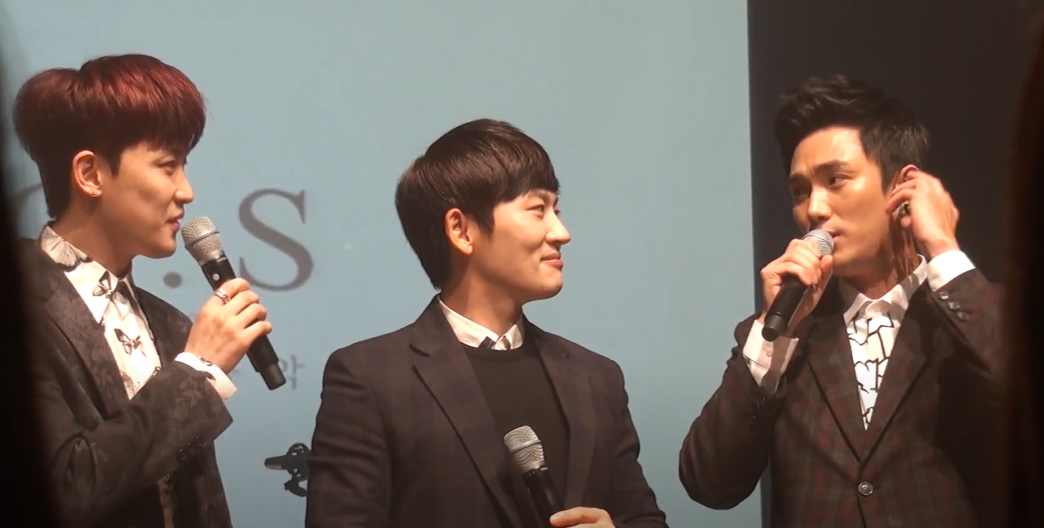

Background information
- Origin: South Korea
- Genres: R&B
- Years active: 2004–present
- Labels: Star Empire Entertainment; Happy Face Entertainment
- Members: Choi Hyun-joon; Kim Kyung-rok; Park Ji-heon

V.O.S (Hangul: 브이오에스; an acronym for Voice of Soul) is a South Korean R&B boy band formed in 2004. The group is composed of three members: Choi Hyun-joon, Kim Kyung-rok and Park Ji-heon. Park Ji-heon departed from the group in 2010, but returned in 2015 when the group signed with Happy Face Entertainment.

== Discography ==
=== Studio albums ===
Title	Album details	Sales
The Real	Released: May 14, 2004; Label: Star Empire Entertainment; Formats: CD, cassette, digital download	KOR: 9,502
Blue Castle	Released: November 24, 2005; Label: Star Empire Entertainment; Formats: CD, cassette, digital download	KOR: 4,968
Wonderful Things	Released: May 15, 2008; Label: Star Empire Entertainment; Formats: CD, digital download	KOR: 18,636

=== Compilation albums ===
Title	Album details	Peak chart positions	Sales
Title	Album details	KOR	Sales
This Is Voice of Soul	Released: March 3, 2010; Label: Star Empire Entertainment; Formats: CD, digital download	4	—N/a

=== Extended plays ===
Title	Album details	Peak chart positions	Sales
Title	Album details	KOR	Sales
Routine Free	Released: May 27, 2009; Label: Star Empire Entertainment; Formats: CD, digital download	—	—N/a
The Blue Bird	Released: September 17, 2010; Label: Star Empire Entertainment; Formats: CD, digital download	17	—N/a
Memory (추억)	Released: November 10, 2010; Label: Star Empire Entertainment; Formats: CD, digital download	17	—N/a
Someday (어느날 어느곳 어디선가)	Released: March 11, 2015; Label: Star Empire Entertainment; Formats: CD, digital download	15	KOR: 741
RE:Union, The Real	Released: January 14, 2016; Label: Happy Face Entertainment; Formats: CD, digital download	12	KOR: 1,254

=== Singles ===
Title	Year	Peak chart positions	Certifications	Album
Title	Year	KOR (Note: The Circle Chart (formerly Gaon Chart) was established in 2010.)	Certifications	Album
"For a Precious Person" (소중한 사람을 위해)	2004	—		The Real
"Look Me in the Eyes and Say It" (눈을 보고 말해요)	2004	—		The Real
"Time Limited Life" (시한부)	2005	—		Blue Castle
"The First Time" (Mordny K Mix) (feat. Seo In-young)	2006	—		Non-album single
"Everyday" (매일매일)	2007	—		This Is Voice of Soul
"Days of Youth" (젊은날)	2008	—		This Is Voice of Soul
"Beautiful Life"	2008	—		Wonderful Things
"In Trouble" (큰일이다)	2009	—		Routine Free
"I Love You" (사랑합니다) (with SG Wannabe)	2009	16		Non-album single
"I'm Sorry." (미안합니다.)	2010	5		This Is Voice of Soul
"Going Crazy" (미치겠다) (with Monday Kiz)	2010	12		Non-album single
"Full Story"	2010	12		The Blue Bird
"You Run in Me.." (내겐 네가 흘러서..)	2010	21		Memory
"Cry and Run" (울면서 달리기)	2014	35		Someday
"The End." (반대로만 살자.) (feat. Nassun)	2014	79		Someday
"Someday" (어느날 어느곳 어디선가)	2015	42		Someday
"The Only One For Me" (그 사람이 너니까)	2016	52		RE:Union, The Real
"Live With Me" (같이살자)	2016	72		Non-album single
"My Melody" (나의 멜로디)	2016	—		Non-album single
"Smile" (웃어)	2017	—		Non-album single
"Nocturn"	2017	—		Non-album single
"Time"	2017	—		Non-album single
"Door" (문)	2018	—		Non-album single
"Again" (다시 만날까 봐)	2019	27	KMCA: Platinum (st.)	Non-album single
"Live Well" (잘 살고 있다)	2019	66		Non-album single
"I Miss You" (잘 지내고 있는지 궁금해)	2020	31		Non-album single
"Call Your Name" (니 이름 불렀나 봐)	2020	80		Non-album single
"Always Be Here" (제자리 걸음)	2021	60		Non-album single
"Let Us Break Up" (헤어지면 돼)	2021	113		Non-album single
"I Found Love" (찾았다 내 사랑)	2022	130		Non-album single
"Missing You" (다시 만날까 봐) (with Lee Ye-joon)	2022	180		Non-album single
"Like Crazy" (미친 것처럼)	2022	55		Non-album single
"I Was You" (나는 너였다)	2022	71		Non-album single
"Don't Say Goodbye" (안녕이라고 말하지마)	2023	32		Non-album single
"Love Rain" (사랑비)	2023	— (Note: "Love Rain" did not enter the Circle Digital Chart, but it peaked at number 37 on the Circle Download Chart.)		Non-album single
"Blooming Flower" (너라는 꽃이 피어나)	2023	— (Note: "Blooming Flower" did not enter the Circle Digital Chart, but it peaked at number 51 on the Circle Download Chart.)		Non-album single
"A Sick Day" (오늘 같이 아픈 날)	2023	— (Note: "A Sick Day" did not enter the Circle Digital Chart, but it peaked at number 53 on the Circle Download Chart.)		Non-album single

== Awards and nominations ==
Year	Award	Category	Nominated work	Result	Ref.
2020	Brand Customer Loyalty Awards	Vocal Group	—N/a	Won	
