= Nasty Nasty (band) =

South Korean vocal group

- Origin: Seoul, South Korea
- Genres: K-pop
- Years active: 2014
- Label: Star Empire Entertainment
- Members: Kevin; Gyeongree; Sojin

Nasty Nasty (stylized as NASTY NASTY) was a unit composed of ZE:A's Kevin, Nine Muses's Gyeongree, and Sojin. It was formed by Star Empire Entertainment in 2014.

== History ==
Star Empire Entertainment began releasing teaser pictures of their first project-unit on August 22 that included ZE:A member Kevin, Nine Muses member Gyeongree, and a trainee named Sojin. The unit, called Nasty Nasty, debuted on September 3, 2014 with their title track "Knock". On January 11, 2015, it was announced that Sojin would join the new line-up of Nine Muses along with another trainee Keumjo after the departure of three of its original members. She made her debut into the group through their single, "Drama", the title track from their third mini-album.

== Discography ==
=== Charted songs ===
Year	Title	Artist(s)	Peak positions	Album
Year	Title	Artist(s)	KOR	Album
2014	"Knock"	Nasty Nasty	77	Knock
