= Imfact =

South Korean boy band

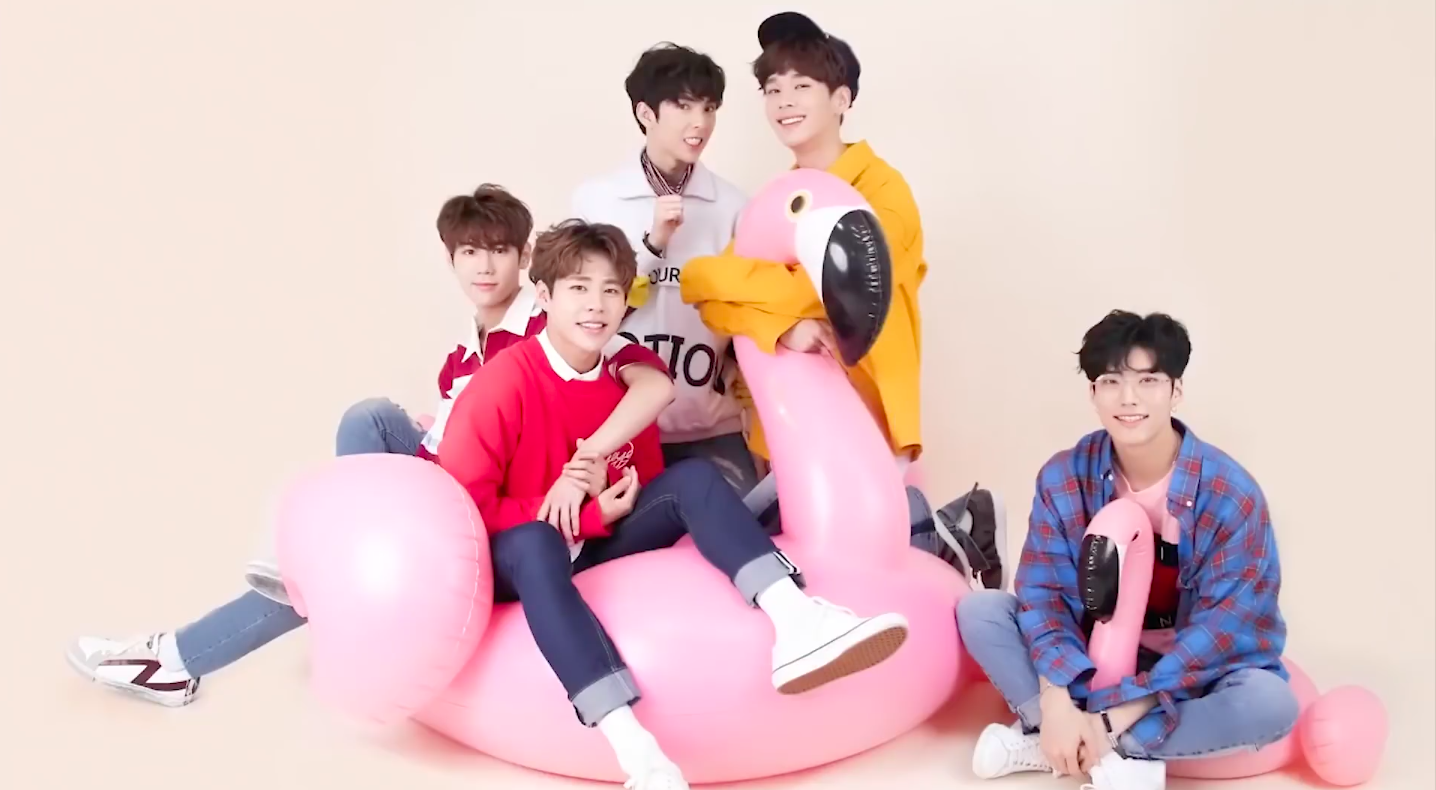

Background information
- Origin: Seoul, South Korea
- Genres: K-pop; hip hop; R&B
- Years active: 2016–2020
- Labels: Star Empire
- Members: Jeup; Taeho; Jian; Sang; Ungjae
- Website: imfact.net

Imfact (Korean: 임팩트, a mixture of I'm Fact and Impact) is a South Korean boy band formed by Star Empire Entertainment in 2016. The group debuted on January 27, 2016, with their single album Lollipop. The group departed from Star Empire Entertainment on January 4, 2022, after all members decided not to renew their contracts. The group consists of five members: Jeup, Taeho, Jian, Sang, and Ungjae.

== History ==
=== Pre-debut ===
Sang was spotted by Star Empire Entertainment, when he was three years old.

Prior to debut, Jian worked as a backup dancer for B1A4 and Juniel. Before training under Star Empire Entertainment, Taeho had trained under several other labels such as MBK Entertainment and Happy Face Entertainment.

=== 2016: Debut with Lollipop and Prism ===
Imfact released their debut single album Lollipop on January 27. The single contains four tracks with the title track being "Lollipop", and was produced by the members. The group officially debuted on January 28 on the music program M Countdown.

Their second single album Prism with the title track "Feel So Good" was released on November 11.

=== 2017: Imfactory and The Unit ===
Imfact announced their 2017 project entitled Imfactory on a launching show on January 7. The project consisted of monthly releases, mini fan meetings and mini concerts. The group released their first monthly song, titled "In The Club", on January 25.

They held their '2017 Imfact Project Imfactory Mini Concert Part 2' on February 25. Their second monthly song "Please Be My First Love" was released on February 27. Their third monthly song "Tension Up" was released on April 5.

On August 24, they were confirmed to join KBS Idol Rebooting Project The Unit. On September 19, Star Empire announced that four members (Jian, Jeup, Taeho and Ungjae) would participate in the show. During the Fourth Mission, Ungjae and his team performed a newly produced song, placed second with “Question”, and got a special video. Jeup finished in eleventh place in the final round and did not enter the debut team. Ungjae, Taeho and Jian were eliminated before the final round.

=== 2018: "The Light" and "Nanana" ===
Imfact made a comeback on April 17 with the digital single "The Light". They performed at KCON 2018 in Los Angeles, making it their first U.S. performance.

On August 16, the group dropped a music video for their digital single "Nanana". The song received generally positive reviews from music critics. Taylor Glasby of Dazed magazine praised "Nanana", stating "its hooky title refrain jumps into a deep house chorus, with cranking EDM beats beneath the verses and bridge." Dazed also ranked it at number 13 in its list of the 20 best K-pop songs of 2018.

=== 2019: Only U and world tour ===
On January 16, it was confirmed that the boys would make their comeback with their third single album Only U on the 24th of that same month.

A day later through their social networks, they released the first teaser photos for their new comeback with a renewed and more mature concept. On January 24, the music video for "Only U" was released. That same day they made their return to the stage on Mnet Countdown for their first presentation of the year.

During 2019, it was announced that the group would be doing their first world tour, visiting countries in Europe, Asia and North America.

=== 2020: "Lie", L.L, and Jeup's enlistment ===
On April 12, the group revealed through their Twitter and Instagram that they would be returning after a year and three months with their fifth digital single "Lie" on the 21st.

It was also reported that the group would be releasing their first mini album, which includes the song "Lie", with the help of the We X Project on April 28. Said album was specially produced by the members of the group.

On July 13, Star Empire confirmed that Member Jeup would be enlisting on the 27th as an active soldier to fulfill his national service.

=== 2021: Taeho's and Ungjae's solo debuts ===
On May 13, it was announced that Taeho would make his solo debut with the digital single "Ggoma" on May 27.

On September 17, it was announced that Ungjae would make his solo debut with his first EP. He first released the pre-release single "Drama" on September 29. On October 29, Taeho released his second digital single "Tell Me".

=== 2022: Departures from Star Empire ===
On January 4, Star Empire announced that the members had chosen not to renew their contracts with the company. However, it was not stated that the group would be disbanding.

== Members ==
Jeup was the first to enlist on July 27, 2020. Following that, Jian enlisted in November 2020. Taeho later enlisted on December 14, 2021.

- Jeup (제업)
- Taeho (태호)
- Jian (지안)
- Leesang (이상)
- Ungjae (웅재)

== Discography ==
=== Extended plays ===
| Title | Album details | Peak chart positions | Sales |
| Title | Album details | KOR | Sales |
|---|---|---|---|
| L.L | Released: April 28, 2020; Label: Star Empire Entertainment; Format: CD, digital download | 14 | KOR: 1,107+ |

=== Single albums ===
| Title | Album details | Peak chart positions | Sales |
| Title | Album details | KOR | Sales |
|---|---|---|---|
| Lollipop | Released: January 27, 2016; Label: Star Empire Entertainment; Format: CD, digital download | 6 | KOR: 5,147+ |
| Prism | Release: November 11, 2016; Label: Star Empire Entertainment; Format: CD, digital download | 13 | KOR: 4,132+ |
| Only U | Release: January 24, 2019; Label: Star Empire Entertainment; Format: CD, digital download | 44 | KOR: 1,587+ |

=== Singles ===
| Title | Year | Peak chart positions | Sales | Album |
| Title | Year | KOR | Sales | Album |
|---|---|---|---|---|
| "Lollipop" (롤리팝) | 2016 | — | KOR: 20,928+ | Lollipop |
| "Feel So Good" | 2016 | 105 | KOR: 23,015+ | Prism |
| "In The Club" (니가 없어) | 2017 | 112 | — | Non-album single |
| "Please Be My First Love" (첫사랑을 부탁해) | 2017 | — | — | Non-album single |
| "Tension Up" (텐션업) | 2017 | — | — | Non-album single |
| "The Light" (빛나) | 2018 | — | — | Only U |
| "Nanana" (나나나) | 2018 | — | — | Only U |
| "Only U" | 2019 | — | — | Only U |
| "Lie" (거짓말이야) | 2020 | — | — | L.L |
"—" denotes releases that did not chart.
