= Lee Ji-hyun (actress, born 1983) =

South Korean actress and singer (born 1983)

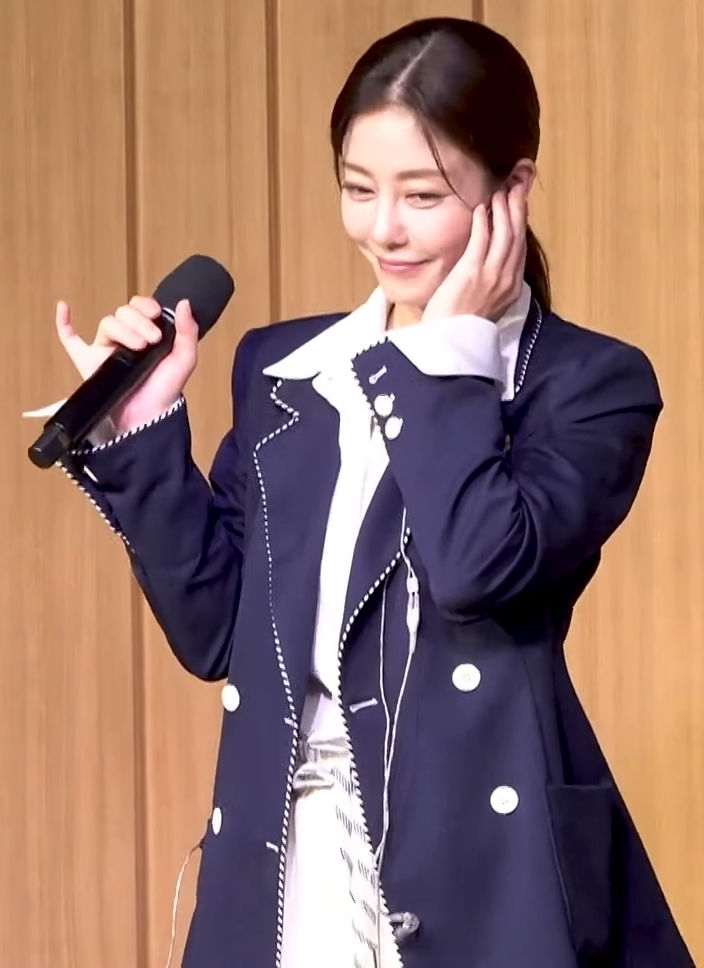
- Lee in 2023
- Born: October 12, 1983 (age 43); Seoul, South Korea
- Occupations: Actress; singer; hairdresser
- Years active: 2001–present
- Organization: Jewelry
- Spouses: Unknown (m. 2013; div. 2016); Unknown (m. 2017; div. 2020)
- Children: 2

Korean name
- Hangul: 이지현
- RR: I Jihyeon
- MR: I Chihyŏn

Lee Ji-hyun (Korean: 이지현; born October 12, 1983) is a South Korean actress, singer and hairdresser. She debuted in 2001 in the girl band Jewelry. She left Jewelry in 2006 and became a host and actress, saying she had not been prepared to be a singer. In 2023 she released a solo single 게리롱 푸리롱. Starting in 2026, she will also work as the hairdresser of a beauty salon in Gwacheon.

== Career ==
=== 2001–present: Career beginnings, debut with Jewelry and departure from Star Empire Entertainment ===
In her teenage years, she studied at Kyoongi University when she was 17, she was discovered at the Star Empire Entertainment and later she became a trainee when her mom attended her dance classes the following month.

In 2001, Lee and the other 3 members debuted as a member of Jewelry, after finding success of the worldwide girl group nations in South Korea, On 2006, The agency announced that Lee's contract was expired and she decided to leave the group.

In 2006, she was now a host television and as an actress, She acted dramas as Tomorrow Victory and A Good Day to Love.

== Filmography ==
=== Television series ===
Year	Title	Role	Network
2004	Show! Haengun Yolcha		KBS2
2006	Happiness Ltd Company		MBC
2007	A Good Day to Love	Kim Soo-Jin	SBS
2015–2016	Tomorrow Victory	Han Se-Ri	MBC
2020–2022	Hero Circle	Lilith	EBS

=== Variety show ===
Year	Title	Notes/Ref.
2003	X-Man	Cast member
2023	Going to Court	Host
