= Seo In-young =

South Korean dancer and musician (born 1984)

- 서인영
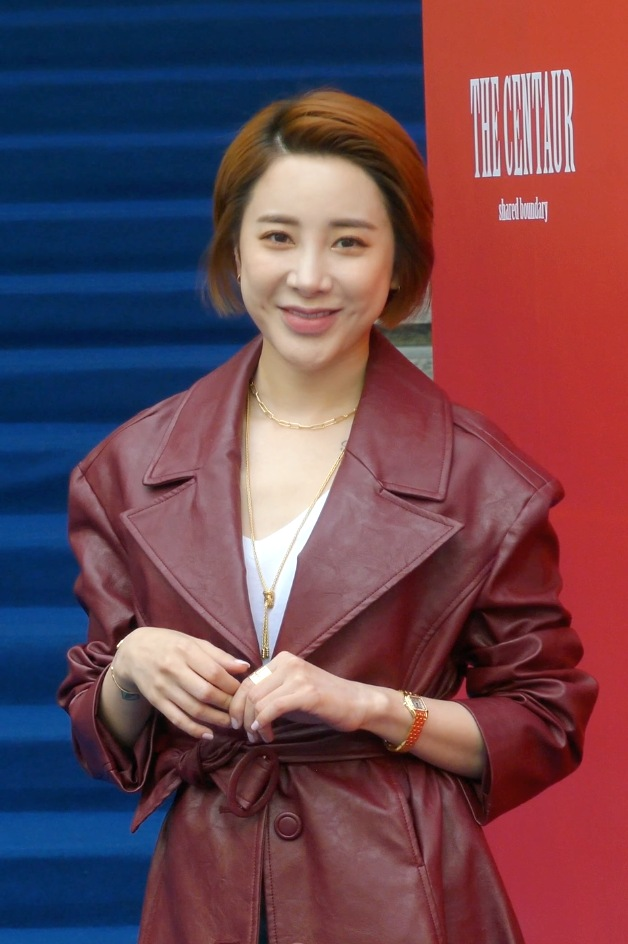
- Seo at Seoul Fashion Week in 2018
- Born: Seo In-young; September 3, 1984 (age 42)
- Other name: Elly
- Occupations: Singer; dancer; actress; model; television host
- Spouse: Unknown (m. 2023; div. 2024)
- Musical career
- Genres: K-pop; R&B; Hip Hop
- Years active: 2002–present
- Labels: Star Empire; IY Company/EB; Playtone; Star Empire; Soribada
- Formerly of: Jewelry
- Website: iycompany.co.kr

Korean name
- Hangul: 서인영
- Hanja: 徐寅永
- RR: Seo Inyeong
- MR: Sŏ Inyŏng

Seo In-young (Korean: 서인영; born September 3, 1984), also known as Elly, is a South Korean singer, dancer, model, television host, and actress. She was a member of girl group Jewelry and featured on the reality show We Got Married with Crown J. In May 2012, Seo established her own private entertainment company, IY Company. Seo also hosted the beauty program Star Beauty Show (2012).

== Career ==
=== 2007: Elly Is So Hot ===
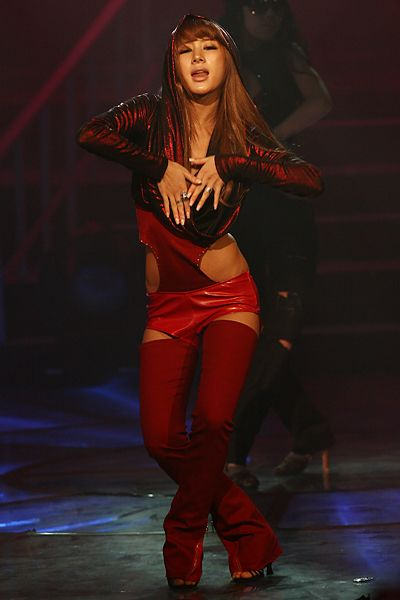
Seo promoting her solo debut on Inkigayo in February 2007

On February 26, 2007, Seo In-young released her first solo album, Elly Is So Hot. Despite being known as the 'sexy dancer' of Jewelry, she stated she wanted to move away from her strong dance image and become a softer, elegant and more sensual entertainer. The first single from the album was "I Want You" ("너를 원해"), which was written, composed, and produced by Jung Yeon-joon of Uptown.

The song, which has a mix of Latin and R&B styles, was promoted as a dance remix near the end of her promotional activities.

=== 2008: Elly Is Cinderella ===
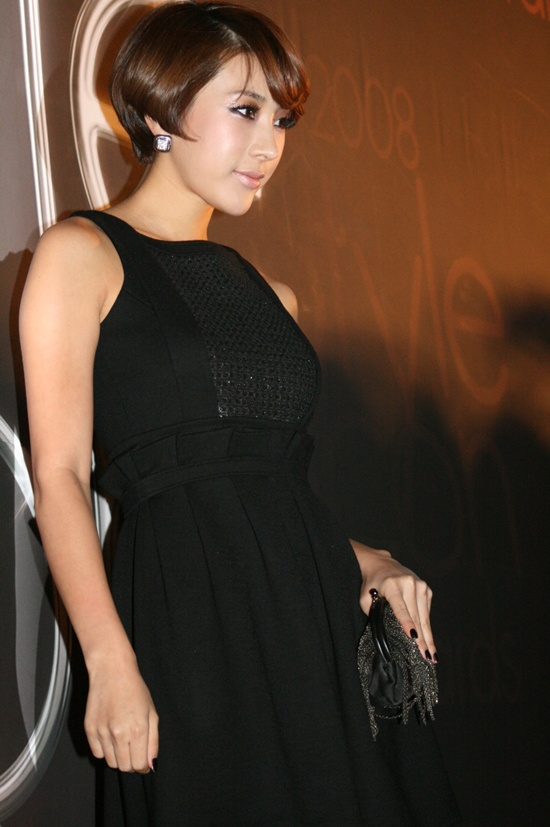
Seo at the 2008 Style Icon Awards

In February 2008, it was announced that the singer would be participating in the popular MBC variety show We Got Married. She was paired with Korean urban artist Crown J. The couple was later coined as the 'Ant Couple'. The couple later released a digital single titled"Too Much", which was eventually used as the theme song for the show. A club remix version was released on her second solo album.

On July 23, 2008, Seo In-young released her second solo album, Elly Is Cinderella. The music video of the lead single, "Cinderella", was composed by PSY. The song continued her success as solo artist.

=== 2009: Departure from Jewelry ===
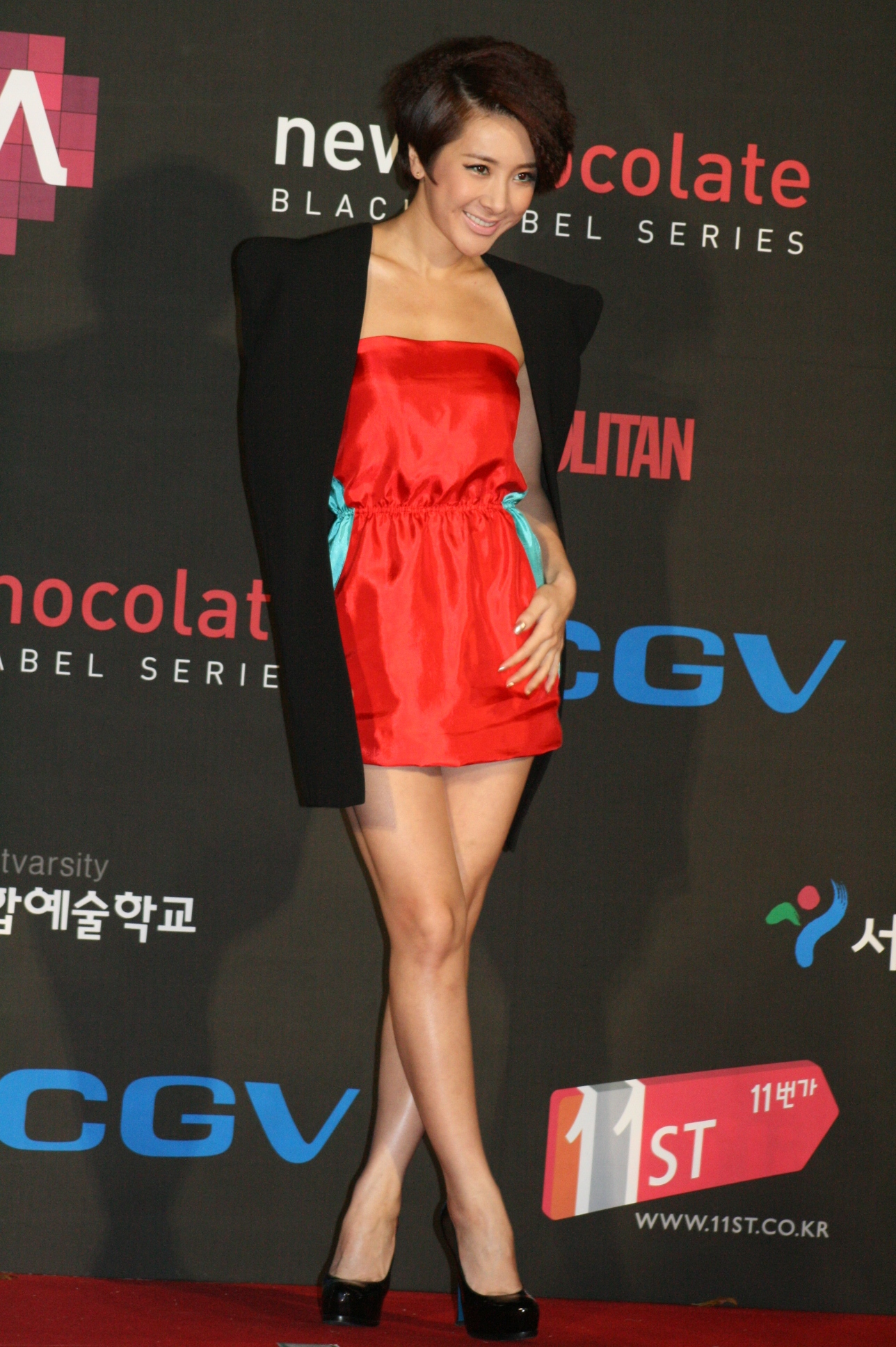
Seo at the 2009 Style Icon Awards

On December 11, 2009, it was announced that Seo In-young, as well as fellow Jewelry member Park Jung-ah, would be leaving the group to fully commit to their solo careers. Both members left the group after finishing promotional activities for the song Sophisticated.

=== 2010: Lov-Elly and Ellythm ===
On May 12, 2010, Seo In-young pre-released, "Goodbye Romance", the lead single from her upcoming album. On June 6, 2010, her third album, Lov-Elly, was released. (This was her first release since leaving Jewelry.) The album, which consists of all ballads, showed a soft, but powerful side to the singer.

"Goodbye Romance" experienced enormous chart success and eventually peaked at No. 1 on the music program M! Countdown, earning the singer her first solo award.

In July 2010, the singer joined the SBS reality show Heroes. She received a lot of negative press for her feisty and headstrong persona.

On December 12, 2010, Seo In-young released her first single album, Ellythm. It includes the lead single "Into The Rhythm".

=== 2011: Wash and Brand New Elly ===
In early 2011, the Jongno branch of Cheil Industries named Seo In-young as the creative director of their imports division. She worked with French luxury brand 'Nina Ricci' to design a limited edition handbag line named 'Nine Ricci x Seo In-young'.

On May 6, 2011, Seo In-young released her second single album Wash. The emotional song showcased her exceptionally powerful vocals. The music video was said to be filmed in Thailand, with a concept of multiple emotions, such as an elegant woman underwater and a sad woman in front of a mirror. Star Empire Entertainment released a music video teaser and a behind the scenes video, however, no official music video was released.

On August 20, 2011, the singer participated in the popular television show Immortal Songs 2. The episode, dubbed 'female vocalist special', showcased seven of South Korea's top female vocalists. Seo In-Young's rendition of Just Like The First Time won the hearts of viewers and was declared as the best performance of the episode.

On October 4, 2011, two comeback photos of the singer were released ahead of her official comeback. In early November, she pre-released the song Loser. On November 13, 2011, the singer officially released her third album, Brand New Elly, with the lead single Oh My Gosh.

=== 2012: IY Company, "Anymore" and "Let's Dance" ===
On May 18, 2012, it was announced that Seo In-young would be establishing her own private entertainment company, IY Company. She is no longer associated or under contract with Star Empire Entertainment.

On August 13, 2012, Seo In-young became the main MC of 'SBS E! – Star Beauty Show'. The show focuses on beauty and fashion tips.

On August 13, 2012, a music video teaser for Seo In-young's digital single, "Anymore", was released. It was later revealed the song was produced by popular producer Kush. The single was officially released on August 19, 2012. The full-length music video was released two days later. The single quickly experienced enormous success, securing the No. 1 spot on every single Korean music chart, achieving the coveted 'all-kill'.

On October 15, 2012, Seo In-young revealed a music video teaser for "Let's Dance". The song, which was digitally released on October 17, 2012, is a dance track combining elements of electronic disco as well as post disco, further showing the musical style changes Seo In-young has been going through. On October 18, 2012, Seo In-young took to the stage and began promotions on M! Countdown, where she performed ANYMORE and Let's Dance.

=== 2013: Forever Young and "Love Me" ===
In early 2013, Seo In-young became a main voice coach for Voice Korea Kids, a spin-off of The Voice of Korea. The show aired from January 4, 2013, to February 1, 2013.

On May 2, 2013, Seo In-young announced that she would be making her first comeback of the year with the release of concept photos and a music video teaser. Her company, IY Company, stated, "With her talents, this will be an album that showcases her new potential." On May 14, 2013, Seo In-young released her first mini-album in two years, titled Forever Young. The album is considered Seo In-young's return to ballads and contains the promotional single "Let's Break Up."

On September 23, 2013, it was announced that Seo In-young would be returning to the music scene with a digital single titled "Love Me". According to Seo In-young, the song is "an upbeat dance track through which she puts aside her previous ballad concept". On October 3, 2013, Seo In-young debuted her new song, "Love Me", through a pre-release performance on Mnet's M! Countdown. The single and music video were officially released the following day. "Love Me" was instantly met with positive reviews and quickly climbed digital charts.

=== 2016: Return to Star Empire Entertainment ===
Seo In-young returned to Star Empire after four years, stating it was a "move of loyalty".

== Personal life ==
On December 26, 2022, Seo announced that she will hold a wedding ceremony with her boyfriend on February 26, 2023. On November 27, 2024, it was confirmed that Seo was in the process of filing for divorce after months of speculation. The next day, Seo's agency confirmed the divorce had been finalized.

== Discography ==
=== Studio albums ===
Title	Album details	Sales
Elly Is So Hot	Released: February 27, 2007; Label: Star Empire Entertainment, CJ E&M; Format: CD, digital download	KOR: 5,093

=== Extended plays ===
Title	Details	Peak chart positions	Sales
Title	Details	KOR	Sales
Elly Is Cinderella	Released: July 23, 2008; Label: Star Empire Entertainment, CJ&EM; Format: CD, digital download	—	KOR: 3,851
Lov-Elly	Released: June 1, 2010; Label: Star Empire Entertainment, CJ E&M; Format: CD, digital download	11	
Brand New Elly	Released: November 16, 2011; Label: Star Empire Entertainment, CJ E&M; Format: CD, digital download	23	KOR: 1,270
Forever Young	Released: May 15, 2013; Label: In Young Company, CJ E&M; Format: CD, digital download	14	KOR: 793
Re Birth	Released: June 10, 2015; Label: Playtone Entertainment, CJ E&M; Format: CD, digital download	17	KOR: 615
SIY	Released: November 17, 2015; Label: Playtone Entertainment, CJ E&M; Format: CD, digital download	15	KOR: 1,021
"—" denotes releases that did not chart. Note – The Gaon Chart was established in February 2010. Releases before this date have no chart data.

=== Singles ===
Title	Year	Peak chart positions	Album
Title	Year	KOR	Album
"I Want You" (너를 원해)	2007	—	Elly Is So Hot
"Cinderella"	2008	—	Elly Is Cinderella
"Goodbye Romance" (잘가요 로맨스)	2010	23	Lov-Elly
"Written As Love, Sung As Pain" (사랑이라 쓰고 아픔이라 부른다)	2010	4	Lov-Elly
"Into the Rhythm" (리듬속으로)	2010	17	Non-album singles
"Wash" (세수)	2011	14	Non-album singles
"Oh My Gosh"	2011	33	Brand New Elly
"Anymore"	2012	4	Forever Young
"Let's Dance"	2012	39	Forever Young
"Let's Break Up" (헤어지자)	2013	13	Forever Young
"Love Me" (나를 사랑해줘) (featuring Gaeko)	2013	10	Non-album singles
"Thinking of You" (생각나) (featuring Zion.T)	2014	49	Non-album singles
"Lie" (거짓말) (featuring Kanto)	2015	33	ReBirth
"Let's Just Say We Loved" (사랑했다 치자) (featuring Lil Boi)	2015	21	Non-album single
"Scream" (소리질러)	2015	92	SIY
"Embraced By Your Arms" (너에게 안겨)	2016	109	Non-album singles
"Close Your Eyes" (눈을 감아요)	2018	—	Non-album singles
"Believe Me" (편해졌니)	2018	—	Non-album singles
"—" denotes releases that did not chart. Note – The Gaon Chart was established in February 2010. Releases before this date have no chart data.

=== Collaborations ===
Title	Year	Peak chart positions	Album
Title	Year	KOR	Album
"Bubble Love" (with MC Mong)	2010	3	Cho Young Soo All Star 2.5
"Making a Lover" (애인만들기) (with Kyunwoo)	2011	31	Non-album singles
"Shooting Star" (with Park Jung-ah, ZE:A, Jewelry & Nine Muses)	2011	66	Non-album singles
"Our Night is Brighter Than Your Day" (우리의 밤은 당신의 낮보다 아름답다) (with Yoon Bo-mi, Kim Nam-joo, Jung Chae-yeon, LE, Lee Seok-hoon, Wuno, Yang Da-il, Brother Su, Chancellor & Kang Min-hee)	2016	89	Non-album singles

=== Soundtrack appearances ===
Title	Year	Peak chart positions	Album
Title	Year	KOR	Album
"Can't I Love?" (사랑하면 안되나요)	2009	18	Iris OST
"Give Me" (with Nine Muses)	2010	53	Prosecutor Princess OST
"You Are the Love" (너는 사랑이다)	2013	38	Incarnation of Money OST
"I Still Love You" ( 여전히 사랑하고 있어)	2018	—	Queen of Mystery 2 OST
"You Resemble a Rainbow" (무지개 닮은 너)	2019	—	Blessing of the Sea OST
"I Am not Asking for Much" (내가 많은 걸 바라는 게 아니잖아)	2021	—	School 2021 OST
"—" denotes releases that did not chart.

== Filmography ==
=== Drama ===
- 2009: Style (Cameo)
- 2011: Bravo, My Love! (Cameo)
- 2016: One More Happy Ending (Leading role)

=== Variety ===
- 2008: Music Bank (Main MC; August 29, 2008 – January 9, 2009)
- 2009: We Got Married (S1; EP 1–41)
- 2009: Seo In-young's Kaist
- 2009: Seo In-young's Best Friend
- 2010: Heroes (EP 1–40)
- 2012: Star Beauty Show (Main MC)
- 2013: The Voice Kids (Coach)
- 2013: Immortal Songs 2
- 2015: King of Mask Singer (Daebak Change 1+1; EP 9)
- 2016: Real Men (cast member, Navy NCO special)
- 2016: With You (S2; 78-present with Crown J)
- 2022: We Are Family (MBC, Cast Member)

== Awards and nominations ==
Award	Year	Category	Nominated work / nominee	Result	Ref.
Korea Fashion & Design Awards	2008	Fashion Icon of the Year	Seo In-young	Won	
MBC Entertainment Awards	2008	Excellence Award in Variety Show	Seo In-young	Won	
Mnet 20's Choice Awards	2008	Hot Couple Award	Seo In-young and Crown J	Won	
Mnet 20's Choice Awards	2010	Most Influential Star	Seo In-young	Won	
Mnet Asian Music Awards	2007	Best Dance Performance	"I Want You"	Nominated	
Mnet Asian Music Awards	2008	Best Female Artist	"Cinderella"	Nominated	
Mnet Asian Music Awards	2010	Best Female Artist	"Written as Love, Sung as Pain"	Nominated	
Mnet Asian Music Awards	2010	Best Vocal Performance (Solo)	"Written as Love, Sung as Pain"	Nominated	
Mnet Asian Music Awards	2011	Best Female Artist	"Into The Rhythm"	Nominated	
Mnet Asian Music Awards	2011	Style in Music Award	Seo In-young	Won	
Mnet Asian Music Awards	2012	Best Dance Performance	"Let's Dance"	Nominated	
Mnet Asian Music Awards	2013	Best Dance Performance	"Please Love Me"	Nominated	
Style Icon Awards	2008	Female Singer Award	Seo In-young	Won	
