= Star Empire Entertainment =

South Korean record label

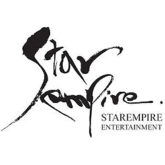
- Native name: (주) 스타제국
- Company type: Private
- Industry: Entertainment
- Genre: K-pop; R&B; Hip hop; Dance; Electronic
- Founded: February 9, 2000; 26 years ago
- Founder: Shin Ju-hak
- Defunct: 2024
- Headquarters: Seoul, South Korea
- Number of locations: 376-28 Hapjeongdong, Mapo-gu
- Key people: Shin Ju-hak (CEO)
- Website: starempire.co.kr

Star Empire Entertainment (Korean:스타제국 Seuta Jeguk) was a South Korean private-held entertainment company founded in 2000 by Shin Ju-hak.

It was formerly home to artists like Jewelry, Nine Muses, ZE:A, V.O.S, Imfact, and Ariaz.

== History ==
=== 2000–2009: Established and first generation artists ===
Star Empire Entertainment was founded in 2000 and successfully debuted idol groups Jewelry in 2001 and V.O.S. in 2004.

In 2007, Star Empire signed established artist Poppin' Hyun Joon.

In February 2009, Star Empire debuted soloist Kim Sori, who joined the agency after failing the audition to become a new member of Jewelry in late 2006.

=== 2010–2014: Joint ventures and second generation artists ===
Star Empire debuted a nine-member boy group ZE:A in January 2010, the first boy group since V.O.S six years prior. In March 2010, KMP Holdings, "Korean Music Power," was established via a joint venture between SM, YG, JYP, Star Empire Entertainment, and other companies including Medialine, CAN Entertainment and Music Factory among others as the official distributor of their releases.

Star Empire debuted a nine-member girl group Nine Muses in August 2010 with an admissions and graduation concept. It was the company's first girl group since Jewelry nine years prior.

In January, Nine Muses members Bini and Rana left the group following the expiration of their contracts, while Euaerin rejoined the group.

In November 2012, KMP Holdings was acquired by KT Music, and in June 2013, KT Music absorbed KMP's distribution network.

On January and June 2014, Lee Sem and Eunji had left the group and the agency, Ryu Sera also left Nine Muses and the company after her contract expired.

Star Empire debuted a four-member boy group SoReal in 2014. On January 7, 2015, Star Empire announced that Jewelry officially disbanded 14 years after debut. At the end of 2015, V.O.S officially left the company after their contracts expired.

=== 2016–present: Third generation artists and Rising Star Entertainment ===
In January 2016, Star Empire debuted boy group Imfact. On March 4, former Jewelry member, Seo In-young again signed with Star Empire Entertainment after previously parting ways in 2012.

On February 9, 2017, it was falsely stated that ZE:A were disbanding after reports surfaced of group members departing the company. However, it was later confirmed by the members themselves that this was not the case, and that for the time being they would focus on solo activities. On April 12, Star Empire gave an official statement confirming that ZE:A is not disbanding and will come back as a group again when the time comes.

On July 18, 2018, SoReal's three members (Ryu Phillip, Ju Daegeon, Kang Sungho) released a song "One and Only" as Tri:al (트라이얼) under Together E&M Entertainment confirming their departure from Star Empire.

On February 10, 2019, Star Empire announced the official disbandment of Nine Muses when members Hyemi, Keumjo and Sojin left the company. On July 31, 2019, Gyeongree became the last member of the band to part ways with the company following her contract expiration. This also marked the disbandment of NASTY NASTY, a co-ed project group also containing Gyeongree and Sojin.

In September 2019, Star Empire announced that six-member girl group Ariaz will debut on October 24, 2019, under their affiliate, Rising Star Entertainment.

On January 4, 2022, Star Empire announced that the members of Imfact have chosen to depart from the company.

On April 10, 2022, Rising Star announced that Yunji, Yeori and Hyogyeong have terminated their contracts with them and left the group. On the same day, Jueun posted on Instagram confirming that she has left the group, effectively disbanding Ariaz.

As of 2024, Star Empire Entertainment's website has been officially shut down.

== Artists ==
=== Recording artists ===
Groups

- ZE:A
  - ZE:A 4U
  - ZE:A Five
  - ZE:A J

== Former artists ==
Former recording artists

- A-Force (2009–2013, project group)
- Kim Sori (2006–2009)
- Poppin' Hyun Joon (2007–2013)
- Nine Muses (2010–2019)
  - Jaekyung (2010)
  - Rana (2010–2011)
  - Bini (2010–2011)
  - Lee Sem (2010–2014)
  - Park Eunji (2010–2014)
  - Ryu Sera (2010–2014)
  - E.u.e.rine (2010–2016)
  - Minha (2010–2016)
  - Moon Hyuna (2010–2016)
  - Pyo Hyemi (2010–2019)
  - Son Sungah (2012–2019)
  - Park Gyeongree (2012–2019)
  - Jo Sojin (2014–2019)
  - Lee Keumjo (2015–2019)
- Jewelry (2001–2015)
  - Jun Eun Mi (2001–2002)
  - Jung Yoo Jin (2001–2002)
  - Lee Ji Hyun (2001–2006)
  - Choi Min Ah (2002–2006)
  - Park Jung Ah (2001–2010)
  - Seo In-young (2002–2012, 2016–2017)
  - Eunjung (2008–2014)
  - Baby J (2008–2014)
  - Semi (2010–2014)
  - Kim Ye-won (2011–2016)
- V.O.S (2004–2015)
- ZE:A
  - Kevin (2010-2017)
  - Hwang Kwang-hee (2010-2017)
  - Im Si-wan (2010-2017)
  - Moon Joon-young (2010-2017)
  - Kim Tae-heon (2010-2017)
  - Jung Hee-chul (2010-2017)
  - Ha Min-woo (2010-2017)
  - Park Hyung-sik (2010-2017)
  - Kim Dong-jun (2010-2017)
- Nasty Nasty
- SoReal
- Imfact (2016–2022)
  - Jeup (2016–2022)
  - Taeho (2016–2022)
  - Jian (2016–2022)
  - Sang (2016–2022)
  - Ungjae (2016–2022)
- Ariaz
  - Yunji (2019–2022)
  - Yeori (2019–2022)
  - Hyogyeong (2019–2022)

Former actors

- Hong Soo-ah
- Oh Ji-ho
- Kim Si-hyang
- Park Hyung-sik
- Julien Kang

== Concert and tours ==
- 2016 Star Empire 1st Concert "Family Concert"
  - 2 September - Tokyo, Japan at Zepp Tokyo
