= Crayon Pop discography =

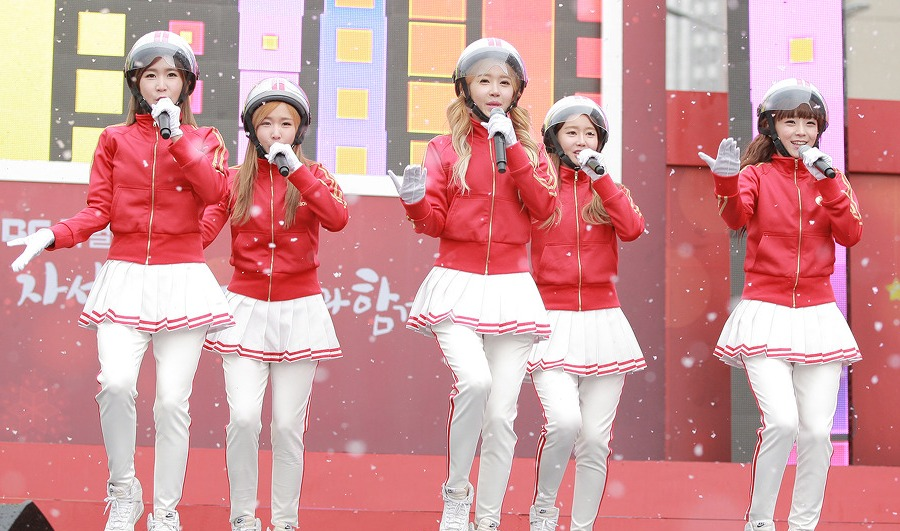
- Crayon Pop in December 2013
- Studio albums: 2
- EPs: 4
- Singles: 12
- Video albums: 1
- Music videos: 12

Crayon Pop is a South Korean girl group formed by Chrome Entertainment in 2012. The discography consists of two studio albums, four extended plays, twelve singles and twelve music videos. Members Choa and Way have also released an extended play, The 1st Mini Album, as Crayon Pop – Strawberry Milk.

== Albums ==
=== Studio albums ===
List of studio albums, with selected chart positions and sales figures
Title	Album details	Peak chart positions		Sales
Title	Album details	KOR	JPN	Sales
Korean
Evolution Pop Vol. 1	Released: September 26, 2016; Label: Chrome Entertainment, Sony Music; Format: CD, Digital download; Tracks list: 1. Vroom Vroom (부릉부릉); 2. Too Much; 3. Doo Doom Chit (두둠칫); 4. Tonight; 5. Get It Here (다가와); 6. Sketch Book (스케치북); 7. Love Couple (feat. The Zoo); 8. Vroom Vroom (Inst.); 9. Doo Doom Chit (Inst.)	10	—	KOR: 3,302+
Japanese
Crayon Pop	Released: January 20, 2016; Label: Pony Canyon; Format: CD; Tracks list: 1. We Are Pirates!; 2. Dancing All Night; 3. Bar Bar Bar (Japanese Ver.); 4. Uh-ee (Japanese Ver.); 5. Dancing Queen (Japanese Ver.); 6. FM (Japanese Ver.); 7. Saturday Night (Japanese Ver.); 8. RaRiRuRe (ラリルレ); 9. Bing Bing (Japanese Ver.); 10. 1,2,3,4 (Japanese Ver.)	—	27	JPN: 2,952+

=== Video albums ===
List of video albums, with selected chart positions and sales figures
Title	Album details	Peak chart positions	Sales
Title	Album details	JPN	Sales
Pop in Japan	Released: March 16, 2016; Label: Pony Canyon; Format: DVD	51	JPN: 688+

== Extended plays ==
List of extended plays, with selected chart positions and sales figures
Title	Details	Peak chart positions		Sales
Title	Details	KOR	JPN	Sales
Korean
Crayon Pop 1st Mini Album	Released: July 18, 2012; Label: Chrome Entertainment, CJ E&M Music; Format: Digital download; Tracks list: 1. Bing Bing"; 2. Saturday Night; 3. Bing Bing (Inst.); 4. Saturday Night (Inst.); 5. Saturday Night (Dubstep Mix)	—	—	
The Streets Go Disco	Released: September 26, 2013; Label: Chrome Entertainment, Sony Music; Format: CD, digital download; Tracks list: 1. Bar Bar Bar 2.0 (빠빠빠 2.0); 2. Bar Bar Bar (Original ver.) (CD only); 3. Dancing Queen 2.0; 4. Dancing Queen (Original ver.) (CD only); 5. Saturday Night (Dubstep ver.) (CD only); 6. Saturday Night (Original ver.) (CD only); 7. Bing Bing (Poppin ver.); 8. Bing Bing (Original ver.) (CD only)	5	—	KOR: 14,464+; JPN: 1,135+
FM	Released: March 27, 2015; Label: Chrome Entertainment, Sony Music; Format: CD, digital download; Tracks list: 1. FM; 2. Hapataka; 3. 1, 2, 3, 4; 4. FM (Inst.); 5. Hapataka (Inst.); 6. 1, 2, 3, 4 (Inst.)	6	—	KOR: 5,521+
Japanese
Pop! Pop! Pop!	Released: November 19, 2014; Label: Pony Canyon; Format: CD + DVD	—	48	JPN: 2,007+
"—" denotes releases that did not chart or were not released in that region.

== Singles ==
List of singles, with selected chart positions and sales figures
Title	Year	Peak chart positions							Sales	Album
Title	Year	KOR Gaon Digital	KOR Gaon Album	KOR Billboard	AUS Hitseeker	JPN Oricon	JPN Billboard	US World Digital	Sales	Album
Korean
"Bing Bing"	2012	—	—N/a	—	—	—	—	—		Crayon Pop 1st Mini Album
"Saturday Night"	2012	235	—N/a	—	—	—	—	—		Crayon Pop 1st Mini Album
"Dancing Queen"	2012	156	—N/a	—	—	—	—	—	KOR: 19,177+ (DL)	Dancing Queen
"Bar Bar Bar"	2013	3	21	1	14	—	—	—	KOR: 4,091+ (CD); KOR: 1,162,646+ (DL)	Bar Bar Bar
"Lonely Christmas"	2013	12	6	17	—	—	—	—	KOR: 4,997+ (CD); KOR: 401,971+ (DL)	Lonely Christmas
"Hero" (with Kim Jang-hoon)	2014	137	—N/a	71	—	—	—	—	KOR: 12,234+ (DL)	Non-album single
"Uh-ee"	2014	10	9	8	—	—	—	15	KOR: 5,742+ (CD); KOR: 380,845+ (DL)	Uh-ee
"Hey Mister"	2014	60	15	50	—	—	—	—	KOR: 1,151+ (CD); KOR: 46,513+ (DL)	Trot Lovers OST Part 1
"C'mon C'mon" (뜬뜬뜬뜬 뜨든뜬)	2014	145	—N/a	—N/a	—	—	—	—		High School: Love On OST Part 5
"Love Christmas" (with K-Much, Bob Girls, and Zan Zan)	2014	134	12	—N/a	—	—	—	—	KOR: 1,733+ (CD)	2014 Chrome Family – A Very Special Christmas
"FM"	2015	45	—N/a	—N/a	—	—	—	—	KOR: 73,381 (DL)	FM
"Sup (Wassup)" (뭐해) (featuring Robin Deiana)	2015	82	—N/a	—N/a	—	—	—	—	KOR: 23,112 (DL)	The Artist Diary Project Part 11
"Vroom Vroom" (부릉부릉)	2016	—	—N/a	—N/a	—	—	—	—	KOR: 3,549 (DL)	Evolution Pop Vol. 1
"Doo Doom Chit" (두둠칫)	2016	94	—N/a	—N/a	—	—	—	—	KOR: 17,136+	Evolution Pop Vol. 1
Chinese
"123 Happy New Year" (123 新年好) (with Wang Bowen, DT Boys)	2015	—	—N/a	—N/a	—	—	—	—		Non-album single
Japanese
"Rarirure" (ラリルレ)	2015	—	—N/a	—N/a	—	25	94	—	JPN: 4,840+ (CD)	Crayon Pop
"Dancing All Night"	2015	—	—N/a	—N/a	—	21	—	—	JPN: 6,197+ (CD)	Crayon Pop
English
"Get Dumb" (Note: Also released in a "K-Mex" (Korean/Spanish) version) (CD9 featuring Crayon Pop)	2016	—	—N/a	—N/a	—	—	—	—		Non-album single
"—" denotes releases that did not chart or were not released in that region.

== Other charted songs ==
List of songs, with selected chart positions and sales figures
Title	Year	Peak chart positions		Sales	Album
Title	Year	KOR Gaon	KOR Billboard	Sales	Album
"Bar Bar Bar 2.0"	2013	184	98	KOR: 8,362+ (DL)	The Streets Go Disco
"Dancing Queen 2.0"	2013	43	44	KOR: 104,870+ (DL)	The Streets Go Disco

== Music videos ==
List of music videos, with directors
Title	Year	Director	Other version(s)
Korean
"Saturday Night" (CG Version)	2012	Kwon Jae-yeon	New version; Unreleased Cut
"Bing Bing"	2012	Unknown	
"Dancing Queen"	2012	Unknown	
"Bar Bar Bar" (Story Version)	2013	Unknown	
"Bar Bar Bar" (Choreography Version)	2013	Kwon Jae-yeon	
Bar Bar Bar 2.0" (Global Version)	2013	Kwon Soon-wook	
"Dancing Queen 2.0"	2013	Kwon Jae-yeon	
"Lonely Christmas"	2013	Unknown	
"Hero"	2014	Unknown	Choreography version
"Uh-ee"	2014	Unknown	
"Hey Mister"	2014	Unknown	
"C'mon C'mon"	2014	Unknown	
"Love Christmas"	2014	Unknown	
"FM"	2015	Lee Gi-baek	Choreography version
"Doo Doom Chit"	2016	Unknown	
Japanese
"Bing Bing"	2012	Unknown	
"Saturday Night"	2012	Unknown	
"1,2,3,4"	2013	Unknown	
"Rarirure"	2015	Unknown	
"Dancing All Night"	2015	Unknown	
Chinese
"123 Happy New Year"	2015	Unknown	

== Strawberry Milk discography ==
Strawberry Milk discography
- EPs: 1
- Singles: 1
- Music videos: 2

=== Extended plays ===
Title	Details	Peak chart positions	Sales
Title	Details	KOR	Sales
The 1st Mini Album	Released: October 15, 2014; Label: Chrome Entertainment, Sony Music; Format: CD, digital download	8	KOR: 4,995+

=== Singles ===
Title	Year	Peak chart positions	Sales	Album
Title	Year	KOR	Sales	Album
"OK" (오케이)	2014	93	KOR: 24,630+ (DL)	The 1st Mini Album
"I Hate You" (니가 미워)	2016	—		VUL Vol.1 니가 미워
"Always" (늘)	2016	—		Secret Healer OST
"Christmas for you"	2017	—		Non-album single
"My Universe" (나의 우주)	2019	—		Non-album single

=== Music videos ===
Title	Year	Director
OK	2014	Lee Gi-baek
OK (Choreography Version)	2014	
My Universe	2019	AAPlat
