= Lonely Christmas =

Lonely Christmas may refer to:

- "(It's Gonna Be a) Lonely Christmas", The Orioles song, 1948
- Lonely Christmas EP, by Sloppy Seconds, 1992
- "Lonely Christmas", Crayon Pop song, 2013
- "Lonely Christmas", Bryson Tiller song, 2021
