= FM (EP) =

EP by Crayon Pop
- Released: March 27, 2015
- Genre: K-pop
- Length: 19:50
- Language: Korean
- Label: Chrome Entertainment; Sony Music

Crayon Pop chronology
Pop! Pop! Pop! (2014)	FM (2015)	Crayon Pop (2016)

Singles from FM
- 1. "FM" Released: March 27, 2015

FM is the third Korean mini album of South Korean girl group Crayon Pop. It was released on March 27, 2015, one year after their last Korean release, "Uh-ee". The lead single of the same name was written by hitmaker Shinsadong Tiger and has a "female warrior" concept based on super hero TV shows such as Super Sentai and Sailor Moon.

== Release and promotion ==
The lead single, "FM", was first performed at K-Pop Night Out at SXSW in Austin, Texas on March 19. After returning to Seoul, Crayon Pop had a street showcase in Dongdaemun District on March 21, followed by guerrilla performances in Myeong-dong, COEX and Hongdae. Promotion for the album began on March 26 on the music show M! Countdown.

The album was released on March 27 and has three songs. "FM", written by Shinsadong Tiger and Monster Factory, was described as a "catchy song with mysterious lyrics and rhythmical melody". "FM" stands for "field manual" and is slang for someone who is a rule follower, but not in a good way. In an interview with MTV, Ellin discussed the concept of "FM": "Unlike the cute image from 'Bar Bar Bar', we are portraying the image of a charismatic female warrior; we are mature women."

"Hapataka" is written by Kim Yoo-min (who also wrote "Bar Bar Bar") and is a "mix of dance and punk sounds along with lyrics that flip the Korean alphabets backwards". "1, 2, 3, 4" is written by Song Ji-hoon of Dumb & Dumber, the producer team behind Crayon Pop's first three singles. "1, 2, 3, 4" had previously been recorded and performed in both Japanese and English, and a Korean version was recorded for the album.

== Music video ==
The music video for "FM" was filmed in a quarry in Hwaseong, Gyeonggi-do and has a "female warrior" concept inspired by Super Sentai and Sailor Moon. The music video is similar to a 1990s super hero TV show, with Crayon Pop transforming into super heroes and defeating a rat-like monster villain. BornUs of K-Much appears in the music video as Tuxedo Mask, Sailor Moon's love interest.

== Critical reception ==
"FM"
A sample of the song's chorus

Crayon Pop's performance of "FM" at the SXSW Music Festival was chosen by Fuse TV as one of the 18 best moments of the festival. Fuse writer Maria Sherman praised Crayon Pop's "phenomenal" choreography and said, "If these girls know anything, it's how to entertain." Adrienne Stanley of MTV said the song was one of the best K-pop concepts of 2015 due to the "incorporation of recognizable Asian pop iconography and the brilliant use of Crayon Pop's dance friendly vocals". She also commented on the group's "dynamic" choreography and "clever delivery of girl power".

Jeff Benjamin of Billboard called the song an "addictive dance single" with a "slight tinge of melancholy" and said the group's sound was more mature than their previous singles and "smoother and cooler to the ears". He also noted the song's similarity to T-ara's singles, with the chorus sounding like an upbeat version of "Day by Day". He concluded: "'FM' seems to show that Crayon Pop can and will still make entertaining visuals, but they're also capable of making music that can be taken seriously as they grow older too. Overall, it's a positive step forward in a difficult transition from viral sensation to legitimate music act."

Scott Interrante, writing for PopMatters, said "FM" was "incredible" and praised the retro superhero concept. He said, "At this point in their career, we've grown to be able to count on Crayon Pop for always coming out with something to cheer us up: something irreverent, silly, and astonishingly well-crafted and genuine". He also noted that the song was not as cheesy as past releases, but was campy enough to be "unmistakably Crayon Pop".

== Track listing ==
No.	Title	Lyrics	Music	Length
1.	"FM"	Shinsadong Tiger, Monster Factory	Shinsadong Tiger, Monster Factory	3:41
2.	"Hapataka" (하파타카)	Kim Yoo-min	Kim Yoo-min, Lee Seung-yeop, Lubomir Slavicek	3:08
3.	"1, 2, 3, 4"	Song Ji-hoon	Song Ji-hoon	3:06
4.	"FM" (Inst.)		Shinsadong Tiger, Monster Factory	3:41
5.	"Hapataka" (Inst.)		Kim Yoo-min, Lee Seung-yeop, Lubomir Slavicek	3:08
6.	"1, 2, 3, 4" (Inst.)		Song Ji-hoon	3:06
Total length:				19:50

== Charts ==
=== Weekly charts ===
Chart (2015)	Peak position
South Korea (Gaon Album Chart)	6
