= Uh-ee =

Single by Crayon Pop
- Released: April 1, 2014
- Recorded: 2014
- Genre: K-pop; house; trot; dance
- Length: 3:13
- Label: Chrome Entertainment; Sony Music
- Songwriter: Kang Jin Woo

Crayon Pop singles chronology
"Lonely Christmas" (2013)	"Uh-ee" (2014)	"FM" (2015)

Music video
- "Uh-ee" on YouTube

Audio sample
- "Uh-ee": file; help

"Uh-ee" (Korean: 어이) is the fourth single album, and sixth single overall by Crayon Pop. It was released on April 1, 2014, by Chrome Entertainment and Sony Music, and was written by Kang Jin Woo of Dumb & Dumber, the producers behind Crayon Pop's first three singles. The song is an electro house dance song mixed with trot music.

== Release and promotion ==
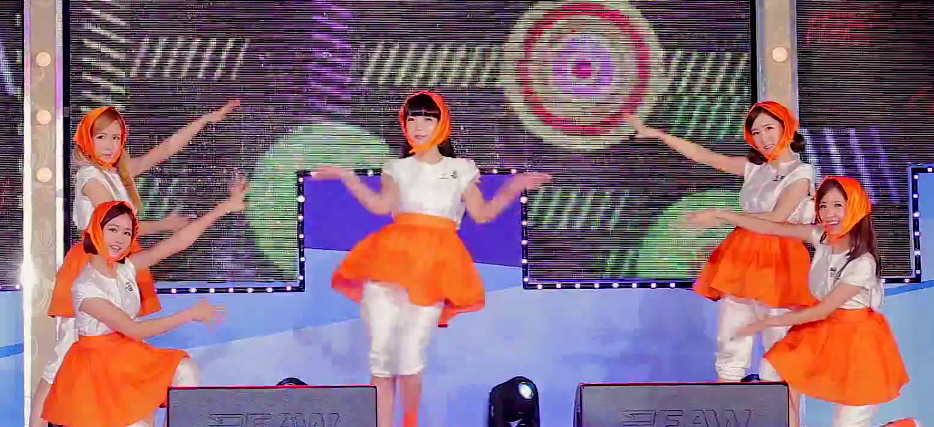
Crayon Pop performing "Uh-ee" on April 13, 2014

"Uh-ee" was performed for the first time on March 28 at a showcase at Olleh Square in Seoul. For the song's promotion, Crayon Pop wore hanbok-inspired clothing: outfits made of ramie cloth, bandanas, and gomusin (traditional rubber shoes). At the showcase, Choa said, "We really had tons of meetings at our agency to come up with our next costume concept for our latest single. During the last New Year holiday we all took pictures in our hanbok and we realized if it was modified a bit it could actually be quite comfortable to wear around all the time... so that was our inspiration."

The song was released on April 1, as both a CD single and a digital download. The accompanying music video was released the same day. Crayon Pop was featured on 1theK Originals' "Let's Dance" segment on April 2, where they showed the most notable points of their quirky choreography, including the "chicken leg" dance. The group then promoted the song on music shows, starting with Mnet's Global M! Countdown on April 3. The day before, "Uh-ee" was ruled unfit for broadcast by KBS because the lyrics contain the Japanese word for "shiny" (ぴかぴか pikapika). According to KBS, the word was "a vestige of Japanese imperialism". Crayon Pop re-recorded part of the song, and a modified version was submitted to KBS and later performed on Music Bank. "Uh-ee" was performed on music shows for two weeks before promotion prematurely ended due to the sinking of the MV Sewol.

== Music video ==
The music video features cameo appearances by Bumkey, DJ DOC's Kim Chang-ryeol, and comedian Yoon Sung-ho. All five members of K-Much, and Bob Girls' Dahye and Jina also appeared. The music video received more than one million views within one day of release, and has 10.6 million views as of May 2016. When the music video was released, it was still March 31 in many countries, and it received enough views to be number 8 in a list of most-viewed K-pop music videos in the United States for March 2014, as well as number 4 globally.

== Reception ==
Jeff Benjamin, writing for Billboard, described the song as having a "hyper-techno dance beat" that would fit into Dance Dance Revolution, while Jonathan Cheng of The Wall Street Journal, noted the song's "almost frenetic backbeat" and difficult dance routine. Writing for Fuse, Benjamin said the high-energy dance routine "blew our minds" and it was "equal parts legit choreography and sillylicious dance moves". It was fourth on Fuse's list of "13 K-Pop Videos With the Most Eye-Popping Choreography".

Scott Interrante of PopMatters called Crayon Pop a "unique phenomenon" because of their "overly cheesy, kinda satirical, and insanely fun" songs and videos. He described "Uh-ee" as a "high-energy, manic dance song with aggressive vocals, corny synths, and its catchiest chorus to date". He also noted the "silly but highly calculated dance routine" in the music video. At the end of the year, he ranked the song twelfth on his list of "The Best K-pop of 2014".

== Track listing ==
All tracks are written by Kang Jin-woo.

Tracklist
No.	Title	Length
1.	"Uh-ee" (어이)	3:13
2.	"Uh-ee (Inst.)"	3:13
Total length:		6:26

== Credits and personnel ==
- Hwang Hyun-chang – executive producer
- Lee Seong-yeon – co-producer
- Kang Jin-woo – music producer, songwriter, vocal director, recording engineer
- Choa – chorus
- Hong Seong-jun at Hongsound Mix Lab – mix engineer
- Kim Gwang-min at Hongsound Mix Lab – mix assistant
- Choi Hyo-yeong at Suono Mastering – mastering engineer
- Ju Jang-il, Lee Yun-seo – art direction and design
- Jang Won-seok – photography
- Lee Seul-gi, Ryu Song-hwa, Kim Eun-ji, Lee Go-eun – Chrome art team
- Lee Jae-seok (Allcheng) – illustrator

Credits and personnel adapted from the album's liner notes.

== Charts ==
=== Single charts ===
Country	Chart	Peak position
South Korea	Billboard K-Pop Hot 100	8
South Korea	Gaon Digital Chart (weekly)	10
South Korea	Gaon Digital Chart (monthly)	19
South Korea	Gaon Digital Chart (mid-year)	91
South Korea	Gaon Mobile Chart	2
South Korea	Gaon Social Chart	1
United States	Billboard World Digital Songs	15

=== Album chart ===
Country	Chart	Peak position
South Korea (Gaon Music Chart)	Album Chart (weekly)	9
South Korea (Gaon Music Chart)	Album Chart (monthly)	28
South Korea (Gaon Music Chart)	Album Chart (mid-year)	85

=== Sales and certifications ===
Chart	Sales
Gaon physical sales	5,742+
Gaon digital sales	380,845+

== Release history ==
Country	Date	Format	Label
Worldwide	April 1, 2014	Digital download	Chrome Entertainment, Sony Music
South Korea	April 2, 2014	CD single	Chrome Entertainment, Sony Music
Taiwan	April 29, 2014	CD single	Chrome Entertainment, Sony Music
