= Chrome Entertainment =

South Korean record label and talent agency

- Native name: 크롬 엔터테인먼트
- Industry: Music; Entertainment
- Genre: Trot; K-pop; dance; electropop
- Founded: Seoul, South Korea (August 2011)
- Founder: Hwang Hyun-chang
- Headquarters: 222-2 kingreon building B1, Nonhyeon-dong, Gangnam District, Seoul, South Korea
- Key people: Kim Jeong-tae (CEO)
- Products: Albums; Concerts
- Services: Publishing records Entertainment agency
- Website: www.chrome-ent.co.kr

Chrome Entertainment is a record label and talent agency founded by Hwang Hyun-chang in 2011, based in Seoul, South Korea. Since 2014, Chrome Entertainment is a label under Sony Music Entertainment.

== History ==
Hwang Hyun-chang, a commercial photographer, was inspired to create a girl group after seeing T-ara's "Roly Poly" on television. Before that, he had never paid attention to pop idols and only listened to classical music. After an initial investment of 10 million won, he converted his photography studio, Chrome Creative, into Chrome Entertainment. To finance this venture, Hwang sold his camera gear, used up all his savings, and went into debt. He later said, "If I had known how much it would cost, I would never have done it."

The first group that Chrome Entertainment formed and managed was Crayon Pop, who debuted in July 2012. After the success of Crayon Pop's "Bar Bar Bar", which earned the company US$2 million, Chrome was able to debut more groups. Boy band K-Much debuted in January 2014, and two more groups debuted in June 2014: girl group Bob Girls and male duo Zan Zan (짠짠). On 2 December 2014, male trot singer Her Min-young signed a contract with Chrome Entertainment. On February 24, 2015, it was announced that Bob Girls had disbanded. Later that year, Zan Zan and Her Min-young left the agency.

In 2016, Chrome Entertainment had major changes in management, with founder Hwang Hyun-chang leaving the agency. Kim Jeong-tae replaced him as CEO.

== Partnership with Sony Music ==
On 13 August 2013, Chrome Entertainment signed a strategic partnership contract with Sony Music Entertainment, which gave Sony international distribution rights to Chrome's music and albums. On 7 July 2014, Chrome Entertainment signed a label contract which made Chrome an independent label under Sony Music Entertainment. With this new contract, Chrome has the ability to distribute music from other agencies. In August 2014, it was reported that K-pop trio Lip Service had signed a contract with Chrome Entertainment. The company was subsequently credited under "manufacture" (as Chrome Entertainment Sony Music) on Lip Service's single album, Upgrade, released 20 August 2014.

== Concerts ==
Chrome Entertainment has held several concerts for their artists. The first such concert was on 21 June 2014, called Chrome Happy Concert in Cheongju. On 4 October, the First Chrome Family in Japan Concert was held in Shinagawa, Tokyo. On 3 December, Chrome Family released a single album, 2014 Chrome Family – A Very Special Christmas, with the single "Love Christmas".

== Artists ==
=== Recording artists ===
- Bz-Boys

=== Actors ===
- Cho Hyung-joon
- Lee Geun-hwa
- Lee Ho-suck

== Former artists ==
- Loki (K-Much, 2014)
- Bob Girls (2014–2015)
- Zan Zan (2014–2015)
- Her Min-young (2014–2015)
- Crayon Pop (2012–2017)
- Be.A (2014–2018)

== Discography ==
Title	Artist	Released	Type	Distributor
Crayon Pop 1st Mini Album	Crayon Pop	18 July 2012	EP	CJ E&M Music (2012–2013); Sony Music (2013–present)
"Dancing Queen"	Crayon Pop	24 October 2012	Single	CJ E&M Music (2012–2013); Sony Music (2013–present)
"Bar Bar Bar"	Crayon Pop	20 June 2013	Single	CJ E&M Music (2012–2013); Sony Music (2013–present)
The Streets Go Disco	Crayon Pop	26 September 2013	EP	Sony Music
"Lonely Christmas"	Crayon Pop	26 November 2013	Single	Sony Music
Beyond the Ocean	K-Much	7 January 2014	EP	Sony Music
"Hero"	Crayon Pop (with Kim Jang-hoon)	3 February 2014	Single	Sony Music
"What Should I Do" (Remix)	K-Much	17 February 2014	Single	Sony Music
"Uh-ee"	Crayon Pop	1 April 2014	Single	Sony Music
The 1st Single Album	Bob Girls	10 June 2014	Single	Sony Music
"Chicken Feet" (닭발)	Zan Zan	16 June 2014	Single	Sony Music
"Hey Mister" (Trot Lovers OST Part 1)	Crayon Pop	20 June 2014	Single	Sony Music
Summer Repackage	Bob Girls	31 July 2014	Single	Sony Music
"C'mon C'mon" (High School: Love On OST Part 5)	Crayon Pop	26 September 2014	Single	LOEN Entertainment
The 1st Mini Album	Strawberry Milk	15 October 2014	EP	Sony Music
Pop! Pop! Pop!	Crayon Pop	19 November 2014	EP	Pony Canyon
2014 Chrome Family – A Very Special Christmas	Chrome Family	3 December 2014	Single	Sony Music
"Y-Shirt"	Soyul	12 January 2015	Single	LOEN Entertainment
"December 24"	K-Much	17 February 2015	Single	Sony Music
"On the Hook"	K-Much	6 March 2015	Single	Sony Music
FM	Crayon Pop	27 March 2015	EP	Sony Music
The 1st Single Album	Her Min-young	7 April 2015	Single	Sony Music
Zan Zan 2nd Single Album	Zan Zan	25 June 2015	Single	
Crayon Pop	Crayon Pop	20 January 2016	Studio album	Pony Canyon
Evolution Pop Vol. 1	Crayon Pop	26 September 2016	Studio album	Sony Music
Magical Realism	Be.A	25 May 2017	Extended play	Sony Music
