= Crayon Pop =

South Korean girl group

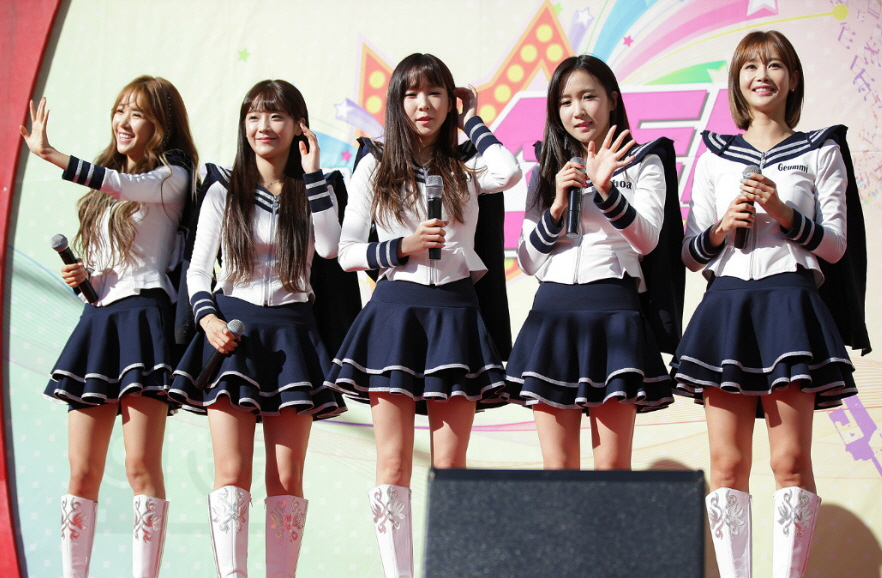
- Crayon Pop in October 2015 from left to right: Ellin, Soyul (former), Way, Choa, Geummi

Background information
- Origin: Uijeongbu, South Korea
- Genres: K-pop; trot; nu-disco; dance-pop
- Years active: 2012–2019
- Labels: Chrome; Sony Music; Pony Canyon
- Spinoffs: Strawberry Milk
- Past members: Geummi; Ellin; Choa; Way; Soyul

Crayon Pop (Korean: 크레용팝) were a South Korean girl group formed under Chrome Entertainment in 2012. The group consisted of five members: Geummi, Ellin, Choa, Way and Soyul.

Crayon Pop officially debuted in July 2012 with their performance of "Saturday Night" on Mnet's M! Countdown. Their first EP was not a commercial success, and when their song "Dancing Queen" was released in October, the group had few opportunities to promote on music shows. Instead they held guerrilla performances on the streets of Seoul, which helped increase their fanbase. Crayon Pop gained a huge increase in popularity following the release of their single album "Bar Bar Bar" in June 2013. The group's unique stage outfits and choreography gained public attention, and made the title song a viral hit. It eventually managed to reach number 1 on Billboard's K-Pop Hot 100. Crayon Pop was able to earn numerous awards, including the New Rising Star Award at the Golden Disk Awards, the Hot Trend Award at the MelOn Music Awards, and Best New Female Artist at the Mnet Asian Music Awards.

The group has held solo concerts in South Korea, Japan and Taiwan, and has also performed in other countries including Australia and China. Throughout June and July 2014, the group was an opening act Lady Gaga's ArtRave: The Artpop Ball concert tour. Crayon Pop performed for it in 12 cities around the United States and Canada. Following their appearance in the Artpop tour, the group debuted their first subunit in October. The unit is named Strawberry Milk, and consists of the twin members Choa and Way. In March 2015, Crayon Pop released their second mini album FM, for which they used Super Sentai inspired costumes.

They released the song "RaRiRuRe" in June of that same year, which was their debut in the Japanese music market. The group continued their Japanese promotions with their second single "Dancing All Night" in November. Their first Japanese studio album Crayon Pop was released January 2016, and it ranked #11 on Oricon's Daily Album Charts. Crayon Pop collaborated with Mexican boy band CD9 in August, to release the song "Get Dumb". In September, Crayon Pop released the song "Vroom Vroom" ahead of their first album Crayon Pop Evolution Pop Vol. 1. They soon released the music video for "Doo Doom Chit", another song that would feature on the track list of the album.

On 19 April 2017, the group announced their contracts with Chrome Media had ended in March and they had gone their separate ways, although they would not be officially disbanding. On 30 May, it was revealed that Way, Choa, Geummi and Ellin would continue to promote as Crayon Pop under Chrome Entertainment, but Soyul had chosen to leave the group.

Choa and Way released a digital single called My Univese in September 2019. No further music associated with Crayon Pop has ever been released.

== History ==
=== Pre-debut ===
The group was initially named Hurricane Pop, and consisted of members Serang (Yang Se-hyeon), Geummi (Baek Bo-ram), Ellin (Kim Min-young), Choa (Heo Min-jin), and Soyul (Park Hye-kyeong). Chrome Entertainment's CEO, Hwang Hyun-chang, did not consider candidates who were taller than 165 cm or had a sexy image, because he wanted a group of ordinary girls. Soyul was the first member to be accepted, and Geummi was the next to join. Serang, under the name Mari, had formerly been the leader of the disbanded girl group Coin Jackson. Ellin was referred to Chrome Entertainment by Chrome's dance choreographer and was accepted after her third audition. Choa was recommended to the company by Way, her twin sister. Way had been invited to audition, but was unable to do so because she was a member of the indie band N.Dolphin. Singer Bumkey was involved in the audition process and also supervised the group's vocal training.

The group recorded their first song 'Bing Bing' as Hurricane Pop. In January 2012, they performed the song live for the first time in Hangzhou, China. The performance of "Bing Bing" was filmed for the Chinese television drama Curry Campus. A music video for their song was filmed in February, but Serang left the group in May to pursue an acting career. After Serang's departure, Way was given another chance to join the group and she left N.Dolphin. Shortly before their debut the group's name was changed to Crayon Pop, as Chrome Entertainment thought the name Hurricane Pop would be insensitive in light of Japan's tsunamis. The members' stage names were chosen by the company's CEO, although several of them had input into the choice.

=== 2012: Debut with Crayon Pop 1st Mini Album and Dancing Queen ===
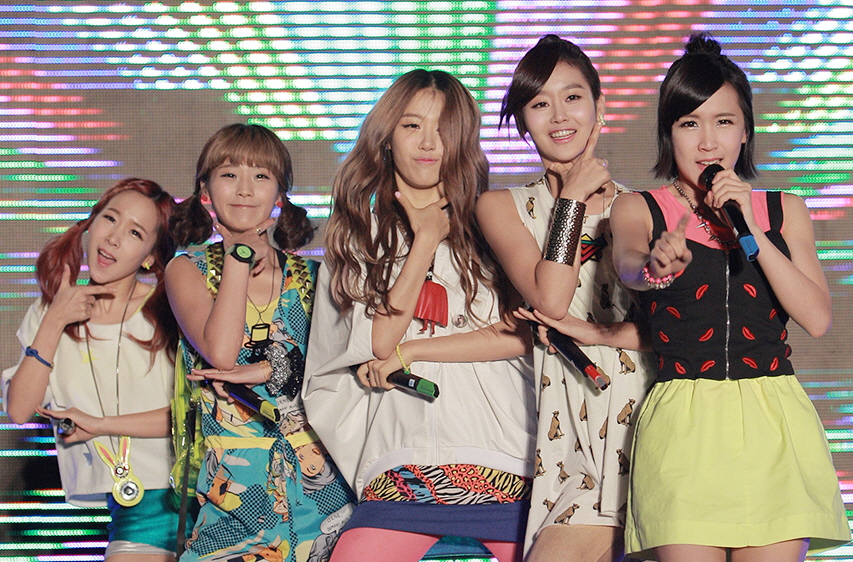
Crayon Pop performing "Saturday Night" in September 2012

Crayon Pop began their promotions in Japan in May 2012, using their time there to film music videos for "Bing Bing". The group released both the Korean and Japanese music videos in June. The music video for their debut single "Saturday Night" was released on 17 July, followed by a Japanese version, as well as an alternate version with new footage, on 24 July. Crayon Pop's first EP, Crayon Pop 1st Mini Album, was released digitally on 18 July and included both "Bing Bing" and "Saturday Night". The group made their official stage debut the following day on 19 July, performing "Saturday Night" on Mnet's M! Countdown. Crayon Pop's debut did not receive much attention and their album was not commercially successful. Chrome Entertainment's CEO later revealed that the album had depleted all the company's money.

Crayon Pop released a digital single album, "Dancing Queen", on 24 October 2012. Besides the title track, it also included a remixed version of "Bing Bing". In order to stand out from other girl groups, Crayon Pop wore tracksuits instead of more feminine clothing. After seeing a performance of "Dancing Queen", Kangin and Shindong of Super Junior praised the song and group, with Shindong saying "I'd love to produce a girl group like them". Crayon Pop was only invited to perform on music shows three times, and they were not able to have a typical promotion cycle. As a result, they took to the streets and promoted "Dancing Queen" with guerrilla performances, which often took place in extremely cold weather. Chrome Entertainment also produced a reality web series about the group, titled Crayon Pop TV. Through these activities, Crayon Pop developed a loyal fanbase, especially of "uncle fans" called "Pop-jeossi" (from the Korean word ajeossi).

=== 2013: Success in Japan, "Bar Bar Bar" and rising popularity ===
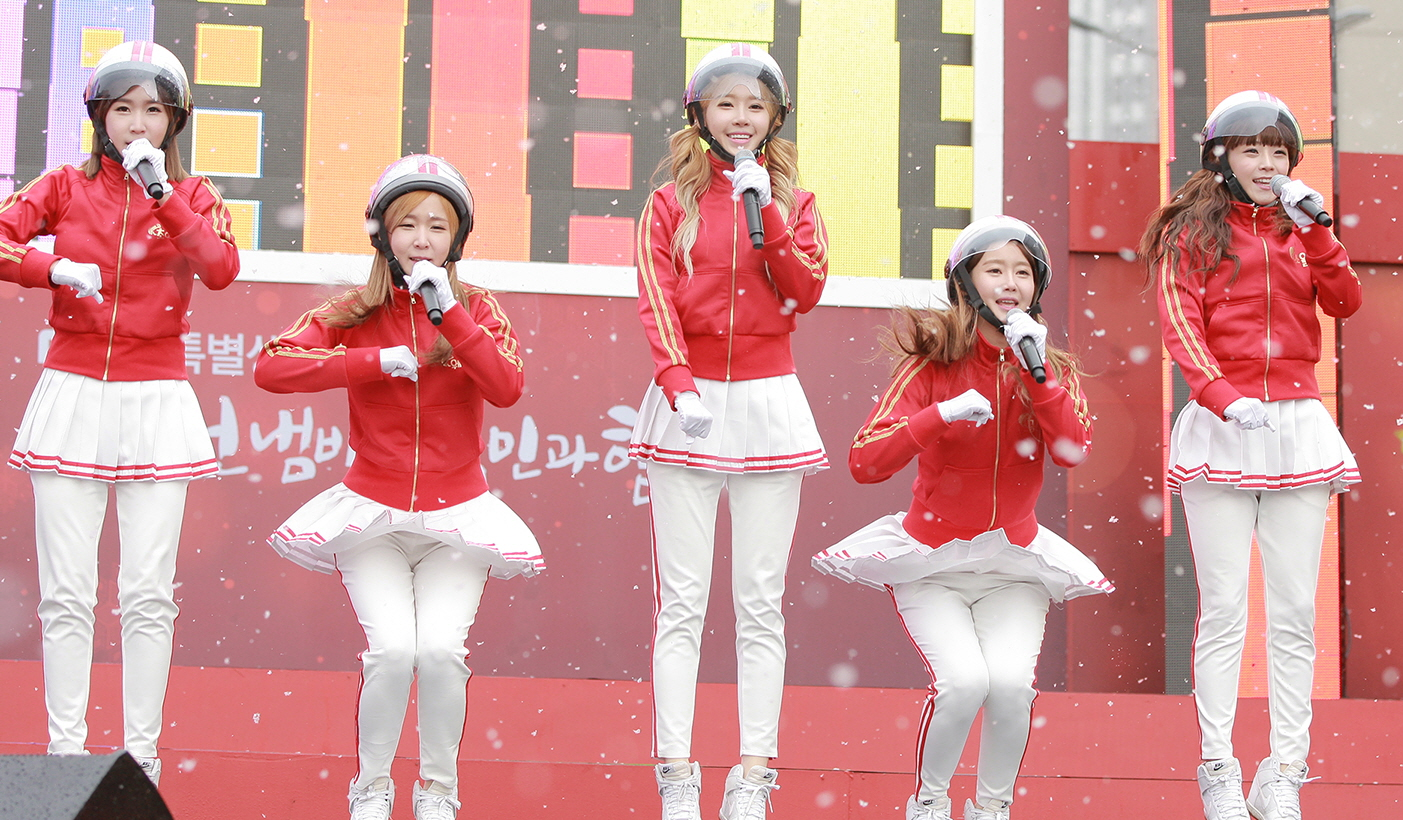
Crayon Pop performing "Bar Bar Bar" in December 2013

Crayon Pop returned to Japan and held a mini-concert on 6 January 2013 in Shibuya, Tokyo. Tickets went on sale on 11 December 2012, and sold out in less than an hour. As a result of considerable demand from fans unable to purchase tickets, Chrome Entertainment announced that another Japanese concert would be held at a later date, and a second mini-concert was staged in Osaka on 22 February. On 25 January, Crayon Pop began promoting the remixed version of "Bing Bing", which included a popping dance break to Daft Punk's "Harder, Better, Faster, Stronger" instead of the original rap verse. They had a "delinquent schoolgirl" concept with new choreography, and wore tracksuits or school uniforms with tracksuit pants. On 19 May, a third Japanese mini-concert was held in Shibuya, Tokyo. A new Japanese member, Arisa, was to be revealed at this concert, but she had withdrawn from the group before the performance.

On 8 June, Crayon Pop performed a preview version of their new song "Bar Bar Bar". The unusual dance featured choreographed jumping, and they wore scooter helmets, polo shirts, and tracksuit pants with skirts. A story version music video was released on 13 June, a week before the song's digital release on 20 June. Three days later, a dance version music video was released. Filmed with a budget of only 380,000 won (US$347), the music video went viral and Crayon Pop drew interest due to their unique stage outfits and choreography. This music video has more than 64 million views on YouTube as of March 2021.

As "Bar Bar Bar" went viral, it began to climb the Korean digital music charts, eventually reaching the upper positions of most major real time chart listings. It stayed at the top of Billboard's Korea K-Pop Hot 100 chart for more than a month, and ranked number 1 for the first time eight weeks after release. "Bar Bar Bar" solidified its viral status when a parody video was aired on a segment of SNL Korea on 13 August. That same day, it was announced that Crayon Pop had signed a contract with Sony Music Entertainment, who were inspired by the groups' creativity and uniqueness and saw their global market potential. Crayon Pop scored their first music show win when "Bar Bar Bar" won first place on Music Bank on 30 August, beating EXO's "Growl". On 9 September, a "Global Version" music video was released ahead of Crayon Pop's second mini album, The Streets Go Disco, which was released on 26 September under the Sony Music label. This album consisted of their four previous singles and remixes of those songs. A music video for the title track, "Dancing Queen 2.0", was released along with the album. "Bar Bar Bar" earned Chrome Entertainment US$2 million in the year after its release, and Crayon Pop was able to move from their small row house in Nonhyeon-dong to a luxury "villa" apartment due to their increased income.

Crayon Pop's rising popularity also brought them criticism. Netizens accused the group of being affiliated with the right-wing website Ilbe after Way used the phrase nomu nomu (노무노무) on Twitter. This phrase was popularized on Ilbe and was used to criticize former president Roh Moo-hyun. It was then discovered that Chrome Entertainment's CEO previously mentioned the website on Twitter. CEO Hwang responded by saying he was registered on many popular online communities, including Ilbe, in order to gather information about singers and girl groups. He also stated that Way's phrase was an example of aegyo and she was not even aware of the website. However, the controversy continued and several of the group's scheduled events were cancelled after criticism from the public. Online auction company Auction stopped broadcasting its new TV commercial featuring Crayon Pop after widespread customer complaints. The controversy resurfaced in January 2014 after Ellin allegedly used the Ilbe hand sign, but Chrome Entertainment explained that Ellin was forming the letter "E" with her hand, and all the Crayon Pop members have alphabet hand signs that signify their names.

Due to Crayon Pop's increased popularity, they had more opportunities to perform. On 27 July, they held their first mini-concert in South Korea. The group first performed in China on 9 August at the 23rd Qingdao International Beer Festival, and they performed in the United States for the first time at KCON on 25 August. On 30 October, Crayon Pop held a solo concert titled 1st POPCON in Seoul. As a token of appreciation, the concert was free to attend and 100%, My Name, Bumkey and The SeeYa appeared as special guests. The concert was broadcast on MBC Music on 12 November. Crayon Pop held another solo concert, 2nd POPCON in Tokyo, on 15 November at Zepp DiverCity, Tokyo with more than 2,000 fans, 30 media outlets, and 200 representatives in the music industry in attendance. In November, Sony Music sponsored a week-long trip to Sydney, Australia, where the group held two performances and fan signing events. They also appeared on several Australian TV shows, including SBS PopAsia, and did a guerrilla performance in front of the Sydney Opera House.

On 22 November, Crayon Pop collaborated with Norwegian duo, Ylvis, to perform a special stage at the Mnet Asian Music Awards in Hong Kong. Crayon Pop received their first major award, Best New Female Artist, while Ylvis won the International Favorite Artist award. Crayon Pop received many other awards throughout the awards season, including the Hot Trend Award at the MelOn Music Awards, Artist of the Year on KBS Song Festival, New Rising Star at the Golden Disk Awards, the New Artist Award at the Seoul Music Awards, and the Hot Trend Award at the Gaon Chart K-Pop Awards.

Crayon Pop released a Christmas single, "Lonely Christmas", on 26 November. The music video was released on 1 December and featured costumes designed by Gu Donghyun on OnStyle's Fashion Killa. They had their comeback stage on M! Countdown on 5 December, and promotion continued through the end of the month. The song peaked at number 12 on the Gaon Digital Chart and was number 1 on the Social Chart for four weeks in a row.

=== 2014: Uh-ee and Lady Gaga tour ===
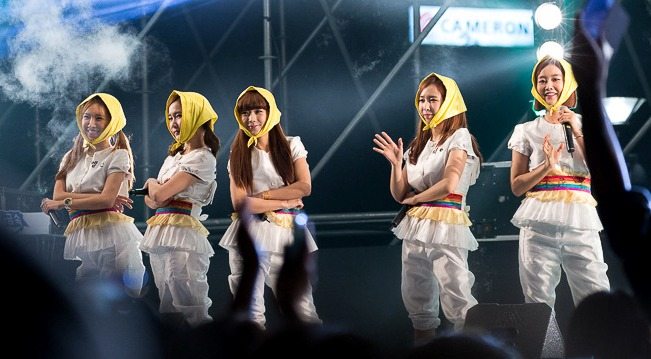
Crayon Pop in August 2014

On 5 February, Crayon Pop and rock singer Kim Jang-hoon released "Hero" for the Korea Firefighters Project. The entire profits of the song were donated to the families of firefighters who had died in the line of duty. Crayon Pop and Kim Jang-hoon (called "Cray-Hoon Pop") also held two free concerts, attended by 3,500 municipal officials, firefighters, and bereaved family members of firefighters.

Crayon Pop's sixth single, "Uh-ee", was released on 1 April. The music video had more than one million views on YouTube in one day, and featured cameos from DJ DOC's Kim Chang-ryeol, Bumkey, and comedian Yoon Sung-ho. The song is an electro house dance song mixed with trot music, and Crayon Pop wore hanbok-inspired clothing while performing. They began promoting the song on 3 April on Mnet's Global M! Countdown. The song peaked at number 8 on Billboard's K-Pop Hot 100 and number 10 on the Gaon Digital Chart before promotion prematurely ended due to the sinking of the motor vessel Sewol on 16 April.

On 20 June, Crayon Pop released their first soundtrack single, "Hey Mister", for the television drama Trot Lovers. The disco-pop dance track played during the closing credits of the drama. Choa made her acting debut in High School: Love On in July, and on 26 September, Crayon Pop released the single "C'mon C'mon" for the drama's soundtrack. Earlier in the year, they had recorded a Korean-language version of "Everything Is Awesome" for the Korean dub of The Lego Movie, which was released theatrically in South Korea on 6 February.

Crayon Pop performed in various countries throughout the year. They were the opening act for Hunan TV's Lantern Festival Program on 14 February, marking their debut on a television show in Mainland China. On 23 March, Crayon Pop held their first fan meeting in Hong Kong, which was attended by more than 1,000 fans and more than 70 media outlets. On 3 May, Crayon Pop returned to the United States and performed at the Korean Music Festival in Los Angeles. The group performed in Indonesia for the first time on 2 June at the Asian Dream Cup in Jakarta. On 21 June, they performed at Chrome Entertainment's concert titled Chrome Happy Concert in Cheongju. On 24 August, Crayon Pop held their first mini-concert in Taiwan at the Taipei International Convention Center, with more than 1,200 people in attendance. On 16 November, the group performed at the Pop Idol 2014 Asian Performing Arts Awards Concert in Shanghai, China, to an audience of more than 80,000 people.

From 26 June to 22 July, the group was the opening act for Lady Gaga's ArtRave: The Artpop Ball concert tour in Milwaukee, Atlantic City, Boston, Montreal, Buffalo, Toronto, Chicago, San Antonio, Houston, Dallas, Las Vegas and Los Angeles. They were the second Korean act to perform as an opening act for Lady Gaga, the first being Lee Jung-hyun in 2009. Lady Gaga had asked Crayon Pop to open all 29 concerts in North America, but they only agreed to one month because they needed to work on their first full-length album. For each of the thirteen concerts, they were on stage for thirty minutes and performed all six of their singles. On 11 July, while in Chicago, Crayon Pop performed "Bar Bar Bar" on the WGN Morning News. On 22 July, Crayon Pop held a fan meeting in Los Angeles; this was their first fan meeting in the United States.

On 4 October, Crayon Pop took part in the First Chrome Family in Japan Concert in Shinagawa, Tokyo. At this concert, it was announced that Crayon Pop would make their Japanese debut in 2015. On 7 October, it was announced that Crayon Pop had signed with Japanese record label Pony Canyon, and a mini album, Pop! Pop! Pop!, was released in Japan on 19 November. The album includes three previously unreleased tracks: EDM remixes of "Bar Bar Bar" and "Uh-ee", and "Bbyong Song", a new song written by Song Ji Hoon of Dumb & Dumber. In its first week of release, the album ranked number 48 on the weekly Oricon Albums Chart. Crayon Pop held three mini-concerts in Toyosu and Shibuya, Tokyo on 6 December to promote the album.

In October, Crayon Pop was chosen as public relations ambassadors by the Asian Injury Prevention Foundation and Save the Children to help promote the 7% Project, a nationwide campaign in Thailand for increasing motorcycle helmet use among children. The highlight of the campaign was a mini-concert, Crayon Pop Live in Bangkok, held outside the Bangkok Art and Culture Centre on 23 November to an audience of more than 1,000 people. This concert officially launched the 7% Project and was Crayon Pop's first performance in Thailand. During their three-day stay in Bangkok, Crayon Pop also participated in a news conference about the campaign, attended by more than 50 media outlets, and appeared on Rueng Lao Chao Nee, the most popular morning television program in Thailand.

The first Chrome Family project, a single album titled 2014 Chrome Family – A Very Special Christmas, was released digitally on 3 December. The single, "Love Christmas", featured all the Chrome Entertainment artists, including Crayon Pop.

=== 2015: FM and Japanese debut ===
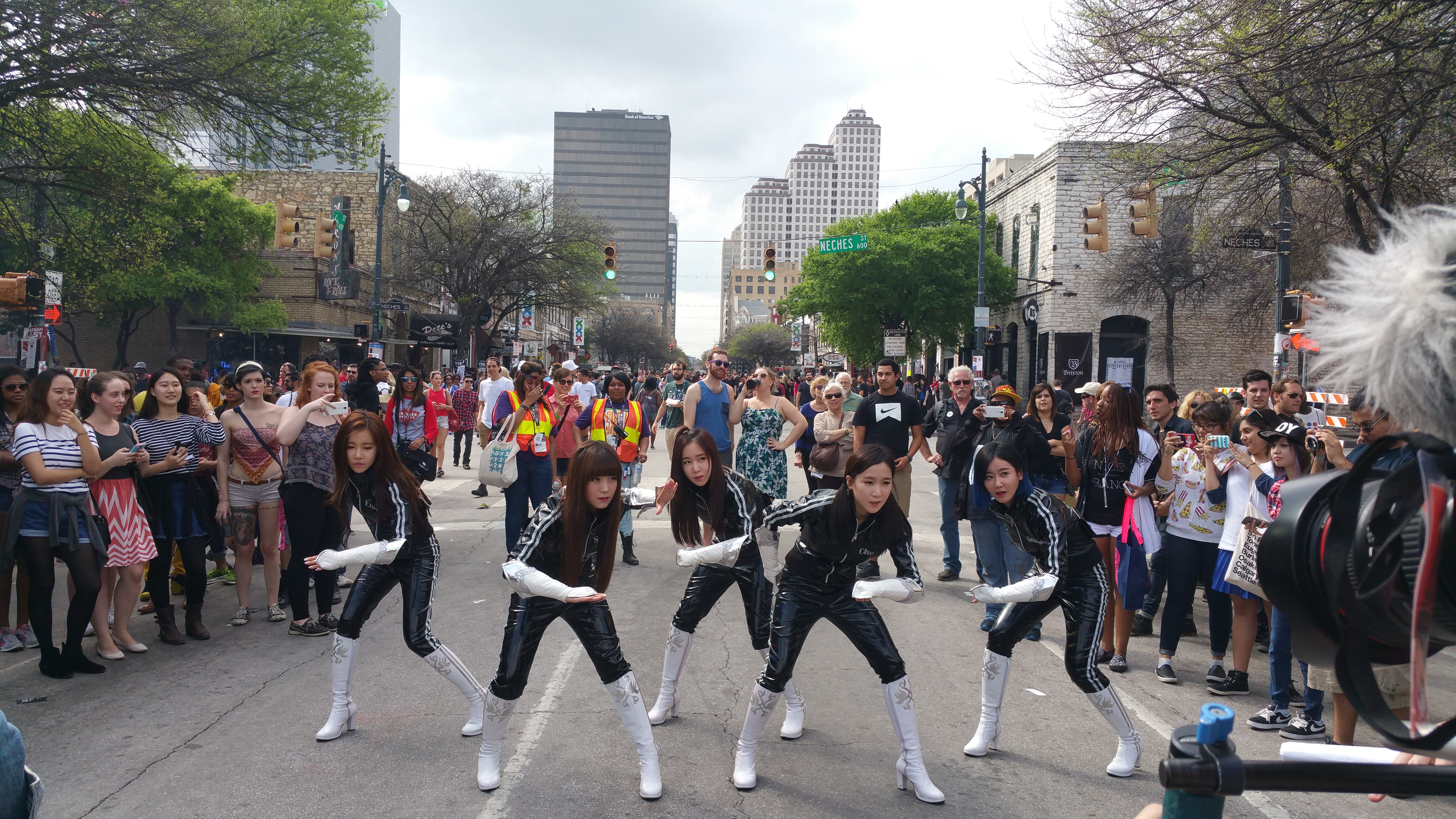
Crayon Pop filming "Can't Stop Crayon Pop" for Funny or Die before K-Pop Night Out at SXSW

On 22 January, the group released a song for Chinese New Year, "123 Happy New Year". The song was a collaboration with the Chinese boy group, DT Boys, and is Crayon Pop's first Chinese release. Crayon Pop's second mini album, FM was released on 27 March. The title track, "FM", was written by hitmaker Shinsadong Tiger and has a "female warrior" concept. The group first performed the song at K-Pop Night Out at SXSW in Austin, Texas on 19 March. After promotion ended for "FM", Crayon Pop released the single "Sup (Wassup)" (뭐해) featuring Robin Deiana. The single, released 4 May, was part 11 in the Artist Diary Project. In the 2015 Girl Group Rankings list created by Sports Chosun, Crayon Pop were found in the 'Popularity Maginot Line', with other well known groups such as T-ara and Dal Shabet.

The group's first Japanese single, titled "Rarirure" (ラリルレ), was released on 22 July the same year. The song debuted at #25 on the Oricon Charts A second Japanese single, "Dancing All Night", was released on 18 November and debuted at #17.

=== 2016–2019: Japanese promotions, first Korean album, group hiatus, Soyul's departure and reunion ===
Crayon Pop's first Japanese studio album was released on 20 January 2016. The album included their previous Japanese singles as well as Japanese versions of their Korean songs. Later that month, the group held concerts in Tokyo, Nagoya and Kobe as "Crayon Pop 1st Japan Tour 2016". The Nagoya concert was filmed and released on DVD as Pop in Japan on 16 March. Crayon Pop was featured on Mexican boy band CD9's single "Get Dumb", released on 24 August in two versions – English and "K-Mex" (Spanish and Korean).

On 7 September, their official YouTube channel released a teaser for their pre-release digital song 'Vroom Vroom', later fully releasing the song on the 9th. Before their official comeback, their company Chrome Entertainment announced their upcoming album would be a 'renewal', and that the members would play a large role in the process. The group released their first Korean studio album Evolution Pop Vol.1 with lead single "Doo Doom Chit" on 26 September. After a few weeks of promotion on various music shows, it was announced member Soyul would be on a short hiatus after developing anxiety disorder during the preparations for the album. The group continued promotions as 4. On 24 November, Soyul announced through her official Daum Cafe that she was engaged to ex-idol Moon Hee Jun. The sudden announcement gained much attention from the general public, and later it was announced that the two would wed in February 2017. Still as a group of four, Crayon Pop held an event named Winter Party on 19 February, which was co-hosted with Internet crowdfunding platform makestar.co and funded by the fans. Project participants were able to choose from several different sets of goods available for the respective amounts of money, although the donors who had pledged the equivalent of $860.90 were exclusively invited to participate in the event. Throughout the project's duration, a total of 323 contributors donated together $52,093.40.

On 1 February 2017, Chrome Entertainment released a statement discussing Crayon Pop's impending contract expirations, announcing their contracts would expire in March and they had previously not discussed the issue of re-signing with the company. On 19 April 2017, Chrome Entertainment released a statement about the groups' contracts, stating that they had expired, and the girls had gone their separate ways, with Choa and Way looking to sign with musical agencies, Geummi and Ellin "preparing for new activities" and Soyul remaining "on break" (due to her marriage to Moon Hee Jun). While disbandment was not confirmed, the members would be focusing on their solo careers, in effect putting the group on indefinite hiatus. Chrome Entertainment later released a statement contradicting this, saying Way's contract ended in May, not in March as previously stated.

On 8 May, it was confirmed that although both parties had repeatedly denied the rumours of a pregnancy and shotgun marriage, Soyul was pregnant and would be giving birth to a girl the same month.

On 31 May, an announcement was made that Geummi, Ellin, Choa and Way signed a non-exclusive contract under Chrome Entertainment to promote as Crayon Pop, however their solo careers would be managed by other labels. The statement specified that the group would be on a hiatus while the members worked on their solo careers. It was also revealed Soyul had withdrawn from the group to focus on her new family. In a separate statement, Chrome Entertainment wrote "Soyul in her current situation is dedicated to parenting, so Crayon Pop will act as a 4-member group, for the time being".

After news of Geummi's signing with Climix Entertainment on 26 September, Chrome Entertainment reiterated that Crayon Pop had not disbanded, and that while group activities would be managed by the company, solo activities would be handled by other companies the girls had signed with.

ChoA and Way released a digital single called My Universe in September 2019.

On 22 December 2019, Soyul, ChoA and Geummi were featured on Way's YouTube channel where they reacted to old Crayon Pop videos. All of them, with the exception of Ellin, were featured on KBS2's The Return of Superman, where Soyul's family are regular cast members.

== Musical style ==
Bar Bar Bar
A sample of the song's chorus

Crayon Pop's music is often described as electropop and disco-pop dance music with addictive and repetitive lyrics and melodies. Their first single, "Saturday Night", was a 1980s-inspired "electro-pop dance song with a retro melody". After the release of "Bar Bar Bar", Corynn Smith of MTV called Crayon Pop "a disco-pop K-Pop group that is obviously having a blast" with "bafflingly simple lyrics and unexpected choreography." Pops in Seoul described "Lonely Christmas" as "a dance song with funk and disco sounds", while Billboard magazine noted the song's catchy hook and energetic synths, trumpets and guitars.

Uh-ee
A sample of the song's chorus

Crayon Pop's sixth single, "Uh-ee", is a mix of electronic sounds and trot. Chrome Entertainment called the genre "house electronic trot" because it "is composed of fast beats and strong electronic sounds with addictive trot melody". Billboard described the song as having a hyper-techno dance beat that would fit into Dance Dance Revolution, while the dance routine was "more like an intense aerobic workout than a silly dance".

== Members ==
- Geummi (금미)
- Ellin (엘린)
- Choa (초아)
- Way (웨이)
- Soyul (소율)

== Subgroups ==
=== Strawberry Milk ===
Strawberry Milk (Korean: 딸기우유; RR: Ttalgiuyu) is Crayon Pop's first subgroup, featuring twins Choa and Way. Chrome Entertainment announced the subgroup (also called a unit or sub-unit) on 29 September 2014. Their debut album, The 1st Mini Album, was released on 15 October, along with a music video for the title track, "OK". Another song on the album, "Let Me Know", was written by Way. The lyrics are based on the twins' struggle to become singers.

In April 2015, Choa and Way were featured on Kim Yoo-min's "Road" (길), the lead single from his debut mini album (released under the stage name, Bear Planet). The sisters also played two of the lead roles in the music video. On 13 January 2016, the sisters released the single "I Hate You" (나가 미워). On 2 July, they released the single "Always" (늘) for the soundtrack of the television drama Mirror of the Witch.

In 2017, both Choa and Way started a YouTube vlogging channel, which the two would share together and post regularly. At the beginning of December, it was announced via the twins' Instagram accounts that they would release a Christmas duet titled 'Christmas For You' on the 16th of that month.

On 5 September 2019 they released "My Universe" as Choa & Way, not Strawberry Milk.

== Tours and festivals ==
=== Headlining Tours ===
- POPCON Tour (2013)

| Date | City | Country | Venue |
|---|---|---|---|
| October 30 | Seoul | South Korea | Nuridream Square |
| November 15 | Tokyo | Japan | Zepp Diver City |

=== Opening Act ===
- ArtRave: The ArtPop Ball (2014)

| Date | City | Country | Venue |
|---|---|---|---|
| June 26 | Milwaukee | United States | Marcus Amphitheater |
| June 28 | Atlantic City | United States | Boardwalk Hall |
| June 30 | Boston | United States | TD Garden |
| July 2 | Montreal | Canada | Bell Centre |
| July 7 | Buffalo | United States | First Niagara Center |
| July 9 | Toronto | Canada | Air Canada Centre |
| July 11 | Chicago | United States | United Center |
| July 14 | San Antonio | United States | AT&T Center |
| July 16 | Houston | United States | Toyota Center |
| July 17 | Dallas | United States | American Airlines Center |
| July 19 | Las Vegas | United States | MGM Grand Garden Arena |
| July 21 | Los Angeles | United States | Staples Center |
| July 22 | Los Angeles | United States | Staples Center |

=== Festivals ===
2013
| Date | City | Country | Festival |
|---|---|---|---|
| August 9 | Qingdao | China | 23rd Qingdao International Beer Festival |
| August 25 | Los Angeles | United States | KCON |
2014
| Date | City | Country | Festival |
| February 14 | Hunan | China | Hunan TV’s Lantern Festival Program |
| May 3 | Los Angeles | United States | LA Korean Music Festival |
| June 2 | Jakarta | Indonesia | Asian Dream Cup |
| November 16 | Shanghai | China | Pop Idol Asian Performing Arts Awards |
2015
| Date | City | Country | Festival |
| March 19 | Austin | United States | K-Pop Night Out at SXSW |

== Discography ==
- Crayon Pop (2016)
- Evolution Pop Vol. 1 (2016)

== Filmography ==
=== Television shows ===
| Year | Network | Title | Note | Ref. |
|---|---|---|---|---|
| 2012 | MBC Music | Crayon Pop's Colorful Growth Diary (크레용팝의 알록달록 성장일기) | 3 episodes | |
| 2014 | MBC | Crayon Pop's Fun Fun Tour (크레용팝의 뻔뻔한 여행) | 4 episodes; filmed in Ant Village, Gangwan-do | |

=== Web series ===
| Year | Distributor | Title | Note | Ref. |
|---|---|---|---|---|
| 2012–2013 | Chrome Entertainment (Crayon Pop YouTube) | Crayon Pop TV – Season 1 | 10 episodes | |
| 2013–2014 | Chrome Entertainment (Crayon Pop YouTube) | Crayon Pop TV – Season 2 | 10 episodes | |
| 2014 | Chrome Entertainment (Crayon Pop YouTube) | Crayon Pop TV – Season 3 | 1 episode | |
| 2014–2015 | Chrome Entertainment (YouTube) | Chrome-In – Season 1 | 10 episodes; with K-Much, Bob Girls, Zan Zan | |
| 2015 | Youku | Hallyu Star Traces (韩流行星轨迹) | 4 episodes | |

== See also ==
- List of awards and nominations received by Crayon Pop
