= List of awards and nominations received by Crayon Pop =

Crayon Pop awards and nominations
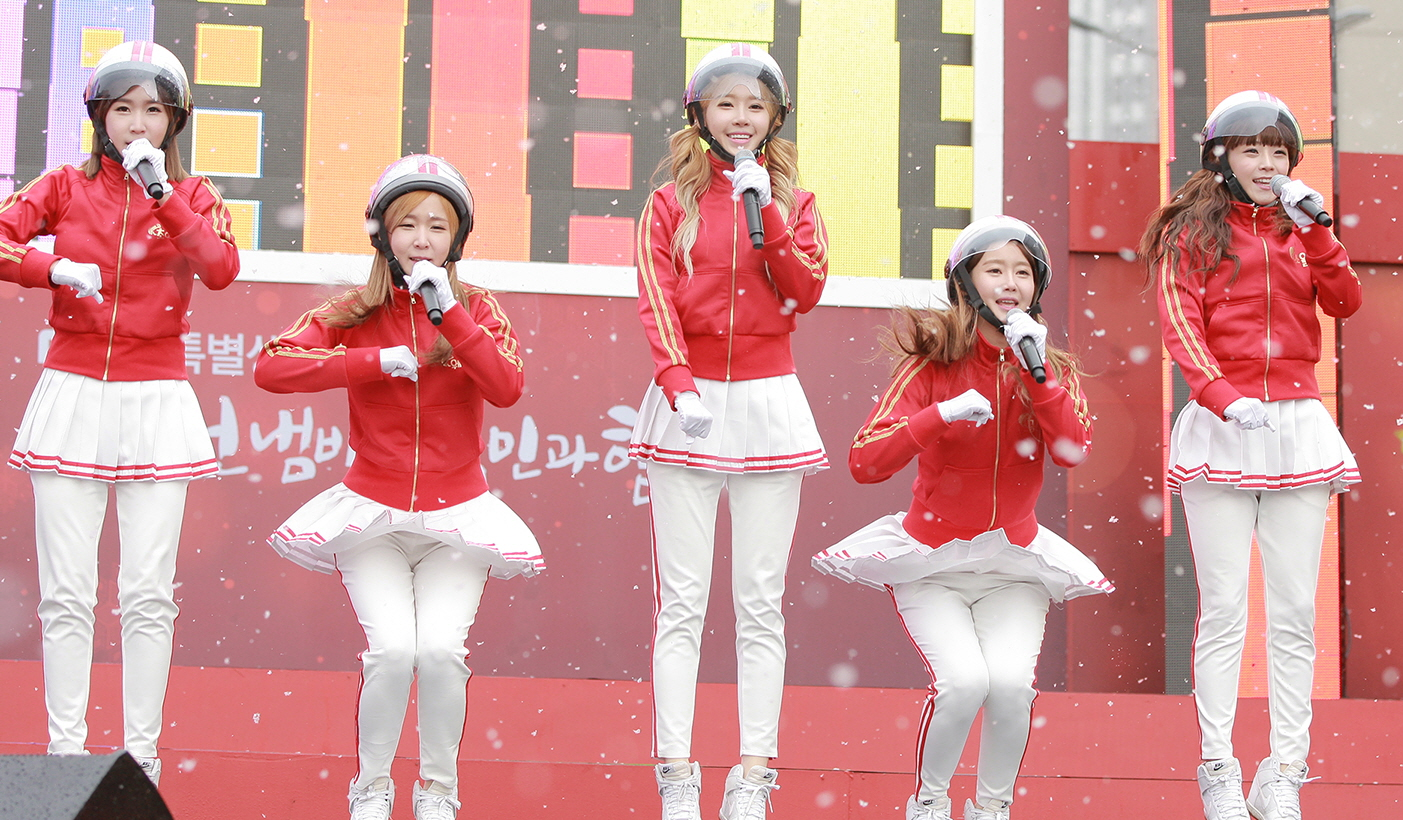
- Crayon Pop in December 2013.
Awards and nominations
Award	Wins	Nominations
Circle Chart Music	1	0
Golden Disc	1	1
MAMA	1	3
Melon Music	1	1
Seoul Music	1	2
Korean Music Awards	0	3
KBS Gayo Daechukje	1	0
Style Icon Awards	1	0
Korea Cultural Entertainment Awards	1	0
Hawaii International Music Award Festival (HIMAF)	1	0
Korea Wave Awards	1	0
Asia Model Festival Awards	1	0
Singapore Entertainment Awards	0	1
Seoul Foreign Correspondents' Club Awards	1	0
Seoul International Youth Film Festival	0	1
MTV IGGY's	1	0

Totals (Note: Certain award groups do not simply award one winner. They acknowledge several different recipients, have runners-up, and have third place. Since this is a specific recognition and is different from losing an award, runner-up mentions are considered wins in this award tally. For simplification and to avoid errors, each award in this list has been presumed to have had a prior nomination.)
- Wins: 13
- Nominations: 12

The following is a list of awards and nominations received by South Korean girl group Crayon Pop.

== Awards and nominations ==
=== Gaon Chart K-Pop Awards ===
Year	Category	Recipient	Result
2014	Hot Trend Award	Crayon Pop	Won

=== Golden Disk Awards ===
Year	Category	Recipient	Result
2014	Digital Bonsang	"Bar Bar Bar"	Nominated
2014	New Rising Star (Digital)	Crayon Pop	Won

=== Mnet Asian Music Awards ===
Year	Category	Recipient	Result
2013	Best New Female Artist	Crayon Pop	Won
2013	Artist of the Year	Crayon Pop	Nominated
2013	Best Dance Performance – Female Group	"Bar Bar Bar"	Nominated
2013	Song of the Year	"Bar Bar Bar"	Nominated

=== Melon Music Awards ===
Year	Category	Recipient	Result
2013	Hot Trend Award	Crayon Pop	Won
2013	Music Video Award	"Bar Bar Bar"	Nominated

=== Seoul Music Awards ===
Year	Category	Recipient	Result
2014	Bonsang	Crayon Pop	Nominated
2014	New Artist Award	Crayon Pop	Won
2014	Popularity Award	Crayon Pop	Nominated

=== Korean Music Awards ===
Year	Category	Recipient	Result
2014	Song of the Year	"Bar Bar Bar"	Nominated
2014	Best Dance & Electronic Song	"Bar Bar Bar"	Nominated
2014	Group Musician of the Year Netizen Vote	Crayon Pop	Nominated

=== KBS Gayo Daechukje ===
Year	Category	Recipient	Result
2013	Artist of the Year	Crayon Pop	Won

=== Style Icon Awards ===
Year	Category	Recipient	Result
2013	New Icon	Crayon Pop	Won

=== Korea Cultural Entertainment Awards ===
Year	Category	Recipient	Result
2013	K-pop Teenage Star	Crayon Pop	Won

=== Hawaii International Music Award Festival (HIMAF) ===
Year	Category	Recipient	Result
2013	Rising Star	Crayon Pop	Won

=== Korea Wave Awards ===
Year	Category	Recipient	Result
2013	Pop-culture	Crayon Pop	Won

=== Asia Model Awards ===
Year	Category	Recipient	Result
2014	Female Singer - New Star Award	Crayon Pop	Won

=== Singapore Entertainment Awards ===
Year	Category	Recipient	Result
2014	Most Popular K-pop Music Video	"Bar Bar Bar"	Nominated

=== Seoul Foreign Correspondents' Club Awards ===
Year	Category	Recipient	Result
2013	Foreign Correspondents Award	Crayon Pop	Won

=== Seoul International Youth Film Festival ===
Year	Category	Recipient	Result
2014	Best OST by a Female Artist	"Hey Mister"	Nominated

=== MTV IGGY's ===
Year	Category	Recipient	Result
2013	Artist of the Week	Crayon Pop	Won
