= Circle Social Chart =

South Korean musical artist ranking chart

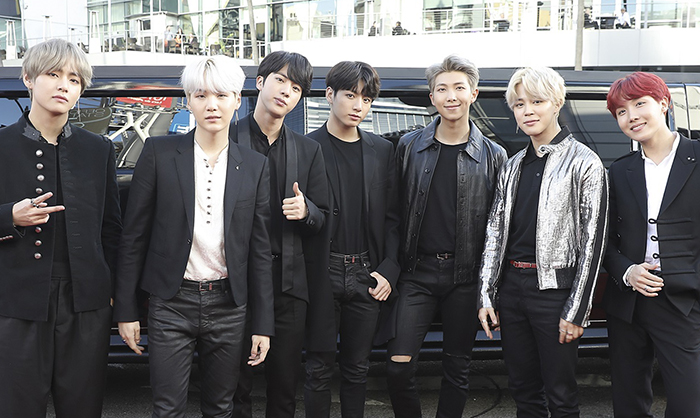
BTS has spent the most weeks overall (205) as number one on the Social Chart.

The Circle Social Chart (Korean: 써클 소셜차트; RR: Sseokeul ssosyol-chateu), formerly the Gaon Social Chart (Korean: 가온 소셜차트; RR: Gaon ssosyol-chateu), part of Circle Chart, is a weekly chart that ranks the top 50 most-popular South Korean musical artists according to data collected from the digital platforms YouTube, Mubeat, Higher, and Tencent.

Launched in July 2013 by the Korea Music Content Association (KMCA), the chart originally ranked the top 100 South Korean songs according to their worldwide popularity on social networking sites. From July 15, 2013 to June 22, 2014, data was taken from YouTube, Twitter, Facebook and Me2day. After Me2day closed, data was taken from YouTube, Twitter, and Facebook. In July 2014, in conjunction with the launch of the Gaon Weibo Chart—a joint venture between Gaon and Sina—Facebook was replaced by Weibo. YinYueTai was added to the chart's metrics in February 2016, effective the week eight issue. Weibo was removed in July 2017 after its data partnership with Gaon ended. The final issue published of the song-oriented version of the chart was the week 27 issue, for the period dated June 30–July 6, 2019. "Boy with Luv" by BTS was the number-one song at that time. "TT" by Twice was the longest-running number-one for the chart's duration, with a collective total of 16 non-consecutive weeks.

On July 17, 2019, Gaon published notice of the Social Chart's reorganization into an artist-oriented chart on its website. The KMCA announced the changeover to the Social Chart 2.0 on July 19. Data would now be aggregated from V Live, Mubeat, SMR, and MyCelebs going forward, with YouTube to be added later on in the year. The video platform's official inclusion in the Social chart's metrics was announced in February 2020. Data was retroactively integrated into past chart issues beginning from the first week of January. BTS was the first artist to rank at number one on the new chart. A data partnership with TikTok was announced on May 10, 2021. The platform was integrated into the chart's metrics beginning June 1, and its inclusion was reflected in the week 23 issue released on June 10 for the period May 30–June 5, 2021. V Live was removed from the chart's metrics effective January 1, 2022—notice was posted on January 3—and this was reflected in the first issue of the year, for the week that began on December 26, 2021. Following a complete rebrand by the KMCA in July 2022, it was renamed the Circle Social Chart.

TikTok was removed from the 2.0 chart's metrics sometime in early 2025. On March 13, the termination of the 2.0 chart was announced in order to facilitate the introduction of the 3.0 chart, set for the latter half of 2025. The week 10 issue of the 2.0 chart, for the period March 2–8, was the final issue released, and the chart was terminated on March 14. The first issue released of the 3.0 chart was for the week dated July 27 to August 2.

The act that spends the most weeks at number one on the chart is awarded the Social Hot Star of the Year award at the annual Gaon Chart Music Awards. BTS was the inaugural recipient, at the 2019 ceremony, and remains the artist with the most weeks at number one overall on the chart.

== Number-one songs ==
Though this version of the Social chart became defunct by the end of June 2019, archives of all past issues were still accessible on the Gaon website via the original url. Following a complete rebrand of all Gaon charts in July 2022, which also included an update of all urls, the old song chart url is no longer live and no archives are available on the new Circle Chart website.

List of number-one songs on the Gaon Social Chart
Week end date	Song	Artist	Social Count	Ref.
2013
July 20	"Destiny"	Infinite	74,053	
July 27	"Shadow" (그림자)	Beast	79,700	
August 3	"Shadow" (그림자)	Beast	80,234	
August 10	"Shadow" (그림자)	Beast	79,396	
August 17	"Shadow" (그림자)	Beast	79,717	
August 24	"Bar Bar Bar" (빠빠빠)	Crayon Pop	79,006	
August 31	"No Joke" (장난아냐)	Teen Top	83,705	
September 7	"Damaged Lady" (숙녀가 못 돼)	Kara	82,030	
September 14	"Damaged Lady" (숙녀가 못 돼)	Kara	93,268	
September 21	"Bar Bar Bar" (빠빠빠)	Crayon Pop	69,690	
September 28	"Be the Light" (빛이 되어줘)	Block B	82,099	
October 5	"Very Good"	Block B	69,872	
October 12	"Number Nine" (넘버나인)	T-ara	70,940	
October 19	"Number Nine" (넘버나인)	T-ara	96,043	
October 26	"You Don't Know Love" (촌스럽게 왜 이래)	K.Will	91,490	
November 2	"Now" (내일은 없어)	Trouble Maker	92,137	
November 9	"Now" (내일은 없어)	Trouble Maker	92,777	
November 16	"Hush"	Miss A	91,573	
November 23	"Now" (내일은 없어)	Trouble Maker	86,311	
November 30	"Now" (내일은 없어)	Trouble Maker	87,895	
December 7	"Lonely Christmas" (꾸리스마스)	Crayon Pop	86,069	
December 14	"Lonely Christmas" (꾸리스마스)	Crayon Pop	84,293	
December 21	"Lonely Christmas" (꾸리스마스)	Crayon Pop	90,883	
December 28	"Lonely Christmas" (꾸리스마스)	Crayon Pop	93,060	
2014
January 4	"Bar Bar Bar" (빠빠빠)	Crayon Pop	86,477	
January 11	"Something"	Girl's Day	97,182	
January 18	"Lonely" (없구나)	B1A4	87,797	
January 25	"Cha Cha"	Rainbow Blaxx	79,122	
February 1	"Miniskirt" (짧은 치마)	AOA	78,909	
February 8	"1004 (Angel)"	B.A.P	74,159	
February 15	"Marionette" (마리오네트)	Stellar	70,586	
February 22	"Marionette" (마리오네트)	Stellar	91,862	
March 1	"Can't Stop"	CNBLUE	87,419	
March 8	"Can't Stop"	CNBLUE	99,795	
March 15	"Can't Stop"	CNBLUE	96,758	
March 22	"Catallena" (까탈레나)	Orange Caramel	99,500	
March 29	"Whatcha Doin' Today" (오늘 뭐해)	4Minute	94,212	
April 5	"Mr. Chu"	Apink	88,111	
April 12	"Uh-ee" (어이)	Crayon Pop	94,723	
April 19	"Uh-ee" (어이)	Crayon Pop	76,042	
April 26	"Trouble Maker"	Trouble Maker	72,071	
May 3	"Whatcha Doin' Today" (오늘 뭐해)	4Minute	65,179	
May 10	"Whatcha Doin' Today" (오늘 뭐해)	4Minute	66,169	
May 17	"Pretty Lingerie" (예쁜 속옷)	G.NA	79,896	
May 24	"1 Minute 1 Second" (1분 1초)	Jiyeon	74,393	
May 31	"Last Romeo"	Infinite	79,500	
June 7	"Don't Flirt" (끼부리지마)	U-KISS	83,313	
June 14	"Don't Flirt" (끼부리지마)	U-KISS	80,904	
June 21	"Good Luck"	Beast	68,326	
June 28	"Short Hair" (단발머리)	AOA	90,853	
July 5	"Good Luck"	Beast	89,600	
July 12	"Good Luck"	Beast	99,179	
July 19	"Good Luck"	Beast	68,678	
July 26	"Touch My Body"	Sistar	68,979	
August 2	"Red" (빨개요)	Hyuna	66,499	
August 9	"Red" (빨개요)	Hyuna	70,303	
August 16	"Red" (빨개요)	Hyuna	78,849	
August 23	"Back Seat"	JYJ	69,048	
August 30	"Red" (빨개요)	Hyuna	73,484	
September 6	"Red" (빨개요)	Hyuna	68,291	
September 13	"Red" (빨개요)	Hyuna	64,996	
September 20	"Red" (빨개요)	Hyuna	67,347	
September 27	"Red" (빨개요)	Hyuna	57,182	
October 4	"Don't Touch Me" (손대지마)	Ailee	70,079	
October 11	"Don't Touch Me" (손대지마)	Ailee	70,159	
October 18	"Error"	VIXX	62,634	
October 25	"12:30" (12시 30분)	Beast	66,646	
November 1	"12:30" (12시 30분)	Beast	71,982	
November 8	"12:30" (12시 30분)	Beast	68,841	
November 15	"Like a Cat" (사뿐사뿐)	AOA	66,358	
November 22	"Like a Cat" (사뿐사뿐)	AOA	71,102	
November 29	"Like a Cat" (사뿐사뿐)	AOA	61,207	
December 6	"Like a Cat" (사뿐사뿐)	AOA	65,403	
December 13	"Like a Cat" (사뿐사뿐)	AOA	66,007	
December 20	"Like a Cat" (사뿐사뿐)	AOA	63,803	
December 27 (Note: Gaon inexplicably labelled the chart issue for the tracking period ending December 27 as the first week of 2015 on its website. This article follows standard Gregorian order for a calendar year and lists the week as the last of 2014 in the table.)	"Up & Down" (위아래)	EXID	66,876	
2015
January 3	"Up & Down" (위아래)	EXID	50,166	
January 10	"Up & Down" (위아래)	EXID	56,769	
January 17	"Up & Down" (위아래)	EXID	52,508	
January 24	"One Fine Day" (어느 멋진 날)	Jung Yong-hwa	75,611	
January 31	"One Fine Day" (어느 멋진 날)	Jung Yong-hwa	70,341	
February 7	"One Fine Day" (어느 멋진 날)	Jung Yong-hwa	56,019	
February 14	"Crazy" (미쳐)	4Minute	68,537	
February 21	"Crazy" (미쳐)	4Minute	54,890	
February 28	"Love Equation" (이별공식)	VIXX	71,360	
March 7	"Sniper" (표적)	Shinhwa	57,996	
March 14	"Sniper" (표적)	Shinhwa	72,398	
March 21	"Sniper" (표적)	Shinhwa	74,244	
March 28	"Sniper" (표적)	Shinhwa	58,314	
April 4	"Crazy" (미쳐)	4Minute	49,688	
April 11	"Crazy" (미쳐)	4Minute	49,640	
April 18	"Ah Yeah"	EXID	51,086	
April 25	"Ah Yeah"	EXID	51,219	
May 2	"Ah Yeah"	EXID	52,250	
May 9	"Ah Yeah"	EXID	51,236	
May 16	"Ma First" (가 처음이야)	Jang Hyun-seung	71,360	
May 23	"Ah Yeah"	EXID	52,131	
May 30	"Cupid"	Kara	73,242	
June 6	"Ah Yeah"	EXID	49,736	
June 13	"Ah Yeah"	EXID	49,727	
June 20	"Ah Yeah"	EXID	51,220	
June 27	"Heart Attack"	AOA	57,884	
July 4	"Heart Attack"	AOA	66,167	
July 11	"Heart Attack"	AOA	60,533	
July 18	"Bad"	Infinite	65,230	
July 25	"Bad"	Infinite	63,957	
August 1	"Yey"	Beast	65,039	
August 8	"So Crazy" (완전 미쳤네)	T-ara	49,747	
August 15	"Heart Attack"	AOA	50,252	
August 22	"Roll Deep" (잘나가서 그래)	Hyuna	51,820	
August 29	"Roll Deep" (잘나가서 그래)	Hyuna	64,193	
September 5	"Roll Deep" (잘나가서 그래)	Hyuna	65,285	
September 12	"Roll Deep" (잘나가서 그래)	Hyuna	52,932	
September 19	"Mansae" (만세)	Seventeen	Score not available	
September 26	"Mansae" (만세)	Seventeen	52,910	
October 3	"Roll Deep" (잘나가서 그래)	Hyuna	49,715	
October 10	"Roll Deep" (잘나가서 그래)	Hyuna	49,591	
October 17	"Roll Deep" (잘나가서 그래)	Hyuna	49,667	
October 24	"Roll Deep" (잘나가서 그래)	Hyuna	49,636	
October 31	"Roll Deep" (잘나가서 그래)	Hyuna	49,694	
November 7	"Roll Deep" (잘나가서 그래)	Hyuna	49,916	
November 14	"Chained Up" (사슬)	VIXX	89,275	
November 21	"Hot Pink"	EXID	58,674	
November 28	"Hot Pink"	EXID	58,041	
December 5	"Run"	BTS	89,494	
December 12	"Hot Pink"	EXID	51,574	
December 19	"Hot Pink"	EXID	50,729	
December 26	"Again" (다시)	Turbo featuring Yoo Jae-suk	50,471	
2016
January 2	"Hot Pink"	EXID	53,412	
January 9	"Dream"	Suzy and Baekhyun	61,869	
January 16	"Dream"	Suzy and Baekhyun	61,869	
January 23	"Warning Sign" (사각지대)	Teen Top	71,965	
January 30	"I Am You, You Are Me" (너는 나 나는 너)	Zico	51,364	
February 6	"Hate" (싫어)	4Minute	53,519	
February 13	"Hate" (싫어)	4Minute	71,344	
February 20	"Hate" (싫어)	4Minute	53,627	
February 27	"Wait 10 Years Baby" (10년만 기다려 베이베)	Six Bomb	49,693	
March 5	"You're the Best" (넌 is 뭔들)	Mamamoo	68,530	
March 12	"You're the Best" (넌 is 뭔들)	Mamamoo	63,144	
March 19	"Everytime"	Chen and Punch	51,792	
March 26	"Everytime"	Chen and Punch	50,155	
April 2	"Talk Love" (말해! 뭐해?)	K.Will	50,662	
April 9	"Talk Love" (말해! 뭐해?)	K.Will	50,878	
April 16	"Everytime"	Chen and Punch	50,464	
April 23	"Epilogue: Young Forever"	BTS	53,080	
April 30	"Cheer Up"	Twice	51,761	
May 7	"Fire" (불타오르네)	BTS	76,561	
May 14	"Fire" (불타오르네)	BTS	89,116	
May 21	"Fire" (불타오르네)	BTS	59,504	
May 28	"Cheer Up"	Twice	53,240	
June 4	"Cheer Up"	Twice	54,739	
June 11	"Cheer Up"	Twice	54,762	
June 18	"Cheer Up"	Twice	51,457	
June 25	"I Like That"	Sistar	51,364	
July 2	"I Like That"	Sistar	57,446	
July 9	"Very Nice" (아주 Nice)	Seventeen	84,824	
July 16	"Navillera" (너 그리고 나)	GFriend	59,926	
July 23	"Very Nice" (아주 Nice)	Seventeen	59,597	
July 30	"Fire" (불타오르네)	BTS	58,818	
August 6	"How's This?" (어때?)	Hyuna	56,147	
August 13	"Whatta Man"	I.O.I	54,460	
August 20	"Fantasy"	VIXX	70,160	
August 27	"Cheer Up"	Twice	50,387	
September 3	"For You" (너를 위해)	Chen, Baekhyun and Xiumin	51,157	
September 10	"The Love I Committed" (내가 저지른 사랑)	Im Chang-jung	49,828	
September 17	"Cheer Up"	Twice	50,544	
September 24	"The Eye" (태풍)	Infinite	50,544	
October 1	"Only One" (내가 설렐 수 있게)	Apink	57,867	
October 8	"Fighter"	Monsta X	50,833	
October 15	"Blood Sweat & Tears" (피 땀 눈물)	BTS	77,934	
October 22	"Blood Sweat & Tears" (피 땀 눈물)	BTS	89,658	
October 29	"TT"	Twice	70,688	
November 5	"TT"	Twice	81,724	
November 12	"TT"	Twice	66,796	
November 19	"TT"	Twice	84,556	
November 26	"TT"	Twice	63,435	
December 3	"TT"	Twice	62,274	
December 10	"Boom Boom" (붐붐)	Seventeen	72,497	
December 17	"TT"	Twice	53,959	
December 24	"TT"	Twice	57,325	
December 31	"TT"	Twice	72,765	
2017
January 7	"TT"	Twice	69,939	
January 14	"TT"	Twice	58,668	
January 21	"Hobgoblin" (도깨비)	CLC	62,212	
January 28	"TT"	Twice	65,835	
February 4	"TT"	Twice	55,605	
February 11	"TT"	Twice	58,731	
February 18	"Spring Day" (봄날)	BTS	84,559	
February 25	"Not Today"	BTS	66,427	
March 4	"Not Today"	BTS	65,392	
March 11	"Spring Day" (봄날)	BTS	65,527	
March 18	"Knock Knock"	Twice	53,144	
March 25	"Knock Knock"	Twice	51,660	
April 1	"Knock Knock"	Twice	51,761	
April 8	"Knock Knock"	Twice	51,217	
April 15	"Knock Knock"	Twice	51,487	
April 22	"Palette"	IU featuring G-Dragon	51,440	
April 29	"Palette"	IU featuring G-Dragon	55,430	
May 6	"Not Today"	BTS	70,740	
May 13	"Not Today"	BTS	64,767	
May 20	"Signal"	Twice	78,934	
May 27	"Signal"	Twice	73,804	
June 3	"Signal"	Twice	72,167	
June 10	"Signal"	Twice	70,748	
June 17	"Signal"	Twice	68,481	
June 24	"Signal"	Twice	57,181	
July 1	"TT"	Twice	73,158	
July 8	"Signal"	Twice	55,791	
July 15	"Signal"	Twice	54,093	
July 22	"Hola Hola"	KARD	49,542	
July 29	"Signal"	Twice	50,011	
August 5	"Love Whisper" (귀를 기울이면)	GFriend	50,702	
August 12	"Energetic" (에너제틱)	Wanna One	52,821	
August 19	"Energetic" (에너제틱)	Wanna One	56,113	
August 26	"TT"	Twice	50,425	
September 2	"Fire" (불타오르네)	BTS	50,032	
September 9	"Fire" (불타오르네)	BTS	49,807	
September 16	"Summer Rain" (여름비)	GFriend	51,121	
September 23	"DNA"	BTS	84,150	
September 30	"DNA"	BTS	98,121	
October 7	"DNA"	BTS	99,000	
October 14	"DNA"	BTS	86,306	
October 21	"DNA"	BTS	81,398	
October 28	"DNA"	BTS	85,303	
November 4	"Likey"	Twice	86,752	
November 11	"Likey"	Twice	64,958	
November 18	"Likey"	Twice	78,376	
November 25	"Likey"	Twice	74,735	
December 2	"MIC Drop (Steve Aoki Remix)"	BTS featuring Desiigner	99,000	
December 9	"MIC Drop (Steve Aoki Remix)"	BTS featuring Desiigner	99,000	
December 16	"Heart Shaker"	Twice	97,819	
December 23	"Heart Shaker"	Twice	92,293	
December 30	"Heart Shaker"	Twice	76,035	
2018
January 6	"MIC Drop (Steve Aoki Remix)"	BTS featuring Desiigner	96,788	
January 13	"MIC Drop (Steve Aoki Remix)"	BTS featuring Desiigner	78,472	
January 20	"MIC Drop (Steve Aoki Remix)"	BTS featuring Desiigner	76,586	
January 27	"MIC Drop (Steve Aoki Remix)"	BTS featuring Desiigner	77,272	
February 3	"MIC Drop (Steve Aoki Remix)"	BTS featuring Desiigner	76,103	
February 10	"MIC Drop (Steve Aoki Remix)"	BTS featuring Desiigner	79,365	
February 17	"MIC Drop (Steve Aoki Remix)"	BTS featuring Desiigner	80,679	
February 24	"MIC Drop (Steve Aoki Remix)"	BTS featuring Desiigner	78,405	
March 3	"MIC Drop (Steve Aoki Remix)"	BTS featuring Desiigner	77,145	
March 10	"Daydream" (백일몽)	J-Hope	69,300	
March 17	"DNA"	BTS	72,545	
March 24	"DNA"	BTS	70,455	
March 31	"DNA"	BTS	69,784	
April 7	"DNA"	BTS	75,926	
April 14	"What Is Love?"	Twice	99,000	
April 21	"What Is Love?"	Twice	90,453	
April 28	"What Is Love?"	Twice	90,066	
May 5	"Time for the Moon Night" (밤)	GFriend	91,199	
May 12	"Bboom Bboom" (뿜뿜)	Momoland	71,874	
May 19	"Fake Love"	BTS	69,300	
May 26	"Fake Love"	BTS	99,000	
June 2	"Fake Love"	BTS	74,987	
June 9	"Fake Love"	BTS	86,025	
June 16	"Fake Love"	BTS	88,203	
June 23	"Fake Love"	BTS	77,556	
June 30	"Baam"	Momoland	81,349	
July 7	"I'm So Sick" (1도 없어)	Apink	83,046	
July 14	"Dance the Night Away"	Twice	99,000	
July 21	"Dance the Night Away"	Twice	74,853	
July 28	"Dance the Night Away"	Twice	73,172	
August 4	"Dance the Night Away"	Twice	76,465	
August 11	"Fake Love"	BTS	71,633	
August 18	"Hann (Alone)" (한(一))	(G)I-DLE	99,000	
August 25	"Idol"	BTS	69,300	
September 1	"Idol"	BTS	99,000	
September 8	"Idol"	BTS	73,895	
September 15	"Idol"	BTS	71,480	
September 22	"Idol"	BTS	71,164	
September 29	"Idol"	BTS	73,966	
October 6	"Idol"	BTS	74,549	
October 13	"Idol"	BTS	71,306	
October 20	"Bbibbi"	IU	86,662	
October 27	"Idol"	BTS	72,242	
November 3	"La Vie en Rose"	Iz One	93,668	
November 10	"Yes or Yes"	Twice	87,932	
November 17	"Yes or Yes"	Twice	88,404	
November 24	"Yes or Yes"	Twice	74,523	
December 1	"Yes or Yes"	Twice	73,547	
December 8	"Idol"	BTS	70,506	
December 15	"The Best Thing I Ever Did"	Twice	78,005	
December 22	"Idol"	BTS	70,162	
December 29	"Idol"	BTS	69,812	
2019
January 5	"DNA"	BTS	69,957	
January 12	"DNA"	BTS	69,909	
January 19	"Sunrise"	GFriend	82,819	
January 26	"Home"	Seventeen	69,856	
February 2	"Idol"	BTS	70,158	
February 9	"Idol"	BTS	70,258	
February 16	"Twit"	Hwasa	83,395	
February 23	"Alligator"	Monsta X	69,300	
March 2	"Senorita"	(G)I-dle	71,950	
March 9	"Crown"	TXT	69,300	
March 16	"Spring"	Park Bom (featuring Sandara Park)	71,137	
March 23	"Gogobebe"	Mamamoo	97,502	
March 30	"I'm So Hot"	Momoland	69,300	
April 6	"Violeta"	Iz One	69,300	
April 13	"Boy with Luv"	BTS	99,000	
April 20	"Boy with Luv"	BTS	99,000	
April 27	"Fancy"	Twice	99,000	
May 4	"Boy with Luv"	BTS	89,992	
May 11	"Boy with Luv"	BTS	92,812	
May 18	"Boy with Luv"	BTS	77,974	
May 25	"Boy with Luv"	BTS	78,489	
June 1	"Boy with Luv"	BTS	81,261	
June 8	"Boy with Luv"	BTS	86,332	
June 15	"Boy with Luv"	BTS	87,997	
June 22	"Boy with Luv"	BTS	91,304	
June 29	"Boy with Luv"	BTS	90,918	
July 6 (Note: There is a one-week overlap for the period dated June 30–July 6, 2019 where the original Social Chart ended and the 2.0 version began. While this period is listed on both chart editions, and BTS is shown as number one on both rankings, the week is counted only once in the group's total. There is no duplication.)	"Boy with Luv"	BTS	86,802	

== Number-one artists ==
List of number-one artists on the Gaon/Circle Social Chart 2.0
Week end date	Artist
2019
July 6	BTS
July 13	BTS
July 20	BTS
July 27	BTS
August 3	BTS
August 10	BTS
August 17	BTS
August 24	BTS
August 31	BTS
September 7	BTS
September 14	BTS
September 21	BTS
September 28	BTS
October 5	BTS
October 12	BTS
October 19	BTS
October 26	BTS
November 2	BTS
November 9	BTS
November 16	BTS
November 23	BTS
November 30	BTS
December 7	Kang Daniel
December 14	Park Ji-hoon
December 21	Park Ji-hoon
December 28	BTS
2020
January 4	BTS
January 11	BTS
January 18	BTS
January 25	BTS
February 1	BTS
February 8	BTS
February 15	BTS
February 22	BTS
February 29	BTS
March 7	BTS
March 14	BTS
March 21	BTS
March 28	BTS
April 4	BTS
April 11	BTS
April 18	BTS
April 25	BTS
May 2	BTS
May 9	BTS
May 16	BTS
May 23	BTS
May 30	Blackpink
June 6	Blackpink
June 13	Blackpink
June 20	Blackpink
June 27	Blackpink
July 4	Blackpink
July 11	Blackpink
July 18	Blackpink
July 25	Blackpink
August 1	Blackpink
August 8	Blackpink
August 15	Blackpink
August 22	Blackpink
August 29	Blackpink
September 5	Blackpink
September 12	Blackpink
September 19	Blackpink
September 26	Blackpink
October 3	Blackpink
October 10	Blackpink
October 17	Blackpink
October 24	Blackpink
October 31	Blackpink
November 7	Blackpink
November 14	Blackpink
November 21	BTS
November 28	Blackpink
December 5	Blackpink
December 12	Blackpink
December 19	Blackpink
December 26	BTS
2021
January 2	Blackpink
January 9	Blackpink
January 16	Blackpink
January 23	Blackpink
January 30	Blackpink
February 6	Blackpink
February 13	Blackpink
February 20	Blackpink
February 27	Blackpink
March 6	Blackpink
March 13	Blackpink
March 20	BTS
March 27	BTS
April 3	BTS
April 10	BTS
April 17	BTS
April 24	BTS
May 1	BTS
May 8	BTS
May 15	BTS
May 22	BTS
May 29	BTS
June 5	BTS
June 12	BTS
June 19	BTS
June 26	BTS
July 3	BTS
July 10	BTS
July 17	BTS
July 24	BTS
July 31	BTS
August 7	BTS
August 14	BTS
August 21	BTS
August 28	BTS
September 4	BTS
September 11	BTS
September 18	BTS
September 25	BTS
October 2	BTS
October 9	BTS
October 16	BTS
October 23	BTS
October 30	BTS
November 6	BTS
November 13	BTS
November 20	BTS
November 27	BTS
December 4	BTS
December 11	BTS
December 18	BTS
December 25	BTS
2022
January 1	BTS
January 8	BTS
January 15	BTS
January 22	BTS
January 29	BTS
February 5	BTS
February 12	BTS
February 19	BTS
February 26	BTS
March 5	BTS
March 12	BTS
March 19	BTS
March 26	BTS
April 2	BTS
April 9	BTS
April 16	BTS
April 23	BTS
April 30	BTS
May 7	BTS
May 14	BTS
May 21	BTS
May 28	BTS
June 4	BTS
June 11	BTS
June 18	BTS
June 25	BTS
July 2	BTS
July 9 (Note: first issue published as the Circle Social Chart)	BTS
July 16	BTS
July 23	BTS
July 30	BTS
August 6	BTS
August 13	BTS
August 20	BTS
August 27	Blackpink
September 3	Blackpink
September 10	Blackpink
September 17	Blackpink
September 24	Blackpink
October 1	Blackpink
October 8	Blackpink
October 15	Blackpink
October 22	Blackpink
October 29	Blackpink
November 5	Blackpink
November 12	Blackpink
November 19	Blackpink
November 26	Blackpink
December 3	Blackpink
December 10	Blackpink
December 17	Blackpink
December 24	Blackpink
December 31	Blackpink
2023
January 7	Blackpink
January 14	Blackpink
January 21	Blackpink
January 28	Blackpink
February 4	Blackpink
February 11	Blackpink
February 18	Blackpink
February 25	Blackpink
March 4	Blackpink
March 11	Blackpink
March 18	Blackpink
March 25	Blackpink
April 1	Blackpink
April 8	Blackpink
April 15	Blackpink
April 22	Jisoo
April 29	Jisoo
May 6	Jisoo
May 13	Jisoo
May 20	Jisoo
May 27	Jisoo
June 3	Jisoo
June 10	Fifty Fifty
June 17	Fifty Fifty
June 24	Fifty Fifty
July 1	Fifty Fifty
July 8	Fifty Fifty
July 15	Fifty Fifty
July 22	Fifty Fifty
July 29	Fifty Fifty
August 5	Fifty Fifty
August 12	NewJeans
August 19	NewJeans
August 26	Fifty Fifty
September 2	Fifty Fifty
September 9	Fifty Fifty
September 16	Fifty Fifty
September 23	Fifty Fifty
September 30	Fifty Fifty
October 7	Fifty Fifty
October 14	Jungkook
October 21	Jungkook
October 28	Fifty Fifty
November 4	Fifty Fifty
November 11	Jungkook
November 18	Jungkook
November 25	Jungkook
December 2	Jungkook
December 9	Fifty Fifty
December 16	Jungkook
December 23	Fifty Fifty
December 30	Fifty Fifty
2024
January 6	Fifty Fifty
January 13	Fifty Fifty
January 20	Fifty Fifty
January 27	Fifty Fifty
February 3	Fifty Fifty
February 10	Fifty Fifty
February 17	Fifty Fifty
February 24	Fifty Fifty
March 2	Fifty Fifty
March 9	Fifty Fifty
March 16	Fifty Fifty
March 23	Twice
March 30	Twice
April 6	Fifty Fifty
April 13	Fifty Fifty
April 20	Fifty Fifty
April 27	Fifty Fifty
May 4	Fifty Fifty
May 11	Fifty Fifty
May 18	Fifty Fifty
May 25	Aespa
June 1	Aespa
June 8	Aespa
June 15	Aespa
June 22	NewJeans
June 29	NewJeans
July 6	Lisa
July 13	Lisa
July 20	NewJeans
July 27	NewJeans
August 3	NewJeans
August 10	Blackpink
August 17	Fifty Fifty
August 24	Fifty Fifty
August 31	Choi Yu-ree
September 7	Choi Yu-ree
September 14	Blackpink
September 21	Fifty Fifty
September 28	Fifty Fifty
October 5	Fifty Fifty
October 12	Blackpink
October 19	Blackpink
October 26	Fifty Fifty
November 2	Blackpink
November 9	— (Note: Week 45 for the period dated November 3 to 9, 2024 is missing from chart.)
November 16	Blackpink
November 23	Blackpink
November 30	Blackpink
December 7	Blackpink
December 14	Fifty Fifty
December 21	Fifty Fifty
December 28	Fifty Fifty
2025
January 4	Choi Yu-ree
January 11	Jung Jae-il
January 18	Jung Jae-il
January 25	Jung Jae-il
February 1	Jung Jae-il
February 8	Jung Jae-il
February 15	Jung Jae-il
February 22	Jung Jae-il
March 1	Jung Jae-il
March 8	Jisoo
March 15 (Note: 2.0 chart terminated)	—
March 22	—
March 29	—
April 5	—
April 12	—
April 19	—
April 25	—
May 3	—
May 10	—
May 17	—
May 24	—
May 31	—
June 7	—
June 14	—
June 21	—
June 28	—
July 5	—
July 12	—
July 19	—
July 26	—
August 2 (Note: 3.0 chart activated)	Blackpink
August 9	Blackpink
August 16	Blackpink
August 23	Blackpink
August 30	Blackpink
September 6	Blackpink
September 13	Blackpink
September 20	Blackpink
September 27	Blackpink
October 4	Twice
October 11	Twice
October 18	Twice
October 25	Twice
November 1	Twice
November 8	Twice
November 15	Twice
November 22	Twice
November 29	Twice
December 6	Twice
December 13	Twice
December 20	Twice
December 27	Illit
2026
January 3	Illit
January 10	Illit
January 17	Illit
January 24	Illit
January 31	Illit
February 7	Illit
February 14	Illit
February 21	Twice
February 28	Blackpink
March 7	Blackpink
March 14	Blackpink
March 21	BTS
March 28	BTS
April 4	BTS
April 11	BTS
April 18	BTS
April 25	BTS
May 2	Illit
May 9	Illit
May 16	Illit
May 23	BTS
May 30	Illit
June 6	Illit
June 13	BTS
June 20	Illit
June 27	Illit
July 4	Illit
July 11	Illit
July 18	Illit
July 25	BTS
August 1	Illit
August 8	BTS
August 15	BTS
August 22	BTS
August 29	Illit
September 5	Illit
September 12	Illit
September 19	Illit
September 26	Illit
October 3	Illit
October 10	Illit
October 17	Illit
October 24	BTS
October 31	Illit
November 7	Illit
November 14	Illit

== Songs with the most weeks at number one ==
Where multiple songs share the same ranking, entries are listed oldest to newest.

Rank	Song	Artist	Count	Year
1st	"TT"	Twice	16 weeks	2016–17
2nd	"Idol"	BTS	14 weeks	2018–19
3rd	"DNA"	BTS	12 weeks	2017–19
3rd	"Boy With Luv"	BTS	12 weeks	2019
4th	"Mic Drop (Steve Aoki Remix)"	BTS featuring Desiigner	11 weeks	2017–18
5th	"Roll Deep"	Hyuna	10 weeks	2015
6th	"Signal"	Twice	9 weeks	2017
7th	"Red"	Hyuna	8 weeks	2014
7th	"Ah Yeah"	EXID	8 weeks	2015
8th	"Cheer Up"	Twice	7 weeks	2016
8th	"Fake Love"	BTS	7 weeks	2018
9th	"Like a Cat"	AOA	6 weeks	2014
9th	"Fire"	BTS	6 weeks	2016–17
10th	"Hot Pink"	EXID	5 weeks	2015–16
10th	"Knock Knock"	Twice	5 weeks	2017

== Artists with the most cumulative weeks at number one ==
Rank	Artist	Count
1st	BTS	205 weeks
2nd	Blackpink	95 weeks
3rd	Twice	72 weeks
4th	Fifty Fifty	48 weeks
5th	Illit	29 weeks
6th	Hyuna	19 weeks
7th	EXID	17 weeks
8th	Beast	12 weeks
8th	AOA	12 weeks
9th	4Minute	10 weeks
10th	Crayon Pop	9 weeks

== See also ==
- Billboard Social 50
