= The 1st Mini Album (Strawberry Milk EP) =

EP by Crayon Pop – Strawberry Milk
- Released: October 15, 2014
- Recorded: August–September 2014
- Genre: K-pop
- Length: 29:44
- Language: Korean
- Label: Chrome Entertainment; Sony Music

Singles from The 1st Mini Album
- 1. "OK" Released: October 15, 2014

The 1st Mini Album is the debut mini album by Crayon Pop sub-unit Strawberry Milk, composed of identical twins Choa and Way. It was released on October 15, 2014 by Chrome Entertainment and Sony Music.

== Production and composition ==
"OK" was described as an "unplugged dance number with rock sounds". In the lyrics, a girl describes how the man she is in love with is her ideal type—perfect and "okay" in every way. The song was written by Crazy Park (Park Hyun-joong) of the agency Crazy Sound, in collaboration with Shinto and Peter Pan. These songwriters had previously written songs such as "Oppa, You're Mine" and "Oh My God". Choa and Way also took part in the song's production, including concept, costumes, and choreography.

"Let Me Know" is a ballad written by Way, who had previously written songs as a member of indie band N.Dolphin, and the lyrics are based on her and Choa's struggle to become singers. At Strawberry Milk's debut press showcase, Way said, "It was my dream to become a singer since I was young. As I was preparing to become a singer, whenever I experienced hardship, I always prayed to let me know if this is the right path for me. The lyrics are about those prayers."

== Promotion and music videos ==
Strawberry Milk performed "Let Me Know" for the first time at the First Chrome Family in Japan Concert on October 4. Their debut showcase was held on October 15 in Cheongdam, Seoul, and their music show debut stage for "OK" was on M! Countdown on October 16. "OK" was promoted through November on all the major music shows, including The Show, where they were nominated for first place.

The music video for "OK", released on October 15, was directed by Lee Gi Baek. It received one million views on YouTube in less than five days, and ranked high on China's YinYueTai V Chart. The beginning of the music video depicts Choa and Way transforming into Tetris characters and falling into a pink room. In other scenes of the video they are dressed as strawberries or strawberry milk, with oversized forks or straws on their backs. G.Low of K-Much played the "OK" man in the music video. On October 18, a choreography music video for "OK" was released. This video was filmed at a farm, and the twins danced in front of a strawberry greenhouse.

== Reception ==
Scott Interrante, writing for PopMatters, described "OK" as an "overly saccharine Hi-NRG dance song filled with cute vocals, adorable imagery, and a biting wit." He said "Hello" and "Let Me Know" showcase the twins' "surprisingly impressive vocals", but "OK" lacks a "distinct personality", and regretted that the sub-unit did not show a different side than they already show with the main group. However, he concluded that the song is "great for what it is" and noted some similarity with J-pop and Orange Caramel's songs.

== Track listing ==
No.	Title	Lyrics	Music	Length
1.	"OK"	Crazy Park; Peter Pan; Shinto	Crazy Park; Peter Pan; Shinto; Crazy Girl	3:50
2.	"Feel So Good"	Eun Jong Tae	Eun Jong Tae	3:09
3.	"Hello"	Lee Seung Min; Eun Jong Tae	Eun Jong Tae	3:43
4.	"Let Me Know" (Korean: 알려주세요; RR: Allyeojuseyo)	Heo Min-seon (Way)	Heo Min-seon (Way)	4:10
5.	"OK (Inst.)"		Crazy Park; Peter Pan; Shinto; Crazy Girl	3:50
6.	"Feel So Good (Inst.)"		Eun Jong Tae	3:09
7.	"Hello (Inst.)"		Eun Jong Tae	3:43
8.	"Let Me Know (Inst.)"		Heo Min-seon (Way)	4:10
Total length:				29:44

== Personnel ==
These credits were adapted from the album liner notes.

- Hwang Hyun-chang – executive producer, photographer
- Lee Seong-yeon – co-producer
- Chrome Entertainment – producing and marketing
- Eun Jong-tae – music producer, songwriter
- Crazy Park, Shinto, Crazy Girl – songwriters
- Way (Heo Min-seon) – songwriter, chorus ("OK", "Let Me Know")
- No Gyeong-hwan – guitar ("OK")
- No Min-hyeok – guitar ("OK", "Let Me Know")
- Kim Seong-yu – drum ("OK")
- Mindeulle – bass ("OK")
- Choa (Heo Min-jin) – chorus ("OK", "Let Me Know")
- Yu Su-mi – chorus ("OK")
- Kim Nam-gyeong – chorus ("Hello")
- Yu Hwan-hui – chorus ("Feel So Good")
- Park Eun-jeong at Chrome Studio – recording engineer
- Peter Pan at Krazy Studio – recording engineer
- Min Seong-hwan at Hub Studio – mix engineer
- Kim Seok-min at YMC & Eyaki Studio – mix engineer
- Jeon-hun (a.k.a. Big Boom) at Sonic Korea – mastering engineer
- Ryu Song-hwa, Lee Go-eun, Kim Eun-ji, Kim Han-min – Chrome art team
- Lee Jae-seok (a.k.a. Allcheng) – illustrator
- Lee Gyeong-seop at B cut Studio – photographer

== Charts ==
Country	Chart	Peak position
South Korea	Gaon Album Chart (weekly)	8
South Korea	Gaon Album Chart (monthly)	21

=== Sales ===
Title	Chart	Sales
The 1st Mini Album	Gaon physical sales	4,995+
"OK"	Gaon digital sales	24,630+

== Release history ==
Country	Date	Format	Label
South Korea	October 15, 2014	Digital download	Chrome Entertainment, Sony Music
South Korea	October 16, 2014	CD	Chrome Entertainment, Sony Music
Worldwide	October 16, 2014	Digital download	Chrome Entertainment, Sony Music
