= Bob Girls =

South Korean girl group

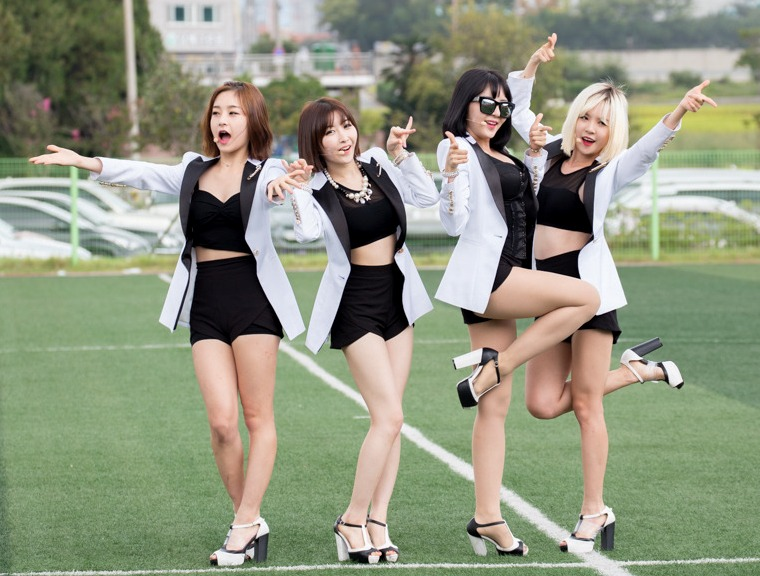
- Bob Girls in September 2014; Left to right: Jina, Danbi, Yujeong, Dahye

Background information
- Origin: Seoul, South Korea
- Genre: K-pop
- Years active: 2014–2015
- Labels: Chrome Entertainment, Sony Music
- Past members: Dahye; Yujeong; Jina; Danbi

- Bob Girls
- Hangul: 단발머리
- Lit.: Short Hair
- RR: Danbalmeori
- MR: Tanbalmŏri

Bob Girls (Korean: 단발머리) was a South Korean girl group under the management of Chrome Entertainment. The group consisted of four members, Dahye, Yujeong, Jina and Danbi. They debuted on June 10, 2014, with the single "No Way" from The 1st Single Album. In February 2015, it was reported that Jina was diagnosed with encephalitis and the group was disbanded.

== History ==
Chrome Entertainment released a picture of Bob Girls on May 21. All four members had bobbed hair, and the agency stated, "Usually when girls cut their long hair, it means they are going through some mental changes. Likewise, Bob Girls aims to represent a shift of womanhood of our times."

Bob Girls' debut showcase was held on June 10 in Gangnam, Seoul. That same day, their first album was released along with a music video for "No Way", the lead single. The album also included a second song, "Oh My Boy" (왜이래; Wae Irae, lit. "Why This Way"). The group made its debut on the music show M! Countdown on June 12. On July 30, promotions began for "Oh My Boy" with a performance on Show Champion. The next day, Bob Girls' album was re-released as Summer Repackage, with summer remixes of both songs.

In late 2014, Bob Girls participated in the first Chrome Family project, a single album titled 2014 Chrome Family – A Very Special Christmas . The album was released digitally on December 3, as well as a music video for the single, "Love Christmas".

On February 24, 2015, it was reported that member Jina was recently diagnosed with encephalitis and her contract with the label was terminated to undergo treatment. Chrome Entertainment also announced the disbandment of the group as the contract of all the other members were terminated as well. On April 2, it was announced that Dahye (now known as Migyo) and Danbi will debut in a four-member girl group called Love Us. On May 8, it was reported that Yujeong would re-debut in a new group in the second half of the year.

== Members ==
- Dahye (다혜) – vocalist
- Yujeong (유정) – rapper, vocalist
- Jina (지나) –vocalist
- Danbi (단비) – vocalist

== Discography ==
=== Singles ===
Title	Year	Peak chart positions	Album
Title	Year	KOR	Album
"No Way"	2014	160	The 1st Single Album
"Oh My Boy" (왜이래)	2014	324	Summer Repackage

==== Collaboration singles ====
Title	Year	Peak chart positions		Sales	Album
Title	Year	KOR Gaon Digital	KOR Gaon Album	Sales	Album
"Love Christmas" (with Crayon Pop, K-Much, and Zan Zan)	2014	134	12	KOR: 1,733+ (CD)	2014 Chrome Family – A Very Special Christmas

== Filmography ==
=== Music videos ===
Year	Title
2014	"No Way"

=== Shows and documentaries ===
Year	Show	Network	Notes
2014	Training the Tomboy Girl Group 'Bob Girls'	MBC	Documentary series

== Concerts and tours ==
=== Concert participation ===
- 2014: Chrome Happy Concert in Cheongju (Cheongju).
- 2014: First Chrome Family in Japan Concert (Shinagawa, Tokyo).
