= Lovers of Music =

2014 Korean television series

- Promotional poster
- Also known as: Lovers of Trot; Trot Romance
- Genre: Romance; Comedy; Drama
- Written by: Oh Sun-hyung; Kang Yoon-kyung
- Directed by: Lee Jae-sang; Lee Eun-jin
- Starring: Jung Eun-ji; Ji Hyun-woo; Shin Sung-rok; Lee Se-young
- Ending theme: "Hey Mister" by Crayon Pop
- Country of origin: South Korea
- Original language: Korean
- No. of episodes: 16

Production
- Executive producers: Kim Sung-geun; Lee Jin-suk
- Producer: Yoon Sung-sik
- Production location: Korea
- Production company: JS Pictures

Original release
- Network: KBS2
- Release: June 23 – August 12, 2014

Lovers of Music (Korean: 트로트의 연인; RR: Teuroteuui yeonin; lit. 'Trot Lovers') is a 2014 South Korean television series starring Jung Eun-ji, Ji Hyun-woo, Shin Sung-rok, and Lee Se-young. It aired on KBS2 from June 23 to August 12, 2014, on Mondays and Tuesdays at 21:55, for a total of 16 episodes.

== Plot ==
A girl's journey to become a successful singer in the old-fashioned musical genre Trot, with the help of a songwriter and music producer who detests Trot.

== Cast ==
=== Main characters ===
- Jung Eun-ji as Choi Choon-hee

Despite being in her early twenties, Choon-hee is the breadwinner of her household and She works hard to make ends meet while taking care of her father and younger sister. Her late mother was a trot singer, and Choon-hee inherited her singing talent and dreams of following in her footsteps. She gets all the practice time she can squeeze in by belting out songs in noraebangs.

- Ji Hyun-woo as Jang Joon-hyun

Joon-hyun is a genius songwriter/music producer with "top star" mainstream popularity and snobbish tastes in music. Arrogant and prickly in personality, he loathes trot which he considers lowbrow. But he later helps the no-name Choon-hee realize her dream of becoming a trot singer.

- Shin Sung-rok as Jo Geun-woo

A businessman who suddenly has to take over as CEO of his father's entertainment agency, Shine Star. Despite being cynical, he is elegant, charming and outgoing. Geun-woo signs Choon-hee as Shine Star's latest talent and later falls for her.

- Lee Se-young as Park Soo-in

Seemingly the perfect girl next door, she is a trainee at Shine Star who becomes Choon-hee's biggest rival in everything, from work to love.

=== Supporting characters ===
- Son Ho-jun as Seol Tae-song

Joon-hyun's manager. Taking his name from legendary trot singers Seol Woon-do, Tae Jin-ah and Song Dae-kwan, he too, dreams of becoming a trot singer someday.

- Shin Bo-ra as Na Pil-nyeo

Pil-nyeo has been a trainee for ten years under the agency Shine Star. At first she bosses Choon-hee around when the latter enters the company, but the two eventually become good friends.

- Lee Yi-kyung as Shin Hyo-yeol

Joon-hyun's younger colleague and rival, who holds nothing back when it comes to getting what he wants.

- Kang Nam-gil as Choi Myung-sik
- Yoo Eun-mi as Choi Byul
- Yoon Joo-sang as Jo Hee-moon
- Kim Hye-ri as Yang Joo-hee
- Kim Yeo-jin as Bang Ji-sook
- Jang Won-young as Lee Chul-man
- Yoon Bong-gil as Lee Yoo-sik
- Park Hyuk-kwon as Managing director Wang
- Jo Deok-hyun as Kim Woo-gab
- Kim Tae-gyum as Team leader Na
- Kim Bup-rae as CEO Han

=== Cameo appearances ===
- Lee Yeon-kyung as Oh Sung-joo
- Ji Soo-won as Hwa-soon
- Hong Kyung-min as MC of Survival Song (episode 5)
- Kim Hyun-chul as Himself, music program MC (episode 1)
- Yoon Gun as Audition juror (episode 2–3)
- Kim In-seok as Performer on Survival Classic (episode 5)
- Lee Eun-ha as Announcer of Survival Classic (episode 6)
- Nam Kyung-eup as Go Eun-tae
- E-Young as MC of Music Tank (episode 10)
- Lee Ka-eun as MC of Music Tank (episode 10)
- Hwang Min-hyun as MC of Music Tank (episode 10)
- Im So-yeon as Radio DJ
- Lee Chae-mi as Sibling on the beach (episode 12)
- Jeon Jun-hyeok as Sibling on the beach (episode 12)

== Ratings ==
Episode #	Original broadcast date	Average audience share			
Episode #	Original broadcast date	TNmS Ratings		AGB Nielsen	
Episode #	Original broadcast date	Nationwide	Seoul National Capital Area	Nationwide	Seoul National Capital Area
1	23 June 2014	4.8%	5.3%	5.8%	6.3%
2	24 June 2014	4.3%	4.7%	5.4%	5.7%
3	30 June 2014	6.0%	6.2%	6.1%	6.7%
4	1 July 2014	5.4%	5.7%	6.1%	6.5%
5	7 July 2014	6.6%	7.5%	6.5%	6.9%
6	8 July 2014	7.2%	8.0%	7.2%	7.4%
7	14 July 2014	7.5%	8.5%	8.3%	8.5%
8	15 July 2014	8.3%	9.3%	8.5%	9.0%
9	21 July 2014	8.3%	9.6%	8.4%	9.0%
10	22 July 2014	7.8%	8.4%	7.6%	7.8%
11	28 July 2014	7.1%	8.1%	7.5%	8.2%
12	29 July 2014	7.4%	8.3%	8.2%	8.7%
13	4 August 2014	7.8%	8.8%	9.1%	9.9%
14	5 August 2014	9.6%	10.1%	9.2%	10.0%
15	11 August 2014	8.4%	9.2%	7.3%	7.9%
16	12 August 2014	8.6%	9.7%	8.9%	9.6%
Average		7.2%	8.0%	7.5%	8.0%

== Awards and nominations ==
Year	Award	Category	Recipient	Result
2014	22nd Korea Culture and Entertainment Awards	Excellence Award, Actress in a Drama	Jung Eun-ji	Won
2014	KBS Drama Award	Excellence Award, Actress in a Miniseries	Jung Eun-ji	Nominated
2014	KBS Drama Award	Best Supporting Actor	Shin Sung-rok	Won
2014	KBS Drama Award	Best New Actor	Son Ho-jun	Nominated
2014	KBS Drama Award	Best New Actress	Jung Eun-ji	Nominated
2014	KBS Drama Award	Popularity Award, Actress	Jung Eun-ji	Won

== Original soundtrack ==
Trot Lovers: Original Sound Track

Soundtrack album by Various Artists
- Released: August 11, 2014
- Genres: Pop, K-pop, soundtrack, trot
- Labels: JS Pictures; Sony Music Korea; S90766C
- Producer: Lee Jin-seok

No.	Title	Artist	Length
1.	"헤이 미스터" (Hey Mister (S90761C))	Crayon Pop	3:19
2.	"마주보다" (I Look to You (S90762C))	Beige	3:20
3.	"미소를 띄우며 나를 보낸 그 모습처럼" (You Let Me Go With a Smile)	Kim Na-young, Lee Eun-ha	3:21
4.	"Remember Me"	Gilgubongu	3:48
5.	"펄펄 끓어요" (Boiling)	Shin Sung-rok	3:05
6.	"하루종일" (All Day)	Ji Hyun-woo	4:26
7.	"꽃향기"	Various Artists	3:30
8.	"춘희의 왈츠" (Choon-hee's Waltz)	Various Artists	2:48
9.	"이게 되겠니?"	Various Artists	1:27
10.	"좋아좋아좋아" (Good Good Good)	Various Artists	3:04
11.	"아싸 아싸"	Various Artists	2:07
12.	"돌리고 돌리고"	Various Artists	2:17
13.	"헤이 미스터 (Inst.)" (Hey Mister (Inst.))	Crayon Pop	3:19
14.	"마주보다 (Inst.)" (I Look to You (Inst.))	Beige	3:20
15.	"Remember Me (Inst.)"	Gilgubongu	3:48
