= Lonely Christmas (Crayon Pop song) =

Single by Crayon Pop
- Released: November 26, 2013
- Recorded: 2013
- Genre: K-pop; dance-pop; Disco
- Length: 2:56
- Label: Chrome Entertainment; Sony Music
- Songwriter: Kim Yoo Min

Crayon Pop singles chronology
"Bar Bar Bar" (2013)	"Lonely Christmas" (2013)	"Uh-ee" (2014)

Music video
- "Lonely Christmas" on YouTube

Audio sample
- "Lonely Christmas": file; help

"Lonely Christmas" (Korean: 꾸리스마스; RR: Kkuriseumaseu) is the third single album, and fifth single overall by Crayon Pop. It was released on November 26, 2013 by Chrome Entertainment and Sony Music. The song was a Christmas follow-up to the successful "Bar Bar Bar". Pops in Seoul described it as "a dance song with funk and disco sounds".

== Performances ==
Crayon Pop's comeback stage for "Lonely Christmas" was on Mnet's M! Countdown on December 5, 2013, and promotion continued through the end of the month. Despite being a Christmas song, it was one of the songs performed by Crayon Pop as the opening act for Lady Gaga's ArtRave: The Artpop Ball.

== Music video ==
The music video for "Lonely Christmas" was released on December 1. In this video, Crayon Pop wore outfits that resembled wrapped Christmas gifts, along with the helmets from "Bar Bar Bar", which were decorated with rhinestones and gold stars. The costumes were designed by Gu Donghyun on the OnStyle show, Fashion Killa. In other scenes of the video, Crayon Pop wore green tracksuits. The song's choreography featured a shaky leg dance called the "dog's leg dance". As of October 2014, the music video has more than six million views on YouTube.

== Criticism ==
On November 18, concept photos were released that showed the members wearing Christmas tree themed outfits. After these images were released, Crayon Pop was accused of copying the Christmas tree outfit of Momoka Ariyasu, a member of Japanese girl group Momoiro Clover Z. Chrome Entertainment responded by saying, "It is our first time learning about Momoiro Clover Z's outfit. Since we used the Christmas tree as a concept, it merely looks the same, but it's not plagiarism. Crayon Pop's Christmas tree outfit is simply for the concept photo, not for the stage performances."

After the song was released, it received plagiarism accusations because the introduction sounded similar to the opening theme for the Japanese anime Lupin the Third. Composer Kim Yoo-min responded by saying he had never heard the anime theme song, and the introduction only sounded similar because the two songs were both in the bebop genre.

== Track listing ==
No.	Title	Lyrics	Music	Length
1.	"Lonely Christmas"	Kim Yoo Min	Kim Yoo Min; Lee Seung Yup; Shin Ra Byul	2:56
2.	"Lonely Christmas" (inst.)		Kim Yoo Min; Lee Seung Yup; Shin Ra Byul	2:56
Total length:				5:52

== Charts ==
=== Singles ===
Country	Chart	Peak position
South Korea	Billboard K-Pop Hot 100	17
South Korea	Gaon Digital Chart (weekly)	12
South Korea	Gaon Digital Chart (monthly)	13
South Korea	Gaon Mobile Chart	21
South Korea	Gaon Karaoke Chart	12
South Korea	Gaon Social Chart	1

=== Album ===
Country	Chart	Peak position
South Korea	Gaon Album Chart (weekly)	6
South Korea	Gaon Album Chart (monthly)	19

=== Sales and certifications ===
Chart	Sales
Gaon physical sales	4,997+
Gaon digital sales	401,971

== Release history ==
Country	Date	Format	Label
Worldwide	November 26, 2013	Digital download	Chrome Entertainment, Sony Music
South Korea	November 27, 2013	CD	Chrome Entertainment, Sony Music
