= Bar Bar Bar =

Single by Crayon Pop
- Released: June 20, 2013
- Recorded: 2013
- Genre: K-pop
- Length: 3:00
- Label: Chrome Entertainment, CJ E&M Music
- Songwriters: Kim Yoo-min, Lee Da-kyeong

Crayon Pop singles chronology
"Dancing Queen" (2012)	"Bar Bar Bar" (2013)	"Lonely Christmas" (2013)

Music video
- "Bar Bar Bar" on YouTube

Audio sample
- file; help

"Bar Bar Bar" (Korean: 빠빠빠; RR: Ppa Ppa Ppa) is the second single album, and fourth single overall by Crayon Pop. It was released digitally on June 20, 2013 by Chrome Entertainment and distributed by CJ E&M Music. "Bar Bar Bar" became a viral hit in late July, eventually reaching number one on Billboard's K-Pop Hot 100 chart and number three on the Gaon Digital Chart.

== Release and promotion ==
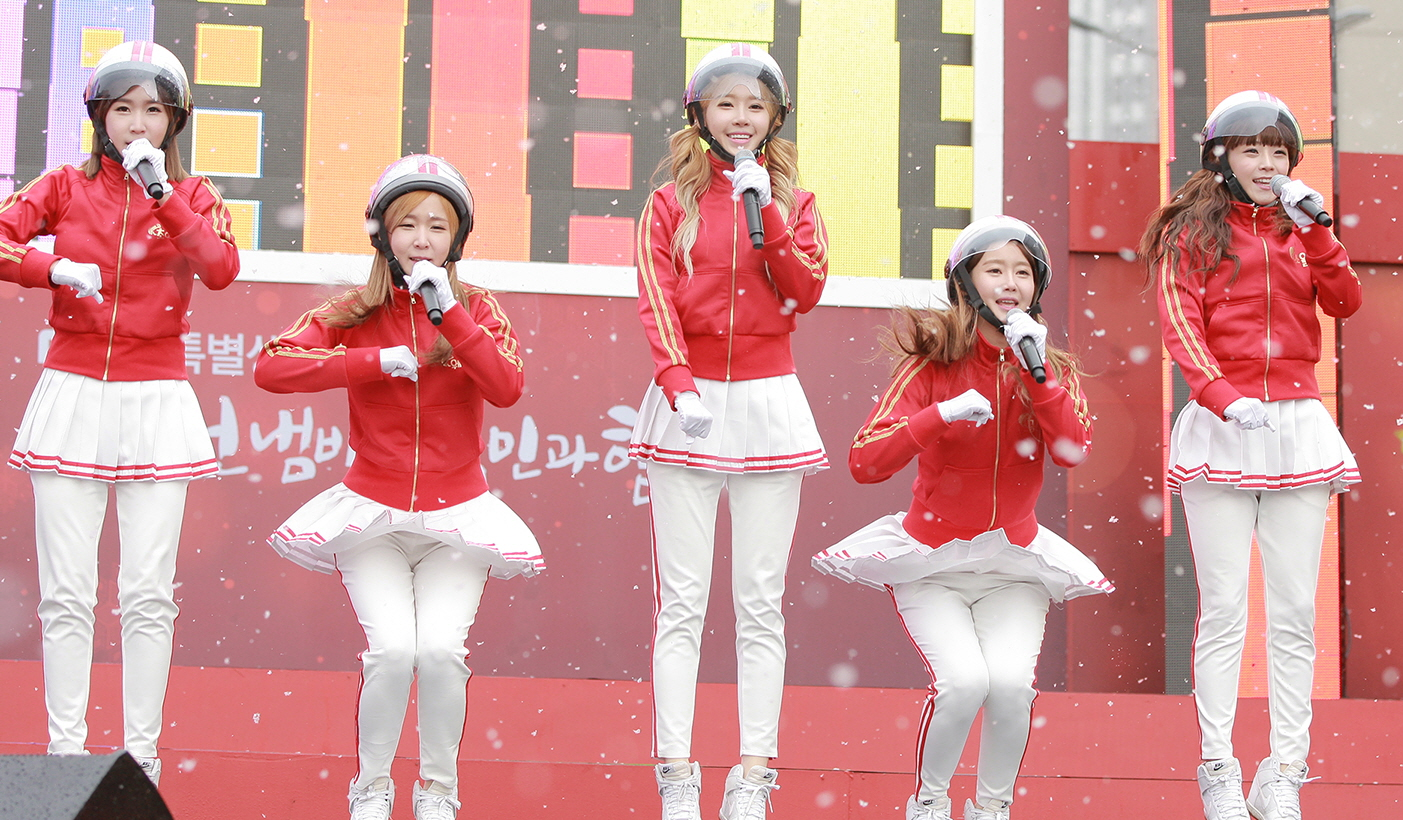
Crayon Pop performing "Bar Bar Bar" in December 2013

On June 8, Crayon Pop performed "Bar Bar Bar" for the first time at the Migliore Festival. The single album was released digitally on June 20 and a choreography music video was released three days later. Following this release, Crayon Pop's unique outfits and choreography drew interest and their popularity rose. The group wore helmets and colorful tracksuits, and the dance featured choreographed jumping, dubbed the "Straight-Five Engine Dance" by fans because it resembled the movement of engine cylinders. The song and dance were often called addictive, with easy-to-follow choreography and simple, repetitive lyrics. Member Way said, "Overall, the lyrics mean let's jump together. It's meant to give a source of energy and strength to the tired people. It just means let's all dance together and have fun."

Their first music show performance was on MBC's Music Core on June 22. The song was promoted on music shows through July and August, with the last performance being on KBS Music Bank on September 6. Crayon Pop was often in contention for first place during the month of August. They lost numerous times to Exo's "Growl" before "Bar Bar Bar" won first place on Music Bank on August 30.

== Music videos ==
The "Bar Bar Bar" story version music video was released on June 13, a week before the song's digital release. On June 23, the choreography version was released. This music video was filmed in Yongma Land, an abandoned amusement park in Jungnang-gu, with a budget of only 380,000 won (US$338). As of July 2021, the choreography music video has more than 66 million views on YouTube.

On September 9, a "Global Version" music video was released. It was aimed at an international audience and was filmed in popular locations in Seoul including Noksapyeong Station, Garosu Street, Ttukseom Hangang Park and Children's Grand Park. "Bar Bar Bar" has been compared to Psy's "Gangnam Style" and this music video contains several references to Psy's song. The audio was slightly remixed; this remix was later released as "Bar Bar Bar 2.0" on the mini album, The Streets Go Disco.

== Reception and accolades ==
"Bar Bar Bar" entered the Gaon Digital Chart at number 143 in the first week of its release. As "Bar Bar Bar" went viral, it gradually rose in the charts. In its seventh week, the song peaked at number three on the Gaon Digital Chart, and spent a total of 31 consecutive weeks on the chart. It reached number one on Billboard's K-Pop Hot 100 eight weeks after release, and was number nine on the year-end chart. Music industry officials commented that the song's chart trajectory was rare, because normally a song reaches peak position soon after release before being pushed down as time passes.

YG Entertainment's CEO Yang Hyun-suk praised Crayon Pop for having the best hit song of the first half of 2013. He said, "Other than 'Gentleman', the biggest hit was 'Bar Bar Bar'. Even my kid knows about Crayon Pop. People aren't interested about which song is at number one these days. What's important is whether people know about a singer and if they have fans. Crayon Pop succeeded in that sense". Jeff Benjamin of Billboard credited the song's success to its "quirky video, fun dance and catchy hook".

Taylor Glasby of Dazed ranked the song ninth on the publication's "Top ten K-Pop of 2013". He described the group as "simultaneously creepy and adorable" and the song as "cheekily adventurous" with an "earworm chorus" and "iconic" dance. He also said the song is "smarter than it first appears", with layered 1980s brass and 1970s disco beats. Scott Interrante, writing for PopMatters, discussed "Bar Bar Bar" in his overview of K-pop in 2013: "The song and video are bratty, obnoxious, and totally awesome. Its hallyu style is so extreme it can convincingly be taken as satire. But one thing that's certain is that it's going to get stuck in your head and annoy you probably forever."

"Bar Bar Bar" won Crayon Pop a New Rising Star award at the 28th Golden Disk Awards. It also received nominations for the Music Video Award at the MelOn Music Awards, Song of the Year and Best Dance & Electronic Song at the Korean Music Awards, and Song of the Year and Best Dance Performance - Female Group at the Mnet Asian Music Awards.

== In popular culture ==
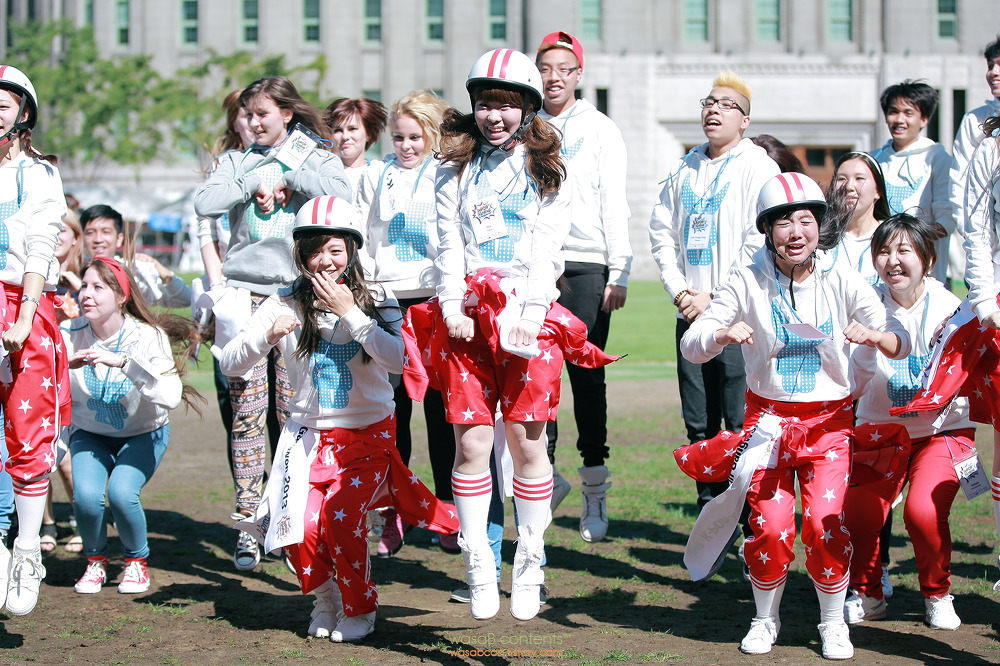
"Bar Bar Bar" flash mob at a K-pop festival in Gangwon

Many groups covered the dance or made parody videos, including M.I.B., MBLAQ, Perfume, Justice Crew and the Gyungbuk women's police department. On August 13, 2013, "Bar Bar Bar" was parodied on SNL Korea by guest Kim Gura and the SNL cast. On October 19, the song was again featured on SNL Korea, this time danced by actor Tom Hiddleston.

For Taiwanese artists, at the end of 2013, Jeannie Hsieh arranged this song with the Chinese title "阿公呷嘸飽" and took her performance on Taipei New Year's Eve Party. On February 20, 2014, a dance cover by Taiwanese twin six-year-olds, Zony and Yony, was uploaded to YouTube. This video also went viral and has more than 6 million views as of December 2014. As a result of this video, the twins were invited on The Ellen DeGeneres Show, where they performed the "Bar Bar Bar" dance.

On August 17, 2014, "Bar Bar Bar" was included in the soundtrack of the tvN historical drama, The Three Musketeers. The song was arranged in the style of traditional Korean music. On October 21, "Bar Bar Bar" was featured in the fourth episode of American TV series Selfie, with actors Karen Gillan and John Cho dancing to the song.

== Track listing ==
All music composed by Kim Yoo-min and Lee Da-kyeong. All tracks arranged by Kim and Lee Seung-yeop

No.	Title	Lyrics	Length
1.	"Bar Bar Bar"	Kim Yoo-min	3:00
2.	"Bar Bar Bar (Inst.)"		3:00
Total length:			6:00

== Charts ==
=== Weekly charts ===
Country	Chart	Peak position
South Korea	Billboard K-Pop Hot 100	1
South Korea	Gaon Digital Chart	3
South Korea	Gaon Album Chart	21
South Korea	Gaon Mobile Chart	1
South Korea	Gaon Karaoke Chart	1
South Korea	Gaon Social Chart	1
Australia	ARIA Hitseekers	14

=== Monthly charts ===
Country	Chart	Peak position
South Korea	Gaon Digital Chart	4
South Korea	Gaon Album Chart	43

=== Year-end charts ===
Country	Chart	Peak position
South Korea	Billboard K-Pop Hot 100	9
South Korea	Gaon Digital Chart	53

=== Sales and certifications ===
Chart	Sales
Gaon physical sales	4,091+
Gaon digital sales	1,162,646+

== Release history ==
Country	Date	Format	Label
South Korea	June 20, 2013	Digital download	Chrome Entertainment, CJ E&M Music
South Korea	July 9, 2013	CD single	Chrome Entertainment, CJ E&M Music
Worldwide	September 2, 2013	Digital download	Sony Music
