= Be.A =

South Korean boy band

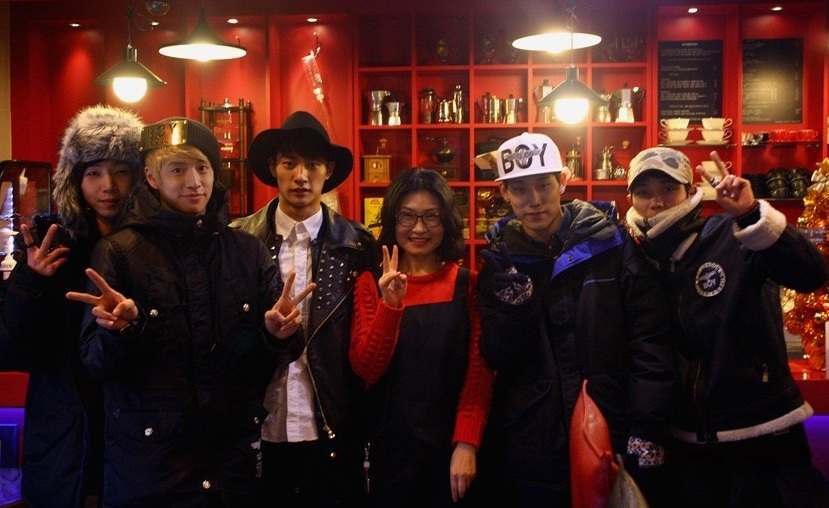
- Be.A with the manager of Busan Coffee Gallery in December 2013

Background information
- Also known as: K-Much (2014-2017)
- Origin: Seoul, South Korea
- Genre: K-pop
- Years active: 2014–2018
- Labels: Chrome Entertainment; Sony Music
- Past members: Hong-gyu; Yeong-kyun; Ato; Loki; BomB; Milly

Be.A (Korean: 비에이, shortened from Be. Artist or Be an Artist; formerly known as K-Much) was a South Korean boy band formed under Chrome Entertainment in 2014. They debuted on 7 January 2014 as K-Much with the release of their first mini album Beyond the Ocean. The group currently consists of three members: Hong-gyu, Yeong-kyun, and Ato.

The group's English name started as K-Much; their original Korean name was Gamulchi (가물치), which translates to "snakehead". The snakehead fish is a popular health food in Korea, and symbolizes longevity. In August 2014, the Korean name of the group was changed to K-Much (케이머치) to match the group's English name, but it was changed again in February 2017 to Be.A.

== History ==
=== 2013: Pre-debut ===
K-Much made their first public appearance on an episode of Crayon Pop TV on 8 September 2013. G.Low previously lived in Pennsylvania, while Ato and BornUs had been with Chrome Entertainment since Crayon Pop's debut. Both Ato and BornUs had a cameo appearance in Crayon Pop's "Saturday Night" and story version of "Bar Bar Bar" music videos. Prior to their debut, they promoted themselves in high schools throughout Korea and held street performances. K-Much featured in Crayon Pop's solo concert, 2nd POPCON in Tokyo, performing a remix of three songs. Crayon Pop's Ellin formally introduced K-Much to the public shortly before their debut.

=== 2014–2015: Beyond the Ocean, Loki's departure ===
On 7 January 2014, K-Much released their first mini album, Beyond the Ocean. The album consists of three tracks: "I'm Sorry", "What Should I Do" (나 어떡해), and the single, "Good to Go" (뭣 모르고, lit. "Don't Know Anything"). A story version music video of "Good to Go", featuring Crayon Pop's Ellin, was uploaded to YouTube on 6 January, a day before the album's release. On the same day, K-Much performed on SBS MTV's The Show: All About K-Pop!, marking their first live stage performance. K-Much made their official debut stage on 8 January 2014, performing "Good to Go" on MBC Music's Show Champion.

In late 2014, K-Much participated in the first Chrome Family project, a digital single album titled 2014 Chrome Family – A Very Special Christmas . The album was released on 3 December, as well as a music video for the single, "Love Christmas". Loki was not in the music video, and Chrome Entertainment later confirmed he had left the company to pursue an acting career. Loki's departure was amicable, and K-Much continued as a four-member group.

On 17 February 2015, K-Much pre-released the single "December 24" (12월 24일), ahead of their upcoming album. The music video featured former Hello Venus member Yoo Ara. A second song, "On the Hook" (어항 속 물고기, lit. "Fish in a Fishbowl"), was released on 6 March. Another single, "Tie My Hands", was released on 26 November.

=== 2017: Reformation as Be.A ===
In January 2017, funding site Makestar announced K-much would hold a 'Renewal Project' until 21 March. In February, it was announced through Makestar that K-Much were looking to change their group name through a fan poll. They asked fans to choose one of the three candidates named : Be.A (Be Artist/Be.A/ Become an artist), Champ (Become the Idol Champion) and B.O.T (Boy on top). On 28 February, they announced their new name had changed to Be.A. They also announced they would be making a comeback in the first half of the year with a new member. On 2 March, it was announced that Boys24 contestant previously known as Park Woo-young joined the group with the stage name BomB.

=== 2018: Europe tour ===
In February 2018, Be.A announced a European tour. However, BomB was absent from the tour photos and was unfollowed by the official account. Even though Chrome has yet to release an official statement, it is safe to say BomB is no longer a member. Furthermore, Milly was unable to attend, and had a replacement fill in for him whose name was Taeyoung. On 27 August Milly posted on his Instagram that he will no longer be promoting as a member due to music differences and the direction the group is going in. Rather he plans on promoting as a soloist.

== Members ==
=== Current ===
- Yang Hong-gyu (양홍규)
- Jung Yeong-kyun (정영균)
- Ato (아토)

=== Former ===
- Loki (로키)
- BomB (범브)
- MiLLY (밀리)

== Discography ==
=== Extended plays ===
Title	Album details	Peak chart positions	Sales
Title	Album details	KOR	Sales
Beyond the Ocean	Released: 7 January 2014; Label: Chrome Entertainment, Sony Music; Format: CD, digital download; Track listing: 1. I’m Sorry; 2. Good to Go (뭣 모르고; Mwot Moreugo); 3. What Should I Do? (나 어떡해; Na Eotteokhae); 4. I’m Sorry (Inst.); 5. Good to Go (Inst.); 6. What Should I Do? (Inst.)	23	KOR: 2,305+
Magical Realism	Released: 25 May 2017; Label: Chrome Entertainment, Sony Music; Format: CD, digital download; Track listing: 1. Magical; 2. Fantasy; 3. WhatDa (왜이래; Wae Irae); 4. Magical (Inst.)	45	–
"—" denotes releases that did not chart or were not released in that region.

=== Singles ===
Title	Year	Peak chart positions	Sales	Album
Title	Year	KOR	Sales	Album
"Good to Go"	2014	151	KOR: 10,506+ (DL)	Beyond the Ocean
"What Should I Do" (Remix)	2014	—		Non-album single
"December 24"	2015	—		Non-album single
"Fish in a Bowl"	2015	—		Non-album single
"Tie My Hands"	2015	—		Non-album single
"Magical"	2017	—		Magical Realism
"—" denotes releases that did not chart or were not released in that region.

== Videography ==
=== Music videos ===
Year	Title	Notes
2014	Good To Go (Story Ver.)	Featuring Crayon Pop's Ellin
2015	24 December	Featuring Yoo Ara
2015	On the Hook	Featuring Yoo Ara
2015	Tie My Hands	
2015	Tie My Hands (Dance Ver.)	
2017	Magical	
