= 2015 in South Korean music =

The following is a list of notable events and releases that musically occurred in 2015 in South Korea.

== Debuting and disbanded in 2015 ==
=== Debuting groups ===
- 1Punch
- April
- Bastarz
- Big Brain
- Bursters
- CLC
- Day6
- DIA
- Drinking Boys and Girls Choir
- GFriend
- iamnot
- iKon
- JJY Band
- MAP6
- MeloMance
- Monsta X
- MyB
- N.Flying
- Oh My Girl
- Playback
- Pretty Brown
- Romeo
- Rubber Soul
- Seventeen
- Snuper
- Twice
- Unicorn
- Up10tion
- VAV
- VIXX LR

=== Solo debuts ===
- Amber
- Baek Yerin
- Choa
- Dean
- Elo
- Elsie
- Horan
- Ferlyn G
- G2
- Gaeko
- G.Soul
- Goo Hara
- Jang Hyun-seung
- Jung Yong-hwa
- Junoflo
- Jonghyun
- Julian Trono
- Lee Hongki
- Lizzy
- Minah
- Miwoo
- Niel
- Park Jimin
- RM
- Shaun
- Taeyeon
- Wuno
- Lee Tae-il
- Ugly Duck
- Yezi

=== Disbanded groups ===
- 1Punch
- A-Prince
- Aziatix
- AA
- Bob Girls
- C-Clown
- EvoL
- F-ve Dolls
- Glam
- GP Basic
- Jewelry
- LC9
- M.Pire
- Shu-I
- The SeeYa
- Tiny-G
- Wonder Boyz

== Releases in 2015 ==
=== First quarter ===
==== January ====
Date	Title(s)	Artist(s)	Genre(s)
02	First	Ferlyn G	Ballad, Pop
05	Day By Day	High4	Ballad
09	Piece Of Mine	Mad Clown	Hip-hop
09	Surprise	HALO	Dance
12	Base	Jonghyun	Dance, R&B
14	Fall Into Temptation	Tahiti	Dance
15	Season of Glass	GFriend	Pop
16	Cigarette & Liquor	Untouchable	Hip-hop
19	Coming Home	G.Soul	R&B
20	One Fine Day	Jung Yong-hwa	Pop rock
21	Davichi Hug	Davichi	Ballad
21	Sing Sing Sing	Eddy Kim	Ballad
23	Drama	Nine Muses	Dance
23	Always	U-KISS	Dance
23	The Anthem	1Punch	Hip hop
26	Fly Again	Infinite H	Dance, Hip-hop
29	Sunny Blues Part.B	Sunny Hill	Dance
30	365	Hanhae	Hip-hop

==== February ====
Date	Title(s)	Artist(s)	Genre(s)
02	Young	Zion.T & Crush	R&B
05	Just One Day	JeA	Ballad
09	Crazy	4Minute	Trap, Electronic
12	Myname 2nd Mini Album	Myname	Dance, Ballad
13	Life	Rubber Soul	Dance, Hip-hop
16	oNiely	Niel	Dance
16	Beautiful	Amber	Dance, Hip-hop
23	Innocent	Rainbow	Dance
23	A Little Lovin	eSNa	R&B
24	Boys' Record	VIXX	Dance
26	Seenroot	Seenroot	Folk
26	We	Shinhwa	Dance

==== March ====
Date	Title(s)	Artist(s)	Genre(s)
02	Song For You	MC Mong	Hip-hop
03	Flower	Kim Jun-su	Ballad
03	Hi~	Lovelyz	Dance, R&B
03	Stop Love	Koyote	Hip-hop
04	Black Label	Fiestar	Dance
05	Eighteen	Shannon Williams	Dance, Ballad
06	The Beat Goes On	Donghae & Eunhyuk	Dance
09	Boyfriend in Wonderland	Boyfriend	Dance
10	Good Bye Tomorrow	Lee Ji-young	Ballad
10	Sentimental	MeloMance	Ballad
12	hawwah	Gain	Dance, R&B
12	Welcome to MADTOWN	Madtown	Dance
12	Pride & Prejudice	Outsider	Hip-hop
13	Time Forgets	Yoon Hyun-sang	Ballad
16	I Am A Woman Too	Minah	Dance, R&B
17	Snow Of April	Huh Gak	Ballad
17	Back and Forth	Giriboy	Hip-hop
17	Ice Cream Cake	Red Velvet	Pop, R&B
18	HEIIVEN	Untouchable	Hip-hop
19	First Love	CLC	Dance, Ballad
19	Wondaland	MFBTY	Dance, Hip-hop
20	Sincerely	NS Yoon-G	Dance, R&B
20	RM	RM	Hip-hop
20	Unpretty Rapstar Semi Final	Various artists	Hip-hop
23	I Will	FT Island	Rock
24	Another Progress	N-SONIC	Dance
24	Lucky You!	Primary & Ohhyuk	Hip-hop
25	RE:	K.Will	Ballad
27	FM	Crayon Pop	Dance
27	Sugar Sugar	Laboum	Dance
30	EXODUS	EXO	Dance, R&B
30	Colors	Miss A	Dance, R&B
31	Renovation	Blady	Dance

=== Second quarter ===
==== April ====
Date	Title(s)	Artist(s)	Genre(s)
01	Kim Kwang Seok Hommage My Song Part 2	Various artists	Folk
01	Unpretty Rapstar Semi Final 2	Various artists	Hip-hop
02	Rainbow Taste	Park Si-hwan	Rock
07	New Direction	Lee Moon-se	Ballad
13	Ah Yeah	EXID	Dance, Hip-hop
13	Play With Me	Cross Gene	Dance
14	Spring Love	Niel	Dance
14	Zero For Conduct	BASTARZ (Block B)	Hip-hop
15	Joker Is Alive	Dal Shabet	Dance, R&B
15	Tell Me One More Time	Jinusean	Hip-hop
15	Time-Limit	Jeong Jong-hyun	Ballad
16	I'm Not a Pigeon	Defconn	Hip-hop
16	Cottage Industry	M&D	Rock
20	Oh My Girl	Oh My Girl	Dance, Pop
20	R.O.S.E	Wooyoung (2PM)	Dance
23	The Boy Who Cried Wolf	San E	Hip-hop
23	Celepretty	Park Bo-ram	Pop, Ballad
24	EOEO	UNIQ	Hip-hop
24	Am I Hotshot?	Hotshot	Dance
24	Out	Mr.Mr	Dance
27	Simple Mind	Lim Kim	Dance, Folk
27	RelAcian	A.cian	Dance
28	Crumple	Code Kunst	Hip hop
28	Green Light	Play the Siren	Hip-hop
29	The Most Beautiful Moment In Life, Part 1	BTS	Hip-hop, R&B

==== May ====
Date	Title(s)	Artist(s)	Genre(s)
01	M (MADE Series #1)	Big Bang	Dance, Hip-hop
01	Two Of Me	Sungha Jung	Folk
07	Remember	HeartB	Ballad
07	Fantasia	Jun Hyo-seong	Dance
07	The Romeo	Romeo	Dance
08	Love Emotion	BESTie	Dance
08	My	Jang Hyun-seung	Dance
11	27	Kim Sung-kyu	Dance
12	Kiss My Lips	BoA	K-pop, R&B
12	Take Part.1	Take	Ballad
13	The 4th Single Album	Myname	Dance
14	Trespass	Monsta X	Dance, Hip-hop
14	I'm Good	Elsie	Ballad
15	Merry Go Round	Jung-yup	Ballad
18	Odd	SHINee	R&B, Electronic
19	She's Alright	Horan	Rock
20	Awesome	N.Flying	Rock
21	Beyond The History	History	Dance
22	Normal	Lim Seulong	Ballad
22	Young	Standing Egg	Folk
26	In Love	Kara	Dance
26	Time, So Quickly	Lee Seung-chul	Rock
27	Deviation	JJY Band	Rock
28	Question	CLC	Dance
28	UZ	Urban Zakapa	R&B
28	Grow Up	HALO	Dance
28	Dokkun Project	Eddy Kim	Ballad
29	17 Carat	Seventeen	Dance, Funk

==== June ====
Date	Title(s)	Artist(s)	Genre(s)
01	A (MADE Series #2)	Big Bang	Dance, Hip-hop
01	Speed On	Speed	Dance
03	Love Me Right	EXO	Dance, R&B
09	Re Birth	Seo In-young	Ballad
09	Mirror	MBLAQ	Dance
09	#LoveMe	MelodyDay	Ballad
10	And...	Lee Seung-gi	Ballad
11	LIQUID	Jang Jane	R&B
15	No.5	2PM	Dance, R&B
18	T-ROAD	Kim Tae Woo	Ballad
19	Suprassion	Jeong Jong-hyun	Dance, R&B
19	Pink Funky	Mamamoo	R&B, Funk
22	Shake It	Sistar	Dance
22	Heart Attack	AOA	Dance, Electropop
22	Natural Born Teen Top	Teen Top	Dance
23	Multillionaire	Dok2	Hip-hop
24	Studying Abroad	4Men	Ballad
25	Woman	Verbal Jint X Sanchez Phantom	Hip-hop, R&B
26	Together Forever 18	Kim Hyun Jung	Dance
29	Complete	BTOB	Ballad
29	Honey Summer	NS Yoon-G	Dance

=== Third quarter ===
==== July ====
Date	Title(s)	Artist(s)	Genre(s)
01	D (MADE Series #3)	Big Bang	Dance, Hip-hop
02	9Muses S/S Edition	9Muses	Dance
02	Love Shake	Minx	Dance
02	I'm a Hotshot	Hotshot	Dance
07	Love	Girl's Day	Pop, R&B
08	Chewy	D.Holic	Dance
13	Reality	Infinite	Dance, Electronic
13	Just Right	Got7	Dance, Hip-hop
14	Alohara	Hara	Pop
16	Devil	Super Junior	Dance, R&B
16	Pink Memory	Apink	Dance
20	Rise as God	TVXQ!	Dance, R&B
20	Vibrato	Stellar	Pop, Disco
20	Cushion	Sonamoo	Dance, Ballad
22	I'm Ill	Hello Venus	Dance, Electronic
23	Flower Bud	GFriend	Pop, Ballad
27	Ordinary	Beast	Dance, R&B
29	You're Beautiful	Yoo Seung-woo	Ballad
31	Reggae Smash (Summer Night OST)	Skull & Haha	Hip-hop

==== August ====
Date	Title(s)	Artist(s)	Genre(s)
03	Reboot	Wonder Girls	Synthpop, Retro
03	Married To The Music	SHINee	R&B, Electronic
04	So Good	T-ara	Dance, Ballad
04	I Can Sing	Lee Michelle	R&B
05	E (MADE Series #4)	Big Bang	Dance, Hip-hop
05	Hitomio Tojite	HeartB	Ballad
06	Heavy Armour	Baechigi	Hip-hop
10	Sweet Girl	B1A4	Dance
12	2	Primary	R&B
17	Beautiful Liar	Vixx LR	Dance, Hip-hop
19	Lion Heart	Girls' Generation	Pop, Electropop
19	The Voice	SG WANNABE	Ballad
20	Ackmong	JJCC	Dance
21	A+	Hyuna	Pop, Trap
21	₩ & ONLY	Simon D	Hip-hop
24	Dreaming	April	Bubblegum
25	BestDriver	Hangzoo	Hip-hop
27	That.Is.Lee.	Jo Su-mi	Drama
28	Insatiable	Beatwin	Dance
28	The Anecdote	E-Sens	Hip-hop
31	Yeoja	Verbal Jint & Sanchez	Hip-hop, R&B
31	Let's Make Love	Sweet Sorrow	Ballad

==== September ====
Date	Title(s)	Artist(s)	Genre(s)
01	Lonely 4songs	Giriboy	Hip-hop
01	Pour	DinDin	Hip-hop
02	Once Upon A Time	Unicorn	Dance
04	Shine a Moonlight	Bigstar	Dance
04	#Real#	Jun Jin	Dance
07	The Day	Day6	Pop rock
07	Rush	Monsta X	Hip-hop, Electronic
08	Ga Ga Live	Black Nut	Hip-hop
09	9X9th	LYn	R&B
09	The Red	Red Velvet	Pop, R&B
10	Chocolate	Kangnam	Ballad, Rock
10	Dirty	G.Soul	Electronica
10	Boys Be	Seventeen	Dance, Hip hop
11	Top Secret	UP10TION	Dance
14	One	Junho	Ballad, Rock
14	Love & Hate	Fly to the Sky	Ballad
14	2gether	CNBLUE	Rock
15	Do It Amazing	DIA	Dance, Ballad
15	美Story	HeartB	Ballad
15	Whoami	iamnot	Rock
16	Feeling	Roh Ji-hoon	Ballad
16	Magic	Super Junior	Dance, R&B
17	Story Op.1	Jonghyun	Ballad, R&B
18	Continue	ZE:A	Dance
21	2002	Gary	Hip-hop
22	Love Again	Im Chang-jung	Ballad
23	Piano	Yiruma	New age
29	Mad	Got7	Dance, Hip hop
30	Vivid	Ailee	Pop, R&B

=== Fourth quarter ===
==== October ====
Date	Title(s)	Artist(s)	Genre(s)
01	Welcome Back	iKon	Hip hop, Dance
01	Lovelyz8	Lovelyz	Dance, Synthpop
01	Super Fly	24K	Dance
01	3+3	Lee Seung-hwan	Ballad
01	Frameworks	Samuel Seo	Hip hop
04	Monni 10th Anniversary Best Album 'Fix' CD1	Monni	Rock
06	Return 2BiC	2BiC	Ballad
07	I	Taeyeon	Ballad, Pop rock
07	Speed Up	Melody Day	Dance
08	Closer	Oh My Girl	Electronic, dream pop
08	Incant	Bigflo	Dance
12	I Mean	BtoB	Ballad
13	Top Secret	Stephanie	Dance
15	Fall, Once Again	Kyuhyun	Pop, R&B
15	White Hole	ALi	Rock
15	1 Life 2 Live	The Quiett	Hip hop
15	For Losers Only	Sweet Sorrow	Ballad
19	Yesterday	Kim Jun-su	Dance
19	The Beat	Topp Dogg	Dance
20	The Story Begins	Twice	Dance
21	D	Kim Dong-wan	Dance
22	Monni 10th Anniversary Best Album 'Fix' CD2	Monni	Rock
22	Hero	Monsta X	Hip hop, Dance
22	Lonely	N.Flying	Rock
23	Chat Shire	IU	Disco, Pop
27	4 Walls	f(x)	Electronica, R&B
27	The First Letter	Postmen	Ballad

==== November ====
Date	Title(s)	Artist(s)	Genre(s)
02	Under the Moonlight	VAV	Hip hop
02	W.D.W	MC Mong	Hip hop
03	Hello	Gavy NJ	Ballad
03	Boys and Girls	Zico	Hip hop
04	Believe	Year 7 Class 1	Ballad, Dance
05	Basic	Brown Eyed Girls	Dance, Electropop
05	₩ORLD₩IDE	Jay Park	Hip hop
05	Zero In	Romeo	Dance
05	Demonstrate	Rania	Dance, Hip house
05	B-Kite 2	MC Sniper	Hip hop
10	Chained Up	Vixx	Dance, Ballad
10	Skip	Tahiti	Dance
12	Murphy & Sally	D.Holic	Dance
12	Once in a Lifetime	Johan Kim	K-pop
16	Matrix	B.A.P	Hip hop, R&B
16	Shall We	Snuper	Synthpop
17	Grand Carnival	Dynamic Duo	Hip hop
17	SYI	Seo In-young	Dance, Ballad
17	SBS MTV Mash Up K-Pop Remix Part.1	Various artists	Electronica
18	Hot Pink	EXID	Dance, Hip hop
18	FM302	Lee Hong-ki	Ballad
23	A Winter Fairy Tale	Huh Gak	Ballad
23	Mad Winter Edition	Got7	Dance, Hip hop
23	Monster	Park Si-hwan	Ballad
24	Lost	Nine Muses	Dance
24	I Don't Know	Raina	Ballad
25	ROAD PROJECT #1	Gill	R&B
25	Boing Boing	April	Bubblegum
27	W	Dongwan	Dance
27	BRAVO!	UP10TION	Dance
27	After Sunset, White Night	Yim Jae-beom	R&B, Rock
30	The Most Beautiful Moment In Life, Part 2	BTS	Hip hop, R&B
30	Frank	Baek Ye-rin	R&B, Ballad

==== December ====
Date	Title (s)	Artist (s)	Genre (s)
1	Chiljip Psy-da	Psy	Hip hop
1	3.3	Royal Pirates	Rock
1	B-Hind (Live Compilation BBANG Club 4)	Various artists (Cogason)	Rock, Electronica
2	Unpretty Rapstar 2 Vol.2 Compilation	Various artists	Hip hop
3	Young Love	HALO	Dance
3	#REAL# In LA	Jun Jin	Dance, Ballad
4	The Great Dipper	Roy Kim	Ballad
4	Dear Santa	Girls' Generation-TTS	Pop, Christmas
4	Inner	Standing Egg	Folk
6	Aalow Aalow	Laboum	Dance, Funk
7	Gallery	Zico	Hip hop
7	Lovelinus	Lovelyz	Dance, Ballad
8	Home (Soul Cooke)	Brown Eyed Soul	R&B
10	Sing For You	EXO	R&B, Ballad
14	Here's To Youth	J.Heart	Dance
15	Someone, Somewhere	Lucid Fall	Folk
16	Make.D	Davichi	Ballad
16	Yolhoon	Yi Sung-yol & DJ Clazzi	Rock
16	BC Street Box Project	Various Artists (Dillon)	Rock, New Age
17	A Day Without Sound	Choi In-young, Koo Hye-sun	Ballad
18	Age Of Innocence	Im Tae-kyung	Ballad
18	29	DickPunks	Rock
19	Go Hard Part 1: Amount Value	Verbal Jint	Hip hop
21	Snowman	April	Christmas
21	Again	Turbo	Dance, Hip hop
22	Mixtape "MADMAX"	Vasco	Hip hop
23	Confession	Postmen	Ballad
23	You Are My	5tion	Ballad
24	Welcome Back	iKon	Hip hop, Dance
28	When It Rains	Melody Day	Ballad

== See also ==
- 2015 in South Korea
- List of South Korean films of 2015
