= 2014 in South Korean music =

The following is a list of notable events and releases that happened in 2014 in music in South Korea.

== Notable events and achievements ==
- January 16 – Exo and Psy win the Album and Digital Daesangs, respectively, at the Golden Disc Awards.
- January 23 – The 23rd Seoul Music Awards take place. Exo wins the grand prize.
- February 28 – Sunwoo Jung-a, Cho Yong-pil and Yoon Young-bae win the grand prizes at the annual Korean Music Awards.
- March 11 – With the release of Tree, TVXQ becomes the first foreign band in Japan to have three consecutive studio albums with first-week sales of over 200,000 copies, breaking Bon Jovi's thirteen-year record.
- March 15 – 2NE1's Crush becomes the first album by a Korean artist to chart within the top 100 on the Billboard 200, entering at number 61. It also marked the first time two K-pop artists appeared on the chart at the same time, along with Girls' Generation's Mr.Mr.
- May 7 – Exo's Overdose records nearly 660,000 pre-orders, breaking the record at the time for most pre-orders for a single album in K-pop.
- June 12 – Taeyang's Rise becomes the highest-charting album on the Billboard 200 at the time by a K-pop solo artist, peaking at number 112.
- June 23 – TVXQ become the first international artist in Japan to bring in the largest number of concertgoers in the previous three years, reaching over 2 million total attendees during the timeframe.
- July 14 – Through three concert tours in Japan since 2011, Girls' Generation attracted a cumulative total of 550,000 spectators, setting a record for a K-pop girl group.
- September 21 – Super Junior become the first Korean artist to perform a total of 100 concerts worldwide.
- September 30 – SM Entertainment announces Jessica's departure from Girls' Generation.
- October 11 – "I Am the Best" by 2NE1 becomes the first song by a K-pop group to top the World Digital Song Sales chart, following its usage in Microsoft's Surface Pro 3 advertisement campaign in the US.
- November 13 – IU, g.o.d, and Taeyang win the grand prizes at the 2014 Melon Music Awards.
- November 17 – The 5th Korean Popular Culture and Arts Awards take place. Myeong Kook-hwan is awarded with the Bogwan (Precious Crown) Order of Cultural Merit; Kim Kwang-seok, I Yu-sin, Hong Seung-seong and Yoo Young-jin are awarded with the Presidential Commendation; and Jin Mi-ryeong receives the Prime Minister's Commendation.
- December 1 – Psy's "Gangnam Style" surpasses 2.15 billion views, forcing YouTube to upgrade to a 64-bit integer counter.
- December 3 – Exo and Taeyang receive the grand prizes at the 2014 MAMA.
- December 22 – Crush becomes the first K-pop album to appear on the year-end Billboard World Albums listing since the chart began in 1995.

== Award shows and festivals ==
=== Award ceremonies ===
2014 music award ceremonies in South Korea
Date	Event	Host
January 16, 2014	28th Golden Disc Awards	Ilgan Sports and JTBC Plus
January 23, 2014	23rd Seoul Music Awards	Sports Seoul
February 12, 2014	3rd Gaon Chart Music Awards	Korea Music Content Association
February 28, 2014	10th Korean Music Awards	Korean Popular Music Awards Committee
November 13, 2014	6th Melon Music Awards	Kakao M
November 17, 2014	5th Korean Popular Culture and Arts Awards	Korea Creative Content Agency
December 3, 2014	16th Mnet Asian Music Awards	CJ E&M (Mnet)

=== Festivals ===
2014 televised music festivals in South Korea
Date	Event	Host
December 21, 2014	SBS Gayo Daejeon	Seoul Broadcasting System (SBS)
December 26, 2014	KBS Song Festival	Korean Broadcasting System (KBS)
December 31, 2014	MBC Gayo Daejejeon	Munhwa Broadcasting Corporation (MBC)

== Debuting and disbanded in 2014 ==
=== Debuting groups ===
- 2000 Won
- 4L
- 4Ten
- 5urprise
- AKMU
- Almeng
- B.I.G
- Badkiz
- Beatwin
- Berry Good
- Big Byung (Hitmaker)
- Bigflo
- Bob Girls
- Bursters
- D.Holic
- GD X Taeyang
- Got7
- HALO
- HeartB
- High4
- Hi Suhyun
- Hotshot
- Infinite F
- JJCC
- K-Much
- Laboum
- Lip Service
- Lovelyz
- Madtown
- Mamamoo
- Melody Day
- Minx
- Play the Siren
- Rainbow Blaxx
- Red Velvet
- Sonamoo
- Spica.S
- The Barberettes
- The Legend
- Toheart
- Troy
- UNIQ
- Wings
- Winner
- Year 7 Class 1

=== Solo debuts ===
- Cheetah
- Crush
- Euna Kim
- Gary
- G2
- Ha:tfelt
- Heize
- Hyomin
- Hyoseong
- J-Min
- Jiyeon
- Jung Seung-hwan
- Kidoh
- Kim Yeon-ji
- Kyuhyun
- Lee Michelle
- Microdot
- Nicole
- Penomeco
- Raina
- Shannon
- Suran
- Taemin
- Zick Jasper
- Zico

=== Disbanded groups ===
- 8Eight
- Gangkiz
- N.EX.T
- Puretty
- She'z
- Skarf

== Releases in 2014 ==
=== First quarter ===
==== January ====
Date	Title	Artist	Genre(s)
02	Unveiling	MC the Max	Ballad, Rock
02	Rain Effect	Rain	Electronica, R&B
03	Girl's Day Everyday 3	Girl's Day	Pop, R&B
06	Tense	TVXQ	Pop, R&B
07	Beyond the Ocean	K-Much	Dance
08	B.B.B	Dal Shabet	Dance, Electropop
13	I Am Rumble Fish	Rumble Fish	Rock
13	Listen & Repeat	BMK	Ballad, R&B
13	Who Am I	B1A4	Dance, Ballad
13	After the 11th	Zia	Ballad
15	Mr. Gae	Gary	Hip-hop
16	Miniskirt	AOA	Dance, R&B
16	Arario	Topp Dogg	Hip-hop
20	RB Blaxx	Rainbow Blaxx	Dance, Ballad
20	Got It?	Got7	Hip-hop, Trap
20	WWW Removing My Makeup	Jaejoong	Ballad
29	Such a Woman	Zia	Ballad

==== February ====
Date	Title	Artist	Genre(s)
03	First Sensibility	B.A.P	Dance, Hip-hop
06	M+10	Lee Minwoo	Dance
06	Truth Or Dare	Gain	Dance, Ballad
07	Rain Effect Special Edition	Rain	Electronica, R&B
12	Skool Luv Affair	BTS	Hip-hop, R&B
12	Marionette	Stellar	Dance, Pop
13	Breath	SM the Ballad	Ballad
14	Between Calm And Passion	Bebop	Rock
16	Beep Beep	BTOB	Dance, Hip-hop
16	Full Moon	Sunmi	Ballad, Electronica
19	Speed Circus	Speed	Dance
20	Fantasy Trilogy	Boys Republic	Dance
24	Can't Stop	CNBLUE	Rock
24	Mr.Mr.	Girls' Generation	Electropop, R&B
24	Arario Special Album	Topp Dogg	Dance, Hip-hop
25	Attention	AlphaBAT	Dance
27	Crush	2NE1	Electronica, Hip-hop
27	Spellbound	TVXQ	Pop, R&B
27	Newton's Apple	Nell	Rock

==== March ====
Date	Title	Artist	Genre(s)
10	Special Man	Lunafly	Rock
12	Catallena	Orange Caramel	Synthpop, Disco
17	Bang The Bush	100%	Dance
17	4Minute World	4Minute	Dance, Electropop
18	Follow My Voice	Monni	Rock
21	Swing	Super Junior-M	Pop, R&B
24	Broken	MBLAQ	Dance, Ballad
31	Pink Blossom	A Pink	Dance
31	The Maginot Line	M.I.B	Dance, Hip-hop

=== Second quarter ===
==== April ====
Date	Title	Artist	Genre(s)
1	Yashishi	NS Yoon-G	Dance
1	Uh-ee	Crayon Pop	Dance, House
2	Sometimes	Crush	R&B
3	Look At Me Now	Speed	Dance
4	Fierce	Mad Clown	Hip-hop
7	Play	Akdong Musician	Folk-pop
9	Scent of NC.A	NC.A	Dance
11	The Manual	Eddy Kim	Ballad
17	Jackpot	Block B	Dance, Hip-hop

==== May ====
Date	Title	Artist	Genre(s)
7	Overdose	Exo-K	R&B, Electronic
12	Top Secret	Hyoseong	Dance, R&B
12	The Best Man	Wheesung	R&B
13	1998	4Men	Ballad
14	Skool Luv Affair Special Addition	BTS	Hip-hop, R&B
15	Rumour	M.Pire	Dance
15	May	Bay.B	Dance
16	A Flower Bookmark	IU	Ballad
20	Continuum	Fly to the Sky	Ballad
20	Never Ever	Jiyeon	Dance, Electropop
21	Season 2	Infinite	Dance, R&B
21	Phantom Power	Phantom	Ballad, Hip-hop
22	Love Letter	Berry Good	Dance, Ballad
26	Sugar	15&	R&B, Pop
27	Eternity	VIXX	Dance, Electronic
29	Emotion	Jung Key	Ballad

==== June ====
Date	Title	Artist	Genre(s)
2	First Homme	ZE:A	Dance
2	Mono Scandal	U-KISS	Dance, Ballad
3	Rise	Taeyang	R&B
3	B.A.P Unplugged 2014	B.A.P	Ballad, Hip-hop
3	That's What They Say	Rosemary	Rock
5	Crush on You	Crush	R&B, hip hop
9	Amadeus	Topp Dogg	Dance, Hip-hop
9	Obsession	Boyfriend	Dance, Ballad
9	Pop Beyond	N-Sonic	Dance
9	I Loved Have No Regrets	Gummy	Ballad, R&B
10	No Way	Bob Girls	Dance
12	Oppa You're Mine	Tahiti	Dance
16	Good Luck	Beast	Dance, R&B
18	Hello	Mamamoo	R&B, Retro
19	Short Hair	AOA	Dance, Electropop
23	Got Love	GOT7	Dance, Hip-hop
23	Desire	History	Dance
23	First Flow	Bigflo	Dance
26	38°C	HALO	Dance
30	Make Up	Hyomin	Dance, Electropop

=== Third quarter ===
==== July ====
Date	Title	Artist	Genre(s)
7	Sun Kiss	100%	Dance
7	Red Light	f(x)	Electropop
8	Chapter 8	g.o.d	R&B, Hip-hop
8	Let's Love	C-Clown	Dance
9	Re:Birth	NU'EST	Dance, Ballad
11	Timing	Kim Hyun Joong	Dance
14	Solo Day	B1A4	Dance
14	Fantastic	Henry	Pop
14	Everyday 4	Girl's Day	Pop
18	Shine	J-Min	Rock, Acoustic
21	Touch & Move	Sistar	Dance, Electropop
22	Be Back	Infinite	Dance, R&B
22	Cube	Daybreak	Rock
23	Pour Les Femmes	Homme	R&B
24	H.E.R	Block B	Dance, Hip-hop
28	A Talk	Hyuna	Electronic, Pop
28	Hot Baby	BESTie	Dance
29	Just Us	JYJ	R&B, Pop
31	Me?	Ha:tfelt	R&B, Pop

==== August ====
Date	Title	Artist	Genre(s)
11	Secret Summer	Secret	Dance
12	2014 S/S	Winner	Pop, Ballad
18	Day & Night	Kara	Dance, R&B
18	My Copycat	Orange Caramel	Pop
18	Ace	Taemin	Dance, Ballad
20	Dark & Wild	BTS	Hip-hop, R&B
21	Sunny Blues Part A	Sunny Hill	Dance
21	JJCC 1st Mini Album	JJCC	Dance
21	Upgrade	Lip Service	Dance
22	Answer	AlphaBat	Dance
26	Sweet & Sour	Sistar	Pop
27	Hi High	High4	Dance
28	Petit Macaron	Laboum	Dance
29	Mamacita	Super Junior	R&B, Pop
29	I Need You	Bestie	Dance

==== September ====
Date	Title	Artist	Genre(s)
1	Evolution	Jay Park	Hip-hop
11	And & End	T-ARA	Electronic
15	Go Crazy	2PM	Electronic, R&B
15	Éxito	Teen Top	Pop
15	Hello Boy	N*White	Dance
16	Holler	Girls' Generation-TTS	R&B, Pop
17	Bargaining For Love	F.Cuz	Dance
25	Magazine	Ailee	R&B, Pop
26	Small Album	Kidoh	Dance
29	Move	BTOB	Dance
29	I Think I'm In Love	Juniel	Rock
29	Electric Dream	Beat Burger	Electronica
30	Making a New Ending for this Story	Han Dong-geun	Ballad

=== Fourth quarter ===
==== October ====
Date	Title	Artist	Genre(s)
1	Walking With	Kim Dong-ryool	Ballad
6	Mad Town	Madtown	Dance, Hip-hop
6	Falling in Fall	Zia	Ballad
6	The End	Lee Ye Joon	Ballad
7	She	Gavy NJ	Ballad
7	Pure	Aurora	Trot
8	Home	Roy Kim	Folk
8	Reset	Raina	Ballad
8	Begin	Jung Dong Ha	Ballad
9	Song for You	Lee Min-ho	Ballad
10	Time	Toxic	Rock
13	Witch	Boyfriend	Dance
13	I'm...	Bernard Park	Ballad
14	Error	VIXX	Dance
14	25	Song Ji-eun	Dance, Ballad
15	Rilla Go!	The Boss	Dance
15	The 1st Mini Album	Strawberry Milk	Dance, Ballad
15	I Miss You	Girl's Day	Ballad
16	Redingray	Gaeko	Hip-hop
20	Quiet Night	Seo Taiji	Rock
20	Time	Beast	R&B, Ballad
21	Composing of Love	Almeng	R&B
21	Shoebox	Epik High	Hip-hop
23	This Is Love	Super Junior	R&B, Pop
27	Autumm Breeze	S	Ballad
30	Let's Talk	2AM	Ballad
30	Out of My Mind	The Legend	Dance
31	Rewind	Zhou Mi	Dance, Ballad
31	Pianoforte	Yoon Hyun-sang	Ballad
31	Ouch	A.cian	Dance

==== November ====
Date	Title	Artist	Genre(s)
3	Petit Macaron: Data Pack	Laboum	Dance
3	Miss Me or Diss Me	MC Mong	Hip-hop
5	Life Note	Hong Jin-young	Trot
10	20’s Love Two Éxito	Teen Top	Dance
11	Like a Cat	AOA	Dance
12	Real Talk	Boys Republic	Dance
12	04	Urban Zakapa	Ballad
12	Turning Point	Ali	Ballad
13	At Gwanghwamun	Kyuhyun	Ballad
13	Babomba	Badkiz	Dance
13	Sora Sora	Pritz	Dance
14	Self-Hypnosis	Maboos	Hip-hop
14	Wa	Atomic Kiz	Dance
17	Girls' Invasion	Lovelyz	Dance, R&B
18	From My Heart	5urprise	Dance
18	Identify	Got7	Dance, Hip hop
18	Da Capo	You Hee-yeol	Ballad
19	3.0	10cm	Rock
19	rejoyce	Ulala Session	Ballad
19	First Romance	Nicole Jung	Dance
20	Hello Halo	HALO	Dance
21	Exhale	Lee Joon-gi	Ballad
21	Him	Kim Bum-soo	Dance, Ballad
21	Good Boy	GD X Taeyang	Electrohop, Hip hop
24	Pink Luv	Apink	Dance, Ballad
24	Happy Together	Park Hyo-shin	Ballad
24	My All	Zest	Dance
25	Showtime	Wassup	Dance, Hip-hop
25	Winter	MBLAQ	Ballad
26	Second Flow	Bigflo	Dance
26	Memorize	Buzz	Rock
26	Genuine	2BiC	Ballad
27	2nd Mini 白	Baek Chung-kang	Ballad
28	Locomotive	Loco	Hip-hop

==== December ====
Date	Title	Artist	Genre(s)
1	Blue	Infinite F	Pop
5	She	Monni	Rock
5	Kiss Me	Standing Egg	Indie folk
5	The Duets (part 1)	Yoon Sang	Pop, Electronica
9	Winter Wonderland	Sung Si-kyung	Ballad, Christmas
15	White Letter	DSP Friends	Pop, Christmas
22	The Winter's Tale	BtoB	Ballad, Christmas
23	Genuine	2BiC	Ballad
24	Special Day	Bepop	Rock
29	Deja Vu	Sonamoo	Dance

== Deaths ==
- Yoo Chae-yeong, 40, singer and actress
- Kwon Ri-se, 23, singer (Ladies' Code)
- Kim Ja-ok, 63, actress and singer
- Go Eun-bi, 21, singer (Ladies' Code)
- Shin Hae-chul, 46, singer (N.EX.T)

== See also ==
- 2014 in South Korea
- List of South Korean films of 2014
