= Sweet Rendezvous =

EP by Nine Muses
- Released: March 8, 2012
- Recorded: Seoul, South Korea; 2011–2012
- Genres: K-pop, dance-pop
- Length: 19:37
- Labels: Star Empire Entertainment; LOEN Entertainment

Nine Muses chronology
Let’s Have A Party (2010)	Sweet Rendezvous (2012)	Dolls (2013)

Singles from Sweet Rendezvous
- 1. "Figaro" Released: August 18, 2011; 2. "News" Released: January 11, 2012; 3. "Ticket" Released: March 8, 2012 (Promotional single)

Sweet Rendezvous is the first EP by the South Korean girl group Nine Muses. It was released on March 8, 2012, with the song "Ticket" as the promotional song.

== Background ==
Rumors of the comeback of the group started on February 21, 2012, speculating that the group was going to come back with a new digital single. On March 2, a teaser photo of the member Euaerin was revealed. In the photo, Euaerin seems to be unclothed underneath the giant ticket that covers her up, stamped with the words "Ticket", the name of the group "Nine Muses" and a date "20120308", which could be a possibility to be the concept and day of release, on March 8. On March 5, it was confirmed the new release is their debut mini-album by revealing the physical EP cover. On the same day, it was revealed the track list of the EP, which features two already released digital singles "Figaro", released on August 11, 2011, and "News", released on January 11, 2012, two new songs "Ticket", "Who R U" and their instrumentals. On March 6, more photos of the concept were revealed.

== Composition ==
All songs from the EP were written by Song Soo Yun and composed by Han Jae-Ho and Kim Seung-Soo (also known as Sweetune). They are also known for producing songs for the groups Infinite (Be Mine, Paradise, Cover Girl), KARA (Mister, Lupin, Jumping, Step and more), Rainbow (A, Mach), f(x) (Love) and more.

== Music video ==
A teaser of the music video for "Ticket" was released on March 6, 2012. The full music video was released on March 8, 2012, along with the EP release. A special "V Line" dance version was released on YouTube by their company, Star Empire Entertainment, on March 22.

== Promotions ==
Promotions of the song "Ticket" started on March 8, on Mnet's show M! Countdown. The song was also promoted on the shows Music Bank, Music Core and Inkigayo. The promotions ended one month later, on April 8, on SBS's Inkigayo.

== Track listing ==
All lyrics are written by Song Soo Yun; all music is composed by Han Jae-Ho and Kim Seung-Soo.

Official track list
No.	Title	Length
1.	"Who R U" (넌 뭐니; Neon Mwoni)	3:20
2.	"Ticket" (티켓; Tiket)	3:12
3.	"News" (뉴스; Nyuseu)	3:02
4.	"Figaro" (휘가로; Hwigalo)	3:19
5.	"Who R U" (instrumental)	3:19
6.	"Ticket" (instrumental)	3:12
Total length:		19:37

== Charts ==
=== Album chart ===
Chart (2012)	Peak position
Gaon Weekly albums chart	6
Gaon Monthly albums chart	21

=== Single chart ===
Song	Peak chart position	
Song	KOR	KOR
Song	Gaon Chart	K-Pop Billboard
"Ticket"	33	41
"News"	36	46
"Figaro"	66	82

=== Sales ===
Chart	Sales
Gaon physical sales	4,100+ (South Korea)

== Release history ==
Country	Date	Distributing label	Format
South Korea	March 8, 2012	LOEN Entertainment; Star Empire Entertainment	CD, Digital download
