= Prima Donna (Nine Muses album) =

- From top: Lee Sem, Eunji and Kyungri. From lower: Sera, Sungah, Hyemi and Hyuna. From bottom: Minha and Euaerin.

Studio album by Nine Muses
- Released: October 14, 2013
- Recorded: 2011; 2012–2013
- Studios: Seoul, South Korea
- Genres: K-pop; dance-pop
- Length: 33:24
- Labels: Star Empire Entertainment; LOEN Entertainment
- Producers: Sweetune, Mojo Sound

Nine Muses chronology
| Wild (2013) | Prima Donna (2013) | Drama (2015) |

Singles from Prima Donna
- 1. "Gun" Released: October 14, 2013

Prima Donna (stylized as PRIMA DONNA) is the only studio album by South Korean girl group Nine Muses, released on October 14, 2013, through Star Empire Entertainment. A majority of the album's production is by Han Jae-ho and Kim Seung-soo, also known as Sweetune, who have worked with the group since their 2011 single "Figaro".

In September 2013, the group announced that they will be starting a new promotional cycle with their first full-length album after the chuseok holidays. The album's track list was revealed on September 26, 2013. Various teaser images and jacket photos for Prima Donna were released in the first week of October, along with an audio preview of all eleven tracks on October 9, 2013. The album debuted at number seven on the Gaon Albums Chart.

Prima Donna's lead track, "Gun", contains retro influences with a western beat, featuring a brass and blues feel with an electronic guitar. The single charted on the Gaon charts at number sixteen.

== Background ==
In September 2013, a Star Empire Entertainment official stated that ZE:A's label-mates Nine Muses would start promotions in the second half of the year. The group confirmed this in an interview with Star News, where member Hyuna shared that they recently shot the album cover and are currently practicing their choreography, with this year's chuseok being "more of a period of preparation for our album rather than a holiday". Minha said that the album will have songs they haven't tried before, and as there are many tracks, the nine members "fused their individual charms to become one".

The album's name and release date was revealed a week later on September 26, 2013, along with a track list of eleven songs.

== Singles ==
"Gun" was promoted as the lead single from Prima Donna. It was produced by Han Jae-ho and Kim Seung-soo with lyrics by Song Soo-yun. Featuring "sixties guitar riffs" and "jazzy horns", the song has been compared to Rainbow's 2010 single "A". A three-second preview of "Gun" can be heard at the end of a mash-up of the group's past singles, released onto YouTube on September 30, 2013. A teaser of the song's official music video was released on October 7, 2013, which featured the album's title track. Nine Muses began promoting the single on Korea's televised music shows a few days later, performing "Gun" for the first time on the October 11, 2013 broadcast of Mnet's M! Countdown. The official music video for "Gun" premiered on October 14, 2013, which was filmed at a sandy, deserted location with a reed forest; featuring a gas station set. Member Lee Sem said that she "felt like [she] was filming a movie".

== Track listing ==
Prima Donna
| No. | Title | Lyrics | Music | Length |
|---|---|---|---|---|
| 1. | "Prima Donna (Intro)" | Ahn Jun-sung | Ahn Jun-sung, Hong Seung-hyeon | 1:07 |
| 2. | "Gun" | Song Su-yun | Kim Seung-su, Han Jae-ho, Hong Seung-hyeon | 2:57 |
| 3. | "세치혀 (Rumor)" | Song Su-yun | Hwang Hye-on, Hong Seung-hyeon | 3:07 |
| 4. | "A Few Good Man" | Song Su-yun | Go Nam-soo, Kim Seung-u, Han Jae-ho, Hong Seung-hyeon | 2:58 |
| 5. | "Last Scene" | Song Su-yun, Shin Agnes | Kim Seung-su, Choo Dae-gwan, Han Jae-ho, Hong Seung-hyeon | 3:34 |
| 6. | "천생여자" (Just a Girl) | Song Su-yun | Kim Seung-su, Ahn Jun-seong, Han Jae-ho, Hong Seung-hyeon | 3:14 |
| 7. | "Miss Agent" | Jeong Yeong-eun | Kim Tae-hyeon, Lee Yu-jin | 3:16 |
| 8. | "Time's Up" | Lee Ju-hyeong, G-High | Lee Ju-hyeong, Hong Seung-hyeon, G-HIGH | 3:18 |
| 9. | "몰라몰라 (OMG)" | Sijin, Rhymer | Rhymer, MasterKey | 3:20 |
| 10. | "핑" (Dizzy) | Jeong Chang-wook, Ham Seung-hyo | Jeong Chang-wook, Ham Seung-hyo | 3:11 |
| 11. | "아님 말구" (Whatever) | Hong Ji-yu | Lee Chang-hyeon | 3:00 |
| Total length: | | | | 33:24 |

== Charts ==
=== Album chart ===
| Charts (2013) | Peak position |
|---|---|
| Gaon Weekly albums charts | 7 |
| Gaon Monthly albums charts | 21 |

=== Sales ===
| Chart | Sales |
|---|---|
| Gaon physical sales | 7,204+(South Korea) |

== Release history ==
| Country | Date | Distributing label | Format |
|---|---|---|---|
| South Korea | October 14, 2013 | LOEN Entertainment; Star Empire Entertainment | CD, digital download |
