= Almeng =

South Korean musical duo

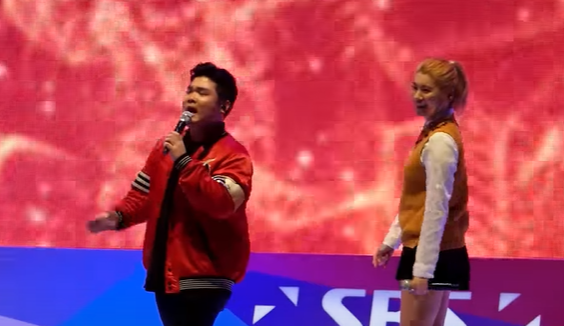

Background information
- Origin: South Korea
- Genres: K-pop, hip hop, R&B
- Years active: 2013–present
- Members: Choi Rin; Lee Hae-yong

Almeng (Korean: 알맹) is a South Korean singing duo known for appearing on the reality television competition show K-pop Star Season 3. The duo consists of Choi Rin and Lee Hae-Young. They released their debut extended play, compoSing of Love, on October 21, 2014.

== Discography ==
=== Extended plays ===
Title	Album details	Peak chart positions	Sales
Title	Album details	KOR	Sales
compoSing of Love	Released: October 21, 2014; Label: YNB Entertainment; Formats: CD, digital download; Track listing: 1. Intro; 2. Half an Hour; 3. Phone in Love; 4. Poor Girl feat. Loco; 5. Fool Boy; 6. Again	42	

=== Singles ===
Title	Year	Peak chart positions	Sales (DL)	Album
Title	Year	KOR	Sales (DL)	Album
As lead artist
"Let's Forget" (잊자...)	2014	69		Three Days OST
"Phone In Love" (폰인러브)	2014	78		compoSing of Love
"Yes I Do"	2015	73		Non-album single
"Cheers To Me"	2016	—		Non-album single
"Pillow"	2018	—		Non-album single
"Chic Sick"	2018	—		Non-album single
"사실 음(Umm)"	2019	—		Non-album single
"Say No more"	2020	—		Non-album single
"—" denotes releases that did not chart.
