= Speed Circus =

SPEED Circus

EP by Speed
- Released: February 18, 2014
- Recorded: Core Contents Media
- Genre: K-pop; dance-pop
- Length: 15:34
- Language: Korean
- Label: Core Contents Media; KT Music
- Producer: Shinsadong Tiger; Radio Galaxi

Speed chronology
Superior SPEED (2013)	SPEED Circus (2014)	SPEED On (2015)

Singles from SPEED Circus
- 1. "Focus (Taewoon Solo)" Released: February 17, 2014; 2. "Why I'm Not?" Released: February 19, 2014; 3. "Don’t Tease Me!" Released: February 20, 2014

Repackage EP
- Re-package cover

Singles from Look At Me Now
- 1. "Zombie Party!" Released: March 18, 2014; 2. "Look At Me Now" Released: April 3, 2014

SPEED Circus is the first mini album (EP) by South Korean boy group Speed. The mini album was preceded by promotional singles "Don’t Tease Me!" It was the last album to feature Taewoon due to his departure the following year.

== Track listing ==
SPEED Circus
No.	Title	Lyrics	Music	Arrangement	Length
1.	"왜 난 꼭" (Wae nan kkok, Why I’m not?)	Tae-woon of Speed, Radio Galaxi	Tae-woon of Speed, Radio Galaxi	Radio Galaxi	3:25
2.	"놀리러 간다" (Nulrireo ganda, Don’t Tease Me!)	Tae-woon of Speed	Tae-woon of Speed, I AM	Radio Galaxi, Shinsadong Tiger	3:18
3.	"Hey Ma Lady"	Tae-woon of Speed	Tae-woon of Speed, Radio Galaxi	Radio Galaxi	3:14
4.	"Focus" (Taewoon solo)	Tae-woon of Speed	Radio Galaxi	Radio Galaxi	2:19
5.	"놀리러 간다" (Nullireo ganda (Don’t Tease Me!) (Vocal ver.))	Tae-woon of Speed	Tae-woon of Speed, I AM	Radio Galaxi, Shinsadong Tiger	3:18
Total length:					15:34

Look At Me Now
No.	Title	Lyrics	Music	Arrangement	Length
1.	"Look At Me Now"	Shinsadong Tiger, White Bear	Shinsadong Tiger, White Bear	Shinsadong Tiger	3:47
2.	"Zombie Party!"	Tae-woon of Speed	Tae-woon of Speed, Radio Galaxi	Radio Galaxi	3:22
3.	"놀리러 간다" (Nulrireo ganda, Don’t Tease Me!)	Tae-woon of Speed	Tae-woon of Speed, I AM	Radio Galaxi, Shinsadong Tiger	3:18
4.	"왜 난 꼭" (Wae nan kkok, Why I’m not?)	Tae-woon of Speed, Radio Galaxi	Tae-woon of Speed, Radio Galaxi	Radio Galaxi	3:25
5.	"Focus" (Taewoon solo)	Tae-woon of Speed	Radio Galaxi	Radio Galaxi	2:19
6.	"Hey Ma Lady"	Tae-woon of Speed	Tae-woon of Speed, Radio Galaxi	Radio Galaxi	3:14
Total length:					19:25

== Charts ==
=== Album charts ===
Chart	Sales
South Korea (Gaon)	2,030

=== Single charts ===
Speed Circus

- 놀리러 간다 (Don't Tease Me!)

Chart (2013)	Peak position
Gaon Singles chart	95
Gaon Streaming Singles chart	145
Gaon Download Singles chart	94

== Release history ==
Region	Format	Date	Label	Edition
Worldwide	Digital download	February 18, 2014	Core Contents Media; KT Music	Regular Edition
South Korea	CD, digital download	February 18, 2014	Core Contents Media; KT Music	Regular Edition
Worldwide	Digital download	April 3, 2014	Core Contents Media; KT Music	Repackage Edition
South Korea	CD, digital download	April 3, 2014	Core Contents Media; KT Music	Repackage Edition
