= Unicorn (South Korean group) =

South Korean girl group

- Origin: Seoul, South Korea
- Genres: K-pop
- Years active: 2015–2017
- Labels: Show Brothers Entertainment (2015) Cartoon Blue Company (2016–2017)
- Past members: Yujin; Rumi; Gayoung; Sally; Winnie

Unicorn (Korean: 유니콘) was a four-member K-pop girl group produced by veteran R&B singer Kim Jo-han under Show Brothers Entertainment. According to Kim, “the name refers to the group's goal to heal people with music, just like a unicorn's horn is said to have the power of therapy.” The band debuted on September 3, 2015.

== History ==
=== Pre-debut ===
In 2013, Rumi debuted as a member of the girl group Purplay under the name Seolha.

=== 2015: Debut with Once Upon a Time ===
Unicorn was first revealed to the public in August 2015 through Naver TV Cast's web miniseries I Am a Girl Group, a five-episode sitcom that “revolves around various topics concerning K-pop idols, such as dating and dieting.” On September 3, the group released their debut EP titled Unicorn 'Once Upon a Time'. A music video for the album's title track, "Huk", was released on the same day.

=== 2016: Winnie's departure, new agency and 'Blink Blink' ===
Somewhere in 2016, Winnie left the group because of health issues. After Winnie's departure, Unicorn moved to another agency 'Cartoon Blue Company'.

On July 26, 2016, they released a teaser for their comeback single entitled "Blink Blink". A day later, they released its full music video and their second mini album, Unicorn Plus / The Brand New Label.

=== 2017: Disbandment ===
On September 5, 2017, Rumi posted on her Instagram that the group had disbanded, saying "I'm Rumi from UNICORN. On this day of September we stopped being UNICORN. I think [I] will disappoint fans who [have supported] us. We are very sorry but the love and support we received from you made us very happy & gave us great strength. Thank you very much. In the future the five of us will continue doing our best and working hard in our individual activities, so it would be great if you continue supporting us. It hurts to give this information but it doesn't mean the end! We believe that there will be a day when we will meet again. WE LOVE YOU ALL!"

== Former members ==
- Yujin (유진)
- Rumi (루미)
- Gayoung (가영)
- Sally (샐리)
- Winnie (위니)

== Discography ==
=== Extended plays ===
Title	Album details	Peak chart positions	Sales
Title	Album details	KOR	Sales
Once Upon a Time	Released: 1 September 2015; Label: Show Brothers Entertainment, FunFactory7, LOEN Entertainment; Format: CD, digital download; Track list: 1. "Intro"; 2. "Huk (헉)"; 3. "I Can't Take It (못참겠어)"; 4. "Step by Step"	21	KOR: 736+
Unicorn Plus_ The Brand New Label	Released: 28 July 2016; Label: Cartoon Blue Company, Krazy Tribe, LOEN Entertainment; Format: CD, digital download; Track list: 1. "Unicorn Intro"; 2. "Blink Blink"; 3. "Sun Shower"; 4. "I Need You Tonight"; 5. "Blink Blink (Inst.)"	45	KOR: 355+

=== Singles ===
Title	Year	Peak chart positions	Sales	Album
Title	Year	KOR	Sales	Album
"Huk" (헉)	2015	—	KOR: 3,456+	Once Upon a Time
"Blink Blink"	2016	—	KOR:	UNICORN PLUS / THE BRAND NEW LABEL

== Filmography ==
=== Television ===
Year	Title	TV Network	Member(s)	Note
2014	I Am a Girl Group	NaverTV	All	Sitcom miniseries

== Videography ==
Year	Title	Notes
2015	HUK (헉)	Music Video
2015	HUK (헉)	Dance Ver.
2016	Blink Blink	Music Video
2016	Blink Blink	Dance Ver.
