= MAP6 (band) =

2015–2019 South Korean boy band

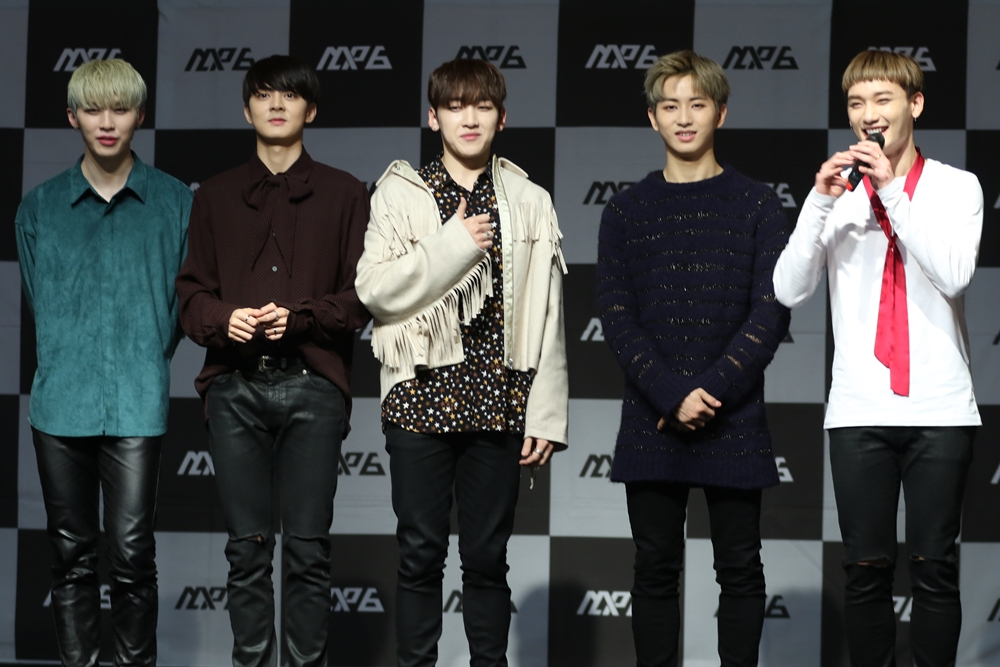
- MAP6 in 2017

Background information
- Origin: Seoul, South Korea
- Genres: K-pop
- Years active: 2015–2019
- Labels: All-S Entertainment
- Members: Minhyuk; J.Jun; Sign; Sun; J.Vin

MAP6 (Korean: 맵식스) is a South Korean boy band formed in 2015, which consists of five members: Minhyuk, J.Jun, Sign, Sun and J.Vin. They debuted on November 10, 2015, with the single "Storm".

On December 10, 2019, MAP6 went on hiatus as a result of four of the five members' impending enlistment to mandatory military service the following year.

== Members ==
- Minhyuk (민혁)
- J.Jun (제이준)
- Sign (싸인)
- Sun (썬)
- J.Vin (제이빈)

== Discography ==
=== Albums ===
Title	Album details	Peak chart positions	Sales
Title	Album details	JPN	Sales
MAP6 the first	Released: February 13, 2019; Label: Tokuma Japan Communications; Formats: CD, digital download; Track listing: 1. あいしてるよ; 2. Magic; 3. Make my Day; 4. Assassin; 5. NEGAI～光～; 6. RED; 7. SUPERSENSE; 8. Magnetic; 9. Like The Moonlight; 10. Vroom Vroom; 11. I'm ready ～JP.ver～	118	

=== Single albums ===
Title	Album details	Peak chart positions	Sales
Title	Album details	KOR	Sales
Momentum	Released: May 23, 2017; Label: Dream T Entertainment, LOEN Entertainment; Formats: CD, digital download; Track listing: 1. I'm Ready; 2. Closer; 3. Stand By Me (시간이 지나도)	30	KOR: 971+

=== Singles ===
Title	Year	Peak chart positions		Sales (DL)	Album
Title	Year	KOR	JPN	Sales (DL)	Album
Korean
"Storm"	2015	—	—	—	Non-album singles
"Swagger Time" (매력발산타임)	2016	—	—	—	Non-album singles
"I'm Ready"	2017	—	—	—	Momentum
"Love is Gone"	2017	—	—	—	Non-album single
"Follow Me"	2019	—	—	—	Non-album single
Japanese
"Miryoku hassan Time" (魅力発散TIME)	2016	—	11	JPN: 11,027	Non-album singles
"No Surrender"	2017	—	11	JPN: 6,306	Non-album singles
"Vroom Vroom"	2018	—	20	JPN: 4,381	MAP6 the first
"I'm Ready"	2018	—	25	JPN: 2,841	MAP6 the first
"I Like It"	2019	—	—		Non-album singles
"—" denotes releases that did not chart.
