= AlphaBat =

South Korean boy band

AlphaBAT
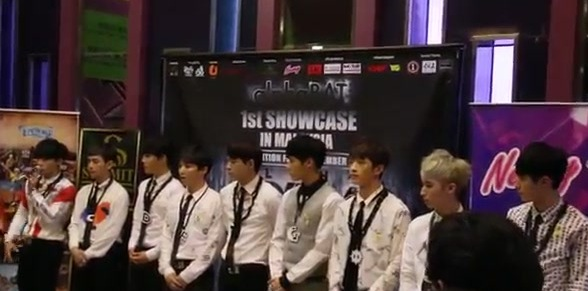
- AlphaBat's 1st Showcase In Malaysia PC April 24, 2014; Members from Left to Right: B:eta, C:ode, D:elta, E:psilon, F:ie, G:amma, H:eta, I:ota, J:eta

Background information
- Origin: Seoul, South Korea
- Genres: K-pop; hip hop; dance; electronic
- Years active: 2013–present
- Labels: Simtong Entertainment (South Korea); Jakol Corporation (Japan); W Entertainment (Korea); APB Entertainment (Korea)
- Members: B:eta; G:amma; L:ambda
- Past members: H:eta; Kyumin; C:ode; D:elta; F:ie; I:ota; J:eta; E:psilon; K:appa

AlphaBat (Korean: 알파벳; stylized as AlphaBAT) is a South Korean hiphop boy band formed by Simtong Entertainment in 2013. They are currently under APB Entertainment.

== History ==
=== Pre-debut ===
AlphaBAT originally debuted in 2012 as a duo (Kyumin & Selin) under the agency YUB Entertainment. After leaving the agency, Kyumin left the group. Selin, now going by the stage name "I:ota", continued as a member of AlphaBAT, which grew from a duo to a nine-member group under the company Simtong Entertainment.

=== 2013-2014: Debut with AB City, Ttanttara, Answer ===
Although their first performance for AB City was on November 12, 2013, when they recorded the music program Arirang: Simply Kpop, Simtong Entertainment's preferred official debut date for AlphaBAT was on November 14, 2013, the day AlphaBAT took their performance in M! Countdown. AlphaBAT's debut music video and song AB CITY was revealed on March 15.

Later, the boys released a second Christmas-themed digital single Surprise Party, revealing the official name of AlphaBAT's fandom: "Alpha".

Although their first performance was November 12, 2013, it was revealed that AlphaBAT would soon make their return in late February 2014 with their first mini album: Attention. Days before, they had released a single under the name of Always as a gift to their fans for supporting them. They finally revealed the full MV on the 25th, titled Ttanttara (딴따라).

They returned on August 22, 2014 with their second mini album Answer.

=== 2016 ===
As announced on November 1, 2016 via AlphaBAT Japan's official Twitter, AlphaBAT has appeared to have switched companies from Korean label Simtong Entertainment to Japanese label Jakol Corporation, along with the (unofficial) departure of members C:ode, D:elta, F:ie, I:ota, and youngest member J:eta who enlisted on November 9. They will be promoting as five members which includes the addition of new member K:appa who was revealed on AlphaBAT Japan's official Twitter on November 3. A Japanese comeback special was held on December 2. Activities included B:eta, E:psilon, G:amma, H:eta, and new member K:appa. Promotions will be without B:eta due to his enlistment.

=== 2017 ===
May 23, 2017 AlphaBAT opened a new official Instagram account, indicating they would soon be restarting activities as a group. On June 8, 2017, AlphaBAT appeared for the first time on Naver's Vapp channel Idol x Idol.

July 25, 2017, member H:eta announced his enlistment via his personal Instagram account. As a result, AlphaBAT was left with only four members. July 28, 2017, AlphaBAT released their EP, Get Your Luv, which they had a small showcase for.

On August 7, 2017 AlphaBAT released their music video for their title track, also called "Get Your Luv". They also released the dance practice for their title track on the same day.

On November 3, 2017, AlphaBAT performed "Get Your Luv" on Music Bank, their first time performing the song on a music show.

=== 2018 ===
In September 2018, the newest member, L:ambda was introduced. On October 8, 2018, AlphaBAT released a music video for their title track "New World". The single album also includes another track called "Blockbuster".

== Members ==
=== Current members ===
- B:eta (베타)
- G:amma (감마)
- L:ambda (람다)

=== Past members ===
- C:ode (코드)
- D:elta (델타)
- F:i.e
- H:eta
- I:ota
- J:eta
- Kyumin (규민)
- E:psilon (엡실론)
- K:appa (카파)

== Discography ==
=== Extended plays ===
Title	Album details	Peak chart positions	Sales
Title	Album details	KOR	Sales
Attention	Released: February 25, 2014; Label: Simtong Entertainment; Format: CD, digital download	20	KOR: 3,730
Answer	Released: August 22, 2014; Label: Simtong Entertainment; Format: CD, digital download	23	KOR: 2,328

=== Singles ===
Title	Year	Peak chart positions	Sales
Title	Year	KOR	Sales
"Hello" (안녕하세요)	2012	—	Non-album single
"AB City"	2013	—	Attention
"Surprise Party" (깜짝파티)	2013	—	Attention
"Always"	2014	—	Attention
"Tantara" (딴따라)	2014	—	Attention
"Oh My Gosh!" (답정너)	2014	—	Answer
"Get Your Luv" (원해)	2017	—	Non-album singles
"New Way" (신세계)	2018	—	Non-album singles
"Fly"	2019	—	Non-album singles
"Again" (불러본다)	2020	—	Non-album singles

== Reality show ==
- AlphaBat TV (web show) (03.07.2014 to the TBA)

== Awards and nominations ==
Year	Award	Category	Recipient	Result
2014	22nd KCEA Awards	Rookie of the year	AlphaBat	Won
2014	9th Korea Social Contribution Awards	Ambassador Award	AlphaBat	Won
