= Badkiz =

South Korean girl group

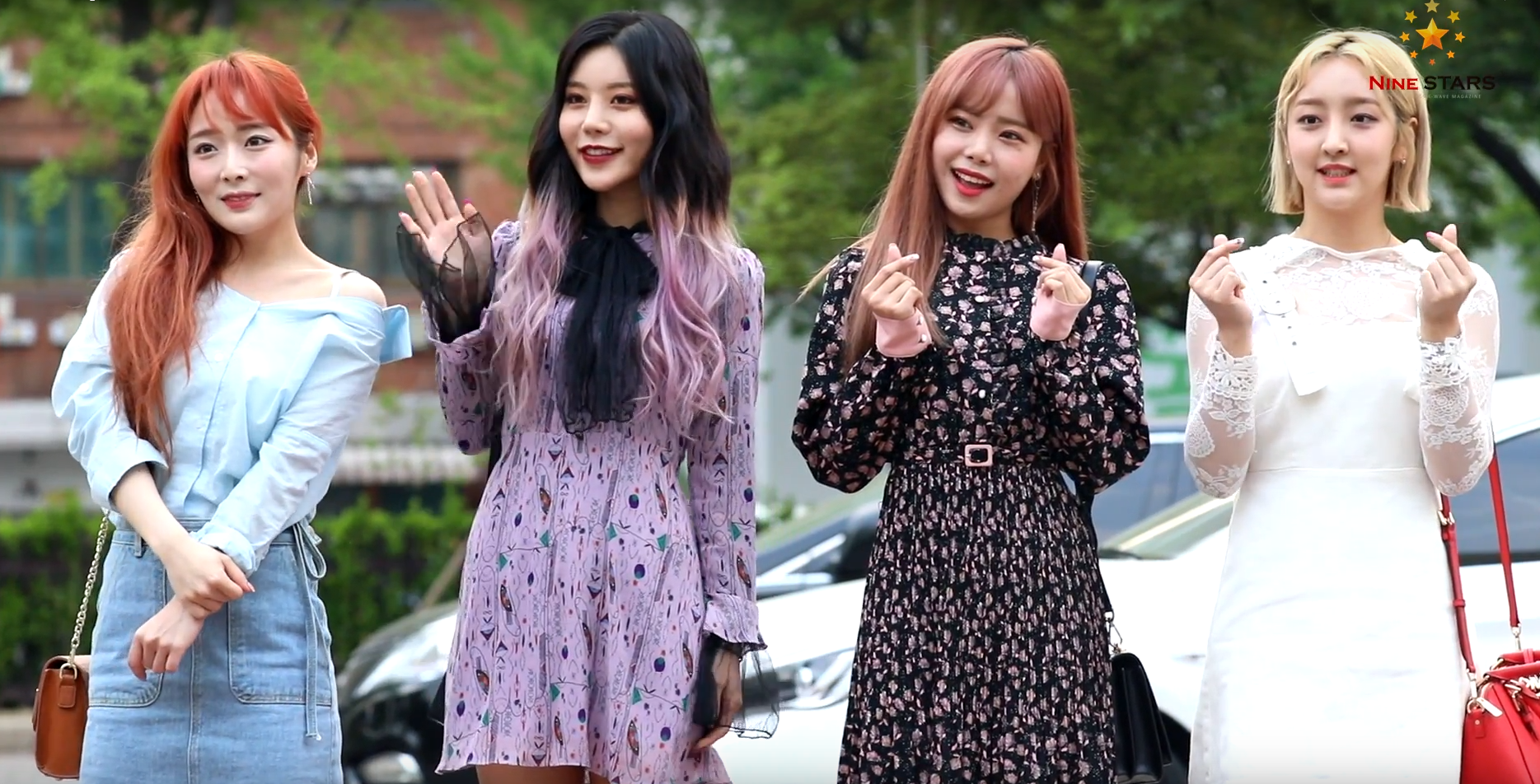
- Badkiz in 2018

Background information
- Also known as: Hot Place (2019–2020)
- Origin: South Korea
- Genre: K-pop
- Years active: 2014–2020; 2022–2024
- Label: US Entertainment
- Past members: see Members

Badkiz (Korean: 배드키즈; RR: Baedeukijeu), also known as Hot Place (Korean: 핫플레이스), is a South Korean girl group that debuted in 2014 with the song, "Ear Attack". The group's latest line-up consisted of Somin, Seoeun, Rosy and Yousi.

On February 15, 2019, after the departure of fifteen members, Badkiz changed their name to Hot Place. A year later after the departure of members Sihyeon and Taeri they returned to their name of Badkiz.

On October 14, 2020, Rozi confirmed Badkiz disbanded after all members wrote farewell letters to the fans.

On September 14, 2022, the group announced on their Instagram that they are planning to be active again. The line-up consisted of Somin (formerly Eunyu), Seoeun, Rosy (formerly Rozi) and Yousi (formerly U-Si).

In August 2024, member Yousi left. On November 3, member Rozi left and on December 16, member Somin (Eunyu) left, while Soeun updated her Instagram bio, confirming once that the group had disbanded again.

== History ==
=== Pre-debut ===
Before K.Me and Duna joined Badkiz, they were members of the group ZZBEst under Faith Entertainment, using their former stage names Miri and DanA respectively. The group disbanded before they could debut in 2015. After Duna left ZZBEst, she joined the group HOTTIES using the stage name "Hyena". HOTTIES preseumely disbanded in 2017.

=== 2014: Debut and viral success ===
Badkiz originally debuted on March 24, 2014, as a 5-member group consisting of the members Monika, BomBom, Yeunji, EunJoo and Jina with the digital single, "Ear Attack", two versions of the music video, and many appearances on music shows. Following the release of the debut single, Monika and Jina released a digital single, "Father", on March 30. Sometime after the debut single, EunJoo and Yeunji left Badkiz and were replaced by Yoomin and Hana. EunJoo debuted with Luluz in late 2014 under the stage name Eunsom. Luluz ultimately disbanded in 2015. Eunsom then become a member of Wanna.B under the same agency in 2015.

On November 13, 2014, Badkiz released their second single, "Babomba", which garnered over one million views. The video is known for including a lot of popular Korean comedians.

=== 2015: Line-up changes ===
In March 2015, Yoomin announced that she had left Badkiz, and for a brief period of time Badkiz continued as a four-member group. In April, following an appearance on Dream Team, Jina, BomBom and Hana also departed the group. While it is unknown why BomBom and Hana left Badkiz, Jina left to become a soloist and re-debuted on June 26, 2015, under the stage name Jina-U with her debut single, "Oppanyong". BomBom announced that she will be a member of a newly debuted group, Pit-A-Pat, under Pitapat Entertainment under the stage name "Jain".

After the departure of the four members, Zoo Entertainment announced the new members of Badkiz consisting of LuA, Haneul and K.Me. On August 7, 2015, Badkiz released their third digital single, "Come Closer".

=== 2016: Line-up changes ===
Member Haneul left the group shortly after the release of "Come Closer", and was replaced by two new members: Somin and U-Si. The new additions brought the group back up to its original count of a five-member line-up.

Badkiz released their fourth single, "Hothae", on August 15, 2016, the single failed to chart. On November 21, 2016, Badkiz released their fifth single, a remake of their debut single, "Ear Attack", called "Ear Attack 2". It was later revealed that member LuA had left the group, and she would be replaced by a new member: Duna.

=== 2017: "Give It to Me" and line-up changes ===
On July 3, 2017, Badkiz released their sixth single, "Give It to Me" and regularly performed on music shows, On Cafe Daum it was confirmed that U-Si and Duna left the group due to health and personal problems.

Near the end of 2017, Lohee was announced as a new member.

=== 2018: "Just One Day" and line-up changes ===
At the start of 2018, Sol.B began performing with Badkiz. In early 2018, Monika, the last original member of the group, announced her departure to focus on her solo career.

On April 6, 2018, Badkiz released their seventh single, "Just One Day", the single failed to chart and failed to win the show trophies, A few months after promotions, Sol.B left the group and a new member, Hanbit, was added. Soon after, K.Me later announced her departure due to her contract expiring with a new member, Hayoung, joining a few days later. Lohee announced her departure in a letter to the fans and another new member, Sihyeon, was added to the group. In an effort to start over fresh, old Badkiz content was deleted from social media accounts and Somin announced her stage name would change to Kira.

=== 2019: Hayoung's departure and reformation as Hot Place ===
In 2019, the band had their name changed to Hot Place. A new member, Taeri, was announced and Hayoung's departure silently confirmed They released their debut single album Hot Place in March 2019, with their title track "TMI"

=== 2020–2024: Line-up changes, Makestar failure, first disbandment, reunion and second disbandment ===
In 2020, following Taeri and Sihyun's departures, the band changed their name back to Badkiz.

In April 2020, three new members were announced for a comeback: Rawhi, Rozi and Semi. Later, it was reported that Rahwi will not join the Badkiz line up because of her health. Jeje once again changed her stage name to Eunyu, as well her legal name. Hanbit also changed her stage name to Seoeun. Badkiz began posting cover dance videos and opened a Makestar to help raise funds for their comeback.

Following Yousi's departure and the failure of their Makestar campaign in August, Badkiz went abruptly silent on social media. On October 14, Semi, Eunyu and Seoeun wrote farewell letters to the fans. Rozi wrote a letter later that day confirming that Badkiz had disbanded, as they wanted to do other activities.

On September 14, 2022, the group announced on their Instagram that they are planning to be active again. The line-up currently consists of Somin (formerly Eunyu), Seoeun, Rosy (formerly Rozi) and Yousi (formerly U-Si). On February 14, 2024, Seoueun announced her departure from the group.

In August 2024, member Yousi left. On November 3, member Rozi left and on December 16, member Somin (Eunyu) left, while Soeun updated her Instagram bio, confirming once that the group had disbanded again.

== Members ==
=== Former ===
==== First known line-up ====
- EunJoo (은주) (2014)
- Yeunji (연지) (2014)
- BomBom (봄봄) (2014–2015)
- Jina (지나) (2014–2015)
- Yoomin (유민) (2014–2015)
- Hana (하나) (2014–2015)

==== Second known line-up ====
- Haneul (하늘) (2015–2016)
- LuA (루아) (2015–2016)
- Duna (두나) (2016–2017)
- U-Si (유시) (2016–2017)

==== Third known line-up ====
- Monika (모니카) (2014–2018)
- Sol.B (솔비) (2018)
- K.Me (케이미) (2015–2018)
- Lohee (로희) (2017–2018)
- Hayoung (하영) (2018–2019)
- Sihyeon (시현) (2018–2020)
- Taeri (태리) (2019–2020)

==== Fourth known line-up until disbandment ====
- Rawhi (라휘) (2020)
- Eunyu (formerly Somin/Kira/Jeje) (은유) (2016–2020)
- Seoeun (formerly Hanbit) (서은) (2018–2020)
- Rozi (로지) (2020)
- Semi (세미) (2020)

==== Last known line-up until disbandment (2022–2024) ====
- Somin (은유) (2022–2024)
- Seoeun (formerly Hanbit) (서은) (2022–2024)
- Rozi (로지) (2022–2024)
- Semi (세미) (2022–2024)

=== Timeline ===
Black (vertical) = single release

== Discography ==
=== Single albums ===
Title	Album details
Hot Place	Released: March 29, 2019; Label: Zoo Entertainment, Interpark Music; Formats: Digital download; Track listing: 1. TMI; 2. TMI (Ruff Icy & MAKA Remix); 3. BAD BOX; 4. Kill you
"—" denotes a recording that did not chart or was not released in that territory.

=== Singles ===
Title	Year	Peak chart positions	Sales (DL)	Album
Title	Year	KOR	Sales (DL)	Album
BADKIZ
"Ear Attack" (귓방망이)	2014	59	KOR: 41,885+	Non-album singles
"Babomba" (바밤바)	2014	—	—N/a	Non-album singles
"Come Closer" (이리로)	2015	—	—N/a	Non-album singles
"Hothae" (핫해)	2016	—	—N/a	Non-album singles
"Ear Attack 2" (귓방망이2)	2016	—	—N/a	Non-album singles
"Give It To Me"	2017	—	—N/a	Non-album singles
"Just One Day" (딱 하루)	2018	—	—N/a	Non-album singles
Hot Place
"TMI"	2019	—	—N/a	Hot Place
"—" denotes release did not chart.
