= 9Muses S/S Edition =

- From left to right: Sojin, Keumjo, Seungha, Kyungri, Hyuna, Hyemi, Keumjo and Euaerin.

EP by Nine Muses
- Released: July 2, 2015
- Recorded: 2015
- Studios: Star Empire (Seoul, S. Korea)
- Genres: K-pop; dance-pop
- Length: 17:37
- Labels: Star Empire; KT Music

Nine Muses chronology
Drama (2015)	9Muses S/S Edition (2015)	Lost (2015)

Singles from 9Muses S/S Edition
- 1. "Hurt Locker" Released: July 2, 2015

Music video
- "Hurt Locker" on YouTube

9Muses S/S Edition (stylized in all caps) is the fourth extended play by South Korean girl group Nine Muses. It was released on July 2, 2015, by Star Empire Entertainment, and distributed by KT Music. The EP consists of six songs. Its title track is "Hurt Locker," which was widely promoted on Korean music shows and also had a music video released on July 2.

== Background ==
After wrapping up the promotions for their EP Drama in March 2015, Nine Muses continuing promotions elsewhere, but soon began working on a new album; their company Star Empire Entertainment stated on May 24 that a comeback from the girls was expected to happen during either June or July without any line-up changes, as on their previous album.

== Release ==
On June 3, their comeback was confirmed to happen on early July with a special summer album. The teaser pictures started being unveiled on June 16, also confirming the mini album to be released on July 2. The tracklist was revealed on June 25 through a video containing small previews of all the songs from the album.

The album was finally released on July 2, on both digital and physical formats. Digitally, the album was made available through many online music services, including Melon in South Korea, and iTunes worldwidely.

== Music videos ==
On June 23, the first teaser for the music video of the title track "Hurt Locker" was released on Nine Muses' official YouTube channel. A second teaser came out the day after, on June 24. The third and last teaser, which was mainly focused on member Hyemi, was released on June 29. The full music video was released on July 2 and it features the girls dancing around and on top of huge colored containers. A dance practice video came out on July 5 showing the full choreography for the song.

On August 13, Nine Muses released a promotional music video for the song "Yes or No", which was directed by the group itself. The video shows the girls singing through their Instagram accounts.

== Promotion ==
In order to promote the album, Nine Muses performed the title track "Hurt Locker" on many Korean music shows. The first comeback stage was held on KBS's Music Bank on July 3. They also performed on MBC's Show! Music Core, SBS MTV's The Show, and Mnet's M Countdown. A showcase was also held by Genie Music, where the girls performed new songs from the album, along with some of their previous singles, such as "News", "Dolls", "Wild" and "Drama". The promotions for the album concluded on August 18.

== Commercial performance ==
9Muses S/S Edition managed to debut at number 5 on the Gaon Album Chart with only 2 days of sales, since the chart was issued between June 28 and July 4, 2015. On the monthly edition of the same chart, the album appeared at number 15 with 7,054 physical copies sold for the month of July. It also entered the Billboard's World Albums Chart at number 8 during the week of July 18, 2015. The album had sold 7,372 copies as of 2015, appearing at number 150 on the Gaon Year-End Chart.

The title track "Hurt Locker" debuted at number 32 on the Gaon Digital Chart on the issue between June 28 and July 4, 2015, with 50,745 downloads sold, and 747,074 streams. By the end of July, the single had sold around 153,403 digital copies, and garnered 946,739 streams. For the week of July 18, 2015, the song entered the Billboard's World Digital Songs at number 20.

== Track listing ==
Credits adapted from Naver.

No.	Title	Lyrics	Music	Arrangement	Length
1.	"Muse"		e.one	e.one	1:01
2.	"Hurt Locker" (다쳐; Dachyeo)	e.one; Urban Cllasik	Erik Lidbom; Anne Judith Wik; Herbie Crichlow	e.one	3:26
3.	"A" (너란애; Neolan-ae)	e.one; Euaerin	e.one	e.one	3:08
4.	"Fancy" (팬시)	Jung Changwook	Changwook	Changwook	3:06
5.	"Yes or No"	Boytoy; Lel; Euaerin	Boytoy; Lel	Boytoy; Lel	3:30
6.	"Hurt Locker" (instrumental)		Lidbom; Wik; Crichlow	e.one	3:26
Total length:					17:37

== Charts ==
=== Weekly charts ===
Chart (2015)	Peak position	Ref.
South Korean Albums (Gaon)	5	
US World Albums (Billboard)	8	

=== Monthly charts ===
Chart (2015)	Peak position	Ref.
South Korean Albums (Gaon)	15	

=== Year-end charts ===
Chart (2015)	Peak position	Ref.
South Korean Albums (Gaon)	150	

== Release history ==
Region	Date	Format	Label	Ref.
South Korea	July 2, 2015	CD, Digital download	Star Empire Entertainment, KT Music	
Various	July 2, 2015	Digital download	Star Empire Entertainment, KT Music	
