= Drama (Nine Muses EP) =

- Digital cover

EP by Nine Muses
- Released: January 23, 2015
- Recorded: 2014–2015
- Genres: K-pop; Dance-pop
- Length: 18:27
- Labels: Star Empire; KT Music

Nine Muses chronology
Prima Donna (2013)	Drama (2015)	9Muses S/S Edition (2015)

Singles from Drama
- 1. "Drama" Released: January 23, 2015

Music video
- "Drama" on YouTube

Drama (stylized as DRAMA) is the third extended play by the South Korean girl group Nine Muses. It was released on January 23, 2015, by Star Empire Entertainment, and distributed by KT Music. The title track "Drama" was also released on the same day as its only single. The album marks the first to include members Keumjo and Sojin, who joined the group after Lee Sem, Eunji and Sera's departure. In order to promote the album, the group performed on various Korean music shows.

== Background ==
On January 29, 2014, it was announced by Star Empire Entertainment that members Lee Sem and Eunji had left the group. A few months later, on June 23, it was also revealed that member Sera's contract expired and she decided to no longer be a part of the company, also leaving the group. However, Star Empire confirm that a comeback from the remaining girls was expected to happen on August, including a new member, yet to be revealed.

The anticipated comeback didn't happen. Instead, on August, a new project from the company was announced, including Nine Muses' Kyungri, ZE:A's Kevin, and the trainee Sojin. They debuted as the trio Nasty Nasty on September 3.

== Release ==
After the promotions for the trio ended, a teaser image for a Nine Muses comeback came out on January 8, 2015, also announcing the album to be released on January 23. On January 11, another teaser was unveiled, confirming another line-up change to the group, as two new members appeared along the other girls showing only their backs. The day after, on January 12, the new members were revealed to be Keumjo, and Sojin, who debuted alongside Kyungri and labelmate Kevin as Nasty Nasty on the previous year. In order to introduce the new members, two teasers were released, one for Sojin dancing to Beyoncé's "Ego", and the other for Keumjo singing a short a capella cover of "Killing Me Softly with His Song".

The mini album was officially released on January 23 on most South Korean digital retailers, including Melon. It was made available worldwidely through iTunes. A physical version of the album was also released on January 28.

== Music video ==
The title track "Drama" had the first teaser for its music video released on January 17. A second teaser came out two days later, on January 19. The full music video was released on January 23, filled with references to Hollywood's golden age, including Marilyn Monroe's iconic subway dress scene from the 1995 film The Seven Year Itch. On January 24, a dance practice video was also released, featuring the girls dancing to the full choreography of the song in casual clothes.

== Promotion ==
Before the release of the album, a showcase was held on January 21, where the group interacted with fans and also performed new songs from the album as well as two of their previous singles, "Glue" and "Wild". It was broadcast live through Genie Music's official YouTube channel. The first comeback stage was held with the single "Drama" on Mnet's M Countdown on August 22, where the members Sojin, Kyungri, Sungah and Minha also performed a dance intro to Beyoncé's Yoncé. Other Korean music shows were used as the stage for the promotions of the album, including KBS's Music Bank, MBC's Show! Music Core, SBS's Inkigayo, and SBS M's The Show. The promotions went on until March 15.

== Commercial performance ==
Drama debuted on the Gaon Album Chart at number 4 on the issue between January 25 and January 31, 2015. For the same month, the album appeared at number 10 on the monthly edition of the Gaon Album Chart with 4,661 physical copies sold. It stayed on the chart for the months of February and March, selling 1,785 and 1,521 copies respectively. The album had sold 7,978 copies as of 2015, appearing at number 140 on the Gaon Year-End Chart.

The single "Drama" debuted at number 41 on the Gaon Digital Chart on the issue between January 18 and January 24, 2015, having sold 32,102 digital copies. On the following week, the song climbed 28 positions, peaking at number 13 and becoming Nine Muses' highest peak on the chart to date. By the end of 2015, "Drama" had sold over 301,993 downloads, and garnered 1,675,033 streams.

== Controversy ==
Some of the teaser pictures used to announce the album were accused of plagiarism, due to the similarity with W Magazine Korea's pastel doll concept. To clear up the controversy, Star Empire said the pictures were a homage to the magazine's pictorial and that they made sure there were no copyright issues before the release. However, on January 15, W Korea released a statement revealing the agency never contacted them, or the editorial's photographer Hong Janghyun, and no agreement was ever made. That led to Star Empire formally apologizing for the confusion and stating that, although the copyright issues were never discussed between both parties, they did refer to the magazine's work during the production of the album's jacket photoshoot.

== Track listing ==
Credits adapted from Naver.

No.	Title	Lyrics	Music	Arrangement	Length
1.	"Pilot Episode"	Jung Changwook	Changwook	Changwook	0:48
2.	"Drama" (드라마)	Changwook	Changwook	Changwook	3:00
3.	"Choice" (초이스)	Playing Child; Mafly; Sohyeon	Playing Child; Sim Manju	Playing Child; Manju	3:30
4.	"Trickle" (주르륵; Jururuk)	Boytoy; Yoon Taewoong; Joseong Kwang; Urban Cllasik	Boytoy; Taewoong; Kwang	Boytoy; Taewoong; Kwang	3:05
5.	"September 17th" (9월 17일; Guwol Sibchil)	e.one; Urban Cllasik	e.one	e.one	4:02
6.	"September 17th" (instrumental)		e.one	e.one	4:02
Total length:					18:27

== Charts ==
=== Weekly charts ===
Chart (2015)	Peak position	Ref.
South Korea (Gaon Album Chart)	4	

=== Monthly charts ===
Chart (2015)	Peak position	Ref.
South Korea (Gaon Album Chart)	10	

=== Year-end charts ===
Chart (2015)	Peak position	Ref.
South Korea (Gaon Album Chart)	140	

== Release history ==
Region	Date	Format	Label	Ref.
South Korea	January 23, 2015	Digital download	Star Empire Entertainment, KT Music	
Worldwide	January 23, 2015	Digital download	Star Empire Entertainment, KT Music	
South Korea	January 28, 2015	CD	Star Empire Entertainment, KT Music	
