= Lip Service (group) =

2014–2017 South Korean girl group

Lip Service 립서비스
- Origin: Seoul, South Korea
- Genres: K-pop; Dance-pop
- Years active: 2014–2017
- Labels: Chorok Entertainment; Luce Entertainment; CMG Chorok Stars; Now Entertainment
- Past members: BiPa; Anna; Cora; CinD

Lip Service (Korean: 립서비스), was a South Korean trio formed by Now Entertainment in Seoul, South Korea. They debuted on February 4, 2014, with the single "Yum Yum Yum".

On August 19, 2017, BiPa announced via her Instagram account that the group had "effectively disbanded", which was further confirmed by the group's official media going inactive roughly around the same time. Since the disbandment, Anna has joined the dance team "Aura" using her birth name Eunkyung, and performed as a backup dancer for Shinee's Taemin's performance of "Move" during the 2018 Dream Concert while BiPa has become a model and is working on her solo music career.

== Members ==
=== Former members ===
- BiPa (비파) (2014–2017)
- Anna (애나) (2014–2017)
- Cora (코라) (2014–2015)
- CinD (신디) (2016)

== Discography ==
=== Extended plays ===
| Title | Album details | Peak chart positions | Sales |
| Title | Album details | KOR | Sales |
|---|---|---|---|
| Hello | Released: March 18, 2016; Label: Chorok Entertainment, Sony Music Korea; Formats: CD, digital download; Track listing: 1. Okey Dokey (오키도키); 2. Hello (이슬만 먹고) | 46 | — |

=== Singles ===
| Title | Year | Peak chart positions | Sales | Album |
| Title | Year | KOR | Sales | Album |
|---|---|---|---|---|
| "Yum Yum Yum" (냠냠냠) | 2014 | — | — | Non-album singles |
| "Too Fancy" (돈비싸) | 2014 | — | — | Non-album singles |
| "Relax" (유치뽕) | 2014 | — | — | Non-album singles |
| "In The Spring" (봄 되면 어쩌나) feat. J-Lin | 2015 | — | — | Non-album singles |
| "Hello" (이슬만 먹고) | 2016 | — | — | Hello |
"—" denotes releases that did not chart.

=== Soundtrack appearances ===
| Year | Title | Drama |
|---|---|---|
| 2015 | "Love on a Rooftop" (오늘부터 사랑해) feat. J-Lin | Love on a Rooftop OST |
