= Nine Muses (group) =

South Korean girl group

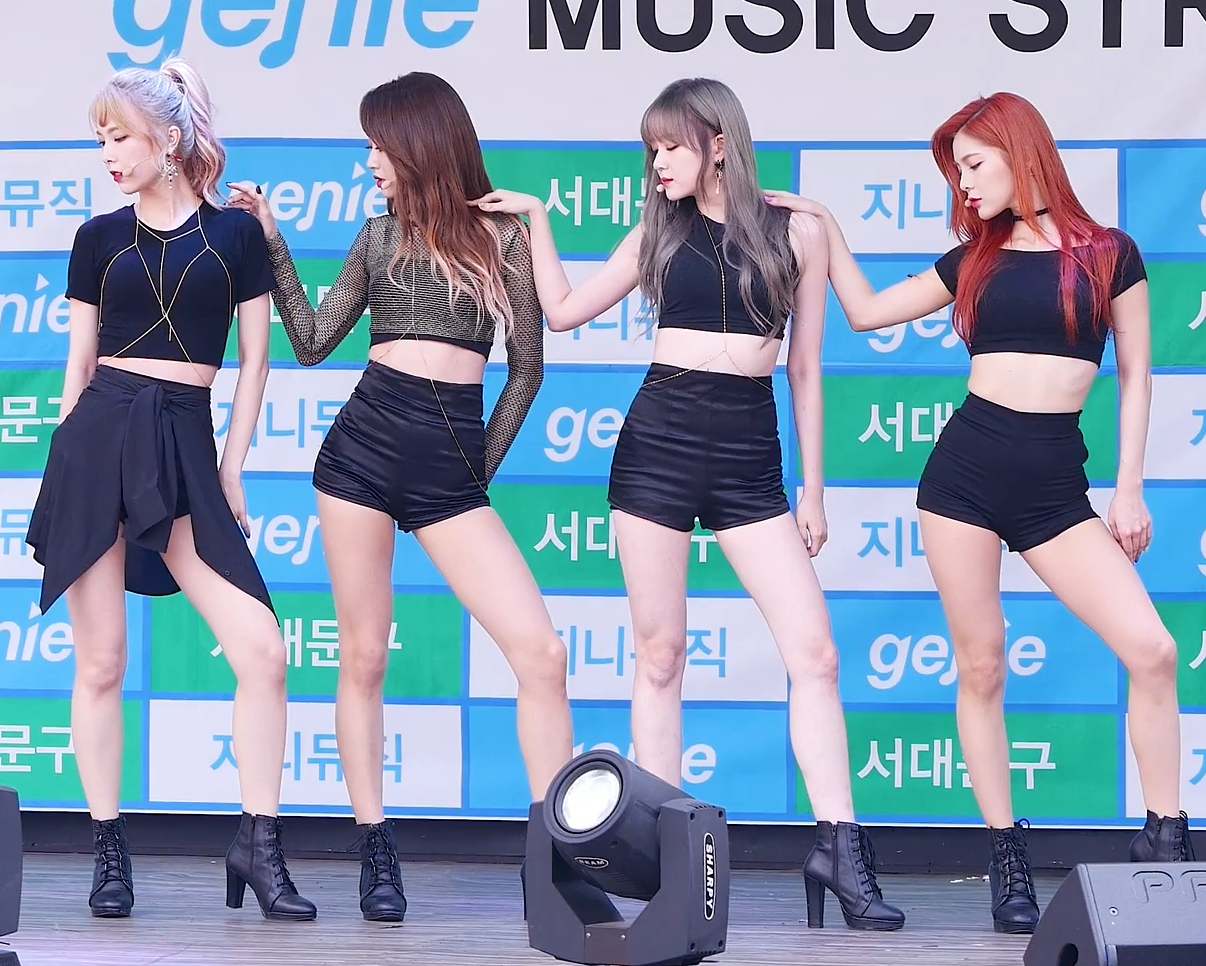
- Nine Muses performing Love City in 2017; From left to right: Hyemi, Gyeongree, Keumjo, and Sojin.

Background information
- Also known as: 9Muses; Namyu
- Origin: Seoul, South Korea
- Genres: K-pop; dance-pop; synthpop
- Years active: 2010–2019; 2021; 2025
- Label: Star Empire
- Spinoffs: Nine Muses A
- Members: Hyuna; Euaerin; Sungah; Gyeongree; Hyemi; Minha; Sojin; Keumjo
- Past members: Jaekyung; Rana; Bini; Lee Sem; Eunji; Sera
- Website: 9muses.co.kr

Nine Muses (Korean: 나인뮤지스, most commonly stylized as 9Muses) were a South Korean girl group formed by Star Empire Entertainment in 2010 with an admission and graduation concept. The group consists of total of fourteen former members: Jaekyung, Bini, Rana, Lee Sem, Sera, Eunji, Euaerin, Minha, Hyuna, Sungah, Gyeongree, Hyemi, Sojin, and Keumjo, with the latter four being part of the final Nine Muses lineup for their last two albums and final single, "Remember" (2019).

Following an unsuccessful debut with the single "No Playboy", the group's line-up changed with the release of the comeback single, "Figaro". The group's follow-up single "News" became their best-selling single, and its parent EP, Sweet Rendezvous, peaked at number six on the Gaon Album Chart. Following further lineup changes, the group came back in 2013 with single album Dolls, extended play Wild, and their first studio album Prima Donna, bookended by the digital single "Glue".

After a year-long hiatus in 2014, the group came back with a new line-up for their 2015 EP Drama in January. Its lead single of the same name became their highest-charting, peaking at number 13 on the Gaon Digital Chart. Other releases in 2015 included the EPs 9Muses S/S Edition and Lost. The group's first sub-unit, Nine Muses A, released the single album Muses Diary in 2016. The group retained their 2016 lineup for the next full-group release, the EP Muses Diary Pt. 2: Remember in June 2017. Nine Muses disbanded in February 2019 following the contract expirations of members Hyemi, Sojin, and Keumjo.

== History ==
=== 2009: Formation and "Give Me" ===
On April 8, 2009, Star Empire Entertainment announced its plan to create a girl group called Nine Muses on the Mnet reality show, "Children of the Empire". According to Star Empire CEO Shin Ju-hak, the group's line-up would rotate and its members would be active in fields including singing, acting and modeling. Through the show, Rana, Sera, Eunji, Lee Sem, Euarin, Jaekyung, Bini, Minha and Hyemi were chosen to be members of Nine Muses. They released their first song "Give Me," a duet with Seo In-young for the soundtrack to Prosecutor Princess, on April 7, 2010.

=== 2010–2011: Debut, Jaekyung's withdrawal, Hyuna's addition, members departure, Euaerin's return, further releases and commercial popularity ===
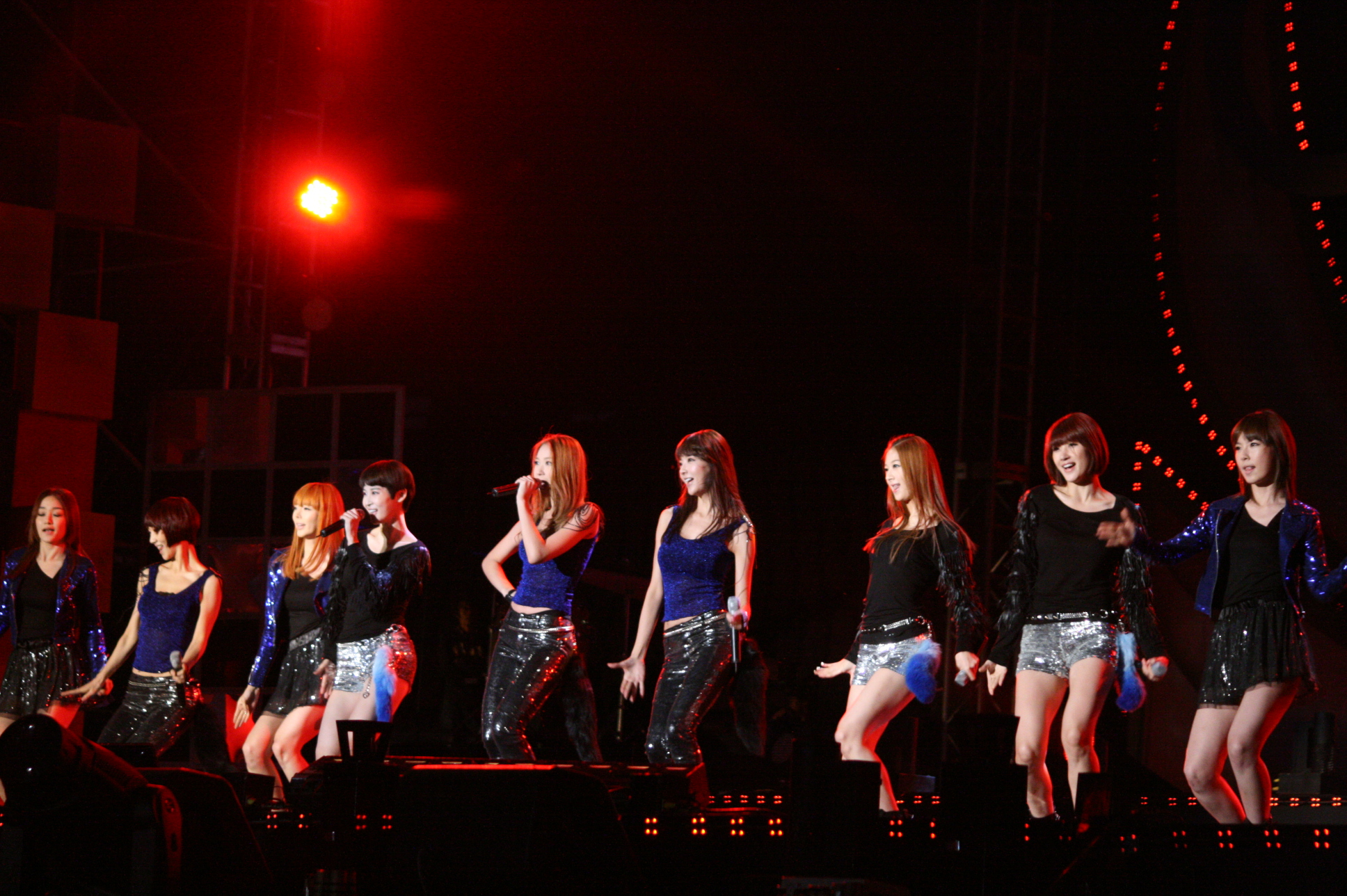
Nine Muses in 2010

Nine Muses officially debuted on August 12, 2010 with the single album Let's Have a Party. Its lead single, "No Playboy", was written and produced by Rainstone and Park Jin-young. The album debuted at number 18 on the Gaon Album Chart, while "No Playboy" peaked at number 56 on the Gaon Digital Chart.

In October, Jaekyung was expelled from the group because the CEO of the company believed that she lacked passion for music, she was replaced by Hyuna prior to promotions for the group's second single, "Ladies". In December, Nine Muses won a Top Ten Singers Award at the Korean Culture Entertainment Awards. Later that month, the group performed in Japan for the first time, alongside boyband ZE:A, at the Seoul Train: Nine Muses & Friends concert in Tokyo.

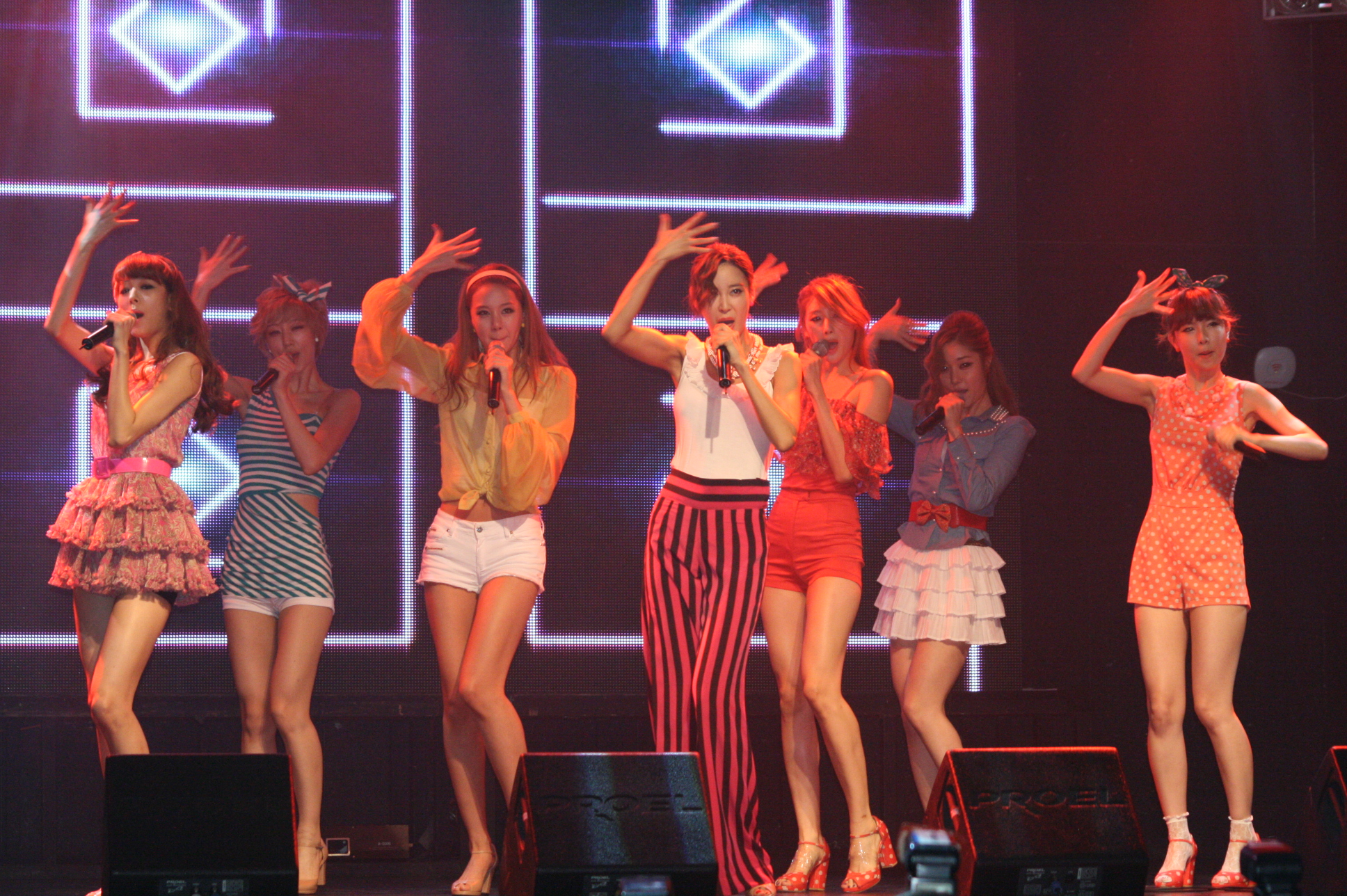
Nine Muses performing Figaro in M Countdown in 2011.

In February 2011, Star Empire announced the departure of members Bini, Rana and Euaerin. Bini was expelled from the group due to the same reason that led to Jaekyung's expulsion from the group. Rana said she couldn't handle the pressure of being the leader, so she decided to quit the group, although years later in an interview she revealed that one of the reasons why she left 9MUSES it was because she just couldn't sing. Euaerin decided to go to Japan, but rejoined the group in April of that same year because the plans had not gone as she wanted. They made their comeback with the digital single "Figaro" as a seven-piece group on August 18, 2011.

=== 2012–2013: Gyeongree and Sungah’s addition, Sweet Rendezvous, nine-member comeback, Wild, and Prima Donna ===
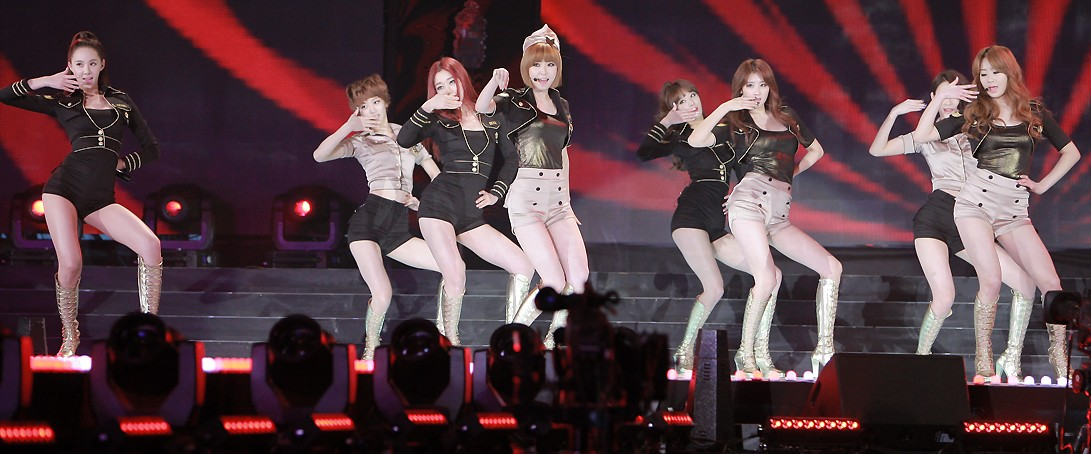
Nine Muses in 2012

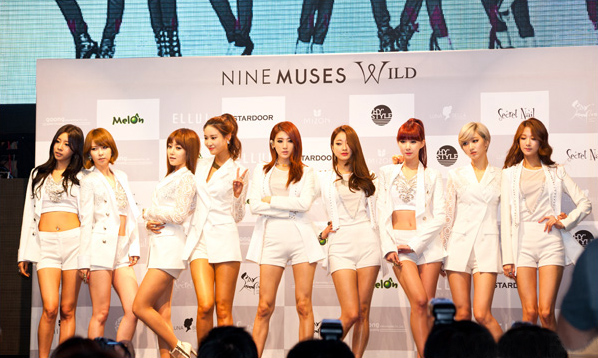
Nine Muses in 2013

Following the addition of new member Gyeongree, the group released the single, "News," on January 11, 2012. The song was produced by Sweetune, who was also behind their "Figaro" single. On March 8, 2012, Nine Muses released their first extended play, Sweet Rendezvous, with the lead single "Ticket". The extended play debuted at number 6 on the Gaon Album Chart. The group featured in a documentary called 9 Muses of Star Empire released in 2012 that chronicling their debut period.

In January 2013, Star Empire announced the addition of new member Sungah, reporting that the group would soon be making a comeback with nine members for the first time since 2010. Nine Muses released their second single album, Dolls, with a lead single of the same name, on January 24, 2013. The single, which marked the group's fourth collaboration with producer team Sweetune, was the group's highest charting single to date, peaking at number 17 on the Gaon Digital Chart. The group followed up on that success with the release of their second extended play, Wild, including a title track of the same name, on May 9, 2013. The extended play debuted at number 4 on the Gaon Album Chart, while the single peaked at number 22 on the Gaon Digital Chart.

On October 13, 2013, Nine Muses released their first studio album Prima Donna with lead single "Gun". The group released digital single "Glue" and its music video on December 4, 2013.

=== 2014–2015: Line-up changes, Gyeongree's debut in Nasty Nasty, Eight-member comeback, Drama, 9Muses S/S Edition and Lost ===
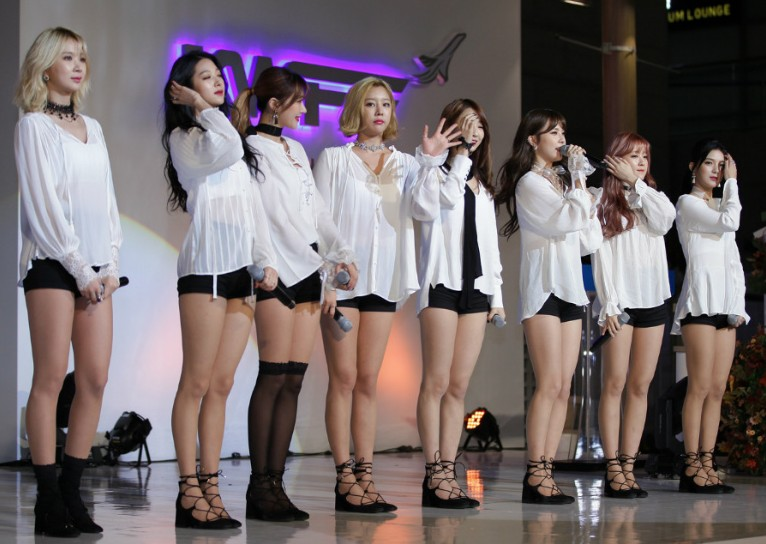
Nine Muses in 2015

In January 2014, it was announced that Lee Sem and Eunji had left the group following the expiration of their contracts. The agency released a statement saying that they would continue with the remaining seven members, with possible new members added. In June, it was revealed that Sera's contract was not renewed and she would be leaving the group to focus on solo activities and establish her own agency. While the company said the group would release new music in August after the addition of a new member, it instead debuted the project group Nasty Nasty on September 3. The group, which released the single "Knock," was composed of Gyeongree, ZE:A's Kevin and singer Sojin.

In January 2015, Star Empire announced the addition of Nasty Nasty member Sojin and new member Keumjo to Nine Muses. On January 23, 2015, the now-eight-member group released their third extended play Drama, including the lead single of the same name. The song peaked at number 13 on the Gaon Digital Chart.

In July 2015, the group released their fourth EP 9Muses S/S Edition with the title track "Hurt Locker". Nine Muses' fifth EP Lost was released on November 24, 2015.

=== 2016–2017: Minha, Euaerin and Hyuna's departure, Sungah's hiatus and Muses Diary series ===
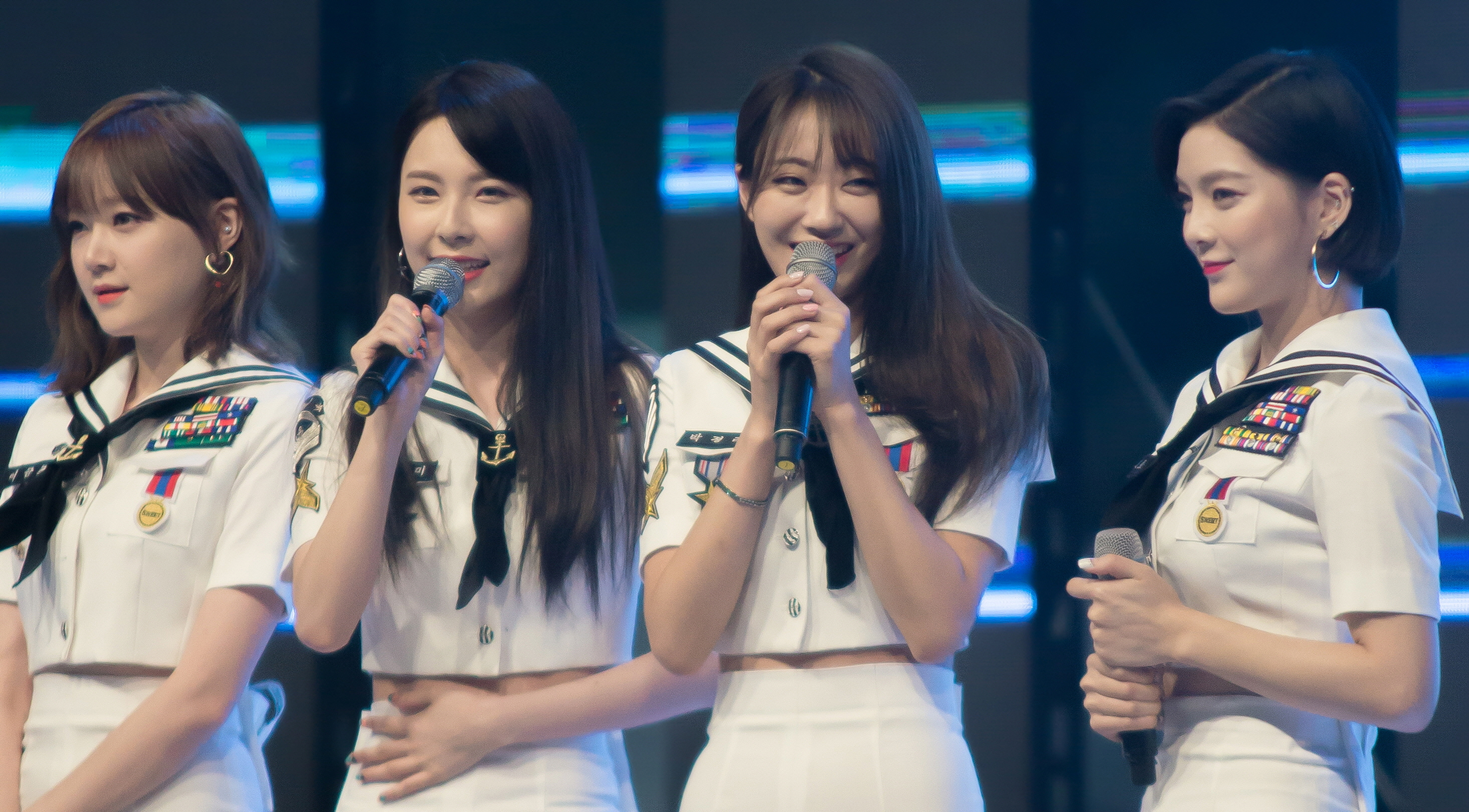
Nine Muses A

The group held their first concert Muse in the City on February 19, 2016 at Wapop Hall in Seoul Children's Grand Park and also held two fan meets in China. On June 7, 2016, it was confirmed that Minha and Euaerin would be leaving the group at the end of the first week in June after they both decided not to renew their contracts with the company; the agency later confirmed that those former members would continue on to do solo activities. Minha later became an actress and Euaerin went back to modeling and other projects. Nine Muses later formed a four-member subgroup, Nine Muses A (an abbreviation for Nine Muses Amuse), which was composed of Gyeongree, Hyemi, Sojin, and Keumjo for a summer comeback. On October 4, 2016, it was revealed that Hyuna wouldn't renew her contract at the end of month and she'd be withdrawing the group after six years. Nine Muses remained as a four-member group due to Sungah taking hiatus to pursue her work as a disk jockey.

The group released their sixth extended play Muses Diary Part. 2: Identity on June 19, 2017. It was the second release of the Muses Diary series from their debut album under Nine Muses A. It charted on Gaon Album Charts at number 5 and at number 15 on Billboard. The extended play contained six tracks, with the lead single being "Remember". Their comeback showcase was held at the YES24 Muv Hall on the same day as the album's release. Nine Muses held second concert Re:Mine on July 29, 2017 at the Bluesquare Samsung Card Hall located in Yongsan. On August 3, 2017, a repackaged version of Muses Diary Part. 2: Identity, titled Muses Diary Part. 3: Love City, was released. The reissue contained four tracks from Muses Diary Part. 2: Identity and two new songs including the title track "Love City".

=== 2018–2019: Sungah's departure, Disbandment and Remember ===
On January 2, 2019, Sungah stopped appearing in the "members" section of the 9muses website, so this automatically confirmed her departure from the group. On February 10, 2019, it was announced that the group had disbanded nine years after debuting due to the expiration of Sojin, Keumjo and Hyemi’s contracts and two of the members graduating. Prior to their disbandment, the group concluded activities with the release of their final digital single titled "Remember" on February 14 and held a fan meeting with the same title on February 24.

=== 2023–present: Possible reunion & 15th debut anniversary fan meeting ===
On March 21, 2023, it was announced that Nine Muses A would be releasing a song in May, followed by a full group comeback sometime in July or August, though the line-up for the full group comeback has yet to be confirmed. As of December 2023, however, nothing has been reported on their comeback.

On July 29, 2025, the group announced that they will hold a concert named 'MUSE : on' to celebrate their 15th debut anniversary with eight members at Seongam Art Hall on August 31.

== Public image and reception ==
Prior to their debut, Nine Muses were marketed as a group of "model dolls" in reference to the members' tall and slim physiques, and the fact that several members had previously worked as models. The label was used to describe the group throughout their career. Nine Muses was best known for their "sexy" image, and was especially popular among military servicemen in South Korea, earning the group the nickname "military president" (Korean: 군통령).

While the group experienced modest success, they failed to achieve top-tier popularity. South Korean media dubbed Nine Muses a "nadallen" (Korean: 나달렌) group, alongside peers Dal Shabet and Rainbow, for having "all of the conditions for success" but none of the luck of more popular groups.

== Members ==
=== Former members ===
- Jaekyung (재경) (August 2010 - October 2010)
- Bini (비니) (August 2010 – January 2011)
- Rana (라나) (August 2010 – January 2011)
- Eunji (은지) (August 2010 – January 2014)
- Lee Sem (이샘) (August 2010 – January 2014)
- Sera (세라) (August 2010 – June 2014)
- Euaerin (이유애린) (August 2010 – January 2011), (April 2011 - June 2016) (performance 2021, fanmeeting 2025)
- Minha (민아) (August 2010 – June 2016) (performance 2021, fanmeeting 2025)
- Hyemi (혜미) (August 2010 – February 2019) (performance 2021, fanmeeting 2025)
- Hyuna (현아) (October 2010 – October 2016) (performance 2021, fanmeeting 2025)
- Gyeongree (경리) (January 2012 – February 2019) (performance 2021, fanmeeting 2025)
- Sungah (성아) (March 2012 – January 2019) (on hiatus from April of 2017 until her departure) (fanmeeting 2025)
- Sojin (소진) (January 2015 – February 2019) (performance 2021, fanmeeting 2025)
- Keumjo (금조) (January 2015 – February 2019) (performance 2021, fanmeeting 2025)

== Discography ==
=== Studio albums ===
Title	Details	Peak chart positions	Sales
Title	Details	KOR	Sales
Prima Donna	Released: October 14, 2013; Label: Star Empire Entertainment; Format: CD, digital download	7	KOR: 7,204

=== Reissues ===
Title	Details	Peak chart positions	Sales
Title	Details	KOR	Sales
Muses Diary Part 3: Love City	Released: August 3, 2017; Label: Star Empire Entertainment; Formats: CD, digital download	12	KOR: 4,559

=== Extended plays ===
Title	Details	Peak chart positions		Sales
Title	Details	KOR	US World	Sales
Sweet Rendezvous	Released: March 8, 2012; Label: Star Empire Entertainment; Format: CD, digital download	6	—	KOR: 4,272
Wild	Released: May 9, 2013; Label: Star Empire Entertainment; Format: CD, digital download; Track listing: 1. Intro: Spotlight; 2. Wild (와일드); 3. Action; 4. Paper Scraps (휴지조각); 5. Living Person (사는 사람); 6. Wild (instr.)	4	—	KOR: 5,633
Drama	Released: January 23, 2015; Label: Star Empire Entertainment; Format: CD, digital download	4	—	KOR: 7,978
9Muses S/S Edition	Released: July 2, 2015; Label: Star Empire Entertainment; Format: CD, digital download	5	8	KOR: 7,873
Lost	Released: November 24, 2015; Label: Star Empire Entertainment; Format: CD, digital download; Track listing: 1. Intro: A.M 3:00; 2. Sleepless Night (잠은 안오고 배는 고프고); 3. Secret (몰래); 4. Koong Chit Dak Chit (쿵치딱치); 5. To.Mine; 6. Sleepless Night (instr.)	10	—	KOR: 7,931
Muses Diary Part.2: Identity	Released: June 19, 2017; Label: Star Empire Entertainment; Format: CD, digital download	5	15	KOR: 8,092
"—" denotes releases that did not chart or were not released in that region.

=== Single albums ===
Title	Details	Peak chart positions	Sales
Title	Details	KOR	Sales
Let’s Have A Party	Released: August 12, 2010; Label: Star Empire Entertainment; Format: CD, digital download	18	KOR: 1,052
Dolls	Released: January 24, 2013; Label: Star Empire Entertainment; Format: CD, digital download	9	KOR: 3,533

=== Singles ===
Title	Year	Peak chart positions			Sales (DL)	Album
Title	Year	KOR	KOR Hot	US World	Sales (DL)	Album
"No Playboy"	2010	56	*	—	—N/a	Let's Have a Party
"Ladies"	2010	—	*	—	—N/a	Let's Have a Party
"Figaro" (휘가로)	2011	66	82	—	KOR: 297,735	Sweet Rendezvous
"News" (뉴스)	2012	36	46	—	KOR: 837,866	Sweet Rendezvous
"Ticket" (티켓)	2012	33	41	—	KOR: 473,177	Sweet Rendezvous
"Dolls" (돌스)	2013	17	19	—	KOR: 480,454	Dolls
"Wild" (와일드)	2013	22	18	—	KOR: 396,053	Wild
"Gun" (건)	2013	16	36	—	KOR: 207,723	Prima Donna
"Glue" (글루)	2013	24	26	—	KOR: 179,434	Non-album single
"Drama" (드라마)	2015	13	*	—	KOR: 301,993	Drama
"Hurt Locker" (다쳐)	2015	32	*	20	KOR: 176,198	9Muses S/S Edition
"Sleepless Night" (잠은 안오고 배는 고프고)	2015	26	*	—	KOR: 76,236	Lost
"Remember" (기억해)	2017	— (Note: "Remember" did not enter the Gaon Digital chart top 100, but peaked at no. 95 on the Download component chart.)	*	—	KOR: 17,464	Muses Diary Part.2 : Identity
"Love City" (러브시티)	2017	—	*	—	—N/a	Muses Diary Part.3 : Love City
"Remember"	2019	—	—	—	—N/a	Non-album single
"—" denotes releases that did not chart or were not released in that region.

=== Collaborations ===
Title	Year	Peak chart positions	Album
Title	Year	KOR Hot	Album
"Give Me" (with Seo In-young)	2010	*	Prosecutor Princess OST
"Shooting Star" (with Seo In-young, ZE:A, Park Jung-ah, and Jewelry)	2011	—	Non-album singles
"Win the Day" (with 2PM, 4Minute, MBLAQ, Miss A, Dal Shabet, Sistar, ZE:A, and B1A4)	2012	—	Non-album singles
"Get Up" (with Rhythm Power)	2012	87	Non-album singles
"I Need Your Love" (with Kim Jong-min and Tak Jae-hoon)	2012	—	Non-album singles

== Videography ==
=== Music videos ===
Year	Title	Director(s)	References
2010	"No Playboy"	Gang Jong Myeong	
2011	"Figaro"	Park Ji-ho	
2012	"News"	Saem; Serin	
2012	"Ticket"	Zanybros	
2013	"Dolls"	Tiger Cave	
2013	"Wild"	Zanybros	
2013	"Gun"	Zanybros	
2013	"Glue"	Zanybros	
2015	"Drama"	Zanybros	
2015	"Hurt Locker"	Zanybros	
2015	"Sleepless Night"	Zanybros	(Note: Lost (photobook). Nine Muses. South Korea: kt music. 2015. Staff.)
2017	"Remember"	Zanybros	—N/a
2017	"Love City"	Zanybros	—N/a
2018	"To. Mine"	—N/a	—N/a
2019	"Remember"	—N/a	—N/a

== Concerts ==
Headlining

- Muse in the City (Seoul, 2016)
- Re:Mine (Seoul, 2017)
- MUSE : on (Seoul, 2025)

== Awards and nominations ==
Year	Award	Category	Nominated work	Result	Ref.
2010	Korean Beauty Design Expo	Popular Beauty Star Award	—N/a	Won	
2010	Korean Culture Entertainment Awards	Top Ten Singers Award	—N/a	Won	
2010	Mnet Asian Music Awards	Best New Artist	"No Playboy"	Nominated	
2013	Asian Model Awards	Best New Artist	—N/a	Won	
2016	Korean Entertainment Art Awards	Best Female Group	—N/a	Won	

== See also ==
- Muses in popular culture
