= N-Sonic =

South Korean boy band

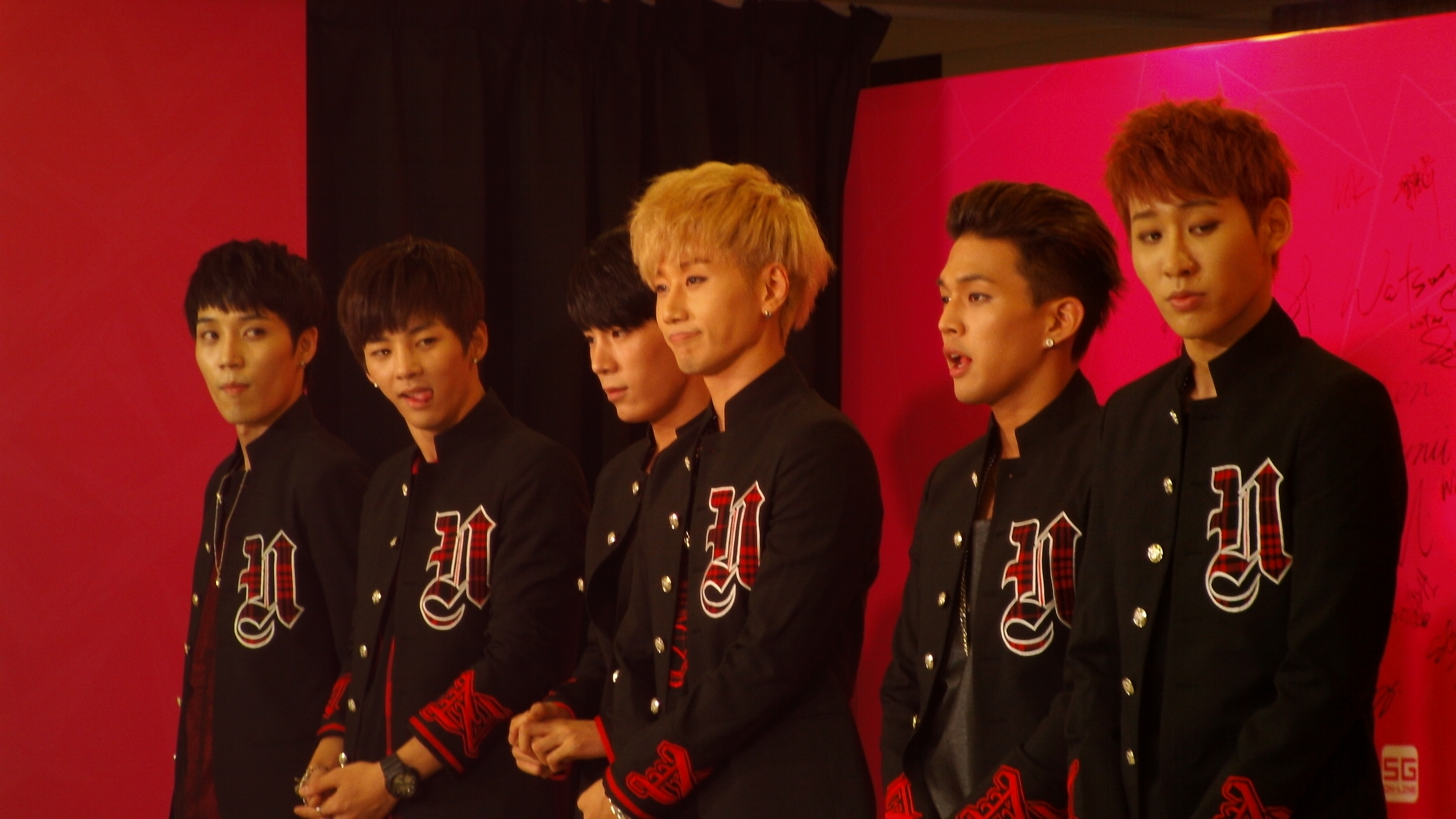

Background information
- Origin: South Korea
- Genres: K-pop; Dance pop
- Years active: 2011–2016
- Labels: C2K Entertainment
- Past members: Eun-ho; Jong-wook; Yeon-jun; J-Heart; Min-ki; Si-hoo; Choi Byul; Zion; Bong-jun

N-Sonic was a South Korean boy band consisting of J-Heart, Min-ki, Si-hoo, Choi Byul, Zion, and Bong-jun. They released their first EP We Are SuperBoys on October 6, 2011.

== History ==
N-Sonic debuted on October 6, 2011 with the EP We Are SuperBoys, with a lineup of 5 members: J-Heart, Eun-ho, Jong-wook, Bong-jun and Choi Byul. Without being able to achieve great success in Korea, the group turned their promotion efforts to Japan and China.

On February 3, 2012, N-Sonic held their first concert in Japan, and later that month, on February 16, they announced their fandom name Super Sonic. On February 25, members Eunho and Jonguk left the group for personal reasons. It was later announced that the group would be adding 4 new members, who were revealed on October 10, 2012 to be Zion, Min-ki, Yeon-jun and Si-hoo.

Despite new domestic releases in March and October of 2013, the group continued to promote mainly in Japan, particularly in summer concerts. On October 8, 2013, member Yeon-jun left the group for personal reasons. N-Sonic held their first fan meeting and their first solo full concert in December of the same year, in Japan.

In 2014, N-Sonic released their first single in Mandarin Chinese, representing their debut in China. From late 2014 to 2016, the group was mostly active in Japan and Korea, releasing numerous comebacks. On May 9, 2016, after performing concerts in Japan, the group returned to Korea and immediately cut off communications with their agency, C2K Entertainment, while they sought an attorney to terminate the group's seven-year exclusive contract that they were only approximately three years into. They reportedly filed a formal request for contract termination on May 17. After failing to appear at multiple scheduled events after the group's return to Korea, C2K Entertainment took legal action against the members of N-Sonic on May 24, asking for compensation for "damages resulting from their breach of contract", and on June 22, 2017, the Seoul Central District Court's civil affairs department ruled against the plaintiff (C2K Entertainment), ending the conflict.

== Discography ==
=== Albums ===
==== Mini-albums ====
Title	Album details	Peak chart positions	Sales
Title	Album details	Gaon Album Chart	Sales
Into the Light	Released: October 23, 2013; Label: C2K Entertainment; Format: CD, digital download	39	KOR: 713
Reset	Released: June 9, 2014; Label: C2K Entertainment; Format: CD, digital download	30	
Another Progress	Released: March 24, 2015; Label: C2K Entertainment; Format: CD, digital download	22	KOR: 513

=== Singles ===
Title	Year	Peak chart positions	Sales (DL)	Release
Title	Year	Gaon Digital Chart	Sales (DL)	Release
"Super Boy"	2011	—		We Are SuperBoys
"Lie"	2013	—		N-Sonic 2nd Single
"Run & Run"	2013	—		Into the Light
"Crazy" (미치겠네; Michigenne)	2014	—		Non-album single
"Pop Beyond" (빠삐용; Ppappiyong)	2014	—		Reset
"Blackout"	2015	—		Another Progress
"Steal My Heart" (내 마음을 뺏어봐 (取奪我心))	2015	—		Non-album single
"Excalibur"	2016	—		Non-album single

=== Soundtrack appearances ===
List of soundtrack songs, showing year released and soundtrack name
Title	Year	Soundtrack
"I Miss You" (그리워요; Geuriwoyo)	2014	My Lovely Girl OST

== Awards and nominations ==
2014: Hong Kong Asian-Pop Music Festival: Best Stage Performance Award (Won)

2014: Metro Radio Mandarin Hits Music Awards: Newcomer and Dance Music (Both won)

2014: Metro Radio Hits Music Awards: Best Song (Won)

2015: Metro Radio Mandarin Hits Music Awards: Favorite Singer (Won)

2016: TVB8 Mandarin Music On Demand Awards (Won)
