= HeartB =

South Korean boy band

- Origin: South Korea
- Genres: Ballad
- Years active: 2014–2015
- Label: MarblePop
- Members: Dojin; Jinwook; Chanyeong; Byulha

HeartB (Korean: 하트비) is a South Korean boy band formed by MarblePop Entertainment. The group consists of four members: Dojin, Jinwook, Chanyeong, and Byulha. They start their pre-debut activity releasing single "Shine" on December 3, 2014 and then made their official debut with mini album "Remember" on May 6, 2015.

== History ==
=== Pre-debut ===
HeartB started their activity with the release of short teaser for their first digital single "Shine" on November 30, 2014. The video teaser featured a short narration by announcer Choi Hee. The single "Shine" was released on December 3, 2014 as digital single without promotional music video or physical copy. The group intended to have a "no face, just voice" concept by releasing the song with no accompanying music video and no promotional appearances on music shows as a way to appeal with their skills first.

On January 7, 2015 the group released the song "Missing You", featuring Zia. It was accompanied by a music video following the story of a woman and a man experiencing a bus accident. It featured an appearance by Dojin, making him the first member of the group to be revealed. Despite no promotional appearances, the digital release charted number one on several music sites.

=== 2015: Official debut, Remember, and Beautiful Story ===
On May 6, HeartB released the mini album Remember, which included their previously released singles, "Shine" and "Missing You", along with two new songs and the title track "Remember". The group promoted the song on various music shows and radio shows.

On July 31, HeartB announced a collaboration with Jung Jaewook for a remake of "With My Eyes Closed".

On September 14, the group released their second mini album Mi Story (Korean: 美STORY, lit. 'Beautiful Story') with the title track "Beautiful", which features the rapper Andup. Dojin participated in the writing of lyrics for all of the songs while Byulha participated in the composing of two. The group promoted the song on both radio shows and music shows, and did a number of busking events.

On November 9, the group released their fourth digital single "A Song For You".

== Members ==
- Dojin (도진)
- Jinwook (김진욱)
- Chanyeong (찬영)
- Byulha (별하)

== Discography ==
=== Extended plays ===
Title	Album details	Peak chart positions	Sales
Title	Album details	KOR	Sales
Remember	Released: May 6, 2015; Label: MarblePop; Format: CD, digital download	13	KOR: 893
Beautiful Story (美Story)	Released: September 15, 2015; Label: MarblePop; Format: CD, digital download	20	KOR: 801

=== Singles ===
Title	Year	Peak chart positions	Sales	Album
Title	Year	KOR	Sales	Album
"Shine" (선택해줘)	2014	—		Non-album single
"Missing You" (혼잣말) (with Zia)	2015	28	KOR: 98,951	Remember
"Remember" (밥 한공기)	2015	—		Remember
"With My Eyes Closed" (가만히 눈을 감고)	2015	—		Non-album single
"Beautiful" (feat. Andup)	2015	—		Beautiful Story
"A Song For You" (#너로만든노래)	2015	—		Non-album single
"—" denotes release did not chart.
