= D.Holic =

South Korean girl group

- Origin: Seoul, South Korea
- Genres: K-pop; dance
- Years active: 2014–2017
- Labels: Star Road Entertainment
- Past members: Nine; Danbee; Duri; Hami; Rena; Hwajung; EJ; Nayoung; Youjin
- Website: starroadent.com

D.Holic (Korean: 디홀릭) was a South Korean girl group formed by Star Road Entertainment (formerly H.Mate Entertainment) in 2014 with five members. Nine left the group in August 2015, for personal reasons, and was replaced by a new member, Hwajung. In July 2016, it was revealed through teasers that Danbee and Duri had decided to leave the group. A new member, EJ, was added to the line-up. In February 2017, it was confirmed through a performance that members Hami and Hwajung had departed from the group. They were temporarily replaced with new members, Nayoung and Youjin, although they never officially made their debut. In July 2017, EJ announced that she would be leaving the group to pursue a modelling career. The group informally disbanded after the departure of all but one member, with the aim of re-debuting the remaining member, Rena, into a new girl group within a year. The group has released one mini-album: Chewy (2015) and three single albums: D.Holic Dark With Dignity (2014), Murphy & Sally (2015), and Color Me Rad (2016).

== Former members ==
- Nine (나인)
- Danbee (단비)
- Duri (두리)
- Hami (하미) [Xu Xiaohan (Chinese: 许晓晗)]
- Rena (레나)
- Hwajung (화정)
- EJ (이제이)
- Nayoung (나영)
- Youjin (유진)

== Discography ==
=== Extended plays ===
Title	Details	Peak chart positions	Sales
Title	Details	KOR	Sales
Chewy	Released: July 7, 2015; Label: H.Mate Entertainment, NHN Entertainment; Format: CD, digital download; track listing: 1. Chewing Jelly intro 2. Chewy (쫄깃쫄깃); 3. Miss You; 4. Chewy (쫄깃쫄깃) Japanese ver.; 5. Miss You Japanese ver.; 6. Chewy (쫄깃쫄깃) Chinese ver.; 7. Hola Hola outro 8. Chewy (쫄깃쫄깃) inst.; 9. Miss You inst.	19	KOR: 624+

=== Single albums ===
Title	Details	Peak chart positions	Sales
Title	Details	KOR	Sales
D.Holic Dark With Dignity	Released: October 24, 2014; Label: H.Mate Entertainment, NHN Entertainment; Format: CD, digital download; Track listing: 1. I Don't Know (몰라요); 2. Without You; 3. Without You inst.	—	—
Murphy and Sally	Released: November 11, 2015; Label: H.Mate Entertainment, NHN Entertainment; Format: CD, digital download; Track listing: 1. Murphy and Sally (머피와 샐리); 2. Just That Much (딱 그만큼); 3. Murphy And Sally (머피와 샐리) inst.; 4. Just That Much (딱 그만큼) inst.	33	—
Color Me Rad	Released: July 29, 2016; Label: H.Mate Entertainment, CJ E&M; Format: CD, digital download; Track listing: 1. Color Me Rad; 2. So Tight; 3. Color Me Rad inst.; 4. So Tight inst.	—	—
"—" denotes releases that did not chart.

=== Singles ===
Title	Year	Peak chart positions	Sales	Album
Title	Year	KOR	Sales	Album
"I Don’t Know" (몰라요)	2014	—	—	Dark with Dignity
"Without You"	2014	—	—	Dark with Dignity
"Chewy" (쫄깃쫄깃)	2015	— (Note: "Chewy" did not enter the Gaon Digital chart top 100, but peaked at no. 267 on Gaon Download chart.)	KOR: 4,605	Chewy
"Murphy and Sally" (머피와 샐리)	2015	—	—	Murphy and Sally
"Color Me Rad"	2016	—	—	Color Me Rad
"—" denotes releases that did not chart.
