= Year 7 Class 1 =

South Korean girl group

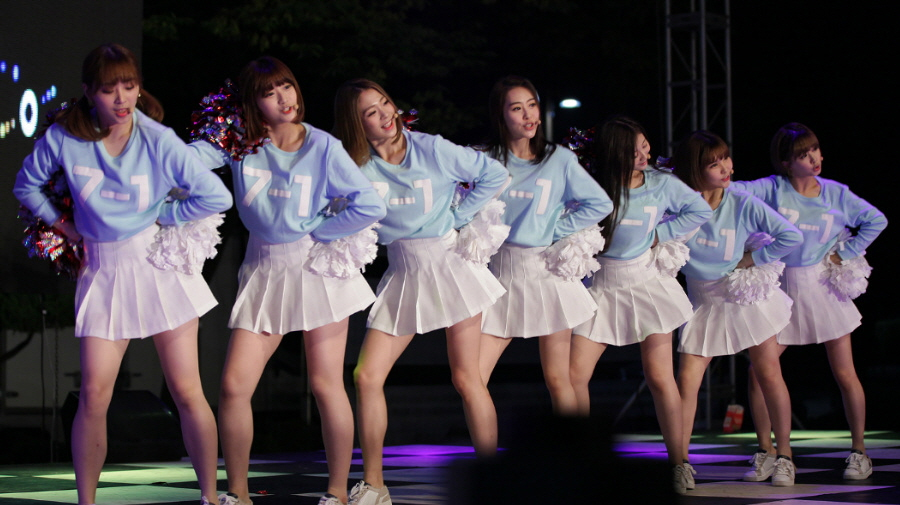

Background information
- Origin: Seoul, South Korea
- Genres: K-pop; Dance-pop
- Years active: 2014–2018
- Labels: DRB Entertainment
- Past members: Baek Se-hee; Kang Min-ju; Shin Ee-rang; Kwon So-jung; Han Bit-na; Yoo Hwa; Go Eun-sil

Year 7 Class 1 (Korean: 칠학년일반) is a South Korean girl group formed by DRB Entertainment in Seoul, South Korea. The group debuted on January 24, 2014 with "Oppa Virus".

== Members ==
- Baek Se-hee (백세희)
- Kang Min-ju (강민주)
- Shin Ee-rang (신이랑)
- Kwon So-jung (권소정)
- Han Bit-na (한빛나)
- Yoo Hwa (유화)
- Go Eun-sil (고은실)

== Discography ==
=== Extended plays ===
Title	Album details	Peak chart positions	Sales
Title	Album details	KOR	Sales
Believe	Released: November 4, 2015; Label: DRB Entertainment, Sony Music; Formats: CD, digital download	26	KOR: 673
