= 2012 in South Korean music =

The following is a list of notable events and releases that happened in 2012 in music in South Korea.

== Notable events and achievements ==
- January 11–12 – the 26th Golden Disc Awards take place, the first time it was held in January. Super Junior and Girls' Generation win the grand prizes.
- January 31 – Girls' Generation become the first K-pop group to appear on an American late night talk show, performing the English version of "The Boys" on the Late Show with David Letterman.
- February 1 – Girls' Generation similarly appear on Live! with Kelly, the first U.S. morning talk show appearance from a K-pop artist.
- February 29 – Kiha & The Faces and IU win the grand prizes at the 18th Korean Music Awards.
- June – The Korean music industry grosses nearly $3.4 billion in the first half of 2012, according to Billboard estimates, a 27.8% increase from the same period a year prior.
- June 22 – Show Me the Money airs its first season, which is considered a pivotal work in making hip hop a mainstream genre in South Korea.
- July 28 – 2NE1 embark on their New Evolution Global Tour, considered the first world tour by a K-pop girl group.
- September 10 – Big Bang announces their three concert dome tour in Japan, making them the first Korean artist to perform at three dome stadiums in a single tour.
- September 26 – Psy's "Gangnam Style" attains a peak of number 2 on the Billboard Hot 100, the highest for a K-pop song on the chart.
- October 16 – KCON 2012 takes place at the Verizon Amphitheater in Irvine, California, the first K-pop dedicated convention in the United States.
- November 18 – Psy becomes the first Korean artist to perform at the American Music Awards.
- November 19 – The third annual Korean Popular Culture and Arts Awards take place. Psy, Song Chang-sik and Geum Sa-hyang are awarded the Order of Cultural Merit; Park Seong-yeon and Kim Chang-wan receive the Presidential Commendation; and Na Yoon-sun, 2NE1 and Lee Eun-ha receive the Prime Minister's Commendation.
- November 24 – "Gangnam Style" becomes the most viewed video on YouTube with 805 million views, surpassing Justin Bieber's "Baby".
- November 30 – Psy, BigBang, and Super Junior win the grand prizes at the 2012 MAMA.
- December 14 – Busker Busker, Beast and Psy win the grand prizes at the annual Melon Music Awards.
- December 18 – "Gangnam Style" is ranked number one on YouTube's list of top trending video of 2012.
- December 21 – The music video for Gangnam Style" becomes the first video in YouTube history to surpass 1 billion views.

== Award shows and festivals ==
=== Award ceremonies ===
2012 music award ceremonies in South Korea
Date	Event	Host
January 11–12, 2012	26th Golden Disc Awards	Ilgan Sports and JTBC Plus
January 19, 2012	21st Seoul Music Awards	Sports Seoul
February 22, 2012	1st Gaon Chart Music Awards	Korea Music Content Association
February 29, 2012	18th Korean Music Awards	Korean Popular Music Awards Committee
November 19, 2012	3rd Korean Popular Culture and Arts Awards	Korea Creative Content Agency
November 30, 2012	14th Mnet Asian Music Awards	CJ E&M (Mnet)
December 14, 2012	4th Melon Music Awards	Kakao M

=== Festivals ===
2012 televised music festivals in South Korea
Date	Event	Host
December 28, 2012	KBS Song Festival	Korean Broadcasting System (KBS)
December 29, 2012	SBS Gayo Daejeon	Seoul Broadcasting System (SBS)
December 31, 2012	MBC Gayo Daejejeon	Munhwa Broadcasting Corporation (MBC)

== Debuting and disbanded in 2012 ==
=== Debuted groups ===
- 100%
- 15&
- 24K
- 2BiC
- A.cian
- A-Jax
- A-Prince
- AOA
- B.A.P
- Big Star
- BTOB
- C-Clown
- Crayon Pop
- Cross Gene
- D-Unit
- EvoL
- EXID
- EXO
- Fiestar
- From the Airport
- Gangkiz
- Girls' Generation-TTS
- GLAM
- Hello Venus
- Hyungdon and Daejun
- JJ Project
- Lunafly
- Mr. Mr.
- NU'EST
- Puretty
- Rainbow Pixie
- She'z
- Skarf
- Skull & Haha
- Spica
- Sunny Days
- Tahiti
- Tasty
- The Barberettes
- The SeeYa
- The Solutions
- Tiny-G
- Two X
- VIXX
- Wonder Boyz
- ZE:A Five

=== Solo debuts ===
- Ailee
- Allen Kim
- Anda
- Baek A-yeon
- Ben
- Han Seung-yeon
- John Park
- Juniel
- Kim Sung-kyu
- Lee Hi
- Loco
- Stephanie
- Yong Jun-hyung

=== Disbanded groups ===
- 2NB
- Big Mama
- Black Pearl
- Broken Valentine
- JQT
- Loveholics
- T-max

== Releases in 2012 ==
=== First quarter ===
==== January ====
Date	Title	Artist	Genre(s)
3	Funky Town	T-ara	Dance, Disco
5	Neo Spirit	NS Yoon-G	Pop
5	It's	Teen Top	Dance
10	100% Ver.	MBLAQ	Pop, Dance
13	The Grasshoppers	Sunny Hill	Dance
20	Vintage	Wanted	K-pop
26	Warrior	B.A.P	Hip-hop, R&B
27	Hit U	Dal Shabet	Dance
31	Grown-Up	F.T. Island	Rock

==== February ====
Date	Title	Artist	Genre(s)
1	Se7en Second Mini Album	Se7en	R&B, Pop
2	Welcome To The Block	Block B	Hip-hop
6	Thank You	F-iV	R&B, Ballad
7	New Breed	Jay Park	Hip-hop, R&B
8	Russian Roulette	Spica	Dance, R&B
9	My Angel	M. Street	Ballad
14	I Need You	K.Will	Ballad
20	Touch	Miss A	Dance, Electronic
22	Re-Issue	Brave Girls	Dance
29	Alive	Big Bang	Electronic, Hip-hop

==== March ====
Date	Title	Artist	Genre(s)
7	Love Diary	C-Real	Dance
8	Sweet Rendezvous	Nine Muses	Dance
12	F.Scott Fitzgerald's Way Of Love	2AM	Pop, R&B
14	Ignition	B1A4	Dance
19	Sherlock	Shinee	Electronic, R&B
20	The Boys Becomes Adult	Monni	Rock
23	The Return	Shinhwa	Dance
26	Ear Fun	CNBLUE	Pop rock
29	Painkiller	Spica	Dance, R&B

=== Second quarter ===
==== April ====
Date	Title	Artist	Genre(s)
3	Born to Beat	BtoB	Dance
9	Mama	Exo-K	Electronica, R&B
9	Volume Up	4Minute	Electropop
10	Slip Away	Nell	Rock
12	Alone	Sistar	Dance, R&B
12	2 Guys	Baechigi	Hip hop
17	Spaceensum	Daybreak	Rock
18	Everyday II	Girl's Day	Dance, ballad
25	DoraDora	U-KISS	Electropop
27	Power	B.A.P	Hip-hop, Pop punk
27	For Century Ultimate Zest	F.Cuz	Dance
28	Spring	Park Jin Young	R&B, Ballad
29	Twinkle	Girls' Generation-TTS	Dance, Electropop
30	Welcome To The Block (repackage)	Block B	Hip hop

==== May ====
Date	Title	Artist	Genre(s)
8	"Bounce"	JJ Project	Hiphop
9	Une Année	Apink	Dance
9	Venus	Hello Venus	Dance
10	Ulala Sensation Part 1	Ulala Session	Pop
10	Shade	Broken Valentine	Rock
11	Spring of a Twenty Year Old	IU	Ballad
14	Tarantallegra	Kim Junsu (JYJ)	Pop
15	Infinitize	Infinite	Dance
16	State of Emergency	DMTN	Dance
17	Ulala Sensation Part 2	Ulala Session	Pop
21	2PM Member's Selection	2PM	Dance, R&B
21	Bloom	G.NA	Pop
23	Born to Beat (Asia Special Edition)	BTOB	Dance
24	Ignition (Special Edition)	B1A4	Dance
27	Good Boy	Baek Ji-young	K-pop
30	Illusion	M.I.B	Hip-hop

==== June ====
Date	Title	Artist	Genre(s)
1	Myname 1st Single	Myname	R&B
3	Still Alive	Big Bang	Dance, Hip-hop
3	Wonder Party	Wonder Girls	Dance, Ballad
4	Artist	Teen Top	Dance
5	The Special To Kiss Me	U-KISS	Dance
6	Bang Bang	Dal Shabet	Dance, Electropop
7	My First June	Juniel	Pop rock
8	Timeless: Begins	Cross Gene	Electronic
13	Electric Shock	f(x)	Electropop
13	Love Style	Boyfriend	Dance
20	Flashback	After School	Pop, Dance
22	Hu+man	2BiC	R&B
25	I'm Da One	Jo Kwon	Dance
28	Loving U	Sistar	Dance, R&B

=== Third quarter ===
==== July ====
Date	Title	Artist	Genre(s)
3	Day by Day	T-ara	Dance
4	Sexy, Free & Single	Super Junior	R&B, Electropop
4	Like a Wave	Hello Venus	Dance
4	Spectacular	ZE:A	Dance
8	23, Male, Single	Jang Wooyoung	Dance
10	Run to You	LED Apple	Pop rock
11	Action	Nu'est	Dance
12	Bigstart	Big Star	Dance
15	Psy 6 (Six Rules), Part 1	Psy	Dance, Hip-hop
18	Skinship	NS Yoon-G	Pop
19	No Mercy	B.A.P	Hip-hop, Pop
19	Not Alone	C-Clown	Dance
22	Midnight Sun	Beast	Dance
22	Only One	BoA	Dance, R&B
27	Racer	Chaos	Dance

==== August ====
Date	Title	Artist	Genre(s)
2	Welcome to Business	D-Unit	Dance
3	Summer Special 'Be Ma Girl'	Teen Top	K-pop, R&B
6	Spy (Sexy, Free & Single Repackage)	Super Junior	R&B, Electropop
9	Spectrum	Tasty	Dance
10	Let Me Explode!	EvoL	Dance
13	Hippity Hop	EXID	Dance, R&B
14	Rising Sun	E7	Dance
16	Phantom City	Phantom	Hip-hop
16	Mystery	Able	Dance
20	Double Up	Two X	Dance
22	Pandora	Kara	Synthpop
23	Sol Bi Neun Ottugi	Sol Bi	Dance
27	Phoenix	ZE:A	Pop
30	Crash	B.A.P	Hip-hop, Pop
31	Vista	Fiestar	Dance

==== September ====
Date	Title	Artist	Genre(s)
4	Mirage	T-ara	Dance
10	I'm Baek	Baek A-Yeon	R&B
10	Five Treasure Box	F.T. Island	Rock
12	Press Play	BtoB	Dance, R&B
12	Lipstick	Orange Caramel	Dance, Electropop
13	Poison	Secret	Dance, Electropop
15	One of a Kind	G-Dragon	Hip-hop
20	Stop Girl	U-KISS	Dance
20	Hypnotize	Anda	Pop
20	Principle of My Soul	Naul	R&B
24	Catch Me	TVXQ	R&B, Electropop
29	Girl's Secret Party	84LY	Pop

=== Fourth quarter ===
==== October ====
Date	Title	Artist	Genre(s)
4	Blossom	Big Star	Dance
5	Talk About S	Gain	Dance, Electronic
10	2.0	10cm	Acoustic folk
11	The Third Album Part 1	K.Will	Ballad
15	Independent Women Part III	Miss A	Dance
16	Blockbuster	Block B	Dance, Hip-hop
16	Invitation	Ailee	Dance
16	Open The Door	Wonder Boyz	Hip-hop
19	99	Epik High	Hip hop
21	Melting	Hyuna	Dance, Hip-hop
23	Stop It	B.A.P	Hip-hop, R&B
24	Vol. 5 Be Renewed	Chu Ga-yeoul	Folk
31	PYL Younique Volume 1	Younique Unit	Dance

==== November ====
Date	Title	Artist	Genre(s)
1	Journey Home	Kim Jong Kook	Pop
6	Hello	A-Prince	Dance
7	The Next Big Thing	Roh Ji-hoon	Dance
8	Janus	Boyfriend	Dance
8	I Will Protect	SM☆SH	Pop
9	We Don’t Stop	Fiestar	Dance
12	In the Wind	B1A4	Dance
13	Have, Don't Have	Dal Shabet	Dance, Synthpop
15	2MYX	A-Jax	Dance
15	Young Love	C-Clown	Pop
19	Another Me	Kim Sung-kyu	Pop rock
20	1&1	Juniel	Pop rock
21	Lonely	Spica	Dance, R&B
22	Forest	Lee Seung-gi	Ballad
26	Humanoids	TVXQ	Electronica, Dance
26	The First Collage	Yang Yo-seob	R&B
28	I Got The Feeling	Big Star	Dance
30	Kara Collection	Kara	Dance

==== December ====
Date	Title	Artist	Genre(s)
4	Now and Forever	Wax	R&B, Ballad
6	Love U	The SeeYa	R&B
11	5 Point 5	Joosuc	Hip-hop
12	What Are You Doing Today?	Hello Venus	Dance
13	Antique Romance	Sunny Hill	Dance

== Charts ==
- List of number-one hits of 2012 (South Korea)
- List of number-one albums of 2012 (South Korea)

== See also ==
- 2012 in South Korea
- List of South Korean films of 2012
