= List of South Korean idol groups (2010s) =

These notable South Korean idol groups debuted in the 2010s. Only groups that have an article in Wikipedia are listed here.

== 2010 ==
- Coed School
- DMTN
- F.Cuz
- Girl's Day
- GD & TOP
- GP Basic
- Homme
- Infinite
- JYJ
- Led Apple
- Miss A
- Nine Muses
- One Way
- Orange Caramel
- Rooftop Moonlight
- Rhythm Power
- Sistar
- Standing Egg
- Teen Top
- Touch
- The Boss
- ZE:A

== 2011 ==
- AA
- Apeace
- Apink
- B1A4
- Blady
- Block B
- Boyfriend
- Brave Girls
- C-REAL
- Chocolat
- Clover
- Dal Shabet
- F-ve Dolls
- Geeks
- Kim Heechul & Kim Jungmo
- M.I.B
- Myname
- N-Sonic
- N-Train
- Rania
- Sistar19
- Stellar
- Super Junior-D&E
- Trouble Maker
- Ulala Session

== 2012 ==
- 100%
- 15&
- 24K
- A.cian
- A-Jax
- A-Prince
- AOA
- B.A.P
- Big Star
- BtoB
- C-Clown
- Crayon Pop
- Cross Gene
- D-Unit
- EvoL
- EXID
- Exo
- Fiestar
- Gangkiz
- Girls' Generation-TTS
- Glam
- Hello Venus
- Honey G
- JJ Project
- Lunafly
- Mr.Mr.
- NU'EST
- Phantom
- Puretty
- She'z
- Skarf
- Speed
- Spica
- Sunny Days
- Tahiti
- Tasty
- The SeeYa
- Tiny-G
- Two X
- VIXX
- Wonder Boyz

== 2013 ==
- 2Eyes
- 2Yoon
- 5urprise
- AlphaBat
- AOA Black
- Bestie
- Boys Republic
- BTS
- GI
- History
- Infinite H
- Ladies' Code
- LC9
- M.Pire
- QBS
- Royal Pirates
- Soohyun & Hoon
- T-ara N4
- Topp Dogg
- Wassup

== 2014 ==
- 2000 Won
- 4L
- 4Ten
- AKMU
- Almeng
- B.I.G
- Badkiz
- Be.A
- Beatwin
- Berry Good
- Bigflo
- Bob Girls
- Bursters
- D.Holic
- GD X Taeyang
- Got7
- HALO
- HeartB
- Hi Suhyun
- High4
- Hotshot
- Infinite F
- JJCC
- Laboum
- Lip Service
- Lovelyz
- Madtown
- Mamamoo
- Melody Day
- Minx
- Nasty Nasty
- Play the Siren
- Red Velvet
- Sonamoo
- Strawberry Milk
- The Barberettes
- The Legend
- ToHeart
- Troy
- Uniq
- Wings
- Winner
- Year 7 Class 1

== 2015 ==
- 1Punch
- April
- Bastarz
- CLC
- Day6
- DIA
- GFriend
- IKon
- MAP6
- MAS
- Monsta X
- MyB
- N.Flying
- Oh My Girl
- Playback
- Romeo
- Rubber Soul
- Seventeen
- Snuper
- Twice
- Unicorn
- UP10TION
- VAV
- VIXX LR

== 2016 ==
- AOA Cream
- Astro
- Blackpink
- Bolbbalgan4
- Boys24
- BtoB Blue
- CocoSori
- Double S 301
- Exo-CBX
- Gugudan
- I.B.I
- I.O.I
- Imfact
- KNK
- MASC
- MOBB
- Momoland
- NCT
- NCT U
- NCT 127
- NCT Dream
- Nine Muses A
- Pentagon
- SF9
- The East Light
- Unnies
- Victon
- Vromance
- WJSN

== 2017 ==
- 14U
- 3RACHA
- A.C.E
- Be.A
- Boy Story
- Busters
- Dreamcatcher
- Duetto
- Elris
- Favorite
- Golden Child
- Good Day
- GreatGuys
- HashTag
- Highlight
- Honeyst
- Hyeongseop X Euiwoong
- IN2IT
- IZ
- JBJ
- Kard
- Longguo & Shihyun
- M.O.N.T
- Mind U
- MVP
- MXM
- Myteen
- NU'EST W
- ONF
- P.O.P
- Pristin
- Rainz
- S.I.S
- Seven O'Clock
- Stray Kids
- The Boyz
- The Rose
- TRCNG
- Triple H
- TST
- Varsity
- Wanna One
- Weki Meki

== 2018 ==
- A Train to Autumn
- Ateez
- D-Crunch
- Dream Note
- Fromis 9
- (G)I-dle
- Girlkind
- Gugudan SeMiNa
- GWSN
- Honey Popcorn
- Iz*One
- JBJ95
- K/DA
- Loona
- Maywish
- Nature
- NeonPunch
- Noir
- NTB
- Oh!GG
- Pink Fantasy
- Pristin V
- Saturday
- Spectrum
- Target
- UNB
- Uni.T
- W24
- We Girls
- WJMK
- Xeno-T

== 2019 ==
- 1Team
- 1the9
- 3YE
- AB6IX
- Ariaz
- Argon
- BDC
- Bvndit
- Cherry Bullet
- CIX
- D1CE
- DKZ
- ENOi
- Everglow
- Exo-SC
- Fanatics
- Hinapia
- Hoppipolla
- Itzy
- Jus2
- MustB
- Newkidd
- Oneus
- Onewe
- OnlyOneOf
- Purple Rain
- Purplebeck
- Rocket Punch
- SuperM
- Teen Teen
- Tomorrow X Together
- Vanner
- Verivery
- We in the Zone
- Wooseok x Kuanlin
- X1

== See also ==
- List of South Korean idol groups (1990s)
- List of South Korean idol groups (2000s)
- List of South Korean idol groups (2020s)
