= List of South Korean idol groups (2000s) =

These notable South Korean idol groups debuted in the 2000s. Only groups with articles on Wikipedia are listed here.

== 2000 ==
- Chakra
- Papaya
- UN

== 2001 ==
- 5tion
- Epik High
- Jewelry
- jtL
- K'Pop
- KISS
- M.I.L.K
- Sugar
- Shinvi

== 2002 ==
- Black Beat
- F-iV
- Isak N Jiyeon
- LUV
- MC the Max
- Noel

== 2003 ==
- Brown Eyed Soul
- Take
- TVXQ

== 2004 ==
- TRAX
- V.O.S

== 2005 ==
- Gavy NJ
- LPG
- Paran
- SS501
- Super Junior
- The Grace

== 2006 ==
- 2NB
- Big Bang
- Brown Eyed Girls
- Kangta & Vanness
- SeeYa
- Super Junior-K.R.Y.
- Untouchable

== 2007 ==
- Baby Vox Re.V
- Black Pearl
- F.T. Island
- Girls' Generation
- Kara
- Sunny Hill
- Super Junior-T
- Supernova
- T-max
- Tritops
- Wonder Girls

== 2008 ==
- 2AM
- 2PM
- Davichi
- Miss $
- Shinee
- Super Junior-H
- Super Junior-M
- U-KISS

== 2009 ==
- 2NE1
- 4Minute
- After School
- Beast
- CNBLUE
- f(x)
- JQT
- MBLAQ
- Rainbow
- Secret
- SHU-I
- T-ara
- Urban Zakapa

== See also ==
- List of South Korean idol groups (1990s)
- List of South Korean idol groups (2010s)
- List of South Korean idol groups (2020s)
