= List of South Korean idol groups (1990s) =

These notable South Korean idol groups debuted in the 1990s. Only groups with articles are listed here.

== 1992 ==
- Seo Taiji and Boys

== 1993 ==
- Deux

== 1994 ==
- Cool
- DJ D.O.C
- Roo'ra
- Two Two

== 1995 ==
- R.ef
- Turbo

== 1996 ==
- Goofy
- H.O.T.
- Uptown

== 1997 ==
- Baby V.O.X.
- Diva
- Jinusean
- NRG
- Sechs Kies
- S.E.S.
- U-BeS

== 1998 ==
- 1TYM
- 4Men
- Fin.K.L
- Koyote
- S#arp
- Shinhwa

== 1999 ==
- As One
- Cleo
- Click-B
- Fly to the Sky
- g.o.d
- T.T.MA

== See also ==
- List of South Korean idol groups (2000s)
- List of South Korean idol groups (2010s)
- List of South Korean idol groups (2020s)
