= List of South Korean idol groups (2020s) =

These notable South Korean idol groups debuted in the 2020s. Only groups that have an article in Wikipedia are listed here.

== 2020 ==
- Aespa
- Astro – Moonbin & Sanha
- B.O.Y
- BAE173
- Blackswan
- Botopass
- BtoB 4U
- Cignature
- Cravity
- Craxy
- DKB
- Drippin
- E'Last
- Enhypen
- Even of Day
- Ghost9
- H&D
- Lunarsolar
- MCND
- NiziU
- P1Harmony
- Redsquare
- Red Velvet – Irene & Seulgi
- Refund Sisters
- Secret Number
- SSAK3
- STAYC
- TO1
- Treasure
- UNVS
- Weeekly
- WEi
- Wooah

== 2021 ==
- Billlie
- Blitzers
- BugAboo
- Ciipher
- Epex
- Hot Issue
- Ichillin'
- Isegye Idol
- Ive
- Just B
- Lightsum
- Luminous
- Mirae
- NTX
- Omega X
- Pixy
- Purple Kiss
- TFN
- The KingDom
- Tri.be
- Xdinary Heroes

== 2022 ==
- &Team
- Aimers
- Astro – Jinjin & Rocky
- ATBO
- Blank2y
- Classy
- CSR
- Fifty Fifty
- Got the Beat
- H1-Key
- ILY:1
- Irris
- Kep1er
- Lapillus
- Le Sserafim
- Mamamoo+
- Mimiirose
- NewJeans
- Nmixx
- Superkind
- TAN
- Tempest
- TNX
- Trendz
- Viviz
- WSG Wannabe
- Younite

== 2023 ==
- 8Turn
- 82Major
- Ampers&One
- Babymonster
- BoyNextDoor
- BXB
- El7z Up
- Evnne
- Fantasy Boys
- Hori7on
- Kiss of Life
- Loossemble
- Lun8
- Mave:
- N.SSign
- NCT DoJaeJung
- NCT Wish
- Nexz
- One Pact
- Plave
- Pow
- Primrose
- Riize
- Shownu X Hyungwon
- The Wind
- TIOT
- TripleS
- Xikers
- X:IN
- Xodiac
- Young Posse
- Zerobaseone

== 2024 ==
- All(H)Ours
- ARrC
- Artms
- B.D.U
- Badvillain
- Big Ocean
- Candy Shop
- Dragon Pony
- Dxmon
- Geenius
- Genblue
- Illit
- Izna
- Madein
- Meovv
- Mytro
- NOMAD
- Nowz
- Rescene
- Say My Name
- TWS
- Unis
- VVUP
- Waker
- Waterfire

== 2025 ==
- 1Verse
- Ablume
- AHOF
- AllDay Project
- Am8ic
- AtHeart
- AxMxP
- Baby Dont Cry
- Close Your Eyes
- Cortis
- Hearts2Hearts
- Hitgs
- Hoshi X Woozi
- Idid
- Idntt
- Ifeye
- KickFlip
- KiiiKiii
- Kiiras
- Newbeat
- Nouera
- S.Coups X Mingyu
- UAU
- VVS
- Xlov

== 2026 ==
- A2O Lite
- AEN
- Alpha Drive One
- And2ble
- Daily:Direction
- DK X Seungkwan
- Dodree
- Flare U
- Hiipe Princess
- Keyveatz
- Latency
- Lngshot
- Modyssey
- NCT JNJM
- Ourbirthday
- OWIS
- Tuide
- Unchild
- WAYF Boys
- Yuhz
- V8

== See also ==
- List of South Korean idol groups (1990s)
- List of South Korean idol groups (2000s)
- List of South Korean idol groups (2010s)
