= Love Diary =

Love Diary may refer to:

== Publications ==
- Love Diary, periodical of Charlton Comics, from 1958 to 1976
- Love Diary, periodical of Orbit Publications, from 1949 to 1955
- Love Diary, periodical of Quality Comics, from 1937 to 1956

== Music ==
- Love Diary (Jinny Ng EP), 2010
- Love Diary (C-REAL EP), 2012
- Love Diaries, a 2010 album by Janice Vidal
- "Love Diary", song in Japanese anime Combustible Campus Guardress
