= Lee Seung-gi discography =

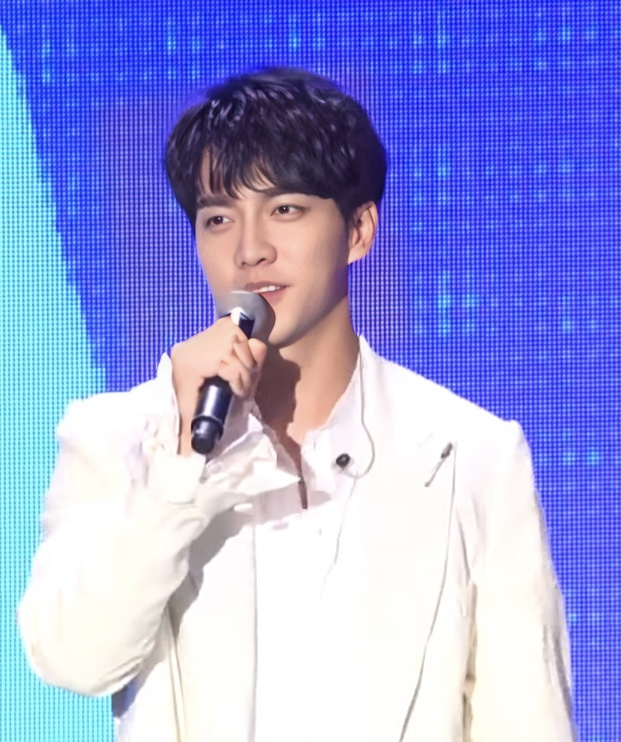
- Lee at the 2019 Taiwan Fanmeet
- Studio albums: 7
- EPs: 1
- Soundtrack albums: 3
- Live albums: 2
- Compilation albums: 1
- Singles: 21
- Music videos: 23
- Cover Albums: 2

Lee Seung-gi (born January 13, 1987) is a South Korean singer, actor, host and entertainer. His discography consists of seven Korean albums, one Japanese album, two album covers, one extended play and thirteen singles.

== Studio albums ==
Title	Album details	Peak chart positions			Sales
Title	Album details	KOR RIAK (Note: The Recording Industry Association of Korea monthly album chart was discontinued in 2008.)	KOR Gaon (Note: The Gaon Music Chart was established in 2010.)	JPN	Sales
Korean
The Dream of a Moth (나방의 꿈)	Released: June 25, 2004; Label: Hook Entertainment; Format: CD, cassette; Track listing: 1. 시작 (Start); 2. 나방의 꿈 (The Dream of a Moth); 3. 아무도 (Nobody) (feat. Kang Jin-woo); 4. 내 여자라니까 (Because You're My Woman); 5. 아버지 (Father) (feat. Psy); 6. 삭제 (Delete); 7. 여행 가는 길 (On The Road To Vacation); 8. 내안의 그대 (You Inside Me); 9. 음악시간 (Music Time); 10. J에게 (Dear J); 11. Anding; 12. 앵콜 (Encore)	19	7	—	KOR: 37,933+
Crazy for You	Released: February 2, 2006; Label: Hook Entertainment; Format: CD, cassette; Track listing: 1. 하기 힘든 말 (Words That Are Hard To Say); 2. 외쳐본다 (I'll Cry It Out); 3. 입모양 (Shape of Your Lips); 4. 그래서 어쩌라고 (So What Should I Do); 5. 가면 (Mask); 6. 그럴까봐 (I'm Afraid It Will Happen); 7. 한번만 (Just One Time); 8. Paradise; 9. Crazy For You (feat. Red Blood Cell Tommy); 10. Beautiful Girl; 11. 사랑을 지우다 (Erase Love); 12. 첫키스 (First Kiss); 13. 오늘 같은 밤 (A Night Like Tonight)	5	8	—	KOR: 33,220+
Story of Separation (이별 이야기)	Released: August 16, 2007; Repackaged: November 14, 2007; Label: Hook Entertainment; Format: CD; Track listing: 1. 아직 못 다한 이야기 (Unfinished Story) (Repackaged ver.); 2. 착한 거짓말 (White Lie); 3. 투정 (Grumble); 4. 왜...가니 (Why...Are You Leaving); 5. 그랬나요 (Was It So); 6. 미치도록 (Crazily); 7. 미안해하지 마요 (Don't Be Sorry); 8. 잘못 (Fault); 9. 온도 (Temperature); 10. 해피엔딩 (Happy Ending); 11. Smile Boy; 12. 착한 거짓말 (White Lie) (Piano ver.)	3	18	—	KOR: 18,383+
Shadow	Released: September 17, 2009; Repackaged: January 19, 2010; Label: Hook Entertainment; Format: CD, digital download; Track listing: 1. 꽃처럼 (Like A Flower); 2. 면사포 (Wedding Veil); 3. 우리 헤어지자 (Let's Break Up); 4. Melody; 5. 사랑이 맴돈다 (Love Spinning Round); 6. 사랑이란 (Love Is); 7. 그렇게 알게 됐어 (I Got To Know It That Way); 8. 널 원해 (Want You); 9. 단념 (Despair); 10. 오래오래오 (Long, Long Time) (feat. AMEN); 11. 사랑이 술을 가르쳐 (Love Taught Me To Drink) (feat. Baek Chan from 8Eight) (Repackaged ver.); 12. 처음처럼 그때처럼 (Like The Beginning, Just Like Then) (feat. Kang Min-kyung from Davichi) (Repackaged ver.)	—N/a	4	—	KOR: 45,268+
Tonight	Released: October 27, 2011; Label: Hook Entertainment; Format: CD, digital download; Track listing: 1. 친구잖아 (Aren't We Friends); 2. Tonight; 3. 어디라도 (Wherever); 4. 연애시대 (Time for Love) (feat. Ra.D, Han Hyo-joo); 5. 널 웃게 할 노래 (A Song that Will Make You Smile) (feat. Hareem, BTS); 6. 그냥 너야 (Just You); 7. 나는 나쁜 남자다 (I Am a Bad Guy); 8. Slave (feat. Pdogg); 9. 친구잖아 (Aren't We Friends) (Rock ver.); 10. 어디라도 (Wherever) (Ra.D mix ver.)	—N/a	2	—	KOR: 63,320+
And... (그리고...)	Released: June 10, 2015; Label: Hook Entertainment; Format: CD, digital download; Track listing: 1. 바람 (Breeze); 2. 그리고 안녕 (And Goodbye); 3. 사랑 (Love); 4. ~하니? (Do You?); 5. 그대와 나 (You And Me); 6. 친구 (Friend); 7. 배낭을 메고 (Carrying A Backpack); 8. 우리 함께한 그 모든 시간 (All The Time We Spend Together)	—N/a	3	—	KOR: 18,828+
The Project	Released: December 10, 2020; Label: Hook Entertainment; Format: CD, digital download; Track listing: 1. 뻔한남자 (The Ordinary Man); 2. 사랑 (Love); 3. 꽃처럼 (Like a Flower); 4. 너의 눈, 너의 손, 너의 입술 (Your Eyes, Hands and Lips); 5. 잘할게 (I Will); 6. 소년, 길을 걷다 (The Dreamers Dream); 7. 널 웃게 할 노래 (A Song to Make You Smile) (feat. RM, J-Hope); 8. 사랑이 맴돈다 (Love Spinning Round); 9. 사랑한다는 말 (Words That Say I Love You)	—N/a	9	—	KOR: 22,194
Japanese
Tonight (Japan Special Edition)	Released: April 18, 2012; Label: Universal Music; Format: CD, digital download	—	—	95	
"—" denotes album did not chart or was not released in that region.

== Cover albums ==
Title	Album details	Peak chart positions		Sales
Title	Album details	KOR RIAK	KOR Gaon	Sales
When a Man Loves a Woman (남자가 여자를 사랑할 때)	Released: September 12, 2006; Label: Hook Entertainment; Format: CD; Track listing: 1. 제발 (Please); 2. 원하고 원망하죠 (Desire and Hope); 3. 내안의 그대 (You Inside Me); 4. 사랑했잖아 (We Were in Love); 5. 한번만 더 (One More Time); 6. 아디오 (Addio); 7. 고백 (Confession); 8. 눈물 (Tears); 9. 나만의 것 (My Possession); 10. 만남 (Encounter); 11. 원하고 원망하죠 (Desire and Hope) (Acoustic ver.)	7	11	KOR: 44,209
When a Man Loves a Woman Vol.2 (남자가 여자를 사랑할 때 Vol.2)	Released: March 24, 2008; Label: Hook Entertainment; Format: CD; Track listing: 1. 다 줄꺼야 (I'll Give You All); 2. 이별의 그늘 (Shadow of Separation); 3. 미련한 사랑 (Foolish Love); 4. 나를 슬프게 하는 사람들 (People Who Make Me Sad); 5. 동경 (Yearning); 6. 추억속의 그대 (You in My Memories); 7. 잘가요 (Farewell); 8. 하나의 사랑 (One Love); 9. 긴 하루 (Long Day); 10. 너의 뒤에서 (Behind You); 11. 암연 (Dejected); 12. 너의 곁으로 (To Your Side)	6	10	KOR: 44,526

== Live and compilation albums ==
Title	Album details	Peak chart positions			Sales
Title	Album details	KOR	JPN	JPN DVD	Sales
Love: The 1st Concert	Released: April 6, 2007; Label: Hook Entertainment; Format: Digital download	—	—	—	
Hope Concert in Seoul 2010	Released: October 28, 2011 (JPN), December 19, 2011 (KOR); Label: SBS Production; Format: DVD	— (Note: The Gaon Music Chart does not track DVD sales.)	—	38	
The Best	Released: April 18, 2012; Label: Hook Entertainment (KOR), Universal Music (JPN); Format: CD, digital download	8	20	—	KOR: 7,587
"—" denotes album did not chart or was not released in that region.

== Extended plays ==
Title	EP details	Peak chart positions	Sales
Title	EP details	KOR	Sales
Forest (숲)	Released: November 22, 2012; Label: Hook Entertainment; Format: CD, digital download	3	KOR: 23,414
With	Released: December 4, 2024; Label: BPM Entertainment; Format: CD, digital download, streaming	45	KOR: 1,500

== Singles ==
Title	Year	Peak chart positions		Sales	Album
Title	Year	KOR Gaon	KOR Hot	Sales	Album
"Because You're My Woman" (내 여자라니까)	2004	—N/a	—N/a		The Dream of a Moth
"Confession" (고해)	2004	—N/a	—N/a		Non-album single
"Words That Are Hard to Say" (하기 힘든 말)	2006	—N/a	—N/a		Crazy For You
"Desire and Resent" (원하고 원망하죠)	2006	—N/a	—N/a		When a Man Loves a Woman
"White Lie" (착한 거짓말)	2007	—N/a	—N/a		Story of Separation
"Unfinished Story" (아직 못다한 이야기)	2007	—N/a	—N/a		Story of Separation
"Girl in My Memories" (추억속의 그대)	2008	—N/a	—N/a		When a Man Loves a Woman Vol.2
"Let's Go On a Vacation" (여행을 떠나요)	2008	—N/a	—N/a		Non-album singles
"Will You Marry Me" (결혼해 줄래) feat. Bizniz	2009	—N/a	—N/a		Non-album singles
"Let's Break Up" (우리 헤어지자)	2009	—N/a	—N/a		Shadow
"Love Taught Me to Drink" (사랑이 술을 가르쳐) feat. Baek Chan of 8Eight	2009	5	—N/a	KOR: 2,598,332	Shadow
"Smile Boy" (Rock ver.) with Kim Yuna	2010	14	—N/a		Non-album singles
"Smile Boy 2010"	2010	75	—N/a		Non-album singles
"Time for Love" (연애시대) feat Ra.D, Han Hyo-joo	2011	2	1	KOR: 2,278,798	Tonight
"Friends" (친구잖아)	2011	6	4	KOR: 2,082,479	Tonight
"Return" (되돌리다)	2012	1	1	KOR: 2,500,641	Forest
"And Goodbye" (그리고 안녕)	2015	4	—N/a	KOR: 464,757	And...
"I'm Going to the Military" (나 군대 간다)	2016	7	—N/a	KOR: 232,124	Non-album singles
"Meet Someone Like Me" (그런 사람)	2016	51	—N/a	KOR: 55,950	Non-album singles
"The Ordinary Man" (뻔한남자)	2020	6	15		The Project
"I Will" (잘할게)	2020	44	26		The Project
"Empty" (정리)	2025	TBA			Non-album single

== Soundtrack appearances ==
Title	Year	Peak chart positions		Sales	Album
Title	Year	KOR Gaon	KOR Hot	Sales	Album
"Losing My Mind" (정신이 나갔었나봐)	2010	5	—N/a	KOR: 1,691,372	My Girlfriend Is a Gumiho OST
"From Now on I Love You" (지금부터 사랑해)	2010	4	—N/a	KOR: 1,304,059	My Girlfriend Is a Gumiho OST
"Last Word" (마지막 그 한마디)	2013	5	6	KOR: 466,074	Gu Family Book OST

== Other charted songs ==
Title	Year	Peak chart positions		Sales	Album
Title	Year	KOR Gaon	KOR Hot	Sales	Album
"Like the Beginning, Just Like Then" (처음처럼 그때처럼) (feat. Kang Min-kyung)	2009	2	—N/a	KOR: 1,332,494	Shadow
"Tonight"	2011	44	40	KOR: 365,202	Tonight
"Wherever" (어디라도)	2011	64	56	KOR: 221,506	Tonight
"A Song to Make You Smile" (널 웃게 할 노래) (feat. Hareem, BTS)	2011	36	27	KOR: 329,031	Tonight
"Just You" (그냥 너야)	2011	69	71	KOR: 213,685	Tonight
"I Am a Bad Guy" (나는 나쁜 남자다)	2011	75	69	KOR: 201,824	Tonight
"Slave" (feat. Pdogg)	2011	95	—	KOR: 122,580	Tonight
"Forest" (숲)	2012	12	—N/a	KOR: 654,035	Forest
"Words That Say I Love You" (사랑한다는 말)	2012	14	—N/a	KOR: 587,285	Forest
"Invitation to Me" (나에게 초대)	2012	29	—N/a	KOR: 343,664	Forest
"Wind" (바람)	2015	46	—N/a		And...
"Love" (사랑)	2015	50	—N/a		And...
"Do I?" (~하니?)	2015	92	—N/a		And...
"You and Me" (그대와 나)	2015	93	—N/a		And...
"All the Time We Spend Together" (우리 함께한 그 모든 시간)	2015	96	—N/a		And...

== Music videos ==
Year	Title	Starring	Featuring clip
2004	Because You're My Girl (내 여자라니까)	Kim Sa-rang	
2004	Delete (삭제)		
2006	Words That Are Hard to Say (하기 힘든 말)	Nam Sang-mi	
2006	Shape of Your Lips (입모양)		
2006	Please (제발)	Park Min-ji	
2006	Desire and Hope (원하고 원망하죠)	Park Min-ji	
2006	Addio (아디오)	Park Min-ji	
2006	Tears (눈물)	Park Min-ji	
2007	White Lie (착한 거짓말)	Wang Ji-hye	
2007	Why... Are You Leaving (왜...가니)	Wang Ji-hye	
2008	I'll Give You All (다 줄꺼야)		
2008	Let's Go on a Vacation (여행을 떠나요)		1 Night 2 Days
2009	Let's Break Up (우리 헤어지자)	Lee Se-na	
2010	Smile Boy (Rock ver.)	Yuna Kim	
2010	Losing My Mind (정신이 나갔었나봐)		My Girlfriend Is a Nine-Tailed Fox
2010	From Now on I Love You (지금부터 사랑해)		My Girlfriend Is a Nine-Tailed Fox
2011	Aren't We Friends (친구잖아)		
2012	Time for Love (恋愛時代)	Park Shin-hye	
2012	Aren't We Friends (チングジャナ -友達だから-)	Park Shin-hye, Joo Sang-wook	
2012	Return (되돌리다)	Park Gun-tae, Kim Yoo-jung	
2012	An Invitation for Me (나에게 초대)		
2012	Forest (숲)		
2013	Last Word (마지막 그 한마디)		Gu Family Book
2015	And Goodbye (그리고 안녕)		
2016	Meet Someone Like Me (그런 사람)		
2020	The Ordinary Man (뻔한남자)		
2020	I Will (잘할게)	Park Gyu-young	
2023	Our Vacation		Bro & Marble
2023	Well Done, Guys! (수고했어요, 우리)		Bro & Marble
