= One 4 U =

2012 single by A-Jax

Single by A-Jax

from the album 2MYX
- B-side: "Never Let Go"
- Released: June 1, 2012
- Recorded: 2012
- Genre: K-pop, Rock
- Length: 3:57
- Label: DSP Media
- Songwriter: Steven Lee
- Producer: Steven Lee

A-Jax Korean singles chronology
"One 4 U" (2012)	"Hot Game" (2012)

Music video
- "One 4 U" on YouTube

"One 4 U" (Japanese: ワン・フォー・ユー Wan Fō Yū; Korean: 원포유 Wonpoyu) is a song by South Korean boy band A-Jax. It was released on June 1, 2012 as the group's debut single. The song "Never Let Go", used as B-side for the Korean single, was released on May 15, 2012, two weeks before their official debut, as a prologue single. The song was re-recorded in Japanese and will also serve as their debut single in Japan. It was released on August 8, 2012.

== Background ==
On May 7, a mysterious video featuring Kara's member Goo Hara was revealed on DSP Media's YouTube account with a male voice on the background. The video created a confusion because it was not revealed if the video was a teaser for an upcoming Korean comeback of Kara, or a teaser for an upcoming solo event of Hara, or something related to A-Jax. On May 10, another video of Hara was released, revealing that the teaser was related to A-Jax. In the teaser, a song of the group (at this time the name was not revealed) was playing at the background. On May 15, DSP Media released the song and music video of the song played on the teaser, called "Never Let Go". On the music video only appears Hara. Later it was stated that the song was only a prologue song. On May 21, it was revealed that A-Jax was set to be the opening act in Kara's last two shows of their first tour, Karasia, in Saitama, Japan. The members stated "It's an honor to be able to stand on such a big stage before our debut. It'll be a learning experience for us. As it is a great opportunity, we're going to work to show as much of our charm as possible." On May 1, it was revealed that the group will be debuting in South Korea and Japan simultaneously in 2012. It was also revealed by DSP that "A-Jax will be the first Korean idol group to debut within Korea and Japan simultaneously, and will follow in the footsteps of the group SS501. A-Jax has signed under the equivalent conditions that other Korean male idol groups, who have already established their popularity, have been given, making it an unprecedented event. Thus, they are receiving much attention from Japanese music industry insiders." For their Japanese releases, they signed with the label Universal Sigma, where their labelmates Kara and Rainbow are currently signed.

On May 28, DSP Media released, on A-Jax's YouTube account, a teaser of the music video for their official debut song "One 4 U". The full single of "One 4 U" were released on June 1. The song is also known for being the opening and ending theme song of MBC Music's reality show Making the Star - DSP Boyz.

== Composition ==
"One 4 U" and "Never Let Go" were written and produced by the multi-platinum Korean-American music producer, songwriter, and multi-instrumentalist Steven Lee. He also produced the song "So Cool" and made additional engineering on the song "To Me", of their labelmate Rainbow. He also produced songs of the group SS501 and its members Heo Young-saeng and Kim Hyun-joong.

== Music video ==
=== Never Let Go ===
Two teasers of the music video for "Never Let Go" were released, the first being released on May 7 and the second being released on May 10, all on DSP Media's YouTube account. The full music video was released on May 15, on A-Jax's YouTube account, along with the release of the song digitally. The music video is starred by Kara's member Goo Hara and A-Jax's members does not appears.

=== One 4 U ===
A teaser of the music video for "One 4 U" was released on May 29, on A-Jax's YouTube account. The full music video was released on June 1, along with the single release. It was later stated that the music video have cost $42,500 USD only with Computer graphics effects.

== Promotions ==
The Korean promotions of the song "One 4 U" started on June 2, on MBC's Show! Music Core. The group is also promoting on the shows Inkigayo, M! Countdown and Show Champion. The song "Never Let Go" was used for the debut week performances. Due to a problem with the choreography, the group decided to change it on its second week of promotions. The choreography, called 'back down' dance, is falling on your back from an upright position while keeping your body straight without any safety devices. This part of the choreography was hurting the members' back. The promotions of the song ended on July 1 and will be followed by "Hot Game".

== Track listing ==
All tracks are written by Steven Lee.

Korean single
No.	Title	Length
1.	"One 4 U" (원포유; Wonpoyu)	3:57
2.	"Never Let Go" (너밖에 몰라서; Neobakke Mollaseo)	4:31
3.	"One 4 U" (Instrumental)	3:57
4.	"Never Let Go" (Instrumental)	4:31
Total length:		16:54

== Chart performance ==
"Never Let Go" debuted at position number 164 on Gaon Chart, in the week of May 25, with 1,441,047 points. "One 4 U" debuted at position number 167, in the week of June 7, with 1,173,982 points.

=== Never Let Go ===
Chart	Peak position
Gaon Weekly singles chart	164
Gaon Weekly Domestic singles chart	155

=== One 4 U ===
Chart	Peak position
Gaon Weekly singles chart	167
Gaon Weekly Domestic singles chart	152

== Japanese version ==
"One 4 U" "ワン・フォー・ユー"
- Regular edition cover

Single by A-Jax
- B-side: "Break Up"
- Released: August 8, 2012
- Recorded: 2012
- Genre: J-pop, Rock
- Length: 4:00
- Label: Universal Sigma
- Songwriter: Steven Lee
- Producer: Steven Lee

A-Jax Japanese singles chronology
"One 4 U" "ワン・フォー・ユー" (2012)	"Hot Game" (2012)

A Japanese version of the song was also used as the group's debut single in Japan. It was released on August 8, 2012 in five editions: CD+DVD, CD+Photobook, two CD only editions, first press with a bonus track and a standard regular edition and a Premium Box edition.

=== Background ===
On June 19, Universal Sigma announced that "One 4 U" was re-recorded in Japanese and will be released as their debut single in Japan. The single will be released on August 8, 2012 in five different editions: Premium Box, CD+DVD, CD + Photobook, CD Only + Bonus track and a Regular edition. The bonus track included is a cover of the song "Crazy 4 U", originally sung by the group SS501, released on the group's fifth Korean mini album Destination. It was also announced that the group will make a Handshake event commemorating the release of the single. It will be held in Tokyo on August 8, Osaka on August 10, Nagoya on August 11 and in Fukuoka on August 12. On July 23, Universal Music announced a special Premium Box of the single, featuring all editions of the single and a special DVD with the special showcase realized on July 11, 2012 in Stellar Ball.

=== Composition ===
The Japanese version of the song, like the Korean version, was composed by Steven Lee and written by Jam-9 and Yū Shimoji. The b-side "Break Up" was written by Kenn Kato and composed by Kim Won-hyun, Shim Man-joo. The first press edition of the single include a cover of the song "Crazy 4 U", originally sung by the boyband SS501.

=== Music video ===
The Japanese version of the music video premiered on the network Space Shower TV on July 6, 2012. A short version of the music video was uploaded on Universal Music Japan's YouTube account on July 10, 2012. The music video mixes the Japanese version of "One 4 U" with some scenes of Goo Hara from the music video of "Never Let Go".

=== Track listing ===
Limited and Standard CD only edition track list
No.	Title	Lyrics	Music	Length
1.	"One 4 U" (ワン・フォー・ユー; Wan Fō Yū) (Japanese version)	Jam-9, Yu Shimoji	Steven Lee	4:00
2.	"Break Up"	Kenn Kato	Kim Won-hyun, Shim Man-joo	3:22
3.	"One 4 U" (Instrumental)		Steven Lee	3:59
4.	"Break Up" (Instrumental)		Kim Won-hyun, Shim Man-joo	3:23
Total length:				14:41

CD Only first press bonus track
No.	Title	Length
5.	"Crazy 4 U" (SS501 cover)

Premium Box DVD: A-JAX SPECIAL SHOWCASE @ Stellar Ball 2012.7.11
No.	Title	Length
1.	"One 4 U"
2.	"Never Let Go"
3.	"Hot Game"
4.	"Backstage Off-shot movie"

DVD (Limited edition Type A)
No.	Title	Length
1.	"One 4 U" (Music video - Japanese version)
2.	"One 4 U" (Photography Off-shot movie)

=== Chart performance ===
==== Oricon ====
Released	Oricon Chart	Peak	Debut Sales	Sales Total	Chart Run
August 8, 2012	Daily Singles Chart	21	4,030 (Weekly)	4,030	1 week
August 8, 2012	Weekly Singles Chart	29	4,030 (Weekly)	4,030	1 week
August 8, 2012	Monthly Singles Chart	—	—	4,030	1 week

==== Other charts ====
Chart	Peak position
Billboard Japan Hot 100	86
Billboard Japan Hot Singles sales	35

== Release history ==
Country	Date	Format	Label
South Korea	May 15, 2012 - June 1, 2012	Digital download (Never Let Go only)	DSP Media
South Korea	June 1, 2012	Digital download (Korean single)	DSP Media
Worldwide	June 1, 2012	Digital download (Korean single)	DSP Media
Japan	August 1, 2012	Digital download (One 4 U only)	Universal Sigma
Japan	August 8, 2012	CD single, Digital download (Full Japanese single)	Universal Sigma
