= Sunny Blues =

- Digital cover for Part A

Studio album by Sunny Hill
- Released: August 21, 2014 (Part A); January 29, 2015 (Part B)
- Recorded: 2014
- Genres: K-pop, dance-pop
- Label: LOEN Entertainment

Sunny Hill chronology
Young Folk (2013)	Sunny Blues (2014)	Way (2016)

Digital cover for Part B

Singles from Sunny Blues
- 1. "Once In A Summer" Released: August 1, 2014; 2. "Monday Blues" Released: August 21, 2014; 3. "Child In Time" Released: January 28, 2015

Sunny Blues is the first studio album of the South Korean girl group Sunny Hill. It was released in two parts with Part A being released on August 21, 2014 and Part B released on January 29, 2015.

== Background ==
A teaser image was released on August 11, featuring the members (without their heads). On August 12, teaser images for Seungah and Kota were released. On August 13, teaser images for Misung and Jubi were released. On August 15, teaser images for the group and members were released alongside a medley of the album songs. On August 18, teaser video for "Monday Blues" was released. On August 21, full MV and Part A of the album were released.

== Music video ==
The music video has a "secretary concept" with the message of "freedom at work".

== Promotions ==
The promotions for the album started on August 21.

== Track listing ==
Part A
No.	Title	Lyrics	Music	Arrangement	Length
1.	"선수입장 (Player)"	Kim Eana	Electronic Man, KZ	Electronic Man, KZ	3:41
2.	"Monday Blues"	Kim Eana	Lee Minsu	Lee Minsu	3:14
3.	"Get the x out"	TEXU	TEXU	TEXU	3:16
4.	"연애세포 (Love Cell)"	Misung	Kim Min, Electronic Man	Electronic Man	3:46
5.	"Paradise (ft. JeA of Brown Eyed Girls)"	Kim Sujeong	JeA, Song Gihong	Song Gihong	3:33
6.	"그 해 여름 (Once in Summer)"	KZ	KZ, Gomdolgun	KZ, Gomdolgun	4:01
7.	"Monday Blues (Instrumental)"		Lee Minsu	Lee Minsu	3:14
8.	"그 해 여름 (Instrumental)"		KZ	KZ, Gomdolgun	4:01
Total length:					28:39

Part B
No.	Title	Length
1.	"겨울의 끝 (The End of Winter)(Intro)"	0:47
2.	"Better Woman"	3:26
3.	"교복을 벗고 (Child in Time)"	4:14
4.	"King & Queen"	3:40
5.	"현재 연애 중 (I'm in Love)"	4:20
6.	"그대 찬양 (Praise for You)"	3:07
7.	"Tears on My Lips (JuB Solo)"	3:45
8.	"지우다 (Here I Am) (Sensibility ver)."	3:20
9.	"교복을 벗고 (Child in Time) (Instrumental)"	4:14
Total length:		30:58

== Charts ==
=== Single chart ===
Song	Peak chart position
Song	KOR
Song	Gaon Chart
"Once In A Summer"	47
"Monday Blues"	96

== Release history ==
Country	Date	Format	Distributing label
South Korea	August 21, 2014 (Part A)	CD, digital download	Loen Entertainment
Worldwide	August 21, 2014 (Part A)	Digital download	Loen Entertainment
South Korea	January 29, 2015 (Part B)	CD, digital download	Loen Entertainment
Worldwide	January 29, 2015 (Part B)	Digital download	Loen Entertainment
