= Hot Game (song) =

2012 single by A-Jax

Single by A-Jax

from the album 2MYX
- Released: July 11, 2012
- Recorded: 2012
- Genre: K-pop; dance-pop
- Length: 3:13
- Label: DSP Media
- Composers: Steven Lee; Lasse Lindorff
- Lyricist: Kim Ji-hyang
- Producer: Steven Lee

A-Jax Korean singles chronology
"One 4 U" (2012)	"Hot Game" (2012)	"2MYX" (2012)

Music video
- "Hot Game" on YouTube

"Hot Game" (핫게임 Hat Geim; ホット ゲーム Hotto Gēmu) is a song by South Korean boy band A-Jax. It was released on July 11, 2012, as the group's second single. On August 9, Universal Sigma announced that the song was re-recorded in Japanese and would be released as the group's second Japanese single, on October 31, 2012.

== Background ==
After the promotions of the single "One 4 U", DSP Media, group's label, started an event called "Wing Car Project", to the group meet their fans outside Seoul. A special truck was used to the group travel for the cities. The cities stated are Daegu on July 7, Busan on July 8 and Daejeon on July 9. In that same statement, it was also announced that the group will be releasing a new digital single in July. One day later, it was revealed a photo of the truck's back, revealing the name of the new single, titled "Hot Game". The song was first performed in Daegu's event. DSP Media also informed that the song will be promoted as "One 4 U" follow-up song.

=== Japanese version ===
"Hot Game" "ホット ゲーム"

Single by A-Jax
- B-side: "Dreamin' Hunter"
- Released: October 31, 2012
- Recorded: 2012
- Genre: J-pop; dance-pop
- Label: Universal Sigma
- Composers: Steven Lee; Lasse Lindorff
- Lyricist: Kim Ji-hyang

A-Jax Japanese singles chronology
"One 4 U" (2012)	"Hot Game" "ホット ゲーム" (2012)	"Romeo" (2017)

On August 9, Universal Sigma and DSP Media announced that a Japanese re-recorded version of the song will serve as the group's second single. On September 28, Sigma updated the news with more details of the single, jacket covers and track listing. The single will be released in four editions: a CD+DVD, including the CD single and a DVD including the song's music video and a special off-shot video, a CD+Photobook edition, including the CD and a special photobook and two Regular editions: first press, with a cover of the song "A Song Calling Your Name", originally sung by SS501, as bonus track and a normal edition, including only the CD single with the normal track list.

== Composition ==
The song was written by Kim Ji-hyang, also known for writing songs for the groups U-KISS, Girl's Day, for the artist Lee Hyori and more. It was composed by Steven Lee, same composed of the songs "One 4 U" and "Never Let Go", released by the group.

== Music video ==
=== Korean version ===
The music video of the song was released simultaneously with the digital release of the song, on July 11. The music video features Kara's member Nicole Jung.

== Promotions ==
The promotions of the song on TV music shows will start on July 12, on Mnet's M! Countdown. The song is also being promoted on the shows Music Core, Inkigayo, Show Champion and Music Bank.

== Track listing ==
All lyrics are written by Kim Ji-hyang; all music is composed by Steven Lee and Lasse Lindorff.

Korean single
No.	Title	Length
1.	"Hot Game" (핫게임; Hat Geim)	3:13
2.	"Hot Game" (instrumental)	3:13
Total length:		6:26

Japanese single – limited and standard CD only edition track list
No.	Title	Length
1.	"Hot Game" (ホット ゲーム; Hotto Gēmu; Japanese version)
2.	"Dreamin' Hunter"
3.	"Hot Game" (instrumental)
4.	"Dreamin' Hunter" (instrumental)

Japanese single – CD Only first press bonus track
No.	Title	Length
5.	"A Song Calling Your Name" (널 부르는 노래; Neol Bureuneun Norae) (SS501 cover)

DVD (limited edition type A)
No.	Title	Length
1.	"Hot Game" (Music video – Japanese version)
2.	"Hot Game" (Music video – Off-shot movie)

== Chart performance ==
=== Korean version ===
The song debuted at number 59 on Gaon's Weekly singles chart, in the week of July 19, with 5.075.196 points. The song also charted in Gaon's Streaming and Download chart, in number 143 with 162.302 streams and in number 99 with 31.610 downloads, respectively.

Chart	Peak position
Gaon Weekly singles chart	59
Gaon Weekly Domestic singles chart	58
Gaon Weekly Streaming chart	143
Gaon Weekly Download chart	99

=== Japanese version ===
==== Oricon ====
Released	Oricon Chart	Peak	Debut Sales	Sales Total	Chart Run
October 31, 2012	Daily Singles Chart	19	3,692 (Weekly)	3,692+	1 week
October 31, 2012	Weekly Singles Chart	31	3,692 (Weekly)	3,692+	1 week
October 31, 2012	Monthly Singles Chart	—	3,692 (Weekly)	3,692+	1 week

== Release history ==
Country	Date	Format	Label
South Korea	July 11, 2012	Digital download	DSP Media; CJ E&M
Worldwide	July 11, 2012	Digital download	DSP Media; CJ E&M
Japan	October 31, 2012	CD single, Digital download	Universal Sigma
