= Forest (Lee Seung-gi EP) =

EP by Lee Seung-gi
- Released: 22 November 2012
- Genre: K-pop, ballad
- Length: 17:12
- Language: Korean
- Label: Hook Entertainment
- Producer: Epitone Project

Lee Seung-gi chronology
Tonight (2011)	Forest (2012)	And...(그리고...) (2015)

Singles from Forest
- 1. "Return (되돌리다)" Released: 22 November 2012

Forest (Korean: 숲; RR: Sup) is the first extended play by South Korean singer-actor Lee Seung-gi. It was released on 22 November 2012 by Hook Entertainment. The album was produced by Epitone Project (real name: Cha Se-jung) and contains five songs, including the single, "Return".

The album peaked at number three on the Gaon Album Chart, and sold over 23,000 copies by the end of 2012. "Return" topped the Gaon Digital Chart for three consecutive weeks and was the first song to spend six weeks in the number one spot on Billboard's K-pop Hot 100 chart.

== Track listing ==
No.	Title	Lyrics	Music	Length
1.	"Intro"	–	Cha Se-jung	0:55
2.	"Return" (되돌리다; Doedollida)	Cha Se-jung	Cha Se-jung	4:26
3.	"Forest" (숲; Sup)	Cha Se-jung	Cha Se-jung	3:54
4.	"Words of Love" (사랑한다는 말; Saranghandaneun Mal)	Lee Seung-gi	Cha Se-jung	3:48
5.	"Invite" (나에게 초대; Naege Chodae)	Cha Se-jung	Cha Se-jung	4:14
Total length:				17:12

== Charts ==
=== Weekly charts ===
Chart (2012)	Peak position
South Korean Albums (Gaon)	3

=== Year-end charts ===
Chart (2012)	Position
South Korean Albums (Gaon)	72

== See also ==
- Lee Seung-gi discography
