= The Grasshoppers (song) =

Single by Sunny Hill
- A-side: "The Grasshoppers Song"
- Released: January 13, 2012
- Recorded: 2011
- Genre: K-pop, dance-pop
- Length: 11:28
- Label: LOEN Entertainment
- Songwriter: Kim Eana

Sunny Hill singles chronology
"Pray" (2011)	"The Grasshoppers" (2012)	"Is the White Horse Coming?" (2012)

The Grasshoppers is the third maxi single of South Korean group Sunny Hill. It was released on January 12, 2012, with "The Grasshoppers Song" as the A-side and promotional track. The single was the last by band member Janghyun, before his leaving to serve in the South Korean military service for 2 years. On his return from the military Janghyun left the group to concentrate on producing.

== Background ==
A teaser image of the entire group together was revealed on January 5. Another teaser photo was revealed on January 10 with more details about the title track. The photo revealed is a cut from the music video of "The Grasshopper Song", song which was produced by Lee Min Soo and Kim Eana, same producers of IU's "Good Day" and "You and I", and a photo featuring solo shots from the 5 members. A representative of the group's agency, LOEN Entertainment, stated: "As the title track was motivated from a children’s story, it has a fun, intriguing concept with an addictive melody that people of all ages could enjoy. We ask for your support and anticipation." One day later, on January 11, LOEN Entertainment released a teaser video featuring Brown Eyed Girls' member Narsha.

On January 20, in the middle of promotions of "The Grasshopers Song" on TV music shows, Jang Hyun, leader of the group, decided to enlist on military services during 2 years. LOEN Entertainment stated: "Sunny Hill’s male member, Jang Hyun, will be entering into active duty in the military on January 31st after having received his draft notice on January 6th. Although he could have announced his enlistment earlier, he wanted to be fully committed to their latest album, which is why we are releasing this information now. We apologize to all the fans and all those concerned.".

== Music video ==
On January 10, a 2-minute teaser of the music video was released, featuring Brown Eyed Girls' Narsha. The music video of "The Grasshoppers Song" was released on January 13, along with the single release. It was revealed that the music video is inspired by the fable "The Ant and the Grasshopper", of Aesop.

== Promotion ==
The promotions of the song "The Grasshoppers Song" started on January 13, on same day of the release, on KBS's show Music Bank. The group also performed on the shows Music Core, Inkigayo and M! Countdown. On January 21, on the show Music Core, was the last performance of the group with the member Jang Hyun, which temporarily departed from the group to serve military service. The other four girls of the group stayed performing the song. Starting on January 26, Jang Hyun lines on the song were sung by some special guests:

- January 26: Led Apple's Han Byul (M! Countdown)
- January 27: Huh Kyung Hwan (Music Bank)
- January 28: MBLAQ's Thunder (Music Core)
- January 29: IU (Inkigayo)
- February 2: Block B's Zico (M! Countdown)
- February 3: Kim Jae Wook (Music Bank)
- February 4: Teen Top's Chunji (Music Core)
- February 5: 8Eight's Lee Hyun (Inkigayo)
- February 9: Block B's Zico (M! Countdown)
- February 10: Teen Top's Niel (Music Bank)
- February 12: MBLAQ's G.O (Inkigayo)
- February 16: Brown Eyed Girls' Miryo (M! Countdown)

In its final week of promotions, the group performed without guests. The promotions ended on February 26, on SBS's Inkigayo.

== Track listing ==
Official track listing
No.	Title	Lyrics	Music	Arrangement	Length
1.	"Bad Guy" (나쁜 남자; Nappeun Namja)	Misung, Kota	Misung, Kota, JunJAMan	JunJAMan	4:02
2.	"Hide and Seek" (술래잡기; Sullaejapgi)	Kim Eana	Lee Min-Soo	Lee Min-Soo	3:32
3.	"The Grasshoppers Song" (베짱이 찬가; Bejjangi Changa)	Kim Eana	Lee Min-Soo	Lee Min-Soo	3:56
Total length:					11:28

== Charts ==
=== Album ===
Chart (2012)	Peak position
Gaon Weekly albums chart	2
Gaon Monthly albums chart	9

=== Singles ===
Song	Peak chart position	
Song	KOR	US
Song	Gaon Chart	K-Pop Billboard
"The Grasshopper Song"	4	9
"Bad Boy"	170	—

=== Sales ===
Chart	Sales
Gaon physical sales	10,000+ (South Korea only)
Gaon digital sales	2,201,725+ (The Grasshoppers)

== Release history ==
Country	Date	Distributing label	Format
South Korea	January 13, 2012	LOEN Entertainment	CD, Digital download
Worldwide	January 13, 2012	LOEN Entertainment	Digital download
