= F-iV =

South Korean boy band

- F-iV in 2016; L-R: Seo Ji-won, Chang Hae-young, Kim Hyun-soo, Woo Jung-tae

Background information
- Origin: South Korea
- Genres: K-pop; R&B; Ballad
- Years active: 2002–2004, 2012, 2016
- Labels: EnterOne, CS Entertainment(former), Waltz Music(former), H&J Entertainment(current)
- Past members: Seo Ji-Won; Kim Hyun-Soo; Chang Hae-Young; Woo Jung-Tae

F-iV (Korean: 파이브; RR: pai-beu; also stylized as F-IV) was a four-member South Korean boy band composed of Seo Ji-won, Chang Hae-young, Woo Jung-tae, and Kim Hyun-soo. Formed in 1999, the group debuted in 2002 and became a popular boy band in the early 2000s in South Korea. During their career, the group released two albums and one EP.

== Etymology ==
Although F-iV consists of four members, the group's name is pronounced like the word five in English. According to the group, the reason is that the F in the group's name stands for fan, where the group's fans are considered the fifth member of their group. Moreover, the group states that the iV in the group's name is supposed to be like the Roman numerals IV, which is equivalent to the number 4 like the number of members in the group.

== Career ==
=== 1999-2001: Pre-debut Years ===
The four members of F-iV were first formed as a group by their label in 1999 due to the rise in popularity of R&B music from groups such as Fly to the Sky and Brown Eyes, and were recruited for their music talents such as composition and arrangement. The group spent three years training in preparation for their eventual debut.

=== 2002-2004: Active Years ===
On September 25, 2002, F-iV released their debut album F-iV [Faiv] under CS Entertainment, which featured songs with R&B and ballad elements. However, they underwent label issues shortly after their debut; about a month later, the group moved to a new label, Waltz Music, and re-released their first album (with a new album cover and an altered tracklist).

F-iV [Faiv] gained attention due to the fact that member Kim Hyun-soo produced five out of the eleven tracks. One of those tracks was the title song, "Girl", which received critical success and was nominated under the category Best New Group in 2003 at the Mnet Asian Music Awards (then called the Mnet Music Video Festival), one of the major music awards ceremonies in South Korea. The group was also chosen as one of the Best New Artists of 2003 at KMTV's Korean Music Awards along with Se7en and Big Mama.

The group followed up the success of their debut album with their sophomore album F-iV Story on March 30, 2004. Unlike their first album, in which Kim Hyun-soo participated in, F-iV Story was entirely written and composed by other professional songwriters and composers; the title song, "I'm Sorry", for example, was written and produced by Bang Si-hyuk. The album produced two more follow-up songs, "Shadow Dance" and "Merry Christmas".

The promotion of F-iV Story was met with several setbacks such as a halt in the promotion of "Shadow Dance" and the members' imminent military enlistment. Leader Seo Ji-won eventually enlisted for his service as a social service agent on November 8, 2004. Woo Jung-tae's enlistment was pushed back due to his mother's health issues; he starred in an Mnet variety show called Home Sweet Home before enlisting. Kim Hyun-soo transitioned to his original position of songwriting, later going on to write songs for other artists like Ryu Nine. Main vocalist Chang Hae-young had to promote "Merry Christmas" on his own, albeit still under F-iV's name. The group went on an indefinite hiatus until 2012.

=== 2012: Ten-Year Anniversary ===
The members of F-iV came together after a seven-year hiatus to record an EP titled Thank You on February 6, 2012. The album was released ten years after their 2002 debut album F-iV [Faiv] to commemorate their tenth anniversary as a group.

=== 2016: Public Reappearance ===
After a four-year hiatus, F-iv appeared publicly again in 2016 on South Korean television channel JTBC's Two Yoo Project Sugar Man, where they made a special appearance as guests in Episode 37 of the show's first season.

== Cover Version ==
Taiwanese pop singer Show Lo sang a Chinese Mandarin cover version of F-iV's "Girl" called "Do You Dare? (Gan Bu Gan)" in his debut 2003 album Show Time.

Taiwanese group Energy also sang a Mandarin cover of "Merry Christmas" titled "Zui Hou Yi Ci (最后一次)".

== Members ==
- Seo Ji-won (서지원)
- Kim Hyun-soo (김현수)
- Chang Hae-young (장해영)
- Woo Jung-tae (우정태)

== Discography ==
=== Albums ===
Title	Album Details	Track Listing
F-IV [faiv]	Released: September 25, 2002; Label: H&J Entertainment; Format: CD, Digital download	Track list: 1. 영상이 없습니다; 2. Alone; 3. Girl; 4. 선물; 5. 반지; 6. C'est La Vie; 7. Someone To Love; 8. 휘파람; 9. Crazy For You; 10. Beyond The Time; 11. 로망스
F-iV Story	Released: March 30, 2004; Label: H&J Entertainment; Format: CD, Digital download	Track list: 1. 알면서도; 2. Shadow Dance (Feat. 은지원); 3. I'm Sorry; 4. Merry Christmas; 5. 나야; 6. 그게 너이길; 7. 그 날 이후; 8. 우린 지금 헤어지지만... (Merry Christmas Piano Ver. - with 정태, 지원); 9. Happy Again; 10. Good Bye; 11. 한마디; 12. Shadow Dance (Acoustic Remix); 13. 원해; 14. Run Away Lover; 15. Be With You; 16. 널 바라보며 (Good Bye Piano Ver. - with 해영, 현수); 17. 알면서도 (Acoustic Remix)

=== EP ===
Title	Album Details	Track Listing
Thank You	Released: February 6, 2012; Label: H&J Entertainment; Format: CD, Digital download	Track list: 1. Thank You; 2. Ring 반지; 3. Thank You (Inst.); 4. 반지 (Inst.)

== Videography ==
=== Music videos ===
Year	Title	Album	Note
2002	Girl	F-IV [faiv]	
2002	Ring 반지	F-IV [faiv]	
2004	I'm Sorry	F-IV Story	
2012	Thank You	Thank You	

=== Variety show ===
Year	Title	Network	Note
2016	Two Yoo Project Sugar Man – Season 1	JTBC	Guest (ep.37)

== Award Nomination ==
Year	Award	Category	Recipient	Result
2003	Mnet Asian Music Awards (MAMA)	Best New Group	"Girl"	Nominated

== See also ==
- List of South Korean idol groups (2000s)
