= 2MYX =

EP by A-Jax
- Released: November 15, 2012
- Recorded: 2012
- Genre: K-pop, dance-pop
- Length: 26:03
- Label: DSP Media

A-Jax chronology
2MYX (2012)	Insane (2013)

Singles from 2MYX
- 1. "One 4 U" Released: June 1, 2012; 2. "Hot Game" Released: July 11, 2012; 3. "2MYX" Released: November 15, 2012

2MYX (an abbreviation of To My Ex) is the debut mini album from the South Korean boy band A-Jax. It was released in November 15, 2012 with the song of same name used as the promotional track. The EP also includes the singles "One 4 U" and "Hot Game".

== Background ==
On November 15, the EP and music video of "2MYX" were released at the same time. "2MYX" was described as a response to the Girls' Generation's song "Run Devil Run".

== Composition ==
The EP is composed of seven songs: three new songs, three already-released songs, and an instrumental. "2MYX" was written by Cha Yong-un and Yi Sin-seong and composed by John Lundvik, Andreas Oberg and Kalle Engstrom. "Catch Me If You Can" was written by Koh Minae and composed by Steven Lee and Jimmy Richard Drew. Steven Lee also produced the songs "Your Song", "One 4 U", and "Never Let Go" and composed "Hot Game", which was written by Kim Ji-hyang. An instrumental of "2MYX" was also included on the EP.

== Promotion ==
Promotions for the EP and "2MYX" started on November 15, on Mnet's show M! Countdown. The group also promoted on the music shows Music Bank, Music Core, Inkigayo and Show Champion.

== Track listing ==
No.	Title	Lyrics	Music	Length
1.	"2MYX"	Cha Yong-un, Yi Sin-seong (Zig Zag Note)	John Lundvik, Andreas Oberg, Kalle Engstrom	3:14
2.	"Catch Me If You Can" (잡을 테면 잡아봐; Jabeul Temyeon Jababwa)	Koh Minae	Steven Lee, Jimmy Richard Drew	3:19
3.	"Your Song" (너의 노래; Neoui Nolae)	Steven Lee	Steven Lee	4:36
4.	"One 4 U"	Steven Lee	Steven Lee	3:57
5.	"Never Let Go" (너밖에 몰라서; Neobakke Mollaseo)	Steven Lee	Steven Lee	4:30
6.	"Hot Game"	Kim Ji-hyang	Steven Lee, Jimmy Richard, Lasse Lindorff, Svend Gudiksen	3:13
7.	"2MYX" (Instrumental)		John Lundvik, Andreas Oberg, Kalle Engstrom	3:14
Total length:				26:03

== Charts ==
=== Album chart ===
Chart	Peak position
Gaon Weekly album chart	6
Gaon Monthly album chart	24

=== Singles chart ===
Song	Peak chart position	
Song	KOR	KOR
Song	Gaon Chart	K-Pop Billboard
"2MYX"	188	—
"One 4 U"	167	—
"Never Let Go"	164	—
"Hot Game"	59	—

== Release history ==
Country	Date	Format	Label
South Korea	November 15, 2012	Digital download	DSP Media CJ E&M
South Korea	November 16, 2012	CD	DSP Media CJ E&M
