= GP Basic =

South Korean girl group

- Origin: Seoul, South Korea
- Genres: Pop, dance
- Years active: 2010–2015
- Labels: Jacyhan International; Timo Entertainment
- Past members: Zion; Trinity; Amet; Mooi; Hannah; Leah; Janey

GP Basic (Korean: 지피 베이직) was a South Korean girl group who debuted on August 15, 2010. At the time of their debut, they were considered to be the "youngest" South Korean girl group with an average age of below 13.5. The age of their youngest member, Janey, caused controversy followed by the debut of a much younger girl group, G-story, who were all below 10 years old. This led to new broadcasting regulations in South Korea.

== History ==
The group was composed of six girls under Jacyhan International. The girls made their debut with their song "Game" in August 2010. The group's average age during their debut was 13.5 years old, causing controversy.

In November 2010, the youngest member, Janey, was prohibited from performing on music shows due to new regulations regarding age.

In 2011, GP Basic made their comeback on various music programs with the single "Jelly Pop".

In 2013, it was announced that Janey would be joining D-Unit as a guest member. However the group sat down for an interview with Star N News, where Janey stated that GP Basic has not disbanded and she is still a member of the group. She explained: "I take charge of rap, energy, and prettiness in the team. In the past, I've always wanted to try being with D-Unit unnis and I'm glad that I actually had the chance in their anticipated comeback." and "Although I joined D-Unit, GP Basic is not disbanding. I fit in D-Unit's current album concept so I joined as a guest member." She was recommended by Block B's Zico into D-Unit then returned to GP Basic in July 2013.

On January 1, 2014, the group's official Facebook photo was changed to announce their comeback in February 2014. The group made a comeback on February 6, 2014, with "Pika Burnjuck". Their comeback was made with only five members - as Leah had left the group.

In early 2015, GP Basic began promotions in China without Janey. These promotions continued until the summer but without Trinity or Janey. Zion, Amet, and Mui performed as GP Super. They have not released a new single yet, but performed cover songs as well as Pika-Burnjuck on a few Chinese music programs.

== Former members ==
- Amet (에미트)
- Trinity (트리니티)
- Zion (자이온)
- Mooi (무이)
- Janey (제이니) [Byun Seung Mi (변승미)]
- Leah (레아)
- Hannah (헤나)

== Discography ==
=== Singles ===
Title	Year	Peak chart positions	Album
Title	Year	KOR	Album
"Game"	2010	60	Non-album singles
"I'll Be There"	2010	78	Non-album singles
"Jelly Pop"	2011	—	Non-album singles
"V" (팝콘걸)	2011	—	Non-album singles
"Christmas Carol" (시청 앞 캐롤)	2011	—	Non-album singles
"Ride the Edge" (Edge 타)	2012	—	Non-album singles
"Pika-Burnjuck" (삐까뻔쩍)	2014	—	Non-album singles
"—" denotes releases that did not chart.
