= Sunny Hill =

South Korean girl group

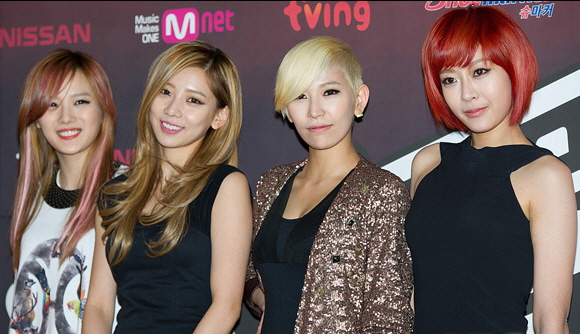
- Sunny Hill in February 2012 (L–R: Bitna, Jubi (former), Kota (former), Misung (former) )

Background information
- Origin: Seoul, South Korea
- Genres: K-pop; R&B; dance-pop; ballad
- Years active: 2007–present
- Labels: My Entertainment; For Everyone Media; Nega Network; Fave Entertainment; MUSIC&NEW; M.O.T. Entertainment
- Members: Bitna
- Past members: Jubi; Misung; Janghyun; Kota; Eunju; Geonhee

Sunny Hill (Korean: 써니힐) is a South Korean musical act currently consisting of singer Bitna (Korean: 빛나).

Sunny Hill debuted in 2007 as a co-ed singing group with members Janghyun, Jubi, and Bitna (then known as Seungah). Members Kota and Misung joined the group in 2010 and 2011, respectively. In the early 2010s, the group released several hit songs, including "Pit-A-Pat," "Midnight Circus", "The Grasshopper Song," and "Is The White Horse Coming?".

After Janghyun left the group in 2014, Sunny Hill began promoting as a four-member girl group. Following the departures of Jubi and Misung, two new members, Eunju and Geonhee, joined the group in 2019. As of 2025, Bitna is the only remaining member of Sunny Hill, releasing solo music under the group's name.

== History ==
=== 2007–2009: Debut with Love Letter and 2008 My Summer ===
Sunny Hill debuted in September 2007 as a co-ed group consisting of members Janghyun, Jubi, and Seung Ah. Their first release was the single album Love Letter, which later won the Excellent Newcomer Album award. Following this success, the group released their second single album, 2008 My Summer. The group then had a musical hiatus, and only released various songs for film and drama soundtracks.

=== 2010–2011: Label and line-up changes and Midnight Circus ===
Following their musical hiatus, Sunny Hill unexpectedly changed labels to Nega Network, home of girl group Brown Eyed Girls. Nega Network later introduced a new member Kota for the group.

Sunny Hill was quickly thrown into their first project under Nega Network by featuring on Narsha's digital single "Mamma Mia". Janghyun did not vocally participate in the track, but was featured in the music video. The group quickly became known as "Narsha's Group", due to lack of popularity amongst fans of K-pop. Following promotions of "Mamma Mia", Nega Network introduced a new member for the group, Misung. The quintet released single "Pit-A-Pat" for the Korean drama The Greatest Love. The song attracted much attention and charted high.

Sunny Hill made another unexpected label change to LOEN Entertainment. On June 3, 2011, Sunny Hill's first extended play, Midnight Circus with the lead single being the title track. On August 4, 2011, Sunny Hill released their follow-up ballad, "Pray". The song continued the group's growing popularity and charted on the Top 10 of the Gaon Chart, despite there being no live promotions.

=== 2012–2013: Antique Romance and Young Folk ===
On January 13, 2012, Sunny Hill made their comeback with their first maxi-single "The Grasshoppers". On January 20, it was announced that Janghyun would be entering his mandatory military service on January 31. The single peaked at the Top 3 of the Gaon Chart.

On April 14, it was announced that Sunny Hill would be making comeback as four-member girl group with digital single, "Is the White Horse Coming?". Sunny Hill released their digital single Is The White Horse Coming? on April 19. The next day, it was reported that the song had topped in the several music site such as Soribada, Melon, Mnet, and Bugs.

On December 6, Sunny Hill's second extended play, Antique Romance with the lead single "Goodbye to Romance". The track was said to be about the members' first love story. The album was successful and both songs of the album reached the Top 10 songs in Gaon Chart.

On April 5, Sunny Hill released collaboration single Love Actually with South Korean modern rock group called Daybreak, as a part of project album Re:code - Episode III. Misung also participated as co-produced and co-wrote for the song. On April 6, the music video was released featured cameo appearances from comedian Kim Sungwon, Defconn, and ZE:A member Kwanghee. The collaboration single was peaked at No. 7.

On June 10, it was announced that Sunny Hill would be making comeback with their third extended play, Young Folk. The lead single would be folk music with featured folk musician Hareem. The same day, the group held a showcase announcing their comeback. Sunny Hill official released their third extended play, Young Folk on June 19 and charted high on real-time charts.

On August 13, Kota was featured in a duet with SS501's Kim Hyung-jun entitled "Always Love You", a special digital single, with a release of a video teaser on August 8. The song is an acoustic medium R&B produced by Kim Hyung Jun himself, while the music video has an innocent love story theme, filmed on Hanseo University's airfield.

On October 30, 2013, Leader Janghyun was discharged from his military service.

=== 2014–2017: Janghyun's departure, reformation as girl group, Sunny Blues, Way, and contract expiration ===
On January 17, LOEN announced that Sunny Hill would be returned as co-ed group with their third digital single Don't Say Anything. It was announced that Janghyun's the last participated with the group before departure to pursue his career as a producer. Sunny Hill official released their third digital single Don't Say Anything for the last time as co-ed group on January 24.

Sunny Hill released their first studio album, Sunny Blues, separated into Part A and Part B, seven years after their debut. They released Sunny Blues Part A, consisting of eight tracks with the lead single "Monday Blues" on August 21, 2014.Sunny Blues Part B released on January 29, 2015, consists of nine tracks with the lead single "Child in Time".

Sunny Hill released their fourth single album Way with the lead single "On the Way Home" on August 29, 2016. The song is an upbeat mix of old pop and electronic that depicts the story about one's desires to return home, and get away from the tough side of reality.

On August 18, 2017, LOEN Entertainment released a statement announcing that Sunny Hill had left the label and would continue as a group elsewhere.

=== 2019–present: Second line-up changes and comeback with Nom Nom Nom ===
On April 25, 2019, Sunny Hill joined BOD Entertainment. The group remained with Bitna (formerly SeungAh), Kota and two new members Eunju (formerly a soloist under the name "Ray.B") and Geonhee (former member of Purfles) after Jubi and Misung had chosen to leave the group.

On October 14, 2019, the group announced they would be having a comeback on October 22, although this was later delayed to October 25.

Kota auditioned to be part of the new project group WSG Wannabe and made it in, pausing her activities within Sunny Hill to participate.

On September 16, 2023, Bitna, Eunju & Geonhee, began performing as a trio, and Kota confirmed via her Instagram that she had left the group, but supported them and wished them well in their future endeavours.

== Band members ==
Current members

- Bitna (빛나) (2007–present)

Former members

- Janghyun (장현) (2007–2014; inactive 2012–2013)
- Jubi (주비) (2007–2018)
- Kota (코타) (2010–2023)
- Misung (미성) (2011–2018)
- Eunju (은주) (2018–2025; inactive 2021–2023)
- Geonhee (건희) (2018–2025; inactive 2021–2023)

== Discography ==
=== Studio albums ===
Title	Album details	Peak positions	Sales
Title	Album details	KOR	Sales
Sunny Blues	Part A: Released: August 21, 2014; Label: LOEN Entertainment; Formats: CD, digital download	14	KOR: 1,517
Sunny Blues	Part B: Released: January 29, 2015; Label: LOEN Entertainment; Formats: CD, digital download	7	KOR: 1,029

=== Extended plays ===
Title	Details	Peak positions	Sales
Title	Details	KOR	Sales
Midnight Circus	Released: June 3, 2011; Label: LOEN Entertainment; Formats: CD, digital download; Track listing: 1. Girl With a Accordion (Intro); 2. Marionette (꼭두각시); 3. Midnight Circus; 4. Let's Talk About (Feat. Zia); 5. Pray (기도) (Preview); 6. Midnight Circus (Inst.)	20	KOR: 1,115
Antique Romance	Released: December 13, 2012; Label: LOEN Entertainment; Formats: CD, digital download; Track listing: 1. Cold Day ((추워지니 With Yoon Hyun-sang); 2. Goodbye To Romance; 3. Marry Me? ((결혼할래요?); 4. 3-Out; 5. Goodbye To Romance (Inst.); 6. Marry Me? (Inst.)	10	KOR: 1,548
Young Folk	Released: June 19, 2013; Label: LOEN Entertainment; Formats: CD, digital download; Track listing: 1. Romantic Comics ((순정만화); 2. Darling of All Hearts ((만인의 연인 (Feat. Hareem)); 3. Sitcom ((시트콤); 4. Anything You Want; 5. I Don't Know About Too Many Things ((모르는 게 많아서); 6. Darling of All Hearts (Inst.)	12	KOR: 2,040
Way	Released: August 31, 2016; Label: LOEN Entertainment; Formats: CD, digital download; Track listing: 1. Big Girls Don't Cry; 2. On the Way Home ((집으로 가는 길)); 3. Role Model; 4. On the Way Home (Inst.)	—	
Nom Nom Nom (놈놈놈)	Released: October 25, 2019; Label: B.O.D Entertainment, Music&NEW; Formats: CD, digital download; Track listing: 1. Nom Nom Nom ((놈놈놈); 2. From Oz; 3. Tear Drop ((눈물닭발); 4. Nom Nom Nom (Inst.); 5. From Oz (Inst.); 6. Tear Drop (Inst.)	—	
"—" denotes releases that did not chart.

=== Single albums ===
Title	Album details	Peak positions	Sales
Title	Album details	KOR (Note: The Gaon Chart was established in 2010.)	Sales
Love Letter	Released: September 20, 2007; Label: For Everyone Media, Soribada Media; Formats: CD, digital download; Track listing: 1. Because It's You (너니까); 2. Good-Bye New York; 3. Ring Back Tone (통화 연결음); 4. Leave (가버려); 5. Because It's You (Inst.); 6. Good-Bye New York (Inst.); 7. Ring Back Tone (Inst.); 8. Leave (Inst.)	—	
2008 My Summer (2008 내가 여름이다)	Released: July 3, 2008; Label: Nega Network, Vitamin Entertainment; Formats: CD, digital download; Track listing: 1. I Know Love Only (사랑밖엔 난 몰라); 2. Elastic (고무줄 (Sub. Cool comeback)); 3. My Girl; 4. I Know Love Only (Inst.); 5. Elastic (Sub. Cool comeback) (Inst.); 6. My Girl (Inst.)	—	
The Grasshoppers	Released: January 13, 2012; Label: LOEN Entertainment; Formats: CD, digital download	2	KOR: 12,134
Adiós Amor (아디오스 아모르)	Released: March 12, 2020; Label: B.O.D Entertainment, Music&NEW; Formats: CD, digital download; Track listing: 1. Adiós Amor (아디오스 아모르); 2. Finally (드디어, 우리); 3. Adiós Amor (Inst.); 4. Finally (Inst.)	—	
"—" denotes releases that did not chart.

=== Singles ===
Title	Year	Peak chart positions		Sales	Album
Title	Year	KOR	KOR Hot	Sales	Album
"Ring Back Tone" (통화 연결음)	2007	—	—	—N/a	Love Letter
"Because It's You (Winter Ver.)" (너니까)	2007	—	—	—N/a	Non-album single
"Love Is All I Know" (사랑밖엔 난 몰라)	2008	—	—	—N/a	2008 My Summer
"You Don't Know" (너는 모르지)	2009	—	—	—N/a	Non-album single
"Pit-A-Pat" (두근두근)	2011	7	—	KOR: 1,521,710	The Greatest Love Pt. 3
"Midnight Circus"	2011	11	—	KOR: 1,441,832	Midnight Circus
"Pray" (기도)	2011	9	21	KOR: 621,902	Non-album single
"The Grasshopper Song" (베짱이 찬가)	2012	4	9	KOR: 1,997,619	The Grasshoppers
"Is The White Horse Coming?" also known as "Princess and Prince Charming" (백마는 오고 있는가)	2012	10	14	KOR: 589,285	Non-album single
"Goodbye To Romance"	2012	5	7	KOR: 881,995	Antique Romance
"Darling of All Hearts" (만인의 연인) (feat. Hareem)	2013	9	5	KOR: 454,572	Young Folk
"Don't Say Anything" (아무말도 하지마요)	2014	24	21	KOR: 159,868	Non-album single
"Once in Summer" (그 해 여름)	2014	27	—	KOR: 122,547	Sunny Blues
"Monday Blues"	2014	83	—	KOR: 49,126	Sunny Blues
"Here I Am" (지우다)	2014	68	—	KOR: 51,097	Non-album single
"Child in Time" (교복을 벗고)	2015	33	—	KOR: 80,436	Sunny Blues
"On The Way Home" (집으로 가는 길)	2016	— (Note: "On The Way Home" did not enter the Gaon Digital Chart, but it peaked at number 75 on the component Download Chart.)	—	KOR: 19,217	Way
"Crossroads" (두 갈래 길)	2017	—	—	N/A	Non-album single
"Nom Nom Nom" (놈놈놈)	2019	—	—	N/A	Nom Nom Nom
"Adiós Amor" (아디오스 아모르)	2020	—	—	N/A	Adiós Amor
"After Meeting You" (너를 만나고)	2021	— (Note: "After Meeting You" did not enter the Gaon Digital Chart, but it peaked at number 143 on the component Download Chart.)	—	N/A	Non-album singles
"Hold Me Again" (안녕이란 말 대신)	2022	— (Note: "Hold Me Again" did not enter the Gaon Digital Chart, but it peaked at number 33 on the component Download Chart.)	—	N/A	Non-album singles
"You Walk, I'll Run" (넌 걸어와 난 달려갈게)	2024	— (Note: "You Walk, I'll Run" did not enter the Circle Digital Chart, but it peaked at number 92 on the component Download Chart.)	—	N/A	Non-album singles
"Hard to Explain" (설명이 어려워)	2024	— (Note: "Hard to Explain" did not enter the Circle Digital Chart, but it peaked at number 64 on the component Download Chart.)	—	N/A	Non-album singles
"Cotton Candy" (솜사탕) (feat. Eunjung of T-ara)	2024	— (Note: "Cotton Candy" did not enter the Circle Digital Chart, but it peaked at number 45 on the component Download Chart.)	—	N/A	Non-album singles
"On the Way to Meet You" (널 만나러 가는 길) (feat. Able)	2025	— (Note: "On the Way to Meet You" did not enter the Circle Digital Chart, but it peaked at number 99 on the component Download Chart.)	—	N/A	Non-album singles
"Let's Go" (함께 떠나볼까)	2025	— (Note: "Let's Go" did not enter the Circle Digital Chart, but it peaked at number 114 on the component Download Chart.)	—	N/A	Non-album singles
"Thinking of You Tonight"	2025	—	—	N/A	Non-album singles
"—" denotes releases that did not chart.

=== Collaborations ===
Year	Song	Other performer(s)	Album
2010	"Mamma Mia"	Narsha	Narsha (EP)
2012	"Brave Girls"	Zia	LOEN TREE Summer Story
2013	"들었다 놨다 (Love Actually)"	DAYBREAK	re;code Episode III

=== Soundtrack appearances ===
Year	Song	Album
2008	"잘나가던 여자"	Last Scandal OST
2008	"아파한다"	Little Mom Scandal OST
2011	"두근두근 (Pit-A-Pat)"	The Greatest Love OST Pat3
2012	"사랑한다 (I Love You)"	Salamander Guru and The Shadows OST Part 2
2012	"Do It"	I Love Lee Taly OST Part 1
2013	"Counting Stars at Night"	You Are the Best! OST Part 3
2014	"Cunning Thoughts"	Cunning Single Lady OST Part 3
2014	"낭랑 18세 (Sweet 18)"	Immortal Songs: Singing the Legend (Park Si-chun)
2015	"Say I Love You"	Flower of Queen OST Part 1
2015	"I Like You"	All About My Mom OST Part 1
2017	"Hello Tomorrow / Goma Move"	Shōnen Ashibe GO! GO! Goma-chan OST

=== Music videos ===
Title	Year	Director
"Love Is All I Know"	2008	
"Mamma Mia" (With Narsha)	2011	
"Midnight Circus"	2011	Hwang Soo-ah
"Midnight Circus (Stage Ver.)"	2011	
"Pray"	2011	Hwang Soo-ah
"The Grasshopper Song"	2012	Hwang Soo-ah
"Princess and Prince Charming"	2012	Hwang Soo-ah
"Do It"	2012	
"Goodbye To Romance"	2012	Hwang Soo-ah
"Cold Day" (With Yoon Hyun-sang)	2012	
"Love Actually" (With DAYBREAK)	2013	
"Darling Of All Hearts" (Feat. Hareem)	2013	Hwang Soo-ah
"Don't say anything"	2014	
"Once in Summer"	2014	
"Monday Blues"	2014	Hong Won-ki
"Here I Am"	2014	
"Child in Time"	2015	Hong Won-ki
"Child in Time (Lip Ver.)"	2015	
"on the way home"	2016	
"Crossroads"	2017	
"NomNomNom"	2019	

== Awards and nominations ==
Award ceremony	Year	Category	Nominee/work	Result	Ref.
Cyworld Digital Music Awards	2007	Rookie of the Month (October)	"Ring Back Tone"	Won	
Melon Music Awards	2011	Best Original Soundtrack	"Pit-A-Pat"	Won	
Melon Music Awards	2011	Best Music Video	"Midnight Circus"	Nominated	
Mnet Asian Music Awards	2011	Best Music Video	"Midnight Circus"	Nominated	
