= Love Diary (C-REAL EP) =

EP by C-REAL
- Released: March 7, 2012
- Recorded: 2012
- Genre: K-pop, dance-pop
- Label: NAP Entertainment, LOEN Entertainment
- Producer: Choi Kap Won

C-REAL chronology
Round 1 (2011)	Love Diary (2012)	Sorry But I (2012)

Singles from Love Diary
- 1. "JOMA JOMA" Released: March 7, 2012

"Love Diary" is the second extended play for the South Korean girl group C-REAL. The album was promoted through the song "JOMA JOMA". The album peaked at #9 on the second week of March in Gaon Weekly Albums Chart while the single landed on #27 in Mnet Music Charts.

== Background ==
C-REAL's second mini-album was produced by the same producer as to their first EP which is Choi Kap Won. The group promoted the song JOMA JOMA, which is included in the album. The teaser was uploaded on March 1, 2012. The full music video was released along with the mini-album on March 7, 2012.

== Track listing ==
No.	Title	Lyrics	Music	Arrangement	Length
1.	"Love Diary"	Choi Kap Won	PJ, Saad	PJ, Saad	1:04
2.	"JOMA JOMA"	Choi Kap Won	PJ, Han Sang Won	PJ, Han Sang Won	3:24
3.	"Like me? Love me?"	Choi Kap Won, 17Holic	Kim Jin Hoon	Kim Jin Hoon	3:44
4.	"I Like You"	Choi Kap Won	Kim Yong Hyun, Kim Jin Hoon	Kim Yong Hyun, Kim Jin Hoon	3:30
5.	"Like a Bad Boy"	Choi Kap Won	Jeon Goon, Kim Jin Hoon, Choi Kap Woon	Jeon Goon, Kim Jin Hoon	3:10
6.	"JOMA JOMA (Tap Cut Ver.) Inst."	-	PJ, Han Sang Won	PJ, Han Sang Won	3:23

== Charts ==
=== Album charts ===
Chart	Peak Position
Gaon Weekly Albums Chart	9

=== Single charts ===
Chart	Peak Position
Mnet Music Charts	27
Inki Coloring	6
