= A.cian =

South Korean boy band

A.cian (에이션)
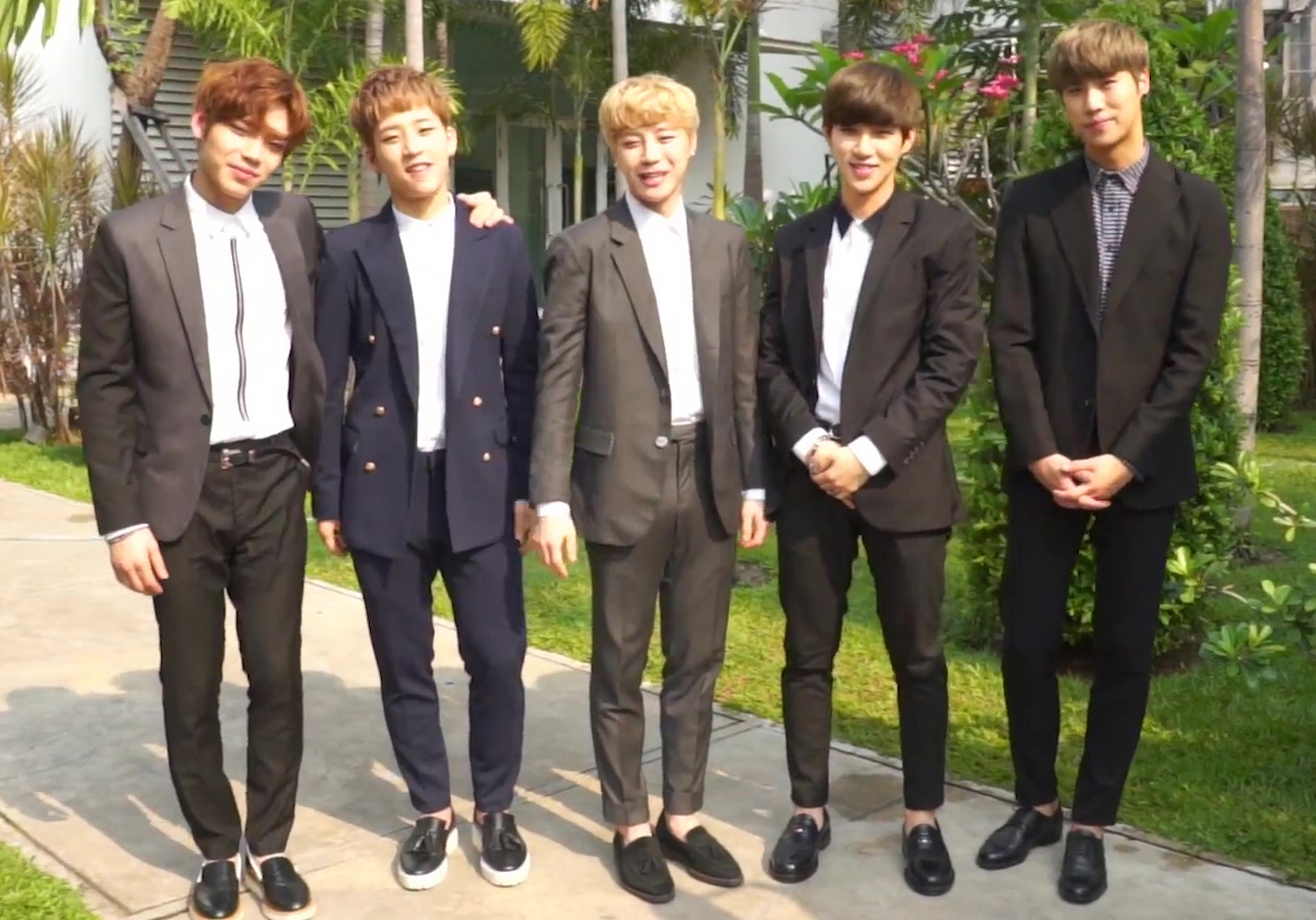

Background information
- Origin: Seoul, South Korea
- Genres: K-pop
- Years active: 2012–2020
- Labels: Wings Entertainment; Elijah Entertainment
- Past members: Jungsang; Hyeokjin; Sanghyun; Jin.O; U-Tae; Seulgi; Chanhee; Crooge; Hidden; Lo-J; Sehee
- Website: www.wingsent.com

A.cian (Korean: 에이션; pronounced Asian) is a South Korean boy band formed by Wings Entertainment (formerly ISS Entertainment) in Seoul, South Korea. The group currently consists of four members: Jungsang, Hyeokjin, Sanghyun and Jino. They debuted on September 28, 2012, with the single "Stuck".

== Members ==
=== Current ===
- Jungsang (정상)
- Hyeokjin (혁진)
- Sanghyun (상현)
- Jin.O (진오)

=== Former ===
- U-Tae (우태)
- Seulgi (슬기)
- Chanhee (찬희)
- Crooge (크루지)
- Hidden (히든)
- Lo-J (로제이)
- Sehee (세희)

== Discography ==
=== Extended plays ===
Title	Album details	Peak chart positions
Title	Album details	KOR
Stuck	Released: October 5, 2012; Label: Wings Entertainment, CJ E&M; Formats: CD, digital download; Track listing: 1. Berserker Tune; 2. Stuck; 3. Where's All My Love?; 4. A.cian!!	—
Stuck	Re-released: November 24, 2012 (Hit); Label: Wings Entertainment, CJ E&M; Formats: CD, digital download; Track listing: 1. Hit; 2. Lie (거짓말); 3. Where’s All My Love?; 4. Poisoning; 5. Stuck; 6. Where's All My Love? inst.; 7. Stuck inst.	81
"—" denotes releases that did not chart.

=== Single albums ===
Title	Album details	Peak chart positions
Title	Album details	KOR
Ouch	Released: October 31, 2014; Label: Wings Entertainment, Mono Music Korea; Formats: CD, digital download; Track listing: 1. Ouch; 2. So Happy Together (우리 둘이); 3. Up & Down	—
RelAcian	Released: April 27, 2015; Label: Wings Entertainment, Mono Music Korea, LOEN Entertainment; Formats: CD, digital download; Track listing: 1. Driving; 2. Mixed Up (삐끗 삐끗); 3. Just Leave (그냥 떠나가)	—
"—" denotes releases that did not chart.

=== Singles ===
Title	Year	Peak chart positions	Album
Title	Year	KOR	Album
"Stuck"	2012	—	Stuck
"Hit"	2012	—	Hit
"Love At First Sight" (첫눈에 반했어)	2013	—	Non-album single
"So Happy Together" (우리 둘이)	2014	—	Ouch
"Ouch"	2014	—	Ouch
"Somebody To Love"	2015	—	Non-album single
"Magic Girl" (마녀시대)	2015	—	Non-album single
"Driving"	2015	—	RelAcian
"Just Leave" (그냥 떠나가)	2015	—	RelAcian
"Touch" (손이가요)	2016	—	Non-album single
"Take Care In Summer" (여름아 부탁해) feat. Lee Subin and Highteen	2016	—	Non-album single
"—" denotes releases that did not chart.
