= C-REAL =

South Korean girl group

- Origin: Seoul, South Korea
- Genres: K-pop; dance; R&B
- Years active: 2011–2014
- Labels: N.A.P Entertainment
- Past members: Lenny; Re Dee; Chemi; Effie; Ann J

C-REAL (Korean: 씨리얼) was a five-member South Korean girl group formed by NAP Entertainment in 2011. They debuted with their song No No No No No on October 12, 2011. Their group name was taken from the first letter of each member's name. They are dubbed as the "5-IU Idols" because they are produced by Choi Kab Won, who also produced IU.

== History ==
=== 2011: Debut with Round 1 ===
C-REAL released their debut EP, Round 1, with the title track "No No No No No" produced by Brave Brothers, on October 12, 2011.

In November 2011, C-REAL started their Japanese promotions through a route different from their peers. Following their debut showcase, the girls put their future contract up for auction, signing with the label that provides the best conditions. Unlike other groups who sign with an agency before heading over, the girls will be using the 'posting system', a method favored by professional baseball players. Since their debut in October, the girls were nicknamed the 5-IU idols, which had generated interest overseas.

On December 6, 2011, the group participated in the OST of Flower Boy Ramen Shop with a song is entitled "Just Say It".

=== 2012: Love Diary, "Sorry But I" and "Danger Girl" ===
In March 2012 the group released their second EP, Love Diary, with its title track "Joma Joma". Later that month the group, participated in Hope Concert for Multicultural Families, with other idols such as FT Island, ZE:A and Stellar.

C-REAL released their first digital single, "Sorry But I", on May 16, 2012. It was the group's first release to chart on Gaon Digital Chart, debuting at 90. Their second digital single "Danger Girl was released on December 14, 2012.

=== 2013: Line-up changes & Possible disbandment ===
In March 2013, N.A.P announced that the group would be going on indefinite hiatus due to the members returning to school. As the group has been inactive since September 2014, many fans speculate that the group has disbanded, however no official statement has been made.

== Discography ==
=== Extended play ===
Title	Album details	Peak chart positions	Sales
Title	Album details	KOR	Sales
Round 1	Released: October 12, 2011; Label: N.A.P Entertainment, K&C Music; Formats: CD, digital download	18	KOR: 2,571
Love Diary	Released: March 7, 2012; Label: N.A.P Entertainment, K&C Music; Formats: CD, digital download	9	KOR: 1,674

=== Singles ===
Title	Year	Peak chart positions	Sales (DL)	Album
Title	Year	KOR	Sales (DL)	Album
"No No No No No"	2011	—	—N/a	Round 1
"Joma Joma"	2012	93	KOR: 41,980	Love Diary
"Sorry But I"	2012	90	KOR: 46,277	Non-album singles
"Danger Girl"	2012	—	—N/a	Non-album singles
"—" denotes releases that did not chart.

=== Soundtrack appearances ===
Year	Title	Album
2011	"Just Say It" (말론)	Flower Boy Ramen Shop OST
