= Wonder Boyz =

2012–2014 South Korean hip hop group

- Origin: Seoul, South Korea
- Genres: K-pop; hip hop
- Years active: 2012–2014
- Labels: Ent102
- Past members: Bakchigi; Young Boy; K; Master One

Wonder Boyz (Korean: 원더보이즈) was a South Korean Hip hop group formed by Ent102 in 2012. They debuted on October 16, 2012, with Open The Door.

== Discography ==
=== Extended plays ===
Title	Album details	Peak chart positions	Sales
Title	Album details	KOR	Sales
Open The Door (문을 여시오)	Released: October 16, 2012; Label: Ent102, CJ E&M; Formats: CD, digital download	13	KOR: 2,969

=== Singles ===
Title	Year	Peak chart positions	Sales (DL)	Album
Title	Year	KOR	Sales (DL)	Album
"Open The Door"	2012	—	—N/a	Open The Door
"Tarzan"	2013	—	—N/a	Non-album single
"—" denotes releases that did not chart.
