= A-Prince =

South Korean boy band

- Origin: Seoul, South Korea
- Genres: K-pop; Dance-pop
- Years active: 2012–2015
- Labels: New Planet Entertainment
- Past members: Sungwon; Minhyuk; Seungjun; Siyoon; Woobin

A-Prince (Korean: 에이프린스) was a South Korean boy band formed by New Planet Entertainment in Seoul, South Korea. The group debuted on July 25, 2012, with "You're The Only One".

== Members ==
- Sungwon (성원)
- Minhyuk (민혁)
- Seungjun (승준)
- Siyoon (시윤)
- Woobin (우빈)

== Discography ==
=== Extended plays ===
Title	Album details	Peak chart positions	Sales
Title	Album details	KOR	Sales
Hello	Released: November 6, 2012; Label: New Planet Entertainment, Danal Entertainment; Formats: CD, digital download	—	—
Mambo	Released: June 25, 2013; Label: Sony Music; Formats: CD, digital download	14	KOR: 1,731

=== Single albums ===
Title	Album details	Peak chart positions	Sales
Title	Album details	KOR	Sales
Peter Pan's Kiss Scene (Peter Pan's '키스할래요')	Released: March 28, 2014; Label: New Planet Entertainment, KT Music; Formats: CD, digital download	31	KOR: 891

=== Singles ===
Title	Year	Album
TAKEN
"Young Boy"	2011	Only You
A-PRINCE
"Hello"	2012	Hello
"You're the Only One"	2012	Non-album singles
"Mambo"	2013	Mambo
"Romantic Gangwon"	2013	Non-album singles
"Kiss Scene"	2014	Kiss Scene
"Yes Or No"	2014	Non-album singles
