= D-Unit =

South Korean girl group

- Origin: South Korea
- Genres: K-pop, pop, hip hop
- Years active: 2012–2013
- Label: D-Business Entertainment
- Past members: UJin; Zin; Ram; JNey (guest member)

D-Unit (Korean: 디유닛) was a South Korean girl group under the label D-Business Entertainment. The groups concept includes the addition of a new member with every promotion cycle. The group debuted as a trio consisting of Ram, UJin and Zin with a full-length album, featuring the title track "I’m Missin’ You" on August 1, 2012. This was followed by their debut stage on August 2, 2012 on M!Countdown. In March 2013, D-UNIT added their first guest member, JNey, a member of GP Basic.

== History ==
=== 2012: Debut & Luv Me ===
On July 2, 2012, D-Unit released their first teaser of "I'm Missin' You" which featured member UJin. On July 4, 2012, D-Business Entertainment officially stated that the group would be holding a fan signing in Japan before the group would make their Korean debut. On July 10, 2012, the group released their second teaser which featured member Ram. On July 16, 2012, D-Business Entertainment stated that the group would show their debut progress to fans through a reality TV show called "Welcome to D-Unit" and would air on July 18, 2012. On July 29, 2012, the group released an official teaser which would feature all three members. The following day on July 30, 2012, the group released an extended 1 minute teaser.

On August 1, 2012, D-Unit released their first album "Welcome To Business" and their first music video for their debut single "I'm Missin' You". On August 2, 2012, D-Unit made their stage debut on M!Countdown performing their debut single "I'm Missin' You". On August 2, 2012, released a dance version and dance tutorial for their single "I'm Missin' You"

=== 2013: Sleeping In (Part 2) and Affirmative Chapter 1 Comeback ===
In late 2012, it was originally revealed that the group will add a member or two to the group at the end of December. Before debut, D-Business confirmed that the group will increase and decrease the number of members at different times. The decision to keep the three member unit for "Luv Me" was due to the fact that the group saw "Luv Me" as a continuation of their debut, therefore felt it was necessary to keep the current line-up. However, no members were added in December.

The group released a digital single "Sleeping In (Part 2)", a remix of the song "Sleeping In" from their debut album. It was confirmed before the release that the group would have a comeback in February. The first teaser image was released on January 29, 2013, teasing the appearance of a fourth member. The addition was revealed to be JNEY of GP Basic. Some fans of GP Basic were worried that this meant that GP Basic had disbanded, but Janey assured fans she would only be a member for D-Unit's "Affirmative Chap. 1" album. On February 10, a teaser was released which announced Zico of Block B composed and produced the title track. On February 11, D-UNIT released "Stay Alive" featuring Vasco. On March 4, D-UNIT released their second studio album, "Affirmative Chap. 1." In May, it was announced RAM would be filming a reality show with sister Boram of T-ARA and her father. After "Talk to My Face" promotions, the group released a pre-release single "Thank You" featuring Beenzino. JNEY returned to GP Basic in July 2013. To commemorate the group's first anniversary in August, a remix of "Before the Weekend Comes" from the first studio album was released. Also in September, RAM and Z.I.N performed in Vancouver, British Columbia for the "2K13 Feel Korea Festival". In September, Z.I.N released digital single "I Don't Want You To Enlist."

On December 6, 2013, the remaining members released a new single titled "It's You". The music video teaser featured former Seeya and 5dolls member, Soomi. However, the full video has yet to be released. Fans have speculated that D-UNIT has disbanded or began an indefinite hiatus.

== Former members ==
- U-JIN
- ZIN
- RAM
- JNEY (Guest member & GP Basic member)

== Discography ==
=== Studio albums ===
Title	Album details	Peak chart positions	Sales
Title	Album details	KOR	Sales
Welcome To Business	Released: August 2, 2012; Label: D-Business Entertainment; Format: CD, digital download; Track listing: 1. Crush (feat. Dok2); 2. I’m Missin’ You; 3. 늦잠; 4. Turn The Lights On; 5. Stereo; 6. Goodbye TaTa; 7. Luv Vision; 8. 기념일; 9. 주말이 오기전에 (feat. Red Rock)	—	—N/a
Affirmative Chapter 1	Released: March 4, 2013; Label: D-Business Entertainment; Format: CD, digital download; Track listing: 1. Stay Alive (살아남아) (feat. Vasco); 2. 얼굴보고 얘기해; 3. Lockdown; 4. Alone; 5. Sleeping In Part 2 (늦잠 Part 2) (feat. Tae Wan); 6. 허수아비; 7. Luv Me	—	—N/a

=== Singles ===
Title	Year	Peak chart positions	Sales	Album
Title	Year	KOR	Sales	Album
"I'm Missin' You"	2012	57	KOR: 169,177	Welcome To Business
"Luv Me"	2012	93	KOR: 43,212	Affirmative Chapter 1
"Sleeping In Part 2" (늦잠 Part 2) feat. Tae Wan	2013	—	—N/a	Affirmative Chapter 1
"Stay Alive" (살아남아) feat. Vasco	2013	—	KOR: 18,289	Affirmative Chapter 1
"Talk to My Face" (얼굴보고 얘기해)	2013	53	KOR: 41,635	Affirmative Chapter 1
"Thank You" feat. Beenzino	2013	75	KOR: 39,145	Non-album singles
"Before the Weekend (Remix)" (주말이 오기전에 (Remix))	2013	—	—N/a	Non-album singles
"It's You" (너야)	2013	—	—N/a	Non-album singles

=== Music videos ===
Year	Music video	Length
2012	"Im Missin' You"	3:28
2012	"Luv Me"	3:15
2013	"얼굴보고 얘기해 (Talk to My Face)"	3:38
2013	"Thank You (feat. Beenzino)"	3:22
