= A-Jax (band) =

South Korean boyband

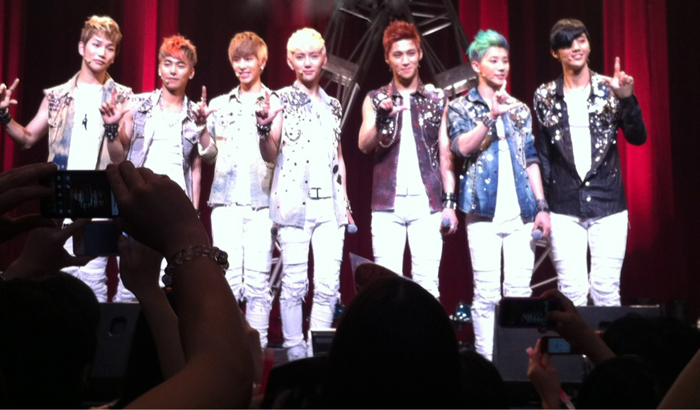
- Left to right: Sung-min, Ji-hoo, Yun-young, Jae-hyung, Hyeong-kon, Seung-jin, Seung-yeop

Background information
- Origin: Seoul, South Korea
- Genre: K-pop
- Years active: 2012–2018
- Labels: DSP Media; Universal Sigma
- Past members: Hyeongkon; Yunyoung; Seungjin; Seungyeop; Junghee; Sungmin; Jaehyung; Jihu
- Website: ajax.dspmedia.co.kr

A-Jax (Korean: 에이젝스, stylized in all caps) was a South Korean boy band formed by DSP Media in 2012. Early in their career, the group was known as DSP Boyz but then was changed to A-Jax. The group's final lineup was composed of five members: Hyeongkon, Yunyoung, Seungjin, Seungyeop, and Junghee. They made the first appearance on TV as a group on MBC Music's Making the Star – DSP Boyz on April 24, 2012. The group made its official debut with the single "One 4 U" in South Korea on June 1 and in Japan on August 8, 2012 with the same song.

== History ==
=== Pre-debut ===
The debut of the group was announced on April 1, 2012 with a video teaser of their MBC Music's show Making the Star. During that time, they were temporarily called as 'DSP Boyz'. More teasers of the show were revealed during the time on DSP Media's YouTube account, the second on April 4, the third on April 9 and the last on April 12. On April 13, the group signed a two-year contract as endorsement models for the sports casual brand Spris. DSP Media will be revealed to the members one by one starting on April 17 on DSP Media's YouTube account. Jaehyung 's on April 17. Yunyoung's on April 18. Jihu's (Hyojun at that time) on April 19. Sungmin's on April 20. Seungyeop and Hyeongkon's on April 22. Seungjin's on April 23.

DSP Media announced the group's official name as "A-Jax" on April 24 and DSP also explained the meaning of the group's name: "A-Jax is in reference to the mythological Greek hero that helped bring victory to the Greeks during the Trojan War." On May 7, a mysterious video featuring KARA's member Goo Hara was revealed on DSP Media's YouTube account with a male voice in the background. The video created a confusion because it was not revealed if the video was a teaser for an upcoming Korean comeback of KARA, or a teaser for an upcoming solo event of Hara, or something related to A-Jax. On May 10, another video of Hara was released, revealing that the teaser was related to A-Jax. In the teaser, a song of the group (at this time the name was not revealed) was playing at the background. On May 15, DSP Media released the song and music video of the song played on the teaser, called "Never Let Go". On the music video only appears Hara. Later it was stated that the song was only a prologue song.

On May 21, it was revealed that A-Jax was set to be the opening act in KARA's last two shows of their first tour, Karasia, in Saitama, Japan. The members stated "It's an honor to be able to stand on such a big stage before our debut. It'll be a learning experience for us. As it is a great opportunity, we're going to work to show as much of our charm as possible."

=== 2012: Debut with One 4 U and 2MYX ===
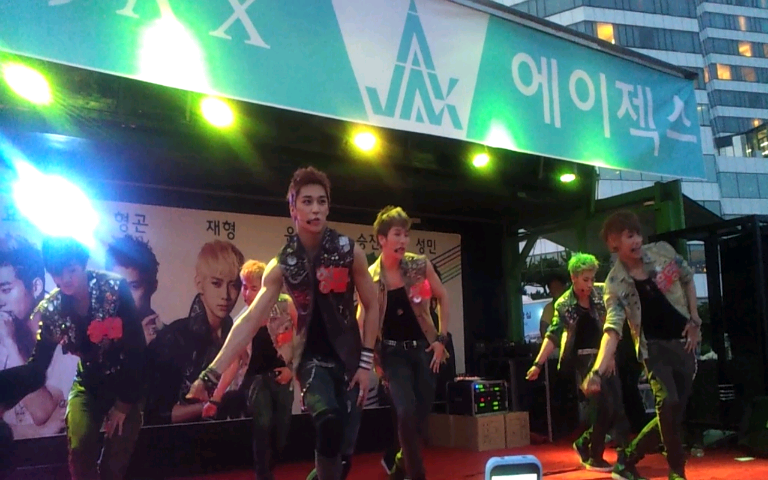
20120709 Daejeon Wing Car event

On May 1, it was revealed that the group will be debuting in South Korea and Japan simultaneously in 2012. It was also revealed by DSP that "A-Jax will be the first Korean idol group to debut within Korea and Japan simultaneously, and will follow in the footsteps of the group SS501. A-Jax has signed under the equivalent conditions that other Korean male idol groups, who have already established their popularity, have been given, making it an unprecedented event. Thus, they are receiving much attention from Japanese music industry insiders." For their Japanese releases, they signed with the label Universal Sigma, where their labelmates Kara and Rainbow are currently signed.

On May 28, DSP Media released, on A-Jax's YouTube account, a teaser of the music video for their official debut song "One 4 U". It was later stated that the music video had cost $42,500 USD only with CG effects. The music video and full single of "One 4 U" were released on June 1. The group made its official debut on TV music shows on MBC's Show! Music Core on June 2, with the songs "Never Let Go" (used as opening) and "One 4 U". On June 4, it was stated that the group will perform on Japan's a-nation, along with the artists/groups AAA, Aaron, Breathe, Da Pump, Deep, Daichi Miura, Shu-I, U-KISS and 4ever. The event will be held in Yoyogi on August 9.

On June 19, Universal Sigma announced that "One 4 U" was re-recorded in Japanese and will be released as their debut single in Japan. The single will be released on August 8, 2012. It was also announced that the group will make a Handshake event commemorating the release of the single. It will be held in Tokyo on August 8, Osaka on August 10, Nagoya on August 11 and in Fukuoka on August 12.

On July 7, DSP Media started an event called "Wing Car Project", to the group meet their fans outside Seoul. In that same statement, it was also announced that the group will be releasing a new digital single in July. One day later, it was revealed a photo of the truck's back, revealing the name of the new single, titled "Hot Game". The single was officially released on July 11, 2012 as "One 4 U" follow-up song. On July 17, A-Jax's fan-cafe was updated with the group's fan name, to be titled "A-Light". On August 9, Universal Sigma announced that "Hot Game" was re-recorded in Japanese and will be released as the group's second Japanese single, to be released on October 31, 2012.

The group released their debut mini album titled 2MYX on November 15. The EP includes three new songs and the songs already released in South Korea, "One 4 U", "Never Let Go" and "Hot Game".

=== 2013–2019: Insane, Snake, Lineup changes, and disbandment ===
On June 26, 2013, it was revealed on A-Jax's official Twitter account that the group will be returning with their 2nd mini-album entitled Insane, with the song of same title being the promotional track. It was also revealed the mini-album's cover. The mini-album will be released on July 11, 2013 with distribution by LOEN Entertainment.

On October 21, 2013, the agency announced the group's comeback when they unveiled the album jacket photo for upcoming single “Snake”. “Snake” is said to be of the lighthearted and funky rock genre where the lyrics allude a young boy's love to that of a snake.

In December 2014, the group participated to DSP Media's special Christmas Album White Letter with the song "Like Lovers" (Korean: 연인처럼) featuring labelmate Oh Jong Hyuk as well as title track "White".

On January 8, 2015, DSP Media announced that Jaehyung would enlist in the army as a public service officer. On January 7, 2016, it was announced by DSP Media that Sungmin had left the group. On February 5, 2016, DSP Media announced the departure of Jaehyung and Jihu. Jihu and Sungmin would remain with the label, while Jaehyung's contract was terminated. Junghee was added to the group and A-Jax will continue promoting as a quintet. On December 11, 2016, the group held a showcase, in Tokyo, Japan, titled A-JAX SHOWCASE [A-JAX RISING].

On September 19, 2017, the group released their third Japanese single, "Romeo." Members Seungjin and Junghee will be participating the idol rebooting show KBS's The Unit.

On March 31, 2019, it was announced the group members contract expired with DSP Media, and the group officially disbanded.

== Former Members ==
- Hyeongkon (형곤)
- Yunyoung (윤영)
- Seungjin (승진)
- Seungyeop (승엽)
- Junghee (중희)
- Sungmin (성민)
- Jaehyung (재형)
- Jihu (지후)

== Discography ==
A-Jax discography
- Extended plays: 3
- Singles: 6
- Music videos: 6

=== Extended plays ===
Title	Album details	Peak chart positions		Sales
Title	Album details	KOR	JPN	Sales
Korean
2MYX	Released: November 15, 2012; Label: DSP Media, CJ E&M; Format: CD, digital download	6	—	KOR: 2,856+
Insane	Released: July 11, 2013; Label: DSP Media, LOEN Entertainment; Format: CD, digital download	8	—	KOR: 2,067+
Snake	Released: October 28, 2013; Label: DSP Media, LOEN Entertainment; Format: CD, digital download	13	—	KOR: 1,442+
"—" denotes releases that did not chart or were not released in that region.

=== Singles ===
Year	Title	Peak chart positions		Sales	Album
Year	Title	KOR	JPN	Sales	Album
Korean
2012	"One 4 U" / "Never Let Go" (B-side)	167; 164	—		2MYX
2012	"Hot Game"	59	—		2MYX
2012	"2MYX"	188	—		2MYX
2013	"Insane"	123	—		Insane
2013	"Snake"	172	—		Snake
2014	"Like Lovers" feat Oh Jong-Hyuk	—	—		White Letter
Japanese
2012	"One 4 U"	—	29	JPN: 4,030	Non-album single
2012	"Hot Game"	—	31	JPN: 3,692	Non-album single
2017	"Romeo"	—	51	JPN: 949	Non-album single
2018	"You"				
"—" denotes releases that did not chart or were not released in that region.

=== Collaborations ===
Year	Title	Member(s)	Album/Single	Note
2014	White	All	White Letter	
2016	Fingertips love	All	Creating a Healthy Cyber World; Campaign song	With B1A4, BTOB, APRIL, Heo Young-ji, Oh My Girl & Kassy

== Filmography ==
- MBC Making the Star: DSP Boyz (2012)
- SNS Drama "Vampire's Flower" (2014)
- Hyeongkon made a guest appearance in the Taiwanese-Korean collaboration The Cage, starring Won Tae-hee and directed by Lior Shamriz.
