= List of South Korean idol groups =

Idol musical bands in South Korea started to appear after the success of Seo Taiji and Boys, whose debut in 1992 is considered a turning point in the history of Korean popular music. 2012 was a record year in K-pop in terms of number of rookie artists: 33 male groups and 38 girl groups debuted.

This list of boy bands and girl groups is organized by year of debut.

== See also ==
- K-pop
- Korean idol
- List of South Korean boy bands
- List of South Korean girl groups
