= 2015 Idol Star Athletics Ssireum Basketball Futsal Archery Championships =

- Genre: Sports; Variety show
- Directed by: Jo Wook-hyung; Kang Sung-ah
- Presented by: Jun Hyun-moo; Kim Jung-geun; Hwang Kwanghee; Leeteuk; Jun Jin; Kim Young-chul
- Starring: Around 300 Idols
- Country of origin: South Korea
- Original language: Korean
- No. of episodes: 2

Production
- Production locations: Goyang Gymnasium; Jungangro 1601, Ilsanseo-gu, Goyang, Gyeonggi-do
- Running time: Monday, Tuesday at 17:55

Original release
- Network: MBC
- Release: September 28 – September 29, 2015

The 2015 Idol Star Athletics Ssireum Basketball Futsal Archery Championships (Korean: 아이돌스타 육상 씨름 농구 풋살 양궁 선수권대회) was held at Goyang Gymnasium in Goyang, South Korea on August 10 and 11, 2015 and was broadcast on MBC on September 28 and 29, 2015. At the championships, a total number of 8 events (4 in athletics and in ssireum, archery, futsal, basketball 1 each) were contested: 4 by men and 4 by women. There were around 300 K-pop singers and celebrities who participated, divided into 10 teams.

== Cast ==
=== Main ===
- Team Daitso: Super Junior, Shinee, CNBLUE, Infinite, AOA, Red Velvet, Lovelyz, N.Flying, NCT (group)'s Yuta and Jaehyun (singer)
- Team Yeo-vengers: Kara, Rainbow, Dal Shabet, GFriend, Minx, EXID
- Team Young because we run: ZE:A, Sistar, Nine Muses, B1A4, Yoo Seung-woo, Oh My Girl, Monsta X
- Team Who's the boss: Noel (band), Wonder Girls, Jeong Jinwoon, Lee Chang-min (singer), Lee Hyun, Miss A, Baek A-yeon, BTS, BESTie, Got7
- Team Yeonkidol: T-ara, Secret, Girls' Day, Sonamoo, DIA
- Team The return of the king: 4Minute, Beast, Apink, Roh Ji-hoon, BtoB, CLC, Yuto Adachi
- Team Real Man: Andy, Teen Top, Block B, VIXX, Myname, 100%, UP10TION
- Team Master out of power: Shorry, Big Star, Speed, History, Boys Republic, Wassup, Topp Dogg, Bigflo, HALO, Park Boram, 4Ten, Madtown
- Team World: Nichkhun, Fei, Kangnam, Sam Carter, Jackson Wang, Mark, 1kyne, Li Wenhan, Zhou Yixuan, Rena, Shannon (South Korean singer), Sorn, Vernon
- Team A day old puppy: Sleepy, So Yoo-mi, Ji He-ra, NC.A, Beatwin, Year 7 Class 1, Lip Service, Melody Day, Mamamoo, The Legend (band), La Boum, WANNA.B, Rubber Soul, Seventeen

== Results ==
=== Men ===
Athletics

Event	Gold	Silver	Bronze
60 m (36 contestants)	"The return of the king" Minhyuk (BtoB)	"Young because we learn" Baro (B1A4)	"Master out of power" Jota (Madtown)
4 × 100 m	"Who's the boss" Jimin (BTS); V (BTS); J-Hope (BTS); Jungkook (BTS)	"A day old puppy" Wonwoo (Seventeen); Mingyu (Seventeen); Jeonghan (Seventeen); S.Coups (Seventeen)	"Young because we learn" Baro (B1A4); Sandeul (B1A4); Jinyoung (B1A4); Gongchan (B1A4)

Futsal

Event	Gold	Silver	Bronze
Futsal	Goaldae-Sliga	Real Mak-Dribble	

Basketball

Event	Gold	Silver	Bronze
Basketball	Gangnam Lakers	Shoot-Hago-bulls	

=== Women ===
Athletics

Event	Gold	Silver	Bronze
60 m (36 contestants)	"Yeo-vengers"; Gaeun (Dal Shabet)	"Yeo-vengers"; Goo Hara (Kara)	"Young because we learn" Binnie (Oh My Girl)
4 × 100 m	"Yeo-vengers"; Hani (EXID); Solji (EXID); Hyelin (EXID); Junghwa (EXID)	"Young because we learn" Binnie (Oh My Girl); Jiho (Oh My Girl); Hyojung (Oh My Girl); YooA (Oh My Girl)	

Ssireum

Event	Gold	Silver	Bronze
Women's team	"Young because we learn" Park Gyeong-ree (Nine Muses); Son Sungah (Nine Muses); Jo Sojin (Nine Muses)	"The return of the king" Bomi (Apink); Hayoung (Apink); Namjoo (Apink)	

Archery

Event	Gold	Silver	Bronze
Women's team	"A day old puppy" Moonbyul (Mamamoo); Hwasa (Mamamoo); Wheein (Mamamoo)	"World"; Fei (Miss A); Sorn (singer) (CLC); Shannon	

== Ratings ==
Episode #	Original broadcast date	TNmS Ratings		AGB Nielsen Ratings	
Episode #	Original broadcast date	Nationwide	Seoul National Capital Area	Nationwide	Seoul National Capital Area
1	September 28, 2015	8.6%	9.8%	9.2%	10.4%
2	September 29, 2015	8.6%	%	9.9%	11.1%
