= The Unit: Idol Rebooting Project =

South Korean survival reality show

- Genre: Reality show
- Created by: KBS Variety Production
- Directed by: Park Ji-yeong; Won Seung-yeon; Son Su-hee; Shim Jae-hyeon; Bang Keul-i; Choi Ji-na; Seo Yong-su
- Presented by: Rain
- Opening theme: "My Turn" by THE UNI+
- Country of origin: South Korea
- Original language: Korean
- No. of episodes: 28 (Note: In order to circumvent Korean laws that prevent commercial breaks in the middle of an episode, what would previously have been aired as single 120 minute episodes are now being repackaged as two 60 minute episodes, with two episodes being shown each night with a commercial break between the two.) + 2 special episodes

Production
- Executive producers: Han Kyeong-cheon; Kim Kwang-Soo
- Running time: 60 minutes
- Production companies: KBS Variety Production; The Unit: Idol Rebooting Project Culture Industry Company

Original release
- Network: KBS2
- Release: October 28, 2017 – February 10, 2018

Idol Rebooting Project: The Unit (Korean: 아이돌 리부팅 프로젝트 더 유닛) is a South Korean survival reality show on KBS2. The concept of the show is to form male and female unit groups of nine members each, among idols who had already debuted. The show is aiming to give them a fair chance to demonstrate their talents that they may not have been able to showcase before.

== Overview ==
KBS announced in July 2017 that they had started production of a reality show under the working title The Final 99 Match. On August 2, the show's first teaser was released under the new title The Unit, stylized as The Uni+, which stands for "You and I Plus". The show also launched its official website on the same day along with application forms available for any idols interested in joining to fill in and submit, as well as a bulletin board wherein idol recommendations from anyone can be submitted.

=== Booting Evaluations ===
During the Booting Evaluations, members of the audience vote while the contestants perform. The contestants will receive 1 Boot when 15% of the audience votes for them. When 90% of the audience vote for the contestants, which is known as "Super Boot", the whole group will be able to join the show immediately. If the contestants do not receive a "Super Boot", the Mentors will determine whether to pass each performer or not. Contestants who receive at least 1 boot from any of the mentors will be able to join the show. The Booting Evaluations were held at the Kintex Hall 9 in Ilsan between September 29 and October 1, 2017.

=== Theme Song ===
It was reported that 126 contestants who passed the Booting Evaluations started filming a music video from October 7 to October 9 as part of a mission. The center group would consist of nine males and nine females, and the most stand-out contestant would be the "center of the center". On October 13, The Unit dropped the music video for the competitors' first challenge "My Turn", which also aired on that day on KBS's Music Bank, featuring Sonamoo's Euijin and IM's Kijoong as the girls' and boys' center respectively.

=== Voting ===
The Unit opened up voting at 10 p.m. KST on November 11, and servers crashed approximately 15 minutes later as people rushed to place their votes. Voting for the show would be exclusively done through TMON's website, with only one vote for each TMON ID. Anyone who supported the 126 contestants could participate. Each person would choose nine male contestants to form their own "Uni+ B" and nine female contestants to form "Uni+ G". Within their top nine choices, the voters would pick their favorite contestant, who would be awarded two votes while the remaining eight would receive one vote. This would mean that each voter would be able to help out a total of 18 contestants to achieve their dreams.

From Episode 11 onward, the voting system underwent a major change. It was announced that the voting would be exclusively done through The Unit official mobile app. Each person would pick only three contestants from "Uni+ B" and "Uni+ G" and was allowed to vote only once per day. The voting period started from 12 p.m KST on 7 January and would be closed at 11.59 p.m KST on 25 January 2018.

=== Post The Unit ===
On February 24's broadcast of The Unit's "Special Show", it was announced that UNI+ B's band name will be UNB and UNI+ G's band name will be UNI.T.

== Mentors ==
- Rain (MC)
- Lee Tae-min (Performance)
- Hyuna (Performance)
- Jo Hyun-ah (Vocals)
- Hwang Chi-yeul (Vocals)
- San E (Rap/MC)

== Booting Evaluations ==
Color key

✔	Mentor who had given a Boot
	Artist received a Super Boot
	Artist received Boots from all of the Mentors
	Artist did not receive any Boots
	Artist who did not receive any Boots, but selected to join The Unit

Note: Mentor votes for some artists were not indicated. The number of boots are shown instead. For some artists, the number of boots were retrieved from the show's official site.

=== Episode 1 (October 28) ===
Order	Artist	Debut Group	Song	Audience Boots	Mentor Boots					
Order	Artist	Debut Group	Song	Audience Boots	Chi-yeul	Hyuna	Rain	Taemin	Hyun-ah	San E (Note: Kim Hwa-young represented San E in some of the performances.)
1	Heejin	Good Day	"Into the New World"	4	✔	✔	—	✔	✔	—
1	Jiwon	Good Day	"Into the New World"	4	✔	—	✔	✔	✔	✔
1	Chaesol	Good Day	"Into the New World"	4	—	—	✔	—	—	—
1	Viva	Good Day	"Into the New World"	4	Received 3 boots					
1	Genie	Good Day	"Into the New World"	4	Received 2 boots					
1	Lucky	Good Day	"Into the New World"	4	—	—	—	—	—	—
2	Chan	A.C.E	"Don't Wanna Know"	3	✔	—	✔	—	✔	✔
2	Jun	A.C.E	"Don't Wanna Know"	3	✔	—	✔	—	✔	✔
3	Lee Hyunjoo	April	"Pretty Girl"	5	✔	✔	✔	✔	✔	✔
4	Jun	U-KISS	"Dang Dang Dang"	Super Boot	No evaluation					
5	Yujeong	Brave Girls	"Irony"	3	Received 5 boots					
5	Eunji	Brave Girls	"Irony"	3	Received 1 boot					
5	Yuna	Brave Girls	"Irony"	3	—	—	—	—	—	—
6	Hyeyeon	Bestie	"Only Wanna Give It to You"	3	—	—	✔	—	—	—
7	ZN	Laboum	"Come On Over Baby"	3	Received 3 boots					
7	Yujeong	Laboum	"Come On Over Baby"	3	Received 4 boots					
7	Haein	Laboum	"Come On Over Baby"	3	Received 5 boots					
8	Woohee	Dal Shabet	"Lady Marmalade"	4	✔	✔	✔	✔	✔	✔
8	Serri	Dal Shabet	"Lady Marmalade"	4	✔	✔	✔	✔	✔	✔
9	Han Areum	T-ara	"Day and Night"	3	✔	✔	—	—	—	—
10	Im Junhyeok	Day6	"In Front of Your House"	4	✔	—	✔	✔	✔	—
11	Siyoon	Paran	Self-written rap	0	—	—	—	—	—	—
12	Feeldog	Big Star	"Flower Road"	4	✔	✔	✔	✔	✔	✔
12	Jude	Big Star	"Flower Road"	4	—	✔	✔	—	—	✔
12	Sunghak	Big Star	"Flower Road"	4	—	✔	✔	✔	—	—
12	Raehwan	Big Star	"Flower Road"	4	—	✔	—	—	✔	—
13	Lee Jungha	Actor	"What's Going On"	2	—	✔	✔	—	✔	✔
14	Lee Juhyeon	Cube Entertainment Trainee	"Valenti"	4	✔	✔	✔	✔	✔	✔
15	Yang Jiwon	Spica	"Tonight"	Super Boot	No evaluation					

=== Episode 2 (November 4) ===
Order	Artist	Debut Group	Song	Audience Boots	Mentor Boots					
Order	Artist	Debut Group	Song	Audience Boots	Chi-yeul	Hyuna	Rain	Taemin	Hyun-ah	San E
1	Daewon	Madtown	"Who You?"	3	✔	—	—	—	—	—
1	Lee Geon	Madtown	"Who You?"	3	✔	✔	✔	✔	✔	✔
2	Somyi	DIA	"Happiness"	4	Received 3 boots					
2	Yebin	DIA	"Happiness"	4	Received 3 boots					
3	Euijin	Sonamoo	"Bubble Pop"	4	✔	✔	✔	✔	—	—
4	Donghyun	Boyfriend	"Pop"	4	✔	✔	✔	✔	✔	✔
4	Kwangmin	Boyfriend	"Pop"	4	—	—	—	—	—	—
4	Minwoo	Boyfriend	"Pop"	4	—	—	—	—	—	—
4	Jeongmin	Boyfriend	"Pop"	4	—	—	—	—	—	—
5	Rockhyun	100%	""O"-Jung.Ban.Hap."	4	✔	✔	✔	✔	✔	✔
5	Minwoo	100%	""O"-Jung.Ban.Hap."	4	—	—	—	—	—	—
5	Junghwan	100%	""O"-Jung.Ban.Hap."	4	—	—	—	—	—	—
5	Chanyong	100%	""O"-Jung.Ban.Hap."	4	—	—	—	—	—	—
5	Hyukjin	100%	""O"-Jung.Ban.Hap."	4	—	—	—	—	—	—
6	Yeoeun	Melody Day	"Twinkle"	Super Boot	No evaluation					
6	Chahee	Melody Day	"Twinkle"	Super Boot	No evaluation					
6	Yoomin	Melody Day	"Twinkle"	Super Boot	No evaluation					
7	Zett	AFOS	Unknown	—	—	—	—	—	—	—
7	Trigga	AFOS	Unknown	—	—	—	—	—	—	—
8	Lee Min-woo	C-Clown	Unknown	—	—	—	—	—	—	—
9	Kim Hyun-jae	BLACK6IX	Unknown	1	—	—	—	—	—	—
10	Jin	MVP	"Hard Carry"	3	Received 1 boot					
10	Rayoon	MVP	"Hard Carry"	3	Received 5 boots					
10	PK	MVP	"Hard Carry"	3	Received 5 boots					
10	Gi Taek	MVP	"Hard Carry"	3	—	—	—	—	—	—
10	Kang Han	MVP	"Hard Carry"	3	—	—	—	—	—	—
10	Been	MVP	"Hard Carry"	3	—	—	—	—	—	—
10	Sion	MVP	"Hard Carry"	3	—	—	—	—	—	—
11	Joo	Soloist	"The Face I Miss"	4	✔	✔	✔	✔	✔	✔
12	Kanto	Troy	"Boogie On & On"	5	✔	✔	✔	✔	✔	✔
12	Kang Minhee	Miss $	"Boogie On & On"	5	Received 4 boots					
13	Ryu Philip	SoReal	"Because You're My Girl"	Unknown	—	—	—	—	—	—
14	Seol Hayoon	Soloist	"Heart Attack"	1	✔	✔	✔	✔	✔	✔
15	Giseok	IM	"Very Nice"	Super Boot	No evaluation					
15	Taeeun	IM	"Very Nice"	Super Boot	No evaluation					
15	Hangyul	IM	"Very Nice"	Super Boot	No evaluation					
15	Kijoong	IM	"Very Nice"	Super Boot	No evaluation					
16	Janey	GP Basic	"Change"	3	—	✔	✔	✔	✔	✔
17	Shin Jihoon	Soloist	"Uphill Road"	4	—	✔	—	✔	✔	✔
18	Euna Kim	The Ark	"Blue Moon"	5	✔	✔	—	✔	✔	✔
19	Lee Suji	The Ark	"Flight From Paris"	4	✔	✔	—	✔	✔	✔
20	Marco	Hot Blood Youth (H.B.Y)	"Nillili Mambo"	5	✔	✔	✔	✔	✔	✔
20	Kyuhyuck	Hot Blood Youth (H.B.Y)	"Nillili Mambo"	5	—	—	—	—	—	—
20	Taro	Hot Blood Youth (H.B.Y)	"Nillili Mambo"	5	—	—	—	—	—	—
20	Bin	Hot Blood Youth (H.B.Y)	"Nillili Mambo"	5	—	—	—	—	—	—
20	Jisan	Hot Blood Youth (H.B.Y)	"Nillili Mambo"	5	—	—	—	—	—	—
21	Sungjun	Boys Republic	"Overdose"	5	Received 2 boots					
21	Minsu	Boys Republic	"Overdose"	5	—	—	—	—	—	—
21	Sunwoo	Boys Republic	"Overdose"	5	—	—	—	—	—	—
21	Onejunn	Boys Republic	"Overdose"	5	Received 2 boots					
21	Suwoong	Boys Republic	"Overdose"	5	Received 2 boots					
22	Kim Timoteo	Hotshot	"Ko Ko Bop"	Super Boot	No evaluation					
22	Go Hojung	Hotshot	"Ko Ko Bop"	Super Boot	No evaluation					

=== Episode 3 (November 11) ===
Order	Artist	Debut Group	Song	Audience Boots	Mentor Boots					
Order	Artist	Debut Group	Song	Audience Boots	Chi-yeul	Hyuna	Rain	Taemin	Hyun-ah	San E
1	Saebyeol	Matilda	"Show Me How You Burlesque"	5	—	—	—	✔	—	✔
1	Dan-A	Matilda	"Show Me How You Burlesque"	5	—	—	✔	✔	✔	✔
1	Semmi	Matilda	"Show Me How You Burlesque"	5	✔	✔	✔	—	—	✔
1	Haena	Matilda	"Show Me How You Burlesque"	5	✔	—	—	✔	✔	—
2	Euijin	BIGFLO	"Apology"	3	Received 5 boots					
2	Lex	BIGFLO	"Apology"	3	—	—	—	—	—	—
2	Ron	BIGFLO	"Apology"	3	—	—	—	—	—	—
2	Sungmin	BIGFLO	"Apology"	3	—	—	—	—	—	—
2	HighTop	BIGFLO	"Apology"	3	—	—	—	—	—	—
3	Seungjin	A-JAX	"Boom Boom"	Super Boot	No Evaluation					
3	Joonghee	A-JAX	"Boom Boom"	Super Boot	No Evaluation					
4	Jungsang	A.cian	"B-Day"	3	Received 4 boots					
4	Jin.O	A.cian	"B-Day"	3	—	—	—	—	—	—
5	Gunwoo	Myname	"Breath"	4	Received 3 boots					
5	Chaejin	Myname	"Breath"	4	Received 4 boots					
5	Jun.Q	Myname	"Breath"	4	Received 4 boots					
5	Seyong	Myname	"Breath"	4	Received 5 boots					
6	Gunmin	B.I.G	"Yeah!"	4	—	—	—	—	—	—
6	Heedo	B.I.G	"Yeah!"	4	Received 3 boots					
7	Sangil	Snuper	"Just Right"	5	Received 2 boots					
7	Woosung	Snuper	"Just Right"	5	—	—	—	—	—	—
7	Sebin	Snuper	"Just Right"	5	Received 1 boot					
7	Suhyun	Snuper	"Just Right"	5	Received 2 boots					
8	Taeho	Imfact	"You're The Best"	Unknown	Received 2 boots					
8	Ungjae	Imfact	"You're The Best"	Unknown	Received 4 boots					
8	Jian	Imfact	"You're The Best"	Unknown	Received 2 boots					
8	Jeup	Imfact	"You're The Best"	Unknown	Received 1 boot					
9	Yonghoon	MAS	"Kissing Strangers"	4	Received 2 boots					
9	Harin	MAS	"Kissing Strangers"	4	Received 2 boots					
9	Kanghyun	MAS	"Kissing Strangers"	4	Received 2 boots					
9	Dongmyeong	MAS	"Kissing Strangers"	4	Received 2 boots					
9	Cya	MAS	"Kissing Strangers"	4	Received 2 boots					
10	Park Jiwon	Park Sisters	"Chandelier"	Unknown	✔	✔	✔	✔	✔	✔
11	Lee Borim	Actor	"Sweet Dreams"	Unknown	Received 4 boots					
12	Mint	Tiny-G	"Already Go Lady"	2	Received 4 boots					
13	Kwon Haseo	Real Girls Project	"You, Clouds, Rain"	Unknown	Received 4 boots					
14	Yena	G-reyish	"So Hot"	Unknown	✔	✔	✔	✔	✔	✔
15	Kim	Rubber Soul	"MOMMAE"	3	✔	✔	✔	✔	✔	✔
16	Hyosun	H.U.B	"CRZY"	3	—	—	—	✔	✔	✔
17	NC.A	Soloist	"Watch Memories"	Super Boot	No evaluation					
18	Ji Hansol	Trainee	"Goodbye"	Super Boot	No evaluation					

=== Unaired Performances ===
Order	Artist	Debut Group	Song	Audience Boots	Mentor Boots					
Order	Artist	Debut Group	Song	Audience Boots	Chi-yeul	Hyuna	Rain	Taemin	Hyun-ah	San E
1	Jungha	Beatwin	"A Real Lady"	3	Received 1 boot					
2	Bomi	ACEMAX-RED	"Blood Sweat & Tears"	3	✔	✔	✔	✔	✔	✔
2	Lena	ACEMAX-RED	"Blood Sweat & Tears"	3	Received 1 boot					
2	Kaga	ACEMAX-RED	"Blood Sweat & Tears"	3	—	—	—	—	—	—
2	Angela	ACEMAX-RED	"Blood Sweat & Tears"	3	—	—	—	—	—	—
2	Jennifer	ACEMAX-RED	"Blood Sweat & Tears"	3	—	—	—	—	—	—
3	Casper	Cross Gene	"All of Me"	4	✔	✔	✔	✔	✔	✔
4	Kyeongha	TOPSECRET	Let's Get It Started	4	Received 5 boots					
4	Junghoon	TOPSECRET	Let's Get It Started	4	Received 3 boots					
4	Ain	TOPSECRET	Let's Get It Started	4	—	—	—	—	—	—
4	Yohan	TOPSECRET	Let's Get It Started	4	—	—	—	—	—	—
4	Yonghyeon	TOPSECRET	Let's Get It Started	4	—	—	—	—	—	—
4	K	TOPSECRET	Let's Get It Started	4	—	—	—	—	—	—
5	B-Joo	Topp Dogg	"Everybody"	5	Received 3 boots					
5	Hojoon	Topp Dogg	"Everybody"	5	Received 1 boot					
5	Sangdo	Topp Dogg	"Everybody"	5	—	—	—	—	—	—
5	Yano	Topp Dogg	"Everybody"	5	—	—	—	—	—	—
5	Xero	Topp Dogg	"Everybody"	5	—	—	—	—	—	—
6	Sejun	Speed	"Zero For Conduct"	3	Received 2 boots					
6	Oh Seungri	Speed	"Zero For Conduct"	3	—	—	—	—	—	—
7	Z-Uk	Bigflo	"Fear"	2	Received 2 boots					
8	Seongho	Beatwin	"Don't Flirt"	3	Received 1 boot					
9	Dabin	BabyBoo	"MTBD (Mental Breakdown)"	4	✔	✔	✔	✔	✔	✔
10	Soya	Soya n Sun	"Firework"	5	✔	✔	✔	✔	✔	✔
11	I	Soloist	"Atlantis Princess + Dessert"	4	✔	✔	✔	✔	✔	✔
12	Chaewon	S2	"Push Push"	2	✔	✔	✔	✔	✔	✔
12	Yujeong	S2	"Push Push"	2	Received 1 boot					
12	Dohee	S2	"Push Push"	2	—	—	—	—	—	—
12	Sua	S2	"Push Push"	2	—	—	—	—	—	—
12	Soyul	S2	"Push Push"	2	—	—	—	—	—	—
12	Jua	S2	"Push Push"	2	—	—	—	—	—	—
13	Nari	Wa$$up	"Bitch Better Have My Money"	1	✔	✔	✔	✔	✔	✔
13	Jiae	Wa$$up	"Bitch Better Have My Money"	1	—	—	—	—	—	—
14	Anne	S.I.S	"Glass Bead"	3	Received 5 boots					
14	Gaeul	S.I.S	"Glass Bead"	3	Received 2 boots					
14	Dal	S.I.S	"Glass Bead"	3	—	—	—	—	—	—
14	Minzy	S.I.S	"Glass Bead"	3	—	—	—	—	—	—
14	Sebin	S.I.S	"Glass Bead"	3	—	—	—	—	—	—
14	J.Sun	S.I.S	"Glass Bead"	3	—	—	—	—	—	—
15	Yuji	APPLE.B	"Dumb Dumb"	3	Received 3 boots					
15	Sandy	APPLE.B	"Dumb Dumb"	3	Received 2 boots					
15	Haeun	APPLE.B	"Dumb Dumb"	3	—	—	—	—	—	—
16	Yeseul	Wings	"Mr. Ambiguous"	4	Received 3 boots					
16	Nayoung	Wings	"Mr. Ambiguous"	4	—	—	—	—	—	—
17	Han Seoin	The SeeYa	Bloom	2	Received 2 boots					
18	Hanbi	LipBubble	"I Got You"	Unknown	Received 2 boots					
18	Eunbyeol	LipBubble	"I Got You"	Unknown	—	—	—	—	—	—
19	Yoonjo	Hello Venus	"Galaxy"	3	—	—	—	—	—	—
20	Soon.E	S.E.T	"One Night Only"	Unknown	—	—	—	—	—	—
20	Eun.E	S.E.T	"One Night Only"	Unknown	—	—	—	—	—	—
20	Tae.E	S.E.T	"One Night Only"	Unknown	—	—	—	—	—	—

== Top 9 ==
Color key

New Top 9

=== First voting period ===
#	Episode 4		Episode 5		Episode 7	
#	UNI+ B	UNI+ G	UNI+ B	UNI+ G	UNI+ B	UNI+ G
1	Kim Timoteo (Hotshot)	Yang Jiwon	Kim Timoteo (Hotshot) =	Yang Jiwon =	Kim Timoteo (Hotshot) =	Yang Jiwon =
2	Donghyun (Boyfriend)	Yebin (DIA)	Donghyun (Boyfriend) =	Euijin (Sonamoo) ↑3	Jun (U-Kiss) ↑1	Euijin (Sonamoo) =
3	Feeldog (Bigstar)	Euna Kim	Jun (U-Kiss) ↑3	Yebin (DIA) ↓1	Donghyun (Boyfriend) ↓1	Yebin (DIA) =
4	Go Hojung (Hotshot)	NC.A	Feeldog (Bigstar) ↓1	Euna Kim ↓1	Feeldog (Bigstar) =	NC.A ↑1
5	Ji Hansol	Euijin (Sonamoo)	Go Hojung (Hotshot) ↓1	NC.A ↓1	Go Hojung (Hotshot) =	Euna Kim ↓1
6	Jun (U-Kiss)	Woohee (Dal Shabet)	Ji Hansol ↓1	Lee Hyunjoo ↑3	Kijoong (IM) ↑1	Woohee (Dal Shabet) ↑1
7	Kijoong (IM)	Hyosun (H.U.B)	Kijoong (IM) =	Woohee (Dal Shabet) ↓1	Ji Hansol ↓1	Lee Hyunjoo ↓1
8	Dongmyeong (MAS)	Joo	Rockhyun (100%) ↑3	Hyosun (H.U.B) ↓1	Daewon (Madtown) ↑1	Hyosun (H.U.B) =
9	Kanto (Troy)	Lee Hyunjoo	Daewon (Madtown) ↑4	Lee Suji ↑2	Euijin (Bigflo) ↑7	Lee Suji =

=== Second voting period ===
#	Episode 8		Episode 10			
#	UNI+ B	UNI+ G	UNI+ B		UNI+ G	
1	Jun (U.Kiss)↑1	Euijin (Sonamoo)↑1	Jun (U.Kiss) =	134,905	Euijin (Sonamoo) =	145,981
2	Donghyun (Boyfriend) ↑1	Yebin (DIA) ↑1	Euijin (Bigflo) ↑2	124,061	Yebin (DIA) =	113,830
3	Feeldog (Bigstar) ↑1	NC.A ↑1	Donghyun (Boyfriend) ↓1	122,412	NC.A =	112,116
4	Euijin (Bigflo) ↑5	Yang Jiwon ↓3	Feeldog (Bigstar) ↓1	107,586	Euna Kim ↑2	110,993
5	Kim Timoteo (Hotshot) ↓4	Lee Hyunjoo ↑2	Kim Timoteo (Hotshot) =	105,115	Yang Jiwon ↓1	104,819
6	Go Hojung (Hotshot) ↓1	Euna Kim ↓1	Go Hojung (Hotshot) =	100,178	Jiwon (Good Day) ↑2	81,097
7	Kijoong (IM) ↓1	Yoonjo ↑7	Kijoong (IM) =	94,051	Yoonjo =	80,980
8	Daewon (Madtown) =	Jiwon (Good Day) ↑2	Daewon (Madtown) =	82,335	Lee Hyunjoo ↓3	80,898
9	Kanto (Troy) ↑3	Lee Suji =	Jeup (Imfact) ↑4	79,489	Semmi (Matilda) ↑33	79,606

=== Third voting period ===
#	Episode 11		Episode 13			
#	UNI+ B	UNI+ G	UNI+ B		UNI+ G	
1	Euijin (Bigflo) ↑1	Euijin (Sonamoo) =	Jun (U.Kiss) ↑1	229,486	Euijin (Sonamoo) =	208,436
2	Jun (U.Kiss) ↓1	Yebin (DIA) =	Euijin (Bigflo) ↓1	200,196	Semmi (Matilda) ↑3	169,564
3	Kim Timoteo (Hotshot) ↑2	NC.A =	Go Hojung (Hotshot) ↑2	146,376	Yebin (DIA) ↓1	149,600
4	Feeldog (Bigstar) =	Yang Jiwon ↑1	Feeldog (Bigstar) =	133,294	NC.A ↓1	140,594
5	Go Hojung (Hotshot) ↑1	Semmi (Matilda) ↑4	Kim Timoteo (Hotshot) ↓2	129,296	Lee Suji ↑2	129,118
6	Donghyun (Boyfriend) ↓3	Euna Kim ↓2	Ji Hansol ↑6	88,010	Jiwon (Good Day) ↑2	128,460
7	Kijoong (IM) =	Lee Suji ↑3	Donghyun (Boyfriend) ↓1	84,850	Euna Kim ↓1	121,758
8	Jeup (Imfact) ↑1	Jiwon (Good Day) ↓2	Seyong (Myname) ↑1	84,778	Yang Jiwon ↓4	103,704
9	Seyong (Myname) ↑5	Lee Hyunjoo ↓1	Daewon (Madtown) ↑1	83,720	Woohee (Dal Shabet) ↑1	99,304

=== Final Top 9 ===
It was announced that the boy group would be called UNB and girl group to be called Uni.T.

#	Episode 14 (Finals)			
#	UNI+ B		UNI+ G	
1	Jun (U.KISS) =	165,302	Euijin (SONAMOO) =	108,066
2	Euijin (Bigflo) =	164,838	Yebin (DIA) ↑1	83,910
3	Go Hojung (Hotshot) =	90,510	NC.A ↑1	82,074
4	Feeldog (Bigstar) =	82,170	Yoonjo ↑8	78,519
5	Marco (H.B.Y) ↑11	81,606	Lee Hyunjoo ↑5	72,090
6	Ji Hansol =	78,504	Yang Jiwon ↑2	68,193
7	Daewon (Madtown) ↑2	77,886	Woohee (Dal Shabet) ↑2	66,054
8	Kijoong (IM) ↑2	77,337	ZN (Laboum) ↑3	61,023
9	Chan (A.C.E) ↑6	74,367	Lee Suji ↓4	60,954

== Elimination chart ==
Color Key

- Artist joins the Top 9
- Artist joins the Top 9 and become the final group UNB and UNI.T
- Artist receives immunity and ranks at Top 9
- Artist receives immunity and passes
- Artist is eliminated but is saved by immunity
- Artist is eliminated
- Artist left the show

=== Male Contestant ===
Name (UNI+ B)	Ranking									
Name (UNI+ B)	EP4	EP5	EP7	EP8	EP9 (Note: The episode only revealed the rankings of #10, #19, #28 and #37.)	EP10	EP11	EP12 (Note: The episode only revealed the rankings of #10 and #19.)	EP13	Final
Jun (U-KISS)	6	3	2	1		1	2		1	01 (UNB)
Euijin (BIGFLO)	17	16	9	4		2	1		2	02 (UNB)
Go Hojung (Hotshot)	4	5	5	6		6	5		3	03 (UNB)
Feeldog (BIGSTAR)	3	4	4	3		4	4		4	04 (UNB)
Marco (H.B.Y)	12	13	14	14		19	15		16	05 (UNB)
Ji Hansol	5	6	7	12	10	10	12		6	06 (UNB)
Daewon (MADTOWN)	13	9	8	8		8	10		9	07 (UNB)
Kijoong (IM)	7	7	6	7		7	7		10	08 (UNB)
Chan (A.C.E)	26	27	26	19		17	14		15	09 (UNB)
Kim Timoteo (Hotshot)	1	1	1	5		5	3		5	10
Jeup (Imfact)	40	22	10	13		9	8	10	11	11
Donghyun (Boyfriend)	2	2	3	2		3	6		7	12
Hangyul (IM)	35	30	28	21	19	18	19		13	13
Rockhyun (100%)	11	8	11	10		11	11		12	14
Suwoong (Boys Republic)	21	24	18	18		16	16	19	18	15
Dongmyeong (MAS)	8	10	16	16		13	13		14	16
Seyong (Myname)	10	12	13	11		14	9		8	17
Lee Geon (MADTOWN)	22	23	22	20		15	18		17	18
Lee Jungha	15	15	15	17		21	22		19	Eliminated
Kanto (Troy)	9	11	12	9		12	17		20	Eliminated
Jun (A.C.E)	30	28	25	25		23	20		21	Eliminated
Raehwan (BIGSTAR)	14	14	20	22		25	28		22	Eliminated
Giseok (IM)	19	20	23	26		29	21		23	Eliminated
Jun.Q (Myname)	16	18	17	15		20	25		24	Eliminated
B-Joo (Topp Dogg)	36	32	30	31		30	26		25	Eliminated
Ungjae (Imfact)	23	17	19	23		22	23		26	Eliminated
Taeho (Imfact)	47	45	42	36		26	24		27	Eliminated
Heedo (B.I.G)	33	35	35	29	28	28	27		28	Eliminated
Sungjun (Boys Republic)	41	34	36	44	37	31	30		29	Eliminated
Jungha (BEATWIN)	42	44	41	24		24	29		30	Eliminated
Rayoon (MVP)	39	37	33	27		27	31		31	Eliminated
Im Junhyeok	31	33	34	38		41	32		32	Eliminated
Gunmin (B.I.G)	25	26	24	30		32	Eliminated			
Sangil (Snuper)	37	40	39	35		33	Eliminated			
Hyukjin (100%)	20	19	21	28		34	Eliminated			
Jungsang (A.Cian)	28	31	32	39		35	Eliminated			
Gunwoo (Myname)	18	21	29	32		36	Eliminated			
Chaejin (Myname)	24	25	27	33		37	Eliminated			
Hojoon (Topp Dogg)	27	29	31	34		38	Eliminated			
Suhyun (Snuper)	44	43	43	40		39	Eliminated			
Taeeun (IM)	55	46	40	43		40	Eliminated			
Sunghak (BIGSTAR)	34	42	44	41		42	Eliminated			
Seungjin (A-JAX)	38	38	38	42		43	Eliminated			
Lex (BIGFLO)	49	53	45	45		44	Eliminated			
Casper	46	41	37	37		45	Eliminated			
Sebin (Snuper)	32	36	46	Eliminated						
Kyeongha (TopSecret)	29	39	47	Eliminated						
Jin.O (A.Cian)	61	49	48	Eliminated						
Jian (Imfact)	59	51	49	Eliminated						
Joonghee (A-JAX)	45	50	50	Eliminated						
Sejun	43	47	51	Eliminated						
Taro (H.B.Y)	57	54	52	Eliminated						
Jude (BIGSTAR)	51	55	53	Eliminated						
Harin (MAS)	50	52	54	Eliminated						
P.K (MVP)	52	57	55	Eliminated						
Z-Uk (BIGFLO)	63	60	56	Eliminated						
Onejunn (Boys Republic)	48	48	57	Eliminated						
Seongho (BEATWIN)	54	56	58	Eliminated						
Yonghoon (MAS)	58	58	59	Eliminated						
Cya (MAS)	60	59	60	Eliminated						
Kanghyun (MAS)	56	61	61	Eliminated						
Jin (MVP)	53	63	62	Eliminated						
Junghoon (TopSecret)	62	62	63	Eliminated						

=== Female Contestant ===
Name (UNI+ G)	Ranking									
Name (UNI+ G)	EP4	EP5	EP7	EP8	EP9	EP10	EP11	EP12	EP13	Final
Euijin (Sonamoo)	5	2	2	1		1	1		1	01 (UNI.T)
Yebin (DIA)	2	3	3	2		2	2		3	02 (UNI.T)
NC.A (Soloist)	4	5	4	3		3	3		4	03 (UNI.T)
Yoonjo (Hello Venus)	23	19	14	7		7	13		12	04 (UNI.T)
Lee Hyunjoo (April)	9	6	7	5		8	9	10	10	05 (UNI.T)
Yang Jiwon (Spica)	1	1	1	4		5	4		8	06 (UNI.T)
Woohee (Dal Shabet)	6	7	6	10		11	10		9	07 (UNI.T)
ZN (Laboum)	17	16	13	14		14	12		11	08 (UNI.T)
Lee Suji (The Ark)	11	9	9	9	10	10	7		5	09 (UNI.T)
Euna Kim (The Ark)	3	4	5	6		4	6		7	10
Jiwon (Good Day)	15	13	10	8		6	8		6	11
Somyi (DIA)	10	10	11	11		12	11		14	12
Semmi (Matilda)	49	53	42	29		9	5		2	13
Dan-A (Matilda)	28	26	23	37	37	30	14		13	14
Shin Jihoon (Soloist)	14	17	16	15		21	22		16	15
Chahee (Melody Day)	34	28	31	35		18	16		17	16
Lee Borim (Actress and Model)	44	25	17	16		16	24		18	17
Yeoeun (Melody Day)	18	18	15	12		13	15		15	18
Hyosun (H.U.B)	7	8	8	13		20	20		19	Eliminated
Yujeong (Laboum)	12	12	12	17	19	15	17		20	Eliminated
Nari (Wa$up)	21	15	22	27		27	25		21	Eliminated
Anne (S.I.S)	36	36	28	22	28	26	19	19	22	Eliminated
Serri (Dal Shabet)	13	29	32	30		28	29		23	Eliminated
Lucky (Good Day)	22	20	19	19		17	18		24	Eliminated
Lee Juhyeon (Trainee)	38	34	29	23		25	21		25	Eliminated
Haein (Laboum)	24	21	18	18		19	23		26	Eliminated
Hyeyeon (Bestie)	30	27	25	21		24	26		27	Eliminated
Heejin (Good Day)	37	42	39	36		31	28		28	Eliminated
Viva (Good Day)	52	47	40	24		29	30		29	Eliminated
Kim (Rubber Soul)	39	41	38	34		23	27		30	Eliminated
Yoomin (Melody Day)	32	23	24	31		22	31		31	Eliminated
Yena (G-reyish)	43	38	33	39		32	32		32	Eliminated
Joo (Soloist)	8	11	20	20		33	Eliminated			
Kang Minhee (Miss $)	20	31	34	33		34	Eliminated			
Seol Hayoon (Soloist)	16	14	21	25		35	Eliminated			
Kwon Haseo (RGP)	31	30	30	26		36	Eliminated			
Yujeong (Brave Girls)	33	32	26	32		37	Eliminated			
Mint (Tiny-G)	26	24	27	28		38	Eliminated			
Gaeul (S.I.S)	25	22	35	40		39	Eliminated			
Haena (Matilda)	46	48	52	41		40	Eliminated			
Yeseul (WINGS)	53	52	51	44		41	Eliminated			
Park Jiwon (Actress and Model)	42	44	41	43		42	Eliminated			
Janey (GP Basic)	35	40	36	38		43	Eliminated			
Han Areum (T-ara)	27	33	37	42		44	Eliminated			
Eun.E (S.E.T)	62	62	61	45		45	Eliminated			
Soya (Soloist)	29	35	46	Eliminated						
Lena (ACEMAX-RED)	48	39	47	Eliminated						
Eunji (Brave Girls)	41	37	48	Eliminated						
Genie (Good Day)	59	49	49	Eliminated						
Han Seoin (The SeeYa)	45	46	50	Eliminated						
Dabin (BabyBoo)	40	43	51	Eliminated						
Saebyeol (Matilda)	57	45	52	Eliminated						
Bomi (ACEMAX-RED)	54	51	53	Eliminated						
Hanbi (LipBubble)	56	57	54	Eliminated						
Yujeong (S2)	61	60	55	Eliminated						
Sebin (S.I.S)	47	50	56	Eliminated						
Sandy (Apple.B)	55	56	57	Eliminated						
Chaesol (Good Day)	50	54	58	Eliminated						
Yuji (Apple.B)	51	55	59	Eliminated						
Eunbyeol (LipBubble)	58	58	60	Eliminated						
Tae.E (S.E.T)	60	59	61	Eliminated						
Chaewon (S2)	63	61	62	Eliminated						
Cha Yunji (Soloist)	19	Left the show								

== First Mission: The Music Video ==
After the Booting Evaluations, the contestants were tasked to form groups of 9 for the first mission. The winning team for each gender will become the center team in the music video of the show's theme song "My Turn".

=== Uni+ B Evaluations ===
Team (Note: In order of presentation in Episode 6.)	Place	Members
Red	1	Kijoong (Center), Donghyun (Leader), Feeldog, Rockhyun, Kim Timoteo, Lee Geon, Ji Hansol, Kanto, Go Hojung
White	4	Jungha (Center), Daewon (Leader), Jian, Suhyun, Dongmyeong, Yonghoon, Cya, Kanghyun, Harin
Black	2	Jun (A.C.E) (Center and Leader), Chan, PK, Rayoon, Jin, Taeeun, Jungsang, Sangil, Im Junhyeok
Orange	7	Taeho (Center), Casper (Leader), Ungjae, Z-Uk, Chaejin, Jun.Q, Hyukjin, Lee Jungha, Marco
Yellow	3	Hangyul (Center), Raehwan (Leader), Sunghak, Gunmin, Sungjun, Suwoong, Sejun, Seongho, Jeup
Green	5	Jun (U-Kiss) (Center), Hojoon (Leader), B-Joo, Taro, Heedo, Lex, Jin.O, Seungjin, Joonghee
Blue	6	Seyong (Center and Leader), Gunwoo, Jude, Euijin, Onejunn, Kyeongha, Junghoon, Giseok, Sebin

=== Uni+ G Evaluations ===
Team	Place	Members
Black	3	Serri (Center), Yang Jiwon (Leader), Woohee, Nari, Yujeong (Laboum), ZN, Dan-A, Haena, Park Jiwon
Red	1	Euijin (Center), Eunji (Leader), Yebin, Somyi, Yeoeun, Chahee, Yoomin, Han Seoin, Lee Borim
Yellow	5	Yena (Center), Kang Minhee (Leader), Eunbyeol, Hanbi, Tae.E, Eun.E, Yujeong (S2), Heejin, Sebin
White	2	Anne (Center), Haein (Leader), Gaeul, Lee Suji, Euna Kim, Jiwon, Chaesol, Janey, Yujeong (Brave Girls)
Orange	7	Lee Hyunjoo (Center), Han Areum (Leader), Kim, Seol Hayoon, Mint, Dabin, Hyosun, Bomi, Lee Juhyeon
Green	4	Cha Yunji (Center), Hyeyeon (Leader), Yoonjo, NC.A, Chaewon, Saebyeol, Semmi, Genie, Viva
Blue	6	Sandy (Center), Joo (Leader), Yuji, Yeseul, Soya, Lena, Kwon Haseo, Lucky, Shin Jihoon

== Second Mission: Restart Mission ==
Contestants will choose one of the given songs of different concepts that they are confident in; new teams of nine are formed. Voting of each contestant is conducted during the performances. The winning team for each gender with the most votes will win a benefit of immunity from elimination after the end of the first voting round, regardless of current overall vote rankings in the show, plus the chance to perform in Rain's comeback stage.

=== UNI+ G (Episode 5) ===
Color key

- Leader
- Highest Score Overall

Order	Team	Song	Artist	Votes	Total	Result
1	Black	"Rough" by GFriend	NC.A	267	1,266	5th Place
1	Black	"Rough" by GFriend	Gaeul	161	1,266	5th Place
1	Black	"Rough" by GFriend	Shin Jihoon	142	1,266	5th Place
1	Black	"Rough" by GFriend	Chahee	141	1,266	5th Place
1	Black	"Rough" by GFriend	Lee Juhyeon	131	1,266	5th Place
1	Black	"Rough" by GFriend	Lee Hyunjoo	127	1,266	5th Place
1	Black	"Rough" by GFriend	Eunji	116	1,266	5th Place
1	Black	"Rough" by GFriend	Han Seoin	98	1,266	5th Place
1	Black	"Rough" by GFriend	Genie	83	1,266	5th Place
2	Blue	"Crazy" by 4Minute	Hyosun	273	1,635	2nd Place
2	Blue	"Crazy" by 4Minute	Euna Kim	223	1,635	2nd Place
2	Blue	"Crazy" by 4Minute	Nari	196	1,635	2nd Place
2	Blue	"Crazy" by 4Minute	Serri	183	1,635	2nd Place
2	Blue	"Crazy" by 4Minute	Dabin	171	1,635	2nd Place
2	Blue	"Crazy" by 4Minute	Mint	170	1,635	2nd Place
2	Blue	"Crazy" by 4Minute	Euijin	165	1,635	2nd Place
2	Blue	"Crazy" by 4Minute	Viva	146	1,635	2nd Place
2	Blue	"Crazy" by 4Minute	Saebyeol	108	1,635	2nd Place
3	Yellow	"Heart Attack" by AOA	Yoonjo	172	929	7th Place
3	Yellow	"Heart Attack" by AOA	Yoomin	159	929	7th Place
3	Yellow	"Heart Attack" by AOA	Somyi	122	929	7th Place
3	Yellow	"Heart Attack" by AOA	Lena	98	929	7th Place
3	Yellow	"Heart Attack" by AOA	Park Jiwon	88	929	7th Place
3	Yellow	"Heart Attack" by AOA	Yena	84	929	7th Place
3	Yellow	"Heart Attack" by AOA	Tae.E	80	929	7th Place
3	Yellow	"Heart Attack" by AOA	Yujeong (S2)	67	929	7th Place
3	Yellow	"Heart Attack" by AOA	Eunbyeol	59	929	7th Place
4	Orange	"Red Flavor" by Red Velvet	Jiwon	183	1,051	6th Place
4	Orange	"Red Flavor" by Red Velvet	Cha Yunji	159	1,051	6th Place
4	Orange	"Red Flavor" by Red Velvet	Yebin	151	1,051	6th Place
4	Orange	"Red Flavor" by Red Velvet	Lee Suji	137	1,051	6th Place
4	Orange	"Red Flavor" by Red Velvet	Yujeong (Brave Girls)	98	1,051	6th Place
4	Orange	"Red Flavor" by Red Velvet	Sebin	89	1,051	6th Place
4	Orange	"Red Flavor" by Red Velvet	Yuji	87	1,051	6th Place
4	Orange	"Red Flavor" by Red Velvet	Dan-A	78	1,051	6th Place
4	Orange	"Red Flavor" by Red Velvet	Lucky	69	1,051	6th Place
5	Green	"You're The Best" by Mamamoo	Yang Jiwon	302	1,947	1st Place
5	Green	"You're The Best" by Mamamoo	Eun.E	285	1,947	1st Place
5	Green	"You're The Best" by Mamamoo	Heejin	248	1,947	1st Place
5	Green	"You're The Best" by Mamamoo	Kang Minhee	223	1,947	1st Place
5	Green	"You're The Best" by Mamamoo	Haena	208	1,947	1st Place
5	Green	"You're The Best" by Mamamoo	Joo	191	1,947	1st Place
5	Green	"You're The Best" by Mamamoo	Hyeyeon	189	1,947	1st Place
5	Green	"You're The Best" by Mamamoo	Han Areum	152	1,947	1st Place
5	Green	"You're The Best" by Mamamoo	Yeseul	149	1,947	1st Place
6	White	"Give It to Me" by Sistar	Yeoeun	280	1,389	3rd Place
6	White	"Give It to Me" by Sistar	Seol Hayoon	208	1,389	3rd Place
6	White	"Give It to Me" by Sistar	Semmi	203	1,389	3rd Place
6	White	"Give It to Me" by Sistar	Chaewon	156	1,389	3rd Place
6	White	"Give It to Me" by Sistar	Kwon Haseo	150	1,389	3rd Place
6	White	"Give It to Me" by Sistar	Haein	147	1,389	3rd Place
6	White	"Give It to Me" by Sistar	Janey	118	1,389	3rd Place
6	White	"Give It to Me" by Sistar	Kim	82	1,389	3rd Place
6	White	"Give It to Me" by Sistar	Bomi	45	1,389	3rd Place
7	Red	"Gee" by Girls' Generation	Woohee	228	1,337	4th Place
7	Red	"Gee" by Girls' Generation	ZN	218	1,337	4th Place
7	Red	"Gee" by Girls' Generation	Yujeong (Laboum)	185	1,337	4th Place
7	Red	"Gee" by Girls' Generation	Soya	181	1,337	4th Place
7	Red	"Gee" by Girls' Generation	Chaesol	121	1,337	4th Place
7	Red	"Gee" by Girls' Generation	Anne	115	1,337	4th Place
7	Red	"Gee" by Girls' Generation	Lee Borim	113	1,337	4th Place
7	Red	"Gee" by Girls' Generation	Hanbi	112	1,337	4th Place
7	Red	"Gee" by Girls' Generation	Sandy	64	1,337	4th Place

=== UNI+ B (Episode 6) ===
Color key

- Leader
- Highest Score Overall

Order	Team	Song	Artist	Votes	Total	Result
1	White	"Fire" by BTS	Suwoong	246	1,247	2nd Place
1	White	"Fire" by BTS	Jun.Q	149	1,247	2nd Place
1	White	"Fire" by BTS	Sungjun	145	1,247	2nd Place
1	White	"Fire" by BTS	Hangyul	140	1,247	2nd Place
1	White	"Fire" by BTS	Ungjae	137	1,247	2nd Place
1	White	"Fire" by BTS	Taeeun	125	1,247	2nd Place
1	White	"Fire" by BTS	Jungsang	110	1,247	2nd Place
1	White	"Fire" by BTS	Taeho	100	1,247	2nd Place
1	White	"Fire" by BTS	Jude	95	1,247	2nd Place
2	Green	"Heartbeat" by 2PM	Seyong	220	1,199	4th Place
2	Green	"Heartbeat" by 2PM	Jungha	147	1,199	4th Place
2	Green	"Heartbeat" by 2PM	Sangil	145	1,199	4th Place
2	Green	"Heartbeat" by 2PM	Euijin	140	1,199	4th Place
2	Green	"Heartbeat" by 2PM	Sebin	135	1,199	4th Place
2	Green	"Heartbeat" by 2PM	Casper	117	1,199	4th Place
2	Green	"Heartbeat" by 2PM	Hyukjin	111	1,199	4th Place
2	Green	"Heartbeat" by 2PM	Gunwoo	97	1,199	4th Place
2	Green	"Heartbeat" by 2PM	Seongho	87	1,199	4th Place
3	Orange	"Monster" by EXO	Donghyun	222	1,438	1st Place
3	Orange	"Monster" by EXO	Kim Timoteo	166	1,438	1st Place
3	Orange	"Monster" by EXO	Raehwan	160	1,438	1st Place
3	Orange	"Monster" by EXO	Lee Geon	157	1,438	1st Place
3	Orange	"Monster" by EXO	Ji Hansol	157	1,438	1st Place
3	Orange	"Monster" by EXO	Jeup	150	1,438	1st Place
3	Orange	"Monster" by EXO	Gunmin	145	1,438	1st Place
3	Orange	"Monster" by EXO	Rockhyun	142	1,438	1st Place
3	Orange	"Monster" by EXO	Jun (A.C.E)	139	1,438	1st Place
4	Yellow	"Juliette" by Shinee	Kijoong	176	1,183	5th Place
4	Yellow	"Juliette" by Shinee	Marco	158	1,183	5th Place
4	Yellow	"Juliette" by Shinee	Chaejin	150	1,183	5th Place
4	Yellow	"Juliette" by Shinee	Go Hojung	146	1,183	5th Place
4	Yellow	"Juliette" by Shinee	Dongmyeong	146	1,183	5th Place
4	Yellow	"Juliette" by Shinee	Sunghak	108	1,183	5th Place
4	Yellow	"Juliette" by Shinee	Jin	104	1,183	5th Place
4	Yellow	"Juliette" by Shinee	Lex	101	1,183	5th Place
4	Yellow	"Juliette" by Shinee	Hojoon	94	1,183	5th Place
5	Red	"Perfect Man" by Shinhwa	Jun (U-Kiss)	224	1,232	3rd Place
5	Red	"Perfect Man" by Shinhwa	Chan	188	1,232	3rd Place
5	Red	"Perfect Man" by Shinhwa	Lee Jungha	162	1,232	3rd Place
5	Red	"Perfect Man" by Shinhwa	Rayoon	136	1,232	3rd Place
5	Red	"Perfect Man" by Shinhwa	Im Junhyeok	124	1,232	3rd Place
5	Red	"Perfect Man" by Shinhwa	Onejunn	113	1,232	3rd Place
5	Red	"Perfect Man" by Shinhwa	P.K	112	1,232	3rd Place
5	Red	"Perfect Man" by Shinhwa	Jin.O	108	1,232	3rd Place
5	Red	"Perfect Man" by Shinhwa	Harin	65	1,232	3rd Place
6	Black	"Boom Boom" by Seventeen	Feeldog	241	1,138	6th Place
6	Black	"Boom Boom" by Seventeen	Giseok	130	1,138	6th Place
6	Black	"Boom Boom" by Seventeen	Seungjin	125	1,138	6th Place
6	Black	"Boom Boom" by Seventeen	Daewon	124	1,138	6th Place
6	Black	"Boom Boom" by Seventeen	B-Joo	124	1,138	6th Place
6	Black	"Boom Boom" by Seventeen	Joonghee	109	1,138	6th Place
6	Black	"Boom Boom" by Seventeen	Heedo	107	1,138	6th Place
6	Black	"Boom Boom" by Seventeen	Kyeongha	100	1,138	6th Place
6	Black	"Boom Boom" by Seventeen	Jian	78	1,138	6th Place
7	Blue	"H.E.R" by Block B	Kanto	214	1,044	7th Place
7	Blue	"H.E.R" by Block B	Suhyun	125	1,044	7th Place
7	Blue	"H.E.R" by Block B	Taro	124	1,044	7th Place
7	Blue	"H.E.R" by Block B	Sejun	122	1,044	7th Place
7	Blue	"H.E.R" by Block B	Z-Uk	101	1,044	7th Place
7	Blue	"H.E.R" by Block B	Yonghoon	96	1,044	7th Place
7	Blue	"H.E.R" by Block B	Junghoon	90	1,044	7th Place
7	Blue	"H.E.R" by Block B	Cya	88	1,044	7th Place
7	Blue	"H.E.R" by Block B	Kanghyun	84	1,044	7th Place

== Third Mission: Self-producing ==
Contestants will be grouped by the mentors based on the following categories: Vocal, Rap-Vocal and Performance. All performances are self-arranged by the contestants themselves, with live band accompaniments for the Vocal and Rap-Vocal categories. The mission will be based on a rival match basis. Voting of each contestant is conducted during the performances. The top 3 members of the winning category team for each gender will win a benefit of immunity from elimination at the end of the 2nd voting round, regardless of current overall vote rankings in the show.

Color key

- Leader
- Winning Team

Episode	Order	Category	Individual Rank	Song	Artists				Song
Episode	Order	Category	Individual Rank	Song	Winning Team		Losing Team		Song
Episode 8 (Saturday, December 16)	1	Vocal; UNI+ B	1st	"U R" by Taeyeon	Rockhyun	Yellow (321 votes)	Green (317 votes)	Jeup	"Miracles in December" by EXO
Episode 8 (Saturday, December 16)	1	Vocal; UNI+ B	2nd	"U R" by Taeyeon	Dongmyeong	Yellow (321 votes)	Green (317 votes)	Lee Geon	"Miracles in December" by EXO
Episode 8 (Saturday, December 16)	1	Vocal; UNI+ B	3rd	"U R" by Taeyeon	Im Junhyeok	Yellow (321 votes)	Green (317 votes)	Hyukjin	"Miracles in December" by EXO
Episode 8 (Saturday, December 16)	1	Vocal; UNI+ B	4th	"U R" by Taeyeon	Lex	Yellow (321 votes)	Green (317 votes)	Chaejin	"Miracles in December" by EXO
Episode 8 (Saturday, December 16)	1	Vocal; UNI+ B	5th	"U R" by Taeyeon	Taeho	Yellow (321 votes)	Green (317 votes)	Jungsang	"Miracles in December" by EXO
Episode 8 (Saturday, December 16)	1	Vocal; UNI+ B	6th	"U R" by Taeyeon	Suhyun	Yellow (321 votes)	Green (317 votes)	Sangil	"Miracles in December" by EXO
Episode 8 (Saturday, December 16)	2	Rap-Vocal; UNI+ G	1st	"Who's Your Mama?" by Park Jin-young featuring Jessi	Euna Kim	Orange (383 votes)	Blue (154 votes)	Chahee	"Blood Sweat & Tears" by BTS
Episode 8 (Saturday, December 16)	2	Rap-Vocal; UNI+ G	2nd	"Who's Your Mama?" by Park Jin-young featuring Jessi	Semmi	Orange (383 votes)	Blue (154 votes)	Kwon Haseo	"Blood Sweat & Tears" by BTS
Episode 8 (Saturday, December 16)	2	Rap-Vocal; UNI+ G	3rd	"Who's Your Mama?" by Park Jin-young featuring Jessi	Somyi	Orange (383 votes)	Blue (154 votes)	Janey	"Blood Sweat & Tears" by BTS
Episode 8 (Saturday, December 16)	2	Rap-Vocal; UNI+ G	4th	"Who's Your Mama?" by Park Jin-young featuring Jessi	Jiwon	Orange (383 votes)	Blue (154 votes)	Joo	"Blood Sweat & Tears" by BTS
Episode 8 (Saturday, December 16)	2	Rap-Vocal; UNI+ G	5th	"Who's Your Mama?" by Park Jin-young featuring Jessi	Yang Jiwon	Orange (383 votes)	Blue (154 votes)	Yujeong (Brave Girls)	"Blood Sweat & Tears" by BTS
Episode 8 (Saturday, December 16)	2	Rap-Vocal; UNI+ G	6th	"Who's Your Mama?" by Park Jin-young featuring Jessi	Kim	Orange (383 votes)	Blue (154 votes)	Han Areum	"Blood Sweat & Tears" by BTS
Episode 8 (Saturday, December 16)	2	Rap-Vocal; UNI+ G	7th	"Who's Your Mama?" by Park Jin-young featuring Jessi	Yoonjo	Orange (383 votes)	—N/a		
Episode 8 (Saturday, December 16)	2	Rap-Vocal; UNI+ G	8th	"Who's Your Mama?" by Park Jin-young featuring Jessi	Yoomin	Orange (383 votes)	—N/a		
Episode 8 (Saturday, December 16)	2	Rap-Vocal; UNI+ G	9th	"Who's Your Mama?" by Park Jin-young featuring Jessi	Yeseul	Orange (383 votes)	—N/a		
Episode 8 (Saturday, December 16)	3	Performance; UNI+ B	1st	"Stay" by Zedd and Alessia Cara + "Chained Up" by VIXX	Euijin	Black (315 votes)	Red (306 votes)	Seyong	"Manners Maketh Man" from Kingsman: The Secret Service soundtrack + "That's What I Like" by Bruno Mars
Episode 8 (Saturday, December 16)	3	Performance; UNI+ B	2nd	"Stay" by Zedd and Alessia Cara + "Chained Up" by VIXX	Ji Hansol	Black (315 votes)	Red (306 votes)	Feeldog	"Manners Maketh Man" from Kingsman: The Secret Service soundtrack + "That's What I Like" by Bruno Mars
Episode 8 (Saturday, December 16)	3	Performance; UNI+ B	3rd	"Stay" by Zedd and Alessia Cara + "Chained Up" by VIXX	Kim Timoteo	Black (315 votes)	Red (306 votes)	Go Hojung	"Manners Maketh Man" from Kingsman: The Secret Service soundtrack + "That's What I Like" by Bruno Mars
Episode 8 (Saturday, December 16)	3	Performance; UNI+ B	4th	"Stay" by Zedd and Alessia Cara + "Chained Up" by VIXX	Hangyul	Black (315 votes)	Red (306 votes)	Kijoong	"Manners Maketh Man" from Kingsman: The Secret Service soundtrack + "That's What I Like" by Bruno Mars
Episode 8 (Saturday, December 16)	3	Performance; UNI+ B	5th	"Stay" by Zedd and Alessia Cara + "Chained Up" by VIXX	B-Joo	Black (315 votes)	Red (306 votes)	Daewon	"Manners Maketh Man" from Kingsman: The Secret Service soundtrack + "That's What I Like" by Bruno Mars
Episode 8 (Saturday, December 16)	3	Performance; UNI+ B	6th	"Stay" by Zedd and Alessia Cara + "Chained Up" by VIXX	Sunghak	Black (315 votes)	Red (306 votes)	Jun (A.C.E)	"Manners Maketh Man" from Kingsman: The Secret Service soundtrack + "That's What I Like" by Bruno Mars
Episode 8 (Saturday, December 16)	3	Performance; UNI+ B	7th	"Stay" by Zedd and Alessia Cara + "Chained Up" by VIXX	Gunmin	Black (315 votes)	Red (306 votes)	Sungjun	"Manners Maketh Man" from Kingsman: The Secret Service soundtrack + "That's What I Like" by Bruno Mars
Episode 8 (Saturday, December 16)	3	Performance; UNI+ B	8th	"Stay" by Zedd and Alessia Cara + "Chained Up" by VIXX	Seungjin	Black (315 votes)	Red (306 votes)	Rayoon	"Manners Maketh Man" from Kingsman: The Secret Service soundtrack + "That's What I Like" by Bruno Mars
Episode 8 (Saturday, December 16)	3	Performance; UNI+ B	9th	"Stay" by Zedd and Alessia Cara + "Chained Up" by VIXX	Hojoon	Black (315 votes)	Red (306 votes)	Taeeun	"Manners Maketh Man" from Kingsman: The Secret Service soundtrack + "That's What I Like" by Bruno Mars
Episode 9 (Saturday, December 23)	4	Vocal; UNI+ G	1st	"Jackpot" by Block B + "LA SONG" by Rain	Heejin	Yellow (334 votes)	Green (290 votes)	NC.A	"Last Dance" by Big Bang
Episode 9 (Saturday, December 23)	4	Vocal; UNI+ G	2nd	"Jackpot" by Block B + "LA SONG" by Rain	Yeoeun	Yellow (334 votes)	Green (290 votes)	Haena	"Last Dance" by Big Bang
Episode 9 (Saturday, December 23)	4	Vocal; UNI+ G	3rd	"Jackpot" by Block B + "LA SONG" by Rain	Woohee	Yellow (334 votes)	Green (290 votes)	Yebin	"Last Dance" by Big Bang
Episode 9 (Saturday, December 23)	4	Vocal; UNI+ G	4th	"Jackpot" by Block B + "LA SONG" by Rain	Hyeyeon	Yellow (334 votes)	Green (290 votes)	Yujeong (Laboum)	"Last Dance" by Big Bang
Episode 9 (Saturday, December 23)	4	Vocal; UNI+ G	5th	"Jackpot" by Block B + "LA SONG" by Rain	Shin Jihoon	Yellow (334 votes)	Green (290 votes)	Lucky	"Last Dance" by Big Bang
Episode 9 (Saturday, December 23)	4	Vocal; UNI+ G	6th	—N/a			Green (290 votes)	Kang Minhee	"Last Dance" by Big Bang
Episode 9 (Saturday, December 23)	4	Vocal; UNI+ G	7th	—N/a			Green (290 votes)	Seol Hayoon	"Last Dance" by Big Bang
Episode 9 (Saturday, December 23)	4	Vocal; UNI+ G	8th	—N/a			Green (290 votes)	Eun.E	"Last Dance" by Big Bang
Episode 9 (Saturday, December 23)	4	Vocal; UNI+ G	9th	—N/a			Green (290 votes)	Gaeul	"Last Dance" by Big Bang
Episode 9 (Saturday, December 23)	5	Performance; UNI+ G	1st	"Problem" by Ariana Grande	Euijin	Black (337 votes)	Red (298 votes)	Hyosun	"Partition" + "Run The World" by Beyoncé
Episode 9 (Saturday, December 23)	5	Performance; UNI+ G	2nd	"Problem" by Ariana Grande	ZN	Black (337 votes)	Red (298 votes)	Nari	"Partition" + "Run The World" by Beyoncé
Episode 9 (Saturday, December 23)	5	Performance; UNI+ G	3rd	"Problem" by Ariana Grande	Lee Hyunjoo	Black (337 votes)	Red (298 votes)	Lee Suji	"Partition" + "Run The World" by Beyoncé
Episode 9 (Saturday, December 23)	5	Performance; UNI+ G	4th	"Problem" by Ariana Grande	Lee Borim	Black (337 votes)	Red (298 votes)	Anne	"Partition" + "Run The World" by Beyoncé
Episode 9 (Saturday, December 23)	5	Performance; UNI+ G	5th	"Problem" by Ariana Grande	Haein	Black (337 votes)	Red (298 votes)	Viva	"Partition" + "Run The World" by Beyoncé
Episode 9 (Saturday, December 23)	5	Performance; UNI+ G	6th	"Problem" by Ariana Grande	Dan-A	Black (337 votes)	Red (298 votes)	Mint	"Partition" + "Run The World" by Beyoncé
Episode 9 (Saturday, December 23)	5	Performance; UNI+ G	7th	"Problem" by Ariana Grande	Park Ji-won	Black (337 votes)	Red (298 votes)	Lee Juhyeon	"Partition" + "Run The World" by Beyoncé
Episode 9 (Saturday, December 23)	5	Performance; UNI+ G	8th	"Problem" by Ariana Grande	Yena	Black (337 votes)	—N/a		
Episode 9 (Saturday, December 23)	5	Performance; UNI+ G	9th	"Problem" by Ariana Grande	Serri	Black (337 votes)	—N/a		
Episode 9 (Saturday, December 23)	6	Rap-Vocal; UNI+ B	1st	"Butterfly" by BTS	Jun (U-Kiss)	Orange (291 votes)	Blue (282 votes)	Jungha	"Bermuda Triangle" by Zico featuring Dean, Crush + "Red Sun" by Hangzoo featuring Zico, Swings
Episode 9 (Saturday, December 23)	6	Rap-Vocal; UNI+ B	2nd	"Butterfly" by BTS	Suwoong	Orange (291 votes)	Blue (282 votes)	Chan	"Bermuda Triangle" by Zico featuring Dean, Crush + "Red Sun" by Hangzoo featuring Zico, Swings
Episode 9 (Saturday, December 23)	6	Rap-Vocal; UNI+ B	3rd	"Butterfly" by BTS	Casper	Orange (291 votes)	Blue (282 votes)	Donghyun	"Bermuda Triangle" by Zico featuring Dean, Crush + "Red Sun" by Hangzoo featuring Zico, Swings
Episode 9 (Saturday, December 23)	6	Rap-Vocal; UNI+ B	4th	"Butterfly" by BTS	Ungjae	Orange (291 votes)	Blue (282 votes)	Jun.Q	"Bermuda Triangle" by Zico featuring Dean, Crush + "Red Sun" by Hangzoo featuring Zico, Swings
Episode 9 (Saturday, December 23)	6	Rap-Vocal; UNI+ B	5th	"Butterfly" by BTS	Raehwan	Orange (291 votes)	Blue (282 votes)	Marco	"Bermuda Triangle" by Zico featuring Dean, Crush + "Red Sun" by Hangzoo featuring Zico, Swings
Episode 9 (Saturday, December 23)	6	Rap-Vocal; UNI+ B	6th	"Butterfly" by BTS	Heedo	Orange (291 votes)	Blue (282 votes)	Kanto	"Bermuda Triangle" by Zico featuring Dean, Crush + "Red Sun" by Hangzoo featuring Zico, Swings
Episode 9 (Saturday, December 23)	6	Rap-Vocal; UNI+ B	7th	"Butterfly" by BTS	Gunwoo	Orange (291 votes)	Blue (282 votes)	Lee Jungha	"Bermuda Triangle" by Zico featuring Dean, Crush + "Red Sun" by Hangzoo featuring Zico, Swings
Episode 9 (Saturday, December 23)	6	Rap-Vocal; UNI+ B	8th	"Butterfly" by BTS	Giseok	Orange (291 votes)	—N/a		

=== Overall Ranking ===
Color key

- Winning Team (Top 3 members in the team get immunity from elimination at the end of the 2nd voting round.)

Ranking	Team (UNI+ B Category)	Team (UNI+ G Category)
1st	Yellow (Vocal)	Orange (Rap-Vocal)
2nd	Green (Vocal)	Black (Performance)
3rd	Black (Performance)	Yellow (Vocal)
4th	Red (Performance)	Red (Performance)
5th	Orange (Rap-Vocal)	Green (Vocal)
6th	Blue (Rap-Vocal)	Blue (Rap-Vocal)

== Fourth Mission: Digital Singles Release ==
The remaining contestants after the 2nd Voting Announcement will form 5 groups for each gender, formed by the top 5 contestants from the Self-producing Mission. These formed groups will perform newly produced songs produced by reputable music producers, and these songs will be released as digital singles. Voting of each contestant is conducted during the performances. The winning team for each gender in this mission will have their songs labelled as title tracks in the single albums categorised by gender and the 2 songs' music videos will be directed by well-known directors Hong Won-ki and Lee Gi-taek. Plus, every contestant in the winning team will receive a benefit of additional online votes (1st placed contestant gets 10,000 additional votes, 2nd placed contestant gets 7,000 additional votes, and every other contestant in the team gets 5,000 additional votes), which can help in their rankings by the end of the 3rd voting round.

=== UNI+ B (Episode 11) ===
Color key

- Leader
- Winning Team

Order	Team	Song (Producer)	Individual Rank	Artist	Total	Result
1	Red	"No Way" (Seo Jae-woo, Breadbeat)	1st	Kanto	330	5th Place
1	Red	"No Way" (Seo Jae-woo, Breadbeat)	2nd	Kim Timoteo	330	5th Place
1	Red	"No Way" (Seo Jae-woo, Breadbeat)	3rd	Jeup	330	5th Place
1	Red	"No Way" (Seo Jae-woo, Breadbeat)	4th	Suwoong	330	5th Place
1	Red	"No Way" (Seo Jae-woo, Breadbeat)	5th	Taeho	330	5th Place
2	Green	"You're Mine" (내꺼) (Kim Seung-soo)	1st	Marco	343	3rd Place
2	Green	"You're Mine" (내꺼) (Kim Seung-soo)	2nd	Rockhyun	343	3rd Place
2	Green	"You're Mine" (내꺼) (Kim Seung-soo)	3rd	Jun.Q	343	3rd Place
2	Green	"You're Mine" (내꺼) (Kim Seung-soo)	4th	Feeldog	343	3rd Place
2	Green	"You're Mine" (내꺼) (Kim Seung-soo)	5th	B-Joo	343	3rd Place
2	Green	"You're Mine" (내꺼) (Kim Seung-soo)	6th	Lee Jungha	343	3rd Place
3	White	"My Story" (Gabriel Branders, Nato Okabe, Daniel Rohtmann)	1st	Seyong	333	4th Place
3	White	"My Story" (Gabriel Branders, Nato Okabe, Daniel Rohtmann)	2nd	Kijoong	333	4th Place
3	White	"My Story" (Gabriel Branders, Nato Okabe, Daniel Rohtmann)	3rd	Raehwan	333	4th Place
3	White	"My Story" (Gabriel Branders, Nato Okabe, Daniel Rohtmann)	4th	Heedo	333	4th Place
3	White	"My Story" (Gabriel Branders, Nato Okabe, Daniel Rohtmann)	5th	Rayoon	333	4th Place
3	White	"My Story" (Gabriel Branders, Nato Okabe, Daniel Rohtmann)	6th	Jun (A.C.E)	333	4th Place
3	White	"My Story" (Gabriel Branders, Nato Okabe, Daniel Rohtmann)	7th	Sungjun	333	4th Place
3	White	"My Story" (Gabriel Branders, Nato Okabe, Daniel Rohtmann)	8th	Im Junhyeok	333	4th Place
4	Yellow	"All Day" (Wonder, Breadbeat, Roydo)	1st	Jun (U-Kiss)	362	1st Place
4	Yellow	"All Day" (Wonder, Breadbeat, Roydo)	2nd	Hangyul	362	1st Place
4	Yellow	"All Day" (Wonder, Breadbeat, Roydo)	3rd	Go Hojung	362	1st Place
4	Yellow	"All Day" (Wonder, Breadbeat, Roydo)	4th	Chan	362	1st Place
4	Yellow	"All Day" (Wonder, Breadbeat, Roydo)	5th	Ji Hansol	362	1st Place
4	Yellow	"All Day" (Wonder, Breadbeat, Roydo)	6th	Dongmyeong	362	1st Place
5	Orange	"Question" (Choi Hyun-jun, Park Seul-gi)	1st	Euijin	356	2nd Place
5	Orange	"Question" (Choi Hyun-jun, Park Seul-gi)	2nd	Lee Geon	356	2nd Place
5	Orange	"Question" (Choi Hyun-jun, Park Seul-gi)	3rd	Donghyun	356	2nd Place
5	Orange	"Question" (Choi Hyun-jun, Park Seul-gi)	4th	Giseok	356	2nd Place
5	Orange	"Question" (Choi Hyun-jun, Park Seul-gi)	5th	Daewon	356	2nd Place
5	Orange	"Question" (Choi Hyun-jun, Park Seul-gi)	6th	Ungjae	356	2nd Place
5	Orange	"Question" (Choi Hyun-jun, Park Seul-gi)	7th	Jungha	356	2nd Place

=== UNI+ G (Episode 12) ===
Color key

- Leader
- Winning Team

Order	Team	Song (Producer)	Individual Rank	Artist	Total	Result
1	Yellow	"Cherry On Top" (Damon Sharpe, Alina Smith, Annalise Morelli, Mats Ymell)	1st	Euijin	374	2nd place
1	Yellow	"Cherry On Top" (Damon Sharpe, Alina Smith, Annalise Morelli, Mats Ymell)	2nd	Semmi	374	2nd place
1	Yellow	"Cherry On Top" (Damon Sharpe, Alina Smith, Annalise Morelli, Mats Ymell)	3rd	Lee Borim	374	2nd place
1	Yellow	"Cherry On Top" (Damon Sharpe, Alina Smith, Annalise Morelli, Mats Ymell)	4th	Haein	374	2nd place
1	Yellow	"Cherry On Top" (Damon Sharpe, Alina Smith, Annalise Morelli, Mats Ymell)	5th	Yoomin	374	2nd place
1	Yellow	"Cherry On Top" (Damon Sharpe, Alina Smith, Annalise Morelli, Mats Ymell)	6th	Yena	374	2nd place
2	Orange	"Poco a Poco" (Duble Sidekick, Bull$Eye, Song Ho-il)	1st	Yang Jiwon	320	5th place
2	Orange	"Poco a Poco" (Duble Sidekick, Bull$Eye, Song Ho-il)	2nd	Somyi	320	5th place
2	Orange	"Poco a Poco" (Duble Sidekick, Bull$Eye, Song Ho-il)	3rd	Yoonjo	320	5th place
2	Orange	"Poco a Poco" (Duble Sidekick, Bull$Eye, Song Ho-il)	4th	Lucky	320	5th place
2	Orange	"Poco a Poco" (Duble Sidekick, Bull$Eye, Song Ho-il)	5th	Chahee	320	5th place
2	Orange	"Poco a Poco" (Duble Sidekick, Bull$Eye, Song Ho-il)	6th	Hyeyeon	320	5th place
3	Red	"Cosmos" (Jerry.L, Sweetch (MAJORIG))	1st	Yebin	343	4th place
3	Red	"Cosmos" (Jerry.L, Sweetch (MAJORIG))	2nd	Heejin	343	4th place
3	Red	"Cosmos" (Jerry.L, Sweetch (MAJORIG))	3rd	Dan-A	343	4th place
3	Red	"Cosmos" (Jerry.L, Sweetch (MAJORIG))	4th	Yeoeun	343	4th place
3	Red	"Cosmos" (Jerry.L, Sweetch (MAJORIG))	5th	Hyosun	343	4th place
3	Red	"Cosmos" (Jerry.L, Sweetch (MAJORIG))	6th	Kim	343	4th place
3	Red	"Cosmos" (Jerry.L, Sweetch (MAJORIG))	7th	Viva	343	4th place
4	Green	"Sweet" (달콤해) (Maxx Song, Damon Sharpe, Jimmy Burney, Melanie Fontana, Jamil Chammas)	1st	ZN	355	3rd place
4	Green	"Sweet" (달콤해) (Maxx Song, Damon Sharpe, Jimmy Burney, Melanie Fontana, Jamil Chammas)	2nd	Anne	355	3rd place
4	Green	"Sweet" (달콤해) (Maxx Song, Damon Sharpe, Jimmy Burney, Melanie Fontana, Jamil Chammas)	3rd	Euna Kim	355	3rd place
4	Green	"Sweet" (달콤해) (Maxx Song, Damon Sharpe, Jimmy Burney, Melanie Fontana, Jamil Chammas)	4th	Woohee	355	3rd place
4	Green	"Sweet" (달콤해) (Maxx Song, Damon Sharpe, Jimmy Burney, Melanie Fontana, Jamil Chammas)	5th	Lee Suji	355	3rd place
4	Green	"Sweet" (달콤해) (Maxx Song, Damon Sharpe, Jimmy Burney, Melanie Fontana, Jamil Chammas)	6th	Nari	355	3rd place
5	White	"Always" (Sophia Pae, Simon Janlöv)	1st	NC.A	377	1st place
5	White	"Always" (Sophia Pae, Simon Janlöv)	2nd	Shin Jihoon	377	1st place
5	White	"Always" (Sophia Pae, Simon Janlöv)	3rd	Jiwon	377	1st place
5	White	"Always" (Sophia Pae, Simon Janlöv)	4th	Yujeong (Laboum)	377	1st place
5	White	"Always" (Sophia Pae, Simon Janlöv)	5th	Lee Hyunjoo	377	1st place
5	White	"Always" (Sophia Pae, Simon Janlöv)	6th	Lee Juhyeon	377	1st place
5	White	"Always" (Sophia Pae, Simon Janlöv)	7th	Serri	377	1st place

== Final Mission: Final Stage Battle ==
The remaining contestants after the 3rd Voting Announcement will form 2 teams of 9 for each gender, through random picking of 1 of the 2 newly produced songs for each gender.

=== Uni+ G (Episode 14) ===
Team	Song (Producer)	Members
White	"Ting" (Wonderkid, Sinkoong, Dalli, Song Ho-jin)	Semmi (Leader), Somyi (Center), Lee Suji, Jiwon, Euna Kim, Yang Jiwon, Lee Hyunjoo, ZN, Dan-A
Red	"You & I" (Duble Sidekick, Bull$Eye, real-fantasy, YOSKE)	Euijin (Leader), Woohee (Center), Yebin, NC.A, Yoonjo, Yeoeun, Shin Jihoon, Chahee, Lee Borim

=== Uni+ B (Episode 14) ===
Team	Song (Producer)	Members
Blue	"Dancing With The Devil" (Command Freaks, Joo Chan-yang, Gabriel Brandes)	Rockhyun (Leader and Center), Jun (U-Kiss), Kim Timoteo, Ji Hansol, Donghyun, Seyong, Jeup, Hangyul, Suwoong
Black	"Pull Me In" (끌어줘) (Duble Sidekick, EastWest, Bull$Eye, Design88)	Euijin (Leader), Daewon (Center), Go Hojung, Feeldog, Kijoong, Dongmyeong, Chan, Marco, Lee Geon

== Discography ==
=== THE UNI+ 마이턴 (My turn) ===
"마이턴 (My turn)"

Single by THE UNI+
- Released: October 13, 2017
- Genre: Soundtrack; K-pop; Dance
- Label: 다 즐거운 사람들 (All the happy people); Interpark
- Songwriters: Black Edition; Kim Eana; Yanggaeng
- Producer: Black Edition

No.	Title	Lyrics	Music	Artists	Length
1.	"마이턴 (My Turn)"	Kim Eana; Black Edition	Black Edition; Yanggaeng	The UNI+	3:33

=== THE UNI+ 빛 (Last One) ===
"빛 (Last One)"

Single by THE UNI+
- Released: October 20, 2017
- Genre: Soundtrack; K-pop; Dance
- Label: 다 즐거운 사람들 (All the happy people); Interpark
- Songwriters: Seo Jae-woo; Zerozine; Kim Dong-ha
- Producers: Seo Jae-woo; Zerozine

No.	Title	Lyrics	Music	Artists	Length
1.	"빛 (Last One)"	Seo Jae-woo; Zerozine; Kim Dong-ha	Seo Jae-woo; Zerozine	Uni+ B	4:11

=== THE UNI+ Shine ===
"Shine"

Single by THE UNI+
- Released: October 27, 2017
- Genre: Soundtrack; K-pop; Dance
- Label: 다 즐거운 사람들 (All the happy people); Interpark
- Songwriters: Kim Seung-soo; Tobirush
- Producers: Kim Seung-soo; Tobirush

No.	Title	Lyrics	Music	Artists	Length
1.	"Shine"	Kim Seung-soo	Kim Seung-soo; Tobirush	Uni+ G	3:25

=== The UNI+ B Step 1 ===
No.	Title	Lyrics	Music	Artists	Length
1.	"All Day"	Roydo; BreadBeat	Wonderkid; Roydo; BreadBeat	Handsome Boys (훈남쓰)	3:33
2.	"Question"	Choi Hyun-jun; Park Seul-gi; Ungjae; Jungha	Choi Hyun-jun; Park Seul-gi	K.B.S (Korean Boys Stars)	3:29
3.	"내꺼 (You're Mine)"	Kim Seung-soo (Sweetune)	Kim Seung-soo (Sweetune)	Pick A Green (초록픽하나; Chorokpikhana)	3:12
4.	"My Story"	mia; Kim Tae-sung; Heedo	Gabriel Brandes; Naoto Okabe; Daniel Rothmann	Unit Ranger (유닛레인저)	3:13
5.	"No Way"	Seo Jae-woo; Wooseok; Kanto	Seo Jae-woo; BreadBeat	Red Is Strong (빨강하다)	3:19

=== The UNI+ G Step 1 ===
No.	Title	Lyrics	Music	Artists	Length
1.	"Always"	Choi Hee-jae	Sophia Pae; Simon Janlöv; Woodz	Blooming (블루밍)	3:26
2.	"Cherry On Top"	Midnight	Damon Sharpe; Alina Smith; Annalise Morelli; Mats Ymell	10:45 (10시 45분)	2:57
3.	"달콤해 (Sweet)"	Kim Tae-sung	Maxx Song; Damon Sharpe; Jimmy Burney; Melanie Fontana; Jamil 'Digi' Chammas	Too Charming (투챠밍)	3:07
4.	"Cosmos"	Jerry.L; Sweetch (MAJORIG)	Jerry.L; Sweetch (MAJORIG)	Red Band Girls (홍단소녀)	3:22
5.	"Poco a Poco"	Duble Sidekick; Bull$Eye; Song Ho-il	Duble Sidekick; Bull$Eye; Song Ho-il	Nine Girls (아홉소녀들)	2:59

=== The UNI+ Final ===
No.	Title	Lyrics	Music	Artists	Length
1.	"끌어줘 (Raise Me Up)"	Duble Sidekick; EastWest; Bull$Eye; Design88	Duble Sidekick; 237	High Five (하이파이브)	3:26
2.	"Dancing With The Devil"	Hi-Graphy (Iconic Sounds)	Command Freaks; Joo Chan-yang; Gabriel Brandes; Allison Kaplan	Unit Plus (유닛플러스)	3:21
3.	"Ting"	Wonderkid; Sinkoong; Dalli; Song Ho-jin	Dalli; Sinkoong; Wonderkid	Tinkling (팅클링)	3:16
4.	"You & I (내가 하고싶은 말은) (What I Want To Say)"	Duble Sidekick; Bull$Eye; real-fantasy; YOSKE	Duble Sidekick; Bull$Eye; real-fantasy; YOSKE	To You To Me (니하고내하고)	3:19
5.	"Present"	Sweetch (MAJORIG); Jerry.L	Sweetch (MAJORIG); Jerry.L	THE UNI+	3:33

== Ratings ==
In the ratings below, the highest rating for the show will be in red, and the lowest rating for the show will be in blue each year.

Ep.	Original broadcast date	Average audience share (Nationwide)	
Ep.	Original broadcast date	TNmS	AGB Nielsen
1	October 28, 2017	5.3%	5.0%
2	October 28, 2017	5.2%	6.2%
3	November 4, 2017	5.3%	4.7%
4	November 4, 2017	5.5%	5.2%
5	November 11, 2017	4.7%	4.1%
6	November 11, 2017	3.9%	3.6%
7	November 18, 2017	4.4%	3.9%
8	November 18, 2017	4.2%	4.5%
9	November 25, 2017	2.9%	3.5%
10	November 25, 2017	3.6%	4.2%
11	December 2, 2017	2.6%	2.9%
12	December 2, 2017	2.6%	3.1%
13	December 9, 2017	2.8%	2.8%
14	December 9, 2017	2.3%	2.7%
15	December 16, 2017	2.0%	2.3%
16	December 16, 2017	2.4%	2.3%
17	December 23, 2017	2.1%	2.5%
18	December 23, 2017	2.0%	2.6%
19	January 6, 2018	2.6%	2.0%
20	January 6, 2018	2.7%	2.5%
21	January 13, 2018	2.1%	2.2%
22	January 13, 2018	1.9%	2.3%
23	January 20, 2018	2.2%	2.1%
24	January 20, 2018	1.9%	2.8%
25	February 3, 2018	1.7%	2.2%
26	February 3, 2018	1.6%	2.0%
27	February 10, 2018	3.5%	2.6%
28	February 10, 2018	3.5%	2.2%
Average		3.1%	3.2%
Special 1	February 18, 2018	2.0%	1.7%
Special 2	February 24, 2018		

== Aftermath ==
- A fan-meeting for UNB and UNI.T was held at Blue Square iMarket Hall on March 3, 2018.
- UNB debuted with their first EP Boyhood with the lead single "Feeling" on April 7, 2018. They followed up with a comeback through the mini album "Black Heart" on June 28. The title track "Black Heart" features former The Unit contestants Jungha (formerly of Beatwin), Anne (of S.I.S) and Hangyul (of IM), together with DIA member Jueun as back-up performers.
- UNI.T debuted with their first EP Line with "No More" as its lead single on May 18, 2018. The group pre-released the single "Begin With the End" on September 15, before releasing their second and final mini album "Begin With The End", with the title track "I Mean" on September 18. ZN will not be involved in this comeback due to Japanese promotions with her group Laboum. On October 12, 2018 the group performed "I Mean" and "Begin With The End" for the last time at Music Bank and later on the same day they held their last fan-meeting as a group, after which they have disbanded.
- Several group members resumed activities:
  - Ji Han-sol debuted as a member of Newkidd with the single "Shooting Star" on July 25, 2018.
  - ZN, together with Yujeong and Haein, returned to Laboum with the single album "Between Us" on July 27, 2018.
  - Yebin, together with Somyi, returned to DIA with the mini album "Summer Ade" on August 9, 2018.
  - NC.A released "I'm Fine" on October 13, 2018.
  - Go Ho-jung, together with Timoteo, returned to Hotshot and the group released a mini album "Early Flowering" on November 15, 2018. The group disbanded on March 30, 2021.
  - Feeldog returned to Big Star. However, the group disbanded a few months later due to the expiration of members' contracts, He then participated in Street Man Fighter under the crew "Bank Two Brothers".
Other contestants
- Soya returned as a soloist with the single "Show" on January 31, 2018. She released another single "Oasis" on April 18, 2018. With B.I.G member and fellow former The Unit contestant Heedo as featuring, she released a single titled Y-shirt (Deep Inside) on July 31, 2018.
- Kang Min-hee returned as a soloist on February 14, 2018, with the single "Toddle".
- Lena participated in Produce 101 China.
- Seol Ha-yoon returned as a trot singer with a cover of LPG's "Ring My Heart" on April 13, 2018.
- Jeup, Taeho, Jian and Ungjae returned to Imfact with the single "The Light" on April 17, 2018.
- Sangil, Suhyun and Sebin returned to Snuper with the EP Blossom on April 24, 2018.
- Kanto returned as a soloist on May 15, 2018 with the EP Repetition.
- Euna Kim debuted in duo KHAN with former The Ark member Jeon Min-ju on May 23, 2018 with the single "I'm Your Girl?". However, after three years of inactivity, she announced her retirement from the entertainment industry on May 24, 2021.
- Yena returned to G-reyish with the single "Remind" on May 24, 2018.
- Junghoon and Kyeongha returned to TST with the single "Love Story" on May 25, 2018. However, on June 11, it was announced that Kyeongha left the group due to him being found guilty of sexual assault.
- Jun and Chan returned to A.C.E with the single "Take Me Higher" on June 8, 2018.
- Yeoeun, Yoomin and Chahee returned to Melody Day with the single "Restless" on June 29, 2018. The group officially disbanded on December 26, 2018.
- Rockhyun returned to 100% with the single "Grand Bleu" on July 26, 2018. This is also the group's first single since the death of leader Seo Min-woo, who also auditioned for the show but failed to receive any boots. The group disbanded on September 27, 2021.
- Taro returned to H.B.Y and together with fellow H.B.Y members Jisan and Kyuhyuck, they formed a sub-unit of the group "H.B.Y (TaJiHyuck)". They released the single "Waiting" on July 26, 2018.
- Lex and Euijin returned to Bigflo with "Upside Down" on August 18, 2018, but promoted the song a week before its release.
- Lee Ju-hyeon participated in KBS dance survival show "Dancing High". She subsequently debuted with girl group Lightsum in June 2021.
- The band MAS was revealed to re-debut under the new band name Onewe. They made their official re-debut with their single "Reminisce About All" on May 13, 2019.
- It was announced that Casper will participate in Idol Producer Season 2 but he left the show after the first episode.
- Hangyul participated in Produce X 101 and became a member of winning group X1. He subsequently became a member of BAE173 after X1's disbandment.
- Yuji, Sandy and Haeun returned to APPLE.B but the group had disbanded. Sandy left her company, while Yuji and Haeun re-debuted with 3YE on May 21, 2019 with the single "DMT (Do Ma Thang)".
- Good Day had disbanded.
  - Chaesol, Jiwon, Viva and Lucky re-debuted with Cignature on February 4, 2020 with the single "Nun Nu Nan Na". The latter three re-debuted with new stage names Jeewon, Sunn and Belle respectively.
    - Belle re-debuted through the survival show Universe Ticket in 2024 as a member of UNIS under her real name, Jin Hyeonju.
  - Genie re-debuted with Redsquare on May 19, 2020, under the stage name Green, with the single album "Prequel". Redsquare subsequently disbanded and had rebranded as Irris, where she re-debuted again under the stage name I.L.
- Yujeong and Eunji returned to Brave Girls with the release of the digital single "We Ride" on August 14, 2020. The group got a sudden rise in popularity after their song "Rollin" became viral in 2021. The group got their first win on March 14, 2021 with "Rollin".
- Tae.E has re-debuted with girl group Lunarsolar on September 2, 2020 with the single "Oh Ya Ya Ya", under the new stage name Jian.
