= S.I.S (group) =

2017–2020 South Korean girl group

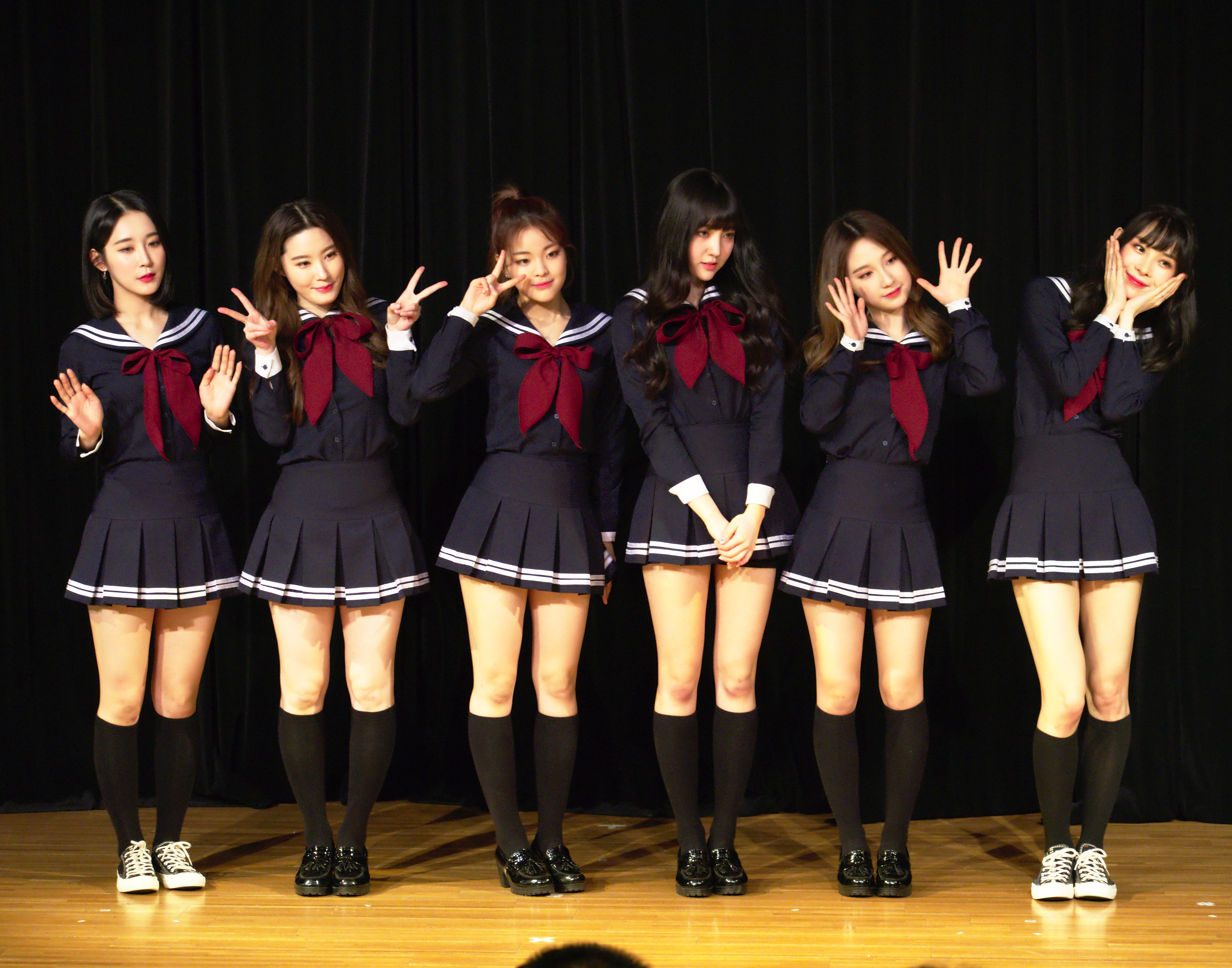
- S.I.S Spring Concert in Tokyo 2019

Background information
- Also known as: Serendipity in Stars
- Origin: Seoul, South Korea
- Genres: K-pop
- Years active: 2017–2020
- Labels: Double X Entertainment (JMG Global)
- Past members: J.Sun (Jihae); Dal; Minzy; Gaeul; Anne; Sebin
- Website: Official website

S.I.S (Korean: 에스아이에스) was a South Korean girl group formed by Double X Entertainment in 2017. They debuted on August 25, 2017, with I've Got A Feeling.

== Career ==
In 2017 all members participated in KBS's The Unit: Idol Rebooting Project; however, only Anne, Gaeul and Sebin passed the audition stage. Sebin was eliminated at rank 55, Gaeul was eliminated at rank 39 and Anne was eliminated at rank 22.

Later on, Anne was shown as a back-up performer in UNB's Black Heart and was seen in performances with them alongside DIA's Jueun, former Beatwin member Jungha and BAE173's Hangyul. Hangyul and Jungha had participated in The Unit alongside Anne.

On 31 December 2018, S.I.S announced their fandom name to be "MILY" (밀리).

On 7 February 2019, it was announced that member Dal was preparing for a solo debut. She debuted on February 10 with the digital single "Sad Love Story".

On 13 July 2019, Double X Entertainment revealed that "S.I.S will be promoting as a 4-member group with Minji, Gaeul, Anne and Sebin from now on." Double X added on, "our contract with member Jihye recently came to an end [...] Dal, on the other hand, will be taking a hiatus from her promotions due to personal reason." It was then revealed on Dal's personal Instagram account that she has left the company and is no longer a member of the group.

S.I.S quietly disbanded in 2020 as they made their Instagram handle private.

== Members ==
=== Former members ===
- J.Sun (지해)
- Dal (달)
- Minzy (민지)
- Gaeul (가을)
- Anne (앤)
- Sebin (세빈)

== Discography ==
=== Single albums ===
Title	Album details	Peak chart positions	Sales
Title	Album details	KOR	Sales
I've Got a Feeling	Released: August 25, 2017; Label: Double X Entertainment, Music&NEW; Formats: CD, digital download; Track listing: 1. I've Got a Feeling (느낌이 와); 2. 아야; 3. 나의 우주	25	KOR: 1,000+
Say Yes	Released: September 20, 2018; Label: Double X Entertainment, Loen Entertainment; Formats: CD, digital download; Track listing: 1. Say Yes; 2. Crush; 3. Pink Flowers; 4. Say Yes (instrumental)	25	KOR: 1,418
Always Be Your Girl	Released: March 6, 2019; Label: Double X Entertainment, NHN Bugs; Formats: CD, digital download	34	KOR: 1,496
Don't Wait	Released: July 31, 2020; Label: Double X Entertainment, KT Music; Formats: CD, digital download	66	

=== Singles ===
Title	Year	Album
"I've Got a Feeling" (느낌이 와)	2017	I've Got a Feeling
"SAY YES" (응)	2018	SAY YES
"Always Be Your Girl" (너의 소녀가 되어줄게)	2019	Non-album single
"Shalala" (샤랄라)	2019	Legal High, Pt. 4 OST
"Don't Wait" (기다리지 말아요)	2020	Non-album single
