= Eduardo Basagaña =

Eduardo José Basagaña
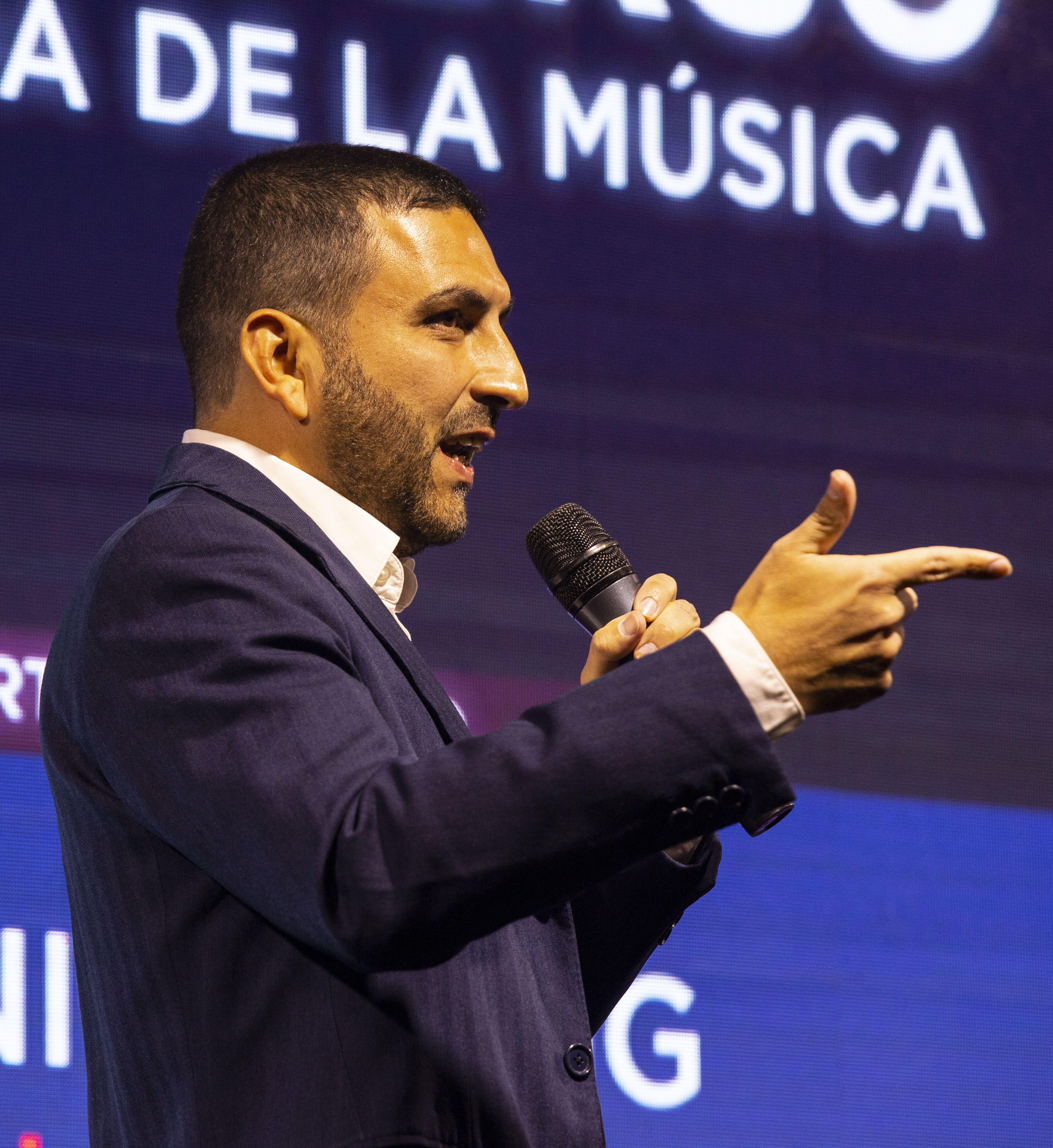
- Eduardo Basagaña in 2023
- Born: March 19, 1981 (age 45); Buenos Aires, Argentina
- Education: Harvard Business School; Pontifical Catholic University of Argentina; University of Palermo; New York University
- Occupations: Music executive, businessperson
- Website: ebproducciones.com

Eduardo José Basagaña (born March 19, 1981) is an Argentine music executive and businessperson. He has worked with artists including Karol G, Aitana, Mon Laferte, Paloma San Basilio and Pimpinela, and organized festivals such as PWR Festival and Tereré Fest.

Through his platform +VIVO, he coordinated a streaming presentation for the South Korean pop group 3YE, which became the first exclusive online concert for Latin America by a K-pop group. With his company EB Producciones, he signed an agreement for the international career development of the artist Ana Mena, in addition to organizing the farewell events for singer Paloma San Basilio.

According to Rolling Stone, Basagaña has positioned himself as "a key figure in the global expansion of Latin music".

== Early life and education ==
Basagaña was born in Buenos Aires, Argentina. He received a finance certification from the Pontifical Catholic University of Argentina, followed by studies at the University of Palermo and New York University with a focus on entertainment and media. He later completed a technology entrepreneurship program at Harvard Business School.

== Career ==
Basagaña began his professional work in the entertainment industry by volunteering for charity events such as "Raise Your Hand, Argentina" and "Embrace Patagonia," which featured performances by artists including Abel Pintos. In 2013, he founded EB Producciones, an entertainment company with offices in Buenos Aires and Miami that also operates in Latin America and Spain.

Through EB Producciones, Basagaña organized the 2019 PWR Festival at Luna Park in Buenos Aires, which was the first-ever all-female Festival in the world featuring a lineup including Sofía Reyes, Natalia Jiménez, and Ángela Torres. The event, held on International Women's Day, donated its profits to the Argentine League for the Fight Against Cancer. Another notable event he created was the Tereré Fest in Corrientes, which has featured performances by artists such as Paty Cantu, Airbag, and Tan Bionica.

In 2020, Basagaña promoted Karol G's concert at Montevideo's Antel Arena, marking the Colombian artist's first solo arena performance. His company has also managed tours for Spanish singer Aitana in Argentina and Uruguay, Pimpinela's 40th anniversary tour in the United States, and shows by Natalia Jiménez, Wos, and Francisca Valenzuela across Latin America.

In September 2020, Basagaña launched +VIVO, an immersive audio streaming platform. The platform hosted a concert by Argentine band La Beriso, which Billboard reported as the streaming concert with the highest number of virtual tickets sold in Argentina's history. On July 31, 2021, +VIVO presented South Korean group 3YE's first Latin America-exclusive K-pop concert, an event recognized by Forbes magazine. Basagaña expanded into digital entertainment in 2021 by developing a music-focused metaverse through +VIVO, which he presented at the 2022 Virtuality technology event.

In 2022, he signed Angela Leiva, an Argentine cumbia singer, in an exclusive management and booking deal. In January 2024, EB Producciones signed an exclusive agreement with Spanish artist Ana Mena for her international career development. Under Basagaña's work, Mena achieved a peak of 1500% on her streams in Latin America and her first Golden Disc Award outside of Europe. The company announced plans to expand operations to Spain that same year.

Under Basagaña’s management, in August 2025, Mena became the first female Latin artist to headline a festival in Asia at A-nation in Tokyo. Three months later, the entrepreneur served as a speaker at the Tokyo International Music Market (TIMM) as part of his expansion into emerging markets in Asia and Africa.

In January 2025, Basagaña announced the creation of his own record label. This launch was accompanied by a global distribution agreement with the social media platform TikTok. The first artist signed to the label was singer Juli Obregón.

In February 2026, Basagaña, through his company EB Producciones, co-organized a tribute to Paloma San Basilio's career alongside the Consulate General of Spain in Miami at the Consular Residence in Coral Gables. The event, designed as a recognition of the artist's fifty-year career, marked the beginning of her farewell activities.

== Awards and recognition ==
Basagaña has received proclamations from New York State Assembly and Westchester County, New York.
