= Newkidd =

South Korean boy band

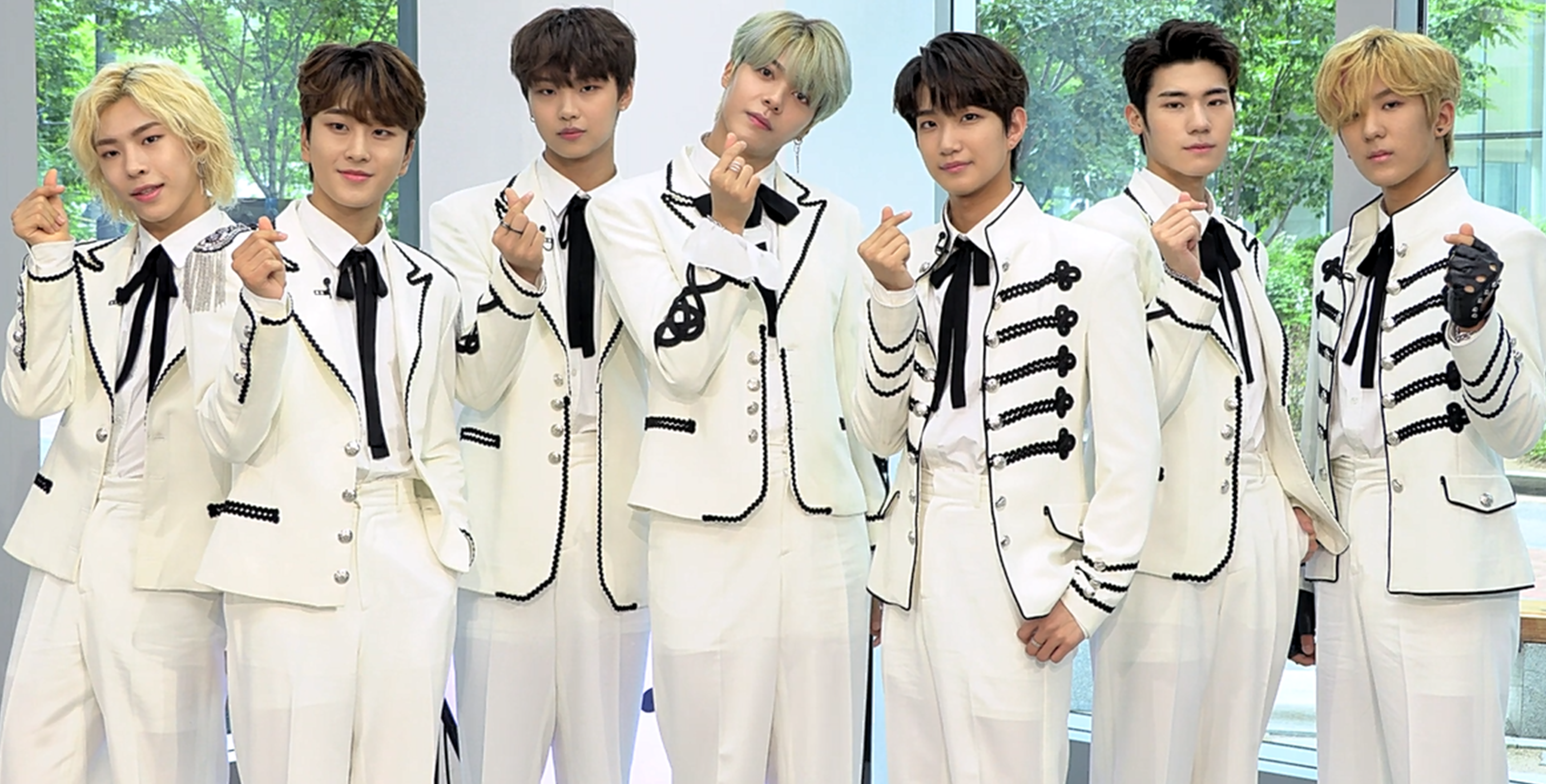
- NewKidd during a recording of Fact in Star, June 2019; L-R: Hwi, Jinkwon, Yunmin, Ji Han-sol, Woochul, Choi Ji-ann, and Kang Seung-chan

Background information
- Origin: Seoul, South Korea
- Genres: K-pop; Dance-pop
- Years active: 2017–present
- Label: J-Flo Entertainment
- Spinoffs: Newkidd - Lemme Spoil U; Newkidd02
- Members: Ji Han-sol; Jinkwon; Yunmin; Woochul; Hwi; Choi Ji-ann; Kang Seung-chan; Lee Min-wook
- Website: www.jflo.kr

Newkidd (Korean: 뉴키드), also stylized as NewKidd, is a South Korean boy band formed by J-Flo Entertainment. The group is composed of eight members: Jinkwon, Ji Han-sol, Choi Ji-ann, Yunmin, Hwi, Woochul, Lee Min-wook and Kang Seung-chan. The group officially debuted on April 25, 2019, with their self-titled single album Newkidd.

== Name ==
Newkidd stands for "New generation key of dream".

== History ==
=== 2017–2019: Pre-debut ===
In 2017, J-Flo Entertainment formed Newkidd as a pre-debut project with four members, Ji Han-sol, Yunmin, Jinkwon, and Woochul. Ji Han-sol is also a former SM Entertainment trainee who joined while still completing promotions with UNB, a boy group formed by the KBS reality show The Unit. Prior to debut, the label announced the release of a pre-debut single entitled "Will You Be Ma".

On July 10, 2018, two new members were added to the lineup: Hwi, and Choi Ji-ann. They began promoting as Newkidd02 for their second pre-debut single album Boy Boy Boy. The group's final member, Kang Seung-chan, was added shortly before debut.

=== 2019-present: Debut with Newkidd and group hiatus ===
On the April 23, 2019, Newkidd held a debut showcase ahead of their debut on April 25. They debuted with the self-titled album Newkidd featuring the title track "Tu eres". Following their debut, they promoted on music shows such as M Countdown, Music Bank, Inkigayo, and Show Champion.

On February 20, 2021, J-FLO Entertainment announced that Hansol would be enlisting as a public service worker. He returned in November 2022.

On April 11, 2022, Woochul and Yunmin was revealed as one of the Korean members, of an upcoming Thai-Korean boy group. The boy group would be formed by the Thai survival show Seven Stars, which started airing on July 2, 2022.

On July 28, 2022, the news of Minwook's addition was announced via Newkidd's official Twitter.

On August 10, 2021, Jinkwon was introduced as the 10th contestant of the survival show Wild Idol. Unfortunately, he was eliminated in the third episode and was unable to make it further in the show.

On November 1, 2022, Newkidd's agency announced that their new digital single "Victory" release has been postponed due to the Seoul Halloween crowd crush. and will release a single on November 7.

On November 8, 2022, J-FLO Entertainment announced that Hwi would enlist as an active-duty soldier.

== Influence ==
Newkidd cite BTS as their role models.

== Members ==
- Jinkwon (Korean: 진권) – leader, vocal
- Ji Han-sol (Korean: 지한솔) – dance, vocal
- Choi Ji-ann (Korean: 최지안) – dance, vocal
- Kang Seung-chan (Korean: 강승찬) – rap
- Lee Min-wook

=== Inactive ===
- Hwi (Korean: 휘) – main vocal
- Yunmin (Korean: 윤민) – vice leader, dance, vocal
- Woochul (Korean: 우철) – dance, vocal

== Discography ==
=== Single albums ===
Title	Album details	Peak chart positions	Sales
Title	Album details	KOR	Sales
Newkidd	Released: April 25, 2019; Label: J Flo Entertainment, Warner Music; Formats: CD, digital download	14	KOR: 3,713
Come	Released: November 28, 2019; Label: J Flo Entertainment, Warner Music; Formats: CD, digital download	24	KOR: 2,053

=== Singles ===
Title	Year	Peak chart positions		Album
Title	Year	KOR		Album
Title	Year	Gaon	Hot	Album
"Tu eres" (뚜에레스)	2019	—	—	Newkidd
"Come"	2019	—	—	Come
"Victory"	2022	—	—	Non-album single
Newkidd - Lemme Spoil U / Newkidd02 (sub-unit)
"Will You Be Ma" (소년이 사랑할 때) (as Lemme Spoil U)	2017	—	—	Non-album single
"Shooting Star" (나는 너야) (as Newkidd02)	2018	—	—	Boy Boy Boy
"—" denotes releases that did not chart.
