= Rubber Soul (group) =

South Korean hip hop duo

- Origin: Seoul, South Korea
- Genres: Hip hop
- Years active: 2015–present
- Labels: Universal Music; Happy Tribe Entertainment; With HC; Mad Soul Child
- Members: Choi Cho; Kim
- Past members: Lala

Rubber Soul (Korean: 러버소울) is a South Korean hip hop duo. The all-female group debuted as a trio in 2015 with the single "Life," featuring Mad Clown. After the departure of Lala, the group released their first EP, Love Is, in 2017. The name was derived from the Beatles' 1965 studio album Rubber Soul.

== Members ==
- Choi Cho (최초; born May 10, 1992) - vocals
- Kim (김; born May 18, 1993) - vocals

=== Past member ===
- Lala (라라; November 15, 1990) - vocals

== Career ==
Rubber Soul debuted in 2015 as a joint project of record labels Universal Music, Happy Tribe Entertainment, and With HC. They performed their first single, "Life," for the first time on February 10, 2015, on SBS MTV's The Show. This marked their official debut and the group continued promotions on various shows for a few months with both "Life" and their side-track "Lonely Friday" with features Mad Soul Child's Jinsil.

Rubber Soul continued to promote their singles via street performances in Hongdae, as well as performing lives of unreleased songs such as "Choice" and "Beautiful Woman".

In February, they took part in SNL Korea 6 as guest members on episode 1.

The trio also participated in a pictorial in Dazed magazine in April.

The group performed alongside other Korean artists such as MYNAME, G-Friend, Galaxy Express, T-ARA, MAMAMOO and others in September for the Asian Music Network festival.

In October, 2015, the group participated alongside Giriboy, Black Nut and Genius Nochang in a "1st Look" pictorial for Vans and the winter collection "Designed for the Elements".

== Solo activities ==
Kim participated in the reality show Unpretty Rapstar 2 as a contestant starting with episode 6. Kim was also a contestant on The Unit.

== Discography ==
=== Extended play ===
Title	Album details	Peak chart positions	Sales
Title	Album details	KOR	Sales
Love Is	Released: May 30, 2017; Labels: Mad Soul Child, Universal Music; Formats: CD, digital download; Track listing: 1. Freedom; 2. Dream; 3. Love Is	—	—
"—" denotes releases that did not chart.

=== Singles ===
Title	Year	Peak chart positions	Sales (DL)	Album
Title	Year	KOR	Sales (DL)	Album
"Life" feat. Mad Clown	2015	—	—	Non-album singles
"Beautiful Women"	2017	—	—	Non-album singles
"Hone Me" feat. YunB	2017	—	—	Non-album singles
"—" denotes releases that did not chart.
