= Bigflo =

South Korean boy band

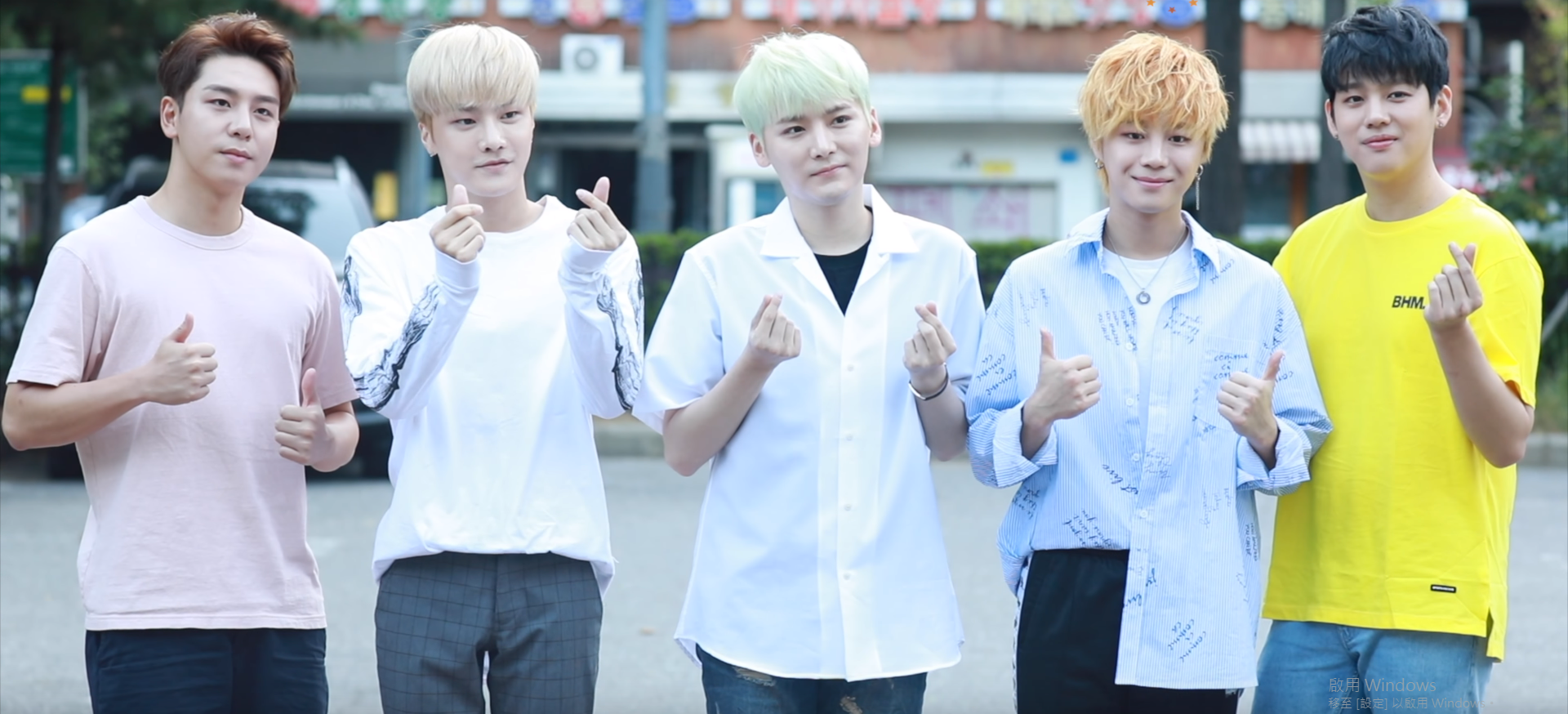
- Bigflo in 2018

Background information
- Origin: Seoul, South Korea
- Genres: K-pop
- Years active: 2014–2020; 2026–present
- Labels: HO Company; Madewell
- Members: Jungkyun; Kichun; Z-Uk; Ron
- Past members: HighTop; Yuseong; Lex; Euijin; Sungmin
- Website: wanenter.com

Bigflo (Korean: 빅플로; stylized BIGFLO) is a South Korean boy band formed by HO Company. The group consists of four members: Jungkyun, Kichun, Z-UK and Ron and five former members: HighTop, Yuseong, Lex, Euijin and Sungmin. They made their debut with the mini-album First Flow on June 23, 2014.

== Career ==
=== 2014: Formation and debut ===
The band was formed on June 19, 2014, with five members, Jungkyun, HighTop, Ron, Yuseong and Jiwook (Z-UK).

On June 23, 2014, the group debuted with their first EP First Flow, which included the songs "Delilah", "It's You Again", and "Fly". The group's leader at the time Jungkyun and member HighTop contributed lyrics, music and arrangements for all three. HighTop said they worked on it for about three months, and selected songs that best reflected the individuality and merits of the members.

=== 2015–2019: Debut in Japan and new members ===
On April 15, 2015, they debuted in Japan with a single album Delilah (Japanese version), after signing with the same Japanese Company, KISS Entertainment, who other groups BtoB, Girl's Day, and Secret were signed with for their Japanese promotions. They held solo concerts in Japan on April 18 and 26, and album release events in Osaka, Nagoya and Tokyo. While in Japan, they also performed at the KCON Saitama concert on April 22, at the Saitama Super Arena.

On June 18, 2015, they reformed as a six-member group following the additional of new member Kichun, a singer, dancer and actor who studied in China for several years, and is fluent in Chinese, Japanese and Korean. On December 13, 2016, Z-UK and Kichun announced their departure from the group. As a result, the three new members have been added for Bigflo's upcoming mini-album "Stardom" in February 2017.

In October 2017, it was confirmed that Lex and Euijin as well as former member Z-Uk joined The Unit: Idol Rebooting Project. In the finale episode, Euijin was ranked in 2nd place and made it into lineup of winning boy group UNB.

On January 17, 2019, it was confirmed that Ron, HighTop, Jungkyun and Yuseong officially departed from the group after their contract expired.

=== 2026–present: Reunion ===
On September 8, 2026, WE:A, a group formed by original members Jeongkyun, Ron, Kichun and Z-uK in 2022, changed their group name to BIGFLO after two years of inactivity. The following day, they announced a Japan tour on November 28, titled BIGFLO 2026 Live In Japan: Come Back Home, at Kabukicho Theater.

== Members ==
=== Current members ===
- Z-UK (지욱)
- Kichun (기천)
- Ron (Korean: 론)
- Jungkyun (정균)

=== Former members ===
- HighTop (하이탑)
- Yuseong (유성)
- Lex (렉스)
- Euijin (의진)
- Sungmin (성민)

== Discography ==
=== Extended plays ===
Title	Album details	Peak chart positions		Sales
Title	Album details	KOR (Note: Week references for the Gaon Album Chart: First Flow, Second Flow, Incant, Emphas!ze)	JPN	Sales
Korean
First Flow	Released: June 23, 2014; Label: HO Company, CJ E&M Music; Format: CD, digital download	27	—	KOR: 2,155
Second Flow	Released: November 25, 2014; Label: HO Company, TSN Company; Format: CD, digital download	10	—	KOR: 2,033
Incant	Released: October 8, 2015; Label: HO Company, KT Music; Format: CD, digital download	16	—	KOR: 1,066
Stardom	Released: February 15, 2017; Label: Hyeyoom Entertainment, Naturally Music; Format: CD, digital download	—	165	JPN: 925
Emphas!ze	Released: August 18, 2018; Label: HO Company, Loen Entertainment; Format: CD, digital download	16	—	KOR: 3,666
"—" denotes a recording that did not chart or was not released in that territory.

=== Singles ===
Title	Year	Peak chart positions		Album
Title	Year	JPN (Note: Week references for the Oricon Singles Chart: "Delilah (JPN ver.)", "1,2,3,4".)	JPN Hot (Note: Week references for the Billboard Japan Hot 100: "1,2,3,4".)	Album
Korean
"Delilah"	2014	—	—	First Flow
"Bad Mama Jama"	2014	—	—	Second Flow
"We, Now" (우리, 이젠; Uri, Ijen)	2015	—	—	Non-album single
"Obliviate"	2015	—	—	Incant
"Stardom"	2017	—	—	Non-album single
"Upside Down"	2018	—	—	Emphas!ze
Japanese
"Delilah" (JPN ver.)	2015	17	—	Non-album singles
"1,2,3,4"	2015	19	64	Non-album singles
Vietnamese
"Delilah"	2015	—	—	Non-album single
"—" denotes a recording that did not chart or was not released in that territory.
