= UNB (group) =

South Korean boy band

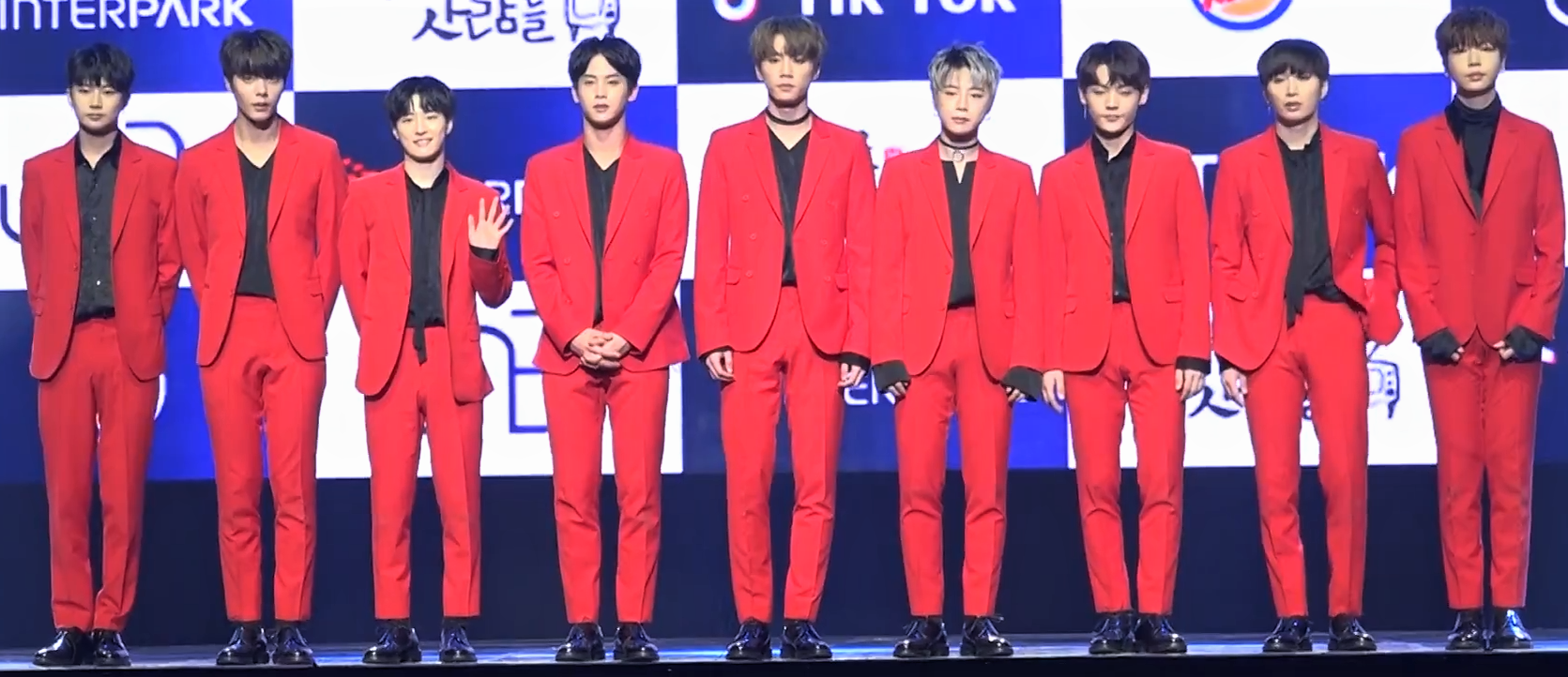
- UNB in March 2018

Background information
- Origin: Seoul, South Korea
- Genres: K-pop; Electropop; Hip hop
- Years active: 2018–2019 2026–present
- Members: Euijin; Daewon; Marco; Ko Ho-jung; Ji Han-sol; Kijung
- Past members: Feeldog; Jun; Chan

UNB (Korean: 유앤비) was a South Korean boy band formed through the KBS reality competition show The Unit in 2018. The group consists of six members: Euijin, Daewon, Marco, Ko Ho-jung, Ji Han-sol, and Kijung. They debuted on April 7, 2018, with the extended play (EP) Boyhood and ended their activities on January 27, 2019. On November 21, 2026, it was announced that the group would be releasing single.

== History ==
=== The Unit: Idol Rebooting Project ===
Prior to The Unit, all the members were actively involved in the entertainment industry: Feeldog debuted in 2012 as a member of Big Star. Euijin debuted in 2017 as a member of Bigflo. Daewon debuted as a member of Madtown in 2014 which later disbanded during the show. Ko Hojung debuted as a member of Hotshot in 2014. Jun joined U-KISS as the youngest member in 2014. In 2017, Chan debuted as a member of A.C.E, Kijung as a member of IM, and Marco as a member of Hot Blood Youth. Ji Hansol is a former SM Rookies trainee who left the company in 2017 to sign with J-FLO Entertainment and debuted with Newkidd.

In July 2017, KBS announced their new survival show that would create male and female unit groups, with nine members each, among idols who had already debuted. The program aimed to give them a fair chance to demonstrate their talents that they might not have been able to showcase before. It premiered on October 28, 2017 and concluded on February 10, 2018.

In November 2017, it was announced that the winning group will do promotions for seven months and if the winning group gained success, their contract will be extended up to twenty-five months. The winning group members had opportunity to participate in other activities with their original agencies.

On February 21, 2018, it was revealed that the male group, Uni+ B, would hold their first fan-meeting on March 3 at Blue Square iMarket Hall. The tickets sold out within two hours of being on sale.

On February 24's broadcast of The Unit's Special Show, the final nine male contestants that formed "Uni+ B" became UNB following the announcement.

=== 2018–2019: Debut, Boyhood, Black Heart and disbandment ===
On April 7, UNB officially made their debut with their extended play titled Boyhood. The EP featured double title tracks, "Feeling" and "Only One". They held their debut stage on You Hee-yeol's Sketchbook.

On June 1, a dance battle video was released, showcasing the chorus of the new song, Black Heart. Over the following days, other clips teasing the song were released as well. On June 11, a mysterious poster was posted online. The poster showed eye close-ups of two men and women, along with the date 28 June 2018 and UNB's logo. It was later revealed to be the release date of the group's second mini-album.

On June 28, the EP Black Heart was released, along with the music video of the lead track with the same name.

=== 2026–present: 2026 reunion ===
On June 19 2026 at 8 p.m. KST, UNB surprised fans with an unexpected post on X (formerly Twitter)—marking the group’s first social media update since officially concluding group activities in January 2019. The teaser image features UNB’s logo along with the words “REBORN · REBOOT · REUNITE,” sparking speculation about a possible reunion project.

On November 21, 2026, it was announced that the group would be releasing their first single as a six-member group, with Feeldog, Jun and Chan focusing on their individual activities.

== Members ==
- Euijin (의진; Bigflo)
- Feeldog (필독; Big Star) — leader
- Daewon (대원; former Madtown)
- Marco (마르코; Hot Blood Youth)
- Ko Ho-jung (고호정; Hotshot)
- Ji Han-sol (지한솔; Newkidd)
- Jun (준; U-KISS)
- Chan (찬; A.C.E)
- Kijung (기중; IM)

== Discography ==
=== Extended plays ===
| Title | Details | Peak chart positions | | Sales |
| Title | Details | KOR | JPN | Sales |
|---|---|---|---|---|
| Boyhood | Released: April 7, 2018; Label: All the Happy People, Interpark Music; Formats: CD, digital download; Track listing: 1. "Sense" (감각); 2. "Only One"; 3. "Ride with Me"; 4. "Rebooting" (믿어줘); 5. "Sense" (감각; inst.); 6. "Only One" (inst.) | 2 | 40 | KOR: 46,131+; JPN: 2,853+ |
| Black Heart | Released: June 28, 2018; Label: PocketDol Studio, Interpark Music; Formats: CD, digital download; Track listing: 1. "Black Heart"; 2. "After the Rain" (비 내린 후에); 3. "Moonlight"; 4. "To.Unme (Present)"; 5. "Dancing with the Devil" (live – Black ver.) "Pull Me" (끌어줘; live – Heart ver.); 6. "Black Heart" (inst.); 7. "After the Rain" (비 내린 후에; inst.); 8. "Moonlight" (inst.) | 7 | 46 | KOR: 48,855+; JPN: 2,365 |

=== Live albums ===
| Title | Details | Peak chart positions | Sales |
| Title | Details | KOR | Sales |
|---|---|---|---|
| 2018 UNB Fan-Con (Let's Begin, UNMe) | Released: August 1, 2018; Label: PocketDol Studio, Interpark Music; Formats: DVD | 6 | KOR: 10,499+ |
| UNB 2018 Japan Live DVD "All Of Our Memories" | Released: 2019; Label: PocketDol Studio, Interpark Music; Formats: DVD | | |

=== Singles ===
| Title | Year | Album |
|---|---|---|
| "Feeling" (감각) | 2018 | Boyhood |
| "Only One" | 2018 | Boyhood |
| "Black Heart" | 2018 | Black Heart |

== Filmography ==
=== Reality show ===
- The Unit (KBS2, 2017–18)
- UNB in Japan: OND (2018)

== Awards and nominations ==
=== Asian Music Awards ===
| Year | Category | Recipient | Result |
|---|---|---|---|
| 2018 | New Star Award (Singer) | UNB | Won |

=== Golden Disc Awards ===
| Year | Category | Recipient | Result |
|---|---|---|---|
| 2019 | Rookie Artist Award | UNB | Nominated |
| 2019 | Popularity Award | UNB | Nominated |

=== Soribada Best K-Music Awards ===
| Year | Category | Recipient | Result |
|---|---|---|---|
| 2018 | Music Star Award | UNB | Won |
