= B.I.G =

South Korean boy band

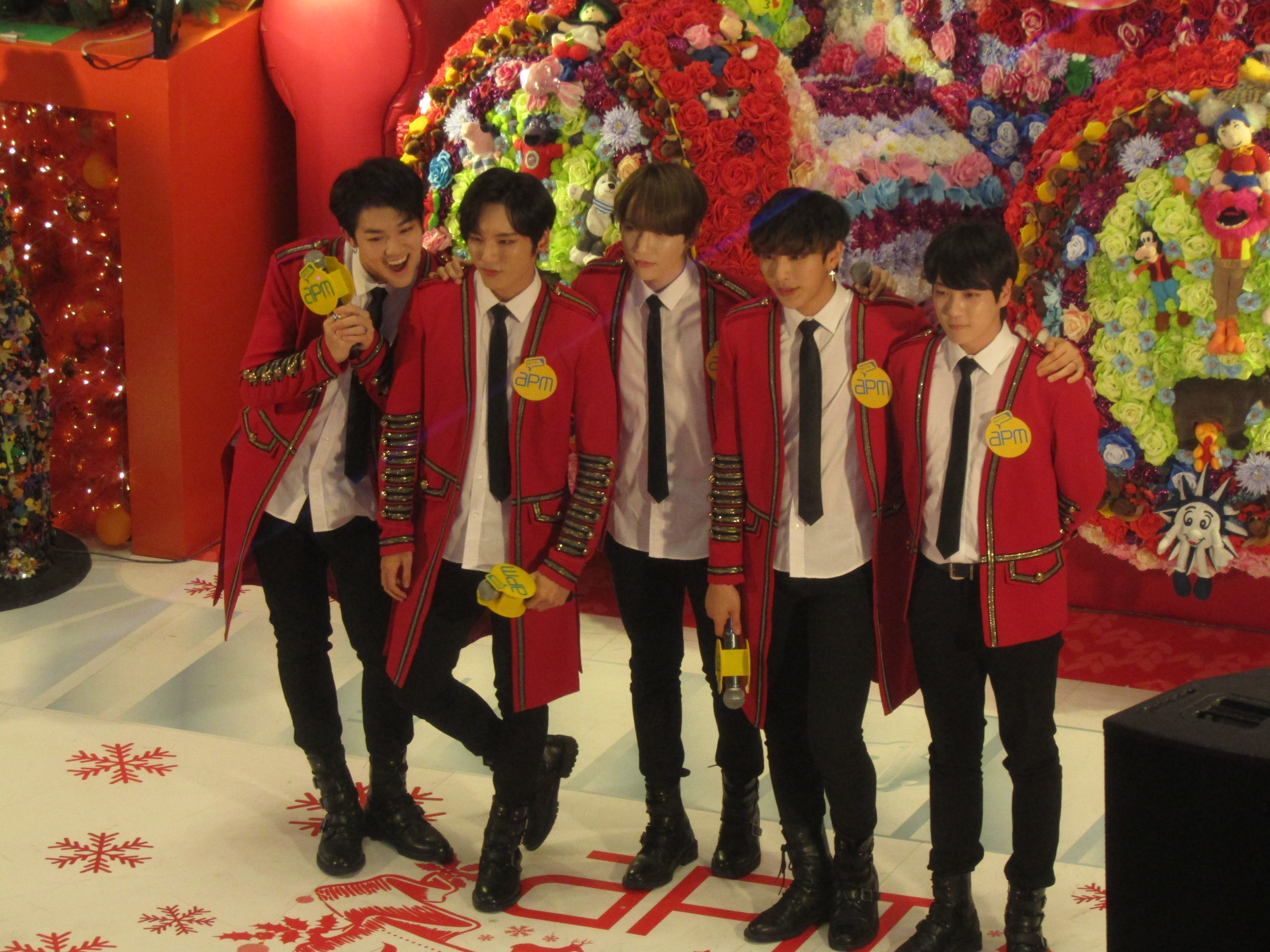
- From left to right: Benji (former), Gunmin, J-Hoon, Heedo, Minpyo (former).

Background information
- Also known as: Boys In Groove
- Origin: Seoul, South Korea
- Genres: K-pop; dance-pop; hip hop
- Years active: 2014–2024
- Labels: GH Entertainment; HY Entertainment
- Spinoffs: Gunmin X Heedo; Triple 7
- Members: J-Hoon; Gunmin; Heedo; Jinseok
- Past members: Benji; Minpyo
- Website: gh-ent.co.kr

B.I.G (Korean: 비아이지; also known as Boys In Groove), was a four member South Korean boy band formed by GH Entertainment in Seoul, South Korea. They debuted on July 9, 2014, with their first digital single "Hello".

== History ==
=== Pre-debut ===
All five members of B.I.G were trainees before becoming members of the group and have an average of three years training between them. Benji had previously been a student at Cleveland Institute of Music and Heifetz International Music Institute, and later attended Juilliard School, before dropping out in 2011 to pursue a music career in South Korea. He has been playing violin since he was four years of age and was a member of the Seattle Youth Symphony. Before joining GH Entertainment, Minpyo had been a Stardom Entertainment trainee and member of Topp Dogg's trainee group, Underdogg. Before debuting the members practiced together as a group for one and a half years.

=== 2014: Debut with "Hello" and "Are You Ready?" ===
On July 5, just days before B.I.G's debut, the group took to the streets of Myeongdong to perform. B.I.G's debut single, "Hello", and accompanying music video were released on July 9. The song garnered attention because of its high praising lyrics in regards to South Korea which highlight the culture and promote the country. The group performed their debut stage on SBS MTV's The Show on the day of their debut.

On October 16, B.I.G confirmed their second single, "Are You Ready?"'s upcoming release. The single was released on October 21. The group began promotions from October 22, with their comeback stage on MBC Music's Show Champion.

On December 12, B.I.G released their rendition of Wham!'s "Last Christmas" to thank their fans and celebrate their first Christmas as a group.

=== 2015: "Between Night n Music" and "Taola" ===
B.I.G announced their third single, "Between Night n Music", on March 3, accompanied by a selection of individual and group teasers images. The new single and accompanying music video were released on March 6.

On November 4, GH Entertainment announced that B.I.G would be joining the long list of November comebacks. The single, Big Transformer, including the title track "Taola" was released on November 19.

=== 2016: Japanese debut and Aphrodite ===
GH Entertainment confirmed in late January that B.I.G were preparing for their upcoming Japanese debut, with management from HY Entertainment. The group began promoting in Japan by holding showcases in Tokyo before their debut to help them become known. They officially debuted on March 23, with the Japanese version of "Taola", which peaked at number 15 on the Oricon weekly singles chart.

On May 10, B.I.G announced that their first mini-album, Aphrodite, would be released later that month. The mini-album and accompanying music video for title track of the same name, were released on May 17. Promotions for the album began on release day with a showcase on SBS MTV's The Show.

B.I.G held their first Japanese concerts, B.I.G Japan First Live, on June 17 and 18 at Harajuku's Astro Hall in Tokyo.

=== 2017: "1.2.3" and Hello Hello ===
On February 3, 2017, B.I.G announced their return with the fifth single, "1.2.3". The single entitled "B.I.G Rebirth" was released on February 13. The group promoted the single without rapper Minpyo, who was taking a break due to health problems.

On May 15, B.I.G announced their sixth single, Hello Hello, would be released of May 23. B.I.G held their first concert in South Korea entitled B.I.G Asia Tour in Seoul, on June 24, at the KBS Arena in Seoul. On July 5, B.I.G introduced a campaign song entitled "Remember", they released the digital single on July 7. In September B.I.G embarked or their first tour of Asia named The B.I.Ginning in which they played venues in Manila and Yokohama. Later that month they conducted their first overseas tour, the B.I.G Special Latin Tour, in Brazil, Chile and Mexico.

=== 2018–present: Addition of new member, Illusion, member departures and Mr. Big: Flashback ===
On November 15, 2018, the group's leader J-Hoon enlisted in the military.

On January 19, 2019, Jinseok was added to the group.

On November 4, 2019, the group released their seventh single, Illusion, in both Korean and Arabic, making them the first K-pop group to release a song in the language.

On September 30, 2020, Benji's contract with GH Entertainment ended and it was later announced that he had left the group.

On March 31, 2021, Minpyo's contract with GH Entertainment came to an end and it was later announced that he had left the group after choosing not to renew.

On August 10, 2021 B.I.G. and 3YE had a collaboration song titled "Presente." This group is known as Triple7.

On November 23, 2021, the group released their eighth single, Mr. Big: Flashback, which includes the single "Flashback".

== Members ==
=== Current ===
- J-Hoon (제이훈) – leader, vocalist
- Gunmin (건민) – vocalist, dancer
- Heedo (희도) – rapper
- Jinseok (진석) – vocalist

=== Former ===
- Benji (벤지) – vocalist
- Minpyo (민표) – rapper

== Discography ==
=== Extended plays ===
Title	Album details	Peak chart positions	Sales
Title	Album details	KOR	Sales
Aphrodite	Released: May 17, 2016; Label: GH Entertainment, CJ E&M; Formats: CD, digital download; Track listing: 1. Big Transformer; 2. Aphrodite (아프로디테); 3. Taola (타올라); 4. Right Now; 5. U Hear Me (듣고 있니); 6. Take You Home (데려다 줄게); 7. Aphrodite (아프로디테) (Inst.)	29	KOR: 795

=== Single albums ===
Title	Album details	Peak chart positions	Sales
Title	Album details	KOR	Sales
Hello Hello	Released: May 23, 2017; Label: GH Entertainment, CJ E&M; Formats: CD, digital download; Track listing: 1. Hello Hello; 2. Strange (낯설어); 3. 1.2.3; 4. Duet (듀엣) (Benji & Heyne); 5. Hello Hello (Inst.); 6. Strange (낯설어) (Inst.)	25	—N/a
Illusion	Released: November 4, 2019; Label: GH Entertainment, Sony Music; Formats: CD, digital download; Track listing: 1. Illusion; 2. Illusion (Arabic Version); 3. Illusion (Inst.)	60	KOR: 611

=== Singles ===
Title	Year	Peak chart positions		Album
Title	Year	KOR	JPN	Album
"Hello" (안녕하세요)	2014	—	—	Non-album singles
"Are You Ready?" (준비됐나요)	2014	—	—	Non-album singles
"Between Night n Music" (밤과 음악 사이)	2015	—	—	Non-album singles
"Taola" (타올라)	2015	—	15	Aphrodite
"Aphrodite" (아프로디테)	2016	—	—	Aphrodite
"1.2.3"	2017	—	—	Hello Hello
"Hello Hello"	2017	—	—	Hello Hello
"Illusion"	2019	—	—	Illusion
"Flashback"	2021	—	—	Mr. Big: Flashback
"Want"	2023	—	—	Non-album singles
Gunmin X Heedo (sub-unit)
"Don't Worry"	2018	—	—	Don't Worry
"—" denotes releases that did not chart.

==== Promotional singles ====
Year	Title
2014	"Last Christmas"
2017	"Remember" (기억할게요)

=== Soundtrack appearances ===
Year	Title	Drama
2016	"Hey Girl"	Moorim School OST

== Filmography ==
=== Reality shows ===
Year	Network	Title	Note(s)
2017	MBC Music	B.I.G Project	4 Episodes.

== Videography ==
=== Music videos ===
Year	Title	Director(s)
2014	"Hello"	Unknown
2014	"Are You Ready?"	Unknown
2015	"Between Night n Music"	Unknown
2015	"Taola"	Digipedi
2016	"Aphrodite"	Vikings League
2016	"Take You Home"	Unknown
2017	"1.2.3"	Vikings League
2017	"Hello Hello"	Unknown
2019	"Illusion"	Unknown
2021	"Presente" with 3YE (as Triple7)	ZanyBros

== Endorsements ==
In 2014, B.I.G were appointed ambassadors of the 2014 "Love Life while Walking Overnight" campaign and the 2014 Lifeline campaign. On March 15, 2016, the group became ambassadors for the National Unification Advisory Council. In 2017, the group was appointed ambassadors for the Korea Youth Association, the Seoul VA Regional Office and the Hope Apple Tree Youth Project.

== Awards and nominations ==
Award ceremony	Year	Category	Nominee/work	Result	Ref.
Korean Culture & Entertainment Awards	2014	New Artist Award	B.I.G	Won	
