= 3YE =

South Korean girl group

- Origin: Seoul, South Korea
- Genre: K-pop
- Years active: 2019–2024
- Label: GH Entertainment
- Past members: Yuji; Yurim; Haeun

3YE (Korean: 써드아이; pronounced Third Eye) was a South Korean girl group formed by GH Entertainment in 2019. The group debuted on May 21, 2019, with the digital single "DMT". They disbanded on November 14, 2024.

== History ==
Prior to the group's formation, all of the group's members were part of GH Entertainment's previous girl group Apple.B. Yuji had also participated in K-pop Star 2 and Kara Project before becoming a trainee under GH Entertainment. The trio debuted on May 21, 2019, with their first digital single, "DMT (Do Ma Thang)". Their second digital single, "OOMM (Out Of My Mind)", was released on September 17. In November, they won the Most Anticipated Idol Award at the KY Star Awards. Their third digital single, "Queen", was released on February 21, 2020, followed by their first EP, Triangle, on June 29. On July 14, they released the special summer single, "Like This Summer".

The group's fourth digital single, "Stalker", was released on April 1, 2021.

On August 10, 2021 B.I.G. and 3YE had a collaboration song titled "Presente." This group is known as Triple7.

The group's fifth digital single, LOCO was released on November 16, 2023.

== Members ==
- Yuji (유지)
- Yurim (유림)
- Haeun (하은)

== Discography ==
=== Extended plays ===
Title	Album details	Peak chart positions	Sales
Title	Album details	KOR	Sales
Triangle	Released: June 29, 2020; Label: GH Entertainment; Formats: CD, digital download	48	KOR: 1,500

=== Singles ===
Title	Year	Peak chart positions	Album
Title	Year	KOR	Album
"DMT (Do Ma Thang)"	2019	—	Triangle
"OOMM (Out Of My Mind)"	2019	—	Triangle
"Queen"	2020	—	Triangle
"Yessir"	2020	—	Triangle
"Like This Summer"	2020	—	Non-album single
"Stalker"	2021	—	Non-album single
"Presente" with B.I.G as Triple7	2021	—	Non-album single
"Loco"	2023	—	Non-album single
"—" denotes releases that did not chart or were not released in that region.

== Awards and nominations ==
Award ceremony	Year	Category	Nominee(s)/work(s)	Result	Ref.
KY Star Awards	2019	Most Anticipated Idol	3YE	Won	
