= Beatwin =

2014–2017 South Korean boy band

BEATWIN (비트윈)
- Origin: Seoul, South Korea
- Genres: K-pop; Dance-pop; Hip hop
- Years active: 2014–2017
- Labels: Elen Entertainment
- Past members: Sunhyeok; Youngjo; Sanggyu; Hyeontae; Yoonhoo; Seongho; Jungha
- Website: BEATWIN

Beatwin (Korean: 비트윈; pronounced Between; stylized as BEATWIN) was a South Korean boy band formed by Elen Entertainment (formerly Heavenly Star Content) in Seoul, South Korea. The group currently consists of two members: Sunhyeok and Youngho. They debuted on January 6, 2014 with the single "She's My Girl". Their fans are called "Trophy".

== Members ==
=== Current ===
- Sunhyeok (선혁)
- Youngho (영조)

=== Former ===
- Sanggyu (상규)
- Hyeontae (현태)
- Yoonhoo (윤후)
- Seongho (성호)
- Jungha (정하)

== Discography ==
=== Extended plays ===
| Title | Album details | Peak chart positions | Sales |
| Title | Album details | KOR | Sales |
|---|---|---|---|
| Insatiable | Released: August 29, 2015; Label: Elen Entertainment, LOEN Entertainment; Formats: CD, digital download; Track listing: 1. Attention; 2. Stalker (스토커); 3. Beautiful Night; 4. She’s My Girl (갖고싶니); 5. Illusion (일루션); 6. Stalker (스토커) inst. | 12 | KOR: 939+ |
| Come To Me | Released: July 19, 2016; Label: Elen Entertainment, Warner Music Korea; Formats: CD, digital download; Track listing: 1. Your Girl (니 여자친구); 2. Broken; 3. Boring (지겹다); 4. Attention Pt. 2; 5. Your Girl (니 여자친구) inst.; 6. Broken inst. | 25 | KOR: 701+ |

=== Singles ===
| Title | Year | Peak chart positions | Album |
| Title | Year | KOR | Album |
|---|---|---|---|
| "She’s My Girl" (갖고싶니) | 2014 | — | Non-album singles |
| "I, No" | 2014 | — | Non-album singles |
| "Illusion" (일루션) | 2014 | — | Non-album singles |
| "Stalker" (스토커) | 2015 | — | Insatiable |
| "Your Girl" (니 여자친구) | 2016 | — | Come To Me |
| "Rising Sun" (태양이 뜨면) | 2016 | — | Non-album singles |
| "Don’t Leave" (떠나지 말아요) | 2016 | — | Non-album singles |
"—" denotes releases that did not chart.
