= List of The Unit: Idol Rebooting Project contestants =

The Unit: Idol Rebooting Project is a South Korean reality television show.

== Contestants ==
After the 4th episode was aired, I left the show due to health problems.

Age is shown according to Korean age system.

Color key

- Disbanded
- Left the group prior to show
- Left the show
- Top 9 of the week
- Eliminated in Episode 7
- Eliminated in Episode 11
- Eliminated in Episode 14
- Eliminated in Episode 15
- Debut Team

=== Unit B ===
Current Agency	Debut Group	Name	Age	Boots	Ranking								
Current Agency	Debut Group	Name	Age	Boots	Ep.4	Ep.5	Ep.7	Ep.8	Ep.11	Ep.12	Ep.14	Ep.15	Final
Current Agency	Debut Group	Name	Age	Boots	#	#	#	#	#	#	#	#	#
Individual Trainee	Cross Gene	Casper (캐스퍼)	27	6 Boots	46	41	37	37	45				45
Individual Trainee	Day6	Im Junhyeok (임준혁)	25	4 Boots	31	33	34	38	41	32	32		32
Individual Trainee	Madtown	Daewon (대원)	26	1 Boot	13	9	8	8	8	10	9	7	7
Individual Trainee	Madtown	Lee Geon (이건)	26	6 Boots	22	23	22	20	15	18	17	18	18
Beat Interactive	A.C.E	Chan (찬)	20	4 Boots	26	27	26	19	17	14	15	9	9
Beat Interactive	A.C.E	Jun (준)	23	4 Boots	30	28	25	25	23	20	21		21
Brand New Music	Troy (band)	Kanto (칸토)	24	6 Boots	9	11	12	9	12	17	20		20
Brave Entertainment	Bigstar	Feeldog (필독)	26	6 Boots	3	4	4	3	4	4	4	4	4
Brave Entertainment	Bigstar	Raehwan (래환)	26	2 Boots	14	14	20	22	25	28	22		22
Brave Entertainment	Bigstar	Sunghak (성학)	25	3 Boots	34	42	44	41	42				42
Brave Entertainment	Bigstar	Jude (주드)	24	3 Boots	51	55	53						53
DSP Media	A-JAX	Seungjin (승진)	24	Super Boot	38	38	38	42	43				43
DSP Media	A-JAX	Junghee (중희)	23	Super Boot	45	50	50						50
Elen Entertainment	Beatwin	Jungha (정하)	25	1 Boot	42	44	41	24	24	29	30		30
Elen Entertainment	Beatwin	Seongho (성호)^{1}	22	1 Boot	54	56	58						58
GH Entertainment	B.I.G	Heedo (희도)	22	3 Boots	33	35	35	29	28	27	28		28
GH Entertainment	B.I.G	Gunmin (건민)	24	0 Boot	25	26	24	30	32				33
H2 Media	Myname	Seyong (세용)	27	5 Boots	10	12	13	11	14	9	8	17	17
H2 Media	Myname	Jun.Q (준Q)	25	4 Boots	16	18	17	15	20	25	24		24
H2 Media	Myname	Gunwoo (건우)	29	3 Boots	18	21	29	32	36				37
H2 Media	Myname	Chaejin (채진)	23	4 Boots	24	25	27	33	37				38
HO Company	BIGFLO	Euijin (의진)	28	5 Boots	17	16	9	4	2	1	2	2	2
HO Company	BIGFLO	Lex (렉스)	25	0 Boot	49	53	45	45	44				44
HO Company	BIGFLO	Z-Uk (지욱)^{2}	25	2 Boots	63	60	56						56
Hunus Entertainment	Topp Dogg	B-Joo (비주)	24	3 Boots	36	32	30	31	30	26	25		25
Hunus Entertainment	Topp Dogg	Hojoon (호준)	26	1 Boot	27	29	31	34	38				39
JFLO Entertainment	Newkidd	Ji Hansol (지한솔)^{3}	24	Super Boot	5	6	7	12	10	12	6	6	6
JSL Company	TOPSECRET	Kyungha (경하)	20	5 Boots	29	39	47						47
JSL Company	TOPSECRET	Junghoon (정훈)	22	3 Boots	62	62	63						63
MBK Entertainment	Speed	Sejun (세준)	25	2 Boots	43	47	51						51
Namoo Actors	Trainee	Lee Jungha (이정하)	20	4 Boots	15	15	15	17	21	22	19		19
NH Media	U-KISS	Jun (준)	21	Super Boot	6	3	2	1	1	2	1	1	1
Ph Entertainment	MVP	Rayoon (라윤)	24	5 Boots	39	37	33	27	27	31	31		31
Ph Entertainment	MVP	P.K (피케이)	24	5 Boots	52	57	55						55
Ph Entertainment	MVP	Jin (진)	23	1 Boot	53	63	62						62
Rainbow Entertainment	Hot Blood Youth	Marco (마르코)	25	6 Boots	12	13	14	14	19	15	16	5	5
Rainbow Entertainment	Hot Blood Youth	Taro (타로)	24	0 Boot	57	54	52						52
RBW Entertainment	MAS	Dongmyeong (동명)^{5}	18	2 Boots	8	10	16	16	13	13	14	16	16
RBW Entertainment	MAS	Harin (하린)	20	2 Boots	50	52	54						54
RBW Entertainment	MAS	Yonghoon (용훈)	24	2 Boots	58	58	59						59
RBW Entertainment	MAS	CyA (키아)	18	2 Boots	60	59	60						60
RBW Entertainment	MAS	Kanghyun (강현)	20	2 Boots	56	61	61						61
Star Crew Entertainment	Hotshot	Go Hojung (고호정)	24	Super Boot	4	5	5	6	6	5	3	3	3
Star Crew Entertainment	Hotshot	Kim Timoteo (김티모테오)	25	Super Boot	1	1	1	5	5	3	5	10	10
Star Empire Entertainment	Imfact	Jeup (제업)	25	1 Boot	40	22	10	13	9	8	11	11	11
Star Empire Entertainment	Imfact	Ungjae (웅재)	20	4 Boots	23	17	19	23	22	23	26		26
Star Empire Entertainment	Imfact	Taeho (태호)	25	2 Boots	47	45	42	36	26	24	27		27
Star Empire Entertainment	Imfact	Jian (지안)	25	2 Boots	59	51	49						49
Starship Entertainment	Boyfriend	Donghyun (동현)	29	6 Boots	2	2	3	2	3	6	7	12	12
TOP Media	100%	Rockhyun (록현)	27	6 Boots	11	8	11	10	11	11	12	14	14
TOP Media	100%	Hyukjin (혁진)	25	0 Boot	20	19	21	28	34				35
Universal Music	Boys Republic	Suwoong (수웅)	23	2 Boots	21	24	18	18	16	16	18	15	15
Universal Music	Boys Republic	Sungjun (성준)	26	2 Boots	41	34	36	44	31	30	29		29
Universal Music	Boys Republic	Onejunn (원준)	30	2 Boots	48	48	57						57
Widmay Entertainment	Snuper	Sangil (상일)	25	2 Boots	37	40	39	35	33				34
Widmay Entertainment	Snuper	Suhyun (수현)	26	2 Boots	44	43	43	40	39				40
Widmay Entertainment	Snuper	Sebin (세빈)	22	1 Boot	32	36	46						46
Wings Entertainment	A.cian	Jungsang (정상)	27	4 Boots	28	31	32	39	35				36
Wings Entertainment	A.cian	Jin.O (진오)	25	0 Boot	61	49	48						48
Yama & Hotchicks	IM	Kijoong (기중)	17	Super Boot	7	7	6	7	7	7	10	8	8
Yama & Hotchicks	IM	Hangyul (한결)	19	Super Boot	35	30	28	21	18	19	13	13	13
Yama & Hotchicks	IM	Kiseok (기석)^{4}	21	Super Boot	19	20	23	26	29	21	23		23
Yama & Hotchicks	IM	Taeeun (태은)	18	Super Boot	55	46	40	43	40				41

=== Unit G ===
Current Agency	Debut Group	Name	Age	Boots	Ranking								
Current Agency	Debut Group	Name	Age	Boots	Ep.4	Ep.5	Ep.7	Ep.8	Ep.11	Ep.12	Ep.14	Ep.15	Final
Current Agency	Debut Group	Name	Age	Boots	#	#	#	#	#	#	#	#	#
Individual Trainee	Hello Venus	Yoonjo (윤조)	26	0 Boot	23	19	14	7	7	13	12	4	4
Individual Trainee	Spica	Yang Jiwon (양지원)	30	Super Boot	1	1	1	4	5	4	8	6	6
Apple of The Eye Ent.	The Ark	Lee Suji (이수지)	20	5 Boots	11	9	9	9	10	7	5	9	9
Brand New Music	Miss $	Kang Minhee (강민희)	27	4 Boots	20	31	34	33	34				34
Brave Entertainment	Brave Girls	Yujeong (유정)	27	5 Boots	33	32	26	32	37				37
Brave Entertainment	Brave Girls	Eunji (은지)	26	1 Boot	41	37	45						48
Box Media	Matilda	Semmi (세미)	23	4 Boots	49	53	42	29	9	5	2	13	13
Box Media	Matilda	Dan-A (단아)	25	4 Boots	28	26	23	37	30	14	13	14	14
Box Media	Matilda	Haena (해나)^{6}	27	3 Boots	46	48	52	41	40				40
Box Media	Matilda	Saebyul (새별)	22	2 Boots	57	45	49						52
C9 Entertainment	Good Day	Jiwon (지원)	19	5 Boots	15	13	10	8	6	8	6	11	11
C9 Entertainment	Good Day	Lucky (럭키)	17	0 Boot	22	20	19	19	17	18	24		24
C9 Entertainment	Good Day	Heejin (희진)^{7}	23	4 Boots	37	42	39	36	31	28	28		28
C9 Entertainment	Good Day	Viva (비바)	18	3 Boots	52	47	40	24	29	30	29		29
C9 Entertainment	Good Day	Genie (지니)	21	2 Boots	59	49	46						49
C9 Entertainment	Good Day	Chaesol (채솔)	20	1 Boot	50	54	57						58
CLIMIX Entertainment	S2	Yujeong (유정)	19	1 Boot	61	60	54						55
CLIMIX Entertainment	S2	Chaewon (채원)	25	6 Boots	63	61	62						62
Cre.ker Entertainment	Melody Day	Chahee (차희)	22	Super Boot	34	28	31	35	18	16	17	16	16
Cre.ker Entertainment	Melody Day	Yeoeun (여은)	28	Super Boot	18	18	15	12	13	15	15	18	18
Cre.ker Entertainment	Melody Day	Yoomin (유민)	25	Super Boot	32	23	24	31	22	31	31		31
Cube Entertainment	Trainee	Lee Joohyun (이주현)	14	6 Boots	38	34	29	23	25	21	25		25
Dal&Byul Music	WINGS	Yeseul (예슬)	28	3 Boots	53	52	51	44	41				41
Double X Entertainment	S.I.S	Anne (앤)	18	5 Boots	36	36	28	22	26	19	22		22
Double X Entertainment	S.I.S	Gaeul (가을)	20	2 Boots	25	22	35	40	39				39
Double X Entertainment	S.I.S	Sebin (세빈)	17	0 Boot	47	50	55						56
DSP Media	April	Lee Hyunjoo (이현주)	20	6 Boots	9	6	7	5	8	9	10	5	5
DWM Entertainment	T-ara	Han Ahreum (한아름)	24	2 Boots	27	33	37	42	44				44
Elijah Entertainment	G-reyish	Yena (예나)	18	6 Boots	43	38	33	39	32	32	32		32
FNC GTC Shanghai	ACEMAX-RED	Lena	20	1 Boot	48	39	44						47
FNC GTC Shanghai	ACEMAX-RED	Bomi	23	6 Boots	54	51	50						53
GH Entertainment	Soloist	Soya (소야)^{8}	28	6 Boots	29	35	43						46
GH Entertainment	APPLE.B	Sandy (샌디)	20	2 Boots	55	56	56						57
GH Entertainment	APPLE.B	Yooji (유지)^{9}	20	3 Boots	51	55	58						59
Global H Media	Laboum	ZN (지엔)	24	3 Boots	17	16	13	14	14	12	11	8	8
Global H Media	Laboum	Yujeong (유정)	26	4 Boots	12	12	12	17	15	17	20		20
Global H Media	Laboum	Haein (해인)	23	5 Boots	24	21	18	18	19	23	26		26
Happy Face Entertainment	Dal Shabet	Woohee (우희)	27	6 Boots	6	7	6	10	11	10	9	7	7
Happy Face Entertainment	Dal Shabet	Serri (세리)	28	6 Boots	13	29	32	30	28	29	23		23
Hoonstar Entertainment	S.E.T	Eun.E (은이)	23	0 Boot	62	62	61	45	45				45
Hoonstar Entertainment	S.E.T	Tae.E (태이)	17	0 Boot	60	59	60						61
Hyunda Company	BabyBoo	Dabin (다빈)	21	6 Boots	40	43	48						51
JJ Holic Media	Soloist	NC.A (앤씨아)	22	Super Boot	4	5	4	3	3	3	4	3	3
JSL Company	Tiny-G	Mint (민트)	24	4 Boots	26	24	27	28	38				38
Mafia Records	Wa$$up	Nari (나리)	26	6 Boots	21	15	22	27	27	25	21		21
Maroo Entertainment	The Ark	Euna Kim (유나킴)^{10}	24	5 Boots	3	4	5	6	4	6	7	10	10
MBK Entertainment	DIA	Yebin (예빈)	21	3 Boots	2	3	3	2	2	2	3	2	2
MBK Entertainment	DIA	Somyi (솜이)	18	3 Boots	10	10	11	11	12	11	14	12	12
MBK Entertainment	GP Basic	Janey (제이니)^{11}	20	5 Boots	35	40	36	38	43				43
MBK Entertainment	The SeeYa	Han Seoin (한서인)	24	2 Boots	45	46	47						50
Namoo Actors	Actress and Model	Park Jiwon (박지원)	21	6 Boots	42	44	41	43	42				42
New Planet Entertainment	H.U.B	Hyosun (효선)^{12}	20	3 Boots	7	8	8	13	20	20	19		19
Snowball Entertainment	Actress and Model	Lee Borim (이보림)	23	4 Boots	44	25	17	16	16	24	18	17	17
Soul Shop Entertainment	Real Girls Project	Kwon Haseo (권하서)	24	4 Boots	31	30	30	26	36				36
Starline Entertainment	Soloist	Shin Jihoon (신지훈)^{13}	20	4 Boots	14	17	16	15	21	22	16	15	15
TS Entertainment	Sonamoo	Euijin (의진)	22	4 Boots	5	2	2	1	1	1	1	1	1
TSM Entertainment	Soloist	Seol Hayoon (설하윤)	26	6 Boots	16	14	21	25	35				35
Universal Music Group	Rubber Soul	Kim (킴)	25	6 Boots	39	41	38	34	23	27	30		30
WM Entertainment	Soloist	I (아이)^{14}	22	6 Boots	19								
Woollim Entertainment	Soloist	Joo (주)	28	6 Boots	8	11	20	20	33				33
YNB Entertainment	Bestie	Hyeyeon (혜연)	28	1 Boot	30	27	25	21	24	26	27		27
Zenith Media Contents	LipBubble	Hanbi (한비)	16	2 Boots	56	57	53						54
Zenith Media Contents	LipBubble	Eunbyul (은별)	18	0 Boot	58	58	59						60

== First Mission: The Music Video ==
After the Booting Evaluations, the contestants were tasked to form groups with nine members for the first mission. The winning team of each gender would become the center team in the music video of the show's theme song "My Turn".

=== Unit B Evaluations ===
Team ^{15}	Place	Members
White	4	Jungha (Center), Daewon (Leader), Jian, Suhyun, Dongmyeong, Yonghoon, Cya, Kanghyun, Harin
Orange	7	Taeho (Center), Casper (Leader), Ungjae, Z-Uk, Chaejin, Jun-Q, Hyukjin, Lee Jungha, Marco
Green	5	Jun (U-Kiss) (Center), Hojoon (Leader), B-Joo, Taro, Heedo, Lex, Jin-O, Seungjin, Joonghee
Black	2	Jun (A.C.E) (Center and Leader), Chan, P.K, Rayoon, Jin, Taeeun, Jungsang, Sangil, Junhyeok
Red	1	Kijung (Center), Donghyun (Leader), Feeldog, Rockhyeon, Kim Timoteo, Lee Geon, Ji Hansol, Kanto, Go Hojung
Blue	6	Seyong (Center and Leader), Gunwoo, Jude, Euijin, One Junn, Kyeongha, Junghoon, Giseok, Sebin
Yellow	3	Hangyul (Center), Raehwan (Leader), Sunghak, Gunmin, Sungjun, Suwoong, Sejun, Seongho, Jeup

=== Unit G Evaluations ===
Team ^{15}	Place	Members
Black	3	Serri (Center), Yang Jiwon (Leader), Woohee, Nari, Yujeong (Laboum), ZN, Dan-A, Haena, Park Jiwon
White	2	Anne (Center), Haein (Leader), Gaeul, Lee Suji, Euna Kim, Jiwon, Chaesol, Janey, Yujeong (Brave Girls)
Orange	7	Lee Hyunjoo (Center), Han Areum (Leader), Kim, Seol Hayoon, Mint, Dabin, Hyosun, Bomi, Lee Juhyun
Red	1	Euijin (Center), Eunji (Leader), Yebin, Somyi, Yeoeun, Chahee, Yoomin, Han Seoin, Lee Borim
Green	4	Cha Yunji (Center), Hyeyeon (Leader), Yoonjo, NC.A, Chaewon, Saebyeol, Semmi, Genie, Viva
Blue	6	Sandy (Center), Joo (Leader), Yooji, Yeseul, Soya, Lena, Kwon Haseo, Lucky, Shin Jihoon
Yellow	5	Yena (Center), Kang Minhee (Leader), Eunbyeol, Hanbi, Tae.E, Eun.E, Yujeong (S2), Heejin, Sebin

== Second Mission: Restart Mission ==
Contestants will choose one of the given songs of different concepts that they are confident in; new teams of nine are formed. Voting of each contestant is conducted during the performances. The winning team with the most votes will win a benefit of immunity from elimination in the first elimination round, regardless of overall vote rankings of the show, plus the chance to perform in Rain's comeback stage.

=== UNI+ G ===
Color key

- Leader
- Highest Score
- Lowest Score
- Highest Score Overall

# ^{16}	Team	Song	Artist	Votes	Total	Result
1	Black	"Rough" by GFriend	NC.A	267	1,266	5th Place
1	Black	"Rough" by GFriend	Gaeul	161	1,266	5th Place
1	Black	"Rough" by GFriend	Shin Jihoon	142	1,266	5th Place
1	Black	"Rough" by GFriend	Chahee	141	1,266	5th Place
1	Black	"Rough" by GFriend	Lee Joohyun	131	1,266	5th Place
1	Black	"Rough" by GFriend	Lee Hyunjoo	127	1,266	5th Place
1	Black	"Rough" by GFriend	Eunji	116	1,266	5th Place
1	Black	"Rough" by GFriend	Han Seo In	98	1,266	5th Place
1	Black	"Rough" by GFriend	Genie	83	1,266	5th Place
2	Blue	"Crazy" by 4Minute	Hyosun	273	1,635	2nd Place
2	Blue	"Crazy" by 4Minute	Euna Kim	223	1,635	2nd Place
2	Blue	"Crazy" by 4Minute	Nari	196	1,635	2nd Place
2	Blue	"Crazy" by 4Minute	Serri	183	1,635	2nd Place
2	Blue	"Crazy" by 4Minute	Dabin	171	1,635	2nd Place
2	Blue	"Crazy" by 4Minute	Mint	170	1,635	2nd Place
2	Blue	"Crazy" by 4Minute	Euijin	165	1,635	2nd Place
2	Blue	"Crazy" by 4Minute	Viva	146	1,635	2nd Place
2	Blue	"Crazy" by 4Minute	Saebyeol	108	1,635	2nd Place
3	Yellow	"Heart Attack" by AOA	Shin Yoonjo	172	929	7th Place
3	Yellow	"Heart Attack" by AOA	Yoomin	159	929	7th Place
3	Yellow	"Heart Attack" by AOA	Somyi	122	929	7th Place
3	Yellow	"Heart Attack" by AOA	Lena	98	929	7th Place
3	Yellow	"Heart Attack" by AOA	Park Jiwon	88	929	7th Place
3	Yellow	"Heart Attack" by AOA	Yena	84	929	7th Place
3	Yellow	"Heart Attack" by AOA	Tae.E	80	929	7th Place
3	Yellow	"Heart Attack" by AOA	Yujeong (S2)	67	929	7th Place
3	Yellow	"Heart Attack" by AOA	Eunbyeol	59	929	7th Place
4	Orange	"Red Flavor" by Red Velvet	Jiwon	271	1,138	6th Place
4	Orange	"Red Flavor" by Red Velvet	Cha Yunji	159	1,138	6th Place
4	Orange	"Red Flavor" by Red Velvet	Yebin	151	1,138	6th Place
4	Orange	"Red Flavor" by Red Velvet	Lee Suji	137	1,138	6th Place
4	Orange	"Red Flavor" by Red Velvet	Yujeong (Brave Girls)	98	1,138	6th Place
4	Orange	"Red Flavor" by Red Velvet	Sebin	89	1,138	6th Place
4	Orange	"Red Flavor" by Red Velvet	Yooji	87	1,138	6th Place
4	Orange	"Red Flavor" by Red Velvet	Dan-A	78	1,138	6th Place
4	Orange	"Red Flavor" by Red Velvet	Lucky	69	1,138	6th Place
5	Green	"You're The Best" by Mamamoo	Yang Jiwon	302	1,947	1st Place
5	Green	"You're The Best" by Mamamoo	Eun.E	285	1,947	1st Place
5	Green	"You're The Best" by Mamamoo	Heejin	248	1,947	1st Place
5	Green	"You're The Best" by Mamamoo	Kang Minhee	223	1,947	1st Place
5	Green	"You're The Best" by Mamamoo	Haena	208	1,947	1st Place
5	Green	"You're The Best" by Mamamoo	Joo	191	1,947	1st Place
5	Green	"You're The Best" by Mamamoo	Hyeyeon	189	1,947	1st Place
5	Green	"You're The Best" by Mamamoo	Han Ahreum	152	1,947	1st Place
5	Green	"You're The Best" by Mamamoo	Yeseul	149	1,947	1st Place
6	White	"Give It to Me" by Sistar	Yeoeun	280	1,389	3rd Place
6	White	"Give It to Me" by Sistar	Seol Hayoon	208	1,389	3rd Place
6	White	"Give It to Me" by Sistar	Semmi	203	1,389	3rd Place
6	White	"Give It to Me" by Sistar	Chaewon	156	1,389	3rd Place
6	White	"Give It to Me" by Sistar	Kwon Haseo	150	1,389	3rd Place
6	White	"Give It to Me" by Sistar	Haein	147	1,389	3rd Place
6	White	"Give It to Me" by Sistar	Janey	118	1,389	3rd Place
6	White	"Give It to Me" by Sistar	Kim	82	1,389	3rd Place
6	White	"Give It to Me" by Sistar	Bomi	45	1,389	3rd Place
7	Red	"Gee" by Girls' Generation	Woohee	228	1,337	4th Place
7	Red	"Gee" by Girls' Generation	ZN	218	1,337	4th Place
7	Red	"Gee" by Girls' Generation	Yujeong (Laboum)	185	1,337	4th Place
7	Red	"Gee" by Girls' Generation	Soya	181	1,337	4th Place
7	Red	"Gee" by Girls' Generation	Chaesol	121	1,337	4th Place
7	Red	"Gee" by Girls' Generation	Anne	115	1,337	4th Place
7	Red	"Gee" by Girls' Generation	Lee Borim	113	1,337	4th Place
7	Red	"Gee" by Girls' Generation	Hanbi	112	1,337	4th Place
7	Red	"Gee" by Girls' Generation	Sandy	64	1,337	4th Place

=== UNI+ B ===
Color key

- Leader
- Highest Score
- Lowest Score
- Highest Score Overall

# ^{16}	Team	Song	Artist	Votes	Total	Result
1	White	"Fire" by BTS	Suwoong	246	1,247	2nd Place
1	White	"Fire" by BTS	JunQ	149	1,247	2nd Place
1	White	"Fire" by BTS	Sungjun	145	1,247	2nd Place
1	White	"Fire" by BTS	Hangyul	140	1,247	2nd Place
1	White	"Fire" by BTS	Ungjae	137	1,247	2nd Place
1	White	"Fire" by BTS	Taeeun	125	1,247	2nd Place
1	White	"Fire" by BTS	Jungsang	110	1,247	2nd Place
1	White	"Fire" by BTS	Taeho	100	1,247	2nd Place
1	White	"Fire" by BTS	Jude	95	1,247	2nd Place
2	Green	"Heartbeat" by 2PM	Seyong	220	1,199	4th Place
2	Green	"Heartbeat" by 2PM	Jungha	147	1,199	4th Place
2	Green	"Heartbeat" by 2PM	Sangil	145	1,199	4th Place
2	Green	"Heartbeat" by 2PM	Euijin	140	1,199	4th Place
2	Green	"Heartbeat" by 2PM	Sebin	135	1,199	4th Place
2	Green	"Heartbeat" by 2PM	Casper	117	1,199	4th Place
2	Green	"Heartbeat" by 2PM	Hyukjin	111	1,199	4th Place
2	Green	"Heartbeat" by 2PM	Gunwoo	97	1,199	4th Place
2	Green	"Heartbeat" by 2PM	Seongho	87	1,199	4th Place
3	Orange	"Monster" by EXO	Donghyun	222	1,438	1st Place
3	Orange	"Monster" by EXO	Timoteo	166	1,438	1st Place
3	Orange	"Monster" by EXO	Raehwan	160	1,438	1st Place
3	Orange	"Monster" by EXO	Lee Geon	157	1,438	1st Place
3	Orange	"Monster" by EXO	Ji Hansol	157	1,438	1st Place
3	Orange	"Monster" by EXO	Jeup	150	1,438	1st Place
3	Orange	"Monster" by EXO	Gunmin	145	1,438	1st Place
3	Orange	"Monster" by EXO	Rockhyun	142	1,438	1st Place
3	Orange	"Monster" by EXO	Jun (A.C.E)	139	1,438	1st Place
4	Yellow	"Juliette" by Shinee	Kijung	176	1,183	5th Place
4	Yellow	"Juliette" by Shinee	Marco	158	1,183	5th Place
4	Yellow	"Juliette" by Shinee	Chaejin	150	1,183	5th Place
4	Yellow	"Juliette" by Shinee	Go Hojung	146	1,183	5th Place
4	Yellow	"Juliette" by Shinee	Dongmyeong	146	1,183	5th Place
4	Yellow	"Juliette" by Shinee	Sunghak	108	1,183	5th Place
4	Yellow	"Juliette" by Shinee	Jin	104	1,183	5th Place
4	Yellow	"Juliette" by Shinee	Lex	101	1,183	5th Place
4	Yellow	"Juliette" by Shinee	Hojoon	94	1,183	5th Place
5	Red	"Perfect Man" by Shinhwa	Jun (U-Kiss)	224	1,232	3rd Place
5	Red	"Perfect Man" by Shinhwa	Chan	188	1,232	3rd Place
5	Red	"Perfect Man" by Shinhwa	Lee Jungha	162	1,232	3rd Place
5	Red	"Perfect Man" by Shinhwa	Rayoon	136	1,232	3rd Place
5	Red	"Perfect Man" by Shinhwa	Im Junhyeok	124	1,232	3rd Place
5	Red	"Perfect Man" by Shinhwa	Onejunn	113	1,232	3rd Place
5	Red	"Perfect Man" by Shinhwa	P.K	112	1,232	3rd Place
5	Red	"Perfect Man" by Shinhwa	Jin.O	108	1,232	3rd Place
5	Red	"Perfect Man" by Shinhwa	Harin	65	1,232	3rd Place
6	Black	"Boom Boom" by Seventeen	Feeldog	241	1,138	6th Place
6	Black	"Boom Boom" by Seventeen	Giseok	130	1,138	6th Place
6	Black	"Boom Boom" by Seventeen	Seungjin	125	1,138	6th Place
6	Black	"Boom Boom" by Seventeen	Daewon	124	1,138	6th Place
6	Black	"Boom Boom" by Seventeen	B-Joo	124	1,138	6th Place
6	Black	"Boom Boom" by Seventeen	Joonghee	109	1,138	6th Place
6	Black	"Boom Boom" by Seventeen	Heedo	107	1,138	6th Place
6	Black	"Boom Boom" by Seventeen	Kyeongha	100	1,138	6th Place
6	Black	"Boom Boom" by Seventeen	Jian	78	1,138	6th Place
7	Blue	"H.E.R" by Block B	Kanto	214	1,044	7th Place
7	Blue	"H.E.R" by Block B	Suhyun	125	1,044	7th Place
7	Blue	"H.E.R" by Block B	Taro	124	1,044	7th Place
7	Blue	"H.E.R" by Block B	Sejun	122	1,044	7th Place
7	Blue	"H.E.R" by Block B	Z-Uk	101	1,044	7th Place
7	Blue	"H.E.R" by Block B	Yonghoon	96	1,044	7th Place
7	Blue	"H.E.R" by Block B	Junghoon	90	1,044	7th Place
7	Blue	"H.E.R" by Block B	Cya	88	1,044	7th Place
7	Blue	"H.E.R" by Block B	Kanghyun	84	1,044	7th Place

== Third Mission: Self-producing ==
Contestants will be grouped based on the following categories: Vocal, Rap-Vocal and Performance. All performances are self-arranged by the contestants themselves, with live band accompaniments for the Vocal and Rap-Vocal categories. The mission will be based on a rival match basis. Voting of each contestant is conducted during the performances. The top 3 members of the winning team for each category will win a benefit of immunity from elimination in the 2nd elimination round, regardless of overall vote rankings of the show.

=== UNI+ B ===
Color key

- Leader
- Winning Team

Category	Individual Rank	Song	Artists				Song
Category	Individual Rank	Song	Winning Team		Losing Team		Song
Vocal	1st	"U R" by Taeyeon	Rockhyun	Yellow (321 votes)	Green (317 votes)	Jeup	"Miracles in December" by EXO
Vocal	2nd	"U R" by Taeyeon	Dongmyeong	Yellow (321 votes)	Green (317 votes)	Lee Geon	"Miracles in December" by EXO
Vocal	3rd	"U R" by Taeyeon	Im Junhyeok	Yellow (321 votes)	Green (317 votes)	Hyukjin	"Miracles in December" by EXO
Vocal	4th	"U R" by Taeyeon	Lex	Yellow (321 votes)	Green (317 votes)	Chaejin	"Miracles in December" by EXO
Vocal	5th	"U R" by Taeyeon	Taeho	Yellow (321 votes)	Green (317 votes)	Jungsang	"Miracles in December" by EXO
Vocal	6th	"U R" by Taeyeon	Suhyun	Yellow (321 votes)	Green (317 votes)	Sangil	"Miracles in December" by EXO
Performance	1st	"Stay" by Zedd and Alessia Cara + "Chained Up" by VIXX	Euijin	Black (315 votes)	Red (306 votes)	Seyong	"Manners Maketh Man" from Kingsman: The Secret Service soundtrack + "That's What I Like" by Bruno Mars
Performance	2nd	"Stay" by Zedd and Alessia Cara + "Chained Up" by VIXX	Ji Hansol	Black (315 votes)	Red (306 votes)	Feeldog	"Manners Maketh Man" from Kingsman: The Secret Service soundtrack + "That's What I Like" by Bruno Mars
Performance	3rd	"Stay" by Zedd and Alessia Cara + "Chained Up" by VIXX	Timoteo	Black (315 votes)	Red (306 votes)	Go Hojung	"Manners Maketh Man" from Kingsman: The Secret Service soundtrack + "That's What I Like" by Bruno Mars
Performance	4th	"Stay" by Zedd and Alessia Cara + "Chained Up" by VIXX	Hangyul	Black (315 votes)	Red (306 votes)	Kijoong	"Manners Maketh Man" from Kingsman: The Secret Service soundtrack + "That's What I Like" by Bruno Mars
Performance	5th	"Stay" by Zedd and Alessia Cara + "Chained Up" by VIXX	B-Joo	Black (315 votes)	Red (306 votes)	Daewon	"Manners Maketh Man" from Kingsman: The Secret Service soundtrack + "That's What I Like" by Bruno Mars
Performance	6th	"Stay" by Zedd and Alessia Cara + "Chained Up" by VIXX	Sunghak	Black (315 votes)	Red (306 votes)	Jun (A.C.E)	"Manners Maketh Man" from Kingsman: The Secret Service soundtrack + "That's What I Like" by Bruno Mars
Performance	7th	"Stay" by Zedd and Alessia Cara + "Chained Up" by VIXX	Gunmin	Black (315 votes)	Red (306 votes)	Sungjun	"Manners Maketh Man" from Kingsman: The Secret Service soundtrack + "That's What I Like" by Bruno Mars
Performance	8th	"Stay" by Zedd and Alessia Cara + "Chained Up" by VIXX	Seungjin	Black (315 votes)	Red (306 votes)	Rayoon	"Manners Maketh Man" from Kingsman: The Secret Service soundtrack + "That's What I Like" by Bruno Mars
Performance	9th	"Stay" by Zedd and Alessia Cara + "Chained Up" by VIXX	Hojoon	Black (315 votes)	Red (306 votes)	Taeeun	"Manners Maketh Man" from Kingsman: The Secret Service soundtrack + "That's What I Like" by Bruno Mars
Rap-Vocal	1st	"Butterfly" by BTS	Jun (U-Kiss)	Orange (291 votes)	Blue (282 votes)	Jungha	"Bermuda Triangle" by Zico featuring Dean, Crush + "Red Sun" by Hangzoo featuring Zico, Swings
Rap-Vocal	2nd	"Butterfly" by BTS	Suwoong	Orange (291 votes)	Blue (282 votes)	Chan	"Bermuda Triangle" by Zico featuring Dean, Crush + "Red Sun" by Hangzoo featuring Zico, Swings
Rap-Vocal	3rd	"Butterfly" by BTS	Casper	Orange (291 votes)	Blue (282 votes)	Donghyun	"Bermuda Triangle" by Zico featuring Dean, Crush + "Red Sun" by Hangzoo featuring Zico, Swings
Rap-Vocal	4th	"Butterfly" by BTS	Ungjae	Orange (291 votes)	Blue (282 votes)	JunQ	"Bermuda Triangle" by Zico featuring Dean, Crush + "Red Sun" by Hangzoo featuring Zico, Swings
Rap-Vocal	5th	"Butterfly" by BTS	Raehwan	Orange (291 votes)	Blue (282 votes)	Marco	"Bermuda Triangle" by Zico featuring Dean, Crush + "Red Sun" by Hangzoo featuring Zico, Swings
Rap-Vocal	6th	"Butterfly" by BTS	Heedo	Orange (291 votes)	Blue (282 votes)	Kanto	"Bermuda Triangle" by Zico featuring Dean, Crush + "Red Sun" by Hangzoo featuring Zico, Swings
Rap-Vocal	7th	"Butterfly" by BTS	Gunwoo	Orange (291 votes)	Blue (282 votes)	Lee Jungha	"Bermuda Triangle" by Zico featuring Dean, Crush + "Red Sun" by Hangzoo featuring Zico, Swings
Rap-Vocal	8th	"Butterfly" by BTS	Kiseok	Orange (291 votes)	Blue (282 votes)	—N/a	"Bermuda Triangle" by Zico featuring Dean, Crush + "Red Sun" by Hangzoo featuring Zico, Swings

=== UNI+ G ===
Color key

- Leader
- Winning Team

Category	Individual Rank	Song	Artists				Song
Category	Individual Rank	Song	Winning Team		Losing Team		Song
Rap-Vocal	1st	"Who's Your Mama?" by Park Jin-young featuring Jessi	Euna Kim	Orange (383 votes)	Blue (154 votes)	Chahee	"Blood Sweat & Tears" by BTS
Rap-Vocal	2nd	"Who's Your Mama?" by Park Jin-young featuring Jessi	Semmi	Orange (383 votes)	Blue (154 votes)	Kwon Haseo	"Blood Sweat & Tears" by BTS
Rap-Vocal	3rd	"Who's Your Mama?" by Park Jin-young featuring Jessi	Somyi	Orange (383 votes)	Blue (154 votes)	Janey	"Blood Sweat & Tears" by BTS
Rap-Vocal	4th	"Who's Your Mama?" by Park Jin-young featuring Jessi	Jiwon	Orange (383 votes)	Blue (154 votes)	Joo	"Blood Sweat & Tears" by BTS
Rap-Vocal	5th	"Who's Your Mama?" by Park Jin-young featuring Jessi	Yang Jiwon	Orange (383 votes)	Blue (154 votes)	Yujeong (Brave Girls)	"Blood Sweat & Tears" by BTS
Rap-Vocal	6th	"Who's Your Mama?" by Park Jin-young featuring Jessi	Kim	Orange (383 votes)	Blue (154 votes)	Han Ahreum	"Blood Sweat & Tears" by BTS
Rap-Vocal	7th	"Who's Your Mama?" by Park Jin-young featuring Jessi	Yoonjo	Orange (383 votes)	Blue (154 votes)	—N/a	"Blood Sweat & Tears" by BTS
Rap-Vocal	8th	"Who's Your Mama?" by Park Jin-young featuring Jessi	Yoomin	Orange (383 votes)	Blue (154 votes)	—N/a	"Blood Sweat & Tears" by BTS
Rap-Vocal	9th	"Who's Your Mama?" by Park Jin-young featuring Jessi	Yeseul	Orange (383 votes)	Blue (154 votes)	—N/a	"Blood Sweat & Tears" by BTS
Vocal	1st	"Jackpot" by Block B	Heejin	Yellow (334 votes)	Green (290 votes)	NC.A	"Last Dance" by Big Bang
Vocal	2nd	"Jackpot" by Block B	Yeoeun	Yellow (334 votes)	Green (290 votes)	Haena	"Last Dance" by Big Bang
Vocal	3rd	"Jackpot" by Block B	Woohee	Yellow (334 votes)	Green (290 votes)	Yebin	"Last Dance" by Big Bang
Vocal	4th	"Jackpot" by Block B	Hyeyeon	Yellow (334 votes)	Green (290 votes)	Yujeong (Laboum)	"Last Dance" by Big Bang
Vocal	5th	"Jackpot" by Block B	Shin Jihoon	Yellow (334 votes)	Green (290 votes)	Lucky	"Last Dance" by Big Bang
Vocal	6th	"Jackpot" by Block B	—N/a	Yellow (334 votes)	Green (290 votes)	Kang Minhee	"Last Dance" by Big Bang
Vocal	7th	"Jackpot" by Block B	—N/a	Yellow (334 votes)	Green (290 votes)	Seol Hayoon	"Last Dance" by Big Bang
Vocal	8th	"Jackpot" by Block B	—N/a	Yellow (334 votes)	Green (290 votes)	Eun.E	"Last Dance" by Big Bang
Vocal	9th	"Jackpot" by Block B	—N/a	Yellow (334 votes)	Green (290 votes)	Gaeul	"Last Dance" by Big Bang
Performance	1st	"Problem" by Ariana Grande	Euijin	Black (337 votes)	Red (298 votes)	Hyosun	"Partition" + "Run The World" by Beyoncé
Performance	2nd	"Problem" by Ariana Grande	ZN	Black (337 votes)	Red (298 votes)	Nari	"Partition" + "Run The World" by Beyoncé
Performance	3rd	"Problem" by Ariana Grande	Lee Hyunjoo	Black (337 votes)	Red (298 votes)	Lee Suji	"Partition" + "Run The World" by Beyoncé
Performance	4th	"Problem" by Ariana Grande	Lee Borim	Black (337 votes)	Red (298 votes)	Anne	"Partition" + "Run The World" by Beyoncé
Performance	5th	"Problem" by Ariana Grande	Haein	Black (337 votes)	Red (298 votes)	Viva	"Partition" + "Run The World" by Beyoncé
Performance	6th	"Problem" by Ariana Grande	Dan-A	Black (337 votes)	Red (298 votes)	Mint	"Partition" + "Run The World" by Beyoncé
Performance	7th	"Problem" by Ariana Grande	Park Jiwon	Black (337 votes)	Red (298 votes)	Lee Joohyun	"Partition" + "Run The World" by Beyoncé
Performance	8th	"Problem" by Ariana Grande	Yena	Black (337 votes)	Red (298 votes)	—N/a	"Partition" + "Run The World" by Beyoncé
Performance	9th	"Problem" by Ariana Grande	Serri	Black (337 votes)	Red (298 votes)	—N/a	"Partition" + "Run The World" by Beyoncé

== Fourth Mission: Digital Singles Release ==
The 64 remaining contestants (32 from each gender) will form 5 groups for each gender, formed by the top 5 contestants from the Self-producing Mission. These formed groups will perform newly produced songs produced by reputable music producers, and these songs will be released as digital singles. Voting of each contestant is conducted during the performances. The winning team for each gender in this mission will have their songs' music videos directed by well-known directors Hong Won-ki and Lee Gi-taek. Plus, every contestant in the winning team will receive a benefit of additional online votes (1st placed contestant gets 10,000 additional votes, 2nd placed contestant gets 7,000 additional votes, and every other contestant in the team gets 5,000 additional votes), which can help in their final positions by the 3rd elimination round.

=== UNI+ B ===
Color key

- Leader
- Winning Team

Order	Team	Song (Producer)	Individual Rank	Artist	Total	Result
1	Red	"**No Way**" (Seo Jae-woo, Breadbeat)	1st	Kanto	330	5th Place
1	Red	"**No Way**" (Seo Jae-woo, Breadbeat)	2nd	Timoteo	330	5th Place
1	Red	"**No Way**" (Seo Jae-woo, Breadbeat)	3rd	**Jeup**	330	5th Place
1	Red	"**No Way**" (Seo Jae-woo, Breadbeat)	4th	Suwoong	330	5th Place
1	Red	"**No Way**" (Seo Jae-woo, Breadbeat)	5th	Taeho	330	5th Place
2	Green	"'You're Mine (내꺼)'" (Kim Seung-soo)	1st	Marco	343	3rd Place
2	Green	"'You're Mine (내꺼)'" (Kim Seung-soo)	2nd	**Rockhyun**	343	3rd Place
2	Green	"'You're Mine (내꺼)'" (Kim Seung-soo)	3rd	JunQ	343	3rd Place
2	Green	"'You're Mine (내꺼)'" (Kim Seung-soo)	4th	Feeldog	343	3rd Place
2	Green	"'You're Mine (내꺼)'" (Kim Seung-soo)	5th	B-Joo	343	3rd Place
2	Green	"'You're Mine (내꺼)'" (Kim Seung-soo)	6th	Lee Jungha	343	3rd Place
3	White	"**My Story**" (Gabriel Branders, Nato Okabe, Daniel Rohtmann)	1st	**Seyong**	333	4th Place
3	White	"**My Story**" (Gabriel Branders, Nato Okabe, Daniel Rohtmann)	2nd	Kijoong	333	4th Place
3	White	"**My Story**" (Gabriel Branders, Nato Okabe, Daniel Rohtmann)	3rd	Raehwan	333	4th Place
3	White	"**My Story**" (Gabriel Branders, Nato Okabe, Daniel Rohtmann)	4th	Heedo	333	4th Place
3	White	"**My Story**" (Gabriel Branders, Nato Okabe, Daniel Rohtmann)	5th	Rayoon	333	4th Place
3	White	"**My Story**" (Gabriel Branders, Nato Okabe, Daniel Rohtmann)	6th	Jun (A.C.E)	333	4th Place
3	White	"**My Story**" (Gabriel Branders, Nato Okabe, Daniel Rohtmann)	7th	Sungjun	333	4th Place
3	White	"**My Story**" (Gabriel Branders, Nato Okabe, Daniel Rohtmann)	8th	Im Junhyeok	333	4th Place
4	Yellow	"**All Day**" (Wonder, Breadbeat, Roydo)	1st	**Jun (U-Kiss)**	362	1st Place
4	Yellow	"**All Day**" (Wonder, Breadbeat, Roydo)	2nd	Hangyul	362	1st Place
4	Yellow	"**All Day**" (Wonder, Breadbeat, Roydo)	3rd	Go Hojung	362	1st Place
4	Yellow	"**All Day**" (Wonder, Breadbeat, Roydo)	4th	Chan	362	1st Place
4	Yellow	"**All Day**" (Wonder, Breadbeat, Roydo)	5th	Ji Hansol	362	1st Place
4	Yellow	"**All Day**" (Wonder, Breadbeat, Roydo)	6th	Dongmyeong	362	1st Place
5	Orange	"**Question**" (Choi Hyun-jun, Park Seul-gi)	1st	**Euijin**	356	2nd Place
5	Orange	"**Question**" (Choi Hyun-jun, Park Seul-gi)	2nd	Lee Geon	356	2nd Place
5	Orange	"**Question**" (Choi Hyun-jun, Park Seul-gi)	3rd	Donghyun	356	2nd Place
5	Orange	"**Question**" (Choi Hyun-jun, Park Seul-gi)	4th	Giseok	356	2nd Place
5	Orange	"**Question**" (Choi Hyun-jun, Park Seul-gi)	5th	Daewon	356	2nd Place
5	Orange	"**Question**" (Choi Hyun-jun, Park Seul-gi)	6th	Ungjae	356	2nd Place
5	Orange	"**Question**" (Choi Hyun-jun, Park Seul-gi)	7th	Jungha	356	2nd Place

- **Bold** denotes the person who picked the team members.

=== UNI+ G ===
Color key

- Leader
- Winning Team

Order	Team	Song (Producer)	Individual Rank	Artist	Total	Result
1	Yellow	"**Cherry On Top**" (Damon Sharpe, Alina Smith, Annalise Morelli, Mats Ymell)	1st	**Euijin**	374	2nd place
1	Yellow	"**Cherry On Top**" (Damon Sharpe, Alina Smith, Annalise Morelli, Mats Ymell)	2nd	Semmi	374	2nd place
1	Yellow	"**Cherry On Top**" (Damon Sharpe, Alina Smith, Annalise Morelli, Mats Ymell)	3rd	Lee Borim	374	2nd place
1	Yellow	"**Cherry On Top**" (Damon Sharpe, Alina Smith, Annalise Morelli, Mats Ymell)	4th	Haein	374	2nd place
1	Yellow	"**Cherry On Top**" (Damon Sharpe, Alina Smith, Annalise Morelli, Mats Ymell)	5th	Yoomin	374	2nd place
1	Yellow	"**Cherry On Top**" (Damon Sharpe, Alina Smith, Annalise Morelli, Mats Ymell)	6th	Yena	374	2nd place
2	Orange	"**Poco a Poco**" (Duble Sidekick, Bull$Eye, Song Ho-il)	1st	Yang Jiwon	320	5th place
2	Orange	"**Poco a Poco**" (Duble Sidekick, Bull$Eye, Song Ho-il)	2nd	Somyi	320	5th place
2	Orange	"**Poco a Poco**" (Duble Sidekick, Bull$Eye, Song Ho-il)	3rd	Yoonjo	320	5th place
2	Orange	"**Poco a Poco**" (Duble Sidekick, Bull$Eye, Song Ho-il)	4th	Lucky	320	5th place
2	Orange	"**Poco a Poco**" (Duble Sidekick, Bull$Eye, Song Ho-il)	5th	**Chahee**	320	5th place
2	Orange	"**Poco a Poco**" (Duble Sidekick, Bull$Eye, Song Ho-il)	6th	Hyeyeon	320	5th place
3	Red	"**Cosmos**" (Jerry.L, Sweetch (MAJORIG))	1st	Yebin	343	4th place
3	Red	"**Cosmos**" (Jerry.L, Sweetch (MAJORIG))	2nd	**Heejin**	343	4th place
3	Red	"**Cosmos**" (Jerry.L, Sweetch (MAJORIG))	3rd	Dan-A	343	4th place
3	Red	"**Cosmos**" (Jerry.L, Sweetch (MAJORIG))	4th	Yeoeun	343	4th place
3	Red	"**Cosmos**" (Jerry.L, Sweetch (MAJORIG))	5th	Hyosun	343	4th place
3	Red	"**Cosmos**" (Jerry.L, Sweetch (MAJORIG))	6th	Kim	343	4th place
3	Red	"**Cosmos**" (Jerry.L, Sweetch (MAJORIG))	7th	Viva	343	4th place
4	Green	"**Sweet" (달콤해)** (Maxx Song, Damon Sharpe, Jimmy Burney, Melanie Fontana, Jamil Chammas)	1st	ZN	355	3rd place
4	Green	"**Sweet" (달콤해)** (Maxx Song, Damon Sharpe, Jimmy Burney, Melanie Fontana, Jamil Chammas)	2nd	Anne	355	3rd place
4	Green	"**Sweet" (달콤해)** (Maxx Song, Damon Sharpe, Jimmy Burney, Melanie Fontana, Jamil Chammas)	3rd	**Euna Kim**	355	3rd place
4	Green	"**Sweet" (달콤해)** (Maxx Song, Damon Sharpe, Jimmy Burney, Melanie Fontana, Jamil Chammas)	4th	Woohee	355	3rd place
4	Green	"**Sweet" (달콤해)** (Maxx Song, Damon Sharpe, Jimmy Burney, Melanie Fontana, Jamil Chammas)	5th	Lee Suji	355	3rd place
4	Green	"**Sweet" (달콤해)** (Maxx Song, Damon Sharpe, Jimmy Burney, Melanie Fontana, Jamil Chammas)	6th	Nari	355	3rd place
5	White	"**Always**" (Sophia Pae, Simon Janlöv)	1st	**NC.A**	377	1st place
5	White	"**Always**" (Sophia Pae, Simon Janlöv)	2nd	Shin Jihoon	377	1st place
5	White	"**Always**" (Sophia Pae, Simon Janlöv)	3rd	Jiwon	377	1st place
5	White	"**Always**" (Sophia Pae, Simon Janlöv)	4th	Yujeong (Laboum)	377	1st place
5	White	"**Always**" (Sophia Pae, Simon Janlöv)	5th	Lee Hyunjoo	377	1st place
5	White	"**Always**" (Sophia Pae, Simon Janlöv)	6th	Lee Joohyun	377	1st place
5	White	"**Always**" (Sophia Pae, Simon Janlöv)	7th	Serri	377	1st place

- **Bold** denotes the person who picked the team members.

== Final Mission: Final Stage Battle ==
The remaining contestants after the 3rd Voting Announcement will form 2 teams of 9 for each gender, through random picking of 1 of the 2 newly produced songs for each gender.

=== Uni+ G (Episode 14) ===
Team	Song (Producer)	Members
White	"Ting" (Wonderkid, Sinkoong, Dalli, Song Ho-jin)	Semmi (Leader), Somyi (Center), Lee Suji, Jiwon, Euna Kim, Yang Jiwon, Lee Hyunjoo, ZN, Dan-A
Red	"You & I" (Duble Sidekick, Bull$Eye, real-fantasy, YOSKE)	Euijin (Leader), Woohee (Center), Yebin, NC.A, Yoonjo, Yeoeun, Shin Jihoon, Chahee, Lee Borim

=== Uni+ B (Episode 14) ===
Team	Song (Producer)	Members
Blue	"Dancing With The Devil" (Command Freaks, Joo Chan-yang, Gabriel Brandes)	Rockhyun (Leader and Center), Jun (U-Kiss), Kim Timoteo, Ji Hansol, Donghyun, Seyong, Jeup, Hangyul, Suwoong
Black	"Raise Me Up" (끌어줘) (Duble Sidekick, EastWest, Bull$Eye, Design88)	Euijin (Leader), Daewon (Center), Go Hojung, Feeldog, Kijoong, Dongmyeong, Chan, Marco, Lee Geon

== Notes ==
- ^{1}Seongho left the group in 2017.
- ^{2}Z-Uk left the group in the beginning of 2017.
- ^{3}Ji Hansol was a former S.M. Entertainment trainee and has been introduced as a member of pre-debut group named SM Rookies.
- ^{4}Kiseok was also a contestant on Boys24.
- ^{5}Dongmyeong was also a contestant on Produce 101 Season 2 but was eliminated on first ranking announcement and finished in 68th place.
- ^{6}Haena debuted with the group Kiss&Cry and was also a contestant on Superstar K 6 but eliminated in the first round.
- ^{7}Heejin was also a contestant on Superstar K 5 and made it to the Top3.
- ^{8}Soya is a niece of singer and tv personality Kim Jong Kook. She has even collaborated with her uncle in the single "I Love You Everyday (매일매일 사랑해)"
- ^{9}Yooji participated in K-pop Star 2 but was eliminated in the Top 8 and was part of the group, YouU. She later participated in the MBC program Kara Project but did not make it into the final round.
- ^{10}Euna Kim participated in Superstar K 3. After her group's disbandment, she later participated in the female rap survival show Unpretty Rapstar 3 but did not make it into the quarter-finals and was eliminated in episode 8
- ^{11}Janey participated in the female rap survival show Unpretty Rapstar 3 but eliminated in episode 6
- ^{12}Hyosun participated in Produce 101 but left the show due to unknown reasons.
- ^{13}Shin Jihoon participated in K-pop Star 2 finishing in the Top 6.
- ^{14}I is the younger sister of Baro from B1A4.
- ^{15}In order of presentation in Episode 4.
- ^{16}In order of performance in Episode 5-6
