= Universe League missions =

Universe League is a South Korean reality competition series featuring boys born before 2011, regardless of nationality, vying for a spot in a new boy group. During the live-broadcast finale on January 24, 2025, the show revealed the final nine members set to debut as AHOF (abbreviation for All-time Hall Of Famer) under the management of F&F Entertainment.

== Missions ==
=== Round 0: Pick (Episode 1-2) ===
==== Draft (Episode 1) ====
The show spans five stages, called P.R.I.S.M. This mission begins with Stage P: Pick, starting with the Draft stage. Forty-two players are divided into seven teams of six, performing for the director cast. After each performance, directors select a First Pick for their roster. If multiple teams choose the same player, he picks his team. Unselected teams then choose a Second Pick.

Color key

Leader

Pick: Draft
Performance			Contestants		Results: Starting Team		
#	Artist	Song (Team)	Contestants		Results: Starting Team		
#	Artist	Song (Team)	Contestants		Rhythm	Groove	Beat
1	The Boyz	Thrill Ride	Anyul	Mac	Park Juwon	Zen Zen	Anyul (Note: Team Beat failed to recruit Park Juwon, Anyul was their 2nd Pick)
1	The Boyz	Thrill Ride	Nam Doyoon	Yeo Gangdong	Park Juwon	Zen Zen	Anyul
1	The Boyz	Thrill Ride	Park Juwon	Zen Zen	Park Juwon	Zen Zen	Anyul
2	Stray Kids	S-Class	Chih En	Bae Jaeho	Sirin	Kim Joohyoung	Chih En
2	Stray Kids	S-Class	Kairi	Kim Joohyoung	Sirin	Kim Joohyoung	Chih En
2	Stray Kids	S-Class	Eito	Sirin	Sirin	Kim Joohyoung	Chih En
3	Exo	Love Shot	Zhang Shuaibo	Hiroto	Zhang Shuaibo	Jang Kyungho	Park Jihun
3	Exo	Love Shot	Li Zhiwei	Jin Ziming	Zhang Shuaibo	Jang Kyungho	Park Jihun
3	Exo	Love Shot	Park Jihun	Jang Kyungho	Zhang Shuaibo	Jang Kyungho	Park Jihun
4	Wanna One	Boomerang	Kenta	Keum Jinho	Royce	Kenta	Keum Jinho
4	Wanna One	Boomerang	Kwon Heejun	Royce	Royce	Kenta	Keum Jinho
4	Wanna One	Boomerang	Kim Daeyun	Kim Gijoong	Royce	Kenta	Keum Jinho
5	Shinee	Replay	Daisuke	Ayumu	Daisuke	Seo Jeongwoo	Cha Woongki
5	Shinee	Replay	Cha Woongki	Kang Junhyuk	Daisuke	Seo Jeongwoo	Cha Woongki
5	Shinee	Replay	Xie Yuxin	Seo Jeongwoo	Daisuke	Seo Jeongwoo	Cha Woongki
6	BoyNextDoor	One and Only (Universe Boy)	Kim Dongyun	Park Yeonjun	JL	James (Note: Both Team Groove and Team Beat failed to recruit JL, James was Team Groove's 2nd Choice, and Kim Dongyun was Team Beat's 2nd Choice)	Kim Dongyun
6	BoyNextDoor	One and Only (Universe Boy)	Yuito	James	JL	James	Kim Dongyun
6	BoyNextDoor	One and Only (Universe Boy)	JL	He Junjin	JL	James	Kim Dongyun
7	Riize	Siren	Li Zhinuo	Koo Hanseo	Steven	Park Han	Jiang Fan (Note: Team Beat failed to recruit Park Han, Jiang Fan was their 2nd Pick)
7	Riize	Siren	Kim Hyotae	Park Han	Steven	Park Han	Jiang Fan
7	Riize	Siren	Jiang Fan	Steven	Steven	Park Han	Jiang Fan

==== Bench Test (Episode 2) ====
After the Draft performances, the Pick stage continues with the Bench Test. The 21 undrafted players showcase their skills individually in 1-on-1 sessions with team directors to earn a spot on a Bench Team. Players not scouted by the end of the test are eliminated.

Pick: Bench Test
RHYTHM		GROOVE		BEAT	
Starting Team	Bench Team	Starting Team	Bench Team	Starting Team	Bench Team
Park Juwon	Li Zhinuo	Jang Kyungho	Yeo Gangdong	Cha Woongki	Yuito
JL	Kwon Heejun	Kenta	Li Zhiwei	Anyul	Kairi
Zhang Shuaibo	Eito	Kim Joohyoung	He Junjin	Jiang Fan	Kim Hyotae
Daisuke	Jin Ziming	James	Kim Daeyun	Park Jihun	Nam Doyoon
Sirin	Ayumu	Park Han	Hiroto	Keum Jinho	Park Yeonjun
Royce	Xie Yuxin	Zen Zen	Kim Gijoong	Kim Dongyun	Kang Junhyuk
Steven	Mac	Seo Jeongwoo	Bae Jaeho	Chih En	Koo Hanseo

=== Round 1: Represent (Episode 2-3) ===
Stage R of P.R.I.S.M., Represent, has two parts. In the "Starting Match," teams perform songs representing their directors, with key roles assigned after two days. Players earn individual scores from votes from a live audience of 300, and the highest scorer is MVP. Team scores are the sum of individual scores. The "Bench Match" follows the same format, with Bench Teams competing and MVPs crowned.

Color Key:

Killing Part/Main Vocal
Leader
Leader and MVP
MVP

Represent: Starting Match						Represent: Bench Match					
Performance			Team			Performance			Team		
#	Song	Original Artist	Name	Score	Players	#	Song	Original Artist	Name	Score	Players
1	"Give Me That"	WayV	Rhythm	1234	Steven	4	"Baggy Jeans"	NCT U	Rhythm	1023	Kwon Heejun
1	"Give Me That"	WayV	Rhythm	1234	JL	4	"Baggy Jeans"	NCT U	Rhythm	1023	Ayumu
1	"Give Me That"	WayV	Rhythm	1234	Zhang Shuaibo	4	"Baggy Jeans"	NCT U	Rhythm	1023	Eito
1	"Give Me That"	WayV	Rhythm	1234	Daisuke	4	"Baggy Jeans"	NCT U	Rhythm	1023	Mac
1	"Give Me That"	WayV	Rhythm	1234	Park Juwon	4	"Baggy Jeans"	NCT U	Rhythm	1023	Li Zhinuo
1	"Give Me That"	WayV	Rhythm	1234	Royce	4	"Baggy Jeans"	NCT U	Rhythm	1023	Xie Yuxin
1	"Give Me That"	WayV	Rhythm	1234	Sirin	4	"Baggy Jeans"	NCT U	Rhythm	1023	Jin Ziming
3	"Missing You"	BtoB	Groove	1172	James	6	"2nd Confession"	BtoB	Groove	1181	Kim Gijoong
3	"Missing You"	BtoB	Groove	1172	Zen Zen	6	"2nd Confession"	BtoB	Groove	1181	Kim Daeyun
3	"Missing You"	BtoB	Groove	1172	Kenta	6	"2nd Confession"	BtoB	Groove	1181	Bae Jaeho
3	"Missing You"	BtoB	Groove	1172	Seo Jeongwoo	6	"2nd Confession"	BtoB	Groove	1181	Hiroto
3	"Missing You"	BtoB	Groove	1172	Park Han	6	"2nd Confession"	BtoB	Groove	1181	He Junjin
3	"Missing You"	BtoB	Groove	1172	Jang Kyungho	6	"2nd Confession"	BtoB	Groove	1181	Li Zhiwei
3	"Missing You"	BtoB	Groove	1172	Kim Joohyoung	6	"2nd Confession"	BtoB	Groove	1181	Yeo Gangdong
2	"Boys Never Die"	TripleS	Beat	966	Keum Jinho	5	"Hard Carry"	Got7	Beat	979	Koo Hanseo
2	"Boys Never Die"	TripleS	Beat	966	Jiang Fan	5	"Hard Carry"	Got7	Beat	979	Kairi
2	"Boys Never Die"	TripleS	Beat	966	Chih En	5	"Hard Carry"	Got7	Beat	979	Yuito
2	"Boys Never Die"	TripleS	Beat	966	Kim Dongyun	5	"Hard Carry"	Got7	Beat	979	Kang Junhyuk
2	"Boys Never Die"	TripleS	Beat	966	Anyul	5	"Hard Carry"	Got7	Beat	979	Kim Hyotae
2	"Boys Never Die"	TripleS	Beat	966	Park Jihun	5	"Hard Carry"	Got7	Beat	979	Park Yeonjun
2	"Boys Never Die"	TripleS	Beat	966	Cha Woongki	5	"Hard Carry"	Got7	Beat	979	Nam Doyoon

=== Round 2: Intercept (Episode 4-5) ===
Stage I of P.R.I.S.M., Intercept, features Starting Teams performing songs by their directors, competing against another Team's Bench Team trying to prevent them from intercepting the song. A week before the performance, most directors check their teams' progress. For each matchup, competing teams earn votes from a live audience of 400, and the winning team officially releases the song on streaming platforms.

Color Key:

Main Vocal
Leader
Leader and Main Vocal
Winning Team

Intercept
Performance			Teams					
#	Song	Production Credit	Name	Score	Players	Name	Score	Players
1,2	"Ignition"	Lyrics & Composition: PAPERMAKER	Rhythm Starting; Team	243	Steven	Beat Bench; Team	154	Park Jihun
1,2	"Ignition"	Lyrics & Composition: PAPERMAKER	Rhythm Starting; Team	243	Park Juwon	Beat Bench; Team	154	Kang Junhyuk
1,2	"Ignition"	Lyrics & Composition: PAPERMAKER	Rhythm Starting; Team	243	Daisuke	Beat Bench; Team	154	Royce
1,2	"Ignition"	Lyrics & Composition: PAPERMAKER	Rhythm Starting; Team	243	Hiroto	Beat Bench; Team	154	Jiang Fan
1,2	"Ignition"	Lyrics & Composition: PAPERMAKER	Rhythm Starting; Team	243	JL	Beat Bench; Team	154	Kim Hyotae
1,2	"Ignition"	Lyrics & Composition: PAPERMAKER	Rhythm Starting; Team	243	Chih En	Beat Bench; Team	154	Kim Dongyun
1,2	"Ignition"	Lyrics & Composition: PAPERMAKER	Rhythm Starting; Team	243	Zhang Shuaibo	Beat Bench; Team	154	Li Zhiwei
5,6	"Prison"	Lyrics & Composition: SonSiaaa, MosPick, Yummy Tone	Groove Starting; Team	295	Seo Jeongwoo	Rhythm Bench; Team	101	Eito
5,6	"Prison"	Lyrics & Composition: SonSiaaa, MosPick, Yummy Tone	Groove Starting; Team	295	Kwon Heejun	Rhythm Bench; Team	101	Ayumu
5,6	"Prison"	Lyrics & Composition: SonSiaaa, MosPick, Yummy Tone	Groove Starting; Team	295	Kim Gijoong	Rhythm Bench; Team	101	Mac
5,6	"Prison"	Lyrics & Composition: SonSiaaa, MosPick, Yummy Tone	Groove Starting; Team	295	Yeo Gangdong	Rhythm Bench; Team	101	Li Zhinuo
5,6	"Prison"	Lyrics & Composition: SonSiaaa, MosPick, Yummy Tone	Groove Starting; Team	295	Bae Jaeho	Rhythm Bench; Team	101	Xie Yuxin
5,6	"Prison"	Lyrics & Composition: SonSiaaa, MosPick, Yummy Tone	Groove Starting; Team	295	Kenta	Rhythm Bench; Team	101	Jin Ziming
5,6	"Prison"	Lyrics & Composition: SonSiaaa, MosPick, Yummy Tone	Groove Starting; Team	295	Park Han	Rhythm Bench; Team	101	Sirin
3,4	"Mamma Mia (Who We Are)"	Lyrics & Composition: ELCXPITAN, Vendors, wavecloud	Beat Starting; Team	174	Nam Doyoon	Groove Bench; Team	221	Jang Kyungho
3,4	"Mamma Mia (Who We Are)"	Lyrics & Composition: ELCXPITAN, Vendors, wavecloud	Beat Starting; Team	174	Kairi	Groove Bench; Team	221	Kim Daeyun
3,4	"Mamma Mia (Who We Are)"	Lyrics & Composition: ELCXPITAN, Vendors, wavecloud	Beat Starting; Team	174	Keum Jinho	Groove Bench; Team	221	Zen Zen
3,4	"Mamma Mia (Who We Are)"	Lyrics & Composition: ELCXPITAN, Vendors, wavecloud	Beat Starting; Team	174	Park Yeonjun	Groove Bench; Team	221	James
3,4	"Mamma Mia (Who We Are)"	Lyrics & Composition: ELCXPITAN, Vendors, wavecloud	Beat Starting; Team	174	Anyul	Groove Bench; Team	221	Kim Joohyoung
3,4	"Mamma Mia (Who We Are)"	Lyrics & Composition: ELCXPITAN, Vendors, wavecloud	Beat Starting; Team	174	Yuito	Groove Bench; Team	221	He Junjin
3,4	"Mamma Mia (Who We Are)"	Lyrics & Composition: ELCXPITAN, Vendors, wavecloud	Beat Starting; Team	174	Cha Woongki	Groove Bench; Team	221	Koo Hanseo

=== Universe Holiday: Talent Show (Episode 6) ===
Universe Holiday offers trainees a break from competition for a fun experience. In the second part, players formed groups of 2–5 for a talent show, performing for their peers. Winners, chosen by contestant votes, received clothing exchange vouchers.

Color Key:

Winning Team

Universe Holiday: Talent Show
Performance			Team	
#	Artist	Song	Name	Players
1	F.T. Island	Love Sick	사죽사남 (LDLM)	Keum Jinho, Kim Gijoong, Kim Joohyoung, Kwon Heejun
2	Seo Inguk; Jung Eun-ji	All For You	Feel Special	Cha Woongki, Zhang Shuaibo
3	Paul Kim (Fin.K.L)	White	우즈스타 (Universe Star)	Chih En, Kenta, Seo Jeongwoo, Steven
4	NCT Dream	Candy	맛탕 (Candy)	Daisuke, He Junjin, Park Juwon, Yeo Gangdong
5	10cm	Phonecert	N/A	Bae Jaeho, Kim Daeyun, Nam Doyoon
6	SuperM	Tiger Inside	N/A	Ayumu, Jang Kyungho, Kairi, Koo Hanseo, Yuito
7	BSS	Fighting	태일중 (Thailand, Japan, China)	Hiroto, James, Li Zhiwei, Sirin
8	Psy	That That	N/A	Eito, Jin Ziming, Kim Hyotae, Li Zhinuo, Xie Yuxin
9	Ryeowook	The Little Prince	레전드 보컬 듀오 (Legend Vocal Duo)	JL, Park Han
10	Youngtak	Jjiniya	찐이야 / 막내즈 (Jjiniya/Maknaes)	Anyul, Kim Dongyun, Mac, Zen Zen

=== Round 3: Seven (Episode 7-8) ===
Stage S of P.R.I.S.M., Seven, has two parts. Directors draft two seven-player units per team for original songs produced by them, assigning players flexibly. Players can practice any song, and directors finalize units two weeks before performing. In the First Unit Match, teams compete with the first song, earning votes from a live audience of 400, for up to 2,800 points in total. The Second Unit Match follows the same format with the second song.

Color Key:

Leader
Winning Team

Seven: First Unit Match						Seven: Second Unit Match					
Performance			Teams			Performance			Teams		
#	Song	Production Credit	Names	Score	Players	#	Song	Production Credit	Names	Score	Players
3	"Roller Coaster"	Lyrics & Composition: PAPERMAKER	Rhythm	1,551	Steven	6	"Don't Hit The; Brakes"	Lyrics & Composition: PAPERMAKER	Rhythm	1,485	Chih En
3	"Roller Coaster"	Lyrics & Composition: PAPERMAKER	Rhythm	1,551	Zhang Shuaibo	6	"Don't Hit The; Brakes"	Lyrics & Composition: PAPERMAKER	Rhythm	1,485	Li Zhinuo
3	"Roller Coaster"	Lyrics & Composition: PAPERMAKER	Rhythm	1,551	Chih En	6	"Don't Hit The; Brakes"	Lyrics & Composition: PAPERMAKER	Rhythm	1,485	Zen Zen
3	"Roller Coaster"	Lyrics & Composition: PAPERMAKER	Rhythm	1,551	Xie Yuxin	6	"Don't Hit The; Brakes"	Lyrics & Composition: PAPERMAKER	Rhythm	1,485	Zhang Shuaibo
3	"Roller Coaster"	Lyrics & Composition: PAPERMAKER	Rhythm	1,551	Ayumu	6	"Don't Hit The; Brakes"	Lyrics & Composition: PAPERMAKER	Rhythm	1,485	Daisuke
3	"Roller Coaster"	Lyrics & Composition: PAPERMAKER	Rhythm	1,551	JL	6	"Don't Hit The; Brakes"	Lyrics & Composition: PAPERMAKER	Rhythm	1,485	JL
3	"Roller Coaster"	Lyrics & Composition: PAPERMAKER	Rhythm	1,551	Daisuke	6	"Don't Hit The; Brakes"	Lyrics & Composition: PAPERMAKER	Rhythm	1,485	Steven
1	"나는 너야" (Only U)	Lyrics & Composition: SonSiaaa, MosPick	Groove	1,711	Kenta	4	"Butterfly"	Lyrics & Composition: SonSiaaa, MosPick	Groove	1,651	Kim Gijoong
1	"나는 너야" (Only U)	Lyrics & Composition: SonSiaaa, MosPick	Groove	1,711	Park Juwon	4	"Butterfly"	Lyrics & Composition: SonSiaaa, MosPick	Groove	1,651	Jang Kyungho
1	"나는 너야" (Only U)	Lyrics & Composition: SonSiaaa, MosPick	Groove	1,711	Yeo Gangdong	4	"Butterfly"	Lyrics & Composition: SonSiaaa, MosPick	Groove	1,651	Kenta
1	"나는 너야" (Only U)	Lyrics & Composition: SonSiaaa, MosPick	Groove	1,711	He Junjin	4	"Butterfly"	Lyrics & Composition: SonSiaaa, MosPick	Groove	1,651	Sirin
1	"나는 너야" (Only U)	Lyrics & Composition: SonSiaaa, MosPick	Groove	1,711	Koo Hanseo	4	"Butterfly"	Lyrics & Composition: SonSiaaa, MosPick	Groove	1,651	Park Han
1	"나는 너야" (Only U)	Lyrics & Composition: SonSiaaa, MosPick	Groove	1,711	Park Han	4	"Butterfly"	Lyrics & Composition: SonSiaaa, MosPick	Groove	1,651	Seo Jeongwoo
1	"나는 너야" (Only U)	Lyrics & Composition: SonSiaaa, MosPick	Groove	1,711	Kwon Heejun	4	"Butterfly"	Lyrics & Composition: SonSiaaa, MosPick	Groove	1,651	Bae Jaeho
2	"My, My, My"	Lyrics & Composition: ELCXPITAN, Vendors, wavecloud	Beat	1,539	Nam Doyoon	5	"ON&ON"	Lyrics & Composition: ELCXPITAN, Vendors, wavecloud	Beat	1,665	Cha Woongki
2	"My, My, My"	Lyrics & Composition: ELCXPITAN, Vendors, wavecloud	Beat	1,539	Yuito	5	"ON&ON"	Lyrics & Composition: ELCXPITAN, Vendors, wavecloud	Beat	1,665	Nam Doyoon
2	"My, My, My"	Lyrics & Composition: ELCXPITAN, Vendors, wavecloud	Beat	1,539	Anyul	5	"ON&ON"	Lyrics & Composition: ELCXPITAN, Vendors, wavecloud	Beat	1,665	Keum Jinho
2	"My, My, My"	Lyrics & Composition: ELCXPITAN, Vendors, wavecloud	Beat	1,539	Keum Jinho	5	"ON&ON"	Lyrics & Composition: ELCXPITAN, Vendors, wavecloud	Beat	1,665	Kairi
2	"My, My, My"	Lyrics & Composition: ELCXPITAN, Vendors, wavecloud	Beat	1,539	Kim Hyotae	5	"ON&ON"	Lyrics & Composition: ELCXPITAN, Vendors, wavecloud	Beat	1,665	Kim Hyotae
2	"My, My, My"	Lyrics & Composition: ELCXPITAN, Vendors, wavecloud	Beat	1,539	Cha Woongki	5	"ON&ON"	Lyrics & Composition: ELCXPITAN, Vendors, wavecloud	Beat	1,665	Yuito
2	"My, My, My"	Lyrics & Composition: ELCXPITAN, Vendors, wavecloud	Beat	1,539	Kairi	5	"ON&ON"	Lyrics & Composition: ELCXPITAN, Vendors, wavecloud	Beat	1,665	Anyul

=== Round 4: Move (Episode 9) ===
Stage M of P.R.I.S.M., Move, determines the 21 finalists through fan votes and producer selections. Fan vote slots are based on combined scores from rounds 1–3: first place gets five, second place three, and third place one. Directors select the remaining finalists, regardless of team or past statistical performance. Players move from the waiting room to the stage upon selection.

Move: Finalists
#	Rhythm	Groove	Beat
1	JL	Park Han	Cha Woongki
2	Steven	Kim Joohyoung	Kairi
3	Zhang Shuaibo	Kenta	Keum Jinho
4	Chih En	Jang Kyungho	Yuito
5	Park Juwon	Koo Hanseo	Sirin
6	Daisuke	Kwon Heejun	Zen Zen
7	Seo Jeongwoo	Kim Gijoong	Kim Dongyun

=== Final Round: W.A.R (We Are Ready, Episode 10) ===
This round serves as the grand finale of the competition, where the stakes are at their highest. The producers have raised the bar by assigning two songs to every player of each team, challenging them to deliver their best performances during the live show. These performances will not only showcase the teams' talent, but also the members synergy by incorporating details that require coordination. The teams final performances are their last efforts to impress the audience and attempt to attract votes.

W.A.R. (We Are Ready)
Teams		Performances					
Names	Players	#	Song	Production Credit	#	Song	Production Credit
Rhythm	JL	1	"@TAG"	Lyrics & Composition: PAPERMAKER	6	"La Fiesta"	Lyrics & Composition: PAPERMAKER
Rhythm	Park Juwon	1	"@TAG"	Lyrics & Composition: PAPERMAKER	6	"La Fiesta"	Lyrics & Composition: PAPERMAKER
Rhythm	Zhang Shuaibo	1	"@TAG"	Lyrics & Composition: PAPERMAKER	6	"La Fiesta"	Lyrics & Composition: PAPERMAKER
Rhythm	Chih En	1	"@TAG"	Lyrics & Composition: PAPERMAKER	6	"La Fiesta"	Lyrics & Composition: PAPERMAKER
Rhythm	Seo Jeongwoo	1	"@TAG"	Lyrics & Composition: PAPERMAKER	6	"La Fiesta"	Lyrics & Composition: PAPERMAKER
Rhythm	Steven	1	"@TAG"	Lyrics & Composition: PAPERMAKER	6	"La Fiesta"	Lyrics & Composition: PAPERMAKER
Rhythm	Daisuke	1	"@TAG"	Lyrics & Composition: PAPERMAKER	6	"La Fiesta"	Lyrics & Composition: PAPERMAKER
Groove	Park Han	2	"Universe (그 막이 열리면 닿을 메시지)" (A Message That Will Reach; Once The Curtain Rises)	Lyrics & Composition: SonSiaaa, MosPick	5	"같은 그대 같은 곳에" (Anywhere, I'll Be With You)	Lyrics & Composition: SonSiaaa, MosPick
Groove	Kim Joohyoung	2	"Universe (그 막이 열리면 닿을 메시지)" (A Message That Will Reach; Once The Curtain Rises)	Lyrics & Composition: SonSiaaa, MosPick	5	"같은 그대 같은 곳에" (Anywhere, I'll Be With You)	Lyrics & Composition: SonSiaaa, MosPick
Groove	Jang Kyungho	2	"Universe (그 막이 열리면 닿을 메시지)" (A Message That Will Reach; Once The Curtain Rises)	Lyrics & Composition: SonSiaaa, MosPick	5	"같은 그대 같은 곳에" (Anywhere, I'll Be With You)	Lyrics & Composition: SonSiaaa, MosPick
Groove	Kwon Heejun	2	"Universe (그 막이 열리면 닿을 메시지)" (A Message That Will Reach; Once The Curtain Rises)	Lyrics & Composition: SonSiaaa, MosPick	5	"같은 그대 같은 곳에" (Anywhere, I'll Be With You)	Lyrics & Composition: SonSiaaa, MosPick
Groove	Koo Hanseo	2	"Universe (그 막이 열리면 닿을 메시지)" (A Message That Will Reach; Once The Curtain Rises)	Lyrics & Composition: SonSiaaa, MosPick	5	"같은 그대 같은 곳에" (Anywhere, I'll Be With You)	Lyrics & Composition: SonSiaaa, MosPick
Groove	Kenta	2	"Universe (그 막이 열리면 닿을 메시지)" (A Message That Will Reach; Once The Curtain Rises)	Lyrics & Composition: SonSiaaa, MosPick	5	"같은 그대 같은 곳에" (Anywhere, I'll Be With You)	Lyrics & Composition: SonSiaaa, MosPick
Groove	Kim Gijoong	2	"Universe (그 막이 열리면 닿을 메시지)" (A Message That Will Reach; Once The Curtain Rises)	Lyrics & Composition: SonSiaaa, MosPick	5	"같은 그대 같은 곳에" (Anywhere, I'll Be With You)	Lyrics & Composition: SonSiaaa, MosPick
Beat	Cha Woongki	3	"Sunset in the sky"	Lyrics & Composition: ELCXPITAN, Vendors, wavecloud	4	"Dreaming"	Lyrics & Composition: ELCXPITAN, Vendors, Cha Woongki, Keum Jinho Kairi, Yuito, Sirin Kim Dongyun, Zen Zen
Beat	Kairi	3	"Sunset in the sky"	Lyrics & Composition: ELCXPITAN, Vendors, wavecloud	4	"Dreaming"	Lyrics & Composition: ELCXPITAN, Vendors, Cha Woongki, Keum Jinho Kairi, Yuito, Sirin Kim Dongyun, Zen Zen
Beat	Kim Dongyun	3	"Sunset in the sky"	Lyrics & Composition: ELCXPITAN, Vendors, wavecloud	4	"Dreaming"	Lyrics & Composition: ELCXPITAN, Vendors, Cha Woongki, Keum Jinho Kairi, Yuito, Sirin Kim Dongyun, Zen Zen
Beat	Yuito	3	"Sunset in the sky"	Lyrics & Composition: ELCXPITAN, Vendors, wavecloud	4	"Dreaming"	Lyrics & Composition: ELCXPITAN, Vendors, Cha Woongki, Keum Jinho Kairi, Yuito, Sirin Kim Dongyun, Zen Zen
Beat	Sirin	3	"Sunset in the sky"	Lyrics & Composition: ELCXPITAN, Vendors, wavecloud	4	"Dreaming"	Lyrics & Composition: ELCXPITAN, Vendors, Cha Woongki, Keum Jinho Kairi, Yuito, Sirin Kim Dongyun, Zen Zen
Beat	Keum Jinho	3	"Sunset in the sky"	Lyrics & Composition: ELCXPITAN, Vendors, wavecloud	4	"Dreaming"	Lyrics & Composition: ELCXPITAN, Vendors, Cha Woongki, Keum Jinho Kairi, Yuito, Sirin Kim Dongyun, Zen Zen
Beat	Zen Zen	3	"Sunset in the sky"	Lyrics & Composition: ELCXPITAN, Vendors, wavecloud	4	"Dreaming"	Lyrics & Composition: ELCXPITAN, Vendors, Cha Woongki, Keum Jinho Kairi, Yuito, Sirin Kim Dongyun, Zen Zen

== Mission Results ==
=== Represent Results (Episode 3) ===
The winning team avoids Yellow Cards and earns Trade Tickets to swap players with lower-ranked teams. Final scores combine Starting and Bench Team results. The top team is exempt from Yellow Cards, while the bottom 3 in 2nd place and bottom 6 in 3rd place receive one each. Two Yellow Cards in the future result in immediate elimination.

Color Key:

Winning Team

Represent: Results
Team	Starting Team Score	Bench Team Score	Total Score	Items	
Team	Starting Team Score	Bench Team Score	Total Score	Yellow Cards	Trade Tickets
Rhythm	1234	1023	2257	3	1
Groove	1172	1181	2353	0	2
Beat	966	979	1945	6	0

==== Trade (Episode 3) ====
Since Team Groove won first place, they earned two Trade Tickets, while Team Rhythm in second, earned one Trade Ticket, with Team Beat not receiving any as a result of placing last. Trade Tickets can be used to trade players with teams lower-ranked than the user of the Tickets.

Trade
Team	Contestant Released	Contestant Scouted
Rhythm	Royce	Chih En
Groove	Li Zhiwei	Koo Hanseo
Groove	Hiroto	Kwon Heejun
Beat	N/A	N/A

Based on the players' ranking from the live audience voting (players ranked first to seventh formed the Starting Team, while players ranked eight to fourteenth formed the Bench Team) and the trades, each Team's Starting Team and Bench Team are the following:

Key:

-	Yellow Card (1)

Represent: Results
Rhythm		Groove		Beat	
Starting Team	Bench Team	Starting Team	Bench Team	Starting Team	Bench Team
Park Juwon	Ayumu	Seo Jeongwoo	He Junjin	Cha Woongki	Kim Hyotae
Hiroto	Xie Yuxin	Kwon Heejun	Jang Kyungho	An Yul	Royce
Zhang Shuaibo	Jin Ziming	Kim Gijoong	Koo Hanseo	Kairi	Li Zhiwei
JL	Sirin	Kenta	Kim Daeyun	Yuito	Jiang Fan
Chih En	Eito	Yeo Gangdong	Kim Joohyoung	Nam Doyoon	Kim Dongyun
Steven	Li Zhinuo	Park Han	James	Keum Jinho	Kang Junhyuk
Daisuke	Mac	Bae Jaeho	Zen Zen	Park Yeonjun	Park Jihun

=== Intercept Results (Episode 5) ===
Similar to the last round, the winning team avoids Yellow Cards and gains more Trade Tickets. Final scores combine live and online votes from the first voting period. The top team is exempt from Yellow Cards, while the bottom 3 in 2nd place and bottom 6 in 3rd place receive one Yellow Card each. A second Yellow Card results in immediate elimination.

Color Key:

Winning Team

Intercept: Results
Team	On-site Score	Online Score	Total Score	Items	
Team	On-site Score	Online Score	Total Score	Yellow Cards	Trade Tickets
Rhythm	344	516	860	3	1
Groove	516	369	885	0	2
Beat	328	315	643	6	0

==== Trade (Episode 5) ====
Since Team Groove won first place, they earned two Trade Tickets, while Team Rhythm in second, earned one Trade Ticket, with Team Beat not receiving any as a result of placing last.

Trade
Team	Contestant Released	Contestant Scouted
Rhythm	Jin Ziming	Kim Dongyun
Groove	Zen Zen	Sirin
Groove	James	Park Juwon
Beat	N/A	N/A

Based on the players' ranking from the online votes (players ranked first to seventh formed the Starting Team, while players ranked eight to fourteenth formed the Bench Team) and the trades, each Team's Starting Team and Bench Team are the following:

Key:

-	Yellow Card (1)

Intercept: Results
Rhythm		Groove		Beat	
Starting Team	Bench Team	Starting Team	Bench Team	Starting Team	Bench Team
JL	Li Zhinuo	Kenta	He Junjin	Cha Woongki	Li Zhiwei
Zhang Shuaibo	James	Jang Kyungho	Koo Hanseo	Keum Jinho	Jin Ziming
Steven	Ayumu	Seo Jeongwoo	Kim Gijoong	Kairi	-
Chih En	Mac	Park Juwon	Sirin	Yuito	-
Eito	Hiroto	Kwon Heejun	Bae Jaeho	Kim Hyotae	-
Daisuke	Zen Zen	Kim Joohyoung	Kim Daeyun	Nam Doyoon	-
Kim Dongyun	Xie Yuxin	Park Han	Yeo Gangdong	Anyul	-

=== Seven Results (Episode 8) ===
Similar to the last round, the winning team avoids Yellow Cards and gains Trade Tickets. Final scores combine 30% live votes and 70% online votes from the second voting period. Players performing twice in Round 3 have their online score counted twice. Those who don't perform during Round 3 get a 0 for live votes. The top team is exempt from Yellow Cards, while the bottom 3 in 2nd place and bottom 6 in 3rd place receive one Yellow Card each. A second Yellow Card results in immediate elimination.

Color Key:

Winning Team

Seven: Results
Team	On-site Score	Online Score	Total Score	Items	
Team	On-site Score	Online Score	Total Score	Yellow Cards	Trade Tickets
Rhythm	9,108	59,898	69,006	0	2
Groove	10,086	34,906	44,992	3	1
Beat	9,612	22,796	32,408	6	0

==== Trade (Episode 8) ====
Since Team Rhythm won first place, they earned two Trade Tickets, while Team Groove in second, earned one Trade Ticket, with Team Beat not receiving any as a result of placing last.

Trade
Team	Contestant Released	Contestant Scouted
Rhythm	Kim Dongyun	Seo Jeongwoo
Rhythm	Hiroto	Park Juwon
Groove	Kim Daeyun	Anyul
Beat	N/A	N/A

Based on the players' ranking from the live audience voting and the online votes (players ranked first to seventh formed the Starting Team, while players ranked eight to fourteenth formed the Bench Team) and the trades, each Team's Starting Team and Bench Team are the following:

Key:

-	Yellow Card (1)

Seven: Results
Rhythm		Groove		Beat
Starting Team	Bench Team	Starting Team	Bench Team	Starting Team
JL	Eito	Park Han	Kim Dongyun	Cha Woongki
Steven	Mac	Kenta	Kim Gijoong	Kairi
Zhang Shuaibo	James	Kim Joohyoung	He Junjin	Keum Jinho
Chih En	Zen Zen	Jang Kyungho	Anyul	Kim Daeyun
Park Juwon	Li Zhinuo	Kwon Heejun	Hiroto	Yuito
Seo Jeongwoo	Ayumu	Sirin	Bae Jaeho	Nam Doyoon
Daisuke	Xie Yuxin	Koo Hanseo	Yeo Gangdong	-

=== Move Results (Episode 9) ===
Final team rankings for the league match are based on scores from stages R, I, and S of P.R.I.S.M., determining the final 21 players. Fan votes and directors' choices decide the final team, with higher-ranked teams securing more fan-chosen members. Directors fill the remaining spots, selecting players regardless of team or rank.

Color Key:

Winning Team

Move: Results
Team	Round 1: Represent	Round 2: Intercept	Round 3: Seven	Total Score	Finalists	
Team	Round 1: Represent	Round 2: Intercept	Round 3: Seven	Total Score	Fan Votes	Producer's Pick
Rhythm	34,432	36,013	47,133	117,579	5	2
Groove	35,896	37,060	30,731	103,688	3	4
Beat	29,672	26,926	22,136	78,734	1	6

Here are the overall results for this round, along with the chosen lineups for each team:

Color Key:

Fans Vote Pick
Directors Pick
Eliminated Contestants

Move: Results
Rank	Team	Name	Votes Received	Rank	Team	Name	Votes Received
1	Rhythm	JL	1,099,728	22	Beat	Keum Jinho	93,393
2	Rhythm	Steven	598,718	23	Rhythm	Ayumu	90,002
3	Rhythm	Zhang Shuaibo	525,193	24	Rhythm	Mac	89,124
4	Rhythm	Chih En	504,012	25	Groove	Kim Gijoong	81,816
5	Groove	Park Han	467,242	26	Beat	Kim Daeyun	69,462
6	Rhythm	Park Juwon	414,534	27	Groove	Bae Jaeho	67,337
7	Beat	Cha Woongki	400,554	28	Groove	Anyul	67,181
8	Rhythm	Daisuke	298,630	29	Rhythm	James	65,474
9	Rhythm	Li Zhinuo	224,403 (Note: Li Zhinuo was eliminated during the pre-finale ranking despite ranking ninth as the public voting result only gave five slots at maximum and Team Rhythm, despite being given the maximum slots, had maxed out their slots due to the number of contestants in the team at a higher rank. The remaining slots were selected by the directors, who were unaware of the rankings during the time of selection.)	30	Beat	Yuito	64,832
10	Groove	Kim Joohyoung	188,339	31	Beat	Nam Doyoon	62,787
11	Rhythm	Zen Zen	177,112 (Note: Sirin, Kim Dongyun, and Zen Zen were not selected by their original team, Team Groove and Rhythm respectively, and were instead selected by Team Beat.)	32	Groove	He Junjin	62,255
12	Groove	Kenta	171,378	33	Groove	Yeo Gangdong	57,218
13	Groove	Koo Hanseo	166,779	34	Groove	Hiroto	53,537
14	Rhythm	Seo Jeongwoo	166,769				
15	Groove	Kwon Heejun	156,380				
16	Groove	Jang Kyungho	156,105				
17	Beat	Kairi	145,115				
18	Groove	Sirin	123,690				
19	Groove	Kim Dongyun	122,258				
20	Rhythm	Eito	108,779				
21	Rhythm	Xie Yuxin	96,795				

=== W.A.R. Results (Episode 10) ===
The online votes for each team from the final voting period determined the team who would win the Prism Cup and secure their debut. To finalize the group, one player from each of the unselected teams with the highest votes would also join the debut lineup.

Color Key:

Winning Team
Debuting Contestant
Debuting Contestant (MVP)

W.A.R.: Results
Rhythm		Groove		Beat	
JL		Park Han		Cha Woongki	
Steven		Jang Kyungho		Kairi	
Zhang Shuaibo		Kim Joohyoung		Sirin	
Park Juwon		Kwon Heejun		Yuito	
Seo Jeongwoo		Kenta		Keum Jinho	
Chih En		Koo Hanseo		Kim Dongyun	
Daisuke		Kim Gijoong		Zen Zen	
Combined Votes:	4,378,961	Combined Votes:	1,239,192	Combined Votes:	965,871
