= Uni.T =

South Korean girl group

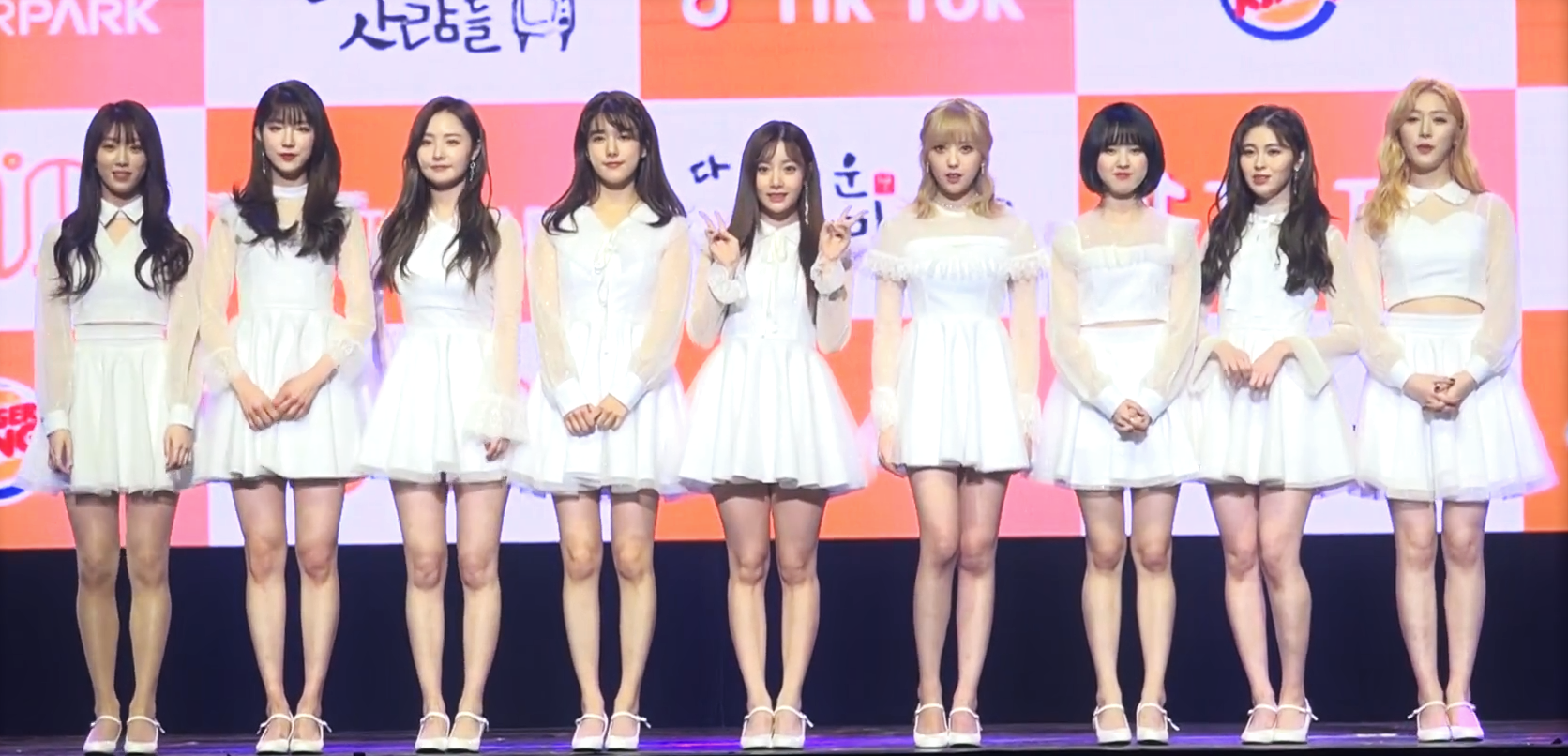
- UNI.T in March 2018; From left to right: Suji, ZN, Woohee, Jiwon, Hyunjoo, Yoonjo, NC.A, Yebin, Euijin

Background information
- Origin: Seoul, South Korea
- Genres: K-pop; Dancehall; Synthpop
- Years active: 2018
- Label: PocketDol Studio
- Spinoff of: Dal Shabet; DIA; Laboum; Sonamoo
- Past members: Yang Ji-won; Woohee; Yoonjo; ZN; NC.A; Euijin; Yebin; Lee Hyun-joo; Lee Su-ji

Uni.T (Korean: 유니티; stylized as UNI.T) was a South Korean girl group formed through the KBS survival show The Unit. The group consisted of nine members: Yang Ji-won, Bae Woo-hee, Yoonjo, ZN, NC.A, Euijin, Yebin, Lee Hyun-joo and Lee Su-ji. For their second and last release, they were promoting as 8 without ZN. Their debut extended play, Line, was released on May 18, 2018. Uni.T ended their activities and disbanded on October 18, 2018.

== History ==
=== Pre-debut: The Unit ===
==== Members' history ====
Prior to The Unit, all the members were actively involved in the entertainment industry:

- Yang Ji-won was originally part of the pre-debut lineups of Five Girls and T-ara, but later left and debuted as a member of Spica in February 2012, the group subsequently went on a hiatus in June 2017.
- Yoonjo debuted as a member of Hello Venus in May 2012, but left in July 2014 due to changes in management.
- Woohee was added to Dal Shabet as a member in June 2012.
- NC.A debuted as a solo artist in August 2013.
- ZN debuted as a member of Laboum in August 2014.
- Euijin debuted as a member of Sonamoo in December 2014.
- Lee Su-ji debuted as a member of The Ark in April 2015, the group later on disbanded in 2016 and she went on to debut as a member of Real Girls Project in August 2016.
- Lee Hyun-joo debuted as a member of April in August 2015, but left in October 2016 to pursue an acting career.
- Yebin debuted as a member of DIA in September 2015.

==== Formation through The Unit ====
In July 2017, KBS announced their new survival show that would create male and female unit groups, with nine members each, among idols who had already debuted. The program aimed to give them a fair chance to demonstrate their talents that they might not have been able to showcase before. The final nine female contestants were chosen by public voting and announced via live television broadcast. It premiered on October 28, 2017, and concluded on February 10, 2018.

On February 21, 2018, it was revealed that the female group, Uni+ G, would hold their first fan-meeting on March 3 at Blue Square iMarket Hall. The tickets sold out within two hours of being on sale. On February 24's broadcast of The Unit's Special Show, the final nine female contestants that formed “Uni+ G” became UNI.T following the announcement.

On April 28, 2018, it was revealed that UNI.T would make their debut on May 17, 2018. However, on May 11, their debut was pushed back to May 18, a day after their initial debut date.

=== Debut with Line ===
UNI.T debuted with their first extended play, Line, on May 18, 2018, with the lead single "No More", composed by Shinsadong Tiger. The lead single is characterized by its reggae elements. The group performed "No More" for the first time at the 2018 Dream Concert on May 12, six days before their debut. They made their debut stage on KBS' Music Bank on the same day as the album's release, where they performed "A Memory Clock" and "No More".

=== ZN's hiatus, Last activities and disbandment ===
Uni.T released its second and last album titled Begin with the End on September 18, 2018, with the lead single "I Mean" being composed by Brave Brothers. On September 12, 2018, it was announced that ZN would not be a part of the farewell album due to Laboum's overlapped schedule.

On October 18, 2018, the group performed "I Mean" and "Begin with the End" for the last time on Music Bank and later the same day held their last fan meeting, after which they disbanded.

== Members ==
Adapted from The Unit official website:

- Yang Ji-won (양지원; former Spica)
- Woohee (우희; Dal Shabet) – Leader
- Yoonjo (윤조; former Hello Venus)
- ZN (지엔; Laboum)
- NC.A (엔씨아)
- Euijin (의진; Sonamoo)
- Yebin (예빈; DIA)
- Lee Hyun-joo (이현주; former April)
- Lee Su-ji (이수지; former The Ark)

== Discography ==
=== Extended plays ===
Title	Details	Peak chart positions	Sales
Title	Details	KOR	Sales
Line	Released: May 18, 2018; Label: All the Happy People, Kakao M; Formats: CD, digital download; Track listing: 1. "No More" (넘어); 2. "A Memory Clock" (추억시계); 3. "Star" (별아); 4. "You & I" (내가 하고 싶은 말은); 5. "Ting"; 6. "No More" (넘어) (Inst.); 7. "A Memory Clock" (Inst.)	3	KOR: 15,861
Begin with the End	Released: September 18, 2018; Label: All the Happy People, Kakao M; Formats: CD, digital download; Track listing: 1. "I Mean" (난말야); 2. "Begin with the End" (끝을 아는 시작); 3. "Candy"; 4. "Shine" (Bonus Track); 5. "I Mean" (난말야) (Inst.)	11	KOR: 9,880

=== Singles ===
Title	Year	Peak chart positions	Album
Title	Year	KOR	Album
"No More" (넘어)	2018	— (Note: "No More" did not enter the Gaon Digital Chart, but peaked at number 26 on Mobile component chart.)	Line
"I Mean" (난말야)	2018	—	Begin with the End
"—" denotes releases that did not chart or were not released in that region.

== Filmography ==
=== Reality shows ===
- The Unit (KBS2, 2017–2018)
- UNI.TV (2018)

== Awards and nominations ==
=== Golden Disc Awards ===
Year	Category	Recipient	Result
2019	Rookie Artist Award	Uni.T	Nominated
2019	Popularity Award	Uni.T	Nominated
