= Tiny-G =

South Korean girl group

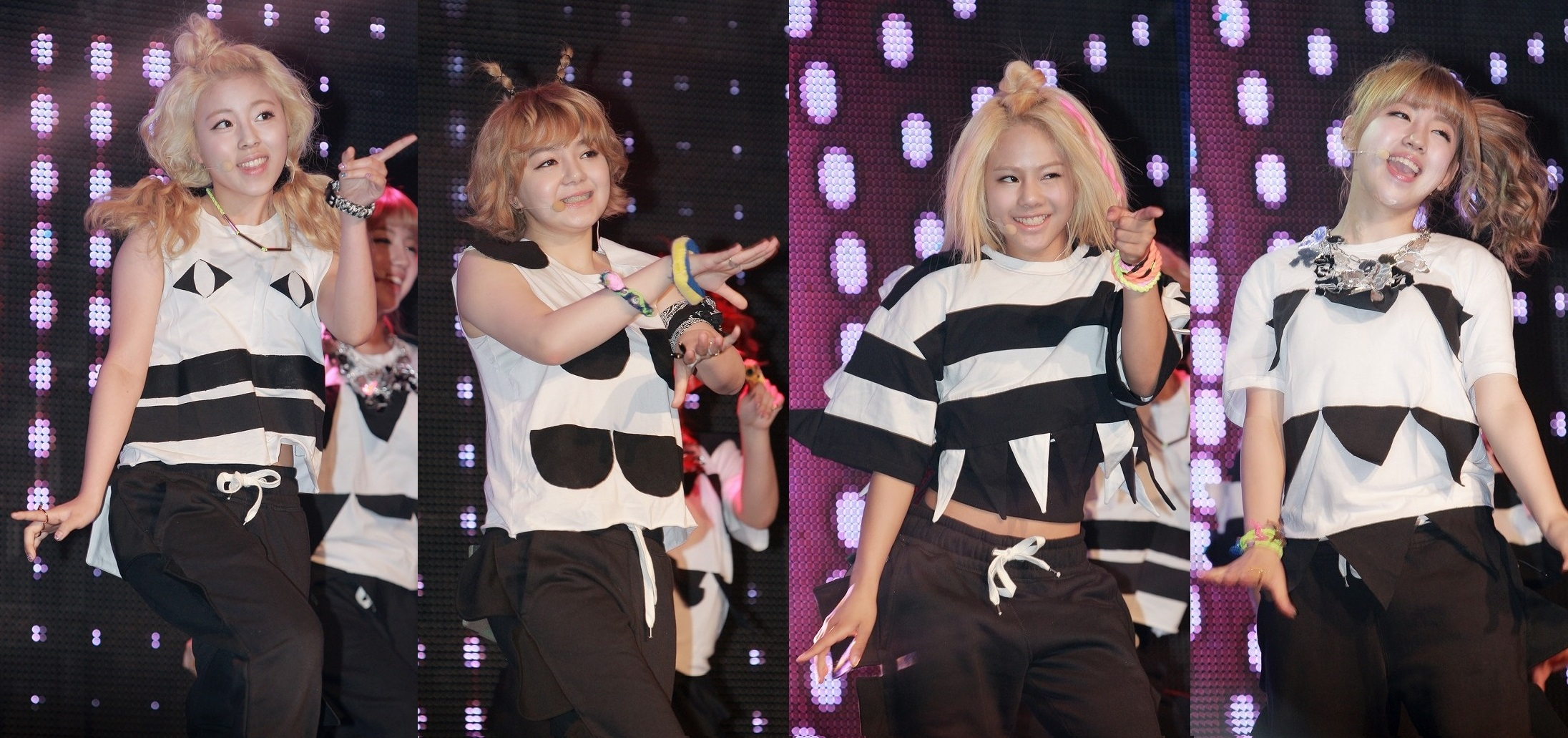
- Tiny-G in May 2013; From left to right: Dohee, Myungji, Mint, J. Min

Background information
- Origin: South Korea
- Genres: K-pop
- Years active: 2012–2015
- Labels: GNG Production, LOEN Entertainment
- Past members: Myungji; Mint; J. Min; Dohee
- Website: Official website

Tiny-G (Korean: 타이니지) was a Korean K-pop group based in South Korea, formed in 2012 by GNG Production and disbanded in 2015. The group originally consisted of J. Min, Dohee, Mint, and Myungji, but their final line-up was the duo of J. Min and Dohee.

== History ==
The group appeared on MBC's show Show Champion on April 24, 2012, and performed the track "Polaris" with singer Jay Park and actress Lee Si-young. The instrumentation was composed and produced by Cha Cha Malone and Jay Park. The song was released on May 5.

Their debut single "Tiny-G", with which they made their debut on M! Countdown, was released on August 23, 2012. The group released their second single, "Minimanimo", on January 20, 2013. On June 13, 2013, the group performed an OST for the game Dragon Nest titled "Here We Go", and on October 1, 2013, they released their third single, "Miss You".

On March 12, 2014, Dohee and J. Min performed an OST for the drama Cunning Single Lady titled "Mirror Mirror". On June 26, GNG Production announced that Myungji had left the band to focus on her acting career. Tiny-G came back as a trio on July 3 with the song "Ice Baby". In November 2014, the sub-unit Tiny-G M, composed of J. Min and Mint, released their first single, "The Only One", featuring Thai artist Natthew. The music video was released on November 25 and featured appearances by Natthew and Tiny-G member Dohee.

On February 2015, 2015, the group announced an indefinite hiatus. Mint officially left the group in 2016, leaving many to speculate that the group had disbanded.

== Members ==
- J. Min – leader, main vocalist
- Min Do-hee – lead vocalist
- Kim Myung-ji – main rapper, lead dancer, vocalist
- Mint – main dancer, lead rapper, vocalist

== Discography ==
=== Singles ===
Title	Year	Peak chart positions		Sales	Album
Title	Year	KOR	BEL	Sales	Album
As lead artist
"Tiny-G" (작은 거인)	2012	—	—	—N/a	Non-album singles
"Minimanimo" (미니마니모)	2013	60	—	KOR: 59,239+	Non-album singles
"Miss You" (보고파)	2013	91	—	KOR: 20,190+	Non-album singles
"Ice Baby"	2014	44	—	KOR: 77,451+	Non-album singles
Collaborations
"Love X4" (Remix) with Ian Thomas	2014	—	9	—N/a	Non-album single
Soundtrack appearances
"Polaris"	2012	—	—	—N/a	Music and Lyrics OST Part 3
"—" denotes songs did not chart or were not released in that region.
