= Mint (singer) =

Thai singer (born 1994)

Mint กุญช์ภัสส์ พรปวีณ์วรกุล
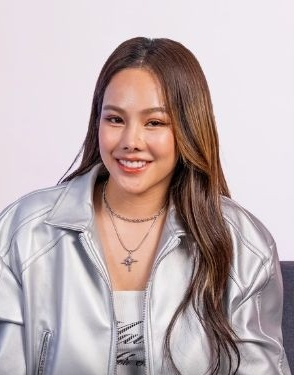
- Mintty in 2026

Background information
- Also known as: Mintty
- Born: Goonshipas Peonpaweevorakul; June 23, 1994 (age 32); Bangkok, Thailand
- Origin: South Korea
- Genres: K-pop
- Occupation: Singer
- Years active: 2012–present
- Labels: JSL; Rerun Music Korea
- Formerly of: Tiny-G; Tiny-G M

Goonshipas Peonpaweevorakul (Thai: กุญช์ภัสส์ พรปวีณ์วรกุล; RTGS: Kunphat Phonpawiworakun; born June 23, 1994), better known by the nickname Mint (Korean: 민트; Thai: มิ้นท์), also known as Mintty, is a Thai singer based in South Korea. She was a member of the South Korean girl group Tiny-G.

== Biography ==
She started dancing when she was 5, and at 11 years old was chosen to be a backup dancer for Thailand's most famous singer, Thongchai McIntyre. She has been in Thailand's dancing industry ever since.

In 2009, Mint participated in a cover dance contest in "Snowy Korea", an annual Korean festival in Thailand. She showed her exceptional dancing skills and was noticed by JYP Entertainment and GNG Production. She chose to be with GNG, which is how she started her career in South Korea.

In 2012, she debuted in the girl group Tiny-G as the group's main dancer/lead rapper/sub-vocalist alongside J.Min (leader, main vocals), Dohee (lead vocals) and Myeong Ji (main rapper, sub-vocalist). A representative from Tiny G's agency described them as, "Tiny G is a four-member girl group with an average height of 153cm. Although they are petite, they are a hip hop group who can b-boy. [...] They are short, but will present music of powerful feeling to separate themselves from the many other girl groups." The name "Tiny G" is a combination of the English words "tiny" and "giant".

Before their debut, the group appeared on MBC's show Show Champion on April 24, 2012 and performed the track "Polaris", which singer Jay Park and actress Lee Si-young had made for them as a gift through MBC's Music and Lyrics. The instrumentation was composed and produced by Cha Cha Malone and Jay Park. The song "Polaris" and was released on May 5. After Music and Lyrics was broadcast, Tiny-G became the number one searched term on many Korean search engines.

Their debut single "Tiny-G" was released on August 23, 2012, along with the music video. They made their debut on M! Countdown with "Tiny-G". The group released their second single, "미니마니모 (Minimanimo)" on January 21, 2013. The music video was released the same day. On June 13, 2013, the group performed an OST for the game Dragon Nest titled "Here We Go". On October 1, 2013, they released their third single, "보고파 (Bogopa, Miss You)". The music video was also released the same day.

Following member Myungji's departure, Tiny-G came back as a trio on July 3 with the song "Ice Baby".

On November 2, 2014, it was revealed that Mint would be a part of Tiny-G's first subunit "Tiny-G M" along with J.Min. Promoting mainly in Thailand, the duo released their first single, "The Only One", featuring Thai artist Natthew. The music video was released on November 25 and featured appearances by Natthew and Tiny-G member Dohee.

On February 10, 2015, GNG Production announced that Tiny-G was going into an indefinite hiatus, with Dohee continuing on as an actress, while Mint and J.Min would continue on with their singing careers.

Mint was a guest actress in the Thai series Plerng Tawan which has aired since August 31, 2015. She was a guest in the short series Zeal 5.

On April 7, 2016, Mint signed onto a new agency, JSL COMPANY. On April 14, 2016, she released her first solo single 'Already Go Lady (Ulleri Ggolleri, Already Go Lady)' under the new stage name 'Mintty'. The music video was also released the same day.

In 2017 she joined the cast of web drama The Idolmaster KR as well as the attached girl group "Real Girls Project".

Mint also went on to participate in KBS' The Unit Idol Rebooting Project but was eliminated at place 38.

== Discography ==
=== Singles ===
No.	Information	Track listing
1	Title: "얼레리 꼴레리 (Already Go Lady)" Label: Loen Entertainment Release date: April 14, 2016	1. "얼레리 꼴레리 / Already Go Lady" – lyrics: Ddolai Park, Peter Pan / music: Ddolai Park, Peter Pan, Michin Gijibae / arrangement: Dolai Park, Michin Gijibae / chorus: Hwanhee Kim; 2. "True Love" – lyrics: SOBOOM / music: SOBOOM / arrangement: SOBOOM / Chorus Joori Seo, Soyoung Lee; 3. "얼레리 꼴레리 / Already Go Lady (Inst.)" – music: Ddolai Park, Peter Pan, Michin Gijibae / arrangement: Dolai Park, Michin Gijibae / chorus: Hwanhee Kim; 4. "True Love (Inst.)" – music: SOBOOM / arrangement: SOBOOM / chorus: Joori Seo, Soyoung Lee
