= NC.A =

South Korean singer (born 1996)

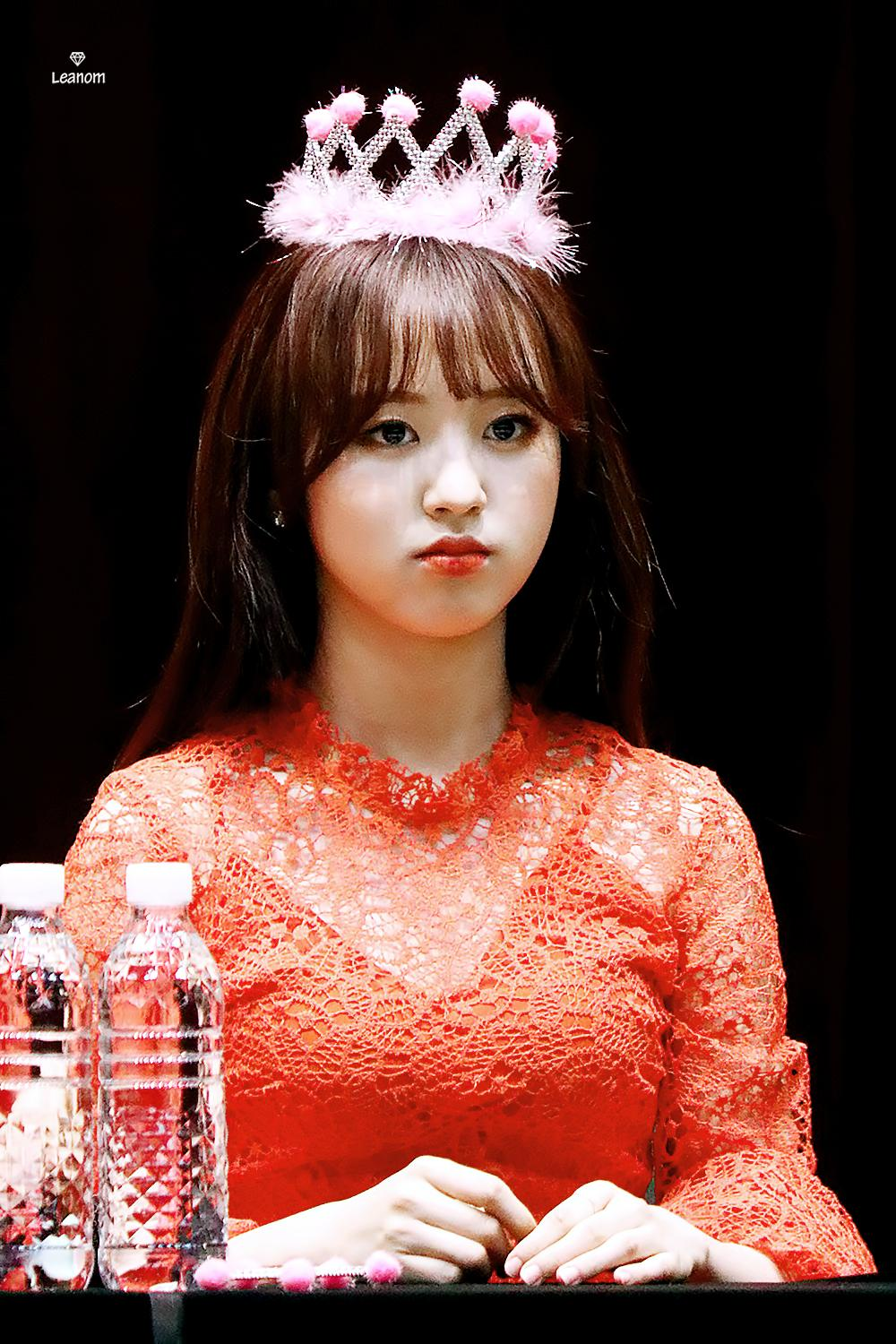
- NC.A in 2018
- Born: Im So-eun; October 7, 1996 (age 30); Osan, South Korea
- Occupations: Singer; actress
- Musical career
- Genre: K-pop
- Instrument: Vocals
- Years active: 2013–present
- Label: JPlanet
- Formerly of: Uni.T
- Website: jplanetentertainment.com/nca/

Korean name
- Hangul: 임소은
- Hanja: 任昭垠
- RR: Im Soeun
- MR: Im Soŭn

Im So-eun (Korean: 임소은; born October 7, 1996), better known as NC.A (Korean: 앤씨아), is a South Korean singer and actress. She debuted in August 2013 with the single "My Student Teacher". She was last active as a member of South Korean girl group Uni.T, until their disbandment in September 2018.

== Early life and education ==
NC.A was born on October 7, 1996.

She attended Osan Middle School then Hanlim Multi Art School, and graduated in February 2015.

== Career ==
=== Pre-debut ===
Towards her graduation of junior high school, NC.A started going to a music academy. She performed there, and someone had it video-taped and uploaded online. The video ended up in the hands of Chae Jong-ju, the CEO of JJHolic Media, who later called her in for an audition. Upon passing the auditions, she became a trainee.

In 2012, she performed in a concert of her label mate Yurisangja.

=== 2013: Debut with My Student Teacher and Oh My God ===
On August 11, 2013, NC.A released her debut digital single "My Student Teacher". The song, with lyrics talking about high school life, was composed by Park Seung-hwa of Yurisangja, written by Lee Ji-won and edited by Seo Jung-jin, which presented Lee Hye-ri.

She portrayed the role of a high school student in tvN's Reply 1994. The drama's producing director Shin Won-ho saw a pre-debut photo and asked her to audition for the drama.

On November 15, she released her second single "Oh My God", with her appearing in the music video this time.

=== 2014: Scent of NC.A, Crazy You & Hoo Hoo Hoo ===
On March 21, 2014, NC.A released her digital single "Hello Baby". Following this single, NC.A released her first mini-album on April 9. Along with Sungwon from A-Prince, NC.A was an MC of the new music show Ranking Reformat which aired from Monday to Friday at 12AM KST. The premiere was on April 7 . On the same date, the teaser of the MV "I'm Different" was released on NC.A's Official YouTube channel. On April 9, the music video for "I'm Different" was released.

On September 2 NC.A released a pre-release single "Crazy You" featuring Sims of MIB as a surprise for fans and also their upcoming studio album, NC.A released the music video on September 20.

On December 18 NC.A released the MV for Hoo Hoo Hoo.

=== 2015–present: Multiple solo singles, Time To Be A Woman and The Unit ===
On December 31 NC.A posted the teaser for her new single "Coming Soon" on her YouTube channel, announcing that it would come out January 5. Coming Soon is a song about a girl who wants to confess her feelings to the boy she's been admiring. She held her debut stage of "Coming Soon" on KBS's Music Bank January 2. The song and MV were released January 5. "Coming Soon" is NC.A's first try at rapping since her debut.

On February 21 NC.A announced that she would be coming back with a ballad song on March.

Through NC.A's official Facebook and Twitter it was announced on March 25 that the following day she would release her new single Cinderella Time and they posted the concept images. The single and MV were released on March 26 and in the MV Sungjae from BTOB and Dino from Halo appear.

It was announced that NC.A would make her comeback on July Through her official Facebook, NC.A posted a teaser for Vanilla Shake showing her in a short haircut and later posted that it would be released the 20th of the same month.

On July 20 NC.A released her new song Vanilla Shake and Jeong Jae Yong and NS Yoon-G were featured in the MV.

She released the OST "Instinct" for the drama The Law of the Jungle on the 23rd.

NC.A was cast in the drama Three by Three together with Fiestar's Jei and Dal Shabet's Jiyul.

Through the project to fund albums Makestar, NC.A released her first Korean studio album Time to Be A Woman that will be released in October 2016.

In October 2017, NC.A participated on South Korean survival reality show, The Unit. The concept of the show is to form male and female unit groups of nine members each, among idols who had already debuted. On the last episode NC.A ranked #3, thus making her one of the nine members of the temporary girlgroup Uni.T.

== Discography ==
=== Studio albums ===
| Title | Album details | Peak chart positions | Sales |
| Title | Album details | KOR | Sales |
|---|---|---|---|
| Time to Be a Woman | Released: October 28, 2016; Formats: CD, digital download; Label: JJ Holic Media; Track listing: 1. Next Station; 2. U in me 3. Hoo Hoo Hoo; 4. Vanilla Shake; 5. Coming Soon; 6. Curfew; 7. Look Crazy (Feat. Sims Of M.I.B); 8. How much more... (Feat. Shinji); 9. Instinct; 10. Next station (Inst.) | 26 | KOR: 643 |

=== Extended plays ===
| Title | Album details | Peak positions | Sales |
| Title | Album details | KOR | Sales |
|---|---|---|---|
| Scent of NC.A | Released: April 9, 2014; Label: JJ Holic Media; Format: CD, digital download; Track listing: 1. I'm Different; 2. Hello Baby; 3. My Student Teacher; 4. Oh My God; 5. I'm Different (Instrumental); 6. Hello Baby (Instrumental) | 16 | KOR: 1,230 |
| Some- | Released: May 10, 2019; Label: J Planet Entertainment; Format: CD, digital download | 37 | KOR: 768 |

=== Singles ===
==== As lead artist ====
| Title | Year | Peak chart positions | Sales (Note: Sales figures for tracks are based on digital downloads, except noted.) | Album |
| Title | Year | KOR | Sales | Album |
|---|---|---|---|---|
| "My Student Teacher" (교생쌤) | 2013 | 92 | KOR: 39,717 | Scent of NC.A |
| "Oh My God" | 2013 | 108 | KOR: 36,297 | Scent of NC.A |
| "Hello Baby" | 2014 | 107 | KOR: 36,735 | Scent of NC.A |
| "I'm Different" (난 좀 달라) | 2014 | 81 | KOR: 47,053 | Scent of NC.A |
| "Crazy You" (미쳤나봐) | 2014 | — | KOR: 21,839 | Time to Be a Woman |
| "Hoo Hoo Hoo" (후후후) | 2014 | — | KOR: 7,332 | Time to Be a Woman |
| "Coming Soon" | 2015 | — | KOR: 16,743 | Time to Be a Woman |
| "Cinderella Time" (통금시간) | 2015 | — | KOR: 22,429 | Time to Be a Woman |
| "Vanilla Shake" (바닐라 쉐이크) | 2015 | 123 | KOR: 20,073 | Time to Be a Woman |
| "U in Me" | 2016 | — | KOR: 22,904 | Time to Be a Woman |
| "Next Station" (다음역) | 2016 | — | —N/a | Time to Be a Woman |
| "I'm Fine" | 2018 | — | —N/a | Some- |
| "Awesome Breeze" (밤바람) | 2019 | — | —N/a | Some- |
| "Melody For You" (널 위한 멜로디) | 2021 | — | —N/a | 널 위한 멜로디 - Single |
| "My Student Teacher (2022 Version)" (교생쌤) | 2022 | 28 | —N/a | My Student Teacher (2022 Version) - Single |
| "Coming Soon (2022 Version)" | 2022 | 70 | —N/a | Coming Soon (2022 Version) - Single |
| "Love is Like Rain Outside the Window" (사랑은 창밖에 빗물 같아요) | 2022 | — | —N/a | 사랑은 창밖에 빗물 같아요 - Single |
| "I'm Different (2022 Remix Version)" (난 좀 달라) | 2022 | — | —N/a | I'm Different (2022 Remix Version) - Single |
| "No You, No Me (2022 Version)" (헤어질 자신 있니) | 2022 | — | —N/a | No You, No Me (2022 Version) - Single |
| "My Little" | 2023 | — | —N/a | My Little - Single |
"—" denotes releases that did not chart or were not released in that region.

==== As featured artist ====
| Title | Year | Peak chart positions | Album |
| Title | Year | KOR | Album |
|---|---|---|---|
| "Clouds And I" (Lee SeeJun and NC.A) | 2014 | — | Immortal Song: Summer Songs Special Part.2 |
| "Words I Want To Tell You All Night" (1SAgain featuring NC.A) | 2015 | — | Non-album singles |
| "Stars In The Night Sky 7" (Yang Jung Seung, NC.A & Goo Bon Seung) | 2015 | — | Non-album singles |
"—" denotes releases that did not chart or were not released in that region.

=== Collaborations ===
| Title | Year | Peak chart positions | Sales | Album |
| Title | Year | KOR | Sales | Album |
|---|---|---|---|---|
| "How Long Time.." (얼마나 더..) (with Shin Ji) | 2015 | — | | Time To Be A Woman |
| "Playing With Fire" (봄에 오면 괴롭힐 거예요) (with Yook Sung-jae) | 2016 | 89 | KOR: 25,667 | Some- |
| "Love Me" (읽어주세요) (with Sugarbowl) | 2017 | — | | Love Me - Single |
| "So Do You" (노래방에서) (with Seo Eunkwang) | 2018 | — (Note: "So Do You" did not enter the Gaon Digital Chart, but appeared at number 62 on Download component chart.) | | Some- |
| "No You, No Me" (헤어질 자신 있니) (with Hynn) | 2019 | 68 | | No You, No Me - Single |
| "Stay Home" (with Josub) | 2019 | — | | Favorite Chart, Pt. 1 |
| "Flashback" (생각이 똑똑) (with TIKITIK, Yoo Jun-ho, and LUNARSOLAR's Jian) | 2020 | — | | Favorite Chart, Pt. 2 |
| "leave you for a while..." (잠시 헤어지는거야) (with Namgung Eunju) | 2022 | — | | leave you for a while... - Single |
"—" denotes releases that did not chart or were not released in that region.

=== Soundtrack appearances ===
| Title | Year | Peak chart positions | Sales | Drama |
| Title | Year | KOR | Sales | Drama |
|---|---|---|---|---|
| "Only 5 Minutes More" (NC.A, Sangdo & Yano from Topp Dogg) | 2015 | — | | A Girl Who Sees Smells OST |
| "Instinct" | 2015 | — | | Law of the Jungle OST |
| "Even If a Memorable Day Comes" | 2016 | 17 | KOR: 164,498 | Reply 1988 OST |
| "More & More" | 2018 | — | | Risky Romance OST |
| "Kiss Me" | 2019 | — | | Perfume (2019 TV series) OST |
| "How About Your Day?" | 2019 | — | | Goodbye, Hello OST |
| "Something" (어떻게 할까?) | 2021 | — | | Sometoon 2021 OST |
"—" denotes releases that did not chart or were not released in that region.

== Videography ==
=== Music videos ===
| Year | Title | Length | Notes |
|---|---|---|---|
| 2013 | "My Student Teacher (Drama Ver.)" | 03:52 | Debut MV starring Girl's Day's Hyeri directed by NAIVE Creative Productions |
| 2013 | "My Student Teacher (Lip Ver.)" | 03:34 | directed by NAIVE Creative Productions |
| 2013 | "Oh My God" | 03:19 | |
| 2014 | "I'm Different" | 03:29 | |
| 2014 | "Crazy You" | 03:27 | |
| 2014 | "Hoo Hoo Hoo" | 00:56 | |
| 2015 | "Coming Soon" | 03:21 | |
| 2015 | "Cinderella Time" | 03:41 | With Sungjae from BTOB and Dino from Halo |
| 2015 | "Vanilla Shake" | 03:32 | With Jeong Jae Yong and NS Yoon-G |
| 2015 | "How Long Time..." | 03:42 | With Shinji |
| 2016 | "Next Station" | 03:48 | |
| 2017 | "Love Me" | 04:11 | With Haneul |
| 2018 | "I'm Fine" | 03:34 | |
| 2019 | "Awesome Breeze (Drama Ver.)" | 04:46 | With SF9's Rowoon, LUNARSOLAR's Taeryeong & Jian, and Lee Suji |
| 2019 | "Awesome Breeze (NC.A Ver.)" | 03:56 | |

=== Music video appearances ===
| Year | Song title | Artist |
|---|---|---|
| 2014 | "치사치사치사" | Seo Young Eun |
| 2015 | "Did You Eat?" | The Shorties |

== Filmography ==
=== Variety Shows ===
| Year | Channel | Show | Note |
|---|---|---|---|
| 2013 | SBS | Cultwo Show | |
| 2014 | MBC Every 1 | Weekly Idol | Made a cameo on the episode of Hyosung. |
| 2014 | Arirang | Pops in Seoul | |
| 2014 | MBC | Ailee's Vitamin | Guest on the first episode |
| 2014 | KBS | Happy Together 3 | Guest on the episode 346 |
| 2014 | Tooniverse | Thunderstruck Stationary 2 | Kids Show |
| 2014 | MBC Music | NC.A in Fukuoka | There are 4 episodes in total |
| 2015 | Arirang | Arirang Radio | |
| 2015 | SBS | Star King | |
| 2015 | KBS | Hello Counselor | |
| 2015 | Arirang | Pops in Seoul | |
| 2015 | KBS2 | Crisis Escape Number 1 | |
| 2015 | MBC | King of Mask Singer | Guest Judge |
| 2015 | OGN | OnGameNet From Start Till Clear | Guest on ep 226, 231, 232 |
| 2015 | JTBC | Hidden Singer 4 | Panelist, Impersonator (Shin Ji's Episode) |
| 2016 | MBC | King of Mask Singer | Contestant as "Don't Forget Me a Forget-me-not", episodes 77–78 |
| 2017 | KBS | The Unit: Idol Rebooting Project | Finalist - 3rd Place |

=== Drama ===
| Year | Network | Drama | Role |
|---|---|---|---|
| 2013 | tvN | Reply 1994 | Student/friend of Sooksookie (Yook Sung-jae) |
| 2014 | Tooniverse | Thunderstruck Stationery 2 | As NC.A |
| 2015 | Web drama | Three by Three | TBA |
| 2018 | KBS 2TV | To. Jenny | Eileen (cameo) |
| 2020 | JTBC | Itaewon Class | Bok-hee's friend (cameo) |
| 2021 | Seezn | Sometoon 2021 | Ye-ra (Ep.3) / Sophie (Ep.10) / Hak No-hyeo (Ep.13) / Dan-bi (Ep.16) / So-mi (Ep.17) / Tak Mi-ryeo (Ep.20) |
| TBA | B-PLAY | Phantom School | Kang Yu-na |

=== TV programs ===
- 2014: Ranking Reformat 8
