= Wings (duo) =

South Korean musical duo

- Origin: South Korea
- Genre: K-pop
- Years active: 2014–2018
- Labels: Sony Music Korea (2014-2018); Dal&Byul Music
- Members: Yeseul; Nayoung

Wings (Korean: 윙스; often stylized all caps) was a South Korean female duo formed by Sony Music Korea in 2014. The duo consists of leader Yeseul and Nayoung.

The duo's debut single "Hair Short" was released on March 12, 2014 and their follow-up single "Blossom" on July 3, 2014.

== Career ==
=== Pre-debut ===
The duo was officially announced on February 27, 2014 via their Facebook page. The duo was formed when both of them, during their trainee days, recorded guide vocals for the Korean version of Little Mix's single, "Wings." After watching the performance, the label like the idea for the two singers to team up which led to the formation of the duo.

=== 2014: Debut with "Hair Short", "Blossom" ===
Wings released their debut song "Hair Short" digitally, along with its instrumental on iTunes and multiple South Korean digital music stores on March 12, 2014. The music video was released on the same day and features actor Ahn Jae-hyun.

The duo's second single, "Blossom", was announced on June 16, 2014 along with a teaser picture of Yeseul and Nayoung in floral dresses walking in a field of flowers. The single was released digitally on iTunes and South Korean digital music stores, as well physically on July 3, 2014. The single includes the instrumental to "Blossom" as well as their first single "Hair Short" and its instrumental.

The duo appeared in Kim Woo Joo's music video for "The City of Summer Night", released on August 1, 2014. The duo also appeared in Yang Song E's music video for "Smiling Goodbye", released on October 10.

=== 2017: Idolmaster, The Unit & departure from Sony ===
The duo appeared in SBS Plus's drama, The Idolmaster KR and KBS's The Unit: Idol Rebooting Project. In July, it was revealed that Wings had left their label, Sony Music Entertainment Korea.

== Members ==
- Kang Yeseul
- Jin Nayoung

== Discography ==
=== Singles ===
Title	Year	Peak chart positions		Sales	Album
Title	Year	KOR	KOR Hot 100	Sales	Album
"Hair Short" (헤어숏)	2014	131	—	KOR (CD): 868	Blossom (single)
"Blossom" (feat. Baechigi) (꽃이 폈어요)	2014	—	—	KOR (CD): 868	Blossom (single)
"—" denotes releases that did not chart or were not released in that region.

=== Music videos ===
List of music videos, showing year released and director
Title	Year	Director(s)	Ref.
"Hair Short"	2014	Digipedi	
"Blossom"	2014	Park Jun-su	
