= Lee Su-ji =

South Korean singer (born 1998)

Suji
- 이수지
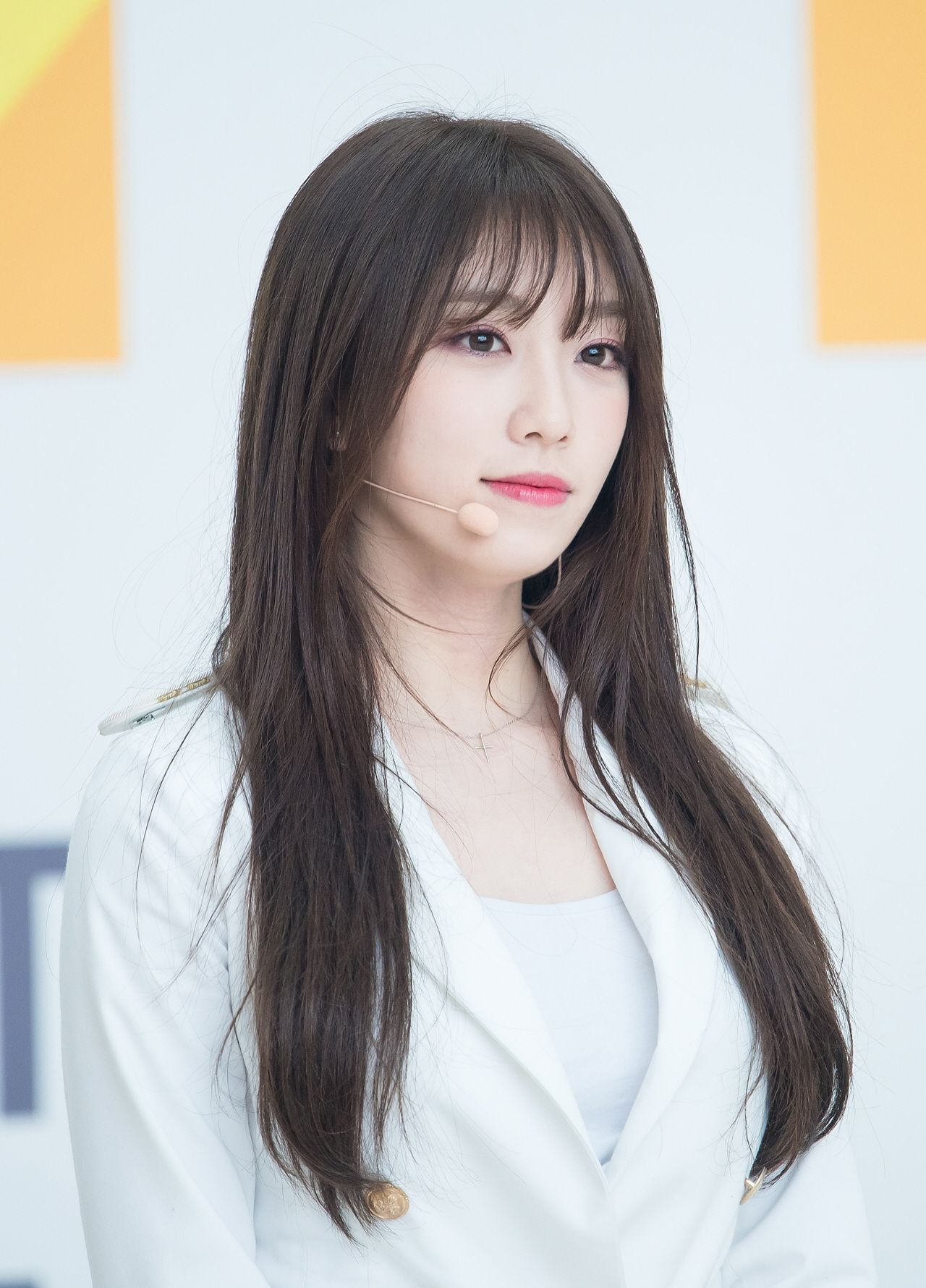
- Lee in February 2018
- Born: Lee Su-ji; March 20, 1998 (age 28); Busan, South Korea
- Other name: Halla
- Education: Hanlim Multi Art School
- Occupations: Singer; actress
- Spouse: Ko Hyoung-woo (m. 2023)
- Musical career
- Genre: K-pop
- Instrument: Vocals
- Years active: 2014–present
- Labels: Music K; Apple of the Eye
- Formerly of: The Ark; Uni.T

Korean name
- Hangul: 이수지
- Hanja: 李繡至
- RR: I Suji
- MR: I Suji

Stage name
- Hangul: 한라
- Hanja: 漢拏
- RR: Hanra
- MR: Halla

Lee Su-ji (Korean: 이수지; born March 20, 1998), also known mononymously as Suji and Halla, is a South Korean singer and actress. She debuted as a member of the South Korean girl group The Ark and later was a member of the project girl group UNI.T. She was also a member of Real Girls Project as part of her acting role in The Idolmaster KR.

== Early life and education ==
Lee Su-ji was born on March 20, 1998, in Busan, South Korea. She grew up in Daegu, South Korea. She attended Hanlim Multi Art School learning Broadcasting & Entertainment Department in Seoul and graduated on February 10, 2017. She joined Music K Entertainment in 2013 and trained for two years.

== Career ==
In 2014, Lee appeared in the music video of labelmate Hong Jin-young's song "Cheer Up". On April 12, 2015, she debuted as a member of Music K Entertainment's new girl group The Ark under the stage name "Halla". The group released one single, "The Light", before going on hiatus. In March 2016, it was unofficially announced that the group had disbanded a month before. On April 26, 2016, Lee joined the auditions for The Idolmaster KR, a Korean drama loosely based on the Japanese raising simulation and rhythm video game series The Idolmaster, where she played the main lead and her twin sister. On August 25, she debuted as a member of girl group Real Girls Project, which was formed for the drama. On November 4, 2017, Lee joined The Unit: Idol Rebooting Project. She won a final spot on Top 9 and became a part of the group called UNI.T.

== Personal life ==
On September 5, 2023, Lee announced her engagement to her boyfriend through Instagram. Lee and actor Ko Hyoung-woo married on October 7, 2023, in Seoul.

== Discography ==
Title	Year	Peak chart positions	Sales	Album
Title	Year	KOR	Sales	Album
Soundtrack appearances
"Memories" (메모리즈) (with Jeewon)	2017	—	—	The Idolmaster KR OST
"—" denotes releases that did not chart or were not released in that region.

== Filmography ==
=== Television drama ===
Year	Title	Role	Notes	Ref.
2017	The Idolmaster KR	Lee Su-ji/Lee Su-ah		
2020	Handmade Love	Han Sa-rang	Streaming series	

=== Television shows ===
Year	Title	Role	Notes	Ref.
2016	Pops in Seoul		Panelist with Real Girls Project	
2017	Stargram		Panelist with Real Girls Project	
2017–2018	The Unit: Idol Rebooting Project	Contestant		

=== Hosting ===
Year	Title	Notes	Ref.
2017	Music Bank	Special MC	
