= The Idolmaster KR =

South Korean television drama

- Promotional poster
- Hangul: 아이돌마스터.KR - 꿈을 드림
- Lit.: Idolmaster KR: Giving the dream
- RR: Aidolmaseuteo.KR - kkumeul deurim
- MR: Aidolmasŭt'ŏ.KR - kkumŭl tŭrim
- Genre: Drama
- Based on: The Idolmaster by Bandai Namco Entertainment
- Starring: Kim Sori; Heo Youngjoo; Yukika Teramoto; Kwon Haseo; Lee Jeewon; Mint; Lee Yeeun; Cha Jiseul; Lee Suji; Chun Jane; Jung Taeri; Sung Hoon; Park Chul-min; Kang Yeseul; Lee Ka-eun
- Country of origin: South Korea
- Original language: Korean
- No. of episodes: 24

Production
- Production companies: Interactive Media Mix, Inc

Original release
- Network: SBS Plus, SBS funE, SBS MTV (pay TV); Amazon Video (streaming)
- Release: April 28 (Note: SBS Plus, SBS funE, and SBS MTV) – October 6, 2017

The Idolmaster KR (stylized The IDOLM@STER.KR) is a South Korean television drama based on Bandai Namco Entertainment's The Idolmaster video game series. It premiered on Amazon Prime Video on April 28, 2017 as an Amazon original series. It ran for 24 episodes.

The series was later picked up by the SBS-owned pay TV channels SBS Plus, SBS funE, and SBS MTV. It premiered on these channels on April 28, 2017.

== Cast ==
Real Girls Project

- Lee Su-ji (이수지) as Suji/Suah
- Heo Youngjoo (허영주) as Youngjoo
- Sori (김소리) as Sori
- Yukika Teramoto (寺本來可 / 테라모토 유키카) as Yukika
- Kwon Ha-seo (권하서) as Haseo
- Lee Jee-won (이지원) as Jeewon
- Jung Tae-ri (정태리) as Taeri
- Mint (민트) as Mint
- Lee Ye-eun (이예은) as Yeeun
- Cha Ji-seul (차지슬) as Jiseul
- Chun Jane (천재인) as Jane

Red Queen

- Jo So-jin as Hyeju
- Kim Sun-young as Mina
- Han Hye-ri as Yeri
- Lee Ka-eun as Chae Na-kyung

825 Entertainment

- Sung Hoon as Kang Shin-hyuk, the former Producer of Red Queen.
- Park Chul-min as Shim Min-chul, CEO of 825 Entertainment.
- Kang Ye-seul as Yeseul, the girls' manager at 825 Entertainment.

Other characters

- Heo Joungjoo as Joungjoo, Youngjoo's younger sister who is a singer-songwriter.
- Lee Coco as Coco, an internet broadcast MC.
- Jin Nayoung as Nayoung, Sori's friend.
- Bae Seul-ki as Kim Dan-oh, a composer and vocal trainer.

Cameo

- Kim Jung-ah as vocal training judge
- Jung Tae-woo
- Euna Kim as a rapper
- Gowoon as Bomi
- Jung Hee-chul as Haseo's brother
- Lee Moo-saeng as Chief Yang

== Production ==
On October 13, 2016, The Idolmaster KR official website posted a notice of a member replacement; an original member of Real Girl Project, Hanabyul, had been replaced by sub-member Jiseul for the series, as Hanabyul was noted to have suffered from a leg injury. One month later, it was revealed that After School's Lee Ka-eun, Nine Muses' Sojin, Tahiti's Ari and I.B.I's Han Hye-ri would be joining the cast as members of 'Red Queen', a popular girl group at the time of Real Girl Project's debut, in the live-action series.

== Soundtrack ==
=== Korean releases ===
==== OST Part 1 ====
Released on May 15, 2017
No.	Title	Lyrics	Music	Arrangement	Length
1.	"Kkumeul Dream" (꿈을 Dream, sung by Real Girls Project)	Kamen Rider	Kamen Rider	Kamen Rider	03:07
2.	"One For All" (sung by Real Girls Project)	Kamen Rider	Kamen Rider	Kamen Rider	03:10
3.	"Memories" (메모리즈, sung by Suji and Jeewon)	Kamen Rider	Kamen Rider	Kamen Rider	03:42
4.	"Lost In The Summer" (sung by Jane and Joungjoo)	Albi Albertsson	Albi Albertsson	Albi Albertsson	03:24
Total length:					13:23

==== OST Part 2 ====
Released on May 22, 2017
No.	Title	Lyrics	Music	Arrangement	Length
1.	"Super Girl Magic" (sung by Red Queen)	Pinch Hitter	Steven Lee; Andreas Oberg; Maria Marcus	Maria Marcus	03:12
2.	"Acacia" (sung by Red Queen)	Kamen Rider	Kamen Rider	Kamen Rider	03:28
3.	"Attention" (sung by Red Queen)	Yung Kyoung (Jam Factory); Song Carat (Jam Factory)	Steven Lee; RIKE BOOMGAARDEN	Steven Lee	03:39
Total length:					10:19

==== OST Part 3 ====
Released on June 16, 2017
No.	Title	Lyrics	Music	Arrangement	Length
1.	"I Must Go! (Note: Original song by 765 Production.)" (sung by Real Girls Project)	Jam Factory; Hiroyuki Onoda	Koji Nakagawa; Keiki Kobayashi	Keiki Kobayashi	07:14
2.	"Growl (Note: Original song by EXO.)" (으르렁, sung by Rookie Team)	Seo Ji-eum	Jordan Kyle; John Major; Jarah Gibson; DK; Hyuk Shin; Master Key	Jordan Kyle; John Major; Hyuk Shin	03:28
3.	"2nd Confession (Note: Original song by BtoB.)" (두번째 고백, sung by Debut Team)	Seo Jae-woo; Seo Young-bae; Lee Min-hyuk; Jung Il-hoon	Seo Jae-woo; Seo Young-bae	Seo Jae-woo; Seo Young-bae	03:55
4.	"Wanna Be Your Star" (sung by Haseo, Jane, and Yeeun)	OBROS; Haseo	Master Key; OBROS	Master Key; OBROS	04:05
Total length:					18:42

==== OST Part 4 ====
Released on October 13, 2017
No.	Title	Lyrics	Music	Arrangement	Length
1.	"Not End...But And!!" (sung by Real Girls Project)	Kamen Rider	Kamen Rider	Kamen Rider	03:05
2.	"Let's Get Started" (sung by Real Girls Project)	Kamen Rider	Kamen Rider	Kamen Rider	03:20
3.	"The World Is All One!!" (sung by Real Girls Project)	Jam Factory; RIONA	Tashiro Tomokazu	Araki Keiroku	03:10
Total length:					09:35

=== Japanese releases ===
==== Episode 1 ====
Released on April 7, 2017
No.	Title	Lyrics	Music	Arrangement	Length
1.	"Kkumeul Dream" (꿈을 Dream, sung by Real Girls Project)	Kamen Rider	Kamen Rider	Kamen Rider	03:07
2.	"The Idolmaster" (sung by B-Side (Sori, Yukika, Jeewon, Yeeun, Jiseul))	Jam Factory (Korean lyric); Megumi Nakamura	Hiroto Sasaki	Hiroto Sasaki	02:56
3.	"Acacia" (sung by Red Queen)	Kamen Rider	Kamen Rider	Kamen Rider	03:29
4.	"One For All" (sung by Real Girls Project)	Kamen Rider	Kamen Rider	Kamen Rider	03:10
Total length:					12:42

==== Episode 2 ====
Released on July 25, 2017
No.	Title	Lyrics	Music	Arrangement	Length
1.	"Lost In The Summer" (sung by Jane and Joungjoo)	Albi Albertsson	Albi Albertsson	Albi Albertsson	03:24
2.	"Memories" (메모리즈, sung by Suji and Jeewon)	Kamen Rider	Kamen Rider	Kamen Rider	03:42
3.	"Super Girl Magic" (sung by Red Queen)	Pinch Hitter	Steven Lee; Andreas Oberg; Maria Marcus	Maria Marcus	03:12
4.	"Attention" (sung by Red Queen)	Yung Kyoung (Jam Factory); Song Carat (Jam Factory)	Steven Lee; RIKE BOOMGAARDEN	Steven Lee	03:39
Total length:					13:57

==== Episode 3 ====
Released on August 16, 2017
No.	Title	Lyrics	Music	Arrangement	Length
1.	"I Must Go!" (sung by Real Girls Project)	Jam Factory; Hiroyuki Onoda	Koji Nakagawa; Keiki Kobayashi	Keiki Kobayashi	07:14
2.	"Wanna Be Your Star" (sung by Haseo, Jane, and Yeeun)	OBROS; Haseo	Master Key; OBROS	Master Key; OBROS	04:05
Total length:					11:19

==== Episode 4 ====
Released on August 16, 2017
No.	Title	Lyrics	Music	Arrangement	Length
1.	"Growl" (으르렁, sung by Rookie Team)	Seo Ji-eum	Jordan Kyle; John Major; Jarah Gibson; DK; Hyuk Shin; Master Key	Jordan Kyle; John Major; Hyuk Shin	03:28
2.	"2nd Confession" (두번째 고백, sung by Debut Team)	Seo Jae-woo; Seo Young-bae; Lee Min-hyuk; Jung Il-hoon	Seo Jae-woo; Seo Young-bae	Seo Jae-woo; Seo Young-bae	03:55
Total length:					07:23

==== Episode 5 ====
Released on October 29, 2017
No.	Title	Lyrics	Music	Arrangement	Length
1.	"Not End...But And!!" (sung by Real Girls Project)	Kamen Rider	Kamen Rider	Kamen Rider	03:05
2.	"Let's Get Started" (sung by Real Girls Project)	Kamen Rider	Kamen Rider	Kamen Rider	03:20
3.	"The World Is All One!!" (sung by Real Girls Project)	Jam Factory (music publisher); RIONA	Tashiro Tomokazu	Araki Keiroku	03:10
Total length:					09:35

== Discography ==
=== Singles ===
Title	Year	Peak chart positions	Singer(s)	Album
Title	Year	KOR	Singer(s)	Album
"Kkeumeul Dream" (꿈을 Dream)	2016	—	Real Girls Project	Kkeumeul Dream
"The Idolm@ster" (Note: Credited under B-Side, Real Girls Project sub-unit.)	2017	—	Sori, Yukika, Jeewon, Yeeun, Jiseul	Non-album single
"Pingpong Game"	2017	—	Suji, Sori, Yukika, Jeewon, Yeeun	Non-album single
"—" denotes releases that did not chart or were not released in that region.
