= 2nd Confession =

2013 single by BtoB

Single by BtoB
- Released: April 10, 2013
- Recorded: 2013
- Genre: K-pop; R&B
- Length: 3:54
- Label: Cube
- Songwriters: Yong-bae; Seo Jae-woo; Lee Minhyuk; Jung Ilhoon
- Producers: Seo Yong-bae; Seo Jae-woo

BtoB singles chronology
"WOW" (2012)	"2nd Confession" (2013)	"Thriller" (2013)

Music video
- "두 번째 고백 (2nd Confession)" on YouTube

"2nd Confession" (Korean: 두 번째 고백) is a song recorded by South Korean boy band BtoB, released on April 10, 2013.

== Background ==
The digital single titled "2nd Confession" was released as a digital single through various music sites on April 10. The song is said to be a thank-you present to their fans, as well as a way to celebrate their 1st anniversary since debut.

== Composition ==
The song was written by and composed by Seo Yong-bae and Seo Jae-woo, and BtoB members Lee Minhyuk and Jung Ilhoon participated in writing the lyrics. As stated on their official website: "The single "2nd Confession" is a sweet track embraced by the warmth of spring. The track tells a story of a guy who confesses his unaffected loving feeling towards his ex-lover. The track's soothing melody and the narration in the beginning of the track allows the 90's radio kids to reminiscence about their past. On top of it, witty lyrics will put a smile on your face."

== Music video ==
A video teaser for the song and music video was released on April 7. It shows member Lee Minhyuk and Danny Ahn from g.o.d on a radio program, reading a letter from a listener who wants to make their second confession to a girl. The full music video was released on April 11, one day after the song.

== Promotions ==
The group debuted the song on April 11, performing on Mnet's music show M! Countdown, followed by performances on Music Bank, Show! Music Core and Inkigayo.

== Track listing ==
No.	Title	Lyrics	Music	Arrangement	Length
1.	"Second Confession" (두 번째 고백; Du Beonjjae Gobaek)	Seo Yong-bae, Seo Jae-woo, Lee Min-hyuk, Jung Il-hoon	Seo Yong-bae, Seo Jae-woo	Seo Yong-bae, Seo Jae-woo	3:55
2.	"Second Confession" (두 번째 고백; Du Beonjjae Gobaek) (Instrumental)		Seo Yong-bae, Seo Jae-woo	Seo Yong-bae, Seo Jae-woo	3:55
Total length:					7:50

== Chart performance ==
=== Charts ===
Chart	Peak position
Gaon Weekly singles chart	44
Billboard K-Pop Hot 100	35

== Release history ==
Country	Date	Format	Label
South Korea	April 10, 2013	Digital download	Cube Entertainment; Universal Music Group
