= 2017 in South Korean music =

The following is a list of notable events and releases that happened in 2017 in music in South Korea.

== Debuting and disbanded in 2017 ==
=== Debuting groups ===
- 14U
- A.C.E
- Adoy
- Be.A
- Busters
- Dreamcatcher
- Duetto
- Elris
- Favorite
- Golden Child
- Good Day
- GreatGuys
- HashTag
- Highlight
- Honeyst
- Hyeongseop X Euiwoong
- IZ
- JBJ
- Kard
- Longguo & Shihyun
- Mind U
- MVP
- MXM
- Myteen
- NU'EST W
- ONF
- P.O.P
- Pristin
- Rainz
- Seven O'Clock
- Skye
- S.I.S
- The Boyz
- The Rose
- Top Secret
- TRCNG
- Triple H
- Varsity
- Wanna One
- Weki Meki

=== Solo debuts ===
- Bibi
- Dalchong
- DPR Live
- I
- I'll
- Jang Han-byul
- Jeong Se-woon
- Jeon So-yeon
- Kang Si-ra
- Kevin Oh
- Kim Chung-ha
- Kim So-hee
- Kriesha Chu
- Lee Hae-ri
- Leellamarz
- Minzy
- One
- Parannoul
- Punch
- Ravi
- Samuel
- Seohyun
- Sojung
- Soyou
- Suzy
- Woo Won-jae
- Youngji

=== Disbanded groups ===
- 2AM
- 2Eyes
- Beatwin
- Big Brain
- Blady
- Boys24
- Chocolat
- D.Holic
- High4
- History
- I.B.I
- INX
- I.O.I
- Infinite H
- Leessang
- Madtown
- M.I.B
- Miss A
- Onnine Ibalgwan
- Phantom
- Sistar
- Sistar19
- Spica
- T-ara QBS
- The Legend
- Two X
- Unicorn
- Wonder Girls

== Releases in 2017 ==
=== First quarter ===
==== January ====
| Date | Album | Artist(s) | Genre(s) |
|---|---|---|---|
| 2 | Remember | S.E.S. | R&B, Ballad |
| 2 | Angel's Knock | AOA | Dance, Electropop |
| 2 | Unchanging: Touch | Shinhwa | Dance |
| 3 | Winter | Akdong Musician | Folk-pop, Ballad |
| 4 | Time's Up | Top Secret | Dance |
| 4 | From. WJSN | Cosmic Girls | Synthpop |
| 4 | Prelude | April | Synthpop, Dance |
| 6 | Limitless | NCT 127 | Hip hop, Electronic |
| 6 | Romance | Vromance | Ballad |
| 6 | Make Some Noise | MAS | Electronic |
| 9 | I Think I Love U | Sonamoo | Dance |
| 9 | R.eal1ze | Ravi | Rap |
| 11 | Mystery of Venus | Hello Venus | Dance, R&B |
| 11 | Romantic Show | Eve | Rock |
| 12 | 77-1X3-00 | Jun.K | R&B, Hip hop |
| 12 | I Dream | I | Dance |
| 12 | Weightlifting Fairy Kim Bok-joo OST | Various | OST |
| 13 | Nightmare | Dreamcatcher | Pop-rock, Ballad |
| 13 | Project. Nabla | Broken Valentine | Alternative rock |
| 16 | YeoJin | Yeojin | Dance |
| 16 | Love Affair | Niel | Dance |
| 17 | Crystyle | CLC | Dance, Electronic |
| 17 | Don't Say No | Seohyun | R&B, Pop |
| 18 | Notebook | Park Kyung | Hip hop |
| 18 | Dr. Romantic OST | Various | OST |
| 19 | Sira | Kang Si-ra | Ballad, Dance |
| 20 | Legend of the Blue Sea OST | Various | OST |
| 20 | Stardust | Kevin Oh | Ballad |
| 23 | Season of Suffering | San E | Hip hop |
| 24 | Yes? No? | Suzy | R&B |
| 25 | Guardian: The Lonely and Great God OST | Various | OST |
| 25 | Night Light OST | Various | OST |
| 31 | Love Letter | Huh Gak | Ballad |

==== February ====
| Date | Album | Artist(s) | Genre(s) |
|---|---|---|---|
| 1 | OO | Zion.T | R&B |
| 1 | Rookie | Red Velvet | Pop, R&B |
| 2 | Universe | Yoo Jae-hwan, Dongwoon | Dance, Ballad |
| 6 | Burning Sensation | SF9 | Dance |
| 7 | The First Person | Jung Joon-young | Ballad, Rock |
| 8 | Mirror | Cross Gene | Dance |
| 9 | The First | NCT Dream | Dance, Bubblegum |
| 13 | You Never Walk Alone | BTS | Hip hop, electronic |
| 13 | B.I.G Rebirth | B.I.G | Dance |
| 14 | Stardom | Bigflo | Dance |
| 15 | Kiss on the Lips | Melody Day | Dance |
| 17 | Limbo | Dean | R&B |
| 20 | Twicecoaster: Lane 2 | Twice | Dance |
| 21 | Hwarang: The Poet Warrior Youth OST | Various | OST |
| 22 | Winter Dream | Astro | Dance |
| 22 | Sketchbook | 100% | Dance |
| 23 | An Obvious Melo | Gavy NJ | Dance, Ballad |
| 23 | Circle's Dream | Subin | Ballad |
| 23 | Guess I Loved You | 2BiC | R&B |
| 23 | Trumpet Of The Cliff OST | Various | OST |
| 26 | R U Ready? | Lovelyz | Dance, Bubblegum |
| 27 | Blessed | High4 | Dance |
| 27 | Act. 2 Narcissus | Gugudan | Dance |
| 28 | My Voice | Taeyeon | Pop, R&B |
| 28 | Muggles' Mansion | Code Kunst | Hip hop |
| 28 | Blow Breeze OST | Various | OST |

==== March ====
| Date | Album | Artist(s) | Genre(s) |
|---|---|---|---|
| 2 | Ready | Victon | Dance, Ballad |
| 2 | Parkjiyoon9 | Park Ji-yoon | Folk, Ballad |
| 6 | Feel'eM | BtoB | Dance, Ballad |
| 6 | The Awakening | GFriend | Dance |
| 7 | Rose | B.A.P | Dance, Rock |
| 7 | Rollin' | Brave Girls | Dance, R&B |
| 8 | AM To PM 5-11-1 | Kim Hyung-jun | R&B |
| 8 | Without U | Romeo | Dance |
| 11 | High School Rapper Regional Competition Part.1 | Various | Rap |
| 13 | Flight Log: Arrival | Got7 | Dance, Hip hop |
| 13 | Manifest | MVP | Dance |
| 13 | Love & Live | Loona 1/3 | Synthpop, Ballad |
| 14 | Introverted Boss OST | Various | OST |
| 15 | Coming To You Live | DPR Live | Hip hop |
| 16 | Love Is A Dog From Hell | Mad Clown | Hip hop |
| 16 | Butterfly Effect | Seven O'Clock | Dance, Ballad |
| 18 | High School Rapper Regional Competition Part.2 | Various | Rap |
| 19 | Episode 1 | Pretty Brown | R&B |
| 20 | Can You Feel It? | Highlight | Dance, R&B |
| 20 | 7°CN | CNBLUE | Rock |
| 21 | Hi! Pristin | Pristin | Dance |
| 21 | The Clan Pt. 2.5: The Final Chapter | Monsta X | Dance, Hip hop |
| 27 | Girl's Day Everyday#5 | Girl's Day | Dance, Ballad |
| 28 | Reborn | Dok2 | Hip hop |
| 30 | G2's Life | G2 | Hip hop |
| 31 | Blade & Soul OST | Various | OST |

=== Second quarter ===
==== April ====
| Date | Album | Artist(s) | Genre(s) |
|---|---|---|---|
| 1 | High School Rapper Final | Various | Rap |
| 3 | Coloring Book | Oh My Girl | Dance, Ballad |
| 4 | Fate Number For | Winner | Dance, Ballad |
| 4 | 5 Songs For Initiation | Giriboy | Hip hop |
| 5 | My Voice (Deluxe Edition) | Taeyeon | R&B, Pop rock |
| 5 | Fall Asleep In The Mirror | Dreamcatcher | Pop rock |
| 6 | SM Station Season 1 | Various | Various |
| 6 | AM To PM 7-5-11-3 | Kim Hyung-jun | R&B |
| 7 | Good Manager OST | Various | OST |
| 10 | Eclipse | EXID | Dance, R&B |
| 10 | High Five | Teen Top | Dance |
| 10 | The Space | Eunji | Folk, Ballad |
| 11 | Steal Your Heart | Unit Black | Dance |
| 13 | Color TV | Wassup | Hip hop |
| 14 | The Sun, The Moon | Kisum | Hip hop |
| 14 | Strong Woman Do Bong-soon OST | Various | OST |
| 15 | Our Gap-soon OST | Various | OST |
| 17 | Miss This Kiss | Laboum | Dance, R&B |
| 17 | Minzy Work 01. "Uno" | Minzy | Dance, R&B |
| 17 | ViVi | Vivi | Synthpop |
| 18 | Spring Falling | Yesung | Folk, Rock |
| 18 | Breaking Sensation | SF9 | Dance, R&B |
| 19 | YOLO | DIA | Dance, Ballad |
| 19 | h | Lee Hae-ri | Ballad |
| 20 | Across The Universe | Junggigo | R&B |
| 20 | Universe | Reddy | Hip hop |
| 21 | Palette | IU | R&B, Ballad |
| 23 | Dumb Love | Jang Han-byul | Rock |
| 24 | The Collection: Story Op. 2 | Jonghyun | R&B, Ballad |
| 24 | 23 | Hyukoh | Rock |
| 24 | I Wanna? | Snuper | Dance |
| 26 | Saimdang, Memoir of Colors OST | Various | OST |
| 27 | Love & Evil | Loona 1/3 | Synthpop, Ballad |
| 28 | The 20th Anniversary | Sechs Kies | Dance, Ballad |
| 30 | We Effect | Various | Hip hop |
| 30 | Tunnel OST | Various | OST |

==== May ====
| Date | Album | Artist(s) | Genre(s) |
|---|---|---|---|
| 1 | 199X | Triple H | Dance, Hip hop |
| 2 | Wonder If | Junhyung | R&B |
| 2 | Now, We | Lovelyz | Dance, Bubblegum |
| 5 | Your Diary | Han Dong-geun | Ballad |
| 6 | Are You Still Up? | Jin Won | Ballad |
| 8 | One Fine Day | Romeo | Dance |
| 9 | Ms. Perfect OST | Various | OST |
| 10 | Play in Nature Part.1 – Spring | Kim Kyu-jong | Ballad |
| 10 | 4X2=8 | Psy | Dance, Hip hop |
| 12 | Sister's Slam Dunk Season 2 | Unnies | Dance |
| 15 | Signal | Twice | Dance |
| 15 | Shangri-La | VIXX | Dance |
| 15 | The Liar and His Lover OST | Various | OST |
| 15 | The Rebel OST | Various | OST |
| 16 | Blossom | Roy Kim | Ballad |
| 16 | Inhale | ISU (MC the Max) | Ballad |
| 16 | Best Driver | Yozoh | Rock |
| 17 | Duetto | Duetto | Crossover |
| 17 | Like You | Honeyst | Folk |
| 18 | Millionaire Poetry | The Quiett | Hip hop |
| 18 | You're My Love | The East Light | Electronica, Rock |
| 18 | Hyperism Red | Solbi | Dance |
| 18 | Blue Busking OST | Various | OST |
| 22 | Al1 | Seventeen | Dance, Ballad |
| 22 | New Kids: Begin | iKon | Hip hop |
| 23 | Kim Lip | Kim Lip | R&B, Electronic |
| 23 | Foreigner | Dumbfoundead | Hip hop |
| 23 | Cactus | A.C.E | Dance |
| 23 | Hello Hello | B.I.G | Dance |
| 23 | Momentum | MAP6 | Dance |
| 24 | Goodbye For Now | Kyuhyun | Ballad |
| 24 | Gettin Money Moment | Changmo | Hip hop |
| 25 | Gravity | KNK | Ballad |
| 25 | Bleached | Loco | Hip hop |
| 25 | Magical Realism | Be.A | Dance |
| 26 | Hope | iamnot | Rock |
| 27 | Addiction | 24K | Dance, Ballad |
| 29 | Dream Part.01 | Astro | Dance |
| 29 | Calling You | Highlight | R&B, Dance |
| 29 | Mayday | April | Dance |
| 29 | Bittersweet | Baek A-yeon | Ballad, R&B |
| 30 | Team Baby | The Black Skirts | Ballad |
| 30 | Love Is | Rubber Soul | Hip hop |

==== June ====
| Date | Album | Artist(s) | Genre(s) |
|---|---|---|---|
| 1 | We, First | Elris | Dance |
| 2 | Walkin' | Suran | R&B |
| 2 | Chicago Typewriter OST | Various | OST |
| 3 | 35 Boys 5 Concepts | Produce 101 Season 2 | Dance |
| 4 | Wake Up | Top Secret | Dance |
| 5 | Stroke | Gummy | Ballad, R&B |
| 5 | H.A.L.F (Have.A.Little.Fun) | Sik-K | Hip hop |
| 7 | Sunrise | Day6 | Rock, Pop rock |
| 7 | Over 10 Years | F.T. Island | Rock |
| 7 | Happy Moment | Cosmic Girls | Dance, Electronica |
| 7 | Hands on Me | Kim Chung-ha | Dance, Ballad |
| 8 | Kwon Ji Yong | G-Dragon | Hip hop, R&B |
| 11 | Man to Man OST | Various | OST |
| 12 | Ceremony | Pentagon | Dance, Ballad |
| 13 | Be Ordinary | Hwang Chi-yeul | Ballad |
| 14 | What's My Name? | T-ara | Dance, Ballad |
| 14 | Cherry Bomb | NCT 127 | Electronic, Hip hop |
| 15 | You & Yours | Lee Seok-hoon (SG Wannabe) | Ballad |
| 16 | Love Is True | Jeong Jinwoon | Rock |
| 17 | Final | Produce 101 Season 2 | Dance |
| 19 | Muses Diary Part.2: Identity | Nine Muses | Dance |
| 19 | Shine Forever | Monsta X | Hip-hop, Electronic |
| 22 | Purple | Mamamoo | Dance, R&B |
| 26 | Pink Up | Apink | Dance, Ballad |
| 26 | /// | Heize | Hip hop, R&B |
| 26 | JinSoul | JinSoul | Future bass |
| 27 | Stellar Into the World | Stellar | Dance |
| 27 | 90 | Nam Tae-hyun | Rock |
| 28 | Blame | Nakjoon | Ballad, R&B |
| 29 | Stardom | UP10TION | Dance, Ballad |
| 30 | Outside | Crush | R&B |

=== Third quarter ===
==== July ====
| Date | Album | Artist(s) | Genre(s) |
|---|---|---|---|
| 3 | T-With | Kim Tae-woo | Dance, R&B |
| 4 | Black | Lee Hyori | R&B, Dance, Ballad |
| 4 | Give It To Me | Badkiz | Dance, electronic |
| 5 | My Favorite | Favorite | Dance, Ballad |
| 6 | Here I Am | HALO | Dance, Ballad |
| 6 | Take Part.2 | Take | Ballad |
| 9 | The Red Summer | Red Velvet | Dance |
| 10 | Moonlight | MeloMance | Ballad |
| 10 | Fight for My Way OST | Various | OST |
| 11 | One Day | One | Hip hop, R&B |
| 12 | Television | Zico | Hip hop |
| 12 | Suspicious Partner OST | Various | OST |
| 13 | Un2verse | Jessi | Hip hop |
| 13 | Orange Moon | Park Bo-ram | Dance, R&B |
| 13 | Crush On You | Voisper | Ballad, R&B |
| 13 | My Secret Romance OST | Various | OST |
| 14 | Joue avec moi | Lyn | R&B |
| 17 | We are EVE | Eve | Rock |
| 18 | Fireworks | Geeks | Hip-hop |
| 18 | The War | Exo | Dance, R&B |
| 19 | Hola Hola | Kard | Dance |
| 19 | Do Disturb | Jung Yong-hwa | Dance, Ballad |
| 19 | Red | The Koxx | Rock |
| 20 | Gravity, Completed | KNK | Dance, R&B |
| 20 | The Star of Stars | Snuper | Dance |
| 20 | Summer Episode | Akdong Musician | Electronica |
| 20 | Random | Lee Jin-ah | Jazz |
| 20 | The Emperor: Owner of the Mask OST | Various | OST |
| 24 | Boy. | Off On Off | Electronica, R&B |
| 24 | Everywhere | Groovy Room | Hip hop, R&B |
| 25 | Turbo Splash | Turbo | Dance |
| 25 | The Merciless OST | Various | OST |
| 26 | Myteen Go! | Myteen | Dance, R&B |
| 26 | Six Senses | The East Light | Rock, Dance |
| 26 | Puzzle of POP | P.O.P | Dance, Ballad |
| 27 | Prequel | Dreamcatcher | Pop rock, electronic |
| 28 | Hello | Shannon | Ballad, R&B |
| 28 | Be One | Buzz | Rock |
| 28 | Choerry | Choerry | Pop |
| 31 | Verse 2 | JJ Project | R&B, Hip hop |
| 31 | the.the.the | Longguo & Shihyun | Dance, Ballad |
| 31 | Loop | Raina | Dance |

==== August ====
| Date | Album | Artist(s) | Genre(s) |
|---|---|---|---|
| 1 | Parallel | GFriend | Dance, Pop |
| 2 | Sixteen | Samuel | R&B, Dance |
| 2 | The Real: N.Flying | N.Flying | Rock |
| 2 | On/Off | ONF | Dance |
| 3 | Free'sm | CLC | R&B, Dance |
| 3 | Muses Diary Part.3: Love City | Nine Muses | Dance, Ballad |
| 4 | Holiday Night | Girls' Generation | R&B, Dance |
| 4 | Pomade | Drug Restaurant | Rock |
| 4 | Our Twenty For | Winner | Disco, house |
| 4 | Shininryu | Primary | R&B |
| 4 | Hit the Top OST | Various | OST |
| 5 | Show Me the Money 6 Episode 1 | Various | Rap |
| 7 | 1×1=1 (To Be One) | Wanna One | EDM, Ballad |
| 8 | Weme | Weki Meki | Dance, Electronic |
| 9 | Never End | Boyfriend | Dance |
| 9 | My Decade | Jessica Jung | Pop, Ballad |
| 10 | My Sassy Girl OST | Various | OST |
| 12 | Refresh 7th | BP Rania | Dance |
| 12 | Show Me the Money 6 Episode 2 | Various | Rap |
| 13 | The Glen Check Experience | Glen Check | Electronica |
| 16 | White Night | Taeyang | R&B, Electronic |
| 16 | #Drive | DinDin | Hip hop |
| 17 | We Young | NCT Dream | Dance, Bubblegum |
| 18 | Summer Go Loco | Loco | Hip hop |
| 19 | Show Me the Money 6 Episode 3 | Various | Rap |
| 19 | You Are Too Much OST | Various | OST |
| 22 | Gashina^{1} | Sunmi | Synthpop |
| 22 | Freeze! | Momoland | Dance |
| 22 | Love Generation | DIA | Dance, Ballad |
| 22 | The Bride of Habaek OST | Various | OST |
| 23 | Schxxl Out | Pristin | Dance |
| 23 | Identity | Victon | Dance, Ballad |
| 25 | I've Got A Feeling | S.I.S | Dance, Ballad |
| 26 | Colour | Sanchez | Hip hop |
| 26 | Show Me the Money 6 Episode 4 | Various | Rap |
| 28 | Gol-Cha! | Golden Child | Dance |
| 28 | Whisper | VIXX LR | Dance, Hip hop |
| 29 | Following | Hyuna | Dance |
| 29 | Rainbow | Hwang In-sun | Dance, Ballad |
| 30 | All Day Good Day | Good Day | Dance, Ballad |
| 30 | Pop | Primary | R&B |
| 31 | All You Want | IZ | Rock |
| 31 | Part.1 Ever | Jeong Se-woon | R&B |

==== September ====
| Date | Album | Artist(s) | Genre(s) |
|---|---|---|---|
| 1 | 4.0 | 10cm | Folk |
| 1 | Twenty | Yurisangja | Ballad |
| 2 | Show Me the Money 6 Episode 5 | Various | Hip hop |
| 3 | The Blind Star 0.5 | Bewhy | Hip hop |
| 4 | One | Gikwang | R&B |
| 4 | School 2017 OST | Various | OST |
| 5 | Serenity | Shin Hye-sung | Ballad |
| 5 | Blue | B.A.P | Dance, Hip hop |
| 5 | The War: The Power of Music | Exo | Dance, Electronica, R&B |
| 6 | Unmix | MXM | Hip hop, Dance |
| 6 | Demo 01 | Pentagon | Dance, Ballad |
| 7 | Circles | G.Soul | R&B |
| 8 | Uncontrollably Fond OST | Various | OST |
| 11 | Canvas | Junho | R&B, Ballad |
| 13 | Rainbow | GFriend | Pop, Ballad |
| 13 | Color Crush | Elris | Dance |
| 14 | Love and Fall | Bobby (iKon) | Hip hop |
| 14 | Attitude | Yoon Hyun-sang | R&B |
| 16 | Show Me the Money 6 Special | Various | Rap |
| 17 | The Blind Star | Bewhy | Hip hop |
| 17 | Bob Shou Wa | Rocoberry | Rock |
| 18 | Love Yourself 承 'Her' | BTS | Hip hop, Dance |
| 18 | A Taxi Driver OST | Various | OST |
| 19 | The King in Love OST | Various | OST |
| 20 | Eternity | April | Synthpop |
| 21 | Another Light | Sechs Kies | Dance, Hip hop |
| 21 | Mix & Match | Loona Odd Eye Circle | Synthpop |
| 21 | Boycold | Sik-K | Hip hop |
| 22 | A Flower Bookmark 2 | IU | Folk, Ballad |
| 22 | Starry Night '17 | Crucial Star | Hip hop |
| 23 | Strongest Deliveryman OST | Various | OST |
| 25 | Rollin' | B1A4 | Dance |
| 26 | Part.1 Nonfiction | K.Will | Ballad |
| 26 | Hasta la Vista | Royal Pirates | Rock |
| 27 | The Road | Paul Kim | Folk, R&B |
| 28 | Red Diary Page.1 | Bolbbalgan4 | Indie pop, Folk pop |

=== Fourth quarter ===
==== October ====
| Date | Album | Artist(s) | Genre(s) |
|---|---|---|---|
| 3 | The Fortress OST | Various | OST |
| 9 | The Hyena on the Keyboard | Various | OST |
| 10 | W, Here | NU'EST W | Electronica |
| 10 | 7 for 7 | Got7 | Dance, Hip hop, R&B |
| 10 | New Generation | TRCNG | Dance, Ballad |
| 11 | The Girl Next Door | Hash Tag | Dance, Ballad |
| 11 | Hospital Ship OST | Various | OST |
| 11 | Live Up to Your Name OST | Various | OST |
| 12 | Knights of the Sun | SF9 | Dance |
| 12 | U & I, Date | Varsity | Dance |
| 12 | Present | DIA | Dance, Ballad |
| 12 | 2017 Special Photo Edition | UP10TION | Dance |
| 12 | MEiNE | Ha:tfelt | R&B |
| 12 | Sunshine | Rainz | Dance |
| 15 | Life | Jung Dong-ha | Rock |
| 16 | Celebrate | Highlight | Dance, Ballad |
| 16 | Brother Act. | BtoB | Pop, R&B |
| 16 | Move | Taemin (Shinee) | R&B, Electronic |
| 18 | Fantasy | JBJ | Dance, Ballad |
| 18 | Callin' | A.C.E | Dance |
| 18 | The Island Kid | PH-1 | Hip hop |
| 23 | We've Done Something Wonderful | Epik High | Hip hop |
| 23 | Do You Know That Person | Im Chang-jung | Ballad |
| 24 | Remember Me | 4Men | Ballad |
| 25 | Kim Kyung-rok | Kim Kyung-rok | Ballad |
| 26 | Carpe Diem | IN2IT | Dance |
| 27 | No Excuses | Verbal Jint | Hip hop |
| 28 | 20th | NRG | Electronica, R&B |
| 28 | Want You to Say | Playback | Dance |
| 30 | Analog Melody | Monni | Rock |
| 30 | Twicetagram | Twice | Dance, Bubblegum |
| 31 | Ordinary Things | Juniel | Pop rock, Ballad |
| 31 | Max & Match | Loona Odd Eye Circle | Synthpop |

==== November ====
| Date | Album | Artist(s) | Genre(s) |
|---|---|---|---|
| 1 | Dream Part.02 | Astro | Dance, Ballad |
| 1 | Leaving Seoul | J.Lee, Netherlands Tulip Farm | Folk, Ballad |
| 2 | Anxiety | Woo Won-jae | Hip hop |
| 2 | The Moment of Memory | Hyeongseop X Euiwoong | Hip hop, Ballad |
| 3 | Dear | Mind U | Ballad |
| 4 | Bad Thief, Good Thief OST | Various | OST |
| 5 | Leaves | Byul | Ballad |
| 6 | Teen, Age | Seventeen | Dance, Hip hop |
| 6 | Play | Super Junior | Dance, Electronic |
| 7 | The Code | Monsta X | Hip-hop, Electronic |
| 7 | Full Moon | EXID | R&B, Electropop |
| 7 | Montage | Block B | Dance, Ballad |
| 8 | Act. 3 Chococo Factory | Gugudan | Dance, Ballad |
| 8 | The Fillette | Kim So-hee | Dance, R&B |
| 9 | From. Viction | Victon | Dance, Ballad |
| 9 | Rewind | Hwang Chi-yeul | Ballad |
| 13 | 1-1=0 (Nothing Without You) | Wanna One | Dance, Ballad |
| 14 | Fall in Lovelyz | Lovelyz | Synthpop |
| 14 | Trace of Emotion | Kim Dong-wan | Ballad |
| 15 | Your Season | Fly to the Sky | Ballad |
| 15 | Cloudy | Kiggen | Hip-hop |
| 15 | Stranger | Guckkasten | Rock |
| 16 | Eye Candy | Samuel | Dance, R&B |
| 16 | Expand | ALi | Ballad, R&B |
| 16 | While You Were Sleeping OST | Various | OST |
| 17 | Perfect Velvet | Red Velvet | Pop, R&B |
| 17 | Dear | Snuper | Synthpop |
| 17 | The Package OST | Various | OST |
| 20 | Temperature of Love OST | Various | OST |
| 20 | Confession Couple OST | Various | OST |
| 21 | You & Me | Kard | Dance, Hip hop |
| 22 | Demo 02 | Pentagon | Dance, Ballad |
| 22 | Someone to Love | Honeyst | Folk |
| 23 | Romance | Yoo Seung-woo | Ballad |
| 27 | My 20's | Jun. K | R&B |
| 27 | Dream On | Busters | Dance |
| 28 | Yves | Yves | R&B, Electropop |
| 28 | Because This Is My First Life OST | Various | OST |
| 29 | Emptiness in Memory | Naul | R&B |

==== December ====
| Date | Album | Artist(s) | Genre(s) |
|---|---|---|---|
| 1 | My Life 愛 | Rain | Dance, Ballad |
| 1 | Dramatic | Standing Egg | Ballad |
| 1 | Winter | The Barberettes | Ballad |
| 4 | Broken People | Han Dong-geun | Ballad |
| 4 | Meloholic OST | Various | OST |
| 6 | Moonrise | Day6 | Rock, Pop rock |
| 6 | The First | The Boyz | Dance, Ballad |
| 7 | Her | DPR Live | Hip hop |
| 7 | Trace of Emotion: Blue | Kim Dong-wan | Ballad |
| 10 | Move-ing | Taemin | Dance, R&B |
| 11 | Merry & Happy | Twice | Dance, Pop, Christmas |
| 12 | This Christmas: Winter Is Coming | Taeyeon | Ballad, Christmas |
| 12 | Apartment | Car, the garden | Rock |
| 13 | Re:Born | Soyou | Ballad, R&B |
| 13 | Ego | B.A.P | Dance |
| 13 | The Cloud Dream of the Nine – The 2nd Dream | Uhm Jung-hwa | Dance |
| 14 | Prophet | Microdot | Hip hop |
| 15 | Kim Tae Woo With Friends | Kim Tae-woo | R&B |
| 15 | The Idolmaster KR OST | Various | OST |
| 20 | Graduation | Giriboy | Hip-hop |
| 22 | Gloria | Naul | R&B |
| 23 | Andante OST | Various | OST |
| 26 | Universe | Exo | Ballad, R&B |
| 27 | RescuE | Younha | Ballad, R&B |
| 28 | Chuu | Chuu | Pop |
| 29 | Inside | Yang Da-il | R&B |

== Deaths ==
- Jonghyun (aged 27), singer and songwriter (Shinee/SM the Ballad)

== See also ==
- 2017 in South Korea
- List of South Korean films of 2017
- List of Gaon Album Chart number ones of 2017
- List of Gaon Digital Chart number ones of 2017

== Notes ==
- ^{1}The following was released as a single but charted on the Gaon Album Chart.
