= 1Punch =

South Korean musical duo

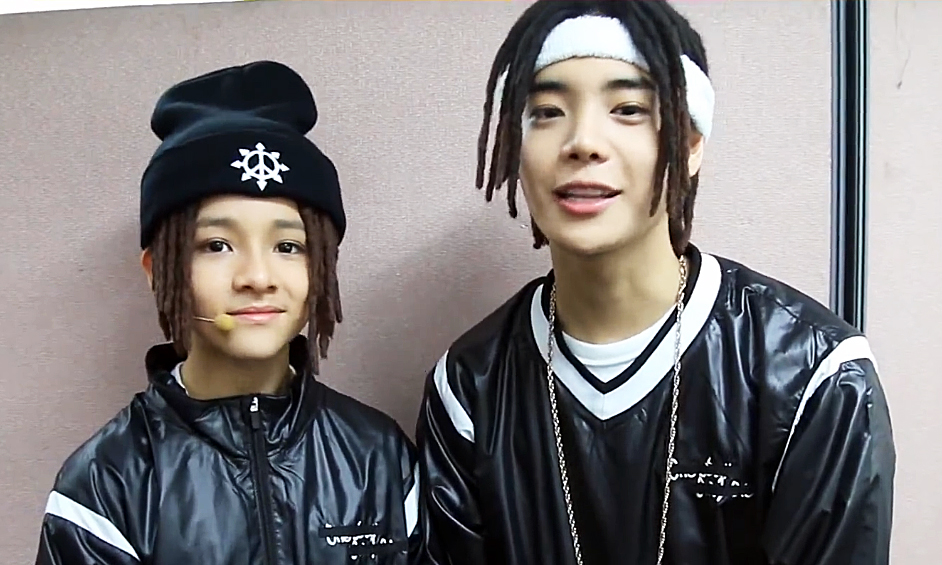
- 1Punch in 2015

Background information
- Origin: Seoul, South Korea
- Genres: Hip hop
- Years active: 2015
- Labels: Brave Entertainment; D-Business Entertainment
- Past members: One; Punch
- Website: www.bravesound.com

1Punch (Korean: 원펀치) was a South Korean duo formed by Brave Entertainment in Seoul, South Korea, consisting of One and Punch (now known as Samuel). They debuted on January 23, 2015, with their single "Turn Me Back" (돌려놔) from the single album The Anthem. The duo ultimately disbanded after One signed with YG Entertainment. Both members debuted as solo artists in 2017.

== Discography ==
=== Single albums ===
Title	Album details	Peak chart positions	Sales
Title	Album details	KOR	Sales
The Anthem	Released: January 23, 2015; Label: Brave Entertainment, D-Business Entertainment, LOEN Entertainment; Formats: CD, digital download	17	KOR: 407

=== Singles ===
Title	Year	Album
As lead artist
"Turn Me Back"	2015	The Anthem
