= One (rapper) =

South Korean actor and musician (born 1994)

- Born: Jung Jae-won; March 29, 1994 (age 32); Seoul, South Korea
- Occupations: Rapper; singer; songwriter; actor
- Musical career
- Genres: R&B; hip hop; K-pop
- Instrument: Vocals
- Years active: 2015–present
- Labels: D-Business; YG; Private Only
- Formerly of: 1Punch; YG Family

Korean name
- Hangul: 정제원
- RR: Jeong Jewon
- MR: Chŏng Chewŏn

Jung Jae-won (Korean: 정제원; born March 29, 1994), better known by stage name One (원; stylized as ONE), is a South Korean rapper, singer-songwriter, and actor. He debuted in 2015 as a member of the former hip-hop duo 1Punch with Kim Samuel. The following year he moved to YG Entertainment from D-Business Entertainment. In 2019, Jaewon left YG Entertainment and since moved under his own record label Private Only. He is well known for appearing on the fourth and fifth season of Show Me the Money, as well as appearances on dramas such as A Korean Odyssey (2017), Room No. 9 (2018), and Her Private Life (2019).

== Biography ==
=== Early life ===
Jung Jae-won was born on March 29, 1994, in Seoul, South Korea. During his adolescent years, Jae-won dreamed of becoming a film director. He's namely mentioned liking Quentin Tarantino films as an inspiration.

=== 2015–2016: 1Punch, Show Me the Money and move to YGE ===
One began his career as part of the hip hop duo 1Punch with Samuel under a collaboration between the labels D-Business Entertainment and Brave Entertainment on January 23, 2015. They debuted with the album The Anthem with lead single "Turn Me Back". On September 21, YGE had scouted and signed an exclusive contract with One, following his appearance in the fourth series of Show Me the Money. He was a member of "Team Zipal" under producers Zico and Paloalto until his elimination in the sixth episode. In the following year, he returned and participated in the fifth series of the show. This time, as a member of Team AOMG under producers Simon D and Gray, overall placing tenth in the season. Through the show, the single "Comfortable", a collaborative track with Simon D, Gray and himself achieved a perfect all kill, topping all South Korean charts at the time.

In March 2016, One made an appearance on labelmate Lee Hi's "My Star" music video as her counterpart. He also made a short appearance in the music video of labelmate MOBB's "Hit Me" in September of the same year.

=== 2017–present: One Day, acting debut, departure from YG Entertainment and debut album ===
One made his debut as a solo artist under YGE following single album One Day on July 11, 2017, with self-written and produced lead singles "Gettin' By" and "Heyahe. It was also reported that he became the first male solo artist to debut from the label in 14 years since Seven's debut in 2003, excluding Kang Seung-yoon who debuted as a solo artist in 2013 but later debuted in Winner. From July 15 to 21, a pop-up store for One titled "One Day One Week" Magazine Shop was unveiled, displaying his album, debut films and exclusive materials. On July 21, One held his first fansign for single album "One Day" at Luft Cafe.

In October, YG Entertainment announced that One would start his acting career with a supporting role in tvN's drama A Korean Odyssey that was aired in December. In November, One was cast in a romantic one-act drama Anthology together with Shin Eun-soo. He played a smart and good looking country boy with a hidden secret.

In February, it was confirmed that One and Soyou were to join Channel A's Heart Signal season 2 as new panelists. In July 2018, One was confirmed to make his big screen debut with the romance film Goodbye Summer alongside Kim Bo-ra where his character was a high-school student who is terminally ill. In August, he was cast in the tvN drama Room No. 9. The same year, he was cast in the historical drama Arthdal Chronicles as the younger version of Jang Dong-gun's character. In 2019, he was cast in the tvN drama Her Private Life as the popular visual member of fictional idol group White Ocean.

On July 17, 2019, One revealed following the end of his contract with YGE, he decided to part ways and establish a one-man agency for his future activities. One released his first studio album, PRVT01, on November 11.

== Discography ==
=== Studio albums ===
Title	Album details	Peak positions	Sales
Title	Album details	KOR	Sales
PRVT 01	Released: November 11, 2019; Label: Private Only; Formats: CD, digital download; Track listing: 1. "Hard to Love"; 2. "Nineteen"; 3. "You Love It"; 4. "Victoria"; 5. "GZB"; 6. "What a Night"; 7. "Instinct"; 8. "Night Time Ride"; 9. "Angel"; 10. "Who"; 11. "I Don't Know Anything"; 12. "Soljik"; 13. "Alive"; 14. "Swift"; 15. "Stone"; 16. "Last Cigarette"	44	KOR: 1,442

=== Single albums ===
Title	Album details	Peak positions		Sales
Title	Album details	KOR	TW	Sales
One Day	Released: July 11, 2017; Label: YG Entertainment; Formats: CD, digital download	6	15	KOR: 8,551

=== Singles ===
List of singles, with selected chart positions, showing year released, sales and album name
Title	Year	Peak position	Sales	Album
Title	Year	KOR	Sales	Album
"Gettin' by" (그냥 그래)	2017	—	KOR: 34,949	One Day
"Heyahe" (해야해)	2017	—	KOR: 20,880	One Day
"Hard To Love"	2019	—	—N/a	PRVT 01
"—" denotes releases that did not chart.

=== Other releases ===
List of other releases, with selected chart positions, showing year released, sales and album name
Title	Year	Peak positions	Sales	Album
Title	Year	KOR	Sales	Album
As featured artist
"Blossom 2010" (Dustyy Han featuring One)	2019	—	—N/a	7 Dustyy'2
"Star" (Simahoy featuring One)	2019	—	—N/a	Pop Talk
Collaborations
"Peep" (힐끔힐끔) (with Dok2 and The Quiett)	2015	—	—N/a	#Jeilx
"Next Level" (with Hanhae, Geegooin, and P-Type)	2015	—	—N/a	Show Me the Money 4
"I'm Not The Person You Used To Know" (니가 알던 내가 아냐) (with Simon Dominic, G2, and BewhY)	2016	2	KOR: 751,667	Show Me the Money 5
"Comfortable" (맘 편히) (with Simon Dominic and Gray)	2016	1	KOR: 750,349	Show Me the Money 5
"—" denotes releases that did not chart.

== Videography ==
=== Music videos ===
Year	Title	Director(s)
2017	"해야해 (Heyahe)"	VM Project Architecture
2017	"그냥 그래 (Gettin' by)"	—N/a
2019	"Hard to Love"	Lonewolf
2019	"Stone"	Lonewolf

== Filmography ==
=== Film ===
Year	Title	Role	Notes
2019	Goodbye Summer	Hyun Jae	Lead role

=== Television series ===
Year	Title	Role	Network	Notes
2017	A Korean Odyssey	Hong Hae-ah	tvN	Supporting role
2018	Drama Stage: "Anthology"	Song Jin-hyun	tvN	Lead role (One-act Drama)
2018	Room No. 9	Ki Chan-sung	tvN	Supporting role
2019	Her Private Life	Cha Si-an	tvN	Main Cast
2019	Arthdal Chronicles	Ta Gon (young)	tvN	Supporting role

=== Variety show ===
Year	Network	Title	Notes
2015	Mnet	Show Me the Money 4	Contestant
2016	Mnet	Show Me the Money 5	Contestant
2018	Channel A	Heart Signal	Panelist (season 2)
2020	JTBC	The Romance	Cast

=== Web dramas ===
Year	Title	Network	Role
2019	Ghost Vros (고스트 브로스)	tvN D STORY	Jin Sung-jae
