= Varsity (group) =

South Korean boy band

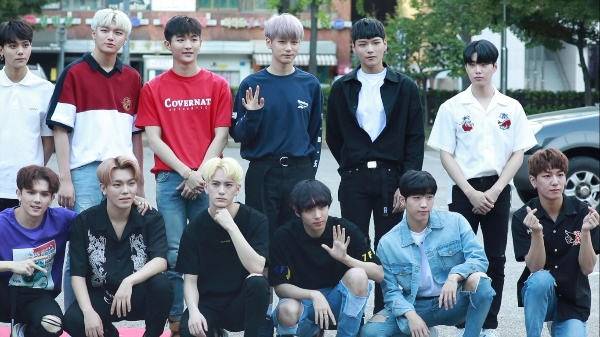
- Varsity in August 2018

Background information
- Origin: Seoul, South Korea
- Genres: K-pop
- Years active: 2017–2020
- Labels: CSO, Jungle
- Spinoffs: VARSITY V
- Past members: Kid; Riho; Seungbo; Yunho; Junwoo; Xiweol; Dawon; Damon; Xin; Jaebin; Anthony; Manny
- Website: http://csoent.com

Varsity (Korean: 바시티) is a South Korean boy band formed by CSO Entertainment in 2017. They later signed with Jungle Entertainment. They debuted on January 5, 2017, with "U R My Only One".

== Members ==
=== Former ===
- Kid (키드) — Leader
- Riho (리호)
- Seungbo (승보)
- Yunho (윤호)
- Junwoo (준우)
- Damon (데이먼)
- Xiweol (시월)
- Xin (씬)
- Jaebin (재빈)
- Anthony (앤써니)
- Dawon (다원)
- Manny (만니)

== Discography ==
=== Extended plays ===
Title	Album details	Peak chart positions	Sales
Title	Album details	KOR	Sales
U & I, Date	Released: October 12, 2017; Label: CSO Entertainment, Jungle Entertainment; Formats: CD, digital download; Track listing: 1. "Varsity"; 2. "U R My Only One"; 3. "Can You Come Out Now? (지금 나올래)"; 4. "Fly"; 5. "Rollin"; 6. "Hole In One"	32	KOR: 1,321

=== Singles ===
Title	Year	Album
"U R My Only One"	2017	U & I, Date
"Hole In One"	2017	U & I, Date
"Can You Come Out Now?" (지금 나올래)	2017	U & I, Date
"Flower (Flos Clarissimus)"	2018	Non-album singles
"We'll Meet Again"	2020	Non-album singles
