= Samuel (singer) =

American singer (born 2002)

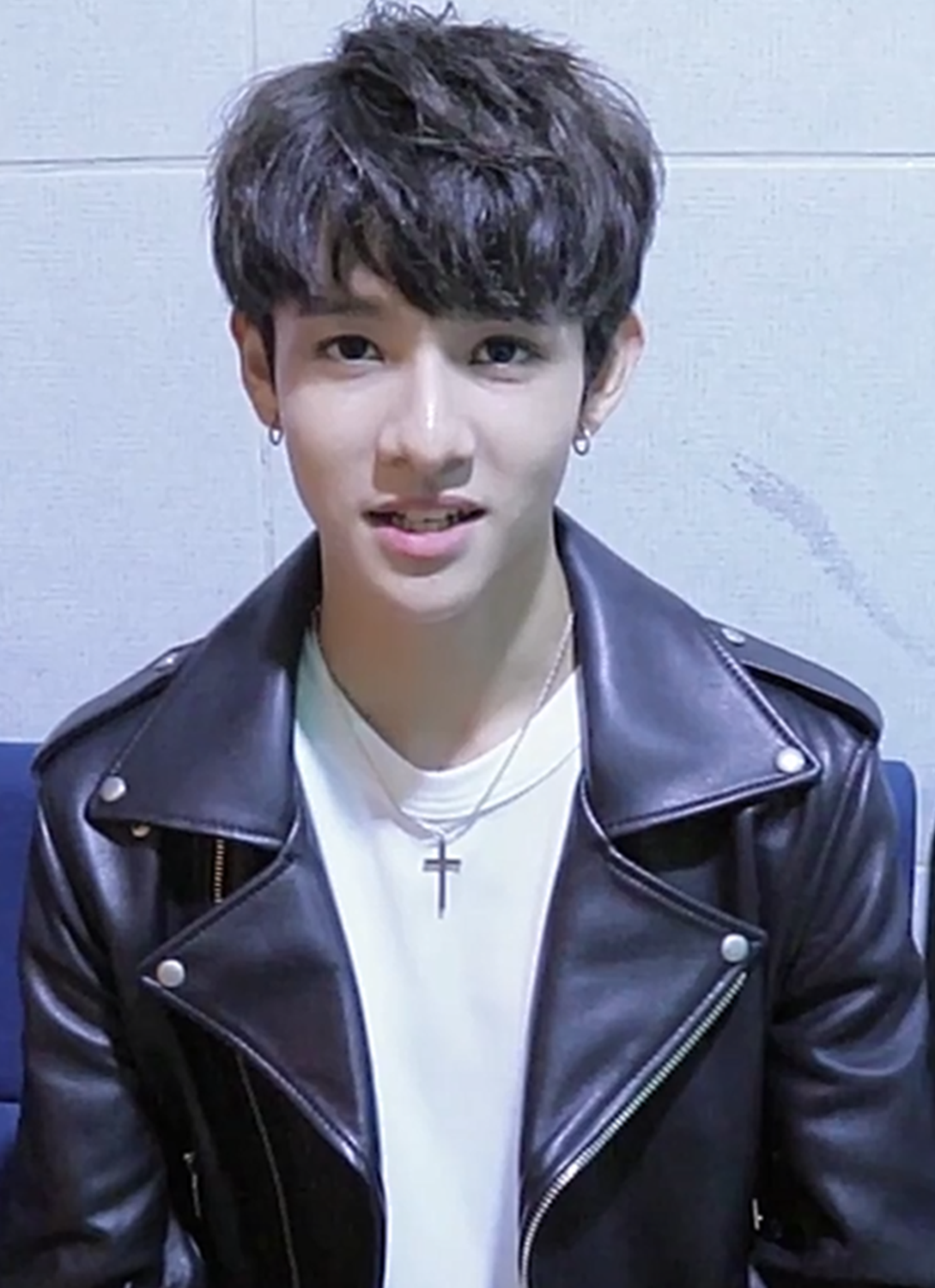
- Samuel in 2017
- Born: Samuel Kim Arredondo; January 17, 2002 (age 24); Los Angeles, California, U.S.
- Occupation: Singer
- Years active: 2015–present
- Musical career
- Genres: K-pop; R&B; Hip hop
- Instrument: Vocals
- Labels: Samuel Management & Entertainment Music Group; Pony Canyon
- Formerly of: 1Punch

Samuel Kim Arredondo (Korean: 사무엘 김 아레돈도; born January 17, 2002), better known by his stage name Samuel (Korean: 사무엘), is an American singer based in South Korea. He was a part of the short-lived hip hop duo 1Punch in 2015. He participated in the reality television series season 2 of Produce 101 during the first half of 2017. In the final episode, he ranked 18th and was not able to join the show's project group. One month after the show ended, he began his solo career, with the release of his debut extended play (EP) Sixteen on August 2, 2017.

== Early life ==
Samuel Kim Arredondo was born in Los Angeles, California, to a Mexican father (José Arredondo) and a South Korean mother.

== Career ==
=== 2012–2014: Pre-debut ===
Samuel made his first appearances to the public at the age of eleven, when he appeared in the live broadcast series Seventeen TV as a trainee under Pledis Entertainment. In 2013, he left the agency.

Samuel met producer Brave Brothers and subsequently began training at Brave Entertainment. He signed an exclusive contract with the company on June 9, 2014.

=== 2015–2016: 1Punch and collaboration with Silentó ===
In 2015, Samuel debuted as a part of hip-hop duo named 1Punch (with rapper One) under a collaboration between Brave Entertainment and D-Business Entertainment, taking "Punch" as his stage name. They debuted on January 23 with the release of "Turn Me Back", which is the title track of their album, The Anthem. Eight months later, One was scouted by YG Entertainment, leading to the disbandment of the duo. Under the name, Punch, Samuel collaborated with Silentó to release the single "Spotlight" in 2016, for which they won the 26th Seoul Music Award for Global Collaboration. He later joined Silentó on tour in the US.

=== 2017–2021: Produce 101, solo debut and lawsuit ===
In April 2017, Samuel participated in the second season of the popular survival show Produce 101 under his own name, representing Brave Entertainment. During the first elimination, he was ranked 2nd, but did not make the final cut for the 11-member team, finally ranking 18th overall. The result was met with surprise from many viewers, who had expected Samuel to become part of the lineup of Wanna One.

Samuel debuted as a solo artist on August 2. His debut mini album, Sixteen, was released on August 2, with the title track "Sixteen" featuring rapper Changmo.

Samuel's first full-length album, Eye Candy, was released on November 16, 2017, with a total of ten tracks including the lead single "Candy".

In December 2017, it was announced that Samuel had signed a contract with 'Pony Canyon' for his Japanese promotions.

Samuel officially debuted in Japan on February 7, 2018, with his first Japanese single, "Sixteen (Japanese Ver.)". The music video of "Sixteen (Japanese Ver.)" was released on January 18.

In March 2018, Samuel released his second mini album, One, with the title track "One" featuring BtoB member Jung Il-hoon.

In April 2018, Samuel released his second Japanese single, "Candy (Japanese Ver.)", on May 16. The music video of the track was released on May 2.

On May 30, 2018, Samuel released his repackaged album, Teenager, featuring Lee Ro Han, who was a runner-up to MNet's "School Rapper Season 2".

In the course of 2018, Samuel, together with Chinese singer Zhou Zhennan, collaborated and participated in Tencent's The Collaboration Season 2. The duo eventually placed first and won the competition.

In June 2019, Samuel announced to work independently onwards, filed a name trademark, and set-up a one-man agency.

On November 17, 2021, Samuel won a lawsuit against Brave Entertainment to terminate his contract.

=== 2024–present: Now ===
On April 21, 2024, Samuel made his comeback after five years and released his new self-produced EP Now, along with its lead single titled "YEH YEH!".

In May 2025, Samuel participated on Mingyu's solo track "Shake It Off", included on Seventeen's fifth studio album, Happy Burstday.

On May 9, 2025, he released the digital single "Rockstar".

On June 8, 2026, released a four track EP entitled, SAMUELiTO. The lead single is "Zigi-Zigi-Zigi".

== Personal life ==
On July 16, 2019, Samuel's father José Arredondo was found dead at his condo in Cabo San Lucas, Mexico. He died from blunt force trauma and stab wounds. Later in July 2019, Mexican authorities arrested a suspect who was a family acquaintance and "friend of [Arredondo] for 20 years".

== Discography ==
=== Studio albums ===
Title	Details	Peak chart positions	Sales
Title	Details	KOR	Sales
Eye Candy	Released: November 16, 2017; Label: Brave, Kakao; Formats: CD, digital download; Track listing: 1. Candy (캔디); 2. Never Let U Down; 3. Love Love Love; 4. Paradise; 5. Crush On You (끌려); 6. Stunning (찬란하게); 7. Jewel Box (보석함); 8. Masquerade (가면놀이) (feat. Maboos); 9. Dream; 10. Sixteen (식스틴) (feat. Changmo) (Remix)	6	KOR: 25,153

=== Extended plays ===
Title	Details	Peak chart positions	Sales
Title	Details	KOR	Sales
Sixteen	Released: August 2, 2017; Label: Brave, Kakao; Formats: CD, digital download; Track listing: 1. Jewel Box (보석함); 2. Sixteen (식스틴) (feat. Changmo); 3. I Got It; 4. With U (feat. Kim Chung-ha); 5. 123 (One Two Three) (feat. Maboos); 6. I'm Ready	4	KOR: 34,386
One	Released: March 28, 2018; Label: Brave, Kakao; Formats: CD, digital download; Track listing: 1. One (feat. Jung Il-hoon of BTOB); 2. SOS; 3. Princess; 4. I Can't Sleep; 5. Clap Your Hands; 6. Just a While (잠시만)	8	KOR: 16,900
One	Re-released: May 30, 2018 (Teenager); Label: Brave, Kakao; Formats: CD, digital download; Track listing: 1. Teenager (틴에이저) (feat. Lee Ro Han); 2. Kka Kka (까까) (feat. Maboos); 3. One (feat. Jung Il-hoon of BTOB); 4. SOS; 5. Princess; 6. I Can't Sleep; 7. Clap Your Hands; 8. Just a While (잠시만)	11	KOR: 16,900

=== Singles ===
Title	Year	Peak chart positions		Sales	Album
Title	Year	KOR	JPN	Sales	Album
Korean
"Spotlight" (with Silentó)	2016	—	—N/a	—N/a	Non-album single
"Sixteen" (식스틴) (feat. Changmo)	2017	88	—N/a	KOR: 22,655	Sixteen
"Candy" (캔디)	2017	—	—N/a	—N/a	Eye Candy
"Winter Night" (겨울밤)	2018	—	—N/a	—N/a	Non-album single
"One" (feat. Jung Il-hoon of BtoB)	2018	—	—N/a	—N/a	One
"Teenager" (틴에이저) (feat. Lee Ro Han)	2018	—	—N/a	—N/a	Teenager
"Archive People" (with Brave Hongcha)	2019	—	—N/a	—N/a	Non-album single
"Yeh! Yeh! "	2024	—	—N/a	—N/a	Now
"Wanna Hear You Say" (feat. Hoàng Mỹ An)	2025	—	—N/a	—N/a	Non-album singles
"Rockstar"	2025	—	—N/a	—N/a	Non-album singles
"Zigi Zigi Zigi"	2026	—	—N/a	—N/a	Samuelito
Japanese
"Sixteen"	2018	—N/a	19	JPN: 3,020	Non-album singles
"Candy"	2018	—N/a	30	JPN: 1,563	Non-album singles
"One"	2019	—N/a	52	—N/a	Non-album singles
"—" denotes songs that did not chart or were not released in that region.

=== Soundtracks ===
Title	Year	Album	Collab	Ref.
Say you love me (좋아한다 말해)	2017	Pink Pink OST	Kriesha Chu	
Thousand Times	2018	Cross OST	N/A	
Time to Shine	2018	Sweet Revenge 2 OST	BIGSTAR Feeldog	

=== Other appearances ===
Title	Year	Album	Collab	Ref.
"CHANEL BAG" (샤넬백)	2016	SUNGLASSES	ELECTROBOYZ	
"Chan Chan Chan" (찬찬찬)	2019	Immortal Songs: Singing the Legend (Sing the Lyrics of Kim Byeong Geol)	Hong Kyung-min	

== Filmography ==
=== Reality shows ===
Year	Title	Notes
2012	Made in U	Contestant
2017	Produce 101 Season 2	Contestant
2017	Leaving The Nest 2	Cast member
2017	Photo People	Cast member
2018	The Collaboration Season 2	Contestant

=== Television series ===
Year	Title	Role	Notes
2018	Sweet Revenge 2	Seo Robin	Main Cast
2018	Pops in Seoul	Host	

=== Radio shows ===
Year	Title	Network	Role	Notes	Ref.
2022–present	Radio'n Us	Arirang Radio	DJ	March 14, 2022–present	

== Awards and nominations ==
Year	Award	Category	Nominated Work	Result
2017	26th Seoul Music Awards	Global Collaboration Award	"Spotlight" with Silentó	Won
2017	19th Mnet Asian Music Awards	Best New Male Artist	Kim Samuel	Nominated
2017	19th Mnet Asian Music Awards	Artist of the Year	Kim Samuel	Nominated
2017	Yahoo! Asia Buzz Awards	Most Searched KR New Singer	Kim Samuel	Won
2018	32nd Golden Disk Awards	New Artist of the Year	Kim Samuel	Nominated
2018	32nd Golden Disk Awards	Global Popularity Award	Kim Samuel	Nominated
2018	27th Seoul Music Awards	Bonsang Award	Kim Samuel	Nominated
2018	27th Seoul Music Awards	Popularity Award	Kim Samuel	Nominated
2018	27th Seoul Music Awards	Hallyu Special Award	Kim Samuel	Nominated
2018	Soribada Best K-Music Awards	New Hallyu Performance Award	Kim Samuel	Won
