= Skye (group) =

South Korean boy band

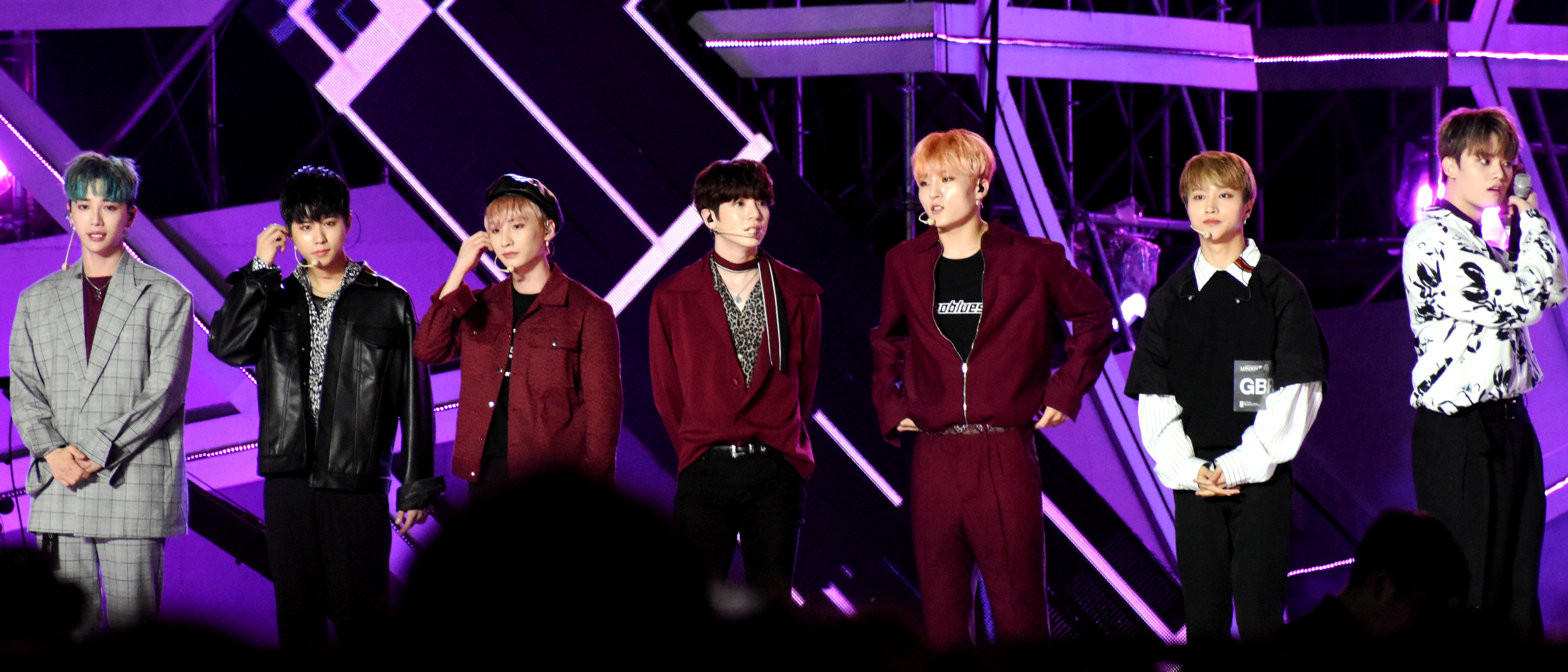
- Skye at the 2018 Incheon Airport Sky Festival

Background information
- Also known as: IN2IT (2017–2023)
- Origin: Seoul, South Korea
- Genre: K-pop
- Years active: 2017–2025
- Labels: MMO; Stone; First
- Spinoffs: CoA
- Past members: Jinsub; Sunghyun; Jiahn; Yeontae; Inho; Hyunuk; Isaac; Inpyo

Skye (Korean: 스카이) was a South Korean boy band formed through Mnet's 2016 survival show Boys24. The group consisted of Yoo Ji-ahn, Jung Yeon-tae, Hwang In-ho, Han Hyun-uk, Lee In-pyo, and Isaac Voo. Skye was originally an eight-piece ensemble; Jinsub departed from the group in March 2018, while Sunghyun departed on September 4, 2019. On November 25, 2025, they announced the conclusion of their group activities, and their final fan meeting was held on December 28, 2025.

The group originally debuted on October 26, 2017 as IN2IT, under the management of MMO with their first extended play (EP) Carpe Diem. They went on to release three more single albums: Snapshot (2018), Into The Night Fever (2018), and Puzzle (2019) prior to their contract expiration with the label in January 2020, when they became an independent group. In May 2023, the group announced that they were rebranding under the new name Skye.

== Name ==
The group name, In2It, gives the direct meaning "Intuit" as well the phrase "In to it", which together means that "the boys will make fans fall into their intuitive charms".

== History ==
=== 2017–2019: Formation and debut ===
All of the members of In2It came from the pre-debut program Boys24, the contestants of which made a total of 260 concert performances during their one year and six month Mesa Hall Concert performance and training period from early 2016 to late 2017. In early 2016, a total of 5,500 applicants auditioned for Boys24, from which less than thirty people were selected as Boys24 members. Only eight members were selected to debut in the final group, In2It.

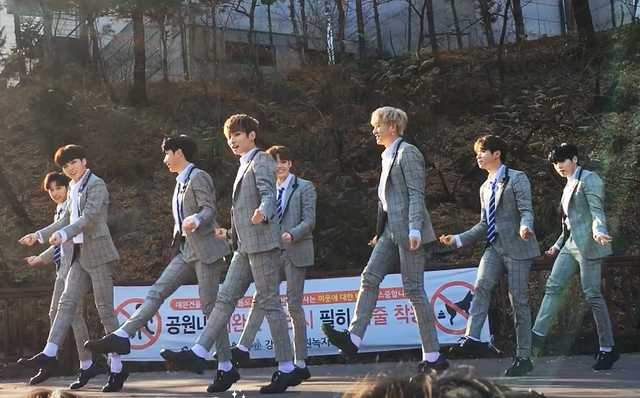
In2It in 2017

In2It debuted with their EP Carpe Diem, which signifies the shift from 'boy' to 'man'. The mini album, released on October 26, 2017, consists of songs from composers Duble Sidekick, Cha Cha Malone, and Paul Rein. The lead single, "Amazing", is a dance-pop song with chill trap sounds and a tropical beat. The music video for the lead single "Amazing" was filmed in Kolsai Lake National Park, Kazakhstan, on September 13, 2017.

In2It made their debut on M Countdown on October 26, 2017, with the song "Amazing" from the EP Carpe Diem; on November 9, the song charted fifth place on the M Countdown Chart. In2It held a Japanese showcase, named In2It showcase "Carpe Diem" in Japan, from December 3 to 10, 2017. In2It held four concerts, together called "In2It Winter Paradise", in South Korea on December 24 and 25, 2017. In2It attended the 2018 Taipei High City New Year's Eve Countdown Party on December 31, 2017. The group then held its first Asia Tour in Singapore, Malaysia, and Indonesia on February 2, February 4, and February 10, 2018.

On March 26, 2018, MMO Entertainment announced that Kim Ri-ho would not be continuing with the group as he had been suffering from Ménière's disease.

On April 19, 2018, In2It made their comeback with a single album titled SnapShot. In2It performed the lead song "Snapshot" as well as "Be Bop Baby" at KCON Japan on April 15, 2018, ahead of their comeback. They also performed at "Power of K Live" in Japan on April 30, and at "Dream Concert" held in the Seoul World Cup Stadium on May 12, 2018.

In2It released their second single album, Into The Night Fever, on July 26, 2018. The album features three songs: "Sorry For My English", "Geronimo", and "It's U". In2It performed at the Korea Music Festival held in Sky Gocheok Stadium on August 1, 2018. The group performed at KCON once more, this time at KCON LA on August 11, 2018.

On September 4, 2019, it was announced that Sunghyun would leave the group due to personal reasons. The group, now as six members, released its third single album Puzzle on November 14, 2019, and promoted it on Music Bank and other weekly music shows.

=== 2020–2022: Departure from MMO and military service ===
After discussions with both the members and their agency, the group's contract was terminated on January 31, 2020, and the group would move forward independently.

Due to COVID-19, the Korean members decided to fulfill their mandatory military service together while their foreign member, Isaac, stayed in his home country of Malaysia. Their leader, Inpyo, returned from the military on May 8, 2022, right after finishing his last performance for the military musical "A Song Of Meissa", where he participated alongside fellow In2It member Hyunuk and EXO's Chanyeol.

Jiahn, Inpyo, and Hyunuk held an online and offline fanmeeting while Isaac was still in Malaysia, preparing for his solo debut after signing a solo contract with Prodigee Asia. Yeontae finished his military service in August 2022, while Inho finished his in September 2022.

=== 2023–2025: Reformations as Skye and Disbandment ===
On March 16, 2023, it was announced that In2It would be rebranding under a new group name, Skye.

Despite the rebrand, they announced the conclusion of their group activities in November 25, 2025, and their final fan meeting was held on December 28, 2025.

== Former members ==
- Yoo Ji-ahn (유지안)
- Jeong Yeon-tae (정연태)
- Hwang In-ho (황인호)
- Han Hyun-uk (한현욱)
- Isaac Voo (아이젝, 邬凯名/鄔凱名)
- Lee In-pyo (이인표)
- Kim Ri-ho (김리호)
- Kim Sung-hyun (김성현)

== Discography ==
=== Extended plays ===
Title	Album details	Peak chart positions	Sales
Title	Album details	KOR	Sales
Carpe Diem	Released: October 26, 2017; Label: MMO Entertainment; Formats: CD, digital download; Track listing: 1. Paradise; 2. Amazing; 3. Cadillac; 4. Rising Star; 5. Tomorrow	6	KOR: 31,784

=== Single albums ===
Title	Album details	Peak chart positions	Sales
Title	Album details	KOR	Sales
SnapShot	Released: April 19, 2018; Label: MMO Entertainment; Formats: CD, digital download; Track listing: 1. Snapshot; 2. 2U; 3. Be Bop Baby; 4. SnapShot (Inst.); 5. 2U (Inst.); 6. Be Bop Baby (Inst.)	9	KOR: 10,032
Into the Night Fever	Released: July 26, 2018; Label: MMO Entertainment; Formats: CD, digital download; Track listing: 1. It's U 2. Sorry For My English; 3. Geronimo; 4. It's U (Inst.); 5. Sorry For My English (Inst.); 6. Geronimo (Inst.)	14	KOR: 8,459
Puzzle	Released: November 14, 2019; Label: MMO Entertainment; Formats: CD, digital download; Track listing: 1. ULlala: Poisoning; 2. Young & Dumb; 3. If It's a Dream (꿈이라면 만약)	43	KOR: 1,780

=== Singles ===
Title	Year	Peak chart positions		Album
Title	Year	KOR	JPN	Album
In2It
Korean
"Amazing"	2017	—	—N/a	Carpe Diem
"SnapShot"	2018	—	—N/a	Snapshot
"Sorry for My English"	2018	—	—N/a	Into the Night Fever
"Run Away"	2019	—	—N/a	Non-album single
"ULlala: Poisoning"	2019	—	—N/a	Puzzle
"Be The Future" (with Dreamcatcher & AleXa) (As Millenasia Project)	2020	—	—N/a	Non-album single
Japanese
"I'm Your Joker"	2020	—	19	Non-album single
"Fire In My Heart"	2020	—	—	Non-album single
CoA (sub-unit)
"A New Beginning" (Japanese)	2023	—	—	Non-album single
"—" denotes releases that did not chart.

=== Soundtrack appearances ===
Year	Song	Television series	Ref.
2017	"My Way" (sung by Jeong Yeon-tae)	Revolutionary Love	
2019	"Snapshot"	Her Private Life	

== Concerts and tours ==
=== Asia Showcase Tour ===
Date	City	Country	Title	Venue
February 2, 2018	Singapore	Singapore	In2It Asia Showcase "Carpe Diem" in Singapore	SOTA
February 4, 2018	Kuala Lumpur	Malaysia	In2It Asia Showcase "Carpe Diem" in Malaysia	PJ Live Art
February 10, 2018	Jakarta	Indonesia	In2It Asia Showcase "Carpe Diem" in Indonesia	The Kasablanka

=== IN2IT X ION Tour ===
Date	City	Country	Title	Venue
April 15, 2019	Mumbai	India	In2it First Tour In India "IN2IT X ION"	Ravindra Natya Mandir
April 19, 2019	New Delhi	India	In2it First Tour In India "IN2IT X ION"	Siri Fort Auditorium
May 31, 2019	Tokyo	Japan	In2it First Tour In Japan "IN2IT X ION"	Kanda Akirajin Hall
December 5, 2019	Warsaw	Poland	"IN2IT X ION" In2It First Europe Tour	Progresja (Noise Stage)
December 6, 2019	Sofia	Bulgaria	"IN2IT X ION" In2It First Europe Tour	Joy Station
December 8, 2019	Bucharest	Romania	"IN2IT X ION" In2It First Europe Tour	Palatul National al Copiilor

== Filmography ==
In2It has been featured in interviews, variety shows, and behind-the-scenes content. Their film content is as listed below.

- Get In2It (Naver/V Live, 2017)
- In2It X LieV (Naver/V Live, 2017)
- Game Life Bar (a tvN digital original) (tvN/YouTube/Facebook, 2017)
- It's your first time in Hell, Right (Mnet/Facebook/MNET VOD, 2017)
- In2It X Rooftop Live (Naver/V Live, 2018)
- Genie Idol - In2It (Idol Show K-rush3) (KBS World, 2018)
- In2It X Casper Radio (Naver/V Live, 2018)
- [Pops in Seoul] Come on! In2It (인투잇)'s Spin The Roulette (Naver/Arirang K-pop, 2018)
- [Idol League] Come On! In2It (인투잇)! (Stark) (Facebook/Twitter/YouTube, 2018)
