= TST (band) =

South Korean boy band formed by JSL Company in 2017

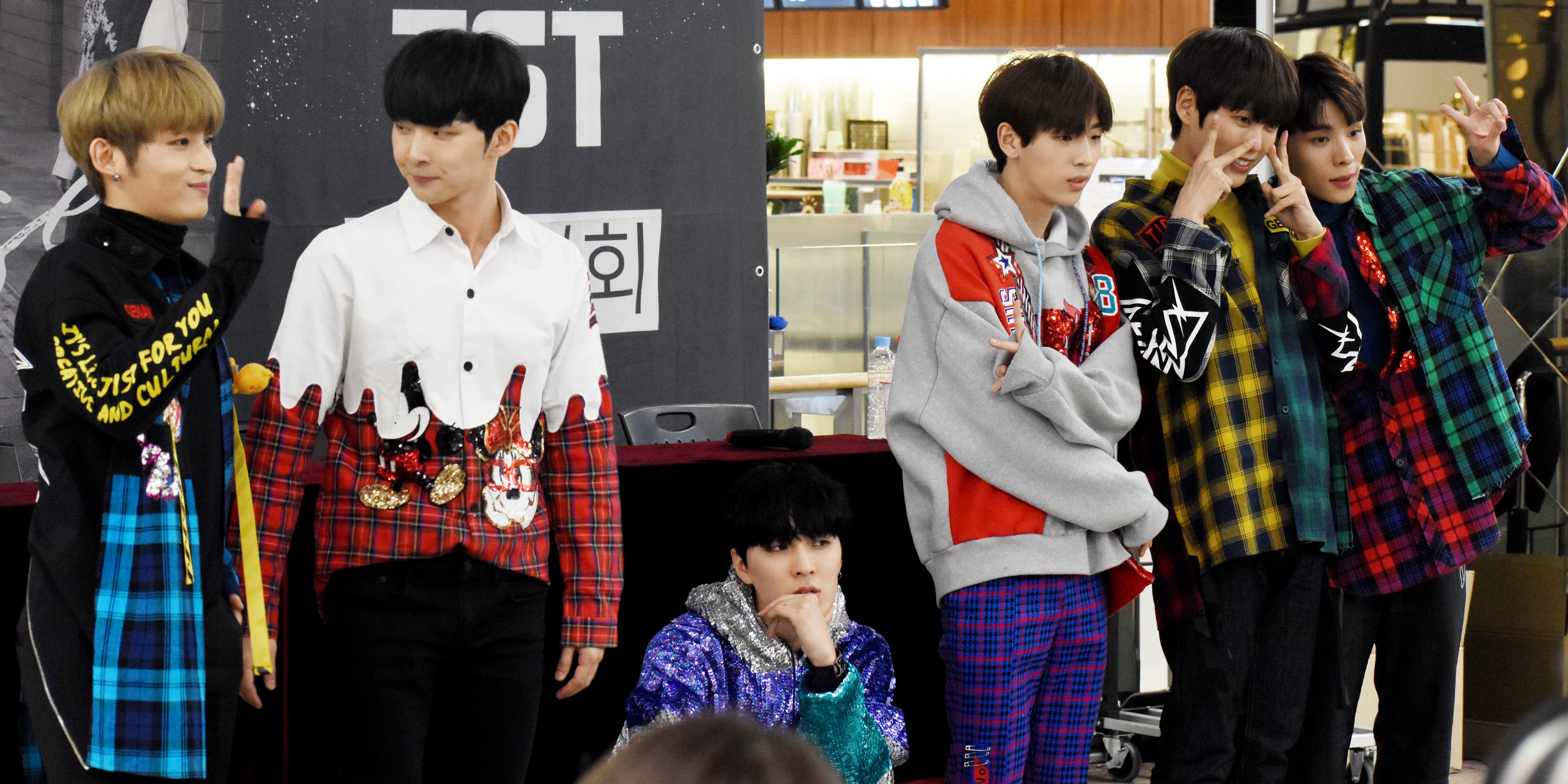
- TST at an autograph event at Lotte Mall in Gimpo, November 2018; L–R: Yonghyeon, Wooyoung, Ain, Junghoon, Yohan (former), K

Background information
- Also known as: Top Secret
- Origin: Seoul, South Korea
- Genres: K-pop
- Years active: 2017–2020
- Label: KJ Music
- Past members: K; Ain; Yohan; Wooyoung; Junghoon; Yonghyeon; Kyeongha

TST, formerly known as Top Secret (Korean: 일급비밀; RR: Ilgeubbimil), is a South Korean boy band formed by JSL Company (now known as KJ Music) in 2017. They debuted on January 4, 2017, with Time's Up.

== History ==
=== 2017–2018: Debut, name change and Kyeongha's departure ===
On January 4, 2017, Top Secret debuted as a seven member group under KJ Music Entertainment with the mini album Time's Up. The group then later came back with the mini album Wake Up on June 4, 2017.

On April 3, 2018, the group changed their name from "Top Secret" to "TST". On May 23, 2018, TST released their first single "Love Story". This was Kyeongha's last release with the group.

On May 24, 2018, it was reported that Kyeongha was found guilty of sexual assault. The victim stated that Kyeongha told her that she aroused his sexual desire while walking on the sidewalk, and when she ran away from him, he followed her into a building and sexually assaulted her in December 2014. His management agency denied the accusation, when the victim's online post began to circulate after his debut with the group. The victim then filed a lawsuit in April 2017. Kyeongha and his agency, JSL Company, denied the allegations and filed an appeal on May 29. On May 31, 2018 he received a prison sentence of 18 months in prison, with a probation period of three years, along with 40 hours of treatment program for sexual offenders. After news broke out, M Countdown decided to cancel TST's appearance on the show. On June 11, 2018, it was announced that Kyeongha left the group.

On November 1, 2018, the group returned as a six member group with the single "Paradise".

=== 2019–present: Wooyoung's hiatus, Wake Up, K's military enlistment and Yohan's death ===
On February 11, 2019, TST released the extended play Wake Up, which shares the same name as their second mini album. Wooyoung didn't take part in the EP and in the subsequent releases due to health issues.

On February 20, 2019, KJ Music reported through TST's fan cafè that member K would be enlisting in the military to complete his mandatory service on March 21, 2019.

On January 2, 2020, TST released the single "Countdown" as four members.

On June 16, 2020, Yohan died at the age of 28. The cause of death wasn't revealed.

== Former Members ==
- Ain (아인)
- K (케이)
- Wooyoung (우영)
- Junghoon (정훈)
- Yonghyun (용현)
- Kyeongha (경하)
- Yohan (요한)

== Discography ==
=== Extended plays ===
Title	Album details	Peak chart positions	Sales
Title	Album details	KOR	Sales
Time's Up	Released: January 4, 2017; Label: JSL Company, OGAM Entertainment; Formats: CD, digital download; Track listing: 1. Time's Up; 2. She; 3. Something Special; 4. Don't Call Me (이름 부르지도 마); 5. Without You	23	KOR: 1,923
Wake Up	Released: June 4, 2017; Label: JSL Company, LOEN Entertainment; Formats: CD, digital download; Track listing: 1. Can't Wait (못견디게); 2. Mind Control; 3. Dumb (좋다니까); 4. Up & Down (하루 열댓번); 5. Yesman	27	KOR: 1,116

=== Single albums ===
Title	Album details	Peak chart positions	Sales
Title	Album details	KOR	Sales
Love Story	Released: May 23, 2018; Label: JSL Company, LOEN Entertainment; Formats: CD, digital download	24	KOR: +1,204
Paradise	Released: November 1, 2018; Label: JSL Company, LOEN Entertainment; Formats: CD, digital download	36	KOR: +1,236
Wake Up(single)	Released: February 11, 2019; Label: KJ Music Entertainment, OGAM Entertainment; Formats: CD, digital download	43	KOR: +1,431
Countdown	Released: January 2, 2020; Label: KJ Music Entertainment, OGAM Entertainment; Formats: CD, digital download	42	KOR: TBA

=== Singles ===
Title	Year	Peak chart positions	Sales (DL)	Album
Title	Year	KOR	Sales (DL)	Album
TopSecret
"She"	2017	—	—N/a	Time's Up
"Mind Control"	2017	—	—N/a	Wake Up
"Love Story"	2018	—	KOR: 1,204 (CD)	Love Story
TST
"Paradise"	2018	—	KOR: 1,236 (CD)	Paradise
"Wake Up"	2019	—	—N/a	Wake Up
"Countdown"	2020	—	—N/a	Countdown
"—" denotes releases that did not chart.
