= Walkin' (EP) =

EP by Suran
- Released: June 2, 2017
- Length: 18:22
- Label: Million Market; LOEN Entertainment
- Producer: Suran; Tak; Deanfluenza; highhopes; Slow Rabbit; Suga; June; Kriz; Primary

Suran chronology
Walkin' (2017)	Jumpin (2019)

Singles from Walkin'
- 1. "Wine" Released: April 27, 2017; 2. "1+1=0" Released: June 2, 2017

Walkin' is the debut mini-album by South Korean singer Suran. It was released on June 2, 2017, by Million Market and distributed by LOEN Entertainment. It consists of five songs, including "Wine" featuring rapper Changmo, previously released as a digital single, and the title track "1+1=0" featuring singer Dean.

The EP was a moderate success, entering at number 30 on the Gaon Album Chart.

== Release ==
Walkin' was released through several music portals, including Melon, and iTunes, for the global market.

== Singles ==
"Wine" was released as a single on April 27, 2017, previous to the EP conception. It features rapper Changmo and was produced by BTS's Suga. The song entered at number 4 on the Gaon Digital Chart on the chart issue dated April 23–29, 2017, with 165,012 downloads sold and 3,499,689 streams. In its second week, the song peaked at number 2. The song entered at number 34 for the month of April 2017 with 198,424 downloads sold. For the month of May 2017, the song peaked at number 4 with 373,907 downloads sold. For the month of June 2017, the song placed at number 11 with 203,935 downloads sold. The song has sold over 776,266 downloads as of June 2017. The song was the 15th best selling song of 2017, with 1,502,265 downloads.

"1+1=0" was released as the title track in conjunction with the EP on June 2, 2017, and features singer Dean. The song entered at number 45 on the Gaon Digital Chart on the chart issue dated May 28 - June 3, 2017, with 50,668 downloads sold and 767,433 streams. In its second week, the song peaked at number 32, with 50,508 downloads sold with 1,763,992 streams. The song entered at number 48 for the month of June 2017 with 150,343 downloads sold. The song also debuted at number 66, on Billboard Korea's K-pop Hot 100.

== Commercial performance ==
Walkin' entered at number 30 on the Gaon Album Chart on the chart issue dated June 4–10, 2017. In its second week, the EP fell to number 95 and dropped off the chart the following week. The EP entered at number 74 on the chart for the month of June 2017 with 963 physical copies sold.

== Track listing ==
Digital download
No.	Title	Lyrics	Music	Arrangement	Length
1.	"Walking"	Suran; Lee Hyunseo	Suran; Tak	Tak; Suran	3:49
2.	"1+1=0" (featuring Dean)	Deanfluenza	Deanfluenza; highhopes	Deanfluenza; highhopes	3:12
3.	"Wine / If I Get Drunk Today" (오늘 취하면; oneul chwihamyeon; featuring Changmo)	Suran; Slow Rabbit; Changmo; June	Slow Rabbit; Suga; Suran; June	Slow Rabbit; Suga	3:52
4.	"Babybaby" (쩔쩔매줘; jjeoljjeolmaejwo)	Suran; Kriz; ACSERUM	Suran; Kriz	Kriz	3:13
5.	"Yo" (해요; haeyo; featuring Swings)	Suran; ACSERUM; Swings	Suran; Primary	Primary	4:16
Total length:					18:22

== Charts ==
Chart (2017)	Peak position
South Korea (Gaon Album Chart)	30

== Release history ==
Region	Date	Format	Label
South Korea	June 2, 2017	CD, digital download	Million Market, LOEN Entertainment
Various	June 2, 2017	Digital download	Million Market, LOEN Entertainment
