= One Day (single album) =

Single album by One
- Released: July 11, 2017
- Length: 6:38
- Label: YG Entertainment; Genie Music
- Producer: ONE; iHwak; Cha Cha Malone; Groovy Room

One chronology
One Day (2017)	PRVT 01 (2019)

Music video
- "Gettin' By" on YouTube "Heyahe" on YouTube

One Day is the debut single album by South Korean rapper One. It was released on July 11, 2017, by YG Entertainment and distributed by Genie Music. It was One's only musical release under YG before his departure on July 7, 2019.

The single album peaked at number 6 on the Gaon Album Chart.

== Release ==
The single album was digitally released on July 11, 2017, through several music portals, including MelOn in South Korea, and on iTunes worldwide. It was physically released on July 18.

== Commercial performance ==
One Day debuted at number 10 on the Gaon Album Chart, on the chart issue dated July 9–15, 2017. In its second week, the single album fell to number 11 and peaked at number 6 in its third week. The single album placed at number 14 on the Gaon Album Chart for the month of July 2017, with 8,551 physical copies sold.

The song "Gettin' By" debuted at number 59 on the Gaon Digital Chart, on the chart issue dated July 9–15, 2017, with 34,949 downloads sold. The song "Heyahe" debuted at number 78 on the componing Download Chart with 20,880 downloads sold in the same week.

== Track listing ==
Credits adapted from Genie.

Digital download
No.	Title	Lyrics	Music	Arrangement	Length
1.	"Gettin' By" (그냥 그래; geunyang geurae)	ONE	ONE; iHwak; Cha Cha Malone	Cha Cha Malone	3:33
2.	"Heyahe" (해야해; haeyahae)	ONE	ONE; iHwak; Groovy Room	GroovyRoom	3:05
Total length:					6:38

One Day – iTunes EP - Physical CD
No.	Title	Music	Arrangement	Length
3.	"Gettin' By" (Instrumental)	ONE; iHawk; Cha Cha Malone	Cha Cha Malone	3:33
4.	"Heyahe" (Instrumental)	ONE; iHawk; GroovyRoom	GroovyRoom	3:05
Total length:				12:16

== Charts ==
=== Weekly chart ===
Chart (2017)	Peak position
South Korea (Gaon Album Chart)	6

=== Monthly chart ===
Chart (2017)	Peak position
South Korea (Gaon Album Chart)	14

== Release history ==
Region	Date	Format	Label
South Korea	July 11, 2017	Digital download	YG Entertainment, Genie Music
Various	July 11, 2017	Digital download	YG Entertainment, Genie Music
South Korea	July 18, 2017	CD	YG Entertainment, Genie Music
