= Boys24 =

South Korean boy group

- Origin: Seoul, South Korea
- Genres: K-Pop
- Years active: 2016–2017
- Label: MMO/CJ E&M
- Past members: Doha; Youngdoo (Jiahn); Yeontae; Inho; Louoon; Jinkyu; Seonghwan; Sungho; Hyunuk; Isaac; Jihyeong; Chani; Jaehyun; Minhwan; Inpyo; Haejoon; Hongin; Jinsub; Sunghyun; Yongkwon; Jaemin; Yonghyun; Woojin; Changmin; San; Hocheol; Jinseok; Hwayoung
- Website: http://boys24.mnet.com/

Boys24 (Korean: 소년24 'Sonyeon Ishipsa', stylized as BOYS24) was a South Korean pre-debut boy band formed by CJ E&M through a 2016 survival show with the same name. There were twenty-seven members in the group divided into four units. The group performed regular shows in their own concert hall, with the debut of the final eight members IN2IT on October 26, 2017.

The first promotional unit (later dubbed Unit Black) who were selected from the 'BOYS24 The 1st Semi-Final' concert consists of Park Doha, Hwang Inho, Oh Jinseok, Kim Sunghyun, Kim Yonghyun, Jung Yeontae, Yoo Youngdoo and Han Hyunuk. The unit release their first single album, Steal Your Heart on April 11, 2017 on Mnet's M! Countdown with the song title "Steal Your Heart".

After completing 260 concerts, the final group was selected from "The Final", consist of eight members: Yoo Youngdoo (Yoo Jiahn), Jeong Yeontae, Hwang Inho, Han Hyunuk, Isaac Voo, Lee Inpyo, Kim Jinsub and Kim Sunghyun. They debuted on October 26, 2017 as IN2IT.

== History ==
On January 10, 2016 CJ E&M announced that they were investing 25 billion won ($20.6 million) over the next three years in a new boy band to perform throughout the year at a permanent venue. CJ E&M had named the boy band and project name "Boys24", to air the whole process from selecting members to performing in front of audiences.

=== Concept of Boys24 ===
First, Ahn Seok-joon set the stage of 'Boys24' as four stages, the first being 'excavation'. Of the total of 5500 applicants, 49 were selected by Mnet.com as untreated gemstones. The second stage was 'competition'. The unfinished 49 people formed a total of seven unit teams, where they would vividly confirm their intense competition. The third stage was 'growth', a process of the birth of a 24-member Boys24, which would be confirmed in the theater. The final stage was 'evolution'. It could be said that they had evolved to become a crystal, and among the 24 people, a few select members who had the highest level in all aspects would make their debut as an idol group. They would enter the world of 'pro' and start full-scale activity.

=== January 2016 – August 2017 ===
The auditions were held from January 18 to February 19. However, due to the large number of applicants, which was more than 4000, the final date of the audition was shifted to March 11. Forty-nine participants who passed the audition competed in a survival show which began airing on 18 June 2016.

After the survival show ended, twenty-eight people were selected as Boys24 members, and the group held their concert three to five days a week in rotation. The concert was set to take place at the Boys 24 X Booto Hall, also known as Mesa Hall, near Shinsegae's duty-free shop in Myeongdong, Seoul. The first concert was held on September 22, 2016.

On August 25, 2016 the group made a special appearance at M! Countdown performing their song "Rising Star". In September 2016, Yellow Unit from the group were chosen as the models for 새싹보리 a barley drink, sold by CJ Health Care. On September 10, 2016, Unit Yellow and Unit Sky from the group held their first fan meeting in Hong Kong. On September 27 and 28, 2016, the group held "Boys24 Live Preview" press call at their own hall to promote their own concert.

On November 2, 2016, Unit Yellow's music video for "E" was released as an award for the unit for being MVP Unit. The track also released on music sites and charted No.1 on Mnet's music chart. On November 3, 2016, Unit Yellow and Unit Sky made a special appearance at M! Countdown performing their song "E". A week later all units from the group made a special appearance again on M! Countdown performing "E".

On December 1, 2016, the group announced that they would collaborate with DIA TV as part of Monthly Idol project broadcasting with various creators from DIA TV. On December 7, 2016, the group released two versions of their first live album from their concert BOYS24 LIVE in CD format. The first version of the album was recorded by Unit White and Unit Green while the second version of the album was recorded by Unit Sky and Unit Yellow.

On February 14, 2017, Lee Hwayoung was removed from the group and his contract was cancelled following his leaked audio controversy for making offensive comments about fans.

On March 5, 2017, the group held 'BOYS24 The 1st Semi-Final' concert at the Hall of Peace at Kyung Hee University in Dongdaemun, Seoul. The concert was broadcast live on Mnet and M2. Through the concert Park Doha, Jin Sungho, Hwang Inho, Oh Jinseok, Kim Sunghyun, Kim Yonghyun, Jung Yeontae, Yoo Youngdoo and Han Hyunuk were selected to promote as promotional unit for three months. The promotional unit would perform on KCON Japan, music programs, and entertainment shows.

On March 10, 2017, CJ E&M and Liveworks announced that Jin Sungho to leave his position as part of the first promotional unit but still remain in the group following controversies about his past actions in junior high school. The first promotional unit would move forward as an eight-member group.

On March 23, 2017, the group announced that the first promotional unit official name was Unit Black. The name was voted by fans through a team naming event that was announced on the group's official fan cafe. On April 11, 2017, the unit released their first single album, Steal Your Heart on Mnet's M! Countdown with their song "Steal Your Heart".

On August 12, 2017, the group held 'BOYS24 The Final' concert at Olympic Park Olympic Hall, Seoul, marking the end of Boys24 survival project after 1 year and 6 months. The concert was broadcast live through V Live. Hwang Inho, Jung Yeontae, Kim Jinsub, Kim Sunghyun, Yoo Youngdoo, Isaac Voo, and Jin Sungho were announced as final group members by fans vote, while Lee Inpyo and Han Hyunuk were selected as Wild Card directly by company, completing final line-up as nine-member group. The final group would start their overseas promotions right away, starting with visiting Japan on August 26 followed by Korea Tourism Organization invitation to Kazakhstan in September.

On August 14, 2017, MMO Entertainment, who manage the debut team, announced that Jin Sungho had left the team due to differing musical point of view.

== Survival show ==
Boys24
- Presented by: Oh Yeon-seo
- Country of origin: South Korea
- Original language: Korean
- No. of seasons: 1
- No. of episodes: 8 (see list)

Production
- Executive producers: Shin Hyeong-kwan; Jung Hyeong-jin; Oh Kwang-suk
- Producer: Kang Hee-jung
- Running time: 80–120 minutes
- Production companies: CJ E&M; Liveworks Company; N2 Studios

Original release
- Network: Mnet; tvN
- Release: June 18, 2016

The survival show with the same name as the group was a 2016 reality boy group unit survival show that aired every Saturday 10pm on Mnet and tvN. It was a large-scale project in which the units of a selected number of members would be produced from a pool of 49 free-agents.

The show consists of 8 episodes, airing from June 18, 2016 to August 6, 2016. The highest ratings for this show is 0.8%.

=== MC & masters ===
- Oh Yeon-seo (MC)
- Shin Hye-sung (Director)
- Lee Min-woo (Director)
- Jeon Bong-jin (Vocal Master)
- Ha Hwi-dong (Dance Master)
- Vasco (Rap Master)
- Yoo Jae-hwan (Special Vocal Master)
- Basick (Special Rap Master)
- Choi Young-joon (Special Dance Master)

=== Winners ===
The winners of BOYS24 are Unit Yellow, Unit White, Unit Green, and Unit Sky. Unit Yellow were selected as the MVP team and were awarded 200 million won (approximately $171,220) of investment into their music production and unit activities promotion. Sangmin from Unit Sky withdrew from BOYS24 for personal reasons, which included health issues. Online votes were held to pick five contestants who were formerly eliminated on the show to replace Sangmin's position. The votes took place August 10–15 with the winners of the vote being announced on August 16. The five contestants with the highest votes were Jin Sungho, Jung Yeontae, Han Hyunuk, Kim Sunghyun, and Tak Jinkyu. Jin Sungho was added to Unit Green, Jung Yeontae was added to Unit Yellow, Kim Sunghyun was added to Unit White, Han Hyunuk and Tak Jinkyu were added to Unit Sky.

=== Episodes Guide ===
Episode 1-8

Episode and Mission	Unit Blue	Unit White	Unit Purple	Unit Sky	Unit Red	Unit Green	Unit Yellow
1, 2 - Top 7 Qualification							
1, 2 - Top 7 Qualification							Performed: Teen Top's Warning Sign Eliminated: Giseok'
3	Performed: EXO's "Call Me Baby" Eliminated: Kyuhyun'	Performed: Beast's "Shock" Eliminated: Gwanghyun'	Performed: SHINee's "Sherlock" Eliminated: Yunsol'	Performed: BTS's "Dope" Eliminated: Suhan'	Performed: Block B's "Very Good" Eliminated: Hechan'	Performed: Infinite's "Be Mine" Eliminated: Shin Jingyu'	Performed: Teen Top's Warning Sign Eliminated: Giseok'
4 - Mix & Match Song and Genre (1st group elimination)	Performed: GFriend's "Rough" in traditional music genre Scored: 263	Performed: Twice's "Cheer Up" in hip hop genre Scored: 259	Performed: Sistar19's "Gone Not Around Any Longer" in acoustic genre Scored: 245 [Eliminated]	Performed: Winner's "Sentimental" in acoustic genre Scored: 251 Note: Leader was changed from Yonghyun to Sangmin	Performed: GD X Taeyang's "Good Boy" in EDM genre. Scored: 249	Performed: VIXX's "On and On" in musical genre Scored: 257	Performed: Block B's "HER" in R&B genre Scored: 287 Note: Leader was changed from Jinseok to Louoon
5 - Capture the Heart of Girls (2nd group elimination)	Chose GOT7's "Just Right", but the song was swapped with Unit Sky's. Performed: TVXQ's "Mirotic" Scored: 393 [Eliminated]	Chose BTS's "I Need U", but the song was swapped with Unit Red's. Performed: 2PM's "10 Out of 10" Scored: 394		Chose TVXQ's "Mirotic", but the song was swapped with Unit Blue's. Performed: GOT7's "Just Right" Scored: 447	Received (because they were last place in the last challenge) 2PM's "10 Out of 10", but the song was swapped with Unit White's. Performed: BTS's "I Need U" Scored: 398	Chose SHINee's "Dream Girl", but the song was swapped with Unit Yellow's. Performed: Seventeen's Adore U Scored: 417	Chose Seventeen's Adore U, but the song was swapped with Unit Green's. Performed: SHINee's "Dream Girl" Scored: 430
6 (and 1st half of episode 7) - 1st Generation Idols' Hit Songs (Members' Revival)		Added into the group: Inho Performed: Sechs Kies's "Com' Back" Eliminated: Junseo'		Added into the group: Insoo Performed: H.O.T.'s "Candy" Eliminated: Insoo (Sangmin was picked by In Soo as candidate for elimination)'	Added into the group: Yeontae Performed: 1TYM's "1tym" Eliminated: Won'	Added into the group: Hocheol Performed: Shinhwa's "Brand New" Eliminated: Wooyoung'	Added into the group: Changmin Performed: g.o.d's "Friday Night" Eliminated: David'
7 (2nd half of the episode) - Final's Pre-mission - Vocal, Rap, Performance Battle 8 - Final Performance battle [extra 24 points for final mission]		Vocal representative: Doha Rap representative: Jinsub Performed: Time Leap Master 235 points + audience 611 points = 846 points [BOYS 24]		Vocal representative: Hwayoung Rap representative: Yonghyun Performed: Bop Master 294 points + audience 595 points + extra 24 points of Rap Representative = 913 points [BOYS 24]	Vocal representative: Yeontae Rap representative: Sungho Performed: Starlight Master 225 points + audience 610 points = 835 points [Eliminated]	Vocal representative: Inpyo Rap representative: Jihyeong Performed: Candy Shop Master 284 points + audience 583 points + extra 24 points of Vocal Representative = 891 points [BOYS 24]	Vocal representative: Seonghwan Rap representative: Changmin Performed: Yolo Master 304 points + audience 602 points + extra 24 points of Performance Representative = 930 points [BOYS 24 MVP unit]

=== Episodes Ratings ===
- Episode 1 : 2016.6.18 : TOP7 selection : n/a
- Episode 2 : 2016.6.25 : TOP7 chose Unit members and mission : 0.8%
- Episode 3 : 2016.7.02 : Unit mission : 0.6%
- Episode 4 : 2016.6.09 : First Unit Mission : n/a
- Episode 5 : 2016.6.16 : Second Unit Mission : n/a
- Episode 6 : 2016.6.23 : Third Unit Mission : n/a
- Episode 7 : 2016.6.30 : Third Unit Mission : n/a
- Episode 8 : 2016.8.06 : Final Unit Mission : 0.8%

== Members ==
At the final episode of the survival show, the group originally had twenty-four members that were separated in to four units. The units were Unit Yellow, Unit White, Unit Green, and Unit Sky with each unit containing six members. However, shortly after the survival show ended Lee Sangmin withdrew from the group then five eliminated members were revived to replace his position. The revival made each unit consist of seven members and the total group then consisted of twenty-eight members. Unit Yellow consists Jung Yeontae, Lee Louoon, Choi Seonghwan, Oh Jinseok, Kim Hongin, Shin Jaemin, and Lee Changmin. Unit White consists of Park Doha, Yoo Youngdoo, Hwang Inho, Choi Jaehyun, Lee Haejoon, Kim Jinsub, and Kim Sunghyun. Unit Green consists of Jin Sungho, Go Jihyeong, Choi Chani, Jung Minhwan, Lee Inpyo, Kang San, and Chae Hocheol. Unit Sky consists of Tak Jinkyu, Han Hyunuk, Isaac Voo, Park Yongkwon, Kim Yonghyun, Lee Woojin, and Lee Hwayoung. Lee Louoon, Park Doha, Lee Inpyo, and Kim Yonghyun were leaders of their respective units. This Unit line-up performed from September 22, 2016, to March 19, 2017.

On November 20, 2016, the group announced that they would perform with the new line-up that was called Collabo line-up. The Collabo line-up swapped: four members between Unit White and Unit Sky; three members between Unit Yellow and Unit Green. Collabo Yellow consists of Lee Louoon, Choi Seonghwan, Lee Changmin, Kang San, Jung Minhwan, Jin Sungho, and Chae Hocheol. Collabo White consists of Park Doha, Hwang Inho, Lee Haejoon, Kim Sunghyun, Han Hyunuk, Isaac Voo, and Lee Woojin. Collabo Green consists of Go Jihyeong, Lee Inpyo, Choi Chani, Jung Yeontae, Oh Jinseok, Kim Hongin, and Shin Jaemin. Collabo Sky consists of Tak Jinkyu, Kim Yonghyun, Park Yongkwon, Choi Jaehyun, Yoo Youngdoo, Kim Jinsub, and Lee Hwayoung. The Collabo line-up performed from December 7, 2016, to March 14, 2017.

On February 10, 2017, Lee Hwayoung stopped performing on concert then was removed from the group on February 14, 2017. His departures made Unit Sky and Collabo Sky consist of six members and the total group consists twenty-seven members.

On March 5, 2017, the group announced new units which are Unit White, Unit Red, Unit Blue, and Unit Purple. The respective leaders from each unit are Jin Sungho, Hwang Inho, Park Doha, and Kim Sunghyun who were chosen from the members with the highest points voted by fans. Unit White consists of Park Doha, Yoo Youngdoo, Oh Jinseok, Lee Louoon, Isaac Voo, Go Jihyeong, and Kang San. Unit Red consists of Jin Sungho, Han Hyunuk, Tak Jinkyu, Choi Chani, Lee Haejoon, Kim Hongin, and Park Yongkwon. Unit Blue consists of Hwang Inho, Kim Yonghyun, Jung Minhwan, Lee Inpyo, Shin Jaemin, Lee Changmin, and Chae Hocheol. Unit Purple consists of Kim Sunghyun, Jung Yeontae, Choi Seonghwan, Choi Jaehyun, Kim Jinsub and Lee Woojin. This new units line-up would perform starting from March 24, 2017.

On March 10, 2017, Jin Sungho voluntarily left his position from Unit Red leader. On March 24, 2017, the group announced that Tak Jinkyu to be the leader of Unit Red for temporary. On July 5, CJ E&M announced that Oh Jinseok would not be participating in the final of Boys24, but would finish the BOYS24 Live Concert up until August 6.

=== Current members ===
Unit White

Name	Date of birth	Remarks
Park Do-ha (박도하)	March 27, 1992 (age 34)	Top 2 (Note: Unit leader) (Note: Member of first promotional unit)
Yoo Young-doo (유영두)	April 1, 1992 (age 34)	
Lee Lo-uoon (이로운)	September 15, 1993 (age 33)	
Isaac Voo (부아이젝)	December 12, 1994 (age 31)	
Oh Jin-seok (오진석)	January 7, 1995 (age 31)	Top 7
Go Ji-hyeong (고지형)	March 23, 1995 (age 31)	
Kang San (강산)	October 28, 1997 (age 28)	

Unit Red

Name	Date of birth	Remarks
Tak Jin-kyu (탁진규)	February 10, 1994 (age 32)	(Note: Revived members from voting)
Jin Sung-ho (진성호)	July 18, 1994 (age 32)	Top 5
Han Hyun-uk (한현욱)	September 26, 1994 (age 31)	
Choe Chan-i (최찬이)	June 14, 1995 (age 31)	
Lee Hae-joon (이해준)	August 16, 1995 (age 31)	
Kim Hong-in (김홍인)	September 4, 1995 (age 31)	
Park Yong-kwon (박용권)	May 22, 1996 (age 30)	

Unit Blue

Name	Date of birth	Remarks
Hwang In-ho (황인호)	June 21, 1993 (age 33)	Top 1 (Note: Revived members from revival mission)
Jung Min-hwan (정민환)	July 26, 1995 (age 31)	
Lee In-pyo (이인표)	August 14, 1995 (age 31)	Top 6
Shin Jae-min (신재민)	June 8, 1996 (age 30)	
Kim Yong-hyun (김용현)	September 13, 1996 (age 30)	Top 4
Lee Chang-min(이창민)	February 19, 1997 (age 29)	
Chae Ho-cheol (채호철)	November 8, 1997 (age 28)	

Unit Purple

Name	Date of birth	Remarks
Jeong Yeon-tae (정연태)	July 6, 1992 (age 34)	Top 3
Choi Seong-hwan (최성환)	June 30, 1994 (age 32)	
Choi Jae-hyun (최재현)	July 25, 1995 (age 31)	
Kim Jin-sub (김진섭)	January 3, 1996 (age 30)	
Kim Sung-hyun (김성현)	March 16, 1996 (age 30)	
Lee Woo-jin (이우진)	November 22, 1996 (age 29)	

=== Promotional unit ===
Unit Black (first Apromotional unit)

Name	Votes			Total	Remarks
Name	Early voting	SMS	Audience vote	Total	Remarks
Park Do-ha (박도하)	24.8	25.7	33.9	84.5	1st Member
~~Jin Sung-ho (진성호)~~	~~30.0~~	~~30.0~~	~~16.8~~	~~76.8~~	~~2nd Member~~ (Note: Withdrawn from his position as part of promotional unit.)
Hwang In-ho (황인호)	29.2	27.9	14.6	71.6	3rd Member
Oh Jin-seok (오진석)	19.8	21.4	26.8	67.9	4th Member
Kim Sung-hyun (김성현)	24.6	23.6	19.6	67.8	5th Member
Kim Yong-hyun (김용현)	15.7	17.1	24.8	57.7	6th Member
Jung Yeon-tae (정연태)	6.2	10.7	40.0	56.9	7th Member
Yoo Young-doo (유영두)	16.0	19.3	17.4	52.7	8th Member
Han Hyun-uk (한현욱)	None				Wild Card (Note: Wild Card member was picked by staff.)

=== Debuting members (the final) ===
Name	Votes		Total	Remarks
Name	Early voting	Audience vote	Total	Remarks
Hwang In-ho (황인호)	47.50	24.40	71.90	1st Member
Jung Yeon-tae (정연태)	19.17	50.00	69.17	2nd Member
Kim Jin-sub (김진섭)	28.25	34.23	62.48	3rd Member
Kim Sung-hyun (김성현)	35.25	20.24	55.49	4th Member
Yoo Young-doo (유영두; Jiahn)	20.01	32.14	52.15	5th Member
Isaac Voo (부아이젝)	21.56	22.02	43.58	6th Member
~~Jin Sung-ho (진성호)~~	~~24.32~~	~~18.45~~	~~42.77~~	~~7th Member~~ (Note: Withdrawn from his position as part of final line-up)
Lee In-pyo (이인표)	22.81	15.77	38.58	8th Member (Note: Wild Card member picked by staff.)
Han Hyun-uk (한현욱)	23.86	14.58	38.44	9th Member

=== Past members ===
List of Past Members

Post-survival show departures

Name	Date of birth	Unit	Remarks
Kim Sang-min (김상민)	December 22, 1993 (age 32)	Unit Sky	Withdrawn on August 9, 2016
Lee Hwa-young (이화영)	February 1, 1996 (age 30)	Unit Sky	Removed on February 14, 2017
Oh Jin-seok (오진석)	January 7, 1995 (age 31)	Unit Yellow, Unit White, Unit Black	Withdrawn on July 5, 2017 (departed on August 6, 2017)

Eliminated on The Survival Show

Name	Date Of Birth	Unit	Remarks
Alex Moon (문 알렉스)	July 2, 2002 (age 24)	Unit Red	(Note: Eliminated on Final Stage (Episode 8))
David Shin (신 데이비드)	December 16, 1997 (age 28)	Unit Yellow	(Note: Eliminated on 1st Generation Idol Songs Mission (Episode 6 or 7))
Park Woo-young (박우영)	January 24, 1998 (age 28)	Unit Green	
Park Jun-seo (박준서)	December 28, 2001 (age 24)	Unit White	
Nam-goong Won (남궁원)	June 14, 1993 (age 33)	Unit Red	
Lee In-soo (이인수)	January 16, 1996 (age 30)	Unit Blue, Unit Sky	(Note: Eliminated on Capturing Girls' Heart Mission (Episode 5))
Kim Tae-dong (김태동)	November 7, 1997 (age 28)	Unit Blue	
Kim Tae-yeon (김태연)	November 15, 1996 (age 29)	Unit Blue	
Yoon Jong-hyuk (윤종혁)	February 19, 1997 (age 29)	Unit Blue	
Kim Hyeon-jin (김현진)	November 15, 1996 (age 29)	Unit Purple	(Note: Eliminated on Mix and Match Mission (Episode 4))

Name	Date Of Birth	Unit	Remarks
Shim Yeon-seok (심연숙)	September 15, 1992 (age 34)	Unit Purple	
Jo Yoon-hyung (조윤형)	August 16, 1996 (age 30)	Unit Purple	
Lee Sang-wook (이상욱)	April 14, 1993 (age 33)	Unit Purple	
Jung Gi-seok (정기석)	May 2, 1997 (age 29)	Unit Yellow	(Note: Eliminated on Sharp Dance Routine Mission (Episode 3))
Lee Gwang-hyun (이광현)	August 23, 1998 (age 28)	Unit White	
Shin Kyu-hyun (신규현)	December 19, 1995 (age 30)	Unit Blue	
Shin Jin-kyu (신진규)	May 31, 2001 (age 25)	Unit Green	
Park Yoon-sol (박윤솔)	October 21, 1996 (age 29)	Unit Purple	
Yang Hee-chan (양희찬)	July 31, 1999 (age 27)	Unit Red	
Kim Su-han (김수한)	January 8, 1993 (age 33)	Unit Sky	

=== Elimination ===
Member Elimination Chart

Color key

– Unit Yellow
– Unit White
– Unit Green
– Unit Sky
– Unit Red
– Unit Blue
– Unit Purple
– TOP7
– Eliminated
– Revived
– Withdrawn
– Removed
– Unit Black
– Final Group

Unit	Name	Survival Show						Revival from Fan Votes	1st Semi-Final	The Final	Debut
Unit	Name	TOP7 Selection	Sharp Dance Routines	Mix and Match	Capturing Girls' Heart	1st Generation Idol Songs	Final Stage	Revival from Fan Votes	1st Semi-Final	The Final	Debut
	Hwang Inho	91.3			ELIMINATED	REVIVED			3rd MEMBER	1st MEMBER	
	Jung Yeontae	81.0		ELIMINATED		REVIVED	ELIMINATED	REVIVED	7th MEMBER	2nd MEMBER	
	Kim Jinsub	UNKNOWN								3rd MEMBER	
	Kim Sunghyun	UNKNOWN					ELIMINATED	REVIVED	5th MEMBER	4th MEMBER	
	Yoo Youngdoo	76.0							8th MEMBER	5th MEMBER	
	Isaac Voo	70.8								6th MEMBER	
	Jin Sungho	80.3					ELIMINATED	REVIVED	~~2nd MEMBER~~	7th MEMBER	WITHDRAWN
	Lee Inpyo	80.2								8th MEMBER	
	Han Hyunuk	UNKNOWN					ELIMINATED	REVIVED	WILD CARD	9th MEMBER	
	Park Doha	85.6							1st MEMBER		
	Kim Yonghyun	80.5							6th MEMBER		
	Tak Jinkyu	UNKNOWN					ELIMINATED	REVIVED			
	Choi Chani	UNKNOWN									
	Lee Haejoon	UNKNOWN									
	Kim Hongin	76.5									
	Park Yongkwon	UNKNOWN									
	Lee Louoon	UNKNOWN									
	Go Jihyeong	UNKNOWN									
	Kang San	UNKNOWN									
	Jung Minhwan	UNKNOWN									
	Shin Jaemin	UNKNOWN									
	Lee Changmin	77.0		ELIMINATED		REVIVED					
	Chae Hocheol	60.0			ELIMINATED	REVIVED					
	Choi Seonghwan	UNKNOWN									
	Choi Jaehyun	67.0									
	Lee Woojin	UNKNOWN									
	Oh Jinseok	80.0							4th MEMBER	WITHDRAWN	
	Lee Hwayoung	67.0							REMOVED		
	Kim Sangmin	UNKNOWN						WITHDRAWN			
	Alex Moon	67.0					ELIMINATED				
	David Shin	70.5				ELIMINATED					
	Park Wooyoung	49.5				ELIMINATED					
	Park Junseo	65.5				ELIMINATED					
	Namgoong Won	UNKNOWN				ELIMINATED					
	Lee Insoo	79.5			ELIMINATED	ELIMINATED					
	Kim Taedong	UNKNOWN			ELIMINATED						
	Kim Taeyeon	UNKNOWN			ELIMINATED						
	Yoon Jonghyuk	UNKNOWN			ELIMINATED						
	Kim Hyeonjin	UNKNOWN		ELIMINATED							
	Shim Yeonseok	UNKNOWN		ELIMINATED							
	Jo Yoonhyung	UNKNOWN		ELIMINATED							
	Lee Sangwook	61.0		ELIMINATED							
	Jung Giseok	UNKNOWN	ELIMINATED								
	Lee Gwanghyun	UNKNOWN	ELIMINATED								
	Shin Kyuhyun	UNKNOWN	ELIMINATED								
	Shin Jinkyu	61.0	ELIMINATED								
	Park Yoonsol	UNKNOWN	ELIMINATED								
	Yang Heechan	UNKNOWN	ELIMINATED								
	Kim Soohan	60.0	ELIMINATED								
Notes		1, 2							3		4

Notes

- ^Note 1: Do note that some boys' performance are not broadcast thus their score is unknown. Some contestants did not get into Top 7 seats and their score has been recorded as "less than" the 7th person during their turn.
- ^Note 2: TOP7 contestants automatically become the leader of their respective unit.
- ^Note 3: Nine members of Unit Black (First Promotional Unit) were chosen from 1st Semi-Final on March 5, 2017. On March 10, 2017, Jin Sungho withdrawn from his position as part of promotional unit. The promotional unit move-forward with eight members.
- ^Note 4: Final line-up for the group would be announced on second half of 2017.

=== Timeline ===
Timeline of Units

Unit White

Unit Red

Unit Blue

Unit Purple

Unit Yellow

Unit Green

Unit Sky

== Discography ==
=== Singles ===
Title	Year	Recorded by	Album
"Rising Star"	2016	BOYS24	Non-album single
"YOLO"	2016	Unit Yellow	BOYS24 FINAL STAGE
"BOP"	2016	Unit Sky	BOYS24 FINAL STAGE
"Candy Shop"	2016	Unit Green	BOYS24 FINAL STAGE
"Time Leap"	2016	Unit White	BOYS24 FINAL STAGE
"Starlight"	2016	Unit Red	BOYS24 FINAL STAGE
"24"	2016	BOYS24	BOYS24 FINAL STAGE
"E (Unit Yellow ver.)"	2016	Unit Yellow	Non-album singles
"E"	2016	BOYS24	Non-album singles
"Steal Your Heart" (뺏겠어)	2017	Unit Black	Steal Your Heart

=== Single albums ===
Title	Album details	Peak chart positions	Sales
Title	Album details	KOR	Sales
Steal Your Heart	Released: April 11, 2017; Label: CJ E&M Entertainment; Format: CD, digital download; Track list: 1. Steal Your Heart (뺏겠어); 2. Boom; 3. Candy Shop	5	KOR: 21,890+

=== Live albums ===
Title	Album details
BOYS24 LIVE #ver1. UNIT GREEN + WHITE	Released: December 7, 2016; Label: CJ E&M; Format: CD; Track listing: 1. E 2. YOLO; 3. Boom; 4. BOP; 5. Candy Shop; 6. 하루; 7. Champ; 8. Starlight; 9. NMDR; 10. Love Operator; 11. Game Boy; 12. Time Leap; 13. Tomorrow; 14. Rising Star; 15. 24
BOYS24 LIVE #ver2. UNIT YELLOW + SKY	Release date: December 7, 2016; Label: CJ E&M; Format: CD; Track listing: 1. E 2. YOLO; 3. Boom; 4. BOP; 5. Candy Shop; 6. 하루; 7. Champ; 8. Starlight; 9. NMDR; 10. Love Operator; 11. Game Boy; 12. Time Leap; 13. Tomorrow; 14. Rising Star; 15. 24

=== Music videos ===
Year	Title	Director(s)	Notes
2016	"Rising Star"	Zanybros	49 contestants
2016	"Rising Star (Dance Version)"	Zanybros	49 contestants
2016	"E (Unit Yellow Version)"	Zanybros	Unit Yellow (Louoon, Seonghwan, Hongin, Jaemin, Jinseok, and Changmin)
2016	"E (Dance Version)"	Zanybros	28 members from 4 units
2017	"Steal Your Heart"	Zanybros	Unit Black (Doha, Inho, Jinseok, Sunghyun, Yonghyun, Yeontae, Youngdoo, and Hyunuk)

== Filmography ==
- BOYS24 (Mnet, tvN, 2016)
- Wiki BOYS24 (Mnet, 2017)
- BOYS24 The 1st Semi Final (Mnet, 2017)
- BOYS24 The Final (Naver/V Live, 2017)

== Concerts & Tours ==
=== Main Concert ===
- BOYS24 LIVE CONCERT: Seoul, South Korea (September 22nd, 2016 – August 6, 2017)
- BOYS24 The 1st Semi-Final: Seoul, South Korea (March 5th, 2017)
- BOYS24 The Final: Seoul, South Korea (August 12, 2017)

=== Join Concert ===
- KCON '17: Tokyo, Japan (May 21, 2017)
- IdolCon '17: Seoul, South Korea (May 26–27, 2017)

=== Schedule ===
BOYS24 LIVE Schedule & MVP (Seoul, September 22nd, 2016 – March 19th, 2017)

No.	Week	Date	Time	Performers								MVP	MVP Votes
No.	Week	Date	Time	Unit (Note: Unit Line-Up: Unit Yellow: Yeontae, Louoon, Seonghwan, Jinseok, Hongin, Jaemin, Changmin; Unit White: Doha, Youngdoo, Inho, Jaehyun, Haejoon, Jinsub, Sunghyun; Unit Green: Sungho, Jihyeong, Chani, Minhwan, Inpyo, San, Hocheol; Unit Sky: Jinkyu, Hyunuk, Isaac, Yongkwon, Yonghyun, Woojin, ~~Hwayoung~~)				Collabo (Note: Collabo Line-Up: Collabo Yellow: Louoon, Seonghwan, Changmin, San, Minhwan, Sungho, Hocheol; Collabo White: Doha, Inho, Haejoon, Sunghyun, Hyunuk, Isaac, Woojin; Collabo Green: Jihyeong, Inpyo, Chani, Yeontae, Jinseok, Hongin, Jaemin; Collabo Sky: Jinkyu, Yonghyun, Yongkwon, Jaehyun, Youngdoo, Jinsub, ~~Hwayoung~~)				MVP	MVP Votes
No.	Week	Date	Time	Yellow	White	Green	Sky	Yellow	White	Green	Sky	MVP	MVP Votes
1	1	September 22, 2016	8PM	✓			✓					Jinseok^{1st}	37
2	1	September 23, 2016	8PM	✓			✓					Yeontae^{1st}	27
3	1	September 24, 2016	2PM		✓	✓						Jinsub^{1st}	43
4	1	September 24, 2016	6PM		✓	✓						Doha^{1st}	55
5	1	September 25, 2016	2PM	✓			✓					Hwayoung^{1st}	49
6	1	September 25, 2016	6PM		✓	✓						Doha^{2nd}	51
7	2	September 30, 2016	8PM	✓			✓					Hwayoung^{2nd}	30
8	2	October 1, 2016	2PM		✓	✓						Doha^{3rd}	25
9	2	October 1, 2016	6PM		✓	✓						Youngdoo^{1st}	64
10	2	October 2, 2016	2PM	✓			✓					Yonghyun^{1st}	50
11	3	October 7, 2016	8PM		✓	✓						Jinsub^{2nd}	44
12	3	October 8, 2016	2PM	✓			✓					Hwayoung^{3rd}	41
13	3	October 8, 2016	6PM	✓			✓					Jinseok^{2nd}	35
14	3	October 9, 2016	2PM		✓	✓						Doha^{4th}	45
15	4	October 14, 2016	8PM	✓			✓					Isaac^{1st}	209
16	4	October 15, 2016	2PM		✓	✓						Inpyo^{1st}	113
17	4	October 15, 2016	6PM		✓	✓						Jihyeong^{1st}	134
18	4	October 16, 2016	2PM	✓			✓					Chani^{1st}	176
19	5	October 21, 2016	8PM	✓			✓					Louoon^{1st}	157
20	5	October 22, 2016	2PM	✓			✓					Yeontae^{2nd}	220
21	5	October 22, 2016	6PM	✓			✓					Changmin^{1st}	219
22	5	October 23, 2016	2PM		✓	✓						Jaehyun^{1st}	256
23	6	October 28, 2016	8PM		✓	✓						San^{1st}	202
24	6	October 29, 2016	2PM	✓			✓					Jinkyu^{1st}	146
25	6	October 29, 2016	6PM	✓			✓					Jaemin^{1st}	198
26	6	October 30, 2016	2PM	✓	✓	✓	✓					None	
27	6	October 30, 2016	6PM	✓	✓	✓	✓					None	
28	7	November 3, 2016	8PM		✓	✓						Sunghyun^{1st}	183
29	7	November 4, 2016	8PM	✓	✓							Haejoon^{1st}	192
30	7	November 5, 2016	2PM			✓	✓					Sungho^{1st}	186
31	7	November 5, 2016	6PM			✓	✓					Yonghyun^{2nd}	195
32	7	November 6, 2016	2PM	✓	✓	✓	✓					None	
33	7	November 6, 2016	6PM	✓	✓	✓	✓					None	
34	8	November 10, 2016	8PM			✓	✓					Hocheol^{1st}	159
35	8	November 11, 2016	8PM			✓	✓					Hwayoung^{4th}	208
36	8	November 12, 2016	2PM	✓	✓							Inho^{1st}	223
37	8	November 12, 2016	6PM	✓	✓							Youngdoo^{2nd}	253
38	8	November 13, 2016	2PM	✓	✓	✓	✓					None	
39	8	November 13, 2016	6PM	✓	✓	✓	✓					None	
40	9	November 16, 2016	8PM	✓	✓	✓	✓					None	
41	9	November 17, 2016	8PM		✓	✓						Jinsub^{3rd}	210
42	9	November 18, 2016	8PM	✓			✓					Seonghwan^{1st}	169
43	9	November 19, 2016	2PM		✓	✓						Minhwan^{1st}	264
44	9	November 19, 2016	6PM	✓			✓					Hongin^{1st}	214
45	9	November 20, 2016	2PM	✓	✓	✓	✓					None	
46	9	November 20, 2016	6PM	✓	✓	✓	✓					None	
47	10	November 23, 2016	8PM	✓	✓	✓	✓					Hyunuk^{1st} (Note: Leaders' choice)	None
48	10	November 24, 2016	8PM	✓	✓	✓	✓					Yongkwon^{1st}	None
49	10	November 25, 2016	8PM	✓	✓							Jinseok^{3rd}	186
50	10	November 26, 2016	2PM	✓	✓							Doha^{5th}	244
51	10	November 26, 2016	6PM			✓	✓					Hyunuk^{2nd}	176
52	10	November 27, 2016	2PM	✓	✓	✓	✓					San^{2nd}	None
53	10	November 27, 2016	6PM	✓	✓	✓	✓					Louoon^{2nd}	None
54	11	November 30, 2016	8PM	✓	✓	✓	✓					Inho^{2nd}	None
55	11	December 1, 2016	8PM	✓	✓	✓	✓					Jinkyu^{2nd}	None
56	11	December 2, 2016	8PM			✓	✓					Woojin^{1st}	160
57	11	December 3, 2016	2PM			✓	✓					Yongkwon^{2nd}	138
58	11	December 3, 2016	6PM			✓	✓					Isaac^{2nd}	149
59	12	December 7, 2016	8PM					✓			✓	Youngdoo^{3rd}	54
60	12	December 8, 2016	8PM						✓	✓		Jinseok^{4th}	65
61	12	December 9, 2016	8PM					✓			✓	Jinkyu^{3rd}	74
62	12	December 10, 2016	2PM						✓	✓		Jinseok^{5th}	59
63	12	December 10, 2016	6PM						✓	✓		Jaemin^{2nd}	113
64	12	December 11, 2016	2PM					✓	✓	✓	✓	Sunghyun^{2nd}	None
65	12	December 11, 2016	6PM					✓	✓	✓	✓	Isaac^{3rd}	None
66	13	December 14, 2016	8PM						✓	✓		Jinseok^{6th}	58
67	13	December 15, 2016	8PM					✓			✓	Changmin^{2nd}	83
68	13	December 16, 2016	8PM						✓	✓		Jihyeong^{2nd}	54
69	13	December 17, 2016	2PM					✓			✓	Jinsub^{4th}	129
70	13	December 17, 2016	6PM					✓			✓	Youngdoo^{4th}	119
71	13	December 19, 2016	2PM					✓	✓	✓	✓	Haejoon^{2nd}	None
72	13	December 19, 2016	6PM					✓	✓	✓	✓	Woojin^{2nd}	None
73	14	December 21, 2016	8PM					✓			✓	Yonghyun^{3rd}	68
74	14	December 22, 2016	8PM						✓	✓		Doha^{6th}	97
75	14	December 23, 2016	8PM					✓			✓	Seonghwan^{2nd}	66
76	14	December 24, 2016	2PM					✓	✓	✓	✓	None	
77	14	December 24, 2016	6PM					✓	✓	✓	✓	None	
78	14	December 25, 2016	2PM					✓	✓	✓	✓	None	
79	14	December 25, 2016	6PM					✓	✓	✓	✓	None	
80	15	December 28, 2016	8PM					✓	✓	✓	✓	None	
81	15	December 29, 2016	8PM						✓	✓		Yeontae^{3rd}	98
82	15	December 30, 2016	8PM					✓			✓	Jinsub^{5th}	117
83	15	December 31, 2016	2PM					✓	✓	✓	✓	Inpyo^{2nd}	None
84	15	December 31, 2016	6PM					✓	✓	✓	✓	Chani^{2nd}	None
85	15	December 31, 2016	10:30PM					✓	✓	✓	✓	H:Our^{1st}	None
86	16	January 5, 2017	8PM							✓	✓	None	
87	16	January 6, 2017	8PM					✓	✓			Inho^{3rd}	94
88	16	January 7, 2017	2PM							✓	✓	Jinseok^{7th}	186
89	16	January 7, 2017	6PM							✓	✓	Jinseok^{8th}	167
90	16	January 8, 2017	2PM					✓	✓			Minhwan^{2nd}	89
91	16	January 8, 2017	6PM							✓	✓	Hongin^{2nd}	103
92	17	January 12, 2017	8PM					✓	✓			None	
93	17	January 13, 2017	8PM							✓	✓	Yeontae^{4th}	91
94	17	January 14, 2017	2PM					✓	✓			Haejoon^{3rd}	121
95	17	January 14, 2017	6PM					✓	✓			Sunghyun^{3rd}	123
96	17	January 15, 2017	2PM							✓	✓	Jaemin^{3rd}	145
97	17	January 15, 2017	6PM					✓	✓			Doha^{7th}	180
98	18	January 19, 2017	8PM					✓			✓	None	
99	18	January 20, 2017	8PM						✓	✓		Hyunuk^{3rd}	88
100	18	January 21, 2017	2PM					✓	✓	✓	✓	None	
101	18	January 21, 2017	6PM					✓	✓	✓	✓	None	
102	18	January 22, 2017	2PM					✓			✓	Seonghwan^{3rd}	124
103	18	January 22, 2017	6PM						✓	✓		Inpyo^{3rd}	136
104	19	January 26, 2017	8PM						✓	✓		None	
105	19	January 27, 2017	2PM					✓			✓	Sungho^{2nd}	141
106	19	January 27, 2017	6PM						✓	✓		Jinseok^{9th}	113
107	20	February 3, 2017	8PM							✓	✓	Chani^{3rd}	102
108	20	February 4, 2017	2PM					✓	✓			Inho^{4th}	114
109	20	February 4, 2017	6PM					✓	✓			Louoon^{3rd}	94
110	20	February 5, 2017	2PM					✓	✓	✓	✓	Yonghyun^{4th}	None
111	20	February 5, 2017	6PM					✓	✓	✓	✓	Woojin^{3rd}	None
112	21	February 9, 2017	8PM						✓	✓		Yeontae^{5th}	61
113	21	February 10, 2017	8PM					✓			✓	Jinkyu^{4th}	172
114	21	February 11, 2017	2PM						✓	✓		Haejoon^{4th}	117
115	21	February 11, 2017	6PM						✓	✓		Doha^{8th}	174
116	21	February 12, 2017	2PM		✓							None	
117	21	February 12, 2017	6PM			✓						None	
118	22	February 14, 2017	8PM					✓	✓	✓	✓	Hocheol^{2nd}	None
119	22	February 16, 2017	8PM							✓	✓	Yonghyun^{5th}	125
120	22	February 17, 2017	8PM					✓	✓			Changmin^{3rd}	83
121	22	February 18, 2017	2PM							✓	✓	Youngdoo^{5th}	157
122	22	February 18, 2017	6PM							✓	✓	Jinsub^{6th}	95
123	22	February 19, 2017	2PM	✓								None	
124	22	February 19, 2017	6PM				✓					None	
125	23	February 23, 2017	8PM					✓	✓			Doha^{9th}	108
126	23	February 24, 2017	8PM							✓	✓	Chani^{4th}	110
127	23	February 25, 2017	2PM					✓	✓			Sungho^{3rd}	90
128	23	February 25, 2017	6PM					✓	✓			Inho^{5th}	94
129	23	February 26, 2017	2PM							✓	✓	Yeontae^{6th}	154
130	23	February 26, 2017	6PM							✓	✓	Sunghyun^{4th}	87
131	24	March 1, 2017	2PM	✓			✓					Jinseok^{10th}	147
132	24	March 1, 2017	6PM		✓	✓						Jinsub^{7th}	95
133	25	March 9, 2017	8PM	✓	✓							Seonghwan^{4th}	96
134	25	March 10, 2017	8PM	✓	✓							Yeontae^{7th}	180
135	25	March 11, 2017	2PM						✓	✓		Haejoon^{5th}	87
136	25	March 11, 2017	6PM					✓	✓			Doha^{10th}	122
137	25	March 12, 2017	2PM					✓			✓	Youngdoo^{6th}	141
138	25	March 12, 2017	6PM							✓	✓	Jinseok^{11th}	149
139	26	March 14, 2017	8PM					✓	✓	✓	✓	Jaehyun^{2nd}	None
140	26	March 16, 2017	8PM	✓	✓							Sunghyun^{5th}	131
141	26	March 17, 2017	8PM			✓	✓					Yonghyun^{6th}	96
142	26	March 18, 2017	2PM		✓	✓						Jinsub^{8th}	140
143	26	March 18, 2017	6PM	✓			✓					Louoon^{4th}	126
144	26	March 19, 2017	2PM	✓	✓	✓	✓					San^{3rd}	None
145	26	March 19, 2017	6PM	✓	✓	✓	✓					Isaac^{4th}	None

Note

BOYS24 LIVE Schedule & MVP (Seoul, March 24, 2017 – August 6, 2017)

No.	Week	Date	Time	Performers					MVP	MVP Votes
No.	Week	Date	Time	Unit Black	Shuffle Unit (Note: Unit Line-Up: Unit White: Doha, Youngdoo, Jinseok, Louoon, Isaac, Jihyeong, San; Unit Red: Sungho, Hyunuk, Jinkyu, Chani, Haejoon, Hongin, Yongkwon; Unit Blue: Inho, Yonghyun, Minhwan, Inpyo, Jaemin, Changmin, Hocheol; Unit Purple: Sunghyun, Yeontae, Seonghwan, Jaehyun, Jinsub, Woojin)				MVP	MVP Votes
No.	Week	Date	Time	Unit Black	Unit White	Unit Red	Unit Blue	Unit Purple	MVP	MVP Votes
146	27	March 24, 2017	8PM			✓	✓		Hocheol^{3rd}	103
147	27	March 25, 2017	2PM			✓	✓		Inho^{6th}	148
148	27	March 25, 2017	6PM			✓	✓		Inpyo^{4th}	120
149	27	March 26, 2017	2PM		✓			✓	Jihyeong^{3rd}	135
150	27	March 26, 2017	6PM		✓			✓	Doha^{11th}	216
151	28	March 30, 2017	8PM		✓			✓	Sunghyun^{6th}	51
152	28	March 31, 2017	8PM			✓	✓		Changmin^{4th}	112
153	28	April 1, 2017	2PM		✓			✓	Youngdoo^{7th}	184
154	28	April 1, 2017	6PM		✓			✓	Youngdoo^{8th}	148
155	28	April 2, 2017	2PM			✓	✓		Minhwan^{3rd}	132
156	28	April 2, 2017	6PM			✓	✓		Hyunuk^{4th}	100
157	29	April 5, 2017	8PM		✓			✓	San^{4th}	—N/a
158	29	April 6, 2017	8PM			✓	✓		Yongkwon^{3rd}	100
159	29	April 7, 2017	8PM		✓			✓	Jinsub^{9th}	100
160	29	April 8, 2017	2PM			✓	✓		Yonghyun^{7th}	126
161	29	April 8, 2017	6PM			✓	✓		Chani^{5th}	152
162	29	April 9, 2017	2PM		✓			✓	Yeontae^{8th}	116
163	29	April 9, 2017	6PM		✓			✓	Jinseok^{12th}	165
164	30	April 14, 2017	8PM			✓	✓		Inpyo^{5th}	96
165	30	April 15, 2017	2PM			✓	✓		Inho^{7th}	84
166	30	April 15, 2017	6PM			✓	✓		Changmin^{5th}	96
167	30	April 16, 2017	2PM		✓			✓	Sunghyun^{7th}	79
168	31	April 21, 2017	8PM			✓	✓		Hocheol^{4th}	100
169	31	April 22, 2017	6PM		✓			✓	Louoon^{5th}	73
170	31	April 23, 2017	2PM		✓			✓	Jinsub^{10th}	112
171	31	April 23, 2017	6PM		✓			✓	Isaac^{5th}	122
172	32	April 27, 2017	8PM		✓			✓	Woojin^{4th}	89
173	32	April 28, 2017	8PM		✓			✓	Seonghwan^{5th}	88
174	32	April 29, 2017	2PM			✓	✓		Haejoon^{6th}	67
175	32	April 29, 2017	6PM			✓	✓		Minhwan^{4th}	109
176	32	April 30, 2017	2PM		✓			✓	Yeontae^{9th}	110
177	32	April 30, 2017	6PM		✓			✓	Jinsub^{11th}	27
178	33	May 3, 2017	2PM		✓			✓	Jinseok^{13th}	169
179	33	May 3, 2017	6PM			✓	✓		Jaemin^{4th}	95
180	33	May 5, 2017	2PM		✓			✓	Youngdoo^{9th}	154
181	33	May 5, 2017	6PM			✓	✓		Yonghyun^{8th}	134
182	33	May 6, 2017	2PM	✓					None	
183	33	May 6, 2017	6PM	✓					None	
184	33	May 7, 2017	2PM		✓	✓	✓	✓	Isaac^{6th} (Note: Leaders' choice)	None
185	33	May 7, 2017	6PM		✓	✓	✓	✓	Hongin^{3rd}	None
186	34	May 11, 2017	8PM			✓	✓		Hongin^{4th}	97
187	34	May 12, 2017	8PM		✓			✓	Jaehyun^{3rd}	89
188	34	May 13, 2017	2PM			✓	✓		Changmin^{6th}	107
189	34	May 13, 2017	6PM			✓	✓		Sungho^{4th}	34
190	34	May 14, 2017	2PM		✓			✓	Doha^{12th}	203
191	34	May 14, 2017	6PM			✓	✓		Chani^{6th}	97
192	35	May 17, 2017	8PM			✓	✓		Haejoon^{7th}	111
193	35	May 18, 2017	8PM		✓			✓	San^{5th}	71
194	35	May 19, 2017	8PM			✓	✓		Jinkyu^{5th}	106
195	35	May 20, 2017	2PM		✓			✓	Seonghwan^{5th}	74
196	35	May 20, 2017	6PM		✓			✓	Jinsub^{12th}	109
197	35	May 21, 2017	2PM			✓	✓		Yongkwon^{4th}	108
198	36	May 24, 2017	8PM		✓			✓	Doha^{13th}	22
199	36	May 25, 2017	8PM			✓	✓		Hocheol^{5th}	82
200	36	May 26, 2017	8PM		✓			✓	Woojin^{5th}	89
201	36	May 27, 2017	2PM			✓	✓		Sungho^{5th}	89
202	36	May 27, 2017	6PM			✓	✓		Inpyo^{6th}	117
203	36	May 28, 2017	2PM		✓			✓	Louoon^{6th}	126
204	37	June 1, 2017	8PM		✓			✓	Doha^{14th}	99
205	37	June 2, 2017	8PM			✓	✓		Jaemin^{5th}	111
206	37	June 3, 2017	2PM		✓			✓	Yeontae^{10th}	155
207	37	June 3, 2017	6PM		✓			✓	Jinsub^{13th}	110
208	37	June 4, 2017	2PM	✓					None	
209	37	June 4, 2017	6PM	✓					None	
210	38	June 15, 2017	8PM			✓	✓		Chani^{7th}	112
211	38	June 16, 2017	8PM		✓			✓	Louoon^{7th}	133
212	38	June 17, 2017	2PM			✓	✓		Minhwan^{5th}	130
213	38	June 17, 2017	6PM		✓			✓	Woojin^{6th}	177
214	38	June 18, 2017	2PM			✓	✓		Inho^{8th}	130
215	38	June 18, 2017	6PM			✓	✓		Inpyo^{7th}	146
216	39	June 22, 2017	8PM			✓	✓		Haejoon^{8th}	115
217	39	June 23, 2017	8PM		✓			✓	Sunghyun^{8th}	98
218	39	June 24, 2017	2PM			✓	✓		Yonghyun^{9th}	95
219	39	June 24, 2017	6PM			✓	✓		Changmin^{7th}	123
220	39	June 25, 2017	2PM		✓			✓	Doha^{15th}	108
221	39	June 25, 2017	6PM		✓			✓	Jinseok^{14th}	163
222	40	June 29, 2017	8PM		✓			✓	Youngdoo^{10th}	96
223	40	June 30, 2017	8PM		✓			✓	Seonghwan^{7th}	188
224	40	July 1, 2017	2PM			✓	✓		Hyunuk^{5th}	120
225	40	July 1, 2017	6PM			✓	✓		Hocheol^{6th}	104
226	40	July 2, 2017	2PM		✓	✓	✓	✓	Jinkyu^{6th}	None
227	40	July 2, 2017	6PM		✓	✓	✓	✓	Isaac^{7th}	None
228	41	July 6, 2017	8PM		✓			✓	Yeontae^{11th}	183
229	41	July 7, 2017	8PM			✓	✓		Jinkyu^{7th}	114
230	41	July 8, 2017	2PM			✓	✓		Hongin^{5th}	118
231	41	July 8, 2017	6PM			✓	✓		Inho^{9th}	147
232	41	July 9, 2017	2PM		✓			✓	Jihyeong^{4th}	129
233	41	July 9, 2017	6PM		✓			✓	Jinseok^{15th}	215
234	42	July 12, 2017	8PM		✓				None	
235	42	July 13, 2017	8PM					✓	None	
236	42	July 14, 2017	8PM			✓	✓		Jaemin^{6th}	122
237	42	July 15, 2017	2PM		✓			✓	Isaac^{8th}	190
238	42	July 15, 2017	6PM		✓			✓	Sunghyun^{9th}	171
239	42	July 16, 2017	2PM			✓	✓		Sungho^{6th}	176
240	42	July 16, 2017	6PM			✓	✓		Hyunuk^{6th}	167
241	43	July 19, 2017	8PM				✓		None	
242	43	July 20, 2017	8PM			✓			None	
243	43	July 21, 2017	8PM		✓			✓	San^{6th}	147
244	43	July 22, 2017	2PM			✓	✓		Yonghyun^{10th}	167
245	43	July 22, 2017	6PM			✓	✓		Changmin^{8th}	201
246	43	July 23, 2017	2PM		✓			✓	Youngdoo^{11th}	190
247	43	July 23, 2017	6PM		✓			✓	Jaehyun^{4th}	181
	44			Original Unit Concert (See Table Below)						
254	45	August 2, 2017	8PM		✓			✓	Doha^{16th}	191
255	45	August 3, 2017	8PM			✓	✓		Hocheol^{7th}	179
256	45	August 4, 2017	8PM		✓			✓	Jinsub^{14th}	198
257	45	August 5, 2017	2PM			✓	✓		Haejoon^{9th}	188
258	45	August 5, 2017	6PM			✓	✓		Yongkwon^{5th}	166
259	45	August 6, 2017	2PM		✓	✓	✓	✓	H:our^{2nd}	None
260	45	August 6, 2017	6PM		✓	✓	✓	✓	None	

No.	Week	Date	Time	Performers				MVP	MVP Votes
No.	Week	Date	Time	Unit (Note: Unit Line-Up: Unit Yellow: Yeontae, Louoon, Seonghwan, Jinseok, Hongin, Jaemin, Changmin; Unit White: Doha, Youngdoo, Inho, Jaehyun, Haejoon, Jinsub, Sunghyun; Unit Green: Sungho, Jihyeong, Chani, Minhwan, Inpyo, San, Hocheol; Unit Sky: Jinkyu, Hyunuk, Isaac, Yongkwon, Yonghyun, Woojin)				MVP	MVP Votes
No.	Week	Date	Time	Yellow	White	Green	Sky	MVP	MVP Votes
248	44	July 27, 2017	8PM		✓	✓		Minhwan^{6th}	185
249	44	July 28, 2017	8PM	✓			✓	Woojin^{7th}	160
250	44	July 29, 2017	2PM		✓	✓		Chani^{8th}	190
251	44	July 29, 2017	6PM		✓	✓		Inpyo^{8th}	206
252	44	July 30, 2017	2PM	✓			✓	Seonghwan^{8th}	228
253	44	July 30, 2017	6PM	✓			✓	Louoon^{8th}	226

=== Set List ===
BOYS24 LIVE Set List
- "E"
- "YOLO"
- "Boom"
- "BOP"
- "Candy Shop"
- "하루"
- "Champ"
- "I Am"
- "Starlight"
- "NMDR"
- "Love Operator"
- "Game Boy"
- "Time Leap"
- "Tomorrow"
- MVP Stage
- "Rising Star"
- "24"
BOYS24 The 1st Semi-Final Set List

On Air

- "E"
- "Boom"
- "Game Boy"
- "Into The New World"
- "Nobody"
- "Starlight"
- "YOLO"
- "Rising Star"
- "Tomorrow"

Off Air

- "Time Leap"
- "BOP"
- "NMDR"
- "Candy Shop"
- "24"
BOYS24 The Final Set List
- "Rising Star"
- "Steal Your Heart"
- "NMDR"
- "Boom"
- "Starlight"
- "Chandelier" (Special Stage by Hongin)
- "I'm in Love" & "Mr. Steal Your Girl" (Special Stage by Hyunuk)
- "YOLO"
- "BOP"
- "Candy Shop"
- "Time Leap"
- "Love Operator"
- "Tomorrow"

== Other activities ==
=== Endorsements ===
Year	Product	Notes
2016	Booto	
2016	새싹보리	Unit Yellow (Louoon, Seonghwan, Hongin, Jaemin, Jinseok, and Changmin)

=== Overseas Fan Meeting and Showcase ===
Date	City	Title	Performers	Venue
September 10, 2016	Hong Kong	Plaza Hollywood X BOYS24 Fan Meeting in Hong Kong	Unit Yellow and Unit Sky (Note: Line-Up: Unit Yellow: Yeontae, Louoon, Seonghwan, Jinseok, Hongin, Jaemin, Changmin; Unit Sky: Jinkyu, Hyunuk, Isaac, Yongkwon, Yonghyun, Woojin, Hwayoung)	Plaza Hollywood
December 3, 2016	Tokyo, Japan	少年24 JAPAN OFFICIAL FANCLUB EVENT～1st H:Our Party～	Unit Yellow and Unit White (Note: Line-Up: Unit Yellow: Yeontae, Louoon, Seonghwan, Jinseok, Hongin, Jaemin, Changmin; Unit White: Doha, Youngdoo, Inho, Jaehyun, Haejoon, Jinsub, Sunghyun)	Ebisu Garden Place
June 10, 2017	Taipei, Taiwan	BOYS24 1ST SHOWCASE TOUR IN TAIPEI	Unit Black (Note: Line-Up: Doha, Youngdoo, Yeontae, Inho, Hyunuk, Jinseok, Sunghyun, Yonghyun)	ATT Show Box

== Awards and nominations ==
Year	Recipient	Award	Category	Result
2016	BOYS24	International K-Music Awards	Best Newcomer	Nominated
