= P.O.P (group) =

South Korean girl group

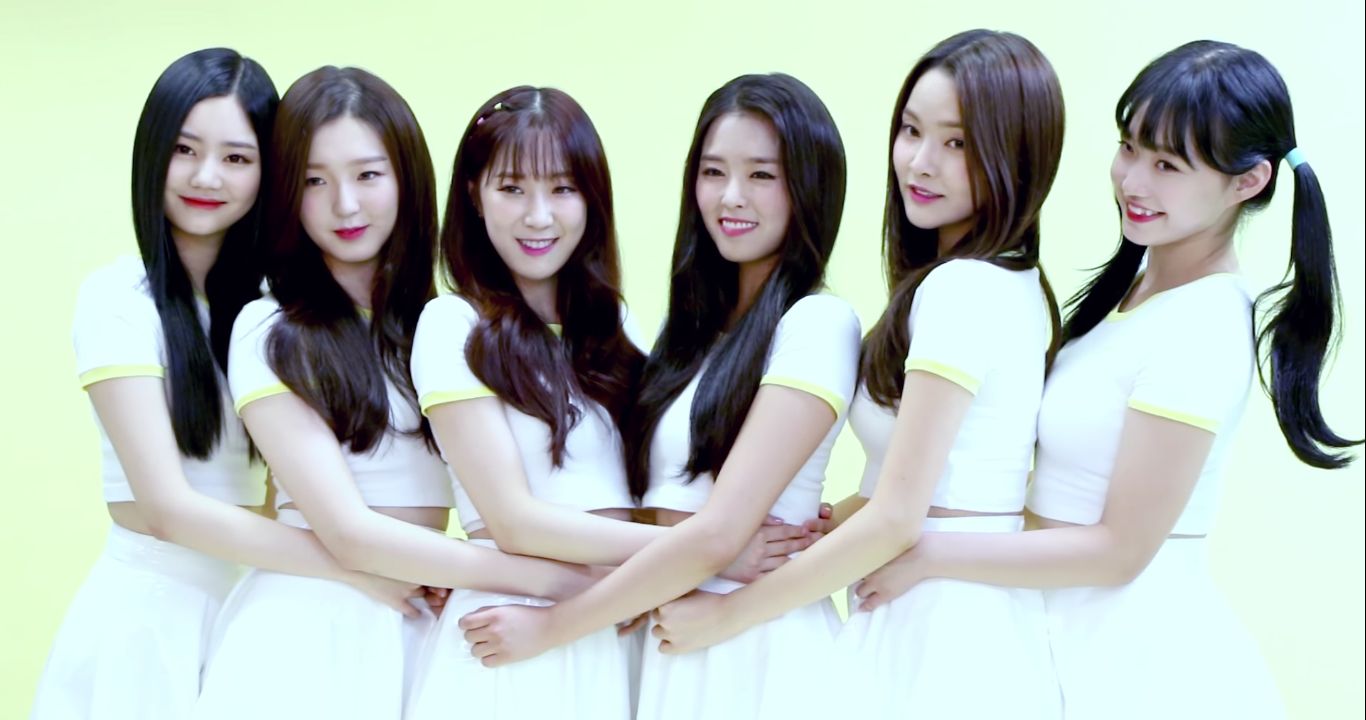
- P.O.P in August 2017

Background information
- Also known as: Puzzle of Pop
- Origin: Seoul, South Korea
- Genres: K-pop
- Years active: 2017–2018
- Labels: DWM Entertainment
- Past members: Ahyung; Miso; Seol; Haeri; Yeonjoo; Yeonha

P.O.P (Korean: 피오피; Abbreviation for: Puzzle Of POP; stylized as POP) was a South Korean girl group formed by DWM Entertainment in 2017. The group debuted on July 26, 2017, with the EP Puzzle Of POP.

== History ==
=== 2017: Debut with Puzzle of POP and Yeonha's departure ===
Before debuting, all members of P.O.P are trained under RBW Entertainment. On July 26, 2017, they debuted with the first EP Puzzle Of P.O.P along with title track Catch You under DWM Entertainment.

On August 1, it was revealed by DWM Entertainment that Yeonha would be taking a break from group activities due to her busy schedule and was in a poor condition. Yeonha, at the time, was being tested for myasthenia gravis. Later on October 24, it was revealed by Ministry Health officials that Yeonha had terminated her contract with DWM Entertainment and left the group due to her health. P.O.P had been preparing for their comeback after wrapping up their debut activities. The group will continue as a five membered group. However, the group's comeback indefinitely postponed for unknown reasons.

P.O.P quietly disbanded in May 2018 due to inactivity.

== Members ==
=== Former ===
- Ahyung (Hangul: 아형)
- Miso (미소)
- Seol (설)
- Haeri (해리)
- Yeonjoo (연주)
- Yeonha (연하)

== Discography ==
=== Extended plays ===
Title	Album details	Peak chart positions	Sales
Title	Album details	KOR	Sales
Puzzle Of POP	Released: July 26, 2017; Label: DWM Entertainment, LOEN Entertainment; Formats: CD, digital download; Track listing: 1. START 161516; 2. Catch You (애타게 GET하게); 3. Secret Diary (비밀일기); 4. Step by Step (한 걸음씩 갇기); 5. YIP PEE; 6. Memory	25	KOR: 859+

=== Singles ===
Title	Year	Album
"Catch You" (애타게 GET하게)	2017	Puzzle Of POP
