= Ji-won =

- Hangul: 지원
- RR: Jiwon
- MR: Chiwŏn
- IPA: [tɕiwʌn]

Ji-won, also spelled Jee-won, is a Korean given name.

People with this name include:

== Entertainers ==
- Do Ji-won (born 1968), South Korean actress
- Ye Ji-won (born 1973), South Korean actress
- Uhm Ji-won (born 1977), South Korean actress
- Eun Ji-won (born 1978), South Korean rapper
- Ha Ji-won (born Jeon Hae-rim, 1978), South Korean actress
- Jang Ji-won (born 1979), South Korean taekwondo practitioner
- Wang Ji-won (born 1988), South Korean actress and ballet dancer
- Yang Ji-won (born 1988), South Korean singer and actress
- Kim Ji-won (born 1992), South Korean actress
- Zior Park (born Park Ji-won, 1994), South Korean rapper
- Bobby (born Kim Ji-won, 1995), South Korean rapper, member of boy band iKon
- ZZONE (born Kim Ji-won, 1999), also known as Jeewon, South Korean singer and guitarist, member of Latency and former member of Good Day and Cignature
- Liz (born Kim Ji-won, 2004), South Korean singer, member of Ive

== Sportspeople ==
- Kim Ji-won (boxer) (born 1959), South Korean boxer
- Woo Ji-won (born 1973), South Korean basketball player
- Jang Ji-won (born 1979), South Korean taekwondo practitioner
- Han Ji-won (born 1994), South Korean football player
- Seo Jee-won (born 1994), South Korean freestyle skier
- Kim Ji-won (badminton) (born 1995), South Korean badminton player

== Others ==
- Pak Chiwŏn (philosopher), Joseon Dynasty philosopher
- Park Ji-weon (born 1934), South Korean politician
- Park Jie-won (born 1942), South Korean politician
- Kim Chi-won (1943–2013), South Korean writer
- Yang Ji-won (academic) (born 1949), South Korean chemistry professor
- Vittoria Yeo (born Yeo Ji-won, 1980), South Korean operatic soprano

== See also ==
- List of Korean given names
