= Landon Sears =

American singer (born 1997)

- Born: January 30, 1997 (age 29); U.S.
- Origin: Nashville, Tennessee, U.S.
- Genres: Hip-hop; R&B; K-pop
- Occupations: Singer; rapper; songwriter; musician; record producer
- Instruments: violin; Logic Pro
- Years active: 2016–present
- Awards: Platinum Record (Kang Daniel's Yellow); Platinum Record (NCT Dream's Candy)

Landon Sears (born January 30, 1997) is an American singer, rapper, songwriter, musician, and producer raised in Danville, Kentucky, and based out of Nashville, Tennessee. He is most recognized for his work on Bren Joy's "Sweet" in 2019, which has accumulated over 20 million streams on Spotify, as of Dec 1, 2024. Sears has additionally gained recognition through his work as a songwriter and composer for South Korean acts such as NCT 127, Kang Daniel, CIX, NCT Dream and NCT DoJaeJung. NCT DoJaeJung's "Perfume", co-written by Sears, peaked at number 4 on the South Korean single charts. Sears's credits on Kang Daniel's EP, Yellow earned him his first platinum record, with NCT Dream's EP, Candy, delivering his second, reaching number 1 on Circle Chart and amassing sales of 1,395,187 copies by December 2022. His work on NCT 127's "Walk" secured Sears a second number 1 in South Korea, with the lead single's eponymous album going 3× Platinum. His work with notable contemporary American artists includes Young Buck, Jason Derulo, Bubba Sparkxxx, Leven Kali, Innanet James, Felly, Rexx Life Raj, and Connor Stankevich (better known as Conswank) of 99 Neighbors. He specializes in the genres of hip-hop and R&B, with his style being self-described as "harmony rap".

== Early life and career ==
Initially a violinist, he became fascinated with hip-hop at a young age, attributing his time spent navigating iTunes & YouTube to developing his taste in music. He would overdub recordings of him playing violin onto instrumentals of well-known songs, burn them to CDs and sell them at school. At the age of 13, he began learning to rap and produce using GarageBand, attempting to copy other artists he found on DatPiff, then moving onto Logic Pro once he began attending high school. He eventually moved from his hometown of Danville, Kentucky to Nashville, Tennessee to attend Belmont University and find a more fitting music scene. He began posting to online music platforms such as SoundCloud and Bandcamp before releasing his first single, "Bonnie & Clyde", to music streaming services via DistroKid on December 5, 2016.

== Discography ==
Landon Sears has released three independent albums, Autumn Icarus which was released on 19 December 2017, 88.1, released on 30 January 2021, and Call Collect X, released on 28 October 2022.

=== Albums ===
List of Studio albums
Title	Album details
Autumn Icarus	Released: December 19, 2017; Label: Landon Sears (self-released); Format: Digital download
88.1	Released: January 30, 2021; Label: Engine House Records; Format: Digital download
Call Collect X	Released: October 28, 2022; Label: GoodCopBadCop LLC; Format: Digital download
All Men Lie	Released: August 23, 2024; Label: GoodCopBadCop LLC; Format: Digital download
To Hide What's Real	Released: January 31, 2025; Label: GoodCopBadCop LLC; Format: Digital download

=== Extended plays ===
List of Extended plays
Title	Extended play details
Call Collect, Vol.1	Released: March 9, 2018; Label: Landon Sears; Format: Digital download
Call Collect, Vol.2	Released: April 27, 2018; Label: Landon Sears; Format: Digital download
Call Collect, Vol.3	Released: June 29, 2018; Label: Landon Sears; Format: Digital download
Call Collect, Vol.4	Released: September 14, 2018; Label: LAZYIRENE; Format: Digital download
Call Collect, Vol.5	Released: December 14, 2018; Label: LAZYIRENE; Format: Digital download
Call Collect 6	Released: April 23, 2021; Label: Engine House Records; Format: Digital download
Call Collect 7	Released: June 18, 2021; Label: GoodCopBadCop LLC; Format: Digital download
Call Collect 8	Released: September 3, 2021; Label: GoodCopBadCop LLC; Format: Digital download
Call Collect 9	Released: June 15, 2022; Label: GoodCopBadCop LLC; Format: Digital download

=== Singles ===
==== As lead artist ====
List of singles as lead artist
Title	Year	Album / EP
"Bonnie & Clyde"	2016	Non-album singles
"Backwoods & Lipstick"	2017	Non-album singles
"Cuba Libre"	2017	Non-album singles
"Blueberry Cadillac"	2017	Non-album singles
"Moet on the Balcony"	2017	Non-album singles
"She Wants Those Eyes"	2017	Non-album singles
"Wake Up"	2017	Non-album singles
"Nobody Awake"	2017	Autumn Icarus
"Show My Work"	2018	Call Collect, Vol.3
"Sabrina Claudio"	2018	Call Collect, Vol.4
"Oxygen"	2019	Non-album singles
"Broadcast" (featuring Estef)	2019	Non-album singles
"Half an Hour"	2019	Non-album singles
"Kick It / Eucalyptus"	2019	Non-album singles
"Slide"	2019	Non-album singles
"Watch"	2020	Non-album singles
"TI-83"	2020	Non-album singles
"Sunday"	2020	Non-album singles
"Gwen Stacy"	2020	Non-album singles
"Walking Distance"	2020	Non-album singles
"Amaretto"	2020	Non-album singles
"Next Time We're Flying" (featuring Bren Joy)	2020	88.1
"Money" (Talia Stewart & Landon Sears)	2021	Keep Coming Back!
"Prada" (Danny Polo, Landon Sears, & CUBE)	2021	Non-album singles
"Against Me" (featuring Claire Maisto)	2022	Non-album singles
"Rotten Apple"	2022	Non-album singles
"Old School" (Valid Point. & Landon Sears)	2022	Non-album singles
"No Matter" (Chase Murphy & Landon Sears)	2022	Non-album singles
"Solid"	2022	Non-album singles
"Under My Skin" (Chris Scalco & Landon Sears)	2022	Boy Bands & Boom Bap
"Shut Me Up"	2022	Call Collect X
"Incentivized" (Landon Sears & Innanet James)	2023	To Hide What's Real
"Bat Ur Eyes"	2023	Non-album single
"Passport Luvr"	2023	To Hide What's Real
"Pool Day" (Landon Sears & DJ Grumble)	2023	All Men Lie
"I Wanna" (Landon Sears, Alex Slay, Chase Williams)	2023	Non-album single
"When We Kiss" (Landon Sears & Alex Slay)	2024	To Hide What's Real
"Exfoliate" (Landon Sears, Rexx Life Raj, Chase Murphy)	2024	All Men Lie
"Chrome On The Wheels" (Landon Sears, Bubba Sparxxx, Young Buck)	2024	All Men Lie
"Lets Be Alone" (Chase Williams, Landon Sears, Cadillac Dale)	2024	TBA

==== As a featured artist ====
List of singles as a featured artist
Title	Year	Artist	Album
"Walk Around"	2017	C-Trox	Non-album singles
"Cabernet"	2017	Gretchen	Non-album singles
"Speed Up"	2018	Pink Slip	Project Pink
"Sweet"	2019	Bren Joy	Non-album singles
"Goin' Up (Remix)"	2020	Owen Mack	Non-album singles
"Skittles"	2020	Csztr	Non-album singles
"Higher"	2020	Kirk Tegtmeier	Non-album singles
"Reroute"	2022	Chase Williams	Downtempo
"Corner of My Eye"	2022	Dizzy Spins	False Permanence
"So Rich"	2022	Sara Sturm	Non-album singles
"Mid-October"	2022	Ryan Tucker	Non-album singles
"I've Been"	2023	J. Seuss	If You Really Wanna Know
"Miss U More"	2023	Curv Moon	Non-album single
"2 Artists"	2024	Danny Polo	Kahlo
"Corner of My Eye (Radio Edit)"	2024	Dizzy Spins	Non-album singles
"Intuition (Remix)"	2024	Arlana	Non-album singles
"The City"	2024	Soul Tapes	The Soul Tapes

== Production and songwriting credits ==
List of songs co-written and co-produced by Sears for other artists.
Title	Year	Artist	Album	credits
"Imagine"	2019	CIX	Hello Chapter 1: Hello Stranger	Co-writer
"Black Out"	2019	CIX	Hello Chapter 2: Hello, Strange Place	Co-writer
"Revival"	2020	CIX	Pinky Swear	Co-writer
"All Gone" (featuring The Hive)	2020	Lackhoney	Non-album single	Co-writer, co-producer
"How We Live" (featuring Sokodomo)	2022	Kang Daniel	The Story	Co-writer
"Tangerine Love (Favorite)"	2022	NCT Dream	Candy	Co-writer
"When Love Sucks" (featuring Dido)	2023	Jason Derluo	Nu King	Violinist, string arranger
"Body Count"	2023	Jason Derluo	Nu King	Co-writer
"Atrocity's Building"	2024	Dizzy Spins	Non-album single	Engineer
"Walk"	2024	NCT 127	Walk	Co-writer
"Thrill Of The Risk"	2024	Dizzy Spins	All Titles Temporary	Co-writer, spoken word
