= Hello Chapter 3: Hello, Strange Time =

2020 EP by CIX

EP by CIX
- Released: October 27, 2020
- Recorded: 2020
- Genre: K-pop
- Length: 17:20
- Language: Korean
- Label: C9

CIX chronology
Hello Chapter 2: Hello, Strange Place (2019)	Hello Chapter 3: Hello, Strange Time (2020)	Hello Chapter Ø: Hello, Strange Dream (2021)

Singles from Hello Chapter 3: Hello, Strange Time
- 1. "Jungle" Released: October 27, 2020

Hello Chapter 3: Hello, Strange Time is the third extended play by South Korean boy group CIX. It was released on October 27, 2020 by C9 Entertainment. The album consists of five tracks, including the title track, "Jungle".

== Background, release and promotion ==
On May 31, 2020, CIX announced the release of their third extended play Hello Chapter 3: Hello, Strange Time, along with a comeback schedule containing the dates of sequential teasers following up to the release of the album release set on June 30, 2020. On June 3, the group photo teaser for the album was released. From June 8 to June 12, individual teaser photos of the band members were released. On June 13, the music video teaser of the lead single, "Jungle" was released. From June 15 to June 19, individual teaser videos of the band members were released.

On June 24, 2020, CIX's company, C9 entertainment, gave an official statement that a group member, Bae Jinyoung had injured his ankle during a practice session. It was announced, due to his injury the release and promotions of the album will be postponed.

On October 15, 2020, CIX released the schedule of the new comeback date for their third extended play. On October 19, the second music video teaser was released. On October 26, the group released a performance video teaser. On October 27, the album and an accompanying music video for the lead single, "Jungle" was released.

== Track listing ==
No.	Title	Lyrics	Music	Arrangement	Length
1.	"Move My Body"	danke	Anthony Russo, Jackson Morgan, Kyle Buckley, Anthony Pave, MZMC, Jay Kim	Pink Slip, Inverness	3:16
2.	"Jungle"	danke	Jackson Morgan, Mitchell Rose, Kaelyn Behr, MZMC, Jay Kim	Styalz Fuego	3:48
3.	"Change Me"	Joa, JQ	Anthony Russo, Kaelyn Behr, MZMC, Jay Kim	Styalz Fuego	3:38
4.	"Switch It Up"	JQ, Kim Eungju, Park Yoo Rim	Jackson Morgan, Anthony Pavel, Johnathan Hoskins, MZMC, Jay Kim	Johnathan Hoskins	3:15
5.	"Rebel"	danke	Jackson Morgan, Mitchell Rose, Kaelyn Behr, Anthony Russo, MZMC, Jay Kim	Styalz Fuego	3:23
Total length:					17:20

== Charts ==
Chart (2020)	Peak position
South Korean Albums (Gaon)	6

== Release history ==
Country	Date	Format	Label
Various	October 27, 2020	CD; digital download; streaming	C9 Entertainment
South Korea	October 27, 2020	CD; digital download; streaming	C9 Entertainment
