= Irris =

South Korean girl group

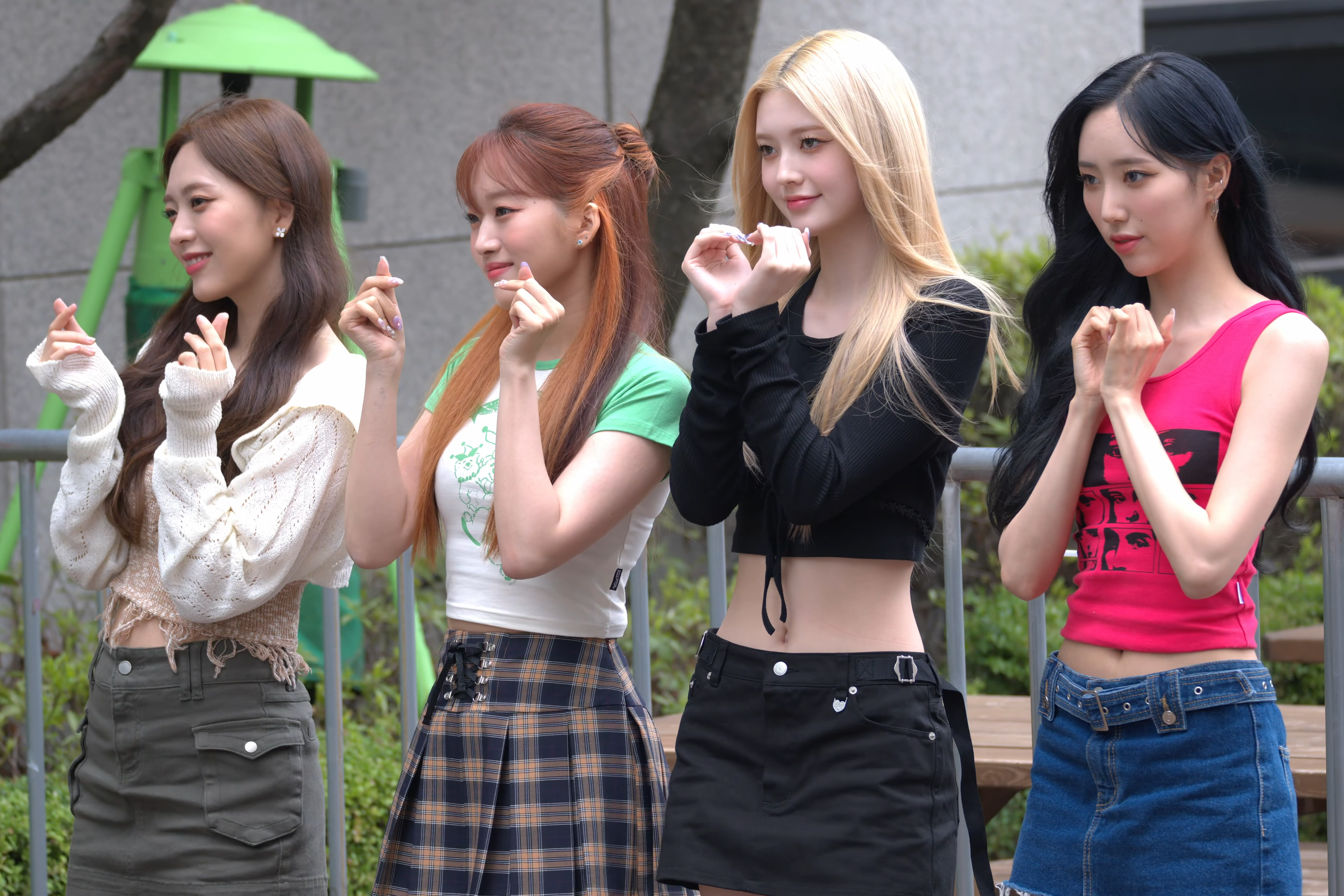
- Irris in July 2022; From left to right: I.L., Yunseul, Nina, and Liv

Background information
- Origin: Seoul, South Korea
- Genres: K-pop; dance; pop; urban
- Years active: 2022
- Labels: Justice; Mellow
- Past members: I.L.; Liv; Yunseul; Nina

IRRIS (/ˈaɪərɪs/; Korean: 아이리스; RR: Airiseu; also stylized as IЯRIS) was a South Korean girl group formed and managed by Justice Records and Mellow Entertainment. The group consists of four members: I.L., Liv, Yunseul, and Nina. The group made their debut on July 6, 2022, with the release of their first extended play Wanna Know.

From December 31, 2022 to January 1, 2023, the group officially split into two members respectively after the departure of two members.

== Name ==
The group's name, Irris is a double entendre, with its two abbreviations being "I is the Reflection of Reality and IllusionS" and "I tRuely Realized that I can be all colorS". The group name is also inspired by the Greek mythology Iris, the goddess of the Rainbow. They said that the name contains the aspiration to emit infinite light based on the symbol of connection with the soul, freedom and liberation.

== History ==
=== 2017–2022: Pre-debut activities ===
I.L., Liv and Yunseul debuted as members of Good Day under C9 Entertainment in 2017 as Cherry, Genie and Nayoon, where they disbanded in 2019 after two years of hiatus. After the disbandment all the members went their separate ways with five previous members debuting as Cignature under C9. The aforementioned then went on to debut as Redsquare under About Entertainment in 2020 as Green, ChaeA and Ari. The group then transferred to Iconic Music and Entertainment, a subsidiary of Taewon Entertainment after a year of hiatus. The group was later rebranded along with the label in 2022 after another year of hiatus and two members leaving. Both Good Day and Redsquare disbanded after one release. I.L. previously starred on the South Korean drama Idol: The Coup where she starred alongside Exy of WJSN, Hani of EXID and more.

=== 2022–present: Introduction and debut with Wanna Know ===
On June 13, 2022, Justice Records, a newly launched music division of Taewon Entertainment and Mellow Entertainment announced that they would be debuting a new girl group. The members were revealed from June 14 to 17, starting with I.L. and later on with Nina, Yunseul and Liv. Promotions for the debut started on June 21, 2022, through Justice Records and Mellow Entertainment, and Irris made their official debut on July 6, 2022, with the release of their debut EP Wanna Know, simultaneously with its lead single of the same name.

On October 30, 2022, Justice Records announced in an official statement that in order to participate in the national mourning period, the release of Irris' new single 'Stay W!th Me', scheduled for midnight on October 31, was postponed in the aftermath of the Seoul Halloween crowd crush.

== Last known line-up ==
=== Members during separation ===
- I.L. (아이엘) – leader
- Liv (리브) – dancer, rapper

=== Past members ===
- Yunseul (윤슬) – vocalist
- Nina (니나) – dancer

== Discography ==
=== Extended plays ===
List of extended plays, showing selected details, selected chart positions, and sales figures
Title	Details	Peak chart positions	Sales
Title	Details	KOR	Sales
Wanna Know	Released: July 6, 2022; Label: Justice Records, Mellow Entertainment, Genie Music; Formats: CD, digital download, streaming; Track listing: 1. "Wanna Know"; 2. "Bye Bye"; 3. "Stay With Me"; 4. "Wanna Know" (instrumental)	54	KOR: 1,856

=== Singles ===
List of singles, showing year released, and name of the album
Title	Year	Album
"Wanna Know"	2022	Wanna Know

== Videography ==
=== Music videos ===
Title	Year	Director(s)	Length	Ref.
"Wanna Know"	2022	Lee Ki-baek; Kim Joo-sun; Kim Ji-young; (BOLD)	3:01	
"Stay With Me"	2022	Lee Ki-baek; Kim Joo-sun; Kim Ji-young; (BOLD)	3:18	
"Bye Bye"	2022	Lee Ki-baek; Kim Joo-sun; Kim Ji-young; (BOLD)	3:45	
