= OK Prologue: Be OK =

- Digital cover

Studio album by CIX
- Released: August 17, 2021
- Genres: K-pop; future bass; R&B; synthpop
- Length: 32:58
- Language: Korean
- Label: C9 Entertainment
- Producers: KZ; Aiming music

CIX chronology
Hello Chapter Ø: Hello, Strange Dream (2021)	OK Prologue: Be OK (2021)	Pinky Swear (2022)

Singles from OK Prologue: Be OK
- 1. "Wave" Released: August 17, 2021

OK Prologue: Be OK is the first studio album by South Korean boy band CIX. It was released through C9 Entertainment on August 17, 2021, along with the lead single "Wave" and its music video.

== Background and release ==
The album OK Prologue: Be OK marks the beginning of a new series in CIX's discography, following their previous Hello series. On July 22, 2021, pre-orders began along with the details of the album were released stating that the album will be released in three versions: Ripple, Wave, and Storm.

== Track listing ==
OK Prologue: Be OK track listing
No.	Title	Lyrics	Music	Arrangement	Length
1.	"Bad Dream"	danke	Luke Shipstad, Grant Boutin, Keta Jeaux, Garrett Raffanelli, MZMC	Luke Shipstad, Grant Boutin, MZMC	3:20
2.	"Off My Mind"	danke	CR (Aiming music), Kim Subin (Aiming music), Cho Se Hee (Aiming music), Jimmy Claeson, BX	Aiming music	3:04
3.	"Wave"	danke	CR (Aiming music), Kim Subin (Aiming music), Kim Donh Young, Jimmy Claeson	Aiming music	3:19
4.	"Lost"	danke, Lee Ju Hyeon	KZ, Kim Tae Young, Sean MAlexander, SQVARE	KZ, Kim Tae Young	3:09
5.	"Genie in a Bottle"	danke	Erik Lidbom, MLC, CR (Aiming music)	Erik Lidbom, Aiming music	3:07
6.	"20" (20살)	danke	CR (Aiming music), Kim Subin (Aiming music), Chae Ganghae, BX	Aiming music	3:03
7.	"Ice"	danke	CR (Aiming music), Kim Subin (Aiming music), Lee Jooheon, Mazen Awad	Aiming music	3:31
8.	"In & Out" (숨)	Kim Su ji	KZ, Kim Tae Yeong, Sean Alexander, Sqvare	KZ, Kim Tae Yeong	3:08
9.	"Confession" (고해)	Oh Hyun Sun	Ben Charles, CR (Aiming music), BX	Ben Charles	3:42
10.	"Here for You"	Mike Watson, Jonas Ekdahl	KZ, Kim Tae Yeong, Mike Watson, Jonas Ekdahl	KZ, Kim Tae Yeong	3:35
Total length:					32:58

== Charts ==
Chart performance for OK Prologue: Be OK
Chart (2021)	Peak position
Japanese Albums (Oricon)	20
South Korean Albums (Gaon)	4

== Release history ==
Country	Date	Format	Label
Various	August 17, 2021	CD; digital download; streaming	C9 Entertainment
South Korea	August 17, 2021	CD; digital download; streaming	C9 Entertainment
