= Hard to Say Goodbye =

Hard to Say Goodbye can refer to three unrelated songs:

- "Hard to Say Goodbye," a 2019 song by Bae Jin-young, the title track to Bae's album of the same name
- "Hard to Say Goodbye," a 2017 song by Washed Out
- "Hard to Say Goodbye," a 2012 song by Merrill Osmond
