= Good Day (group) =

South Korean girl group

- Origin: Seoul, South Korea
- Genres: K-pop
- Years active: 2017–2019
- Label: C9 Entertainment
- Past members: Heejin; Genie; Cherry; Chaesol; Nayoon; Jiwon; Haeun; Viva; Bomin; Lucky
- Website: Good Day Official Homepage

Good Day (Korean: 굿데이) was a South Korean girl group formed by C9 Entertainment, with ten members: Heejin, Genie, Cherry, Chaesol, Nayoon, Jiwon, Haeun, Viva, Bomin and Lucky. They debuted on August 30, 2017, with their first and only EP All Day Good Day.

It is said that the group has disbanded, as C9 Girlz (later named Cignature) was announced on November 11, 2019.

== History ==
=== Pre-debut ===
In 2012, Haeun was part of a three-member girl group Littles, under Nega Network but never debuted and only released an OST for the drama The Great Seer. In 2013, Heejin competed in Superstar K5 and finished in 3rd place. Bomin appeared in movie No Breathing, as the younger version of Yuri's role. In 2015, Heejin released her debut single titled "To Reach You", which features rapper Olltii. She has also sang OSTs for dramas Late Night Restaurant and Into the Flames. Jiwon was a model under teenage fashion online shopping portal Sonyunara.

=== 2017–2018: Debut and The Unit ===
In July 2017, C9 Entertainment announced the launching of their first girl group with temporary name, C9 Girls through SNS account. From July 7 to 12, the ten members were revealed and would debut as "Good Day". Ahead of their debut, the group's own reality show "Good Day 2 U" was aired from July 20 till August 10 through Naver V Live.

Good Day debuted on August 30 with their first EP All Day Good Day, with the title track "Rolly", featuring the appearance of Bae Jin-young in the music video. The EP includes three tracks from the group's units: Good Morning, Good Night and Midnight. On September 3, they have held their debut mini concert "All Day Good Day" at the Yes24 Live Hall.

6 members of the group: Heejin, Genie, Chaesol, Jiwon, Viva and Lucky were confirmed to join the reality television series The Unit. All the participating members except Lucky passed the Boot Evaluations in Episode 1. However, Lucky was brought back into the competition in Episode 4. Genie and Chaesol were eliminated in the first elimination round (Episode 7). Heejin, Viva and Lucky were eliminated in the third elimination round (Episode 13). Jiwon finished 11th in the finals, therefore being unable to debut with UNI.T.

=== Post-disbandment and members' re-debuts ===
On November 11, 2019, C9 Entertainment confirmed the launching of future girl group temporarily named C9 Girlz, with Jiwon, who would re-debut under the stage name Jeewon, named the first member of the future girl group. Chaesol was introduced as a member of the group on November 13. Viva, who would re-debut under the stage name Sunn, was introduced on November 14. Lucky, who would re-debut under the stage name Belle, was introduced on November 15. Haeun, who would re-debut under the stage name Ye Ah, was introduced on November 16.

On January 14, 2020, it was confirmed that the five members aforementioned would re-debut through the seven-member girl group Cignature, under C9 Entertainment's sub-label J9 Entertainment. On February 4, Cignature had made their debut. While Cignature was active, in November 2023 Belle took a hiatus from group activities and participated in the reality competition show Universe Ticket, eventually finishing in the top 8, therefore being able to re-debut with Unis. During her time with Unis, she would not participate in activities with Cignature. Cignature eventually disbanded on December 3, 2024.

Heejin is currently part of the producing crew Solcire, and is also active as a singer-songwriter.

On May 4, 2020, it was confirmed that the four former Good Day members: Genie, Cherry, Nayoon & Bomin - who all left C9 Entertainment - would re-debut through a new five-member girl group Redsquare, under About Entertainment, on May 19. Cherry re-debuted under the new stage name ChaeA, while Genie re-debuted under the new stage name Green, and Nayoon re-debuted under the new stage name Ari. However, the group had a two-year hiatus after debut, and during the hiatus they were transferred to Iconic Music and Entertainment, a subsidiary of Taewon Entertainment. On June 10, 2022, the group had been re-branded into Irris, effectively disbanding Redsquare, and Bomin had departed from the group. On July 6, Genie, Cherry and Nayoon re-debuted again through the four-member girl group Irris. The three aforementioned members re-debuted under new stage names I.L, Liv, and Yunseul respectively. Irris had reportedly disbanded when member I.L had terminated her contract with her agency.

On July 30, 2024, Jiwon released her first solo single "Let's Go To The Sea", a remake of the song by Rozy. Then on August 25, 2025, Jiwon released the solo single "Devil's Jam" under her new stage name ZZONE. Subsequently on January 8, 2026, Jiwon and Haeun re-debuted with the girl band Latency. However, on August 14 the same year, both have left the band.

== Former members ==
=== Good Morning Unit ===
- Genie (Korean: 지니)
- Nayoon (나윤)
- Jiwon (지원)
- Bomin (보민)
- Lucky (럭키)

=== Good Night Unit ===
- Heejin (희진) — Leader
- Haeun (하은)

=== Midnight Unit ===
- Cherry (체리)
- Chaesol (채솔)
- Viva (비바)

== Discography ==
=== Extended plays ===
Title	Album details	Peak chart positions	Sales
Title	Album details	KOR	Sales
All Day Good Day	Released: August 30, 2017; Label: C9 Entertainment; Format: CD, digital download; Track listing: 1. Rolly; 2. Skip This Moment (이 순간을 넘어); 3. Fly Away; 4. Party After Party	19	KOR: 1,728+

=== Soundtrack appearances ===
Title	Year	Album
"Shelter" (Heejin featuring Lee Yo-han)	2017	Because This Is My First Life OST Part 6

== Filmography ==
=== Music Videos ===
Title	Year	Director(s)	Notes
"Rolly"	2017	Unknown	Appearance by CIX's Bae Jin-young

=== Reality and variety shows ===
Year	Show	Network	Note(s)
2017	GOOD DAY 2 U	Naver V App	4 episodes
2017	The Unit: Idol Rebooting Project	KBS2	Heejin, Genie, Chaesol, Jiwon, Viva, Lucky participated

== Concert ==
- Good Day Debut Mini Concert "All Day Good Day" (2017)
