= Redsquare =

South Korean girl group

- Also known as: RSQ
- Origin: Seoul, South Korea
- Genres: K-pop
- Years active: 2020–2022
- Labels: Iconic MnE; About Entertainment
- Spinoff of: Good Day
- Past members: Green; Lina; ChaeA; Ari; Bomin; Heejin

Redsquare (Korean: 레드스퀘어, stylized as REDSQUARE) was a five-member South Korean girl group formed by About Entertainment and managed by ICONIC Music & Entertainment. The group debuted on May 19, 2020, with their single album Prequel.

== History ==
=== Pre-debut ===
4 members of Redsquare: Green, ChaeA, Ari, and Bomin are former members of Good Day, a girl group that was formed by C9 Entertainment. The group debuted on August 30, 2017, with their only EP All Day Good Day. After debut, Green participated in survival show The Unit with 5 other members. However, she was eliminated during the first elimination round and ranked 46th.

Lina originally debuted as a solo artist under About Entertainment, using the stage name Blenn, with her single album Do I Feel on March 16, 2020. She also appeared in musical productions and endorsed cosmetic brand LUI & LUI.

=== 2020: Debut and new company ===
On March 23, 2020, About Entertainment announced that they would debut their first 5-member girl group and subsequently released the first teaser. The company slowly revealed the members with their initials, followed by their full stage names.

The group debuted on May 19, 2020, with their single album Prequel, alongside the music video of the lead single "ColorFull". Also featured on prequel was a 46-second instrumental B-Side "Spoiler", that was only accessible on the album's physical CD.

On December 31, 2020, the group announced that they signed to a new company Iconic Music & Entertainment (ICONICMnE), a division of the entertainment and media production company Taewon Entertainment.

=== 2022: Rebranding ===
On June 12, 2022, it was announced that Redsquare rebranded into Irris, now managed by Justice Records (a newly launched music division of Taewon Entertainment) and Mellow Entertainment. Hence, this led to the disbandment of the group.

== Members ==
- Green (그린)
- Lina (리나)
- ChaeA (채아)
- Ari (아리)
- Bomin (보민)

== Discography ==
=== Single albums ===
Title	Details	Peak chart positions	Sales
Title	Details	KOR	Sales
Prequel	Released: May 19, 2020; Label: About Entertainment, YG Plus; Formats: CD, digital download, streaming; Track listing: 1. Colorfull; 2. Colorfull (Inst.); 3. Spoiler (CD only)	38	KOR: 1,731

=== Singles ===
Title	Year	Peak chart positions	Album
Title	Year	KOR	Album
"Colorfull"	2020	—	Prequel

== Videography ==
=== Music videos ===
Title	Year	Director(s)	Notes
"Colorfull"	2020	Wanda	
