= ZZONE =

South Korean singer and musician (born 1999)

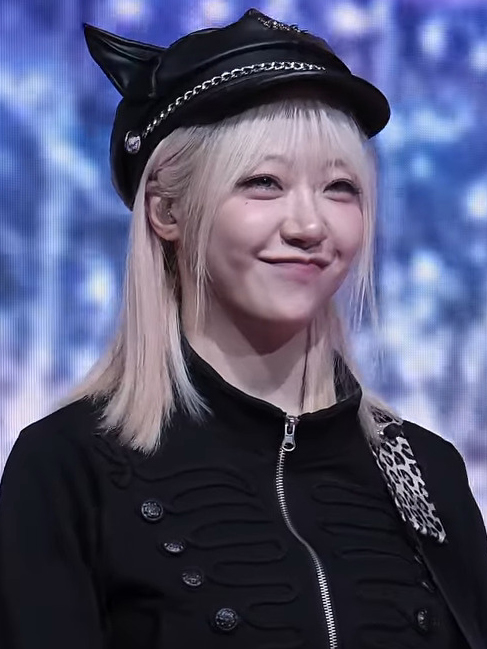
- ZZONE in 2026
- Born: Kim Ji-won; April 1, 1999 (age 27); South Korea
- Occupations: Singer, musician
- Musical career
- Genre: K-pop
- Instruments: Vocals; guitar
- Years active: 2017–present
- Labels: C9 Entertainment; J9 Entertainment; Oddinary Records
- Formerly of: Good Day; Cignature; Latency

Korean name
- Hangul: 김지원
- RR: Gim Jiwon
- MR: Kim Chiwŏn

Stage name
- Hangul: 지지원
- RR: Jijiwon
- MR: Chijiwŏn

Kim Ji-won (Korean: 김지원; born April 1, 1999), known professionally as Jeewon (지원) and as a soloist by the stage name ZZONE (지지원), is a South Korean singer and guitarist. She was the guitarist for the band Latency and a former member of girl groups Good Day and Cignature. She is known for her viral performance at the 2024 Waterbomb Festival.

== Early life ==
Kim Ji-won was born on April 1, 1999.

== Career ==
=== 2017–2024: Good Day, Cignature, and solo activities ===
In August 2017, ZZONE debuted as a member of the girl group Good Day under C9 Entertainment, going by her birth name. In February 2020, C9 redebuted ZZONE as a member of Cignature under the sub-label J9, using the name Jeewon.

In early 2024, ZZONE made her acting debut in the web series "Our Love Triangle" as the rival of the main female character. In February, ZZONE was announced as a character model for the first-person shooter video game Sudden Attack. On May 23, ZB and Ation released the EDM song "Eternal Time" featuring ZZONE. In June, ZZONE began appearing as an MC on the variety show "Noppakku" with host Tak Jae-hoon. During her first episode, a guest on the show made remarks to her that were criticized as sexual harassment and Tak later released an official apology to ZZONE. ZZONE departed the show suddenly after one month.

On July 5, ZZONE appeared at the 2024 Waterbomb Festival on stage to perform the song "Eternal Time" with ZB and Ation. ZZONE's performance went viral on social media and she was referred to as "Waterbomb goddess", with a fan-recorded video reaching 500,000 views within five days and 1.6 million views as of September 2025. On July 30, ZZONE released her first solo single "Let's Go To The Sea", a remake of the song by Rozy. In November, Cignature disbanded and terminated their contracts with their label.

=== 2025–present: Debut with Latency ===
In June 2025, fellow K-pop idol Hyunjin announced she was joining a band project with ZZONE. On August 25, ZZONE released her second single "Devil's Jam" along with a "B-grade horror-like" music video. In October, the web series Motchuh Do Rock! launched, following the formation of the band Latency under the label Oddinary Records with ZZONE, going by Jeewon, as a guitarist.

On January 8, 2026, Latency officially debuted with their single "It Was Love". In August, ZZONE departed the group along with members Haeun and Semi, following Hyunjin's departure in May.

== Discography ==
=== Singles ===
Title	Year	Album
"Let's Go To The Sea"	2024	Non-album singles
"Devil's Jam"	2025	Non-album singles

=== As featured artist ===
Title	Year	Album
"Eternal Time" (ZB and Ation featuring Jeewon of Cignature)	2024	Non-album single

=== Songwriting credits ===
All songwriting credits are adapted from the Korea Music Copyright Association's database.

Title	Year	Artist	Album
"It Was Love" (사랑이었는데)"	2026	Latency	Late O'Clock
"Latency"	2026	Latency	Late O'Clock
"Starry Night"	2026	Latency	Late O'Clock

== Videography ==
=== Music videos ===
Title	Year	Ref.
"Devil's Jam"	2025	

== Filmography ==
=== Television shows ===
Year	Name	Role	Ref.
2017–2018	The Unit: Idol Rebooting Project	Contestant	
2024	Noppakku Tak Jaehoon	MC	

=== Web series ===
Year	Name	Role	Ref.
2024	Our Love Triangle (내짝남X날짝남)	Park Seo-Ah	
2025	Motchuh Do Rock!	Herself	

=== Hosting ===
Year	Title	Notes	Ref.
2024	2024 Boryeong Mud Festival K-Pop Super Live	with Jihan of Weeekly and Seo-won of Unis	
