= Latency (band) =

South Korean girl band

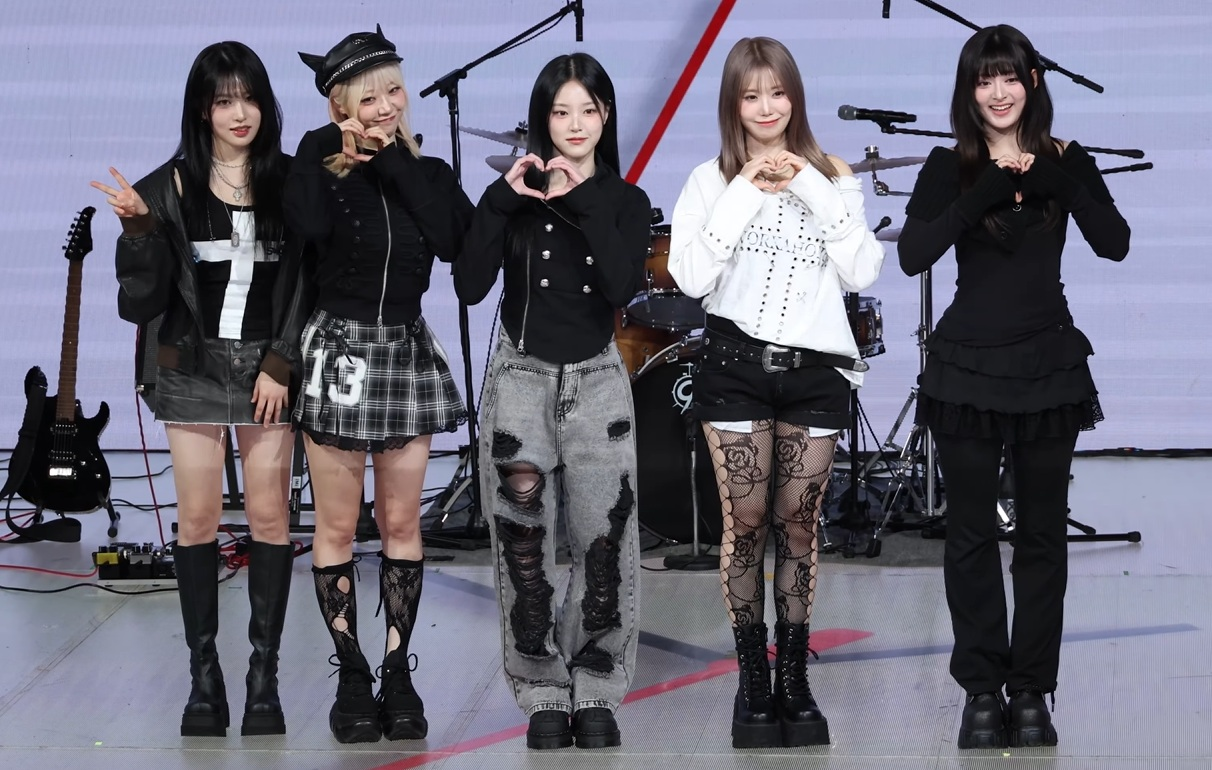
- Latency in 2026; L–R: Heeyeon, Jeewon, Hyunjin, Haeun, and Semi

Background information
- Origin: Seoul, South Korea
- Genres: K-pop; pop rock
- Years active: 2026–present
- Label: Oddinary Records
- Members: Heeyeon; Soobin; Seoryhn; Yujin
- Past members: Hyunjin; Haeun; Jeewon; Semi

Latency (Korean: 레이턴시, stylized in all caps) is a South Korean all-female pop rock band under Oddinary Records. They debuted on January 8, 2026 with the single "It Was Love". The band consists of four members: guitarist Heeyeon, bassist Soobin, drummer Seoryhn, and vocalist Yujin.

The band was originally a quintet with drummer Hyunjin, pianist Haeun, guitarist Jeewon, bassist Semi, and guitarist Heeyeon. Hyunjin left the band in May 2026 to focus on her health and Haeun, Semi, and Jeewon left in August 2026 for personal reasons. The group's original members are known for previous experience in the South Korean entertainment industry; Jeewon, Haeun, and Semi are former members of Cignature, Hyunjin is a member of Loona and Loossemble, and Heeyeon is a YouTuber under the name Fingerstylish.

== History ==
=== 2016–2025: Pre-debut activities ===
In November 2016, Hyunjin debuted under Blockberry Creative as the second member of the then upcoming group Loona with her eponymous single album. In August 2017, Jeewon and Haeun debuted as members of the girl group Good Day under C9 Entertainment. On August 20, 2018, Hyunjin debuted with Loona as a full group. In February 2020, C9 redebuted Jeewon and Haeun and debuted Semi as members of Cignature under the sub-label J9, with Haeun taking the stage name Ye Ah.

In 2021, Haeun terminated her contract with J9 and left Cignature. In 2023, Heeyeon, also known as the Youtuber Fingerstylish, worked as a guitar instructor for the then upcoming band QWER. In September, Hyunjin debuted as a member of Loossemble under CTDENM after terminating her contract with Blockberry Creative. In November 2024, Hyunjin's exclusive contract with CTDENM ended, and Cignature disbanded and terminated their contracts with their label.

In June 2025, Hyunjin founded her own independent artist label and announced she was joining a band project with Jeewon. On August 25, Jeewon released her solo single "Devil's Jam" under the stage name ZZONE. In October, the web series Motchuh Do Rock! launched, following Heeyeon, Jeewon, Haeun, Hyunjin, and Semi as they form the band Latency under the label Oddinary Records. The members chose the name Latency to mean "Our voices were a little delayed, but are finally heard." On November 17, Latency held their first public performance titled "November Monthly Evaluation". They played three songs including their unreleased song "It was Love", which was stated to be released soon. On November 18, Oddinary Records announced Latency would debut in January 2026.

=== 2026–present: Debut with "It Was Love" and member line-up changes ===
On January 8, 2026, the group officially debuted with their single "It Was Love". On March 18, the group released their first extended play, Late O'Clock, which included the previously released single. On the same day, the group released a music video for the title track "Latency".

On May 22, Hyunjin announced that she would be leaving the band to prioritize her health. On July 29, Latency released the digital single "We Just", their first song after Hyunjin's departure. On August 14, Haeun, Jeewon, and Semi were announced to have left the band for personal reasons, leaving Heeyeon as the only member. In October, bassist Soobin, drummer Seoryhn, and vocalist Yujin were added as new members to the group.

== Members ==
=== Current members ===
- Heeyeon (희연), also known as Fingerstylish (뚱치땅치) – guitar
- Soobin (수빈) – bass
- Seorhyn (서린) – drums
- Yujin (유진) – vocals

=== Past members ===
- Hyunjin (현진) – drums
- Haeun (하은) – keyboard
- Jeewon (지원) – guitar
- Semi (세미) – bass

== Discography ==
=== Extended plays ===
List of extended plays, showing selected details
Title	Details	Peak chart positions	Sales
Title	Details	KOR	Sales
Late O'Clock	Release: March 18, 2026; Label: Oddinary Records; Formats: CD, digital download, streaming; Track listing: 1. "Say Love"; 2. "Latency"; 3. "Malibu"; 4. "It Was Love"; 5. "Starry Night"	14	KOR: 11,900

=== Singles ===
List of singles, showing year released, chart positions, and name of the album
Title	Year	Peak chart positions	Album
Title	Year	KOR Down.	Album
"It Was Love" (사랑이었는데)	2026	142	Late O'Clock
"Latency"	2026	146	Late O'Clock
"We Just"	2026	—N/a	Non-album single

== Videography ==
=== Music videos ===
Year	Title	Director	Ref.
2026	"Latency"	Joohyeon Kim	

== Filmography ==
=== Web series ===
Year	Title	Note(s)	Ref.
2025-2026	Motchuh Do Rock! (못쳐 도 락!)	YouTube series following the formation of Latency	
