= Hello Chapter 2: Hello, Strange Place =

EP by CIX
- Released: November 19, 2019
- Recorded: 2019
- Genre: Hip hop; Dance
- Length: 16:31
- Language: Korean
- Label: C9
- Producer: MZMC

CIX chronology
Hello Chapter 1: Hello, Stranger (2019)	Hello Chapter 2: Hello, Strange Place (2019)	Hello Chapter 3: Hello, Strange Time (2020)

Singles from Hello Chapter 2: Hello, Strange Place
- 1. "Numb" Released: November 19, 2019

Hello Chapter 2: Hello, Strange Place is the second extended play by South Korean boy group CIX. It was released on November 19, 2019 by C9 Entertainment and distributed by Warner Music Korea. The EP consists of five tracks including the single "Numb".

== Background and release ==
On September 27, 2019, it was announced that CIX would have a comeback in November 2019. On November 1, it was revealed that CIX would return with their second EP Hello Chapter 2: Hello, Strange Place on November 19.

The music video teaser for "Numb" was released on November 18 and full music video on November 19.

"Numb" is a hip hop dance track that addresses the problem of teenagers being forced to stay quiet during unfair situations and growing "numb" after losing their dreams.

== Promotion ==
CIX held a live showcase alongside the release of the EP on November 20 where they performed "Numb". The group started promoting their title track "Numb" on November 22. They first performed the lead single on KBS' Music Bank followed by performances on MBC's Show! Music Core and SBS's Inkigayo and Mnet's M Countdown.

== Track listing ==
No.	Title	Lyrics	Music	Arrangement	Length
1.	"Black Out"	JQ, Park Ji-won, Woo Ah-ra	Anthony Pavel, Landon Sears, Kyle Buckley, MZMC, Jay Kim	Pink Slip, Inverness, MZMC	3:17
2.	"Numb" (순수의 시대)	danke	Kaelyn Behr, Anthony Pavel, MZMC, Jay Kim	Styalz Fuego	3:25
3.	"Rewind"	NODAY, Jay Kim	Kaelyn Behr, Anthony Pavel, MZMC, Jay Kim	Styalz Fuego	3:15
4.	"Bystander" (방관자)	danke	Mike Woods, Michael McCall, Anthony Pavel, Julien Maurice Moore, MZMC, Jay Kim	Mike Woods, Boston	3:26
5.	"Maybe I"	Jay Kim	Mike Woods, Michael McCall, Anthony Pavel, Julien Maurice Moore, Anthony Russo, MZMC, Jay Kim	Mike Woods, Boston, MZMC	3:08
Total length:					16:31

== Charts ==
Chart (2019)	Peak position
South Korean Albums (Gaon)	4

== Release history ==
Country	Date	Format	Label
Various	November 19, 2019	CD; digital download; streaming	C9 Entertainment
South Korea	November 19, 2019	CD; digital download; streaming	C9 Entertainment
