= Bren Joy =

American singer, songwriter

Bren Joy (born January 11, 1997) is an American singer, songwriter, and multi-instrumentalist, born and raised in Nashville, Tennessee. He signed to Warner Records in 2020. He has collaborated with an array of artists including Denzel Curry, Mae Muller, Fleurie, Pink Sweats, Kiana Ledé, Gizzle, and Landon Sears. He attended Belmont University where he majored in vocal performance. His sound is inspired by R&B, soul, hip-hop, jazz, pop, and gospel music. His collaboration track with Denzel Curry and Gizzle, "Dynasties & Dystopia", for the TV series Arcane: League of Legends, has accumulated over 128 million streams on Spotify, indicating that it has reached gold status, but lacks formal certification from the RIAA. His debut album, Twenties, has also received widespread success and acclaim. In an interview with his alma mater, he cited Kirk Franklin, Luther Vandross and John Legend as key inspirations throughout his life.

== Discography ==
Bren Joy has released one studio album, Twenties, which was released on 17 May 2019, followed up by a deluxe edition which was released on 26 May, 2021. The deluxe version contains an additional seven tracks, including guest appearances from Pink Sweats and Mae Muller. He parted with the label Warner Records after this album release. Following a three year hiatus, Joy released the twelve track studio album SUNSET BLACK on 21 February 2025.

=== Albums ===
List of Studio albums
Title	Album details
Twenties	Released: May 17, 2019; Label: Warner; Format: CD, digital download
SUNSET BLACK	Released: Feb 21, 2025; Label: STEM; Format: CD, digital download

=== Singles ===
==== As lead artist ====
Title	Year	Album
"Freezing"	2020	Twenties (Deluxe)
"Freezing (Acoustic)"	2020	Non-album single
"Fiji Fine"	2021	Twenties (Deluxe)
"Lil Rich (feat. Mae Muller) [Acoustic]"	2021	Non-album singles
"Insecure (Live In Nashville)"	2021	Non-album singles
"Headline"	2021	Non-album singles
"Dynasties & Dystopia (from the series Arcane League of Legends)" (Denzel Curry, Gizzle, & Bren Joy)	2021	Arcane League of Legends (Soundtrack from the Animated Series)
"Friends (feat. Kiana Lede)"	2021	Non-album single

As a featured artist

Title	Year	Artist	Album
"Next Time We're Flying"	2021	Landon Sears	88.1
"Strawberries & Sunsets"	2022	Fleurie	It's Always Summer in Supertropicali (Chapter 2)
