= Cignature =

South Korean girl group

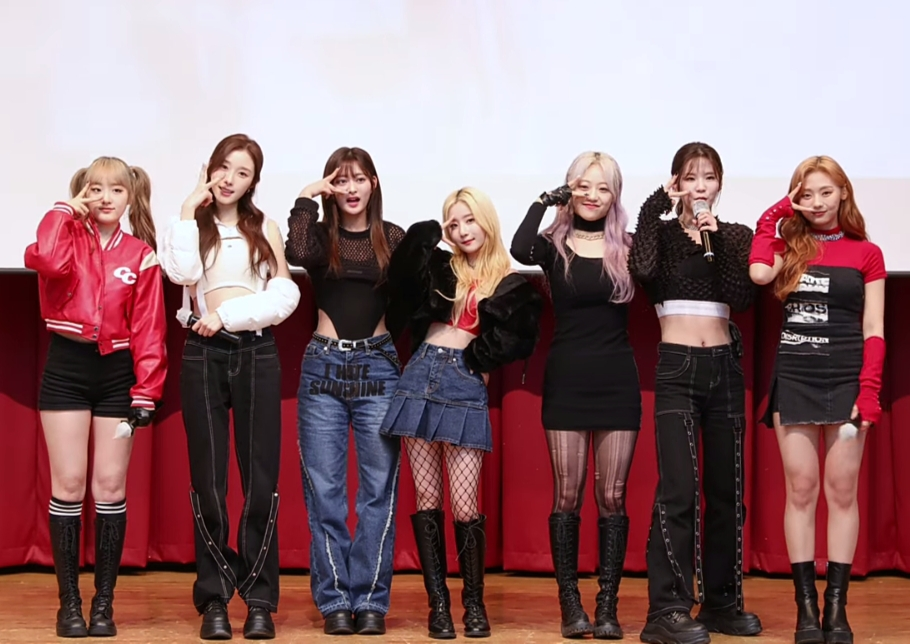
- Cignature in December 2021; L–R: Chloe, Chaesol, Semi, Dohee, Jeewon, Seline, and Belle

Background information
- Origin: Seoul, South Korea
- Genre: K-pop
- Years active: 2020–2024
- Labels: J9; C9
- Past members: Chaesol; Jeewon; Seline; Chloe; Belle; Semi; Dohee; Ye Ah; Sunn
- Website: c9ent.co.kr

Cignature (Korean: 시그니처; commonly stylized in all lowercase) was a South Korean girl group composed of Chaesol, Jeewon, Seline, Chloe, Belle, Semi, and Dohee. Formed by C9 Entertainment and managed under their exclusive girl group sub-label J9 Entertainment, the group made their debut on February 4, 2020, with their debut single "Nun Nu Nan Na". The group officially disbanded on December 3, 2024.

== History ==
=== 2019: Pre-debut and introduction ===
Chaesol, Jeewon (formerly known as Jiwon), Ye Ah (formerly known as Haeun), Sunn (formerly known as Viva), and Belle (formerly known as Lucky) were debuted on August 30, 2017, as members of C9 Entertainment first girl group Good Day. In October 2017, members Chaesol, Jeewon, Sunn, and Belle had competed in KBS2 reality television series The Unit. However, all of them were eliminated and failed to become a member of the winning project girl group Uni.T.

On November 11, 2019, C9 Entertainment launching their upcoming girl group temporarily named C9 Girlz, with Good Day's Jeewon being announced as the first member of the group and later confirming Good Day's disbandment. Subsequently, from November 12 to 17, the remaining members were introduced in the order: Semi, Chaesol, Sunn, Belle, Ye Ah, and Seline.

=== 2020–2023: Debut with Listen and Speak, Dear Diary Moment, My Little Aurora and Us in the Summer ===
On January 14, the group's name was revealed to be Cignature. On February 4, the group released their debut lead single A "Nun Nu Nan Na", while the song's full music video was released one day earlier, on February 3. Following their debut lead single B "Assa" was released on April 7. Its full music video was released on April 6, one day before the song's release date. The group released their first EP, Listen and Speak was released on September 22, with "Arisong" as the lead single. The EP also including their previous debut singles. The promotion of the EP featured a schoolgirl concept, and Whosfan, a fan-focused platform, held a promotional event for them. The EP received positive reviews, with the reviews from several news reporters describing it as refreshing, youthful, and having a unique expression method. On September 23, the demand for the EP exceeded demand forecast calculated by J9 Entertainment, and the first batch sold out. The music video for "Arisong" has reached 3 million views within two days of its release. Listen and Speak reached no. 21 on the Gaon Album Chart.

On April 27, 2021, J9 Entertainment announced that Ye Ah and Sunn had left the group and terminated their contracts with the agency due to undisclosed reasons. On June 14, J9 Entertainment announced that two new members, Chloe and Dohee, had been added to the group. On November 30, the group released their second EP Dear Diary Moment, with the lead single "Boyfriend". This is the group's first release to feature new members Chloe and Dohee, and their first release after 14 months.

On December 7, 2022, Cignature, alongside their labelmates Lee Seok-hoon, Younha, CIX and Epex were featured in the song "Merry Merry Christmas" as part of C9's first single album, "2022 C9 Christmas".

On January 17, 2023, Cignature returned after 14 months with the release of their third EP My Little Aurora. The EP consists of four tracks including the lead single "Aurora". On August 29, the group released their fourth EP Us in the Summer. The EP consists of four tracks including the lead single "Smooth Sailing". Member Belle was not involved in this comeback due to her participation in SBS survival show Universe Ticket under her real name Jin Hyeon-ju.

=== 2024: Belle's debut with Unis, Sweetie but Saltie and disbandment ===
On January 17, during the finale of Universe Ticket, Belle secured her spot as a member of the debuting group, Unis. On January 18, C9 Entertainment released a statement announcing that member Belle will promote as a member of Unis for two and a half years, and that she would not be participating in future activities with Cignature during the period and the group would continue to promote as six.

On May 24, it was announced that the group will release their fifth EP Sweetie but Saltie on June 10, 2024. On May 27, the group released a promotion scheduler for the album. On June 10, the group made their comeback with the release of the EP Sweetie But Saltie, along with its lead single "Poongdung".

On December 3, C9 Entertainment announced through the Cignature fan cafe that the group has disbanded after unanimously agreeing to end their activities on November 30, 2024. All seven members terminated their exclusive contracts with the agency.

On January 8, 2026, former Cignature members Jeewon, Semi, and Haeun (known previously as Ye Ah) debuted in the band Latency.

== Members ==
Former

- Chaesol (채솔)
- Jeewon (지원)
- Seline (셀린)
- Chloe (클로이)
- Belle (벨)
- Semi (세미)
- Dohee (도희)
- Ye Ah (예아)
- Sunn (선)

== Discography ==
=== Extended plays ===
Title	Album details	Peak chart positions	Sales
Title	Album details	KOR	Sales
Listen and Speak	Released: September 22, 2020; Label: J9 Entertainment, Genie, Stone Music; Formats: CD, digital download; Track listing: 1. "Nun Nu Nan Na" (눈누난나); 2. "Assa" (아사); 3. "Arisong" (아리송); 4. "Daldalhae" (달달해); 5. "HingHing" (힝힝)	21	KOR: 6,761
Dear Diary Moment	Released: November 30, 2021; Label: J9 Entertainment, Genie, Stone Music; Formats: CD, digital download; Track listing: 1. "My Diary"; 2. "Boyfriend"; 3. "Villain"; 4. "Climax"; 5. "Sirius"	22	KOR: 4,199
My Little Aurora	Released: January 17, 2023; Label: J9 Entertainment, Genie, Stone Music; Formats: CD, digital download; Track listing: 1. "I'm Okay"; 2. "Aurora" (오로라); 3. "Palace"; 4. "Parade"	18	KOR: 8,872
Us in the Summer	Released: August 29, 2023; Label: J9 Entertainment, Genie, Stone Music; Formats: CD, digital download; Track listing: 1. "Mess With My Mind" (어젯밤 이야기); 2. "Smooth Sailing" (안녕, 인사해); 3. "Sorry So Sorry"; 4. "Little Me"	19	KOR: 9,565
Sweetie but Saltie	Released: June 10, 2024; Label: J9 Entertainment, Kakao Entertainment; Formats: CD, digital download; Track listing: 1. "I Like I Like"; 2. "Poongdung" (풍덩); 3. "Melody"; 4. "I Like I Like (Eng. Ver)"	20	KOR: 10,888

=== Singles ===
Title	Year	Peak chart positions	Album
Title	Year	KOR DL	Album
"Nun Nu Nan Na" (눈누난나)	2020	—	Listen and Speak
"Assa" (아싸)	2020	—	Listen and Speak
"Arisong" (아리송)	2020	—	Listen and Speak
"Boyfriend"	2021	175	Dear Diary Moment
"Aurora" (오로라)	2023	124	My Little Aurora
"Smooth Sailing" (안녕, 인사해)	2023	88	Us in the Summer
"Poongdung" (풍덩)	2024	44	Sweetie but Saltie

=== Other charted songs ===
Title	Year	Peak chart positions	Album
Title	Year	KOR DL	Album
"I Like I Like"	2024	116	Sweetie but Saltie
"Melody"	2024	129	Sweetie but Saltie

=== Music videos ===
Title	Year	Director(s)	Notes
"Nun Nu Nan Na" (눈누난나)	2020		
"Assa"	2020	Sunny Visual	
"Arisong"	2020	Tiger Cave	
"Boyfriend"	2021	Sunny Visual	
"Aurora"	2023		
"Smooth Sailing"	2023	PostPattern	
"Poongdung" (풍덩)	2024		

== Awards and nominations ==
Name of the award ceremony, year presented, category, nominee of the award, and the result of the nomination
Award ceremony	Year	Category	Nominee / Work	Result	Ref.
Asia Artist Awards	2021	Female Idol Group Popularity Award	Cignature	Nominated	
Asia Model Festival	2023	Rising Star Award – Singer	Cignature	Won	
Hanteo Music Awards	2023	Blooming Star Award	Cignature	Won	
Korea First Brand Awards	2020	New Female Artist Award	Cignature	Nominated	
Melon Music Awards	2020	New Artist of the Year – Female	Cignature	Nominated	
Mnet Asian Music Awards	2020	Artist of the Year	Cignature	Nominated	
Mnet Asian Music Awards	2020	Best New Female Artist	Cignature	Nominated	
Mnet Asian Music Awards	2020	Worldwide Icon of the Year	Cignature	Nominated	
