= Innanet James =

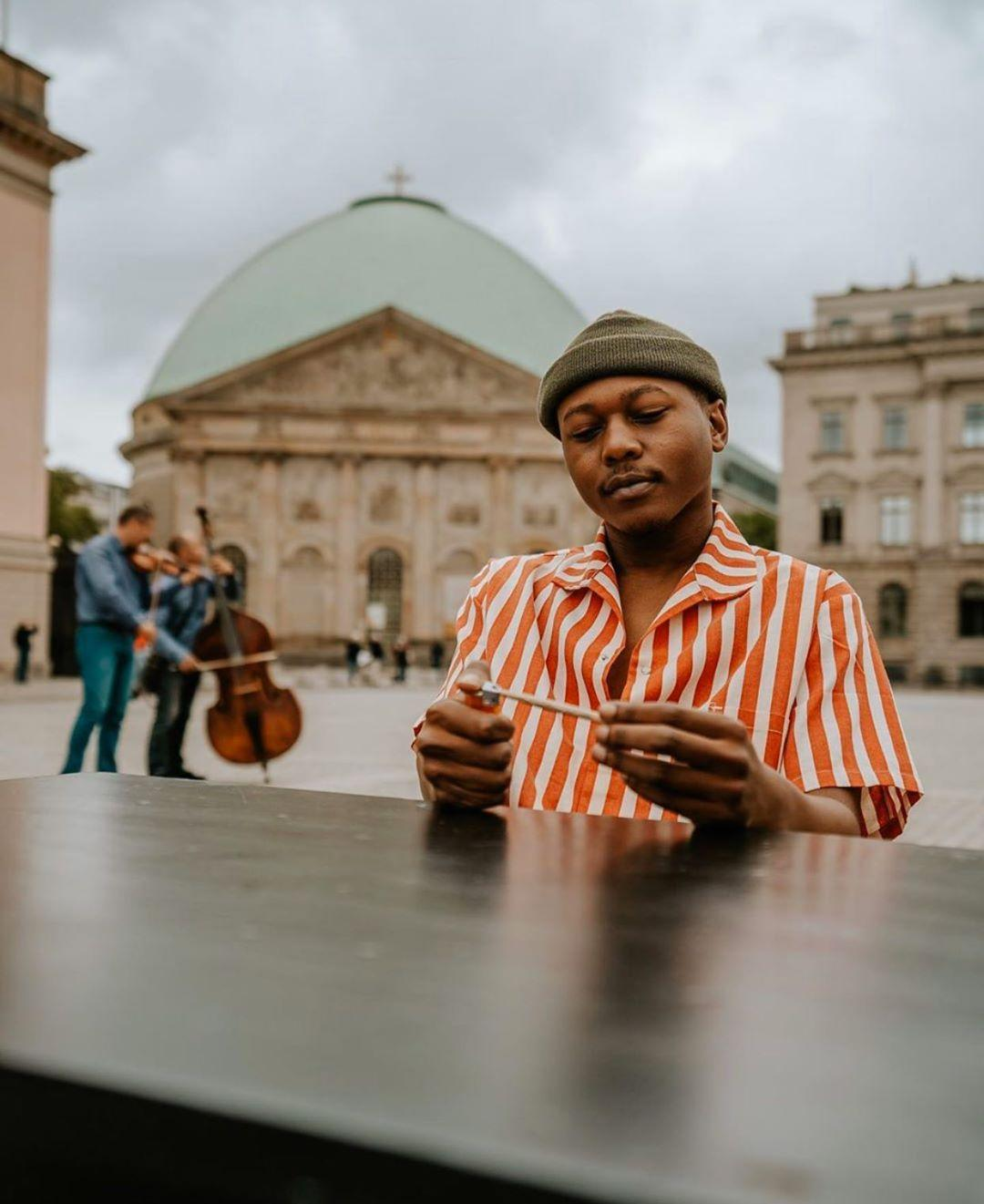
- James relaxing circa 2019

Background information
- Also known as: Saint James
- Born: December 30, 1995
- Origin: Montgomery and Prince Georges, Maryland/Washington DC
- Genres: Rap, Hip Hop
- Years active: 2015–present
- Labels: Rostrum Records

Innanet James (born December 30, 1995), known only by his onstage moniker, is an American rapper, producer, and songwriter based out of Montgomery and Prince Georges counties in Maryland. He is best known for the single "Bag" from his second album, Keep it Clean, which was featured on Madden 19, although he received a considerable amount of publicity for his single, "Black", which was featured on his first album Quebec Place. He has been compared to Vince Staples and Ghostface Killah. James is currently signed to Rostrum Record. He has performed alongside Bas on the Milky Way tour throughout North America and EarthGang throughout Europe. He has also had the song "Black" appear on the U.S. television series Dear White People. James has worked with a variety of notable artists over his career, including Pusha T, Mac Ayres, Kallitechnis, Cool Company, and Landon Sears.

== Personal life ==
Innanet James was born in Silver Spring, Maryland, but split his time growing up between Montgomery and Prince George's counties, Maryland and Washington, DC, respectively. James has stated that Lil Wayne's mixtape Da Drought 3, particularly the "Upgrade U" freestyle was the most influential record in molding his career as a rapper. He draws inspiration from the Wu Tang Clan, 50 Cent, Amy Winehouse, and Smokey Robinson, but typically writes what is in his environment. He has stated that he has been composing rap since he was in the third grade. Before finding success within the rap industry, James worked at a DSW and took graphic design classes. He is very vocal of his distaste for acting US President, Donald Trump and has expressed interest in the political campaigns of Andrew Yang and Bernie Sanders.

== Discography ==
Innanet James currently has two studio albums: Quebec Place, which was released on 26 August 2016 and Keep it Clean, released on 14 September 2018.

=== Albums ===
List of studio albums
Title	Album details
Quebec Place	Released: August 26, 2016; Label: 368 Music Group; Format: Digital download
Keep it Clean	Released: September 14, 2018; Label: Rostrum Records; Format: Digital download

=== Singles ===
List of singles
Title	Single details
Hunnids	Released: September 20, 2019; Label: HighRes Global / Rostrum Records; Format: Digital download
Long Time (Caleborate with Jayaire Woods & Innanet James)	Released: September 26, 2019; Label: TBKTR; Format: Digital download
Fancy (Remix) (Akinola Pedro with Alex Vaughn & Innanet James)	Released: September 15, 2021; Label: Inno Circle LLC; Format: Digital download
Incentivized (Landon Sears with Innanet James)	Released: April 28, 2023; Label: GoodCopBadCop LLC; Format: Digital download
