= Hello Chapter 1: Hello, Stranger =

EP by CIX
- Released: July 23, 2019
- Recorded: 2019
- Genre: K-pop
- Length: 16:43
- Language: Korean
- Label: C9; Warner Music Japan

CIX chronology
Hello Chapter 1: Hello, Stranger (2019)	Hello Chapter 2: Hello, Strange Place (2019)

Singles from Hello Chapter 1: Hello, Stranger
- 1. "Movie Star" Released: July 23, 2019

Japanese edition
- Regular Edition cover

Singles from Hello Chapter 1: Hello, Stranger (Japanese edition)
- 1. "My New World" Released: October 23, 2019

Hello Chapter 1: Hello, Stranger is the debut extended play by South Korean boy group CIX. It was released on July 23, 2019 by C9 Entertainment and distributed by Warner Music Korea. The EP consists of five tracks including the title track, "Movie Star".

== Background and release ==
On June 25, 2019, CIX released the debut date for their first EP album for July 23, and revealed the production line up through CIX's official Instagram page.

== Promotion ==
CIX first performed "Movie Star" on July 22, prior to their album release at Ulsan Kpop Festival Show.

CIX had their debut showcase on July 24 at SK Handball Stadium in Seoul Olympic Park.

== Japanese version ==
On October 23, 2019, CIX debuted in Japan with a Japanese version of their EP Hello Chapter 1: Hello, Stranger, including the song "My New World".

CIX held their Japanese debut showcase "Complete In X" at Line Cube Shibuya on November 10, and November 17 at Zepp Namba.

== Track listing ==
No.	Title	Lyrics	Music	Arrangement	Length
1.	"What You Wanted"	JQ, Kim Hye Ji (Makeumine works)	Anthony Russo, Kaelyn Behr, Julien Maurice Moore, MZMC, Jay Kim	Styalz Fuego	3:08
2.	"Movie Star"	JQ, Lee Ji Hye, Choi Seo Eun (Makeumine works)	Anthony Russo, Kaelyn Behr, Scott Quinn, MZMC, Jay Kim	Styalz Fuego	3:31
3.	"Like It That Way"	JQ, 아멜리 (Makeumine works)	Andrew Bazzi, Anthony Russo, Mike Woods, Kevin White, Kenzie, MZMC, Jay Kim	Rice N' Peas	3:15
4.	"Imagine"	Noday, Jay Kim	Anthony Russo, Landon Sears, Kyle Buckley, Rob Nelson, MZMC, Jay Kim	Pink Slip, Inverness	3:24
5.	"The One"	Noday, Jay Kim	Anthony Russo, Anthony Pavel, Kyle Buckley, Rob Nelson, John Blanda, MZMC, Jay Kim	Pink Slip, Inverness, John Blanda	3:25
Total length:					16:43

Hello Chapter 1: Hello, Stranger (Japanese edition) – bonus tracks
No.	Title	Lyrics	Music	Arrangement	Length
6.	"Movie Star" (Japanese ver)	JQ, Lee Ji Hye, Choi Seo Eun (Makeumine works)	Anthony Russo, Kaelyn Behr, Scott Quinn, MZMC, Jay Kim	Styalz Fuego	3:32
7.	"My New World"		Davey Nate, Jay Kim, MZMC, Prince Chapelle, Wilbart 'Vedo' McCoy III		3:37

== Charts ==
Chart (2019)	Peak position
French Download Albums (SNEP)	200
Japanese Albums (Oricon)	25 (Note: Peak chart position of Hello Chapter 1: Hello, Stranger (Japanese ver.) on Oricon Albums Chart.)
South Korean Albums (Gaon)	2

== Release history ==
Country	Date	Format	Label
Various	July 23, 2019	CD; digital download; streaming	C9 Entertainment
South Korea	July 23, 2019	CD; digital download; streaming	C9 Entertainment
Japan	October 23, 2019	CD; Digital download; streaming	Warner Music Japan
