= Yang Ji-won =

Yang Ji-won may refer to:

- Yang Ji-won (engineer)
- Yang Ji-won (singer)
