= Epex =

South Korean boy band

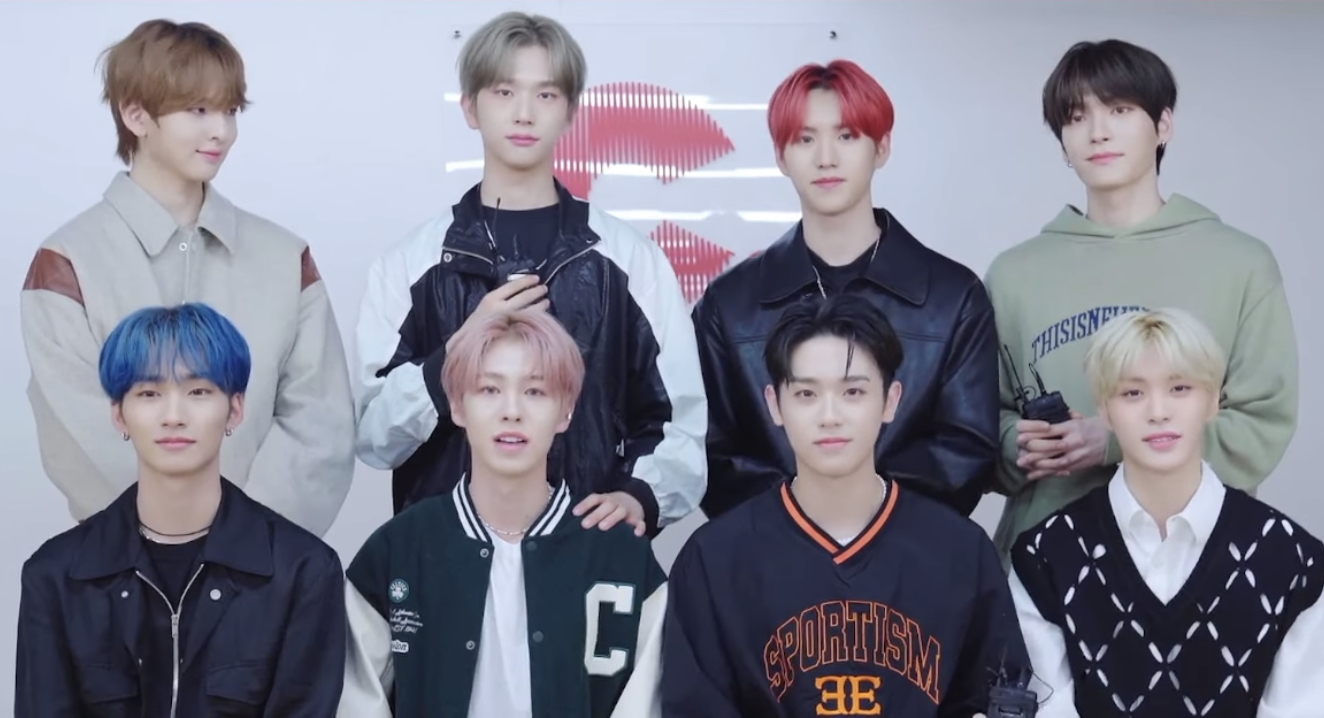
- Epex in October 2022

Background information
- Origin: Seoul, South Korea
- Genres: K-pop; hip hop; dance
- Years active: 2021–present
- Label: C9
- Members: Wish; Mu; A-Min; Baekseung; Ayden; Yewang; Jeff
- Past members: Keum
- Website: c9ent.co.kr/EPEX

Epex (Korean: 이펙스; RR: Ipekseu; stylized in all caps) is a South Korean boy band formed and managed by C9 Entertainment. The group consists of seven members: Wish, Mu, A-Min, Baekseung, Ayden, Yewang, and Jeff. Originally an eight-member group, Keum departed in November 2025. They debuted on June 8, 2021, with their first extended play (EP) Bipolar Pt.1: Prelude of Anxiety.

== Name ==
The group's name, Epex, which stands for "Eight Apex". The meaning of the group is said to be when the gathering of eight youths reaches eight different apexes.

== History ==
=== Pre-debut activities ===
Keum is a former contestant of Mnet's Produce X 101. As a 2-year old trainee representing C9 Entertainment, he was eliminated in the final episode and was ranked 17th place.

=== 2021: Introduction, debut and Bipolar series ===
On March 1, 2021, C9 Entertainment announced would introduced the members of their upcoming boy group under the tentative name C9Rookies. The group's members were revealed individually starting on March 2 (in order: Keum, Baekseung, A-Min, MU, Yewang, Jeff, Wish and Ayden). On April 1, the group's logo and official name were revealed. A teaser titled "Prelude of Anxiety" was released on May 7. Their debut EP, Bipolar Pt.1: Prelude of Anxiety and its lead single "Lock Down", was released on June 8.

On September 24, 2021, a teaser titled "Prelude of Love" was released on the group's social media accounts. Their second EP, Bipolar Pt.2: Prelude of Love and its lead single "Do 4 Me" was released on October 26.

=== 2022–2023: Prelude of Anxiety and Love series ===
On March 15, 2022, a teaser titled "21st Century Boys" was released on the group's social media accounts. Their third EP, Prelude of Anxiety Chapter 1. '21st Century Boys' and its lead single "Anthem of Teen Spirit" was released on April 11.

On October 26, they released their fourth EP Prelude of Love Chapter 1. 'Puppy Love' , a sequel of their 2021 EP Bipolar Pt.2: Prelude of Love, alongside the lead single "Hymn To Love". To commemorate the EP release, they held an online showcase in the same day. The group also announced would be embarking on their first concert tour, "Eight Apex", kicking off in Seoul on November 19–20, with ensuing shows in Osaka, Tokyo, Taipei, Kuala Lumpur and more cities.

On March 27, 2023, the group released a logo animation for their upcoming fifth EP Prelude of Love Chapter 2. 'Growing Pains', set to be released in April. Later that day, the timetable was released and confirmed that their fifth EP would be released on April 26. The EP consists of four tracks including the lead single "Sunshower". On April 26, the group held a showcase at Shinhan Play Square Live Hall in Mapo-gu, Seoul to commemorating the release of their fifth EP. Following the release of their fifth EP, the group announced to embarking their first fan-con "Sunshower" would held in June across four cities in Asia.

On September 4, 2023, the group announced schedule to be release their sixth EP Prelude of Anxiety Chapter 2. 'Can We Surrender?' on October 4. Pre-orders for the EP surpassed 260,000 copies. The sixth EP was officially released on October 4, containing four tracks including the lead single "Full Metal Jacket." It was the final chapter of Prelude of Anxiety series.

On November 17, it was announced that Epex would perform another live show, "So We Are Not Anxious", in Seoul's Blue Square Mastercard Hall on December 16 and 17.

In December, Epex collaboration with Japanese boy group Fantastics from Exile Tribe for the song "Peppermint Yum".

=== 2024–present: Youth series, collaboration and Keum's departure ===
In January 2024, Epex was announced to appear on the Japanese variety show K-Pop House for two weeks. Not long after that, they were confirmed to perform "Peppermint Yum" in the Japanese music program CDTV Live! Live! on January 22.

On February 26, 2024, the pre-release song "Graduation Day" for their upcoming first full-length album was released. On March 18, Epex confirmed that their first full-length album Youth Chapter: Youth Days would release on April 9. The album contains eight tracks including the lead single "Youth2Youth", the coupling song "Breathe In Love" and the pre-released "Graduation Day". On April 22, the coupling song "Breathe In Love" also released music video that filmed in Taiwan. The album surpassed 231,247 copies in the first week after release.

On May 4, 2024, it was announced that Epex would held their second fan-con "Youth Days" in Seoul's KBS Arena on July 27 and 28. On June 7, the second fan-con was also announced, to be held in Osaka's Zepp Osaka Bayside on September 1 and in Tokyo's Zepp Haneda on September 3. Epex released its second full-length album "Youth Chapter 2: Youth Deficiency” on November 5. Following the release, the band went on another tour, visiting Macao, Taipei, and beyond.

On May 6, 2025, Epex released the single "So Nice" in collaboration with the Arkansas-based indie rock band joan.

On May 31, 2025, Epex performed in Fuzhou, China as part of their Youth Deficiency Asia Tour. The show was the first performance by an all-Korean K-pop group in mainland China since the nation's unofficial K-pop ban went into place in 2016.

On November 21, 2025, Keum departed Epex, following the expiration of his contract with C9 Entertainment.

== Members ==
Adapted from their official website.

=== Current ===
- Wish (위시)
- MU (뮤)
- A-Min (아민)
- Baekseung (백승)
- Ayden (에이든)
- Yewang (예왕)
- Jeff (제프)

=== Former ===
- Keum (금동현)

== Discography ==
=== Studio albums ===
List of studio albums with selected details, chart positions and sales
Title	Details	Peak chart positions	Sales
Title	Details	KOR	Sales
Youth Chapter 1: Youth Days	Released: April 9, 2024; Label: C9 Entertainment; Formats: CD, digital download, streaming; Track listing: 1. "Killshot"; 2. "Breathe in Love"; 3. "Painkiller"; 4. "Youth2Youth" (청춘에게); 5. "Dominate"; 6. "Lay Up"; 7. "My Secret" (말할 수 있는 비밀); 8. "Graduation Day" (졸업식)	1	KOR: 181,685
Youth Chapter 2: Youth Deficiency	Released: November 5, 2024; Label: C9 Entertainment; Formats: CD, digital download, streaming	4	KOR: 204,929
Youth Chapter 3: Romantic Youth	Released: July 28, 2025; Label: C9 Entertainment; Formats: CD, digital download, streaming	2	KOR: 139,202

=== Extended plays ===
List of extended plays with selected details, chart positions and sales
Title	Details	Peak chart positions		Sales
Title	Details	KOR	JPN	Sales
Bipolar Pt.1: Prelude of Anxiety	Released: June 8, 2021; Label: C9 Entertainment; Formats: CD, digital download, streaming; Track listing: 1. "Go Big"; 2. "Lock Down"; 3. "Cyanide"; 4. "No Question"; 5. "Sling Shot"	10	26	KOR: 49,540; JPN: 1,540
Bipolar Pt.2: Prelude of Love	Released: October 26, 2021; Label: C9 Entertainment; Formats: CD, digital download, streaming; Track listing: 1. "Love Virus"; 2. "Do 4 Me"; 3. "Breathtaking"; 4. "Traveller" (지구핼 여행자)	6	—	KOR: 95,761
Prelude of Anxiety Chapter 1. '21st Century Boys'	Released: April 11, 2022; Label: C9 Entertainment; Formats: CD, digital download, streaming; Track listing: 1. "Lone Wolf"; 2. "Anthem of Teen Spirit" (학원歌); 3. "Burnout" (번아웃); 4. "Strike"; 5. "I'll Go First"	5	—	KOR: 71,495
Prelude of Love Chapter 1. 'Puppy Love'	Released: October 26, 2022; Label: C9 Entertainment; Formats: CD, digital download, streaming; Track listing: 1. First Love's Law (첫사랑의 법칙); 2. Love Bomb (고백 Bomb); 3. Hymn to Love (사랑歌); 4. The Vow (작은 언약식)	4	—	KOR: 99,998
Prelude of Love Chapter 2. 'Growing Pains'	Released: April 26, 2023; Label: C9 Entertainment; Formats: CD, digital download, streaming; Track listing: 1. My Darling (사랑하는 내 님아); 2. Sunshower (여우가 시집가는 날); 3. Goodbye, My First Love (안녕, 나의 첫사랑); 4. Skyline (꿈의 능선)	6	24	KOR: 110,669; JPN: 4,475
Prelude of Anxiety Chapter 2. 'Can We Surrender?'	Released: October 4, 2023; Label: C9 Entertainment; Formats: CD, digital download, streaming; Track listing: 1. Surrender; 2. Full Metal Jacket; 3. Hit the Wall; 4. No Roof	3	—	KOR: 214,099
Youth: Epilogue	Released: June 9, 2026; Label: C9 Entertainment; Formats: CD, digital download, streaming; Track listing: 1. "Echo"; 2. "Better Days"; 3. "Boys in the Band"; 4. "Call It Love"	5	—	KOR: 105,148

=== Singles ===
List of singles, showing year released, selected chart positions, and name of the album
Title	Year	Peak chart position	Album
Title	Year	KOR Down.	Album
"Lock Down"	2021	—	Bipolar Pt.1: Prelude of Anxiety
"Do 4 Me"	2021	—	Bipolar Pt.2: Prelude of Love
"Anthem of Teen Spirit" (학원歌)	2022	—	Prelude of Anxiety Chapter 1. '21st Century Boys'
"Hymn to Love" (사랑歌)	2022	127	Prelude of Love Chapter 1. 'Puppy Love'
"Sunshower" (여우가 시집가는 날)	2023	96	Prelude of Love Chapter 2. 'Growing Pains'
"Full Metal Jacket"	2023	150	Prelude of Anxiety Chapter 2. 'Can We Surrender?'
"Youth2Youth"	2024	39	Youth Chapter 1: Youth Days
"Universe"	2024	25	Youth Chapter 2: Youth Deficiency
"Grateful to Tears (눈물나게 고마워)"	2025	67	Youth Chapter 3: Romantic Youth
"Echo"	2026	88	Youth Chapter: Epilogue
"—" denotes releases that did not chart or were not released in that region.

=== Other charted songs ===
Title	Year	Peak chart positions	Album
Title	Year	KOR Down.	Album
"First Love's Law" (첫사랑의 법칙)	2022	158	Prelude of Love Chapter 1. 'Puppy Love'
"Love Bomb" (고백 Bomb)	2022	160	Prelude of Love Chapter 1. 'Puppy Love'
"The Vow" (작은 언약식)	2022	162	Prelude of Love Chapter 1. 'Puppy Love'
"My Darling" (사랑하는 내 님아)	2023	145	Prelude of Love Chapter 2. 'Growing Pains'
"Goodbye, My First Love" (안녕, 나의 첫사랑)	2023	146	Prelude of Love Chapter 2. 'Growing Pains'
"Skyline" (꿈의 능선)	2023	149	Prelude of Love Chapter 2. 'Growing Pains'
"Killshot"	2024	68	Youth Chapter 1: Youth Days
"Breathe in Love"	2024	65	Youth Chapter 1: Youth Days
"Painkiller"	2024	70	Youth Chapter 1: Youth Days
"Dominate"	2024	71	Youth Chapter 1: Youth Days
"Lay Up"	2024	72	Youth Chapter 1: Youth Days
"My Secret" (말할 수 있는 비밀)	2024	69	Youth Chapter 1: Youth Days
"Graduation Day" (졸업식)	2024	75	Youth Chapter 1: Youth Days
"My Girl"	2024	—	Youth Chapter 2: Youth Deficiency
"So Nice?" (featuring. Joan)	2025	—	Non-album single

== Videography ==
=== Music videos ===
Title	Year	Director(s)	Ref.
"Lock Down"	2021	Kim Woo-je (ETUI Collective)	
"Do 4 Me"	2021	Kim Woo-je (ETUI Collective)	
"Anthem of Teen Spirit"	2022	Kim Woo-je (ETUI Collective)	
"Hymn to Love"	2022	Kim Woo-je (ETUI Collective)	
"Sunshower"	2023	Kim Woo-je (ETUI Collective)	
"Full Metal Jacket"	2023	Kim Woo-je (ETUI Collective)	
"Graduation Day"	2024	Gustavo Ku (THIRDEYEVIDEO)	
"YOUTH2YOUTH	2024	Gustavo Ku (THIRDEYEVIDEO)	
"Breathe in Love"	2024	Sunnyvisual	
"My Girl"	2024	Sunnyvisual	
"UNIVERSE"	2024	Gustavo Ku (THIRDEYEVIDEO)	
"Closer"	2024	Gustavo Ku (THIRDEYEVIDEO)	

== Concerts and tours ==
=== Headlining tours ===
- Eight Apex (2022)
- So We Are Not Anxious (2023–2024)
- Youth Deficiency Asia Tour (2024–2025)

=== Fancon ===
- Sunshower (2023)
- Youth Days (2024)

== Filmography ==
=== Television shows ===
Year	Title	Network	Role	Notes	Ref.
2021	Welcome 2 House	Mnet	Main	Reality show (with TO1)	

== Awards and nominations ==
Name of the award ceremony, year presented, award category, nominee(s) of the award, and the result of the nomination
Award ceremony	Year	Category	Nominee(s)	Result	Ref.
Asia Artist Awards	2021	Male Idol Group Popularity Award	Epex	Nominated	
Gaon Chart Music Awards	2022	New Artist of the Year – Physical	Bipolar Pt.2: Prelude of Love	Nominated	
Golden Disc Awards	2022	Rookie Artist of the Year	Epex	Nominated	
Hallyu Influencer Grand Prize Awards (Note: The 2022 Hallyu Influencer Awards (planned/directed by Lee Ail) held at the large studio on the 1st floor of the Ilsan Bitmaru Broadcasting Center on June 1st was hosted by JGMC and hosted by Payton Foundation and HR Entertainment, OBS Kyungin TV, bntnews, It was held with the official support of Kukje News and Reborn Nature.)	2022	The Male Idol in the Rise	Epex	Won	
Hanteo Music Awards	2021	Rookie Award – Male Group	Epex	Won	
Hanteo Music Awards	2022	Emerging Artist Award	Epex	Won	
K Global Heart Dream Awards	2023	K Global Next Leader Award	Epex	Won	
Korea Culture Entertainment Awards	2021	Best New Male Artist	Epex	Won	
Mnet Asian Music Awards	2021	Best New Male Artist	Epex	Nominated	
Mnet Asian Music Awards	2021	Artist of the Year	Epex	Longlisted	
Mnet Asian Music Awards	2021	Album of the Year	Bipolar Pt.1: Prelude of Anxiety	Longlisted	
Seoul Music Awards	2022	Rookie of the Year	Epex	Won	
Seoul Music Awards	2022	Popularity Award	Epex	Nominated	
Seoul Music Awards	2022	K-wave Popularity Award	Epex	Nominated	
