= CIX (band) =

South Korean boy band (2019–2026)

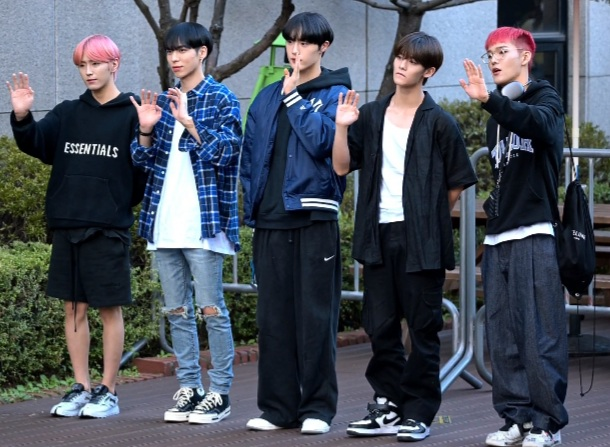
- CIX in September 2022

Background information
- Origin: Seoul, South Korea
- Genres: K-pop; electro hop; R&B
- Years active: 2019–2026
- Labels: C9; Warner Music Japan
- Past members: BX; Seunghun; Yonghee; Hyunsuk; Jinyoung
- Website: c9ent.co.kr/CIX

CIX (Korean: 씨아이엑스; RR: Ssiaiekseu; pronounced as C-I-X) was a South Korean boy band formed by C9 Entertainment. The group consists of BX, Seunghun, Yonghee, and Hyunsuk. CIX was originally a five-piece ensemble; Bae Jin-young left the group in August 2024. They debuted on July 23, 2019, with their first EP Hello Chapter 1: Hello, Stranger and disbanded following the expiration of all members' contracts.

== Name ==
The group's name, CIX, the English acronym of "Complete in X", means that it is completed only when all 5 unknown members come together, and it implies the meaning of "completion of unknown numbers".

== History ==
=== 2017–2018: Pre-debut activities ===
As a 10-month old trainee, Bae Jin-young representing C9 Entertainment, participated in the reality competition series Produce 101 Season 2, finishing in tenth place and becoming members of the project boy group Wanna One. He promoted with the group until its disbandment in January 2019. In April 2019, Bae later debuted as a soloist with his self-composed album Hard to Say Goodbye and held his first Asia fan-meeting tour "I'm Young" in connection with his debut, featuring eleven shows.

In October 2017, BX participated in the reality competition series Mix Nine under his birth name Lee Byoung-gon and finishing in 9th place thus earning a spot in the winning group. However, YG later decided not to debut said group. In November 2017, Seunghun appeared on survival program Stray Kids as a trainee of YG Entertainment. In 2018, BX and Kim Seung-hun competed in the survival show YG Treasure Box for the label's next boy group, Treasure, where both failed to debut in the finale.

=== 2019–2021: Debut, Hello tetralogy and begin of OK series ===
In February 2019, C9 starting revealed all five-members individual profile videos of upcoming boy group with tentative name C9Boyz.

In May 2019, the group's official name and logo were revealed. Ahead of debut, the group broadcast the reality show Hello CIX on June 4, 2019, through V Live. The show consisted of 10 episodes showcasing their various charms and road to debut.

On July 23, 2019, CIX released their debut EP Hello Chapter 1: Hello, Stranger and lead single "Movie Star". The album was a mild commercial success, selling 70,000 copies in two months. "Hello, Stranger", the debut showcase of CIX, was held on July 24, at SK Olympic Handball Gymnasium and the tickets reportedly sold out within 30 seconds, with over 16,000 fans trying to get on the server at once and with over 5,000 fans being put on standby for the tickets. On July 30, six days after their debut showcase, the group placed first on The Show, and earned the title of one of the fastest winning K-pop acts. CIX signed with Warner Music Japan in August and made their Japanese debut on October 23, 2019, with a Japanese version of Hello Chapter 1: Hello, Stranger. The Japanese album features an additional Japanese track called "My New World". On November 10, CIX held their Japanese debut showcase "Complete in X" at Line Cube Shibuya, and at Zepp Namba on November 17. Nine days later, CIX released their second EP Hello Chapter 2: Hello, Strange Place with the lead single "Numb", tackling social issues among youth in South Korea, such as poor mental health, bullying, and the obsession with test results among students.

On April 1, 2020, CIX released their first Japanese single Revival. On April 15, C9 announced that CIX would hold their 1st fan-meeting tour, "Hello, FIX" starting from locations in North America, Taiwan, Thailand, and South Korea, but were postponed due to the COVID-19 pandemic. In September, the fan-meeting was announced to be held online on October 11 in 40 regions. On April 30, CIX announced that their third EP Hello Chapter 3: Hello, Strange Time with the lead single "Jungle", which was originally set to be released on June 30, 2020. On June 24, it was announced that a member of the group, Bae Jin-young, had injured himself during a practice session. C9 stated that due to his injury they would have to postpone the release of the album and new plans would be released soon. On October 15, CIX announced that their third EP would be released on October 27, 2020.

On January 14, 2021, CIX announced their fourth EP Hello Chapter Ø: Hello, Strange Dream and its lead single "Cinema" would be released on February 2. On April 14, CIX released their second Japanese single All For You. On July 1, CIX released the promotional single "Tesseract" through Universe Music for the mobile application Universe. On August 17, their first studio album OK Prologue: Be OK and its lead single "Wave" was released.

=== 2022–2026: Pinky Swear, continue of OK series, Jinyoung's departure, Thunder Fever, GO series and disbandment ===
In March 2022, C9 announced that CIX would hold their first concert, Rebel, starting from April 15 to 17. C9 later announced new dates, with additional legs in the United States. On March 30, 2022, CIX released their first Japanese studio album Pinky Swear. On August 22, CIX released their fifth EP OK Episode 1: OK Not. On November 15, CIX announced that they would hold a world tour, "Save Me, Kill Me", starting from December 30 and 31 in Seoul and would continue in Europe and US.

On February 20, 2023, CIX announced the addition of four cities. On May 11, CIX announced that their sixth EP OK Episode 2: I'm OK would be released on May 29.

On August 5, 2024, C9 Entertainment announced the departure of member Bae Jin-young from the group after his contract with the company had ended on August 1 and the group continued as a four-piece group.

In December 2024, it was announced that the remaining four-member will release their seventh EP Thunder Fever in January 2025.On January 23, 2025, their seventh EP officially released with the electropop lead single "Thunder".The group also embarked on their fourth concert, "Thunder Fever", began in Seoul on March 28 and 29.The concert successfully held in Tokyo on April 29 and more shows was announced to be held in five Europe cities and eleven North America cities schedule in June and July.

On September 8, 2025, CIX released the EP GO Chapter 1: GO Together, with the self-composed track by BX titled "Wonder You" serving as the lead single and also marking the first entry of GO series.To promote the EP, the group held their fifth tour, GO Together, began in Seoul on November 1 and 2.The concert concluded in Tokyo on November 23 and Osaka on December 14.

On April 29, 2026, C9 announced that CIX will be disbanding, with BX and Seunghun's contracts ending on April 30, Yonghee enlisting on May 11, and Hyunsuk's contract ending on May 31.

== Members ==
Adapted from their official profiles.

- BX (비엑스) – leader, rapper
- Seunghun (승훈) – vocalist
- Yonghee (용희) – vocalist
- Hyunsuk (현석) – vocalist, rapper, dancer
- Jinyoung (배진영) – vocalist, dancer

== Discography ==
=== Studio albums ===
List of studio albums, with selected chart positions and sales
Title	Details	Peak chart positions		Sales
Title	Details	KOR	JPN	Sales
Korean
OK Prologue: Be OK	Released: August 17, 2021 (KOR); Label: C9 Entertainment; Formats: CD, digital download, streaming; Track listing: 1. "Bad Dream"; 2. "Off My Mind"; 3. "Wave"; 4. "Lost"; 5. "Genie in a Bottle"; 6. "20"; 7. "Ice"; 8. "In & Out"; 9. "Confession"; 10. "Here For You"	4	20	KOR: 103,885; JPN: 2,773
Japanese
Pinky Swear	Released: March 30, 2022 (JPN); Label: Warner Music Japan; Formats: CD, digital download, streaming; Track listing: 1. "All for You"; 2. "Wondering"; 3. "Pinky Swear"; 4. "Future Maker"; 5. "Labyrinth"; 6. "Win"; 7. "I'll Take You"; 8. "Plastic Umbrella"; 9. "With You"; 10. "Revival"	—	20	JPN: 3,508

=== Extended plays ===
List of extended plays, with selected chart positions and sales
Title	Details	Peak chart positions			Sales
Title	Details	KOR	FRA Dig.	JPN	Sales
Hello Chapter 1: Hello, Stranger	Released: July 23, 2019; Re-released: October 23, 2019 (JPN); Label: C9 Entertainment, Warner Music Japan; Formats: CD, digital download, streaming; Track listing: 1. "What You Wanted"; 2. "Movie Star"; 3. "Like It That Way"; 4. "Imagine"; 5. "The One"	2	200	25	KOR: 73,790; JPN: 9,296
Hello Chapter 2: Hello, Strange Place	Released: November 19, 2019; Label: C9 Entertainment; Formats: CD, digital download, streaming; Track listing: 1. "Blackout"; 2. "Numb"; 3. "Rewind"; 4. "Bystander"; 5. "Maybe I"	4	—	—	KOR: 81,729
Hello Chapter 3: Hello, Strange Time	Released: October 27, 2020; Label: C9 Entertainment; Formats: CD, digital download, streaming; Track listing: 1. "Move My Body"; 2. "Jungle"; 3. "Change Me"; 4. "Switch It Up"; 5. "Rebel"	6	—	—	KOR: 59,867
Hello Chapter Ø: Hello, Strange Dream	Released: February 2, 2021; Label: C9 Entertainment; Formats: CD, digital download, streaming; Track listing: 1. "Stairway to Heaven"; 2. "Cinema"; 3. "Round 2"; 4. "Young"; 5. "Everything"	1	—	—	KOR: 66,054
OK Episode 1: OK Not	Released: August 22, 2022; Label: C9 Entertainment; Formats: CD, digital download, streaming; Track listing: 1. "Without You"; 2. "458"; 3. "Bend the Rules"; 4. "Drown in Luv" (여름바다)	3	—	—	KOR: 99,722
OK Episode 2: I'm OK	Released: May 29, 2023; Label: C9 Entertainment; Formats: CD, digital download, streaming; Track listing: 1. "Back to Life"; 2. "Save Me, Kill Me"; 3. "Curtain Call"; 4. "Color"	3	—	30	KOR: 135,750; JPN: 2,179
Thunder Fever	Released: January 23, 2025; Label: C9 Entertainment; Formats: CD, digital download, streaming; Track listing: 1. "Bad Moves"; 2. "Thunder"; 3. "Lovers or Enemies"; 4. "My name is shadow" 5. "My Everlasting Sun"	4	—	—	KOR: 66,776
Go Chapter 1: Go Together	Released: September 8, 2025; Label: C9 Entertainment; Formats: CD, digital download, streaming	10	—	—	KOR: 64,672
"—" denotes releases that did not chart or were not released in that region.

=== Single albums ===
Title	Details	Peak chart positions	Sales
Title	Details	KOR	Sales
0 or 1	Released: January 24, 2024; Label: C9 Entertainment; Formats: CD, digital download, streaming; Track listing: 1. "Lovers or Enemies"; 2. "My Name Is Shadow" (그림자)	7	KOR: 72,284

=== Singles ===
List of singles, with selected chart positions, showing year released, and album name
Title	Year	Peak chart positions				Sales	Album
Title	Year	KOR Down.	KOR Billb.	JPN Oricon	JPN Hot	Sales	Album
Korean
"Movie Star"	2019	76	85	—	—	—N/a	Hello Chapter 1: Hello, Stranger
"Numb" (순수의 시대)	2019	54	—	—	—	—N/a	Hello Chapter 2: Hello, Strange Place
"Jungle"	2020	52	—	—	—	—N/a	Hello Chapter 3: Hello, Strange Time
"Cinema"	2021	22	—	—	—	—N/a	Hello Chapter Ø: Hello, Strange Dream
"Wave"	2021	29	—	—	—	—N/a	OK Prologue: Be OK
"458"	2022	22	—	—	—	—N/a	OK Episode 1: OK Not
"Save Me, Kill Me"	2023	37	—	—	—	—N/a	OK Episode 2: I'm OK
"Lovers or Enemies"	2024	21	—	—	—	—N/a	0 or 1
"Thunder"	2025	69	—	—	—	—N/a	Thunder Fever
"Wonder You" (니가궁금해)	2025	145	—	—	—	—N/a	Go Chapter 1: Go Together
Japanese
"My New World"	2019	—	—	—	—	—N/a	Hello Chapter 1: Hello, Stranger (Japanese version)
"Revival"	2020	—	—	8	61	JPN: 8,984 (Phy.)	Pinky Swear
"All for You"	2021	—	—	8	—	JPN: 6,630 (Phy.)	Pinky Swear
"Pinky Swear"	2022	—	—	—	—	—N/a	Pinky Swear
"—" denotes releases that did not chart or were not released in that region.

=== Soundtrack appearances ===
Title	Year	Album
Korean
"Win" (Korean ver.)	2020	The God of High School (Ending theme)
Japanese
"Win"	2020	The God of High School (Ending theme) and Pinky Swear

=== Promotional singles ===
Title	Year	Peak chart positions	Album
Title	Year	KOR Down.	Album
"Tesseract" (Promotional single for Universe)	2021	174	Non-album single

=== Other charted songs ===
Title	Year	Peak chart positions	Album
Title	Year	KOR Down.	Album
"Without You"	2022	41	OK Episode 1: OK Not
"Bend the Rules"	2022	48	OK Episode 1: OK Not
"Drown in Luv" (여름바다)	2022	44	OK Episode 1: OK Not

== Videography ==
=== Music videos ===
Year	Music video	Director(s)	Ref.
2019	"Movie Star"	Wooje Kim (ETUI)	
2019	"My New World"	Han Gui-taek	
2019	"Numb"	Wooje Kim (ETUI)	
2020	"Revival"	Wooje Kim (ETUI)	
2020	"Jungle"	Wooje Kim (ETUI)	
2021	"Cinema"	Wooje Kim (ETUI)	
2021	"All for You"	Wooje Kim (ETUI)	
2021	"Tesseract"	725 (SL8 Visual Lab)	
2021	"Wave"	Wooje Kim (ETUI)	
2022	"Pinky Swear"	Wooje Kim (ETUI)	
2022	"458	Wooje Kim (ETUI)	
2023	"Save Me, Kill me"	Gustavo Ku (ThirdEyeVideo)	
2024	"Lovers or Enemies"	Gustavo Ku (ThirdEyeVideo)	
2025	"Thunder"	Sunnyvisual	

== Filmography ==
=== Reality shows ===
Year	Title	Episodes	Notes	Ref.
2019	Hello CIX	10	pre-debut	
2020	Picnic of Seeds: CIX's Bucket List	8		
2021	GGULlog.zam CIX: The King of the Seas	8		
2021	Scientist CIX: Hello, Psycho	10		
2021	The CIX Million Dollar Kids	6		

== Shows and concerts ==
=== Headlining ===
- CIX 1st Concert Rebel (2022)
- CIX 2nd World Tour "Save me, Kill me" (2022–2023)

== Awards and nominations ==
Name of the award ceremony, year presented, award category, nominee(s) of the award, and the result of the nomination
Award ceremony	Year	Category	Nominee(s)/work(s)	Result	Ref.
APAN Music Awards	2020	Best Group – Male (Domestic)	CIX	Nominated	
APAN Music Awards	2020	Best Group – Male (Global)	CIX	Nominated	
Asia Artist Awards	2020	Popularity Award – Music	CIX	Nominated	
Asia Artist Awards	2021	Male Idol Group Popularity Award	CIX	Nominated	
Gaon Chart Music Awards	2020	New Artist of the Year – Album	CIX	Nominated	
Golden Disc Awards	2020	Rookie Artist of the Year	CIX	Nominated	
Hanteo Music Awards	2022	Post Generation Award	CIX	Won	
Hanteo Music Awards	2023	Artist of the Year (Bonsang)	CIX	Nominated	
Hanteo Music Awards	2023	Post Generation Award	CIX	Nominated	
Korea Culture and Entertainment Awards	2022	K-pop Singer Award	CIX	Won	
Korea First Brand Awards	2022	Male Idol Rising Star Award	CIX	Won	
MAMA Awards	2023	Worldwide Fans' Choice Top 10	CIX	Nominated	
MTV Europe Music Awards	2019	Best Korean Act	CIX	Nominated	
Seoul Music Awards	2020	QQ Music Most Popular K-Pop Artist Award	CIX	Nominated	
Seoul Music Awards	2021	Bonsang Award	Hello Chapter 3: Hello, Strange Time	Nominated	
Seoul Music Awards	2021	Popularity Award	CIX	Nominated	
Seoul Music Awards	2021	K-Wave Popularity Award	CIX	Nominated	
Soribada Best K-Music Awards	2020	Bonsang Award	CIX	Nominated	
Soribada Best K-Music Awards	2020	Male Popularity Award	CIX	Nominated	
The Fact Music Awards	2019	Fan N Star Choice Award	CIX	Nominated	
The Fact Music Awards	2020	Fan N Star Choice Award	CIX	Nominated	
The Fact Music Awards	2021	Fan N Star Choice Award	CIX	Nominated	
V Live Awards	2019	Global Rookie Top 5	CIX	Won	
V Live Awards	2019	The Most Loved Artist	CIX	Nominated	
Dream Concert Awards	2024	30th Anniversary Dream Concert – Hall of Fame – Dream Global	CIX	Won	
ENA K-POP UP Best Music and Fans Choice Awards	2025	ENA Fans Choice	CIX	Won	
ENA K-POP UP Best Music and Fans Choice Awards	2025	ENA Best Music Award	CIX	Won	
