= Bae Jin-young =

South Korean singer (born 2000)

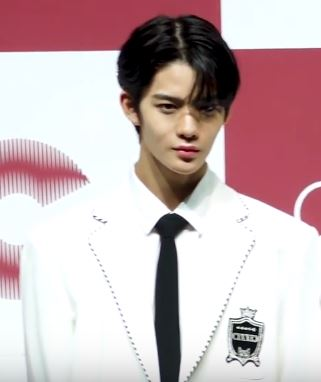
- Bae Jin-young in November 2019
- Born: May 10, 2000 (age 26); Seoul, South Korea
- Occupations: Singer; actor
- Relatives: Bae Seo-chan (younger brother)
- Musical career
- Genre: K-pop
- Instrument: Vocals
- Years active: 2017–present
- Labels: C9; YMC (Note: As a member of Wanna One only.); Swing; Aura
- Formerly of: Wanna One; CIX

Korean name
- Hangul: 배진영
- Hanja: 裵珍映
- RR: Bae Jinyeong
- MR: Pae Chinyŏng

Bae Jin-young (Korean: 배진영; born May 10, 2000) is a South Korean singer and actor. He is a former member of South Korean boy groups CIX and Wanna One, after finishing tenth in the final rankings of Produce 101 season 2. Following Wanna One's disbandment, Bae Jinyoung debuted in CIX in July 2019 and departed from the group after his contract expired in August 2024.

== Early life ==
Bae Jin-young was born on May 10, 2000, in Seoul, South Korea. He attended Lila Art High School.

== Career ==
=== Pre-debut ===
Bae Jin-young was a trainee under C9 Entertainment for 10 months.

=== 2017–2018: Produce 101 and Wanna One ===
Bae Jinyoung participated in the South Korean boy band survival show Produce 101 season 2, which aired by Mnet from April 7 to June 16, 2017. Bae Jinyoung quickly gained immense popularity before the show aired as his PR-video of him doing his "Baebastic" introduction went viral. Bae's infamous Aegyo-set "ttak-ttak" was first revealed in the video, and the PR-video is the first to reach 10 million views on Naver TV, and is today the most viewed PR-video out of all existing in the four seasons of Produce 101. In the final episode, Bae Jinyoung ranked at 10th place with 807,749 in-real time votes and thus earning a spot in the winning group, the project boy group Wanna One managed by YMC Entertainment. Bae officially debuted in Wanna One during Wanna One Premier Show-Con on August 7, 2017, at Gocheok Sky Dome with the EP mini-album 1×1=1 (To Be One). The venue is the largest ever used for an idol-group's debut event, with the reported number of attendees exceeding 20,000 people.

While promoting in Wanna One, Bae was critically acclaimed for his authority on stage and remarkable growth since competing in Produce 101 (season 2). Bae received 100 notable awards with Wanna One, reflecting the group's musical achievements and popularity, and endorsed for 25 different brands in various commercial films.

In connection with Wanna One's disbandment, the group held their final concert, "Therefore", which was held across four days, starting from January 24 to the last show on January 27, 2019, at Gocheok Sky Dome in Seoul, where the group held their debut showcase. The final concert marked Bae Jinyoung's last appearance as a Wanna One member.

=== 2019–present: Solo and acting activities, CIX and group departure ===
Following the disbandment of Wanna One, C9 Entertainment announced Bae Jinyoung's 1st Asia fan-meeting tour, "IM YOUNG", on February 27. The tour took place at locations in South Korea, Philippines, Japan, Singapore, Thailand, Hong Kong and Taiwan.

Bae Jinyoung debuted as a soloist on April 26 with his self-composed single album, Hard To Say Goodbye.

In July 2019, Bae debuted as a center, face, and lead dancer of boy group CIX, under his label agency C9 Entertainment.

On July 30, 2021, it was announced that Bae Jinyoung was selected as male lead in WHYNOT Media Original Drama User Not Found. He will play the character of Shin Yi-jun, a popular high schooler, who seems fierce on the outside but is actually delicate. It will be aired in November 2021.

In 2022, Bae made his big screen debut with the Thai-Singapore joint film The Antique Shop, which was released on June 2, 2022.

On August 5, 2024, C9 Entertainment announced the departure of Bae Jin-young from the group CIX after his contract with the company had ended on August 1. Later in December 2024, Bae signed a contract with Aura Entertainment.

== Discography ==
=== Extended play ===
Title	EP details	Peak chart positions	Sales
Title	EP details	KOR	Sales
Still Young	Released: October 14, 2025; Label: Aura Entertainment; Formats: CD, digital download, streaming	21	KOR: 11,301

=== Single album ===
Title	Album details	Peak chart positions	Sales
Title	Album details	KOR	Sales
Hard to Say Goodbye	Released: April 26, 2019; Label: C9 Entertainment; Formats: CD, digital download, streaming; Track listing: 1. Hard to Say Goodbye (끝을 받아들이기가 어려워); 2. Hard to Say Goodbye (끝을 받아들이기가 어려워) (Inst.)	3	KOR: 63,987

==== As lead artist ====
Title	Year	Peak chart positions	Album
Title	Year	KOR Down.	Album
"Hard to Say Goodbye" (끝을 받아들이기가 어려워)	2019	78	Hard to Say Goodbye
"Round & Round"	2025	142	Still Young

=== Other releases ===
Title	Year	Peak chart positions	Album
Title	Year	KOR	Album
Promotional
"I Believe" (with Kim Yo-han)	2020	—	Non-album single
"—" denotes releases that did not chart or were not released in that region.

== Filmography ==
=== Film ===
Year	Title	Role	Notes	Ref.
2022	The Antique Shop	Song	Singapore–Thai film	

=== Web series ===
Year	Title	Role	Ref.
2021	User Not Found	Shin Yi-jun	

=== Television show ===
Year	Title	Role	Notes	Ref.
2017	Produce 101 Season 2	Contestant	Finished at tenth place	

== Awards and nominations ==
Name of the award ceremony, year presented, category, nominee of the award, and the result of the nomination
Award ceremony	Year	Category	Nominee / Work	Result	Ref.
Seoul Webfest Film Festival	2022	Best Actor	User Not Found	Nominated	
