= C9 Entertainment =

South Korean entertainment company

- Native name: C9 엔터테인먼트
- Industry: Entertainment
- Genre: K-pop; R&B; Hip hop; Rock
- Founded: 2012
- Founder: Kim Dae-soon
- Headquarters: 41 Dongmak-ro 3-gil, Mapo-gu, Seoul, South Korea
- Key people: Lee Jae-young, CEO
- Services: Music Production; Artists Management
- Parent: CI Entertainment (2018–present)
- Website: c9ent.co.kr

C9 Entertainment (Korean: C9 엔터테인먼트) is a South Korean entertainment agency founded in 2012 by Kim Dae-soon. The company operates as a record label, talent agency, music production company and event management. The company is home to artists including Younha, Lee Seok Hoon, CIX, Poetic Narrator, and Epex.

== History ==
In 2012, C9 was previously founded as a one-man agency of singer Younha named Wealive and later the one-man agency signed a partnership with hip-hop label Alive. In July 2015, Wealive-Alive merged with indie label Realive and then officially launched their company, C9 Entertainment.

In 2016, C9 Entertainment merged with GG Entertainment which manages Eugene, Lee See Eun, and Jung Ui Chul. They also signed a partnership with Benq Korea on their gaming brand, Zowie. In the same year, soloist Juniel signed C9 Entertainment.

In March 2017, C9 moved their office from Gangnam to a new building in Mapo.

In August 2017, C9 Entertainment debuted their first girl group Good Day. All the members (except Chaesol) were previously introduced to media during 2016 C9's trainees showcase.

On November 2, 2018, CI Entertainment's CEO had acquired 100 percent stake in C9. However, they still operate separately and CI Ent moved their office to the same building as C9 Entertainment.

In January 2019, SG Wannabe member Lee Seok-hoon signed with C9. On July 23, 2019, C9 debuted their first boy group CIX. In November 2019, C9 began introducing their upcoming seven-member girl group as C9 Girlz, including five member from their previous girl group Good Day: Jeewon (formerly Jiwon), Chaesol, Sunn (formerly Viva), Belle (formerly Lucky), YeAh (formerly Haeun) and two trainee Seline and Semi. On January 14, 2020, C9 Girlz's official group name was revealed to be Cignature and will be managed by C9 Entertainment's new music label, J9 Entertainment. On February 4, 2020, Cignature made their debut with the single "Nun Nu Nan Na".

In March 2021, C9 began introducing the members for their upcoming eight-member boy group C9 Rookies, later renamed as Epex. On June 8, 2021, Epex made their debut with the EP Bipolar Pt.1: Prelude of Anxiety.

In June 2025, C9 introduced their upcoming first multinational seven-member boy group under pre-debut name C9 Rookies and plans to debut in 2026. The boy group's official name was later revealed as Naze.

== Artists ==
Soloists

- Younha
- Lee Seok-hoon

Groups

- Epex

Duos

- Poetic Narrator

== Former artists ==
Recording artists

- Jung Joon-young (2016–2018)
- Olltii
- Drug Restaurant (2016–2018)
- Pia
- GroovyRoom
- JJK
- Lugoh
- ByeBye Badman
- Cho Duckhwan
- Good Day (2017–2019)
- Jacoby Planet
- Cheetah (2014–2020)
- Cignature (2020–2024)
  - Ye Ah (2017–2021)
  - Sunn (2017–2021)
- Juniel (2016–2021)
- CIX
  - Bae Jin-young (2019–2024)

Actors/actresses

- Eugene (2016–2018)
- Han Eunseo (2016–2018)
- Kim Chae-yoon
- Son Narae
- Yi So-jung
- Lee See-eun
- Choi Byung-mo
- Kang Nam-gyu
- Jung Gyu-woon (2017–2020)
