= U-KISS discography =

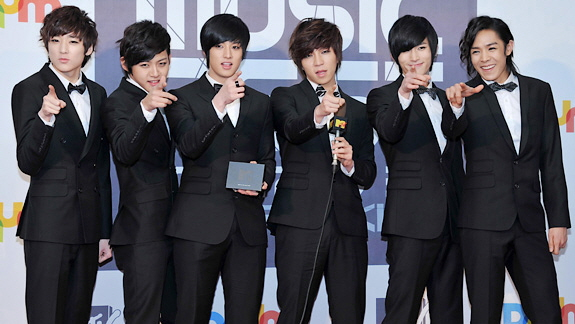
- U-KISS in 2011
- Studio albums: 11
- Extended plays: 19
- Live albums: 7
- Compilation albums: 2
- Singles: 35
- Video albums: 5
- Music videos: 30

South Korean boy band U-KISS has released eleven studio albums, two compilation albums, nineteen extended plays, seven live albums, thirty-five singles, five video albums and thirty music videos.

== Albums ==
=== Studio albums ===
Title	Album details	Peak chart positions			Sales
Title	Album details	KOR	JPN	US World	Sales
Only One	Released: February 3, 2010; Label: NH Media; Format: CD, digital download	1	—	—	KOR: 27,030
Neverland	Released: August 31, 2011; Label: NH Media; Format: CD, digital download	6 (Note: The album appeared on the Gaon Album Chart in 2013 at number 6 for the week of April 21–27, 2013.)	—	—	KOR: 1,228 (Note: Album sales for Neverland are from 2013 only.)
A Shared Dream	Released: February 29, 2012; Label: Avex Trax; Format: CD, digital download	—	5	—	JPN: 13,138
Collage	Released: March 7, 2013; Label: NH Media; Format: CD, digital download	2	—	12	KOR: 19,440
Inside of Me	Released: July 24, 2013; Label: Avex Trax; Format: CD, digital download	—	8	—	JPN: 25,000
Memories	Released: March 19, 2014; Label: Avex Trax; Format: CD, digital download	—	15	—	JPN: 8,504
Action	Released: March 18, 2015; Label: Avex Trax; Format: CD, digital download	—	4	—	JPN: 20,297
One Shot One Kill	Released: March 23, 2016; Label: Avex Trax; Format: CD, digital download	—	6	—	JPN: 12,988
U-KISS Solo & Unit ALBUM	Released: March 15, 2017; Label: Avex Trax; Format: CD, digital download	—	7	—	JPN: 7,813
Link	Released: March 21, 2018; Label: Avex Trax; Format: CD, digital download	—	4	—	JPN: 8,449
Glory	Released: December 19, 2018; Label: Avex Trax; Format: CD, digital download	—	10	—	JPN: 12,217 (Billboard Japan : 13,941)
"—" denotes releases that did not chart or were not released in that region.

=== Compilation albums ===
Title	Album details	Peak chart positions		Sales
Title	Album details	KOR	JPN	Sales
Japanese
First Kiss	Released: December 10, 2010; Label: IMX; Format: CD, digital download	—	21	JPN: 10,993
U-KISS Japan Best Collection 2011–2016	Released: December 21, 2016; Label: Avex Trax; Format: CD, digital download	—	8	JPN: 14,939

== Extended plays ==
Title	Details	Peak chart positions			Sales
Title	Details	KOR	JPN	US World	Sales
Korean
New Generation	Released: September 3, 2008; Label: NH Media; Format: CD, digital download	—	—	—	No data
Bring It Back 2 Old School	Release: February 3, 2009; Label: NH Media; Format: CD, digital download	—	—	—	No data
ContiUKiss	Release: November 6, 2009; Label: NH Media; Format: CD, digital download	—	—	—	No data
Break Time	Release: October 4, 2010; Label: NH Media; Format: CD, digital download	3	—	—	KOR: 20,389
Bran New Kiss	Release: March 30, 2011; Label: NH Media; Format: CD, digital download	2	—	—	KOR: 20,216
DoraDora	Release: April 25, 2012; Label: NH Media; Format: CD, digital download	—	79	12	JPN: 3,411 (Korean version)
The Special to Kiss Me	Release: June 5, 2012; Label: NH Media; Format: CD, digital download	7 (Note: The album appeared on the Gaon Album Chart in 2013 at number 7 for the week of April 21–27, 2013.)	82	14	KOR: 1,068 (Note: Album sales for The Special to Kiss Me are from 2013 only.); JPN: 2,134 (Korean version)
Stop Girl	Released: September 20, 2012; Label: NH Media; Format: CD, digital download	—	76	14	JPN: 4,246 (Korean version)
Moments	Released: October 31, 2013; Label: NH Media; Format: CD, digital download	3	—	—	KOR: 19,003
Mono Scandal	Released: June 2, 2014; Label: NH Media; Format: CD, digital download	3	—	14	KOR: 13,924
Always	Released: January 23, 2015; Label: NH Media; Format: CD, digital download	3	—	—	KOR: 11,146
Stalker	Released: June 7, 2016; Label: NH Media; Format: CD, digital download	4	86	11	KOR: 11,573; JPN: 676
Play List	Released: June 28, 2023; Label: Tango Music; Format: CD, digital download	33	—	—	KOR: 7,158
Let's Get Started	Released: June 25, 2024; Label: Tango Music; Format: CD, digital download	29	—	—	KOR: 5,995
Japanese
Bran New Kiss	Release: August 24, 2011; Label: Avex Trax; Format: CD, digital download	—	7	—	JPN: 14,582
DoraDora + The Special To Kiss Me	Release: September 26, 2012; Label: Avex Trax; Format: CD, digital download	—	43	—	JPN: 6,888
Neverland	Release: January 23, 2013; Label: Avex Trax; Format: CD, digital download	—	68	—	No data
Stop Girl	Release: January 23, 2013; Label: Avex Trax; Format: CD, digital download	—	73	—	No data
The Christmas Album	Release: December 23, 2015; Label: Avex Trax; Format: CD, digital download	—	12	—	JPN: 8,592
"—" denotes releases that did not chart or were not released in that region.

== Singles ==
Title	Year	Peak chart positions					Sales	Album
Title	Year	KOR	KOR Hot.	JPN	JPN Hot.	US World	Sales	Album
Korean - digital -
"Not Young"	2008	—	—	—	—	—		New Generation
"I Like You"	2009	—	—	—	—	—		Bring It Back 2 Old School
"Talk To Me"	2009	—	—	—	—	—		Bring It Back 2 Old School
"Man Man Ha Ni" (만만하니)	2009	35	—	—	—	—		ContiUKiss
"Bingeul Bingeul" (빙글빙글)	2010	13	—	—	—	—	KOR: 1,014,296	Only One
"What"	2010	—	—	—	—	—		Only One
"Shut Up!"	2010	70	—	—	—	—		Break Time
"0330"	2011	27	—	—	—	—	KOR: 675,630	Brand New Kiss
"Neverland"	2011	37	51	—	—	4	KOR: 671,684	Neverland
"For Kiss Me"	2011	36	39	—	—	—	KOR: 213,760	For Kiss Me (single)
"Doradora"	2012	73	66	—	—	4	KOR: 85,911	DoraDora
"Believe"	2012	70	79	—	—	—	KOR: 61,625	The Special To Kiss Me
"Cinderella"	2012	94	—	—	—	—	KOR: 30,203	Cinderella (single)
"Stop Girl"	2012	93	86	—	—	8	KOR: 61,310	Stop Girl
"Gangsta Boy"	2012	97	—	—	—	—	KOR: 22,631	Gangsta Boy (single)
"Standing Still"	2013	86	82	—	—	6	KOR: 21,537	Collage
"She's Mine"	2013	167	—	—	—	17		Moments
"Quit Playing"	2014	111	—	—	—	11		Mono Scandal
"Playground"	2015	198	—	—	—	—		Always
"Stalker"	2016	—	—	—	—	—		Stalker
"Ready For U"	2017	—	—	—	—	—		Ready For U (single)
"The Wonderful Escape" (갈래!)	2023	— (Note: "The Wonderful Escape" did not enter the Circle Digital Chart, but debuted and peaked at number 122 on the component Download Chart.)	—	—	—	—		Play List
"Stay With Me" (너는 내 모든 곳에 있어)	2024	— (Note: "Stay With Me" did not enter the Circle Digital Chart, but debuted and peaked at number 143 on the component Download Chart.)	—	—	—	—		Let's Get Started
Japanese - physical -
"Tick Tack"	2011	—	—	5	46	—	JPN: 41,989+	A Shared Dream
"Forbidden Love"	2012	—	—	10	—	—	JPN: 30,001+	A Shared Dream
"Dear My Friend"	2012	—	—	8	34	—	JPN: 25,000+	Inside øf Me
"One of You"	2012	—	—	7	30	—	JPN: 30,449+	Inside øf Me
"Distance..."	2012	—	—	5	39	—	JPN: 30,489+	Inside øf Me
"Alone"	2013	—	—	4	11	—	JPN: 29,000+	Inside øf Me
"Fall In Love/Shape Of Your Heart"	2013	—	—	4	37	—	JPN: 27,422+	Memories
"Break Up"	2014	—	—	5	52	—	JPN: 23,118+	Memories
"Love On U"	2014	—	—	7	31	—	JPN: 21,188+	Action
"Sweetie"	2014	—	—	2	60	—	JPN: 33,259+	Action
"Stay Gold"	2015	—	—	3	60	—	JPN: 44,418	One Shot One Kill
"Kissing to Feel"	2016	—	—	4	8	—	JPN: 34,007	One Shot One Kill
"Panic!"	2016	—	—	4	10	—	JPN: 28,014	U-KISS Japan Best Collection 2011–2016
"Fly"	2017	—	—	5	8	—	JPN: 12,444 (Billboard Japan : 35,582)	Link
"Scandal"	2018	—	—	4	8	—	JPN: 19,783 (Billboard Japan : 31,855)	Glory
uBEAT / Kiseop&Hoon / Soohyun&Hoon / UX1 (sub-unit)
"Should Have Treated You Better" (as uBEAT)	2013	—	—	—	—	—		Should Have Treated You Better
"Train/Milk Tea" (as Kiseop&Hoon)	2018	—	—	—	—	—		Train/Milk Tea
"Someday Somewhere" (as Kiseop&Hoon)	2019	—	—	—	—	—		Someday Somewhere
"I Wish" (as Soohyun&Hoon)	2021	—	—	—	—	—		Non-album singles
"Halo" (as UX1)	2025	—	—	—	—	—		Non-album singles
"Winterland" (as UX1)	2025	—	—	—	—	—		Non-album singles
"—" denotes releases that did not chart or were not released in that region. Gaon Chart ranks only the top 100 from mid-2014 afterwards. The Billboard Korea K-Pop Hot 100 was discontinued in July 2014.

== Other charted songs ==
Title	Year	Peak chart positions			Album
Title	Year	KOR	KOR Hot.	US World	Album
"Without You"	2010	38	—	—	Only One
"What (New Version)"	2010	69	—	—	Non-album single
"Someday"	2011	107	100	—	Neverland
"Amazing"	2012	111	91	—	DoraDora
"Tick Tock (Out of Time)"	2012	—	—	14	DoraDora
"Te Amo"	2012	122	94	—	The Special To Kiss Me
"—" denotes releases that did not chart or were not released in that region.

== Videography ==
=== Video albums ===
==== Live albums ====
Title	Album details	Peak chart positions		Sales
Title	Album details	JPN DVD	JPN BD	Sales
Korean
U-KISS 1st Kiss Tour in Manila DVD	Released: April 2, 2011 (PH); Label: NH Media, Universal Records (Philippines); Format: DVD	—	—	PH: 2,000+
Japanese
U-KISS First Kiss Live in Tokyo and Osaka DVD	Released: April 29, 2011; Label: NH Media, IMX; Format: DVD	147	—	
Seoul Train with U-KISS	Released: April 29, 2011; Label: NH Media, IMX; Format: DVD	77	—	
U-KISS 1st Japan Live Tour 2012	Released: September 26, 2012; Label: Avex Trax; Format: DVD	7	—	
Live in Budokan	Released: January 1, 2013; Label: Avex Trax; Format: DVD, Blu-ray	42	58	JPN: 3,547+
U-KISS Japan Live Tour 2013 ～Inside of Me～	Released: January 1, 2014; Label: Avex Trax; Format: DVD, Blu-ray	33	30	
U-KISS Japan Live Tour 2014 ～Memories～ Returns in Budokan	Released: November 26, 2014; Label: Avex Trax; Format: DVD, Blu-ray	16	48	

==== DVD/Blu-ray video ====
Title	Album details	Peak chart positions	Sales
Title	Album details	JPN DVD	Sales
Japanese
U-KISS Days in Japan Vol. 1	Released: March 28, 2012; Label: NH Media, Avex Trax; Format: DVD	28	JPN: 3,379+
U-KISS Days in Japan Vol. 2 -Record of 2012-	Released: March 27, 2013; Label: Avex Trax; Format: DVD	43	
U-KISS Days in Japan Vol. 3	Released: March 19, 2014; Label: Avex Trax; Format: DVD	26	
U-KISS Days in Japan Vol. 4	Released: March 4, 2015; Label: Avex Trax; Format: DVD	13	
U-KISS Days in Japan Vol. 6	Released: March 22, 2017; Label: Avex Trax; Format: DVD	9	JPN: 1,539

=== Music videos ===
List of music videos, with directors, showing year released
Year	Title	Director(s)	Notes
Korean
2008	"Not Young"	Unknown	
2009	"I Like You"	Unknown	
2009	"Man Man Ha Ni"	Joo hui seon	
2010	"Bingeul Bingeul"	Joo hui seon	
2010	"시끄러!!"	Unknown	
2011	"Always"	Unknown	
2011	"0330"	Kim Young-hoon	
2011	"Neverland"	Eun You Kim	
2012	"DoraDora"	Eun You Kim	
2012	"Believe"	Eun You Kim	
2012	"Stop Girl"	Jang Pil	
2013	"Standing Still"	Jang Pil	
2013	"She's Mine"	Jang Pil	
2014	"Only You"	Unknown	
2014	"Don't Flirt"	Lee Duk Hee	
2015	"Playground"	Jimmy	
2016	"Stalker"	Kim Yong-min	
Japanese
2011	"Tick Tack"	Eun You Kim	
2012	"A Shared Dream"	Eun You Kim	
2012	"Forbidden Love"	Eun You Kim	
2012	"Dear My Friend"	Unknown	
2012	"One of You"	Jang Pil	
2012	"Distance"	Jang Pil	
2013	"Alone"	Jang Pil	
2013	"Inside of Me"	Jang Pil	
2013	"Fall In Love/Shape of Your Heart"	Jang Pil	
2014	"Break Up"	Jang Pil	
2014	"Love On U"	Unknown	
2014	"Sweetie"	Jimmy	
2015	"Action"	Jimmy	
2016	"PaNiC!"	Yoo Sung-kyun	

== uBEAT ==
uBEAT discography
- Extended plays: 1
- Singles: 2

uBEAT is the first sub-unit formed by U-KISS. The unit consists of Eli and AJ. They released their debut mini-album featuring fellow group member Kevin.

=== Extended plays ===
Title	Album details	Peak chart positions		Sales
Title	Album details	KOR	JPN	Sales
Should Have Treated You Better	Released: April 22, 2013; Format: CD, DVD, digital download	3	—	KOR: 9,478+
"—" denotes releases that did not chart or were not released in that territory.

=== Singles ===
Title	Year	Peak chart positions		Album
Title	Year	KOR Gaon	JPN Oricon	Album
"Should Have Treated You Better"	2013	103	—	Should Have Treated You Better
"It's Been A Long Time"	2013	—	—	Should Have Treated You Better
"—" denotes releases that did not chart or were not released in that territory.
