= The Special to Kiss Me =

The Special To Kiss Me

EP by U-KISS
- Released: June 7, 2012
- Recorded: 2012
- Genre: K-pop, dance-pop
- Length: 19:30
- Language: Korean
- Label: NH Media, Neowiz Internet, Windmill Media; WMCD-0131

U-KISS chronology
DoraDora (2012)	The Special To Kiss Me (2012)	Stop Girl (2012)

Singles from The Special To Kiss Me
- 1. "Te Amo" Released: May 31, 2012; 2. "Believe" Released: June 9, 2012

The Special To Kiss Me commonly stylized as The Special To KISSME is the first album made completely for fans by the South Korean boy band UKISS. The music video was released on June 9, 2012. .

== Release ==
Hoon and AJ were the first to get their picture teasers released on May 31, 2012. It was then followed by Soohyun, whose picture was released on the same day. The next day Eli's picture was released and then the following day Kiseop's was. Kevin and Dongho had picture teasers released soon after. The music video for the title song "Believe" was released on June 9, 2012. The digital album was released on June 5, followed by the physical album release on June 7.

The song "Te Amo" was a single that was released ahead of time on May 31, 2012. It is a "fierce and fresh new track that echoes the sounds of the saxophone and it allows listeners to feel as though they’ve escaped to an exciting, upbeat South American club."

== Track listing ==
The EP's tracks are as follows:

No.	Title	Lyrics	Music	Length
1.	"Believe" (Title)	AJ	AJ, 동네형	3:10
2.	"Te Amo"	Nassun & ZENDA FAKTERI (BEATAMIN)	Nassun & ZENDA FAKTERI (BEATAMIN)	3:06
3.	"인연인가 봐" (It Must Be Fate)	HAN, Kim Dongyeol, and Min Youngjae	HAN, Kim Dongyeol, and Min Youngjae	3:25
4.	"Let's Get"	Lee Shinsung, AJ, Henry	K-NOTE, Lee Chulwon	3:33
5.	"Believe" (Instrumental)	-	AJ	3:10
6.	"Te Amo" (Instrumental)	-	Nassun & ZENDA FAKTERI (BEATAMIN)	3:06
Total length:				19:30

== Charts ==
Chart (2012)	Peak position
mnet	11
Billboard Korea	79
Gaon	69
