= 2012 Idol Star Athletics – Swimming Championships =

The 2012 Idol Star Athletics – Swimming Championships (Korean: 아이돌 스타 육상-수영 선수권 대회) was held at Jamsil Arena in Seoul, South Korea on January 8, 2012 and was broadcast on MBC on January 24, 2012 (2 episodes). At the championships a total number of 10 events in athletics and 2 events in swimming were contested: 6 by men and 6 by women. There were a total number of 150 participating K-pop singers and celebrities, divided into 16 teams.

== Results ==
=== Men ===
Athletics

Event	Gold	Silver	Bronze
50 m	Team E Baro (B1A4)	Team K Dongjun (ZE:A)	Team C Hoya (Infinite)
50 m Hurdles	Team K Dongjun (ZE:A)	Team C Woohyun (Infinite)	Team F Donghyun (Boyfriend)
4 X 50 m (Racewalking relay)	Team A Yoseob (Beast); Dongwoon (Beast); Doojoon (Beast); Junhyung (Beast)	Team B & Team G Sangchu (Mighty Mouth); Kim Kyung-jin; Kim Jong-min (Koyote); Shorry J (Mighty Mouth)	Team M G.O (MBLAQ); Thunder (MBLAQ); Mir (MBLAQ); Lee Joon (MBLAQ)
4 X 100 m	Team C L (Infinite); Dongwoo (Infinite); Woohyun (Infinite); Hoya (Infinite)	Team K Lee Hoo (ZE:A); Hyungsik (ZE:A); Heechul (ZE:A); Dongjun (ZE:A)	Team D Dongho (U-KISS); AJ (U-KISS); Kiseop (U-KISS); Hoon (U-KISS)
High jump	Team H Niel (Teen Top)	Team H Ricky (Teen Top)	
High jump	Team H Niel (Teen Top)	Team E Sandeul (B1A4)	

Swimming

- Special appearance and swimming performance by Choi Kyu-woong.

Event	Gold	Silver	Bronze
50 m freestyle	Team B Shorry J (Mighty Mouth)	Team Y Daniel (Dalmatian)	Team Z Marco

=== Women ===
Athletics

Event	Gold	Silver	Bronze
100 m	Team J Gaeun (Dal Shabet)	Team K Eunji (Nine Muses)	Team F Bora (Sistar)
50 m Hurdles	Team L Bomi (Apink)	Team F Bora (Sistar)	Team J Gaeun (Dal Shabet)
4 X 50 m (Racewalking relay)	Team F Bora (Sistar); Hyolyn (Sistar); Dasom (Sistar); Soyou (Sistar)	Team M Kang Min-kyung (Davichi); Qri (T-ara); Lee Hae-ri (Davichi); Hyomin (T-ara)	Team A G.NA; Jihyun (4Minute); Jiyoon (4Minute); Sohyun (4Minute)
4 X 100 m	Team F Hyolyn (Sistar); Dasom (Sistar); Soyou (Sistar); Bora (Sistar)	Team K Eunji (Nine Muses); Yewon (Jewelry); Kyungri (Nine Muses); Lee Sem (Nine Muses)	Team C Jooyeon (After School); Kahi (After School); Lizzy (After School); Uee (After School)
High jump	Team C Kahi (After School)	Team L NS Yoonji	Team I Minah (Girl's Day)

Swimming

Event	Gold	Silver	Bronze
50 m freestyle	Team E Woori (Rainbow)	Team I T-ae (Rania)	Team K Minha (Nine Muses)

== Ratings ==
Episode #	Original broadcast date	TNmS Ratings		AGB Nielsen Ratings	
Episode #	Original broadcast date	Nationwide	Seoul National Capital Area	Nationwide	Seoul National Capital Area
1	January 24, 2012	9.8%	13.3%	10.1%	12.0%
2	January 24, 2012	11.3%	14.2%	12.4%	14.6%
