= Break Time (EP) =

BREAK TIME

EP by U-KISS
- Released: October 4, 2010
- Recorded: 2010
- Genre: Pop, electropop
- Length: 21:52
- Label: NH Media, Sony Music; S90282C

U-KISS chronology
Only One (2010)	BREAK TIME (2010)	Bran New Kiss (2011)

Singles from Break Time
- 1. "Shut Up!!" Released: October 4, 2010

Break Time is the fourth Korean extended play by South Korean band U-KISS, released on October 4, 2010. The lead single was "Shut Up!!". It is the last EP by U-KISS to feature members Alexander Lee and Kim Ki-bum.

== Release and reception ==
The physical CD was released in South Korea October 4, 2010. Digital downloads were available worldwide that same day. It proceeded to be released in the Philippines March 24, 2011. The original single for the EP was originally supposed to be "Light It Up", composed by Kim Tae-wan, but upon hearing Kim Tae-hyun's "Shut Up!!" (시끄러!!; Siggeureo!!), the group shifted to use the latter instead. The song was recorded at More Than Present's studio in Seoul, Korea in August, 2010, and is based on hardcore electronic sounds while emphasizing performance factors.

U-KISS began promotions of Break Time with a performance of "Shut Up!!" on Mnet's M!Countdown on October 7, the same day the song's music video was released. The setting for the video is a train station, with U-KISS on the platform. It begins with member Eli riding a motorcycle while chasing a woman. It then shifts to Shin Dongho sitting on one side while singing his part. It also features a trio-rap from Alexander, Ki-bum, and Eli Kim who chase a woman. The original version of the music video was flagged by YouTube for content inappropriate to minors, due to scenes in which Kibum, Kiseop, and Kevin are shirtless and all members appear with a woman. A less graphic version of the video was revealed on October 8, and a new version for TV broadcast was released on October 29.

"Shut Up!!" went to number 70 on the Gaon Weekly Digital Singles Chart, while the Break Time EP made it to number 3 on the Gaon Weekly Albums Chart.

On February 29, 2012 a Japanese version of the "Shut Up!!" was released as a part of U-KISS's first Japanese album, A Shared Dream.

== Track listing ==
No.	Title	Length
1.	"Before Yesterday (Intro)"	0:53
2.	"시끄러!!" (Shut Up!!)	3:13
3.	"Light It Up"	3:46
4.	"Rock Ya' Body"	3:26
5.	"Avatar"	3:50
6.	"시끄러!!" (Instrumental)	3:13
7.	"Light It Up" (Instrumental)	3:46
Total length:		21:52

== Charts ==
Chart	Peak position
Gaon Weekly album chart	3
Gaon Monthly album chart	10
Gaon Yearly album chart	77

== Sales and certifications ==
Chart	Amount
Gaon physical sales	19,583 (2010); 806 (2011)

== Release history ==
Country	Date	Format	Label
South Korea	October 4, 2010	CD, Digital download	NH Media; Sony Music
Worldwide	October 4, 2010	Digital download	NH Media; Sony Music
Philippines	March 24, 2011	CD	Sony Music
