= Alexander Lee (entertainer) =

Hong Kong singer and rapper (born 1988)

- Born: Alexander Lee Eusebio; July 29, 1988 (age 38); British Hong Kong
- Education: De Anza College, Korea University
- Occupations: Singer; rapper; actor; presenter
- Years active: 2008–present
- Agent: Wellmaking
- Musical career
- Genres: Pop; R&B; Kpop
- Instrument: Vocals
- Labels: NH Media Entertainment; MPlus Entertainment; Left Profile; White Wind Entertainment
- Member of: U-KISS

Alexander Lee Eusebio (born July 29, 1988), professionally known as Alexander Lee or Alexander, is a South Korean rapper, singer and actor, born in Hong Kong to a Portuguese-Hongkonger father and a South Korean mother, he is a member of the South Korean boy band U-KISS. In 2017, he debuted in the Philippines as the main character in the 105-episode television series My Korean Jagiya. He is currently active as a television host on Arirang TV's #StyleCast 2017 and is also a daily radio host for the Double Date show on tbs eFM.

== Music ==
=== 2008–2011: U-KISS ===
Lee made his debut as a member of South Korean boy band U-KISS in 2008 and released four mini albums and one full album with U-KISS.

During his time with the band, he also featured in other singers' works; the rap for Brave Brothers' "Finally" and Hye Ji's "Your Love".

On February 23, 2011, NH Media confirmed and released a statement that Lee and his bandmate Ki Bum had left the group. Lee's last released song with the group is "Shut Up!!", the lead single from their fourth EP, Break Time.

On July 28, 2020, Lee revealed in an interview that he was kicked out of U-KISS due to his lack of popularity.

=== 2011–present: Solo career ===
Shortly after his departure from U-Kiss, Lee took part in the "Father, I Honor You" Praise Concert in Hong Kong in June, singing gospel song "아주먼 옛날" (A Long Long Time Ago) and "Nobody". In October, he took part in and performed the song "Looking for the Day" with Brian Joo and Pastor Johnny from 3rd Wave.

He then released his first single "I Just" in December, and made his solo debut through a showcase held at the Akasaka Blitz in Tokyo, Japan. In the same month, he held a showcase in Kuala Lumpur, Malaysia, performing songs from his new album; "I Just", "Oh! Baby", and popular songs like "That Man" (Korean drama Secret Garden OST) and even a classic Mandopop song, "情非得已" (Taiwanese drama Meteor Garden soundtrack).

In March 2012, he released "Kimchi Song" for the OST of Channel A drama Immortal Classic/불후의 명작.

He then held a fan meeting in Singapore, "Specially for Xanderettes" in July 2012, where he also performed songs "I Just", "Oh! Baby", "Bad Girl" and "The Kimchi Song" from the Immortal Masterpiece OST.

In 2013, Lee and Calvin Chen both sang the OST of Singaporean film "3 Peas in a Pod", "You and I" and" 我与你" in Korean and Mandarin, respectively.

== Acting ==
In 2012, he ventured into acting through a Korean drama on Channel A, Immortal Classic, playing the role of a foreigner who wants to learn about Kimchi, and in the following year, he made a guest appearance in OCN's God's Quiz Season 3 Episode 6.

In 2015, he featured in Korean group Ten Yard's music video for their song "Promise".

In 2016, he starred in KBS 2's Moorim School (무림학교) as Yeob Jung, along with Lee Hyun Woo and VIXX's Hongbin.

In 2017, he became the leading man in a Philippine TV series of GMA Network entitled My Korean Jagiya, alongside Filipina actress Heart Evangelista. The series aired for 105 episodes, ending in 2018. Lee signed a contract with GMA Artist Center on September 27, 2017 and appeared in more of GMA Network's programs, aside from My Korean Jagiya.

== Hosting/Variety Shows ==
=== Hosting ===
Lee hosted Arirang TV's radio show Pops in Seoul segment 'All About You' and 'Radio School' with bandmates Kevin Woo and Kim Eli during his time with U-Kiss. He also guest hosted on Arirang TV's The M-Wave and Showbiz Extra. From July to September 2012, he hosted a 2-min segment "XanderKpop" on weekdays for local Malaysian radio station FM988 in Cantonese. These segments introduced all-things Korean, from teaching trendy Korean phrases to the latest fashion trends in Korea. In 2013, he also hosted the 2K13 FEEL KOREA concert in Vancouver, Canada. In 2015, he joined DJ Isak in co-hosting a segment "The Ugly Truth" on Arirang Radio. The following year, he was also a guest on Arirang Radio's K-Poppin's Christmas Special. Currently, he is hosting a k-beauty show Stylecast on Arirang TV, alongside Ashley Choi from Ladies' Code, and also a daily radio program on tbs eFM, Double Date, with Superstar K7 winner Kevin Oh.

=== Variety ===
With U-KISS, Lee did a number of variety shows, including ETN U-KISS' Kiss the Dream in 2008, Mnet All About U-KISS, MBC Every1 U-Kiss Vampire, online web series You Know U-Kiss, SBS Star King, SBS Plus Hero Challenge, MBC We Are Dating, KBS Let's Go! Dream Team, and in Japan, Made in BS Japan. He was also on Channel [V] 就是爱JK - I Love JK in Taiwan.

In 2015, he was a regular guest for Guizhou TV's Perfect Dating (贵州卫视 非常完美).

== Modeling ==
In 2009, Lee walked the runway for the FEEL KOREA, K-POP Night & K-Fashion show in Shanghai, as well as at the Seoul Fashion Week 2011 S/S. In 2011, he donned renowned Korean designer Lie Sang Bong's designs at the GREEN is LOVE Lie Sang Bong Fashion Show in Seoul.

From 2013 to 2015, he was the brand ambassador and model for dENiZEN Singapore with then label-mate, Chloe Wang.

== Personal life ==
Lee and his family are Christians and he was involved briefly with 3rd Wave Music, a South Korean Christian music label and also considers Jaeson Ma as his mentor.

After finishing up most of his solo activities in 2014, he decided to return to his studies. He finished double major degrees, Journalism & Mass Communication and Business Administration, in Korea University. He participated actively in school and sometimes gives guest talks at lectures about his knowledge from being in the Korean entertainment industry. Lee was granted the Academic Excellence four times for having outstanding GPAs.

He currently resides in Seoul.

== Discography ==
=== Singles ===
==== As a lead artist ====
- "I Just" (2011)

==== As a featured artist ====
- "Your Love" (ft. Alexander) — Hye Ji (2011)

=== Soundtrack appearances ===
- Hero Challenge OST - "Hero" (2010)
- Real School OST Part 1 - "Kiss Me, Always" (2011)
- Immortal Classic OST - "The Kimchi Song"
- 3 Peas In A Pod OST - "You and I" (2013)
- My Korean Jagiya OST- "My Jagiya" featuring Heart Evangelista (2017)

=== Collaborative singles ===
- 2018: "S.M.N." [as AXM (with Marucci)]

== Filmography ==
=== Film ===
Year	Title	Role	Notes
2013	3 Peas in a Pod	Peter	Main Lead
2025	Home Sweet Home Rebirth	Novice Monk	Post-Production

=== Drama ===
Year	Title	Role	Notes	Country
2012	Immortal Masterpiece	Alexander	Supporting role	South Korea
2013	Quiz of God 3	Lee Han-seo	Cameo (Episode 6)	South Korea
2016	Moorim School: Saga of the Brave	Yeob Jung	Supporting role	South Korea
2017–18	My Korean Jagiya	Kim Jun-ho	Main cast	Philippines
2017	Dear Uge	Alexander	Special participation	Philippines
2018	Daig Kayo Ng Lola Ko	Gab	Special participation (The Adventures of Laura Patola and Duwen-ding Part 3-4)	Philippines

=== Variety ===
Year	Title	Notes
2009	Pops in Seoul	Host
2010	Chef's Kiss	Series
2010	The M-Wave	Host
2010	We Are Dating	Series (Terminated)
2017	Stylecast 2017	Host

=== Radio ===
Year	Title	Notes
2012	Xander Kpop	Host (Malaysian Radio)
2015	The Ugly Truth	Co-host with Isak
2017	Double Date	Co-host with Kevin Oh
2019	All Things Kpop	Co-host with Killagrams
