= Dear My Friend =

Dear My Friend may refer to:

- "Dear My Friend" (Every Little Thing song), 1997
- "Dear My Friend" (U-KISS song), 2012
- "Dear My Friend" (Agust D song), 2020
- "Dear My Friend", by Park Bo-gum, 2020
