= Gangsta Boy =

Gangsta Boy may refer to:

- "Gangsta Boy", a song by F(x) from Pinocchio, 2011
- "Gangsta Boy", a song by Jake One from White Van Music, 2008
- "Gangsta Boy", a song by U-KISS, 2012
- "Gangsta Boy", a song by Young Bleed from Rise Thru da Ranks from Earner Tugh Capo, 2005
