= Lee Ki-seop =

South Korean singer (born 1991)

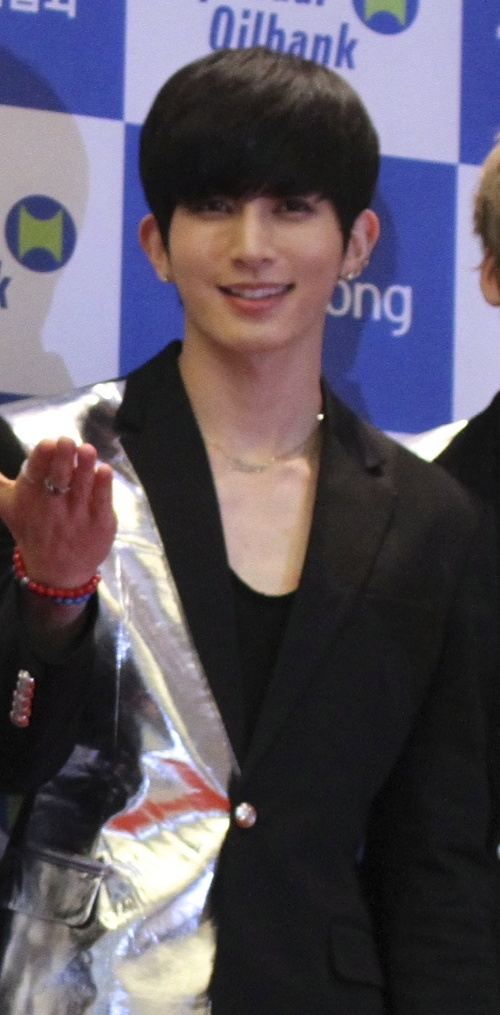
- Kiseop with U-Kiss at the press conference for Dream Concert 2013
- Born: January 17, 1991 (age 35); Seoul, South Korea
- Occupation: Singer
- Spouse: Jung Yu-na (m. 2019)
- Musical career
- Genres: K-pop
- Instruments: Vocals; piano
- Years active: 2009–present
- Labels: NH Media; Tango Music; Avex Trax
- Member of: U-KISS; UX1

Korean name
- Hangul: 이기섭
- RR: I Giseop
- MR: I Kisŏp

Lee Ki-seop (Korean: 이기섭; born January 17, 1991), commonly known as Kiseop, is a South Korean singer. He is best known for being a member of South Korean boy group U-KISS formed by NH Media in 2008. He joined U-KISS in November 2009, before departing the group in May 2019 and later rejoining the group in January 2022.

== Early life ==
Kiseop was born on January 17, 1991, in Seoul, South Korea where he lived with his parents and his older sister. He attended Yatab High School and was known for being a "Yatab Ulzzang", girls would follow him home and ask for his number.

Kiseop was also active in the dance circle during the High School years.

== Career ==
=== 2008: Pre-debut and joining U-KISS ===
Before debuting, Kiseop auditioned for numerous entertainment companies but he got rejected. He went into depression and thought about committing suicide but his parents helped guide him out of his suicidal stages.

Kiseop's first ever TV appearance was with Girls' Generation on PKL's Wonderful Outing. He was modeling for a friend before he auditioned and got into U-KISS. Before officially joining U-KISS, Kiseop appeared in their debut music video Not Young.

=== 2009–2010: Debut with U-KISS, CountiUkiss, ManManHani ===
In August 2009, U-KISS started recording new tracks for a follow-up to Bring It Back 2 Old School. The group released the EP ContiUKiss on November 5, 2009. The same day it was Kiseop's first TV appearance as the new U-KISS member.

The single was produced by Brave Brothers. A Japanese-language version was released on February 29, 2012, as part of their first Japanese album, A Shared Dream.

Kiseop has appeared on the second season of Ulzzang Shidae but was taken off the show because of U-KISS' tight schedule.

=== 2011–2013: Acting and Musicals ===
In 2011, Kiseop started his acting career in an MBC sitcom titled Real School along with his fellow member Eli Kim. The duo acted in a 40-episode series, transforming into high school students who reside at an "English Village" in an attempt to face and crack their fear of speaking English.

Kiseop along with bandmates Dongho, Hoon and Soohyun filmed a movie with Jay Park, Kim Soo Ro and Park Yejin with the working title Mr. Idol in February 2011.

In 2012, Kiseop, Soohyun, Eli and Kevin participated in the drama KPOP The Ultimate Audition, having small cameo appearances in three episodes acting as a senior idol group to the main cast.

In 2013, Kiseop participated in his first musical Summer Snow along with his fellow members Soohyun and Kevin. The same year he also was cast in Goong Musical with Hoon from July 11, 2013, to July 15, 2013.

In 2014, Kiseop was cast again in Goong Musical with his bandmates Soohyun, Hoon and Kevin.

=== 2019: Departure from U-KISS and Marriage ===
On May 16, 2019, NH Media announced that Kiseop's contract with NH Media had expired and he had decided not to renew it along with other fellow U-KISS member Eli.

On August 1, 2019, Kiseop announced through his Instagram that he would be marrying model/actress Jung Yoo Na.

=== 2022: New agency, return to U-KISS ===
On January 24, 2022, Kiseop signed an exclusive contract with Tango Music, with the announcement stating he is once again part of U-KISS.

== Filmography ==
=== TV series ===
Year	Title	Role	Language
2010	Real School	Student	Korean, English
2011	KPOP The Ultimate Audition	senior idol group (cameo)	Korean

=== Movies ===
Year #	Title	Role	Language
2011	Mr. Idol	Himself (as Wonder Boys) (cameo)	Korean

=== Musicals ===
- 2013: Summer Snow (Kevin, Soohyun & Kiseop)
- 2013: Goong (Kiseop & Hoon)
- 2014: Goong (Soohyun, Kiseop, Hoon & Kevin)
- 2016: Cafein
