= Tick Tack =

Tick Tack may refer to:

- Tick Tack (song), by South Korean boy band U-KISS
- Tick! Tack!, a visual novel by Navel
- Tic Tac, the brand name of small, hard mints manufactured by the Italian confectioner Ferrero
- Tic-tac (horse racing), a betting signalling system
