= DoraDora =

DORADORA
- Album cover

EP by U-KISS
- Released: April 25, 2012
- Recorded: 2011–2012
- Genre: Pop, electropop
- Label: NH Media, Neowiz Internet, Windmill Media; WMCD-0119

U-KISS chronology
Bran New Kiss (2011)	DORADORA (2012)	The Special to Kissme (2012)

Singles from DORADORA
- 1. "DORADORA" Released: April 25, 2012

DORADORA is the sixth extended play released by South Korean boy band U-KISS. It is the first EP to be released after their 8 months hiatus due to their activities in Japan. It was released on April 25, 2012.

== Background ==
Just after they wrapped up with their First Japan Nationwide Live Tour to promote their Japanese album, A Shared Dream, U-KISS reportedly recorded a total of 100 songs from international music producers for their comeback in South Korea. The group worked with famous producers Kim Hyung Seok and Brian Kim of Zigzag Note. U-KISS and NH Media reportedly had a hard time selecting the title track from the album, so they seek help from various famous composers who can assist them in the selection process. On April 16, 2012, the management announced that DORADORA will be the album's name, as well as the title for their carrier single. Singer-songwriter Jay Park contributed the "4U (For You)" at the request of long-time friend, main vocalist Soohyun, who is a former JYP Entertainment trainee. A representative of NH Media stated, "...this will be the band's first release since becoming an international K-pop sensation and the band is getting ready to wow the fans...". It is the first time that the group worked with Kim Hyun Suk whom contributed a lot for the album.

== Release ==
After 8 months of hiatus due to their busy promotional activities in Japan, U-KISS released this mini-album on April 25, 2012, physically and online. The song composed by AJ entitled AMAZING was released weeks prior to the album release. The teaser for DORADORA was also released on April 21, 2012, that made U-KISS to trend first spot worldwide on Twitter. Kpop News

== Track listing ==
No.	Title	Writer(s)	Length
1.	"돌아돌아 (DORADORA)"	Kim Hyung Suk, Brian Kim, Hur In Chang	3:39
2.	"4U (For You)"	Jay Park, Cha Cha Malone	3:26
3.	"사랑이 멈출 때" (When Love Stops)	Kim Hyun Suk	4:19
4.	"AMAZING"	AJ	3:33
5.	"TICK TOCK (OUT OF TIME)" (Korean version of Tick Tack)	JD Relic, AJ	3:42
6.	"돌아돌아 (DORADORA) (Inst.)" (Instrumental)		3:39
Total length:			22:03

== Chart performance ==
Chart	Peak position
Gaon Weekly Album Chart	-
Billboards World Albums	12

=== Singles charts ===
Song	Peak chart position	
Song	KOR	KOR
Song	Gaon Chart	K-Pop Billboard
"DORADORA "	73	-

==== Other songs charted ====
Song	Peak chart position	
Song	KOR	KOR
Song	Gaon Chart	K-Pop Billboard
"AMAZING"	106	—

In May 2012, DORADORA gained first spot on Germany's German Asian Music Chart for the month of May beating BIGBANG's Fantastic Baby.
