= Neverland (U-KISS album) =

Never land

Studio album by U-KISS
- Released: September 1, 2011
- Recorded: 2011
- Genre: K-pop
- Length: 47:18
- Label: NH Media; Neowiz Internet (Distributor); WMCD-0066
- Producer: Ryan Jhun

U-KISS chronology
Bran New Kiss (2011)	Never land (2011)	A Shared Dream (2012)

Singles from Neverland
- 1. "Someday" Released: August 26, 2011; 2. "Neverland" Released: September 1, 2011

Neverland is the second full-length studio album by South Korean boy band U-KISS, released on September 1, 2011. It is the first album to feature new members Hoon and AJ. The album's lead single, "Someday", was released digitally August 26, 2011. The album's second single, "Neverland", was released on September 1, 2011, on Mnet along with the rest of the album. The album was released in the Philippines in 2012 under Universal Records (Philippines).

== Background and development ==
The group worked in both Korea and Japan, and under an American producer, using top-notch facilities in Osaka, Japan. The album was released September 1, 2011.

The second single, "Neverland", was released on September 1 along with the other tracks from the album. "NEVERLAND", in contrast to the autotune trend, the vocals were recorded one by one. It was written by JD Relic, produced by conductor Ryan Jhun as well as Adam Kapit, and Korean lyrics were written by Misfit.

Songs with synthpop elements include "Baby Don't Cry", "Obsession", "Tell Me Y", "On the Floor" and "Top That", but the album is dominated mostly by ballads.

== Music video ==
The official music video for "Neverland" was released on August 31, 2011, and was directed by Kim Eun-yoo for 12 Rounds Production. The video starts with DJ Itae flipping a red disc, and ends with U-KISS forming a triangular position with Eli at the front, while "U-KISS NEVERLAND" appears on the top.

== Promotion ==
The video for the song "Neverland" reached a total of 730,000 views just within 72 hours of release and reached a total of 1,000,000 views within the next two days. Promotional television appearances were done in early September.

U-KISS promoted the album on tour in six Asian countries.

== Track listing ==
Official track listing
No.	Title	Lyrics	Music	Length
1.	"Intro"			0:56
2.	"Neverland"	Misfit	Adam Kapit, Ryan Jhun, JD Relic	3:35
3.	"Baby Don't Cry"	Kim Ji-hyang, GR8MOON (Rap)	Ryan Jhun, Jay Deasel, JD Relic	3:12
4.	"Someday"	Misfit	Denzil "iDR" Remedios, Ryan Jhun	4:00
5.	"Take Me Away" (Hoon & Kevin Woo)	David D.A. Doman and Kim Ji-hyang	David D.A Doman, &E	3:33
6.	"On The Floor"	Taewan aka C-Luv	Taewan aka C-Luv, Stay Tuned	3:31
7.	"친구의 사랑" (Love Of A Friend)	June, AJ (Rap)	Park Seong-su, JaBong from S2 Revolution	4:04
8.	"4월 이야기 feat. 은영 of 브레이브걸스" (Story Of April; Soohyun)	SWIN	SWIN	3:26
9.	"Obsession" (AJ & Lee Kiseop)	AJ	SWIN, AJ, Lee Kiseop	3:47
10.	"TOP THAT"	Kim Ji-hyang, AJ (rap)	Ryan Jhun, Antwann Frost, JD Relic	3:07
11.	"Tell Me Y" (Dongho & Eli Kim; feat. Swin)	AJ, Taewan aka C-Luv, Je Yu Young	Taewan aka C-Luv, Je Yu Young	3:14
12.	"다시 만나요" (We'll Meet Again; with Paran)	Won Sang-woo	Won Sang-woo	6:53
13.	"Someday" (instrumental)			4:00
Total length:				47:18

== Chart performance ==
The first single, "Someday" entered the Gaon Chart on August 21 after selling 1,629,879 digital downloads from August 21 to August 28. It climbed six spots in its second week on the chart from its debut at number 140. "Neverland" entered the chart at number 50 for garnering a total of 6,151,934 digital downloads and streams from August 28 to September 3, 2011. It peaked at number 37. On September 12, "Someday" entered the Billboard Korea K-Pop Hot 100 at number 100 while "Neverland" occupied the number 58 position, the latter also placing as the tenth "Biggest Jumper" in the chart on the said week.

== Album personnel ==
Credits for the album are as follows:

Recording

- U-KISS – artist, chorus
  - Kevin Woo – lead vocals, vocals
  - Shin Soohyun – main vocals, vocals
  - Shin Dongho – vocals, rap
  - Lee Kiseop – vocals, rap, composer
  - Yeo Hoon Min – back vocals, vocals, composer
  - Kim Jaeseop – vocals, rap, composer, lyric producer
  - Kim Eli – vocals, rap
- Paran – chorus

Producers and composers

- Ryan Jhun – composer, producer, arranger
- Adam Kapit – composer, producer, arranger
- Misfit – lyric producer
- JD Relic – arranger, chorus
- Antwann Frost – arranger
- Denzil "DR" Remedios – composer, producer, arranger, chorus
- Ryan Jhun – mastering
- Jay Deasel – producer, arranger
- C-LUV (Groove Network) – lyric producer, chorus
- Kim Ji-hyang (김지향) – lyric producer
- June – lyric producer
- Gr8Moon – lyric producer
- &E – lyric producer, composer
- Bag Seong Cheo (S2 Revolution) – music producer
- Swin – music producer, composer, chorus
- Stay Tuned – composer, arranger
- Min Syeong-so – chorus

Guitar

- Tommy Kim
- Ham Jeon-ho

== Release history ==
Region	Date	Format	Label
South Korea	September 1, 2011	CD, digital download	NH Media, Neowiz
Philippines	2012	CD, digital download	Universal Records Philippines
Japan	January 23, 2013	CD, digital download	Avex Trax
