= Yeo Hoon-min =

South Korean singer and actor (born 1991)

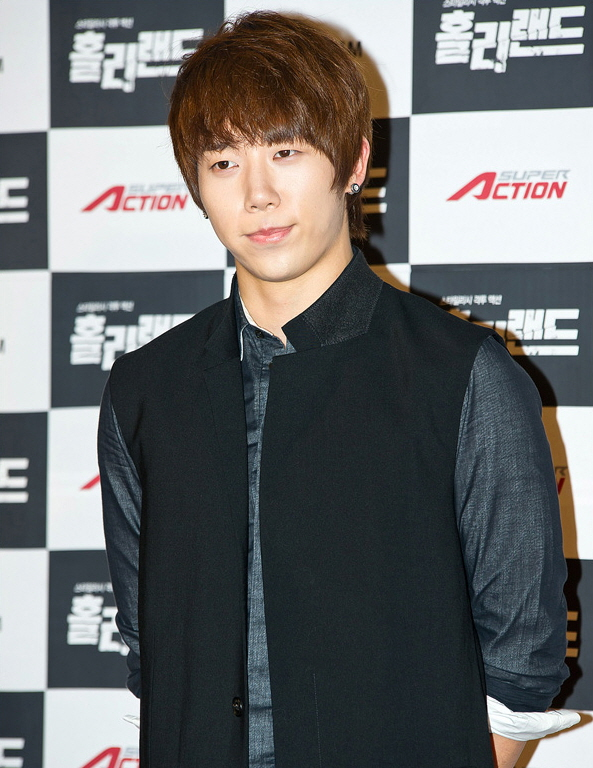
- Yeo in April 2012
- Born: August 16, 1991 (age 35); Namyangju, Gyeonggi-do, South Korea
- Occupations: Singer; actor
- Spouse: Hwang Ji-sun (m. 2022)
- Children: 1
- Musical career
- Genre: K-pop
- Instrument: Vocals
- Years active: 2009–present
- Labels: BOK Entertainment; NH Media; Tango Music; Avex Trax
- Member of: U-KISS; UX1

Korean name
- Hangul: 여훈민
- Hanja: 呂訓民
- RR: Yeo Hunmin
- MR: Yŏ Hunmin

Yeo Hoon-min (Korean: 여훈민; born August 16, 1991), also known by his stage name Hoon, is a South Korean singer and actor. He is best known as a member of South Korean boy band U-KISS under NH Media. He joined the group in February 2011 after the departure of Alexander Lee and Kim Kibum. Hoon graduated from Dongguk University, majoring in theatre and film.

== Early life ==
He was born in 1991. He was originally a Taekwondo player, who practiced the art for ten years since the age of 8. After being injured while practicing Taekwondo and being recommended by his friends to pursue a career in singing during his high school years he tried to venture into singing.

== Career ==
=== 2009–2010: Solo career ===
Hoon originally debuted as a solo ballad singer under his real name and released an extended play Pure & Love with the title track "Bus" on September 9, 2009. The following year, he released a digital single entitled "Beginning". Hoon also appeared in the SBS drama Athena: Goddess of War (2010) as the president's bodyguard.

=== 2011: U-KISS and acting career ===
After the departure of Alexander and Kibum, NH Media announced that Hoon and Paran's AJ would be joining U-KISS. He made his debut as a member of U-KISS through the group's fifth mini album Bran New Kiss which was released on March 30, 2011, with the title song "0330".

Hoon along with bandmates Dongho, Kiseop and Soohyun began filming a movie with Jay Park, Kim Soo Ro and Park Yejin with the working title Mr. Idol in February 2011. It was the group's first movie. Later that year, it was announced that Hoon and Dongho would star in Super Action TV's Holy Land, a four-part movie about rebellious high school students. The movie first aired on April 28, 2012.

In May 2013, Hoon was cast in the Korean musical The Memory 2013 as Eunsoo, a role he shared with singer Brian Joo.

He and Kiseop were also cast for the leading roles of the musical Goong, which was held in Osaka from July 11, 2013, to July 15, 2013.

=== U-KISS Unit with Soohyun ===
In 2013, during the U-KISS album promotions of Collage, Hoon performed with fellow member Soohyun on their unit song 'More Painful Than Pain'. In 2021, the unit group will release the song 'I Wish' in both Korean and Japanese.

=== 2016: Japanese solo debut ===
On January 16, 2017, it was announced that Hoon would make his Japanese solo debut with an album titled Yukisakura, making him the third member of U-KISS to do so.

=== 2021–present: New agency ===
In August 2021, Hoon left NH Media after his contract expired.

On January 24, 2022, Hoon signed an exclusive contract with Tango Music where he also returned with his groupmates Soohyun and Kiseop.

== Personal life ==
On May 6, 2022, Hoon announced that he would marry actress Hwang Ji-sun on May 29, 2022. On October 4, 2023, Hoon announced his wife's pregnancy via Instagram. His wife gave birth to their first child, a son, on January 2, 2024.

== Discography ==
=== Extended plays ===
Title	Album details
* Pure & Love (2009)	Released: September 9, 2009; Label: Loen Entertainment; Format: EP; Track listing: 1. 그렇게 시작되었다; 2. "버스"; 3. "아름다운말(Rap 은지)"; 4. "그녀의 블로그"; 5. "새들처럼" (Note: Cover of the 1988 song by Byun Jin-sub); 6. "사랑하면 안되니"; 7. "One Two Three(feat.예윤)"
Yukisakura(雪桜) (2017)	Released: 2017; Label: AVEX Japan; Format: CD; Track listing: 1. 雪桜; 2. 愛奏; 3. HEART STRINGS～言えないコトバ～ (strings version); 4. 雪桜(Instrumental); 5. 愛奏(Instrumental)
* Anniversary (2018)	Released:2018; Label: AVEX Japan; Format: CD; Track listing: 1. Anniversary; 2. Rain

=== Digital singles ===
- "Beginning" (2010)

== Filmography ==
=== Film ===
Year	Title	Role	Notes	Ref.
2011	Mr. Idol	Himself (as Wonder Boys)	Cameo	
2021	Only I Can See			

=== TV series ===
Year	Title	Role
2010	Athena: Goddess of War	President's bodyguard (Cameo)
2012	Holy Land	Kang Tae-shik
2013	Pretty Man	Kim Dae-shik
2015–2016	Sweet Home, Sweet Honey	Ahn Soo-ho
2017	Unknown Woman	Jjang-goo
