= Soohyun & Hoon =

South Korean musical duo

Soohyu & Hoon
- Origin: Seoul, South Korea
- Genres: K-pop; J-pop
- Years active: 2013–present
- Label: Tango Music
- Spinoff of: U-KISS
- Members: Soohyun; Hoon
- Website: ukiss15.com

Soohyun & Hoon (Korean: 수현&훈) are a two-member vocal unit of South Korean pop group U-KISS.

== Background ==
Soohyun debuted as one of the original members of U-KISS in 2008, while Hoon joined the group in 2011.

=== 2013: First promotions ===
Soohyun & Hoon first performed together with the song "아픔보다 아픈" (More Painful than Pain), which was released on the U-KISS album Collage. The duo then promoted the song on various South Korean music shows.

=== 2019–2020: Return from mandatory military service ===
Soohyun completed his military service in 2019, while Hoon completed his service in 2020.

On return from military duties, Soohyun & Hoon released a cover of their U-KISS group song 'Come Back To Me' 2020 Version.

=== 2021: I Wish ===
Soohyun & Hoon announced that they were planning a comeback album on January 27, 2021. The single 'I Wish', will be released in both Korean and Japanese.
