= Stop Girl =

U-Kiss Mini Album Vol. 7 - Stop Girl

EP by U-KISS
- Released: September 20, 2012
- Recorded: 2012
- Genre: K-pop, dance, soul
- Length: 21:21
- Language: Korean
- Label: NH Media, Neowiz Internet, Windmill Media; WMCD-0155

U-KISS chronology
The Special To Kiss Me (2012)	U-Kiss Mini Album Vol. 7 - Stop Girl (2012)	Collage (2013)

Singles from Stop Girl
- 1. "Stop Girl" Released: September 19, 2012

Stop Girl is the 7th Mini Album by South Korean boy band U-KISS. The title track is "Stop Girl" and it is the first album without new member AJ who went on hiatus to Columbia University. The music video for "Stop Girl" was released September 19, 2012.

== Release ==
On September 12, 2012 UKISS revealed the teaser for their new single "Stop Girl". It was followed up by the release of the music video on September 19. On September 23, they released the dance practice video for their lead single.

"Stop Girl" will be the groups first comeback since the release of their Japanese single "One of You" on September 7 and their first Korean comeback since the release of "Believe" in June. The title track is written by Ryan Jeon, who also wrote their hit song "Neverland". The physical album was released on September 20, along with the digital album as well.

== Track listing ==
The EP's tracks are as follows:

No.	Title	Length
1.	"IMMA NEW THANG" (Intro)	0:29
2.	"Stop Girl" (Title)	3:27
3.	"Time To Go"	3:01
4.	"Remember" (Acoustic Version)	4:18
5.	"Sexy Baby"	3:07
6.	"Stop Girl" (English Version)	3:37
7.	"Stop Girl" (Instrumental)	3:22
Total length:		21:21

== Charts ==
Singles Chart	Peak position
Mnet	15
Billboard Korea	86
Gaon	93

Domestic Sales	Peak position
Gaon	89
