= Soda Pop (song) =

2025 song by Saja Boys

Promotional single by Saja Boys

from the album KPop Demon Hunters
- Language: English; Korean
- Released: August 27, 2025
- Genre: K-pop
- Length: 2:30
- Label: Republic; Visva
- Songwriters: Vince; Kush; Danny Chung; 24; Dominsuk
- Producers: 24; Dominusk; Ian Eisendrath

Lyric video
- "Soda Pop" on YouTube

"Soda Pop" is a song performed by Andrew Choi, Neckwav, Danny Chung, Kevin Woo, and SamUIL Lee as the fictional boy band the Saja Boys in the 2025 animated musical fantasy film KPop Demon Hunters. It was released on August 27, 2025, through Republic Records, as a promotional single for the film's soundtrack album. It was created by the writers Vince, Kush, and Chung and producers 24, Dominsuk, and Ian Eisendrath.

The song received acclaim for its "bright and bubbly" rhythm. As one of the songs from the film's soundtrack to experience commercial success, it entered the top ten in at least 18 countries. On the Billboard Global 200, it peaked at number three.

== Background and composition ==
"Soda Pop" was written by Vince, Kush, and Danny Chung – with production by 24, Dominsuk, and Ian Eisendrath – for the animated musical fantasy film KPop Demon Hunters. In the film, "Soda Pop" acts as an introductory song to the Saja Boys, an antagonistic demon boy band, whose singing voices are performed by Andrew Choi, Neckwav, Chung, Kevin Woo, and SamUIL Lee. The song was initially recorded by Vince as a guitar demo titled "Ice Cream" roughly seven years prior to the production of KPop Demon Hunters; this demo was later reworked into "Soda Pop" after being given by Vince to producer 24.

In an interview during December 2025, Chung summarized the process of composing the song stating:

Holistically, the DNA of a song like “Soda Pop” is different from THEBLACKLABEL DNA, so we had to almost think method, think outside of our own body. At first, the direction was coming back to our early demos of the song, and it was almost that it was 'too cool,' because that’s what we were used to doing—a little bit more fashion-forward music. But “Soda Pop” by design was supposed to be a little retro and ... I want to use this word carefully, but cheesy by design—an earworm and 'annoyingly addictive.' That was the direction we were given.

Chung concluded that the song had a distinct 90s style boy band vibe intentionally used in the composition of the song.

Chung, while discussing the song's composition, described it as a "[c]ute, bubbly, intentionally annoyingly infectious" earworm that is "meant to lure you in". He additionally noted how the song's lyrics, though superficially sounding romantic, hold more toxic meanings to them, which serves to reflect the Saja Boys' goals in the film of deceiving and consuming the souls of their listeners. Eisendrath said that the goal of the song was to "create one of those super bubblegum-y K-pop boy band songs in the style of a song like 'Butter'" by BTS. Commenting further on the lyrics, Eisendrath explained the drinking in every drop of the 'you're my soda pop' metaphor, saying that "[the Saja Boys] feed on souls. So it was like, 'How do we say that in a way that appears [like an] innocent, fun, K-pop bop, but actually it's expressing who these people really are and what they're really after?'"

== Critical reception ==
Stay Free Radio stated that the introduction was like a "neon sugar rush". The website added that the delivery was "intense", with it being "polished to perfection" with the songwriters being involved in other musical acts. Tune Insights stated that the song was "playful", like a "summer day with friends". According to the website, the chorus makes you "hungry for more, never satisfied, [and] always reaching for another taste. During a discussion on film for NPR's Pop Culture Happy Hour, both Stephen Thompson and Regina G. Barber commented that "song of the summer" is the first association you make when you hear "Soda Pop". Thompson explained that "you completely understand how this song would kind of capture people's imaginations" and how suddenly "everybody would welcome this as this hot, new idol band". Jae-Ha Kim opined that it is "a beautiful pop song" which is both "jubilant" and "catchy" but also the lyrics are "just a little bit dirty, which is also very K-pop".

J-Hope of BTS joined the trend, posting a video with his backup dancers in the backstage of Lollapalooza.

=== Accolades ===
Year	Award	Category	Result	Refs.
2025	K-World Dream Awards	Best OST	Nominated	
2025	Korea Grand Music Awards	Best Virtual Artist	Nominated	
2025	MAMA Awards	Best OST	Nominated	
2025	MAMA Awards	Song of the Year	Nominated	
2026	Choreo Awards	K-Pop Choreography Discovery Award	Won	
2026	Music Awards Japan	International Song powered by Spotify	Nominated	

=== Listicles ===
Name of publisher, year listed, name of listicle, and placement
Publisher	Year	Listicle	Placement	Ref.
TikTok Korea	2025	Song of the Summer	1st	
TikTok Korea	2025	Year in Music	5th	
YouTube	2025	Top Songs	4th	
YouTube	2025	Top Songs on YouTube Shorts	8th	
YouTube Korea	2025	Shorts' Top Popular Songs	1st	
YouTube Korea	2025	Most Popular Song	3rd	

== Commercial performance ==
"Soda Pop" debuted at number 28 in the Billboard Philippines Hot 100 chart, later peaking at number six during the week of July 19, 2025. The song debuted at number 119 on the Billboard Global 200 in the week of July 5. The song entered the chart's top ten at number six during the week of July 19, before peaking at number three in the week of August 9, 2025. By the last weeks of June, "Soda Pop" climbed the charts of Spotify. The song peaked at number 3 on the Billboard Hot 100 during the week of October 4, 2025.

"Soda Pop" reached number 3 on the UK Singles Chart in the week of August 22, 2025. The song peaked at number 3 on the ARIA Singles Chart dated October 6. The same week, it also debuted at number 32 on the Australian playlist chart with a combined total of 204 spins across the national network.

The song peaked at number eight on August 23 at the Canadian Hot 100. The song peaked at number 161 for the French Singles Chart. The song entered the German Singles Chart at number 57, before rising to number 28 during the week of August 1.

== Live performances ==
"Soda Pop" has been performed live by Woo on multiple occasions. He performed the song atop a tour bus in a promotional event for the film in August 2025, at the KIIS-FM Jingle Ball in December 2025, as part of both the pre-show and the main stage, and again in December for Time's A Year in TIME event.

== Track listing ==
7-inch vinyl, digital download and streaming

1. "Soda Pop" – 2:30
2. "Soda Pop" (instrumental) – 2:29

== Charts ==
=== Weekly charts ===
Weekly chart performance
Chart (2025–2026)	Peak position
Argentina Anglo Airplay (Monitor Latino)	9
Australia (ARIA)	4
Austria (Ö3 Austria Top 40)	6
Canada (Canadian Hot 100)	5
Central America Anglo Airplay (Monitor Latino)	7
Chile Anglo Airplay (Monitor Latino)	8
Colombia Anglo Airplay (Monitor Latino)	9
Costa Rica Anglo Airplay (Monitor Latino)	11
Czech Republic Singles Digital (ČNS IFPI)	33
Denmark (Tracklisten)	19
Dominican Republic Anglo Airplay (Monitor Latino)	6
Ecuador Anglo Airplay (Monitor Latino)	3
El Salvador Anglo Airplay (Monitor Latino)	7
France (SNEP)	36
Germany (GfK)	4
Global 200 (Billboard)	3
Greece International Streaming (IFPI)	53
Guatemala Anglo Airplay (Monitor Latino)	8
Honduras Anglo Airplay (Monitor Latino)	5
Hong Kong (Billboard)	12
Iceland (Tónlistinn)	5
Ireland (IRMA)	11
Israel (Mako Hitlist)	34
Italy (FIMI)	71
Japan (Japan Hot 100)	93
Japan Hot Animation (Billboard Japan)	14
Latin America Anglo Airplay (Monitor Latino)	10
Lithuania (AGATA)	70
Malaysia (IFPI)	3
Malaysia International Streaming (RIM)	2
Mexico Anglo Airplay (Monitor Latino)	4
Netherlands (Single Top 100)	31
New Zealand (Recorded Music NZ)	3
Nigeria (TurnTable Top 100)	82
Norway (IFPI Norge)	7
Panama Anglo Airplay (Monitor Latino)	3
Paraguay Anglo Airplay (Monitor Latino)	13
Peru Airplay (Monitor Latino)	13
Philippines (Philippines Hot 100)	6
Poland (Polish Streaming Top 100)	52
Portugal (AFP)	49
Singapore (RIAS)	3
Slovakia Singles Digital (ČNS IFPI)	35
South Korea (Circle)	2
Spain (Promusicae)	53
Sweden (Sverigetopplistan)	3
Switzerland (Schweizer Hitparade)	15
Taiwan (Billboard)	4
United Arab Emirates (IFPI)	5
UK Singles (Official Charts)	3
US Billboard Hot 100	3
Venezuela Anglo Airplay (Monitor Latino)	3
Vietnam (Vietnam Hot 100)	16

=== Monthly charts ===
Monthly chart performance
Chart (2025)	Peak position
South Korea (Circle)	2

=== Year-end charts ===
Year-end chart performance
Chart (2025)	Position
Australia (ARIA)	28
Austria (Ö3 Austria Top 40)	53
Canada (Canadian Hot 100)	46
Germany (GfK)	59
Global 200 (Billboard)	63
Iceland (Tónlistinn)	71
New Zealand (Recorded Music NZ)	16
Philippines (Philippines Hot 100)	52
South Korea (Circle)	16
Sweden (Sverigetopplistan)	71
Switzerland (Schweizer Hitparade)	81
UK Singles (OCC)	36
US Billboard Hot 100	61

== Certifications ==
Certifications
Region	Certification	Certified units/sales
Australia (ARIA)	2× Platinum	140,000^{‡}
Belgium (BRMA)	Gold	20,000^{‡}
Brazil (Pro-Música Brasil)	3× Platinum	120,000^{‡}
Canada (Music Canada)	3× Platinum	240,000^{‡}
Denmark (IFPI Danmark)	Gold	45,000^{‡}
France (SNEP)	Platinum	200,000^{‡}
Mexico (AMPROFON)	Platinum+Gold	210,000^{‡}
New Zealand (RMNZ)	2× Platinum	60,000^{‡}
Poland (ZPAV)	Platinum	125,000^{‡}
Portugal (AFP)	Gold	12,000^{‡}
Spain (Promusicae)	Gold	50,000^{‡}
United Kingdom (BPI)	Platinum	600,000^{‡}
United States (RIAA)	Platinum	1,000,000^{‡}
^{‡} Sales+streaming figures based on certification alone.

== Release history ==
Release dates and formats
Region	Date	Format	Version	Label	Ref.
Various	August 27, 2025	Digital download; streaming	Original; instrumental	Republic	
Various	November 21, 2025	7-inch vinyl	Original; instrumental	Republic	
