= Eli Kim =

Korean-American musician (born 1991)

Eli
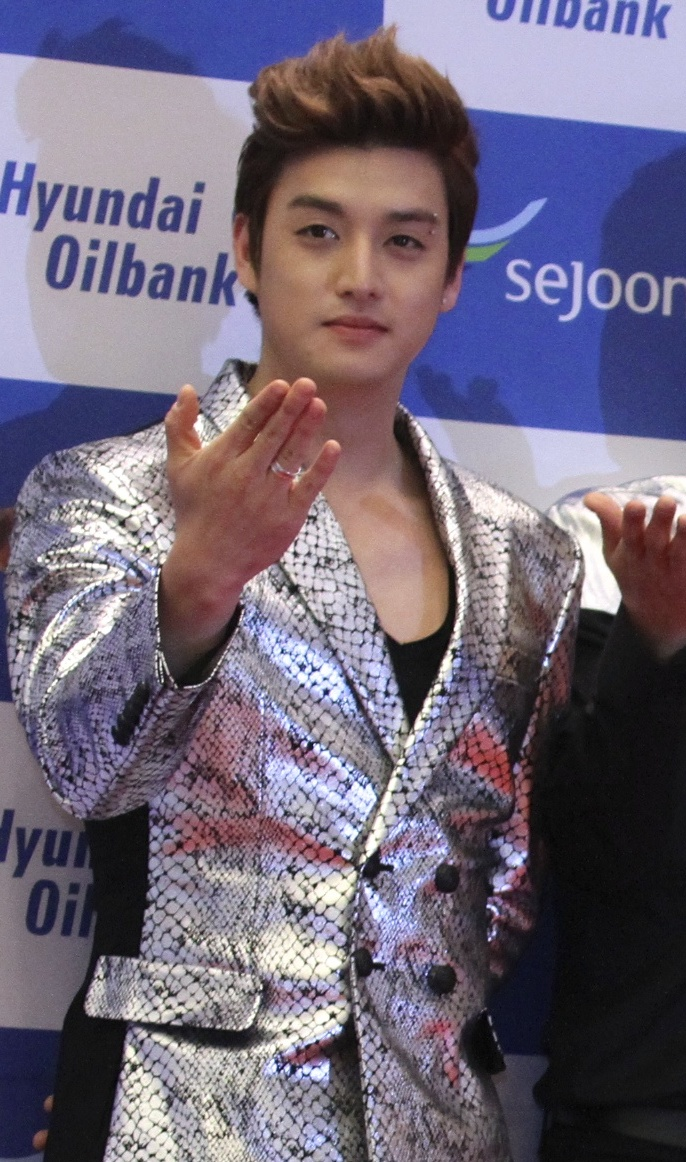
- Eli with U-Kiss at the press conference for Dream Concert 2013
- Born: Ellison Kyoung-jae Kim; March 13, 1991 (age 35); Los Angeles, California, U.S
- Other names: Kim Koung-jae; Eli Kim
- Occupations: Singer; rapper
- Spouse: Ji Yeon-soo (m. 2014; sep. 2020)
- Children: Michael Min-soo Kim
- Musical career
- Genre: K-pop
- Instrument: Vocals
- Years active: 2008–2019; 2023-present
- Labels: NH Media, Tango Music

- Korean name
- Hangul: 김경재
- Hanja: 金炅才
- RR: Gim Gyeongjae
- MR: Kim Kyŏngjae

Ellison Kyoung-jae Kim (born March 13, 1991), better known by his stage name Eli, is a South Korean-American singer and rapper. He is a member of South Korean boy band U-KISS.

== Early life ==
Eli was born in Los Angeles, California to Korean parents. He spent most of his years in Fredericksburg, Virginia. He has a younger sister Minah and an older sister Hannah. He attended Ni River Middle School and Riverbend High School in Virginia. After dropping out of high school, he went alone to Beijing, China at 15 to pursue his studies, and also learned Mandarin. He trained in Taekwondo and Kung Fu for 12 years, opening an opportunity for him to be cast as an extra in a Chinese movie. He is fluent in English, Korean and Mandarin.

== Music career ==
=== U-Kiss ===
Eli is the fourth addition to the Korean boy band U-KISS, which was formed by NH Media Entertainment in 2008. They were launched in Power of Atamix in Japan alongside other Korean boy bands such as Paran. They also debuted in South Korea days later.

On April 27, 2011, Eli and Kevin went to Hong Kong for a special street date with their Hong Kong fans for their show Star Date with U-KISS in Hong Kong special. This was sponsored by Binggrae, which aims to connect the fans all over the world to Hallyu stars to encourage cultural exchanges. The special was aired through Arirang TV on May 3.

On May 16, 2019, NH Media announced that Eli’s contract with NH Media had expired and he had decided not to renew it along with other fellow U-KISS member Kiseop.

=== Other activities ===
Eli was one of the hosts for the variety show Raising Idol along with U-KISS member Shin Dongho, MBLAQ's Thunder and Shinee's Key. He appeared on MBC's We Are Dating on December 24, 2010 where he showed his Casanova type of being a man. He also hosted the segment "All About You" on Arirang TV's Pops in Seoul, along with fellow U-KISS members, Alexander and Kevin. He also acts as an MC in the show Fusion with Park Myung-soo under MBC which premiered on April 1.

In November 2012, Eli along with NS Yoon-G were chosen to host a new weekly English show, K-pop Tasty Road on Olive TV (and on Mnet in the United States and various other countries). The show gives K-pop fans a sense of where Hallyu celebrities eat, play, work, and shop. The first episode was aired on November 10.

== Acting career ==
In January 2010, Eli and fellow member Kibum started their acting career in a Thai-Korean drama, Autumn Destiny, with Thai actor Mario Maurer. Eli and Kibum's voices were dubbed since they could not speak Thai.

In 2011, Eli and fellow members Dongho and Kiseop were cast in an MBC sitcom titled Real School. The trio acted in a 40-episode series, transforming into high school students who reside at an "English Village" in an attempt to face and crack their fear of speaking English.

In October 2014, Eli was cast as the male lead in a Chinese adaptation of the Korean drama Full House.

== Personal life ==
On April 18, 2011, Eli was injured during a rehearsal. He fractured his right hand and underwent surgery. The hospital stated that it wouldn't be difficult for Eli to perform, and he managed to perform with a cast on his right arm.

On December 4, 2015, Eli announced via instagram that he had been married for over a year, since June 5, 2014, having dated his wife, who is a model 11 years his senior, for five years. It was also announced that they were expecting a child. His fellow members Soohyun and Kevin took to Twitter to comfort the fans about the surprising news of Eli's marriage news. On December 6, 2015, U-KISS' label NH Media released a statement to clear up some questions. His label said that Eli's marriage would not affect his promotions with U-KISS and that he would continue filming his Chinese drama and asked fans to refrain from leaving hate comments, as he would soon be a father. On June 8, 2016, Eli's son, Michael Min-soo Kim, was born.

On August 30, 2016, Eli revealed his wife, Ji Yeon-soo to the public on MBC Every1's Video Star. On January 4, 2017, Eli revealed his life as a husband and father by joining reality show, KBS's Mr. House Husband with his wife, Ji Yeon-soo and their son, Michael Min-soo Kim.

Eli announced his separation from Ji in November 2020, with Michael remaining with his mother while he is staying in the United States.

== Filmography ==
=== Television drama ===
Year	Title	Role	Notes
2010	Autumn's Destiny		Thai-Korean drama
2011	Real School!	Superior elite	Sitcom (episode 12)
TBA	Full House		Chinese drama

=== TV shows ===
Year	Title
2009	All About U-KISS; You Know U-KISS
2010	Midnight Idols With U-KISS; U-KISS Vampire; Chef's Kiss; Raising Idol (Dongho's English TA)
2011	Made in BS Japan
2012	K-pop Tasty Road
2017	Mr. House Husband
2019	King of Mask Singer
2022	We Got Divorced 2
