= Allen Kim =

South Korean idol (born 1990)

Kim Ki-bum 김기범
- Also known as: Marumir, Allen Kibum
- Born: December 29, 1990 (age 35)
- Origin: Seoul, South Korea
- Genres: Pop; dance
- Occupations: Singer; dancer; artist
- Years active: 2006–present
- Labels: XING Entertainment; NH Media; IQg Music; Universal Music Japan/Universal D; Professional Entertainment; SH Entertainment

Kim Ki-bum (Korean: 김기범 ; born December 29, 1990), now better known by his stage name in Japan Allen Kim, is a South Korean idol singer, best known for being a former member of South Korean boy band U-KISS. He is also the younger brother of SS501 member Kim Hyung-jun.

== Career ==
=== 2006–2007: Career beginnings ===
Kibum made his music debut in 2006 with the K-pop group XING, alongside Cheon Hye Sung, Yume and Kevin Woo. However, he left to better his future a year after debuting with XING.

=== 2008: Debut with U-KISS ===
In 2008, Kibum together with 5 other members of U-KISS made their official debut with their first mini-album N-Generation. The title track from the album was Not Young an upbeat track that displayed the youth of all the members, and that they themselves are no longer boys.

U-KISS released their second mini-album Bring It Back 2 Old School in February 2009. U-KISS made their TV debut on their first ever variety show All About U-KISS. Later in November 2009 came ContiUKiss, a mini-album that displayed the boys metamorphosis from boys to men. Lee Ki-seop became the 7th member of U-KISS during this mini-album.

The group released their first full-length album Only One in early 2010, with the title track "Bingeul Bingeul". They starred in another second variety show called U-KISS Vampire, which was based on how different blood types interact and react in situations. After receiving much attention from their new album, U-KISS starred in a third variety show called Chef's Kiss, in which the members were divided into several groups and had to complete several missions, such as coming up with new recipes and be part of restaurant crew.

After returning from the Philippines concert series and fanmeets in Malaysia and Singapore, the group October released their fourth mini-album Break Time in October 2010. The song promoted from this album was "Shut Up!!" and the album was received well from the public. They also appeared as regular guests every Wednesday on a Japanese variety show called Made in BS Japan on TV Tokyo, before debuting with their Japanese debut album First Kiss. First Kiss charted at number 2 on the Daily Oricon Chart on its release date.

=== 2011: Departure from U-KISS ===
On February 23, 2011, it was revealed that Kibum and Alexander's contracts with NH Media had been terminated. Although at first Kibum's character business with his brother had been cited as the reason for his departure, it was later revealed that NH Media believed he was "lacking"; therefore, NH Media desired member replacements.

=== 2011–2012: HnB Company & Solo Activities ===
On December 29, 2010, Kibum setup HnB Company together with his older brother Kim Hyung Jun, a character business based on his original creation, PiroPiro and SiroSiro. following his departure from U-Kiss, he put much effort to promote the business, while at the same time embarking on his solo activity.

On May 21, 2011, Kibum, with the help of Warner Music Singapore held his first solo international activity in Singapore, "Till We Meet Again" Kibum's Farewell Meet&Greet and Fanmeet at IMM Garden Plaza and Dragonfly (St James Power Station) respectively. The trip to Singapore was also slated as a cultural exchange as part of the effort to promote the said character business.

In addition, Kibum also made several public appearances alongside his older brother, Kim Hyung Jun in Korea. On June 17, 2011, it was announced that Kibum, together with 5 other entertainers (Moon Chun Shik, Lady Jane, Kim Ho Young, Kwak Hyun Hwa, Gu Bon Hyung) would join a new reality show by GTV '드림메이커' (Dream Maker) as mentors (or known as 'Dream Planners').

Along with the announced appearance in Dream Maker, Kibum revealed through his official Japanese blog that he had been travelling to and from Japan, hinting at possible activities in Japan. In late August 2011, it was announced that he would be taking part in K-POP MUSIC FESTIVAL (Kagoshima), on September 10 as the MC.

Following his first Japanese stint at Kagoshima, Kibum embarked on his solo activities in Japan as アレン・キボム (Allen Kibum). Shortly after the Kagoshima event, it was revealed that he would be having his acting debut in a Japanese musical 「絆2011 少年よ大紙を抱け！」("Bond 2011, Boys Be Ambitious"), as Allen, a full-time Korean exchange student. The musical was held from October 20–25, 2011, with a total of 8 performances.

He had another short stint in acting as a cameo in Japanese drama 「孤独のグルメ」 (The Lonely Gourmet), which was aired on TV Tokyo on February 22, 2012, at 00:43–01:13 JST. Kibum appeared as guest MC for MADE IN BS JAPAN for several time before it was decided that he would be a regular MC for the show every Friday, starting from January 6, 2012. His regular MC appearance ceased together with the wrapping of the said variety show on March 30, 2012.

Aside from his appearance in television program, Kibum also held his first solo fanmeet live premium in Billboard Live TOKYO, Japan on December 29, 2011, as a commemoration of the start of his solo activity, as well as to celebrate his 21st birthday. Up to date, he has released an official 2012 calendar and some other official merchandises, as well as opened his official Japan Fan Club. He has made live appearance as guest performer in several other events in various places in Japan such as Akita and Osaka. His latest stint as a live performer was Shin-Okubo K-POP STORY, which was held every Tuesday at esprive, Shin-Okubo.

=== 2012: Japanese debut ===
Kim Kibum is set to release his debut solo CD entitled Dream (Japanese: ドリーム) on December 26, 2012, in Japan. The single album was initially set to consist of four tracks, all of which were composed by the artist himself. However, on November 15 Kibum revealed through his official Japanese blog that another song titled 'MELODY', composed by Tamaki Koji, had been added to the track list. Later on, it was revealed via Kibum's Twitter that his friend, LeeU (Lee Seung Hyun), had contributed in the making of the single album.

=== 2013: Korea solo debut ===
On March 15, 2013, it was announced through an official press release by Professional Entertainment that Kibum will return to Korea entertainment industry with the release of his solo album Longing in April. He will use the stage name Allen Kibum (알렌기범).

== Discography ==
Year	Album title	Details	Track listing
2012	Dream	Released: 26 December 2012 (Japan); Format: CD-MAXI, digital download, streaming; Label: IQG, Universal D	Track listing: 1. "Dream"; 2. "Make It"; 3. "Dream" [Inst.]; 4. "Make It" [Inst.]; 5. "MELODY"

Year	Album title	Details
2013	Longing	Released: April 2013 (South Korea); Format: CD, digital download, streaming; Label: Professional Entertainment

=== Song writing ===
- "Hey G" (from SS501: Solo Collection) – composed by Kim Hyung-jun and Kim Ki-bum (H&B)
- "Want It", "The One", "I Am" (from SS501: U R Man) – lyrics by Kim Hyung-jun and Kim Ki-bum (H&B)

== Filmography ==
- I Am Legend
- The Lonely Gourmet
- Made in BS Japan
