= Only One (U-KISS album) =

Studio album by U-KISS
- Released: February 3, 2010 (South Korea); March 31, 2010 (Philippines)
- Recorded: 2009
- Genre: Pop, electropop
- Length: 44:38
- Label: NH Media, KT Music; KTMCD-3000
- Producer: Brave Brothers; Han Sang-won

U-KISS chronology
| ContiUKiss (2009) | Only One (2010) | Break Time (2010) |

Singles from Only One
- 1. "Bingeul Bingeul" Released: February 5, 2010; 2. "What" Released: April 15, 2010

Only One is the debut Korean studio album by South Korean boy band U-KISS, it was released on February 3, 2010. It features the lead single "Round and Round (Bingeul Bingeul)".

== Background ==
Before prepareations for U-KISS' first full-length album, Only One was finalized, "Without You" was the planned lead single. However, on February 3, 2010, "Bingeul Bingeul" (original title: 빙글빙글; literal meaning Round and Round) was announced as the lead single. The song was released via digital download on February 2 of the same year.

After various performances in South Korea, Universal Records released the album in the Philippines on March 28. 2010. Premiere Entertainment Philippines (PEP Inc.) brought U-KISS to Manila for the first time to promote their album, and the group had three-day mall shows in the Philippines and appearances on GMA Network's Party Pilipinas and Walang Tulugan with the Master Showman. U-KISS set the record with the most number of albums sold in a mall event selling up to 5,000 copies of the album and earning an estimate of 1 million pesos. Following this, U-KISS held their first major concert, entitled "First Kiss Tour in Manila', on June 14, 2010 at the Araneta Coliseum. The event was later released on DVD entitled U-KISS 1st Kiss Tour in Manila DVD.

The album Only One reached number 2 on Gaon's Weekly Digital Charts and placed at number 71 on the 2010 Year-End Charts. On February 29, 2012 a Japanese version of "Bingeul Bingeul" was released as a part of U-KISS's first Japanese album, A Shared Dream.

== Track listing ==
| No. | Title | Length |
|---|---|---|
| 1. | "Intro" | 0:20 |
| 2. | "Bingeul Bingeul" (빙글빙글; Round & Round) | 3:16 |
| 3. | "Without You" | 3:19 |
| 4. | "Mworago" (뭐라고; What) | 3:29 |
| 5. | "Bang Bang Bang" | 3:30 |
| 6. | "Dancing Floor" | 3:16 |
| 7. | "Man Man Ha Ni" (Remix} (만만하니; Am I That Easy?) | 3:41 |
| 8. | "OK!" (Remix) | 3:26 |
| 9. | "I Like You" (Remix) (니가 좋아) | 3:40 |
| 10. | "Talk to Me" (Remix) | 3:30 |
| 11. | "Not Young" (Remix) (어리지 않아) | 3:02 |
| 12. | "Give It To Me" (Remix) | 3:31 |
| 13. | "Bingeul Bingeul" (Instrumental) | 3:18 |
| 14. | "Mworago" (Instrumental) | 3:29 |
| Total length: | | 44:38 |

== Charts ==
| Chart | Peak position |
|---|---|
| Gaon Weekly Album Chart | 2 |
| Gaon Yearly Chart Album Chart | 71 |

== Sales ==
| Chart | Sales |
|---|---|
| Gaon physical sales | 20,911+ |
