= Collage (U-KISS album) =

Studio album by U-KISS
- Released: March 7, 2013
- Recorded: 2013
- Genre: K-pop, dance,
- Length: 40:08
- Language: Korean
- Label: NH Media

U-KISS chronology
Stop Girl (2012)	Collage (2013)

Singles from Collage
- 1. "Standing Still" Released: March 7, 2013

Collage is the third Korean studio album by k-pop boy band UKISS. The title track is "Standing Still"

== Release ==
On February 28, 2013, photo teasers were released of all of the members. The photo teasers had a "dreamlike look with translucent and hazy colors." The album was released at 12PM (KST) on March 7, 2013. Due to unknown difficulties the music video was released a day later after the full album on March 8, 2013.

== Solos and duets on the album ==
On March 3, 2013, it was announced that there would be 3 solos and duets on the album. Kevin performed a solo called "My Reason", Eli and AJ made a duet called "Party All the Time", and Soohyun and Hoon also performed a duet which they promoted called "More Painful Than Pain".

== Track listing ==
The album's tracks are as follows:

No.	Title	Lyrics	Music	Length
1.	"Step by Step" (Intro)			0:48
2.	"Standing Still" (Title)	Cameron Forbes, Ryan Jhun, AJ (rap)	David Doman, Ryan Hyun	3:16
3.	"숨도 못 쉬어" (Can't Breathe)			3:31
4.	"Missing You"			3:35
5.	"나쁘다" (Bad Person)			3:54
6.	"아픔보다 아픈" (More Painful than Pain)			4:00
7.	"My Reason"			3:33
8.	"Party All the Time"	AJ & Eli		3:21
9.	"Sweety Girl"			3:02
10.	"사랑하니까" (Because I Love You)			3:56
11.	"아픔보다 아픈" (Instrumental)	-		4:00
12.	"Standing Still" (Instrumental)	-	David Doman, Ryan Hyun	3:16
Total length:				40:08

== Chartings ==
Singles Chart	Peak position
Mnet	14
Billboard Korea	12
Hanteo	1

Domestic Sales	Peak position
Gaon	2

=== Sales ===
Chart	Sales
Gaon physical sales	18,313+
Hanteo physical sales	10,000+
Oricon physical sales	2,918+
