= Dear My Friend (U-KISS song) =

Single by U-KISS
- B-side: "Beautiful"
- Released: July 25, 2012
- Recorded: Japan
- Genre: J-pop
- Length: 4:28
- Label: Avex Trax (Japan)
- Songwriters: Odate Kei, H-Wonder

U-KISS Japanese singles chronology
"Forbidden Love" (2012)	"Dear My Friend" (2012)	"One Of You" (2012)

Music video
- "Dear My Friend" on YouTube

Dear My Friend is the third Japanese single released by South Korean boy band U-KISS. It was released on July 25, 2012 in Japan under Avex Trax.

== Single Information ==
The title track "Dear My Friend" was as the ending theme to the anime television “Arashi no Yoru ni Himitsu no Tomodachi“. The coupling track “Beautiful“, which was written by member AJ, has also earned a tie-up as the CM song for Kintetsu Department store’s “Passe Bazaar” CMs.

== Chart performance ==
The single debuted at fifth spot on Oricon Daily Single Chart. The single placed at 8th spot on its first week of chart run selling 22, 503 copies.

== Track listing ==
CD
No.	Title	Lyrics	Music	Length
1.	"Dear My Friend"	Odate Kei	H-Wonder
2.	"Beautiful"	AJ
3.	"Believe -Live ver.- 1st JAPAN LIVE TOUR 2012 3.25@Zepp Tokyo (First Press Only)"
4.	"Dear My Friend (Instrumental)"		H-Wonder
5.	"Beautiful (Instrumental)"

Limited Edition DVD
No.	Title	Length
1.	"Dear My Friend (Music Video)"
2.	"Dear My Friend (Music Video Making Movie) (First Press Only)"

== Chart ==
Chart (2012)	Peak position
Japan Oricon Daily Singles Chart	5
Japan Oricon Weekly Singles Chart	8

=== Sales ===
Chart	Sales
Oricon Monthly Singles Chart	24 055
