= Kevin Woo =

American singer and entertainer (born 1991)

- Woo in 2026

Background information
- Also known as: Woo Sung-hyun
- Born: November 25, 1991 (age 34); Seoul, South Korea
- Genre: K-pop
- Occupations: Singer; songwriter; television host
- Instruments: Vocals; guitar
- Years active: 2006–present
- Labels: XING; NH Media; Coridel
- Member of: UX1
- Formerly of: XING; U-KISS

Korean name
- Hangul: 우성현
- RR: U Seonghyeon
- MR: U Sŏnghyŏn

Kevin Woo (born November 25, 1991), also known mononymously as Kevin, is an American singer-songwriter and television host based in New York City. He is primarily known as a former member of South Korean boy band U-KISS from 2008 until 2017, as well as a host of various programs such as After School Club.

Born in Seoul and raised in California, he was discovered by South Korean entertainment agency XING Entertainment at the age of 15 and subsequently moved to South Korea. After a few months of training, Woo debuted as a member of boy group XING in 2006. After leaving the group two years later, he re-debuted as a member of U-KISS in August 2008.

In March 2017, he left U-KISS after his contract expired. Following his departure from U-KISS, Woo pursued a solo career in South Korea and Japan; he debuted as a soloist with his first single "Ride Along" in October 2018. He provided the singing voice for Mystery Saja in KPop Demon Hunters (2025).

== Life and career ==
=== 1991–2012: Early life and career beginnings ===
Woo was born in Seoul, South Korea in 1991, while his parents were visiting relatives. His parents and grandparents were first-generation immigrants who moved to the United States in the late 1970s. He grew up in Danville, California, where he lived with his parents and elder sister. He has also been described as a San Francisco native. He came from a family with a creative background; his mother was a fashion model in South Korea and his father was a pianist, while his paternal uncle, Emmanuel Woo, was an actor and classical opera singer in Germany. At the age of 15, Woo was initially discovered through a XING Entertainment audition. After he was accepted as a trainee, Woo and his mother moved to South Korea.

After a few months of training, Woo debuted as a first member generation of boy group XING in December 2006. After releasing three singles with the group, Woo left the group in April 2008. Following his departure, Woo signed with NH Media and re-debuted as a member of boy group U-KISS in August 2008.

In February 2009, Woo joined Arirang TV's radio show Pops in Seoul as a host of segment "All About You" alongside co-host Kim Isak. In December 2009, Woo with fellow U-KISS member Alexander released a single "Finally", which was composed by Brave Brothers.

In July 2010, Woo with U-KISS members Soohyun, Kibum, Kiseop and Dongho became a part of the drama I Am Legend, acting as a rock band. In August 2010, Woo with fellow members Alexander were selected as the new MCs for Arirang TV's music show The M-Wave.

On January 5, 2011, Woo participated in the musical On Air Live as the lead actor. He acted in a total of 26 shows, his last stage appearance coming on February 14, 2011. On March 17, Woo with U-KISS members Eli and Alexander quit MCing for Arirang's Radio School due to the loss of U-KISS members Alexander and Kibum from the group. On October 12, Woo with U-KISS members Eli announced that they would have a collaboration with Japanese singer JAMOSA from Avex label for her single "Together". The single was released on December 7 and the trio held release events at Lazone Kawasaki Plaza (December 9), Osaka Senri Selcy (December 10) and Asunal Kanayama (December 11). The song "Together" was then selected as the theme song for BeeTV's sweetTV. In November 2011, Woo and bandmate Eli were selected as MCs for Mnet's English-language version of M! Countdown, US M! Countdown.

In 2012, Woo and Soohyun remade UN's "Remember" for the drama Syndrome.

=== 2013–2017: U-KISS uBEAT and television roles ===
In April 2013, U-KISS' first sub-unit, uBEAT, was formed with Woo and fellow members Eli and AJ. The sub-unit debuted with the release of an EP titled I Should Have Treated You Better with a title track of the same name, which was composed by Brave Brothers. uBEAT made their debut stage at M! Countdown's special global edition in Taiwan. Woo alongside bandmates Soohyun, Eli and Kiseop participated in the drama KPOP The Ultimate Audition, having small cameo appearances in three episodes as a senior idol group to the main cast. Woo and Soohyun were selected to appear in the Korean adaptation of the musical Summer Snow alongside Super Junior's Sungmin, Supernova's Sungjae, SS501's Heo Young-saeng and FT Island's Seunghyun from April to June 2013. This was Woo's second musical.

On May 1, 2014, Woo was a guest on music talk show After School Club and from episode 43, he became a co-host alongside Eric Nam, Jae Park and Park Jimin. Woo graduated from the program and left as MC on April 10, 2018, after four years as host.

On March 1, 2017, NH Media announced that Woo would officially leave U-KISS following the expiration of his contract on March 31, 2017. He decided to continue his promotion with U-KISS until mid-April.

=== 2018–present: Solo career ===
Following his departure from U-KISS, Woo signed with Japan Music Entertainment to pursue his solo career in Japan. He also stated that he intended to pursue his career back in the United States. In October 2018, he debuted as a soloist with his single, "Ride Along", which he released in both Japanese and English.

Woo was part of the cast of the Korean adaptation of the musical Altar Boyz from February to March 2019. In July 2019, Woo was featured in British DJ duo Hollaphonic's single "Over You", which marked his first international collaboration. He debuted the song during his set at music festival KCON at its New York dates, fulfilling one of his dreams to perform at Madison Square Garden. He released his first extended play, Treasure, on July 31; it was preceded by its lead single "Freedom", which was Woo's first self-composed song. To promote the album, Woo embarked on his first solo tour, Come Alive Tour, spanning four dates in July and August 2019. Woo and former Royal Pirates bassist James Lee collaborated for the single "Falling", which was released on August 2. The duo promoted the single with a two-date concert tour in Los Angeles and San Francisco on August 24 to 25, and a music video released in November 6.

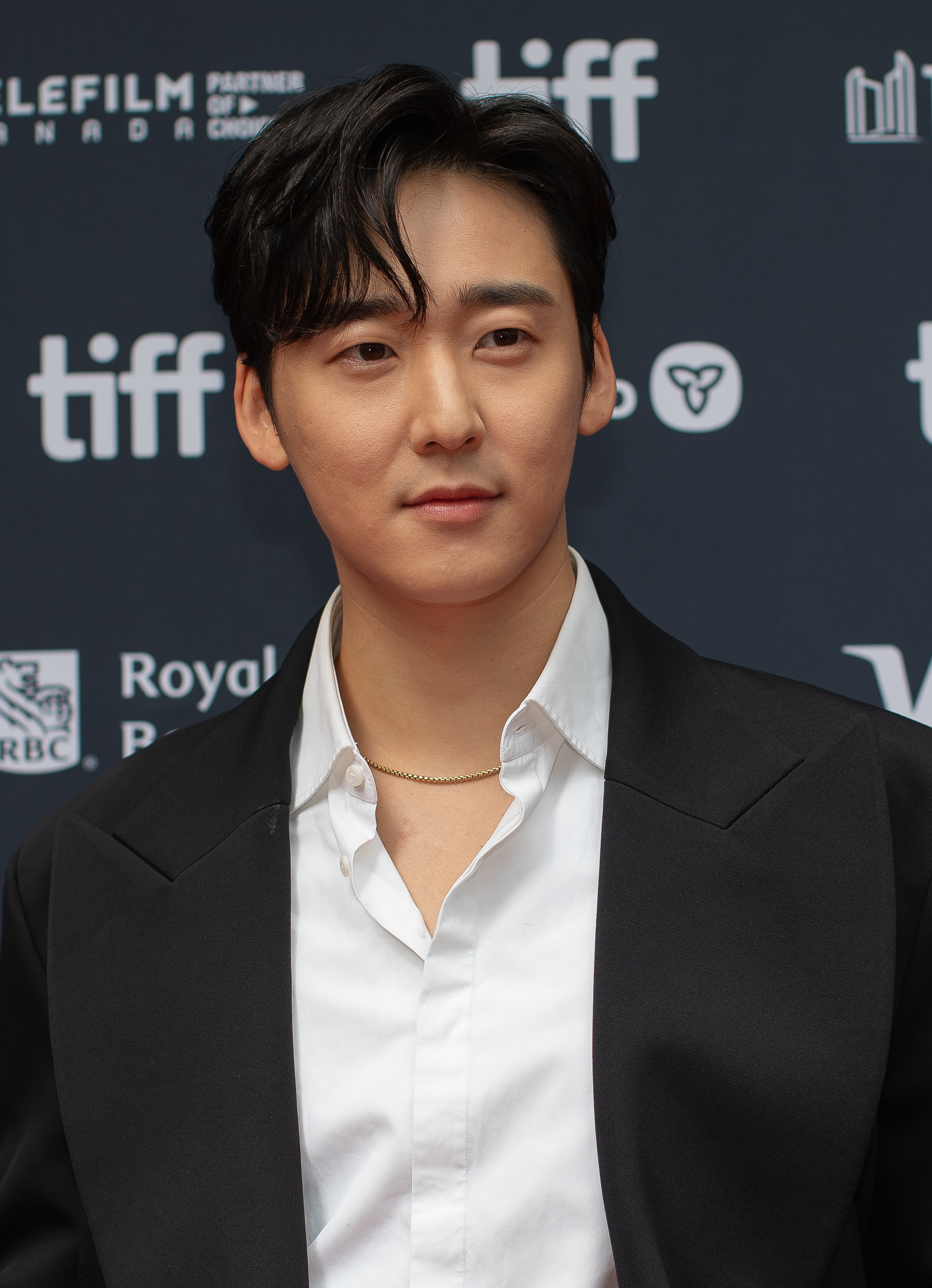
Woo at the 2024 Toronto International Film Festival

Woo joined the Live From Home livestream charity concert held on May 23, where proceeds benefitted the CDC Foundation's crisis fund for the COVID-19 pandemic. Woo temporarily rejoined U-KISS as a duo with Soohyun as part of a special throwback-themed "Guilty Pleasures" concert from SBS and its variety show MMTG in October 2020. The duo also performed "Shut Up!!" with Teen Top in a special collaboration stage. He joined the lineup of the 2nd annual Joy Ruckus Club concert, which was broadcast online on October 17 & 18.

In March 2021, it was announced that survival horror video game Dead by Daylight would feature a K-pop-themed killer called "The Trickster;" Woo was brought on as a consultant for the character's portrayal. He released his debut English single, "Got It", on June 29, through Sony Music Korea. The song was co-produced by Shintaro Yasuda and co-written by Woo. Woo released his first NFTs with KLKTN, an NFT platform where he serves as creative director.

Woo made his Broadway debut with the K-Pop inspired musical KPOP, which began previews on October 13, 2022, and opened on November 20 in New York City.

On November 1, 2025, Woo was announced as a member of UX1, a new subunit of U-KISS consisting of Woo, Hoon, and Kiseop. They will make their debut on November 26, 2025 with the digital single "Halo".

== Personal life ==
In a Japanese survey through popular fortune-telling site Cocoloni, Woo was ranked as the number one luckiest Hallyu star for 2012. 100 fortune-tellers participated in the survey, predicting the stars' fortunes through zodiac, blood type and other methods. When Woo received the news, he stated: "I'm honored to be ranked first. I want to make this really happen this year. U-KISS will go on a Japanese tour and we will also release our album. Please keep supporting us and help us rank first on the Oricon chart."

Woo resided in South Korea until 2021, the year he moved to Los Angeles, California. As of July 30, 2022, Woo currently resides in New York City. He is known to be active in social media, where he regularly posts on Twitter, Instagram, and TikTok.

== Discography ==
=== Extended plays ===
Title	Details
Treasure	Released: July 31, 2019 (JPN); Label: Japanese Music Entertainment; Formats: CD, digital download; Track listing: 1. "The Greatest Night"; 2. "Spark!"; 3. "君と僕の約束"; 4. "What's up" 5. "Beautiful Day" (Japanese); 6. "Dreamer"

=== Singles ===
Title	Year	Peak chart positions		Sales	Album
Title	Year	JPN	JPN Hot	Sales	Album
Japanese
"Don't Break Us Down"	2015	—	—	—N/a	Non-album single
"Make Me/Out of My life" (feat. K)	2016	7	30	JPN: 15,506	Make me/Out of my life
"Ride Along"	2018	—	—	—N/a	Ride Along
"Freedom"	2019	—	—	—N/a	Freedom
"Dreamer"	2019	—	—	—N/a	Treasure
English
"Ride Along (English version)"	2019	—	—	—N/a	Non-album singles
"Got It"	2021	—	—	—N/a	Non-album singles
"Deja Vu"	2025	—	—	—N/a	Non-album singles
"Ain't No Party"	2026	—	—	—N/a	Non-album singles
Korean
"Beautiful Day"	2019	—	—	—N/a	Non-album singles
"Falling (Korean version)" (with James Lee)	2019	—	—	—N/a	Non-album singles
"—" denotes releases that did not chart or were not released in that region.

=== Collaborations ===
Title	Year	Album
"Together" (with Jamosa, Eli Kim)	2011	Together
"Over You" (with Hollaphonic)	2019	Non-album singles
"Falling" (with James Lee)	2019	Non-album singles

=== Soundtrack appearances ===
List of soundtrack appearances, showing year released and name of the album
Title	Year	Peak chart positions										Certifications	Album
Title	Year	US	AUS	CAN	KOR	MLY	NZ	PHL Hot	SGP	UK	WW	Certifications	Album
"Camouflage"	2018	—	—	—	—	—	—	—	—	—	—		Top Management OST
"Soda Pop" (with Andrew Choi, Neckwav, Danny Chung, and SamUIL Lee as Saja Boys)	2025	3	4	5	2	5	3	6	3	3	3	RIAA: Platinum; ARIA: 2× Platinum; BPI: Platinum; MC: 3× Platinum; RMNZ: Platinum	KPop Demon Hunters OST
"Your Idol" (with Andrew Choi, Neckwav, Danny Chung, and SamUIL Lee as Saja Boys)	2025	4	4	8	6	3	4	14	4	5	3	RIAA: Platinum; ARIA: 2× Platinum; BPI: Platinum; MC: 2× Platinum; RMNZ: Platinum	KPop Demon Hunters OST
"—" denotes releases that did not chart or were not released in that region.

== Filmography ==
=== Films ===
Year	Title	Role	Notes
2024	K-Pops!	Kang	
2025	KPop Demon Hunters	Mystery Saja	Singing voice
2026	Death Name	Jun	

=== Television dramas ===
Year	Title	Network	Role	Notes
2010	I Am Legend	SBS	Kiss band member	Supporting
2012	K-POP Extreme Survival	Channel A	Himself as U-KISS member	Cameo
2015	About Love	Naver TV Cast	Kevin	Web-drama; Main role
2015	Let's Eat 2	tvN	Hye-rim's friend	Cameo

=== Musical theatre ===
Year	Title	Role	Notes/Ref.
2011	On Air Live		
2013	Summer Snow		
2014	On Air – Night Flight		
2017	Maybe Happy Ending	Oliver	Japanese production
2017	Altar Boyz		
2019	Altar Boyz		
2022	KPOP	Jun Hyuk	

=== Television shows ===
Year	Title	Network	Role	Notes
2010	The M-Wave	Arirang TV	Host	
2011	US MCountdown	Mnet	Host	
2014–2018	After School Club	Arirang TV	Co-host	Left to focus on music career.

=== Video games ===
Year	Title	Role	Notes/Ref.
2026	Dead by Daylight	Kwon Tae-young	

== Accolades ==
=== Awards and nominations ===
Year	Award	Category	Work	Result	Ref.
2025	K-World Dream Awards	Best OST	"Soda Pop" (Note: with Andrew Choi, Neckwav, Danny Chung, SamUIL Lee as Saja Boys)	Nominated	
2025	Korea Grand Music Awards	Best Virtual Artist	"Soda Pop"	Nominated	
2025	Korean American Story Gala	Trailblazer Award	Kevin Woo	Honored	
2025	MAMA Awards	Best OST	"Soda Pop"	Nominated	
2026	Annie Awards	Outstanding Achievement for Music in a Feature Production	KPop Demon Hunters (Note: with KPop Demon Hunters Music Team.)	Won	
2026	Dorian Award	Film Music of the Year	KPop Demon Hunters	Nominated	
2026	Music Awards Japan	Best Anime Song	"Soda Pop"	Longlisted	
2026	Music Awards Japan	Best K-Pop Song in Japan	"Soda Pop"	Longlisted	
2026	Music Awards Japan	International Song powered by Spotify	"Soda Pop"	Nominated	

=== Listicles ===
Name of publisher, year listed, name of listicle, and placement
Publisher	Year	Listicle	Placement	Ref.
Billboard Korea	2025	K-Pop Artist 100	73rd	
Luminate	2025	Most Streamed K-Pop Artist in US	5th	
Luminate	2025	Most Streamed K-Pop Artist in US	6th	

== See also ==
- Koreans in New York City
