= Shin Dong-ho =

South Korean singer

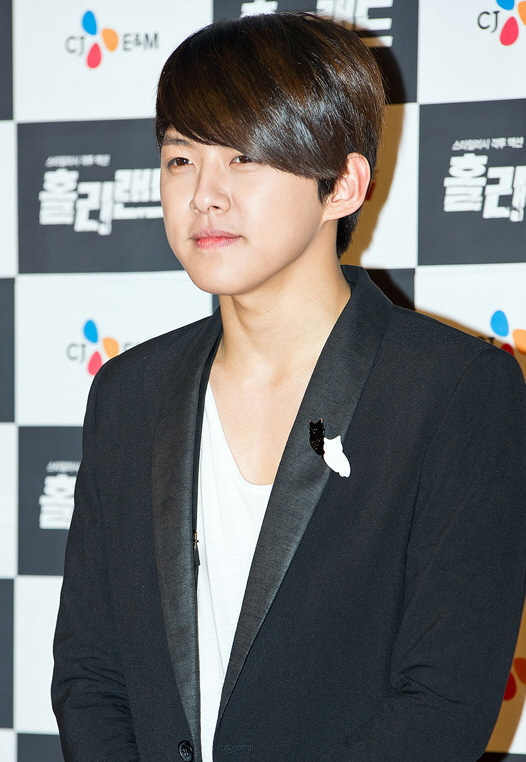
- Born: June 29, 1994 (age 32); Yeouido, South Korea
- Other name: DJ Justin
- Occupations: Singer; actor; DJ
- Spouse: Unknown (m. 2015; div. 2018)
- Children: 1
- Musical career
- Genres: K-pop
- Instruments: Vocals
- Years active: 2008–2013
- Label: NH Media (2008–2013)
- Formerly of: U-KISS

- Shin Dong-ho
- Hangul: 신동호
- Hanja: 申東澔
- RR: Sin Dongho
- MR: Sin Tongho

Shin Dong-ho (Korean: 신동호; born June 29, 1994) is a former South Korean singer who acquired fame as a singer of the boy group U-KISS. Dongho was the most active member of the group, appearing in a great many reality shows and other productions. He joined U-KISS in 2008 and stayed with them for five years.

== Life and career ==
He attended middle school in Seoul Yonggang Middle School and graduated from Hanlim Multi Art School. He became a trainee for NH Media and was chosen as one of the potential members for an upcoming boyband.

Dongho joined U-KISS in 2008, and appeared in reality shows such as Idol Maknae Rebellion, Raising Idol, and Sonyeon Sonyeo Gayo Baekseo.

His first acting role was a middle-school student in Villain and Widow, and performed in the MBC drama Royal Family. He voiced the lead character in a 3-D animation movie, Hong Gil Dong 2084 (2011). Along with co-U-KISS member Yeo Hoonmin he was cast for a TV-movie series, Holy Land (2012). He was the lead in Don't Cry Mommy. On October 16, 2013, NH media announced that Dongho left U-KISS. In the end, he chose to leave the entertainment industry entirely in 2013.

== Personal life ==
Dongho got married in 2015; he and his wife have a son. In September 2018, Dongho confirmed his divorce. He stated he and his wife did not separate due to a bad relationship so they will take responsibility for their child as parents despite not being a married couple. He added he hoped this will not affect his son as he grows up.

== Filmography ==
- 2010
  - Villain and Widow
- 2011
  - My Black Mini Dress
  - Mr. Idol (cameo)
  - Hong Gil Dong 2084
  - Royal Family
- 2012
  - Don't Cry Mommy
  - Holy Land
  - A Man Who Feeds The Dog
