= A Shared Dream =

Studio album by U-KISS
- Released: February 29, 2012
- Recorded: 2011–2012
- Genre: J-pop, electropop, synthpop, trance, eurobeat, R&B, dance-pop
- Label: Avex Trax

U-KISS chronology
Neverland (2011)	A Shared Dream (2012)	DoraDora (2012)

Alternative Cover

Singles from A Shared Dream
- 1. "Tick Tack" Released: December 14, 2011; 2. "A Shared Dream" Released: February 29, 2012; 3. "Forbidden Love" Released: February 29, 2012

A Shared Dream is the debut Japanese studio album by South Korean boy band U-KISS, released on February 29, 2012 by Avex Trax.

== Background and development ==
In May 2011, U-KISS formally signed under Avex Japan for their Japanese debut. Soon thereafter, an album entitled First Kiss, a compilation of all their songs from their debut Korean album up until their Break Time album, was released. A Japanese version of their Korean Bran New Kiss albums and their DVDs from their First Kiss Live in Osaka event were also released. On June 8, 2011, U-KISS went to stay in Japan for three months to prepare for their official Japanese debut. On November 18, 2011 Japan's Fuji TV Network revealed a preview for the music video of the lead single from U-KISS' first new material Japanese album, A Shared Dream, entitled "Tick Tack". On November 23, the full track of "Tick Tack" leaked online, and the full music video followed on December 5, 2011. U-KISS released the music video officially through their YouTube account on December 6, 2011. The song was released as a single, with the non-album B-side "Coincidence", on December 18, 2011.

== Singles and promotion ==
The album has a total of twelve tracks, which were mostly composed and recorded in high quality facilities in Japan. U-KISS made their official Japanese debut on December 14 with a live performance of "Tick Tack" on the Japanese TV show, Made in BS Japan. "A Shared Dream" was leaked on the internet on February 16, 2012. It is a heavy ballad, with a mixture of English and Japanese lyrics incorporated with piano. The single, "Forbidden Love" is a continuation of the style they had in "Man Man Ha Ni" (2008), "Bingeul Bingeul" (2010) and "Shut Up!" (2010). The group held a fan meeting event with 2,000 fans to celebrate the release of their albums and the very first performance of "Forbidden Love". The song was also performed on the March 16 episode of NTV‘s Happy Music. U-KISS also promoted on various radio stations such as Skip Beat, KPOP Street and Area Cross of Northwave FM, Now & Next and Groove of Air-G FM and on STV Radio. Aside from Radio promotions, the group also appeared on shows like DJ and Play Saturday of TVh.

== Track listing ==
Mu-mo Edition
No.	Title	Length
1.	"Tick Tack"	3:42
2.	"Forbidden Love"	3:32
3.	"Show Me Your Smile"	4:06
4.	"We Set Off!!"	4:27
5.	"A Shared Dream"	5:04
6.	"The Sound of Magic"	4:14
7.	"Orion"	5:26
8.	"Eeny, Meeny, Miny, Moe"	3:21
9.	"Man Man Ha Ni" (Japanese version)	3:32
10.	"Bingeul Bingeul" (Japanese version)	3:16
11.	"Shut Up!" (Japanese version)	3:13
12.	"Believe"	4:44

Jacket B
No.	Title	Length
13.	"Tick Tack- Marcan Mix"

CD+DVD Jacket A
No.	Title	Length
13.	"Tick Tack (Music Video)"
14.	"Forbidden Love (Music Video)"
15.	"A Shared Dream (Music Video)"

Limited Edition
No.	Title	Length
16.	"A Shared Dream (Music Video Making Movie)"

== Chart performance ==
The album debuted at number 6 on the daily edition of the Oricon Chart being the album with the highest entry in the Top 50. The album peaked at number 5 on the Oricon weekly charts. "Tick Tack" reached number 5 on the Oricon Weekly Singles Chart.

Chart	Peak position	Sales total
Oricon Weekly Albums Chart	5	
Oricon Monthly Albums Chart	37	13,138
