= Mr. Idol =

- Hangul: Mr. 아이돌
- RR: Mr. aidol
- MR: Mr. aidol
- Directed by: Ra Hee-chan
- Written by: Lee Gyu-bok; Ra Hee-chan
- Produced by: Kim Seong-cheol
- Starring: Park Ye-jin; Ji Hyun-woo
- Cinematography: Park Yong-soo
- Edited by: Moon In-dae
- Music by: Park Gyeong-jin
- Release date: November 3, 2011
- Running time: 114 minutes
- Country: South Korea
- Language: Korean

Mr. Idol (Korean: Mr. 아이돌) is a 2011 South Korean film written and directed by Ra Hee-chan. Ra called it, "a movie that captures young people's dreams through music."

Ji Hyun-woo, Jay Park, Jang Seo-won and Randy Kim play four young men who come from different walks of life to form an idol band, united by their love of music. Though musically talented, they are far from mass-produced pop material, and the movie portrays their rigorous training process under a producer (Park Ye-jin). But a powerful figure in the music industry (Kim Soo-ro) tries to interfere with their rise to superstardom.

== Plot ==
Oh Goo-joo was once a famous producer, but she left the music industry after one of her idol group members died in an accident. One day, she encounters Lee Yoo-jin who was kicked out of an agency called Star Music after years of training to become a singer. Goo-joo believes Yoo-jin could be a star and produces an idol group called Mr. Children. Its members include: the leader Yoo-jin who cares only about singing; dancer Ji-oh who is the one and only person possessing an idol-like air in the band; vocalist Hyun who used to run a karaoke; and rapper Ricky who learned Korean through rapping. They go through intense training under Oh Goo-joo.

Soon, the band attracts public attention, and their fans increase exponentially. They become the most famous rookies in K-pop in 2011. But Sa Hee-moon, the Korean music industry tycoon who heads Star Music, regards Mr. Children as a real pain in the neck, and tries everything to make the band break up. Just seven days before the K-pop Festival, Star Music uploads an old video of Yoo-jin in which he shared his disparaging view of K-pop music. The video spreads and rumblings of disbanding are heard. Can Mr. Children survive in this cutthroat music industry and become the idols of the nation?

== Cast ==
- Park Ye-jin - Oh Goo-joo
- Ji Hyun-woo - Lee Yoo-jin
- Kim Soo-ro - Sa Hee-moon
- Im Won-hee - Park Sang-sik
- Jay Park - Ji-oh
- Jang Seo-won - Hyun-yi
- Randy Kim - Ricky
- Ko Chang-seok - Han Jong-tak
- Jang Young-nam - Lee Mi-ri
- Joo Jin-mo - Yoo-jin's father
- Lee Seung-ha - Soo-hyun
- Ahn Seo-hyun - Han Eun-seo
- Lee Jae-yong - Director Hwang
- Lee Cheol-min - chief guide
- Lee Young-yi - Ricky's mother
- Goo Seung-hyun - Han Eun-gi
- Lee Sang-hoon - Rebel Without a Cause bassist
- Chun Sung-hoon - Rebel Without a Cause drummer
- Kim Min-sang - Rebel Without a Cause guitarist
- Park Ji-yeon - Hyun-yi's wife
- Nam Sang-ran - tarot cafe owner
- Han Ye-rin - bad high school student 2
- Lee Jin-hee - Reporter Lee
- Park Yoon-ho - Reporter Park
- Park Chul-min - broadcast station chief producer (cameo)
- Nam Gyu-ri - Mi-oh (cameo)
- Lee Hyun-jin - Kim Ji-hoon
- U-KISS - Wonder Boys (cameo)
- Lee Han-wi - Hong Gil-dong (cameo)
- Bang Yong-guk - himself (cameo)
- Kim Him-chan - himself (cameo)
- Brave Girls - themselves (cameo)
- Chocolat - themselves (cameo)
