= Bran New Kiss =

- Korean edition and Japanese CD only cover

EP by U-KISS
- Released: March 30, 2011
- Recorded: 2011
- Genre: K-pop, electropop
- Length: 18:16
- Label: NH Media, LOEN Entertainment (South Korea); L200000844; Avex Trax (Japan)

U-KISS chronology
Break Time (2010)	Bran New Kiss (2011)	Neverland (2011)

Alternative Cover

Alternative cover

Singles from Bran New Kiss
- 1. "0330" Released: March 30, 2011

Bran New Kiss (Korean: 브랜드 뉴 키스) is the fifth extended play released by South Korean boy band U-KISS. It is the first EP to feature new members Hoon and AJ.

== Background and release ==
In November 2010, the band's management announced that U-KISS had been recording new tracks for an upcoming EP. On March 30, 2011, the group released their fifth EP, Bran New Kiss with the lead single "0330". This was the first single that featured the two new band members, AJ and Hoon. The music video for the EP's single, "0330" was released March 29, the same day as the digital download, via YouTube. An alternate version of the music video for "0330", noted as a "Drama Version", was released on April 1 via Mnet. Some lines of the song were composed by new band member, AJ who is fluent in English and has a background in song writing. According to AJ in an interview, "r squared pi is the circle that we're inside together...the place where we are, like the memories that we made...so don't deny our r squared pi is like 'don't deny our circle'...our hidden circle we made together".

The song's music video is tells the story of the main character pretending that his girlfriend is still alive after she died at 03:30 hours. Shin Dongho is the main actor for the music video. It starts with a piano in the middle of the forest with a clock switching to 03:30. Romantic scenes follow as the song goes on, but in the middle of the video, a short flash back shows that Dongho is just pretending or dreaming or remembering that he is with the girl. He doesn't want to accept her death so he lives on, pretending that she is still with him. His friends go along with it, knowing that it is hard for him, but they don't want to see their friend suffer. They try to teach Dongho to move on and begin a new life. He then accepts that she is gone and faces the reality. At the climax of the song, U-KISS is standing on the roof top of a building in the autumn and the video ends with a dream, with Dongho teaching the girl in white how to play the piano. A different version of the video was released on April 3, 2011 which focuses more on the drama of the story. However, there are no major differences noted between the two videos.

The digital version of the album was released on March 30, 2011 and the physical on April 1 in South Korea. The song was first performed on Mnet's M-Countdown on March 31, and on other shows such as Music Core and Music Bank. On April 15, 2011, U-KISS performed "0330" on KBS's Yoo Hee-yeol's Sketchbook. Bran New Kiss made it to number 2 on South Korea's Gaon Weekly Albums Chart and "0330" landed at number 27 on Gaon's Weekly Digital Songs Chart.

A Japanese version of the EP was released on August 24, 2011 in 3 versions: 2 CD+DVD versions and one CD-only. The CD-only edition comes with a Japanese version of the single "0330". The album debuted on the Japanese Oricon chart at number 5 on the first day of release, climbing to number 3 the following day. On August 3, 2011, U-KISS performed the Japanese version of "0330" on a Japanese show, Bomber-E.

== Track listing ==
No.	Title	Length
1.	"It's Time (Intro)"	1:31
2.	"0330"	3:29
3.	"내게 아픈 말은..." (Words That Hurt Me...)	3:28
4.	"Every Day"	3:27
5.	"I Don't Understand"	3:16
6.	"Miracle"	3:08
Total length:		18:16

Japanese single – CD Only
No.	Title	Length
7.	"0330" (Japanese version)	3:30
Total length:		22:04

DVD – Japanese Version (Type A)
No.	Title	Length
1.	"U-KISS Visit to Japan" (Offshoot Movie)

DVD – Taiwan and Japanese Version (Type B)
No.	Title	Length
1.	"0330" (Music video – Korean version)

== Charts ==
Chart	Peak position
South Korea Gaon Weekly album chart	2
South Korea Gaon Monthly album chart	9
Japan Oricon Daily albums chart	3
Japan Oricon Weekly albums chart	7
Japan Oricon Monthly albums chart	39

=== Sales and certifications ===
Chart	Amount
Gaon physical sales	20,216
Oricon physical sales	13,012

== Release history ==
Country	Date	Format	Label
South Korea	March 30, 2011	Digital download	NH Media; LOEN Entertainment
South Korea	April 1, 2011	CD	NH Media; LOEN Entertainment
Japan	August 24, 2011	CD, Digital download	Avex Trax
Thailand	September 5, 2011	CD	Sony Music
Philippines	October 22, 2011	CD	Sony Ivory
Taiwan	September 8, 2011	CD+DVD	Alpha Music
