= U-KISS =

South Korean boy band

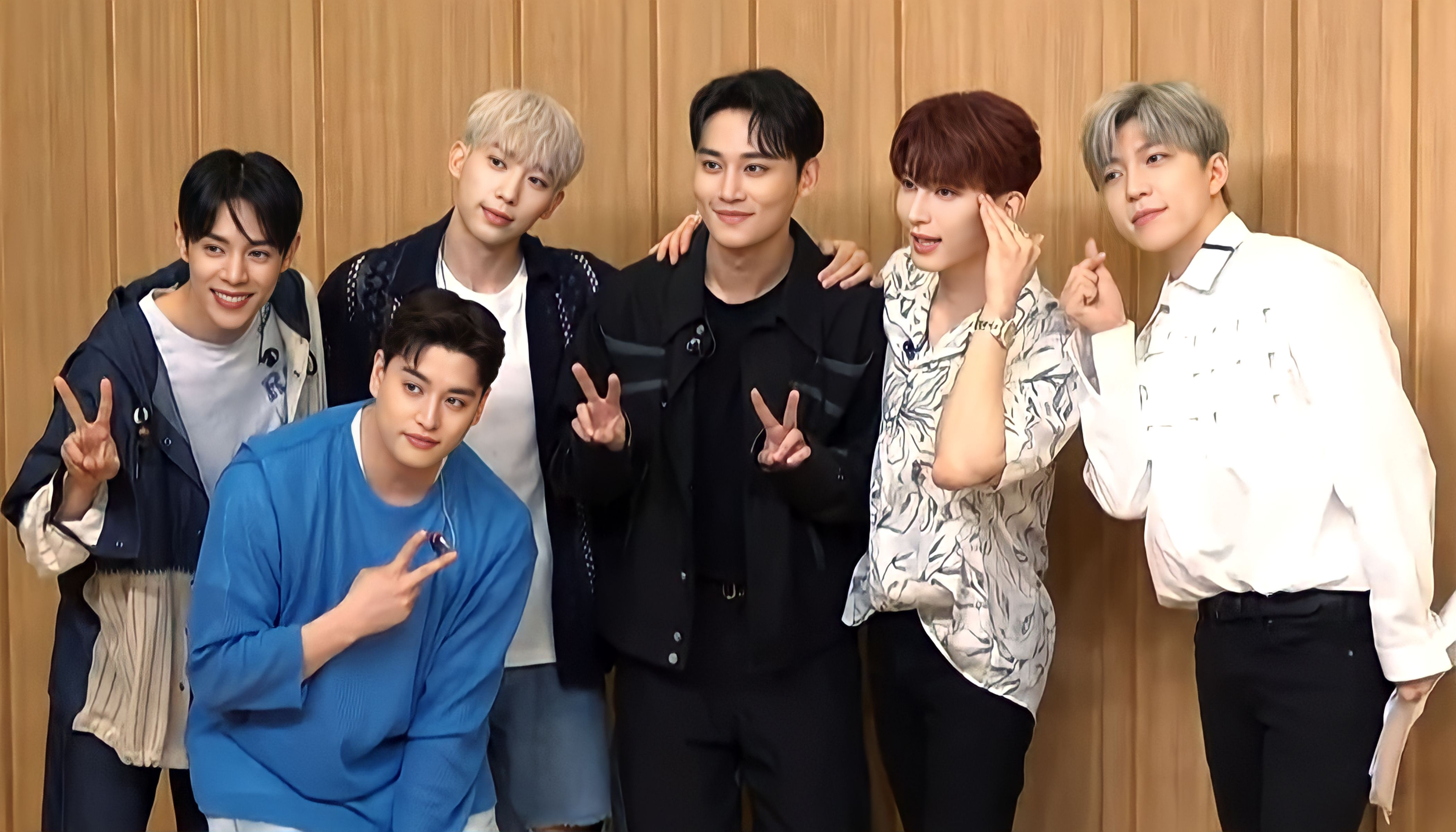
- U-KISS in June 2023; From left to right: Alexander, Eli, Hoon, AJ, Kiseop and Soohyun

Background information
- Origin: Seoul, South Korea
- Genres: K-pop; J-pop
- Years active: 2008–present
- Label: NH Media
- Spinoffs: uBEAT; Kiseop & Hoon; Soohyun & Hoon; UX1
- Members: Soohyun; Hoon; Kiseop; Alexander; Eli
- Past members: Kim Ki-bum; Dongho; Kevin; AJ; Jun
- Website: Official website

U-KISS (Korean: 유키스; Japanese: ユーキス) is a South Korean boy band formed in 2008. Their name is an acronym, standing for Ubiquitous Korean International Idol Super Star. The group is composed of Soohyun, Hoon, Kiseop, Alexander Lee, and Eli.

Their breakthrough hit was "Man Man Ha Ni" (2009) from their EP ContiUKiss. They made their formal debut in Japan in 2011 with the release of the single "Tick Tack".

Since their debut, U-KISS has released three full-length albums, twelve mini-albums/EPs, one special mini-album (created for their fans), and various singles. They have released seven Japanese full-length albums, one Japanese compilation album, and five Japanese mini-albums/EPs. The group and individual members have also participated in various musicals, radio programs, web shows, TV series, and films.

The group has recorded or performed songs in Korean, Japanese, Chinese, English and Spanish. U-KISS has earned six entries on Billboard's World Albums chart and has had 9 songs on the K-pop Hot 100 chart.

In 2012, U-KISS was the first K-pop group to hold a fan meeting in Cambodia. During that same year, U-KISS was not only the first K-pop act, but also the first Asian group, to perform at the "Los 40 Principales" concert in Colombia. In 2013, U-KISS was the second Korean artist to hold a solo concert in Mexico. U-KISS was also one of the first K-pop groups to release original albums in Japanese. In Japan, they ranked #1 on the Oricon Albums Chart with Action in 2015.

== History ==
=== 2008: Formation and debut ===
U-KISS was formed as a six-member boy band in 2008. Kibum and Kevin were previously members of the boy band XING, but had left that group in early 2007. The other four members were all individually selected by NH Media through auditions. U-KISS held their first showcase on August 16 (originally planned to be on July 27) in Tokyo Takeshiba NONAME.

U-KISS made their first performed on August 15, 2008, at Power of Atamix 08 in Japan. The group made their official debut in Korea with performing "Not Young" on the music program M Countdown. Their first EP New Generation later released on September 3.

Although they were newcomers in the industry, U-KISS was considered for a Japan–Korea collaborative project. A Japanese entertainment company, Yashimoto Group, invested 150 billion KRW to develop U-KISS into an internationally known group.

=== 2009–2010: Line-up change, Only One, and first tours ===
On February 3, 2009, U-KISS released their second EP Bring It Back 2 Old School, with the lead single "I Like You", which gained them popularity especially in Thailand.

On November 6, their third EP ContiUKiss was released with the lead single "Man Man Ha Ni" and new member Kiseop joined as the seventh member of the group.

On February 3, 2010, U-Kiss's first full-length album Only One was released. Their lead single "Bingeul Bingeul" of the album, generating their highest chart-topping single in the Philippines. The song peaked at #2 on the MYX Music Channel Hit and International Top 20 charts for the period of April 25 – May 1. The support of Filipino fans helped it stay on the Philippines' MYX Music Channel charts for more than a month. The album also topped Hanteo Charts, Hot Tracks, Syn-nara Records, and Evan Records in just one day. U-KISS promoting the album in Malaysia, Mongolia, and Japan. U-KISS promoted the album in the Philippines through a series of mall shows, where they sold more than 1,000 copies in one day, breaking the record for the highest sales in a launch and earning a million pesos. Due to its success, the group had their first major concert in the Philippines, later released on DVD as U-KISS First Kiss Tour in Manila.

On October 4, U-Kiss's fourth EP Break Time was released, with the lead single "Shut Up!". The U-KISS First Kiss Live in Tokyo & Osaka (2010) concerts were held December 6 in Osaka and December 10 in Tokyo. On December 10, their Japanese compilation album, First Kiss, placed #2 on the Oricon daily charts on the day of its release. In addition to their music career, U-KISS starred in their own variety shows, including All About U-KISS, UKISS Vampire, and Chef Kiss.

=== 2011–2012: Line-up changes, NEVERLAND, and Japanese debut ===
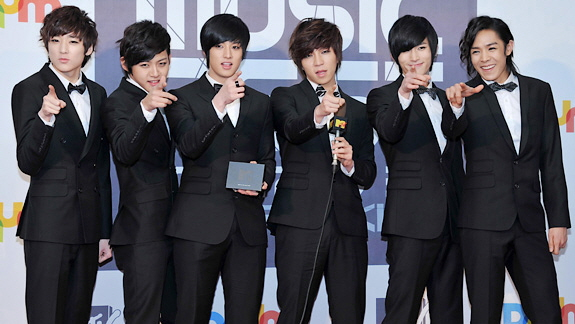
U-KISS in 2011

In 2011, Member Soohyun was officially appointed the leader of U-KISS and the departure of Alexander and Kibum was replaced by former Paran member AJ and a former solo artist, Hoon. As a result, a U.S. album was canceled due to member termination of contract.

Following the new formation of U-KISS, they released their fifth EP Bran New Kiss, with the ballad lead single "0330" on March 30. U-KISS released the Japanese version of Bran New Kiss on August 24. The EP reached #3 on Japan's daily Oricon Albums Chart. On September 1, U-KISS released their second full-length album, Neverland, with the double lead singles "Neverland" and "Someday". At the Asia Song Festival in October, The Korea Foundation for International Culture Exchange selected U-KISS as an Asia Influential Artist. On December 14, U-KISS released their first Japanese single, "Tick Tack", which marked the group's official Japanese debut date after signing a contract with Avex Trax. Later that year, member AJ was accepted to Columbia University in the United States.

In 2012, U-KISS was chosen as the #1 Hallyu Group to Watch in Japan, while Kevin was chosen as the Luckiest Hallyu Star of 2012. On February 8, U-KISS participated in the Music Bank concert held in Paris, France. It featured a special presentation by Soohyun singing a duet with Sistar's Hyolyn of "Love Always Finds a Reason", with the original English lyrics. On February 29, U-KISS released their second Japanese single, "Forbidden Love", simultaneously with their first Japanese full-length album, A Shared Dream. "Forbidden Love" ranked #9 on the Oricon Daily Single Chart, while A Shared Dream ranked #6 on the Oricon Daily Album Chart.

U-KISS held a sold-out concert tour, "U-KISS 1st Japan Live Tour 2012", in Zepp Hall venues across Japan. The tour lasted from March 2–25. In the second week of June, two additional shows were also sold out. The U-KISS Japan Live Tour "A Shared Dream" (2012) held performances on March 2 in Sapporo, March 4 in Sendai, March 10 in Osaka, March 11 in Fukuoka, March 17 in Nagoya, and March 24–25 in Tokyo. Due to its success, more dates were added: July 7 in Hiroshima, July 8 in Osaka, July 14 in Sendai, July 16 in Nagoya, July 18 in Fukuoka, July 20 in Nagasaki, July 25 in Sapporo, July 27 in Niigata, and July 28–29 in Tokyo. A DVD titled U-KISS Days in Japan debuted at #8 on the Oricon Daily Chart published on March 30.

On April 25, U-KISS released their sixth EP DoraDora. In May, "DoraDora" gained the #1 spot on the German Asian Music Chart. On May 12, U-KISS became not only the first K-pop act, but also the first Asian group, to perform in Colombia at "Los 40 Principales" (the biggest pop concert in Latin America) along with Shakira. The group's seventh EP The Special to Kissme was released on June 5. On June 1, the second single from it, "Te Amo", had been released on various music sites and immediately placed #4 on Soribada. On July 2, U-KISS performed at the 2012 K-POP Nation Concert in Macao, along with Girls' Generation and SHINee. On July 5, U-KISS released their third Japanese single, "Dear My Friend" and later was used as the theme song for a Japanese anime movie, Stormy Night (Secret Friends). On July 29, it was announced during the Japanese Live Tour that AJ would be take hiatus for 5 months and would no longer attend U-KISS activities starting in August, in order to concentrate on his studies. According to NH Media, AJ would return in early 2013, and the U-KISS comeback in September 2012 would only feature six members.

Before AJ's temporary departure from the group, U-KISS attended the A-Nation opening ceremony at the Tokyo National Stadium on August 3. On August 9, 2012, U-KISS represented Korea in Asia Progress M, part of A-Nation, the biggest music festival in Japan. On August 26, the group also performed with Hamasaki Ayumi, M-Flo, and Big Bang at Ajinomoto Stadium.

On September 5, the group ended their Japanese tour with the U-KISS Japan Live in Budokan (2012), where they attracted an audience of 10,000, their biggest to date. Meanwhile, the group released their fourth Japanese single, "One of You", on September 5. During its first week, it peaked at #1 on the Tower Records weekly chart. On September 14, U-KISS received a special achievement award in recognition of their contribution to the Hallyu Wave. The group attended Arirang TV's celebration event for the milestone of reaching over 100 million clients. At the event, U-KISS was awarded the Special Hallyu Achievement Award from the minister of the Ministry of Culture, Sports, and Tourism. On September 20, the group released their seventh EP, Stop Girl, and planned to actively promote it in 10 countries including Thailand, the Philippines, the United States, and China. The mini-album also included an English version of the title track, "Stop Girl". U-KISS released their fifth Japanese single, "Distance", on December 12.

=== 2013–2014: Collage and line-up changes ===
On January 19, 2013, U-KISS participated in the Dream KPOP Fantasy Concert in Manila, Philippines. The Japanese single "Alone" was released on February 13. It was used as the theme song for NHK's TV drama, Bookstore Worker Michiru's Personal Story. U-KISS released their third full-length album Collage on March 7, with the lead single, "Standing Still" (composed by Ryan Jhun), was released on March 6. The group also performed at the "Formula 1" event held at the Petronas Tower in Malaysia on March 22, sharing the stage with K-pop group 2NE1 and American artists Backstreet Boys and Demi Lovato.

The sub-unit uBEAT debuted at the end of April, composed of Eli and AJ, with Kevin featuring as the main vocalist. In June, U-KISS went on tour in Latin America, traveling to Peru, Colombia, and Mexico. The group became the second Korean artist to have a solo concert in Mexico, after JYJ's Junsu. With 4,000 tickets were sold out and fans who did not get tickets sang along with the songs outside the concert hall. U-KISS performed a Spanish version of "Dear My Friend", specially prepared for their Latin American fans. Just the previous year, U-KISS had launched their official South American fan club.

Avex Trax announced that U-KISS would release their second full-length Japanese album, Inside øf Me, on July 24. Their Japan Live Tour "Inside of Me" was held performances on July 27 in Yokohama, July 30–31 in Tokyo, August 7 in Fukuoka, August 12–13 in Osaka, August 22 in Hokkaido, August 26 in Tokyo (added because two previous Tokyo concerts sold out), and August 30 in Aichi. In October 2013, Dongho departure from the group due to health and personal issues. On October 30, U-KISS released their eighth EP, Moments. Their lead single "She's Mine" was describe mixed R&B and hip-hop, which were genres that the group had not tried before. On December 15, U-KISS participated in the 15th Korea–China Music Festival in Beijing. It featured a special presentation by Soohyun singing a duet with Wanting Qu of "You Exist in My Song", with the original Chinese lyrics.

In January 2014, U-KISS toured America, making stops in New York, San Francisco, and Los Angeles. Presales of VIP tickets sold out in just 30 seconds for the Los Angeles date, and eight minutes for the one in New York. U-KISS also appeared on ABC's national TV program, Good Morning, America. On May 15, NH Media introduced new member Jun through U-KISS' official Korean website to replace the positions of AJ due to his hiatus while he continued his studies at Columbia University. On June 2, Jun officially made his debut with U-KISS following the released their 9th EP, Mono Scandal, with the 19+ rated MV for lead single "Quit Playing". With this song, U-KISS become the first boy band to be temporarily banned from broadcast in South Korea for "inappropriate choreography", causing them to make changes to the original dance routine.

The "U-KISS JAPAN LIVE TOUR 2014" started with a performance in Tokyo on July 16, toured 12 cities, and attracted a total of about 120,000 attendees. U-KISS finished the tour with their 2nd performance at the Budokan on September 12, which was called "U-KISS Japan ～Returns in Budokan～". Their Europe tour "Scandal" was held performances on September 21 in Moscow, September 24 in London, and September 28 in Paris. In Paris, they were the subject of an exclusive video documentary.

=== 2015: Always ===
U-KISS made an appearance on M! Countdown with a performance of their single "Playground" on January 22, 2015. This single was later released along with their tenth mini-album, Always, on January 23. On March 3, U-KISS accepted SBS MTV's The Show – China Choice award for "Playground", their 1st trophy won on a weekly music show. U-KISS' 4th Japanese album, Action, was released on March 18. It charted #2 on the Oricon Daily Chart the day of release, and then topped the chart at #1 on the day after release. It also ranked at #4 on the Oricon Weekly Chart, with 20,297 copies sold.

The U-KISS Japan Live Tour "Action" (2015) held performances on August 16 in Osaka, August 18–19 in Tokyo, August 22 in Hokkaido, August 24–25 in Aichi, August 27 in Osaka, August 28 in Fukuoka, and August 30 in Miyagi. U-KISS released their 11th Japanese single, "Stay Gold", on September 9. It charted #2 on the Oricon Daily Chart and #3 on the Oricon Weekly Chart, with a total reported sales of 44,418. On December 23, U-KISS continued their Japanese promotions with the release of their first Christmas mini-album, simply titled The Christmas Album.

=== 2016–2017: Stalker and line-up changes ===
On February 23, 2016, U-KISS released their 12th Japanese single Kissing to Feel, and their fifth Japanese album, One Shot One Kill, on March 23. U-KISS' 11th Korean EP, Stalker, was released on June 7. On August 29, AJ announced that his contract had expired with NH Media, and he officially left the group. The U-KISS Japan Best Live Tour ～5th Anniversary Special～ (2016) held performances on December 2 in Fukuoka, December 4 in Hiroshima, December 9–10 in Hyogo, December 15 in Aichi, December 23 in Miyagi, and December 25 in Kanagawa.

On March 2, 2017, Kevin announced his official departure from the group after his contract had expired with NH Media. U-KISS continued to be active as a five-member group. Soohyun and Eli, the remaining original members, renewed their contracts with NH Media. On May 5, U-KISS was the headline act for a K-pop concert that was a finale of the week-long Seoul Food Festival. They were supported by their label mates, Laboum. U-KISS contributed a song, "RUN A WAY", to the OST for KBS2's TV drama Manhole, which aired August–September and starred Jaejoong from JYJ. On August 20, 2017, U-KISS performed at The Star of Asia music festival in Kazakhstan, where they were presented with a special prize trophy during the broadcast on KAZAKH TV. On September 6, NH Media reported that Kiseop had suffered second-degree burn injuries due to an explosion that took place during the group's "FLY" music video filming. They went on to explain that ten fragments of material had become lodged in his body and that he had been transferred to a hospital in Incheon to receive treatment.

U-KISS held a tour of Japan called "U-KISS LIVE EVENT 2017 ~Stay with U~", performing September 30 in Chiba, October 7 in Saitama, and October 9 in Osaka. On October 10, U-KISS' Japanese single, "FLY", ranked #3 on the daily Oricon Singles Chart. This achievement was even more meaningful because all the members took part in producing the EDM-influenced song and its accompanying tracks. U-KISS contributed an English-language cover version of Shakira's "Try Everything" (from the movie Zootopia) to the compilation album Thank You Disney, which was released on October 25. On November 20–21, U-KISS held the "2017 U-KISS FANMEETING IN KOREA ~KISS HOLIC~". On December 9, U-KISS put on a special concert in Tokyo for an ongoing endorsement with CHIC-Smart electric scooters. On December 26, U-KISS released a Korean digital single, "Ready for U". On December 28, Soohyun enlisted in the Army for his mandatory military service.

=== 2018–2019: 10th anniversary and members departure ===
On March 31, 2018, U-KISS released their 7th Japanese full-length album, LINK, which included songs recorded by Soohyun before his enlistment. It ranked #3 on the daily Oricon Albums Chart. All the members of U-KISS (including Soohyun, who was on temporary leave from military duty) celebrated the 10th anniversary of their Korean debut. On October 10, the group returned with their 15th Japanese single "Scandal", which ranked #8 on the Billboard Japan Hot 100 chart. On December 19, U-KISS released their 8th Japanese full-length album, Glory, which featured a Christmas song for the title track. The song was used in an endorsement for Huis Ten Bosch, one of the biggest theme parks in Japan.

On March 18, 2019, Hoon enlisted in the Marine Corp for his mandatory military service. On May 16, nhemg (NH Media) announced that Eli and Kiseop left the group after their contracts expired with the agency. On September 1, Soohyun completed his mandatory military service and was discharged from the Army. Soon after, "Soohyun & Jun (from U-KISS) Fan Meeting in SEOUL ～autumn memory～" was held on September 22–23. To honor the 8th anniversary of U-KISS' Japanese debut on December 14, Soohyun will hold an anniversary talk and video screening of "JUN (from U-KISS) 1st Event 2019 ~Phenomenal World~" in Tokyo.

=== 2020–2021: Reunions and departure from NH Media ===
Kevin temporarily rejoined U-KISS as a duo with Soohyun as part of a special throwback-themed "Guilty Pleasures" concert from SBS and its variety show MMTG in October 2020. The duo also performed "Shut Up!!" with Teen Top in a special collaboration stage.

On October 20, Hoon completed his mandatory military service and was discharged from the Marine Corps. On October 21, 2020, Soohyun and Jun released the Japanese single "Eyes on Me" and the ballad track "星も見えない夜に".

U-KISS' second sub-unit, Soohyun & Hoon, was formed and released the single 'I Wish' in both Korean and Japanese in 2021. The Korean version was released on January 27, and the Japanese version on February 24. Soohyun left NH Media on April 15 following his contract expiration; however, he stated he will remain as part of U-KISS. In August, Hoon and Jun also left NH Media after their contracts expired.

=== 2022–present: New label and 15th anniversary project ===
On January 24, 2022, Soohyun, Hoon, and Kiseop signed exclusive contracts with Tango Music, with Kiseop officially rejoining U-KISS. In May 2022, U-KISS launched an official YouTube channel and announcement of various activities.

On May 15, 2023, it was announced that U-KISS would be releasing an EP in June as a six-member group to celebrate their 15th anniversary. The extended play, Play List, was released on June 28 under Tango Music, and featured the return of Alexander, Eli, and AJ to participate in the group's anniversary project promotions. The group held two concerts on July 28 at the Zepp Haneda in Tokyo and July 30 at the Zepp Hamba in Osaka, Japan.

On September 21, 2023, Tango Music announced on the group's official fan café and social media that U-KISS would now be a 5-member group as Alexander and Eli signed exclusive contracts with the company, while AJ remained open to future activities due to his affection for the group. This marks Alexander and Eli's official return to the group after they left in 2011 and 2019 respectively.

On April 25, 2024, U-KISS announced the schedule for their comeback. They released a pre-release single "Morse Code" on April 29, another pre-release single "Beautiful You Are" on May 30, a 13th mini album Let's Get Started released on June 25 and a fan concert in June, and a Japan concert in July.

On November 1, 2025, UX1, a new sub-unit of U-KISS, was announced, consisting of Hoon, Kiseop, and former member Kevin. The group will debut on November 26 with their single "Halo".

== Philanthropy ==
On June 7, 2011, U-KISS – along with other K-pop groups including 2NE1, MBLAQ, 4Minute, F.T. Island and B2ST – held a special show called "Seoul-Osaka Music of Hearts", raising funds to help victims of the 2011 Japan earthquake. Earlier in March of that year, U-KISS had volunteered to take part in another fundraising concert put on by veteran Korean singers for the same cause, where they worked together with several boy and girl bands to answer donation phone calls.

On June 18, 2012, U-KISS became the first K-pop group to hold a fan meeting in Cambodia, called "Share the Love Charity Concert". The fan meeting led to a charity organization in a nearby school, where members interacted with the children, passing out baseball bats and other baseball equipment. The show, as a part of the benefit project, was sponsored by famous Cambodians and was even attended by the prime minister of Cambodia, Hun Sen.

On February 1, 2013, Soohyun and Kevin hosted a charity event for Jakarta after the heavy flooding in Indonesia. They auctioned 2 CDs, with which they interacted to raise the value, along with clothing that they had worn. Two albums were auctioned live, with total proceeds of Rp3.500.000 (roughly US$350). The two members also held a press conference explaining why their showcase would be postponed to April. Along with the press conference, they also visited Pluit, where they held the charity session and interacted with kids who were affected by the flooding.

On June 6, 2016, U-KISS revealed that a portion of the proceeds from their Stalker album sales would be donated to the Culture and Arts Education Division of AbleArt Center, which helps disabled artists.

After the 2022 Russian invasion of Ukraine U-KISS become the first K-pop group to publicly announce and provide support for Ukraine. U-KISS members Soohyun, Kiseop, and Hoon donated 10 million KRW (about $8,200 USD) on March 3, 2022.

== Endorsements ==
Photos of the members were featured on Visa credit cards issued by The Sumitomo Mitsui Banking Corporation (one of Japan's top three banks). Card users accumulated points that could be redeemed for U-KISS merchandise. U-KISS was the first K-pop band to be featured on Sumitomo's Visa cards. U-KISS also collaborated with Dresscode Inc to create special clothing for their Korean album, Only You.

== Members ==
=== Current ===
- Soohyun (수현)
- Hoon (훈)
- Kiseop (기섭)
- Alexander (알렉산더)
- Eli (일라이)

=== Former ===
- Kibum (기범)
- AJ (에이제이)
- Kevin (케빈)
- Dongho (동호)
- Jun (준)

== Discography ==
Korean albums

- Only One (2010)
- Neverland (2011)
- Collage (2013)

Japanese albums

- A Shared Dream (2012)
- Inside øf Me (2013)
- Memories (2014)
- Action (2015)
- One Shot One Kill (2016)
- U-KISS Solo & Unit ALBUM (2017)
- Link (2018)
- Glory (2018)

== Filmography ==
=== Reality shows ===
- 2009: You Know U-KISS
- 2009: All About U-KISS
- 2010: U-KISS Vampire
- 2010: Chef KISS
- 2013: U-KISSme?
- 2013: Kanzume!! TV Magazine Show
- 2014: Go U-KISS!
- 2014–present: U-KISS no Teatarishidai
- 2019: U-KISS no MassisoU

== Awards and nominations ==
The name of the award ceremony, year presented, category, nominee of the award, and the result of the nomination
| Award ceremony | Year | Category | Nominee / work | Result | Ref. |
|---|---|---|---|---|---|
| Asia Song Festival | 2008 | Asian Rookie Award | U-KISS | Won | |
| Asia Song Festival | 2008 | Influential Asian Artist | U-KISS | Won | |
| Golden Disc Awards | 2010 | Disc Bonsang Award | Only One | Nominated | |
| Golden Disc Awards | 2010 | Popularity Award | Only One | Nominated | |
| Korean Culture Entertainment Awards | 2008 | Best Male Idol Group | U-KISS | Won | |
| Korean Culture Entertainment Awards | 2013 | Best Male Group | U-KISS | Won | |
| Korean Video Daejun Awards | 2011 | Photogenic Artist of the Year | U-KISS | Won | |
| Mnet Asian Music Awards | 2008 | Best New Male Group | "I'm Not A Kid" | Nominated | |
| MTV Europe Music Awards | 2013 | Best Korean Act | U-KISS | Nominated | |
| Seoul Music Awards | 2012 | Disk Bonsang Award | DoraDora | Nominated | |
| Seoul Music Awards | 2012 | Popularity Award | DoraDora | Nominated | |
| SBS MTV Best Of The Best | 2011 | Best Male Music Video | U-KISS | Won | |
| [V] Chinese Top Awards | 2010 | Most Potential Overseas Artist | U-KISS | Won | |
