= NH Media =

South Korean record label

NH Entertainment Media Group (NHemg)
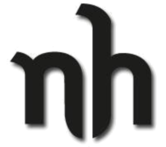
- Native name: 앤에이취미디어; NH미디어 앤에이취이엠쥐
- Company type: Private
- Industry: Entertainment
- Genre: K-pop; Dance; Electropop; R&B
- Founded: 1998
- Founder: Kim Nam-hee
- Headquarters: Seoul, South Korea
- Number of locations: Nonhyeon-dong, Gangnam-gu
- Key people: Kim Nam-hee (CEO)
- Services: Music production artist management
- Owner: Signal Entertainment Group (50%)
- Parent: Signal Entertainment Group
- Subsidiaries: NH&Major1998 (50%); Global H (50%)

NH Media (also known as NHemg) (Korean: NH미디어, NH stands for Nam Hee) is a South Korean entertainment agency founded in 1998 by Kim Nam-hee. Currently, the company mainly operates business under the name of its joint venture Global H Media (글로벌에이치미디어). In May 2016, Signal Entertainment Group acquired 50% of the company.

== Artists ==
- Trendz (2018–2021, 2022–present)

=== Groups ===
- Trendz (2018–2021, 2022–present)

== Joint ventures ==
In 2013, NH Media announced that it had joined forces with Major Entertainment, whose main focus had been on managing actors and actresses. NH Media claimed that the joint agencies would increase their area of expertise. Kim Nam Hee, CEO Of NH Media, officially registered NH&Major1998 as an incorporation.

In 2014, NH Media and Nega Network formed a joint venture called "Global H".
