= Jay Park videography =

Jay Park video discography
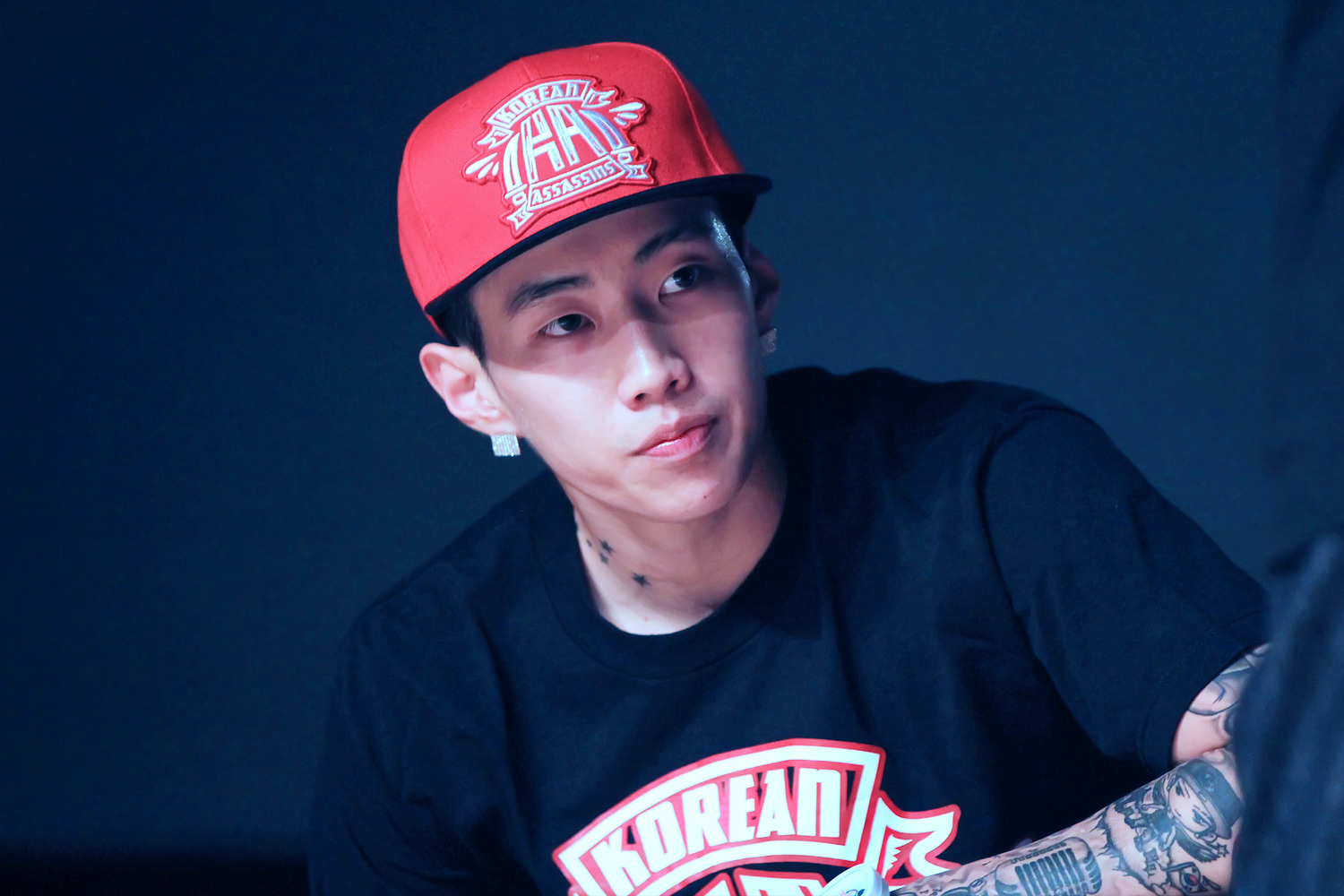
- Park b-boying at R-16 Korea in 2012
- Music videos: 33
- Jay Park TV: 6

The videography of Korean-American rapper Jay Park consists of fifteen music videos, six Jay Park TV webisodes, two films and several appearances on television programs, including Immortal Songs 2 and Saturday Night Live Korea.

== Music videos ==
=== Official music videos ===
Year	Title	Album	Choreographer(s)	YouTube
2010	"믿어줄래" (Nothin' On You) (Full Melody Korean Version)	믿어줄래	-	
2011	"Abandoned" (feat. Dok2)	Take A Deeper Look	Andrew Baterina (SoReal Cru)	
2011	"Abandoned" (Dance Version) (feat. Dok2)	Take A Deeper Look	Andrew Baterina (SoReal Cru)	
2011	"오늘밤" (Tonight) (feat. Kang Min Kyung of Davichi)	Take A Deeper Look	Hawoosin (Prepix)	
2011	"Level 1000" (feat. Dok2)	Take A Deeper Look	-	
2011	"Demon"	-	Andrew Baterina (SoReal Cru)	
2011	"Girlfriend"	New Breed	-	
2011	"별" (Star)	New Breed	Hawoosin (Prepix)	
2012	"Know Your Name" (feat. Dok2)	New Breed	Andrew Baterina (SoReal Cru), Jackie Lautchang (SoReal Cru), Hawooshin (Prepix)	
2012	"Know Your Name" (Acoustic Version Blue)	New Breed (Deluxe Edition)	-	
2012	"New Breed" (Intro)	New Breed	-	
2012	"You Know How We Do" (feat. Dumbfoundead)	Fresh Air: Breathe It (Mixtape)	-	
2013	"Appetizer"	-	-	
2013	"1 Hunnit" (사실이야) (feat. Dok2)	"Joah" (Digital single)	-	
2013	"Joah" (좋아)	"Joah" (Digital single)	-	
2013	"Welcome"	"Joah" (Digital single)	-	
2013	"I Like 2 Party"	I Like 2 Party	Prepix	
2013	"Trill" (feat. Dok2)	-	-	
2014	"Metronome" (메트로놈) (feat. Simon Dominic and Gray)	Evolution	-	
2014	"The Promise" (약속해)	Evolution	-	
2014	"So Good"	Evolution	Lando Wilkins, Prepix, Jay Park	
2014	"NaNa" (나나)	Evolution	-	
2015	"GGG"	Evolution	-	
2015	"On it" (feat. DJ Wegun)	Worldwide	-	
2015	"Sex Trip"	Worldwide	-	
2015	"Mommae" (몸매) (feat. Ugly Duck)	Worldwide	Joony (Prepix), Wassup (Prepix), Jay Park	
2015	"My Last" (feat. Loco and Gray)	Worldwide	-	
2015	"Solo" (feat. Hoody)	Everything You Wanted	Jay Park, Daniel Jerome, Haw, Joony (Prepix), Wassup (Prepix), Rhythmgate (Prepix), Waackxxy (Prepix)	
2015	"You Know" (뻔하잖아) (feat. Okasian)	Worldwide	-	
2015	"BO$$" (feat. Yultron, Loco and Ugly Duck)	Worldwide	-	
2015	"WORLDWIDE X WANT IT (원해)"	Worldwide	-	
2015	"In This B*tch X MY"	Worldwide	-	
2016	"The Truth Is" (사실은)	Everything You Wanted	-	
2016	"All I Wanna Do" (UNOFFICIAL MV)	Everything You Wanted	-	
2016	"우리가 빠지면 Party가 아니지" (with Ugly Duck) (Ain't No Party Like an AOMG Party)	$cene $tealers	-	
2016	"ㅎㄷㄷ Put 'Em Up" (with Ugly Duck)	$cene $tealers	-	
2016	"CITY BREEZE" (with Kirin)	-	-	
2016	"Aquaman" produced by Cha Cha Malone	Everything You Wanted	Lando Wilkins	
2016	"DRIVE" feat. Gray	Everything You Wanted	-	
2016	"Me Like Yuh"	Everything You Wanted	-	
2017	"Raw Sh1t" produced by DJ Wegun	-	-	
2017	"Hulk Hogan" (헐크호건)	-	-	
2017	"YACHT" (with Sik-K) produced by Cha Cha Malone	"Yacht" (Digital Single)	Daniel Jerome (AOM), Haw (Prepix), Honey J (Holy Bang), Mina Myoung (1Milion), Sori Na (1Million)	
2017	"Most Hated" (니가 싫어하는 노래)	"Most Hated" (Digital Single)	-	
2017	"Iffy" (with Sik-k, pH-1)	-	-	
2018	"Forget About Tomorrow"	-	-	
2018	SOJU (feat 2 Chainz)	Ask About Me	-	
2018	FSU (feat GASHI, Rich The Kid)	Ask About Me	-	
2018	"Yacht" (feat Vic Mensa) produced by Cha Cha Malone	Ask About Me	-	
2018	"V"	V	-	
2018	"Sexy 4 Eva"	Ask About Me	-	
2018	"Million"	Ask About Me	-	
2018	"El Tornado" (with Gray)	-	-	
2019	"Dank"	V	-	
2019	"K-Town"	-	-	
2019	"Ben Baller" (feat UNEDUCATED KID, Ghoulavelii & BRADYSTREET)	The Road Less Traveled	-	
2019	"Feng Shui" (produced by Cha Cha Malone)	The Road Less Traveled	-	
2019	"All Day (Flex)" (feat HAON & 염따) (produced by OkayJJack)	Nothing Matters	-	
2019	"Not The Same" (with iLL Chris)	-	-	
2020	"All The Way Up (K)" (Dance Visual)	All The Way Up	-	
2020	"Twist The Plot" (with DJ Wegun)(feat 김심야)	Everybody Sucks	-	
2020	"Gang Remix" (with pH-1), HAON, Sik-K	"Gang Remix" (Digital Single)	-	

=== Other music video appearances ===
Year	Title	Artist	Album	Role	YouTube
2010	"I Want To Cry"	Brave Brothers and Jay Park	The Classic	Featured (Voice only)	
2011	"Maybe One Day"	J.Reyez feat Jay Park	Broken Heart (Mixtape)	Himself	
2011	"입술자국" ("Lip Stains")	5dolls	Charming Five Girls (EP)	Featured	
2011	"너 말이야" ("Your Words")	5dolls	Charming Five Girls (EP)	Featured	
2011	"Manifesto Anthem"	Jay Park and Kwon Ri-sae (for dENiZEN)	-	Himself	
2012	"Jello"	Far East Movement	Jello (Digital single)	Cameo	
2012	"They Love Who?"	Dok2	Love & Life, The Album	Cameo	
2012	"Magic Glasses" ("What I See")	Prepix	Look 2 Listen (Digital single)	Boss	
2012	"XX걸" ("XX Girl")	EZIS	Invincible (EP)	Himself	
2012	"If You Love Me"	NS Yoon-G	If You Love Me (Digital single)	Featured (Voice only)	
2012	"If You Love Me" (M/V Making Film)	NS Yoon-G	If You Love Me (Digital single)	Himself	
2012	"I Like It"	Jay Park (for Korean Food Foundation)	I Like It (Single)	Himself	
2013	"Skillz (Electrue Mix)"	Prepix	Look 2 Listen 3rd (EP)	Himself	
2013	"Around the World" (Lyric video)	Mizz Nina feat. Jay Park	Around the World (Single)	Featured (Voice only)	
2013	"Around the World"	Mizz Nina feat. Jay Park	Around the World (Single)	Himself	
2013	"Unbreakable"	Kim Hyun-joong feat. Jay Park	Round 3 (EP)	Himself	
2013	"위험해" ("Dangerous")	Gray feat. Jay Park	Call Me Gray (EP)	Himself	
2013	"Audition" ("เลือกได้")	Gaia feat. Jay Park	Audition (Digital Single)	Himself	
2014	"Fallin'"	Swings feat. Jay Park	Fallin (Digital Single)	Featured (Voice only)	
2014	"자꾸 생각나'" ("Thinking about you")	Loco feat. Jay Park	LOCOMOTIVE (EP)	Himself	
2015	"Apple"	Gain feat. Jay Park	Hawwah (EP)	Featured (Voice only)	
2015	"Lonely Funk"	Kim Tae-woo feat. Jay Park	T-Road	Featured (Voice only)	
2015	"₩ & ONLY"	Simon D feat. Jay Park	₩ & ONLY (Single)	Himself	
2015	"엉덩이" ("Joa")	Gary feat. Jay Park	2002	Featured (Voice only)	
2016	"생각해" ("Think")	Reddy feat. Jay Park	Think (Digital Single)	Himself	
2016	"Banned In The Motherland"	JoshPan & Dumbfoundead feat. Simon D, Jay Park, G2	-	Featured (Voice only)	
2017	"Boys"	Charli XCX	-	Himself	
2017	"Reborn"	Jay Park, Double K, Boi B (for Hwalmyungsoo)	Reborn (Single)	Himself	
2018	"Run It"	Jay Park, Woo Won-jae, Jessi (for Nike)	-	Himself	
2019	"Engine"	Jay Park, Woo Won Jae (for Levi Jeans)	-	Himself	
2020	"꽃" ("flower")	Code Kunst feat Jay Park, Woo Won Jae, Giriboy	People	Himself	
2021	"MM"	sokodomo feat. Jay Park (prod.sesåme)	...---... (S.O.S)(EP)	Himself	

== Performances ==
=== Immortal Songs 2 ===
Aired	Song	Original artist	Notes
August 6, 2011	Candy	H.O.T.	With H.O.T. leader, Moon Hee-jun.
August 13, 2011	애모 (Aemo/Affection)	김수희 (Kim Soo-hee)	
August 20, 2011	말해줘 (Tell Me)	지누션 (Jinusean)	With Kim Soo-ro, Jang Hyuk, and Solbi.
August 27, 2011	기분 좋은 날 (Feel Good Day)	김완선 (Kim Wan-Sun)	
September 3, 2011	나를 돌아봐 (Turn Around And Look At Me)	듀스 (Deux)	
September 10, 2011	그대여 변치마오 (Dear, Do Not Change)	남진 (Nam Jin)	
November 19, 2011	그대여 변치마오 (Dear, Do Not Change)	남진 (Nam Jin)	R&B remix. King of Kings special.
February 25, 2012	널 사랑하겠어 (I Choose To Love You)	동물원 (Dong Mul-won)	
March 3, 2012	빈잔 (Empty Glass)	남진 (Nam Jin)	
March 10, 2012	잠못드는 밤 비는 내리고 (Sleepless Rainy Night)	김건모 (Kim Gun-mo)	
March 31, 2012	사랑이란 두 글자 (Love Is A Two Letter Word)	패티김 (Patti Kim)	
April 7, 2012	아리송해 (Ambiguous)	이은하 (Lee Eun-ha)	
March 14, 2012	신라의달밤 (Moonlight In Silla)	현인 (Hyeon In)	
October 27, 2012	빗속의 여인 (The Woman in Rain)	신중현 (Shin Jung-hyeon)	King of Kings special.
April 20, 2013	남자는 배 여자는 항구 (Man is a Ship, Woman is a Harbour)	한국어 (Sim Soo-bong)	
April 27, 2013	붉은 노을 (Sunset Glow)	이문세 (Lee Moon-sae)	With Crush.
May 11, 2013	매일 그대와 (Every Day With You)	들국화 (Deulgukhwa)	100th episode special.

== YouTube ==
Park first created his own YouTube channel on March 15, 2010, called "jayparkaom", posting his cover of "Nothin' on You" with his own rap and lyrics. The video went viral and garnered two million views in less than one day. Park continued to use YouTube to reach out to his fans, and uploaded more videos where he covered a variety of songs and played around with his friends from Art of Movement (AOM). Park describes himself as a "huge YouTube freak", and that he enjoys watching covers, comedy, battles, singing, dancing, and his friends Ryan Higa, Kevjumba, and Traphik.

Park also collaborated with other rappers and singers famous for their YouTube following, such as Dumbfoundead and Clara Chung on the track "Clouds". Shortly after Park performed at ISA 2010 in Los Angeles alongside many YouTube celebrities, Park featured in a highly anticipated short skit with Ryan Higa and Phil Wang, titled "Word of the Day - Bromance", which quickly went viral and has reached nearly thirteen million views as of December 2012. Park continued to collaborate and perform with fellow YouTuber's, most notably at ISA LA concert in 2010 and 2011.

Before the release of his EP, Take A Deeper Look, Park's original YouTube channel was unexpectedly removed. Park quickly created a new channel, "jaybumaom0425", reassuring fans not to worry. Park manages his own YouTube channel and uploads all the content himself; a situation which is unheard of in the K-pop industry. Park has stated that he likes to upload content that comes straight from him, and how he reads the comments and replies he gets from fans. Park also continues to upload songs and raps, b-boy and dance practice, acrobatics, choreography, news and updates for his fans, and other humorous clips.

While Park was in Los Angeles as a part of his 2012 APAHM tour, Park collaborated with AJ Rafael on a live remix of "Here All Alone, Pt. 3", an original song by AJ Rafael, and was filmed and uploaded by Knocksteady on June 4, 2012. Park also collaborated on a dance video of Love Faces by Trey Songz, co-starring and choreographed by Di "Moon" Zhang from I.aM.mE dance crew, champions of the sixth season of America's Best Dance Crew. While in Malaysia in May, Park collaborated with Dennis Yin of Elecoldxhot on a choreographed dance video of "Tonight" by John Legend.

On June 27, 2012, Park featured in YOMYOMF Network's comedy webseries with Kevjumba, in a video titled "KevJumba Takes on Zombies w/ Jay Park", where Kevjumba and Park go head-to-head in a series of paintball challenges against zombies and each other. On October 29, Park was featured in a YouTube skit by David So, titled "The Last Resort", along with Dumbfoundead. The skit is a parody of Wong Fu Productions's viral short film, "The Last". Park plays an emotional, but comedic, ex-boyfriend of the female lead, Julie Zhan. His scene was filmed at the last-minute due to a flying visit to Los Angeles.

=== Jay Park TV ===
https://www.youtube.com/watch?v=PeIq01GhB70&playnext=1&list=PL8DDC9427D331BC26&feature=results_video Jay Park TV

In July 2012, Park began to release regular webisodes of Jay Park TV through his YouTube channel, filmed and edited by Hep, Park's friend and fellow Art of Movement member. The web series shows Park's daily life with his friends, behind-the-scenes of concerts and filming, and the fun and games that he gets up to. Each episode starts with a series of comedic photos of Park or his friends, along with a logo and introduction music made by Cha Cha, a producer and member of AOM. Park has been credited by viewers for being down-to-earth and natural, and also including Korean subtitles for his fans in Korea, as the main language spoken in the episodes is English.

The 1st episode, released on July 23, 2012, shows Park hanging out with his friends from AOM while in Korea. Park also included his personal footage recorded on his iPhone, which shows Park on stage at "Highlight Festival 2012" concert with Far East Movement. Park also showed his comedic nature while posing for photos outside a giant poster of his face at a Googims store. The episode also shows Park behind-the-scenes of filming a TV advert for Williamsburg, and the long hours involved. At the end of the episode, Park is shown with Dok2, The Quiett, KrNfx, AOM, and Park's b-boy friends at R-16 Korea before their performances on stage. Finally, Park sings in an impromptu performance of Billie Jean by Michael Jackson on the streets at night, outside a restaurant, beatboxed by KrNfx.

In the 2nd episode, released two weeks after the first on August 5, 2012, starts by showing Park, his friends, and his dancers, on the way to Malaysia for MTV World Stage Live in Malaysia 2012. Park also included footage of his stage rehearsal for the concert, and him jokingly posing behind Kara when they were being interviewed. Park included a clip of audio problems he was having while performing at the W Hotel in Seoul, which he countered by finishing his song "Girlfriend" by singing a capella. Later, Park is shown joking around with his friends, and goes on to explain to the camera how tired he is due to lack of sleep, but has to go on to b-boy battle at R-16 Korea the same day. At the end of the episode, Park is seen mimicking Internet celebrity Antoine Dodson's Bed Intruder Song by The Gregory Brothers, while wearing a makeshift bandana.

The 3rd episode, released August 26, 2012, is narrated throughout by Park. The episode starts with the members of Art of Movement travelling by car in the early hours of the morning, with Park passed out, much to the amusement of his friends, who take the opportunity to make sexually-suggestive jokes using Park's unconscious body. The episode goes on to show dance and stage rehearsals for Park's "New Breed Asia Tour in Seoul" concert along with Park's friends from the Prepix dance crew. Park also introduces Ailee, who came to watch the concert, backstage in the dressing room before the start of the concert. The episode goes on to show Park performing at a club, hanging out and playing games with his friends and fellow b-boys.

After a 3-month hiatus, the 4th episode was released on December 3, 2012. Park gives viewers an update of the last few months, mentioning his concerts in Australia, time spent at home in Seattle, b-boy battles he attended, and gives shout-outs to Ben Baller and Steven Jo. Park goes on to show behind the scenes clips of his time filming Saturday Night Live Korea skits and a parody music video. Park becomes the cameraman for part of this episode as he films Hep, member of Art of Movement and his videographer, teasing his clothing and making reference to "Low" by Flo Rida, and locking him in a cupboard. The episode goes on to show Park rapping and singing during recording sessions, and practising b-boying, flipping, and tumbling. Park also continues the tradition of introducing video footage from his iPhone, including an appearance by Kyuhyun from Super Junior who lip-syncs to Park's song "Abandoned".

On March 25, 2013, Park released the 5th episode, starting in Singapore where Park had a showcase in January, 2013. Park takes fans behind the scenes during press conferences, interviews, and the concert. Park's brother, Jehan, and members of dance team, Prepix, are featured heavily in this episode. Park is seen dancing and joking with his friends before his Singapore showcase. Footage of Park performing is also included, as well a Park opening and drinking a bottle of champagne given to him by fans after the show. Next in the episode, Park is at a photoshoot for Men's Health Korea Magazine, where Park is mostly shirtless, to the delight of fans. Park also makes reference to Justin Timberlake's 2013 single, "Suit & Tie", as Park is dressed in a suit and tie for the next park of the photoshoot. The next scene is at the "Illionaire 2nd Anniversary Concert", where Park is performing with friends Dok2, The Quiett, and Beenzino. Park also shows behind-the-scenes footage of filming the music video for this free 2013 song, "Appetizer".

On June 18, 2013, the 6th episode of Jay Park TV was released.

On July 30, 2013, the 7th and final episode of Jay Park TV was released.

== Filmography ==
=== Film ===
Year	Title	Role	Notes
2010	Hype Nation 3D	Darkness	
2011	Mr. Idol	Jio	
2024	K-Pops!	Himself	Cameo

=== Television ===
Year	Title	Notes
2007	Mnet Hot Blood Men	Pre-debut days.
2008	MBC Idol Show	Season 3 featuring 2PM.
2008	SBS Star King	Regular cast member.
2009	KBS2 Sang Sang Plus	Featuring GOD & 2PM's Jaebeom, Nichkhun & Taecyeon.
2009	MBC Introducing a Star's Friend	Regular cast member.
2009	KBS2 I Have An Uncle	Aired on September 8, September 15, and September 22, Episode 16 - 18 featuring 2PM Jaebeom & Chansung.
2009	Mnet Wild Bunny	Seven episodes featuring 2PM, with the eighth episode unaired.
2009	MBC Nodaji	Regular cast member and host.
2009	KBS Star Golden Bell	Episode: 234, 239 (Aired on June 6), 243
2011	tvN Dream Special	Aired on February 29 and February 26.
2011	KBS Guerilla Date	Aired on March 3 in lead up to Take A Deeper Look mini-album release.
2011	Y-Star News	Interview with Park, and behind the scenes of filming for his music video for "Tonight", on March 19.
2011	MBC Dramatic	First episode aired on April 26.
2011	KBS Lee So-ra's Second Proposal	Aired on May 18, with Park performing the full version of his 6 Foot 7 Foot remix live for the first time.
2011	KBS Immortal Songs 2	Was a regular cast member from August 6 to September 10 and rejoined for a single special episode on November 19 titled "King of Kings".
2011	KBS Guerilla Date	Joining fellow cast members of movie, Mr. Idol.
2011	KBS Guerilla Date	Aired on August 13 with fellow Immortal Songs 2 cast members Huh Gak and Hyorin.
2011	KBS Hello Baby	Episode for September 9 of SISTAR's and Leeteuk's Hello Baby, where Park makes cameo appearances backstage at Immortal Songs 2 filming.
2011	KBS Happy Together	Aired on October 13 alongside fellow Mr. Idol cast members.
2011	tvN Taxi	Aired on November 11, filmed before the 2011 Style Icon Awards, where Park was performing.
2011	KBS Hello	Aired on November 28.
2012	KBS Gag Concert	Played a cameo role as a dancing ninja on February 2.
2012	Y-Star Bus Star	Aired on February 24.
2012	KBS Immortal Songs 2	Rejoined as a regular cast member from February 25 to April 14. Returned for a special episode which aired October 27.
2012	KBS Hello	Aired on February 27.
2012	MBC Weekly Idol	Aired on March 3.
2012	KBS Guerilla Date	Aired on March 10.
2012	JTBC Made in U	Park appears as a cameo, as the best couple from reality show, Made in U, are taken backstage at Park's "New Breed Live in Seoul" concert on the episode for March 10.
2012	Mnet Yoon Do Hyun's MUST	Park appears as a guest for the episode for March 18. Park also performs songs from his New Breed album, covers Usher's "U Got It Bad", and performs with his b-boy crew, Art of Movement (AOM).
2012	MBC Vampire Idol	Played the role of "J", a vampire from America in search of the sweetest human blood, for Episode 77, which aired on March 28.
2012	KBS Lee So-ra's Second Proposal	Aired on March 28 featuring an interview with Park, and performances of "Girlfriend" and "Know Your Name".
2012	Mnet The Beatle Code 2	Aired March 29, alongside Nine Muses and Park Eunji.
2012	SBS You & I	A talk show hosted by Lee Hyori and Jung Jae-hyung where Park also performed songs from his New Breed album. Aired on April 1.
2012	MBC Music & Lyrics	Episode 3, which aired in four parts from April 14 to May 5, with actress Lee Si-young, where they were tasked to create a song for upcoming girl group, Tiny-G.
2012	MBC M Show Champion	Park was interviewed on the show with Lee Si-young as a part of Music & Lyrics filming, watching Tiny-G perform "Polaris".
2012	KBS Dream Team 2	Park was a part of the "Asia Stars" team. Aired on May 6.
2012	MBC Come To Play	A fixed panel member on the "True Man Show", along with Yoo Jae-suk, Eun Ji-won, Kwon Oh-joong, Kim Won-hee, and Kim Eung-soo. Aired on a weekly schedule from September 10 to December 24.
2012	tvN Saturday Night Live Korea	Hosted the December 1 broadcast, featuring in many skits and in a special parody music video of "Love The Way You Lie" titled "Because I'm a Man".
2012	JTBC Patti Kim Show	A tribute show to famous pop singer Patti Kim, aired December 23.
2012	MBC M Haha's 19TV Mutiny	Hosted by singer and entertainer Haha, aired December 24.
2013	tvN Saturday Night Live Korea	Rejoined SNL as a fixed cast member of season 4 which started airing weekly on February 23.
2013	tvN Taxi	Aired on April 8. Park featured alongside fellow Saturday Night Live Korea cast member Kim Seul-gi.
2013	Mnet Wide Open Studio	Park and Seo In-guk featured on the show before their respective comebacks on M! Countdown on April 11.
2013	KBS Dream Team 2	Aired on May 19. Park was on the show alongside idol groups Secret and Rainbow.
2013	MBC Radio Star	Aired on July 19.
2013	SBS Hwasin: Controller of the Heart	Aired on April 16. Appeared as a guest alongside Kim Young-ok, Kim Soo-mi, JK Kim Dong-wook, Im Si-wan, Choi Pil-lip
2014	tvN Saturday Night Live Korea	Appeared as a fixed cast member of season 5
2014	Mnet 4 Things Show:Season 1	An 18 episode documentary that showcased a star from four different perspectives through interviews with the star and 3 people around him. Park appeared on the 1st two episodes.
2015	tvN Saturday Night Live Korea	A fixed cast member of season 6
2015	MBC King of Mask Singer	Appeared as a contestant on Episode 41 & 42 as Cold City Monkey
2015	Mnet Show Me the Money 4	Appeared as a Judge/Producer along with fellow label member Loco as Team AOMG
2015	iQiyi Ding Ge Lon Dong Qiang	A variety show in which Chinese and foreign stars participate to combine opera culture and entertainment. Regular cast member with Jang Hyuk, Kim Jong-kook
2016	SBS The Collaboration	Appeared as a regular cast member
2016	jTBC Let's Eat Dinner Together	Appeared as a guest on Episode 96 with Simon Dominic
2017	tvN Buzzer Beat	Celebrity basketball players form teams and compete with each other led by former professional basketball players as their coaches. Was a regular cast member. Position Team H guard
2017	Mnet Show Me the Money 6	Appeared as a Judge/Producer along with Dok2
2018	SBS Baek Jong-won's Alley Restaurant	Made a special appearance as customers on Episode 75 along with Haon
2019	MBN Sign Here	A survival audition program between MBN in collaboration with AOMG to find the next artist to enter AOMG. Park appeared as a Judge along with fellow labelmates Simon Dominic, Gray, Code Kunst and Woo Won-jae
2019	SBS Delicious Rendezvous	Appeared in the Pilot Episode as well as Episodes 13–15, 28-29
2021	SBS Delicious Rendezvous	Appeared on Episode 63 & 64 with Lee Na-eun(April
2021	Mnet High School Rapper (season 4)	Appeared as a mentor along with fellow H1gher labelmates Woogie and pH-1
2023	JTBC Peak Time	Appeared as a judge

== Radio ==
Date	Radio Show	Notes
May 6, 2011	Danny's Music Show	
May 9, 2011	Super Junior's Kiss the Radio	
May 12, 2011	Younha's Starry Night	
May 20, 2011	Ock Joo-hyun's Music Square	With Lim Jeong Hee.
August 26, 2011	Danny's Music Show	
September 1, 2011	Boom's Young Street	With Dynamic Duo.
November 10, 2011	Younha's Starry Night	
November 18, 2011	Choi Hwa Jung's Power Time	With Kim Johan.
November 24, 2011	SimSimTaPa	
December 1, 2011	Cultwo Show	
February 13, 2012	Super Junior's Kiss the Radio	
February 13, 2012	TenTen Radio	With Brian Joo.
March 4, 2012	Choi Hwa Jung's Power Time	With Spica.
March 5, 2012	Younha's Starry Night	
March 7, 2012	Hong Jin-kyung's Two O'Clock	With John Park.
March 13, 2012	Hongsi's Radio	With John Park.
March 15, 2012	Cultwo Show	With John Park and Spica.
April 24, 2013	Park So-hyun's Love Game	
April 26, 2013	Boom's Young Street	With Lyn.
May 2, 2013	Cultwo Show	With D-Unit.
May 4, 2013	Super Junior's Kiss the Radio	
May 6, 2013	Jung Sun-hee's Like A Tonight	
May 15, 2013	SimSimTaPa	
September 2014	Tablo's Dreaming Radio	With Simon D and Gray
September 2014	Blue Night Radio	With DJ Jonghyun

== See also ==
- Jay Park discography
- Saturday Night Live Korea
- Nigahiga
- Wong Fu Productions
