= Jay Park discography =

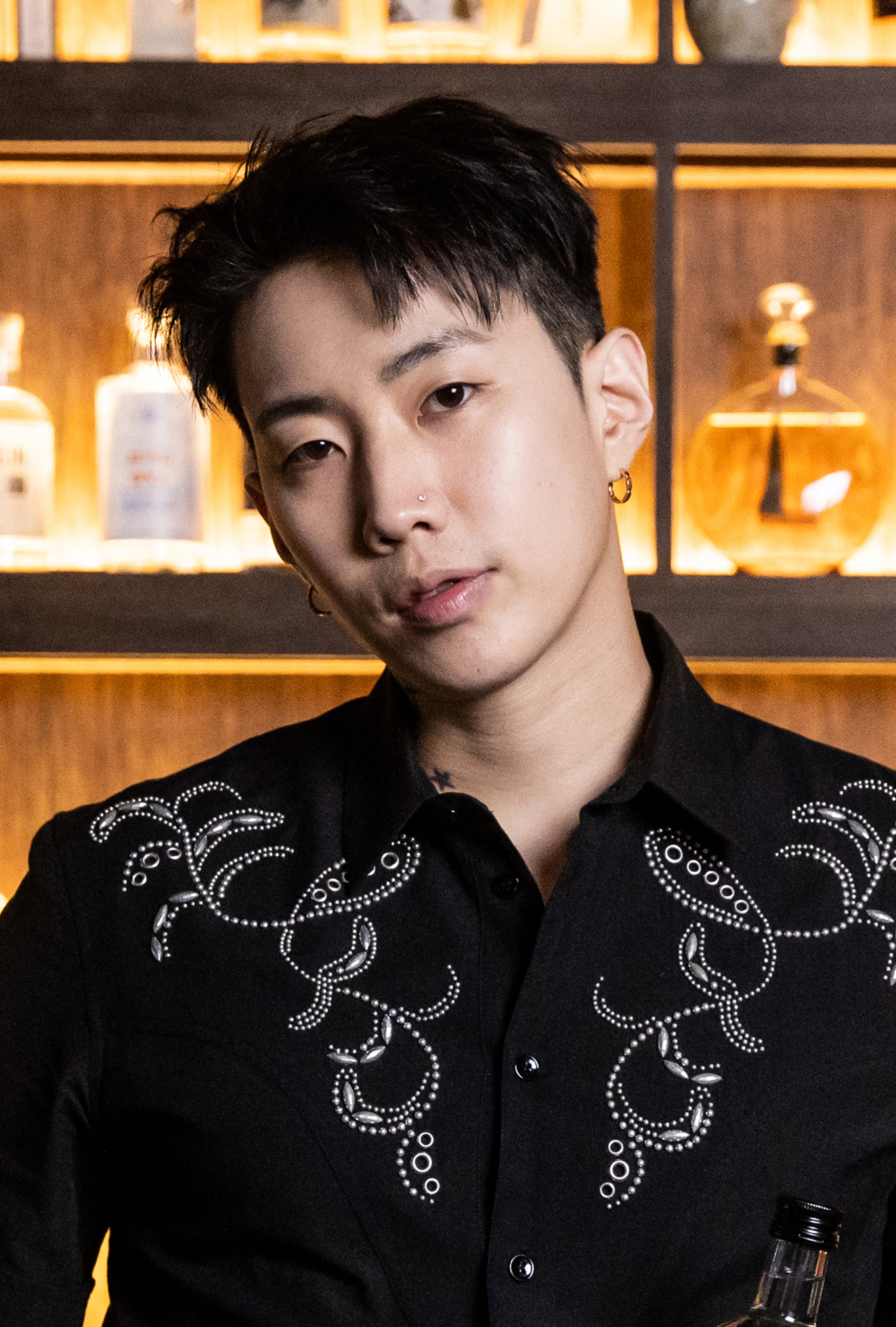
- Park in 2022
- Studio albums: 6
- Extended plays: 8
- Soundtrack albums: 5
- Singles: 27
- Music videos: 35
- Promotional singles: 4
- Mixtapes: 1

The discography of Korean-American rapper and singer-songwriter Jay Park consists of six studio albums, eight extended plays, twenty-seven singles, and more. Following Park's departure from 2PM, he uploaded a cover of B.o.B.'s "Nothin' on You" onto his YouTube account, with rap and lyrics written by himself. This led Warner Music Korea to release his first EP, Count on Me. The EP peaked at number one on the Gaon Chart.

In 2011, Park released his first Korean mini-album Take a Deeper Look, consisting of seven songs, mainly written and composed by himself. In the United States, the album debuted at number three on the Billboard World Albums chart and at number twenty six on the Billboard Heatseekers Albums chart. The mini-album sold over 50,000 copies in 5 days after its release on April 27, 2012. On January 11, 2012, Park received the Disk Bonsang for Take a Deeper Look on the first day of the 26th Golden Disc Awards, and was the only solo artist to receive a bonsang.

In 2012, Park released his first full-length Korean album New Breed, which sold over 100,000 copies in a month. The album debuted at number four on the Billboard World Albums chart and at number sixteen on the Billboard Heatseekers Albums chart. The album peaked at number one on the Gaon Chart. Park released an English mixtape, Fresh Air: Breathe It, in a run up to his APAHM tour in the USA. The mixtape became the first mixtape by an Asian artist to have gold status on DatPiff by surpassing 100,000 downloads.

Early in 2013, Park released a free-download English rap track, "Appetizer", produced by Cha Cha Malone, in addition to a music video on his YouTube channel. In April 2013, Park released a digital single entitled "Joah", a rap track featuring Dok2. Park's fourth album Everything You Wanted, released in 2016, charted at number three on Billboard's World Albums chart.

== Albums ==
=== Studio albums ===
Title	Album details	Peak chart positions			Sales
Title	Album details	KOR	US Heat	US World	Sales
New Breed	Released: February 7, 2012; Labels: SidusHQ, Universal Music; Formats: CD, digital download, streaming	1	16	4	KOR: 76,829
Evolution	Released: September 1, 2014; Labels: SidusHQ, AOMG; Formats: CD, digital download, streaming	3	—	5	KOR: 56,482
Worldwide	Released: November 5, 2015; Labels: AOMG, CJ E&M; Formats: CD, digital download, streaming	3	—	5	KOR: 32,776
Everything You Wanted	Released: October 20, 2016; Labels: AOMG, CJ E&M; Formats: CD, digital download, streaming	5	—	3	KOR: 23,292
The Road Less Traveled	Released: June 7, 2019; Labels: AOMG, CJ E&M; Formats: CD, digital download, streaming	11	—	—	KOR: 6,715
The One You Wanted	Released: October 8, 2024; Labels: More Vision; Formats: CD, digital download, streaming	9	—	—	KOR: 24,481

=== Mixtapes ===
Title	Details	Peak chart positions	Sales
Title	Details	KOR	Sales
Fresh Air: Breathe It	Released: May 16, 2012; Format: Digital download, streaming	—	—
4shoboiz Vol. 2: 4shoville (with Lngshot)	Released: May 18, 2026; Labels: More Vision; Formats: Digital download, streaming	7	KOR: 49,300

== Extended plays ==
Title	Album details	Peak chart positions			Sales
Title	Album details	KOR	US Heat	US World	Sales
Count on Me	Released: July 13, 2010; Labels: Vitamin Entertainment, Warner; Formats: CD, digital download	1	—	—	KOR: 41,316
Take a Deeper Look	Released: April 27, 2011; Labels: SidusHQ, Yedang Company; Formats: CD, digital download	—	26	3	KOR: 51,452
New Breed Part 1	Released: December 28, 2011; Labels: SidusHQ, Universal Music; Format: Digital download	—	45	1	
Scene Stealers (with Ugly Duck)	Released: July 13, 2016; Labels: AOMG, CJ E&M; Formats: CD, digital download	35	—	8	KOR: 500
Ask Bout Me	Released: July 20, 2018; Labels: Roc Nation, AOMG; Format: Digital download	—	—	—	
Nothing Matters	Released: July 2, 2019; Labels: AOMG, CJ E&M; Format: Digital download	—	—	—	
On Fire (with Yultron)	Released: August 30, 2019; Label: H1ghr Music; Format: Digital download	—	—	—	
This Wasn't Supposed to Happen (with Hit-Boy)	Released: November 15, 2019; Labels: Roc Nation, AOMG; Format: Digital download	—	—	—	

== Singles ==
=== As lead artist ===
List of singles as lead artist, with selected chart positions and certifications, showing year released and album name
Title	Year	Peak chart positions			Sales	Album
Title	Year	KOR	KOR Hot	US World	Sales	Album
"Count on Me (Nothin' on You)" (믿어줄래) (Full Melody Korean Version)	2010	4	*	—		Count on Me
"Speechless" (featuring Cha Cha Malone)	2010	—	*	—		Non-album single
"Bestie" (베스티)	2010	—	*	—		Take a Deeper Look
"Abandoned" (featuring Dok2)	2011	6	*	2	KOR: 630,268	Take a Deeper Look
"Tonight" (오늘밤) (featuring Kang Min Kyung Of Davichi)	2011	33	*	21		Take a Deeper Look
"Demon"	2011	15	20	—	KOR: 375,649	Non-album single
"Girlfriend"	2011	28	23	4	KOR: 431,446	New Breed
"Star" (별)	2011	17	11	23	KOR: 474,995	New Breed
"Know Your Name" (featuring Dok2)	2012	14	9	3	KOR: 868,187	New Breed
"Happy Ending" (해피엔딩)	2012	70	—	—	KOR: 92,463	Rooftop Prince
"Appetizer"	2013	—	—	—		Non-album single
"Joah"	2013	17	—	4	KOR: 693,065	Evolution
"I Like 2 Party"	2013	17	—	16	KOR: 158,952	Evolution
"Metronome" (featuring Simon Dominic and Gray)	2014	28	7	7	KOR: 130,337	Evolution
"Promise"	2014	48	*	—	KOR: 40,288	Evolution
"So Good" (featuring Common Ground)	2014	9	*	—	KOR: 101,095	Evolution
"On It + BO$$" (with Lil Boi and Loco )	2015	11	*	—	KOR: 381,083	Show Me The Money 4
"Sex Trip"	2015	—	*	—		₩orld ₩ide
"Mommae" (featuring Ugly Duck)	2015	12	*	12	KOR: 657,067	₩orld ₩ide
"My Last" (featuring Loco and Gray)	2015	30	*	19	KOR: 249,588	₩orld ₩ide
"Solo" (featuring Hoody)	2015	16	*	11	KOR: 340,675	₩orld ₩ide
"You Know" (featuring Okasian)	2015	44	*	9	KOR: 75,679	₩orld ₩ide
"All I Wanna Do"	2016	—	*	—		Everything You Wanted
"The Truth Is" (사실은)	2016	31	*	—	KOR: 146,443	Everything You Wanted
"Ain't No Party Like an AOMG Party" (with Ugly Duck)	2016	102	*	24	KOR: 32,799	Scene Stealers
"Aquaman"	2016	134	*	—	KOR: 16,700	Everything You Wanted
"Me Like Yuh (K)" (featuring Hoody)	2016	46	*	—	KOR: 95,205	Everything You Wanted
"Drive" (featuring Gray)	2016	59	*	8	KOR: 61,698	Everything You Wanted
"All I Wanna Do (K)" (featuring Hoody and Loco)	2016	11	*	9	KOR: 1,253,804	Everything You Wanted
"Stay with Me" (곁에 있어주길)	2016	54	*	—	KOR: 63,926	Everything You Wanted
"Love My Life" (featuring pH-1)	2017	92	*	—	KOR: 18,560	Non-album singles
"Most Hated" (Jay Park & Dok2)	2017	—	*	—		Non-album singles
"Yacht (K)" (featuring Sik-K)	2017	21	*	18	KOR: 97,019	Non-album singles
"Reborn" (featuring Double K and Boi B)	2017	—	—	—		Non-album singles
"Upside Down" (with Simon Dominic, Loco and Gray)	2018	89	—	—		Non-album singles
"V"	2018	69	—	—		Non-album singles
"119 Remix" (Note: With: Simon Dominic, Loco, Ugly Duck, Woo, Sik-K, Woodie Gochild, Haon, Gaeko, Bewhy, Paloalto, G2, Reddy, Sway D, Owen Ovadoz, The Quiett, Changmo, Hash Swan, Keem Hyo-eun, Deepflow, Nucksal, Odee, Rocky L, EK, Los, Chaboom, Swings, Giriboy, No:el, Jvcki Wai, Justhis, Han Yohan, Yunhway, Jhnovr, Coogie, Punchnello, Penomeco, Dbo, Hangzoo, Geegooin, Boi B, Ja Mezz, Dayday, Junoflo, Flowsik, Killagramz, Yumdda, Uneducated Kid, MyunDo, TakeOne, and Gray)	2018	—	—	—		Non-album singles
"All Day (Flex)" (featuring Haon and Yumdda)	2019	136	—	—		Nothing Matters
"Gang Official Remix" (with Sik-K, pH-1 and Haon)	2020	4	—	—		Non-album singles
"Automatic Remix" (Note: With: Chancellor, Lee Hi, Bibi, Jamie, Moon, Bumkey, Samuel Seo, Suran, Babylon, Hoody, Sumin, MRSHLL, Ann One, Elo, twlv, oceanfromtheblue, Jiselle, Sole, Thama, K.vsh, Jinbo, Jerd, Soovi, B.E.D., Xydo, Owell Mood, and None)	2020	—	—	—		Non-album singles
"To Life"	2022	147	—	—		Non-album singles
"Ganadara" (featuring IU)	2022	1	1	10		Non-album singles
"Need to Know"	2022	137	*	—		Non-album singles
"Yesterday"	2023	82	*	—		Non-album singles
"Love Is Ugly" (featuring Hwasa)	2023	156	*	—		Non-album singles
"Sunday Night Drive"	2023	172	*	—		Non-album singles
"Candy" (featuring Zion.T)	2023	87	*	—		Non-album singles
"Taxi Blurr" (featuring Natty of Kiss of Life)	2024	199	*	—		Non-album singles
"McNasty"	2024	— (Note: "McNasty" did not enter the Circle Digital Chart, but debuted and peaked at number 54 on the component Download Chart)	*	—		Non-album singles
"Xtra McNasty" (featuring Jessi, Awich, Milli, Ramengvrl, Lil Cherry, Mirani, Maliibu Miitch, and Camo)	2024	— (Note: "Xtra McNasty" did not enter the Circle Digital Chart, but debuted and peaked at number 76 on the component Download Chart)	*	—		Non-album singles
"Keep It Sexy (MOMMAE 2)" (featuring Jeon Somi)	2025	—	*	—		Non-album singles
"Flirty" (with Dayoung)	2026	—	*	—		Non-album singles
"—" denotes releases that did not chart or were not released in that region. "*" denotes the chart did not exist at that time.

=== Promotional singles ===
Title	Year	Company
"커피를 마시며" ("While Drinking Coffee")	2011	Caffe Bene
"Manifesto Anthem" (with 권리세)	2011	dENiZEN
"I Like It"	2012	Korean Food Foundation
"Five Me Five"	2015	Mini Yo Man

=== As a featured artist ===
Title	Year	Peak chart positions	Sales	Album
Title	Year	KOR	Sales	Album
"正(정)" (Ye-eun (Wonder Girls) featuring Jay Park & Shorty Jang-goon)	2007	*	—N/a	Conspiracy in the Court OST
"To Luv ..." (V.O.S featuring Jay Park)	2009	*	—N/a	Routine Free
"Clouds" (Dumbfoundead featuring Jay Park & Clara C)	2010	—	—N/a	Clouds
"Nothin' on You" (B.o.B featuring Jay Park)	2010	—	—N/a	B.o.B Presents: The Adventures of Bobby Ray
"Doin' Good" (Remix) (Dok2 & Rado featuring Jay Park)	2010	—	—N/a	It's We (EP)
"울고 싶단 말야" (I Want To Cry) (Brave Brothers and Jay Park)	2010	—	—N/a	The Classic
"Catch Me If You Can" (Remix) (Decipher featuring J.Reyez, Dumbfoundead, Flowsik, Chan, Johnnyphlo, Jay Park, Ailee)	2010	—	—N/a	Catch Me If You Can (Remix)
"I'm Ready" (Decipher featuring Dumbfoundead & Jay Park)	2011	—	—N/a	The Effect
"힙합" (Anthem version) (Dok2 & Double K featuring Beenzino, B-Free, Bizzy, Jay Park, Paloalto, Swings, The Quiett & Yankie)	2011	—	—N/a	Flow 2 Flow (EP)
"Maybe One Day" (J.Reyez featuring Jay Park)	2011	—	—N/a	Maybe One Day
"I'll Be There" (Swings featuring Jay Park)	2011	—	—N/a	I'll Be There
"My Love" (Dok2 featuring Jay Park)	2011	—	—N/a	Hustle Real Hard
"Single Life" (Cha Cha Malone featuring Jay Park)	2011	—	—N/a	Single Life
"Summer Dream" (Jay Park, Ji Hyun Woo, Jang Seo Won, Kim Randy)	2011	—	—N/a	Mr Idol OST
"Mr. Lonely Part 1" (The Quiett featuring Jay Park)	2011	—	—N/a	Stormy Friday
"Can't Stop" (Brian Joo featuring Jay Park & Beenzino)	2012	—	—N/a	ReBorn Part 1
"Can't Stop" (English version) (Brian Joo featuring Jay Park & Dumbfoundead)	2012	—	—N/a	ReBorn Part 1
"처음 있는 일" Then I Saw You (Korean Version) (Prepix featuring Jay Park)	2012	—	—N/a	Look To Listen
"Then I Saw You" (Prepix featuring Jay Park)	2012	—	—N/a	Look To Listen
"Green Light" (G.NA featuring Jay Park)	2012	58	KOR: 57,964	Bloom
"Driver" (Younha featuring Jay Park)	2012	—	—N/a	Supersonic
"XX걸" (XX Girl) (EZIS featuring Jay Park)	2012	—	—N/a	Invincible
"Congratulations" (Primary featuring Dynamic Duo and Jay Park)	2012	—	—N/a	Primary and the Messengers
"If You Love Me" (NS Yoon-G featuring Jay Park)	2012	16	KOR: 596,991	If You Love Me
"Doin' Great" (Dok2 featuring Jay Park)	2013	—	—N/a	South Korean Rapstar Mixtape
"Gettin' Rich" (The Quiett featuring Jay Park and Dok2)	2013	—	—N/a	Ambitiqn
"Around the World" (Mizz Nina featuring Jay Park)	2013	—	—N/a	Around the World
"발칙한 녀 (Rude Girl)" (Kim Seul-gi featuring Jay Park)	2013	—	—N/a	She Is Wow OST
"Zonin" (Phe featuring Jay Park)	2013	—	—N/a	December's Bachelor
"Unbreakable" (Kim Hyun-joong featuring Jay Park)	2013	90	KOR: 19,330	Round 3
"Dangerous" (Gray featuring Jay Park)	2013	67	KOR: 57,035	Call Me Gray
"Audition" (Gaia featuring Jay Park)	2013	—	—N/a	Audition
"Fallin'" (Swings featuring Jay Park)	2014	23	KOR: 96,120	Fallin
"Don't Front" (Illionaire Records featuring Jay Park)	2014	—	—N/a	11:11
"Give It To Me" (Crush featuring Jay Park and Simon Dominic)	2014	65	KOR: 64,876	Crush On You
"Thinking About You" (Loco featuring Jay Park)	2014	—	—N/a	Locomotive
"Life is Good" (Epik High featuring Jay Park)	2014	13	KOR: 234,796	Shoebox
"Apple" (Gain featuring Jay Park)	2015	2	KOR: 625,263	Hawwah
"Lonely Funk" (Kim Tae-woo featuring Jay Park)	2015	85	KOR: 24,377	T-Road
"Awesome" (Loco featuring Jay Park & Gray)	2015	17	KOR: 268,987	Non-album single
"₩ & ONLY" (Simon D featuring Jay Park)	2015	32	KOR: 115,164	₩ & ONLY
"엉덩이" (Butt) (Gary featuring Jay Park)	2015	8	KOR: 249,909	2002
"화이트" (WHITE) (Davichi featuring Jay Park)	2015	7	KOR: 440,315	D-Make
"Top of the Top" (VASCO featuring Jay Park)	2015	—	—N/a	Madmax
"Think" (Reddy featuring Jay Park)	2016	98	KOR: 37,562	Think
"Day Day" (BewhY featuring Jay Park)	2016	2	KOR: 1,203,081	Show Me The Money 5
"Tattoo" (Elo featuring Jay Park)	2016	100	KOR: 13,639	8 Femmes
"One Step" (Hyolyn featuring Jay Park)	2016	—	—N/a	It's Me
"SXWME" (Far East Movement featuring Jay Park)	2016	—	—N/a	Identity
"Right Here Right Now" (DPR Live featuring Loco and Jay Park)	2017	—	—N/a	Coming To You Live
"A Boss Do"	2017	—	—N/a	Non-album song
"Call Me" (Dayday ft Jay Park & Gray)	2017	—	—N/a	Non-album song
"Franklin" (Higher Brothers ft Jay Park)	2017	—	—N/a	Black Cab
"Sunday" (Groovy Room ft Heize ft Jay Park)	2017	—	KOR: 106,833	Everywhere
"Thuggin 4 My Baby" (Yultron, Jay Park & Bone Thugs-n-Harmony)	2017	—	—N/a	Non-album song
"Unlock It" (Charli XCX featuring Kim Petras and Jay Park)	2017	—	—N/a	Pop 2
"Money Bag" (Jarren Benton featuring Jay Park)	2018	—	—N/a	Yuck Fou
"With You" (Twopee Southside featuring Jay Park)	2019	—	—N/a	Southside Ambassador
"Does She" (Yuna featuring Jay Park)	2019	—	—N/a	Rouge
"Drip"(Jessi featuring Jay Park)	2019	—	—N/a	Nuna
"Run Me My Money" (Blimes and Gab featuring Jay Park)	2020	—	—N/a	Talk About It
"Flower"(꽃)(Code Kunst feat. Jay Park, Woo, GIRIBOY)	2020	—	—N/a	People
"Ciao" (Joe Flizzow, MK K-Clique featuring Jay Park)	2021	—	—N/a	Non-album song
"MM"(sokodomo featuring Jay Park(prod.sesåme) )	2021	—	—N/a	...---... (S.O.S)
"Love The Way"(Yugyeom Feat. Jay Park,Punchnello)	2021	—	—N/a	Point of View: U
"—" denotes releases that did not chart or were not released in that region. "*" denotes the chart did not exist at that time.

=== Other charted songs ===
Title	Year	Peak chart positions	Sales	Album
Title	Year	KOR	Sales	Album
"Count on Me (Nothin' on You)" (Full Melody English Version)	2010	71	—N/a	Count on Me
"Bestie (Remix)" (Korean: 베스티)	2010	21	—N/a	Bestie
"Speechless" (with Cha Cha Malone)	2010	81	—N/a	Bestie
"I Can't Be Without You" (Korean: 너 없이 안돼)	2011	46	KOR: 49,559	Take a Deeper Look
"Touch the Sky" (featuring The Quiett)	2011	53	—N/a	Take a Deeper Look
"Don't Let Go"	2011	68	—N/a	Take a Deeper Look
"Level 1000" (featuring Dok2)	2011	72	—N/a	Take a Deeper Look
"I Got Your Back"	2011	68	KOR: 63,557	New Breed
"Up And Down" (featuring Dok2)	2011	95	KOR: 43,152	New Breed
"Enjoy The Show" (featuring Dok2 & The Quiett)	2011	100	KOR: 39,426	New Breed
"I Love You" (featuring Dynamic Duo)	2012	85	KOR: 88,016	New Breed
"Clap" (featuring Tiger JK & Yoon Mi-rae)	2012	95	KOR: 74,316	New Breed
"Turn Off Your Phone"	2012	109	KOR: 53,739	New Breed
"Go"	2012	121	KOR: 44,645	New Breed
"Come On Over"	2012	128	KOR: 44,040	New Breed
"Wasted" (featuring Bizzy)	2012	131	KOR: 31,197	New Breed
"Aom&1llionaire" (featuring The Quiett & Dok2)	2012	151	KOR: 26,875	New Breed
"Girl Friend"	2012	170	KOR: 23,068	New Breed
"New Breed (Intro)"	2012	171	KOR: 21,094	New Breed
"I Can't Be Without You" (Acoustic Ver.)	2012	186	KOR: 19,326	New Breed
"I Got Your Back"	2012	187	KOR: 20,819	New Breed
"Let's Make Up"	2013	108	KOR: 26,391	I Like 2 Party
"Secret" (Korean: 올라타)	2013	112	KOR: 34,202	I Like 2 Party
"Hot"	2013	140	KOR: 16,362	I Like 2 Party
"Ride Me" (Korean: 올라타)	2014	89	KOR: 20,063	Metronome
"WORLDWIDE" (featuring Dok2 & The Quiett)	2015	58	KOR: 52,640	₩orld ₩ide
"Don't Try Me" (featuring Ugly Duck & Gray)	2015	129	KOR: 22,834	₩orld ₩ide
"CHA CHA CYPHER" (featuring G2, Giriboy, VASCO, Dayday, Seo Chulgoo & DJ Wegun)	2015	131	KOR: 23,768	₩orld ₩ide
"F*CKBOY" (featuring Sik-K, BewhY & Ugly Duck)	2015	134	KOR: 22,685	₩orld ₩ide
"MOMMAE" (Remix) (featuring Crush, Honey Cocaine & Simon D)	2015	136	KOR: 18,152	₩orld ₩ide
"My" (featuring Lil Boi)	2015	141	KOR: 22,685	₩orld ₩ide
"BO$$" (featuring Yultron, Loco & Ugly Duck)	2015	142	KOR: 24,528	₩orld ₩ide
"When" (featuring Tablo)	2015	143	KOR: 21,408	₩orld ₩ide
"Life" (featuring Paloalto, Gaeko & DJ Wegun)	2015	150	KOR: 21,055	₩orld ₩ide
"Want It" (featuring Genius Nochang & B-Free)	2015	159	KOR: 19,753	₩orld ₩ide
"My Last" (featuring Loco & Gray)	2015	178	KOR: 16,404	₩orld ₩ide
"On It" (featuring DJ Wegun)	2015	197	KOR: 16,473	₩orld ₩ide
"B-BOY STANCE" (featuring Yankie, DJ Wegun & DJ Friz)	2015	199	KOR: 13,650	₩orld ₩ide
"Lotto" (Remix) (featuring Geegooin)	2015	210	KOR: 13,261	₩orld ₩ide
"In This B*tch"	2015	225	KOR: 12,445	₩orld ₩ide
"Seattle 2 Seoul"	2015	239	KOR: 12,207	₩orld ₩ide
"PUT'EM UP" (With Ugly Duck)	2016	117	KOR: 21,061	Scene Stealers
"It's Not Me Who You Used to Know (Remix)" (With Ugly Duck featuring Loco, DayDay, Simon Dominic)	2016	148	KOR: 15,483	Scene Stealers
"PLP" (With Ugly Duck featuring Far East Movement)	2016	229	KOR: 9,894	Scene Stealers
"NOWHERE" (With Ugly Duck)	2016	— (Note: "NOWHERE" did not chart of the Gaon Digital Chart, but peaked at number 215 on the Gaon Download Chart)	KOR: 7,076	Scene Stealers
"—" denotes releases that did not chart or were not released in that region.

=== Soundtrack appearances ===
Year	Title	Song
2007	SBS Conspiracy in the Court: Released: July 9, 2007	Track 4. "正(정)" ("Jeong") – 03:20
2011	Hype Nation 3D	"Demon" – 03:06
2011	Mr. Idol	Track 2. "Summer Dream" (Mr. Children) – 03:54
2012	SBS Rooftop Prince: Released: April 19, 2012	Track 3. "해피엔딩" ("Happy Ending") – 03:16
2013	tvN 우와한 녀 (She Is Wow): Released: May 30, 2013	Track 1. "발칙한 녀" ("Rude Girl") – 03:27
2015	tvN Oh My Ghostess: Released: August 14, 2015	Track 4. "아이즈" ("Eyes") – 03:50

== Other appearances ==
=== As a songwriter/producer/composer ===
Year	Song(s)	Artist(s)	Album
2010	"Clouds"	Dumbfoundead	Clouds
2012	"Can't Stop"; "Can't Stop" (Eng Ver.)	Brian Joo	ReBorn Part 1
2012	"4U (For You)"	U-KISS	DoraDora
2014	"Green Light"	G.NA	Bloom
2014	"Driver"	Younha	Supersonic
2014	"If You Love Me"	NS Yoon-G	If You Love Me
2014	"XX걸"	Ezis	Ezis 1st
2014	"Gettin' Rich"	The Quiett	Ambition
2014	"발칙한 녀"	Kim Seul-gi	발칙한 녀
2014	"Dangerous"	Gray	Call Me Gray
2014	"Handz Up"	Dok2	Ruthless
2014	"Don't Front"	Illionaire	11:11
2014	"Give It To Me"	Crush	Crush On You
2014	"살다가보면"	Jungin	고교처세왕 OST
2014	"I'll be there 2014"	Swings	Vintage Swings
2014	"Thinking Bout You"	Loco	Locomotive
2015	"Apple"	Gain	Hawwah
2015	"맨 위의 맨 위"	Vasco	Madmax
2015	"Awesome"; "높아 2"	Loco	Awesome
2015	"Solo (Remix)"	Yezi	Unpretty Rapstar 2
2015	"Money"	Hyolyn	Unpretty Rapstar 2
2016	"생각해"	Reddy	생각해
2016	"알콜은 싫지만 주면 마실 수 밖에"	Sik-K	I Call It Love
2016	"Our Lives"	DJ Wegun	Our Lives
2016	"Banned In The Motherland"	Dumbfoundead	We Might Die
2016	"Tattoo"	Elo	Eight Femmes
2016	"다 알면서..."	Kwon Jin-ah	웃긴 밤
2016	"SXWME"	Far East Movement	Identity
2016	"One Step"	Hyolyn	It's Me
2016	"Your Eyes"	Hoody	On And On
2017	"Surf"	Double K	Green Wave
2017	"나를 불러"	Day Day	All Day Every Day
2017	"6 Cypher"	Bizzy	워럽형
2017	"h1ghr gang"	Sik-K	Boycold
2017	"나쁜놈"	Los	나쁜놈
2017	"퇴근"	Swings	퇴근
2017	"The Defiant Wons"	Dumbfoundead	Rocket Man
2017	"Daily Look"	Hash Swan	Shangri-La
2017	"Right Here Right Now"	DPR Live	Coming To You Live
2017	"In My Whip"	Dok2	Reborn
2017	"Flashlight"	Minzy	Minzy Work 01 Uno
2017	"Sunday"	Groovy Room	Everywhere
2017	"Life Is A Gamble"	Ja Mezz, Ness, Junoflo, Woodie Gochild	Show Me the Money 6
2017	"Birthday"	Ja Mezz	Show Me the Money 6
2017	"Donut"	PH-1	The Island Kid
2017	"Let's Get It"	Woodie Gochild	Let's Get It

== See also ==
- Jay Park videography
