= Joah (song) =

Single by Jay Park
- Released: April 10, 2013
- Recorded: 2013
- Genre: Contemporary R&B, hip hop, Jazz fusion
- Length: 3:50
- Label: SidusHQ, Universal Music
- Songwriter: Jay Park
- Producer: Cha Cha Malone

Jay Park Korean singles chronology
"Know Your Name" (2012)	"Joah" (2013)

"Joah" is a song by Korean–American singer Jay Park, released on April 10, 2013, worldwide on iTunes and domestically in Korea as a three-track digital single of the same name. The other songs on the single are "1 Hunnit", and "Welcome". The lyrics are written by Park, and the song was produced by fellow Art of Movement member, Cha Cha Malone. In Korean, "Joah" translates literally to "like" (Korean: 좋아; RR: Joa), or in context of the song, "I like you".

== Background and composition ==
Park was inspired to write the song by the change of season in Korea from winter to spring, with the weather getting warmer and warmer. He wanted to make a feel good, old-school song, with inclusion of a brass band, and was influenced by The Jackson 5. The live band of Saturday Night Live Korea, Common Ground, provided the in-session instrumentals.

The music video depicts various locations filmed around Seattle, with the album artwork featuring the iconic Pike Place Market. Park's outfits include a green jacket and hat bearing the logo of the Seattle SuperSonics.

== Track listing ==
No.	Title	Lyrics	Music	Length
1.	"Joah" (Korean: 좋아; RR: Joa)	Jay Park	Cha Cha Malone, Park	3:50
2.	"1 Hunnit (featuring Dok2)" (Korean: 사실이야; RR: Sasiriya)	Park, Dok2	LODEF, Park	3:24
3.	"Welcome"	Park	Cha Cha Malone, Park	3:25
Total length:				10:39

== Credits ==
- Jay Park – songwriting, vocals, production
- Cha Cha Malone – producer
- Common Ground – in-session band

== Release history ==
Country	Date	Format
Worldwide	April 10, 2013	Digital download
