= Speechless (Jay Park and Cha Cha Malone song) =

Single by Jay Park & Cha Cha Malone
- Released: October 4, 2010
- Recorded: 2010
- Genre: R&B, Soul
- Length: 3:59
- Label: SidusHQ, Yedang Company
- Songwriter: Cha Cha Malone
- Producer: Cha Cha Malone

Jay Park English singles chronology
"Bestie" (2010)	"Speechless" (2010)	"Demon" (2011)

"Speechless" is a duet between American singers Jay Park and Cha Cha Malone, released on October 4, 2010 worldwide on Bandcamp, then on iTunes on October 11, 2010. It was also included in Park's single album released in South Korea "Bestie".

== Background ==
The song was written and composed by fellow AOM crew member Cha Cha Malone, who also produced Jay Park's Bestie which was released at the same time.

== Track listing ==
No.	Title	Lyrics	Music	Mixer	Length
1.	"Speechless"	Cha Cha Malone	Cha Cha Malone	The Quiett	3:59
Total length:					3:59
