= Cypress Creek High School (Texas) =

Public school in Texas, United States

Location
- 9815 Grant Road; Houston, Texas 77070; United States; 29.966597°N 95.565292°W

Information
- Type: Public high school
- Motto: You Just Can't Hide That Cougar Pride
- Established: 1977
- School district: Cypress-Fairbanks Independent School District
- Principal: Martin Drayton
- Teaching staff: 219.06 (on an FTE basis)
- Grades: 9–12
- Enrollment: 3,239 (2023–2024)
- Student to teacher ratio: 14.79
- Colors: Blue and Silver
- Athletics: UIL 6A
- Athletics conference: University Interscholastic League
- Mascot: Cougars
- Newspaper: Cougar Connection
- Website: cycreek.cfisd.net

Cypress Creek High School, colloquially known as Cy-Creek, is a secondary public school located in unincorporated Harris County, Texas, United States. Cypress Creek, which serves grades 9 through 12, is a part of the Cypress-Fairbanks Independent School District.

== History ==
Cypress Creek High School opened in the fall of 1977. The first graduating class was in 1980. Over the years, several additions were made to expand the building. In 2004, a major renovation project was passed by Proposition 1 from the 2004 Bond Referendum. All of the interior and much of the exterior is to be remodeled, and new classrooms are to be added. The project was expected to cost approximately $51 million and was completed in 2010. The new renovations, included a new wing in the building, made room for 50 to 100 additional classes, and renovated the old parts of the school dating back to the 1970s. As well, a "Black Box Theatre", a Multi-Purpose Room (nicknamed the "Lego Gym"), and 6 Assistant Principal/Counselor offices, which were spread around the school, were included in the additions.

Cypress Creek features a CISCO Networking Academy class. Students may commute from other Cypress-Fairbanks high schools to take the course. Additionally, in the school year 2010–2011, an ROTC program was finally added to the school after years of students commuting to other high school campuses to participate in the programs.

== Academics ==
For the 2018–2019 school year, the school received a B grade from the Texas Education Agency, with an overall score of 89 out of 100. The school received a B grade in two domains, School Progress (score of 88) and Closing the Gaps (score of 86), and an A grade in Student Achievement (score of 90). The school received five of the seven possible distinction designations for Academic Achievement in Science, Academic Achievement in Mathematics, Academic Achievement in English Language Arts/Reading, Top 25% Comparative Academic Growth, and Top 25%: Comparative Closing the Gaps. The school did not receive distinction designations for Academic Achievement in Social Studies and Post-Secondary Readiness.

=== Academy system ===
Along with the renovations in the 2010–2011 school year, Cypress Creek HS implemented a new "Academy" System based on 16 career pathways as deemed by the organization Achieve Texas, and based on different high schools around the state of Texas and the Country (including nearby Atascocita High School). The administration at Cy Creek combined many of these academies to form 6 that students can choose from. They include:

- Academy A: AIM (Agriculture, Architecture, Industrial and Manufacturing)
  - Programs of Study: Architectural Designer, Interior Design, Agriculture Welding, Animal Science, Transportation Servicing and Maintenance, Heavy Industrial Metal (welding), Environmental Service Systems, Veterinary Science, Warehousing and Distribution, Plant and Animal Technology
- Academy B: Business and Finance
  - Programs of Study: Administrative and Information Support, Advertising & Sales Promotion Marketing, Banking & Related Services, eMarketing, Financial Management, and Accounting, Management, Marketing.
- Academy C: Education and Human Services
  - Programs of Study: Culinary Arts, Education-Teacher (Small Children and School-Age), Personal Care Services, Restaurant and Food Services (management), Therapeutic Services.
- Academy D: Government, Law and Public Administration
  - Programs of Study: Law Enforcement, Legal Services-Technical, Pre-Law, National Defense & Public Administration.
- Academy E: STEM (Science, Technology, Engineering, and Mathematics) (the most popular academy)
  - Programs of Study: Engineering Technician, Pre-Engineering, Health Science Biotechnology, Health Science Diagnostic Services and Health Information, Medical Support Services, Health Science Therapeutic Service/ Patient Care.
- Academy F: Arts, Communication and Information Technology
  - Programs of Study: Arts and Animation, Fine Arts (including Dance, Dramatic Arts, Musical, Vocal), Visual Arts (including Artist and Fashion Design), Interior Design, Journalism, Web and Digital Media, Computer Information Systems, Computer Systems Technician, Network Systems Engineering, Software Engineer, Technology Engineer, Radio/Television, Sound/Video/Film Production.

Each academy includes one Counselor and one Assistant Principal to guide the students (that total approximately 400–600 in each academy) toward the career that interests them. Additionally, each staff member will follow approximately 15 students during the year to help the students if needed. However, changes to academies may be made at the end of each school year if the student feels like his/her future lies in a different pathway.

With the new academies and the administration of Cy Creek trying to steer the campus into a new way of teaching to better prepare the students for their future, a new bell schedule was implemented in the 2010–2011 school year. On Mondays, Tuesdays, and Fridays, the students attend their regular 7 classes with 6 minutes in between each class. However, Wednesdays and Thursdays implement a "Block Schedule" in order to get more information to the students in a longer class period. Wednesdays include 1st, 3rd, 5th, and 7th periods as well as an advocacy period in which a teacher advises a group of students (all students share gender, grade, and academy) in their high school career. On Thursdays, students attend 2nd, 4th, and 6th periods and are released from the campus at 12:58 (instead of the normal 2:30). This new schedule was implemented in order to include the advocacy time, and to allow for training of teachers during the extra time after school on Thursdays, without extending teacher's working hours. Although the plan had been met with a surprising liking from the students and parents, the bell schedule was eventually reverted to 7:20AM – 2:40PM for 5 days a week during the 2016–2017 school year.

== Demographics ==
The demographic breakdown of the 3,374 students enrolled for 2020–21 was:

- African American:' 27.4%
- Hispanic: 37.4%
- White: 21.3%
- Native American: 0.5%
- Asian: 10.5%
- Pacific Islander: 0.1%
- Two or More Races: 2.8%

55.7% of students attending Cypress Creek High School were eligible for free or reduced-price lunches.

== Attendance zone ==
Willowbrook, Houston is in the school's attendance zone.

== Notable alumni ==
- Chris Hutchinson (1988), college football player (University of Michigan)
- Sam Adams (1991), NFL football player (Texas A&M University, Seattle Seahawks, Baltimore Ravens, Oakland Raiders, Buffalo Bills, Cincinnati Bengals, Denver Broncos)
- Dan Neil (1992), NFL football player (Denver Broncos)
- Ike Nwankwo (1993), NCAA/International basketball player, University of California, Los Angeles
- Martha Madison (1995), Actress, Days of our Lives
- Artemis Pebdani (1995), Actress, Scandal, It's Always Sunny in Philadelphia
- Josh Williams (1995), NFL football player (Indianapolis Colts)
- B. J. Symons (1999), football player (Houston Texans, Chicago Bears, Texas Tech University, Frankfurt Galaxy, Berlin Thunder, Tampa Bay Storm)
- Paul Janish (2001), Major League Baseball player (Cincinnati Reds)
- Matt Kingsley (2004), basketball player
- Brian Puspos (2004), choreographer, recording artist, and member of SoReal Cru
- Chris Brooks (2005), Olympic gymnastics at the 2016 Summer Olympics (USA)
- Tam Dinh (2008), professional basketball player in Vietnam
- Cameron Fleming (2010), NFL football player (New England Patriots)
- Jon Cozart (2011), Internet personality, musician, comedian
- Chuckie Keeton (2011), College Football QB Coach (Utah State University)
- Jordan Hicks (2015), Major League Baseball player (Toronto Blue Jays)
- Miles Battle (2018), college football cornerback (University of Mississippi, University of Utah)
- Rori Harmon (2021), basketball player for the Washington Mystics

== Feeder patterns ==
Schools that feed into Cypress Creek include:

- Elementary schools: Hancock, Matzke, Moore, Yeager, Danish (partial), Francone (partial), Hamilton (partial), Millsap (partial), Willbern (partial)
- Middle schools: Bleyl, Campbell (partial), and Hamilton (partial)

== Scandals ==
Brian Drake, the Cypress Creek High School band director in 2017, is accused of having sex with a former student and was removed from campus.

Court records show the Cypress-Fairbanks Independent School District Police Department received a tip on Sept. 16 that Brian had "manipulated" a former Cypress Creek High School student into an inappropriate relationship while she was still enrolled as a student at the school. Police said the tipster claimed Brian was threatening the student by saying he would kill himself if his wife or anyone else found out about their relationship.

"We were outraged to learn that a Cypress Creek high school teacher was accused of conduct inconsistent of that of a CFISD employee. Due to the seriousness of the allegations, he was immediately removed from the campus, and we will continue to cooperate fully with the investigation by law enforcement. Any compromise to student safety will not be tolerated."

— statement released by Cypress Fairbanks ISD officials
