= Brian Puspos =

- Born: Brian Puspos; May 2, 1986 (age 40); Houston, Texas, United States
- Genres: R&B; soul
- Occupations: Dancer; choreographer; singer; songwriter
- Instrument: Vocals
- Years active: 2006–present
- Label: 88rising
- Formerly of: SoReal Cru
- Spouse: Aja Dang (m. 2022)
- Website: www.vgxog.com/videos/

Brian Puspos is a Filipino-American choreographer & recording artist from Houston, Texas. He was a member of SoReal Cru, who were declared runners up in Season 2 of the America's Best Dance Crew (ABDC) championship in 2008. Later, in season 7 of ABDC, Puspos performed with Most Wanted Crew in 2012. In 2012 and 2014, he received the Male Choreographer of the Year title by World of Dance.

== Early life ==
Puspos was born in 1986 in Houston, Texas, where he also grew up. A Filipino by heritage, he went to Cypress Creek High School (Harris County, Texas). Puspos looked to shows such as Fresh Prince of Bel-Air and Martin as a source of influence and inspiration into his choreography. He spent his childhood years as a backup dancer, choreographing and performing at local talent shows and for various upcoming Houston artists.

== Career ==
Puspos conducts workshops, teaches and performs in more than 40 countries across the world. He has worked with and choreographed videos for various popular artists such as Justin Bieber, Chris Brown, BTS, and Marques Houston. He made his debut EP titled Slow Love and Bangin' in January 2017. Puspos featured in rapper GoldLink's music video for Spectrum.
