= 26th Golden Disc Awards =

2012 South Korean music awards ceremony

- Date: January 11–12, 2012
- Location: Kyocera Dome, Osaka
- Country: Japan
- Hosted by: Leeteuk; Park Gyu-ri; Lee Hong-gi; Bae Suzy

Television/radio coverage
- Network: JTBC

The 26th Golden Disc Awards took place on January 11–12, 2012, at the Kyocera Dome in Osaka, Japan. It honored the best in South Korean music released from January 1, 2011, through November 30, 2011. The event was held outside South Korea for the first time in the ceremony's history since its founding in 1986, as well as the first time at the beginning of the following year instead of December. Leeteuk, Park Gyu-ri, Lee Hong-gi, and Bae Suzy served as the hosts for the event.

== Criteria ==
The winners of the digital music and album categories were determined by music sales (80%) and a panel of music experts (20%). The Rookie Artist of the Year award was based on album sales (80%), a panel of music experts (10%) and online votes (10%), while the Popularity Award was based on online votes (80%) and album sales (20%).

== Winners and nominees ==
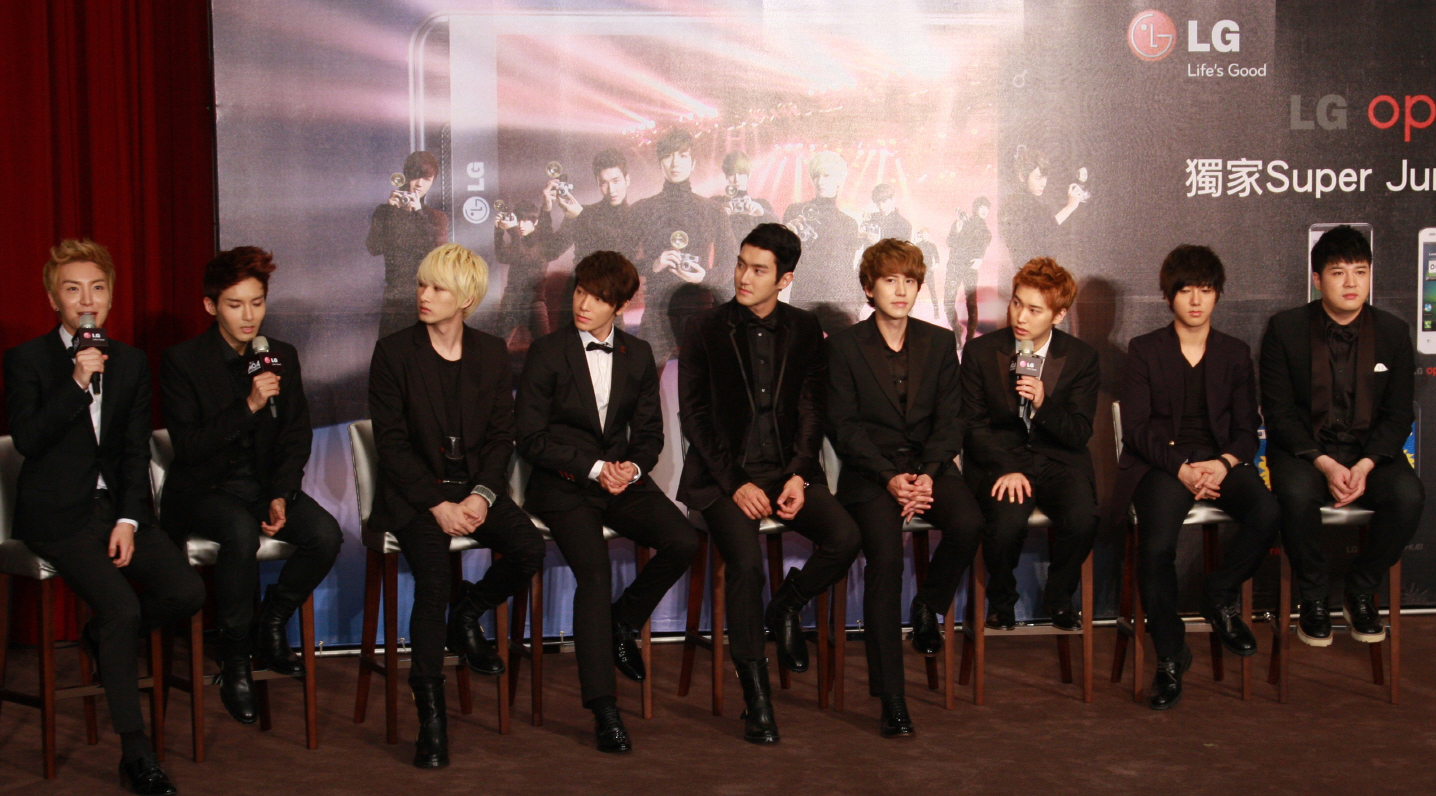
Super Junior – Album Bonsang, Album Daesang, Popularity Award and MSN Japan Award

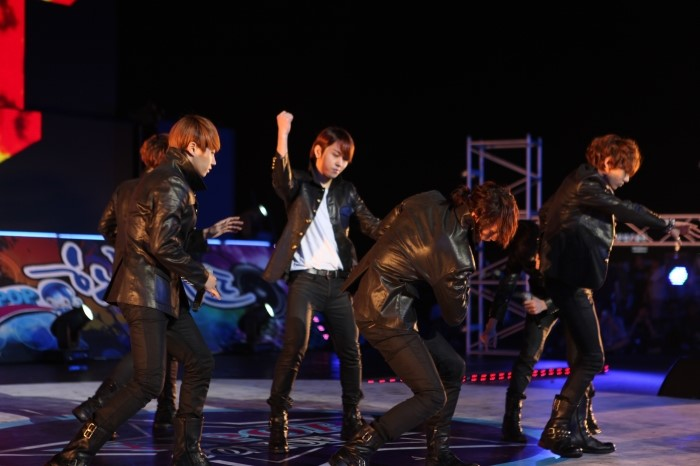
Beast – Album Bonsang, MSN International Award and Ceci Asia Icon Award

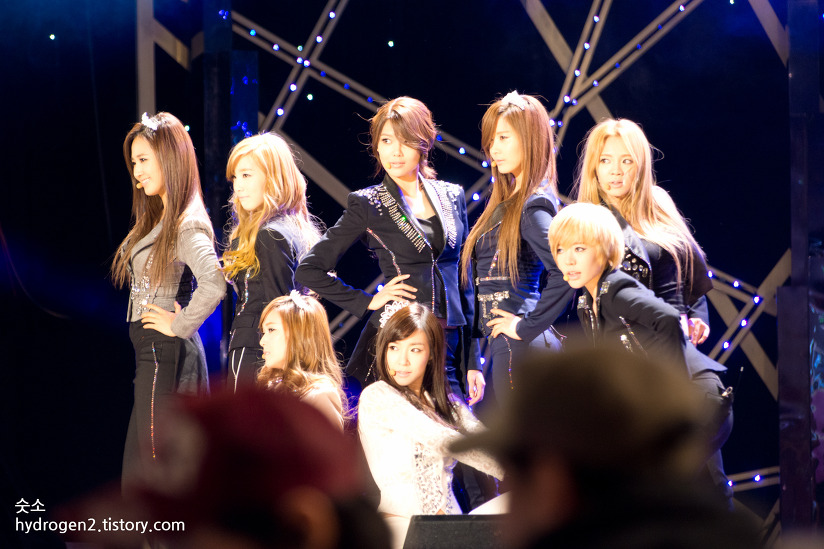
Girls' Generation, Digital Bonsang and Digital Daesang

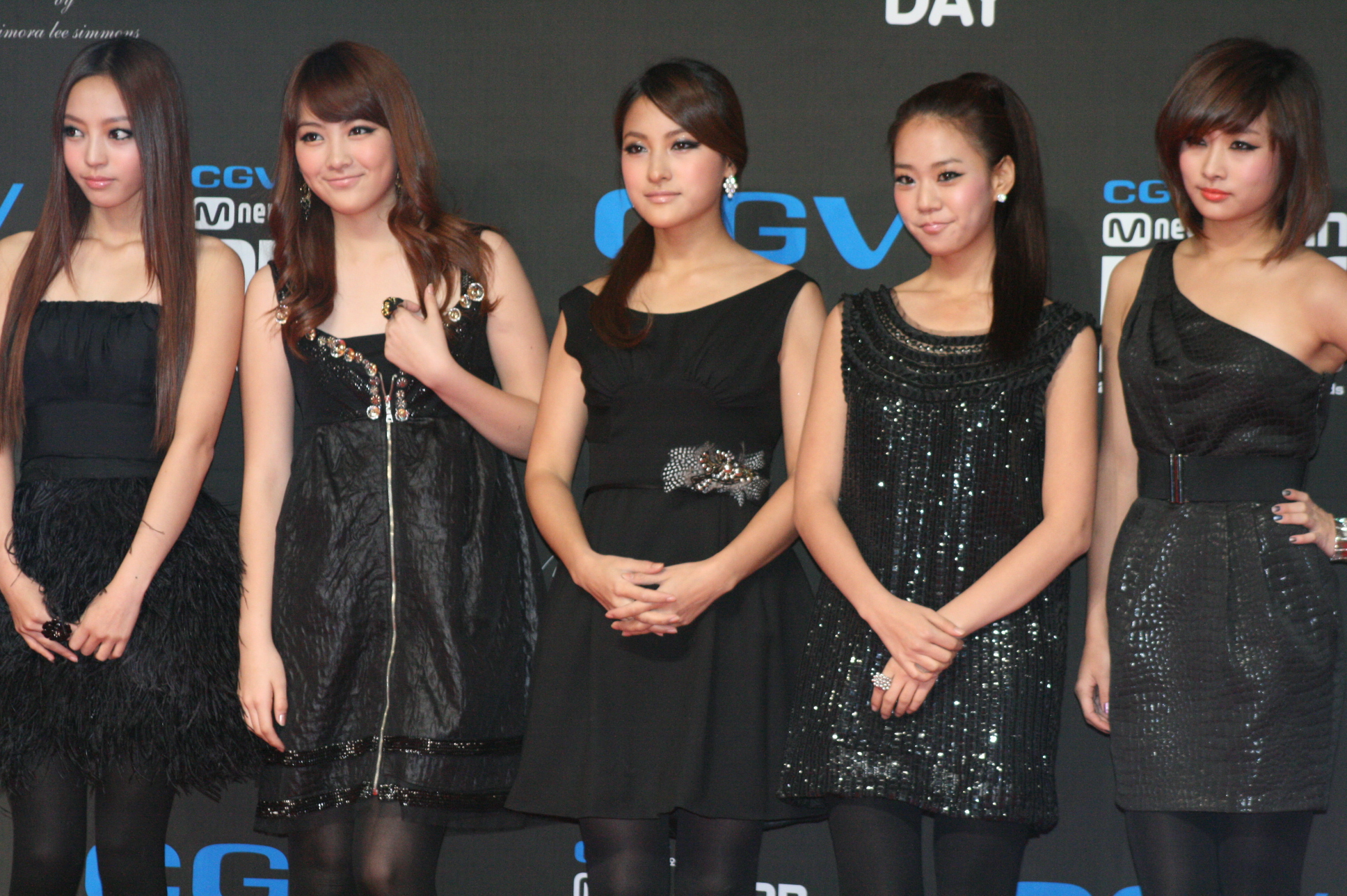
Kara, Album Bonsang and Best Hallyu Star Award

=== Main awards ===
Winners and nominees are listed in alphabetical order. Winners are listed first and emphasized in bold.

Digital Daesang (Song of the Year)	Disc Daesang (Album of the Year)
**Girls' Generation** **– "The Boys"**; 4Minute – "Mirror Mirror"; CNBLUE – "Intuition"; G.NA – "Black and White"; K.Will – "My Heart Is Beating"; Miss A – "Good-Bye Baby"; Secret – "Starlight Moonlight"; Sistar – "So Cool"	**Super Junior – Mr. Simple**; Beast – Fiction and Fact; CNBLUE – First Step; f(x) – Pinocchio; Infinite – Over the Top; Jay Park – Take a Deeper Look; Kara – Step; MBLAQ – BLAQ Style
Digital Song Bonsang	Album Bonsang
**4Minute – "Mirror Mirror"**; **CNBLUE – "Intuition"**; **Girls' Generation – "The Boys"**; **G.NA – "Black and White"**; **K.Will – "My Heart Is Beating"**; **Miss A – "Good-bye Baby"**; **Secret – "Starlight Moonlight"**; **Sistar – "So Cool"**; 2NE1 – "Lonely"; 2PM – "Hands Up"; 4Men – "Live at Least Once"; Beast – "On Rainy Days"; F.T. Island – "Hello Hello"; f(x) – "Pinocchio (Danger)"; IU – "The Story I Didn’t Know"; Lee Seung-gi – "Time for Love"; MBLAQ – "Mona Lisa"; Park Bom – "Don’t Cry"; Wheesung – "Heartsore Story"; Wonder Girls – "Be My Baby"	**Beast – Fiction and Fact**; **CNBLUE – First Step**; **f(x) – Pinocchio**; **Infinite – Over the Top**; **Jay Park – Take a Deeper Look**; **Kara – Step**; **MBLAQ – BLAQ Style**; **Super Junior – Mr. Simple**; 2PM – Hands Up; 4Minute – 4Minutes Left; After School – Virgin; Brown Eyed Girls – Sixth Sense; F.T. Island – Return; Girls' Generation – The Boys; Kiha & The Faces – Kiha & The Faces; Leessang – Asura Balbalta; Lee Seung-gi – Tonight; Miss A – A Class; Sung Si-kyung – The First; Wonder Girls – Wonder World
Rookie Artist of the Year	Popularity Award
**Apink**; **B1A4**; **Dal Shabet**; **Boyfriend**; **Huh Gak**	**Super Junior**

=== Special awards ===
Award	Winner(s)
MSN International Award	Beast
MSN Japan Award	Super Junior
Best Asian Group Award	CNBLUE
Best Hallyu Star Award	Kara
Hallyu Icon Award	Infinite; Rainbow; Supernova
ViVi Dream Award	CNBLUE
Best Rock Band Award	F.T. Island
Cosmopolitan Artist Award	F.T. Island
Ceci Asia Icon Award	Beast
Producer Award	Hong Seung-seong (Cube Entertainment)

== Controversy ==
The event was met with several controversies. The absences of popular artist such as 2NE1, Big Bang, IU, and T-ara, with none of them receiving any awards despite their successes during the year led to criticisms over fairness. The ceremony was broadcast through JTBC's Lunar New Year special instead of being broadcast live, which drew accusations of the awards being a "JTBC promotional concert" in an attempt to boost the channel's ratings. The ceremony also drew small controversy for being held abroad, with observers commenting that they did not see how Japan was relevant to the awards when sales figures were calculated from South Korea only. Others pointed out that although the Mnet Asian Music Awards is also a South Korean ceremony that have been held abroad, it had various participants from multiple countries around the world unlike the Golden Disc Awards, where only Korean artists participated.
