= New Breed (Jay Park album) =

Studio album by Jay Park
- Released: Part 1: December 28, 2011 (South Korea); Full album: February 7, 2012
- Recorded: 2010–12
- Genres: Pop; R&B; hip-hop; soul; dance-pop; acoustic; electronic; K-pop
- Length: 55:10
- Languages: Korean; English
- Labels: SidusHQ; Universal Music
- Producers: Cha Cha Malone; Da Beatfreakz; Dok2; Jay Park (also exec.); Jeon Goon; Jung Hoon-tak (exec.); LODEF; Rob Knox

Jay Park chronology
Take A Deeper Look (2011)	New Breed (2011)	Fresh Air: Breathe It (2012)

Singles from New Breed
- 1. "Girlfriend" Released: November 3, 2011; 2. "별 (Star)" Released: December 28, 2011; 3. "Know Your Name" Released: February 7, 2012

New Breed is the first Korean studio album by Korean-American rapper Jay Park. It is divided in two parts, the first part being released as a digital EP on December 28, 2011 and the full album being released digitally on February 7, 2012. It was released in physical format by February 9, 2012.

== Background ==
Park began working on this album even before releasing his first mini-album Take A Deeper Look. The songs produced by Cha Cha Malone were mostly done a year ago before the actual release of the album. Park wrote about 30 songs in the last 2 years, and chose the best from those for his first full-length album. Park chose the title "New Breed" for his first album as a pledge to do new music which he hasn't shown before. He stated via Twitter that he planned to release it as a mini album composed of seven tracks in November. At that time, he had also already finished mixing the title track for the mini-album. However, it was finally decided to release it as a full-length album, divided in two parts. Park revealed a short preview of "I Got Your Back" on Twitter with Jeon Goon, the songwriter and producer of Taeyang's "I Need A Girl" and Wheesung's "Fading Star" (Korean: 별이 지다; RR: Byeori jida) on November 30, 2011. Park confirmed at many times via Twitter many collaborations with top hip hop Korean artists, including Dok2, The Quiett, Dynamic Duo, Bizzy and legend Korean hip hop artists Tiger JK & wife Tasha Reid. Park revealed he worked with famous US producer Rob Knox from the Y's, who worked with top US artists like Justin Timberlake, Rihanna, Chris Brown, Britney Spears and Joe Jonas, for a song called "I Love You". They already worked together through jTBC's audition program Made In U. Park stated that they were around "4 or 5" tracks that he either "threw away or gave to someone else", and that due to announcing a release schedule ahead of time, he felt rushed and pressured to add the finishing touches to the album.

== Composition ==
Park took part in the writing and production of more than 80% of the album. The title song, "Know Your Name", featuring Dok2, is a mix of hip hop, eurodance and pop music. The album includes previous single "Girlfriend". Written and composed by Park, it's an R&B song with a sweet melody and lyrics about a man confessing his love for a woman. Park continued to work with fellow AOM crew mate Cha Cha Malone for 4 tracks in this album : "Up And Down", "Go", "Come On Over" (놀러와; Nolleowa) and "Turn Off The Phone" (전화기를 꺼놔; Jeonhwagireul kkeonwa). While "Up And Down" is an upbeat R&B/hip-hop song, the other ones fall in the genre of R&B. The album also includes Malone's previous track with Park from his first mini-album, "I Can't Be Without You" (너 없이 안돼; Neo eopsi andwae), in acoustic version, with the guitar played by Johan. Park worked with famous US producer Rob Knox and James Fauntleroy from the Y's for the track "I Love You", featuring Dynamic Duo. The song is an electronic hip hop track, with a deep beat and addictive melody. Park and Jeon Goon worked together for the song "I Got Your Back". It is described by music critic Noh Jun Young as "a trendy and groovy song with a good balance of a K-pop and American melody". "Star" (별; Byeol), the title track of the first part, was written and composed by Jeon Goon. The lyrics were reportedly written with the relationship between SE7EN and his girlfriend Park Han-byul in mind. It is an R&B serenade with a 3/4 beat, with a slow jam feel. New Breed also includes hip hop songs, with "AOM & 1llionaire", "Enjoy The Show", "Wasted" (훅 갔어; Huk gasseo) and "Clap". "Enjoy The Show" is described by music critic Noh Jun Young as a "macho, energetic hip-hop" song. The song "Wasted" is rapped by Park as if he was drunk to give the song a realistic atmosphere, to deliver the feeling of drunkenness.

== Release and promotion ==
The first part of the album was released digitally on Korean digital music sites on December 28, 2011. The standard edition of the album was released digitally on Korean digital music sites on February 7, 2012 along with Park's maxi single Take HD Special Maxi Album, while the physical album was released on February 9, 2012. The deluxe edition of the album was released digitally worldwide on iTunes on February 7, 2012, including the acoustic, R&B and Electronic versions of Park's title song "Know Your Name" from Take HD Special Maxi Album and a digital booklet. The concept of the album cover, chosen by Park himself, was inspired by the tattoos of Canadian artist and fashion model Rick Genest a.k.a. Zombie Boy. The cover features a portrait of Park in a black suit and heavy chains with half part of his face looking like a zombie, described as a Mexican "Day of the Dead" skull. Park wanted to express two sides of himself by showing two different faces together : Jay Park as an ordinary person and Jay Park when performing on the stage. On June 13, 2012, Park released the Japan edition of New Breed through Universal J. The Japan regular edition includes the English version of "I Love You" and acoustic version of "Know Your Name" as bonus tracks.

=== Singles ===
==== Girlfriend ====
"Girlfriend"

Single by Jay Park

from the album New Breed
- Released: November 3, 2011
- Recorded: 2011
- Genre: Hip hop, R&B
- Length: 3:14
- Label: SidusHQ, Universal Music
- Songwriter: Jay Park
- Producer: Da Beat Freakz

Jay Park Korean singles chronology
""Tonight""	"Girlfriend" (2011)	"Star" (2012)

Music video
- "Girlfriend" on YouTube

Girlfriend was released as the album's first single on November 3, 2011, in South Korea. and on iTunes on the same day. It peaked at number 28 on the Gaon chart in South Korea.
"별 (Star)" was released as the lead single of the first part on December 28, 2011. The song reached no. 1 on various Korean music sites while being on top of other music sites. It peaked at number 17 on the Gaon chart in South Korea.

"Girlfriend" was written and composed by Park, and produced by Da Beatfreakz. It's an R&B/Hip hop song with a sweet melody and lyrics about a man confessing his love for a woman.

A teaser for "Girlfriend" was released on Park's Official YouTube channel on October 31, 2011. The music video was released on Park's Official YouTube channel on November 3, 2011, along with the single. It stars Park and actress Jeong Yu-mi. There is no choreography in the music video, but Park makes a b-boy dance break with other b-boys in a club. The video also pays homage for the 1980 French movie La Boum, re-enacting the iconic headphones scene.

==== Know Your Name ====
"Know Your Name", featuring Dok2, was released as the album's title song on February 7, 2012. It peaked at number 14 on the Gaon chart in South Korea. The single reached no. 1 on Mnet and Cyworld's music charts and ranked high on all other Korean online music charts upon its release. Music critic Noh Jun Young complimented the song by saying : « Jay Park's "Know Your Name" should be "Know His Name". Listening to this song, I thought it is time to recognize him as a real musician now. He shows outstanding understanding of Hip Hop and Electronic Hip Hop genre among his contemporaries ».

== Music videos ==
The teaser for "별" ("Star"), the lead single of the first part, was released on December 21, 2011 and the music video on December 26, 2011 on Park's official YouTube account. The teaser for "Know Your Name", the title song, was released on February 2, 2012 and the music video on February 6, 2012. A music video for the acoustic version was also released at the same time. The choreographer for the music video of "별" ("Star") is Haw from Prepix. Park's dancers in this music video are all from Prepix. The choreographers for the music video of "Know Your Name" are Andrew Baterina, Jackie Launtchang (both from SoReal Cru) and Haw (from Prepix).

=== 별 (Star) ===
The music video stars Park and actress Son Eun-seo.
Park is singing in a wide living room with high ceilings, wide hallways and white curtains. Park is also seen dancing in the living room, as well as in a room with brick walls in a hip hop style outfit with a red baseball cap. The music video shows sweet and lovely moments of a couple while being together. After the first chorus, a break occurs, and Park drinks his coffee with the foam staying on his lips. Son then gets up from her seat to kiss him, re-acting the foam kiss from drama Secret Garden in a wide hallway, where Park is also seen dancing with dancers from Prepix.

=== Know Your Name ===
Park is seen in a narrow dark room, with flashing lights in the back. Dok2 then starts to rap, and as soon as he finishes his part, Park is seen dancing with Andrew Baterina (SoReal Cru) and Daniel Jerome (AOM). When the chorus starts, they dance with dancers from Prepix in a wide white empty set. After the chorus, Park is seen dancing with a girl in the dark room, with purple flashing lights. Park is then seen in a Michael Jackson-inspired outfit in a white set, and at the end of the chorus, he is seen with thousands clones of him.

=== Know Your Name (acoustic version) ===
The music video stars Park and actress Park Se-young. The music video was released to promote KT's new smartphone, "Take HD". The music video starts with Park entering a coffee shop. He then calls a female waitress, played by Park Se-young, to order a drink, and immediately falls for her at first sight. Then, Park snaps a photo of her with his phone secretly, and then sits on a table next to her. He then begins to dream about her. In his dream, they walk together by the beach, holding their hands happily and share lovely moments together like a couple. The set then changes to a house where Park and Park Se-young play the piano together happily. Park is then seen serenading her and dancing alone in different parts of the house. They share a kiss near the end of the video. At the end of the video, Park Se-young finally wakes Park up, realizing he was sleeping and it was all a dream. However, pictures of them together at the beach in Park's dream are seen on the phone, making Park surprised and smiling.

=== New Breed (intro) ===
This music video is featured around Park's iconic album cover, with make-up inspired by Rick Genest (Zombie Boy). The music video shows Park rapping in front of the camera wearing a hoodie and a snapback. At the end of the music video, Park is shown having make-up applied to his face, and he scares his make-up stylists with a sudden movement, making them jump from his nearly-finished skull face. Park also includes a snippet of him singing his mellow, acoustic track, "I Can't Be Without You", causing laughs around the studio.

== Track listing ==
Part 1
No.	Title	Lyrics	Music	Mixing	Length
1.	"Star" (별; Byeol)	Jeon Goon	Jeon Goon	Oh Hyung Suk	3:13
2.	"Enjoy The Show" (featuring Dok2 & The Quiett)	Jay Park, Dok2, The Quiett	Da Beatfreakz	The Quiett	3:47
3.	"Up And Down" (featuring Dok2)	Park, Dok2	Cha Cha Malone, Park	Cha Cha Malone	3:34
4.	"I Got Your Back"	Park, Jeon Goon	Jeon Goon, Park	Kim Kab Soo	3:35
5.	"I Can't Be Without You" (너 없이 안돼; Neo eopsi andwae) (Guitar By Johan)	Park	Cha Cha Malone, Park, Johan	Kim Kab Soo	3:25
Total length:					17:34

Full album
No.	Title	Lyrics	Music	Mixing	Length
1.	"New Breed" (Intro)	Jay Park	Jeon Goon	The Quiett	2:31
2.	"Know Your Name" (featuring Dok2)	Park, Dok2	Da Beatfreakz, Park	Da Beatfreakz	4:02
3.	"Girlfriend"	Park	Da Beatfreakz, Park	Da Beatfreakz	3:16
4.	"Up And Down" (featuring Dok2)	Park, Dok2	Cha Cha Malone, Park	Cha Cha Malone	3:36
5.	"I Love You" (featuring Dynamic Duo)	Dok2, Dynamic Duo	Rob Knox, James Fauntleroy II	Rob Knox	4:29
6.	"Go"	Park	Cha Cha Malone, Park	Cha Cha Malone	4:07
7.	"I Got Your Back"	Park, Jeon Goon	Jeon Goon, Park	Kim Kab Soo	3:36
8.	"Star" (별)	Jeon Goon	Jeon Goon	Oh Hyung Suk	3:14
9.	"Come On Over" (놀러와; Nolleowa)	Park	Cha Cha Malone, Park	Cha Cha Malone	4:04
10.	"Turn Off Your Phone" (전화기를 꺼놔; Jeonhwagireul kkeonwa)	Park	Cha Cha Malone, Park	Cha Cha Malone	3:49
11.	"I Can't Be Without You" (너 없이 안돼) (Acoustic version)	Park	Cha Cha Malone, Park, Johan	Kim Kab Soo	3:27
12.	"AOM & 1llionaire" (featuring The Quiett & Dok2)	Park, Dok2, The Quiett	Dok2	Dok2	3:56
13.	"Enjoy The Show" (featuring The Quiett & Dok2)	Park, Dok2, The Quiett	Da Beatfreakz	The Quiett	3:48
14.	"Wasted" (훅 갔어; Huk gasseo) (featuring Bizzy)	Park, Bizzy	LODEF	The Quiett	3:02
15.	"Clap" (featuring Tiger JK & Yoon Mi-rae)	Park, Tiger JK, Tasha	LODEF	The Quiett	4:13
Total length:					55:10

iTunes Deluxe edition
No.	Title	Writer(s)	Music	Length
16.	"Know Your Name" (Acoustic version)	Jay Park, Jeon Goon	Da Beat Freakz, Jeon Goon	3:45
17.	"Know Your Name" (feat. Dok2)(Electronic version)	Park, Dok2	ZUWAN	2:52
18.	"Know Your Name" (R&B version)	Park, Jeon Goon	Jeon Goon	2:53

CD+DVD - Special Asia edition
No.	Title	Length
1.	"Know Your Name" (feat. Dok2)(Music video)
2.	"Girlfriend" (Music video)
3.	"Star" (Music video)

CD Only - Japan edition
No.	Title	Writer(s)	Music	Length
16.	"I Love You" (English version)	James Fauntleroy II, Jay Park	Rob Knox	3:23
17.	"Know Your Name" (Acoustic version)	Jay Park, Jeon Goon	Da Beat Freakz, Jeon Goon	3:46

CD+DVD - Japan edition
No.	Title	Length
1.	"Know Your Name" (feat. Dok2)(Music video)
2.	"Girlfriend" (Music video)
3.	"Star" (Music video)
4.	"Know Your Name" (Acoustic version)(Music video)

CD+DVD - Red edition
No.	Title	Writer(s)	Music	Length
16.	"Girlfriend" (English version)	Jay Park	Da Beatfreakz, Jay Park	3:17
17.	"I Love You" (English version)	James Fauntleroy, Jay Park	Rob Knox	3:23
18.	"Carefree"	Jay Park	Da Beatfreakz	3:46
19.	"Know Your Name" (English version)	Jay Park	Da Beatfreakz, Jay Park	4:03
20.	"Body2Body"	Jay Park	Cha Cha Malone	3:15
21.	"Know Your Name" (Acoustic version)	Jay Park, Jeon Goon	Da Beatfreakz, Jeon Goon	3:46
22.	"KL and Indonesia Promotion Tour Footage" (DVD)

== Chart performance ==
The album reached number 1 twice on the Gaon Weekly album chart in South Korea, and also reached number 1 on the Hanteo Weekly chart by selling more than 80,000 copies offline.

The album has been ranked number 1 on the US iTunes R&B/Soul chart. It has also reached number 1 in Canada and Australia, number 2 in Japan and number 5 in France on the iTunes R&B/Soul chart in these countries.

In the United States, the album peaked at number 4 on the Billboard World Albums chart and at number 16 on the Billboard Heatseekers Albums chart though no promotions were made there.

=== Album chart ===
Chart	Peak position
South Korea Gaon Weekly album chart	1
South Korea Gaon Monthly album chart	2
South Korea Hanteo Weekly album chart	1
United States Billboard World Albums	4
United States Billboard Heatseekers Albums	16

=== Sales and certifications ===
Chart (2012)	Amount
Hanteo physical sales	90,481+

=== Single chart ===
Song	Peak chart position	
Song	KOR	
Song	KOR Gaon	KOR Billboard
"Girlfriend"	28	23
"Star" (별)	17	11
"Know Your Name"	14	9

== Release history ==
Country	Date	Format
South Korea	December 28, 2011	Part 1 : Digital download
South Korea	February 7, 2012	Full album : Digital download
South Korea	February 9, 2012	Full album : CD
Worldwide	February 7, 2012	Full album : Digital download
Japan	June 13, 2012	Full album : CD, Digital download
