= Art of Movement =

American hip hop group

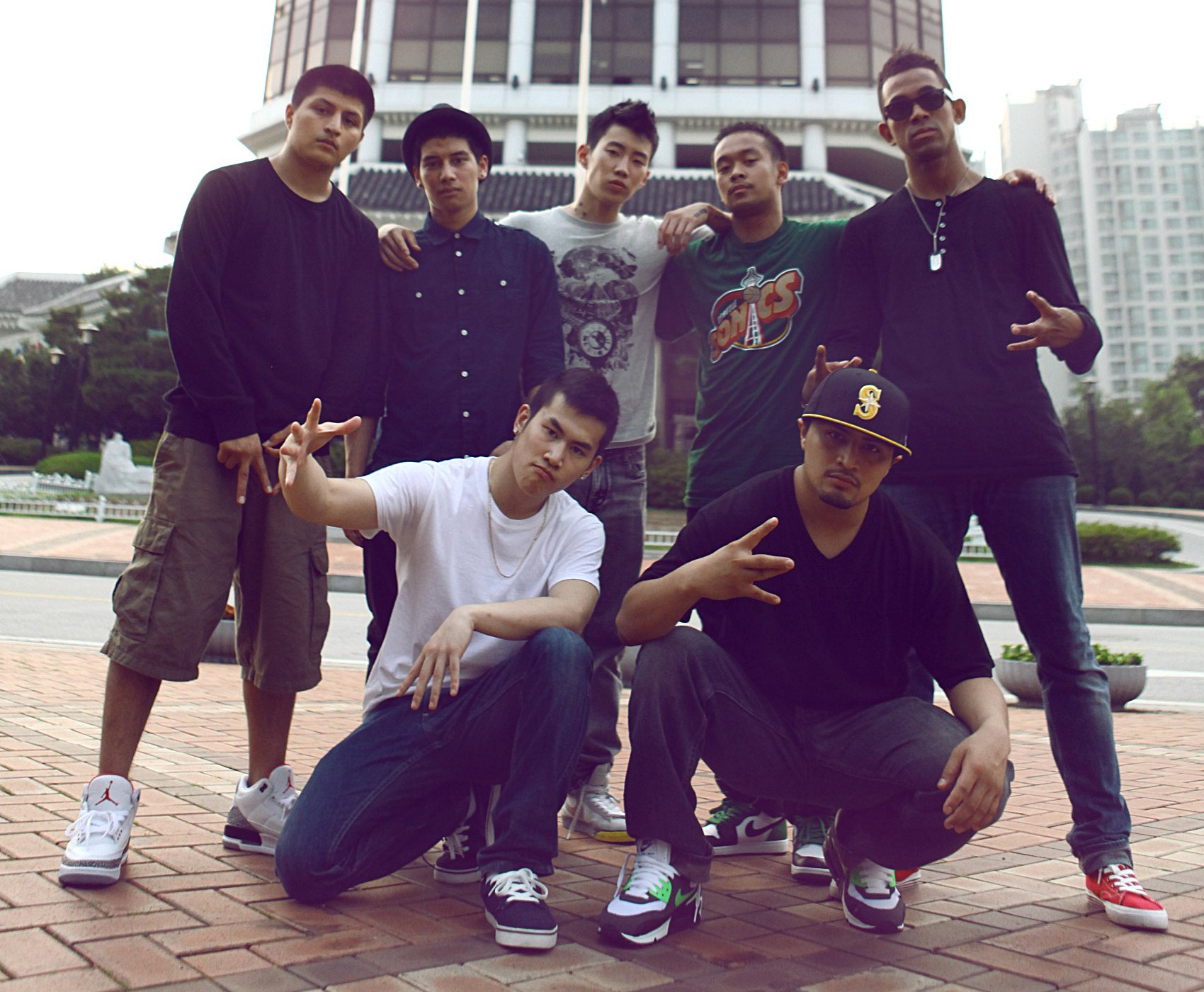
- Art of Movement in 2012

Background information
- Also known as: AOM
- Origin: Seattle, Washington
- Genres: Breakdancing, dancing, choreography
- Years active: 2002–present
- Members: Dial Tone (Tony Orduna); Junior (Junior Orduna); Jay Park; Hep The Tightest (Hiep Do); ChaCha (Cha Cha Malone); Gil (Gil Umali); StepRoc (Daniel Jerome Obispo); Phé La Roc (Leng Phe); Neil (Neil Chand); Bowzer (Bao Nguyen); Ace Chico (Christopher Chico)

Art of Movement (AOM) is a Seattle-based b-boy crew founded in 2002 by brothers Junior and Tony Orduna. The crew received attention due to member Jay Park's popularity as a singer and rapper. Cha Cha Malone is a producer and composer, and works closely with Jay Park, and Dial Tone won R-16 Korea in 2012 with Massive Monkees, another Seattle-based b-boy crew. The crew has appeared on numerous nationally-broadcast TV shows in South Korea, performed worldwide, and appeared in many music videos, exposing the b-boy culture to a wide variety of people.

== History ==
Art of Movement (AOM) started as an idea between brothers Junior Orduna & Tony Orduna in 2000. Along with a few friends, they danced for fun in middle school, and by 2002, AOM became an official crew consisting of a handful of members. After the Orduna brothers relocated to north Seattle, they were introduced to other dancers. In 2003, AOM saw the addition of Jay Park, Chase Malone (Cha Cha Malone), Leng Phe (Phé La Roc), Gil, Neil, and Bao, Chico (Ace Chico) and Daniel Jerome (StepRoc). Over the years, members have pursued other endeavors, such as Jay Park, who went to South Korea in 2005, but have returned to work together, earning a reputation as one of the more respected crews to represent Seattle and the West Coast. The crew has travelled worldwide, performing at concerts in Singapore, Malaysia, the Philippines, and Indonesia, and participating in large b-boy battles, such as R-16 Korea, and have appeared on numerous TV shows in South Korea.

On April 2, 2013, AOM member Jay Park released a video titled "Art of Movement (2013)" on his YouTube channel. The video was filmed in March 2013, and edited by fellow AOM member Hep, showing the crew b-boying and posing on the banks of Puget Sound, with the Seattle Great Wheel in the background, in the crew's hometown of Seattle over the soundtrack of "Stop Me" by Mark Ronson.

== Awards ==
List of awards and achievements by Art of Movement
Year	Event	Location	Result
2012	R-16 Korea, member Dial Tone with Massive Monkees	Seoul	1st
2011	Mighty 4	Portland	1st
2010	Claws Out	Seattle	1st
2010	Mighty 4/Zulu Anniversary, 2 on 2	Seattle	1st
2010	Northwest Sweet 16, 2 on 2	Seattle	2nd
2010	Fight After X-mas, 2 on 2	Canada	1st
2010	Winter Nights, 6 on 6	Shoreline	1st
2009	Outshine Halloween Jam, 1 on 1	Seattle	1st
2009	The Takeover $2000, 2 on 2	Seattle	3rd
2009	Dance Broomz's Dodge Ball $400, 4 on 4	Tacoma	1st
2009	United Styles $50,000, 5 on 5	Boston	3rd
2009	Kill Beats Vol. 4 $1000	Vancouver	1st
2009	"360", Crew vs Crew	Marysville	1st
2009	Ashes 2 Ashes Final Round, 1 on 1	Eugene	3rd
2009	Massive Monkee Day, 7 on 7	Seattle	2nd
2009	Starbar DanceOFF, 1 on 1	Seattle	1st
2008	The Burn $2000, 5 on 5	Seattle	1st
2008	Harbour Dance Series Vol. 6	Canada	1st
2008	Claws Out: Seattle Edition $1000, 2 on 2	Seattle	1st
2008	Rords of the Froor 5	Seattle	1st
2007	Mighty 4	San Francisco	1st
2008	"360", Crew on Crew	Marysville	2nd
2008	Cipher Famous Finals, 2 on 2	Canada	2nd
2008	Breakin' Free $1000, 3 on 3	Hood River	1st
2007	"360"	Marysville	2nd
2006	Breakin' the Silence	Hood River	1st
2008	Eric's Night of Funk	Puyallup	1st
2008	Kingz of WA NBL West Coast Regional	Seattle	1st
2008	Kingz of the US National B-boy League	Tucson	1st
2007	Massive Monkee Day	Seattle	1st
2008	Harbour Dance Series Vol. 3	Canada	1st
2008	Harbour Dance Series Vol. 4	Canada	1st
2008	Texas Smoke Em' Vol. 1	Canada	1st
2008	World of Dance Tour	Pomona/Los Angeles	3rd
2008	Hat Trick B-boy Showdown	Medicine Hat	3rd
2008	Jazzbones, 1 on 1	Tacoma	1st
2002	Cypha	Shoreline	1st
2002	Rec. B-boy of the Month	Shoreline	1st
