= Count On Me (EP) =

EP by Jay Park
- Released: July 13, 2010
- Recorded: 2010
- Genres: R&B; hip-hop
- Length: 13:26
- Languages: Korean; English
- Labels: Vitamin; Warner Music Korea
- Producers: Park Geun-tae; The Smeezingtons

Jay Park chronology
Count On Me (2010)	Take A Deeper Look (2011)

Singles from Count On Me
- 1. "Count On Me (Nothin' on You) (Full Melody Korean Version)" Released: July 13, 2010

Count On Me (Korean: 믿어줄래) is the first extended play by Korean-American rapper Jay Park. The album was released in digital and physical format by July 13, 2010. The EP is a rendition of B.o.B's hit song "Nothin' on You", which Park made a cover of on YouTube.

== Background ==
Back in March 2010, Park made a cover of the original song by B.o.B in his bathroom and released it on his old YouTube account. It was the first apparition by Park since the MySpace controversy and his contract termination with JYPE. The video went viral and reached over 2,000,000 views in less than 24 hours. In Korea, the original song by B.o.B and Bruno Mars topped the Cyworld background music chart in a matter of hours upon the video's release, beating Girls' Generation's song "Run Devil Run" that was released the following day.

Park released a duet single of "Nothin' on You" with B.o.B, where he replaces Bruno Mars' vocals. Warner Music Korea explained that Park's featuring was made possible by music distribution company, Warner Music America's Asian counterpart, SEA, as well as his YouTube cover contributing to much of the song's success in Korea with more than 5 million hits.

Park then released his own version of the song under Vitamin Entertainment, a subsidiary of Warner Music Korea, with the approval of the original writer. Renowned composer Park Geun Tae, who was a part of the production, revealed that the song has a newly added melody and style to fit Park's characteristics. The English and Korean lyrics were written by Park himself. The full EP was released on July 13, 2010.

== Music video ==
Park released a short music video of the song on his old YouTube channel on July 13, 2010. Warner Music Korea also released the short music video on YouTube on their channel on March 30, 2011.

== Track listing ==
No.	Title	Lyrics	Music	Length
1.	"Count On Me (Nothin' on You) (full melody Korean version)" (Korean: 믿어줄래)	Bobby Simmons Jr.; Peter Hernandez; Philip Lawrence; Ari Levine; Jay Park	The Smeezingtons; Park Geun-tae	4:36
2.	"Count On Me (Nothin' on You) (full melody English version)"	Simmons Jr.; Hernandez; Lawrence; Levine; Park	The Smeezingtons; Geun-tae	4:36
3.	"Count On Me (Nothin' on You) (Subman & KYU remix)" (Korean: 믿어줄래)	Simmons Jr.; Hernandez; Lawrence; Levine; Park	The Smeezingtons; Geun-tae	4:14
Total length:				13:26

== Chart performance ==
The single album sold 21,989 physical copies on the first day of release, coming in at #1 in sales and #7 in the overall ranking of albums released from January 2010 to July 13, 2010. With more than 41,316 copies sold at the end of 2010 making the album place at #32 on Gaon's year end chart, Park earned approximately 700 million won from his single album, which placed him at #3 in the overall annual ranking of album released until at the end of July 2010.

=== Album chart ===
Chart	Peak position
South Korea Gaon Weekly album chart	1

=== Single chart ===
Song	Peak chart position
Song	KOR
Song	Gaon Chart
"Count On Me (Nothin' on You)(Full Melody Korean Version)"	2

=== Sales and certifications ===
Chart	Amount
Gaon physical sales	41,316+
