= Demon (Jay Park song) =

Single by Jay Park
- Released: September 5, 2011 (South Korea)
- Recorded: 2010
- Genre: Hip hop, R&B
- Length: 3:09
- Label: Yedang Company; LOEN Entertainment (distribution)
- Songwriters: Teddy Riley, Jay Park, B. Howard
- Producer: Teddy Riley

Jay Park English singles chronology
"Speechless" (2010)	"Demon" (2011)

Music video
- "Demon" on YouTube

"Demon" is a song by Korean-American rapper Jay Park. It was first released as a digital single on September 5, 2011, in South Korea, then as a digital single on iTunes on September 13, 2011, worldwide.

== Background ==
"Demon" was written and produced by Teddy Riley, originally meant for Michael Jackson. It is an OST song for the upcoming movie Hype Nation 3D starring Park as the main villain, "Darkness". The rap verse was written by Park himself. The song was first released in Korea, on various Korean digital music sites. It was then released worldwide on iTunes on September 13, 2011. The version of the song released on iTunes is slightly different, with better sound quality, different cover art, and emphasises more on Park's voice during the rap part.

== Music video ==
The music video for "Demon" was filmed in August 2010 in South Korea. The music video was released on September 5, 2011, on YouTube, along with the single. The choreographer is Andrew Baterina, a member of MTV ABDC's runner-up SoReal Cru, who has also choreographed Park's "Abandoned". It stars Kim Sa-rang, fellow SidusHQ label mate, as the demon who tries to seduce Park. However, it actually took over a year to release the music video. Park himself commented on that, stating he had no control over the release of both the music video and the song, and didn't know himself when it was going to be released. He apologized on Twitter in both Korean and English for the low quality production of the music video.

== Track listing ==
South Korea Release
No.	Title	Lyrics	Music	Length
1.	"Demon"	Teddy Riley, Jay Park	Teddy Riley	3:09
Total length:				3:09

Worldwide Release
No.	Title	Lyrics	Music	Length
1.	"Demon"	Teddy Riley, Jay Park	Teddy Riley	3:06
Total length:				3:06

== Release history ==
Country	Date	Format
South Korea	September 5, 2011	Digital download
Worldwide	September 13, 2011	Digital download
