= Fresh Air: Breathe It =

Fresh A!r: Breathe !t

Mixtape by Jay Park
- Released: May 16, 2012
- Recorded: 2012
- Genre: Hip hop; R&B; pop; electronica
- Length: 19:56
- Language: English
- Producer: Cha Cha Malone; LODEF

Jay Park chronology
New Breed (2012)	Fresh A!r: Breathe !t (2012)	Evolution (2014)

Singles from Fresh A!r: Breathe !t
- 1. "BODY2BODY" Released: May 16, 2012

Fresh Air: Breathe It (commonly stylized as Fresh A!r: Breathe !t) is the first official mixtape by Korean-American rapper Jay Park, released on May 16, 2012. The mixtape was released as a free download on various websites, including SoundCloud, MediaFire, DatPiff, Park's official website, Twitter, Facebook and YouTube channel.

== Background ==
On April 26, 2012, Park stated on Twitter that he will release a mixtape containing songs he will perform for the 2012 Verizon APAHM Tour. He also shared previews of "BODY2BODY", "William Hung" and "Hopeless Love". Park also warned that some of the tracks would be unsuitable for minors. The titles of the songs were not revealed until the release of the mixtape. On May 4, 2012, Park stated via a video on his YouTube channel that the title of the mixtape was Fresh A!r: Breathe !t, and that it will be released in a couple weeks.

Cha Cha Malone and LODEF, who worked with Park in the past, produced the mixtape. Malone is featured on the song "Hopeless Love", produced by LODEF, while Korean-American rapper Dumbfoundead is featured on the song "You Know How We Do". Park and Dumbfoundead collaborated previously on the free song "Clouds" alongside Korean-American singer Clara Chung. The track titled "William Hung" makes reference to singer William Hung who gained fame in 2004 for his off-key audition performance of Ricky Martin's hit song "She Bangs" on American Idol. The title song of the mixtape is "BODY2BODY".

== Track listing ==
No.	Title	Writer(s)	Producer(s)	Length
1.	"You Know How We Do" (featuring Dumbfoundead)	Jay Park; Jonathan Park	LODEF	2:37
2.	"BODY2BODY"	Park	Cha Cha Malone	3:15
3.	"Do What We Do"	Park	Cha Cha Malone	4:02
4.	"Be With Me 2Night"	Park	Cha Cha Malone	4:19
5.	"William Hung"	Park	LODEF	3:34
6.	"Hopeless Love" (featuring Cha Cha Malone)	Park; Chase Malone	LODEF	2:10
