= Take a Deeper Look =

EP by Jay Park
- Released: April 27, 2011
- Recorded: 2010–11
- Genres: R&B; hip-hop; dance-pop; pop
- Length: 27:19
- Languages: Korean, English
- Labels: SidusHQ, Yedang Company, Universal J
- Producers: Cha Cha Malone; Choi Jang-hyuk (also exec.); Dok2; Eroc; Seth Friedman (also exec.); Jay Park (also exec.); Jung Hoon-tak (also exec.); The Quiett

Jay Park chronology
| Count On Me (2010) | Take a Deeper Look (2011) | New Breed (2012) |

Singles from Take a Deeper Look
- 1. "Abandoned (feat. Dok2)"; 2. "Tonight (feat. Kang Min-kyung Of Davichi)"

Take a Deeper Look is the first mini album (second extended play overall) by Korean-American rapper Jay Park. The album was released in digital and physical format by April 27, 2011, and released in Japan on June 13, 2012.

== Singles ==
=== "Bestie" ===
The song "Bestie" was released on October 4, 2010, in advance of the album's release. It was inspired by three members of a 6-year clique entitled "WhatsApp jam". It was first released as a digital single on October 4, 2010 worldwide on Bandcamp, then on iTunes on October 11, 2010 in English, and finally on various Korean digital music sites as "베스티" on October 26, 2010 as a digital single album. The single released in South Korea included the Korean version of "Bestie", a Korean remix version, and the b-side song "스피치리스" ("Speechless") by Park and AOM crew mate, Cha Cha Malone. Park first performed the "Bestie" on August 7, 2010, at the Summer Week & T Beach Festival at Naksan Beach, nearly two months before being official released. Park also performed the English version of "Bestie" at ISA 2010 in Los Angeles.

=== "Abandoned" ===
In 2010, Malone gave Park another song, "Abandoned", and said he made it just for him. He also gave him the title of the song as a 4-syllable melody : "A-ban-don-ed". Park thought it would be great to add a choreography for the song, and asked Andrew Baterina, from MTV ABDC's season 2 runner-up SoReal Cru, to create a choreography for the song. The choreography took 4 months to be completed, being revised several times. Park started writing the lyrics in English first, but never finished, rewriting the song in Korean instead.

"Abandoned" had to be recorded twice, unlike the other tracks of the album recorded at once. Park recorded it again, because he decided to change the melody of the song at the middle. The song was mixed by American audio engineer and record producer Tony Maserati. Lyrically, "Abandoned" is written about a man being abandoned and hurt by a loved woman, expressing the sorrow and felt over a lost love.

In March 2011, Park sang a short snippet of "Abandoned" on the KBS show Guerrilla Date, his first appearance on a public broadcast in over one and a half years.

== Music videos ==
A teaser for the mini-album was released on Park's old YouTube channel on April 19, 2011. It was then re-released on Park's Official YouTube channel on April 26, 2011 as his old account was suddenly deleted.

=== "Abandoned" ===
A teaser for the title song "Abandoned" was released on Park's old YouTube channel on April 21, 2011. It was then re-released on Park's Official YouTube channel on April 26, 2011 because his old account was deleted.

The music video for "Abandoned" was released on Park's Official YouTube channel on April 27, 2011. It stars Park & Miss Korea 2010 contestant Park Mi So. The choreographer is Andrew Baterina, a member of MTV ABDC’s runner-up SoReal Cru, who also made the choreography for "Demon". The dancers in the music video include Park, Baterina, Daniel Jerome (from Park's dance crew "AOM"), Ill and Wassup (both from dance crew "Prepix"). Dok2, who features on the song, also makes an appearance.

A dance version was released on Park's Official YouTube channel on May 7, 2011.

=== "Tonight" ===
A teaser for "Tonight" was released on Park's Official YouTube channel on May 6, 2011. The music video was released on Park's YouTube channel on May 10, 2011. The choreographer is Haw from dance crew "Prepix". There is a dance intro by Park and Haw. Park's dancers in this music video are all from dance crew Prepix. Kang Min-kyung, who features on the track, doesn't make an appearance on the music video. During her verse, Park makes a solo dance instead. After the actual music video, there is a dance break at the end, featuring Park, Rookie (from "Drifterz" crew) and Jotee (from "Rivers" crew).

=== "Level 1000" ===
The music video for "Level 1000" was released on Park's YouTube channel on May 13, 2011.

== Track listing ==
| No. | Title | Lyrics | Music | Mixer | Length |
|---|---|---|---|---|---|
| 1. | "Touch the Sky" (feat. The Quiett) | Jay Park, The Quiett | The Quiett, Park | The Quiett | 3:34 |
| 2. | "Abandoned" (feat. Dok2) | Park, Dok2 | Cha Cha Malone, Park | Tony Maserati | 4:19 |
| 3. | "Tonight" (Korean: 오늘밤) (feat. Kang Min-kyung of Davichi)) | Park | Eroc | Eroc | 3:37 |
| 4. | "I Can't Be Live You" (Korean: 너 없이 안돼) | Park | Cha Cha Malone, Park | Tony Maserati | 4:32 |
| 5. | "Don't Let Go" | Park | Cha Cha Malone, Park | Tony Maserati | 3:49 |
| 6. | "Level 1000" (With Dok2) | Park, Dok2 | Dok2 | Dok2 | 3:56 |
| 7. | "Bestie" (Korean version) | Park | Cha Cha Malone | The Quiett | 3:32 |
| Total length: | | | | | 27:19 |

CD+DVD - Japan edition
| No. | Title | Length |
|---|---|---|
| 1. | "Abandoned" (feat. Dok2)(Music video) |
| 2. | "Tonight" (Music video) |
| 3. | "Level 1000" (With Dok2 (Music video)) |

== Charts ==
The mini album had already recorded 50,000 pre-orders before its actual release as of April 19, 2011. SidusHQ, Park's agency, revealed that they had to expand the limit of pre-orders to 50,000 instead of 30,000 as they were flooded with pre-orders for the mini album. All 50,000 copies of the album sold out within five days after its release date on April 27, 2011. They also revealed that they were producing additional 20,000 copies of the limited edition album to fulfill the requests of the fans.

In the United States, the album peaked at number three on the Billboard World Albums chart and at 26 on the Billboard Heatseekers Albums chart though no promotions were made there.

| Chart | Peak position |
|---|---|
| United States Billboard World Albums | 3 |
| United States Billboard Heatseekers Albums | 26 |
