= Cha Cha Malone =

American musician and entrepreneur

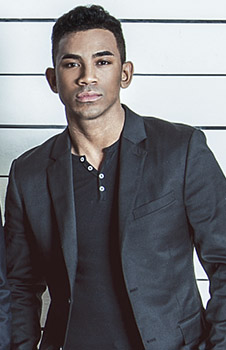
- Malone in 2014

Background information
- Also known as: Chacha the Beat Boy
- Born: Chase Vincent Malone; May 25, 1987 (age 39); Seattle, Washington, United States
- Genres: Hip-hop; R&B; soul; pop; electronic; dance; K-pop
- Occupations: Singer; music producer; songwriter; composer; illustrator; b-boy
- Years active: 2006–present
- Labels: AOMG; H1ghr Music
- Member of: Art of Movement (AOM)

Chase Vincent Malone (born May 25, 1987), more commonly known as Cha Cha Malone, is an American singer, music producer, songwriter, composer, and member of b-boy crew Art of Movement (AOM), from Seattle, Washington. Malone is widely known for his work with Korean-American singer, friend, and fellow AOMG member, Jay Park, which began in 2010 with online hits "Bestie" and "Speechless", and has produced nine tracks for his multi-platinum and award-winning works, Take A Deeper Look and New Breed. In 2011, Malone released an EP, Breakthrough, through iTunes and Bandcamp. Aside from collaborations with Park, Malone has produced and worked with many other artists in South Korea, including Red Velvet, Loona, Cho Seungyoun, Shinhwa, Kara, Dok2, The Quiett, Beenzino, U-KISS, NU'EST, One, B1A4, Baekhyun, and Onew. Malone's distinctive producer tag, the phrase 'I need a cha cha beat boy', is heavily associated with Jay Park's music.

== Biography ==
=== Early years: B-boying, music production, and illustration ===
Malone was born in Seattle, Washington, to a Filipino mother and an African-American father. He was raised by his mother and his grandmother also played a huge role in his life. Malone's first passion was art and illustration, and from a young age this became his creative outlet. At age 7, Malone began playing the piano by ear, and was influenced by his mother, who used to write songs and sing in a band. Malone used to write rap verses in third grade, and was first introduced to the use of modern technology in beat making when he stumbled upon an early version of FL Studio on a friend's computer in 2000, and has participated in online beat battles at Rocbattle. At age 12, and in middle school, Malone entered the world of b-boying with friends at Seattle-based b-boy crew, Art of Movement, and in 2006 he appeared in Season 6 episode 19 of MTV's Made. Malone graduated from The Art Institute of Seattle in 2009, earning a BFA in Media Arts and Animation, and was interested in working in the field of concept art and visual development. Malone found he was always making time to create music during his studies, even when classes were long and homework was draining.

=== 2009–present: Jay Park, Breakthrough, and South Korea ===
In 2009, Malone sent friend and fellow Art of Movement member, Jay Park, who had recently returned to Seattle from South Korea, a folder of beats to see if he was interested in collaborating. Since then, Malone and Park formed a strong partnership into the producing music and writing songs. In October 2010, the pair's first works were released online; the duet, "Speechless", and Park's single, "Bestie". 2011 saw further successful collaborations between Malone and Park, in which Malone produced four of the seven tracks, including the title track, "Abandoned", on Park's EP, Take A Deeper Look, which went on to win a Golden Disk Award. Also in 2011, Malone produced and wrote his own EP, Breakthrough, with title track, "I Still", a self-inspired and heart-capturing track which Malone calls one of his favourites. Malone hosted Myx TV's Top 10 countdown for a week in 2011. Malone also released "Single Life", which featured Park, as a free download in September 2011.

In 2012, Malone began working with an increasing number of K-pop artists and groups alongside Park, and became a member of production team, Iconic Sounds LLC, who have worked on albums such as The Boys by Girls' Generation, and Only One by BoA. February 2012 saw the release of Park's first studio album, New Breed, in which Malone produced five tracks. The album went multi-platinum with 100,000+ physical sales in South Korea, and peaking at number 1 on the Gaon Album Chart and on international iTunes R&B/Soul charts. Malone and Park produced and wrote "Can't Stop", released in Korean and English, which also featured Park, for Brian Joo's 2012 EP, ReBorn Part 1. Malone and Park also worked together on "4U (For You)" for U-KISS' sixth EP, DoraDora, and on new K-pop girl group Tiny-G's song "Polaris" through South Korea television show, MBC's Music & Lyrics, which starred Jay Park and Lee Si-young. Malone produced three tracks for Park's 2012 mixtape, Fresh Air: Breathe It, including the title track "BODY2BODY", and featured and wrote the track "Hopeless Love". In October 2012, Malone produced "One Love" for South Korean boy band B1A4's 2012 debut Japanese album, 1. 2012 also saw Malone working with American Idol contestant and fellow Seattleite, Mackenzie Thoms.

== Discography ==
Extended plays

- Breakthrough (2011)

Singles

- "Speechless" (2010)
- "I Still" (2011)
- "Single Life" (2011)

=== Production discography ===
Year	Song	Artist(s)	Album
2010	"Bestie" (English Version)	Jay Park	–
2010	"Bestie" (Korean Version)	Jay Park	Take a Deeper Look (EP)
2010	"Bestie" (Korean Remix)	Jay Park	–
2010	"Speechless"	Jay Park & Cha Cha Malone	–
2011	"While Drinking Coffee"	Jay Park	–
2011	"Abandoned"	Jay Park feat. Dok2	Take a Deeper Look (EP)
2011	"Don't Let Go"	Jay Park	Take a Deeper Look (EP)
2011	"I Can't Be Without You"	Jay Park	Take a Deeper Look (EP)
2011	"I Still"	Cha Cha Malone	Breakthrough (EP)
2011	"Let It Go"	Cha Cha Malone	Breakthrough (EP)
2011	"Aggression"	Cha Cha Malone	Breakthrough (EP)
2011	"Different Is Beautiful"	Cha Cha Malone	Breakthrough (EP)
2011	"Manifesto Anthem" (Levis' Denizen Commercial)	Jay Park feat. Kwon Ri Sae	–
2011	"Single Life"	Cha Cha Malone feat. Jay Park	–
2011	"Let It Go" (Remix)	Dok2 feat. Cha Cha Malone	Do It for the Fans (Mixtape)
2011	"Up and Down"	Jay Park feat. Dok2	New Breed Part 1 (EP)
2011	"I Can't Be Without You" (Acoustic Version)	Jay Park	New Breed Part 1 (EP)
2012	"Turn Off Your Phone"	Jay Park	New Breed
2012	"Go"	Jay Park	New Breed
2012	"Come on Over"	Jay Park	New Breed
2012	"Can't Stop"	Brian Joo feat. Jay Park & Beenzino	ReBorn Part 1 (EP)
2012	"Can't Stop" (English version)	Brian Joo feat. Jay Park & Dumbfoundead	ReBorn Part 1 (EP)
2012	"4U (For You)"	U-KISS	DoraDora (EP)
2012	"Polaris"	Tiny-G	Music and Lyrics OST Part 3
2012	"Blastoff"	AFSHeeN & Mackenzie Thoms	–
2012	"More Than Friends (Benefriends)"	Mackenzie Thoms	–
2012	"Crazy"	Mackenzie Thoms	–
2012	"Play"	Bridget 'Jett' Hermano	–
2012	"Rendezvous"	Bridget 'Jett' Hermano	–
2012	"BODY2BODY"	Jay Park	Fresh A!r: Breathe !t (Mixtape)
2012	"Do What We Do"	Jay Park	Fresh A!r: Breathe !t (Mixtape)
2012	"Be With Me 2Night"	Jay Park	Fresh A!r: Breathe !t (Mixtape)
2012	"One Love"	B1A4	1 (Album)
2013	"Appetizer"	Jay Park	–
2013	"Around the World"	Mizz Nina feat. Jay Park	–
2013	"Joah" (좋아)	Jay Park	"Joah" (Digital Single)
2013	"Welcome"	Jay Park	"Joah" (Digital Single)
2013	"Sending You My Love" (멀리 있더라도)	Andrew Choi	Love Was Enough (EP)
2013	"I Like 2 Party"	Jay Park	I Like 2 Party (EP)
2013	"Hot"	Jay Park	I Like 2 Party (EP)
2013	"Happy Happy Love" (ハッピー ハッピー ラブ)	Kara	Fantastic Girls
2013	"Audition"	Gaia feat. Jay Park	"Audition" (Digital Single)
2014	"Ride Me"	Jay Park	"Metronome" (Digital Single)
2014	"Love Potion"	Gaia	"Love Potion" (Digital Single)
2014	"Good Bye Bye" (굿 바이 바이)	Nu'est	Re:birth (EP)
2014	"Nana" (나나)	Jay Park feat. Loco	Nana 나나 (Digital Single)
2014	"So Good"	Jay Park	Evolution (Album)
2014	"Evolution"	Jay Park	Evolution (Album)
2014	"GGG"	Jay Park	Evolution (Album)
2014	"Hot (Remix)"	Jay Park	Evolution (Album)
2015
2015	"Alright"	Shinhwa	We (Album)
2015	"Stupid Cupid"	Red Velvet	Ice Cream Cake (EP)
2015	"Midnight Sun"	Hot Shot	"Midnight Sun" (Digital Single)
2015	"Rain On Me"	Hot Shot	Am I Hotshot? (Album)
2015	"My Last"	Jay Park feat. Loco, Gray	"My Last" (Digital Single)
2015	"Solo"	Jay Park feat. Hoody	"Solo" (Digital Single)
2015	"Solo (Remix)"	Yezi feat. Jay Park and Loco	Unpretty Rapstar Vol. 2 (Digital Single Album)
2015	"사랑 할 때 아니야 (Money)"	Hyolyn feat. Jay Park	Unpretty Rapstar Vol. 2 (Digital Single Album)
2015	"Worldwide"	Jay Park	₩orld ₩ide (Album)
2015	"You Know"	Jay Park	₩orld ₩ide (Album)
2015	"Cha Cha Cypher"	Jay Park	₩orld ₩ide (Album)
2015	"When"	Jay Park	₩orld ₩ide (Album)
2015	"I Want It"	Jay Park	₩orld ₩ide (Album)
2015	"My"	Jay Park	₩orld ₩ide (Album)
2015	"B-boy Stance"	Jay Park	₩orld ₩ide (Album)
2016
2016	"Favorite Girl"	U-Kiss	Stalker (Album)
2016	"Heartless"	U-Kiss	Stalker (Album)
2016	"2nd Thots"	Jay Park	Everything You Wanted (Album)
2016	"Replay"	Jay Park	Everything You Wanted (Album)
2016	"I Don't Disappoint"	Jay Park	Everything You Wanted (Album)
2016	"Feature feat. Cha Cha Malone"	Jay Park	Everything You Wanted (Album)
2016	"All I Wanna Do"	Jay Park	Everything You Wanted (Album)
2016	"All I Wanna Do (Korean) feat. Hoody, Loco"	Jay Park	Everything You Wanted (Album)
2016	"Limousine feat. KRNFX"	Jay Park	Everything You Wanted (Album)
2016	"Only One feat. Raz Simone"	Jay Park	Everything You Wanted (Album)
2016	"Aquaman"	Jay Park	Everything You Wanted (Album)
2016	"Me Like Yuh"	Jay Park	Everything You Wanted (Album)
2016	"Me Like Yuh (Korean) feat. Hoody"	Jay Park	Everything You Wanted (Album)
2016	"Forever (with DJ Ale Mora)(feat. Cha Cha Malone"	Jay Park	Everything You Wanted (Album)
2016	"전화기를 꺼놔 Turn Off Your Phone (feat. Elo) [Remix]"	Jay Park	Everything You Wanted (Album)
2016	"You Too (너도) feat. Cha Cha Malone"	Loco	"You Too (너도)" (Digital Single)
2016	"Always on My Grind"	AOMG	Follow the Movement Tour
2016	"Nowhere"	Jay Park and Ugly Duck	Scene Stealers EP (EP)
2016	"우리가 빠지면 Party가 아니지 (Ain't No Party Like an AOMG Party)"	Jay Park and Ugly Duck	Scene Stealers EP (EP)
2016	"Tattoo"	Elo	8 Femmes (Album)
2016	"다 알면서 feat. Jay Park"	Kwon Jinah	One Strange Night (웃긴 밤) (EP)
2016	"I Wanna Fall in Love"	Song Ji-eun	Bobby Doll (EP)
2016	"Lust"	Hoody	On and On (Album)
2016	"Gravity"	Mamoru Miyano	The Birth (Album)
2017	"Twilight"	Loona	Kim Lip (Single Album)
2017	"Gettin' By"	One	"One Day" (Single)
2017	"Yacht (K) feat. Sik-K"	Jay Park	"Yacht" (Single)
2017	"Reborn feat. Boi, Double K"	Jay Park	Show Me The Money 6: Reborn Project (Single Album)
2017	"Hangang"	Hoody	"Hangang" (Single)
2017	"That One"	Henry	"That One" (Single)
2017	"Birthday feat. Jay Park, Dok2"	Ja Mezz	Show Me The Money 6
2017	"Birthday feat. Ugly Duck, Woodie Gochild, Hoody"	Jay Park	Birthday Gamble (EP)
2017	"Cadillac"	IN2IT	Carpe Diem (EP)
2017	"Get It All feat. Cha Cha Malone"	Jay Park	Get It All (Online Release)
2018	"93"	Eden	Ryu: 川 (EP)
2018	"높은 너의 하이힐 같이"	Hash Swan	Alexandrite (Album)
2018	"미치지 않고서야"	Hash Swan	Alexandrite (Album)
2018	"Forget About Tomorrow"	Jay Park & Yultron	"Forget About Tomorrow" (Single)
2018	"Different"	WOODZ	"Different" (Single)
2018	"POOL"	WOODZ	"POOL" (Single)
2018	"Stress '1618"	Moment Joon	"Stress '1618 " (Single)
2018	"Sunshine"	Hoody	"Sunshine" (Single)
2019	"Stay Up"	Baekhyun featuring Beenzino	City Lights (EP)
2019	"FLIP"	Zhu Zhengting	Chapter Z (Album)
2019	"Call Me Before You Sleep"	Jessica Jung featuring Giriboy or Elly	"Call Me Before You Sleep" (Single)
2020	"Adios"	Hoody featuring Gray	Departure (Album)
2020	"Heartbreak Theatre"	OnlyOneOf	Produced by [], Pt.1 (EP)
2020	“当一切变成空白”	Justin Huang	18 (Album)
2020	"Ride Or Die"	Kai	Kai (EP)
2021	"Switch It Up"	Jay B Feat. sokodomo	SOMO: FUME (Album)
2021	"B.T.W"	Jay B Feat. Jay Park	SOMO: FUME (Album)
2021	"Love The Way"	Yugyeom Feat. Jay Park & Punchnello	Point of View: U (Album)
2021	"Falling In Love"	Yugyeom	Point of View: U (Album)
2022	"On the Way"	Onew	Dice (EP)
2022	"Shine Bright"	ANA	"Shine Bright" (Digital Single)
2022	"Waterfall"	Minho Feat. Lim Kim	Chase (EP)
2022	"Like Water"	Jambino Feat. Loco (rapper) & Hyuna	Show Me The Money 11 Semi Finals (EP)

== Awards and nominations ==
Award ceremony	Year	Category	Nominee	Result	Ref.
Korean Hip-hop Awards	2017	Producer of the Year	Himself	Nominated	

== See also ==
- Art of Movement
- Jay Park discography
