= SoReal Cru =

- Origin: Houston, Texas, United States
- Genres: Hip-hop dance
- Years active: 2008–2010

SoReal Cru is a hip-hop dance crew from Houston, Texas who gained fame as the runner-up on the second season of America's Best Dance Crew (ABDC). Before ABDC, they won first place at the World of Dance competition in Pomona in 2008. After the second season of America's Best Dance Crew was over, they returned to MTV for a two-part ABDC special, Battle of the VMA's. In the spin-off, popular crews from seasons one and two competed for an opportunity to win $25,000 for charity and to present the 2008 VMA for Best Dancing in a Video. Alumni crews BreakSk8, Fanny Pak, Kaba Modern, Status Quo, and SoReal Cru participated in the event. SoReal Cru danced to Forever by Chris Brown and made the cut in the preliminary rounds while BreakSk8 and Status Quo were eliminated. After the public voted, SoReal Cru lost to Fanny Pak and Kaba Modern for having the fewest votes. After a dance off at the VMA Preshow, the public voted again, and it was announced during the VMA's that Fanny Pak won.

Andrew Baterina also choreographs for famous Korean-American singer Jay Park. SoReal Cru performed with Jay Park to his song "Abandoned" at The Korean Music Festival. They have a hip-hop dance studio, SoReal Studios, in Houston, Texas. Crew member Brian Puspos competed once again on the seventh season of America's Best Dance Crew as a member of Mos Wanted Crew.

== Later career (2010–present) ==
During an interview with crew member Brian Puspos, it was stated that the crew never broke up but "retired". The crew members split into different subdivisions such as: SoReal Pac and ArchiTeks. For instance, Andrew Baterina and Jackie Lautchang are lead choreographers for SoReal Pac while Brian Puspos, Mark Fucanan, Brian Fucanan, Pat Lam and Ailyn Isidro are current members of the ArchiTeks. Brian Puspos also became a member of Mos Wanted Crew to represent ArchiTeks
