= K-Pops! (Music from and inspired by K-Pops! Motion Picture) =

2026 album by Anderson .Paak

Studio album / soundtrack album by Anderson .Paak and various artists
- Released: May 29, 2026
- Genres: K-pop; electro pop; pop; pop rock
- Length: 53:47
- Languages: English; Korean
- Label: Capitol
- Producers: Anderson .Paak; Dem Jointz

Anderson .Paak chronology
Why Lawd? (2024)	K-Pops (2026)	Heavy Is the Crown (2026)

Singles from K-Pops! (Music from and inspired by K-Pops! Motion Picture)
- 1. "Keychain" Released: February 27, 2026; 2. "Aftertaste" Released: May 8, 2026

K-Pops! (Music from and inspired by K-Pops! Motion Picture) is the studio album by Anderson .Paak released through Capitol Records on May 29, 2026. It served as the soundtrack to .Paak's feature directorial debut K-Pops! which starred himself in the lead role alongside his son, Soul Rasheed in his acting debut, and Jee Young Han, Jonnie "Dumbfoundead" Park, and Yvette Nicole Brown in other lead roles. The soundtrack featured collaborative acts from numerous K-pop artists, curated by .Paak and Dem Jointz. The album was preceded by "Keychain" which performed by Aespa was released on February 27, 2026, and "Aftertaste" by Dean which released on May 8, 2026.

== Background ==
K-Pops! is .Paak's first solo musical project after 2019 as an artist serving both as a soundtrack and a studio album. Since .Paak did not release a studio album after Ventura (2019), with most of his works were separate singles and collaborative acts with other artists, he wanted to create a soundtrack accompanying the film as several original songs had been created where he had a lot of fun. But the development of the album, took its own turn thereby becoming a separate studio album of his own.

To curate the album, he collaborated with music producer Dem Jointz who had associated with a lot of K-pop musical artists. He wanted to bring the K-pop artists and bands into his musical landscape, thereby creating a specific solo album in the world of K-pop. He considered the amalgamation of K-pop with Afro-American music was the first of its kind which he had never done before. .Paak further dwelled on how the music of the African diaspora along with rhythm and blues and hip-hop had interpreted into the roots of K-pop, as well as multiple interpretations being done in various locations, but further wanted to respect the culture and music as well as paying homage to it.

.Paak's son Soul Rasheed, who made his acting debut in the film also had worked in some of the songs. He further added that his owing to the film's development, with him entering teenage years, his musical taste also changed with him liking k-pop to Slipknot, and .Paak and Jointz searched for music that suited him and was comfortable with, as he was into different music. The song "Love Is Everywhere", which .Paak had it for years, was then chosen as it suited appropriate and felt with the theme. Rasheed recorded his vocals, while .Paak too re-recorded which he felt nostalgic and appreciated his son's singing talent as well.

The soundtrack featured several K-pop musical acts such as aespa, Lngshot, Crush, Dean, Hongjoong Kim, Jay Park, Nmixx, Chung Ha, Soyeon, Joshua Hong, Kevin Woo, G-Dragon and Chung Ha. It also accompanied multi-lingual musical performances, such as the Japanese boy band JO1, American rapper JID and Corbyn Besson of the American boy band Why Don't We also contributing to the songs.

== Release ==
On February 27, 2026, coinciding the film's release, the song "Keychain" was released, which featured .Paak collaborating with Aespa. The second single "Aftertaste" was released on May 8, featuring .Paak and Dean. The accompanying soundtrack featuring 15 songs was released through Capitol Records on May 29, a day after the film's streaming premiere on Netflix. A vinyl edition of the album was also released on August 7.

== Reception ==
Rosa Delgado of Shatter the Standards called it "A soundtrack that flirts its way through seventeen tracks and only stops flirting twice, when a kid sings and a father answers." Andy Kellman of AllMusic described it as "neither a true soundtrack nor a proper Paak album. That said, Paak can't be accused of merely making a handful of perfunctory appearances and signing off on the rest." Alexander Cole of HotNewHipHop wrote "Overall, it is a cool project, and one that we believe fans will appreciate immensely."

== Track listing ==
K-POPS! (Music from and inspired by K-POPS! Motion Picture)
No.	Title	Writer(s)	Producer(s)	Length
1.	"Flashing Light" (Crush and Anderson .Paak)	Brandon Anderson; Dwayne Abernathy Jr.; Maurice White; Wayne Vaugn	Dem Jointz; .Paak	3:19
2.	"Caution" (Nmixx and .Paak)	Anderson; Lily; Haewon; D. Abernathy; John Yang; Awrii (The Hub)	Dem Jointz	2:43
3.	"Aftertaste" (Dean and .Paak)	Anderson; Sara Diamond; Lazaro Andres Camejo; D. Abernathy	Dem Jointz	3:03
4.	"PITC (Party In the Corner)" (Hongjoong Kim, .Paak, and Jay Park)	Anderson; Park; Kim; D. Abernathy; Jonah Renna	Dem Jointz	3:39
5.	"Fire with Fire" (Lngshot)	Anderson; Louis; Ohyul; Ryul; Woojin; D. Abernathy; David Brown	Dem Jointz	3:55
6.	"Can't Get Enough" (Alissia and .Paak)	Anderson; Alissia	Alissia	3:58
7.	"Bet on U" (Chung Ha and .Paak)	Anderson; Chung Ha; D. Abernathy; Jack Omstead; Rachel West; Rollo; Ufro Ebong	.Paak; Dem Jointz	3:20
8.	"International" (Soyeon and .Paak)	Anderson; Soyeon; D. Abernathy; Eric Griggs; Brandon Perry	Dem Jointz; Blu2th	2:22
9.	"What About Us" (JID and .Paak)	Anderson; Destin Route; Kendrick Nicholls; Noah Conrad; Pera Krstajic	KingJet; Conrad	3:36
10.	"Wanna Buy a Plant + Cost Me" (JO1 and .Paak)	Anderson; D. Abernathy; Alejandro Miguel Garcia; Jason Pounds; Joshua Lee; Salvador Roberto Samano	Bongo; J. Lbs	3:34
11.	"Keychain" (Aespa and .Paak)	Anderson; Cristi "Stalone" Abernathy; D. Abernathy	Dem Jointz	2:50
12.	"One More Dance" (Joshua and Corbyn Besson)	Besson; D. Abernathy; Calle Lehman; David Charles Fischer; Samuel Lee; Shae Jacobs	Dem Jointz	3:10
13.	"Wildcard" (Kevin Woo)	Anderson; D. Abernathy; Khalia Amazon; Maddy Collins-Ryu	.Paak; Dem Jointz	2:50
14.	"Just One Bite" (Woo)	Anderson; D. Abernathy; Amazon	.Paak; Dem Jointz	1:33
15.	"Too Bad (K-POPS! Version)" (G-Dragon and .Paak)	Anderson; G-Dragon; Alissia; Ebong; Jonah Lennox	.Paak; Alissia; BongoByTheWay	2:33
16.	"Love Is Everywhere" (Soul Rasheed)	Anderson; Rasheed; D. Abernathy; Ebong	.Paak; Dem Jointz	3:13
17.	"The Last" (.Paak)	Anderson; Jeffrey Gitelman; Rogét Chahayed; Rae Khalil	.Paak; Gitelman; Jhair "Jah" Lazo; Julio Ulloa; Chahayed	4:09
Total length:				53:47

== Charts ==
Chart (2026)	Peak position
US Top Soundtracks (Billboard)	16
