= El Tiburón =

- Theatrical release poster
- Directed by: Félix Germán
- Written by: Luis Arambilet; Félix Germán
- Produced by: Manuela Germán; Carlos Germán; Luis Arambilet
- Starring: Mozart La Para; Dalisa Alegría; Bárbaro Marín; Tahimi Alvariño; Dominique Telemaque; Cyndie Lundy
- Cinematography: Peyi Guzmán
- Edited by: José Germán Ariza
- Music by: Gerson Arvelo; Isidro Bobadilla
- Production company: Mafe Films
- Release date: November 21, 2024
- Running time: 93 minutes
- Country: Dominican Republic
- Languages: Spanish; Haitian Creole

El Tiburón (lit. 'The Shark') is a 2024 Dominican survival tragicomedy film co-written and directed by Félix Germán. It follows three Caribbean couples who embark on a quest for the American dream across the sea, facing a storm and a shark. It stars Mozart La Para, Dalisa Alegría, Bárbaro Marín, Tahimi Alvariño, Dominique Telemaque and Cyndie Lundy.

== Synopsis ==
Three couples from different countries (Cuba, the Dominican Republic, and Haiti) embark on a dangerous sea voyage to Miami in search of a better life. However, along the way, they face a dangerous shark and storms that will test their strength and unity.

== Cast ==
- Mozart La Para as Dey
- Dalisa Alegría as Doris
- Bárbaro Marín as Viktor
- Tahimi Alvariño as Nadia
- Dominique Telemaque as Ogé
- Cyndie Lundy as Ganne
- Toussaint Merionne as Gang Boss
- Víctor Ramírez as Captain
- Andrés Curbelo

== Production ==
Principal photography took place in January 2023 in Havana, Cuba, and the Dominican Republic.

== Release ==
El Tiburón premiered on November 21, 2024, in Dominican theaters. It was later released on August 14, 2025, in Puerto Rican theaters.
