= Next Level (Mozart La Para album) =

Studio album by Mozart La Para
- Released: May 31, 2022
- Recorded: 2020–22
- Genre: Latin urban
- Length: 45:15
- Label: Cerro Music Group

Mozart La Para chronology
6 Rings EP (2020)	Next Level (2022)

Singles from Next Level
- 1. "Mi Sombra" Released: April 8, 2022; 2. "Mi loca" Released: May 31, 2022

Next Level is the debut album by Dominican urban artist Mozart La Para released on May 31, 2022, by Cerro Music Group. It is the follow-up of 6 Rings EP (2020) and was his first album following his derpature of his former label Roc Nation. It features guest appearances of Gente de Zona, Damián Marley, Nicky Jam, Bulin 47, Musicólogo, Guaynaa, Don Miguelo and Chico Castillo. It had 15 tracks and contains the production of Nítido Nintendo and Dale Pututi. The album intentionally does not include profanity or obscene language.

It was supported by the released of two official singles. "La Sombra" that reached the first spots on the National Report and the second "Mi Loca" featuring Gente de Zona released on May 31, 2022. To promote the album Mozart La Para made series of personal appearances on United States visiting high-profile TV shows such as El Gordo y la Flaca, Univision, Hoy Dia at Telemundo and Colombia, Mexico and Peru virtually. Also, made a promotional tour including a concert on the United Palace in New York City.

== Track listing ==
No.	Title	Length
1.	"Yo Soy la Para"	3:22
2.	"Mi Loca" (featuring Gente de Zona)	2:58
3.	"La Sombra" (with Nitido Nintendo)	3:20
4.	"Medicina"	3:34
5.	"Ponte Bacana"	2:54
6.	"Leyenda Viva"	2:49
7.	"Tucutun" (featuring Nicky Jam)	3:34
8.	"Ahi Viene La Loca" (featuring Bulin 47)	2:12
9.	"Te la Piso" (featuring Musicologo The Libro)	3:18
10.	"Boda en la Playa"	3:07
11.	"Igual Que Yo" (featuring Chico Castillo)	2:50
12.	"Un Sueño" (featuring Guaynna & Don Miguelo)	3:50
13.	"El Diamante"	2:06
14.	"Hasta el Fondo"	2:00
15.	"El Comienzo"	3:21
Total length:		45:15
