= Ganadara =

Single by Jay Park featuring IU

from the album The One You Wanted
- Language: Korean
- Released: March 11, 2022
- Recorded: 2020
- Genre: R&B
- Length: 3:23
- Label: More Vision; Kakao
- Composers: Woogie; Jay Park
- Lyricists: Jay Park; Woogie; Haon

Jay Park singles chronology
"To Life" (2022)	"Ganadara" (2022)	"Need To Know" (2022)

IU singles chronology
"Mother Nature (H₂O)" (2022)	"Ganadara" (2022)	"People Pt. 2" (2023)

Music video
- "Ganadara" on YouTube

"Ganadara" is a song by Korean-American singer Jay Park featuring South Korean singer IU. It was released on March 11, 2022, through More Vision and distributed by Kakao Entertainment. It peaked at number one on the Gaon Digital Chart. The single is from Park's sixth studio album The One You Wanted.

== Recording ==
"Ganadara" was recorded in 2020 but was released in 2022 as Jay Park "wanted to release it at the right time, when I could prepare for it properly and have the [right] time and condition for it."

== Music and lyrics ==
According to IZM, "Jay Park sings "Teach me tonight Ga-na-da-ra-ma-ba-sa" which reflects his real self who is not fluent in Korean. The soft R&B melody and lyrics that capture him being nervous in front of his love interest fit well with his image."

== Music video ==
The music video for "Ganadara" accompanied the song's release. It comically depicts the process where Jay Park asks IU to appear in the video.

== Critical reception ==
Park Sujin of IZM rated "Ganadara" 3.5 out of 5 stars. According to Park, it is a "good pop song" that "perfectly reflects Jay Park's bizarre, cute, but hot personality."

== Charts ==
=== Weekly charts ===
Weekly chart performance for "Ganadara"
Chart (2022)	Peak position
Singapore (RIAS)	20
Singapore (Billboard)	22
South Korea (Gaon)	1
South Korea (K-pop Hot 100)	1
South Korea Songs (Billboard)	6
US World Digital Song Sales (Billboard)	10

=== Year-end charts ===
Year-end chart performance for "Ganadara"
Chart (2022)	Position
South Korea (Circle)	21
