= Dalisa Alegría =

Dominican actress

- Born: Dalisa Magdalena Alegría Gómez; 28 April 1983 (age 42); Rancho Arriba, San José de Ocoa Province, Dominican Republic
- Occupations: Actress; tv presenter; beauty pageant titleholder
- Height: 5 ft 7 in (170 cm)
- Title: Miss San José de Ocoa
- Term: 2003
- Spouse: Manuel R. Álvarez Rodríguez (m. 2007; div. 2019) Mozart La Para (m. 2021)
- Children: 1
- Parents: Pedro José Alegría Soto (father); Eva Engracia Gómez Espinal (mother)

Dalisa Magdalena Alegría Gómez (born 1983) is a film and telenovela actress, and former television presenter from the Dominican Republic.

== Early life, family and education ==
Born into an affluent family of Rancho Arriba, San José de Ocoa Province, she is the daughter of politician and lottery businessman Pedro Alegría and his wife Eva Gómez. Alegría has 2 brothers and 2 sisters.

Ancestors of Dalisa Alegría

4. Rafael Antonio Alegría Domínguez
2. Pedro José Alegría Soto (born 1951); Rancho Arriba, Dominican Republic
10. Heriberto Soto
5. Mercedes Nidia Soto Martínez
11. María Martínez
1. Dalisa Magdalena Alegría Gómez (born 1983)
24. Manuel de la Cruz Gómez Delgado
12. Manuel de Jesús Gómez Ramírez (1885–1936)
25. Concepción Ramírez Serrano
6. José Miguel Gómez Alfonso
26. Francisco Alfonso Alfonso
13. María Eva Altagracia Alfonso Quezada (1893–1975); Santiago de los Caballeros, Dominican Republic
27. Altagracia Quezada Llaverías
3. Eva Engracia Gómez Espinal
14. Pedro Espinal
7. Dalinda Espinal Tavárez
15. Guillermina Tavárez

== Career ==
She was Miss San José de Ocoa on Miss Dominican Republic 2003 the year Amelia Vega won Miss Universe.

Alegría was nominated in the Best Supporting Actress category of the Soberano Awards in 2013 for her role in Lotoman 2.0.

In 2014, Alegría was finalist on Luz García’s Cuerpos Hot del Verano annual contest.

== Filmography ==
Year	Title	Character	Country
2006	Las dos caras de Ana (telenovela)	Belén	Mexico
2007	Acorralada (telenovela)	TV host	United States
2007	Bajo las riendas del amor (telenovela)	student	Mexico
2009	El secreto de Jimena	Jimena	United States
2012	Lotoman 2.0	Mechy	Dominican Republic
2013	Biodegradable	Secretaria Sr. Blas	Dominican Republic
2014	Lotoman 003	Mechy	Dominican Republic
2014	El Pelotudo	Rosemary	Argentina
2017	Luis	Teniente Anilsa	Dominican Republic
2018	Pobres millonarios	Amelia	Dominican Republic
2018	Broken island	Meuda	Dominican Republic
2019	Casi fiel	Carolina	Dominican Republic
2019	Sol y Luna	Luna	Dominican Republic
2019	Killing Sarai	Lydia	United States
2020	Herencia	Verónica Flores	United States
2021	Más que el agua	prosecutor	Dominican Republic
2021	Carta blanca	Carmen María	Dominican Republic
2024	El Tiburón	Doris	Dominican Republic
TBA	El escuadrón	—N/a	Dominican Republic
TBA	Duele decidir	Virginia	Dominican Republic
