= Honey J =

South Korean dancer (born 1987)

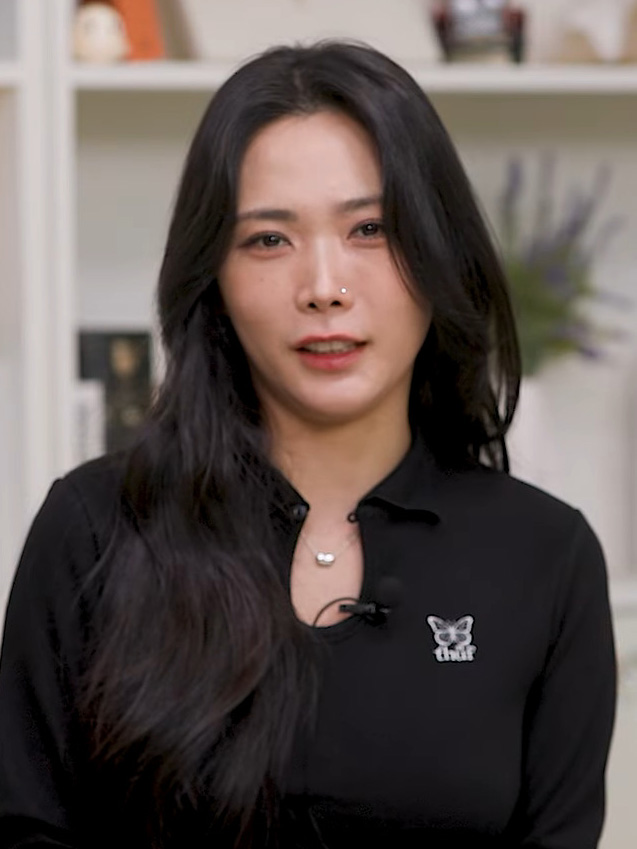
- Honey J in 2026
- Born: Jeong Hanee; August 26, 1987 (age 39); Cheongju, South Korea
- Education: Paekche Institute of the Arts (AA)
- Occupations: Choreographer; dancer; singer
- Years active: 2009–present
- Spouse: Jeong Dam (m. 2022)
- Children: 1
- Dancing career
- Current group: HolyBang; Bumsup
- Former groups: Soul Sisterz; Purplow
- Musical career
- Years active: 2022–present
- Label: More Vision

Korean name
- Hangul: 정하늬
- RR: Jeong Hanui
- MR: Chŏng Hani

Jeong Hanee (Korean: 정하늬; born August 26, 1987), known professionally as Honey J (허니제이), is a South Korean choreographer, dancer, and singer. She is known for her work with the crews HolyBang and BumsUp and earlier affiliations with Soul Sisterz and Purplow. She has served as a backing dancer for artists including Jay Park. Jeong competed on the dance competition series Street Woman Fighter and World of Street Woman Fighter, leading HolyBang to victory on Street Woman Fighter in 2021. In May 2022, she signed as the first artist to Jay Park's label More Vision and released the single "Look".

== Early life and education ==
Jeong Hanee was born on August 26, 1987, in Cheongju, South Korea. Her parents divorced when she was eight, after which she spent a year living with her father. Her mother, Jang Hyun‑sook, lived separately about ten minutes away and struggled with depression due to being a housewife with no income. Following an day in which Jeong's father and aunt returned home late, Jeong left a note for her father and traveled with her younger sibling to live with their mother when she was in second grade of elementary school.

Jeong began studying dance as a child at a neighborhood jazz academy while in middle school, developing her skills and winning a competition award. She continued dancing through middle and high school, forming the group Rahe with friends and remaining active with them until college. While in high school, she saw a performance by Soul Sisterz, which inspired her to pursue dance full time and to join the group. She attended and graduated from the Paekche Institute of the Arts with an associate degree in practical dance.

== Dance career ==
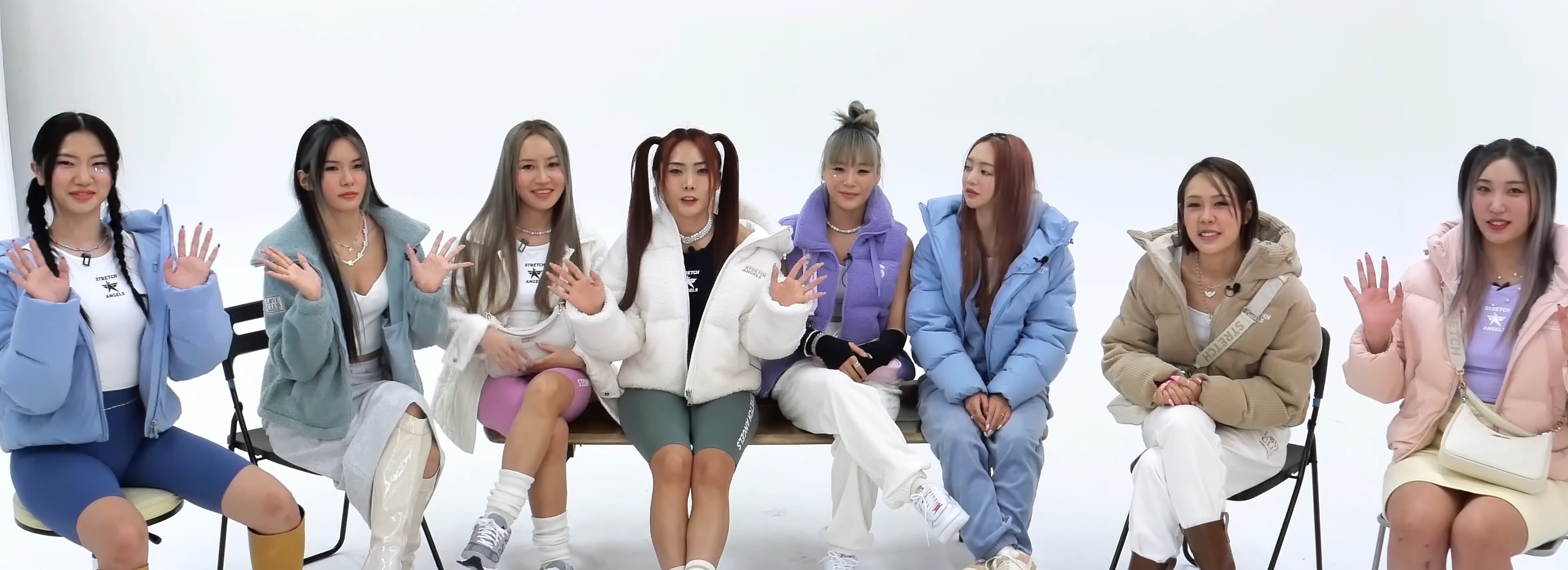
Honey J (fourth from left) with other members of HolyBang in 2021.

She made her first appearance with Soul Sisterz at the 2009 Gyeongpo Dance Festival as the group's youngest member, performing waacking. In 2011, Jeong formed the dance crew Purplow and was put in charge of artist choreography at AOMG. During her time with Purplow, she became friends with rapper Jay Park, with Jeong participating in a choreography video for Park's "Me Like Yuh". Purplow collaborated with artists including Mad Clown, Hyolyn, and Hyoyeon. She later departed Purplow and formed the hip‑hop-focused dance crew HolyBang in September 2017. She continued to perform alongside Park, appearing at the 2018 Grand Mint Festival and the 2019 Waterbomb festival.

Jeong and the other members of HolyBang competed on the dance competition series Street Woman Fighter in August 2021, joining seven other crews. HolyBang won the competition in October 2021, defeating runner‑up Hook and fellow finalists Lachica and Coca N'Butter; the crew received ₩50 million, a trophy, and an opportunity to sign an advertising contract with a global beer brand, in which they signed with Budweiser. After her win, Park asked that she not join his backing dance crew, expressing a desire for her to pursue an independent career; they did not perform together onstage until 2024, when they both appeared at the Waterbomb festival.

In May 2022, Jeong signed with More Vision, a label founded by Jay Park. Jeong was the first artist signed to More Vision and released the songs "Look" and "Honey Drop", collaborating with producers Blase and Bronze and featuring artist Lil Cherry. Jeong formed a new dance crew, Bumsup, to compete in the third season of the Street Woman Fighter series, World of Street Woman Fighter in 2025, alongside fellow alumni Aiki and Leejung Lee. Their performance amassed nearly 16 million views, described by The Korea Times as the most ever across the Street Woman Fighter franchise. During filming, Jeong and Aiki drew criticism for making inappropriate remarks towards another team, with both issuing apologies for the remarks. The team was eliminated in the eighth episode, finishing behind Motiv, AG Squad, and Osaka Ojo Gang.

== Other ventures ==
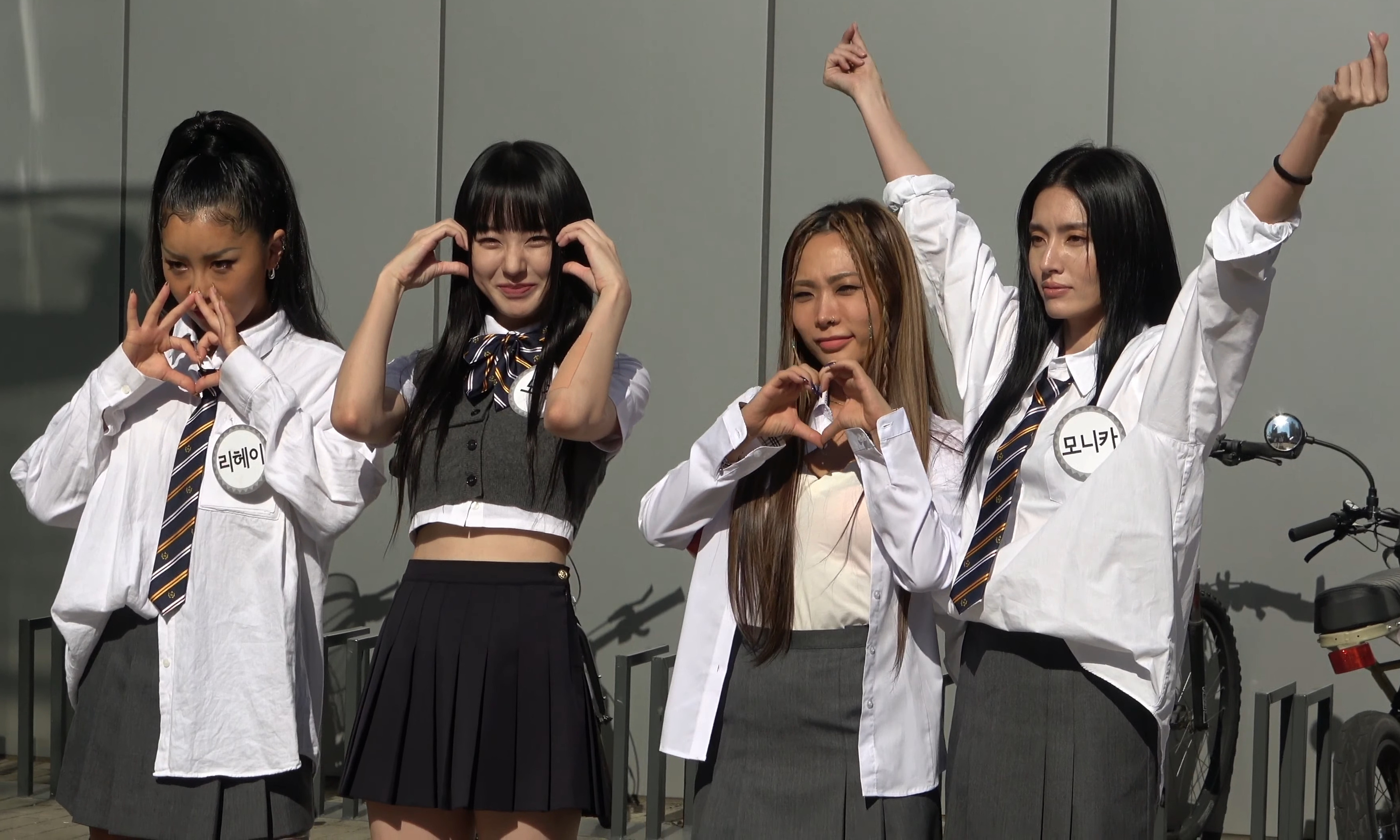
Honey J (second from right) with dancers Ri.Hey, No:ze, and Monika in 2021.

=== Public image and endorsements ===
Jeong has been described by the South China Morning Post as "one of the most respected and experienced dancers in South Korea", with writer Ben Chin noting her preference for "midriff-baring outfits with hip-hop flair". She serves as an ambassador for fashion retailer Han Style, which stocks brands such as Off‑White and JW Anderson, and appeared in a pictorial for Playboy Korea in 2017.

She is a professor of practical dance at the Korea Art Conservatory and at Kyung Hee University. Previously she taught at Hanlim Arts School, where she instructed Noh Jihye, later known as No:ze, who went on to join Jeong's dance group BumsUp. In a 2021 episode of I Live Alone, she revealed plans to launch her own brand to secure a more stable income during the COVID‑19 pandemic.

== Personal life ==
In September 2022, Jeong announced that she was pregnant and engaged to be married; the identity of her fiancé was not disclosed at the time. Following media reports alleging that her fiancé was ten years her junior, her agency More Vision issued a statement denying the claim and the article was subsequently removed. She later identified her fiancé as Jeong Dam, a model who had worked abroad; the couple married on November 18, 2022. Jeong gave birth to a daughter, Love, in April 2023.
