= Pedro Alegría =

Dominican Republic businessman and politician

Senator for the province of San José de Ocoa
- In office 16 August 2016 – 16 August 2020
- Preceded by: Carlos Castillo (Dominican Liberation Party)
- Succeeded by: José Antonio Castillo Casado (Modern Revolutionary Party)
- In office 16 August 2002 – 16 August 2010
- Preceded by: Office established
- Succeeded by: Carlos Castillo (PLD)

Personal details
- Born: 24 September 1951 (age 74) San José de Ocoa, Dominican Republic
- Party: Institutional Social Democratic Bloc (201?–present)
- Other political affiliations: Dominican Revolutionary Party (1976–201?)
- Spouse: Eva Gómez Espinal
- Children: 5 children, including actress Dalisa Alegría
- Parents: Rafael Antonio Alegría Domínguez (father); Mercedes Nidia Soto Martínez (mother)
- Profession: Businessman
- Ethnicity: White Dominican
- Net worth: ▲RD$ 511.46 million (2016)

Pedro José Alegría Soto (born 26 August 1951) is a businessman and politician from the Dominican Republic. He was Senator for the province of San José de Ocoa and was elected in 2002, and re-elected in 2006; he has also been President of Lotería Electrónica Internacional Dominicana, S.A. (LEIDSA) —the largest private Dominican lottery— since its foundation in 1997.

Alegría has a Bachelor of Business Administration.

Pedro Alegría became the first senator elected from the Institutional Social Democratic Bloc after the 2016 general election.
