= Mujeres (Mozart La Para song) =

Single by Mozart La Para with Justin Quiles
- Released: June 8, 2018
- Genre: Reggaeton
- Label: Roc Nation

"Mujeres" (Ladies) is a song by the Dominican urban artist Mozart La Para featuring Justin Quiles, released on June 8, 2018, by the Latin division of the label Roc Nation. A remix version of the song was released on November 9, 2018, featuring Farruko, Jowel & Randy. The track became one of the first to gain an international audience of the Dominican urban movement, reaching countries such as Argentina or Spain.

== Charts ==
Weekly chart performance for "Mujeres"
Chart (2018)	Peak position
Argentina (Argentina Hot 100)	56
Dominican Republic (Monitor Latino)	1
Spain (PROMUSICAE)	3
US Latin Pop Songs (Billboard)	37

=== Year-end charts ===
2018 year-end chart performance for "Mujeres"
Chart (2018)	Position
Spain (PROMUSICAE)	28
