= Bárbaro Marín =

Cuban actor (born 1961)

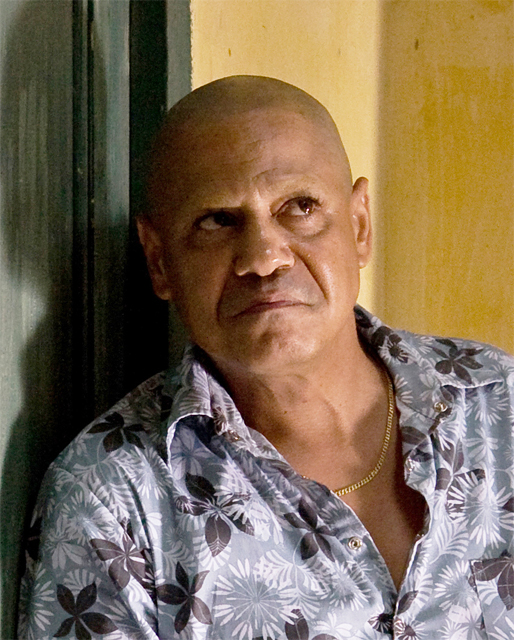
Bárbaro Marín, 2011

Bárbaro Félix Marín (born 4 March 1961, in Havana) is a Cuban actor.

He studied at the Escuela Nacional de Instructores de Arte de Cuba.

== Filmography ==
- El Tiburón, 2024 as Viktor
- Lecciones para un Beso, 2011
- El Cuerno de la Abundancia, 2008
- Música Cubana, 2003
- Aunque estés lejos, 2003
- Las Profecías de Amanda, 1998
- Doña Bárbara, 1997
- Záfiros Locura Azul, 1997
- Calor... y celos, 1996
- Tierra Índigo, 1995
- Caravana, 1989
- Asalto al Amanecer, 1987

=== Television ===
Niche 2014

- El Cartel de los Sapos 2, 2011
- Al Compás del Son, 2008
- Las Huérfanas de la Obrapía, 2000
- Andoba, 2000
- Día y Noche, 1993–1996
- Pasión y Prejuicio, 1992
- La Casa de las Flores, 1990
- Tren de Noviembre, 1986

== References and external links ==
- Bárbaro Marín at IMDb
- www.gabrielblanco.cc
