= Carlos Castillo =

Carlos Castillo may refer to:

- Carlos Castillo Armas (1914–1957), president of Guatemala
- Carlos Castillo Peraza (1947–2000), Mexican journalist and politician
- Carlos Castillo Mattasoglio (born 1950), Peruvian Catholic bishop
- Carlos Castillo (baseball) (born 1975), American retired baseball player
- Carlos Castillo (Colombian footballer) (born 1975)
- Carlos Castillo (Guatemalan footballer) (born 1977)
- Carlos Aitor Castillo (1913–2000), Peruvian painter, educator

== See also ==
- Carlos Castillo-Chavez (born 1951 or 1952), American mathematician
