= Rancho Arriba =

Coordinates: 18.71466°N 70.46179°W

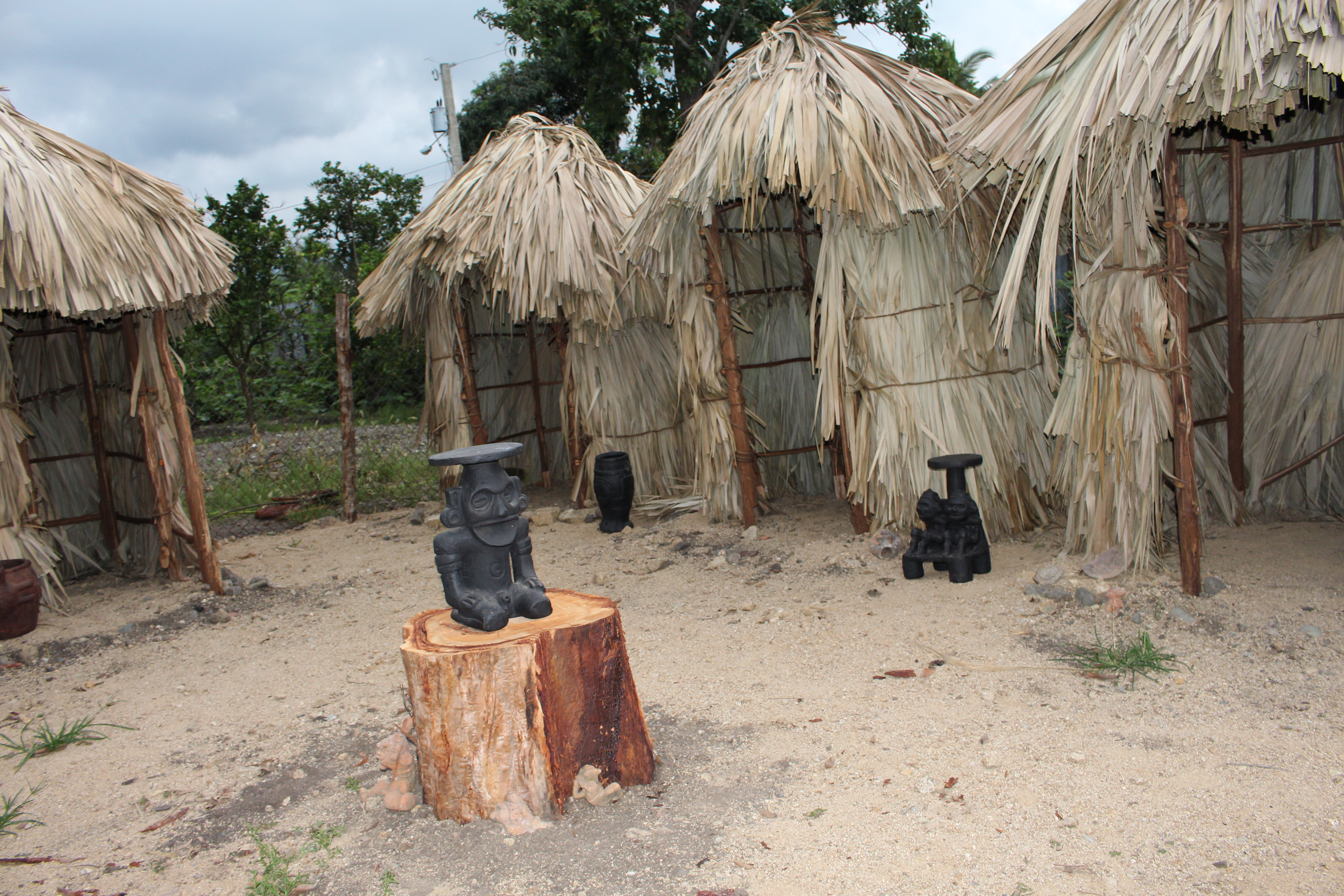
- Tourist attraction in Rancho Arriba, a town in San José de Ocoa, Dominican Republic
- Interactive map of Rancho Arriba
- Country: Dominican Republic
- Province: San José de Ocoa

Area
  - Total: 203.53 km^{2} (78.58 sq mi)

Population (2012)
  - Total: 12,586
  - Density: 61.839/km^{2} (160.16/sq mi)

Rancho Arriba is a town in the San José de Ocoa province of the Dominican Republic.

== Climate ==
Climate data for Rancho Arriba (1961–1990)
Month	Jan	Feb	Mar	Apr	May	Jun	Jul	Aug	Sep	Oct	Nov	Dec	Year
Record high °C (°F)	33.6 (92.5)	34.0 (93.2)	35.0 (95.0)	36.5 (97.7)	36.0 (96.8)	35.0 (95.0)	34.5 (94.1)	35.3 (95.5)	35.5 (95.9)	34.8 (94.6)	36.6 (97.9)	33.8 (92.8)	36.6 (97.9)
Mean daily maximum °C (°F)	26.8 (80.2)	27.4 (81.3)	28.1 (82.6)	28.3 (82.9)	29.2 (84.6)	29.9 (85.8)	30.0 (86.0)	30.3 (86.5)	30.6 (87.1)	29.8 (85.6)	28.3 (82.9)	26.6 (79.9)	28.8 (83.8)
Mean daily minimum °C (°F)	11.9 (53.4)	11.9 (53.4)	12.9 (55.2)	14.0 (57.2)	15.3 (59.5)	15.6 (60.1)	15.8 (60.4)	15.6 (60.1)	15.0 (59.0)	14.6 (58.3)	13.8 (56.8)	12.0 (53.6)	14.0 (57.2)
Record low °C (°F)	3.5 (38.3)	4.0 (39.2)	5.0 (41.0)	7.4 (45.3)	9.0 (48.2)	8.0 (46.4)	7.0 (44.6)	9.1 (48.4)	7.5 (45.5)	8.0 (46.4)	7.3 (45.1)	4.2 (39.6)	3.5 (38.3)
Average rainfall mm (inches)	77.8 (3.06)	64.8 (2.55)	87.5 (3.44)	114.5 (4.51)	189.3 (7.45)	142.4 (5.61)	137.2 (5.40)	174.6 (6.87)	138.5 (5.45)	156.1 (6.15)	133.6 (5.26)	114.5 (4.51)	1,530.8 (60.27)
Average rainy days (≥ 1.0 mm)	10.0	7.2	9.4	9.9	12.5	10.3	12.2	12.5	10.9	13.1	11.6	10.2	129.8
Source: NOAA

== Sources ==
- – World-Gazetteer.com
