= Lngshot =

South Korean boy band

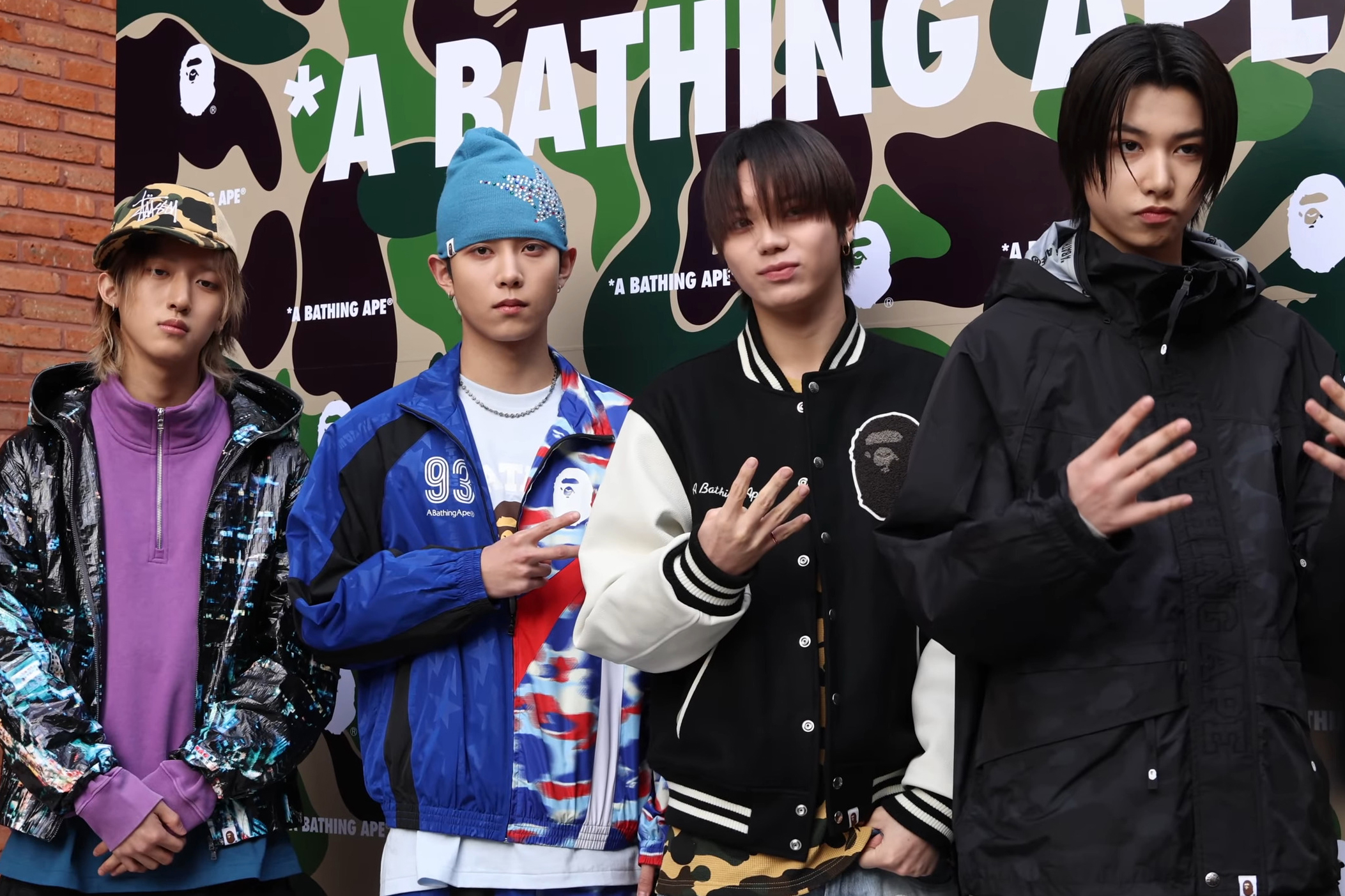
- Lngshot in 2026; L–R: Woojin, Ryul, Ohyul, and Louis

Background information
- Origin: Seoul, South Korea
- Genres: K-pop; hip-hop; R&B
- Years active: 2025–present
- Label: More Vision
- Members: Louis; Woojin; Ryul; Ohyul
- Website: lngshot4sho.com

Lngshot (Korean: 롱샷; RR: Rongsyat; pronounced "long shot", stylized in all caps) is a South Korean boy band formed in 2025. The band consists of Ohyul, Ryul, Woojin, and Louis. It is the first boy band formed and managed by More Vision, the record label founded by American-Korean rapper Jay Park. They debuted on January 13, 2026 with the single "Moonwalkin'", the lead single of their first extended play (EP) Shot Callers

== Name ==
The name comes from the phrase "long shot" meaning something with a low probability of success. Woojin told The Korea Times that the name initially felt unfamiliar because the term is not commonly used in Korea, but he later accepted it, realizing that no alternative word captured the same meaning.

== History ==
=== 2025: Pre-debut and "Saucin'" ===
Lngshot was formed by American - Korean rapper Jay Park under his record label More Vision, with Park saying he wanted to assemble a group built around people who shared his mindset. In August 2025, Park performed at a Hanyang University festival, where Lngshot made a surprise appearance and showcased a then‑unreleased song. Throughout the month he gradually revealed the members' names, released teasers of their song, and shared photos of the members with their faces obscured. A month later, Park posted a photo of the band giving the middle finger to the camera, prompting criticism of their concept and for the gesture.

In November 2025, Lngshot released the mixtape 4shoboiz Mixtape and followed with their pre‑debut single "Saucin'" the next month. The "Saucin'" music video featured Jay Park parodying a CEO who humorously scolds the group for their middle‑finger photo, satirizing earlier criticisms. They performed at the 2025 Melon Music Awards alongside Jay Park and artists from H1ghr Music. Louis was featured on the "Lullaby Remix" by American singer JD McCrary, which also included Jay Park and Paradise.

=== 2026: Debut and Shot Callers ===
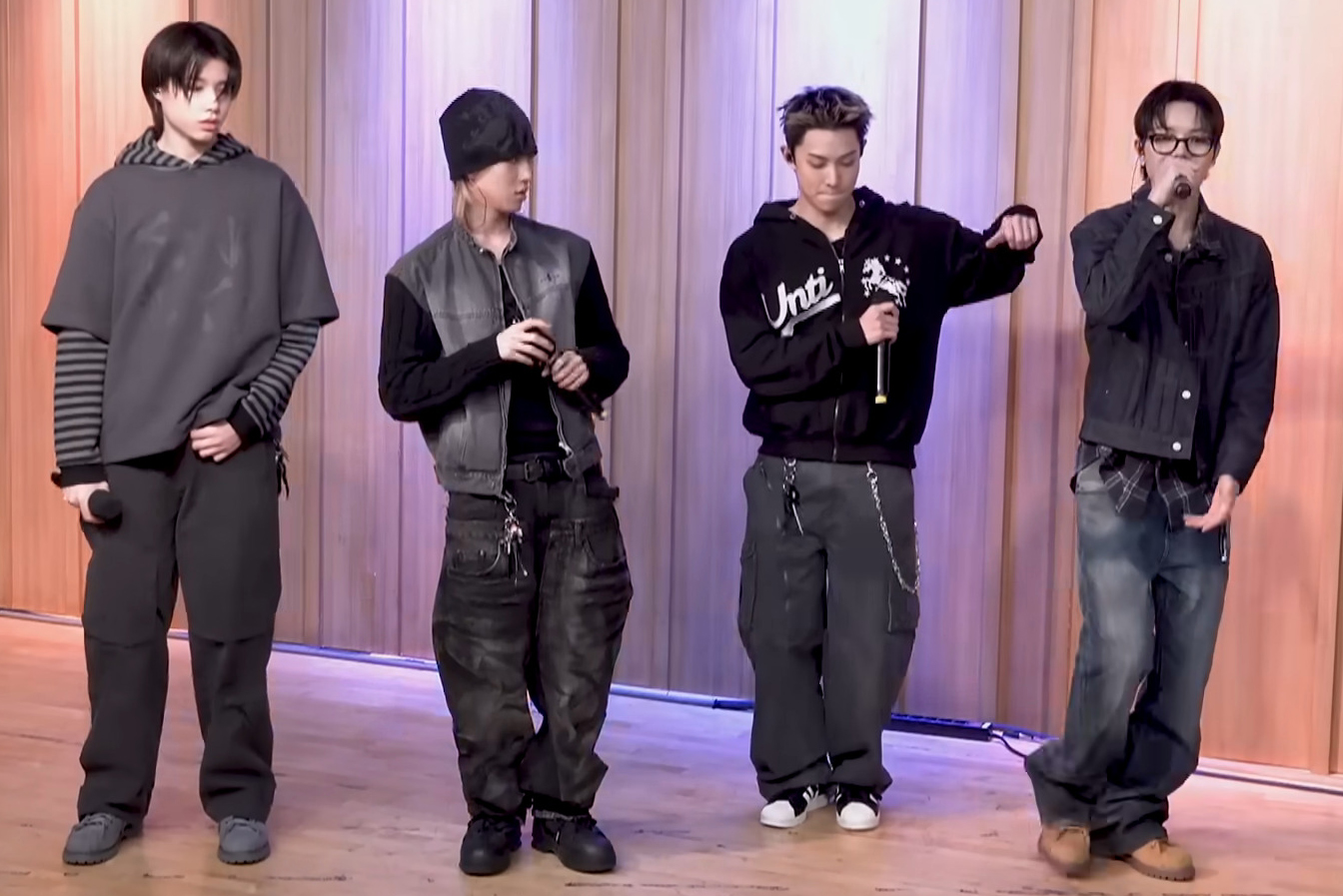
Lngshot performing their debut single, "Moonwalkin'", on SBS Power FM, 2026.

On January 13, 2026, Lngshot released their debut single "Moonwalkin'" and the extended play Shot Callers, and performed "Moonwalkin'" and "Saucin'" on the Mnet music program M Countdown. "Moonwalkin'" was the first song the group recorded, originally intended for Woojin as a solo artist, and references American singers Michael Jackson and Beyoncé.

On January 27, the group released the music video for "FaceTime," featuring the members dancing alongside trainees from a girl group under More Vision. The video and subsequent performance with the trainees prompted fan criticism and led some Chinese and Korean fans to send protest trucks to More Vision's offices, while others criticized the protests as excessive.

Lngshot was named Billboard Korea's February 2026 Rookie of the Month. They released the EP Training Day on March 23, 2026, comprising five tracks recorded during their trainee period and promoted it with social media clips from that time. In May 2026, More Vision announced that Lngshot would release a collaboration with Jay Park on the mixtape 4shoboiz Vol. 2: 4shoville. They released the song "4sho 4sho" on May 11, along with an accompanying music video. They later released the song "Yeah! Yeah!" on May 15, before releasing the mixtape on May 18. The music video for "Moya" was released on May 23, featuring footage from their win at the 2026 Weibo International Entertainment Awards in April, while the music video for "Run It Up" was released on May 29 and was created using 2D animation. They later contributed to the soundtrack of the Anderson .Paak film K-Pops! with the song "Fire with Fire."

In June 2026, Jay Park was criticized for being too involved with Lngshot after performances in which he was positioned in the center, with Park posting sarcastic remarks about joining as an official member and pushing back against the criticism. That same month, they were announced as headliners for the NBA Rising Stars Invitational at The Kallang in Kallang, Singapore on June 28. Lngshot and Park appeared on On the Radar Radio on June 14, 2026, performing “Gukbbong.” Lngshot won the KM Chart Awards for Global Rising Star and New Artist, the latter alongside Alpha Drive One, on July 24, 2026. In early October 2026, Lngshot announced that their next EP, S.W.I.S.H., would be released on November 10, and released the track "Masterpiece" with a music video on October 21. They were selected for promotion in North America through a joint project between Kakao Entertainment and Atlantic Music Group, making them the first K-pop act to participate, before the EP's release.

== Artistry ==
Lngshot's musical style has been described as K-pop, hip-hop, and R&B. Jay Park described the group's vision as one that "chases what it loves first and lets authenticity win over the crowd." Their performance of "Moonwalkin'" was noted by The Korea Times for avoiding "sounding too derivative, a common pitfall for some hip-hop-leaning K-pop acts, instead presenting an identity grounded in talent". More Vision described the band as aiming to become "one of the most influential acts in pop music." The group's musical identity and social media content were described by The Korea Herald as featuring a "hip-hop-based sound and unorthodox member dynamics" that defied prevailing K-pop trends, with the publication naming them, alongside Hybe boy band Cortis, as among the acts redefining creativity within the industry.

== Members ==
- Ohyul (오율) – leader
- Ryul (률)
- Woojin (우진)
- Louis (루이)

== Discography ==
=== Extended plays ===
List of extended plays, showing selected details, selected chart positions, and sales figures
Title	Details	Peak chart positions		Sales
Title	Details	KOR	JPN	Sales
Shot Callers	Released: January 13, 2026; Labels: More Vision; Formats: CD, digital download, streaming	3	28	KOR: 166,451; JPN: 1,390
Training Day	Released: March 23, 2026; Labels: More Vision; Formats: CD, digital download, streaming	10	—	KOR: 30,000
S.W.I.S.H.	Released: November 10, 2026; Labels: More Vision; Formats: CD, digital download, streaming	4	—	KOR: 377,062
"—" denotes releases that did not chart or were not released in that region.

=== Mixtapes ===
List of mixtapes, showing selected details, selected chart positions, and sales figures
Title	Details	Peak chart positions	Sales
Title	Details	KOR	Sales
4shoboiz Mixtape	Released: November 5, 2025; Labels: More Vision; Formats: Digital download, streaming	—	
4shoboiz Vol. 2: 4shoville (with Jay Park)	Released: May 18, 2026; Labels: More Vision; Formats: CD, digital download, streaming	7	KOR: 107,930
"—" denotes releases that did not chart or were not released in that region.

=== Singles ===
List of singles, with selected chart positions, showing year released and album name
Title	Year	Peak chart positions								Album
Title	Year	KOR	MYS	NZ Hot	SGP	TWN	US Pop	VIE Hot	WW Excl. US	Album
"Saucin'"	2025	—	—	—	—	—	—	—	—	Shot Callers
"Moonwalkin'"	2026	109	10	13	16	5	38	39	180	Shot Callers
"—" denotes releases that did not chart or were not released in that region.

=== Soundtrack appearances ===
List of soundtrack appearances, showing year released, and name of the album
Title	Year	Album
"Fire with Fire"	2026	K-Pops! OST

=== Other charted songs ===
List of other charted songs, with selected chart positions, showing year released and album name
Title	Year	Peak chart positions			Album
Title	Year	KOR	SGP Reg.	TWN	Album
"Never Let Go"	2026	—	16	17	Shot Callers
"Vanilla Days"	2026	— (Note: "Vanilla Days" did not enter the Circle Digital Chart, but peaked at number 64 on the component Download Chart.)	—	—	Training Day
"Yeah! Yeah!" (with Jay Park)	2026	— (Note: "Yeah! Yeah!" did not enter the Circle Digital Chart, but peaked at number 154 on the component Download Chart.)	—	—	4shoboiz Vol. 2: 4shoville
"—" denotes releases that did not chart or were not released in that region.

== Awards and nominations ==
Name of the award ceremony, year presented, category, nominee(s) of the award, and the result of the nomination
Award ceremony	Year	Category	Nominee(s)	Result	Ref.
Berlin Music Video Awards	2026	Best VFX	"Saucin'"	Nominated	
Brand Customer Loyalty Awards	2026	Male Idol (Rookie)	Lngshot	Won	
KM Chart Awards	2026	Global Rising Star	Lngshot	Won	
KM Chart Awards	2026	New Artist	Lngshot	Won	
Melon Music Awards	2026	Best New Artist	Lngshot	Won	
Weibo International Entertainment Awards	2026	New Overseas Group	Lngshot	Won	
