= More Vision =

South Korean entertainment company

- Native name: 모어비전
- Type: Private
- Industry: Entertainment
- Genre: K-pop; pop; dance; R&B; hip hop
- Founded: March 3, 2022; 4 years ago
- Founder: Jay Park
- Headquarters: Gangnam, Seoul, South Korea
- Key people: Jay Park (CEO)
- Owner: Jay Park
- Website: morevision.kr

More Vision Co., Ltd. (Korean: 모어비전) is a South Korean entertainment company established in 2022 by American rapper Jay Park. The label manages Honey J, the boy band Lngshot, and the dance groups HolyBang and More Vision Project. It previously managed musicians Jessi and Chung Ha prior to their departure.

== History ==
More Vision was founded on March 3, 2022, by American rapper Jay Park. Its launch included the debut of the label's YouTube channel and the release of an introductory video, "More Love, More Laughter, More Vision," which outlined Park's mission for the company. The label was established after Park stepped down as CEO of AOMG and H1ghr Music and amid reports that he planned to debut his own K‑pop boy group. Kakao Entertainment acquired a 20% stake in the label in June 2022, stating that it would form a business partnership while allowing More Vision to remain as an independent company. During its first year, the label signed dancer Honey J, leader of the dance group HolyBang, as she debuted as a singer, and later signed the remaining HolyBang members as well as the dance collective More Vision Project, formed by Park in February.

In April 2023, American musician Jessi signed with the label after departing P Nation the previous year, releasing her first single under the label, "Gum", on October 25. In December of that year, South Korean outlet The Fact reported that More Vision was considering terminating her contract after allegedly canceling her October 27 appearance on the chart show Music Bank, with the claims being denied by both Jessi and Jay Park. However, on January 31, 2024, the label announced that they had mutually agreed to terminate their contract.

On October 10, 2023, it was announced that South Korean singer Chung Ha had signed with More Vision. She had her first release with the label, Eenie Meenie, on March 11, 2024, featuring tracks such as the title single "Eenie Meenie" with Hongjoong of Ateez and "I'm Ready". She released the extended play Alivio on February 12, 2025, and on February 9, 2026, teased the release of a new single through the label.

In October 2024, Park told The Hollywood Reporter that the label was developing both a boy band and a girl group, with debuts planned for early 2026. In August 2025, More Vision introduced its first K‑pop boy band, Lngshot, with a surprise appearance during Jay Park's performance at the Hanyang University festival. The group released the pre‑debut single "Saucin'" in December 2025 and officially debuted on January 13, 2026, with the single "Moonwalkin'" and their extended play Shot Callers. In February 2026, More Vision entered a strategic partnership with the entertainment company Transparent Arts to collaborate on international business strategy and global development. On September 14, 2026, More Vision announced that Chung Ha would be leaving the label on September 21.

== Artists ==
=== Recording artists ===
Groups

- Lngshot

Soloists

- Honey J
- Jay Park

Dance crews

- HolyBang
- More Vision Project

== Former artists ==
Soloists

- Jessi (2023–2024)
- Chung Ha (2023–2026)
