= Mozart La Para =

Dominican rapper (born 1988)

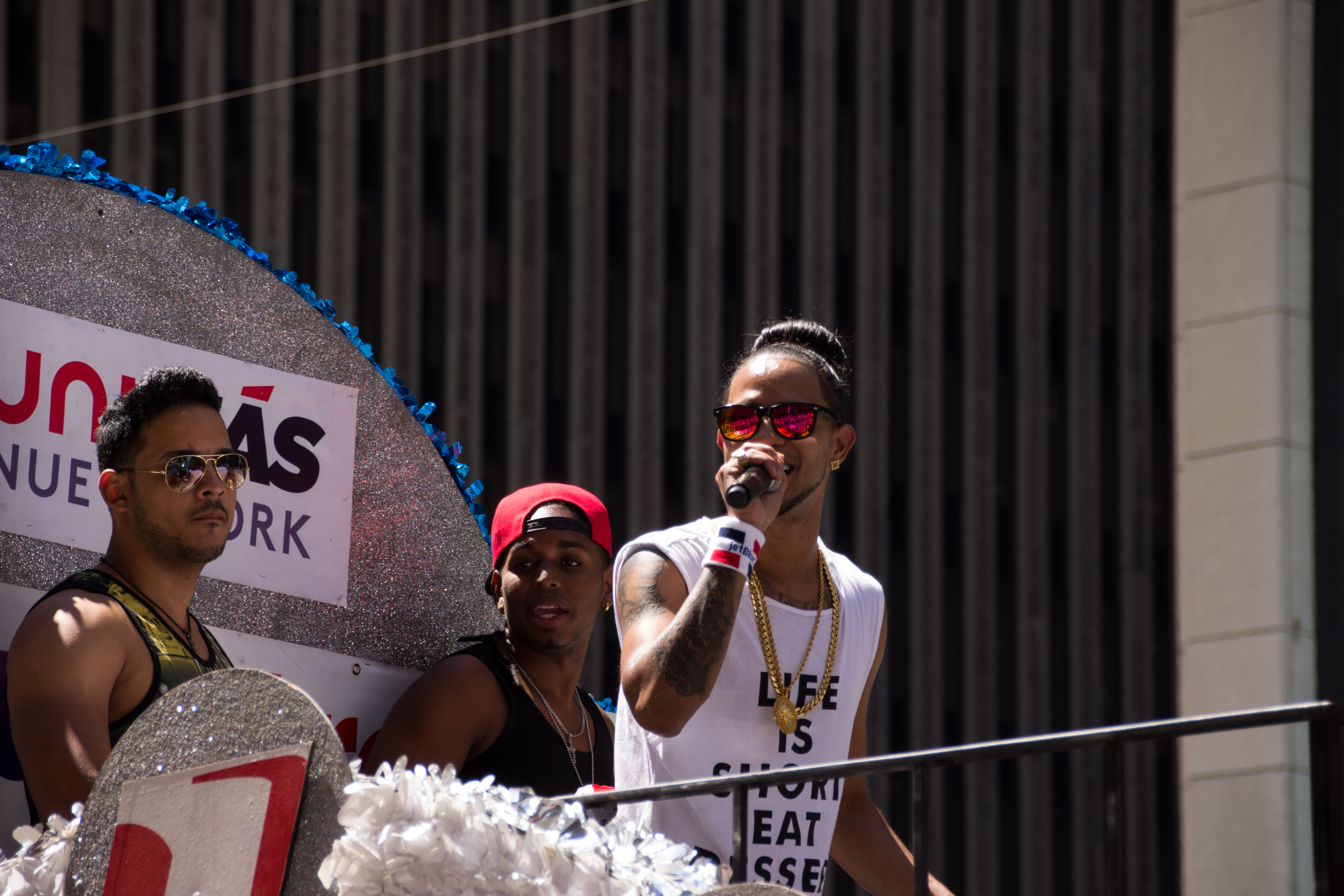

Background information
- Born: Erickson Rafael Fernández Paniagua; January 31, 1988 (age 38); Los Mina, Dominican Republic
- Genres: Hip hop; Latin trap; reggaeton
- Occupations: Rapper; singer
- Instruments: Vocals
- Years active: 2002–present
- Label: Roc Nation
- Website: mozartlapara.net
- Spouse(s): Alexandra Hatcu (m. 2009; div. 2019) Dalisa Alegría (m. 2021)
- Children: 1
- Relatives: Pedro Alegría (father-in-law)

Erickson Rafael Fernández Paniagua (born January 31, 1988), known by the stage name Mozart La Para, is a Dominican rapper and singer who has had songs in the charts five times.

== Early life ==
Fernández was born in Los Mina, Santo Domingo, Dominican Republic.

== Career ==
In 2016, he signed to Roc Nation, becoming the first artist to be signed to that label's Latin division. Prior to signing with Roc Nation, Fernández had been a musician for 15 years, releasing numerous hits that made it to Billboard's Tropical Songs chart. He was also the subject of Pueto Pa' Mi, a 2015 film based on his life.

== Discography ==
=== Singles ===
| Year | Single | Peak chart positions | | | |
| Year | Single | US Tropical | US Rhythm | US LATIN POP | SPAIN |
|---|---|---|---|---|---|
| 2012 | Si Te Pego Cuerno (Featuring Farruko) | | | | |
| 2013 | I Wanna Get High | 25 | | 31 | |
| 2014 | Pa' Goza | 37 | 42 | 35 | 45 |
| 2015 | No Me Pelee | | | | |
| 2015 | Levantate | | | | |
| 2015 | Llegan Los Montros Men (Featuring Shelow Shaq) | 12 | 12 | | |
| 2016 | Toy enamorado (Featuring Sharlene & Nacho) | 1 | 25 | | |
| 2017 | Fiesta y Vacilon | | | | |
| 2017 | Bye Bye (Feat. Liro Shaq y Chimbala) | | | | |
| 2018 | Mujeres (Featuring Justin Quiles) | | | 37 | 3 |
"—" denotes releases that did not chart.

=== As featured performer ===
- Toy Enamorao (2015) charted at #1 on Tropical Songs
- Mujeres (2018) -- Peaked at #3 on Productores de Música de España chart.

== Personal life ==
Fernández was married to Romanian-Italian real estate businesswoman Alexandra Hatcu, and together they have a daughter, Charlotte (born 2013).

The couple announced on March 26, 2019, after 10 years of marriage, that they were divorcing.
