= Stinger (disambiguation) =

A stinger is an organ or body part found in various animals, typically arthropods, that usually delivers some kind of venom.

Stinger may also refer to:

== Military and transport ==
- A type of military camouflage with a primarily yellow base
- A brand of radar detector/LIDAR detector
- Operation Stinger, a military operation during the Croatian War of Independence

=== Aircraft ===
- The AC-119K version of Fairchild AC-119 gunship was nicknamed Stinger
- Preceptor Stinger, an American single-seat parasol-wing ultralight design
- Rans S-17 Stinger, an American single-seat ultralight design
- Rans S-18 Stinger II, an American two-seat ultralight design
- Williams W-17 Stinger, an American racing aircraft design

=== Automobiles ===
- Kia Stinger, a sport sedan
- Pacer Stinger, a 1976 show car by American Motors
- Stinger (law enforcement), a bait car system developed by BSM Wireless
- Police slang for a spike strip, a device used in pursuits to deflate vehicle tires

=== Ships ===
- USS Stinger (SP-1252), a United States Navy patrol boat in commission from 1917 to 1919
- Stinger, an extension over board the stern of an offshore pipe lay barge used to provide additional support at the over bend of an S-lay during offshore construction

=== Weapons ===
- FIM-92 Stinger, a surface-to-air missile
- Air-to-Air Stinger, derived from the FIM-92
- M2 Stinger, a USMC field modification of the .30 AN/M2 Browning machine gun variant
- Stinger grenade or sting grenade, a type of hand grenade
- Stinger round, a type of specialty ammunition for shotguns
- Stinger, a series of airsoft guns manufactured by Crosman

== Sports ==
- Edmonton Stingers, a professional basketball team in Canada
- Salt Lake Stingers, former name of the Salt Lake Bees Minor League Baseball team
- "Stinger", a nickname for American professional wrestler Steve Borden aka Sting
- Stinger, is a mascot name for teams such as the Columbus Blue Jackets and Baldwin Wallace University
- Stinger, in golf terminology, a type of shot

== Entertainment ==
- Stinger (comics), any of several comic book characters named Stinger
- Stinger, a 1988 science fiction horror novel by Robert R. McCammon
- Stingers (TV series) (1998–2004) Australian police drama television series
- Stinger (radio), a short sound clip used to divide sections of a radio program or podcast, also known as a sounder
- Stinger (filmmaking), film industry slang for a post-credits scene
- Stinger (arcade game), a 1983 arcade shoot 'em up by Seibu Denshi
- Moero TwinBee: Cinnamon-hakase o Sukue!, a 1986 Family Computer game that was released in 1987 for the Nintendo Entertainment System under the title of Stinger
- Stinger (Dorney Park), a defunct roller coaster in Allentown, Pennsylvania, US
- Stinger, a final note used at the end of some American march music
- Stinger, a man-made Transformer from Transformers: Age of Extinction
- Stinger Guitars, made by C. F. Martin & Company
- The Stinger (album)

== Other ==
- Cynthia Stinger (born 1958), American handballer
- Henry J. Stinger (1857–1925), American politician
- Stinger (cocktail), a drink composed of brandy and white creme de menthe
- Stinger (sculpture), an outdoor work by Tony Smith in Seattle, Washington, US
- Stinger (medicine), a minor neurological injury suffered by athletes
- Stinger, the conductor with higher voltage to neutral than the other two conductors in a high-leg delta three-phase electric power system

== See also ==
- Sting (disambiguation)
- Stung (disambiguation)
