= The Stinger =

The Stinger may refer to:

- The Stinger (newspaper), a student newspaper at University of Wisconsin–Superior
- The Stinger (album), a 1965 album by Johnny "Hammond" Smith

== See also ==
- Stinger (disambiguation)
