= AMC Pacer =

Compact car produced by American Motors Corporation

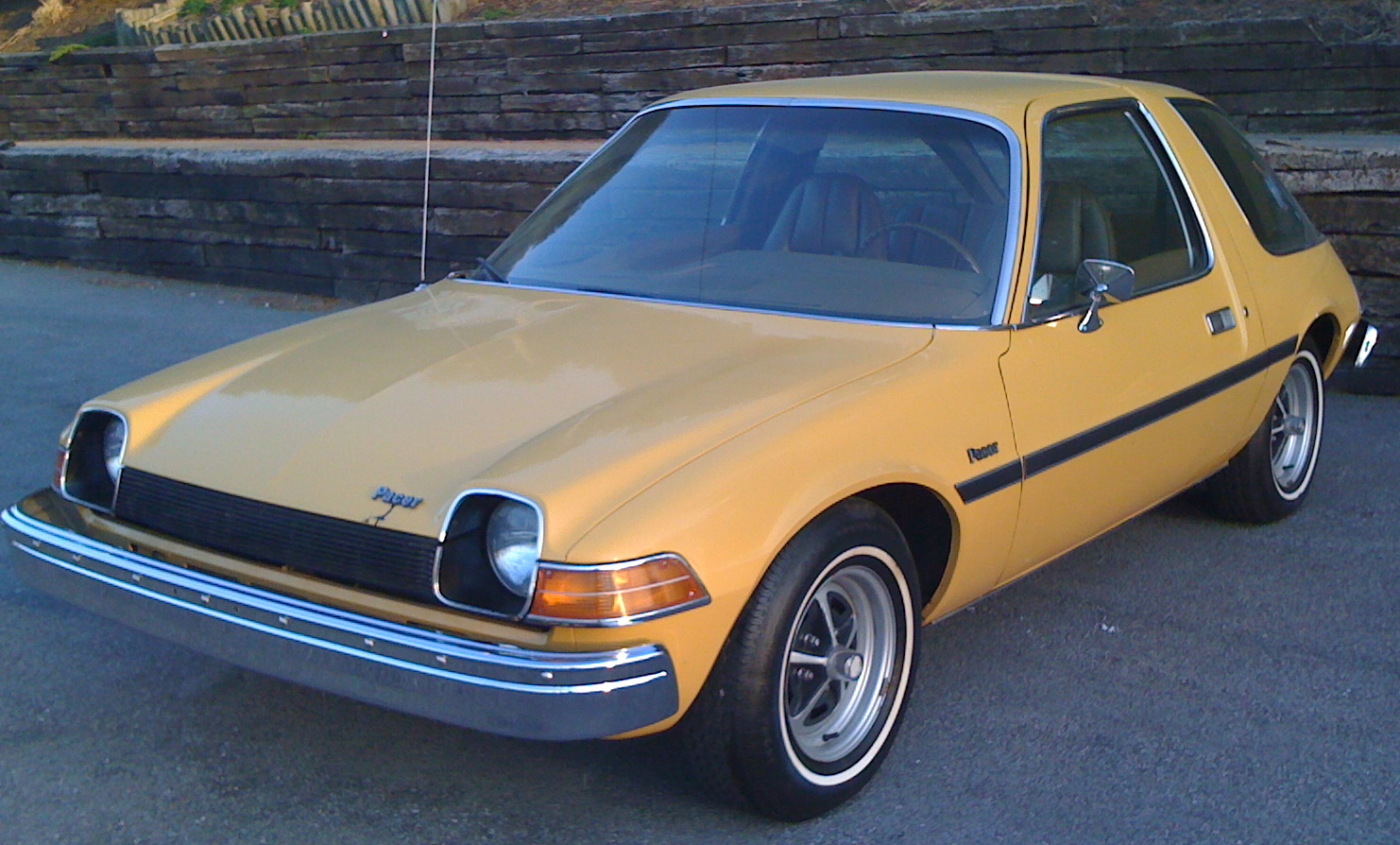
- 1975 AMC Pacer base model hatchback coupe

Overview
- Manufacturer: American Motors Corporation (AMC)
- Also called: VAM Pacer (Mexico)
- Production: 13 January 1975 – 3 December 1979
- Model years: 1975–1980
- Assembly: United States: Kenosha, Wisconsin (Kenosha Engine); Mexico: Mexico City (VAM)
- Designer: Dick Teague

Body and chassis
- Class: Compact car
- Body style: 2-door hatchback coupe 2-door station wagon
- Layout: FR layout

Powertrain
- Engine: 232 cu in (3.8 L) I6; 258 cu in (4.2 L) I6; 282 cu in (4.6 L) I6 (Mexico only); 304 cu in (5.0 L) V8
- Transmission: 3-speed manual 3-speed with overdrive 4-speed manual 3-speed automatic

Dimensions
- Wheelbase: 100.0 in (2,540 mm)
- Length: 171.8 in (4,364 mm) (coupe); 176.8 in (4,491 mm) (wagon)
- Width: 77.3 in (1,963 mm)
- Height: 52.8 in (1,341 mm) (coupe)
- Curb weight: 3,000 lb (1,361 kg)

The AMC Pacer is a two-door compact car produced in the United States by American Motors Corporation (AMC) from 1975 through the 1980 model year. The Pacer was also made in Mexico by Vehículos Automotores Mexicanos (VAM) from 1976 until 1979 and positioned as a premium-priced luxury car.

Design work began in 1971. The rounded shape and large glass area were unusual compared with the three-box designs of the era. The Pacer's width is equal to full-sized domestic vehicles at the time, and AMC promoted this unique design feature as "the first wide small car". The Pacer was the first modern, mass-produced, U.S. automobile design using the cab forward concept.

Upon its introduction, reviews used descriptions such as "futuristic, bold, and unique". The Pacer featured an aerodynamic "jellybean" styling, numerous innovations such as different door lengths. This was noted "as a space-efficient car, seemingly from the future". The Pacer stood out at a time when "Detroit was still rolling out boat-sized gas guzzlers."

== History ==
=== Design ===
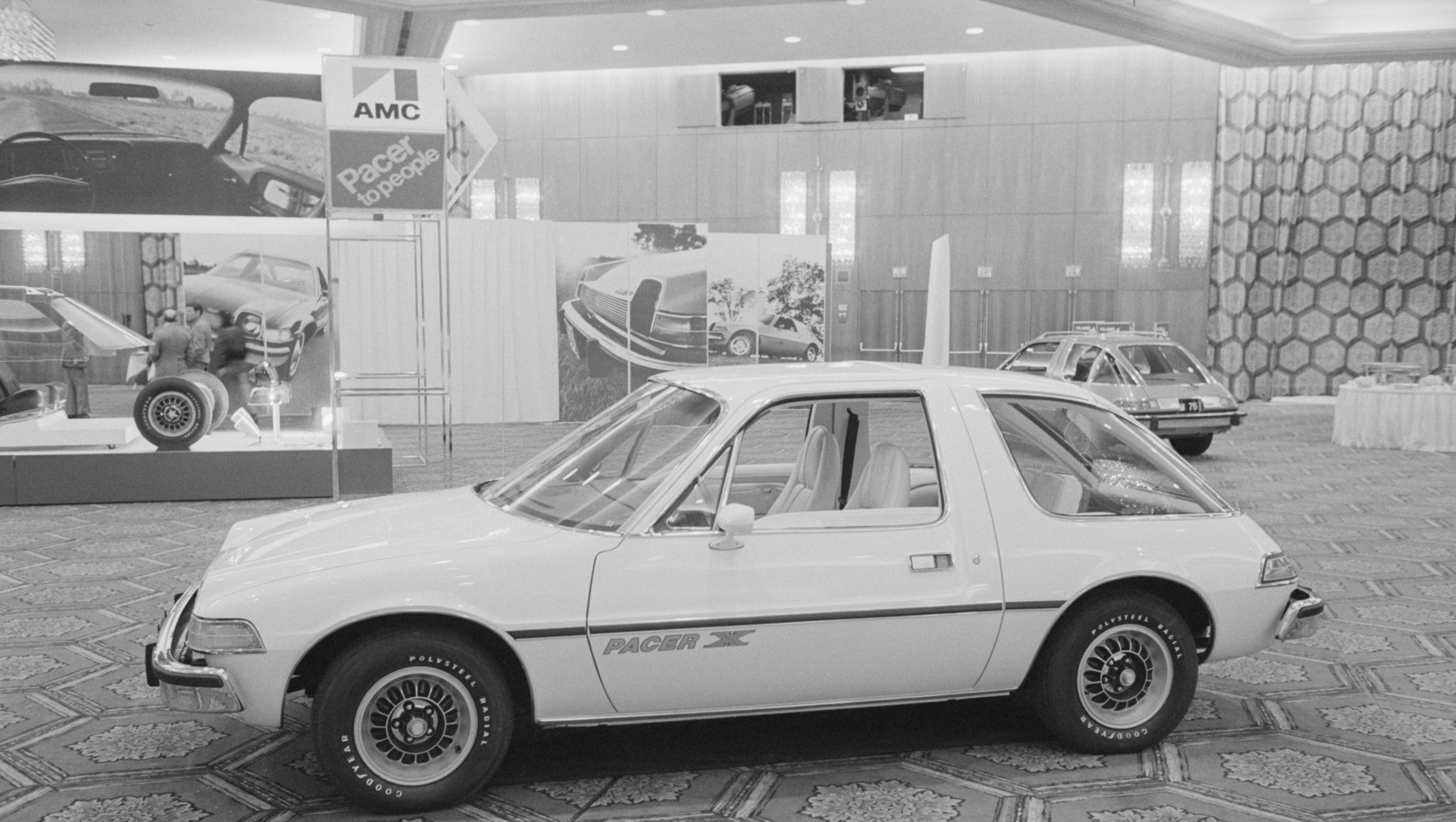
A Pacer X on display in a showroom in January 1975

American Motors' chief stylist Dick Teague began work on the Pacer in 1971, anticipating increased demand for smaller vehicles throughout the decade. The new car was designed to offer the interior room and feel of a big vehicle that drivers of traditional domestic automobiles were accustomed to, but in a much smaller, aerodynamic, and purposefully distinctive exterior package. American Motors called it "Project Amigo" as a fresh design "featuring a body style not seen before, using the latest technology and exceeding upcoming safety regulations".

Car and Driver magazine wrote, "It was the first car designed from the inside out. Four passengers were positioned with reasonable clearances, and then the rest of the car was built around them as compactly as possible." American Motors explored many unique solutions to what Teague called the "Urban Concept" car. Not only different sized doors for the driver and passenger sides were considered, but also using a Wankel engine and front-wheel-drive. The first development mule was made by shortening both the front and the rear of an AMC Matador by 30 in (762 mm).

The shape was highly rounded, with a large glass area, and was very unusual for its time. Road & Track magazine described it as "fresh, bold and functional-looking". The Pacer featured a rounded and aerodynamic "jellybean" styling The body surface was 37% glass, and its surface area of 5,615 square inches (3.6 m^{2}) was 16% more than the average passenger car at the time. The May 1976 issue of Car and Driver dubbed it "The Flying Fishbowl," and it was also described as "the seventies answer to George Jetson's mode of transportation" at a time when "Detroit was still rolling out boat-sized gas guzzlers."

Development was under Product Group Vice President Gerald C. Meyers, whose goal was to develop a unique car: "Everything that we do must distinguish itself as being importantly different than what can be expected from the competition." Even before its introduction, AMC's Board Chairman Roy D. Chapin Jr. described, "It will be a visibly different car, maybe even controversial. It's an idea that represents a transition between what has been and what's coming. Today versus tomorrow." According to Popular Mechanics, "This is the first time in the history of the American automobile industry that a car manufacturer has said in advance of bringing out a new product that some people may not like." The Pacer was in sharp contrast to the conventional boxy and rectilinear automobile body styles of the 1970s. Road and Track described the car's styling "with all those rounded corners, the lack of distinct edges, and acre upon acre of curvilinear surfaces".

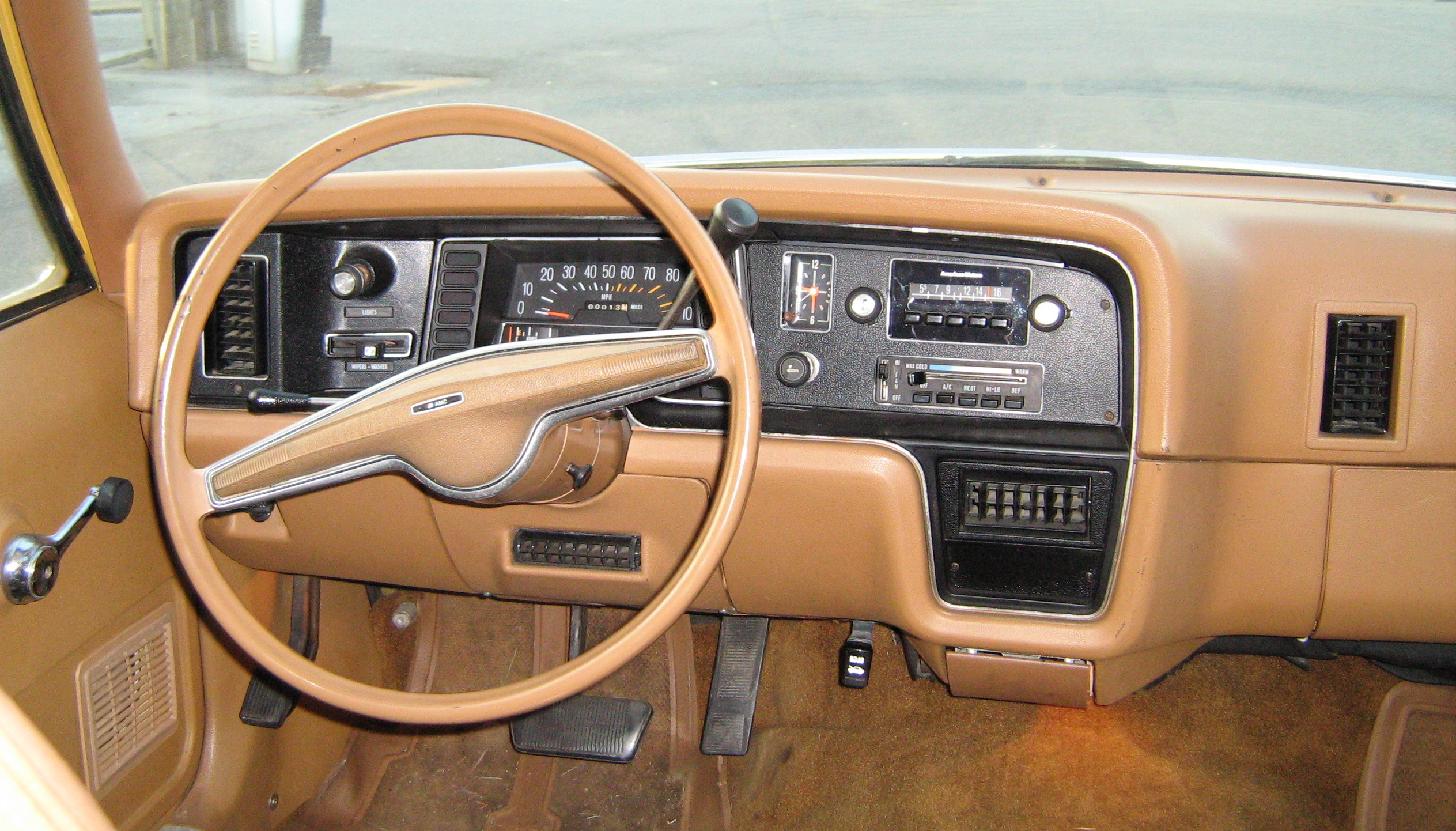
Pacer's dashboard design for safety and ease of service instrument panel

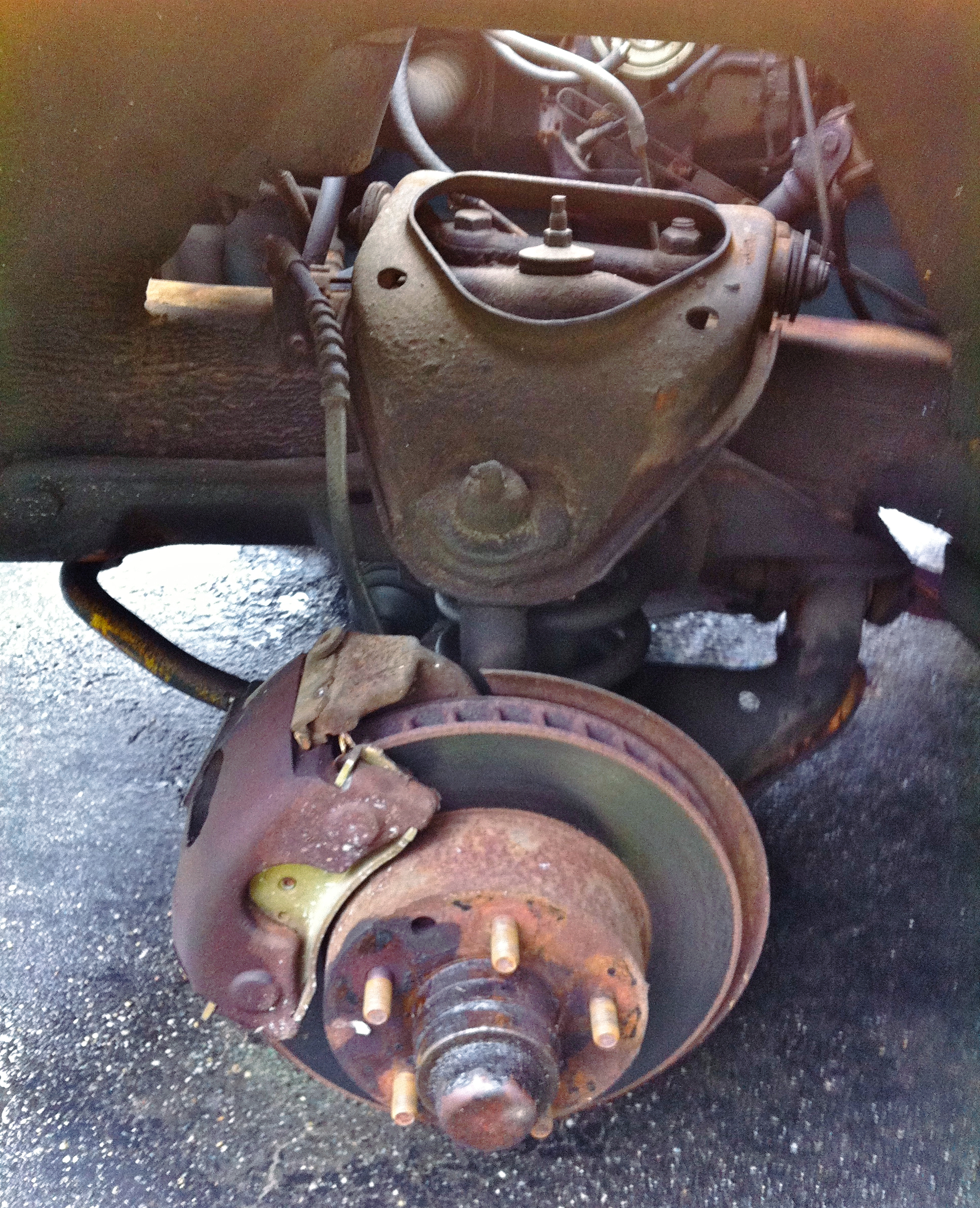
Isolated wishbone front suspension

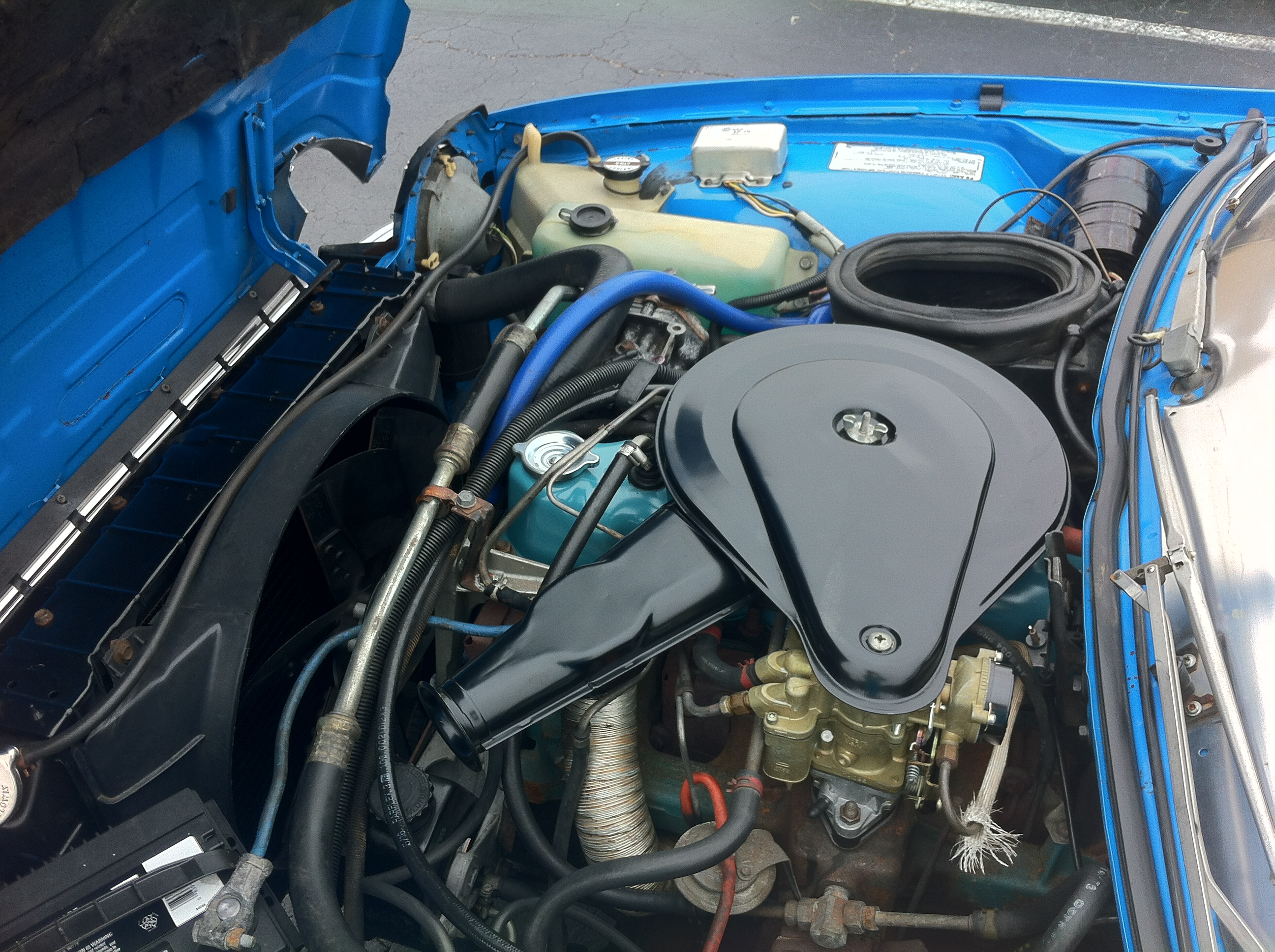
Engine bay with 258 cu in (4.2 L)

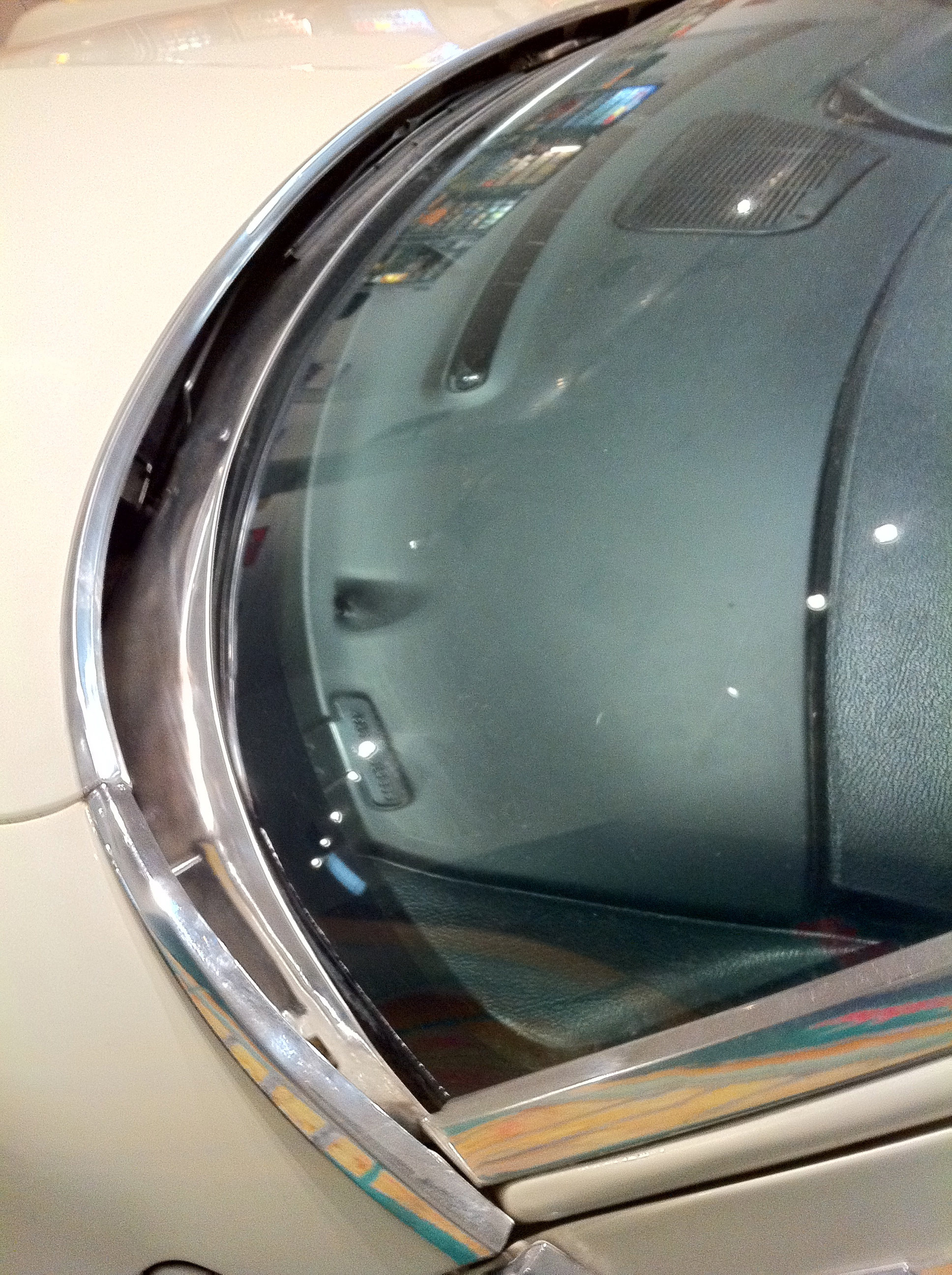
Hidden windshield wipers

American Motors explored many futuristic ideas, but the automaker needed more resources to build components from scratch. Instead, they needed to use outside suppliers or adapt existing components and parts in their production facilities. Unique for a comparatively small car, the Pacer was as wide as a full-size American car of the era. American Motors did not describe it as "cab forward". Nevertheless, the Pacer's layout included wheels pushed to the corners (short overhangs), a relatively wide body, and A-pillars moved forward. The windshield was placed over part of the engine compartment, with the bottom edge of the glass forward of the firewall. Contrary to some reports, the Pacer was not widened 6 inches (152 mm) to accommodate the rear-wheel drive configuration. The editor of Road & Track asserted that front-wheel drive, as well as a transverse mid-engined configuration, were among "various mechanical layouts ... tossed around by the idea people at AMC," adding that "it's unlikely they ever had much hope of being able to produce anything other than their traditional front engine and rear drive, using components already in production."

The introductory 1975 AMC advertising and literature proclaimed it "the first wide small car". The width was dictated partly by marketing strategy—American drivers were accustomed to large vehicles, and the Pacer's occupants had the impression of being in a larger car—and partly because AMC's assembly lines were already set up for full-size vehicles.

Teague's low-drag design was highly innovative, predating the fuel crisis and the flood of small imports into the American market. Pacer's drag coefficient of 0.43 was relatively low for that time. Teague even eliminated rain gutters, smoothly blending the tops of the doors into the roof—an aerodynamic detail that, although criticized at the time for allowing rain onto the front seat, has become the norm in today's designs.

Also unique was that the passenger-side door was 4 inches (102 mm) longer than the driver's door. This innovation made passenger egress easier, particularly from the rear seats. This innovation made it safer for passengers to use the curbside in countries that drive on the right.

Engineers also took an entirely fresh approach with the Pacer's front suspension and engine mounting. It was the first U.S. small car to isolate the engine and suspension system noises from the passenger compartment. The entire front suspension was mounted on a crossmember isolated from the frame extensions by heavy rubber bushings. It is also different from all other AMC cars, with the coil spring between the two control arms seated on the lower wishbone arm at the bottom and in the suspension/engine mount crossmember at the top. The rear suspension was also isolated, requiring a unique tool to press the one-piece bushings in and out of the mounting brackets.

Other aspects of the Pacer were designed for ease of service, including the dashboard and instrument panel, which used a minimum number of easily accessible screws and featured a removable cover/bezel that did not require disconnecting the speedometer cable, while also providing access to the instrument light bulbs. The Pacer's design was ranked to be equal with the new Aspen-Volare compacts as the most serviceable cars in the industry.

The Pacer was the second American production car, after the Ford Pinto, to feature rack-and-pinion steering. The system was mounted low at the front of the crossmember. The Pacer's body was also designed so that structural lines protected it from collision damage, and AMC engineers claimed they protected more than 50% of the car's surface.

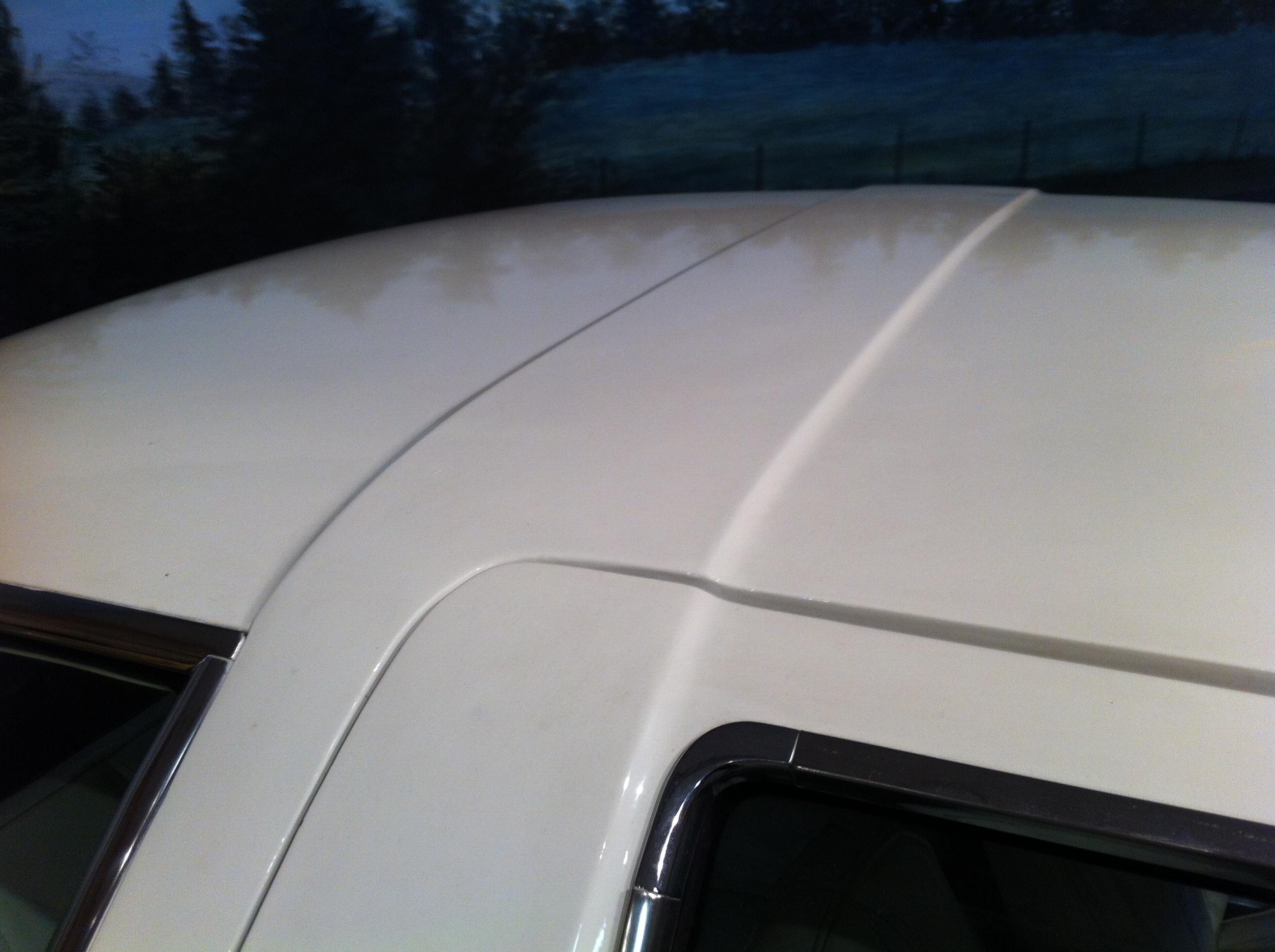
Roll bar roof bump, 1975 Pacer X

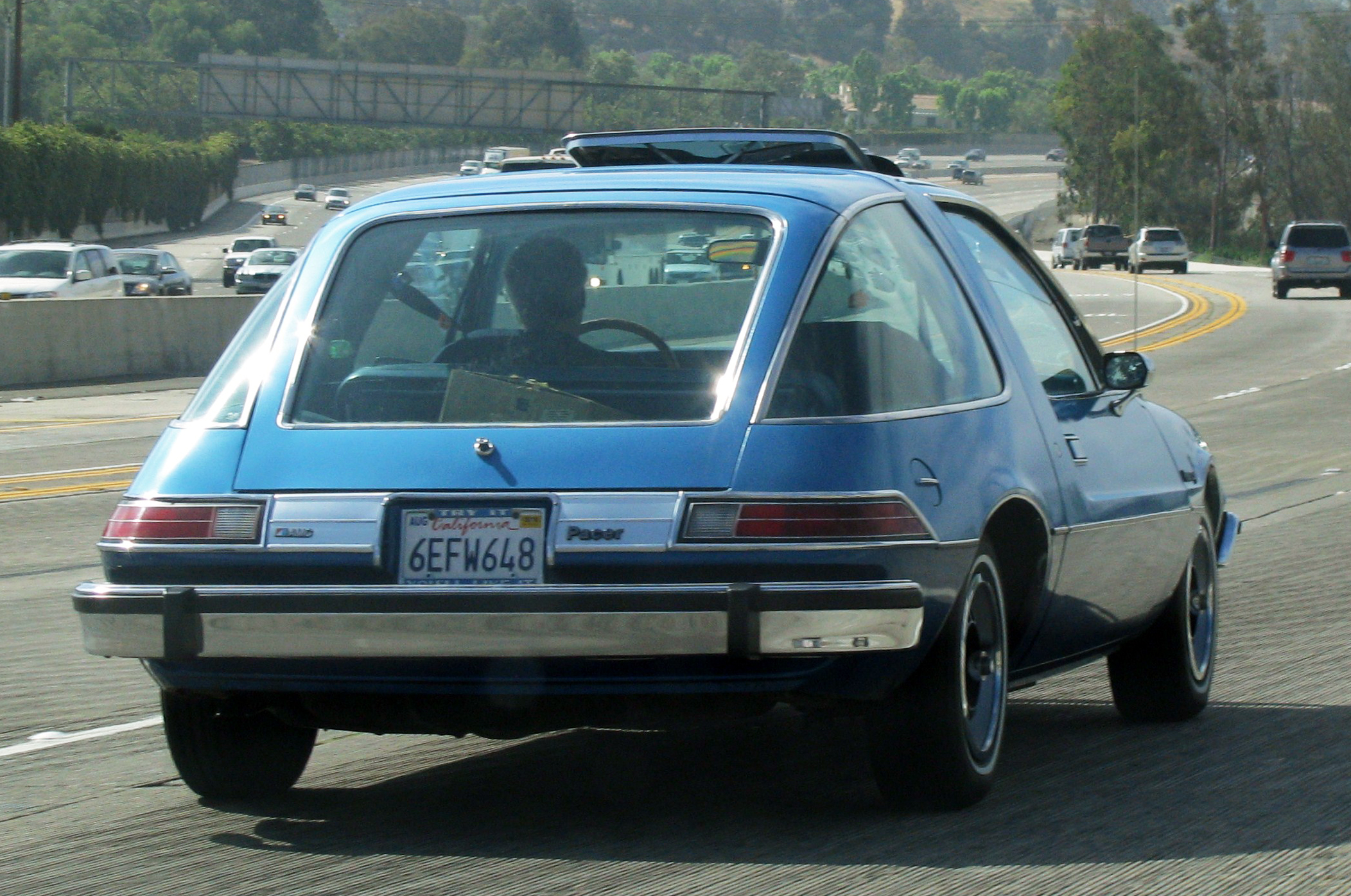
Controversial styling with a large glass area

In the mid-1970s, the U.S. government mandated significant vehicle safety improvements, starting with the 1980 model year. These included 50-mile-per-hour (80 km/h) front-end crash testing, 25-mile-per-hour (40 km/h) side crash testing, and 30-mile-per-hour (48 km/h) rollover testing, as well as the installation of bumpers that would resist a 5-mile-per-hour (8 km/h) impact at the front and 10-mile-per-hour (16 km/h) at the rear. "Full-circle body protection was designed into the Pacer, starting with the energy-absorbing bumper mounts" through upper and lower box-section rails on each side extending back to the front pillars, as well as from the bases of the pillars behind the doors, the box-section members in the body floor curve up and continue past the rear wheel houses. The Pacer was designed from the start to meet the expected stringent safety specifications.

The low beltline and window design afforded the driver outstanding visibility. The Pacer had laminated safety glass in the windshield. The articulated front wipers were hidden when parked, while a rear wiper and washer system was optional.

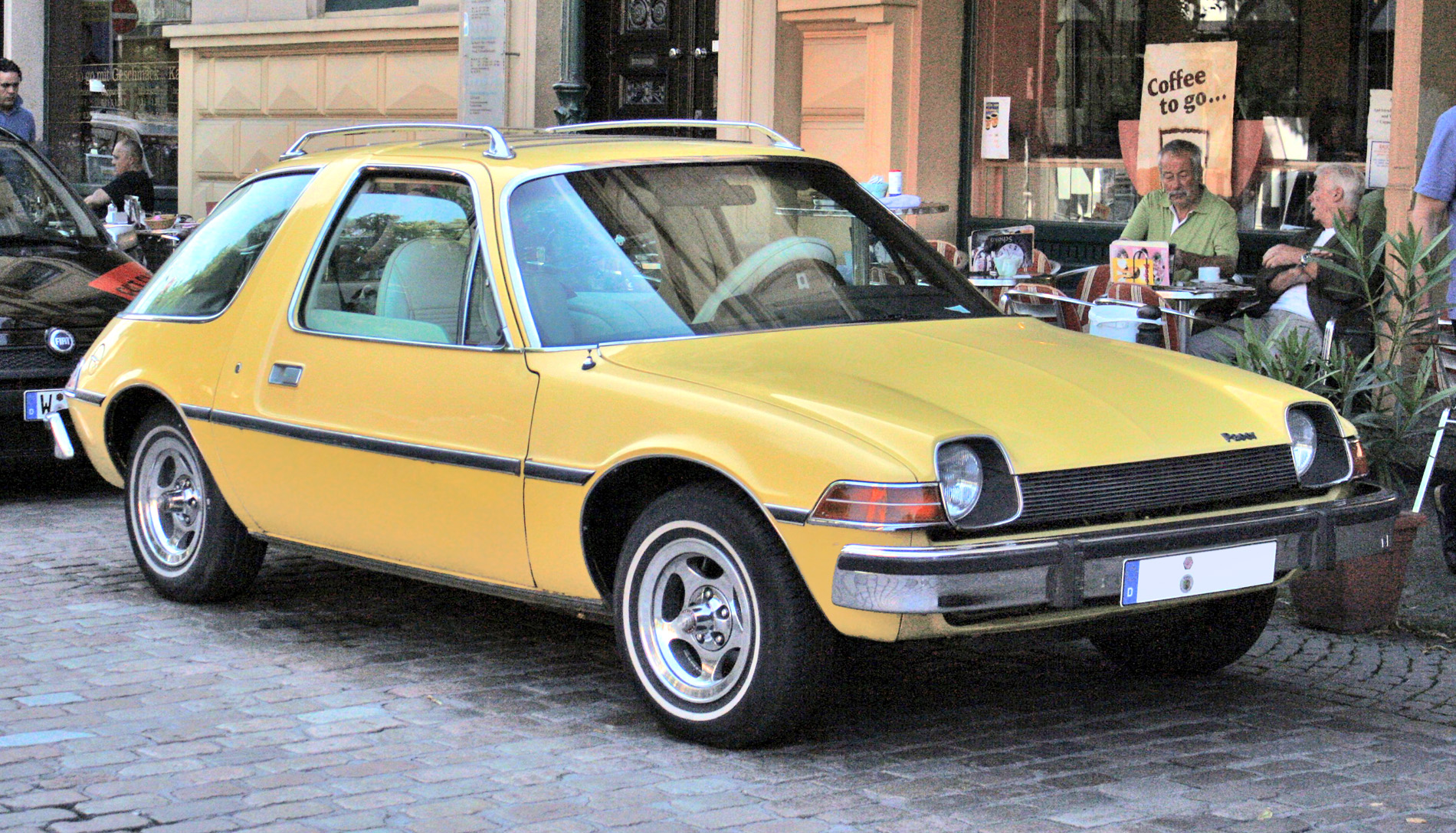
D/L coupe, before front end restyle

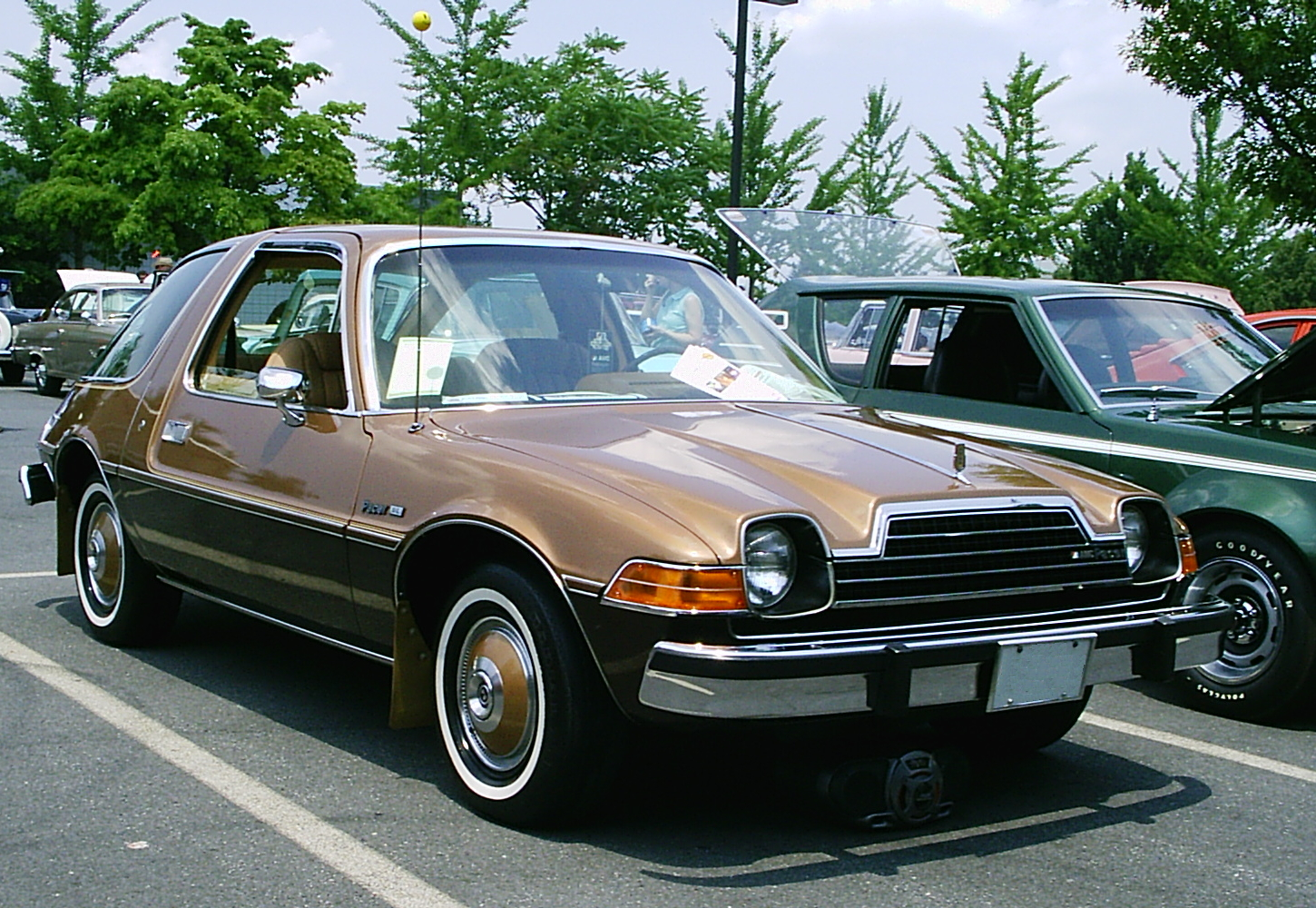
Restyled 1979 D/L coupe

General Motors, Ford, and Chrysler persuaded U.S. government authorities that modifying existing production cars to comply with the new regulations was not financially viable. They would face enormous expenses to produce new, safety-compliant vehicles. As a result of the lobbying, the requirements were reduced, including the deletion of several safety features. For example, production Pacers did not feature an actual roll bar over the passenger compartment, but the bump in the roof remained. The design of the Pacer was strong for a small car, making it solid and heavy, with protective features including massive, robust bumpers. AMC described the wide B-pillars as having "roll bar-like characteristics". Even with the Pacer's large glass area, passengers are not positioned near the windows because the windows bow outward around seated occupants. The Pacer's wide stance also makes it stable and provides a unique feeling when inside the car, providing credence to the marketing phrase used by AMC: "You only ride like a Pacer if you're wide like a Pacer."

The editors of The Motor opined the "more you study both the general layout and the detail features of the Pacer, the more convinced you become that the men who dreamed it up and decided to make it actually do drive around in crowded cities and consequently realize from their own experience that the traditional big barges are less and less easy to navigate through our streets." The unusual proportions of the Pacer provided buyers the "idea of feeling like they were sitting in the front of a roomy big American car, but without all the unnecessary length." Car and Driver road testers also noted the Pacer's "smooth and quiet ride can probably be attributed to a front subframe that isolates the passenger capsule from the engine, suspension and steering loads" making the car "eminently stable and controllable, with its rack-and-pinion steering and wide track".

The Pacer's remaining safety features were not strongly advertised and seldom influenced a potential customer's purchasing decision. The car's extra weight—due in part to the safety equipment and the abundance of heavy glass—hurt fuel economy: production models tested by the United States Environmental Protection Agency (EPA) gave 16 mpg_{‑US} (15 L/100 km; 19 mpg_{‑imp}) in the city, but 26 mpg_{‑US} (9 L/100 km; 31 mpg_{‑imp}) or better on the highway (depending on driving habits and transmission), thanks to aerodynamic efficiency.

=== Powertrain ===
Initially, the car was designed to have a Wankel rotary engine. In 1973, AMC signed a licensing agreement with Curtiss-Wright to build Wankels for cars and Jeep-type vehicles. (The agreement also permitted Curtiss-Wright to sell rotaries elsewhere.) Later, AMC decided instead to purchase the engines from General Motors (GM), which were developing them for use in their cars. However, GM canceled development in 1974 for reasons that included durability issues, the fuel crisis, tooling costs (for the engines and a new product line designed to take advantage of the rotary's ultra-compact dimensions), and the upcoming (the late 1970s) U.S. emissions legislation. It was also thought that the high-revving Wankel would not suit Americans accustomed to low revs and high torque.

General Motors's change of plans left the Pacer without an engine. American Motors took a calculated risk and introduced the new model. The company's over-commitment to the project resulted in entrapment with so much money and effort in the car's design. Engineers hastily reconfigured it to accept their existing straight-six engine. This involved a complete redesign of the drivetrain and firewall to keep the longer engine within the body dimensions designed for the Wankel, but allowed the Pacer to share many mechanical components with other AMC models. Newsweek noted the "Pacer's primary competitive drawback is gasoline mileage: AMC offers only six-cylinder engines, and the car gets only 18 miles per gallon in the city and suburban driving vs. 23 mpg or more for some four-cylinder competitors."

The "outside of the box" thinking incorporated by AMC in the Pacer as the first "wide, small car" attempted to capture a revolutionary change in the marketplace, but a radical departure from what was accepted by consumers as "good styling" was a risky strategy. Only the largest firms can stick with a radical element until it "grows", and the automaker's dominance in the marketplace may eventually establish it as a standard feature. However, by the late 1970s the styling research axiom no longer applied that if a car with some controversial styling was liked by at least half of the potential market segment; then chances were good that this feature was a differential advantage for the manufacturer. The AMC Pacer incorporated many controversial styling and design innovations that led to its market failure after five model years.

American Motors developed the Pacer by identifying emerging trends and design technologies. Still, it faced a small window of opportunity since a product that comes out either too early or too late can fail even if the opportunity was there initially. A further complication was the purchasing dynamics. The Pacer's design was focused on maximizing the internal sense of space, while the market focused on external dimensions. Many of the attributes the Pacer incorporated became the goal of all manufacturers in the two decades that followed.

With an uncommonly wide and short body for a small car, the Pacer's design remains controversial, and its engines did not improve fuel economy. Nevertheless, "the foresight by Teague and AMC was correct" with approaches to meet the evolving U.S. government regulations covering automobiles (such as the Highway Safety Act of 1970 and the new National Highway Traffic Safety Administration).

== Production and attributes ==
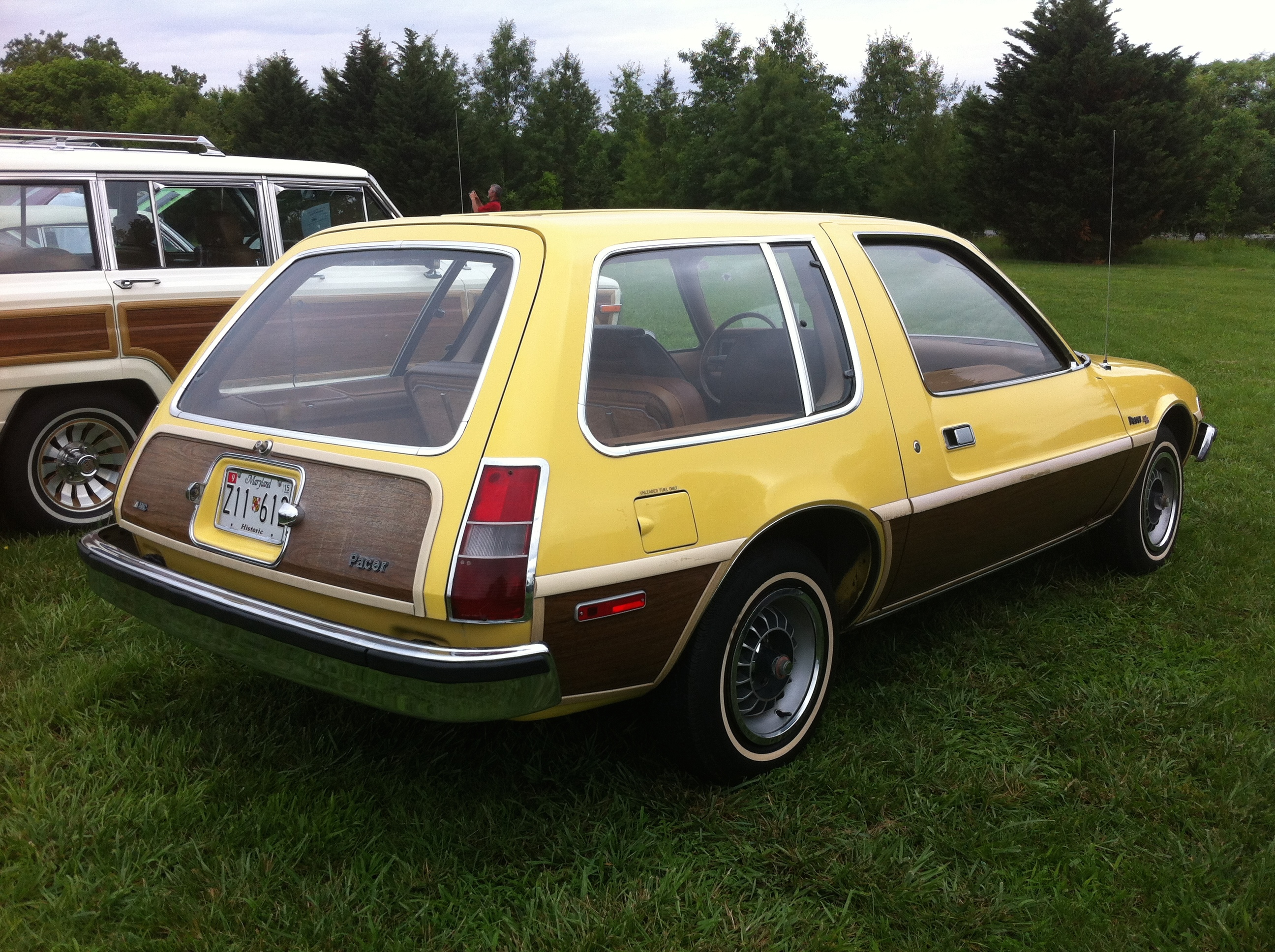
1977 Pacer DL station wagon with woodgrain

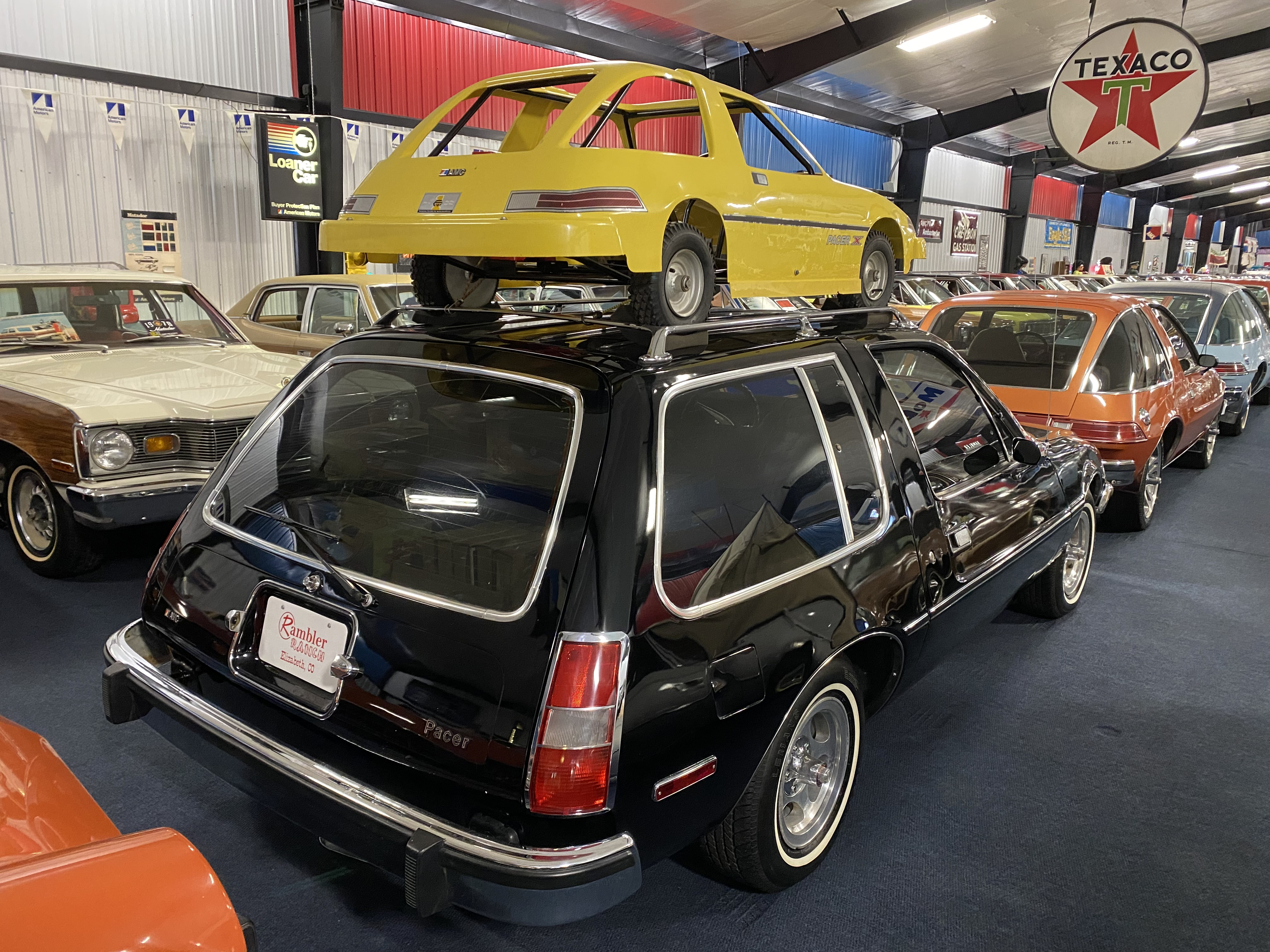
1977 Pacer wagon with a ride-on toy car (miniature automobile) for children attached to the roof rack

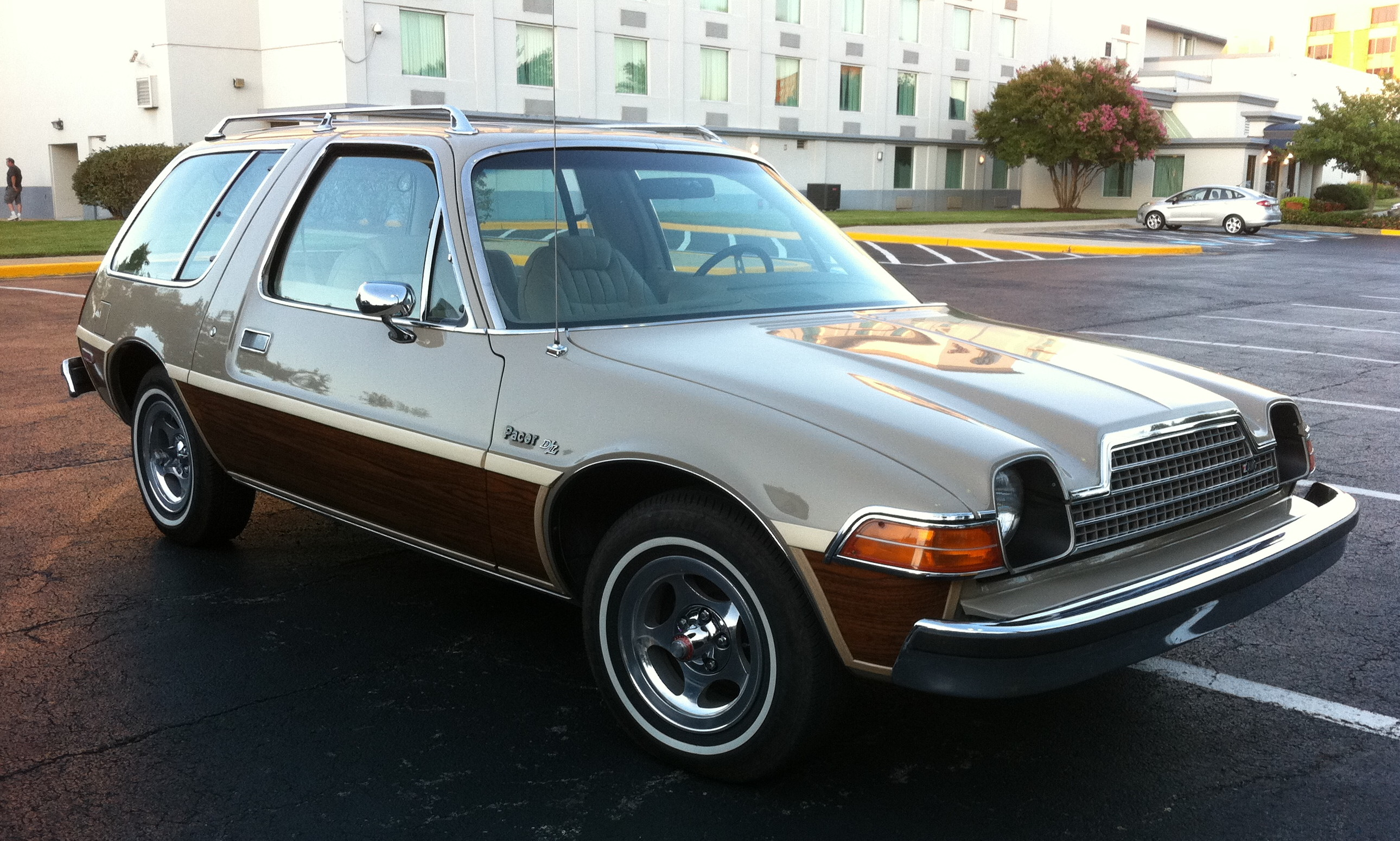
1978 Pacer DL station wagon

=== Coupe ===
American Motors began developing an entirely new car in 1971. It invested $52 million in tooling and $8 million in associated expenses to bring out the Pacer. Production began in January and the Pacer was unveiled on 13 January 1975. Sales in AMC dealer showrooms began on 28 February 1975. The Pacer was designed to attract buyers of traditional large cars to a smaller package during a time when gasoline prices were projected to rise dramatically. The new car was well received and seen as futuristic by journalists and buyers. Pacer production, which started at 530 cars a day was increased to 700 a day by April, and went up to 800 per day in September. Pacer sales success can be attributed to lack of competition from the other domestic automakers who the oil crisis had blindsided.

Production passed 100,000 Pacers in less than eight months after production began. This was the first time a new AMC model achieved the 100,000 mark in less than one year. By way of comparison, it took more than two years for the Gremlin to reach 100,000 units after production of it began in January 1970. The early demand outstripping production capacity affected the Pacer's build quality. In its first year of production, the Pacer sold well, with 145,528 units. The increased demand for compact, economy vehicles grew rapidly, and the other automakers were rolling out their small cars. Pacer sales fell after the first two years.

The Pacer's unconventional styling was commonly cited as a contributing factor to its continued lack of success. Other concerns included limited cargo space when carrying a full passenger load, primarily due to the steeply sloped rear roofline. Folding down the rear seat backrest formed a flat-floored, 29.5 cubic feet (835 L) cargo area. Design work on the new car began five years before its launch. Richard Teague explained this "was before weight was magnified as a super economy consideration". The Pacer was heavy, with only six-cylinder engines available, and drivers cited a lack of power. Car & Driver wrote, "American Motors had already quoted a curb weight of 2990 lb. for the basic Pacer when we first wrote about the car, and that already seemed quite heavy; but when we weighed the test car (whose air conditioning, automatic transmission, power steering and so forth would not account for the full difference) it registered an astounding 3425 lb."

The standard 232 cu in (3.8 L) I6, with a single-barrel carburetor was optimized for low emissions (all vehicles at the time carried emissions-reducing devices, including exhaust gas recirculation); making the Pacer relatively low-powered ("The Pacer comes with either of two AMC inline six-cylinder engines, both producing 100 hp (75 kW; 101 PS), but the larger 258 cu in (4.2 L) unit deliver[s] better mid-range torque"). The EPA fuel mileage results showed the 258 cu in (4.2 L) one-barrel engine with manual transmission achieved better economy (20 mpg_{‑US} (12 L/100 km; 24 mpg_{‑imp}) city and 31 mpg_{‑US} (8 L/100 km; 37 mpg_{‑imp}) highway) compared to the standard, lower displacement drive train (17 mpg_{‑US} (14 L/100 km; 20 mpg_{‑imp}) city and 25 mpg_{‑US} (9 L/100 km; 30 mpg_{‑imp}) highway). When equipped with the automatic transmission the Pacer's fuel economy was almost identical between the 232 and 258 cu in (3.8 and 4.2 L) engines. Additionally, a two-barrel version of the 258 cu in (4.2 L) engine was available with automatic transmission, which helped performance and the same fuel consumption rating as the one-barrel version. The EPA results noted the same fuel economy in actual on-the-road driving because in-use mileage depends on many factors. Nevertheless, the EPA method can be used to compare fuel use by cars under identical conditions, and the EPA calculated the industrywide average of the 1976 model year cars tested to be 17.6 mpg_{‑US} (13 L/100 km; 21 mpg_{‑imp}) in simulated city-plus-highway driving. None of the 1976 Pacer drivetrain configurations included catalytic converters and met California's more stringent antipollution standards.

In mid-year 1976, a floor-shifted four-speed manual transmission was made available on the Pacers. Because of the requirement to use unleaded gasoline, a new "quench-head was incorporated in I6 engines for 1977 that pushed the air-fuel mixture closer to the spark plug, created more turbulence for better mixing, allowed an additional 3 degrees of spark advance without knock, and gain an extra one mile per gallon fuel efficiency. By the time a 304 cu in (5.0 L) V8 was offered for the 1978 Pacer, AMC introduced a line of "luxury-compact" models (the AMC Concord). Moreover, gasoline prices in the U.S. remained high, limiting demand for V8-powered vehicles.

=== Station wagon ===
A station wagon body style was added for the 1977 model year. Structurally, the same as the coupe and providing "lots of head, leg, and elbow room" as the coupe, but the wagon featured significantly increased cargo capacity. The wagon body style was as novel as the unusual Pacer coupe model and featured huge doors for access. The design was identical to the coupe up to the B-pillar. A new roof extended from the B-pillar to a full-width rear hatch hinged at the roofline, providing an opening down to the top of the rear bumper. Rather than lengthening the coupe's wheelbase, the station wagon featured a 4-inch (102 mm) extension, redesigned rear quarter panels, and rear side windows. The stretch made the wagon body design weigh only 76 pounds (34 kg) more than the coupe. The Pacer wagon also had a less unusual-looking body style with a squared-off back and straight, almost upright, rear-side windows. The wagon's rear side glass featured standard vent windows, while front vent windows were optional on all Pacers. The broad and rear liftgate eased the task of loading cargo as it opened to a wide, flat cargo area with 47.8 cubic feet (1,354 L) of space, about 50% more than the coupe. Additionally, the back cushion of the rear seat could be unlatched and folded down to form a continuation of the cargo floor.

The demand for small station wagons represented 30 to 40% of the total car-line market in the U.S. The two-door Pacer wagon was positioned as entering a new segment rather than as a substitute for AMC's continuing four-door Hornet station wagon.

Some Pacer wagon models featured simulated woodgrain trim on the lower body sides and the liftgate.

=== Discontinuation ===
Increasing competition from the Big Three U.S. automakers and the rapid consumer shift to small imported cars during the late 1970s decreased demand for the Pacer models. Automobile buyers in the U.S. adjusted to smaller and lighter cars, mainly imports that offered better gas mileage; the AMC Pacer could not match German and Japanese cars. Achieving about 22 mpg_{‑US} (11 L/100 km; 26 mpg_{‑imp}), the Pacer was not a top choice for customers during the 1979 energy crisis. Moreover, AMC's partnership with Renault brought the Renault 5, named "Le Car", to the AMC dealers as a more economical model. The design of the Pacer prompted changes to the Renault 5 to adapt it to some of the U.S. marketplace conditions.

Similar to its mid-year introduction, on 3 December 1979, production of the Pacer ended at the Kenosha, Wisconsin, assembly plant where it had begun five years earlier. A total of 280,000 Pacers were built.

=== Model designations ===
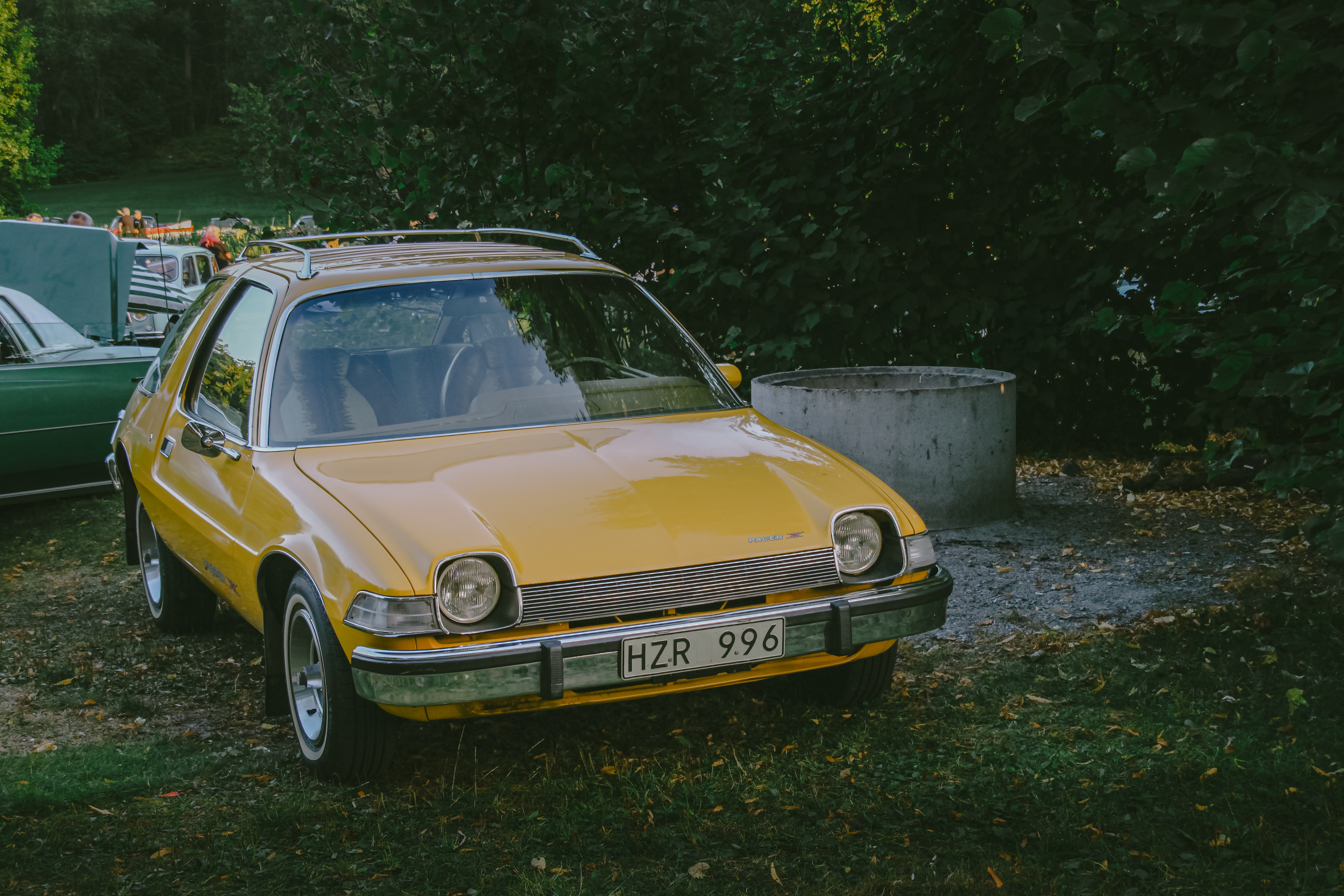
1975 AMC Pacer X

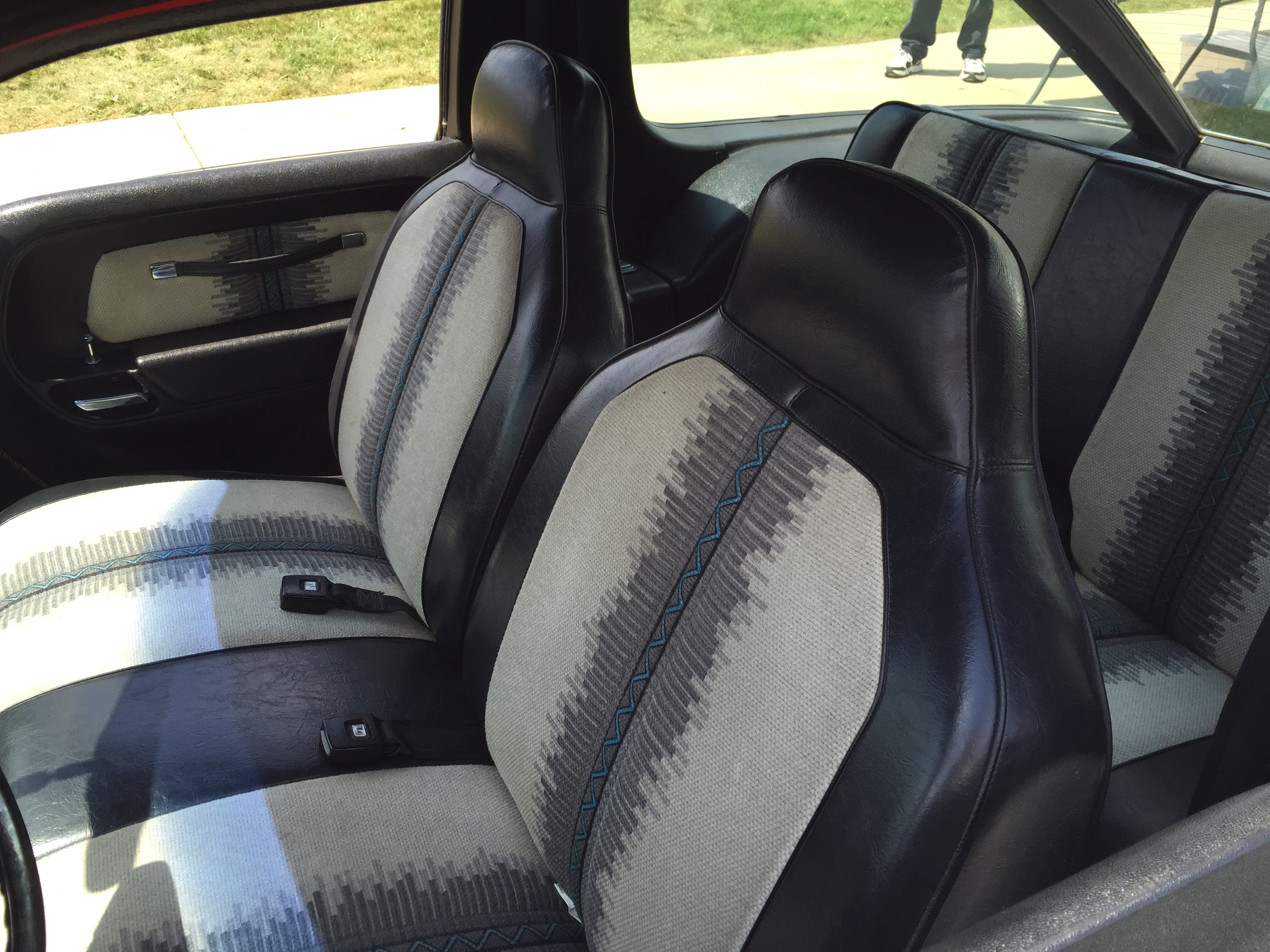
1976 Pacer standard bench seats in "Basketry Weave" upholstery

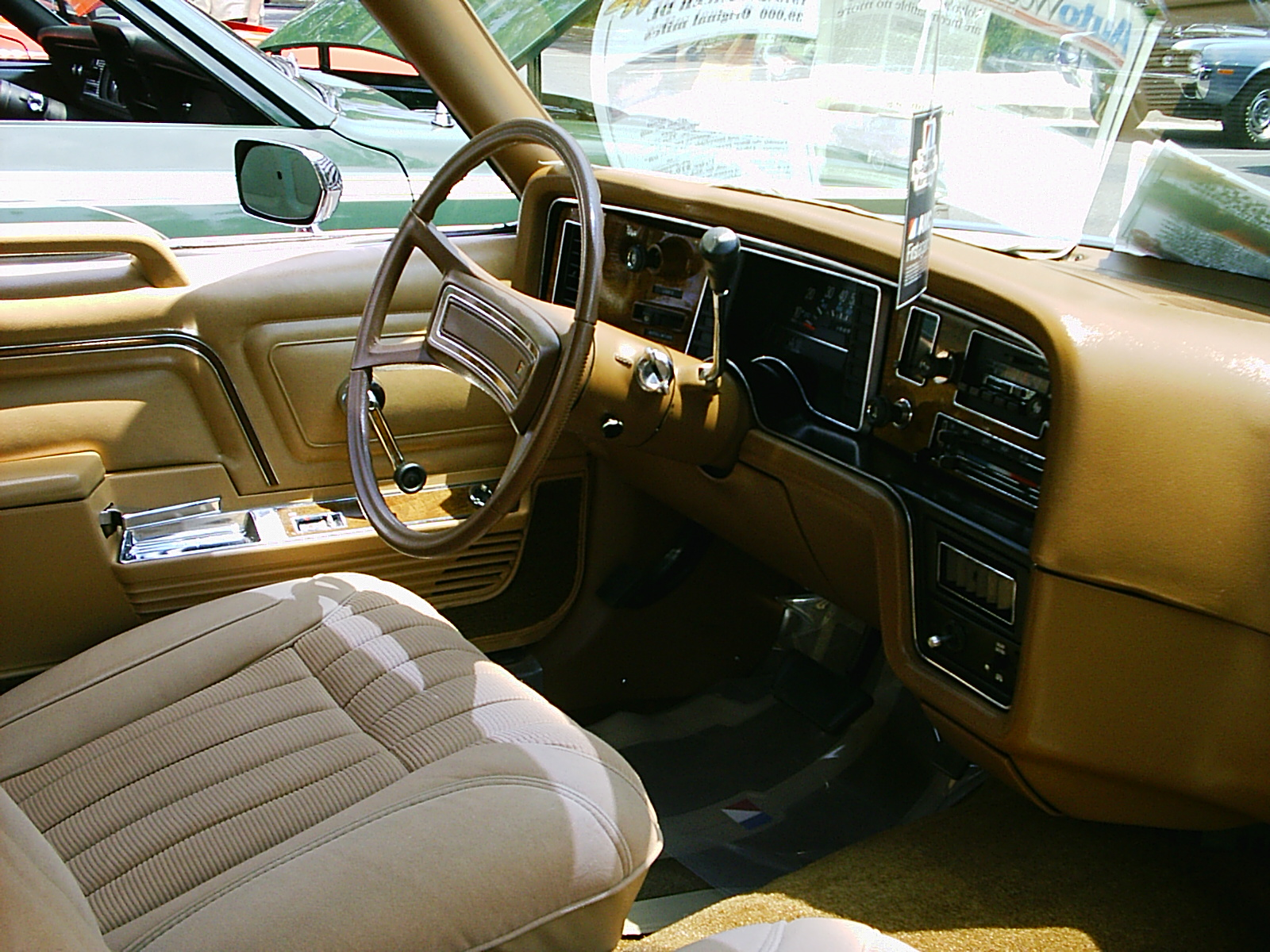
1979 D/L interior

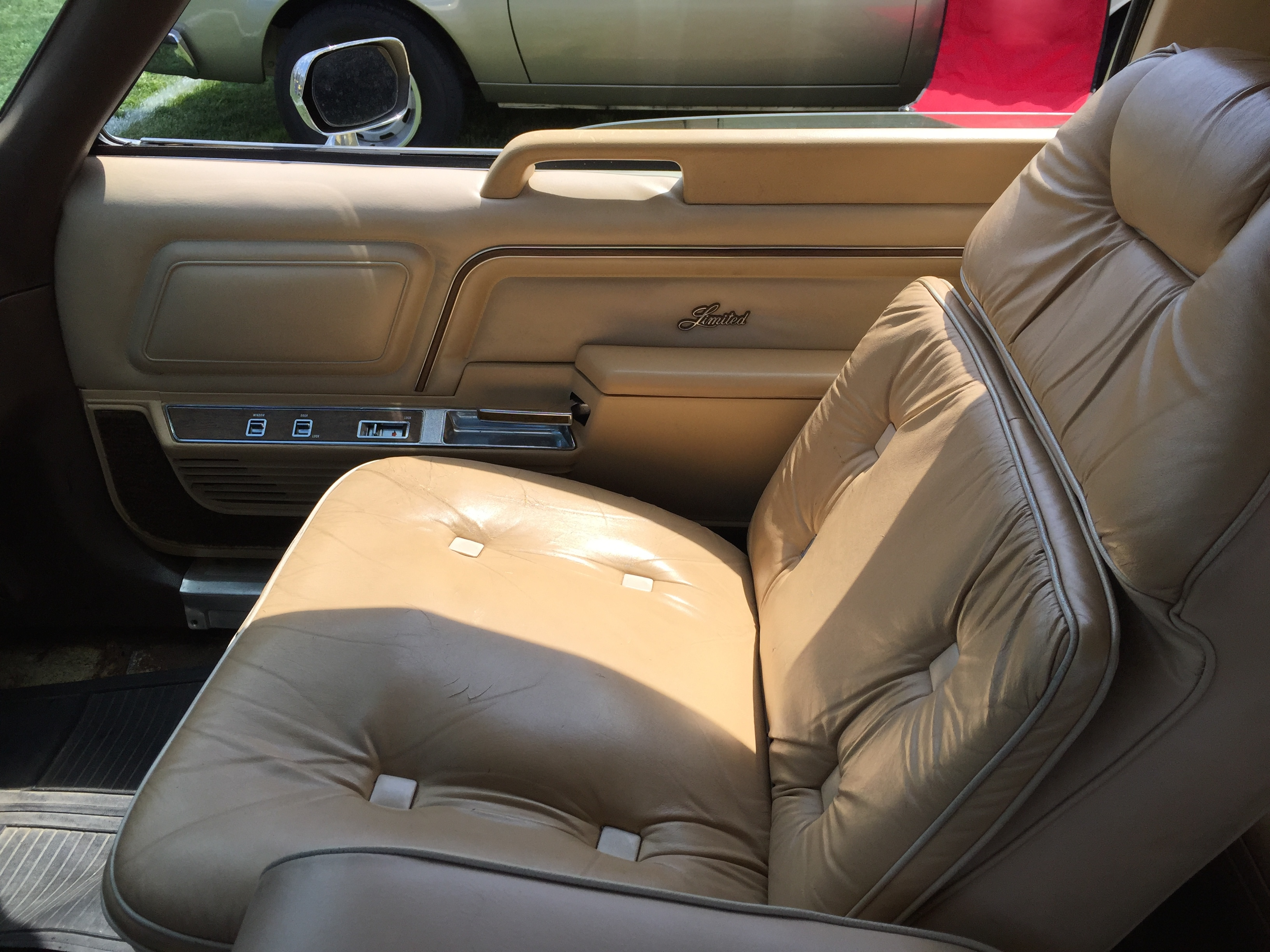
1980 Pacer Limited standard leather "pillow" design seats

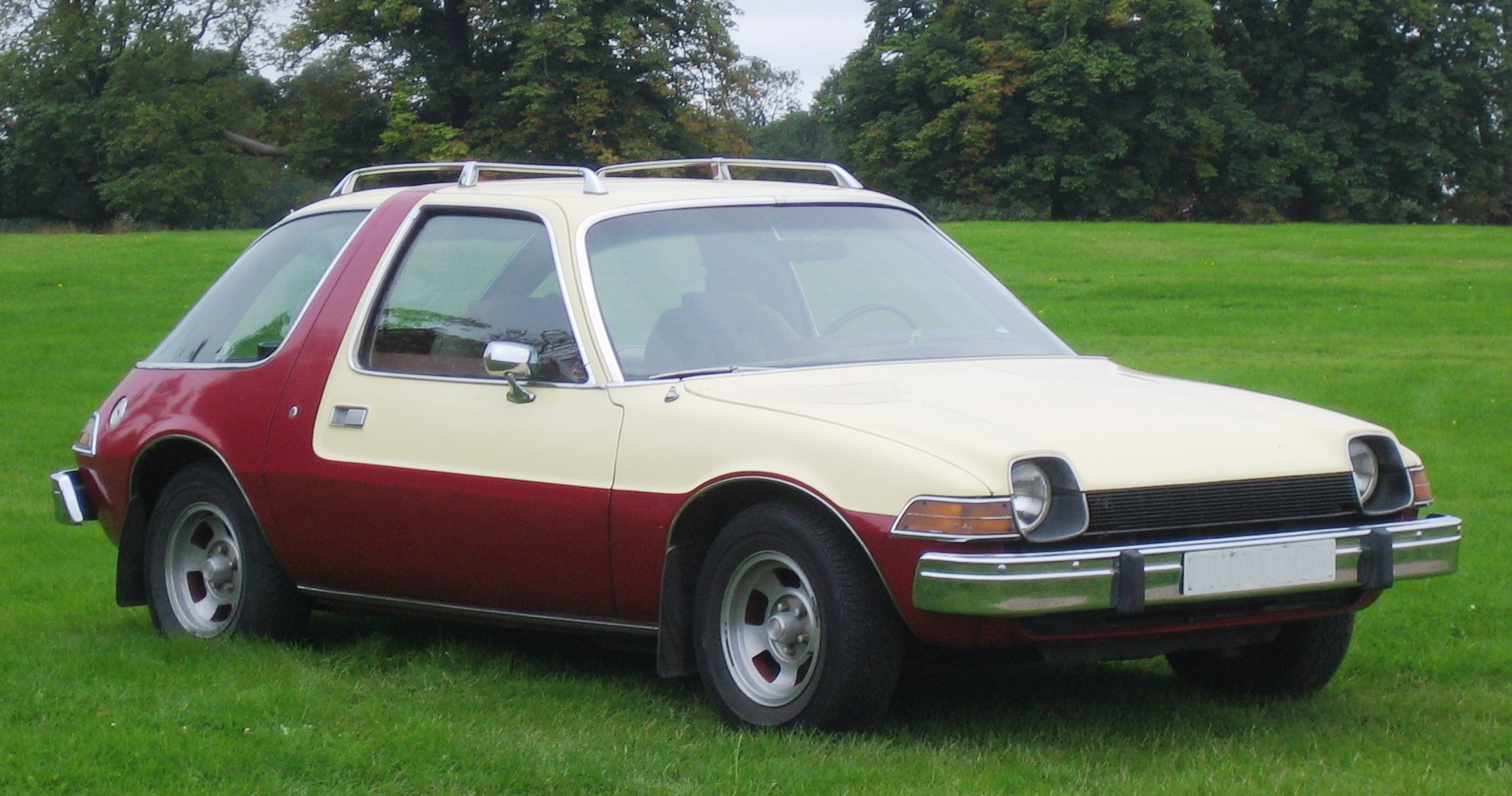
Revised two-tone paint scheme introduced in 1977

The Pacer was first positioned in the marketplace as an economy car offering a big car ride with numerous comfort and convenience options. It was soon repositioned as a small luxury car. There were numerous comfort, convenience, and appearance packages, while the range of options increased over the model years.

"X" Package: Available on the Pacer coupe from 1975 until 1977. The trim package consisted of vinyl bucket seats, a sports steering wheel, and custom trim, as well as a floor-mounted gear shift and a front sway bar. The model received exterior chrome features, styled road wheels, "Pacer X" decals on the doors, and other package identification. For 1978, a "Sport Package" replaced the X-Package, and included bucket seats, sports steering wheel, seven combinations of two-tone paint for upper and lower bodyside, and slot-styled road wheels with radial tires. The option package was available only with the 258 cu in (4.2 L) I6 or 304 cu in (5.0 L) V8 engine.

"D/L" Package: A more upscale edition, the D/L was available throughout the Pacer's production run and became the base model in 1978. The package originally included a "Navajo design" seating fabric, a woodgrain instrument panel, and some interior features that were otherwise optional. The exterior had additional chrome accents, different wheel covers, and identification badging.

"Limited": Available in 1979–1980, the Limited had leather seats, extra soundproofing, and deeper-pile carpet (18-oz. vs. the standard 12-oz) as standard, plus amenities that were otherwise options, including AM radio, power door locks, power windows, and tilt steering wheel. The exterior had chrome accents, styled road wheels, and "Limited" badging.

"Sundowner": Available through AMC dealers in California for 1975 only, the Sundowner was a basic $3,599 (suggested retail price) Pacer with options that listed for $300 included at no extra cost. In addition to the mandatory California engine emissions controls and bumper guards, the package included "Basketry Weave" fabric upholstery with coordinated trim on the door panels, plus remote control exterior mirror, rear window washer and wiper, styled road wheels with whitewall tires, and a roof rack.

"Levi's" Package: Introduced for the 1977 model year to capitalize on the popularity of the Levi's Gremlin and Hornet, the Levi's Pacer had blue denim-like upholstery and door-panel trim, with small Levi's tags on the front seats. The copper buttons in AMC's other Levi's models were omitted, and a Levi's logo sticker was applied on the front fender. The version, which could be combined with the Pacer X package, did not sell in large numbers, and it was discontinued for the 1978 model year.

Carl Green Enterprises (CGE) Pacers: these cars, modified by automobile designer Carl Green, had 401 cu in (6.6 L) AMC V8 engines plus flares, air dams, and wings. The CGE Pacers appeared in Hot Rod, Popular Hot Rodding, and Car & Driver magazines. Green also built two Pacer pace cars for B.F. Goodrich to use in the International Motor Sports Association circuit and provided body kits for Amos Johnson's Team Highball racecars.

Pacers without the optional vinyl roof trim could be finished in several unique two-tone paint combinations, with front and rear scuff molding extensions on the body sides. The two-tone treatment was changed in 1977 to an "up and over the roof" accent paint scheme for the remainder of production.

Moving toward more luxury features, power door locks became available in 1978, and in 1979, power windows were added to the options list. For both 1979 and 1980, a hood ornament and center chrome hood strip were added.

=== Show cars ===
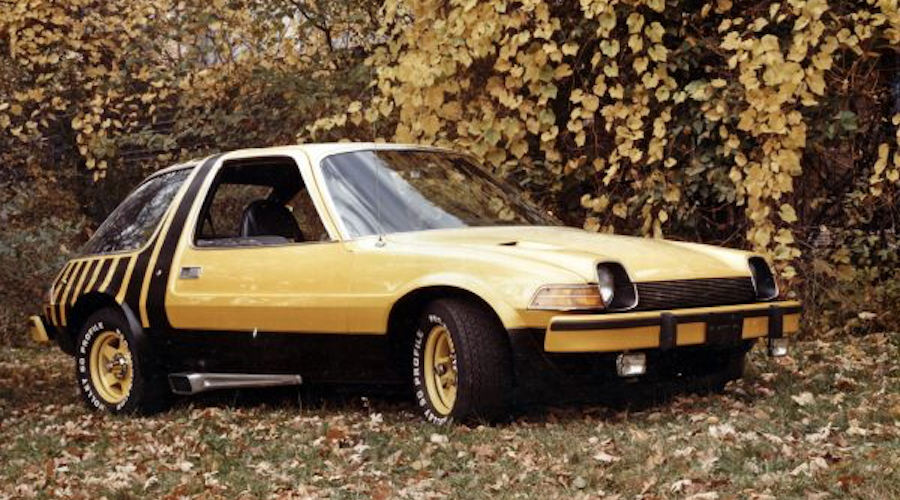
1976 AMC Pacer Stinger show car

==== Pacer Stinger ====
For the 1976 auto show circuit, AMC developed a customized Pacer Stinger. The exterior featured matte black-painted lower body panels and yellow pearl paint that faded to a pale yellow on the roof. The back half of the car had over-the-roof matte-black "bumblebee stripes" that continued onto the tailgate. The Stinger was fitted with oversize radial tires mounted on Jackman Star (brand) aluminum racing road wheels, a side-mounted exhaust, NACA duct on the hood, auxiliary Cibié (brand) driving lights, as well as a front spoiler and wheel well fender extensions. The Stinger's interior was black, with a floor-mounted shifter, front bucket seats, and a center console. Black-and-yellow stripes on the front and rear seats completed the "bumblebee" theme, while the black door panels featured yellow side cushions.

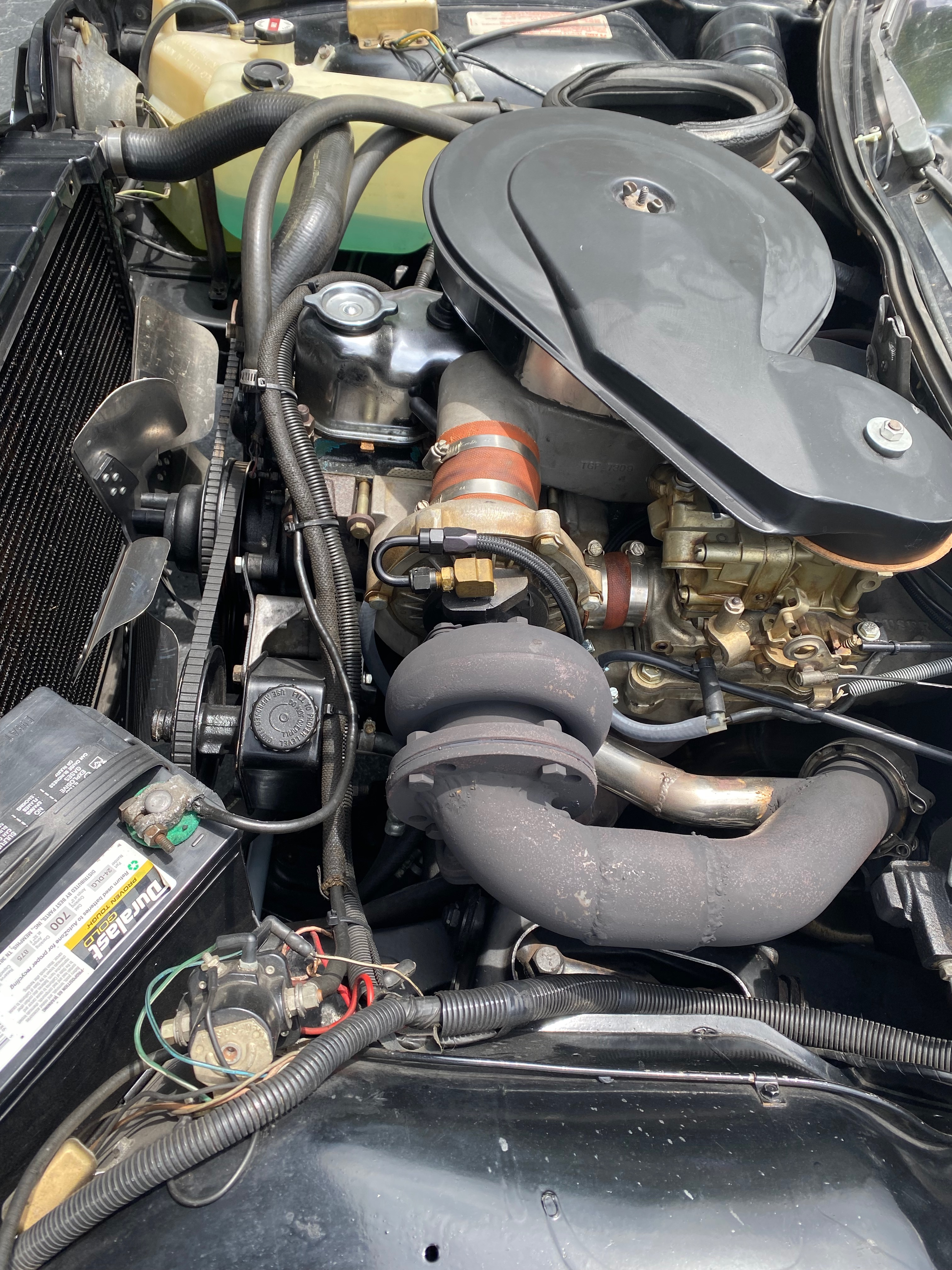
Turbocharger in Pacer Centaur prototype

==== Centaur ====
A 1976 AMC Pacer was developed for SCCA racing. The prototype was an effort between AMC and the Braun AMC dealership in Milwaukee, Wisconsin, under general manager James Bacon. The car was to be "pure stock," but plans changed due to potential claims at the time. The engine was upgraded with a turbocharger, and changes included flared fenders, Minilite road wheels, and the deletion of the rear seat to install a roll cage and a five-point harness. Modified Pacers were successful in the IMSA GT series with drivers like Amos Johnson and grassroots efforts by Team Highball. The Centaur was used to showcase Pacer performance at the dealership until 1978. It was then displayed at the Brooks Stevens Museum in Mequon, Wisconsin, until the venue closed in 1999.

==== AM Van ====
The 1977 AM Van is a custom van on a three-quarter scale with Pacer lines. Designed by Richard Teague and based on an existing car platform, but without an interior and no mechanical components. Proposed features included four-wheel drive. It had a "turbo" decal on the double side-opening rear doors. Displayed as one of seven vehicles making up the "Concept 80" auto show circuit tour, it was voted the most appealing, receiving 31% of the votes. It never moved past the concept stage, but "inadvertently foreshadowed the minivan craze that would sweep America in the mid-1980s" as well as the "small worker van" market segment.

==== Crown Pacer ====
American Motors was evaluating the Pacer as a compact personal luxury model with the Crown Pacer concept car that was shown at the 1978 show circuit. Starting with the Detroit Auto Show in the fall of 1977, AMC aimed to create a luxury image for the Pacer. Finished in pearlescent white with a two-section vinyl-covered roof that was padded, the Crown Pacer's exterior featured gold accents - including the spokes of the wire wheels. Pictures from the Chicago Auto Show show it with an interior upholstered in white leather and numerous luxury features such as a large inbuilt sun roof, real wire wheels, full rocker panel bright trim, color-matched integrated flexible front and rear fascia and bumper covers with black rubber guards and impact (nerf) strips as well as a full-width grille that also hid the headlights.

== Electric Pacers ==
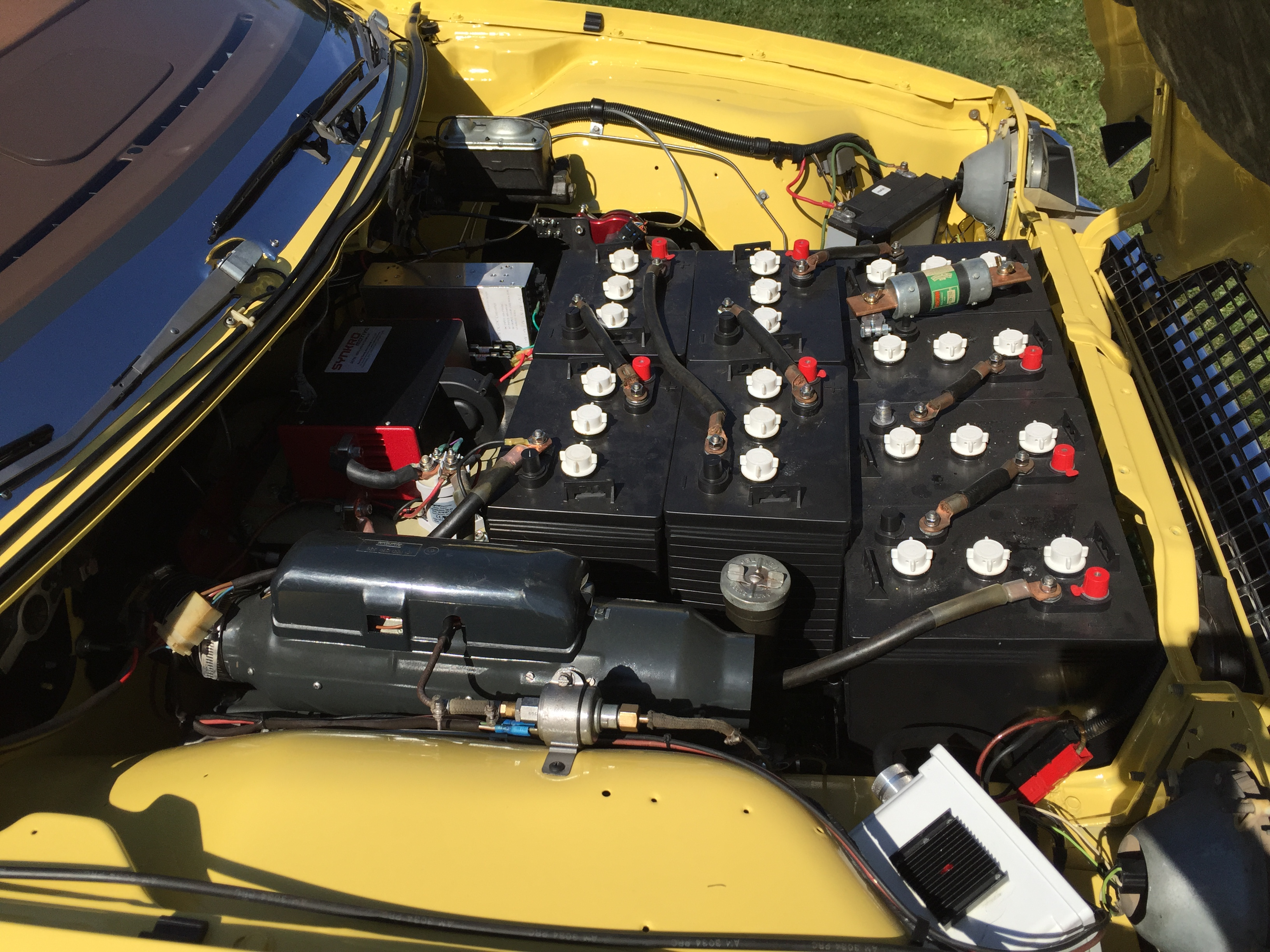
1978 EVA Change of Pace front battery pack

Some AMC Pacers were converted to plug-in electric vehicles.

Electric Vehicle Associates (EVA) of Cleveland was best known for its Change of Pace model – a built-to-order adaptation of the Pacer that was priced at $12,360 in 1978. The company converted over 100 units.

First available in the sedan version, power came from eighteen 6-volt lead–acid batteries to a 15 kW (20 hp) series DC motor with a stock three-speed automatic transmission. The EVA Change of Pace sedan weighed 3,990 lb (1,810 kg) and reached 55 mph (89 km/h) with a 53-mile (85 km) range. Regenerative braking is used in conjunction with the standard hydraulic brake system which uses front-wheel discs and rear drums. Vehicle tests that focused on the electrical drive system including the batteries, controller, and motor "found that the Pacer performance is approximately equal to the majority of the vehicles tested in the 1977 assessment."

Later, a station wagon version had twenty VARTA batteries housed in two-packs (front and rear), with a 26 kW (35 hp) (at 3,000 rpm) motor, and the car was complete in every detail down to a gas heater. The electric Pacer wagon was one of the more expensive cars at $14,000. The Lead Industries Association (LIA) sponsored a tour for government and industry officials that featured an EVA Pacer wagon. Consolidated Edison in New York City purchased 40 modified AMC Pacers from EVA. The United States Army also included EVA Pacers in its inventory of special-purpose electric vehicles.

A video documentary about the Electric Vehicle Association's electric Pacers is titled "A Change of Pace." A fully restored wagon has had its original silicon-controlled rectifier (SCR) control replaced with a modern controller and the "hydraulically operated hybrid vehicle recharging system" removed because of its lack of efficiency to use compressed air from suspension travel to power a small generator to recharge the batteries.

== International markets ==
=== Europe ===
French advertisement comparing the Pacer's shape to a woman's buttocks, 1975

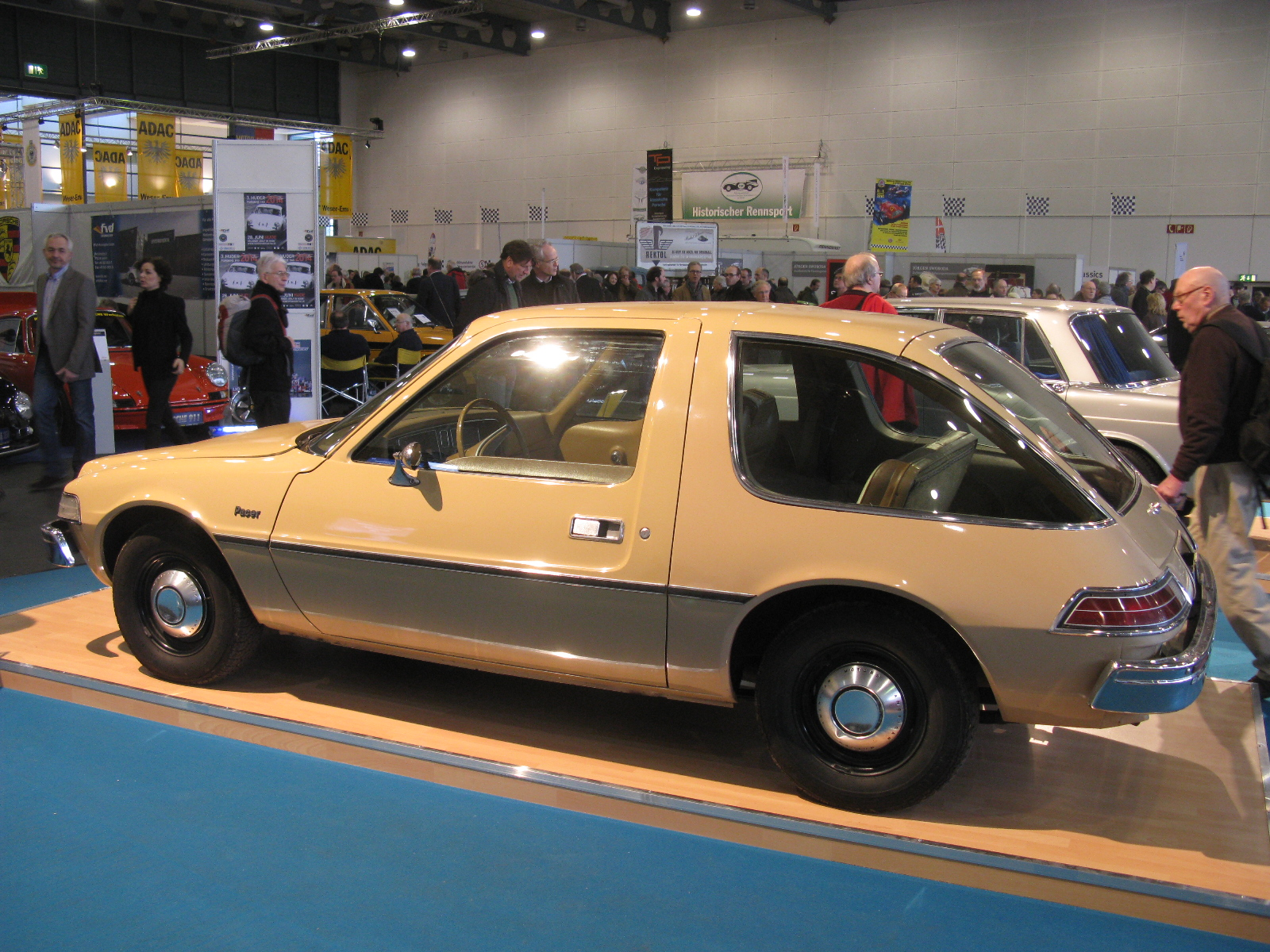
AMC Pacer in Germany

American Motors exported the Pacer to several European nations. Jean-Charles, the AMC distributor in Paris, likened the rounded body of the Pacer to the buttocks of an attractive woman in magazine advertisements. Pacers exported to Europe were available in higher trim levels.

Sales were not very good, but in Belgium, a brand-new Pacer could be purchased as late as 1983.

==== United Kingdom ====
American Motors vehicles were exported to the United Kingdom during the 1960s and 1970s and sold by Rambler Motors (A.M.C.) Ltd in London with dealers in London, York, Kent, and Worcester. While other models such as the Rambler Classic, Rebel, Ambassador, and Matador had been exported as completed factory right-hand-drive vehicles, the Pacer was only built with left-hand drive. A British company, C.T. Wooler, in Andover, Hampshire had been in the business for a long time converting LHD cars to RHD and entered into an agreement with AMC to convert its vehicles. C.T. Wooler converted the Pacer to right-hand drive by leaving the majority of the steering gear on the left-hand side of the car and running a chain-drive behind the dashboard from the steering wheel (now on the right-hand side) to the top of the steering column. The car retained its unequal-length doors, designed for LHD markets, meaning that in the United Kingdom, the longer door was on the driver's side, leaving the passengers to use the smaller door, which "in the typically confined British parking spot was virtually impossible". The Pacer was wider than a Rolls-Royce Silver Shadow and slightly longer than the then-current Ford Cortina. The British motoring press adversely reviewed the car and AMC soon stopped exporting it.

=== Mexico ===
The Pacer was produced in Mexico by Vehículos Automotores Mexicanos (VAM) starting in 1976. They were marketed as premium-priced luxury cars. The VAM versions came with different engines, interiors, and other components because vehicles made in Mexico had to have at least 60% of their parts sourced locally. The engine was designed by AMC, but was modified and built by VAM. A unique-to-Mexico 282 cu in (4.6 L) straight-six engine was standard. It was designed to cope with low-octane fuel and high altitudes. This engine featured dished pistons with a 3.909-inch (99.3 mm) bore and 3.894-inch (98.9 mm) stroke, as well as a unique head and exhaust porting design. Unavailable in Mexico were the V8 engine, four-speed transmission, three-speed transmission with an overdrive unit, or the station wagon body style.

==== 1976 ====
The initial VAM Pacers were equivalent to AMC's domestic Pacer DL models, except for a longer list of standard equipment and some features later included on AMC's "Limited" models. The VAM Pacer was offered in one version and had no model or trim badges. The standard engine was VAM's 282 cu in (4.6 L) I6 producing 200 hp (149 kW; 203 PS) with a 7.7:1 compression ratio, a 266-degree camshaft, and a Holley 2300 two-barrel carburetor coupled to a steel intake manifold. The initial production featured a T-150 three-speed manual transmission with a heavy-duty clutch and a 3.31:1 rear gear ratio. All VAM Pacers came with a heavy-duty suspension (front sway bar with heavy-duty springs and shock absorbers), power brakes with front disc brakes, power rack-and-pinion steering, a larger radiator with a coolant recovery tank, a rigid four-bladed cooling fan, and electronic ignition.

Standard convenience features included a custom luxury steering wheel, column-mounted manual shifter, woodgrain dashboard trim, inside hood release, individual reclining front seats with adjustable headrests, center folding armrest, fixed two-point seatbelts, two-speed electric wipers, electric washers integrated into the wiper arms, 140 km/h speedometer, courtesy lights, monaural AM radio with a single in-dash speaker, electric analog clock, heater with windshield defroster, lighter, dashboard ashtray, locking glove box, tinted windshield, plastic door panels with cloth insert and pull strap, dual rear ashtrays, folding down rear bench seat, trunk carpet, sound-insulating cardboard-type headliner (US base model type), and round dome light.

The external appearance and equipment of the VAM Pacer consisted of a full bright molding package (wheel lips, top edges of the hood and fenders, window surrounds, rocker panels), a bright rear panel between the taillights and the rear license plate housing, protective side moldings, front and rear bumper guards, bumper nerfing strips, five-mile-per-hour bumpers with recovering shocks (only VAM car with this characteristic along with the Matador-based Classic line), five-spoke in-house VAM wheels, trim rings and full cover volcano center caps on the wheels, ER78x14 radial tires, driver's side manual remote mirror, radio antenna on the passenger's side fender, squared VAM logo emblems on the fenders, Pacer emblems on the fenders and bright rear panel and a two-step hood latch.

The positioning of the VAM Pacer differed from AMC's initial domestic marketing. American Motors first targeted it as a small car to consumers accustomed to large vehicles and later repositioned it as a more upscale model.. In Mexico, the car was designed to be a futuristic, high-end luxury car from its introduction. This strategy was reinforced after the first 200 units were produced, when the three-speed automatic transmission became standard equipment and an "Automático" emblem was added to the bright rear panel. The VAM Pacer became the most expensive and luxurious VAM model when the 1976 Classic line was discontinued mid-year. The model's uniqueness, coupled with its luxury and high price point, made the Pacer the company's default flagship model. However, the 'luxury compact' was not a known segment to Mexican consumers.

An unusual aspect of the 1976 VAM Pacer was its seat upholstery. VAM's design was based on AMC's Oleg Cassini interior for the 1974–1975 Matador coupe. This "haute couture" interior was featured in the Pacer and in all three VAM Classic models for the year. The Pacer's seats incorporated a golden Cassini crest on the adjustable headrests and a pattern with copper buttons forming squares. Unlike the AMC Pacer, the VAM Pacer included many standard features and only a few factory options. These included a rear wiper and washer, rear defroster, reading dome light, trunk cover, remote-controlled driver's side mirror, luxury wheel covers, and heavy-duty cooling system (seven-bladed flexible fan and fan shroud). A universal air conditioning system was available only as a dealership option.

==== 1977 ====
The 1977 VAM Pacer was almost the same as the previous year on the outside, but was made more luxurious inside. The Cassini-style upholstery was replaced with a more discreet luxury design featuring a "zigzag" arrangement of plain soft buttons that form diagonal lines. The AM monaural radio was replaced by an AM/FM monaural unit, three-point retractable seatbelts replaced the lap-only units, and a light for the glove compartment was now standard. The 282 cu in (4.6 L) engine underwent engineering upgrades that included an all-new head design with an improved cooling system and quench-type combustion chambers, a higher 8.0:1 compression ratio, and a new two-barrel aluminum intake manifold, while the rear differential gear ratio changed from 3.31:1 to 3.07:1. These upgrades gave the VAM Pacer an estimated 12 hp (9 kW; 12 PS) increase over the previous year, improved fuel economy, and increased top speed, while maintaining torque and the car's towing capacity. This was also the first year VAM models could be ordered with a factory air-conditioning system. Pacers with the A/C included five dashboard air vents as well as a 55-amp alternator, a flexible seven-bladed cooling fan, a three-row radiator, and a fan shroud. The previously optional luxury wheel covers were now included as standard equipment.

==== 1978 ====
The 1978 model year VAM Pacers gained new hood and grille designs. The only technical difference this year was the replacement of the Holley 2300 carburetor with a Motorcraft 2150 unit featuring a built-in altitude compensator, despite its slightly lower flow rate. This reduced power but enhanced emission certification and was more reliable in changing altitudes. New standard features included a hood light, a speedometer in both kilometers and miles per hour, door panels including a vertical stripe pattern over their top edges, a different AM/FM radio model, a new flat-faced luxury steering wheel design with an AMC logo, and new seat designs. The heater was improved by adding air vents to the left of the instrument cluster, at the center of the dashboard above the ashtray, and over the top-right corner of the glovebox door, regardless of whether the air conditioning system was present. The heater controls were revised to include the VENT option in the airflow selection, now via a sliding lever rather than the five buttons used over the prior two years. The two remaining air vents, the passenger-side one over the top-left corner of the glove box door and the driver 's-side vent integrated under the steering column, were included with the A/C system.

==== 1979 ====
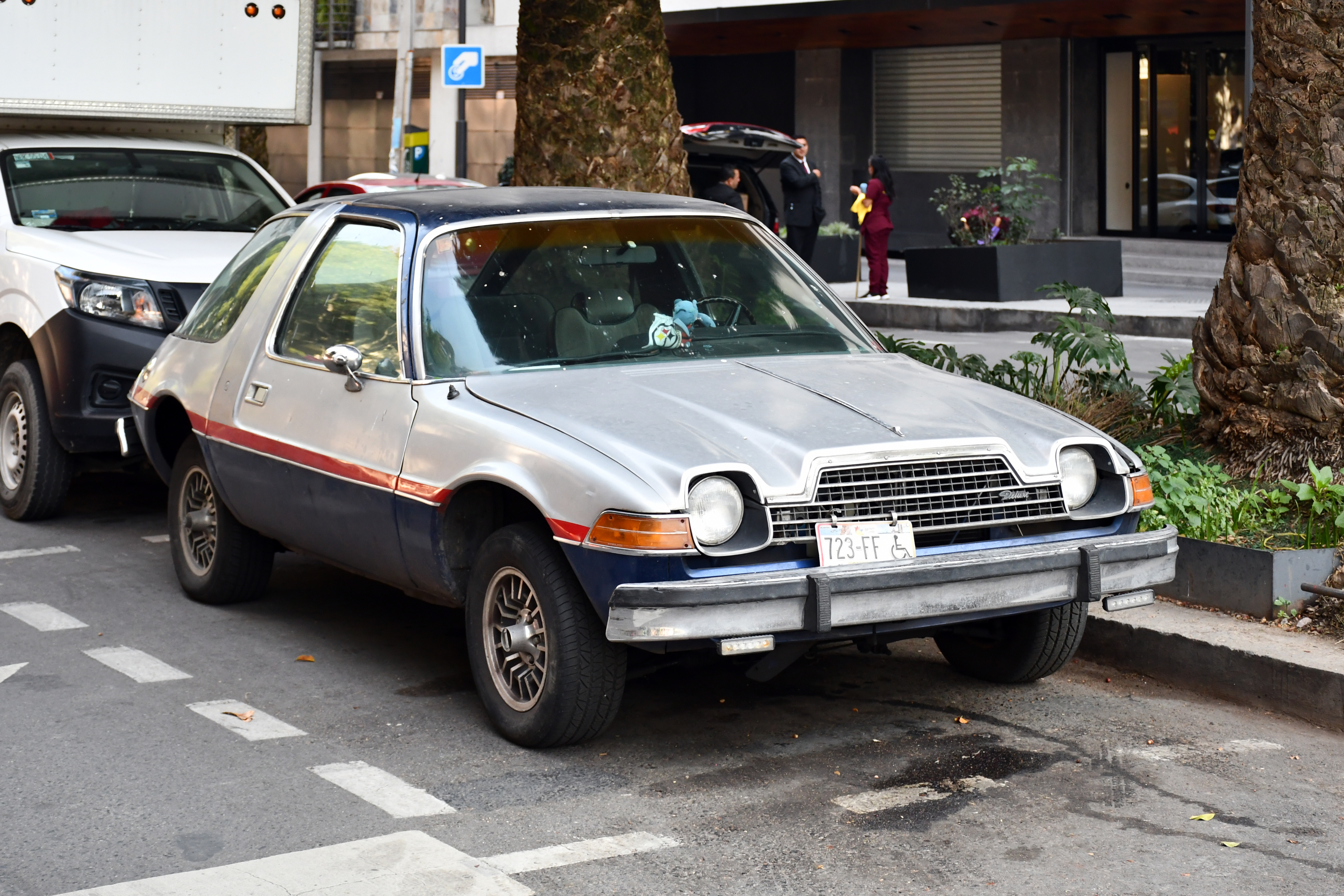
1979 VAM Pacer (with numerous modifications)

The 1979 VAM Pacer was a continuation of the 1978 model in terms of appearance, with the exceptions of the previously standard wheel covers and a new hood bright molding with front ornament. All VAM Pacers now featured VAM's in-house five-spoke wheels with trim rings and chrome volcano hubcaps with exposed lug nuts. New seat designs with a horizontally striped pattern and Barcelona crests on the headrests were a luxury feature (identical to the AMC Matador Barcelona version), a new steering wheel design with a soft rectangular center button, all-new door panel designs in plastic and vinyl with a rigid top pull strap, and sliding locks with woodgrain accents. The headliner was changed to a cloth-wrapped unit. VAM began using the net rating system for measuring engine output. The 1979 VAM 282 cu in (4.6 L) I6 engine was now rated at 132 hp (98 kW; 134 PS) at 3900 rpm. The electrical system was revised, with a new fuse box located under the dashboard on the driver's side firewall. A total of 369 VAM Pacers were sold.

==== VAM Pacer X ====
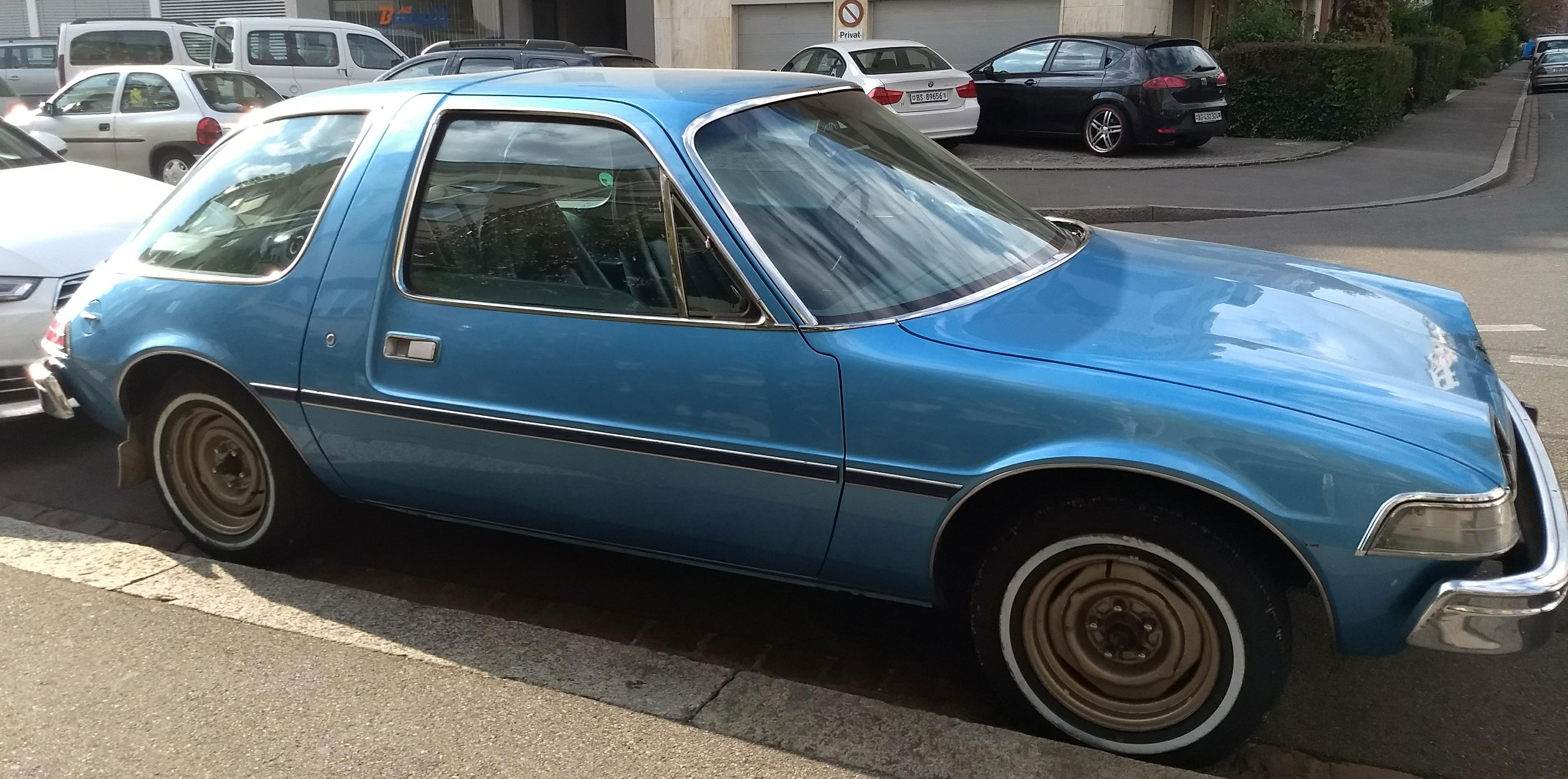
VAM Pacer X

A new model, the VAM Pacer X, was introduced in 1979 with a high-performance focus. It featured a high-output version of the 282 cu in (4.6 L) engine with a higher 8.5:1 compression ratio, a semi-ported head, centrifugal advance-modified electronic distributor for higher acceleration, a set of headers with two final outlets divided between the first three and second three cylinders (even though a final single exhaust was used through a Y-shaped portion), and the return of the Holley 2300 two-barrel carburetor. The output for this engine, code-named "4.6 SX", is estimated at 147–152 hp (110–113 kW; 149–154 PS) net at 4000 rpm. This engine made the Pacer X the second-best-performing VAM car of 1979, surpassing the four-speed American Rally AMX (Concord AMX equivalent) by a single tenth of a second in VAM's acceleration tests, with its standard 282 cu in (4.6 L).

The Pacer X was available in only three colors (black, white, and wine red), included colored-matched bumpers, and had most of the bright trim deleted. The model featured thin golden stripes surrounding the door and side glass, extending from side to side across the roof. The VAM eight-spoke sports steel wheels were painted gold with blacked-out volcano hubcaps; the rear and side glass moldings were also blacked out; and "Pacer X" decals were on the lower front corners of the doors. The Pacer X interior included unique reclining front bucket seats, a center console with a locking compartment and ashtray instead of an armrest, a set of "rallye" gauges (water temperature, clock, ammeter, and oil pressure) instead of the in-dashboard ashtray, a 6000 rpm tachometer in place of the electric clock, three-arm spoked sports steering wheel with a circular horn button with a VAM logo, floor-mounted three-speed automatic transmission, remote-controlled driver's side door mirror, and reading dome lights. Air conditioning was standard on this model, and most units included a tinted-glass pop-up sunroof. The remaining equipment was the same as the standard model: power brakes, power steering, front sway bar, as well as heavy-duty shock absorbers and springs, 3.07:1 rear axle ratio, heavy-duty cooling system, AM/FM monaural radio, tinted windshield, light group, inside hood release, and three-point retractable seatbelts. The VAM Pacer X was limited to 250 units and is the most collectible Pacer model in Mexico.

A total of 619 VAM Pacers were produced in 1979, the last year of production in Mexico. The AMC Pacer continued into the 1980 model year.

== Motorsports ==
A 1976 Pacer was driven by Gordon Olsen and Bob Stone in the 1979 SCORE Baja 1000 Pro Class race and finished Class 6 (production cars) in second place, behind a Ford Ranchero truck. With a high rate of dropouts, "anyone that officially finishes a Baja race is a winner." Although many questioned "What's a nice odd econo-car like you doing in an off-road race?", the car was doing very well with Olsen swapping the lead with the V8 powered truck. However, an impact resulted in the destruction of the Pacer's radiator giving the lead to the Ford truck after 21 hours and 20 minutes of racing.

== Reception and reviews ==
Upon its debut, the AMC Pacer received an overwhelmingly positive reception from the North American automotive press, with many journalists hailing it as a long-overdue departure from traditional Detroit design. At the press preview, journalists noted a sense of privilege in witnessing "something new in automobile design". Small Cars magazine reported that "admiration was an obvious reaction". Arguably, the opinions on the Pacer's introduction could be summarized as the "car of the future" and "the automotive press loved it".

Road & Track ran a cover story about the "Surprising new car from the smallest of the Big Four", describing design and engineering details.

Motor Trend magazine, which was one of many featuring the car on its cover, lauded the Pacer as "the most creative, most people-oriented auto born in the U.S. in 15 years," specifically praising the car's visibility and spacious cabin.

The February 1975 issue of Car and Driver magazine's editor, Don Sherman, described the Pacer as "our first real urban transporter." He framed the car as a test of consumer values, asking if Americans were ready to buy cars for "transportation" rather than as "social props".

Michael Lamm, the automotive journalist with Popular Mechanics, described the "strikingly futuristic" styling and "thoughtful touches." He found the rack-and-pinion steering to be precise and the ride quality superior to that of typical short-wheelbase cars. The "tight turning radius" made parking "easy", although he criticized the oversized steering wheel. Summing up, he wrote that with its "very modern styling, ample power and generous interior" the Pacer was "more car" than "the Mustang II or "GM's sporty compacts (Monza, Skyhawk/Starfire)", and that its performance felt "strong—certainly on a par with most V8s."

The April 1975 issue of Road & Track described the appearance as "bold, clean and unique...even when it's going 60 mph it looks as if it's standing still ... most attractive to look at and pleasant to sit in". This review offered one of the first major technical critiques of the car. Testers found the "old-fashioned and unimaginative" engineering—specifically, the heavy inline-six engine and rear leaf springs—to be incompatible with the innovative body design. They also noted "anxious moments" during panic braking tests.

The May 1976 issue of Car and Driver magazine famously dubbed the Pacer the "Flying Fishbowl". Others likened its aesthetic to " George Jetson's mode of transportation".

Consumer Reports recommended the Pacer for those seeking a small car, noting that in their tests "the Pacer scored better than such domestic subcompacts like the Ford Pinto and Chevrolet Vega". They also noted it held its own against the larger Dodge Dart, Chevrolet Nova, and Plymouth Valiant.

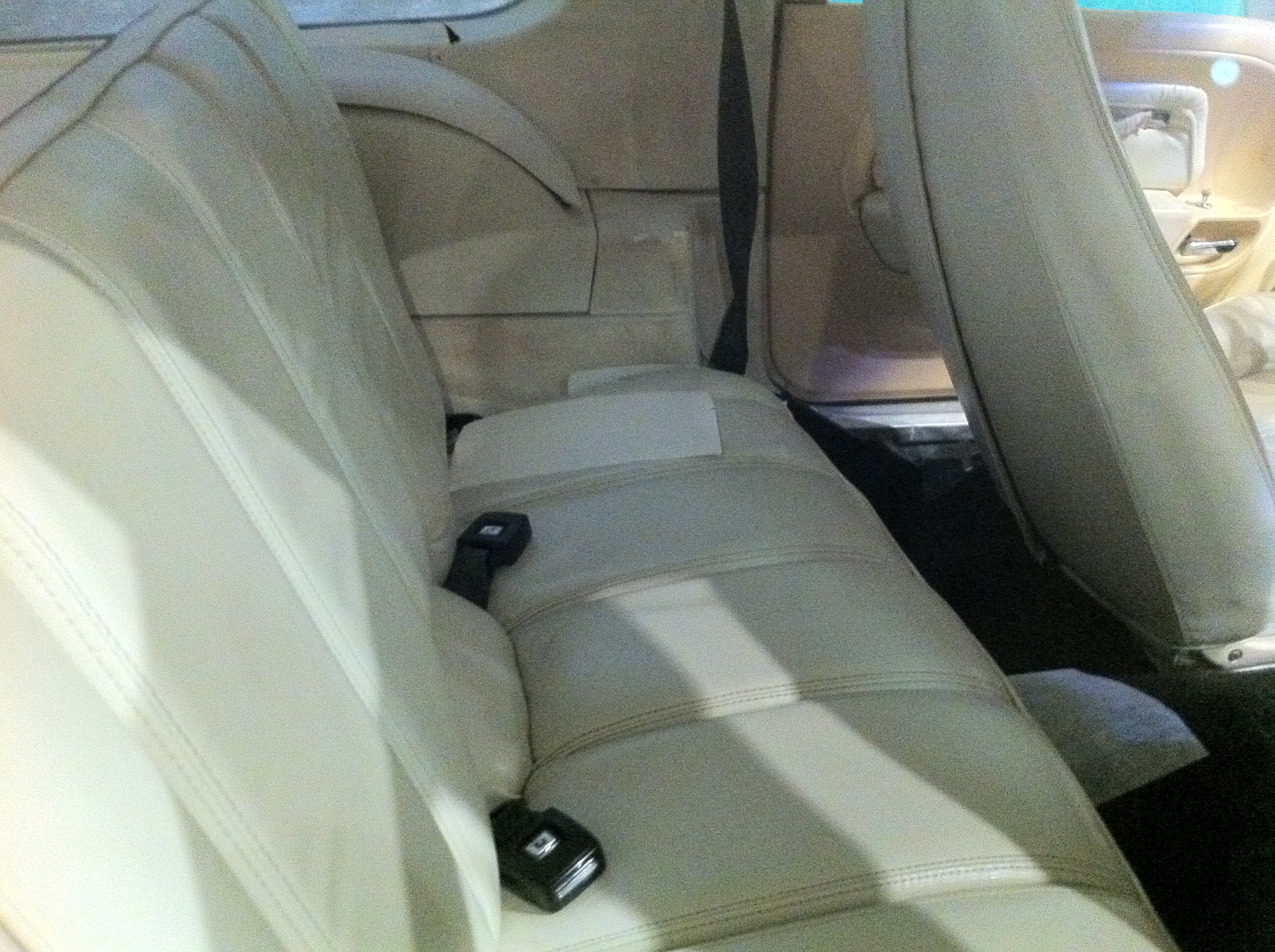
1975 Pacer X

In the August 1976 issue of Motor Trend, a follow-up review featured testers who remained "smitten" with the Pacer: "Even with its compact exterior dimensions, the Pacer is one of the most comfortable 4-passenger cars around...The wide bucket seats were firm, but very comfortable..." They noted that rear legroom actually exceeded that of luxury "full-sizers" like the Buick Riviera and the Continental Mark IV.". However, they criticized the lack of a four-speed transmission and the sluggish performance of Pacers equipped with the single-barrel carburetor.

When the Pacer was exported to the UK, The Motor, a weekly automobile magazine, was critical, describing: "We test the Pacer – and wish we hadn't."

Popular Mechanics described the introduction of the 1977 station wagon as a "styling coup," with the magazine enthusiastically asking, "Who needs the coupe!". The Pacer has been described as "amazingly versatile and quite advanced for the times".

As the years progressed and the mechanical underpinnings aged, initial enthusiasm shifted toward criticism of its performance and weight. By 1978, the initial excitement had cooled. As competitors introduced lighter, front-wheel-drive models, critics increasingly focused on the Pacer's lack of power and poor fuel economy.

In the decades since production ended, the Pacer has been re-evaluated as one of the most polarizing yet "audacious" designs in history and "the automotive press loved it". Recent retrospectives in Hemmings Classic Car magazine describe the Pacer as an "intriguing" and "brave" attempt to redefine the American car, concluding that "you don't get cars like this any more".

== In popular culture ==
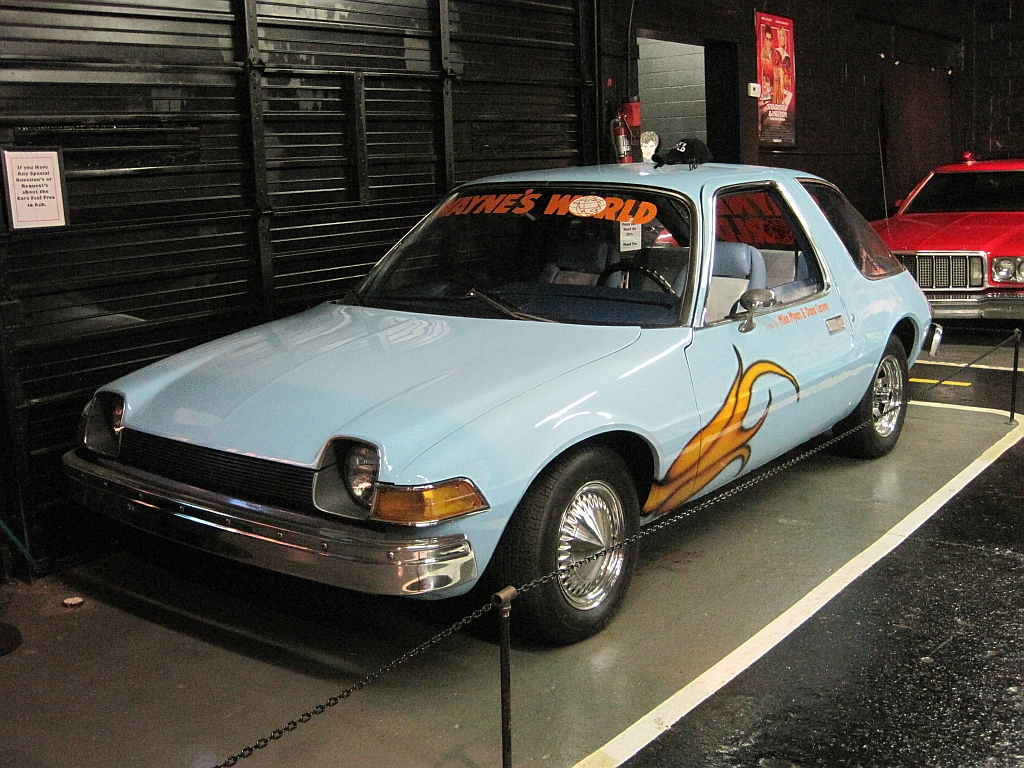
Wayne's World Pacer

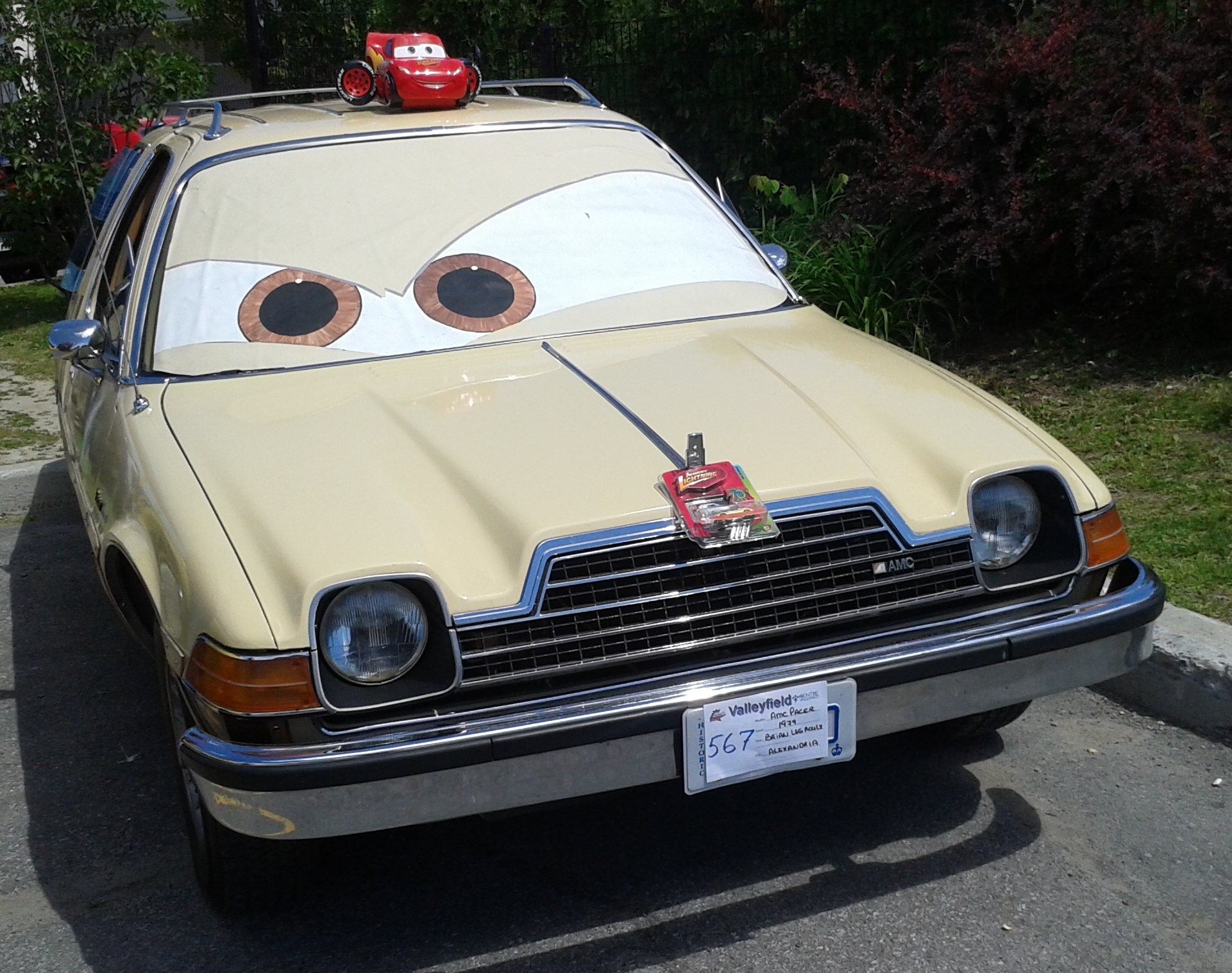
Windshield cover to resemble Cars movie character

The AMC Pacer, characterized by its "fishbowl" glass area and wide, rounded proportions, became a symbol of 1970s eccentricity in popular culture. Originally marketed as the "car of tomorrow," its design has since transformed from a "disastrous" automotive punchline to a celebrated cult icon.

In 1976, an AMC Pacer X was used as product placement in the hit French film The Wing or the Thigh (L'aile ou la cuisse), driven by the French actor Coluche.

The Golden Girls sitcom during the late 1980s refers to the car's then-tarnished reputation; the character Dorothy was jokingly described as "the biggest disappointment to hit the streets since the AMC Pacer".

The Pacer's most significant cultural reappearance occurred in the 1990s, where it transitioned from an "ugly duckling" to a cinematic star, often used to signify nostalgia or youthful counter-culture.

Wayne's World and Wayne's World 2 include perhaps the most famous Pacer in history: the 1976 "Mirthmobile" driven by Wayne Campbell and Garth Algar. Finished in bright blue with flame decals on the body sides, the car featured a mismatched wheel set (stock covers in the front and aftermarket chrome-plated steel wheels in the rear), and a custom ceiling-mounted licorice dispenser. The car became a central prop for the film's "performance of the seventies for the nineties," notably during a sing-along with the "Bohemian Rhapsody" by the rock band Queen. After the movie's Pacer sat unused for two decades, it was restored to its movie specifications and sold for $37,000 at the 2016 Barrett-Jackson auction.

In the animated film, A Goofy Movie, Goofy's much-abused family car is a stylized, cartoonish version of a 1978 Pacer station wagon. Director Kevin Lima chose the design because his elementary school was located near an AMC dealership.

The Good Burger features a blue 1976 Pacer modified into the "Burgermobile," with a massive hamburger on the hood, pickle-themed hubcaps, and illuminated red arrows for turn signals. After falling into disrepair, the vehicle was restored by a collector in Daytona Beach, Florida. It was sold in 2019 to the owner of the Hi-Pointe Drive-In in St. Louis, Missouri.

In Cars 2, the Pacer was introduced to a new generation via the character "Acer" and a group of fellow 1975 Pacers who served as the film's "lemon" antagonists.

Cultural retrospectives highlight that the Pacer was "years ahead of mainstream thinking" in terms of pedestrian-friendly design and space-efficient urban transport. While it was the "butt of jokes" for decades due to its fishbowl appearance and perceived lack of power, it is now ranked in lists of the "Cars In Movies That Became Pop-Culture Icons".

== Legacy ==
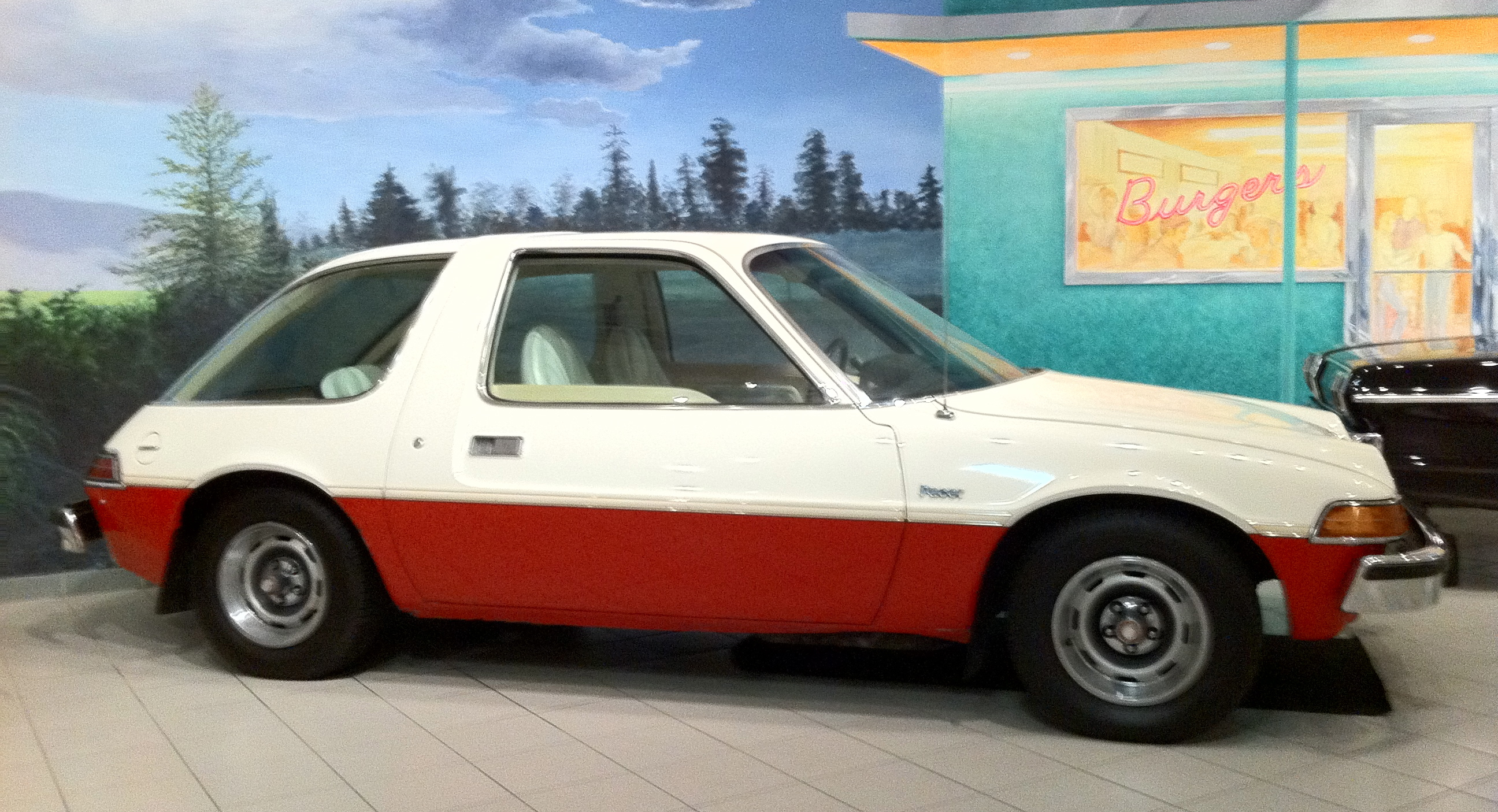
1975 AMC Pacer in the AACA Museum collection

The AMC Pacer was one of the first American compact cars introduced during the 1970s fuel crisis. It has "inevitable quirks ... it remains a tangible slice of automobile history." The marketplace was changing, and AMC developed an innovative and unconventional design that "collectors often value cars that represent significant moments in automotive history".

Hemmings Motor News noted that small cars have always played a role in U.S. automotive history, and that "among those produced during the late Seventies, the AMC Pacer was an economical giant, in a manner of speaking." Now old enough to be a "classic car", the Pacer has come to be regarded in some quarters as a 1970s design icon. According to Business Week, the 1970s were "infamous for disco, Watergate and some of the ugliest cars ever." The "roly-poly" Pacer was one of the few of that era that had "real personalities" and it embodies a sense of "artful desperation" making it "stand out from the crowd and epitomize at once the best and worst of the seventies".

According to CNN Money, Pacer values are on the rise. Cars of the 1970s era such as the Pacer are becoming collector's items. Business Week magazine reported that the rising values of so-called "nerd cars"—ugly 1970s-era cars—prompted the CEO of a major collector-car insurance company to buy a Pacer which has "inexplicably appreciated substantially beyond the $2,300 that he paid for it in 2004." The innovative AMC Pacers "are finally getting the respect they deserve". The car has also become recognized by collectors in Europe.

Several national and regional AMC automobile clubs provide owner support. Pacers share the drivetrain as well as some parts and components with other AMC models, while new old stock (NOS), used, and some reproduction parts are available from vendors specializing in AMC vehicles.
