= Stinger (comics) =

Stinger, in comics may refer to:

- Stinger, a member in the Alliance of Evil in Marvel Comics
- Stinger, a member of Genetix in the Marvel UK comics
- Stinger, the alias of Cassandra Lang in the Marvel Comics 2 universe
- Stinger, fought the Avengers in Avengers #179-180 (January-February 1979)
- Stinger, a clone of Scott Lang that fought the Heroes for Hire in Heroes for Hire #12 (June 1998)
- Stinger, an enemy of the Golden Age Angel, who also appeared in Marvel Super-Heroes vol. 3 #7 (October 1991)
- Stinger, a Decepticon (KSI Drone) from Transformers: Age of Extinction
