= Stung =

Stung may refer to:

- Stung (1931 film)
- Stung (2015 film)

== See also ==
- Sting (disambiguation)
