= Marionette (disambiguation) =

A marionette is a type of puppet moved by strings.

Marionette or similar terms may also refer to:

== Film ==
- Marionettes (1925 film), an American fantasy film directed by Henri Diamant-Berger
- Marionettes (film), a 1936 Soviet film directed by Yakov Protazanov
- Marionette (1939 film), an Italian film
- Marionette (2017 film), a South Korean film
- Marionette (2020 film), a Dutch–Luxembourgish film, winner of the Golden Calf for Best Production Design

== Music ==
- Marionette (band), a Swedish metal band
- Marionette (EP), by Stellar, 2014
  - "Marionette" (song), the title song
- "Marionette", a song by Ayumi Hamasaki from Guilty, 2008
- "Marionette", a song by Red Velvet from Bloom, 2022
- "Marionette", a song by Soul Asylum from Hang Time, 1988
- "Marionette", a song by Tzlil Klifi, 2022

== Other ==
- The Marionettes (1963), a puppet play by Bahram Beyzai
- Marionette, the former name for Presto, the in-house proprietary 3D animation software created and used by Disney Pixar
- "Marionettes, Inc.", a short story by Ray Bradbury from his collection of short stories, The Illustrated Man
- Marionette (show), a breakdancing performance created and performed by Expression
- "Marionette" (Fringe), an episode of the television series Fringe
- "Marionettes", an episode of the television series The Crown
- Sandrone, a character in Genshin Impact who uses the title "Marionette"
- Marionette, a character who appears in Marvel Comics as a member of the Micronauts
- The Marionette, a character in the Five Nights at Freddy's franchise
- Marionette (Devil May Cry), a low-class demon in the video game Devil May Cry

== See also ==
- Marinette (disambiguation)
