= Sting =

Sting may refer to:

- Stinger or sting, a structure of an animal to inject venom, or the injury produced by a stinger
- Irritating hairs or prickles of a stinging plant, or the plant itself

== Fictional characters and entities ==
- Sting (Middle-earth), a fictional sword in J. R. R. Tolkien's The Hobbit and The Lord of the Rings
- Sting Oakley, a character in Gundam Seed Destiny
- Sting (DC Comics), a fictional character from DC Comics
- Peter Stanchek (comics), a character nicknamed "Sting" in the Valiant Comics universe
- Trixie Sting, a character in the TV series Slugterra
- Kamen Rider Sting, a character in the TV series Kamen Rider Dragon Knight
- Sting (film), a 2024 horror movie

== Music ==
- Sting (musical phrase), a short sequence of music used in films and TV as a form of punctuation
- Sting (percussion), a brief burst of percussion to punctuate a joke
- Sting (EP), 2016, by Stellar
- Stings (album), 2023, by Kamaal Williams
- "Sting" (Eric Saade song), 2015
- "Sting" (Fletcher song), 2022
- "Sting" (Stellar song), 2016

== People ==
- Sting (musician) (born 1951), English musician and actor
- Sting (wrestler) (born 1959), American professional wrestler and actor
- Cheeseekau or Sting (1760–1792), war chief of the Kispoko division of the Shawnee Nation
- Sting International, stage name of American musician Shaun Pizzonia (born 1968)

== Science ==
- Stimulator of interferon genes (STING), a protein
- Sting, a plant disease caused by Belonolaimus longicaudatus

== Sports teams ==
- Arizona Sting, an NLL lacrosse team (2004–2007)
- Charlotte Sting, a WNBA basketball team (1997–2006)
- Chicago Sting, an American soccer team (1975–1988)
- Las Vegas Sting, now the Anaheim Piranhas, an Arena Football League team (1994–1995)
- Sarnia Sting, an Ontario Hockey League junior team
- Southern Sting, a New Zealand netball team (1998–2007)
- Trenton Sting, an Ontario Provincial Junior A Hockey League team

== Video gaming ==
- Sting: The Secret Operations, a 2008 online first person shooter
- Sting (company), a video game development company

== Other uses ==
- Sting (fixture), a wind tunnel part
- Sting (horse) (born 1921), an American Thoroughbred racehorse
- Airborne Sting, a hang glider
- Sting Energy Drink, a Filipino/Pakistani energy drink
- Sting operation, a deceptive law enforcement operation to catch a person committing a crime
- The Sting, a caper film
- Sting (drone), Ukrainian loitering munition

== See also ==
- The Sting (disambiguation)
