= Marinette =

Marinette may refer to:

== Places ==
- Marinette, Arizona, a ghost town in Maricopa County, U.S.
- Marinette, Nova Scotia, a community of the Halifax Regional Municipality in Canada
- Marinette, Wisconsin, a city in Wisconsin bordering Michigan, U.S.
- Marinette County, Wisconsin, the county in the northeast corner of Wisconsin, U.S.

== Other uses ==
- Marinette (Vodou), a cruel and vicious loa (spirit) in Haitian Vodou
- Marinette Dupain-Cheng, a.k.a. Ladybug, the female title character of the French animated series Miraculous: Tales of Ladybug & Cat Noir
- Marinette Pichon (born in 1975), a French football player
- Marinette, a 2023 French biographical sports drama about Marinette Pichon
- Marinette Yacht (1954–1991), a line of motor yachts built by Aluminum Cruisers Inc.
- USS Marinette (YTB-791), a 1967 United States Navy harbor tug

== See also ==
- La Marinete, one of the IAI Dagger squadrons in the Argentine air forces in the Falklands War
- Marionette (disambiguation)
