= Vibrato (song) =

Single by Stellar

from the album Sting
- Released: July 20, 2015
- Recorded: 2015
- Genre: K-pop; nu-disco
- Length: 3:02
- Label: The Entertainment Pascal; CJ E&M
- Songwriter: Hwang Hyun
- Producer: Hwang Hyun

Stellar singles chronology
"Fool" (2015)	"Vibrato" (2015)	"Sting" (2016)

"Vibrato" (Korean: 떨려요; RR: tteollyeoyo) is a song recorded by South Korean girl group Stellar and served as their sixth digital single. It was released on July 20, 2015 by The Entertainment Pascal and distributed by CJ E&M. It was written and produced by Hwang Hyun, member of MonoTree. The song was later included in their second extended play Sting (2016).

== Background and release ==
On July 1, 2015, it was announced that the group will be making a comeback with a digital single on July 20. On July 9 it was revealed the first group image with the new concept, meanwhile on July 13 and July 14, music video teasers were posted online on their official Twitter account. On July 20 the song was released online in several music portals, such as MelOn and iTunes, along with the music video. The song and music video were scheduled to be released at noon, as most releases of the industry, but the record company decided to postpone the launch for later that day, citing creative reasons. The music video was rated 19+ by CJ E&M distributor, seen as provocative and unsuited for minors.

== Commercial performance ==
The song entered and peaked at number 97 on the Gaon Digital Chart with 20,803 downloads sold for the week ending July 25, 2015.

== Track listing ==
No.	Title	Lyrics	Music	Arrangement	Length
1.	"Vibrato" (떨려요; tteollyeoyo)	Hwang Hyun	Hwang Hyun	Hwang Hyun	3:02
Total length:					3:02

== Charts ==
Chart (2016)	Peak position
South Korea (Gaon)	97
