= Cry (Stellar single) =

Single by Stellar
- B-side: "Ringtone"
- Released: July 18, 2016
- Recorded: 2016
- Length: 3:19
- Label: The Entertainment Pascal; Universal Music
- Songwriters: Brave Brothers; Chakun
- Producers: Brave Brothers; Chakun; Two Champ

Stellar singles chronology
"Sting" (2016)	"Cry" (2016)	"Archangels of the Sephiroth" (2017)

Music video
- "Crying" on YouTube

"Cry" is a single album recorded by South Korean girl group Stellar. It was released as their seventh single album and ninth single overall. The song was released on July 18, 2016 by The Entertainment Pascal and distributed by Universal Music. In order to promote the song, Stellar appeared in several South Korean music programs, including Music Bank and Inkigayo. A music video for the song was also released on July 18.

The EP was a commercial success peaking at number 16 on the Gaon Album Chart.

== Background and release ==
On May 20, 2016, it was reported that Stellar was making a comeback in early July with a new song, after six months since the last single, "Sting". On July 8, it was reported that a minor car accident occurred during the filming for the music video for the upcoming title track, resulting in a visit to the hospital with no major injuries.

On July 10, The Entertainment Pascal officially announced that the group will be releasing a song called "Crying" on July 18, revealing teaser images of each member. On July 13 a music video teaser was released and the track list was also released, revealing that the song will be produced by Brave Brothers. On July 15 a second music video teaser was released.

On July 18 the song was released online in several music portals in South Korea, such as MelOn, along with the music video.

== Promotion ==
The music video for "Crying" was released on July 18, 2016 in conjunction with the single. They made their official comeback stage on SBS MTV's The Show performing their title track "Crying". They also perform on Show Champion on July 19, M Countdown on July 20, Music Bank on July 21, Music Core on July 22 and on Inkigayo on July 23.

== Chart performance ==
"Cry" entered and peaked at number 16 on the Gaon Album Chart on the chart issue dated July 17–23, 2016. In its second week, the song charted at number 34. In its third consecutive week, the single album charted at number 61.

== Track listing ==
No.	Title	Lyrics	Music	Arrangement	Length
1.	"Intro"	Brave Brothers, Chakun	Brave Brothers, Two Champ, Chakun	Two Champ	1:10
2.	"Crying" (펑펑울었어; peongpeong-ul-eoss-eo)	Brave Brothers, Chakun	Brave Brothers, Two Champ, Chakun	Two Champ	3:19
3.	"Ringtone" (벨소리; belsoli)	Chakun	Two Champ	Two Champ	3:05
Total length:					7:34

== Charts ==
=== Weekly charts ===
Chart (2016)	Peak position
South Korea (Gaon Album Chart)	16

=== Single charts ===
'Crying'

Chart (2016)	Peak position	Sales
South Korean Gaon Weekly Singles Chart	116	17,592+ (digital downloads only)
South Korean Gaon Weekly Download Chart	105	17,592+ (digital downloads only)

== Release history ==
Region	Date	Format	Label
South Korea	July 18, 2016	Digital download	The Entertainment Pascal, Universal Music
South Korea	July 21, 2016	CD	The Entertainment Pascal, Universal Music
