= AGARD =

NATO agency (1952-1996)

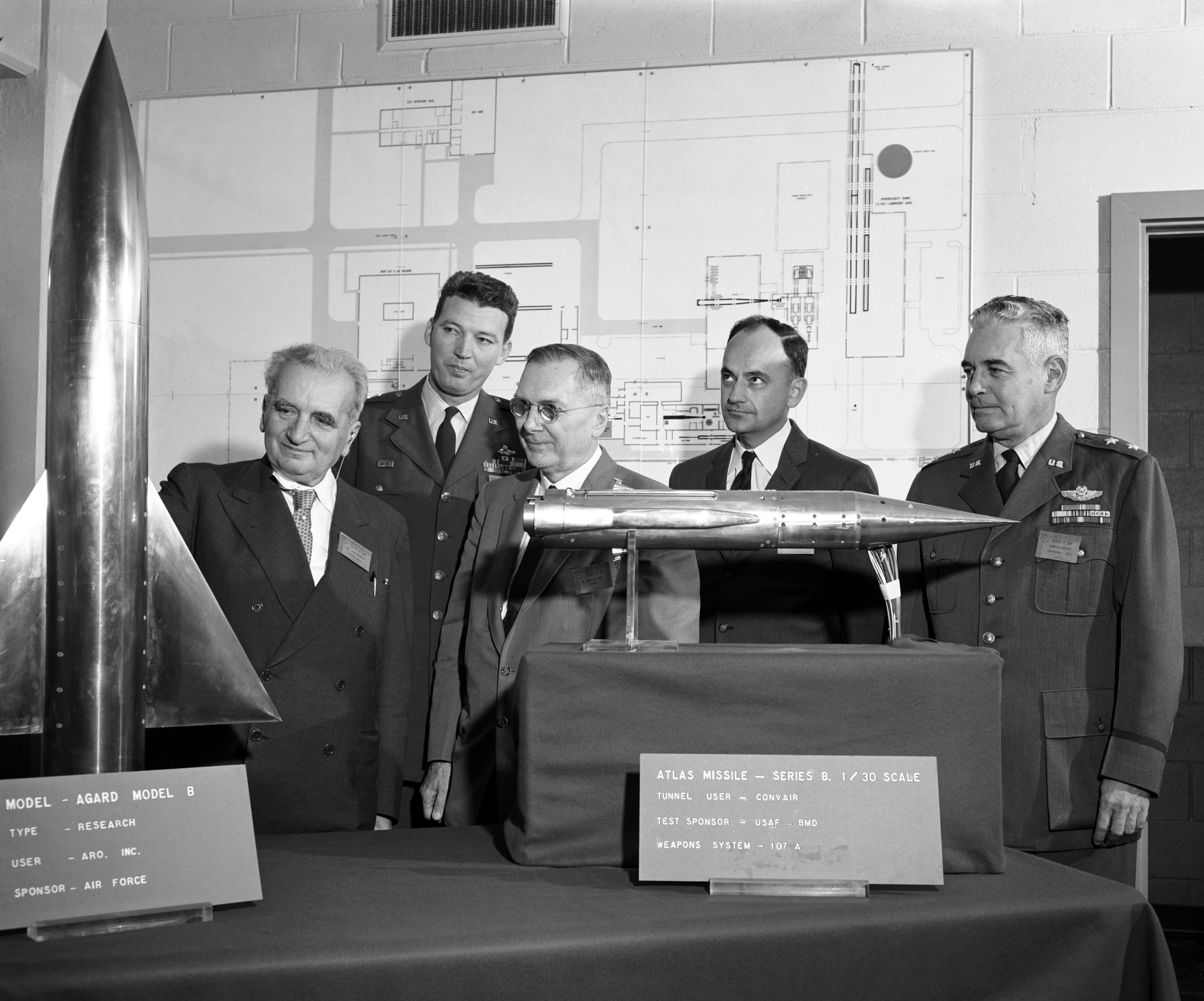
Theodore von Kármán, left, is joined by Air Force and NASA officials while inspecting two of the models used in the high velocity, high altitude wind tunnels at Arnold Air Force Base. The missiles are AGARD-B and Atlas Series B. (1959)

The Advisory Group for Aerospace Research and Development (AGARD) was an agency of NATO that existed from 1952 to 1996.

AGARD was founded as an Agency of the NATO Military Committee. It was set up in May 1952 with headquarters in Neuilly sur Seine, France.

In a mission statement in the 1982 History it published, the purpose involved "bringing together the leading personalities of the NATO nations in the fields of science and technology relating to aerospace". The Advisory Group was organized by panels:

Aerospace medical, avionics, electromagnetic wave propagation, flight mechanics, fluid dynamics, guidance and control, propulsion and energetics, structures and materials, and technical information.

In 1958 Theodore von Kármán hired Moe Berg to accompany him to the AGARD conference in Paris. "AGARD's aim was to encourage European countries to develop weapons technology on their own instead of relying on the U.S. defense industry to do it for them."

== Activities ==
There were annual meetings, frequently in Paris, but also in Delft, Turin, Cambridge, Washington DC. The Advisory Group administered a consultant and exchange program including lecture series and technical panels.

The AGARD publishing program included a multilingual aeronautical dictionary, about ninety titles per year, with a normal run of 1200. An Agardograph is a work prepared by, or on behalf of, AGARD's panels. For example, an agardograph on the AGARD-B wind tunnel model was prepared.

Later examples of AGARD studies include such topics as non-lethal weapons, theatre ballistic missile defence, protection of large aircraft in peace support operations, and limiting collateral damage caused by air-delivered weapons. AGARD was also one of the first NATO organizations to cooperate with Russia in a mutual exchange of information dealing with flight safety.

AGARD merged with the NATO Defence Research Group (DRG) in 1996 to become the NATO Research and Technology Organisation (RTO).

== See also ==
- Aeronautics
