= Stellar (group) =

South Korean girl group

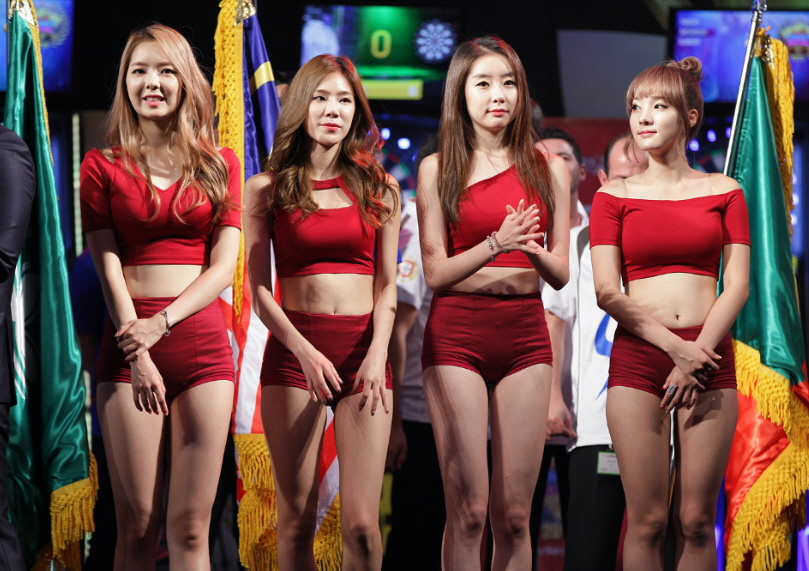
- Stellar at the Phoenix Summer Festival in October 2015. From left to right: Hyoeun, Jeonyul, Gayoung and Minhee.

Background information
- Origin: Seoul, South Korea
- Genres: K-pop; synthpop; dance-pop
- Years active: 2011–2018
- Label: The Entertainment Pascal
- Past members: Minhee; Hyoeun; Soyoung; Youngheun; Leeseul; JoA; Gayoung; Jeonyul
- Website: The Entertainment Pascal

Stellar (Korean: 스텔라) was a South Korean girl group whose final lineup was composed of Minhee, Hyoeun, Soyoung and Youngheun that disbanded in 2018. Formed in 2011 by The Entertainment Pascal, (Note: Following Eric Mun's contract expiration with Top Class Entertainment in late 2013, the company renamed itself as The Entertainment Pascal.) the group attracted attention as they were initially produced by Eric Mun of the boy band Shinhwa.

Following an unsuccessful debut with the single "Rocket Girl" in August 2011, Stellar underwent a line-up change and released "UFO" in February 2012, which fared similarly. The group began working with production team MonoTree in July 2013 and released "Study", which experienced modest success and became their first single to chart in the top 100 of the Gaon Digital Chart. (Note: MonoTree was formed in 2014 by Hwang Hyun, G-High and Lee Joo-hyoung, former composers and writers of the production team Sweetune. "Study" is credited to the latter.)

Stellar gained notoriety in February 2014, when they adopted a more "provocative" image for the release of their first extended play Marionette. The album's title track peaked at number thirty-five on the Gaon Digital Chart, making it their most commercially successful single. This stylistic change in direction would be maintained in Stellar's subsequent releases "Vibrato" in 2015 and their second extended play Sting in 2016.

== Career ==
=== 2011–2014: Formation, debut and line-up changes ===
The formation of Stellar began as early as 2010, originally supposed to be a six-membered group with a former trainee from Japan, but Top Class Entertainment reported that member Kim Gayoung had signed an exclusive contract with the company and would be joining a five-member girl group. Gayoung had gained attention for her appearance on the Viewers' Tour episode of 1 Night 2 Days and had been cast in the drama series Poseidon alongside Top Class Entertainment operator and Shinhwa member Eric Mun. The series was set to air on the SBS network until production halted following the November 2010 Yeonpyeong bombardment incident. The roles were subsequently recast when production was greenlit by KBS a year later. Gayoung was later cast in the 2011 drama Spy Myung-wol along with Mun.

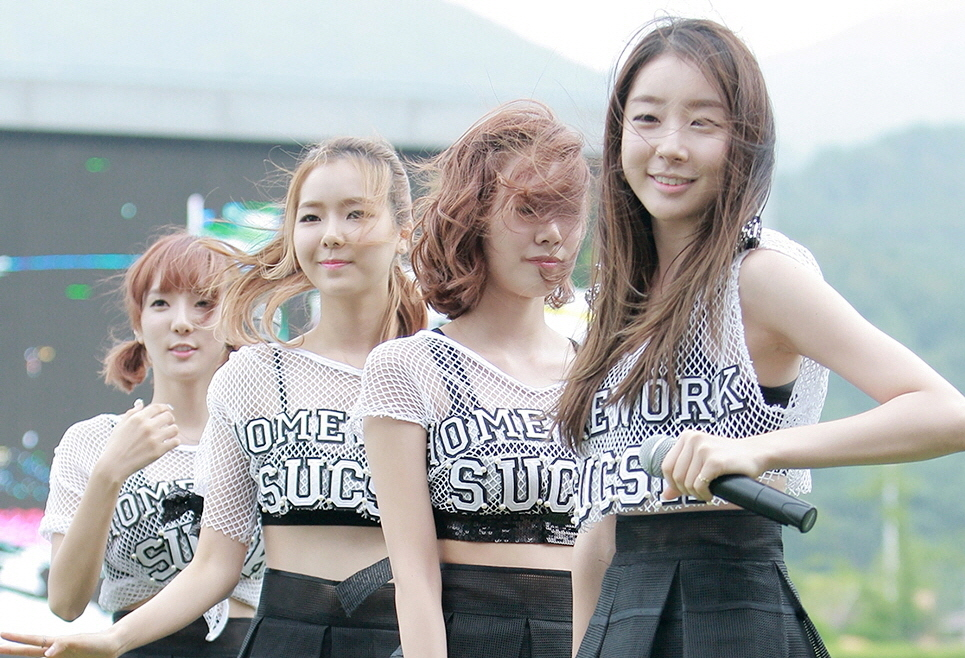
Stellar in February 2013.

The final debut line-up of Stellar was Gayoung, true rookie Jeon-yul, and ex-Honeydew members Lee-seul and JoA. The group officially debuted on August 28, 2011, with the release of the digital single "Rocket Girl". On January 26, 2012, it was announced that Lee-seul and JoA were leaving the group and would be replaced by Min-hee and Hyo-eun for their first comeback track "UFO".

On July 11, 2013, Stellar released their third digital single "Study" which, and chart in the top 100 their first time.

On February 12, 2014, Stellar released their first extended play Marionette. The group received criticism for their "stripping game" promotion, which involved fans having to "like" posts on Stellar's official Facebook page to reveal photos of the members' body parts. The group received further criticism for their 19+ music video and performances of "Marionette". Despite the controversy, "Marionette" became their best selling single, peaking at number 35 and 34 on Gaon and Billboard K-Pop Hot 100 charts, respectively.

On August 21, 2014, Stellar released the digital single "Mask".

=== 2015—2016: Breakthrough and identical sexual crisis controversy ===
On March 9, 2015, Stellar released the digital single "Fool" and its music video. The MV shows the members reacting to the negative comments of their past comebacks.

On July 20, 2015, Stellar released the single "Vibrato" and another more controversial music video, gaining more recognition. The group responded to criticism of their revealing performance outfits with the explanation that "Vibrato"'s sexy music video was merely meant to be an expression of the group's unique identity. While promoting "Vibrato", Stellar released a virtual reality clip of a July 27 performance. The video – created by virtual reality company Moovr – allows viewers to use their computer mouse or move their smartphone to scroll around a 360-degree rotating view of the stage as the four members perform.

On January 8, 2016, it was announced that the group would return on January 18 with their second EP titled Sting. The album's creation was supported in part through a Makestar-hosted crowd-funding campaign. The campaign's original goal of $8,418 was reached in only three days, ultimately reaching 422% of its goal with $35,510. On January 18, 2016, the album and a music video for the title track "Sting" were released. The band explained that their intentions for "Sting" were different from "Marionette" and "Vibrato", stating "This time, we wanted to look more like a girlfriend rather than to [...] look provocative. We put on lighter makeup so that more fans will feel closer to us." The previously released single "Vibrato" was included as the final track on the album.

Stellar announced on April 1 that they would be holding their first solo concert, since their debut, on April 22, 2016, at Seoul's Yes24 MUVHALL. They brought to their fans a range of unique performances, including hit songs like "Marionette" and "Sting". The concert was live-streamed on various websites such as Allreh TV, Allreh TV mobile and Goliveconcert.com.

On July 10, 2016, it was officially announced that the group would be releasing their seventh single album called "Cry" on July 18, posting the date of release and the first teaser images for the single through their official Twitter account. This project was also supported, in part, by a Makestar crowd-funding project which raised $53,593 (532% of its original goal).

They went on to hold a second concert, entitled 'Stellar 2nd Concert: After Story' on December 3, 2016, while also debuting in Japan with a showcase in Tokyo on August 27 and a concert on December 24.

=== 2017: Last activities and disbandment ===
Stellar ended 2016 by launching a third Makestar fundraising event in support of their third mini-album on December 26. By the time the project finished they had reached 1,132% of their original goal, making them the first group on Makestar to achieve over 1,000%. On March 25, 2017, Stellar held a special fansign in the city of Fortaleza, Brazil. On March 26, 2017, Stellar was the first Korean girl group to hold a solo concert in Brazil, playing for a sold-out crowd of almost 1,000 people.

On May 17, it was reported that their new material was to be released in late June. It was also revealed that a new member could possibly join the line-up with their new release. On May 18, The Entertainment Pascal confirmed the addition of a new member, So-young, via Stellar's Makestar Project. On June 20, The Entertainment Pascal announced that the group's new EP was set to be released on June 27 and was titled Stellar Into the World, with the title track "Archangels of the Sephiroth". The teasers for the release showed an Angel vs. Witch theme, represented by mirroring photos where one had a light theme and the other had a dark theme. This theme was confirmed by both the tags used for the teaser images on social media and in a radio interview starring Stellar.

On August 22, it was announced that the group would be holding a special anniversary concert titled "Interstellar: Time Travel Through 6 Years" on August 28. On August 23, The Entertainment Pascal announced of the graduations of Gayoung and Jeonyul.

On August 25, Stellar announced the addition of a new member, Youngheun.

On September 30, members Youngheun and Soyoung were seen in YG Entertainment's teaser for Mix Nine, a show that would create a temporary boy or girl group, but neither member made it past the auditions.

On February 22, 2018, the members posted to social media about how they had arranged their final fan meeting for the group, to be held on February 25, 2018. Also on February 22, Gayoung tweeted "People who play with other people's emotions are the worst!", to which Hyoeun replied "True". Many fans took this to mean that the members were expressing their mistreation of their company.

On February 26, it was announced that the group had disbanded due to graduation of Minhee and Hyoeun, Shortly after the disbandment, Minhee revealed that she shortly addressed and apologized to the fans as well Minhee and Hyoeun gave an interview where she apologized to the group's fans and assured them there was no discord among the members. She stated that Jeonyul and Gayoung were looking to move into acting, but she and Hyoeun had not decided what they were going to do yet.

=== 2018: Post-disbandment, reunion, and revealing the difficulties as idols ===
On October 30, 2018, Minhee released a video of Stellar's first reunion party after disbandment through her YouTube channel "About Mini". Gayoung, Minhee, Hyoeun and Jeonyul attended the event. Minhee explained that the reunion party was created thanks to fans.

On October 29, 2018, An SBS Special Documentary was released about the life of idols. A segment on Gayoung and Stellar revealed the difficulties members faced while being a part of Stellar, as well as showing some of the story after the disbandment of the group. The segment focused on Gayoung and her pursuit of being an actress, while running a cafe.

In an interview with Insight on December 17, 2018, Gayoung revealed the difficulties that she and her members faced from performing the sexy concept, from both the perception of the public, as well as the pressure that their company placed on members to do what the company wanted, whenever the members said that they didn't want to do a particular thing (such as a particular concept). When asked if she would be an idol again, Gayoung responded that "I don't think I would do it again". She concluded the interview with advice to new aspiring idols, that while it is important to work hard, the direction in which you are pursuing is important too.

After the Insight interview there was an immense response in the comments left for members both on the Insight interview video, as well as the Stellar reunion party video. In a response to the comments left on Stellar's first reunion party video, Minhee released a Q&A video on January 13, 2019. In response to a question about how much members earned from their work during Stellar, it was revealed that each member earned less than 10,000,000 Won (~US$9,000) over the 7 years they worked under their company.

On August 28, 2019, it was revealed that Youngheun has become a member of Rania.

In October 2020, Gayoung participated in MBN's Miss Back.

== Members ==
- Leeseul (이슬) (2011–2012)
- JoA (조아) (2011–2012)
- Gayoung (가영) (2011-2017)
- Jeonyul (전율) (2011–2017)
- Minhee (민희) (2012–2017)
- Hyoeun (효은) (2012–2017)
- Soyoung (소영) (2017–2018)
- Youngheun (영혼) (2017–2018) (Note: Youngheun was intended to debut as a member of Stellar, but however the group disbanded without ever getting her a promotions on their album.)

== Discography ==
=== Extended plays ===
Title	Album details	Peak chart positions		Sales
Title	Album details	KOR	US World	Sales
Marionette	Released: February 12, 2014; Label: Top Class Entertainment, CJ E&M; Format: CD, digital download	19	—	KOR: 2,433
Sting	Released: January 18, 2016; Label: The Entertainment Pascal, Universal Music; Format: CD, digital download	13	—	KOR: 3,740
Stellar Into the World	Released: June 27, 2017 (digital) July 14, 2017 (physical); Label: The Entertainment Pascal, Genie Music; Format: CD, digital download	40	13	KOR: 1,794
"—" denotes releases that did not chart or were not released in that region.

=== Single albums ===
List of single albums, with selected chart positions and sales
Title	Details	Peak chart positions	Sales
Title	Details	KOR	Sales
Cry	Released: July 18, 2016; Labels: The Entertainment Pascal, Universal Music; Formats: CD, digital download	38	KOR: 2,225

=== Singles ===
Title	Year	Peak chart positions	Sales	Album
Title	Year	KOR	Sales	Album
"Rocket Girl"	2011	143	KOR: 42,468	Non-album singles
"UFO"	2012	188	KOR: 24,145	Non-album singles
"Study"	2013	90	KOR: 38,606	Marionette
"Marionette"	2014	35	KOR: 153,557	Marionette
"Mask"	2014	147	KOR: 20,862	Non-album singles
"Fool"	2015	132	KOR: 17,875	Non-album singles
"Vibrato"	2015	97	KOR: 28,222	Sting
"Sting"	2016	90	KOR: 37,271	Sting
"Crying"	2016	116	KOR: 17,200	Cry
"Archangels of the Sephiroth"	2017	—	—N/a	Stellar Into the World
"—" denotes releases that did not chart or were not released in that region.

=== Soundtracks and other features ===
Title	Year	Peak chart position	Album	Notes
Title	Year	KOR	Album	Notes
"Loving U"	2011	194	Spy Myung-wol OST Part.5	
"My Love You"	2015	—	All is Well OST	
"Separation"	2017	—	No Way Out EP	MoonBand ft. Hyoeun
"Summer, Summer"	2017	—	—	Black Star ft. Hyoeun

=== Music videos ===
List of music videos, with directors, showing year released
Year	Title	Director	Alternate version(s)
"Rocket Girl"	2011	Hong Won-ki	
"UFO"	2012	Hong Won-ki	
"Study"	2013	Joo Hee-sun	
"Marionette"	2014	Park Seung-hun	"No Cut" Version
"Mask"	2014	Park Seung-hun	
"Fool"	2015	Lee Sa-gang	
"Vibrato"	2015	Digipedi	Dance Version
"Sting"	2016	Digipedi	Dance Version
"Love Spell"	2016		
"Crying"	2016	Digipedi	
"Archangels of the Sephiroth"	2017		Dance Version

== Concerts ==
- Stellar 1st Concert (April 22, 2016)
- Stellar 2nd Concert: After Story (December 3, 2016)
- Stellar Japan Concert (December 24, 2016)
- FEELZ - Special Stellar in Brazil (March 26, 2017)
- Interstellar: Time Travel Through 6 Years (August 28, 2017)

== Filmography ==
=== Television ===
Year	Title	Channel	Note(s)
2015	Human Documentary People is Good	MBC	Documentary
2018	SBS Special	SBS	Documentary

=== Dramas ===
Year	Title	Channel	Role(s)	Note(s)
2017	Trace of the Hand	Unknown	All - Phonetopia Girls, Hyoeun - Soobin, Jeonyul - Lab Assistant	Web drama
2017	Girl's War	Unknown		Web drama - Trace of the Hand season 2

== Awards and nominations ==
=== Asia Artist Awards ===
Year	Nominee / work	Award	Result
2016	Stellar	Female Idol Group Popularity Award	Nominated

=== Golden Disc Awards ===
Year	Nominee / work	Award	Result
2012	Stellar	Rookie of the Year	Nominated
2012	Stellar	Popularity Award	Nominated
2012	Stellar	Global Popularity Award	Nominated
2012	Stellar	QQ Hot Trend Golden Disc Award	Nominated

=== Mnet Asian Music Awards ===
Year	Nominee / work	Award	Result
2011	"Rocket Girl"	Best New Female Artist	Nominated
2011	Stellar	Artist of the Year	Nominated

=== Seoul Music Awards ===
Year	Nominee / work	Award	Result
2012	Stellar	Rookie of the Year	Nominated
2012	Stellar	Popularity Award	Nominated
2012	Stellar	K-Wave Special Award	Nominated
2015	"Marionette"	Bonsang Award	Nominated
2015	Stellar	Popularity Award	Nominated
2015	Stellar	K-Wave Special Award	Nominated
2015	Stellar	QQ Most Popular K-Star	Nominated
