= The Sting (disambiguation) =

The Sting is a 1973 film starring Paul Newman and Robert Redford.

The Sting may also refer to:

== Film, television and stage ==
- The Sting (1992 film), a Hong Kong action comedy film
- The Sting (musical), based on the 1973 film
- "The Sting" (Futurama), a 2003 TV episode
- "The Sting" (The Legend of Korra), a 2013 TV episode
- "The Sting" (Lovejoy), a 1986 TV episode
- "The Sting" (The Office), a 2010 TV episode
- "The Sting" (Only Murders in the Building), a 2021 TV episode

== Other uses ==
- The Sting (Gabriella Cilmi album), or the title track, 2013
- The Sting (Wu-Tang Clan album), 2002
- The Sting!, a 2001 single player burglary simulator
- WBWC, an American college radio station branded 88.3 FM The Sting
- The Sting Companies (nl), a Dutch clothing company.

== See also ==
- Sting (disambiguation)
