= Stellar Into the World =

EP by Stellar
- Released: June 27, 2017 (digital); July 14, 2017 (physical)
- Length: 17:01
- Label: The Entertainment Pascal; Genie Music
- Producer: John Hallgren; Samuel Waermö; GR8MOON; Rich Jang; Dono S. Rodríguez; Gayoung; Kim Min Seo

Stellar chronology
Sting (2016)	Stellar Into the World (2017)

Singles from Stellar Into the World
- 1. "Archangels of the Sephiroth" Released: June 27, 2017

Music video
- Archangels of the Sephiroth on YouTube

Stellar Into the World is the third and final extended play (EP) by South Korean girl group Stellar. It was released on June 27, 2017, by The Entertainment Pascal and distributed by Genie Music. This marks the only release as a five-member group, with the addition of member Soyoung in May 2017, and the departure of members Jeonyul and Gayoung in August 2017.

This was Stellar's final release before their disbandment in 2018.

== Background and release ==
On December 26, 2016, the group began a fundraising event through Makestar in order to finance their next album. The project reached its original goal on the first day before going on to achieve 1132% of its original target by its end in April 2017. This was the group's third Makestar project.

Stellar Into the World was digitally released on June 27, 2017, through several music portals, including MelOn, and iTunes, for the global market. The EP was expected to be released physically a day later, but due to production problems, was not released as a CD until July 13, 2017. The physical CD comes in two versions, a white "Tree of Sephiroth" version and a black "Tree of Qliphoth" version. Both versions contain a random photocard of one of the members for fans to collect.

== Promotion ==
The group held their first "comeback stage" on SBS MTV's The Show on June 27, 2017, performing their title track. They continued on MBC Music's Show Champion on June 28. They went on to perform on all the major music shows as well as promoting on shows such as Pops in Seoul, Simply K-Pop, Fact In Star and Celuv TV.

=== Single ===
"'Archangels of the Sephiroth" was released as the title track in conjunction with the EP on June 27. A music video teaser was released on June 25. The official music video was released on June 27, through Genie Music official YouTube channel.

== Commercial performance ==
Stellar Into the World debuted at number 19 on the Gaon Album Chart, on the chart issue dated July 9–15, 2017. They later climbed to number 17. The EP also debuted and peaked at number 13 on the US World Albums chart, on the week ending July 15, 2017.

== Track listing ==
Digital download
No.	Title	Lyrics	Music	Arrangement	Length
1.	"Archangels of the Sephiroth" (세피로트의 나무; sepiloteuui namu)	Jon Hallgren; Samuel Waermo; Kiggen	Jon Hallgren; Samuel Waermo		3:06
2.	"Why Me" (왜 때문에; wae ttaemun-e)	GR8MOON; Rich Jang; Dono S.Rodriguez	GR8MOON; Rich Jang; Dono S.Rodriguez	GR8MOON; Rich Jang; Dono S.Rodriguez	3:31
3.	"The Wave"	GR8MOON; Rich Jang; Dono S.Rodriguez	GR8MOON; Rich Jang; Dono S.Rodriguez	GR8MOON; Rich Jang; Dono S.Rodriguez	3:42
4.	"Twinkle"	Gayoung	Gayoung; Kim Min Seo	Kim Min Seo; Moongeun Jo; Gayoung	3:36
5.	"Archangels of the Sephiroth" (Inst.)		Jon Hallgren; Samuel Waermo		3:06
Total length:					17:01

== Charts ==
Chart (2017)	Peak position
South Korea (Gaon Album Chart)	17
US World Albums (Billboard)	13

== Release history ==
Region	Date	Format	Label
South Korea	June 27, 2017	Digital download	The Entertainment Pascal, Genie Music
Worldwide	June 27, 2017	Digital download	The Entertainment Pascal, Genie Music
