= Sting (EP) =

EP by Stellar
- Released: January 18, 2016
- Recorded: 2015
- Genre: K-pop
- Length: 18:03
- Language: Korean
- Label: The Entertainment Pascal

Stellar chronology
Marionette (2014)	Sting (2016)	Stellar Into the World (2017)

Singles from Sting
- 1. "Vibrato" Released: July 20, 2015; 2. "Sting" Released: January 18, 2016

Sting is the second extended play (EP) by South Korean girl group Stellar. The EP consists of five songs and musically incorporates house, dance and pop/rock genres. It was released on January 18, 2016 by The Entertainment Pascal and distributed by Universal Music. To promote the mini-album the group appeared on several South Korean music programs, including Music Bank, Show! Music Core and Inkigayo.

== Background and release ==
On January 8, 2016, it was announced that the group was making a comeback on January 18 with a new album titled Sting. It was also revealed, that the music video for the title track of the same name will be directed by Digipedi, the same video company that directed EXID's "Up & Down" and the choreography will be made by the same choreographer of KARA's "Mister".

From January 11 to January 14, teaser photos of each member were released on their official fan cafe and Twitter account. On January 14, a teaser from the music video of the title track was released. On January 16, the full track list was revealed and on January 17 the full music video was released on their official YouTube channel.

The mini-album was released digitally on January 18 and physically on January 25 by The Entertainment Pascal and distributed by Universal Music.

== Commercial performance ==
Sting entered and peaked at number 13 on the Gaon Album Chart on the chart issue dated January 17–23, 2016. In its second week, the mini-album charted at number 53 on the chart. The EP charted for two consecutive weeks on the chart.

The mini-album placed at number 40 on the Gaon Album Chart for the month of January 2016 with 1,711 physical copies sold.

== Track listing ==
The 2nd Mini Album 'Sting'
No.	Title	Lyrics	Music	Arrangement	Length
1.	"Do You Hear Me?"	NOPARI	NOPARI	NOPARI	0:55
2.	"Sting" (찔려; Jjillyeo)	GDLO,경미	GDLO	GDLO	3:32
3.	"Insomnia"	G-High, Lee Joohyung	G-High, Lee Joohyung	G-High, Lee Joohyung	3:23
4.	"Love Spell"	Shin Agnes	GDLO	GDLO	3:55
5.	"Cinderella" (신데렐라; sindelella)	Gayoung, GDLO	G-high	G-high	3:16
6.	"Vibrato" (떨려요; Tteollyeoyo)				3:02
Total length:					18:03

== Charts ==
=== Weekly charts ===
Chart (2016)	Peak position
South Korea (Gaon Album Chart)	13

=== Monthly charts ===
Chart (2016)	Peak position
South Korea (Gaon Album Chart)	40

=== Sales ===
Country	Sales
South Korea (Gaon)	1,711+ (Physical)

== Release history ==
Region	Date	Format	Label
Worldwide	January 18, 2016	Digital download	The Entertainment Pascal, Universal Music
South Korea	January 18, 2016	Digital download	The Entertainment Pascal, Universal Music
South Korea	January 25, 2016	CD	The Entertainment Pascal, Universal Music
