= Marionette (song) =

Single by Stellar

from the album Marionette
- Released: February 12, 2014
- Recorded: 2014
- Genre: K-pop; dance-pop
- Length: 3:31
- Label: The Entertainment Pascal; Stone Music
- Songwriters: Lee Joohyung; G-High
- Producers: Lee Joohyung; Hong Seunghyun; G-High

Stellar singles chronology
"Study" (2013)	"Marionette" (2014)	"Mask" (2014)

Music video
- "Marionette" on YouTube

"Marionette" (Korean: 마리오네트) is a song recorded by South Korean girl group Stellar for their first EP of the same name. It was released as the album's second single on February 12, 2014. The song was subject of controversy due to its provocative choreography, which was censored on many music shows. It is Stellar's best-selling single thus far, having reached the top 40 on the Gaon Digital Chart.

Professional ratings
Review scores
Source	Rating
IZM	1.5/5 stars

== Background and release ==
After their comeback with the digital single "Study" in 2013, Stellar revealed on February 10, 2014, they would be releasing their first EP Marionette and announced a song of the same name as its title track. "Marionette" was released on February 12 as the second single from the album, which also came out on the same day.

== Composition and lyrical interpretation ==
"Marionette" is described as a retro dance song with groovy drum lines and guitar sounds. It was composed by Lee Joohyung and G-High. The title of the song refers to the lyric's analogy of being pulled around like a puppet for still being in love with someone who is no longer around.

== Music video ==
On February 11, 2014, Stellar released a teaser of the music video for the song, which was fully premiered the next day, on February 12. The video, which was directed by Park Seunghun, features the girls dancing at indoors sets and being sexy while performing day to day actions, such as drinking milk and bathing. On February 15, a "no cut" version of the video was released, showing the full choreography for the song entirely filmed in one shot. The video gained 2 million views on YouTube during its first week.

== Promotion ==
In order to promote the single, the group performed it on a few music shows. The first stage was held on Mnet's M Countdown on February 13, 2014. The promotions continued through KBS's Music Bank on February 14, SBS MTV's The Show on February 18, and MBC Music's Show Champion on February 19. They also performed the song during the 7th SGC Super Live in Seoul on September 13, 2014, along with the singles "Mask" and "Study".

== Commercial performance ==
After only three days of sales, the song landed on the Gaon Digital Chart at number 42 on the issue dated between February 9 and February 15, 2014, selling 45,463 digital copies. It peaked at number 35 on the following week, becoming Stellar's highest-charting single. For the month of February, the song appeared on the monthly edition of the Gaon Digital Chart at number 65, with 106,631 copies sold. On the week of March 1, 2014, "Marionette" appeared on the Billboard's K-Pop Hot 100 at number 34. The song had sold over 153 thousand downloads as of March 2014.

== Controversies ==
During the release of the album's promotional material, The Entertainment Pascal received criticism for involving the group on a "stripping game", where the fans had to like posts on Stellar's official Facebook page in order to reveal parts of their bodies in blurred out photos. According to the agency, the activity was part of the song's concept of being a marionette and doing whatever the puppet master wants you to do. Despite the explanation, the game was compared to sexual exploration, which caused the agency to delete all the posts related to the issue.

=== Ban and censorship ===
As soon as the music video for "Marionette" was released, it became restricted to ages below 18 in all South Korea and on YouTube. It was also banned from local television due to its provocative choreography and the members' revealing clothes. The controversy also affected the group's appearances on music shows. For most of their stages, portions of the dance had to be toned down as they were considered too vulgar, one of them being the infamously known "butt-rub" move, where the girls scratch their butts to the audience. Despite the overall censorship, the group was allowed to perform the original choreography for the song on their Show Champion stages.

== Charts ==
=== Weekly charts ===
Chart (2014)	Peak position	Ref.
South Korea (Gaon Digital Chart)	35	
United States (K-Pop Hot 100)	34	

=== Monthly charts ===
Chart (2014)	Peak position	Ref.
South Korea (Gaon Digital Chart)	65	

== Release history ==
Region	Date	Format	Label	Ref.
South Korea	February 12, 2014	Digital download	The Entertainment Pascal, Stone Music Entertainment	
Worldwide	February 12, 2014	Digital download	The Entertainment Pascal, Stone Music Entertainment	
