= Marionette (EP) =

EP by Stellar
- Released: February 12, 2014
- Recorded: 2013–2014
- Genre: K-pop; pop; dance-pop
- Length: 21:22
- Language: Korean
- Label: The Entertainment Pascal; Stone Music
- Producer: GDLO; G-High; Lee Joohyung; Hong Seunghyun; Hwang Hyun

Stellar chronology
Marionette (2014)	Sting (2016)

Singles from Marionette
- 1. "Study" Released: July 11, 2013; 2. "Marionette" Released: February 12, 2014

Marionette is the debut extended play (EP) by South Korean girl group Stellar. It was released on February 12, 2014, with the lead single "Marionette" used to promote the EP. "Marionette" became their best-selling single, peaking at number 35 and 34 on the Gaon and Billboard K-Pop Hot 100 charts, respectively.

== Background and release ==
In January 2014, The Entertainment Pascal announced Stellar would release a debut mini album. On February 11, 2014, they posted the first teaser for Marionette.

On February 12, 2014, Stellar released the video for their debut album's title song, "Marionette".

== Track listing ==
No.	Title	Lyrics	Music	Arrangement	Length
1.	"T.I.E"	GDLO	GDLO	GDLO	1:12
2.	"Marionette" (마리오네트)	Song Sooyoon	G-High; Lee Joohyung	G-High; Joohyung; Hong Seunghyun	3:31
3.	"Guilty"	Hwang Hyun	Hyun	Hyun; Seunghyun	3:18
4.	"Take It All" (가져 너 다; Gajyeo Neo Da)	Sooyoon	G-High; Joohyung	G-High; Joohyung; Seunghyun	3:25
5.	"Study" (공부하세요; Gongbuhaseyo)	Sooyoon	G-High; Joohyung	G-High; Joohyung	3:14
6.	"Marionette" (instrumental)				3:29
7.	"Study" (remix version)			GDLO^{[a]}	3:12
Total length:					21:22

Notes

- ^{^a} signifies a remixer
