= Sting (Stellar song) =

Single by Stellar

from the album Sting
- Released: January 18, 2016
- Recorded: 2015
- Genre: K-pop; dance; tropical house
- Length: 3:32
- Label: The Entertainment Pascal
- Songwriter(s): GDLO
- Producer(s): GDLO

Stellar singles chronology
"Vibrato" (2015)	"Sting" (2016)	"Cry" (2016)

"Sting" is a song recorded by South Korean girl group Stellar for their second extended play of the same name. The song was released on January 18, 2016 as the title track from the EP. It was produced and written by GDLO (MonoTree), who also worked on other songs for the EP. The music video was released on January 18 and a dance version on January 23, 2016.

"Sting" was described as an uptempo tropical house dance track. The music video for the song placed at number 7 of Billboard's Most Viewed K-Pop Videos in America for January 2016 and at number 10 Around the World.

To promote the song and the EP, Stellar made several appearances on music programs including M Countdown, Music Bank, Show! Music Core and Inkigayo among others around January and February 2016. The song had moderate success in South Korea, peaking at number 90 on the Gaon Digital Chart.

== Commercial performance ==
"Sting" entered and peaked at number 90 on the Gaon Digital Chart for the week ending January 23, 2016. On the same week, the song entered and peaked at number 57 on the Gaon Download Chart with 20,710 downloads sold.

== Charts ==
Chart (2016)	Peak position
South Korea (Gaon Digital Chart)	90
