= Marinette Yacht =

Marinette yachts were a line of aluminum-magnesium alloy yachts manufactured by Aluminum Cruisers Inc. from 1954 to 1991 in Louisville, Kentucky.

== History ==
In 1954 George Garcia, owner of Falls City Flying Service, introduced the ‘Marinette’ which was an aluminum houseboat initially built as a twin-hulled cruiser. Choosing to use an aluminum-magnesium alloy, whereas previous attempts at an aluminum watercraft had mainly involved small row boats made of a copper-aluminum alloy, the same metallic blend used on aircraft.

According to George Garcia, “copper and aluminum together are disastrous in the marine industry and they gave aluminum a terrible name we had to overcome.”

Marinettes were manufactured under the marine division of Falls City Flying Service, whose main business was fueling and servicing aircraft at Louisville's Bowman Field and later at Standiford Field. Eventually the marine division was incorporated into Aluminum Cruisers Inc. In addition to the trademark Marinette, the company also assembled 50 to 60 foot custom boats with a catamaran hull. Even though George Garcia sold the company in 1984, Aluminum Cruisers Inc. continued production of the Marinette until 1991 when the company was finally liquidated.

The manufacturing rights were later purchased by John Althouse with the intention of restarting production. No new boats are currently being manufactured.

The yachts varied in length from 26 to 44 feet, and included express, sport fisherman, sedan and dual cabin models on a semi-planing hull. The series was made of welded aluminum.

Most Marinettes today are used on inland rivers and lakes, although some are found in saltwater locations. They are, due to their light weight, relatively shallow chine angle, flat transom and broad beam, relatively fast and economical for boats of their size.
