= Marionette (show) =

Marionette is a 90-minutes non-verbal breakdancing performance, created and performed by a South Korean breakdancing group Expression. The name Marionette comes from the French word marionette, a type of puppet moved by using strings. Like the name suggest, the show Marionette features the performers imitating and dancing as a puppeteer and his puppets.

== International Success ==
Marionette was first performed in South Korea, early 2006, at Korean Lotte Theme Park. When it was first premiered, it brought international attention. Many countries invited Expression to perform Marionette, and Expression soon began a world Marionette tour. This international success also brought people's attention within Korea. The performance Marionette was freely available on Expression's website, and subsequently available on YouTube, uploaded by Lee Woo Sung also helped to spread the word around both within and outside South Korea.

== Remake as a Stage Show ==
Later 2006, Expression re-worked Marionette into a 90-minutes stage show with the same name and themes. The musical enjoyed the same success as the original Marionette. The new stage show was performed at Seoul from 2007.
