= List of 2018 American television debuts =

These American television shows premiered in 2018.

First aired	Title	Channel	Source
January 1	Love & Hip Hop: Miami	VH1	
January 1	Bahamas Life	HGTV	
January 2	LA to Vegas	Fox	
January 3	9-1-1	Fox	
January 3	Grown-ish	Freeform	
January 3	WAGS Atlanta	E!	
January 4	The Four: Battle for Stardom	Fox	
January 5	Child Support	ABC	
January 7	The Chi	Showtime	
January 10	Alone Together	Freeform	
January 12	Electric Dreams	Amazon Video	
January 12	My Next Guest Needs No Introduction with David Letterman	Netflix	
January 14	Hot Streets	Adult Swim	
January 15	The Adventures of Kid Danger	Nickelodeon	
January 15	José José, el príncipe de la canción	Telemundo	
January 16	Black Lightning	The CW	
January 17	Corporate	Comedy Central	
January 17	Relative Success with Tabatha	Bravo	
January 18	Flip or Flop Nashville	HGTV	
January 19	Trolls: The Beat Goes On!	Netflix	
January 20	Cavuto Live	Fox News	
January 21	The Resident	Fox	
January 22	The Alienist	TNT	
January 22	Mosaic	HBO	
January 23	We'll Meet Again with Ann Curry	PBS	
January 25	Tom vs Time	Facebook Watch	
January 26	Britannia	Amazon Prime Video	
January 31	Step Up: High Water	YouTube Premium	
January 31	Von Miller's Studio 58	Facebook Watch	
February 1	A.P. Bio	NBC	
February 2	Altered Carbon	Netflix	
February 2	Fly Guys	Facebook Watch	
February 6	Bethenny & Fredrik	Bravo	
February 7	Celebrity Big Brother	CBS	
February 11	Here and Now	HBO	
February 11	Our Cartoon President	Showtime	
February 13	The Bachelor Winter Games	ABC	
February 15	Behind the Wall: Bubba Wallace	Facebook Watch	
February 16	Everything Sucks!	Netflix	
February 17	Inside the Madness: Kentucky Basketball	Facebook Watch	
February 18	The Joel McHale Show with Joel McHale	Netflix	
February 18	Meet the Peetes	Hallmark Channel	
February 19	Pinkalicious & Peterrific	PBS Kids	
February 23	Apple & Onion	Cartoon Network	
February 23	Seven Seconds	Netflix	
February 24	Knight Squad	Nickelodeon	
February 26	Final Space	TBS	
February 26	Good Girls	NBC	
February 26	Living Biblically	CBS	
February 27	Unsolved	USA Network	
February 27	Winter Break: Hunter Mountain	MTV/MTV2	
March 4	The Alec Baldwin Show	ABC	
March 7	Life Sentence	The CW	
March 7	Youth & Consequences	YouTube Premium	
March 8	Champions	NBC	
March 8	The Oath	Sony Crackle	
March 9	Nailed It!	Netflix	
March 11	Deception	ABC	
March 13	For the People	ABC	
March 13	Rise	NBC	
March 15	The Tattoo Shop	Facebook Watch	
March 16	On My Block	Netflix	
March 18	Genius Junior	NBC	
March 18	Instinct	CBS	
March 21	Krypton	Syfy	
March 21	Bear Grylls: Face the Wild	Facebook Watch	
March 22	Station 19	ABC	
March 23	Alexa & Katie	Netflix	
March 25	Barry	HBO	
March 25	The Terror	AMC	
March 25	Trust	FX	
March 26	Keep It Spotless	Nickelodeon	
March 27	Splitting Up Together	ABC	
March 28	Alex, Inc.	ABC	
March 29	Siren	Freeform	
March 29	Marcia Clark Investigates the First 48	A&E	
March 30	Craig of the Creek	Cartoon Network	
March 30	The Dangerous Book for Boys	Amazon Video	
March 31	The Last O.G.	TBS	
March 31	Star Falls	Nickelodeon	
April 1	Your Husband Is Cheating on Us	Bravo	
April 2	Get Up!	ESPN	
April 2	The Crossing	ABC	
April 6	The Boss Baby: Back in Business	Netflix	
April 8	Killing Eve	BBC America	
April 9	My Perfect Family	NBC	
April 10	Fixer Upper: Behind the Design	HGTV	
April 10	In Contempt	BET	
April 11	Sell It Like Serhant	Bravo	
April 13	Wyatt Cenac's Problem Areas	HBO	
April 14	Littlest Pet Shop: A World of Our Own	Discovery Family	
April 15	Southern Charm New Orleans	Bravo	
April 19	Ex on the Beach	MTV	
April 20	Spy Kids: Mission Critical	Netflix	
April 27	SKAM Austin	Facebook Watch	
May 2	Cobra Kai	YouTube Premium	
May 3	Help Us Get Married	Facebook Watch	
May 4	A Little Help with Carol Burnett	Netflix	
May 6	Vida	Starz	
May 6	Sweetbitter	Starz	
May 7	Red Table Talk	Facebook Watch	
May 11	The Adventures of Rocky and Bullwinkle	Amazon Video	
May 11	All Night	Hulu	
May 11	The Who Was? Show	Netflix	
May 14	The Big Fun Crafty Show	Universal Kids	
May 22	The Great American Read	PBS	
May 23	The Split	Sundance TV	
May 27	The Fourth Estate	Showtime	
May 27	The Break with Michelle Wolf	Netflix	
May 28	Cults and Extreme Belief	A&E	
May 30	Reverie	NBC	
May 30	Dallas & Robo	YouTube Premium	
June 1	C.B. Strike	Cinemax	
June 2	FLCL Progressive	Adult Swim	
June 3	Pose	FX	
June 3	Succession	HBO	
June 4	High Noon	ESPN	
June 4	Dietland	AMC	
June 4	Five Points	Facebook Watch	
June 6	Impulse	YouTube Premium	
June 6	Condor	Audience	
June 7	American Woman	Paramount Network	
June 7	Cloak & Dagger	Freeform	
June 8	The Hollow	Netflix	
June 8	Treehouse Detectives	Netflix	
June 12	The Last Defense	ABC	
June 12	Huda Boss	Facebook Watch	
June 13	Gordon Ramsay's 24 Hours to Hell and Back	Fox	
June 14	Strange Angel	CBS All Access	
June 18	The Proposal	ABC	
June 18	Big City Greens	Disney Channel	
June 18	America Says	GSN	
June 19	Love Is	OWN	
June 20	Yellowstone	Paramount Network	
June 21	Take Two	ABC	
June 21	My Aloha Dream Home	HGTV	
June 24	Girl Meets Farm	Food Network	
June 25	Wedding Cake Championship	Food Network	
June 27	Liza on Demand	YouTube Premium	
June 29	Harvey Girls Forever!	Netflix	
July 1	Kandi Koated Nights	Bravo	
July 2	Mostly 4 Millennials	Adult Swim	
July 7	Summer Camp Island	Cartoon Network	
July 8	Very Cavallari	E!	
July 9	Deadly Rich	CNBC	
July 10	The Outpost	The CW	
July 11	Confetti	Facebook Watch	
July 11	Dr. Pimple Popper	TLC	
July 11	Bobcat Goldthwait's Misfits & Monsters	truTV	
July 11	TKO: Total Knock Out	CBS	
July 13	Whistleblower	CBS	
July 13	Fancy Nancy	Disney Jr.	
July 13	The Epic Tales of Captain Underpants	Netflix	
July 13	Sugar Rush	Netflix	
July 15	Who Is America?	Showtime	
July 16	Caroline & Friends	GSN	
July 16	Exatlón Estados Unidos	Telemundo	
July 16	Fox News Update	Facebook Watch	
July 16	Anderson Cooper Full Circle	Facebook Watch	
July 17	Mic Dispatch	Facebook Watch	
July 18	Undivided ATTN:	Facebook Watch	
July 18	Best Shot	YouTube Premium	
July 18	At What Cost?	Facebook Watch	
July 19	Quartz News	Facebook Watch	
July 20	Rise of the Teenage Mutant Ninja Turtles	Nickelodeon	
July 20	Prospects	SNY	
July 21	More in Common	Facebook Watch	
July 22	Profile	Facebook Watch	
July 24	Miz & Mrs.	USA Network	
July 25	Castle Rock	Hulu	
July 25	Sideswiped	YouTube Premium	
July 27	Sacred Lies	Facebook Watch	
July 27	Cupcake & Dino: General Services	Netflix	
July 28	Pink Collar Crimes	CBS	
July 30	Tropical Cop Tales	Adult Swim	
July 31	Making It	NBC	
July 31	Hard to Kill	Discovery Channel	
August 1	Turnt	Facebook Watch	
August 2	Bachelorette Weekend	CMT	
August 3	Random Acts of Flyness	HBO	
August 5	Mega Man: Fully Charged	Cartoon Network	
August 6	25 Words or Less	Fox O&O	
August 6	Lodge 49	AMC	
August 6	Inspiring Life with Lewis Howes	Facebook Watch	
August 6	On Location	Facebook Watch	
August 7	Castaways	ABC	
August 10	All About The Washingtons	Netflix	
August 10	Insatiable	Netflix	
August 12	Let’s Eat	Food Network	
August 13	Marvel Rising: Initiation	Disney XD	
August 13	After After Party	Facebook Watch	
August 17	Disenchantment	Netflix	
August 18	Esme & Roy	HBO Family	
August 20	Little Life on the Prairie	TLC	
August 22	An Imperfect Union	Facebook Watch	
August 23	Rob Riggle's Ski Master Academy	Sony Crackle	
August 26	Sneaky Hustle	Facebook Watch	
August 30	One Dollar	CBS All Access	
August 30	Pretty Little Mamas	MTV	
August 31	Jack Ryan	Amazon Video	
August 31	Paradise PD	Netflix	
September 1	Total DramaRama	Cartoon Network	
September 1	Transformers: Cyberverse	Cartoon Network	
September 4	Mayans M.C.	FX	
September 4	The Purge	USA Network	
September 4	Model Squad	E!	
September 4	Business Insider Today	Facebook Watch	
September 5	Troy the Magician	Facebook Watch	
September 6	Bite Club	Food Network	
September 6	Real America with Jorge Ramos	Facebook Watch	
September 8	Bake It Like Buddy	Discovery Family	
September 8	FLCL Alternative	Adult Swim	
September 9	You	Lifetime	
September 9	Rel	Fox	
September 9	Kidding	Showtime	
September 9	Ashlee+Evan	E!	
September 10	GMA Day	ABC	
September 10	Amanpour & Company	PBS	
September 10	Lock It In	FS1	
September 10	True Crime Files	First-run syndication	
September 14	The First	Hulu	
September 14	The Dragon Prince	Netflix	
September 14	Norm Macdonald Has a Show	Netflix	
September 14	Forever	Amazon Video	
September 14	I Am More: OBJ	Facebook Watch	
September 15	DC Daily	DC Universe	
September 16	Human Kind Of	Facebook Watch	
September 18	Chasing Corruption	Facebook Watch	
September 18	Sorry for Your Loss	Facebook Watch	
September 18	Sweet Home Sextuplets	TLC	
September 19	I Feel Bad	NBC	
September 21	The Good Cop	Netflix	
September 21	Hilda	Netflix	
September 21	Pete the Cat	Amazon Video	
September 22	You Kiddin' Me	Facebook Watch	
September 24	Bravo’s Play by Play	Bravo	
September 24	Manifest	NBC	
September 24	Magnum P.I.	CBS	
September 24	NowThis Morning	Facebook Watch	
September 25	New Amsterdam	NBC	
September 25	FBI	CBS	
September 26	Single Parents	ABC	
September 26	A Million Little Things	ABC	
September 27	Murphy Brown	CBS	
September 28	The Cool Kids	Fox	
September 30	God Friended Me	CBS	
October 1	Bluey	Disney Jr.	
October 1	Brake Room	Discovery Channel	
October 1	Us & Them	Sony Crackle	
October 1	Remy & Papoose: Meet the Mackies	VH1	
October 1	The Neighborhood	CBS	
October 1	Happy Together	CBS	
October 4	Star Trek: Short Treks	CBS All Access	
October 4	Consider It	Facebook Watch	
October 5	Into the Dark	Hulu	
October 5	Dancing Queen	Netflix	
October 6	Big Chicken Shaq	Facebook Watch	
October 7	Dancing with the Stars: Juniors	ABC	
October 7	Star Wars Resistance	Disney Channel/Disney XD	
October 10	All American	The CW	
October 12	The Romanoffs	Amazon Video	
October 12	Light as a Feather	Hulu	
October 12	Coop and Cami Ask the World	Disney Channel	
October 12	Titans	DC Universe	
October 13	American Ninja Warrior Junior	Universal Kids	
October 14	Camping	HBO	
October 16	The Conners	ABC	
October 16	The Kids Are Alright	ABC	
October 16	The Rookie	ABC	
October 17	NBA After the Buzzer	ESPN	
October 18	Liverspots and Astronots	Facebook Watch	
October 19	Get a Room with Carson & Thom	Bravo	
October 23	Married at First Sight: Honeymoon Island	Lifetime	
October 24	Double Take	Facebook Watch	
October 25	Legacies	The CW	
October 25	Heathers	Paramount Network	
October 26	Chilling Adventures of Sabrina	Netflix	
October 28	Patriot Act with Hasan Minhaj	Netflix	
October 28	Crikey! It's the Irwins	Animal Planet	
October 28	The LadyGang	E!	
October 28	Busy Tonight	E!	
October 29	Nightly Pop	E!	
October 30	Married at First Sight: Happily Ever After	Lifetime	
October 31	Tell Me a Story	CBS All Access	
November 2	Homecoming	Amazon Video	
November 4	Most Incredible Homes	Facebook Watch	
November 5	Rainbow Rangers	Nickelodeon/Nick Jr.	
November 12	Butterbean's Café	Nickelodeon/Nick Jr.	
November 12	CNN Right Now with Brianna Keilar	CNN	
November 14	Origin	YouTube Premium	
November 16	The Kominsky Method	Netflix	
November 16	Narcos: Mexico	Netflix	
November 16	Kung Fu Panda: The Paws of Destiny	Amazon Video	
November 18	My Brilliant Friend	HBO	
November 21	Let's Go Luna!	PBS Kids	
November 21	Queen America	Facebook Watch	
November 24	Cousins for Life	Nickelodeon	
November 25	Dirty John	Bravo	
November 29	Cut Through the Noise	Facebook Watch	
December 2	Nightflyers	Syfy	
December 9	The Shivering Truth	Adult Swim	
December 12	Champaign ILL	YouTube Premium	
December 19	Overthinking with Kat & June	YouTube Premium	
December 21	3Below: Tales of Arcadia	Netflix	
December 31	Winner Cake All	Food Network	

== See also ==
- 2018 in American television network changes
- 2018 deaths in American television
- 2018 in American television
