= List of Facebook Watch original programming =

Logo for Facebook Watch.

Facebook Watch was a service that provided streaming of videos hosted by Facebook and access to "Facebook Original" series, shows that receive funding from Facebook. The service officially launched as Facebook Watch on August 10, 2017.

For short-form videos, Facebook originally had a budget of roughly $10,000–$40,000 per episode, though renewal contracts have placed the budget in the range of $50,000–$70,000. Long-form TV-length series have budgets between $250,000 to over $1 million. The Wall Street Journal reported in September 2017 that the company was willing to spend up to $1 billion on original video content through 2018. In April 2023, Meta announced that they were discontinuing Facebook Watch, having already stopped developing scripted originals in 2020.

== Original programming ==
=== Drama ===
Title	Genre	Premiere	Seasons	Length	Status
SKAM Austin	Teen drama	April 27, 2018	2 seasons, 18 episodes	18–50 min.	Ended
Five Points	Teen drama	June 4, 2018	2 seasons, 20 episodes	10–17 min.	Ended
Sacred Lies	Anthology drama	July 27, 2018	2 seasons, 20 episodes	28–34 min.	Ended
Turnt	Teen drama	August 1, 2018	1 season, 40 episodes	7–18 min.	Ended
Sorry for Your Loss	Drama	September 18, 2018	2 seasons, 20 episodes	26–32 min.	Ended
The Birch	Horror drama	October 11, 2019	2 seasons, 17 episodes	11–19 min.	Ended
Limetown	Drama	October 16, 2019	1 season, 10 episodes	21–31 min.	Ended
Stereoscope	Horror drama	August 21, 2020	1 season, 10 episodes	11–19 min.	Ended
Mira Mira	Horror drama	January 15, 2021	1 season, 10 episodes	11–19 min.	Ended

=== Comedy ===
Title	Genre	Premiere	Seasons	Length	Status
Strangers	Comedy drama	September 4, 2017	2 seasons, 17 episodes	12–27 min.	Ended
Queen America	Dark comedy	November 18, 2018	1 season, 10 episodes	25–31 min.	Ended

=== Adult Animation ===
Title	Genre	Premiere	Seasons	Length	Status
Human Kind Of	Comedy	September 16, 2018	1 season, 21 episodes	4–10 min.	Ended
Liverspots and Astronots	Comedy	October 18, 2018	1 season, 21 episodes	4–10 min.	Ended
Human Discoveries	Comedy	July 16, 2019	1 season, 10 episodes	30 min.	Ended

=== Unscripted ===
==== Docuseries ====
Title	Genre	Premiere	Seasons	Length	Status
Humans of New York: The Series	Human interest	August 29, 2017	1 season, 13 episodes	13–24 min.	Ended
12 Hours With	Music	October 8, 2021	1 season, 4 episodes	12–14 min.	Ended
Bill Murray & Brian Doyle-Murray's Extra Innings	Sports/Comedy	November 20, 2017	1 season, 10 episodes	9–11 min.	Ended
Tom vs Time	Sports	January 25, 2018	1 season, 6 episodes	14–21 min.	Ended
Fly Guys	Sports	February 2, 2018	1 season, 10 episodes	12–15 min.	Ended
Behind the Wall: Bubba Wallace	Sports	February 15, 2018	1 season, 8 episodes	11–16 min.	Ended
Inside the Madness: Kentucky Basketball	Sports	February 17, 2018	1 season, 10 episodes	20–29 min.	Ended
I Am More: OBJ	Sports	September 14, 2018	1 season, 16 episodes	5–11 min.	Ended
Most Incredible Homes	Real estate	November 4, 2018	1 season, 5 episodes	12 min.	Ended
365 Days Of Love	Human interest	January 1, 2019	1 season, 365 episodes	1–3 min.	Ended
Mormon Love	Mormonism	January 13, 2019	1 season, 1 episode	15 min.	Ended
9 Months with Courteney Cox	Pregnancy	January 22, 2019	3 seasons, 60 episodes	10–20 min.	Ended
Curse of Akakor	Mystery	August 11, 2019	1 season, 12 episodes	30 min.	Ended
Simone vs Herself	Sports	June 15, 2021	1 season, 7 episodes	14–25 min.	Ended
JoJo Goes	Adventure	June 23, 2022	1 season, 8 episodes	14–18 min.	Ended

==== Game shows ====
Title	Genre	Premiere	Seasons	Length	Status
Confetti	Trivia game	July 11, 2018	1 season, 132 episodes	24–33 min.	Ended
What's in the Box?	Trivia game	September 26, 2018	1 season, 8 episodes	15 min.	Ended
School'd by Scary Mommy	Trivia game	February 14, 2019	1 season, 24 episodes	20–31 min.	Ended
Outside Your Bubble	Trivia game	February 20, 2019	1 season, 15 episodes	26–32 min.	Ended

==== Reality ====
Title	Genre	Premiere	Seasons	Length	Status
Ball in the Family	Sports	August 29, 2017	6 seasons, 116 episodes	14–26 min.	Ended
Returning the Favor	Reality	August 29, 2017	3 seasons, 36 episodes	18–26 min.	Ended
Make Up or Break Up	Reality	September 7, 2017	2 seasons, 26 episodes	18–41 min.	Ended
Win This House!	Reality	September 29, 2017	1 season, 8 episodes	32–57 min.	Ended
No Script with Marshawn Lynch	Sports/Comedy	October 12, 2017	1 season, 8 episodes	11–15 min.	Ended
RelationShipped	Reality competition	November 9, 2017	2 seasons, 38 episodes	13–29 min.	Ended
BackCourt: Wade	Sports	November 20, 2017	1 season, 5 episodes	6–11 min.	Ended
The Tattoo Shop	Reality	March 15, 2018	1 season, 8 episodes	13–16 min.	Ended
Bear Grylls: Face the Wild	Nature	March 21, 2018	1 season, 10 episodes	19–27 min.	Ended
Help Us Get Married	Reality	May 3, 2018	1 season, 12 episodes	21–30 min.	Ended
Huda Boss	Reality	June 12, 2018	2 seasons, 18 episodes	16–24 min.	Ended
Sneaker Hustle	Reality	August 26, 2018	1 season, 4 episodes	14–18 min.	Ended
Troy The Magician	Reality	September 5, 2018	1 season, 5 episodes	6–7 min.	Ended
You Kiddin' Me	Comedy	September 22, 2018	1 season, 10 episodes	13–15 min.	Ended
Big Chicken Shaq	Reality	October 6, 2018	1 season, 8 episodes	15–20 min.	Ended
Double Take	Comedy	October 24, 2018	1 season, 6 episodes	12–15 min.	Ended
Will Smith's Bucket List	Reality	February 27, 2019	1 season, 6 episodes	21–22 min.	Ended

==== Variety ====
Title	Genre	Premiere	Seasons	Length	Status
Von Miller's Studio 58	Sports/Pop culture	January 31, 2018	1 season, 8 episodes	21–23 min.	Ended
Red Table Talk	Talk show	May 7, 2018	5 seasons, 129 episodes	19–35 min.	Ended
Profile	Talk show	July 22, 2018	1 season, 62 episodes	16–40 min.	Ended
Inspiring Life with Lewis Howes	Talk show	August 6, 2018	1 season, 16 episodes	14–19 min.	Ended
After After Party	Late-night talk show	August 13, 2018	1 season, 30 episodes	11–15 min.	Ended
Steve on Watch	Talk show	January 6, 2020	1 season, 30 episodes	11–15 min.	Ended
Red Table Talk: The Estefans	Talk show	October 7, 2020	1 season, 20 episodes	24–33 min.	Ended

=== Continuations ===
Title	Genre	Prev. network(s)	Premiere	Seasons	Length	Status
I Want My Phone Back (seasons 2–3)	Game show	Comcast Watchable	August 29, 2017	2 seasons, 20 episodes	9–12 min.	Ended
Loosely Exactly Nicole (season 2)	Comedy	MTV	December 20, 2017	1 season, 10 episodes	17–20 min.	Ended
The Real Bros of Simi Valley (seasons 2–3)	Comedy	Independent (via YouTube)	November 30, 2018	2 seasons, 21 episodes	13–17 min.	Ended
The Real World (season 33) (plus 2 international editions)	Reality	MTV	June 13, 2019	1 season, 12 episodes	30 min.	Ended

=== News programming ===
Title	Genre	Premiere	Seasons	Length	Status
Fox News Update	News program	July 16, 2018	1 season, 311 episodes	3–13 min.	Ended
Anderson Cooper Full Circle	News program	July 16, 2018	1 season, 133 episodes	7–26 min.	Moved to CNN+
Mic Dispatch	News program	July 17, 2018	1 season, 55 episodes	5–19 min.	Ended
At What Cost?	News program	July 18, 2018	1 season, 26 episode	3–7 min.	Ended
Undivided ATTN:	News program	July 18, 2018	1 season, 25 episodes	2–5 min.	Ended
Quartz News	News program	July 19, 2018	1 season, 26 episodes	5–10 min.	Ended
More in Common	News program	July 21, 2018	1 season, 21 episodes	3–7 min.	Ended
On Location	News program	August 6, 2018	1 season, 160 episodes	5–7 min.	Ended
An Imperfect Union	News program	August 22, 2018	1 season, 21 episodes	5–10 min.	Ended
Business Insider Today	News program	September 4, 2018	1 season, 220 episodes	8–10 min.	Ended
Real America with Jorge Ramos	News program	September 6, 2018	1 season, 19 episodes	5–20 min.	Ended
Chasing Corruption	News program	September 18, 2018	1 season, 10 episodes	7–10 min.	Ended
NowThis Morning	News program	September 24, 2018	3 seasons, 124 episodes	3–27 min.	Ended
Consider It	News program	October 4, 2018	1 season, 13 episodes	12–23 min.	Ended
Cut Through The Noise	News program	November 29, 2018	1 season, 6 episodes	6–8 min.	Ended

=== Sports programming ===
Title	Genre	Premiere	Seasons	Length	Status
Live: Stadium College Football	College football	September 2, 2017	2 seasons, 25 episodes	174–226 min.	Ended
Live: Stadium College Basketball	College basketball	November 11, 2017	1 season, 66 episodes	91–153 min.	Ended
WWE Mixed Match Challenge	Professional wrestling	January 16, 2018	2 seasons, 26 episodes	22–35 min.	Ended
MLB Live	Baseball	April 4, 2018	1 season, 25 episodes	173–297 min.	Ended
JBA League	Basketball	June 21, 2018	1 season, 20 episodes	123–175 min.	Ended
BIG3 on FOX	Basketball	June 22, 2018	1 season, 9 episodes	42–46 min.	Ended
PGA Tour Live	Golfing	June 23, 2018	1 season, 8 episodes	259–279 min.	Ended
Nitro World Games	Action sports	August 10, 2018	1 season, 28 episodes	394 min.	Ended
Golden Boy Fight Night	Boxing	August 11, 2018	1 season, 5 episodes	154–191 min.	Ended
Friday Night Poker	Poker	September 21, 2018	1 season, 1 episode	272 min.	Ended
Lucha Capital	Professional wrestling	October 31, 2018	1 season, 5 episodes	112–125 min.	Ended

== Exclusive international distribution ==
These television shows, even though Facebook lists them as Facebook Watch originals, are shows that have been aired in different countries, and Facebook has bought exclusive distribution rights to stream them in other various countries. They may be available on Facebook Watch in their home territory and other markets where Facebook Watch does not have the first run license, without the Facebook Watch Original label, some time after their first-run airing on their original broadcaster.

English localized title (Original title)	Genre	Original Broadcaster	Original Region	Facebook Watch exclusive region	Seasons	Run	Language
Professional Fighters League (PFL)	Sports/Mixed martial arts	NBCSN	United States	All other markets	2	2018 – 2019	English
La Liga	Sports, Association football	Movistar LaLiga	Spain	Indian subcontinent	2	2018 – 2021	English
