= List of 2017 American television debuts =

These American television shows premiered in 2017.

First aired	Show	Channel	Source
January 1	The Mick	Fox	
January 1	Ransom	CBS	
January 2	Beyond	Freeform	
January 6	Emerald City	NBC	
January 6	Edgar Rice Burroughs' Tarzan and Jane	Netflix	
January 6	One Day at a Time	Netflix	
January 9	Big Fan	ABC	
January 9	For the Record with Greta	MSNBC	
January 10	We're Lalaloopsy	Netflix	
January 12	My Kitchen Rules	Fox	
January 12	Hanazuki: Full of Treasures	Discovery Family	
January 13	A Series of Unfortunate Events	Netflix	
January 15	Victoria	PBS	
January 15	The Young Pope	HBO	
January 15	Mickey Mouse Mixed-Up Adventures	Disney Channel/Disney Jr.	
January 15	First Family of Hip Hop	Bravo	
January 16	Summer House	Bravo	
January 16	Meet the Putnams	TLC	
January 16	Bunsen Is a Beast	Nickelodeon	
January 18	Six	History	
January 22	Hunted	CBS	
January 26	Riverdale	The CW	
February 1	The Quad	BET	
February 2	Powerless	NBC	
February 2	Training Day	CBS	
February 3	Santa Clarita Diet	Netflix	
February 5	24: Legacy	Fox	
February 6	APB	Fox	
February 6	Nella the Princess Knight	Nickelodeon/Nick Jr.	
February 7	Imposters	Bravo	
February 8	Legion	FX	
February 10	Abstract: The Art of Design	Netflix	
February 15	Doubt	CBS	
February 19	Big Little Lies	HBO	
February 19	Crashing	HBO	
February 19	The Good Fight	CBS All Access	
February 20	The Breaks	VH1	
February 23	The Blacklist: Redemption	NBC	
February 24	Legend Quest	Netflix	
February 24	Ultimate Beastmaster	Netflix	
February 24	VeggieTales in the City	Netflix	
February 27	Taken	NBC	
March 1	Chicago Justice	NBC	
March 1	The Deed	CNBC	
March 5	Making History	Fox	
March 5	Time After Time	ABC	
March 5	Feud	FX	
March 6	Cloudy with a Chance of Meatballs	Cartoon Network	
March 9	Kicking & Screaming	Fox	
March 10	Buddy Thunderstruck	Netflix	
March 13	Hunter Street	Nickelodeon	
March 14	Trial & Error	NBC	
March 17	Iron Fist	Netflix	
March 17	Julie's Greenroom	Netflix	
March 17	The Marvelous Mrs. Maisel	Amazon Video	
March 20	Sweet Home Oklahoma	Bravo	
March 20	The Twins: Happily Ever After?	Freeform	
March 22	Shots Fired	Fox	
March 24	Tangled: The Series	Disney Channel	
March 28	Rebel	BET	
March 29	Imaginary Mary	ABC	
March 31	13 Reasons Why	Netflix	
March 31	Five Came Back	Netflix	
April 5	Brockmire	IFC	
April 7	Andi Mack	Disney Channel	
April 7	First Dates	NBC	
April 7	The Toy Box	ABC	
April 7	You the Jury	Fox	
April 8	The Son	AMC	
April 8	Nate & Jeremiah by Design	TLC	
April 9	Talking with Chris Hardwick	AMC	
April 14	Puppy Dog Pals	Disney Channel/Disney Jr.	
April 18	Famous in Love	Freeform	
April 21	Bill Nye Saves the World	Netflix	
April 21	Girlboss	Netflix	
April 21	Hot Girls Wanted: Turned On	Netflix	
April 25	Great News	NBC	
April 25	Genius	National Geographic Channel	
April 26	The Handmaid's Tale	Hulu	
April 27	The President Show	Comedy Central	
April 28	Dear White People	Netflix	
April 30	American Gods	Starz	
May 1	Daily Pop	E!	
May 1	The Fox News Specialists	Fox News	
May 2	Truth & Iliza	Freeform	
May 4	Second Wives Club	E!	
May 5	Spirit Riding Free	Netflix	
May 8	Southern Charm Savannah	Bravo	
May 12	All Hail King Julien: Exiled	Netflix	
May 14	Invite Only Cabo	Bravo	
May 17	Downward Dog	ABC	
May 19	The Keepers	Netflix	
May 21	Boise Boys	HGTV	
May 25	Beat Shazam	Fox	
May 25	Cyrus vs. Cyrus: Design and Conquer	Bravo	
May 27	The Ollie & Moon Show	Sprout	
May 29	Still Star-Crossed	ABC	
May 30	World of Dance	NBC	
May 31	The F Word	Fox	
June 3	Billy Dilley's Super-Duper Subterranean Summer	Disney XD	
June 4	I'm Dying Up Here	Showtime	
June 4	The Next Revolution	Fox News	
June 4	Sunday Night with Megyn Kelly	NBC	
June 5	Daytime Divas	VH1	
June 6	The Jim Jefferies Show	Comedy Central	
June 6	Planet of the Apps	Apple Music	
June 11	Steve Harvey's Funderdome	ABC	
June 11	Claws	TNT	
June 12	Superhuman	Fox	
June 14	Blood Drive	Syfy	
June 14	Emogenius	GSN	
June 20	The Bold Type	Freeform	
June 21	Little Big Shots: Forever Young	NBC	
June 22	The Mist	Spike	
June 22	Boy Band	ABC	
June 22	Free Rein	Netflix	
June 23	GLOW	Netflix	
June 25	Hotel Transylvania: The Series	Disney Channel	
June 27	Tales	BET	
June 28	Hood Adjacent with James Davis	Comedy Central	
June 29	Morning Dose	First-run syndication	
June 30	Gypsy	Netflix	
July 5	Snowfall	FX	
July 6	Real Estate Wars	Bravo	
July 7	Castlevania	Netflix	
July 9	Apollo Gauntlet	Adult Swim	
July 9	Candy Crush	CBS	
July 9	The Spouse House	TLC	
July 10	Will	TNT	
July 12	I'm Sorry	truTV	
July 12	Salvation	CBS	
July 14	Friends from College	Netflix	
July 15	Parker Plays	Disney XD	
July 15	Polaris Primetime	Disney XD	
July 20	Flip or Flop Atlanta	HGTV	
July 21	Ozark	Netflix	
July 21	Raven's Home	Disney Channel	
July 24	Midnight, Texas	NBC	
July 24	Somewhere Between	ABC	
July 24	Welcome to the Wayne	Nickelodeon	
July 28	The Last Tycoon	Amazon Video	
July 28	Room 104	HBO	
July 28	Daughters of Destiny	Netflix	
July 31	The Beat With Ari Melber	MSNBC	
July 31	CBSN: On Assignment	CBS/CBSN	
July 31	Siesta Key	MTV	
August 1	OK K.O.! Let's Be Heroes	Cartoon Network	
August 1	Manhunt	Discovery Channel	
August 2	The Sinner	USA Network	
August 3	The Guest Book	TBS	
August 3	What Would Diplo Do?	Viceland	
August 8	Carpool Karaoke: The Series	Apple Music	
August 9	Mr. Mercedes	Audience	
August 11	Atypical	Netflix	
August 11	True and the Rainbow Kingdom	Netflix	
August 12	DuckTales (2017 TV series)	Disney XD	
August 13	Get Shorty	Epix	
August 16	Marlon	NBC	-
August 19	Spider-Man	Disney XD	
August 22	The Planets (later The Planets and Beyond)	Science Channel	
August 25	Disjointed	Netflix	
August 28	Cuomo Prime Time	CNN	
August 28	Mysticons	Nickelodeon	
August 29	Humans of New York: The Series	Facebook Watch	
August 29	Ball in the Family	Facebook Watch	
August 29	Returning the Favor	Facebook Watch	
September 1	Lego Elves: Secret of Elvendale	Netflix	
September 4	I Am Frankie	Nickelodeon	
September 4	Funny You Should Ask	First-run syndication	
September 4	Strangers	Facebook Watch	
September 5	Steve	First-run syndication	
September 7	Make Up or Break Up	Facebook Watch	
September 8	Fire Chasers	Netflix	
September 8	Greenhouse Academy	Netflix	
September 8	The Confession Tapes	Netflix	
September 10	The Orville	Fox	
September 15	American Vandal	Netflix	
September 17	Philip K. Dick's Electric Dreams	Amazon Video	
September 18	Couples Court with the Cutlers	First-run syndication	
September 18	DailyMailTV	First-run syndication	
September 18	Pickler & Ben	First-run syndication	
September 22	Mike Judge Presents: Tales from the Tour Bus	Cinemax	
September 22	Jack Whitehall: Travels with My Father	Netflix	
September 22	Neo Yokio	Netflix	
September 24	Star Trek: Discovery	CBS All Access	
September 24	After Trek	CBS All Access	
September 25	The Good Doctor	ABC	
September 25	The Opposition with Jordan Klepper	Comedy Central	
September 25	Me, Myself & I	CBS	
September 25	Young Sheldon	CBS	
September 25	The Brave	NBC	
September 25	Megyn Kelly Today	NBC	
September 26	Law & Order True Crime	NBC	
September 27	SEAL Team	CBS	
September 27	Best Baker in America	Food Network	
September 29	Win This House!	Facebook Watch	
September 29	The Magic School Bus Rides Again	Netflix	
September 29	Big Mouth	Netflix	
September 29	Marvel's Inhumans	ABC	
October 1	Ten Days in the Valley	ABC	
October 1	Ghosted	Fox	
October 1	Vampirina	Disney Channel/Disney Jr.	
October 1	Wisdom of the Crowd	CBS	
October 2	9JKL	CBS	
October 2	The Gifted	Fox	
October 3	Kevin (Probably) Saves the World	ABC	
October 3	The Mayor	ABC	
October 5	Ghost Wars	Syfy	
October 9	Valor	The CW	
October 11	Dynasty	The CW	
October 12	The Comedy Get Down	BET	
October 12	I Love You, America with Sarah Silverman	Hulu	
October 12	No Script with Marshawn Lynch	Facebook Watch	
October 13	Top Chef Junior	Universal Kids	
October 13	Mindhunter	Netflix	
October 14	Super Monsters	Netflix	
October 15	Lip Sync Battle Shorties	Nickelodeon	
October 17	Hit the Road	Audience	
October 17	Loudermilk	Audience	
October 20	Superstition	Syfy	
October 22	The Jellies	Adult Swim	
October 23	The Noise	Universal Kids	
October 27	Unikitty!	Cartoon Network	
October 30	The Ingraham Angle	Fox News	
November 2	S.W.A.T.	CBS	
November 5	Xscape: Still Kicking It	Bravo	
November 6	Top Wing	Nick Jr.	
November 7	Damnation	USA Network	
November 9	RelationShipped	Facebook Watch	
November 10	Dinotrux Supercharged	Netflix	
November 12	Unexpected	TLC	
November 12	No Activity	CBS All Access	
November 14	Future Man	Hulu	
November 17	The Punisher	Netflix	
November 17	Stretch Armstrong and the Flex Fighters	Netflix	
November 17	Shot in the Dark	Netflix	
November 20	Big Hero 6: The Series	Disney XD	
November 20	Bill Murray & Brian Doyle-Murray's Extra Innings	Facebook Watch	
November 20	BackCourt: Wade	Facebook Watch	
November 21	Marvel's Runaways	Hulu	
November 21	Checked Inn	OWN	
November 23	She's Gotta Have It	Netflix	
November 24	Trailer Park Boys Out of the Park: USA	Netflix	
November 27	Floribama Shore	MTV	
December 4	Tarantula	TBS	
December 4	RelationShep	Bravo	
December 5	Stripped	Bravo	
December 6	Happy!	Syfy	
December 10	Counterpart	Starz	
December 11	Amanpour on PBS	PBS	
December 18	Ellen's Game of Games	NBC	
December 22	72 Dangerous Animals: Latin America	Netflix	
December 22	Dope	Netflix	
December 22	The Toys That Made Us	Netflix	
