= 2017 in television =

2017 in television may refer to

- 2017 in American television for television-related events in the United States.
  - List of 2017 American television debuts for television debut related events in the United States.
- 2017 in Australian television for television-related events in Australia.
- 2017 in British television for television-related events in the United Kingdom.
  - 2017 in Scottish television for television-related events in Scotland.
- 2017 in Canadian television for television-related events in Canada.
- 2017 in Danish television for television-related events in Denmark.
- 2017 in Estonian television for television-related events in Estonia.
- 2017 in German television for television-related events in Germany.
- 2017 in Indian television for television-related events in India.
- 2017 in Irish television for television-related events in the Republic of Ireland.
- 2017 in Italian television for television-related events in Italy.
- 2017 in Japanese television for television-related events in Japan.
- 2017 in Mexican television for television-related events in Mexico.
- 2017 in Pakistani television for television-related events in Pakistan.
- 2017 in Philippine television for television-related events in the Philippines.
- 2017 in Portuguese television for television-related events in Portugal.
- 2017 in South African television for television-related events in South Africa.
- 2017 in South Korean television for television-related events in South Korea.
