= Curse of Akakor =

- Genre: Reality
- Starring: Paul Connolly; Bobby Chacon; Brennon Edwards; Megan Hine; Karina Oliani; Martin Pepper
- Country of origin: United States
- Original language: English
- No. of seasons: 1
- No. of episodes: 12

Production
- Executive producers: John Luscombe; Nick Long
- Production company: Beyond Productions

Original release
- Network: Facebook Watch
- Release: August 11 – October 27, 2019

Curse of Akakor is an American reality show docuseries that premiered on August 11, 2019, on Facebook Watch. It follows six investigators in the Amazon rainforest searching for the lost city of Akakor, and detailing past experiences of explorers who unsuccessfully made the same search. Viewers will be able to give their own theories after watching episodes on the program's Facebook page.

The program was announced in June 2019. It is produced by Australian-based production company Beyond International. The last episode was posted on October 27, 2019.

== Cast ==
- Paul Connolly - investigative journalist
- Bobby Chacon - former FBI agent
- Brennon Edwards - technology expert
- Megan Hine - survival expert
- Dr. Karina Oliani - wilderness doctor
- Dr. Martin Pepper - geologist and explorer

== See also ==
- List of original programs distributed by Facebook Watch
