= 2018 in television =

2018 in television may refer to

- 2018 in American television for television-related events in the United States.
  - List of 2018 American television debuts for television debut related events in the United States.
- 2018 in Australian television for television-related events in Australia.
- 2018 in British television for television-related events in the United Kingdom.
  - 2018 in Scottish television for television-related events in Scotland.
- 2018 in Canadian television for television-related events in Canada.
- 2018 in Estonian television for television-related events in Estonia.
- 2018 in Indian television for television-related events in India.
  - 2018 in Tamil television for television-related events in Tamil.
- 2018 in Irish television for television-related events in the Republic of Ireland.
- 2018 in Japanese television for television-related events in Japan.
- 2018 in Mexican television for television-related events in Mexico.
- 2018 in Philippine television for television-related events in the Philippines.
- 2018 in South African television for television-related events in South Africa.
- 2018 in South Korean television for television-related events in South Korea.
