= Big Chicken (disambiguation) =

Big Chicken is a KFC restaurant in Marietta, Georgia.

Big Chicken may also refer to:

- Big Chicken (restaurant chain), an American fast food restaurant chain
  - Big Chicken Shaq, an American reality TV show about the chain
- Big chicken dinner, a nickname for the Bad Conduct Discharge from the U.S. Armed Forces
- Big Chicken Hollow, a valley in San Mateo County, California
- Big Chicken Island, an island in Ontario located in Lake Erie
- Large-scale poultry farming operations
