= Big Chicken (restaurant chain) =

Restaurant in United States

- Industry: Restaurants
- Genre: Fast food restaurant
- Founded: October 23, 2018; 7 years ago in Las Vegas, Nevada
- Founders: Shaquille O'Neal; JRS Hospitality; Authentic Brands Group
- Number of locations: 18 (2023)
- Key people: Shaquille O'Neal
- Website: www.bigchicken.com

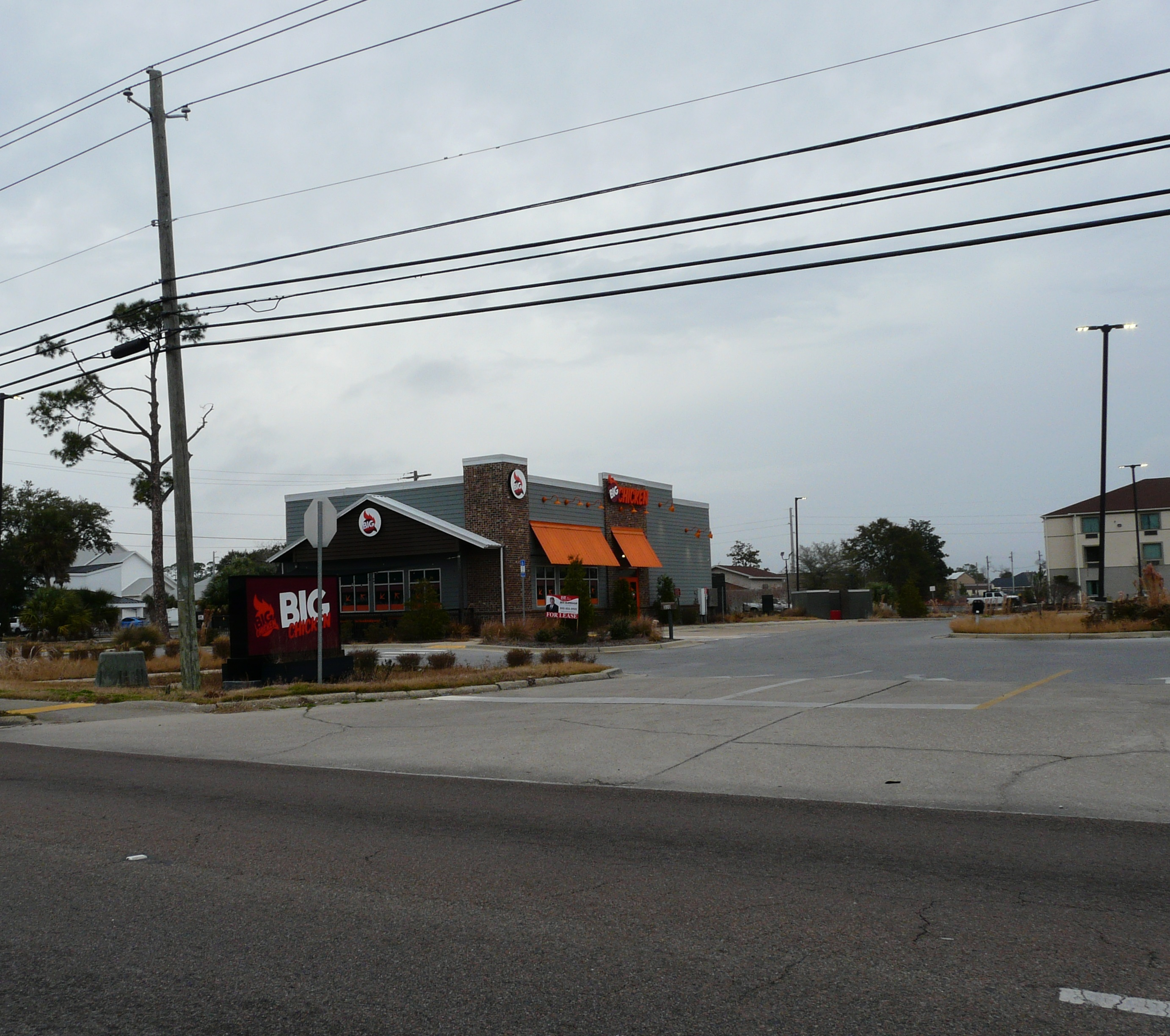
Closed Big Chicken in Panama City (2025)

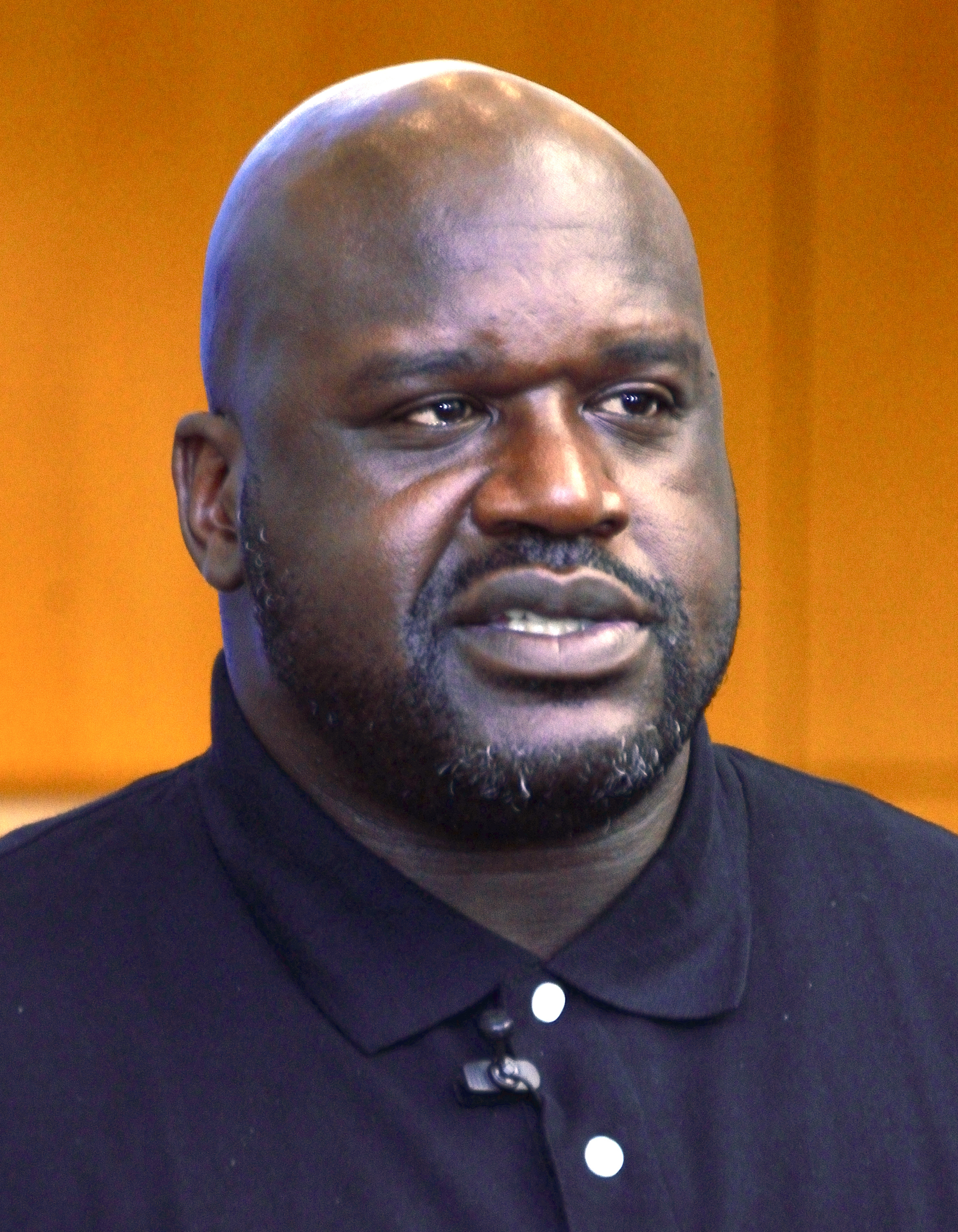
Business partner Shaquille O'Neal in 2017

Big Chicken is a fast casual restaurant chain in the United States. It was founded by retired Hall of Fame National Basketball Association star Shaquille O'Neal, along with JRS Hospitality and Authentic Brands Group. The chain serves Louisiana-style fried chicken sandwiches, Cheez-It macaroni, and cookies "as big as basketballs." A few locations offer craft beers, wine, and hard liquor.

The menu reflects O'Neal's public personality, with each offering named after a person or quality in his life. One is named for his colleague and sometime rival Charles Barkley, while the Uncle Jerome is named for his bodyguard. Others are named for O'Neal's nicknames, like the Superman and the Shaq Daddy.

== Background ==
O'Neal became one of the NBA's most marketable stars in the 1990s, and after his retirement in 2011, he made considerably more in endorsements than he did during his playing career. As part of his marketing reach, O'Neal paid more than $100 million to own or co-own more than 150 restaurants in the Five Guys Burgers, Auntie Anne's, Papa John's, and Krispy Kreme chains.

== Openings ==
In October 2018, O'Neal opened his first Big Chicken restaurant in Las Vegas, Nevada. To promote the launch, O'Neal starred in Big Chicken Shaq, a reality TV series that premiered on October 6, 2018, on Facebook Watch.

Expansions of the chain soon followed, especially after it announced its franchise program in August 2021. Locations the chain expanded to include Tempe and Gilbert, Arizona; Glendale and Valencia, California; Baltimore, Maryland; Kansas City, Missouri; Bridgewater, New Jersey; Elmont, New York; Miamisburg, Ohio; Philadelphia, Pennsylvania; Austin and Houston, Texas; Seattle and Renton, Washington; Wrentham and Peabody, Massachusetts; and Chattanooga, Tennessee. Several Big Chicken restaurants opened inside sports arenas, military bases, and Carnival cruise ships.

== International ==
Big Chicken open its first franchise outside of the United States within the Co-op Live Arena in Manchester, United Kingdom.

In March 2026, Big Chicken opened its first three restaurants in Honduras, located in San Pedro Sula, La Ceiba and Choluteca.

== See also ==
- List of casual dining restaurant chains
- List of chicken restaurants
