= Audie Cornish =

American journalist

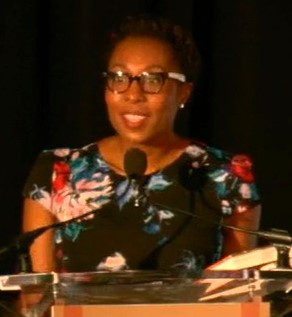
- Cornish at the 2016 National Book Festival
- Born: October 9, 1979 (age 47); Randolph, Massachusetts, U.S.
- Education: University of Massachusetts
- Occupation: Journalist
- Known for: All Things Considered; Profile; Pop Culture Happy Hour
- Spouse: Theo Emery
- Children: 2

Audie N. Cornish (born October 9, 1979) is an American journalist who hosts CNN This Morning with Audie Cornish and the weekly CNN Audio podcast, The Assignment with Audie Cornish. Prior to joining CNN, she co-hosted NPR's All Things Considered from 2012 to 2022. She was previously the host of Profile by BuzzFeed News, a web-only interview show that lasted one season, as well as NPR Presents, a long-form conversation series with creatives about their projects, processes, and shaping culture in America.

== Early life and education ==
Cornish was born in Randolph, Massachusetts, to Jamaican parents.

She graduated from Randolph High School. She subsequently graduated from the University of Massachusetts-Amherst with a journalism degree. During her years there, she interned with NPR and worked with campus radio station WMUA.

== Career ==
Previous jobs include reporting for the NPR station WBUR, for the Associated Press in Boston, and for NPR on 10 southern states and Capitol Hill issues. She shared the 2005 first prize in the National Awards for Education Writing for a study of the achievement gap between races. She is a member of the National Association of Black Journalists.

=== Weekend Edition and All Things Considered ===
External audio
- Wikipedia Archiving Voices So You'll Always Know How Celebs Sound, Audie Cornish, National Public Radio (8:24)

On September 4, 2011, Cornish replaced Liane Hansen on NPR's Weekend Edition Sunday. Hansen had served as host of the show for more than 20 years.

At the end of the December 18, 2011, broadcast of Weekend Edition, Cornish announced that she would be leaving the program in January 2012 to co-host All Things Considered during the 2012 election year, to be replaced on January 8 by Rachel Martin. It was subsequently reported that the change was due to Michele Norris's decision to step down from All Things Considered during the 2012 election year because her husband had taken a position in the Obama re-election campaign. On January 3, 2013, NPR announced that Cornish would remain the host of the show and that Norris would instead return as a special correspondent.

In August 2017, Cornish announced that she would take leave from NPR during her maternity leave. During her leave, she published occasional interviews in The New York Times Magazine. All Things Considered has an audience of 14 million listeners per week.

On January 4, 2022, Cornish announced her resignation from NPR to join The Great Resignation and "try something new." Co-host Ari Shapiro noted that NPR is "hemorrhaging hosts from marginalized backgrounds." Cornish's exit followed the departure of NPR hosts Noel King and Lulu Garcia-Navarro.

=== Other projects ===
From 2018 to 2019, Cornish hosted Profile, a BuzzFeed News interview TV show released exclusively on Facebook. This show was funded by Facebook as part of the social platform's push into investing in video news programming through its Facebook Watch platform. Each episode of Profile featured "a different newsmaker each week, giving viewers a chance to hear from the biggest names in politics, tech, business, and entertainment."

Following her resignation from NPR in early 2022, Cornish tweeted, "I look forward to new opportunities and new ways to tell stories and to keep finding ways to make space and center the voices of those who have been traditionally left out." On January 10, 2022, it was announced that Cornish joined CNN+ to host a weekly show.

On November 17, 2022, Cornish's weekly podcast The Assignment with Audie Cornish released its premiere episode. The Assignment, "pulls listeners out of their digital echo chambers to hear from the people who live the headlines," and received the "Best Interview Podcast" award at the 2023 Ambies.

On January 23, 2025, it was announced that Cornish would become host of CNN's early-morning newscast CNN This Morning in March 2025, succeeding Kasie Hunt.

== Personal life ==
Audie Cornish is married to author and journalist Theo Emery. She has two children and often speaks about the challenges of balancing work and family life.
