= BackCourt: Wade =

- Genre: Reality
- Directed by: Bob Metelus
- Starring: Dwyane Wade
- Country of origin: United States
- Original language: English
- No. of seasons: 1
- No. of episodes: 5

Production
- Executive producers: Dwyane Wade; Lisa Joseph Metelus
- Producer: Arlesha Amazan
- Running time: 6–11 minutes
- Production company: Bob Metelus Studio

Original release
- Network: Facebook Watch
- Release: November 20 – December 18, 2017

BackCourt: Wade is an American reality series that premiered on November 20, 2017 on Facebook Watch. It follows NBA basketball player Dwyane Wade and how he spends his time off-the-court.

== Premise ==
BackCourt: Wade follows "the three-time NBA champ as he travels to Paris and Milan for Men’s Fashion Week and takes up new hobbies (like golf and taking care of his new dog, Tre). Other episodes cover his mindset going into his 15th season in the NBA and provide an inside look at his business ventures, including his Way of Wade brand and Wade Wine labels."

== Production ==
=== Development ===
On November 17, 2017, it was announced that Facebook Watch had ordered a first season of BackCourt: Wade, a new reality series starring basketball player Dwyane Wade. Executive producers include Wade, Dwyane Wade and Lisa Joseph Metelus and producers include Arlesha Amazan, Bob Metelus, and Edward Burke. Production companies involved with the series include Bob Metelus Studio.

The series premiered on November 20, 2017.

=== Marketing ===
Simultaneously with the initial series announcement, Facebook released a trailer for the first season of the show.

== Episodes ==
No.	Title	Original release date
1	"Back Nine"	November 20, 2017
2	"Change Clothes"	November 27, 2017
3	"Mind Your Business"	December 4, 2017
4	"The Way of Wade"	December 11, 2017
5	"In the Moment"	December 18, 2017

== See also ==
- List of original programs distributed by Facebook Watch
