= James Sexton (attorney) =

American lawyer (born 1972)

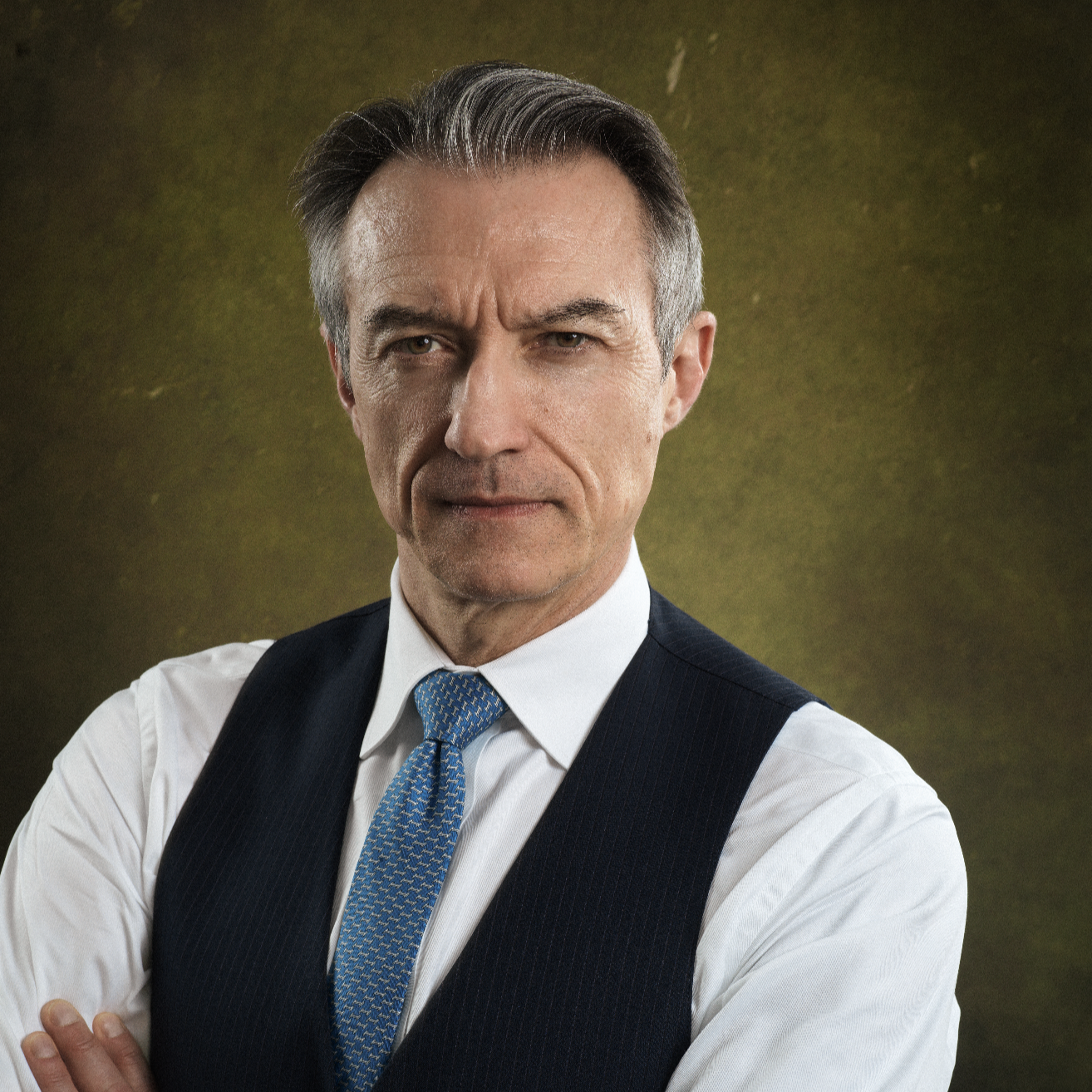
- Born: James Joseph Sexton; 1972 (age 53–54); New Bedford, Massachusetts, U.S.
- Education: Ramapo College of NJ, BSc (1994); New York University, MA (1997); Fordham University School of Law, JD (2001)
- Occupations: Attorney; author; commentator
- Children: 2
- Website: nycdivorces.com

James Joseph Sexton (born 1972) is an American attorney who practices in divorce and family law in the New York metropolitan area.

Sexton is a frequent media commentator on divorce-related issues and the author of two books on preventing divorce and maintaining a happy marriage.

== Career ==
Sexton was born in New Bedford, Massachusetts. In 2001, less than one year after his admission to the New York State Bar, Sexton opened Law Offices of James J. Sexton, PC where he has remained Managing Partner for over two decades.

He published his first book on marriage and divorce in 2018, originally titled If You're in My Office, It's Already Too Late in the United States. An updated edition was published in the United Kingdom as How Not to F*** Up Your Marriage: Straight Talk from a Divorce Lawyer Who's Seen It All.

Sexton has appeared on podcasts such as Lex Fridman, Soft White Underbelly, Modern Wisdom, The Diary of a CEO, and The Huberman Lab. He is the host of the podcast Better Call Sexton. He had a recurring segment "How to Stay in Love" on the Steve Harvey Show from 2019 to 2021. In 2025, he launched TrustedPrenup.com with the aim of making prenuptial agreements accessible to a wider public, after years of working on contracts for wealthy clients.

As of 2025, Sexton has practiced as a divorce lawyer in New York for 25 years. He is known for representing wealthy clients, including tech executives, celebrities, and athletes. He has represented clients in more than 1,000 cases involving marital disputes.

== Personal life ==
Sexton is divorced with two adult sons, as of 2025. He trains in Brazilian jiu-jitsu.

== Bibliography ==
- If You're in My Office, It's Already Too Late - A Divorce Lawyer's Guide to Staying Together (Henry Holt and Co., 2018)
- How to Stay in Love: Practical Wisdom from an Unexpected Source (Henry Holt and Co., 2019)
