= No Script with Marshawn Lynch =

- Genre: Reality; Comedy
- Starring: Marshawn Lynch
- Country of origin: United States
- Original language: English
- No. of seasons: 1
- No. of episodes: 8

Production
- Executive producers: Neil Punsalan; Marshawn Lynch
- Producers: Kristopher Sandifer; Diaunte Thompson
- Running time: 11–15 minutes
- Production companies: Beast Mode Productions; Bleacher Report

Original release
- Network: Facebook Watch
- Release: October 12 – November 30, 2017

No Script with Marshawn Lynch is an American comedy reality show series that premiered on October 12, 2017 on Facebook Watch. It follows football player Marshawn Lynch as he finds himself in various comedic situations and is joined by an array of guest stars.

== Premise ==
No Script with Marshawn Lynch is an unscripted series that "captures Marshawn in random situations, like whipping figure eights in race cars with Lil Rel Howery from Get Out, to whipping a military tank... for real." Three of the episodes included UNLV physics professor Michael Pravica (a.k.a. "Scientist!") who discussed the underlying physics with Marshawn when (e.g.) drifting cars in Episode 1, indoor skydiving in Episode 4 and demonstrating liquid nitrogen (including explosions) in Episode 8.

== Production ==
=== Development ===
On September 12, 2017, it was announced that Facebook Watch had given the production a series order for a first season consisting of eight episodes. It was reported that the series was being produced by Bleacher Report and that Facebook was spending "millions of dollars" for the reality show. In the deal that Facebook reached with the company, Facebook will retain exclusive rights to the show for an undisclosed period-of-time and once that exclusivity window closes, Bleacher Report will own the content and can use it.

=== Marketing ===
On October 9, 2017, Facebook released the official trailer for the series.

== Episodes ==
| No. | Title | Original release date |
|---|---|---|
| 1 | "Marshawn F's Up A Race Car" | October 12, 2017 |
| 2 | "Marshawn Remakes Star Wars" | October 19, 2017 |
| 3 | "Marshawn Punks a Sandwich Shop" | October 26, 2017 |
| 4 | "Marshawn Discovers Viral Videos" | November 2, 2017 |
| 5 | "Marshawn Puts the Crew Through a Beast Mode Workout" | November 9, 2017 |
| 6 | "Marshawn Doesn’t Mess with Roller Coasters" | November 16, 2017 |
| 7 | "Marshawn Crashes a Go-Kart" | November 23, 2017 |
| 8 | "Marshawn Blows Stuff Up with Science" | November 30, 2017 |

== See also ==
- List of original programs distributed by Facebook Watch
- https://www.highereddive.com/news/marshawn-lynchs-scientist-talks-future-of-research-and-importance-of-str/514031/
