= Steve (talk show) =

American syndicated talk show (2017–2019)

- Genre: Talk show
- Presented by: Steve Harvey
- Narrated by: Gary Owen (2017); Steve Kamer (2018–19)
- Country of origin: United States
- Original language: English
- No. of seasons: 4
- No. of episodes: 310 (plus two seasons of webisodes)

Production
- Executive producers: Steve Harvey; Shane Farley; Gerald Washington; Mark Shapiro; Mike Antinoro
- Running time: 42 minutes
- Production companies: SH Productions; IMG Original Content; (2017–2019); (seasons 1–2); Endeavor Content; (2019); (season 2)

Original release
- Network: Syndication (Seasons 1–2); Facebook Watch (2020–2021)
- Release: September 5, 2017 – June 26, 2019

Related
- Steve Harvey; Steve on Watch

Steve is a syndicated talk show that was hosted by entertainer Steve Harvey. It premiered on September 5, 2017, as a successor to Harvey's Chicago-based Steve Harvey talk show produced by Endemol. The series was produced from Universal Studios in California in partnership with Endeavor Content and NBCUniversal Television Distribution, and was described as having a larger focus on celebrity guests and Harvey's comedy (as opposed to the previous series, which focused more on human interest topics).

In 2018, the show was dropped by NBCUniversal and its stations for the 2019–2020 television season, in favor of The Kelly Clarkson Show. As a result, Steve was cancelled, and aired its final episode on June 26, 2019. In December 2019, Endeavor Content reached an agreement with Facebook Watch to revive Steve as an original series on the platform. Steve on Watch premiered on January 6, 2020.

== History ==
Harvey's previous talk show, Steve Harvey, was produced by Endemol Shine North America in Chicago, and ran for five seasons. In November 2016, it was announced that the program would be cancelled after the 2016–17 season. Concurrently, it was announced that Harvey had entered into a partnership with IMG and his previous distributor, NBCUniversal Television Distribution, to produce a new talk show in Los Angeles with an ownership stake, more creative control, and a celebrity-oriented format. The new series, Steve, originated from a new set at Stage 1 at Universal Studios in Universal City, California.

=== Production ===
Steve tapped Shane Farley as the executive producer, alongside Gerald Washington, IMG co-president Mark Shapiro, and Mike Antinoro. To accommodate Harvey, production of his radio show The Steve Harvey Morning Show, and the syndicated game show Family Feud, were both re-located from Atlanta to Los Angeles (the primetime Celebrity Family Feud had already been filmed in Los Angeles). The show premiered on September 5, 2017, with guests Chelsea Handler, Marlon Wayans, and James Arthur.

Steve was picked up in 90% of the United States, including most of the NBC Owned Television Stations group (where it inherited the previous program's timeslots as a lead-in to The Ellen DeGeneres Show). In January 2018, the show was renewed for a second and final season that premiered on September 4.

=== Cancellation ===
On September 19, 2018, it was announced that NBC Owned Television Stations had picked up The Kelly Clarkson Show—which is produced and distributed by NBCUniversal, to replace Steve on its stations for the 2019–2020 television season. Insiders reported that IMG had been shopping the series to a new distributor or outlet.

In January 2019, Harvey stated that he was caught off-guard by the news, arguing that he "thought it would have been nice of [NBC]" to inform that he was being replaced by Kelly Clarkson. Harvey noted that, across both shows, he had hosted daytime talk shows for seven consecutive seasons, despite volatility in daytime television due to other options such as streaming. In May 2019, Steve was officially cancelled, and its final episode aired on June 26.

== Format ==
Harvey described the new show's format as being more akin to a late-night talk show and one of his competitors, The Ellen DeGeneres Show, with a monologue, audience games, and celebrity guests. Harvey lamented that it was harder to secure celebrity guests for his previous show in Chicago, explaining that "I designed that show around a great city and those great people. We flew people in, but we didn't have to. In five years, I never had a regular person cancel. I don't expect that to be the case out here. Famous people cancel." Harvey stated that the new show would still feature human interest segments, but that he would be able to "interject a little bit more of my personality in terms of humor in a lot more areas".

== Steve on Watch ==
It was later announced in December 2019 that Harvey and Endeavor Content had signed a deal with Facebook Watch to produce a continuation of the show as a web series, Steve on Watch, with an initial 10-week run beginning January 6, 2020. Early episodes of the series were filmed at the Tyler Perry Studios in Atlanta. While later episodes were filmed at Trilith Studios in Fayetteville, Georgia.

== See also ==
- James Sexton (divorce lawyer) - recurring segment “How to Stay in Love” on the Steve Harvey show
