= Inside the Madness: Kentucky Basketball =

- Genre: Reality
- Country of origin: United States
- Original language: English
- No. of seasons: 1
- No. of episodes: 10

Production
- Executive producers: Tom Capello; Jason Sciavicco; Alana Goldstein; Brandon Wilson
- Cinematography: Nick Roark
- Running time: 20–29 minutes
- Production companies: Crazy Legs Productions; Blue Eyes Entertainment

Original release
- Network: Facebook Watch
- Release: February 17 – April 2, 2018

Inside the Madness: Kentucky Basketball is an American reality series that premiered on February 17, 2018 on Facebook Watch. It follows the players of the University of Kentucky Men's Basketball team as they make their way through their current basketball season and gear up for the upcoming NCAA tournament.

== Premise ==
Inside the Madness: Kentucky Basketball give viewers "unprecedented access to the team and head coach John Calipari as they navigate through the season, prepare for the NCAA Tournament run and shape young men for the rest of their lives."

== Production ==
=== Development ===
On February 14, 2018, it was announced that Facebook Watch had ordered a first season of show consisting of ten episodes. Executive producer were reported to include Tom Cappello and Jason Sciavicco. Episodes were expected to be released on Saturdays beginning on February 17, 2018.

=== Marketing ===
Simultaneously with the initial series announcement, Facebook released a trailer for the first season of the show.

== Episodes ==
No.	Title	Original release date
1	"We Win Or We Learn"	February 17, 2018
2	"The Not So Big Easy"	February 24, 2018
3	"Rivalry"	March 3, 2018
4	"Fluid Motion"	March 10, 2018
5	"Return Of The Jarred"	March 14, 2018
6	"Hard Knox"	March 17, 2018
7	"Catching Up With The Caliparis"	March 21, 2018
8	"Rock Bottom"	March 24, 2018
9	"Hami Time"	March 31, 2018
10	"Marching Forward"	April 2, 2018

== See also ==
- List of original programs distributed by Facebook Watch
- Kentucky Wildcats men's basketball
