= Mike Lebovitz =

American stand-up comedian

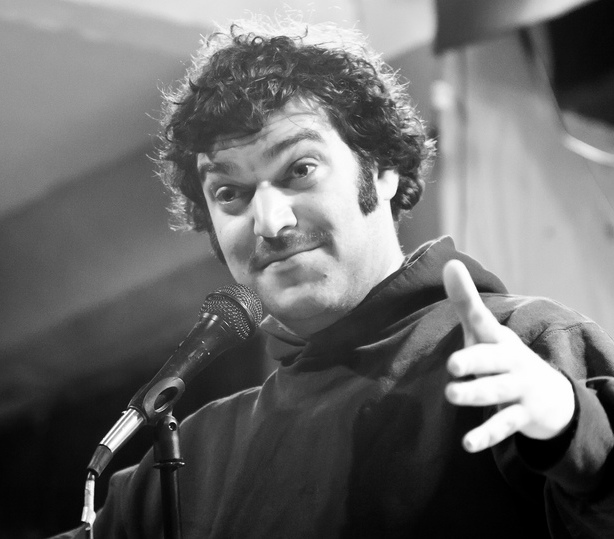
- Lebovitz in 2010
- Born: 1979 or 1980 (age 46–47); Chicago, Illinois, U.S.
- Education: Oberlin College
- Occupation: Stand-up comedian
- Years active: 2002–present
- Known for: Comedians You Should Know
- Website: mikelebovitz.net

Mike Lebovitz is an American stand-up comedian from Chicago now living in New York. He is a co-founding member of the Comedians You Should Know collective, a nationally known group based in Chicago, New York, and Los Angeles. Sean Ely of the Chicago Tribune wrote that Lebovitz "has helped define the stand-up comedy scene in Chicago."

His 2021 solo comedy album, Two Slob Household, released on Stand Up! Records, reached No. 2 on the iTunes comedy chart. Comedians You Should Know's self-titled 2011 group album reached No. 1 on the iTunes comedy chart.

== Career ==
Lebovitz began performing improv sketch comedy in 2002, working with both Improv Olympics and The Second City. He moved into solo stand-up comedy in 2007. He is a co-founder, host and producer of Comedians You Should Know, which formed in 2008 in Chicago. In 2015, Lebovitz moved to New York, where he started a new offshoot of Comedians You Should Know the following year. (A Los Angeles chapter of CYSK was also formed in 2015.)

Lebovitz's comic style is often self-deprecating and was described by the Chicago Tribune as "a giant, lovable ball of energy," and "focused yet silly" by Cincinnati CityBeat. He tends to avoid politics in favor of observational comedy and stories from his life as a married father of three children.

Lebovitz was named one of Chicago's best comics in 2014 by Chicago magazine.

In 2015, Lebovitz performed on season 9 of the NBC series Last Comic Standing. He also appeared in a 2018 episode of HBO's The Deuce, After After Party, and the 2009 webseries Assisted Living.

Lebovitz won the international competition at the 2013 Montreux Comedy Festival in Switzerland, an offshoot of the Montreux Jazz Festival. He has performed at the Bridgetown Comedy Festival, Tig Notaro's Bentzen Ball, Montreal's Just For Laughs, and the Brooklyn Comedy Festival.

=== Albums ===
Lebovitz's album Two Slob Household was recorded in 2014 in Chicago and released on Stand Up! Records in 2021. It features album-cover artwork by Tom Bunk of Mad Magazine and Garbage Pail Kids. Reviewing it for the publication ChicagoNow, Teme Ring wrote that "Mike Lebovitz proves that the year is just getting better." Devin Keast of the podcast Small Tea gave a positive review of the album, saying "It feels like a party. It's warm, it's fun."

=== Podcasts ===
Lebovitz hosts two podcasts: Mike Lebovitz Top Secret Underground Podcast, a solo comedy podcast, and The Comedian and the Philosopher, a podcast about philosophical issues co-hosted with Duncan Gale.

== Personal life ==
Lebovitz grew up on the south side of Chicago in the Hyde Park neighborhood. His father is a mathematician. He is married with three children and lives in upstate New York. He is half Jewish.

== Discography ==
- Mike Lebovitz, Two Slob Household (Stand Up! Records, 2021)
- Comedians You Should Know, Comedians You Should Know (Red Bar Comedy, 2011)
