= You Kiddin' Me =

- Genre: Reality; Hidden camera; Practical joke
- Directed by: Anthony Gonzales
- Country of origin: United States
- Original language: English
- No. of seasons: 1
- No. of episodes: 10

Production
- Executive producers: Jennifer O'Connell; Brian Tannenbaum; Kim Kardashian; Peter M. Cohen; Melissa Stokes
- Cinematography: Sebastian Jungwirth
- Running time: 13–15 minutes
- Production companies: KKW Kontent; Lionsgate Television

Original release
- Network: Facebook Watch
- Release: September 22 – November 24, 2018

You Kiddin' Me is an American hidden camera practical joke reality show series that premiered on September 22, 2018, on Facebook Watch.

== Premise ==
You Kiddin' Me is described as "a comedic prank series where kids are in charge and celebrities must do everything their own children say. The series peeks into the family relationships of Hollywood stars as children prank their famous parents and an unsuspecting public."

== Production ==
On March 2, 2018, it was announced that Facebook had given the production a series order for a first season consisting of ten episodes. Executive producers are set to include Kim Kardashian, Jennifer O'Connell, Brian Tannenbaum, Peter M. Cohen, and Melissa Stokes. Production companies involved in the series are slated to consist of Lionsgate Television. On September 7, 2018, it was announced that the series would premiere on September 22, 2018.

== Episodes ==
No.	Title	Victim	Prankster(s)	Original release date
1	"Kim Kardashian West & Sisters Prank Kris Jenner"	Kris Jenner	Kim Kardashian, Kourtney Kardashian, & Kendall Jenner	September 22, 2018
2	"T.I.'s Sons Put 'Stainz' On Fashion"	T.I.	King Harris & Major Harris	September 29, 2018
3	"Lisa Rinna Teaches Cooking Chaos"	Lisa Rinna	Delilah Hamlin & Amelia Hamlin	October 6, 2018
4	"Zoe Saldana Gets Spooked By Her Sisters"	Zoe Saldana	Cisely Saldana & Mariel Saldana	October 13, 2018
5	"French Montana Hosts A New Talk Show"	French Montana	Ayoub Kharbouch	October 20, 2018
6	"Sara Evans Goes A Little Bit Country And Completely Nutty"	Sara Evans	Audrey Schelske & Olivia Schelske	October 27, 2018
7	"Daniel Bryan Sells Out The Bella Twins"	The Bella Twins	Daniel Bryan	November 3, 2018
8	"Gabriel "Fluffy" Iglesias Stand-Up Gone Wrong"	Gabriel Iglesias	Austin Meloche	November 10, 2018
9	"La La Anthony's Book Party Goes Beyond Bizarre"	La La Anthony	Kyan Anthony	November 17, 2018
10	"David Foster Goes Full Diva"	David Foster	Erin Foster & Sara Foster	November 24, 2018

== Reception ==
In a negative review, The Ringer's Kate Knibbs criticized the series saying, "Every era gets the Punk'd it deserves, and we are living through a spectacularly dumb and cruel moment. There’s something fitting about how Facebook, notorious for flooding the internet with viral garbage, debuted an accidental, weirdly cruel anti-comedy in its push for original content. You Kiddin’ Me?! isn't funny."

== See also ==
- List of original programs distributed by Facebook Watch
