= More in Common (TV series) =

- Presented by: Michael Koenigs
- Country of origin: United States
- Original language: English
- No. of seasons: 3
- No. of episodes: 58

Production
- Executive producer: Michael Koenigs
- Producer: Chris Casey Jordan Fuller Elie Sokoloff
- Production location: ABC - New York
- Production company: Localish

Original release
- Network: ABC
- Release: July 21, 2018 – 2022

More in Common is an American news program hosted by Michael Koenigs that airs on ABC television and Hulu. It reaches an audience of over 17 million TV households and 21 million followers across ABC's social platforms. In March 2020, the show launched a weekly spin-off series called Check In.

== Format ==
More in Common is about "people from different backgrounds coming together in unexpected ways."

== Production ==
On February 12, 2018, it was announced that Facebook was developing a news section within its streaming service Facebook Watch to feature breaking news stories. The news section was set to be overseen by Facebook's head of news partnerships Campbell Brown.

On July 11, 2018, following the announcement of Facebook's initial slate of news programs, it was announced that Facebook's next roster of partners for their news section on Facebook Watch would include ABC-owned news stations. The news program the two companies developed was revealed to be titled More in Common.

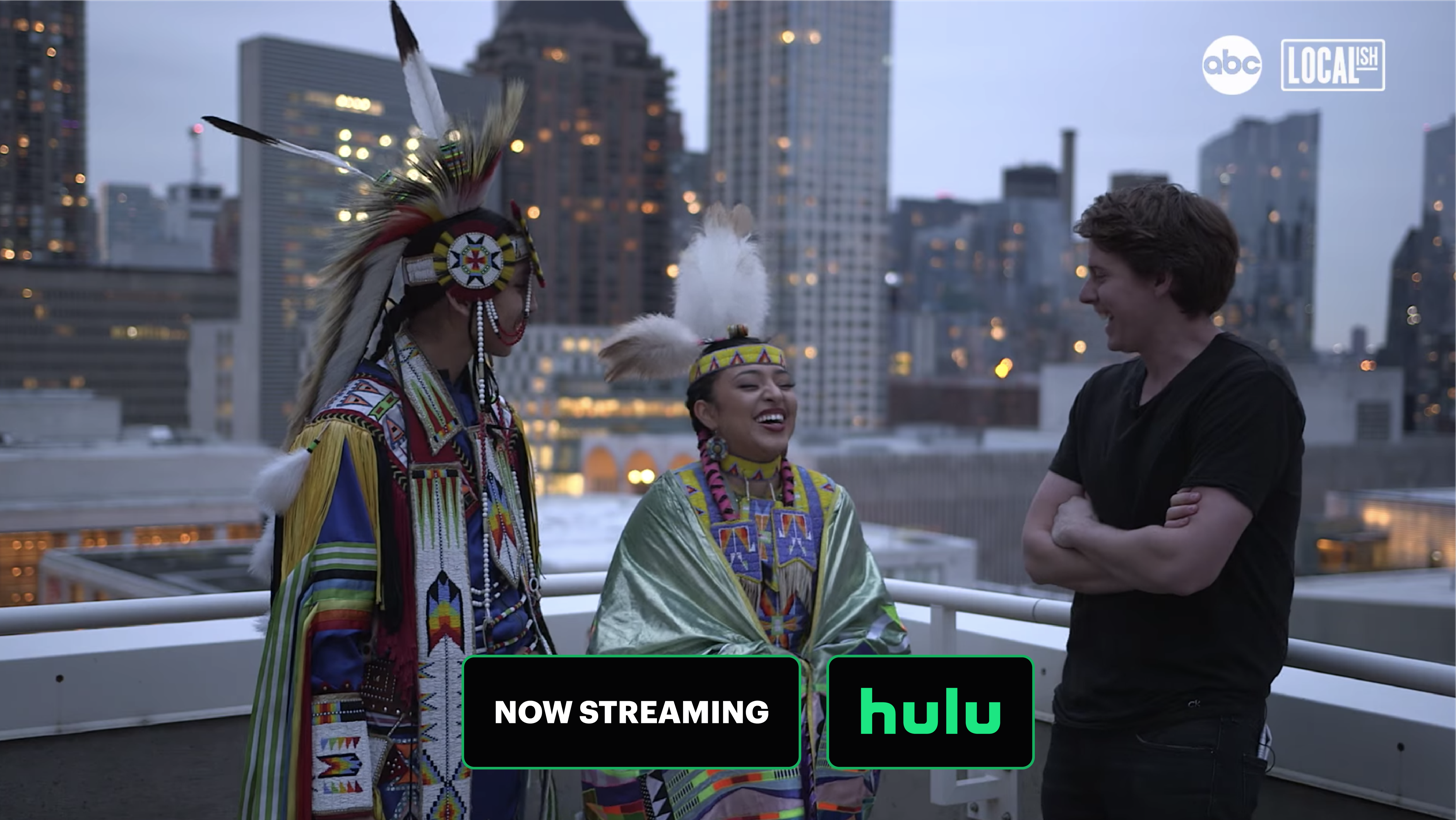
Host Michael Koenigs interviews two members of the Lenape tribe.

On July 20, 2018, it was announced that the show would be executive produced by Michael Koenigs and that it would premiere on July 21, 2018. It was further reported that the ABC Owned Television Stations Group would feature episodes of the show on broadcast TV in major markets across the US including WABC in New York City, KABC in Los Angeles, WLS in Chicago, WPVI in Philadelphia, KGO in San Francisco, KTRK in Houston, WTVD in Raleigh/Durham, and KFSN in Fresno.

On April 3, 2021, Hulu began streaming 13 original episodes of the show to its 41 million subscribers.

As of now, Facebook Watch has discontinued its original programming and the series is no longer airing.
