= Behind the Wall: Bubba Wallace =

US television program

- Genre: Reality
- Directed by: Griffin Van Malssen
- Starring: Bubba Wallace; Amanda Carter; Ryan Blaney; Desiree Wallace; Drew Blickensderfer; Richard Petty
- Country of origin: United States
- Original language: English
- No. of seasons: 1
- No. of episodes: 8

Production
- Executive producer: Tally Hair
- Producer: Jeff Schafer
- Cinematography: Zack Cook
- Running time: 11–16 minutes
- Production companies: NASCAR Productions; NASCAR Digital Media

Original release
- Network: Facebook Watch
- Release: February 15 – February 22, 2018

Behind the Wall: Bubba Wallace is an American reality web series that premiered on February 15, 2018 on Facebook Watch. It follows NASCAR driver Bubba Wallace as he prepares to compete in his first Daytona 500.

== Premise ==
Behind the Wall: Bubba Wallace follows "Wallace’s road to the Daytona International Speedway, from his earliest racing days to his debut in the Monster Energy NASCAR Cup Series as the new full-time driver of the No. 43 Chevrolet Camaro ZL1 for Richard Petty Motorsports."

== Production ==
=== Development ===
On February 13, 2018, it was announced that Facebook Watch had ordered a first season of Behind the Wall: Bubba Wallace, a new reality series featuring NASCAR driver Bubba Wallace. It was reported that Facebook was producing the series with NASCAR Productions in association with NASCAR Digital Media.

=== Marketing ===
Simultaneously with the initial series announcement, Facebook released a trailer for the first season of the show.

== Episodes ==
No.	Title	Original release date
1	"I Am The One"	February 15, 2018
2	"Someone To Look Up To"	February 15, 2018
3	"Vision Quest"	February 16, 2018
4	"A Mother's Son"	February 16, 2018
5	"Back on Track"	February 17, 2018
6	"This Is It"	February 17, 2018
7	"Embrace It"	February 22, 2018
8	"My First Daytona 500"	February 22, 2018

== See also ==
- List of original programs distributed by Facebook Watch
