= Fly Guys =

- Genre: Reality
- Country of origin: United States
- Original language: English
- No. of seasons: 1
- No. of episodes: 10

Production
- Executive producers: Jonathan Skogmo; Josh Entman
- Running time: 12–15 minutes
- Production company: Jukin Media

Original release
- Network: Facebook Watch
- Release: February 2 – April 6, 2018

Fly Guys is an American reality web series that premiered on February 2, 2018 on Facebook Watch. It follows a group of acrobats and stunt artists as they carry out a new and difficult stunt in each episode.

== Premise ==
Fly Guys follows "an all-star crew of Europe’s most talented acrobats and professional stunt performers. Each episode explores what it takes to safely and successfully pull off a world-class stunt."

== Production ==
=== Development ===
On January 16, 2018, it was announced that Facebook Watch had given the production a series order for a first season consisting of ten episodes. Executive producers are set to include Jonathan Skogmo and Josh Entman. The animated graphics for 10 episodes are produced and created by Marina Gvozdeva and Kate Presbury. Production companies involved with the series include Jukin Media.

=== Marketing ===
Simultaneously with the initial series announcement, Facebook released a trailer for the first season of the show.

== Episodes ==
| No. | Title | Original release date |
|---|---|---|
| 1 | "Human Body Launch" | February 2, 2018 |
| 2 | "Runaway Steam Train" | February 9, 2018 |
| 3 | "Conquering the Quarry" | February 16, 2018 |
| 4 | "Dragon's Eye Leap" | February 23, 2018 |
| 5 | "The Great Castle Escape" | March 2, 2018 |
| 6 | "The Big Swing" | March 9, 2018 |
| 7 | "Nothing But Net" | March 16, 2018 |
| 8 | "POV Parkour Project" | March 23, 2018 |
| 9 | "Acrobatic Fire Slam" | March 30, 2018 |
| 10 | "Do You Even Tread, Bro?" | April 6, 2018 |

== See also ==
- List of original programs distributed by Facebook Watch
