= Double Take (American TV series) =

American practical joke reality show series

- Genre: Reality; Hidden camera; Practical joke
- Starring: Chris Jones
- Country of origin: United States
- Original language: English
- No. of seasons: 1
- No. of episodes: 6

Production
- Executive producers: Nick Rigg; John Cena; Simon Thomas; Adam Dolgins; Ken Schwab; David Bulhack; David George
- Running time: 12–15 minutes
- Production companies: Hard Nocks South Productions; Loud Television; Ken Schwab Media

Original release
- Network: Facebook Watch
- Release: October 24, 2018

Double Take is an American hidden camera/practical joke reality show series that premiered on October 24, 2018, on Facebook Watch.

== Premise ==
Double Take follows hypnotist Chris Jones as he "conspires with a different celebrity to give one adoring fan the surprise of a lifetime: meeting and interacting with their idol in a range of everyday circumstances, though – under hypnosis – unable to recognize them."

== Production ==
=== Development ===
On August 22, 2018, it was announced that Facebook had given the production a series order for a first season consisting of six episodes. Executive producers were expected to include John Cena, Nick Rigg, David George, Simon Thomas, Adam Dolgins, Ken Schwab, and David Bulhack. Production companies involved in the series were slated to consist of Hard Nocks South Productions, Loud Television, and Ken Schwab Media.

=== Casting ===
Alongside the series order announcement, it was confirmed that the series would star hypnotist Chris Jones and feature guests including John Cena, Adam Rippon, Steve-O, NeNe Leakes, Gabriel Iglesias, and Pamela Anderson.

== Episodes ==
No.	Title	Featured guest	Original release date
1	"John Cena Gives His Superfan The Surprise Of A Lifetime"	John Cena	October 24, 2018
2	"Pamela Anderson Stands Up Her Date"	Pamela Anderson	October 24, 2018
3	"Gabriel "Fluffy" Iglesias Throws His Biggest Fan Under The Bus"	Gabriel Iglesias	October 24, 2018
4	"Nene Leakes Tries To Steal The Spotlight From Her Biggest Fan"	Nene Leakes	October 24, 2018
5	"Adam Rippon Directs His #1 Fan In A Disastrous Commercial"	Adam Rippon	October 24, 2018
6	"Steve-O Puts His Superfan To The Test"	Steve-O	October 24, 2018

== See also ==
- List of original programs distributed by Facebook Watch
