= Bear Grylls: Face the Wild =

American reality television series

- Genre: Reality
- Starring: Bear Grylls
- Country of origin: United States
- Original language: English
- No. of seasons: 1
- No. of episodes: 10

Production
- Executive producers: Bear Grylls; Delbert Shoopman; Chris Grant; Drew Buckley; Rob Buchta; Justin Dudek
- Running time: 19–27 minutes
- Production companies: Bear Grylls Ventures; Electus

Original release
- Network: Facebook Watch
- Release: March 21 – May 23, 2018

Bear Grylls: Face the Wild is an American reality show series that premiered on March 21, 2018, on Facebook Watch. It follows adventurer Bear Grylls as he leads a select few of his fans out into the wilderness as they share personal stories from their lives.

== Premise ==
Bear Grylls: Face the Wild features "10 of Grylls’ fans who have been invited to accompany him on an adventure to face the wild. Participants will share their stories as Bear pushes them out of their comfort zones and teaches them how the wild can be not only eye-opening, but also ultimately empowering."

== Production ==
On January 16, 2018, it was announced that Facebook Watch had ordered a first season of Bear Grylls: Face the Wild, a new reality series starring adventurer Bear Grylls. Executive producers are set to include Grylls, Delbert Shoopman, Chris Grant, Drew Buckley, Rob Buchta, and Justin Dudek. Production companies involved with the series include Bear Grylls Ventures and Electus.

Grylls and his production staff found the season's participants by putting out an open call online for video applications in October 2017. By the time the submission period was over, they had received over 500,000 submissions. The first season was filmed in the Sierra Nevada mountain region in California. The area was ideal for the production due to high mountains, desert, canyons, ravines, and forests. This allowed the series to feature different terrains and provided a central location for participants to get to that includes immense wilderness. He has said that he found Facebook to be a good fit for the series as a more conventional network, such as NBC, would most likely be disinterested in the notion of showcasing everyday people as opposed to the celebrities featured in Running Wild with Bear Grylls.

== Episodes ==
No.	Title	Original release date
1	"Mom Gone Wild"	March 21, 2018
2	"Mission Possible"	March 28, 2018
3	"Always Bet on Dot"	April 4, 2018
4	"Schooled By a Girl Scout"	April 11, 2018
5	"Vision Quest"	April 18, 2018
6	"Hurricane Lester"	April 25, 2018
7	"Wander Woman"	May 2, 2018
8	"Kick the Bucket-List"	May 9, 2018
9	"L.A. Unplugged"	May 16, 2018
10	"Southern Discomfort"	May 23, 2018

== Release ==
On March 13, 2018, Facebook released the first official trailer for the series.

== See also ==
- List of original programs distributed by Facebook Watch
