= RelationShipped =

- Genre: Reality; Dating game show
- Country of origin: United States
- Original language: English
- No. of seasons: 2
- No. of episodes: 38

Production
- Executive producer: Tom Shelly
- Production locations: Los Angeles, California
- Editor: Kevin Manning
- Running time: 13–31 minutes
- Production company: BuzzFeed Motion Pictures

Original release
- Network: Facebook Watch
- Release: November 9, 2017 – November 15, 2018

RelationShipped is an American reality series that premiered on November 9, 2017, on Facebook Watch. The interactive series, produced by BuzzFeed, allows viewers to influence decisions and events in each episode. Facebook users select the show's protagonist, the "Suitor", from eligible single men in the first episode. He hosts female competitors in a Los Angeles–based mansion, where they each vie for his affection. In subsequent episodes, the audience has the ability to nominate new prospective competitors to be introduced, and the opportunity to select date ideas, amongst other decisions. New episodes are released twice weekly, on Monday and Thursday.

== Production ==
Episodes of the series air only days after they are filmed. This provides the show's Producers, with the ability to shape the narrative of the show as the audience would like to see it. BuzzFeed Motion Pictures', head of development Matthew Henick, has described the show saying, "We wanted to build a format that television audiences are familiar with, a dating format, but from the ground up for digital. Shooting and releasing it in real time allows the audience to affect the show and get involved in ways they couldn't before."

== Episodes ==
Season	Episodes	Originally released	
Season	Episodes	First released	Last released
1	18	November 9, 2017	January 11, 2018
2	20	September 10, 2018	November 15, 2018

=== Season 1 (2017–18) ===
No. overall	No. in season	Title	Original release date
1	1	"Vote For Love"	November 9, 2017
Five men compete for the opportunity to be the main bachelor at the center of this season of the show. They include Eric V., Ron Y., Matt M., Jason S., and Garratt P.
2	2	"Two Girls, a Guy and a Mansion"	November 16, 2017
Jason S. is revealed to have been the audience's choice for this season's bachelor. The two women moving into the mansion with him are revealed to be Brandin and Shaelyn. Brandin is chosen to stay at the end of the episode.
3	3	"Cat Ladies & Cat Fights"	November 20, 2017
Jason and Brandin get to know one another as two new single women arrive, ready to get to know Jason. Brandin bonds with newbie Roberta and gets annoyed with younger woman Shannon.
4	4	"It's Getting Hot in Here"	November 23, 2017
Jason continues to deal with Brandin and Shannon's rivalry, as two new women, Amanda and Taylor, move into the mansion to date him. Jason tries to bring Taylor out of her shell during a magic show, and has a fairytale afternoon on a picnic with Amanda.
5	5	"There's Something About Julia?"	November 27, 2017
Jason takes Midwestern sweetheart Julia for a romantic dip in the Pacific, and goes salsa dancing with beautiful single-mom Heather. Meanwhile, Amanda and Taylor battle Brandin for Jason's attention at the mansion.
6	6	"A Tale of Two Tiffanys"	November 30, 2017
Jason takes Tiffany T. on a mile-high date, while he also gets to know world-traveler Tiffany H. as they make a meal for their date.
7	7	"Thank You, America!"	December 4, 2017
Jason is surprised when the fan-selected woman, Alex, arrives at the mansion. Meanwhile tensions among the other women bring Brandin to tears.
8	8	"Brandin Over Troubled Waters?"	December 7, 2017
Jason must choose only two of the five women to take on dates. The women in the mansion confront Jason with their concerns regarding Brandin.
9	9	"Moving In, Moving Out"	December 11, 2017
After a food-truck date with Julia, Jason celebrates his move into the main house, only to have more drama with Brandin put an end to the party. When things come to a head, Brandin decides to leave the mansion.
10	10	"Sneaking Through the Window"	December 14, 2017
After the fallout from Brandin's departure, things get flirty on a fun group date and when Alex has a secret overnight visit, Jason struggles to decide who he will eliminate next.
11	11	"What Is She Doing With That Stethoscope?"	December 18, 2017
The final four women vie to be Jason's choice on a lavish and cheap date. A woman, Kelsey, nominated by her friend surprises Jason and the women just before the elimination, and one woman spends the night in Jason’s bed.
12	12	"Let’s Get Twisted"	December 21, 2017
Jason gets to know the audience nominated new-girl Kelsey, while dealing with fallout after his tryst with Alex is exposed to the other women in the mansion.
13	13	"Look Who's Back!"	December 25, 2017
An eliminated woman, Roberta, returns to surprise Jason and act as his wing-woman by testing the ladies with hot male houseguests.
14	14	"The One Where Jason Cries"	December 28, 2017
After learning that Jason and Julia spent the night together, Alex and both Tiffanys take the opportunity to bond with Jason before eliminations. One woman is sent home.
15	15	"And Then There Were Three"	January 1, 2018
Jason chooses Alex for an audience chosen lavish winter wonderland date, while he takes Tiffany T on an audience chosen cheap date to the animal shelter. One woman is eliminated.
16	16	"Grilled by Grandma"	January 4, 2018
When the mansion is surprised by the arrival of Jason's family and friend, the final two women are on their best behavior to win approval.
17	17	"Magical White Chocolate"	January 8, 2018
When the final two women’s loved ones surprise the household, they turn the tables on Jason and put him in the hot seat to see if he measures up to their standards.
18	18	"Sweet Home Arizona"	January 11, 2018
The two final women each design a date for Jason. And Jason brings them to his hometown, where he will decide which woman he will invite to move to his hometown. Jason chooses Alex.

=== Season 2 (2018) ===
No. overall	No. in season	Title	Original release date
19	1	"What's With Avagay Anyway?"	September 10, 2018
20	2	"Grandparents Called It Courting"	September 13, 2018
21	3	"Thats The Name Of My Dog"	September 17, 2018
22	4	"I Can Cry If I Want To"	September 20, 2018
23	5	"Muffin-Gate"	September 24, 2018
24	6	"Friendzoned"	September 27, 2018
25	7	"Someone Gets Lucky"	October 1, 2018
26	8	"Who's Next"	October 4, 2018
27	9	"Kat's Out of the Bag"	October 8, 2018
28	10	"Who's Next"	October 11, 2018
29	11	"Spilling The "T""	October 15, 2018
30	12	"Girls' Night Out"	October 18, 2018
31	13	"Logan's Ex Arrives"	October 22, 2018
32	14	"Truth or Dare"	October 25, 2018
33	15	"I'm Definitely Falling For You"	October 29, 2018
34	16	"She's Your Ex For A Reason"	November 1, 2018
35	17	"OG Krystal Returns"	November 5, 2018
36	18	"Skylar's Dad's Not Happy"	November 8, 2018
37	19	"Logan's Parents Make A Stand"	November 12, 2018
38	20	"Logan Is In Love"	November 15, 2018

== Call-out order ==
Episode
2	3	4	5	6	7	8	9	10	11	12	13	14	15	16	17	18
Shaelyn	Roberta	Shannon	Taylor	Heather	Amanda	Brandin	Brandin	Julia	Julia	Kelsey	Julia	Julia	Tiffany T.	Tiffany H.	Tiffany H.	Alex
Brandin	Brandin	Brandin	Brandin	Brandin	Brandin	Julia	Julia	Tiffany T.	Tiffany T.	Julia	Tiffany T.	Tiffany T.	Tiffany H.	Alex	Alex	Tiffany H.
	Shannon	Amanda	Amanda	Amanda	Julia	Tiffany T.	Tiffany T.	Tiffany H.	Tiffany H.	Tiffany T.	Tiffany H.	Tiffany H.	Alex			
		Taylor	Julia	Julia	Tiffany T.	Tiffany H.	Tiffany H.	Alex	Alex	Tiffany H.	Alex	Alex				
			Heather	Tiffany T.	Tiffany H.	Alex	Alex		Kelsey	Alex						
				Tiffany H.	Alex											

The contestant was introduced in this episode
The contestant was eliminated
The contestant quit
The contestant won the competition

== Reception ==
The series has received a mixed to negative reception since its premiere. The Guardian's Jake Nevins criticized the show when saying, "It’ll all appear a bit ham-fisted to fans of The Bachelor and its chintzy elegance; worse, for those who buy into prevailing millennial stereotypes, it’ll be nothing short of unwatchable, a confirmation that we’re as self-involved and phone-obsessed as the world believes us to be."

== See also ==
- List of original programs distributed by Facebook Watch
