= Help Us Get Married =

- Genre: Reality
- Starring: Tamera Mowry-Housley
- Composer: Extreme Music
- Country of origin: United States
- Original language: English
- No. of seasons: 1
- No. of episodes: 12

Production
- Executive producers: Rhett Bachner; Brien Meagher; Richard Courtney
- Producer: Phil Barbb
- Cinematography: Stas Tagios; Goro Toshima; Zafer Ulkucu
- Running time: 18–30 minutes
- Production company: Thumb Candy Media

Original release
- Network: Facebook Watch
- Release: May 3 – July 19, 2018

Help Us Get Married is an American reality series that premiered on May 3, 2018 on Facebook Watch. The series is hosted by Tamera Mowry-Housley and follows three couples who are trying to plan their weddings with the help of the Facebook community.

== Premise ==
Help Us Get Married features "three newly engaged couples from across America who are planning their weddings with the help of the Facebook community."

On Thursday nights, pre-filmed episodes document the arguments and disagreements the couples have regarding their weddings and allow viewers the opportunity to vote in polls to help them solve their issues. Then on Friday nights, the results of the previous nights polling are revealed. Decisions the audience help to make include deciding on the venue and picking the perfect dress. In the season finale, the audience will get to see the weddings they helped plan.

== Production ==
=== Development ===
On April 27, 2018, it was announced that Facebook had ordered a first season of the series with a premiere date set for May 3, 2018. Executive producers were reported to consist of Rhett Bachner, Brien Meagher, and Richard Courtneyk. Production companies involved with the series were set to include Thumb Candy Media.

== Episodes ==
No.	Title	Original release date
1	"Everyone Has An Opinion"	May 3, 2018
2	"Parents Just Don't Understand"	May 10, 2018
3	"May The Best Man Win"	May 17, 2018
4	"Man Tears"	May 24, 2018
5	"Broken Hollywood Dreams?"	May 31, 2018
6	"Speak To My Face, Girl"	June 7, 2018
7	"I Got Drunk, She Got Pregnant"	June 14, 2018
8	"Bubble, But..."	June 21, 2018
9	"His Ex, Her Bridesmaid"	June 28, 2018
10	"Victoria's Not-So-Secret"	July 5, 2018
11	"No Time For Cold Feet"	July 12, 2018
12	"I Do (But I Don't)"	July 19, 2018

== Release ==
=== Marketing ===
Alongside the series announcement, Facebook released the first official trailer for the series.

== See also ==
- List of original programs distributed by Facebook Watch
