= Bill Murray & Brian Doyle-Murray's Extra Innings =

American reality television series

- Genre: Reality; Sports; Comedy
- Starring: Bill Murray; Brian Doyle-Murray
- Opening theme: "The Thing About Baseball" by Bill Murray
- Country of origin: United States
- Original language: English
- No. of seasons: 1
- No. of episodes: 10

Production
- Executive producers: Dub Cornett; Bill Murray; Brian Doyle-Murray
- Producer: Victoria Lily Shaffer
- Cinematography: Anna Schwaber
- Editor: Jack Alvino
- Running time: 9–11 minutes
- Production company: Oso Studios

Original release
- Network: Facebook Watch
- Release: November 20, 2017 – January 22, 2018

Bill Murray & Brian Doyle-Murray's Extra Innings is an American reality web series that premiered on November 20, 2017 on Facebook Watch. This show follows actors and brothers Bill Murray and Brian Doyle-Murray as they visit Minor League ballparks across the country, immersing themselves in the local culture and interacting with the different communities. Facebook ordered a ten episode first season of the show which premiered on November 20, 2017 with all subsequent episodes airing on the following Mondays.

== Production ==
=== Development ===
Bill Murray described the show as “a little something to fill a baseball fan’s off-season hole in the heart.” In the series, the actors will visit minor league baseball teams including the Charleston RiverDogs, St. Paul Saints, Martha's Vineyard Sharks, and Kansas City T-Bones. They also spend time at the MLB Urban Youth Academy and the Negro Leagues Baseball Museum.

The idea for the show sprang from a chance meeting between Doyle-Murray and Oso founder Dub Cornett at a mutual friend’s birthday party. Oso Studios brought the concept to Ricky Van Veen, Facebook’s head of global creative strategy in charge of original entertainment content, who greenlit it immediately. The show was shot over the course of three months during the summer. Cornett took a relatively small crew on the road that included producer Victoria Shaffer, a camera operator, a sound tech and a PA.

=== Music ===
Murray performs the theme song for the show, "The Thing About Baseball", which he wrote alongside Doyle-Murray and Paul Shaffer.

=== Caddyshack ===
Murray reprised his role of Carl Spackler from the film Caddyshack in the show's premiere episode.

== Episodes ==
No. overall	No. in season	Title	Original release date
1	1	"Get ’Em: Martha’s Vineyard Sharks, Part 1"	November 20, 2017
2	2	"Objects May Leave the Field: Martha’s Vineyard Sharks, Part 2"	November 27, 2017
3	3	"There’s an Eclipse Tomorrow?: Charleston Riverdogs, Part 1"	December 4, 2017
4	4	"Totality: Charleston Riverdogs, Part 2"	December 11, 2017
5	5	"This is Livin’: St. Paul Saints, Part 1"	December 18, 2017
6	6	"Yum, Yum, Eat ’Em Up: St. Paul Saints, Part 2"	December 25, 2017
7	7	"Major League Citizens: Kansas City MLB Urban Youth Academy"	January 1, 2018
8	8	"Hey, Ernie: Negro Leagues Baseball Museum, Kansas City"	January 8, 2018
9	9	"Perfect Pitch: Kansas City T-Bones"	January 15, 2018
10	10	"The Thing About Baseball: Writing the Theme Song"	January 22, 2018

== Awards and nominations ==
Year	Ceremony	Category	Recipient(s)	Result	Ref.
2018	39th Annual Telly Awards	Online: Series: Webseries – Non-Scripted	Bill Murray & Brian Doyle-Murray's Extra Innings	Bronze Winner	

== See also ==
- List of original programs distributed by Facebook Watch
