= Bear Grylls: Mission Survive =

British reality television show

- Genre: Reality
- Presented by: Bear Grylls
- Starring: Megan Hine; Scott Heffield
- Voices of: Sheridan Smith (2015); Elizabeth Carling (2016)
- Country of origin: United Kingdom
- Original language: English
- No. of series: 2
- No. of episodes: 12

Production
- Production locations: Costa Rica (Series 1); South Africa (Series 2)
- Running time: 60 minutes (inc. adverts)

Original release
- Network: ITV
- Release: 20 February 2015 – 7 April 2016

Bear Grylls: Mission Survive is a reality television show presented by Bear Grylls featuring eight celebrities on a 12-day survival mission. The celebrities are tested on fundamental principles of survival, and have to navigate through difficult terrains.

Grylls is assisted by survival expert Megan Hine and former commando Scott Heffield, who accompany the celebrities. Their assessment of how the celebrities performed helps Grylls decide whom to eliminate in each episode. The show was filmed in Costa Rica for the first series and moved to South Africa for the second series in 2016.

The first series aired in 2015 and was won by DJ and model Vogue Williams. Shortly after the first series aired, it was announced that the show would return in 2016 and was won by Arsenal L.F.C. player Alex Scott.

On 30 May 2016, ITV announced that Bear Grylls: Mission Survive would not be returning for a third series due to the falling ratings of series two.

== Series 1 (2015) ==
=== Participants ===
The eight celebrities taking part in the series were announced on 4 February 2015:

Celebrity	Known for	Status
Max George	The Wanted singer	Eliminated 1st on 27 February 2015
Jamelia	Singer & Loose Women panelist	Eliminated 2nd on 6 March 2015
Laurence Fox	Lewis actor & singer	Eliminated 3rd on 13 March 2015
Emilia Fox	Film & television actress	Eliminated 4th on 13 March 2015
Tom Rosenthal	Comedian	Eliminated 5th on 20 March 2015
Kelly Holmes	Olympic middle distance runner	Runners-up on 3 April 2015
Mike Tindall	Former England rugby player	Runners-up on 3 April 2015
Vogue Williams	DJ, model & presenter	Winner on 3 April 2015

=== Results summary ===
Celebrities	Episodes						Eliminated	Reason
Celebrities	1 ^{1}	2	3	4 ^{2}	5	6	Eliminated	Reason
Vogue						Winner	Day 12	No reason given
Mike						Runner-up	Day 12	No reason given
Kelly						Runner-up	Day 12	No reason given
Tom					OUT		Day 10	Forgetting parts of kit twice
Emilia				OUT			Day 8	Negative attitude
Laurence				OUT			Day 8	Suffered from trench foot and acted rashly
Jamelia			OUT				Day 6	Not a team player
Max		OUT					Day 4	Safety concerns

Colour key:

Celebrity got through to the next episode.
Celebrity was eliminated.
Celebrity was the series runner-up.
Celebrity was the series winner.

^{^Note 1} No elimination this week
^{^Note 2} Double elimination this week

== Series 2 (2016) ==
The show returned for a second series on 3 March 2016. Coronation Street actor Ryan Thomas was due to participate in the series, but was dropped from the line-up in 2015.

=== Participants ===
The seven celebrities taking part in the series were announced on 18 February 2016:

Celebrity	Known for	Status
Chelsee Healey	Former Waterloo Road actress	Eliminated 1st on 3 March 2016
Stuart Pearce	Football manager	Eliminated 2nd on 10 March 2016
Neil Morrissey	Actor	Eliminated 3rd on 17 March 2016
Michelle Collins	Former EastEnders and Coronation Street actress	Eliminated 4th on 31 March 2016
Jason Gardiner	Dancing on Ice judge	Runners-up on 7 April 2016
Samantha Barks	Stage & screen actress	Runners-up on 7 April 2016
Alex Scott	Arsenal L.F.C. player	Winner on 7 April 2016

=== Results summary ===
Celebrities	Episodes						Eliminated	Reason
Celebrities	1	2	3	4*	5	6	Eliminated	Reason
Alex						Winner	Day 12	No reason given
Samantha						Runner-up	Day 12	No reason given
Jason						Runner-up	Day 12	No reason given
Michelle					OUT		Day 10	Physically weak
Neil			OUT				Day 6	Waning mind strength
Stuart		OUT					Day 4	Reckless leadership
Chelsee	OUT						Day 2	Lack of commitment

Colour key:

Celebrity got through to the next episode.
Celebrity was eliminated.
Celebrity was the series runner-up.
Celebrity was the series winner.

- There was no elimination in Episode 4.

== Ratings ==
Episode viewing figures from BARB. Viewing figures do not include numbers from ITV HD or ITV +1.

=== Series 1 (2015) ===
Episode no.	Air date	Viewers (millions)	ITV weekly ranking
1	20 February 2015	3.18	17
2	27 February 2015	3.42	17
3	6 March 2015	3.28	17
4	13 March 2015	2.81	22
5	20 March 2015	2.81	23
6	3 April 2015	2.96	20

=== Series 2 (2016) ===
Episode no.	Air date	Viewers (millions)	ITV weekly ranking
1	3 March 2016	2.84	27
2	10 March 2016	—N/a	Outside Top 30
3	17 March 2016	—N/a	Outside Top 30
4	24 March 2016	—N/a	Outside Top 30
5	31 March 2016	—N/a	Outside Top 30
6	7 April 2016	—N/a	Outside Top 30
