= 2017 in Italian television =

This is a list of Italian television related events from 2017.

== Debuts ==
=== RAI ===
==== Serials ====
- I bastardi di Pizzofalcone ("The Bastards of Pizzofalcone") – by Alessandro D'Alatri and Carlo Carlei, with Alessandro Gassmann, Carolina Crescentini and Massimiliano Gallo, from the Maurizio De Giovanni's novels; 3 seasons (till now). In the Naples hinterland, a police station composed almost entirely by cops transferred for disciplinary measures (included the hero of the series, the deputy chief Lojacono) fights against the crime and the mistrust of the authorities.
- La strada di casa ("The way for home") – by Riccardo Donna, with Alessio Boni and Lucrezia Lante Della Rovere; 2 seasons. The owner of a farm, awakened after five years of coma and without memory, has to regain his place in the family and, at the same time, to discover the truth about a series of crimes.
- La porta rossa ("The red door") – paranormal drama by Carmine Elia, with Gabriella Pession and Lino Guanciale, from a Carlo Lucarelli's idea, 2 seasons. The police superintendent Cagliostro, killed in a shooting, keep investigating as a ghost about his same murder.

== Television shows ==
=== RAI ===
==== Drama ====
- The music of silence – by Michael Radford, with Tony Sebastian and Luisa Ranieri; inspired by the life of Andrea Bocelli.
- Adesso tocca a me ("Now it's my turn") – biopic by Francesco Miccichè, with Cesare Bocci as Paolo Borsellino.

==== Miniseries ====
- Di padre in figlia ("From father to daughter") – by Riccardo Milani, with Alessio Boni and Cristiana Capotondi; 4 episodes. In Veneto, a family of grappa producers passes, within twenty years, from the patriarchate to the women power.
- Scomparsa ("Vanished") – by Fabrizio Costa, with Vanessa Incontrada and Giuseppe Zeno; 12 episodes. The intricate enquiry about the vanishing of two girls.
- Sirene ("Sirens") – fantasy comedy by Davide Marengo, with Valentina Bellè and Luca Argentero; 6 episodes. A family of sirens goes to live in the modern Naples.
- Sorelle ("Sisters") – by Cinzia Th Torrini, with Anna Valle; 6 episodes. Chiara, a successful woman lawyer, comes back in her native Matera to investigate about her sister's murder.

==== News and educational ====
- Divina bellezza ("Divine beauty") – by Alberto Angela; documentary about the history of Italian religious art.
- I mille giorni di mafia capitale ("The thousand days of Mafia capitale") – docufiction by Claudio Canepari and Giuseppe Ghinami; 6 episodes.
- Stanotte a Firenze ("Tonight in Florence") and Stanotte a Venezia ("Tonight in Venice") – art and history documentaries by Alberto Angela.

== Networks and services ==
=== Launches ===
Network	Type	Launch date	Notes	Source
Cine Sony	Cable and satellite	7 September		

=== Conversions and rebrandings ===
Old network name	New network name	Type	Conversion Date	Notes	Source

=== Closures ===
Network	Type	Closure date	Notes	Source
AXN	Cable and satellite	28 February		
Fine Living	Cable and satellite	22 October		
