= Mic Dispatch =

- Presented by: Natasha Del Toro
- Starring: Aaron Morrison; Jake Horowitz; Evan Ross Katz; Serena Daniari; Chantel Simpson
- Country of origin: United States
- Original language: English
- No. of seasons: 1
- No. of episodes: 55

Production
- Executive producers: Marc Paskin; Jake Horowitz
- Producers: Shivan Sarna; Rhonda Elnaggar
- Running time: 5–19 minutes

Original release
- Network: Facebook Watch
- Release: July 17 – December 20, 2018

Mic Dispatch is an American news program hosted by Natasha Del Toro that premiered on July 17, 2018 on Facebook Watch. The show is broadcast on Tuesdays and Thursdays at 8:00 PM ET.

== Format ==
Mic Dispatch reveals "the world as we see it: complicated, diverse and full of potential. Mic correspondents on this new, twice-weekly show go beyond the headlines to profile the underrepresented, the problem-solvers and the provocateurs."

== Production ==
On February 12, 2018, it was announced that Facebook was developing a news section within its streaming service Facebook Watch to feature breaking news stories. The news section was set to be overseen by Facebook's head of news partnerships Campbell Brown.

On June 6, 2018, it was announced that Facebook's first slate of partners for their news section on Facebook Watch would include Mic. The news program the two companies developed was revealed to be titled Mic Dispatch.

On July 9, 2018, it was reported that the series would be hosted by Natasha Del Toro, a reporter and producer of investigative documentaries for Fusion since 2013. Correspondents for the series were set to include Mic senior writer Aaron Morrison focusing on social and criminal justice movements, Mic co-founder Jake Horowitz, focusing on newsmaker interviews, and Mic senior style editor Evan Ross Katz focusing on fashion and the changing LGBTQ landscape. Episodes of the show were expected to feature two stories each and run around 15 minutes in length.
