= Fox News Update =

American television news program on Fox News Channel

- Presented by: Shepard Smith; Carley Shimkus; Ed Henry
- Country of origin: United States
- Original language: English
- No. of seasons: 1
- No. of episodes: 311

Production
- Running time: 3–13 minutes

Original release
- Network: Facebook Watch
- Release: July 16, 2018 – January 14, 2019

Fox News Update is an American news program hosted by Shepard Smith, Carley Shimkus, and Ed Henry that premiered on July 16, 2018 on Facebook Watch. The show is broadcast daily at 6:00 AM and weekdays at 4:00 PM ET. Smith reports during weekday afternoons, Shimkus during weekday mornings, and Henry on weekend mornings.

== Premise ==
The show focuses on "up-to-the minute breaking news and the most compelling stories of the day."

== Production ==
On February 12, 2018, it was announced that Facebook was developing a news section within its streaming service Facebook Watch to feature breaking news stories. The news section was set to be overseen by Facebook's head of news partnerships Campbell Brown.

On June 6, 2018, it was announced that Facebook's first slate of partners for their news section on Facebook Watch would include Fox News. The news program the two companies developed was revealed to be hosted by Shepard Smith, Carley Shimkus, and Abby Huntsman and titled Fox News Update.

On July 13, 2018, it was announced that the show would premiere on July 16, 2018 and broadcast on weekdays at 6:00 AM ET on weekday and weekend mornings and 4:00 PM on weekday afternoons.

== Reception ==
The Verge's Patricia Hernandez noted the frequency in which episodes of the series were set to stream ahead of its premiere and interpreted this as an attempt by Facebook to appease Republican politicians who had questioned the company's executives over an alleged liberal bias.
