= Anderson Cooper Full Circle =

- Cropped title screen from the Facebook Watch era
- Presented by: Anderson Cooper
- Country of origin: United States
- Original language: English
- No. of seasons: 1
- No. of episodes: 133

Production
- Running time: 7–26 minutes

Original release
- Network: Facebook Watch (2018–2019); CNN Digital (2019–2020); CNN+ (2022)
- Release: July 16, 2018 – April 28, 2022

Anderson Cooper Full Circle is an American news program hosted by Anderson Cooper that premiered on July 16, 2018, on Facebook Watch, moving to CNN digital platforms and airing there until 2020. On March 29, 2022, the series resumed on CNN+ and concluded with the service's closure.

== Format ==
On Facebook, the show was broadcast in a vertical format optimal for mobile devices and filmed from wherever Cooper is for Anderson Cooper 360. The show includes live polls that offer the ability for to vote on which stories they care about the most. Cooper also replies to questions posed by the audience on the show's Facebook comments section.

== Production ==
On February 12, 2018, it was announced that Facebook was developing a news section within its streaming service Facebook Watch to feature breaking news stories. The news section was set to be overseen by Facebook's head of news partnerships Campbell Brown.

On June 6, 2018, it was announced that Facebook's first slate of partners for their news section on Facebook Watch would include CNN. The news program the two companies developed was revealed to be hosted by Anderson Cooper and titled Anderson Cooper Full Circle.

On July 11, 2018, it was announced that the show would premiere on July 16, 2018 and broadcast on weekdays at 6:25 PM ET. It was further reported that the show's first episode was scheduled to be broadcast from Helsinki, Finland for the 2018 Russia–United States Summit between U.S. President Donald Trump and Russian President Vladimir Putin.

In July 2019, Cooper noted at the end of the 261st broadcast on Facebook that the show would be leaving the platform. The show returned in October 2019 with live broadcasts on CNN's website and its app. The show began broadcasting live features again on its Facebook page in April 2020. However, these are supplements to the main series often featuring CNN's Chief Medical Correspondent Dr. Sanjay Gupta.

In December 2021, it was announced that the show would be moving to CNN's streaming service, CNN+, with new episodes available at its March 29 launch, and further released Tuesdays and Saturdays. It was at this point that the Facebook page ceased updating. On April 21, CNN+ was announced to be shutting down, and no further episodes would end up being released before the shutdown occurred on April 28.

== Reception ==
Following the show's premiere, BGR's Andy Meek spoke positively of the production values of the show but was skeptical about its potential success given its distribution via Facebook Watch saying, "It was everything you'd expect from Anderson's network, and the show had top-quality production values. What's not yet clear, of course, is how much of a success it will ultimately enjoy, given that it's being hosted on the Facebook Watch platform — part of a major investment in news programming from Facebook."
