= Megan Hine =

- Born: Megan Hine
- Occupations: Adventurer; Author; Survival consultant; TV safety consultant; Television presenter
- Website: meganhine.com

Megan Hine is a British survival consultant, adventurer, television presenter and writer. She is known for her work alongside Bear Grylls on Mission Survive (2015, 2016), Car Vs Wild (2013) and Bear Grylls: Breaking Point (2015). She has also worked on a number of other television shows. She is an expedition guide and one of Bear Grylls' survival consultants.

== Credits ==
=== Presenting ===
- The Curse of the Lost Amazon Gold
- Bear Grylls: Mission Survive Series 1 (2015) (6 part)
- Bear Grylls: Mission Survive Series 2 (2016) (6 part)
- The Homerun – Survival Expert (2012)
- Weather Terror (2015)
- I Shouldn’t Be Alive Climbing and falling stunt double
- Car Vs Wild 4x4 stunt driver
- Jungle Expedition 4x4 stunt driver
- Namibia Expedition 4x4 stunt driver

=== Behind the scenes ===
- Running Wild: Bear Grylls (2015–2016) (5 part) – Safety/Survival Consultant/Journey Producer
- Bear Grylls: Mission Survi (2015–2016) (12 part) – Safety/survival consultant
- Bear Grylls: Breaking Point (2015) (6 part) – Safety/Survival consultant
- Car Vs Wild (2013–2014) (10 part) – Safety/Survival consultant/Stunt driver
- I Shouldn't be Alive (2011) (1 part) – Climbing expert/Safety/survival consultant
- Man Vs Wild (2010–2011) (2 part) – Rope Safety consultant

== Books ==
- Mind of a Survivor, published in 2017
