= Undivided ATTN: =

- Cropped title screen from the show, which is broadcast in a vertical format
- Presented by: Hannah Stocking; Juanpa Zurita; Trae Crowder; Lele Pons
- Country of origin: United States
- Original language: English
- No. of seasons: 1
- No. of episodes: 25

Production
- Running time: 2–5 minutes
- Production company: ATTN:

Original release
- Network: Facebook Watch
- Release: July 18, 2018 – January 12, 2019

Undivided ATTN: is an American news program hosted by Hannah Stocking, Juanpa Zurita, Trae Crowder, and Lele Pons that premiered on July 18, 2018 on Facebook Watch. The show was broadcast on Wednesdays at 9 PM ET.

== Format ==
Undivided ATTN: is described as an "explainer show that breaks down the biggest issue of the week. In 3-5 minute episodes hosted by a rotating cast of social influencers, Undivided ATTN: will provide context on the stories everybody’s talking about."

== Production ==
On February 12, 2018, it was announced that Facebook was developing a news section within its streaming service Facebook Watch to feature breaking news stories. The news section was set to be overseen by Facebook's head of news partnerships Campbell Brown.

On June 6, 2018, it was announced that Facebook's first slate of partners for their news section on Facebook Watch would include ATTN:. The news program the two companies developed was revealed to be titled Undivided ATTN:.

On June 15, 2018, it was announced that the show would premiere in July 2018 and be hosted by YouTube personality Hannah Stocking, vlogger Juanpa Zurita, comedian Trae Crowder, and internet personality Lele Pons.
