= Turnt =

- Genre: Teen drama
- Created by: Rachel Stern
- Written by: Rachel Stern
- Directed by: Will Slocombe
- Starring: Madeleine Byrne; Jared Scott; Elsie Hewitt; Cristian Oliveras; Darren Barnet; Isabella Roland; Donald Clark
- Country of origin: United States
- Original language: English
- No. of seasons: 1
- No. of episodes: 40

Production
- Executive producer: Emily Brecht
- Running time: 7–18 minutes
- Production companies: Brat; One Push Digital Creative

Original release
- Network: Facebook Watch
- Release: August 1 – August 24, 2018

Turnt is an American teen drama web series created by Rachel Stern that premiered on August 1, 2018 on Facebook Watch.

== Premise ==
Turnt follows "an ensemble cast of characters as they navigate high school."

== Cast and characters ==
- Madeleine Byrne as Kat
- Jared Scott as Forrest
- Elsie Hewitt as Victoria
- Cristian Oliveras as Danny
- Darren Barnet as Hot Seth
- Isabella Roland as Jess
- Donald Clark as Gabe
- Reece Everett Ryan as Ben

== Episodes ==
No.	Title	Original release date
1	"Homewrecker"	August 1, 2018
2	"Shirt. Shoes. Service."	August 1, 2018
3	"Moving On Already"	August 1, 2018
4	"It's Complicated"	August 1, 2018
5	"Love-Love"	August 8, 2018
6	"Really Good Friends"	August 8, 2018
7	"Detention"	August 8, 2018
8	"Movie Night"	August 15, 2018
9	"All You Need Is A Net"	August 15, 2018
10	"Training Day"	August 15, 2018
11	"Girls' Night"	August 22, 2018
12	"Partners"	August 22, 2018
13	"Flying Squirrel Technique"	August 22, 2018
14	"Surprise!"	August 29, 2018
15	"Love Magic"	August 29, 2018
16	"The Ben Issue"	August 29, 2018
17	"CopyKat"	September 5, 2018
18	"In Your Head"	September 5, 2018
19	"Cry for Help"	September 5, 2018
20	"A Little Sick"	September 12, 2018
21	"Broken Hearts"	September 12, 2018
22	"Thirsty"	September 12, 2018
23	"Peter's Here"	September 19, 2018
24	"Bad Boy"	September 19, 2018
25	"Rumor Mill"	September 19, 2018
26	"Lying Liar"	September 26, 2018
27	"Visitors Only"	September 26, 2018
28	"Stolen Kisses"	September 26, 2018
29	"The Lock In"	October 3, 2018
30	"The Lock Out"	October 3, 2018
31	"Bygones Go Bye-Bye"	October 3, 2018
32	"Sherlock Forrest"	October 10, 2018
33	"Lonely Together"	October 10, 2018
34	"Boy Bye"	October 10, 2018
35	"The Cure for Sadness"	October 17, 2018
36	"This Is Not a Drill"	October 17, 2018
37	"Self-Restraint"	October 17, 2018
38	"Playing to Win"	October 24, 2018
39	"Game Over"	October 24, 2018
40	"Happy Birthday"	October 24, 2018

== Production ==
=== Development ===
On August 21, 2017, it was announced that digital production company Brat was developing a new series, entitled Turnt, to be written by Rachel Stern and directed by Will Slocombe. Brat was set to collaborate with talent manager Matt Dugan and digital production company One Push Digital Creative on the series. The series was expected to take place in the fictional "Attaway High" universe where several series produced by Brat would be set in the same high school, exist in the same fictional universe, and feature characters that appear across multiple series. On July 20, 2018, it was reported that Brat had sold the series to Facebook, making Turnt one of a small handful of series that Brat was producing in order to sell to other platforms. A week later, it was announced that the series would premiere on August 1, 2018 with the release of the first four episodes. The series is expected to release three episodes per week for every week thereafter.

=== Casting ===
Alongside the initial series announcement, it was confirmed that Madeleine Byrne, Cristian Oliveras, Elsie Hewitt, and Nate Wyatt would star in the series.

=== Filming ===
Principal photography for the series took place in Pasadena, California at a nearby high school which was also used for filming of the other "Attaway High" series.
