= Quartz News =

- Presented by: Preeti Varathan
- Country of origin: United States
- Original language: English
- No. of seasons: 1
- No. of episodes: 47

Production
- Executive producer: Solana Pyne
- Producer: Preeti Varathan
- Running time: 5–10 minutes

Original release
- Network: Facebook Watch
- Release: July 19, 2018 – June 13, 2019

Quartz News is an American news program from Quartz hosted by Preeti Varathan that premiered on July 19, 2018 on Facebook Watch. The show is broadcast on Thursdays at 12 PM ET.

== Format ==
Quartz News features "in-depth reporting from around the world. Each episode investigates a story that’s driving the global conversation. Beyond the show itself, Quartz News will cultivate its community through a companion Messenger bot experience that will give followers the opportunity to interact with the show."

== Production ==
On February 12, 2018, it was announced that Facebook was developing a news section within its streaming service Facebook Watch to feature breaking news stories. The news section was set to be overseen by Facebook's head of news partnerships Campbell Brown.

On June 6, 2018, it was announced that Facebook's first slate of partners for their news section on Facebook Watch would include Quartz. The news program the two companies developed was revealed to be titled Quartz News.

On June 12, 2018, it was announced that Preeti Varathan, an economics and finance reporter in New York, would be a reporter on the show. The show was expected to utilize journalism from Quartz news bureaus around the world in Asia, Africa, India, Europe and the Americas.
