= 2018 in South Korean television =

This is a non-comprehensive list of Television in South Korea related events from 2018.

== Channels ==
Launches:

- January 1 - EBS Kids
- April 21 - JTBC4

== Ongoing ==
Title	Channel/Platform	First Aired	Source
The Haunted House	Tooniverse	July 20	

== New Series & Returning Shows ==
=== Drama ===
Title	Channel/Platform	First Aired	Finale	Status	Source
Cross	tvN	January 29	March 20	Ended	
1 Percent of Friendship	KBS2	February 3	June 9	Ended	
About Time	tvN	July 10	May 21	Ended	
Are You Human?	KBS2	June 4	August 7	Ended	

=== Animation ===
Title	Channel/Platform	First Aired	Finale	Status	Source
The Haunted House: Birth of the Ghost Ball X Second Story	Tooniverse	November 8	January 24	Ended	

== Ending ==
=== Drama ===
End date	Title	Channel/Platform	First Aired	Source
March 20	Cross	tvN	January 29	
June 9	1 Percent of Friendship	KBS2	March 3	
July 10	About Time	tvN	May 21	
August 7	Are You Human?	KBS2	June 4	

=== Animation ===
End date	Title	Channel/Platform	First Aired	Source
March 15	The Haunted House: Birth of the Ghost Ball X	Tooniverse	November 9, 2017	
