= After After Party =

2018 American TV talk show

- Genre: Late-night talk show
- Created by: Julie Miller
- Presented by: Sonia Denis
- Starring: Conor Delehanty
- Composer: Jean Grae
- Country of origin: United States
- Original language: English
- No. of seasons: 1
- No. of episodes: 30

Production
- Executive producers: Julie Miller; Sonia Denis; Shannon Gibson; Amy Emmerich; Stone Roberts
- Running time: 11–15 minutes
- Production company: Refinery29

Original release
- Network: Facebook Watch
- Release: August 13 – September 21, 2018

After After Party is an American late-night talk show hosted by comedian Sonia Denis that premiered on August 13, 2018, on Facebook Watch. Episodes air on weekdays, five nights per week, at 9:00 PM EST and feature a panel of guests alongside sketches featuring Denis and the show's writing staff.

== Premise ==
After After Party tackles "pop culture, politics and social issues alongside comedians, journalists and celebrity guests." Each episode blends "comedy, conversation, and context through a variety of creative formats, including: sketch & panel comedy with a rotating variety of personalities; wild card games & confessionals; surprise guest drop ins; and the “NTK” or “Need To Know,” the nightly last word of fun and serviceable advice."

== Production ==
On August 8, 2018, it was announced that Facebook had given the production a series order for a first season consisting of thirty episodes. The series was created by Julie Miller and set to be hosted by comedian Sonia Denis. Miller was also slated to serve as an executive producer. Production companies involved with the series were expected to include Refinery29.

Each week's episodes are filmed twice a week on Mondays and Wednesdays, with shoots lasting between an hour to an hour and a half. Subjects chosen for discussion are meant to be topical but not too specific as episodes are not shot and released same day. Refinery29 generally sends material to Facebook for notes including a rundown of topics ahead of taping, scripts, and final edits.

== Episodes ==
No.	Title	Featured guest	Panel	Original release date
1	"Why Are We Obsessed With Beyoncé & Jay-Z's Marriage?"	N/A	Jerah Milligan, Elisa Kreisinger, & Bowen Yang	August 13, 2018
2	"Cultural Appreciation Vs. Appropriation In Hip-Hop"	N/A	Brian Peck, Rebecca O'Neal, & Anna Suzuki	August 14, 2018
3	"The United States Of Medical Marijuana"	N/A	Luke Mones, Rebecca O'Neal, & Janelle James	August 15, 2018
4	"Regina Hall Is Competitive AF"	Regina Hall	Janelle James, Diego Lopez, & Mina Kimes	August 16, 2018
5	"Is Omarosa Good Or Bad For The Culture?"	N/A	Caroline Sinders, Matt Rogers, & Marcia Belsky	August 17, 2018
6	"How Do You Define Toxic Masculinity?"	Tierra Whack	Liza Treyger, Bowen Yang, & Jerah Milligan	August 20, 2018
7	"Is The Stigma On Body Hair Changing?"	N/A	Liza Treyger, Saurin Choksi, & Joyelle Nicole Johnson	August 21, 2018
8	"Why People Are Having Less Sex Than Ever"	N/A	Rebecca O’Neal, Matt Rogers, & Brendan Eyre	August 22, 2018
9	"Should We Feel Guilty About Self-Care?"	N/A	Catherine Cohen, Brian Park, & Brittany Luse	August 23, 2018
10	"What's Digital Blackface — & Are You Doing It?"	N/A	Dylan Marron, Mamoudou N'Diaye, & Rebecca V. O'Neal	August 24, 2018
11	"These Public Apologies Are Hard To Believe"	N/A	Carri Twigg, Bowen Yang, & Brendan Eyre	August 27, 2018
12	"Is Your Body Type Trending In The Media?"	N/A	Rebecca V. O'Neal, Dylan Marron, & Catherine Cohen	August 28, 2018
13	"Should We Change The Voting Age?"	Gina Yashere	Calvin Evans, Carri Twigg, & Mamoudou N'Diaye	August 29, 2018
14	"Why America Loves True Crime"	Amanda Hess	Rebecca V. O'Neal, Matt Rogers, & Taylor Ortega	August 30, 2018
15	"Who Has The Power In Your Relationship?"	N/A	Mike Lebovitz, Elisa Kreisinger, & Janelle James	August 31, 2018
16	"Sasheer Zamata Ranks Her Favorite Federal Holidays"	Sasheer Zamata	Mamoudou N’diaye, Luke Mones, & Anna Suzuki	September 3, 2018
17	"The Politics Of Code-Switching"	N/A	Mamoudou N’diaye, Dylan Marron, & Joyelle Nicole Johnson	September 4, 2018
18	"Will Sex Bots Replace Humans?"	Dr. Zhana Vrangalova	Shalewa Sharpe, Liza Treyger, & Saurin Choski	September 5, 2018
19	"Ariana Grande & Dress Code Controversies"	N/A	Catherine Cohen, Diego Lopez, & Rebecca O'Neal	September 6, 2018
20	"Playing This Icon Is Regina King's Dream Role"	Regina King	Matt Rogers, Bowen Yang, & Rebecca O'Neal	September 7, 2018
21	"Has Online Dating Changed The Game?"	N/A	Will Miles, Bowen Yang, & Rebecca O'Neal	September 10, 2018
22	"What Impostor Syndrome Feels Like"	Dr. Dena Simmons	Catherine Cohen, Diego Lopez, & Rebecca O'Neal	September 11, 2018
23	"An Inside Look Into Fandoms"	N/A	Justin Tyler, Rebecca O'Neal, & Matteo Lane	September 12, 2018
24	"Can You Identify These Celebrity Tattoos?"	N/A	Liza Treyger, Diego Lopez, & Joyelle Nicole Johnson	September 13, 2018
25	"The Wildest Moments Of 2018 So Far"	Yrsa Daley-Ward	Matt Rogers, Carri Twigg, & Luke Mones	September 14, 2018
26	"Dating Advice From La La Anthony"	La La Anthony	Bowen Yang, Rebecca O'Neal, & Matt Rogers	September 17, 2018
27	"What's Behind Our Fascination With Scammers?"	Leah Carroll	Dylan Marron, Rebecca O'Neal, & Jo Firestone	September 18, 2018
28	"Santigold On Balancing Motherhood & Music"	Santigold	Eudora Peterson, Joyelle Johnson, & Elisa Kreisinger	September 19, 2018
29	"What's Up With All The Reboots In Hollywood?"	N/A	Matt Rogers, Taylor Ortega, & Bowen Yang	September 20, 2018
30	"Play "Would You Rather" With These 2018 Situations"	N/A	Rebecca O'Neal, Matt Rogers, & Carri Twigg	September 21, 2018
