= Chasing Corruption =

2018 American TV news program

- Presented by: Ian Hoppe
- Country of origin: United States
- Original language: English
- No. of seasons: 1
- No. of episodes: 14

Production
- Executive producer: Marsha Oglesby
- Running time: 7–10 minutes

Original release
- Network: Facebook Watch
- Release: September 18, 2018 – June 4, 2019

Chasing Corruption is an American streaming television news program hosted by Ian Hoppe that premiered on September 18, 2018, on Facebook Watch.

== Format ==
Chasing Corruption follows "host Ian Hoppe and the Reckon by AL.com team as they travel across the USA to meet some of America's toughest watchdog journalists — and the stories of conspiracy, bribery, fraud and more they've uncovered."

== Production ==
On February 12, 2018, it was announced that Facebook was developing a news section within its streaming service Facebook Watch to feature breaking news stories. The news section was set to be overseen by Facebook's head of news partnerships Campbell Brown.

On June 6, 2018, it was announced that Facebook's first slate of partners for their news section on Facebook Watch would include Advance Local's Reckon by AL.com. The news program the two companies developed was revealed to be hosted by Ian Hoppe, titled Chasing Corruption. Additionally, Hoppe was expected to work with Alabama Media Group's Amy Yurkanin, John Hammontree, and Ginnard Archibald to create the series, under the leadership of the company's director of video, Justin Yurkanin, and in collaboration with film producer Marsha Oglesby.
