= 2017 in South Korean television =

This is a non-comprehensive list of Television in South Korea related events from 2017.

== Channels ==
Launches:

- September 22 -
  - History
  - Lifetime

== Ongoing ==
Title	Channel/Platform	First Aired	Source
The Haunted House	Tooniverse	July 20	

== New Series & Returning Shows ==
=== Drama ===
Title	Channel/Platform	First Aired	Finale	Status	Source
The Package	JTBC	October 13	November 18	Ended	
Andante	KBS1	September 24	January 7	Ended	
Argon	tvN	September 4	October 26	Ended	
Avengers Social Club	tvN	October 11	November 16	Ended	
Criminal Minds	tvN	July 26	September 28	Ended	

=== Animation ===
Title	Channel/Platform	First Aired	Finale	Status	Source
The Haunted House: Birth of the Ghost Ball X	Tooniverse	November 9	March 15	Ended	

== Ending ==
=== Drama ===
End date	Title	Channel/Platform	First Aired	Source
November 18	The Package	JTBC	October 13	
September 23	Father, I'll Take Care of You	MBC TV	November 12, 2016	
September 28	Criminal Minds	JTBC	July 26	

=== Animation ===
End date	Title	Channel/Platform	First Aired	Source
January 18	The Haunted House: The Secret of The Ghost Ball	Tooniverse	July 20, 2016	
