= Real America with Jorge Ramos =

- Presented by: Jorge Ramos
- Country of origin: United States
- Original language: English
- No. of seasons: 1
- No. of episodes: 19

Production
- Running time: 5–20 minutes
- Production company: Noticias Univision

Original release
- Network: Facebook Watch
- Release: September 6, 2018 – May 23, 2019

Real America with Jorge Ramos is an American news program hosted by Jorge Ramos that premiered on Univision on November 21, 2017.

It later had a premiere on Facebook Watch on September 6, 2018.

== Format ==
Real America with Jorge Ramos follows Ramos as he "travels the country to talk to immigrants of diverse backgrounds and situations, delivering a rarely covered view of today’s America from their perspective."

== Production ==
On February 12, 2018, it was announced that Facebook was developing a news section within its streaming service Facebook Watch to feature breaking news stories. The news section was set to be overseen by Facebook's head of news partnerships Campbell Brown.

On June 6, 2018, it was announced that Facebook's first slate of partners for their news section on Facebook Watch would include Univision. The news program the two companies developed was revealed to be hosted by Jorge Ramos and titled Real America with Jorge Ramos.

As of 2022, the last episodes aired in 2021 on Univision.
