= Profile (2018 TV series) =

- Also known as: Profile by BuzzFeed News
- Genre: Talk show
- Presented by: Audie Cornish
- Country of origin: United States
- Original language: English
- No. of seasons: 1
- No. of episodes: 62

Production
- Executive producers: Tracey Eyers; Shani Hilton; Cindy Vanegas-Gesuale
- Running time: 16–40 minutes
- Production company: BuzzFeed News

Original release
- Network: Facebook Watch
- Release: July 22, 2018 – January 16, 2019

Profile is an American talk show hosted by Audie Cornish that premiered on July 22, 2018, on Facebook Watch.

== Premise ==
Each episode of Profile featured "a different newsmaker each week, giving viewers a chance to hear from the biggest names in politics, tech, business, and entertainment."

== Production ==
On July 10, 2018, it was announced that Facebook, through the news division of Facebook Watch, had partnered with BuzzFeed News on a weekly interview series titled Profile. The series was set to be hosted by Audie Cornish and executive produced by Tracey Eyers, BuzzFeed News vice-president of news and programming Shani Hilton, and BuzzFeed News head of programming Cindy Vanegas-Gesuale. In August 2019, Axios reported that Profile had completed its one-year run and would not be renewed.

== Episodes ==
No.	Title	Featured guest	Original release date
1	"Jonathan Van Ness Will Take It There, Hunny"	Jonathan Van Ness	July 22, 2018
2	"Terence Nance Isn’t Worried About What White People Think"	Terence Nance	July 29, 2018
3	"Jane Seymour Has "No Idea" Why CBS Won't Reboot Dr. Quinn"	Jane Seymour	August 5, 2018
4	"Tom Steyer Is Not Kidding About Impeaching Trump"	Tom Steyer	August 12, 2018
5	"Chelsea Handler Has A Very Specific Trump Fantasy"	Chelsea Handler	August 19, 2018
6	"Bobby Brown Has His Own Story To Tell"	Bobby Brown	August 26, 2018
7	"Drew Dixon Is Speaking Out About Russell Simmons"	Drew Dixon	September 2, 2018
8	"Drew Michael Doesn’t Regret His Controversial Comedy"	Drew Michael	September 9, 2018
9	"Lucy McBath Wants To Bring Her Activism To Congress"	Lucy McBath	September 16, 2018
10	"Alisyn Camerota Is Sticking To "Old-Fashioned Facts," Not New Alternatives"	Alisyn Camerota	September 23, 2018
11	"Estonia's First Female President Was Mistaken For A Translator"	Kersti Kaljulaid	September 30, 2018
12	"Rep. Joe Crowley Says Women Of Color Make Democrats Stronger"	Joe Crowley	October 7, 2018
13	"Christine Hallquist Wants Voters To See More Than Gender"	Christine Hallquist	October 14, 2018
14	"D.L. Hughley Says 2018 Is The "Year Of The White Victim""	D. L. Hughley	October 21, 2018
15	"Janelle Monáe’s Story Will Not Be Erased"	Janelle Monáe	October 23, 2018
16	"Charlamagne Tha God Thinks Men Should Be More Vulnerable"	Charlamagne Tha God	October 26, 2018
17	"That Time Michael Shannon Was On A Plane With Steve Bannon"	Michael Shannon	November 4, 2018
18	"Rosamund Pike’s Roles Honor Complex Women"	Rosamund Pike	November 10, 2018
19	"Steve McQueen Wants More Diverse Critics"	Steve McQueen	November 11, 2018
20	"Anthony Scaramucci Has No Regrets About His Time In The White House"	Anthony Scaramucci	November 18, 2018
21	"Christmas At Stanley Tucci’s House Is Next Level"	Stanley Tucci	November 25, 2018
22	"Why Regina King Likes To See People Get Uncomfortable"	Regina King	December 2, 2018
23	"Tyra Banks Wants To See Another Black Supermodel"	Tyra Banks	December 9, 2018
24	"Ken Jeong: "Crazy Rich Asians" Was Bigger Than All Of Us"	Ken Jeong	December 16, 2018
25	"Leah Remini Won’t Back Down On Scientology"	Leah Remini	December 23, 2018
26	"Why Padma Lakshmi Won’t Stay Silent"	Padma Lakshmi	December 30, 2018
27	"Colin Quinn Thinks "It's Ridiculous" Comedy Is Being Criticized"	Colin Quinn	January 6, 2019
28	"Michelle Yeoh Belongs In The Spotlight And She Knows It"	Michelle Yeoh	January 10, 2019
29	"Anthony Rapp Took On Kevin Spacey. Now, He's Facing The Trolls."	Anthony Rapp	January 16, 2019
30	"Amanda Seales Is Not Here For R. Kelly Supporters"	Amanda Seales	January 25, 2019
31	"Chris Christie: Trump Should Worry About Biden, Booker And Harris"	Chris Christie	February 2, 2019
32	"Serena Williams Talks Fighting Misogyny And Qai Qai’s New Bad Habit"	Serena Williams	February 4, 2019
33	"TV Host Mike Rowe Says America Made Work The Enemy"	Mike Rowe	February 10, 2019
34	"WWE Star Paige Reveals How The Rock Changed Her Life"	Paige	February 13, 2019
35	"Bumble’s CEO Wants To Fight Sexism With Her App"	Whitney Wolfe Herd	February 17, 2019
36	"Chandra Wilson Is Making History With “Grey’s Anatomy”"	Chandra Wilson	February 24, 2019
37	"What Tyler Perry Wants You To Know About Madea"	Tyler Perry	February 27, 2019
38	"Why Lindsey Vonn Won’t Call Herself The G.O.A.T"	Lindsey Vonn	February 28, 2019
