= Big Chicken Shaq =

- Genre: Reality
- Starring: Shaquille O'Neal
- Country of origin: United States
- Original language: English
- No. of seasons: 1
- No. of episodes: 8

Production
- Executive producers: Steven Michaels; Jonathan Koch; Shaquille O'Neal; Ryann Lauckner; James Macnab; Mark Efman; Perry Rogers; Colin Smeeton; Mike Parris; James Greco
- Producers: Shanae Humphrey; Willis Davidson
- Cinematography: Safa Ansarifar
- Editors: Michael Griffin; David Brown
- Running time: 12–20 minutes
- Production company: Asylum Entertainment

Original release
- Network: Facebook Watch
- Release: October 6 – November 24, 2018

Big Chicken Shaq is an American reality series that premiered on October 6, 2018, on Facebook Watch.

== Premise ==
Big Chicken Shaq follows Shaquille O'Neal's "journey as he angles to balance his already busy life with the restaurant ["Big Chicken" in Las Vegas, NV] – determined to maintain his singular humor in the process."

== Production ==
On July 25, 2018, it was announced that Facebook had given the production a series order for a first season consisting of eight episodes. Executive producers were set to include Steven Michaels, Jonathan Koch, Ryann Lauckner, James Macnab, Mark Efman, Shaquille O'Neal, Perry Rogers, Colin Smeeton, and Mike Parris. Production companies involved in the series were slated to consist of Asylum Entertainment. On September 27, 2018, it was reported that the series would premiere its first two episodes on October 6, 2018.

== Episodes ==
No.	Title	Original release date
1	"Shaq's Got Some BIG News!"	October 6, 2018
2	"Hot Shaq In Nashville"	October 6, 2018
3	"Mama Shaq Comes To Town"	October 13, 2018
4	"When The Shaq's Away"	October 18, 2018
5	"Shaq Is Business Trippin"	November 1, 2018
6	"Undercover Shaq"	November 10, 2018
7	"It's Game Time With Shaq"	November 17, 2018
8	"Shaqs Chicken Empire Is Alive!"	November 24, 2018

== See also ==
- List of original programs distributed by Facebook Watch
