= Facebook Watch =

Facebook's video-on-demand service

- Website type: Video on demand
- Available in: English
- Headquarters: Menlo Park, California, {{{location_country}}}
- Area served: Worldwide
- Key people: Ricky Van Veen (Head of Global Creative Strategy); Mina Lefevre (Head of Development)
- Industry: Internet
- Parent: Meta Platforms
- Website: facebook.com/watch (Now redirect to reels)
- Commercial: Yes
- Launched: August 10, 2017; 9 years ago
- Current status: Closed since 26 April 2023; 3 years ago

Facebook Watch was a video on demand service operated by American company Meta Platforms (previously named Facebook, Inc.). The company announced the service in August 2017 and it was available to all U.S. users that month.

Facebook Watch offered tailored video recommendations and organizes content into categories based on metrics like popularity and user engagement. The platform hosted both short and long-form entertainment. Facebook Watch's original video content was produced for the company by others, who earned 55% of advertising revenue (Facebook kept the other 45%). In 2018, Facebook allocated a $1 billion budget for content creation. The company generates revenue from mid-roll ads and also explored the introduction of pre-roll ads in the same year. In August 2018, Facebook Watch became globally accessible to all Facebook users.

As of September 2020, Facebook reported that Facebook Watch had more than 1.25 billion monthly visitors, 46% of its monthly active user base at that time.

In April 2023, the service was discontinued.

== History ==
On August 9, 2017, Facebook, Inc. announced that it would be launching its own video on demand service. During the same announcement it was stated that the new service would be called Facebook Watch. The video on demand service was launched for a small group of U.S. users a day later, with a rollout to all U.S. users beginning at the end of August.

In May and June 2018, Facebook launched around six news programs from partners including BuzzFeed, Vox, CNN, and Fox News. These programs, developed by Facebook's head of news partnerships Campbell Brown, reportedly had an overall budget of US$90 million.

On July 25, 2018, Facebook gave their first presentation ever at the annual Television Critics Association's annual summer press tour. During Facebook's allotted time, Fidji Simo, the Vice President of Product for Video, and Ricky Van Veen, the Head of Global Creative Strategy, showcased Facebook's continuing ramp-up of original programming on Facebook Watch. On August 30, 2018, Facebook Watch became available internationally to all users of the social network worldwide.

In 2022, the TV apps for Facebook Watch were discontinued. In April 2023, Meta shut down its group responsible for original programming on Facebook Watch, and announced that none of the original shows on Facebook Watch would return for new seasons.

As of 2025, the Facebook Watch website was no longer available, redirecting to Facebook Reels.

== Budgets and monetization ==
=== Content budgets ===
For short-form videos, Facebook originally had a budget of roughly $10,000-$40,000 per episode, though renewal contracts have placed the budget in the $50,000-$70,000 range. Long-form TV-length series have budgets between $250,000 to over $1 million. The Wall Street Journal reported in September 2017 that the company was willing to spend up to $1 billion on original video content through 2018.

=== Monetization ===
Facebook keeps 45% of ad-break revenue for content shown on Facebook Watch, while its content-producing partners receive 55% of ad revenue. In January 2017, the company announced that it would be adding "mid-roll" advertising to its videos, in which ads will appear in videos after users have watched at least 20 seconds. In December 2017, Ad Age reported that Facebook was lifting a long-time ban on "pre-roll" ads, an advertising format that shows promotional content before users start the actual video. Facebook had resisted using pre-roll ads because the format has a "reputation for annoying viewers" who want to get to the desired content, though the report stated that the company would nevertheless try the format.

Steve Ellis, CEO of WhoSay, a social influencer marketing company, told Ad Age that "YouTube already established that people will sit through and tolerate pre-roll" and that "It's proven that they haven't sent consumers fleeing, so it makes sense that Facebook would pursue a similar strategy as it builds out its original content experience". Two weeks after Ad Age's report, Facebook updated its blog to note that the pre-roll advertising format would begin testing in 2018, and that there were going to be changes to mid-roll ads; specifically, they cannot appear until a minute into a video, and are only available for videos that run for at least three minutes, as opposed to the original rule of appearing after 20 seconds on videos potentially as short as 90 seconds.

== Content ==
In addition to original programming, Facebook Watch also distributed content licensed from other companies. In November 2018, the streaming service struck a deal with 20th Century Fox Television to stream television series Buffy the Vampire Slayer, Angel, and Firefly. In 2024, they included a documentary film titled The Rise of Artist Dubose, a documentary about the life and career of American musician A Boogie wit da Hoodie.

== Reception ==
In 2017, Morgan Stanley analyst Brian Nowak estimated that "Facebook Watch" could bring in $565 million in revenue to Facebook by the end of 2018. In 2017, Jefferies analyst Brent Thill predicted that the service had the potential to earn $12 billion in revenue by 2022.

== See also ==
- Facebook Reels
