= Brown Eyed Girls discography =

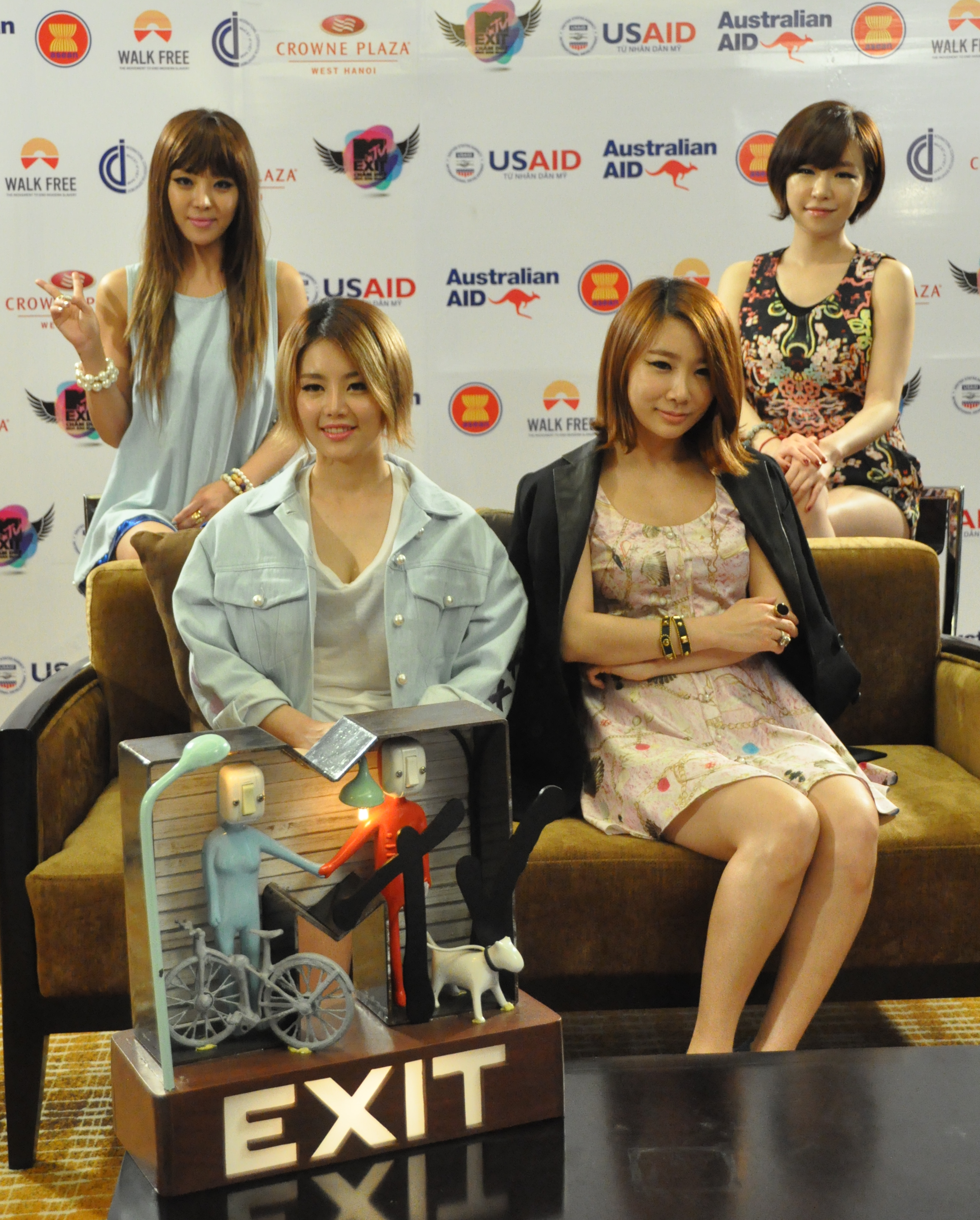
- Brown Eyed Girls in May 2012
- Studio albums: 7
- Extended plays: 3
- Compilation albums: 1
- Singles: 18

The discography of South Korean girl group Brown Eyed Girls consists of seven studio albums, three extended plays, one compilation album and eighteen singles.

== Albums ==
=== Studio albums ===
List of studio albums, with selected details, chart positions, and sales
Title	Details	Peak chart positions			Sales
Title	Details	KOR	JPN	US World	Sales
Your Story	Released: March 2, 2006; Re-released: August 25, 2006; Label: Nega Network; Format: CD, cassette, digital download	— (Note: Your Story peaked at number 38 on the MIAK monthly album chart for August 2006.)	—	—	KOR: 24,419
Leave Ms. Kim	Released: September 6, 2007; Label: Nega Network; Format: CD, digital download	— (Note: Leave Ms. Kim peaked at number 8 on the MIAK monthly album chart for September 2007.)	—	—	KOR: 10,438
Sound-G	Released: July 20, 2009; Re-released: November 2, 2009; Label: Nega Network, Sony Music Japan; Format: CD, digital download	—	54	—	
Sixth Sense	Released: September 23, 2011; Re-released: November 9, 2011; Label: Nega Network; Format: CD, digital download	2	—	—	KOR: 33,704
Black Box	Released: July 29, 2013; Label: Nega Network; Format: CD, digital download	5	—	—	KOR: 9,835
Basic	Released: November 5, 2015; Label: Mystic Entertainment; Format: CD, digital download	8	—	14	KOR: 4,968
"—" denotes releases that did not chart or were not released in that region.

=== Cover albums ===
List of studio albums, with selected details, chart positions, and sales
Title	Details	Peak chart positions	Sales
Title	Details	KOR	Sales
RE_vive	Released: October 28, 2019; Label: Mystic Story; Format: CD, digital download, streaming	24	KOR: 5,763

=== Compilation albums ===
List of compilation albums, with selected details, chart positions, and sales
Title	Details	Peak chart positions	Sales
Title	Details	KOR	Sales
Special Moments	Released: August 8, 2014; Label: Nega Network; Format: CD, digital download, streaming	5	KOR: 2,413

== Extended plays ==
List of extended plays, with selected details, chart positions, and sales
Title	Details	Peak chart positions	Sales
Title	Details	KOR	Sales
With L.O.V.E.	Released: January 17, 2008; Label: Nega Network; Format: CD, digital download, streaming	7	KOR: 9,058
My Style	Released: September 16, 2008; Label: Nega Network; Format: CD, digital download, streaming	8	KOR: 8,524
Festa On Ice 2010	Released: April 6, 2010; Label: Nega Network; Format: CD, digital download, streaming	—	
"—" denotes releases that did not chart or were not released in that region.

== Singles ==
Title	Year	Peak chart positions				Sales	Album
Title	Year	KOR	KOR Hot	JPN	US World	Sales	Album
Korean
"Come Closer" (다가와서)	2006	—	—	—	—	—N/a	Your Story
"Hold the Line" (feat. Cho PD)	2006	—	—	—	—	—N/a	Your Story
"Oasis" (오아시스) (feat. Lee Jae Hoon)	2007	—	—	—	—	—N/a	Leave, Ms. Kim
"Deceived by You" (너에게 속았다)	2007	—	—	—	—	—N/a	Leave, Ms. Kim
"L.O.V.E" (러브)	2008	—	—	—	—	—N/a	With L.O.V.E
"How Come" (어쩌다)	2008	—	—	—	—	—N/a	My Style
"My Style (Hidden Track)" (마이 스타일)	2008	95	—	—	—	—N/a	My Style
"Candy Man"	2009	—	—	—	—	—N/a	Sound-G
"Abracadabra" (아브라카다브라)	2009	—	—	—	—	—N/a	Sound-G
"Sign" (싸인)	2009	56	—	—	—	—N/a	Sound-G
"Magic" (주제곡)	2010	12	—	—	—	—N/a	Festa On Ice 2010
"Hot Shot" (핫샷)	2011	2	6	—	—	KOR: 1,662,032	Sixth Sense
"Sixth Sense" (식스 센스)	2011	1	2	—	18	KOR: 2,585,879	Sixth Sense
"Cleansing Cream" (클렌징크림)	2011	4	6	—	—	KOR: 1,643,177	Sixth Sense
"One Summer Night" (한 여름밤의 꿈)	2012	7	8	—	—	KOR: 1,157,848	Non-album single
"Recipe" (레시피)	2013	5	7	—	—	KOR: 511,360	Black Box
"Kill Bill" (킬빌)	2013	2	7	—	12	KOR: 1,125,798	Black Box
"Tonight" (M&N) (오늘밤)	2013	19	60	—	—	KOR: 100,301	Non-album single
"Brave New World" (신세계)	2015	10	—	—	—	KOR: 306,604	Basic
"Abandoned" (내가 날 버린 이유)	2019	139	—	—	—	—N/a	RE_vive
"Wonder Woman" (원더우먼)	2019	69	—	—	—	—N/a	RE_vive
"Snowman"	2020	—	—	—	—	—N/a	Non-album single
Japanese
"Sign"	2011	—	—	24	—	JPN: 4,259	Non-album single
"—" denotes releases that did not chart or were not released in that region.

== Other charted songs ==
Title	Year	Peak chart positions		Album
Title	Year	KOR	KOR Hot	Album
"Jump"	2010	76	—	Festa On Ice 2010
"Ugly Truth" (불편한 진실)	2011	13	23	Sixth Sense
"Vendetta"	2011	62	50	Sixth Sense
"Lovemotion"	2011	63	78	Sixth Sense
"La Boheme"	2011	74	—	Sixth Sense
"Countdown (Interlude)"	2011	148	—	Sixth Sense
"Swing It Shorty (Intro)"	2011	183	—	Sixth Sense
"Come With Me"	2012	40	57	The Original (Digital single)
"Before Sunset" (날아갈래)	2013	36	—	Black Box
"Good Fellas"	2013	61	—	Black Box
"After Club"	2013	87	—	Black Box
"Lie" (거짓말이야)	2013	89	—	Black Box
"Boy"	2013	100	—	Black Box
"Satisfaction"	2013	101	—	Black Box
"Mystery Survivor"	2013	106	—	Black Box
"Hush"	2014	42	—	Special Moments
"Warm Hole"	2015	60	—	Basic
"Time of Ice Cream"	2015	62	—	Basic
"Wave"	2015	100	—	Basic
"—" denotes releases that did not chart or were not released in that region.
