= With L.O.V.E. =

EP by Brown Eyed Girls
- Released: January 17, 2008
- Genre: K-pop; Electropop; Dance pop
- Length: 26:04
- Language: Korean
- Label: Nega Network

Brown Eyed Girls chronology
With L.O.V.E. (2008)	My Style (2008)

Singles from With L.O.V.E
- 1. "L.O.V.E" Released: January 17, 2008

With L.O.V.E. is the first extended play by South Korean girl group Brown Eyed Girls. The album was released on January 17, 2008, with the title track "L.O.V.E". With L.O.V.E. marked a significant switch in the group's music, as it is the first release that marks their official switch from their "hybrid soul" concept to a more electronic dance pop sound.

== Background ==
The title track for the mini album was originally supposed to be "Love Action" featuring Cho PD, a song written by famous composer Yoon Il-sang and a callback to their 2007 hit song "Hold The Line" with the rapper. The title track was later changed to be the electropop track "L.O.V.E" written by saintbinary, Lee Min-soo, and Kim Eana because of its exciting combination with the group's voice. The last song included, "Breakup Letter", was scheduled to be included in the second album Leave Ms. Kim, but was omitted and later included in With L.O.V.E.

== Release and promotion ==
With L.O.V.E was officially released on January 17, 2008, under Nega Network with the title track "L.O.V.E". Despite expectations not being high because of the disappointment behind their previous album Leave Ms. Kim, the song was an instant success and immediately gained nationwide recognition, with the group earning their first No. 1 song and their first music show win.

== Track listing ==
CD1 Tracklist
No.	Title	Writer(s)	Length
1.	"Love Action" (feat. Cho PD)	Cho PD, Yoon Il-sang	3:26
2.	"L.O.V.E"	Kim Eana, Miryo, saintbinary, Lee Min-soo	3:37
3.	"Breakup Letter" (이별편지)	Kim Eana, Ron Boustead, Michael McGregor	4:16
4.	"Love Action" (Rap by Miryo)	Cho PD, Yoon Il-sang, Miryo	3:26
5.	"Love Action" (inst.)	Cho PD, Yoon Il-sang	3:26
6.	"L.O.V.E" (inst.)	Kim Eana, Miryo, saintbinary, Lee Min-soo	3:37
7.	"Breakup Letter" (이별편지) (inst.)	Kim Eana, Ron Boustead, Michael McGregor	4:16
Total length:			26:04

== Cover versions ==
- "L.O.V.E" was covered by girl group Weeekly in a collaboration between the group and the original song's writer, Kim Eana. The cover was released on July 21, 2022.
- "L.O.V.E" was sampled by DJ, music producing and composing duo GroovyRoom for their single "Yes or No" featuring Huh Yunjin of Le Sserafim and Crush. It was released on January 7, 2024.

== Release history ==
Release dates and formats for With L.O.V.E
Region	Date	Format	Label
South Korea	January 17, 2008	CD, digital download	Nega Network
Worldwide	January 17, 2008	Digital download	Nega Network
