= Lunafly =

South Korean music duo

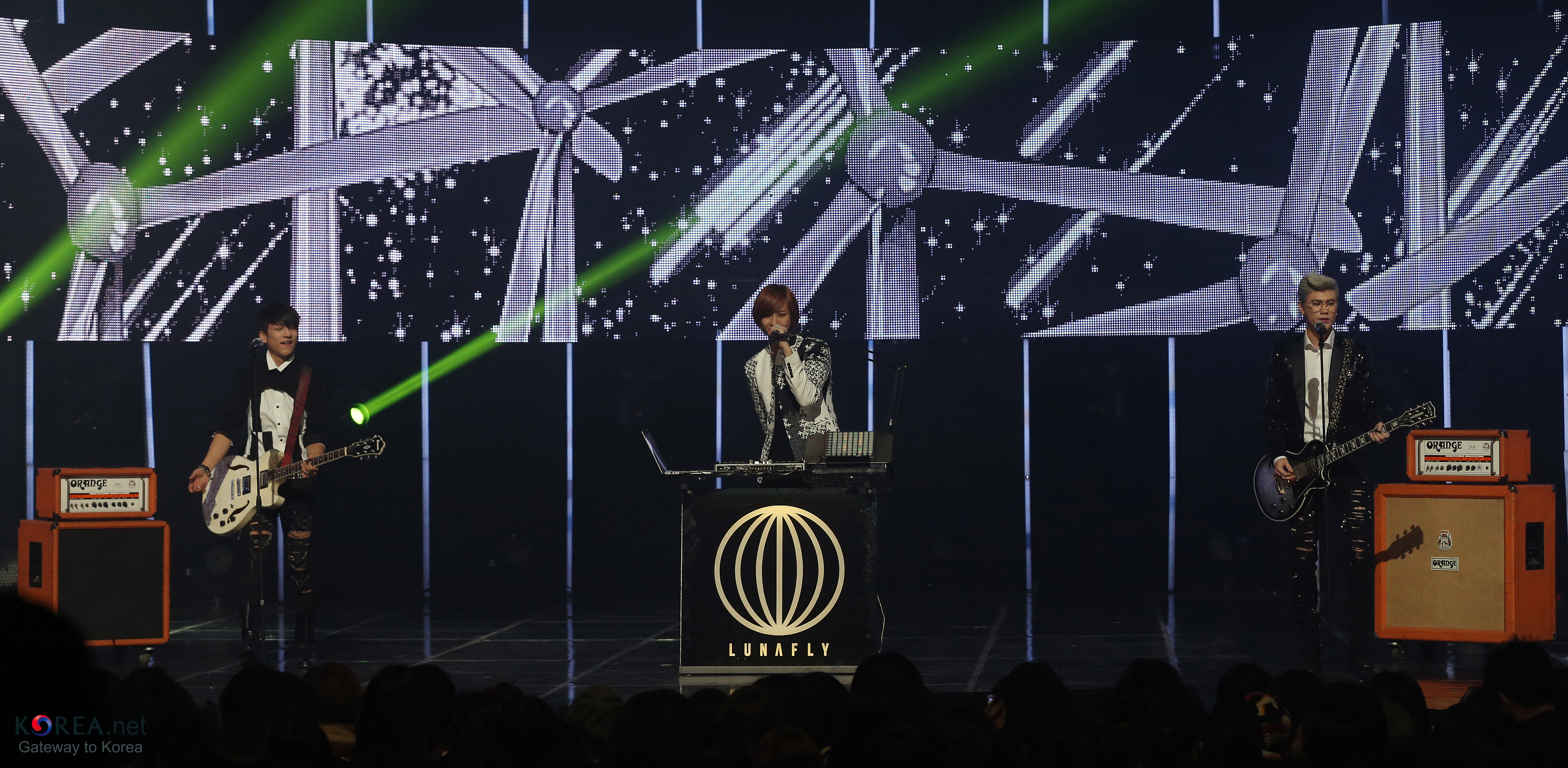
- Lunafly performing in 2014

Background information
- Origin: Seoul, South Korea
- Genres: Pop, K-pop, acoustic
- Years active: 2012–2016
- Label: Nega Network
- Members: Sam Carter; Yun (Han Seung Yun)
- Past members: Shin Taeho (Teo); Jin; Yub
- Website: http://www.neganetwork.com/

Lunafly (Korean: 루나플라이; sometimes stylized as LUNAFLY) is a South Korean duo, consisting of Yun and Sam. They officially debuted on 27 September 2012 under Nega Network with their self-composed song How Nice Would It Be.

== Career ==
=== Predebut: New group announcement ===
On 31 August, label mate JeA, leader of Brown Eyed Girls, tweeted a photo of her and the three Lunafly members on her official Twitter account.

Following the news, on 6 September, Lunafly released their debut album on iTunes worldwide, called Super Hero. It consists of two tracks, oth in English, with the idea of "allowing international fans to fully appreciate their music".

=== 2012: Debut with How Nice Would It Be, Super Hero, Day by Day ===
Prior to the release of their first domestic single album on 27 September, on 26 September, Lunafly released their first music video for their song "How Nice Would It Be". It was said that Nega Network invested 150 million won (~US$134,078) on their outfits, accessories, hair and makeup styling for the music video, which is considered a lot for a rookie group. The debut would only be digital, as they would not have any broadcast activities. They had a positive response from netizens, who said they gave off an image that contrasted with that of typical Kpop groups.

"How Nice Would It Be" reached 1st on Cyworld‘s music chart.

On 28 September, Lunafly released the music video for the English version of their song "Super Hero". They had already released "Super Hero" on iTunes worldwide on 6 September. Shortly after Lunafly announced that they would be holding their first solo concert in Japan.

After announcing that they were gearing up for their second digital single, Lunafly revealed the single's title to be "Clear Day, Cloudy Day", with a scheduled release date of 5 December. This single would be self-composed.

On 1 December, the group made their appearance at Tokyo's FM Hall in Japan, where they successfully concluded their first overseas solo live. Before proceeding with their performances, Lunafly expressed, "We’re very thankful for being able to hold a solo live concert in Japan just two months after our debut and we’re also very nervous. We've prepared a lot." They played a total of six songs for their Japanese fans, and also promised to work hard so they could be more active in Japan.

On 4 December, Lunafly released the music video of second digital single "Clear Day, Cloudy Day". This song was self-composed by the members. "Clear Day, Cloudy Day" delivers a message of hope to those facing difficulties in the current generation.

On 9 December, Lunafly released the music video for the English version of their song "Day By Day". The song was composed by the members themselves. "Day By Day" was available on iTunes worldwide a day after the release of the video.

=== 2013: First album Fly To Love, music show debut ===
A contest to decide the fandom name was held from 27 February to 5 March, with the winner being awarded an autographed CD. On 7 March, Lunafly announced their official fanbase name, "Lukies", meaning that "Lunafly's Kingdom is Eternal", and that Lunafly aims to remain humble and hardworking even after achieving success.

On 17 March, Lunafly announced their comeback through their official Facebook. They would be releasing their first album, Fly To Love, on 3 April. They also released a teaser image featuring all three members. As opposed tho the more serious, monochrome, and simple image they had been giving before, this teaser gave off a more colorful and rock image, with bold colors, bright outfits and the members giving off a playful vibe. Following the full member teaser, they released three more solo teasers for the individual members. They also released a video teaser through their official YouTube account.

On 2 April, the boys released the music video for their title song "Fly To Love", after releasing the full album. The song was, again, composed by the members themselves. The upbeat song expresses the desire to break out from a mundane relationship and go on vacations around the world as a couple. Keeping international fans in mind, the two part album also featured an English version of every Korean track.

They performed their single for the first time at the GOGOS2 club in Hongdae, Seoul later on the same day. International fans were able to watch the full 90 minute live concert on their USTREAM channel. They performed for the first time on a live music broadcast with "Fly To Love" on 4 April, on M! Countdown, a show that features live performances of K-Pop idols. They also performed their song on Music Bank and Inkigayo, bothsimilar programs. They didn't win any of the performances, but nevertheless the song was still loved by fans all over the globe.

=== 2014–2015: Concerts in Latin America, Europe, Canada and line-up changes ===
Lunafly went on a sold out Latin America tour visiting Mexico, Guatemala, Peru, Brazil, and Costa Rica. This tour was made in partnership with MyMusicTaste, a concert crowdfunding platform. They also went on a European tour, stopping in Portugal, France, Romania, and Italy, also crowdfunded through MyMusicTaste.

It was announced on Lunafly's fan cafe that Teo would be withdrawing from Lunafly and would no longer be participating in Lunafly activities. He is now known professionally under his real name, Shin Tae Ho. Two new members, Jin and Yub, were added to Lunafly following Teo's departure.

Lunafly Re:Born then performed as a four-membered group in Guatemala and Bolivia, and for the first time in their career, they went to North America to perform in Canada. Lunafly had performed in a total of 32 countries and were the K-pop group who performed in the most countries.

== Members ==
- Sam Carter – leader, vocals, guitar, violin, composer
- Yun – vocals, guitar, drums, composer

=== Past members ===
- Teo – vocals, piano, bass, percussion, composer
- Jin – drummer, composer
- Yub – guitarist, composer

== Discography ==
=== Studio albums ===
Title	Album details	Peak chart positions	Sales
Title	Album details	KOR	Sales
Fly To Love	Released: 3 April 2013; Label: Nega Network; Format: CD, digital download; Track listing: 1. Kisses; 2. Fly To Love; 3. Help Me Find A Way; 4. 얼마나 좋을까 (How Nice Would It Be); 5. One More Step; 6. 맑은 날 흐린 날 (Clear Day Cloudy Day); 7. 니 이름이 뭐니? (What’s Your Name?); 8. 보고 있거나 보고 싶거나 (Seeing You or Missing You); 9. Kisses (Instrumental); 10. Fly to Love (Instrumental); 11. Van Gogh (Eng Ver.); 12. Fly To Love (Eng Ver.); 13. Innocent And Young (Eng Ver.); 14. Super Hero (Eng Ver.); 15. One More Step (Eng Ver.); 16. Day By Day (Eng Ver.); 17. What's Your Name? (Eng Ver.); 18. You Got That Something I Need (Eng Ver.); 19. Super Hero (Instrumental); 20. Day By Day (Instrumental)	16	KOR: 2,188
Hermosos Recuerdos	Released: 13 March 2015; Label: Nega Network; Format: Digital download	—	

=== Extended plays ===
Title	Album details	Peak chart positions	Sales
Title	Album details	KOR	Sales
Special Guy	Released: 10 March 2014; Label: Nega Network; Format: CD, digital download	14	KOR: 3,580

=== Singles ===
Title	Year	Peak chart position		Album
Title	Year	KOR	KOR Hot 100	Album
"Super Hero"	2012	—	—	Super Hero (single)
"How Nice Would It Be" (얼마나 좋을까)	2012	75	66	How Nice Would It Be (single)
"Clear Day, Cloudy Day" (맑은 날 흐린 날)	2012	119	—	Clear Day, Cloudy Day (single)
"Fly To Love"	2013	86	90	Fly To Love
"Yeowooya" (여우야; Hey Fox)	2013	65	—	Yeowooya (single)
"Stardust"	2013	—	—	Special Guy
"Special Guy" (특별한 남자) (feat. Miryo of Brown Eyed Girls)	2014	148	—	Special Guy
"Quiero Besarte"	2014	—	—	Hermosos Recuerdos
"This Isn't You" (너답지 않게 )	2016	—	—	This Isn't You (single)
"—" denotes releases that did not chart or were not released in that region.

=== Soundtrack appearances ===
Title	Year	Peak chart position	Album
Title	Year	KOR	Album
"Gilchi" (길치; Poor Sense of Direction)	2013	135	Bel Ami OST Part 2
"I Want To Love Again" (다시 사랑하고 싶다)	2014	169	Can We Fall in Love, Again? OST Part 2
