= 2009 Melon Music Awards =

2009 South Korean music award ceremony

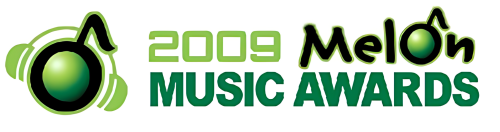
- Date: Wednesday, December 16, 2009
- Location: Olympic Hall, Olympic Park
- Country: South Korea
- Hosted by: Jang Keun-suk; Park Shin-hye (Only the Second Part)

Highlights
- Most awards: Girls' Generation (6)
- Album of the Year: Heartbreaker
- Artist of the Year: Girls' Generation
- Song of the Year: "Gee"
- Website: Melon Music Awards website

Television/radio coverage
- Network: MelOn, Y-Star, Dramax & Comedy TV (South Korea); Zune, Afreeca TV & GOM TV (Worldwide)

The 2009 Melon Music Awards were held on Wednesday, December 16, 2009, at the Olympic Hall, Olympic Park in Seoul, South Korea. Organized by Kakao M through its online music store Melon, it was the first offline installment of the event in the show's history, having previously been held online since 2005.

== Performers ==
List of performances at the 2009 Melon Music Awards
Artist(s)	Song(s)
Kim Tae-woo	"Love Snow"
Davichi	"All I Want for Christmas Is You" "8282" "Shout"
8Eight	"Without a Heart"
K.Will	"Miss, Miss and Miss" "With You"
Kara	"Wanna" "Mister" "Honey"
Brown Eyed Girls	"Sign" (remix) "Abracadabra"
2NE1	"Let’s Go Party" "Fire" "I Don’t Care"
Girls' Generation	"Genie" "Gee"
2PM	"Heartbeat" "Again & Again"
Kim Tae-woo; Ok Taec-yeon	"The Night When I Can't Sleep"
Lee Seung-chul	"Love is Difficult" "Don't Say Goodbye"

== Presenters ==
- Jang Keun-suk & Park Shin-hye (only the second part) – Official Host & Presenter for the Top 10 Award
- Kim Na-young – Backstage Host
- Kim Tae-hoon – Best Songwriter award
- Jung Yong-hwa & Lee In-hye – Best Special Album
- Hong Seok-cheon & Yu Soo-hyun (Note: One of the Lucky App User to be chosen to present the award.) – Best Smart Radio Artist / Seok-cheon then Later introduced 2PM
- Lim Yo-hwan & Kim Taek-yong – Best Oddyesey
- Jung Yoon-gi & Jin Bora – Best Mania Artist / Bora then Later introduced 2NE1
- Son Jang-min – Best Star Award
- Jang Kwang-ho – Best Current Stream Song Award
- Choi Hyun-woo – Introducing Girls Generation Performance & Presenting the As I thought, T-Mobile Music Award
- Yiruma & Kim Joo-won – Y-Star Live Award
- Kim Chang-wan – Best New Artist
- Joo Young-hoon & Lee Yoon-mi – Artist of the Year
- Kim Hyung-suk & Ahn Hye-kyoung – Album of the Year
- Kim Tae-won & Park Shin-hye – Song of the Year

== Winners and nominees ==
=== Main awards ===
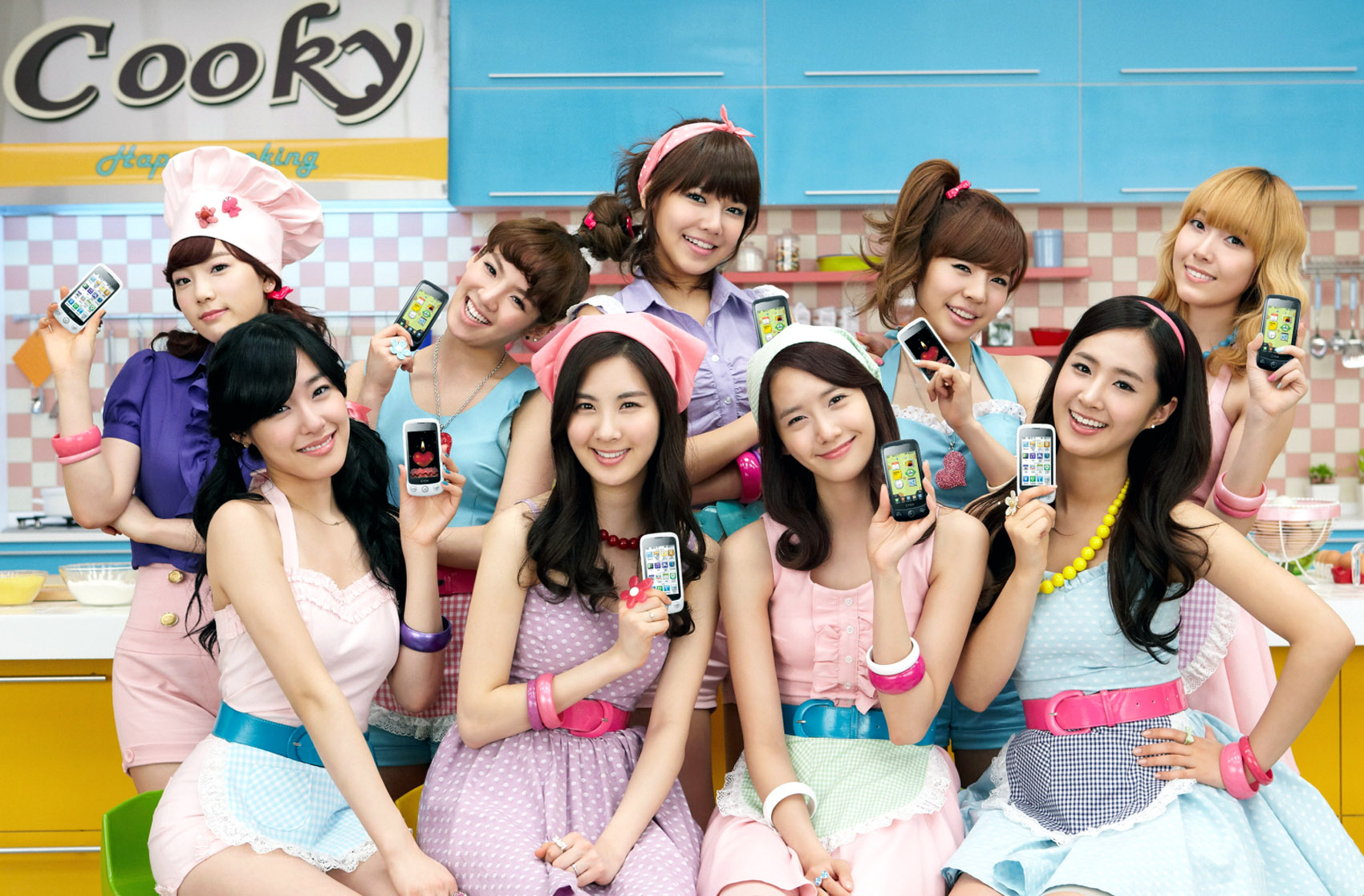
Girls' Generation

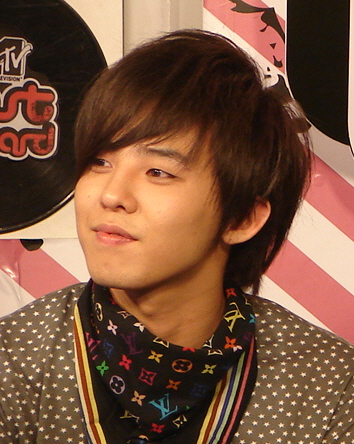
G-Dragon

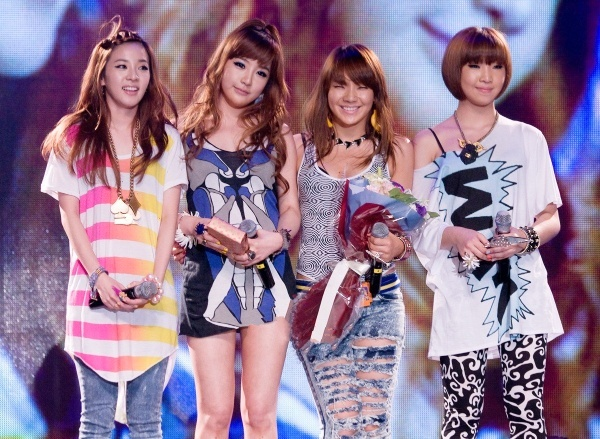
2NE1

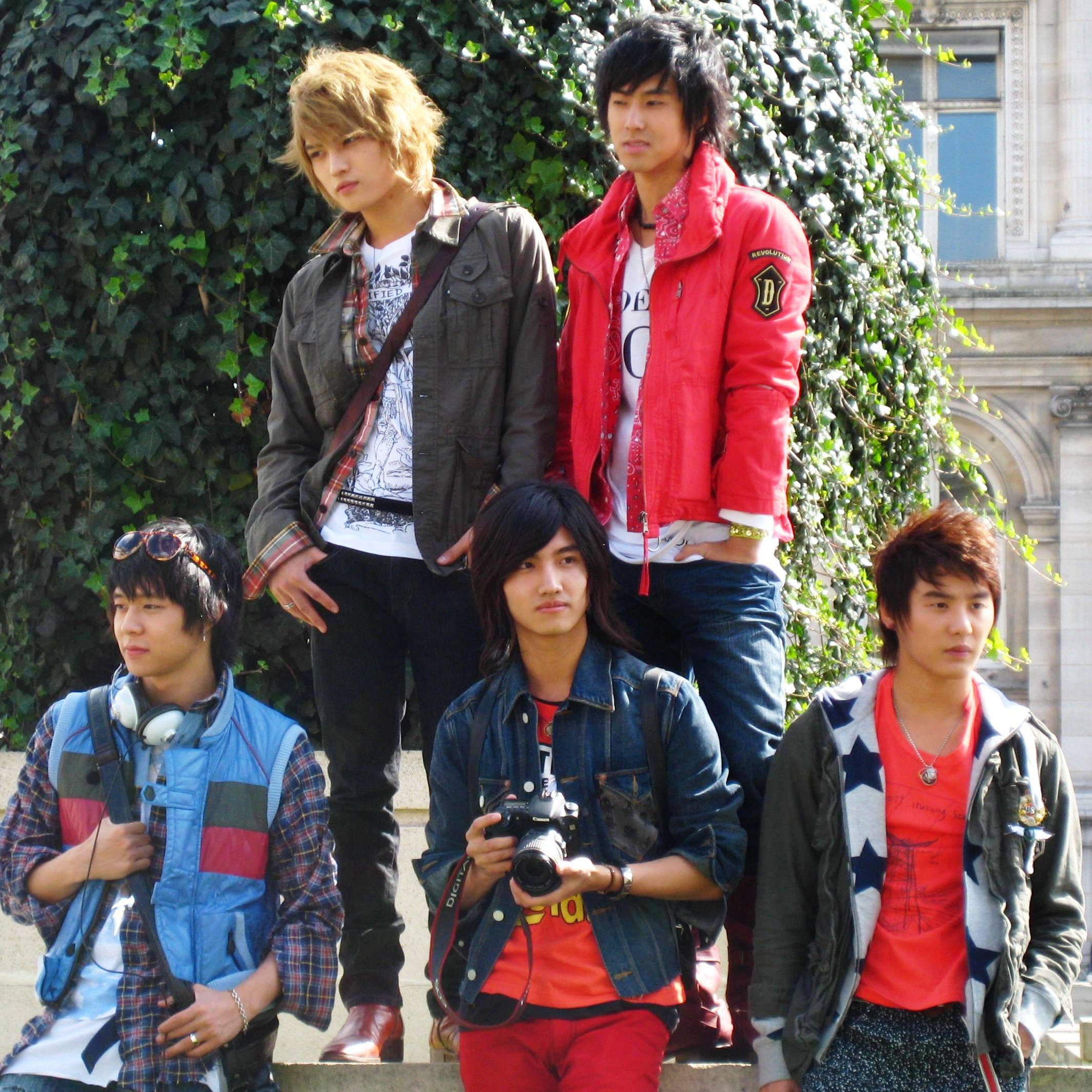
TVXQ

Winners and nominees are listed below. Winners are listed first and emphasized in bold.

Top 10 Artists (Bonsang)	Album of the Year (Daesang)
**2PM**; **2NE1**; **G-Dragon**; **Brown Eyed Girls**; **Girls' Generation**; **Kara**; **K.Will**; **8Eight**; **Davichi**; **Super Junior**	**G-Dragon – Heartbreaker**; 2NE1 – 2NE1 1st Mini Album; 2PM – 2:00PM Time for Change; Brown Eyed Girls – Sound-G; Davichi – Davichi in Wonderland; Girls' Generation – Gee; Kara – Revolution; MC Mong – Humanimal; Outsider – Maestro; SG Wannabe – Gift from SG Wannabe
Artist of the Year (Daesang)	Song of the Year (Daesang)
**Girls' Generation**; 2NE1; 2PM; 8Eight; Davichi; Brown Eyed Girls; Super Junior; Kara; K.Will; G-Dragon	**Girls' Generation** **– "Gee"**; 2NE1 – "Fire"; 2NE1 – "I Don't Care"; 2PM – "Again & Again"; 4Minute – "Hot Issue"; 8Eight – "I Have No Heart"; Davichi – "8282"; Davichi – "I Made a Mistake"; Baek Ji-young – "Candy in My Ear" (featuring Taecyeon); Brown Eyed Girls – "Abracadabra"; Big Bang & 2NE1 – "Lollipop"; Girls' Generation – "Genie"; Son Dam-bi – "Saturday Night"; Super Junior – "Sorry, Sorry"; SeeYa, Davichi, T-ara – "Women's Generation"; Lee Seung-gi – "Will You Marry Me"; K.Will – "Tears Dripping"; K.Will – "Love 119"; G-Dragon – "Heartbreaker"; Outsider – "The Alone"
Best New Artist	Best Special Album
**2NE1**; After School; f(x); 4Minute	**Infinite Challenge Olympic Highway Duet Song Festival**; My Fair Lady OST Collection; Boys Over Flower OST Collection; IRIS OST Collection; BlueBrand Part.1 By MC Mong

== Special awards ==
Best Smart Radio Artist Award	Best Mania Artist Award
Girls Generation; Wonder Girls; 2NE1; Fin.K.L; Kara	TVXQ; SS501; Girls Generation; Super Junior; 2NE1
Current Stream Song Award	Mobile Music Award
Kim Tae-woo – "Love Rain"; Leessang – "Girl Who Can't Break Up, Guy Who Can't Leave" (ft. Choi Jung-in); Park Bom – "You and I"; Park Hyo-shin – "After Love"; T-ara & Supernova – "T.T.L (Time To Love)"	Girls Generation – "Gee"; Brown Eyed Girls – "Abracadabra"; SeeYa, Davichi & Jiyeon – "Wonder Woman"; 2NE1 – "I Don't Care"; Lee Seung-gi – "Will You Marry Me" (ft. Bizniz)

=== Other awards ===
Category	Winners
Best Songwriter	"Hitman" Bang
Star Award	TVXQ – "Mirotic"
Odyssey Award	Girls' Generation – "Gee"
Sudden Rise Award	Leessang
Y-Star Live Award	Lee Seung-chul
