= Revive =

Revive or Revived may refer to:

== Music ==
- Revive (band), a Christian rock band
- Revive, classical album by Elīna Garanča, 2016
- Revive, studio album by Nemophila, 2021
- Revive (Brown Eyed Girls album)
- Revive (Steadman album)
- Revive+, studio album by Ive, 2026
- "Revive (Say Something)", song by LuvBug
- "Puzzle/Revive", a double A-side single by Mai Kuraki

== Products ==
- Revive, a flavor of Vitamin Water
- 7 UP Revive, a flavor of 7 Up
- Revive Adserver

== Other uses ==
- Revive (policy), Australian Government cultural policy
- Revive (video gaming), resurrecting a defeated character

== See also ==
- Revival (disambiguation)
- Reviver (disambiguation)
