= Your Story (album) =

Studio album by Brown Eyed Girls
- Released: March 9, 2006
- Recorded: 2006
- Genre: K-pop; R&B; Hybrid soul
- Length: 1:01:00
- Language: Korean
- Label: Nega Network

Brown Eyed Girls chronology
Your Story (2006)	Leave Ms. Kim (2007)

Repackage edition cover

Singles from Your Story
- 1. "Hold the Line" Released: May 3, 2006

Your Story is the debut studio album by South Korean girl group Brown Eyed Girls. The album was released on March 9, 2006. The official repackage for the album, featuring the single "Hold The Line" was released on August 25, 2006.

== Background ==
Brown Eyed Girls were originally a faceless group, marketed as the "female Brown Eyes". The group's debut had been in preparation for about three years before release, each member of the Brown Eyed Girls chosen specially by JeA the years prior. Gap Entertainment, who produced the original Brown Eyes as well as Brown Eyed Soul, collaborated with Nega Network in producing the group. Due to their faceless concept, they did not appear on any broadcast stations or in their own music video.

== Concept ==
The concept of Your Story is for each song to portray a unique story that someone has thought of or experienced in their lifetime. The group experiments with a new genre that combines R&B and hip-hop, which Brown Eyed Girls calls hybrid soul.

== Release and promotion ==
Your Story was officially released on March 3, 2006 under Nega Network with the lead single "Come Closer" (다가와서), after being pre-released on streaming services on February 20. The album at first was not a commercial success, although it was later rereleased with a repackage on August 25, 2006, to include a new single, "Hold The Line" featuring Cho PD, which became a hit in South Korea. This is likely due to the fact that it was included in the setlist of songs for the popular arcade game Pump It Up NX2. With the repackage release, they got rid of their faceless concept, displaying the members JeA, Miryo, Narsha, and Gain for the first time.

== Track listing ==
CD1 Tracklist
No.	Title	Length
1.	"Second" (세컨드)	4:18
2.	"Come Closer" (다가와서)	4:14
3.	"Far Away" (feat. MC Bong)	3:59
4.	"String" (끈)	4:12
5.	"Everybody" (feat. Big Tone)	3:54
6.	"Forgetting" (잊어가잖아)	4:48
7.	"Fly Up with You Tonight" (오늘은 그대와 하늘 위로) (feat. Bobby Kim)	4:41
8.	"Who Do You Love?" (넌 누굴 사랑하니?)	4:37
9.	"1.2.3.4"	3:22
10.	"Monologue" (혼잣말)	3:27
11.	"Your Day of Arrival" (니가 오는 날)	4:06
12.	"Watch Out"	3:40
13.	"Unheard Story" (묻지 못한 이야기)	3:54
14.	"Finally I Can Talk About Love" (이제야 비로소 사랑을 말할 수 있다)	4:14
15.	"Timing"	4:04
Total length:		1:01:00

CD2 Repackaged edition
No.	Title	Length
1.	"Hold the Line" (feat. Cho PD)
2.	"Second" (Rock Remix Ver.)
3.	"Second" (Hip-Hop Remix Ver.)
4.	"Hold the Line" (Inst.)
5.	"Second" (Inst.)

== Release history ==
Release dates and formats for Your Story
Region	Date	Format	Label
South Korea	March 2, 2006	CD, digital download	Nega Network
Worldwide	March 2, 2006	Digital download	Nega Network
South Korea (repackage)	August 25, 2006	CD, digital download	Nega Network
