= Revivalist =

Revivalist may refer to:

- A person involved in revivalism (architecture)
- A person involved in language revitalization
- Revivalist (person), a person who holds or presides over Christian revivals
- A person involved in an Islamic revival
- Revivalist artist, a musician dedicated to reviving interest in a musical genre from an earlier era
- The Revivalists, an American rock band

== See also ==
- Revival (disambiguation)
- Revivalism (disambiguation)
- Revivalistics, a 2020 book by Ghil'ad Zuckermann
