= Revivalism =

Revivalism may refer to:

- Christian revival, a period of unusual blessing and activity in the life of the Christian Church
- Revivalism (architecture), the use of elements that echo the style of a previous architectural era that have or had fallen into disuse or abeyance between their heyday and period of revival

== See also ==
- Revival (disambiguation)
- Revivalist (disambiguation)
