= How Come =

How Come may refer to:

- "How Come" (D12 song), a 2004 song by D12
- "How Come" (Ronnie Lane song), a 1973 song by Ronnie Lane
- "How Come" (The Sports song), a 1981 song by The Sports
- "How Come", a 2008 song by Brown Eyed Girls from My Style
- "How Come", a 2006 song by James Morrison from Undiscovered
- "How Come", a 2004 song by Ray LaMontagne from Trouble
