= Black Box (Brown Eyed Girls album) =

Studio album by Brown Eyed Girls
- Released: July 29, 2013
- Recorded: 2013
- Genres: K-pop; R&B; dance
- Length: 32:47
- Language: Korean
- Labels: Nega Network; LOEN
- Producers: Yoon Il-sang; Lance

Brown Eyed Girls chronology
Sixth Sense (2011)	Black Box (2013)	Basic (2015)

Singles from Black Box
- 1. "레시피" Released: July 9, 2013; 2. "Kill Bill" Released: July 29, 2013

Black Box is the fifth studio album by South Korean girl group Brown Eyed Girls. The album was released on July 29, 2013. The song "Recipe" was released on July 9 as a digital single. The song "Kill Bill" was used as the promotional song.

== Concept ==
The name Black Box was used for the album since it is an album that recorded their journey just like a black box records things. Just like their teaser photos, they tried to ditch their strong image for a lighter and more feminine image. Title track "Kill Bill" has taken from Quentin Tarantino's film of the same name as a motif, which is about the revenge on a playboy. According to Jea, "The whistle in the intro of the song reminded me of the movie Kill Bill. Members said that it would a good idea so we filmed the music video as the homage to the movie and made the clothing have the mood of western dramas."

== Promotions ==
Brown Eyed Girls pre-released the song Recipe as a buzz single for their album. They released teaser pics announcing their full scale comeback in two years. The group made their first stage for their title track "Kill Bill" on July 28 on SBS's Inkigayo along with their pre-released track "Recipe". They dropped their fifth album and the MV the day after.

== Track listing ==
Black Box track listing
No.	Title	Writer(s)	Length
1.	"After Club"	JeA, Dancis, Miryo	3:54
2.	"I Want To Fly" (날아갈래; Naragallae)	Candy Sound, JeA, Kim Eana	3:17
3.	"Kill Bill"	Candy Sound, JeA, Kim Eana	3:26
4.	"Boy"	Haranhn, Miryo	3:30
5.	"Satisfaction"	Dancis, Miryo	3:38
6.	"Mystery Survivor"	east4a, Kim Eana, Miryo	3:45
7.	"He's Lying" (거짓말이야; Geojitmariya)	A-Team (14), Miryo	3:36
8.	"Recipe" (레시피)	Primary, Miryo, Choiza	3:42
9.	"Good Fellas"	Yoon Il Sang, Kim Eana, Miryo	3:59
Total length:			32:47

== Release history ==
Country	Date	Format	Label
South Korea	July 29, 2013	CD, Digital download	LOEN Entertainment Nega Network
Worldwide	July 29, 2013	Digital download	LOEN Entertainment Nega Network
