= Hold the Line (disambiguation) =

Hold the Line is a 1978 song by Toto.

Hold the Line may also refer to:

- Hold the Line, a 1961 song by Pete Seeger
- Hold the Line (Jeanette song), a 2003 song
- Hold the Line (Brown Eyed Girls song), a 2006 song
- Hold the Line (Avicii song), a 2019 song

== See also ==
- Please hold the line, a 2020 documentary by Pavel Cuzuioc
