= LC9 (band) =

South Korean boyband

- Origin: Seoul, South Korea
- Genres: K-pop, dance-pop
- Years active: 2013–2015
- Labels: Nega Network
- Past members: Rasa; J-Hyo; King; Jun; AO; E.Den
- Website: neganetwork.com/artist/LC9/about.asp?menucode=lc

LC9 (Korean: 엘씨나인) was a South Korean pop boy band formed by Nega Network. The group initially consisted of six members until member E.Den left to pursue his studies. Their name, LC9, means League of Competition #9. They debuted on May 9, 2013, with "MaMa Beat" on Mnet M! Countdown. The music video was released on the same day.

On January 23, 2016, the group's label announced that LC9 disbanded. Their contract wasn't renewed back on December 21, 2015, which led the group to an end.

== History ==
=== 2013–15: Career beginnings ===
Around April, Nega Network announced that they would be debuting a male group, currently nicknamed Brown Eyed Boys inspired by their fellow label seniors Brown Eyed Girls. After a series of teasers introducing each of the members, they made their official debut as LC9 on May 9, 2013, with their first mini album Skirmish, with the title track "MaMa Beat" featuring label-mate Gain. On the same day, LC9 held their debut stage on Mnet M! Countdown.

=== 2016: Disbandment ===
On January 23, 2016, Nega Network revealed that the group's contract ended on December 21 of the previous year. None of the members renewed their contracts, and LC9 dissolved as a result.

== Members ==
=== Former ===
- Rasa – leader, vocals, rapper
- J-Hyo – vocals, rapper
- King – vocals
- Jun – rapper
- AO – vocals, rapper
- E.Den – rapper

== Discography ==
=== Extended plays ===
Information	Track listing	Peak positions	Sales
Information	Track listing	KOR	Sales
Skirmish: Released: May 9, 2013; Language: Korean; Label: Nega Network; Format: CD, digital download	Track list: 1. "전초전" (Skirmish); 2. "MaMa Beat (feat. Gain)"; 3. "Hold On"; 4. "Ready Set Go"; 5. "전초전" (Instrumental); 6. "MaMa Beat (feat. Gain)" (Instrumental); 7. "Hold On" (Instrumental); 8. "Ready Set Go" (Instrumental)	12	KOR: 1,727+

=== Singles ===
Title	Year	Peak chart positions	Sales	Album
Title	Year	KOR	Sales	Album
"MaMa Beat (feat. Gain)"	2013	86	46,374 (digital)	Skirmish
"East of Eden"	2014	—	—	Non-album singles

== Videography ==
=== Music videos ===
Year	Music video	Length
2013	"MaMa Beat (feat. Gain)"	4:03
2013	"MaMa Beat (feat. Gain) (Dance ver.)"	3:23
2013	"Just A Dream (Cover of Nelly)"	4:05
2013	"What Makes You Beautiful (Cover of One Direction)"	3:22
2014	"East of Eden"	3:39
