= Sixth Sense (Brown Eyed Girls song) =

Single by Brown Eyed Girls

from the album Sixth Sense
- Released: September 16, 2011
- Recorded: May 6, 2011
- Genre: K-pop; electropop; dance-pop
- Length: 3:48
- Label: Nega Network
- Songwriters: Kim Eana; Lee Minsu; Jinu

Brown Eyed Girls singles chronology
"Hot Shot" (2011)	"Sixth Sense" (2011)	"Cleansing Cream" (2011)

"Sixth Sense" is a song recorded by South Korean girl group Brown Eyed Girls, released as the second single from the group's fourth studio album Sixth Sense in 2011. The song was covered by Lovelyz during Mnet's television program Queendom, and by Kiss of Life on MBC's television program Song Stealer.

== Composition ==
The song is composed in the key of F minor and spans for 3 minutes and 48 seconds. It spans from the low note of background vocal F_{3}, to the high mixed of F_{5}, with the highest note being the head voice note of F_{6}.

== Background and promotion ==
The song is written by Kim Eana (김이나). The lyrics concern "[r]esistance for freedom of expression through music via sixth sense." The promotions of the album and song "Sixth Sense" started in September 24, on MBC's Show! Music Core and was also promoted on the shows M! Countdown, Inkigayo and Music Bank.

== Accolades ==
=== Music program awards ===
Program	Date
M! Countdown (Mnet)	October 6, 2011
M! Countdown (Mnet)	October 20, 2011
Inkigayo (SBS)	October 16, 2011
Inkigayo (SBS)	October 23, 2011

== Charts and performance ==
The song was released to various digital outlets in September 2011, after which it quickly topped various online charts. It topped the Gaon Digital Chart during the week ending October 1, 2011 and has sold 2,585,879+ downloads.

=== Weekly chart ===
Chart (2011)	Peak position
South Korea (Gaon Digital Chart)	1

=== Year-end chart ===
Chart (2011)	Peak position
South Korea (Gaon Digital Chart)	59

== See also ==
- List of best-selling singles in South Korea
- List of monthly number-one songs of 2011 (South Korea)
