= Sound-G =

Studio album by Brown Eyed Girls
- Released: July 21, 2009
- Recorded: 2009
- Genre: K-pop; electronic; R&B
- Length: 77:01
- Language: Korean
- Label: Nega Network; Mnet Media
- Producer: Jo Young-chul; Lee Min-soo; east4a; Kim Eana

Brown Eyed Girls chronology
My Style (2008)	Sound-G (2009)	Festa On Ice 2010 (2010)

Repackage edition cover

Singles from Sound-G
- 1. "Candy Man" Released: July 8, 2009; 2. "Abracadabra" Released: July 20, 2009; 3. "Sign" Released: October 29, 2010

Sound-G is the third studio album by South Korean girl group Brown Eyed Girls. The album was released on July 21, 2009.

== Concept ==
Due to the various girl groups that debuted and succeeded in 2009 with a cute concept, Brown Eyed Girls felt that having a cute and innocent concept would work against them. According to a Neganetwork representative, "the girls will be going through a radical 180° image transformation, making them to be more outgoing girls. Brown Eyed Girls will be transforming themselves with city girls concept in mind, more mature and sexy."

== Release and promotion ==
The lead single "Abracadabra" was hugely successful. The song was released to various digital outlets in July 2009, after which it quickly topped various online charts. The song also won the "Mutizen Song" award on SBS's Inki Gayo music program. The song also won a "Best Dance/Electronic song of the year" in the 2010 Korean Music Awards. By the end of 2009, the song was downloaded 3,095,468 times, becoming one of the best-selling singles in that year. In December 2011, it was reported that "Abracadabra" is one of the biggest hits in the South Korean music history, with a huge popularity in Asia and 4,986,293 downloads in South Korea alone.

Later on, the group revealed a repackaged version of the album titled Sign that included a new single, "Sign", along with "Drunk On Sleep" and a remix of their previous hit "Abracadabra". The repackaged album was released along with the music video for "Sign". The original music video for "Sign" song caused controversy because of its content, as it featured scenes of violence and death, including Ga-In drowning in a tank of water. A Japanese music video for "Sign", which focuses primarily on the choreography, was released on January 17, 2011.

The quartet has been readying for their Japan debut since signing with major record label Sony Music Japan International. In August 2010, the group re-released Sound G in Japanese to promote them in the country, which indeed marks the beginning of their Japanese promotions.

== Track listing ==
CD1 Track list
No.	Title	Lyrics	Music	Arrangement	Length
1.	"Glam Girl"	Kim Eana, D'Day	KZ	KZ	3:12
2.	"Abracadabra" (아브라카다브라; Abeurakadabeura)	Kim Eana, Miryo	Lee Min-soo, Hitchhiker	Hitchhiker	3:04
3.	"Addiction" (중독; Jungdok)	Yoon Il-sang, Miryo	Yoon Il-sang	Yoon Il-sang	4:23
4.	"Candy Man"	Kim Eana, Miryo	Lee Min-soo, SAINT BINARY	Kim Taek-soo	3:26
5.	"Moody Night"	Miryo	EAST4A	EAST4A	3:42
6.	"Strange Days" (이상한 일; Isanghan Il)	Park Chang-hak	Haihm	Haihm	3:31
7.	"Can't Go" (못 가; Mot Ga)	Yoon Il-sang	Yoon Il-sang	Yoon Il-sang	4:06
8.	"Even If You Have Another One" (여자가 있어도; Yeojaga Isseodo)	Lee Sang-baek, Kim Dae-hyun	Lee Jin-sung	Kim Jaehyung	3:49
9.	"It'll Do Well" (잘할게요; Jalhalgeyo) (Jea's Solo)	JeA	JeA, Sodam	Kim Jiwoong	3:48
10.	"Abracadabra" (Inst.)		Lee Min-soo, Hitchhiker	Hitchhiker	3:04
11.	"Candy Man" (Inst.)		Lee Min-soo, SAINT BINARY	Kim Taek-soo	3:49
12.	"It'll Do Well" (Inst.)		JeA, Sodam	Kim Jiwoong	4:05
Total length:					43:55

CD2 Track list
No.	Title	Length
1.	"DJ Cloud translates L.O.V.E" (Cloud Remix)	3:54
2.	"Haihm translates Second" (Haihm rebuild)	4:44
3.	"East4A translates YOU" (East4 A Soulsome Mix)	4:15
4.	"Hitchhiker translates How Come" (어쩌다; Eojjeoda) (Hitchhiker (Jinu) Dynamic Mix)	4:26
5.	"Saintbinary translates Hold The Line" (Saintbinary Sweet Purple remix)	5:41
6.	"Junjaman translates My Style" (Junjaman Wet Dream Remix)	4:01
7.	"Fraktal translates Oasis" (Fraktal Desert Is Land Mix)	6:05
Total length:		33:06

CD Repackaged edition
No.	Title	Length
1.	"Sign"
2.	"Drunk on Sleep" (잠에 취해; Jame Chwihae)
3.	"Abracadabra" (Fraktal Voodoo Remix)
4.	"Sign" (Junjaman Remix)
5.	"Drunk on Sleep" (Inst.)

Japanese Edition track list
No.	Title	Length
1.	"Glam Girl"	3:12
2.	"Abracadabra"	3:04
3.	"Addiction" (중독; Jungdok)	4:23
4.	"Candy Man"	3:26
5.	"Moody Night"	3:42
6.	"Strange Days" (이상한 일; Isanghan Il)	3:31
7.	"Can't Go" (못 가; Mot Ga)	4:06
8.	"Even If You Have Another One" (여자가 있어도; Yeojaga Isseodo)	3:49
9.	"It'll Do Well" (잘할게요; Jalhalgeyo) (Jea's Solo)	3:48
10.	"DJ Cloud translates L.O.V.E" (Cloud Remix)	3:54
11.	"Haihm translates Second" (Haihm rebuild)	4:44
12.	"East4A translates YOU" (East4 A Soulsome Mix)	4:15
13.	"Hitchhiker translates How Come" (어쩌다; Eojjeoda) (Hitchhiker (Jinu) Dynamic Mix)	4:26
14.	"Saintbinary translates Hold The Line" (Saintbinary Sweet Purple remix)	5:41
15.	"Junjaman translates My Style" (Junjaman Wet Dream Remix)	4:01
16.	"Fraktal translates Oasis" (Fraktal Desert Is Land Mix)	6:05
17.	"Abracadabra" (Japanese Version)	3:04
18.	"Abracadabra" (Inst.)	3:04

== Release history ==
Release dates and formats for Sound-G
Region	Date	Format	Label
South Korea	July 21, 2009	CD, digital download	Mnet Media, Nega Network
Worldwide	July 21, 2009	Digital download	Mnet Media, Nega Network
South Korea (repackage)	October 29, 2009	CD, digital download	Mnet Media, Nega Network
