= Revive (Brown Eyed Girls album) =

Studio album by Brown Eyed Girls
- Released: October 28, 2019 (Digital); October 30, 2019 (Physical)
- Recorded: 2018–19
- Genre: K-pop; hip hop; ballad
- Length: 39:14
- Language: Korean
- Label: APOP; Kakao M
- Producer: Cho Young-cheol

Brown Eyed Girls chronology
Basic (2015)	Revive (2019)

Singles from Re vive
- 1. "Abandoned (내가 날 버린 이유)" Released: October 28, 2019; 2. "Wonder Woman (원더우먼)" Released: October 28, 2019

Revive (stylized as RE_vive) is the first cover studio album by South Korean girl group, Brown Eyed Girls. It also serves as the group's seventh studio album and the group's first comeback album since Basic in 2015. The album released on October 28, 2019, under APOP Entertainment and distributed by Kakao M. The album contains covers of different Korean songs from the 80's, 90's, and modern period.

== Background ==
Following the release of Basic in 2015, Brown Eyed Girls took an unofficial four year hiatus, which the member Gain cited was due to her taking a personal leave from the group in order to be with family and take vocal lessons to expand her role in the group from dancing. Member JeA also moved to Jeju island while Miyro continued to be active on YouTube. Narsha left APOP Entertainment in 2018, also stating that she would continue being a member of Brown Eyed Girls. A statement regarding the matter from APOP also revealed that the 4 members were preparing for a comeback.

On January 28, 2019, APOP Entertainment confirmed the group was planning to come back in the first half of the year. However, the album was not confirmed to be completed until September, with a new release date of October 2019. On October 10, the release date was finalized as October 28, and the title was announced the next day. On October 22, the track list and a highlight medley for the album was revealed, showing that the album was to be a cover album. On October 24, the title tracks were revealed to be "Wonder Woman" and "Abandoned", and the album cover was revealed on October 26.

== Release and reception ==
Revive was released on October 28, 2019, debuting at number 29 on the Gaon Chart and then peaking at number 24 the week after. It sold 5,673 copies. The album received positive reception, with Billboard describing the album as "a walk down memory lane of South Korea's sonic history with Brown Eyed Girls’ distinct artistic flare melded into it, adding something a little edgy and a little provocative into [the] songs."

== Track listing ==
No.	Title	Lyrics	Music	Original artist	Length
1.	"A Common Love Story" (결국 흔해 빠진 사랑얘기; gyeolgug heunhae ppajin salang-yaegi)	Park Changhark, Miryo	Yoon Sang	Yoon Sang	4:18
2.	"Abandoned" (내가 날 버린 이유; naega nal beolin iyu)	Kim Hee Tham, Miryo	Jung Jae Hyung	Basis	5:00
3.	"Wonder Woman"	Yoon Jong Shin	Yoon Jong Shin, Lee Geun Ho, Miryo	Jo Won-sun	3:53
4.	"Sorrow" (애수; aesu)	J. Y. Park, Yoo Gun-hyung	J. Y. Park, Yoo Gun-hyung	g.o.d	3:49
5.	"Goodbye With A Smile" (미소를 띄우며 나를 보낸 그 모습처럼; misoleul ttuiumyeo naleul bonaen geu moseubcheoleom)	Lee Eunha	Jang Duk	Lee Eun Ha & Kim Na-young	4:08
6.	"Love Only" (사랑밖엔 난 몰라; salangbakk-en nan molla)	Shim Soobong	Shim Soobong	Shim Soo-bong	2:58
7.	"Love Like A Spring Rain, Farewell Like A Winter Rain" (사랑은 봄비처럼 이별은 겨울비처럼; salang-eun bombicheoleom ibyeol-eun gyeoulbicheoleom)	Lim Hyun Jung	Lim Hyun Jung	Lim Hyun Jung	4:24
8.	"The Sky" (하늘; haneul)	Cho Dongik	Lee Byeong Woo	One Day	2:52
9.	"Invitation (feat. Uhm Jung-hwa)" (초대; chodae)	J. Y. Park, Miryo	J. Y. Park	Uhm Jung-hwa	3:27
10.	"The Letter" (편지; pyeonji)	Huh Seungkyoung	Kim Kwangjin	Kim Kwangjin	4:32
Total length:					39:14

== Charts ==
Chart (2019)	Peak position
South Korean Albums (Gaon)	24
