= Revival =

Revival or The Revival may refer to:

== Books and comics ==
- Revival (comics), a 2012–2017 series by Tim Seeley and Mike Norton
- Revival (novel), a 2014 novel by Stephen King

== Film, television, and stage ==
- Revival (2013 film), a Czech comedy film
- The Revival: Women and the Word, a 2016 American documentary
- The Revival (film), a 2017 American drama film
- Revival (TV series), a horror noir series based on the comics
- "Revival" (Death Note), a television episode
- "Revival" (The Outer Limits), episode 16 from season six
- "Revival" (Star Wars: The Clone Wars), episode one from season five
- Revival (television) of a former television series
- Revival (theatre), a new production of a previously produced work

== Music ==
- Revival (quartet), an American barbershop quartet
- Revival Records, a British record label

=== Albums ===
- Revival (As Hell Retreats album) or the title song, 2010
- Revival (Bellowhead album), 2014
- Revival (Core album), 1996
- Revival (Eminem album) or the title song, 2017
- Revival (Gillian Welch album), 1996
- Revival (Hugh Masekela album), 2005
- Revival (John Fogerty album), 2007
- Revival (Jully Black album), 2007
- Revival (Katchafire album), 2003
- Revival (Light the Torch album), 2018
- Revival (Petra album), 2001
- Revival (Reverend Horton Heat album) or the title song, 2004
- Revival (Selena Gomez album) or the title song (see below), 2015
- Revival (Soulfire Revolution album) or the title song, 2013
- Revival (Tara Oram album), 2011
- Revival (The Answer album), 2011
- Revival (Vancouver Sleep Clinic album) or the title song, 2017
- Revival (Live at the Gillioz), a concert film by the Ozark Mountain Daredevils, 2008
- The Revival (Tony! Toni! Toné! album), 1990
- Revival, a 1998 album by The Congos
- Revival, a 1995 album by Dance 2 Trance
- Revival, a 1989 album by David Mullen
- Revival, a 1991 album by Edin-Ådahl
- Revival, a 1977 album by George Coleman
- Revival, a 2017 album by Johnny Reid
- Revival, a 2001 album by Postmen
- Revival, a 1969 album by Q65
- Revival, a 2000 album by Reid Paley
- Revival, a 2017 album by Third Day
- The Revival, an EP by Royce da 5'9" released ahead of the album Street Hop, 2009

=== Songs ===
- "Revival" (Deerhunter song), 2010
- "Revival" (Eurythmics song), 1989
- "Revival" (Selena Gomez song), 2015
- "Revival (Love Is Everywhere)", by the Allman Brothers Band, 1970
- "Revival", by CIX, 2020
- "Revival", by Gregory Porter, 2020
- "Revival", by Orgy from Candyass, 1998
- "Revival", by Sara Evans from Slow Me Down, 2014
- "Revival", by Sigala from Brighter Days, 2018
- "Revival", by Soulsavers from It's Not How Far You Fall, It's the Way You Land, 2007
- "The Revival", by the Dear Hunter from Act V: Hymns with the Devil in Confessional, 2016
- "Revival", by Tsunomaki Watame

== Politics ==
- Democratic Revival, a Greek political party
- Revival Party, a political party in Iran between 1920 and 1960
- Revival (Bulgaria), founded 2014
- Revival Party (Moldova), a left-wing political party in Moldova
- Revival (Ukraine) (also translatable as Renaissance), a right-wing Developmentalist political party in Ukraine
- Aitaira (Revival), a political party in Abkhazia

== Religion ==
- Resuscitation
- Resurrection
- Reincarnation
- Celtic Revival
- Christian revival, a revival of religious fervor or fervent traditions
  - Revival meeting, a series of Christian religious services held in order to inspire active members of a church body or to gain new converts
- Revival Centres International, a church group
- Islamic revival, an ongoing process since the 1970s
- Hindu revivalism

== Other uses ==
- Language revival of an extinct language
- Revival (sports team) of a defunct team
- De-extinction or revival of an extinct species
- Revival, Jamaica, a settlement in Westmoreland Parish
- The Revival (professional wrestling), a professional wrestling team now known as FTR
- The Revival (magazine), a magazine for British Muslims
- Revival FM, a Christian-based radio station in Scotland

== See also ==
- Islamic Renaissance Party of Tajikistan or Islamic Party of Revival
- Revivalism (architecture), the use of visual styles that consciously echo the style of a previous architectural era
- Revivalistics
- Revive (disambiguation)
- Palingenesis
- Renaissance
