= Abracadabra (Brown Eyed Girls song) =

Single by Brown Eyed Girls

from the album Sound-G
- Released: July 20, 2009
- Recorded: 2009
- Genre: K-pop; electronica
- Length: 3:04
- Label: Nega Network
- Composers: Hitchhiker; Lee Min-soo
- Lyricists: Kim Eana; Miryo
- Producer: Hitchhiker

Brown Eyed Girls singles chronology
"Candy Man" (2009)	"Abracadabra" (2009)	"Sign" (2009)

"Abracadabra" (Korean: 아브라카다브라) is a song recorded by South Korean girl group Brown Eyed Girls. Released as the second single from Sound-G in July 2009, it marked a change in the group's image and style. The song topped various on- and offline charts, including a 3-week chart-topping run on music portal Mnet.

== Background and release ==
The song lyrics is written by Kim Eana, while Miryo wrote the rap lyrics. It is composed by Lee Min-soo and Hitchhiker, who also held the production and arrangement. Due to the various girl groups that debuted and succeeded in 2009, the Brown Eyed Girls felt that having a cute and innocent concept would work against them; as such, they came back as "sexy bad girls". The group returned to the various network music shows at the end of July, continuing the mature concept.

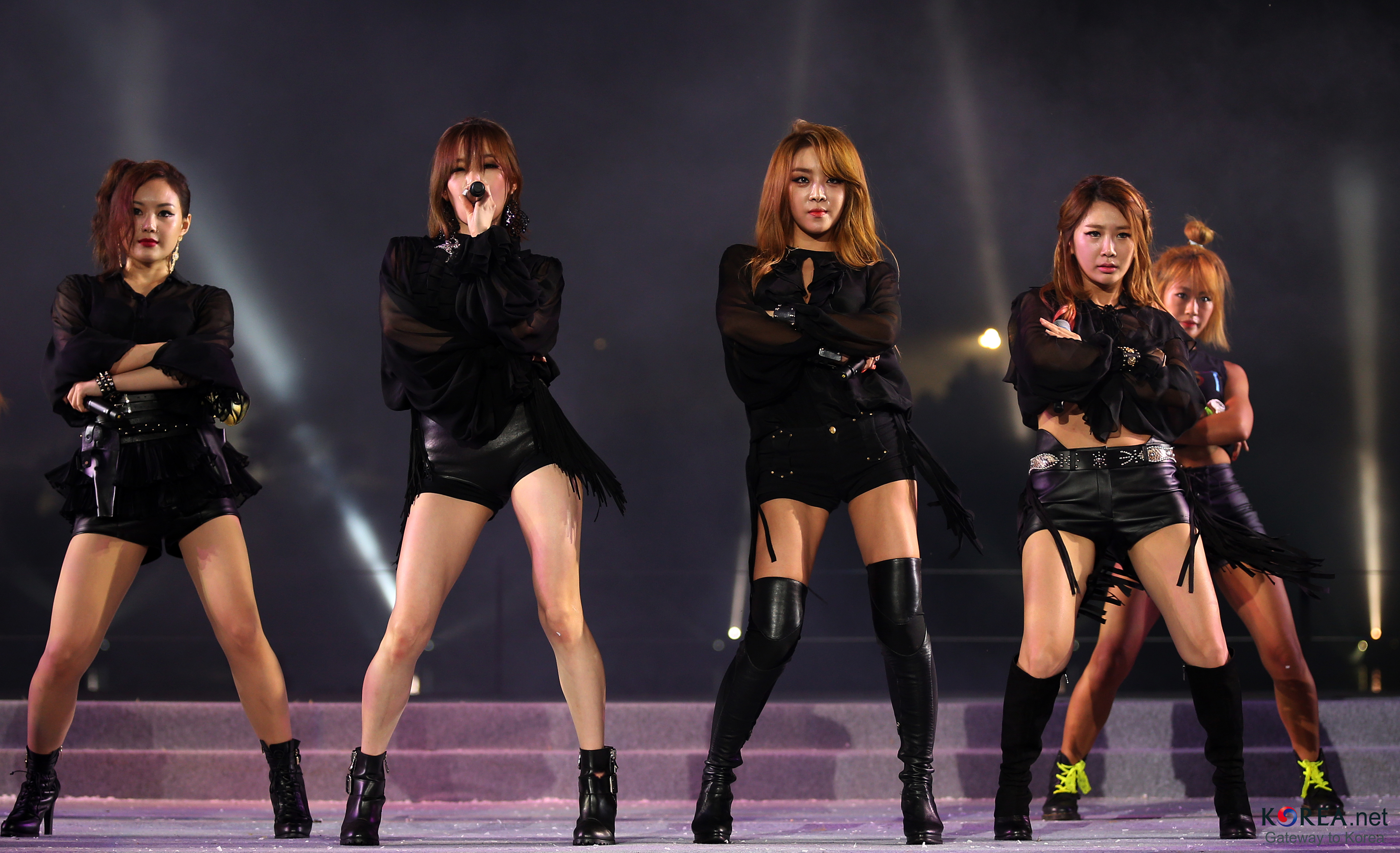
Brown Eyed Girls perform their "Arrogant Dance" at the 2013 World Rowing Championship

== Lyrics ==
The song was originally titled "Voodoo". The lyric is about a blind love, and especially the phrase, 'a doll resembling you' implies a ritual popularly associated with the religion. However, as the title mentioning the specific religion was caught up by the censorship, it was replaced with the current title meaning a conjuration.

== Reception ==
The song was released to various digital outlets in July 2009, after which it quickly topped various online charts. The song also won the "Mutizen Song" award on SBS's Inkigayo music program. The song also won Best Dance & Electronic Song at the 2010 Korean Music Awards.

== Music video ==
A screenshot of the music video

The 4-minute-long music video was directed by Hwang Sua, who had studied Film at New York University and established a career as a music video and commercial director. The video was praised for its sensational and intense presentation but also garnered controversies regarding its sensual contexts. In a 2009 interview, Hwang said she wanted to express the feelings of the subject in the song going back and forth between reason and emotion in a modern and fashionable choreography since the main theme is a curse and blind love. She divided the video into two settings; performing scenes of the band and narrative drama scenes. The former are in a white background with toned-down saturation to prevent other narrative stories from conflicting the latter, and to represent an infinite space.

Teasers for the music video were released in mid-July 2009, hinting at a possible kiss scene between members Ga-in and Narsha. After its full release, netizens posted critical remarks of the video due to its suggestive content. However, the "Arrogant Dance" (Korean: 시건방춤; RR: Sigeonbangchum), showing the members moving their hips left and right, became popular.

Various news agencies reported that member Ga-in watched pornography in order to prepare for the video's dance sequences. However, on the August 29 broadcast of Star Golden Bell, Ga-in clarified the misunderstanding, stating that she watched sensual movies, namely 9½ Weeks.

== In popular culture ==
In August 2009, a parody video was created by members of One Day (a collective name of 2AM and 2PM), appearing as "Dirty Eyed Girls" (드러운 아이드 걸스), in an episode of 2PM's variety show Wild Bunny. The Brown Eyed Girls said that they were thankful in response, as it showcased the video's popularity.

In April 2013, Psy used the "Abracadabra" dance in his music video for "Gentleman", which also featured the Brown Eyed Girls member Ga-in. A dance cover by the Brown Eyed Girls themselves was later uploaded onto Psy's YouTube channel on May 3, 2013.

In 2023, (G)I-dle performed a cover of the song at their third fan meeting, and reprised the cover at their 2 album fan meeting event in 2024. KBS then released it as a cover single on online streaming platforms on March 11, 2024.

== Credits and personnel ==
Credits adapted from the album's liner notes.

Studio

- Nega Studio – recording, mixing
- Sonic Korea – mastering

Personnel

- Brown Eyed Girls – vocals, background vocals
  - Miryo – lyrics
- Kim Eana – lyrics
- Hitchhiker – producer, composition, arrangement
- Lee Min-soo – composition
- Kang Hae-koo – recording
- Park Sun-young – recording
- Jung So-jin – engineering assistant
- Oh Jae-won – mixing
- Jeon Hoon – mastering

== Accolades ==
Awards and nominations
Year	Organization	Award	Result	Ref.
2009	Cyworld Digital Music Awards	Song of the Month (August)	Won	
2009	Golden Disc Awards	Digital Music Bonsang	Nominated	
2009	Mnet Asian Music Awards	Best House & Electronic	Won	
2010	Cyworld Digital Music Awards	Bonsang	Won	
2010	Cyworld Digital Music Awards	Song of the Year	Nominated	
2010	Korean Music Awards	Best Dance & Electronic Song	Won	

Music program awards
Program	Date
SBS's Inkigayo	August 16, 2009
SBS's Inkigayo	August 23, 2009
Mnet's M Countdown	August 20, 2009
Mnet's M Countdown	September 3, 2009
KBS's Music Bank	August 21, 2009
