= Sixth Sense (Brown Eyed Girls album) =

Studio album by Brown Eyed Girls
- Released: September 23, 2011
- Recorded: 2011
- Genre: K-pop; R&B
- Length: 28:53
- Language: Korean
- Label: Nega Network; LOEN
- Producer: Jo Young-chul; Lee Min-soo; Kim Eana

Brown Eyed Girls chronology
| Festa On Ice 2010 (2010) | Sixth Sense (2011) | Black Box (2013) |

Singles from Sixth Sense
- 1. "Hot Shot" Released: September 16, 2011; 2. "Sixth Sense" Released: September 23, 2011; 3. "Cleansing Cream" Released: November 4, 2011

Sixth Sense is the fourth studio album released by the South Korean girl group Brown Eyed Girls. The album was released on 23 September 2011. The song with the same title was used as the promotional song. The song "Hot Shot" was released on September 16 as a teaser for the album. A repackaged version of the album was released on November 4. The repackaged album comes with a DVD, a 40-pages photobook, a calendar with 12 pages, 4 autographed cards by the girls and a poster.

== Concept ==
The concept for the album is “Resistance for freedom of expression through music via sixth sense.” Representatives of NegaNetwork explained, “This album focuses not only on their singing and performance. The members hope to convey their thoughts to the public through music. Their title track is an expression of the limitations of experiencing music with only five senses, and it asks people to feel it instead with their sixth sense. The song itself is very free in style.”

== Promotions ==
The promotions of the album and song "Sixth Sense" started in September 24, on MBC's Show! Music Core and was also promoted on the shows M! Countdown, Inkigayo and Music Bank. The song "Hot Shot" was promoted during the comeback week. The song won four music show awards: two mutizens on Inkigayo and two awards on M! Countdown. The promotions of the song ended in October 23. Promotions for the song "Cleansing Cream" started in November 4, on Music Bank.

== Track listing ==
Vol. 4 Sixth Sense
| No. | Title | Lyrics | Music | Length |
|---|---|---|---|---|
| 1. | "Swing it Shorty" (Intro) | | Junjaman, Lee Min Soo | 1:21 |
| 2. | "Sixth Sense" | Kim Eana | Lee Min Soo | 3:48 |
| 3. | "Hot Shot" | Kim Eana | east4a, Lee Min Soo | 3:21 |
| 4. | "La Boheme" | D'Day | Yoon Il Sang | 3:48 |
| 5. | "An Inconvenient Truth" (불편한 진실; Bulpyeonhan Jinsil) | JeA, Kim Eana | JeA, KZ | 3:48 |
| 6. | "Lovemotion" | Kim Eana | east4a | 3:22 |
| 7. | "Countdown" (Interlude) | D'Day, Kim Eana | KZ | 1:50 |
| 8. | "Vendetta" | Kim Eana | KZ | 3:41 |
| 9. | "Sixth Sense" (Instrumental) | | | 3:48 |
| Total length: | | | | 28:53 |

CD Repackaged edition
| No. | Title | Length |
|---|---|---|
| 9. | "Cleansing Cream" (클렌징크림) | 3:33 |
| 10. | "Sixth Sense" (Instrumental) | 3:48 |
| Total length: | | 32:26 |

DVD Repackaged edition
| No. | Title | Length |
|---|---|---|
| 1. | "Jacket Shooting" |
| 2. | "Hot Shot" (Music video - Making of) |
| 3. | "Hot Shot" (Music video) |
| 4. | "Sixth Sense" (Music video - Making of) |
| 5. | "Sixth Sense" (Music video) |
| 6. | "Sixth Sense" (Music video - NG) |

== Chart performance ==
=== Album chart ===
==== Sixth Sense ====
| Chart | Peak position |
|---|---|
| Gaon Weekly album chart | 2 |
| Gaon Weekly domestic album chart | 2 |
| Gaon Monthly album chart | 9 |

==== Repackage ====
| Chart | Peak position |
|---|---|
| Gaon Weekly album chart | 6 |
| Gaon Weekly domestic album chart | 6 |
| Gaon Weekly album chart | 17 |

=== Single chart ===
The title track "Sixth Sense" debuted atop the spot of the Gaon Single Chart with 511,798 downloads in its first week of release. By the end of 2011 the song was downloaded 2,585,879 times and it earned the position #29 in the Gaon Year-end Chart, but the song continued to achieve downloads in 2012, in fact by the end of July it was reported that the song has accumulated 3,991,637 downloads.

| Song | Peak chart position | |
| Song | KOR | KOR |
| Song | Gaon Chart | K-Pop Billboard |
|---|---|---|
| "Sixth Sense" | 1 | 2 |
| "Hot Shot" | 2 | 6 |
| "Cleansing Cream" | 4 | 6 |

==== Other songs charted ====
| Song | Peak chart position | |
| Song | KOR | KOR |
| Song | Gaon Chart | K-Pop Billboard |
|---|---|---|
| "An Inconvenient Truth" | 13 | 23 |
| "Vendetta" | 62 | 50 |
| "Lovemotion" | 63 | 78 |
| "La Boheme" | 74 | - |
| "Countdown (Interlude)" | 148 | - |
| "Swing it Shorty (Intro)" | 183 | - |

=== Sales and certifications ===
| Chart | Amount |
|---|---|
| Gaon physical sales | 33,197+ (Album + Repackaged) |

== Release history ==
| Country | Date | Format | Label |
|---|---|---|---|
| South Korea | September 23, 2011 | CD, Digital download | LOEN Entertainment Nega Network |
| Worldwide | September 23, 2011 | Digital download | LOEN Entertainment Nega Network |
