= Narsha =

South Korean singer and actress (born 1981)

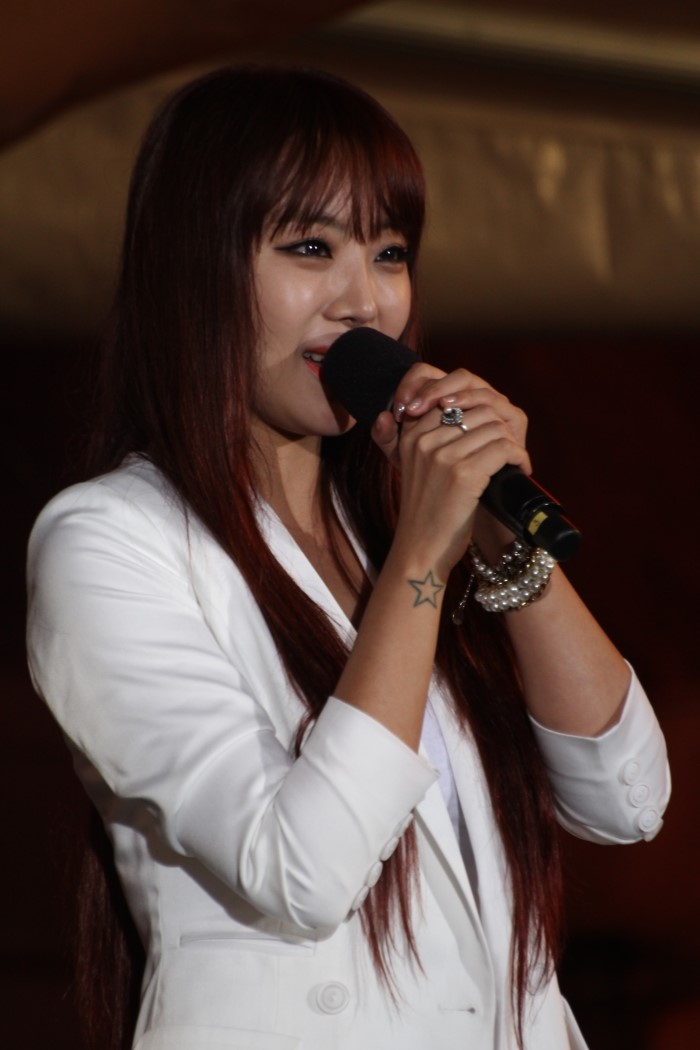
- Narsha at the Expo in July 2012
- Born: Park Hyo-jin (박효진); December 28, 1981 (age 44); Seoul, South Korea
- Occupations: Singer; actress
- Spouse(s): Hwang Tae-gyeong (m. 2016)
- Musical career
- Genres: K-pop; R&B
- Instrument: Vocals
- Years active: 2006–present
- Label: APOP
- Member of: Brown Eyed Girls

Korean name
- Hangul: 박효진
- RR: Bak Hyojin
- MR: Pak Hyojin

Stage name
- Hangul: 나르샤
- RR: Nareusya
- MR: Narŭsya

Park Hyo-jin (Korean: 박효진; born December 28, 1981), better known by her stage name Narsha, is a South Korean singer and actress. She is best known as a member of the South Korean girl group Brown Eyed Girls. Her stage name, Narsha, is derived from the term na-reu-sha, which means 'to fly up' in Middle Korean and was given to her by a former manager.

== Career ==
=== Debut with Brown Eyed Girls ===
She became a member of Brown Eyed Girls after a suggestion by JeA, who had been her friend since their high-school years. The four members held several small size concerts, and considered names like "Crescendo" or "Dark Angel" before officially debuting as "Brown Eyed Girls". After more than 3 years of training in singing and holding several small size concerts, the Brown Eyed Girls released their debut album Your Story in South Korea in February 2006, with the ballad track, "Come Closer" as their single.

=== M&N ===
After Brown Eyed Girls' Kill Bill activities in 2013, the first BEG unit was announced. Miryo and Narsha formed M&N. The original name was '언니둘' (Two Sisters) and it was suggested that if JeA were to join them, they would switch their name to '언니들' (The Sisters).

M&N was introduced as a hip hop group as both Miryo and Narsha are avid fans of the Hip Hop genre, however their first digital single fell under the easy listening genre. The group has released a digital single named "Tonight" in both Korean and English.

== Solo activities ==
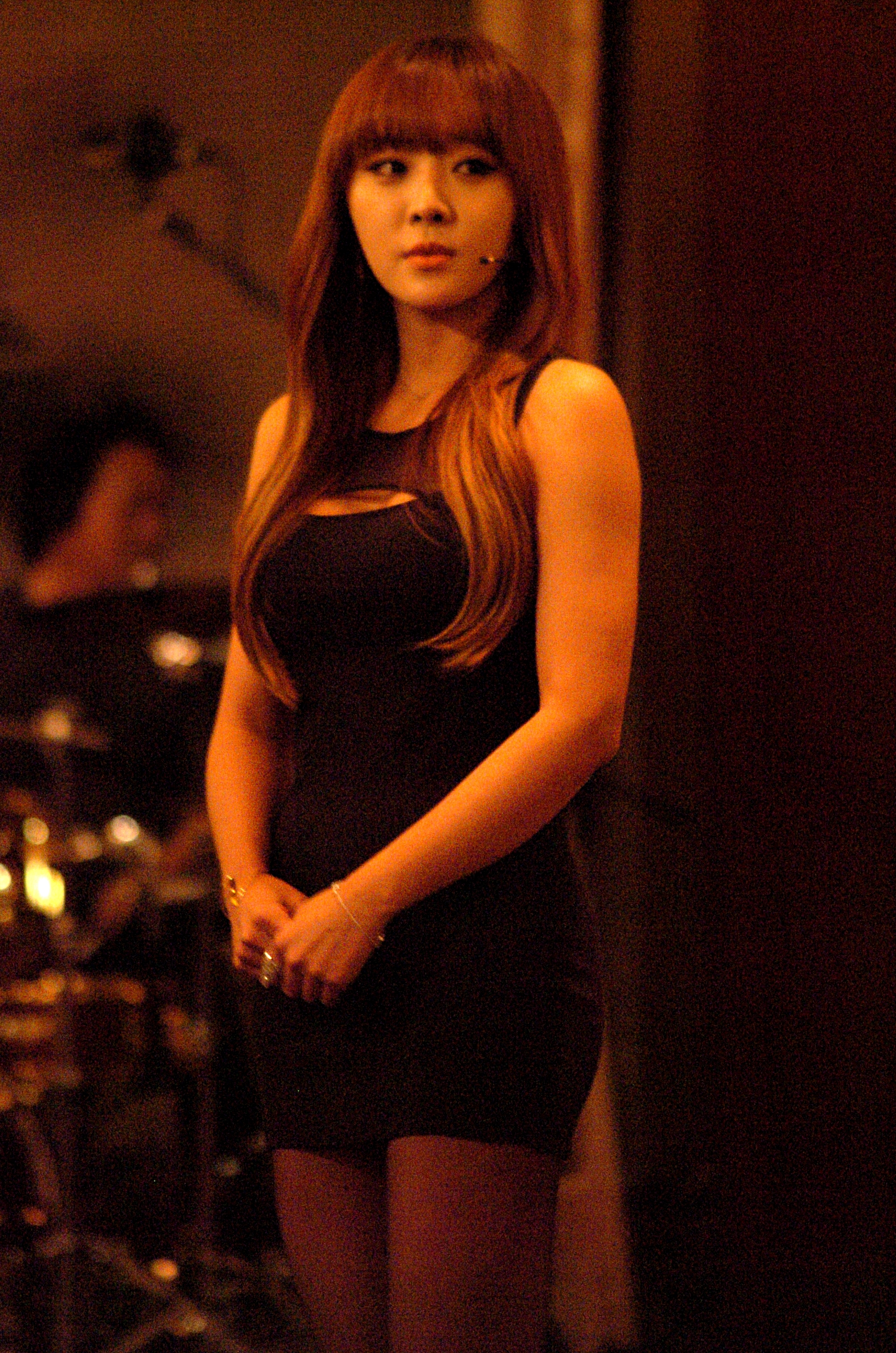
Narsha at the press conference of musical The Memory

=== Entertainer ===
During 2009, her popularity began to increase after she started appearing on many entertainment programs, including Heroes and Invincible Youth, on which she gained the nickname "Adult-dol" (성인돌). She became a DJ on Pump up the Volume (볼륨을 높여요) on KBS Cool FM, from 8 pm until 10 pm but due to Brown Eyed Girls' overseas promotions Narsha decided to leave the show, with her last broadcast on December 28, 2010.

She made her debut as an MC through OnStyle's fashion program, Style Show Fil on June 16, 2011. Narsha made her acting debut through MBC's drama series Lights and Shadows playing the role of singer aspirant Hye-bin, followed by Ohlala Couple as Moosan, the goddess of love. In 2012, she also provided the voice for the main antagonist The White Wolf in the Korean version of Christmas movie Niko: Santa Air Wing's Adventure. She has also made a name as a smartphone director, as well as a musical actress.

=== Solo artist ===
Narsha announced her intention to make her solo debut in early 2010. Her first solo single, "I'm In Love", was released digitally on July 1, 2010, as a preview for her upcoming album. Her first solo studio album, the eponymous NARSHA, was released on July 8, 2010. The title song "Bbi Ri Bba Bba" charted on Gaon's Top 100 digital sales, most streamed and downloaded songs for 2010. The album contained a preview for "Mamma Mia", a collaboration with, at the time, fellow Nega Network group Sunny Hill, which was released fully on August 20. The album was also worked on by many composers who had contributed musically to Brown Eyed Girls' third album, Sound-G.

She was then featured on fellow member Miryo's track "Leggo", taken from her 2012 debut EP. The two later formed a duo called "M&N" and had already released a single, titled "Tonight" in 2013. Aside from this, she also lend her vocals for some drama's soundtrack. Narsha also appeared as a fixed member for the cast of Immortal Songs 2, however due to her musical schedules she had to leave the show at the end of 2013.

In February 2022, she renewed her contract with Steit Entertainment.

== Filmography ==
=== Variety shows ===
Year	Title	Notes/Ref.
2009–2010	Invincible Youth	Fixed cast
2010	Waving The Korean Flag	Fixed Cast. South Africa FIFA World Cup Show.
2009–2010	Star Golden Bell	Regular cast
2009–2010	Intimate Note	Fixed Cast for Season 3
2010–2011	Heroes	Fixed Cast
2011	Style Show Fiㄹ	MC
2012	SNL Korea	Host of the December 15 episode, with JeA, Miryo and Gain
2013–2014	Immortal Songs 2	Known for a being a singer that have shown many different types of performances and have earned high praises.
2014	Celebrity Lives in Our House	Celebrity for the 1st and 2nd episode of the show. The show changes celebrity every now and then.
2014–2017	SNL Korea	Fixed crew for Season 5, 6
2015	Some Guy Some Girl	Cast
2015	Match Made in Heaven	Cast
2017	King of Mask Singer	Contestant as "Carrot Girl" (Episodes 125–126)
2021	Birth of a Rich Man	Host with Lee Sang-min
2023	Big Brother Era	Regular Member

=== Television drama ===
Year	Title	Role
2012	Lights and Shadows	Lee Hye-bin/Lee Jung-ja
2012	Ohlala Couple	Moosan Goddess
2013	Pure Love	Ha Soo Bin zul (ep 7 cameo)
2014	There is a Blue Bird: Cinderella Syndrome	Shin-ae
2014	The Clinic for Married Couples: Love and War	Hyun-jin (20s Special "Wife Is the Boss")
2014	Emergency Couple	Female patient (cameo, episode 19)
2014	A Witch's Love	Shaman (guest, episodes 1–4)
2014	MBC Drama Festival – "4Teen"	Sunglasses lady
2015	Save the Family	Jung Hee-jin

=== Movies ===
Year	Title	Type	Role	Notes
2011	The Guest Who Did Not Receive the Invitation	Smartphone Movie	Director	Received the Special Award in the 1st International Olleh Smartphone Film Festival
2012	Nico 2: Little Brother, Big Trouble: A Christmas Adventure	Animation	White Wolf Dubbing	
2013	Bug	Smartphone Movie	Director. Screenplay. Writer. (Movie plot is reality story based on the hardships Narsha faced when growing up)	Received the Special Award in the 3rd International Olleh Smartphone Film Festival

=== Web series ===
Year	Title	Role	Notes	Ref.
2021	Fantastic Nightmare season 1	director		

=== Musical theatre ===
Year	Title	Role
2013	When a Man Loves	Female Lead

=== Radio program ===
Year	Title	Ref.
2010	Volume Up	
2019–present	Narsha's Abracadabra	

== Discography ==
=== Extended plays ===
- Narsha (2010)

=== Singles ===
Title	Year	Peak chart positions	Sales (Digital)	Album
Title	Year	KOR	Sales (Digital)	Album
As lead artist
"I'm in Love" (with Sungha Jung)	2010	6	KOR: 1,074,722	Narsha
"Bbi Ri Bba Bba" (삐리빠빠)	2010	6	KOR: 1,489,583	Narsha
"Mamma Mia" (맘마미아) (with Sunny Hill)	2010	6	KOR: 1,064,728	Narsha
"Tonight" (오늘밤) (as M&N with Miryo)	2013	19	KOR: 147,511	Non-album single
"BLUSH" (feat. Babylon)	2023	—	—N/a	BLUSH
"GAME" (feat. Verbal Jint)	2023	—	—N/a	GAME
As featured artist
"Be My 1004" (iM feat. Narsha)	2007	—	—N/a	Non-album single
"Snow's Gift" (눈의 선물) (Lee Jae-hoon feat. Narsha)	2009	—	—N/a	First Whisper
"Living in My Heart" (가슴에 살아) (Untouchable feat. Narsha)	2010	6	KOR: 1,724,989	2nd Mini Album
"La La Land" (랄라랜드) (Cho PD feat. Narsha & JeA)	2010	22	—N/a	Part 2: Art of Business
"Bullshit" (지랄) (Humming Urban Stereo feat. Narsha)	2014	70	KOR: 39,404	Reform
"—" denotes releases that did not chart or were not released in that region.

=== Soundtrack appearances ===
Title	Year	Peak chart positions	Sales (Digital)	Album
Title	Year	KOR	Sales (Digital)	Album
"I Love You" (feat. Miryo)	2009	—	—N/a	My Fair Lady OST
"A Girl That You Know" (아는 여자)	2011	35	KOR: 290,564	The Thorn Birds OST
"—" denotes releases that did not chart or were not released in that region.
