= Yoon Il-sang =

Yoon Il-sang 윤일상
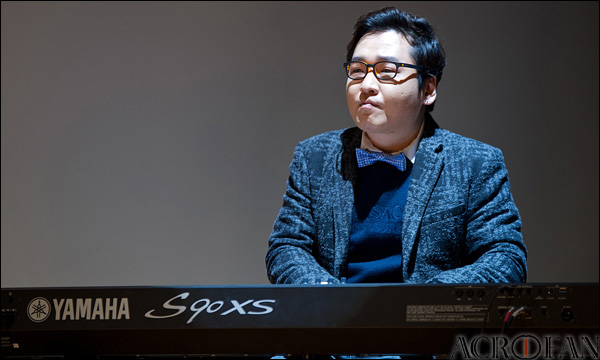
- Yoon in 2012

Background information
- Born: Yoon Il-sang; February 21, 1974 (age 51)
- Origin: South Korea
- Genres: K-pop
- Occupations: Composer; producer; songwriter
- Years active: 1985–present

Yoon Il-sang (Korean: 윤일상; born February 21, 1974) is a South Korean composer, producer, and songwriter. He graduated from Kyung Hee University Post Modern Music Department, and he is also the co-founder of Nega Network Ltd.

In January 2012, Yoon released a series of digital singles to celebrate his 21st year in the music industry, collectively titled, Yoon Il Sang 21st Anniversary. "Reminiscence" was originally sung in 1997 by Turbo and sold 1,200,000 copies, whereas "Remember" was first released by DJ Doc in 1996 and sold 1,300,000 copies.

== Discography ==
Year	Album Information	Track listing
2012	Yoon Il Sang 21st Anniversary digital singles	"Sorrow" - 10cm; "I'm Missing You" - Paul Potts; "Reminiscence" - Super Junior K.R.Y; "Remember" - JK Kim Dong-wook and features Miryo of Brown Eyed Girls

== Filmography ==
=== TV series ===
- Big Bet (2022)- Disney+
- Low Life (2025) - Disney+

== Producer ==
- "Breaking Destiny" - The Great Seer OST sung by Park Gyuri of Kara

== Biography ==
Yoon first started composing music in 1980, and started working on popular music in 1985. In 1993, the Park Jun-hee songs "Oh, Boy" and "KukKuk" was released. Also in 1993, the Mr2 song "난 단지 나일뿐" was released.

1993 : He's the first hitsong '난 단지 나일뿐' of Mr2 released

1994 : Produced his first album '망가져가'of EQ released

1995 : Buck's first album produced

1997 : The first Project album 'SSaiki' released

1998 : Yoo Seung Jun's 2nd album produced

1999 : Park ji yoon's 3rd album produced

2000 : He was selected as a Most hits song composer since the last 10 years.

2001 : Lee yoon jung's 2nd album produced Kim bum so's 'Day (Hello. Goodbye. Hello) '51 of The Billboard Hot 100 Singles Sales chart entry

2002 : Solo album 'IS-Soulist' released, Lee jung hyun 4th album'I Love Nature'produced

2003 : Kim bum so's 'BOGOSIPDA'released (Drama Stairway to Heaven OST), Daum Game 'Rakiah' Music Director

2004 : 'Drama Bulsae OST' released. Lee seung chul 'Yin Yeon' released, Lee jung hyun 5th album produced.

2006 : SBS Drama 'Tree of Heaven' Music Director. Shin seung hoon 'e ddek hajyo' MBC Drama 'Rude girls' Music Director. Lee mun se 'Alsuupnun Insaeng' PDIS The first single 'Hold The Line' released. Mobil Lee jung hyun 6th album produced Japanese group Deen's new album 'Bogosipda' released.

2007 BrownEyedGirls single album'OASIS'released.

2008 Drama 'Nae saenge Masimak Scandal' Music Director

2009 PDIS (Jo PD + Yoon il sang) album released, Ivy-Sensatio, Mina-DODO, Hanyoung - Diet, BrownEyedGirls - Mot ga, Jung dok, Cool-BogoBogo, Lee jung hyun – nun naekke, Park hyun bin – Daechan insaeng, Lee Eun mi – He e ji nun jung ip ni da, Byul – Drama lul bo myun, Maydany – molla ing, cheumcherum, ID

2010 2010 Musical 'Seo Pyeon je' every song composition and arrangement, Yoari's 'Jeogiyo'produced - Korea's first iPhone band formation and performance

2011 Lee ji young's 'O nul do' released, Kim bum so's 'Last love' released, 2011 The Musical awards composition department nominated(seopyeonje), Browneyedgirls's 'La bohem'released, MBC Drama 'Jigonun motsala OST – Dolawajoyo' released., 20th anniversary of Kim gun mo music 'The piano' announced.

== Career ==
1998 Founded NTN Entertainment

2002 Renamed IS Media

2003 NEGANETWORK Co., Ltd. Co-founder (Yoon il sang, LANCE)

== Awards ==
1996 SBS Best composer Award

1997 SBS Best composer Award

2000 Most hits song composer named since the last 10 years

2001 Kim bum so's 'Day (Hello. Goodbye. Hello) '51 of The Billboard Hot 100 Singles Sales chart entry

2006 PDIS <Hold The Line> Mobile Best song award

2007 The 15th Korea Popular Entertainer awards'New Generation composer'award

2009 Lee Eun Mi-'I have a lover' for two years Noraebang ranked No.1 song. ( Internet MR and feelTONG using survey result)

2010 Korea musical awards composer department nominated (sepyenje)

2011 Noraebang No.1 favorite song 'I have a lover'

2011 The musical awards. composer department nominated (sepyenje)

== Broadcasting activity ==
2011 'Akdong club' Judges

2007 'Muhan dojeon – Gangbyeonbukro song festival' composition and judges

2011 'I'm singer' consultant.

2011 'Birth of the great season2'Mento

2022 Riverside Song Festival New Challenge Judges

2023 Show King Night Judge

== Discography ==
- Yoo Jae Suk: Samba
- Kim Gun Mo: One Flew Bird Over the Cuckoo's Nest, Budamsori, Crying
- Kim Bum-soo: Bogosipda (I Miss you), You Leave Me, Appear, Last love, One Day
- DJ DOC: Beauty and Beast(OK?OK!), Winter Story, Remember
- Park Ji-yoon: "I Don't Know Anything" (1999), "Steal Away", "Go Away"
- Shin Seung-hun: What Should I Do
- Young Turks Club: JUNG, TA-IN
- YB: I Will Forget
- Lee Moon Se: Unknown life
- Lee Seung-cheol: Even today I, Fate
- Lee Eun Mi: I Have A Lover, Being Break Up, Nocturne, Sinner
- Lee Jung-hyun: Jul-lae, Crazy, Dal-a Dla-a, Summer Dance
- Lee Yoon Jung: Seduce
- Sechs Kies: Hunch, Reckless Love, Betrayal, Beauty Deportation, Taming of the Shrew
- Cho PD: La La Land (feat. JeA and Narsha)
- Cool: "Woman on the Beach" (Korean: "해변의 여인"), "Destiny", "Bogo Bogo", "Jumpo Mambo", "Truth", "Sorrow"
- Turbo: Love is, Cyber Love, X, Remembrance,
- As One: For You Not To Know
- Brown Eyed Girls: Oasis, Love Action, Hold the Line, La Boheme, You Can't Go, Good Fellas
- Ga-in: Irreversible
- JK Kim Dong Uk: Today, I Will Love You
- PDIS: I Love You (Feat Joo hyun mi), Attractive (Feat. Maydoni)
- S♯arp: Could I
- T: Unforgettable, Tuesday
- UN: Waves
- 2012: "Welcome" from Shinhwa's 10th album The Return
