= Basic (Brown Eyed Girls album) =

Studio album by Brown Eyed Girls
- Released: November 5, 2015
- Genres: K-pop; dance-pop; electropop
- Language: Korean
- Labels: APOP; LOEN

Brown Eyed Girls chronology
Black Box (2013)	Basic (2015)	Revive (2019)

Singles from Basic
- 1. "Warm Hole" Released: November 4, 2015; 2. "Brave New World" Released: November 4, 2015

Basic is the sixth studio album by South Korean girl group Brown Eyed Girls, their first under their new label APOP Entertainment. It was released on November 5, 2015.

== Reception ==
Basic was well-received critically, being praised by Billboard as "perfecting their [Brown Eyed Girls'] provocative formula".

== Track listing ==
No.	Title	Lyrics	Music	Length
1.	"Time of Ice Cream" (아이스크림의 시간; aiseukeurimui shigan)	Kim Eana; Miryo	Primary; Shin Soo-ran	3:57
2.	"Warm Hole" (웜홀; Wormhole)	Kim Eana	Park Geun-tae; Lee Sang-ho; Seo Yong-bae; Sigurd Rosnes; Lola Delon	3:12
3.	"Wave"	Kim Eana; Miryo	Jeong Seok-won	3:28
4.	"Brave New World" (신세계; shinsegye)	Kim Eana; Miryo	Lee Min-soo	4:01
5.	"Obsession"	Echo Bridge; Miryo	Echo Bridge	3:39
6.	"Higgs" (신의 입자; sinui ibja)	D'Day; Miryo	KZ; Lucky.D	3:15
7.	"Light"	TEXU; Miryo	JeA; TEXU	3:17
8.	"Atomic"	G. Gorilla; Miryo	G. Gorilla	4:01
9.	"Dice Play" (주사위 놀이; jusawi nori)	D'Day; Miryo	Junjaman; KZ	3:43
10.	"Fractal"	Lee Mi-sung; Miryo	JeA; TEXU	3:35
