= Revival, Jamaica =

Revival
- Location within Jamaica
- Coordinates: 18°13′35.34″N 78°17′04.80″W
- Country: Jamaica
- County: Cornwall
- Parish: Westmoreland
- Time zone: UTC-5 (EST)

Revival is a small settlement, around 15 kilometers from Negril. The area is wooded and mostly in a natural state. Revival is located on the southwestern coast of Jamaica in Westmoreland Parish.
