= Reviver =

Reviver or Revivor may refer to:

- Reviver, 1987 video game by Arsys Software
- Reviver, 2006 album by Pat the White
- Reviver, 2009 EP by Abe Vigoda
- Reviver, 2012 album by Callers
- Revivor, 2003 album by Funker Vogt
- "Reviver", 2010 song by 36 Crazyfists
- Reviver, 2022 album by Lane 8
