= Miryo =

South Korean rapper

Miryo 조미혜
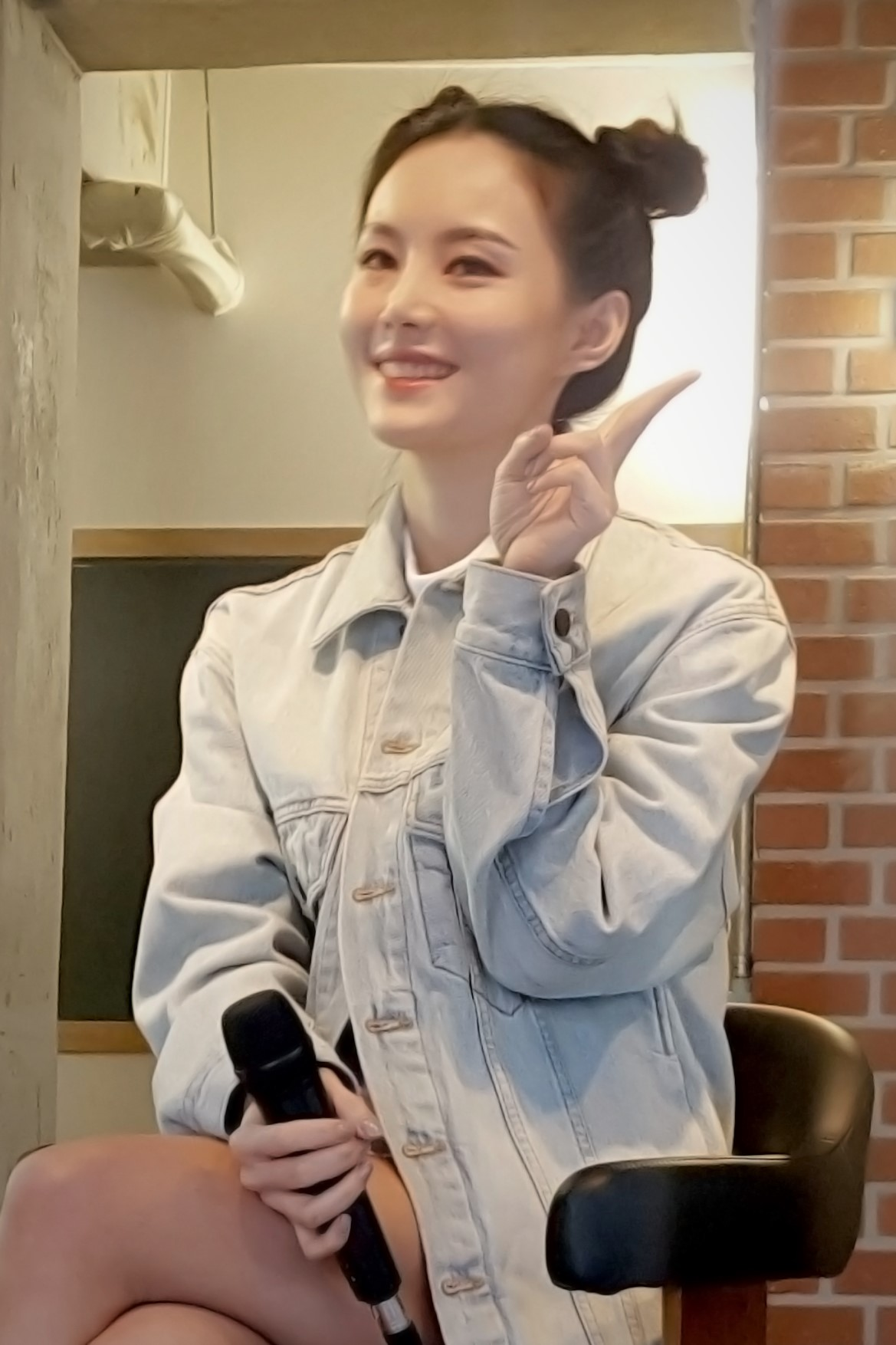
- Miryo in 2018

Background information
- Also known as: JoHoney
- Born: Jo Mi-hye; November 2, 1981 (age 45); Sunchon, South Korea
- Genres: K-rap; hip-hop
- Occupations: Rapper; songwriter
- Years active: 2000–present
- Label: APOP
- Member of: Brown Eyed Girls
- Formerly of: Honey Family

- Korean name
- Hangul: 조미혜
- Hanja: 趙美惠
- RR: Jo Mihye
- MR: Cho Mihye

Jo Mi-hye (born November 2, 1981), better known by her stage name Miryo (Korean: 미료), is a South Korean rapper and songwriter. She is currently the rapper of girl group Brown Eyed Girls, and is a former member of rap group Honey Family. Miryo debuted as a soloist in 2012, after appearing as a producer in the first season of Show Me the Money.

== Early life ==
In her interview with rapper/YouTuber Grace Kim, she revealed that she started off as a singer, where her mother is a music teacher, with a habit of playing classical music in the morning, which influenced her to sing since she was 5 all the way through junior high and high school, until she left home at 17 and went all the way to Daehangno, Seoul, and became a hip-hop dancer and rapper instead, before dropping out of high school, and joined a Canadian college in the hip hop club.

== Career ==
Miryo began her music career in 2000, when she featured on a song by underground hip-hop group Honey Family. She joined the group as the main female rapper the following year and participated in their second album. After the team disbanded, she featured in other hip-hop artists' songs, such as former groupmate Gil Seong-joon from Leessang, and MC Mong. Soon after, Miryo received and accepted an offer from singer JeA to join Brown Eyed Girls. She became the rapper of the group, which debuted with an album entitled "Your Story" in March 2006. Brown Eyed Girls eventually achieved mainstream success in 2009 with their hit song "Abracadabra", which was followed up by their equally acclaimed song "Sixth Sense" in 2011.

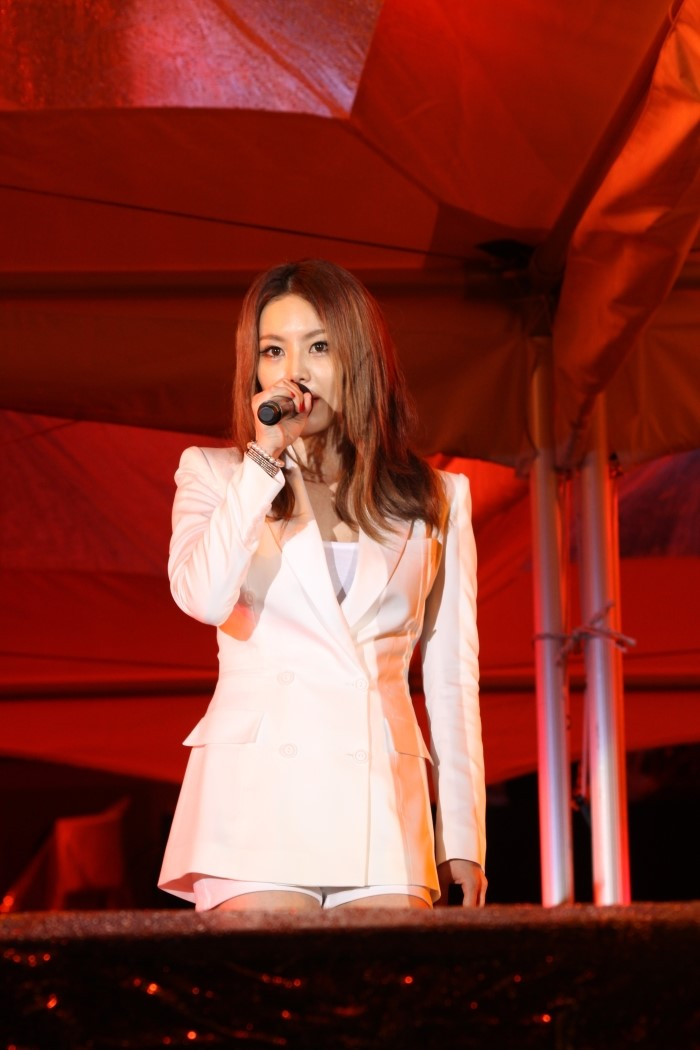
Miryo performing in 2012

In 2012, Miryo appeared as a producer on the rap competition TV show Show Me the Money, and was the only female judge. During the show she mentored Cheetah, who went on to win the first season of Unpretty Rapstar three years later. After her appearance on Show Me the Money, she made her solo debut with the self-produced album "MIRYO a.k.a. JOHONEY". The album featured a variety of artists who ranged from idols to hip hop heavyweights. Brown Eyed Girls returned with their fifth studio album Black Box in July 2013, and promoted the title song Kill Bill. In November of that year, Miryo and fellow Brown Eyed Girls member Narsha formed a subunit called M&N. The subunit released their first single, entitled "Tonight", on November 11.

Miryo released her single album "Queen" in July 2015, with the title song featuring her groupmate Ga-In. In September of that year, she and the other members of Brown Eyed Girls left their agency Nega Network. The group signed with Mystic Entertainment in October and released their album Basic the next month.

=== Songwriting ===
Miryo is also a songwriter. She has been a composer and lyricist for Honey Family and also her current group Brown Eyed Girls.

== Discography ==
=== Extended plays ===
Title	Album details	Peak chart positions	Sales
Title	Album details	KOR	Sales
MIRYO a.k.a. JOHONEY	Released: February 1, 2012; Label: Nega Network, Neowiz Bugs; Format: CD, digital download; Track listing: 01. "Party Rock" (feat. Gary of Leessang, THE KOXX); 02. "Dirty"; 03. "I Love You, I Love You" (feat. Sunny of Girls' Generation) (사랑해 사랑해); 04. "Revenger" (feat. Rude Paper); 05. "Leggo" (feat. Narsha of Brown Eyed Girls)	—	—N/a
"—" denotes release did not chart.

=== Singles ===
Title	Year	Peak chart positions		Album
Title	Year	KOR Gaon	KOR Billboard	Album
"Ready To L.O.V.E" with JeA	2008	No data	No data	Non-album singles
"Shall We Get Married?" (우리 결혼할까?) with Lisa	2010	11	No data	Non-album singles
"After the Bus Left" (버스가 떠난 뒤에) with K.Will	2010	14	No data	Non-album singles
"Dirty"	2012	8	7	MIRYO a.k.a. JOHONEY
"Queen" feat. Gain	2015	98	No data	Non-album single
"Climax" with Jura, Lee Sang-gon, No. 11	2016	—	No data	Honey Family BeeHive Project Vol. 3
"Rock Paper Scissors" (가위 바위 보) with Giant Pink	2016	—	No data	Non-album singles
"King of the Hill" with Maniac	2017	—	No data	Non-album singles
"Freedom" feat. Killagramz	2017	—	—	Dreams single album
"Can I See You Again"	2018	—	—	Come single album
"Yellow"	2018	—	—	True single album
"—" denotes release did not chart.

=== Other charted songs ===
Title	Year	Peak chart positions		Album
Title	Year	KOR Gaon	KOR Billboard	Album
"Love Is" with JeA	2010	18	No data	Blue Brand Trauma
"Party Rock" feat. Gary of Leessang, The Koxx	2012	34	34	MIRYO a.k.a. JOHONEY
"I Love You, I Love You" (사랑해 사랑해) feat. Sunny of Girls' Generation	2012	56	51	MIRYO a.k.a. JOHONEY
"Leggo" feat. Narsha	2012	78	79	MIRYO a.k.a. JOHONEY
"Ain't Got Nobody" feat. Dean	2016	71	No data	Unpretty Rapstar 3

== Filmography ==
=== Variety shows ===
Year	Title	Notes
2012	Show Me the Money	Judge
2015	Hello Counselor	with Brown Eyed Girls
2016	Unpretty Rapstar 3	Contestant
