= Brown Eyed Girls =

South Korean girl group

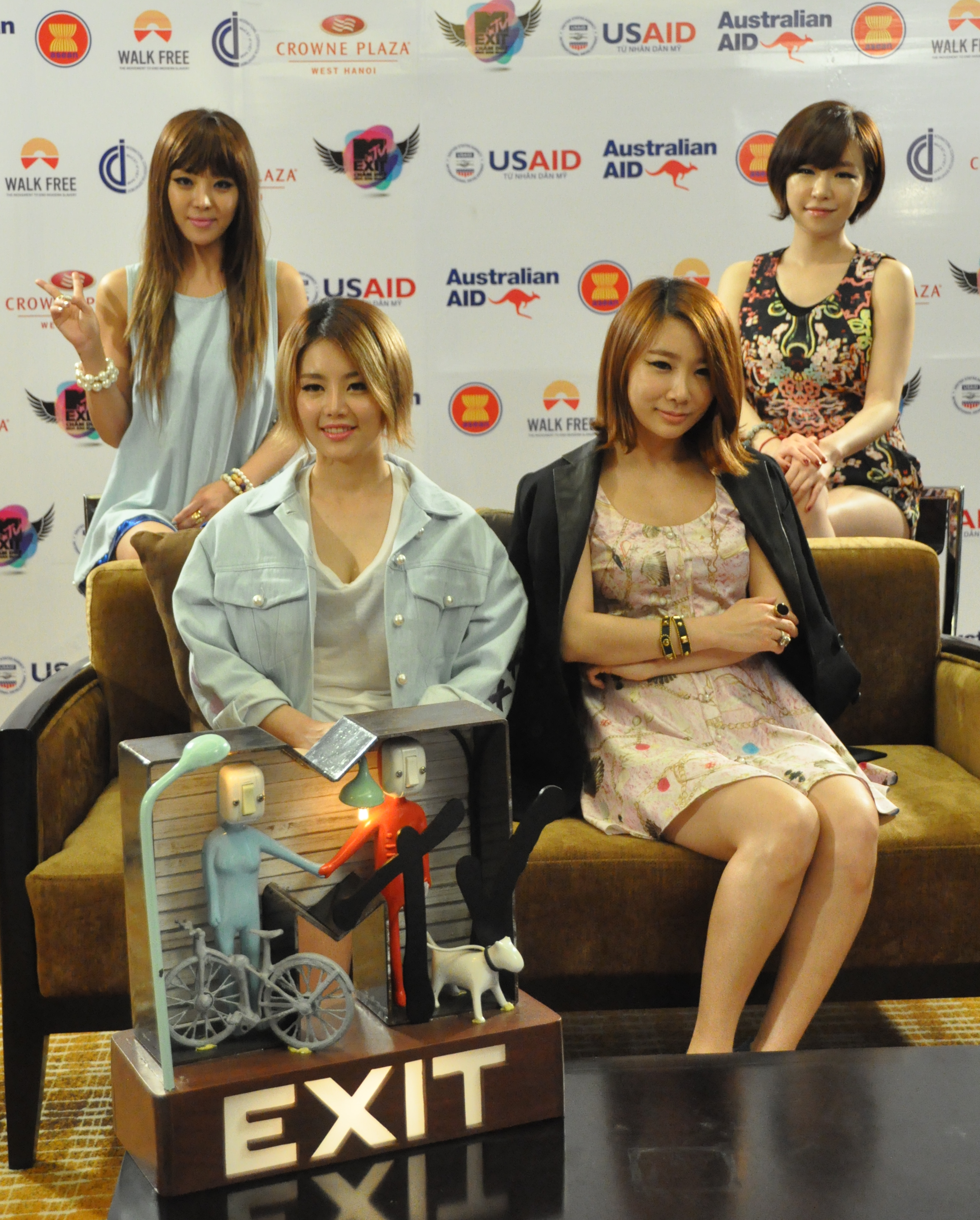
- Brown Eyed Girls in May 2012. From left to right: Narsha, Miryo, JeA and Ga-In

Background information
- Origin: Seoul, South Korea
- Genres: K-pop; R&B; dance-pop
- Years active: 2006–2015; 2019–2020
- Labels: Nega Network; APOP
- Members: JeA; Miryo; Narsha; Gain

Brown Eyed Girls (Korean: 브라운 아이드 걸스; Japanese: ブラウン・アイド・ガールズ) are a South Korean girl group. The group is composed of four members: JeA, Miryo, Narsha, and Gain. They debuted as an R&B/ballad vocal group with "Come Closer (다가와서)" in 2006 through the release of their debut album Your Story.

They rose to popularity in 2008 with "L.O.V.E" and their retro-dance number "How Come" and cemented their position in the K-pop world in 2009 with "Abracadabra", with its electronica-based genre, pioneering (albeit controversial) concept, along with its iconic and now globally recognized dance entitled 'The Arrogant Dance (시건방춤)'—successfully ingraining themselves into modern popular culture.

The group started their venture into the Japanese music market with the release of a Japanese version of their massively successful 3rd Korean album, Sound-G, in late 2010, with full promotions being held throughout early 2011 under Sony Music Japan, where they gained moderate success. They returned to Korea in late 2011, to garner further success and critical acclaim with their fourth album and its lead single "Sixth Sense". Other than promoting as a group, all of the members have released solo albums.

== Career ==
=== 2006: Formation and early years ===
JeA was responsible for the group's creation and was actively involved in the selection of the other members, choosing Miryo, who was active as a member of hip-hop group Honey Family. Narsha was chosen when JeA remembered her as a "talented singer" from her school days, and Ga-in was selected by the three members after she was eliminated from the reality competition series Let's Coke Play! Battle Shinhwa!. They performed several small-scale concerts before making their debut, and were tentatively called "Crescendo" and "Dark Angel".

On March 2, 2006, after three years of formal training, Brown Eyed Girls released their debut album Your Story, simultaneously with its lead single "Come Closer". Debuting as a "faceless group" they did not appear on any visual media and chose to not even appear in their own music video. Though the album was not a commercial success it was later re-released to include "Hold The Line". This song became a hit, further boosting the band's popularity. "Hold the Line" was disclosed across the world because it was included in the list of songs from the game Pump It Up.

After a short break, the group went back into the studio to work on their second album Leave Ms. Kim (떠나라 미스김), which included their R&B single "You Got Me Fooled" (너에게 속았다). Subsequent singles were "Oasis" (오아시스) featuring Lee Jae Hoon and "It's Mine" (내꺼야), a collaboration with fellow group SeeYa. During the break between their debut and second albums, Brown Eyed Girls released their first digital single entitled "I Am a Summer" (내가 여름이다), which was later included in their second LP.

The first two albums contained typical R&B ballads which had been very popular in the K-pop scene. However, their commercial success was relatively higher with the two singles between the first and second albums. Moreover, the second album containing "You Got Me Fooled" (너에게 속았다) was released at nearly the same time as Wonder Girls' "Tell Me" which was a nationwide success in Korea. Therefore, their second album was once again a commercial disappointment. At the same time, the general K-pop scene was changing from R&B ballads to dance music.

=== 2008: With L.O.V.E. and My Style mini albums ===
In January 2008, Brown Eyed Girls came back with their first mini-album "With L.O.V.E." Their single, "L.O.V.E", was a departure from the B.E.G. sound that people had come to know but it became an instant success. With it, Brown Eyed Girls scored their first No. 1 song and also one of the top hit songs in the first half of 2008. "Love Action" was the second single taken from the mini album. With L.O.V.E. also marked the group's second digital album (after "I Am a Summer"), though it was released in conventional CD format as well. After the release of their first mini-album, they achieved commercial success. "L.O.V.E" was composed by Saint-Binary and Min-Soo Lee.

Looking to strengthen their success, Brown Eyed Girls returned again in September and released their second mini-album My Style. The title song "How Come" was a retro-style dance song that took advantage of the growing popularity of dance music.

=== 2009–2010: Sound G, Japanese debut and solo activities ===
On July 20, 2009, Brown Eyed Girls released their third full-length album, the double-disc Sound G. Even though "Candy Man" was the first song unveiled from the album, the first heavily promoted single was "Abracadabra," which was composed by Ji-nu and Lee Min-soo. The release of this album also saw a shift in the image of the group, as the members redefined themselves as independent and mature city girls. The music video for the lead single sparked controversy. As the group sported a substantially more provocative style, criticism arose over the suggestive and erotic themes that the video presented. They later released a "stage version" of the video, which focused only on the choreography. Nevertheless, even with all the controversies they took the Kpop world by storm, snagging awards at music shows and year end music awards. The sexy hip dance featured in the music video became a national fad, with fellow celebrities frequently parodying it.

The group next released the repackaged edition album entitled Sign that included the lead single of the same name, with "Drunk On Sleep," and a remix of "Abracadabra." The quartet had been readying for their Japan debut since signing with major record label Sony Music Japan International. In August 2010, the group re-released Sound G in Japanese, which marked the beginning of their Japanese promotions. After the success of the album, the members concentrated more on their individual activities, juggling them with their overseas schedules. In July, Narsha released her first solo albumNARSHA to certain success, In August, JeA collaborated with Rattpoom, a Thai singer, on his song "Face to Face". Later in October, Gain also started solo activities with her debut album Step 2/4 which featured a strong interpolation of tango music, featuring "Irreversible" as the lead single. On October 31, she had her first win (Mutizen song) on Inkigayo. In December, JeA released a ballad single "Because You Sting" featuring G.O. of MBLAQ.

Aside from their group and solo activities, Brown Eyed Girls also took part in variety shows and sitcoms. Ga-in appeared on We Got Married with 2AM's Jo Kwon beginning in September 2009. The couple was very popular in Korea and still is one of the most recognized virtual couples in the country. Their virtual marriage came to an end after 15 months in January 2011. She made her acting debut as the female lead Gaumji in the MBC daily sitcom All My Love. However, owing to scheduling conflicts, her role in the sitcom ended in May 2011. Narsha has appeared on Invincible Youth (also known as G7) since October 2009. She is known on the show as "Sung In Dol" (Adult idol) due to her age difference with the other cast members and her funny, but naughty reactions on the show. She was also one of the fixed cast members in SBS's variety show Heroes. In April 2010, she DJed on Volume Up on KBS Cool FM. Due to Brown Eyed Girls' overseas promotions Narsha decided to leave the show, with her last broadcast on December 28, 2010. The group ended the year with a concert entitled "Hot Winter Party" held in the Ax-Korea Hall in Seoul.

=== 2011: Japanese promotions and return to Korea with Sixth Sense ===
On January 17, 2011, the group released a Japanese music video for "Sign". The group started their promotions in Japan in early 2011. Brown Eyed Girls originally planned to hold a concert in Japan in April but due to the Tōhoku earthquake in March, the concert was postponed to September instead. The band's first Japanese concert at C.C Lemon Hall in Shibuya took place on September 12. There, they unveiled one of the songs from their fourth album An Inconvenient Truth, which was composed by JeA and KZ. On September 6, NegaNetwork released an official comeback date, marking the end of their two-year hiatus. The group was expected to release the single "Hot Shot" on September 16, followed by their fourth album and music video Sixth Sense on September 23.

Representatives of their agency, NegaNetwork, stated that the concept for this album was to be “freedom of expression through music experienced via the sixth sense".

This album focuses not only on their singing and performance. The members hope to convey their thoughts to the public through music. Their title track is an expression of the limitations of experiencing music with only five senses, and it asks people to feel it instead with their sixth sense. The song itself is very free in style.

They kicked off their promotional cycle officially with a double stage performance of "Hot Shot" and "Sixth Sense" on September 24 on Music Core. and grabbed the top spot on M! Countdown and Inkigayo. They also broke the jinx of going into a slump after a big hit, as the release was even more popular and received higher digital sales than their famed song "Abracadabra". The band concluded their promotions for "Sixth Sense" after a month, but immediately followed it with the release of a repackage of their fourth studio album. On November 4, Brown Eyed Girls released their repackaged album and followed up promotions for it with their ballad song 'Cleansing Cream'. They officially concluded their promotional activities on November 18 with a final performance on KBS's Music Bank.

=== 2012: Solo activities, digital single and Tonight 37.2 °C ===
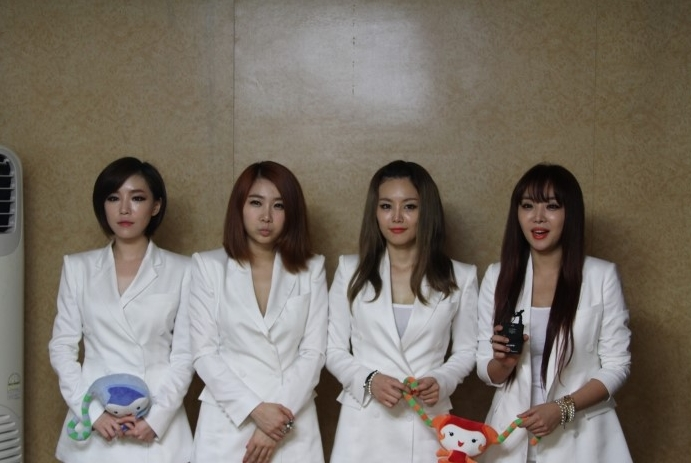
Brown Eyed Girls at the 2012 Yeosu Expo

The members branched out to solo activities once again. Starting with Miryo, releasing her self- produced solo album, MIRYO a.k.a. JOHONEY on February 1. She had a rocky start with two of the songs from her album banned in broadcasting stations. Namely, “Revenger,” which according to SBS officials has lyrics depicting violence and the lead single "Dirty" for the lyrics of the song, containing the word, “cross-eyed” which could be perceived as a derogatory term for the disabled thus forcing Miryo to change the lyrics to be able to perform on music shows.

On TV, Narsha made her acting debut with MBC's drama Light and Shadow playing the role of an aspiring singer Lee Jung Ja and followed by Ooh La La Couple as a goddess. The other members participated on reality programs. Gain became a CEO of a public relations company called ‘Mental Breakdown' particularly for the show, OnStyle's Launch My Life – Ga In's Fashion King. Miryo was cast for Mnet's hip-hop program Show Me the Money, collaborating with a rookie rapper to compete against other contestants for the top spot. JeA also became a fixed member of Immortal Songs 2, but she later left the show due to her solo album promotions and was replaced by Narsha which later on left the show also due to her musical When A Man Loves.

On July 17, Brown Eyed Girls released their digital single "The Original" of the hybrid soul genre – the genre the girls originally debuted with. It has two tracks, "Come with Me" and the single "A Midsummer Night's Dream", intended to be a gift to fans who were still supporting the group despite it not being active. It was produced and composed by JeA. No promotional activities were done. Gain released her second mini-album on October 5 Talk About S with the lead single "Bloom". The song won the top spot on M! Countdown. JeA also pre-released the track "Let's Hug" on December 28 from her upcoming solo album. Before the year ended, fans of Brown Eyed Girls were finally able to see all four members up on stage together once again for their 19+ Rated ‘Tonight 37.2 °C‘ concert.

=== 2013: Black Box and sub-unit M&N ===
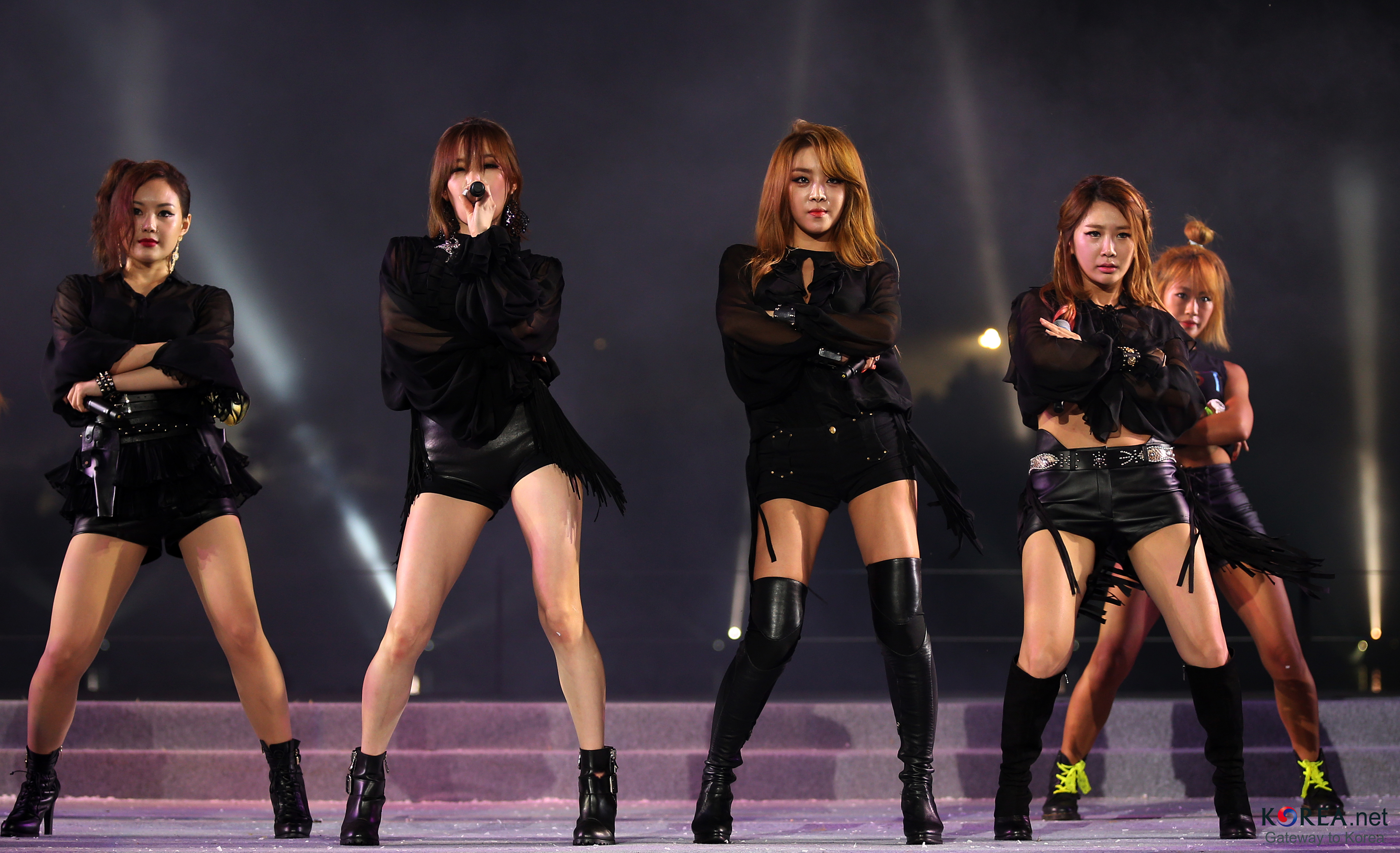
Brown Eyed Girls performing in 2013 at the World Rowing Championship Event

Member JeA started the year by releasing her solo album "Just JeA," showing her prowess as a vocalist and also a producer. Gain also surprised everyone by releasing a duet album on April 7 with label-mate Cho Hyung Woo, titled "Romantic Spring." The album contains warm, beautiful love songs that perfectly fit the season. On July 4, a teaser image was released via Facebook and Twitter for Brown Eyed Girls' long-awaited comeback. July 9 marked the release of a digital-single: "Recipe" (레시피). Renowned Korean hip hop producer Primary produced the track "Recipe", which served as a pre-release to the upcoming album, with Miryo and Dynamic Duo's Choiza writing the lyrics for the song.

After the positive reception of their digital single from the public, they continued by releasing their 5th studio album, Black Box, on July 29, with "Kill Bill" being announced as the main single, being composed by Lee Gyu Hyun and member JeA. The music video teaser for "Kill Bill" was released on July 25, with the actual music video being revealed later, on July 28, followed by a special dance version on August 2. They performed their comeback stage on Inkigayo on July 28, as the opening act for the episode, performing pre-release single "Recipe (레시피)" before their album title-track later in the show. They continued their promotions for the album throughout various music programmes (with the exception of KBS-run programmes for undisclosed reasons) until August 25 where they brought them to a close. Youngest member Gain also revealed in an interview that she will release another solo album after promotion for "Kill Bill".

In October 2013, Ga-In also broke onto the C-pop scene, featuring in Show Lo's music video for "愛投羅網" (Cast The Net Of Love). On November 4, multiple sources in the entertainment field revealed that Miryo and Narsha will be forming a sub-unit and plan on releasing music for the unit in mid-November. While Brown Eyed Girls members have been well known to venture into solo activities, this is the first time in which two members will be working together as one team. On November 11, M&N released their first single, titled "Tonight (오늘밤)," which included two versions of the same track (one Korean, one English version), with the lyrical content to the first version being self-composed between the two members - on a later date during an interview, both members of the sub-unit stated that they had plans to release an album sometime within the next year, with it to feature a strong Hip Hop sound complete with promotional activities.

=== 2014: Special Moments compilation album ===
At the end of January 2014, Gain was revealed to be making a comeback with her 3rd mini album Truth or Dare on February 6, releasing a teaser picture along with the news. On January 22 she released a "mysterious and sexy" teaser still-cut from her pre-release track "Fxxk U". She later released a controversial teaser for the song showing two silhouettes behind a shower curtain and Gain saying "Fuck you." Information released with the teaser said the song would feature singer Bumkey and be "simple yet melodious" and feature a classical guitar. The song and music video were released on January 27. The music video portrayed Gain and actor Joo Ji Hoon in a physically and emotionally abusive relationship. The song was created by lyricist Kim Eana and composer Lee Minsoo (who also worked with Gain on her previous solo single "Bloom"). The title song "Truth or Dare" deals with the topic of rumors and their effect on celebrities and their life.

On August 6 it was announced that the group would be releasing a "greatest hits" album titled Special Moments, featuring several songs from the group's eight-year career, as well as a new track "Hush", which would serve as the lead single from the album. Special Moments has a two-disc format, with the first disc featuring the group's lead singles and promotional tracks, and the second disc focusing mainly on their ballad tracks. The album was released on August 11, 2014.

=== 2015: Departure from Nega Network, contract with Mystic Entertainment and Basic ===
On September 4, 2015, members JeA, Narsha, and Miryo became free agents after deciding not to renew their contracts with Nega Network. On October 1, 2015, all members have signed with Mystic Entertainment. On October 26, Mystic released the first batch of teaser pictures through Brown Eyed Girls's official Twitter account. Each girl was shown posing in a desert like landscape, while the concept gave off a futuristic and science fiction feeling. Simultaneously they announced the release date of their upcoming 6th studio album, Basic, which was November 5 at midnight. Another batch of teaser pictures was released a day later on October 27. The track list was released on October 28 and revealed ten brand new tracks, with "Brave New World" (신세계) being the lead single and "Warm Hole" (웜홀) the second single. Moreover, JeA and Miryo took part in the writing and composing several songs of the album. "Brave New World" was written by Kim Eana and composed by Lee Minsoo, who had also worked together on previous Brown Eyed Girls songs.

The group appeared on the smartphone broadcast V App on the 29th where they stated that "Brave New World" had a choreography-heavy video but that they could not actually reveal any more info about the album. During the course of the next few days they revealed teaser videos for the album tracks, such as "Ice Cream Time", "Obsession", and "Wave". The teaser videos for the two singles "Warm Hole" and "Brave New World" were the last to be released. The girls held their first showcase of their careers called 'Comeback to the Basic' on November 4 where they also performed the track "Time of Ice Cream". Youngest member Gain revealed during the showcase that she took part in choreographing "Warm Hole" and "Brave New World", as well as forming the concept for their sixth album.

The album and the music video for Brave New World were released on the same day. They reference the futuristic theme of Aldous Huxley's novel Brave New World through the depiction of time traveling in the music video as well as the idea of a dystopian state through the lyrics, although the theme of music video and song do not refer to the novel's themes of materialism and discouragement of critical thinking. The music video for "Warm Hole" was released on November 5 and sparked a controversy due to the heavy sexual lyrics and references in the MV to a female's reproductive organ, but the group still performed "Warm Hole" on the November 5 episode of M! Countdown on November 5 and the November 6 episode of Music Bank.

=== 2016–present: Hiatus, 10th anniversary, Narsha's departure from APOP Entertainment, RE_vive ===
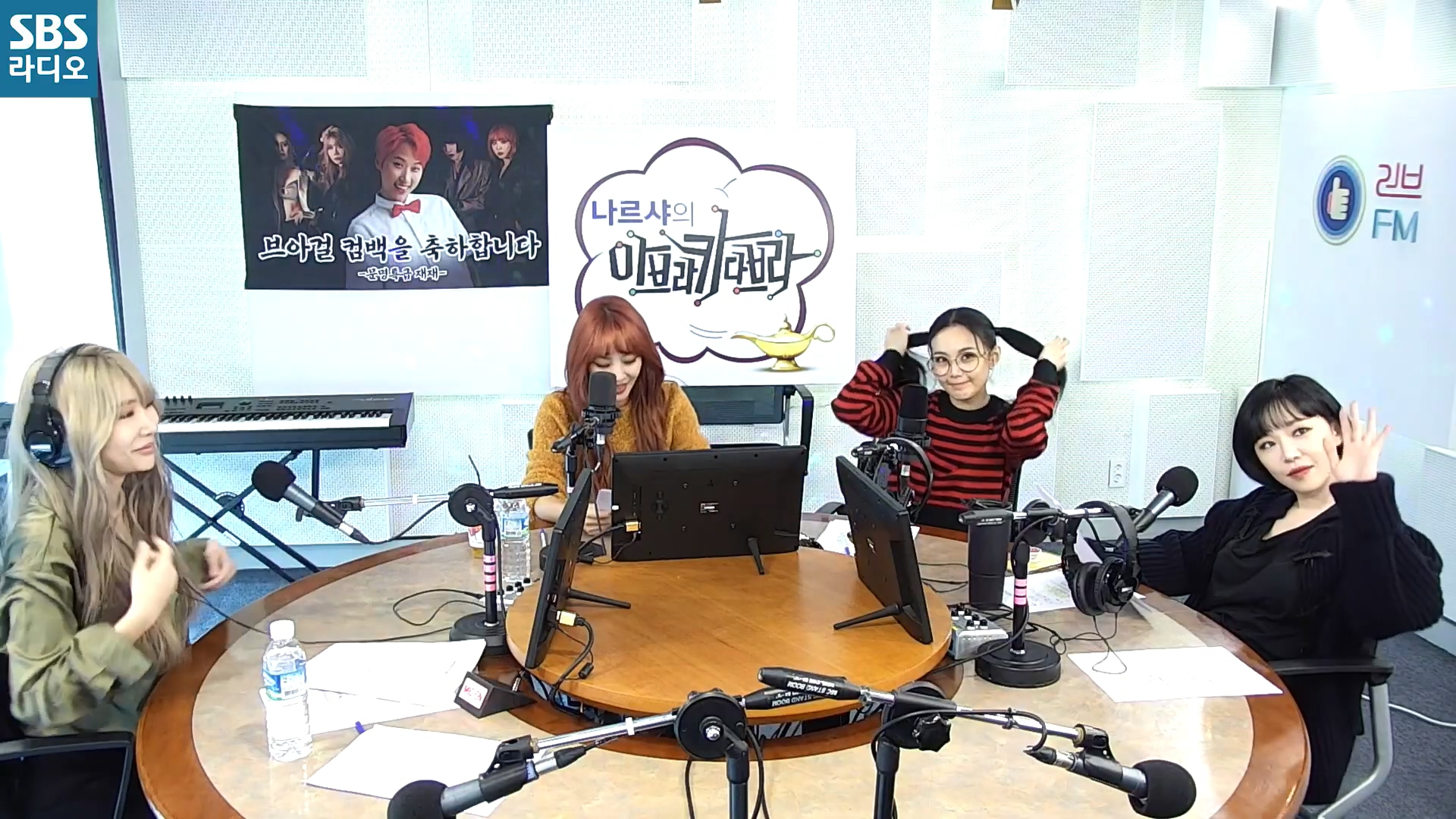
Brown Eyed Girls at a radio show in 2019

In 2016, it was reported that Brown Eyed Girls were the first K-pop girl group without any member changes for 10 years. For their 10th anniversary, the group held a concert with Kero One and KRNFX on March 18 at the Feria (now known as Club Bound LA) in Koreatown, Los Angeles, CA.

On December 14, 2018, it was announced that Narsha would be leaving Mystic Story and APOP Entertainment. However, she would continue to promote with Brown Eyed Girls in future activities. The statement also revealed the group was preparing for a new comeback.

In September 2019, the group set up an official Instagram, where they announced their new album RE_vive released on October 28.

== Other musical efforts ==
The group members have also been featured on several South Korean drama soundtracks including The Vineyard Man ("Loving You"), Queen of the Game ("Poisonous Love"), Dae Jo-yeong ("Dae Jo-yeong"), The Kingdom of the Winds ("A lot of love"), My Fair Lady ("I Love You"), and The Slave Hunters ("Stray Child"). JeA also participated in OST songs even before Brown Eyed Girls' debut. Also, Miryo and JeA collaborated for the single "Love Is..." which was released in May 2010. They collaborated with 4Minute in 2010 for a World Cup song. Ga-in also participated in "4Tomorrow Project" with Kara's Seung-yeon, After School's Uee, and 4Minute's Hyuna. She also released the digital single "I Happen to Love You", composed by JeA, with then We Got Married partner Jo Kwon from 2AM. The song was voted No. 1 in several music programs in January 2010.

In 2011, Miryo and Sunny of Girls' Generation collaborated for the single "I Love You, I Love You", which was released the same year. Ga-in collaborated with Park Jin-young for the song "Someone Else" shortly before his comeback. The music video and the full-length song were pre-released in April 2012. On April 13, 2013, Psy released a music video for his single "Gentleman", which featured dance moves heavily inspired by the "Abracadabra" music video, as well as featuring Ga-in in the video. Ga-in was featured in IU's "Everyone Has Secrets" from her album Modern Times released in October 2013.

== Discography ==
- Your Story (2006)
- Leave Ms. Kim (2007)
- Sound-G (2009)
- Sixth Sense (2011)
- Black Box (2013)
- Basic (2015)
- RE_Vive (2019)

== Awards and nominations ==
Name of the award ceremony, year presented, category, nominee(s) of the award, and the result of the nomination
Award ceremony	Year	Category	Nominee / work	Result	Ref.
Cyworld Digital Music Awards	2006	Song of the Month (July)	"Hold The Line"	Won	
Cyworld Digital Music Awards	2009	Song of the Month (August)	"Abracadabra"	Won	
Cyworld Digital Music Awards	2010	Bonsang	"Abracadabra"	Won	
Cyworld Digital Music Awards	2010	Song of the Year	"Abracadabra"	Nominated	
Cyworld Digital Music Awards	2010	Artist of the Year	Brown Eyed Girls	Nominated	
Golden Disc Awards	2008	Digital Bonsang	"L.O.V.E"	Won	
Golden Disc Awards	2008	Digital Daesang	"L.O.V.E"	Nominated	
Golden Disc Awards	2009	Disk Bonsang	Sound-G	Nominated	
Golden Disc Awards	2009	Digital Music Bonsang	"Abracadabra"	Nominated	
Golden Disc Awards	2012	Popularity Award	Brown Eyed Girls	Nominated	
Korean Music Awards	2010	Best Dance & Electronic Album	Sound-G	Won	
Korean Music Awards	2010	Best Dance & Electronic Song	"Abracadabra"	Won	
Melon Music Awards	2009	Top 10 Artists	Brown Eyed Girls	Won	
Mnet Asian Music Awards	2006	Mnet Asian Music Award for Best New Group of the Year	Brown Eyed Girls	Nominated	
Mnet Asian Music Awards	2007	Mnet Asian Music Award for Best Female Group	Brown Eyed Girls	Nominated	
Mnet Asian Music Awards	2008	Mnet Asian Music Award for Best Female Group	Brown Eyed Girls	Nominated	
Mnet Asian Music Awards	2008	Best House & Electronic	"Love"	Nominated	
Mnet Asian Music Awards	2009	Mnet Asian Music Award for Best Female Group	Brown Eyed Girls	Won	
Mnet Asian Music Awards	2009	Best House & Electronic	"Abracadabra"	Won	
Mnet Asian Music Awards	2011	Best Female Group	Brown Eyed Girls	Nominated	
Mnet Asian Music Awards	2011	Mnet Asian Music Award for Best Music Video	"Sixth Sense"	Nominated	
Seoul Music Awards	2006	New Artist Award	Brown Eyed Girls	Won	
Seoul Music Awards	2009	Bonsang	Brown Eyed Girls	Won	
Seoul Music Awards	2009	Popularity Award	Brown Eyed Girls	Nominated	
Seoul Music Awards	2009	Daesang Award	Brown Eyed Girls	Nominated	
Seoul Music Awards	2010	Bonsang	Brown Eyed Girls	Won	
Seoul Music Awards	2010	Popularity Award	Brown Eyed Girls	Nominated	
Seoul Music Awards	2010	Daesang Award	Brown Eyed Girls	Nominated	
