= Nega Network =

South Korean record label

- Industry: Music; entertainment
- Genre: Pop; dance; electronica; R&B; K-pop
- Founded: January 2003
- Founder: Yoon Il-sang; Lance Yoon-suk Choi; Jo Young-chul
- Defunct: c. 2016
- Headquarters: Gangnam District, Seoul, South Korea
- Area served: South Korea
- Key people: Yoon Il-sang (chairman); Lance Choi (president)
- Products: Music; entertainment
- Services: Music; entertainment
- Divisions: i-Nega; Global H
- Website: neganetwork.com

Nega Network (Korean: 내가네트워크) was an independent South Korean record label, talent agency, producer, and publisher of pop music, founded by Yoon Il-sang, Lance Yoon-suk Choi and Jo Young-chul. It is based in Gangnam District, Seoul.

== History ==
Nega Network was founded by Yoon Il-sang, Lance Yoon-suk Choi and Jo Young-chul in January 2003.

Nega Network stopped updating their social media accounts in 2016 and later deleted their website.

== Artists ==
=== Groups ===
- Lunafly (hiatus)
- Littles

=== Producers ===
- Kim Eana (Lyricist, work with Kakao M)
- Yoon Il-sang (Composer)

== Former artists ==
- Brown Eyed Girls (2006–2015)
- EZ-Life
- iM
- Sunny Hill (2010–2011)
- Springkler
- PDIS (see Cho PD, Yoon Il Sang)
- May Doni
- LC9 (2013–2015)
- Laboum (moved to Interpark Music Plus) (Note: co-managed with Nega Network under joint venture GLOBAL H))
  - Yulhee (2014–2017)
  - Yujeong (2014–2021)
