= Kim Hyung-jun discography =

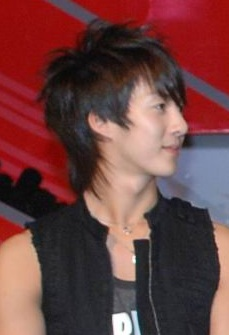
- Studio albums: 0
- EPs: 2
- Soundtrack albums: 10
- Singles: 9
- Video albums: 3
- Music videos: 6
- Promotional singles: 7

South Korean singer and the youngest member of SS501, Kim Hyung-jun has released two EPs, 10 singles, ten soundtrack contribution songs, four collaboration songs, and three DVDs.

During 2005–2010, Kim has had three solo songs from SS501 albums: "Sayonara Ga Dekinai" from Kokoro, "I Am" from U R Man album, and "Hey G" from SS501 Solo Collection. He also released two Korean singles entitled Men from Mars, Women from Venus and S-Wave 1st Present, and contributed "Lonely Girl" with Kim Kyu-jong from Bad Girl Diary OST.

On March 8, 2011, Kim released his debut solo mini album My Girl with music videos for the two lead tracks "oH! aH!" and "Girl". A Japanese version was released on April 6 with two bonus tracks of Japanese versions of the two lead tracks.

In July 2012, he released his second mini album entitled Escape with its single "Sorry, I'm Sorry". The album includes five songs, and a 25-minute drama MV starring Kang Ji-hwan, Lee Ki-woo, and himself. He, then, held his first solo live tour ‘2012 1st Story in Japan' in April and '2012 2nd Story in Japan' in August consecutively.

In February 2013, it was announced that Kim will be having his very first solo concert in Korea to commemorate his 2nd anniversary since his solo debut in 2011. Ticket sales were pre-released on February 12 Kim Hyung Jun "The First", the name of the concert, was held on March 9 at the Woori Art Hall at the Olympic Park, organized by SPLUS Entertainment and managed by SH Creative Works.

== Extended plays ==
Year	Title	Details	Peak positions		Sales and Certifications
Year	Title	Details	KOR	JPN	Sales and Certifications
Korean
2011	My Girl	Release Date: 8 March 2011; Label: S-Plus Entertainment; Format: Mini Album	1	37	KOR: 9,202
2012	Escape	Released: 9 July 2012; Label: S-Plus Entertainment; Format: Mini Album	5	16	KOR: 7,477
"—" denotes releases that did not chart or were not released in that region.

== Singles ==
Year	Title	Peak positions		Sales and certifications	Album
Year	Title	KOR	JPN	Sales and certifications	Album
Korean
2008	"I Am"	—	—		U R Man
2009	"Hey G"	—	—		SS501 Solo Collection
2011	"Girl"	32	—		My Girl
2011	"oH! aH!"	35	—		My Girl
2012	"Sorry, I'm Sorry"	—	—		Escape
2013	"Always Love You"	72	30		Non-album single
2015	"Cross the Line" (featuring Kebee)	—	—		
2015	"Be with You"	—	—		Be with You
2017	"Count On You" (PM 5: 기대)	—	—		AM to PM 5-11-3
Japanese
2007	"Sayonara Ga Dekinai" (さよならができない)	—	—		Kokoro (Limited Edition E, Kim Hyung-jun Ver.)
2011	"Long Night (眠れない夜)"	—	30		Non-album single
2014	"Better (ベター)"	—	38		Non-album single
2019	"Catch the Wave"	—	24	JPN: 3,936 (Phy.)	Non-album single
"—" denotes releases that did not chart or were not released in that region.

=== Promotional singles ===
Year	Title	Details	Peak positions		Album
Year	Title	Details	KOR	JPN	Album
2009	"Men from Mars, Women from Venus" ft. Miso	Released: 29 April 2009	—	—	Men from Mars, Women from Venus (화성남자 금성여자)
2009	"Secret Goldfish" (비밀 금붕어)	Released: 29 April 2009	—	—	Men from Mars, Women from Venus (화성남자 금성여자)
2009	"Tonight"	Released: 29 April 2009	—	—	Men from Mars, Women from Venus (화성남자 금성여자)
2010	"Girl"	Released: 22 December 2010	—	—	S-Wave 1st Present
2010	"Men from Mars, Women from Venus" ft. Miso	Released: 22 December 2010	—	—	S-Wave 1st Present
2012	"Beautiful World"	Singer: Various artists; campaign by Wisdomforfuture	—	—	If Love Earth, Take Action
2014	"Talk About Love"	Singer: Various artists; campaign by Wisdomforfuture	—	—	
"—" denotes releases that did not chart or were not released in that region.

=== As featured artist ===
Year	Title	Peak positions		Sales and Certifications	Album
Year	Title	KOR	JPN	Sales and Certifications	Album
2009	"Aotearoa" (Lee Han-chul, Sweet Sorrow, Jung Ji-young, Kim Hyung-jun)	—	—		Aotearoa (아오테아로아)
2009	"Love Train" (L.E.O. ft. Kim Hyung-jun)	—	—		L.E.O Vol. 2
2009	"Dynamite" (A'ST1 ft. Kim Hyung-jun)	—	—		A'ST1 1st Mini Album
"—" denotes releases that did not chart or were not released in that region.

== Soundtrack contributions ==
Year	Title	Peak positions		Album
Year	Title	KOR	JPN	Album
2009	"Lonely Girl" (악녀일기 리턴즈) - with Kim Kyu-jong	—	—	Bad Girl Diary OST
2010	"Love Is" with Kim So-jung	—	—	Cafe-in Musical OST
2011	"Midnight Passes" (이 밤이 지나가면)	—	—	Lie To Me OST
2011	"Indecisive" (갈팡질팡)	—	—	Hooray For Love OST
2012	"Sweet, Everyday" (달콤, Everyday)	—	—	My Shining Girl OST
2012	"Girl" (Space Cowboy Ver.)	—	—	My Shining Girl OST
2012	"Long Night" Korean Ver. (잠 못 드는 밤) - ft. Gil Mi	—	—	My Shining Girl OST
2012	"Heaven" (Acoustic Ver.)	—	—	My Shining Girl OST
2012	"사랑한단 말도"	—	—	Late Blossom OST
2012	"Sign"	—	—	Late Blossom OST
"—" denotes releases that did not chart or were not released in that region.

== Video albums ==
Year	Title	Details	Peak positions		Sales and Certifications	Track listing
Year	Title	Details	KOR	JPN	Sales and Certifications	Track listing
2011	Kim Hyung Jun Special Edition	Release Date: 11 November 2011 (Korea), 18 July 2012 (Japan); Format: 3DVD, 1CD, photobook; Length: 300 min. (DVDs); Event: Japan 1st Party in Tokyo (19 February 2011), Japan Live Tour (spring 2011 in Tokyo, Nagoya and Osaka)	—	—		Track listing DVDs Disc 1: Japan 1st Party in Tokyo (showcase) - 100 min.; Disc 2: Japan Live Tour - 100 min.; Disc 3: Music video and making of music video - 15 min.; Making of Japan 1st Party and Japan Live Tour - 50 min.; Promotional activities - 15 min.; Highlights from Korean showcase - 10 min.; Highlights from musical Cafe In - 10 min.; CD (Korea Edition) My Girl (repackaged album): 1. "Girl" [Space Cowboy Ver.]; 2. "oH! aH!" [E-Tribe Remix]; 3. "다른 여자 말고 너" (No Other Woman But You) [Space Cowboy Ver.]; 4. "Heaven" [Inst.]; 5. "잠 못 드는 밤" (Long Night) [Korean Ver.]; CD (Japan Edition) My Girl (repackaged Japan version album): 1. "Angel"; 2. "oH! aH!"; 3. "Girl"; 4. "Heaven"; 5. "다른 여자 말고 너" (No Other Woman But You); 6. "oH! aH!" [Japanese Ver.]; 7. "Girl" [Japanese Ver.]; 8. "Heaven" [Japanese Ver.]
2012	Kim Hyung Jun's Musical "Cafe In"	Release Date: 12 October 2012 (Japan); Format: 2DVD; Event: Musical Cafe In (performance from 31 December 2010); Previous release: Exclusive Fan Club release (February 2011)	—	—		Track listing: includes footage from 31 December 2010 performance, highlights, rehearsal
2013	KIM HYUNG JUN The First-1st Special live concert in Seoul	Release Date: 31 May 2013; Format: 2DVD + Photobook; Event: Woori Art Hall at the Olympic Park; Event date: March 9, 2013	—	—		Track listing DVD 1: 2013 KIM HYUNG JUN; 1st Special live concert in Seoul; DVD 2: Concert making／; Photobook making in Hawaii; PHOTOBOOK: Concert Photo/Hawaii Photo
"—" denotes releases that did not chart or were not released in that region.

== Videography ==
=== Music videos ===
Year	Song	Director	Length
2011	"oH! aH!"		3:52
2011	"Girl"		
2011	"Long Night"		3:21
2012	"Sorry I'm Sorry"	Cha Eun Taek	4:22
2013	"Always Love You"	Kim Do Yeon and Park Jong Chul	3:39
2014	"Better"		4:23

== Others ==
=== Production credits ===
Year	Song	Artist	Role	Album
2008	"Want It"	SS501	co-lyricist with Kim Ki-bum (H&B)	U R Man
2008	"The One"	SS501	co-lyricist with Kim Ki-bum (H&B)	U R Man
2008	"I Am"	SS501	co-lyricist with Kim Ki-bum (H&B)	U R Man
2009	"Hey G"	Himself	co-composer with Kim Ki-bum (H&B)	SS501 Solo Collection
2009	"Green Peas"	SS501	co-lyricist with SS501	Rebirth
2009	"Obsess"	SS501	lyricist	Rebirth
2009	"Men from Mars, Women from Venus"	Himself	lyricist	Men from Mars, Women from Venus OST
2011	"No Other Woman But You"	Himself	lyricist	My Girl
2011	"Heaven"	Himself	lyricist	My Girl
2013	"Always Love You"	himself ft. Kota	co-producer	Non-album single

=== Concerts/Major Fan meetings ===
The following is an incomplete list of Kim Hyung-jun's concerts, major fanmeetings, and tours.

Year	Concert title	Details
2010	I AM "SS501 Kim Hyung Jun! 1st International Fan Meeting Tour	Venue: Singapore - August 28, 2010; Taiwan - October 24, 2010
2011	Kim Hyung Jun Japan 1st Party in Tokyo	Date: February 19, 2012
2011	Kim Hyung Jun Solo Showcase, My Girl	Place: Korea; Date: March 5, 2011
2011	KIM HYUNG JUN JAPAN LIVE TOUR 2011	Places: Nagoya, Osaka, Tokyo; Date: April - May
2011	Kim Hyung Jun 25th Birthday Party 2! 5! Concert	Date: August 8 in Korea
2011	Summer Festival in JAPAN	Venue: Japan
2011	Kim Hyung Jun 2011 Fan Meeting	Venues: Singapore, Hong Kong, Taipei
2012	1st Story in Japan	Venue: Japan
2012	2nd Story in Japan	Venue: Japan; ZEPP tour
2013	Kim Hyung Jun "The First"	Venue: Woori Art Hall, Olympic Park, Korea; Date: March 9, 2013
2013	Who Am I tour	Cities: Osaka, Nagoya, and Tokyo; Date: March 29 - April 27
2013	2013 Kim Hyung Jun birthday party tour	Venue: Japan
2014	The First Kim Hyung Jun’s Concert & Fanmeet	Venues: Peru, Chile and Bolivia; Date: January 10–17
2014	He, His Story	Venue: Yonsei University, South Korea; Date: February 8
2014	2014 Live Tour - Endless Story	Cities: Tokyo, Nagoya, Osaka Japan; Dates: October 10 - November 28

== See also ==
- SS501 discography
- Kim Hyun-joong discography
- Heo Young-saeng discography
- Kim Kyu-jong discography
- Park Jung-min discography
