= Better =

Better may refer to:

- "to better" as a verb, meaning to undergo betterment
- better, an alternate spelling of bettor, someone who bets (gambles)

== Music ==
=== Albums ===
- Better (Chrisette Michele album), 2013
- Better (Brian McKnight album), 2016
- Better (Haley Reinhart album), 2016
- Better (BoA album), 2020

=== Songs ===
- "Better" (The Screaming Jets song), 1991
- "Better" (Brooke Fraser song), 2003
- "Better" (Tom Baxter song)", 2007, covered by Boyzone in 2008
- "Better" (Guns N' Roses song), 2008
- "Better" (Maggie Rose song), 2012
- "Better" (Kim Hyung-jun song), 2014
- "Better" (Banks song), 2015
- "Better" (Haley Reinhart song), 2016
- "Better" (Meghan Trainor song), 2016
- "Better" (Mallrat song), 2017
- "Better" (Khalid song), 2018
- "Better" (Lena Meyer-Landrut and Nico Santos song), 2019
- "Better" (Twice song), 2020
- "Better" (Zayn song), 2020
- "Better" (MK and Burns song), 2022
- "Better" a 1992 song by Helmet from the album, Meantime
- "Better" a 1999 song by 8stops7 from the album, In Moderation
- "Better", a track from the 2000 single for the Erasure song, "Freedom"
- "Better", a 2001 song by Hoobastank from the album, Hoobastank
- "Better", a 2005 song by Plumb from the album, Chaotic Resolve
- "Better", a 2005 song by Sugababes from the album, Taller in More Ways
- "Better", a 2006 song by Toby Lightman from the album, Bird on a Wire
- "Better", a 2006 song by Regina Spektor from the album, Begin to Hope
- "Better", a 2010 song by Où Est Le Swimming Pool from the album, The Golden Year
- "Better", a 2012 song by Bow Wow
- "Better", a 2012 song by K'naan from the album, Country, God or the Girl
- "Better", a 2015 song by Chancellor
- "Better", a 2015 song by Kodaline from the album, Coming Up for Air
- "Better", a 2016 song by OneRepublic from the album, Oh My My
- "Better", a 2017 song by Maggie Rogers from the album, Now That the Light Is Fading
- "Better", a 2018 song by Estelle from the album, Lovers Rock
- "Better", a 2018 song by Felix Jaehn, featuring Clara Mae, from the album, I
- "Better", a 2019 song by Mamamoo from the album, Reality in Black
- "Better", a 2020 song by The Vamps from the album, Cherry Blossom
- "Better", a 2021 song by Gracie Abrams from the EP, This Is What It Feels Like
- "Better", a 2023 song by The Drums from the album, Jonny

== Organisations ==
- Better, the brand name of British sport and leisure charity Greenwich Leisure Limited
- Better.com, a mortgage lending company

== Television ==
- Better (talk show), also known as The Better Show, a syndicated lifestyle talk show and television program that was an extension of the magazine Better Homes and Gardens
- Better (British TV series), a 2023 BBC drama series

== See also ==
- Better Man (disambiguation)
