= 2022 in South Korean television =

This is a non-comprehensive list of Television in South Korea related events from 2022.

== Channels ==
Launches

- April 29 - ENA Story
- May 20 – tvN SPORTS
- November 1 - MX

== Ongoing ==
=== Animation ===
Title	Channel/Platform	First Aired	Source
The Haunted House	Tooniverse	July 20, 2016	

== New Series & Returning Shows ==
=== Drama ===
Title	Channel/Platform	First Aired	Finale	Status	Source
Dr. Park's Clinic	TVING	January 14	February 18	Ended	
Through the Darkness	SBS TV	January 14	March 12	Ended	
Ghost Doctor	tvN	January 3	February 22	Ended	
Rookie Cops	Disney+	January 26	March 16	Ended	
All of Us Are Dead	Netflix	January 28	Currently Airing	Ongoing	
Forecasting Love and Weather	JTBC	February 12	April 3	Ended	
Grid	Disney+	February 16	April 20	Ended	
Semantic Error	Watcha	February 16	March 10	Ended	
Thirty-Nine	JTBC	February 16	March 31	Ended	
The Love Is Coming	SBS	February 16	December 13	Ended	
Sponsor	iHQ	February 23	February 23	Ended	
Circle House	SBS TV	February 24	March 10	Ended	
Juvenile Justice	Netflix	February 25	February 25	Ended	
Military Prosecutor Doberman	tvN	February 28	Currently Airing	Ongoing	
Business Proposal	KBS2	February 28	Currently Airing	Ongoing	
Crazy Love	KBS2	March 7	Currently Airing	Ongoing	
Kill Heel	tvN	March 9	Currently Airing	Ongoing	
The Origin – A, B, Or What?	MBN	June	Currently Airing	Ongoing	
A Superior Day	OCN	March 13	Currently Airing	Ongoing	
It's Beautiful Now	KBS2	April 2	Currently Airing	Ongoing	
Green Mothers' Club	JTBC	April 6	Currently Airing	Ongoing	
Again My Life	SBS TV	April 8	Currently Airing	Ongoing	
The King of Pigs	TVING	March 18	March 18	Ended	
Soundtrack 1	Disney+	April 23	Currently Airing	Ongoing	
Our Blues	tvN	April 9	Currently Airing	Ongoing	
The Killer's Shopping List	JTBC	April 9	Currently Airing	Ongoing	
Bravo, My Life	KBS1	April 11	Currently Airing	Ongoing	
Secret House	MBC TV	April 11	Currently Airing	Ongoing	
Shooting Stars	tvN	April 22	Currently Airing	Ongoing	
From Now On, Showtime!	MBC TV	April 23	Currently Airing	Ongoing	
Monstrous	tvN	April 29	Currently Airing	Ongoing	
Live All Play	KBS2	April 27	Currently Airing	Ongoing	
The Sound of Magic	Netflix	May	Currently Airing	Ongoing	
Alchemy of Souls	tvN	June	Currently Airing	Ongoing	
Jinxed at First	KBS2	June	Currently Airing	Ongoing	
Babel 250	tvN	July 11	September 27	Ended	
New Recruit	olleh tv / seezn	July 22	August 5	Ended	
Don't Dare to Dream	SBS	August 24	November 10	Continues	
The K2	tvN	September 23	November 12	Ended	
The All-Round Wife	MBC TV	October 4	Currently Airing	Continues	

=== Animation ===
Title	Channel/Platform	First Aired	Finale	Status	Source
The Haunted House: Ghost Ball Z: Guido Exorcist	Tooniverse	April 28	July 28	Ended	

== Ending ==
End date	Title	Channel/Platform	First Aired	Source
March 22	Babysitter	KBS2	March 18	
May 7	Memory	TvN	March 24	
May 21	Secretly Greatly	MBC	December 4	
June 6	Entertainer	SBS	May 20	
June 9	I'm Sorry, But I Love You	SBS	December 19	
June 28	Another Miss Oh	tvN	May 2	
August 2	A Beautiful Mind	KBS2	June 20	
August 21	Happy Home	MBC	February 27	
September 20	Monster	Munhwa Broadcasting Corporation	March 24	
September 27	Babel 250	tvN	July 11	
December 13	The Love Is Coming	SBS	June 20	
November 12	The K2	tvN	September 23	
