= 2016 in South Korean television =

This is a non-comprehensive list of Television in South Korea related events from 2016.

== Channels ==
Launches:

- March 1 - AXN
- April 27 - MBN Plus
- August 1 -
  - SBS FiL UHD
  - SBS Plus UHD

== New Series & Returning Shows ==
=== Drama ===
Title	Channel/Platform	First Aired	Finale	Status	Source
Happy Home	MBC TV	February 27	August 21	Ended	
Babysitter	KBS2	March 14	March 22	Ended	
Memory	tvN	March 18	May 7	Ended	
Monster	MBC TV	March 28	September 20	Ended	
Entertainer	SBS TV	April 20	June 16	Ended	
Another Miss Oh	tvN	May 2	June 28	Ended	
A Beautiful Mind	KBS2	June 20	August 2	Ended	
The Love Is Coming	SBS TV	June 20	December 13	Ended	
Babel 250	tvN	July 11	September 27	Ended	
Don't Dare to Dream	SBS TV	August 24	November 10	Ended	
The K2	tvN	September 23	November 12	Ended	
Father, I'll Take Care of You	MBC TV	November 12	May 7	Ended	
Night Light	MBC TV	November 21	January 24	Ended	
I'm Sorry, But I Love You	SBS TV	December 19	June 9	Ended	
Secretly Greatly	MBC TV	December 4	May 21	Ended	

=== Animation ===
Title	Channel/Platform	First Aired	Finale	Status	Source
The Haunted House	Tooniverse	July 20	Currently Airing	Continues 2017	

== Ending ==
End date	Title	Channel/Platform	First Aired	Source
March 22	Babysitter	KBS2	March 18	
May 7	Memory	tvN	March 24	
May 21	Secretly Greatly	MBC TV	December 4	
June 9	I'm Sorry, But I Love You	SBS TV	December 19	
June 16	Entertainer	SBS TV	April 20	
June 28	Another Miss Oh	tvN	May 2	
August 2	A Beautiful Mind	KBS2	June 20	
August 21	Happy Home	MBC TV	February 27	
September 20	Monster	MBC TV	March 24	
September 27	Babel 250	tvN	July 11	
November 12	The K2	tvN	September 23	
December 13	The Love Is Coming	SBS TV	June 20	
