= 2020 in television =

2020 in television may refer to

- 2020 in American television for television-related events in the United States.
  - List of 2020 American television debuts for television debut related events in the United States.
- 2020 in Australian television for television-related events in Australia.
- 2020 in British television for television-related events in the United Kingdom.
  - 2020 in Scottish television for television-related events in Scotland.
- 2020 in Canadian television for television-related events in Canada.
- 2020 in Croatian television for television-related events in Croatia.
- 2020 in Estonian television for television-related events in Estonia.
- 2020 in Irish television for television-related events in the Republic of Ireland.
- 2020 in Japanese television for television-related events in Japan.
- 2020 in Philippine television for television-related events in the Philippines.
- 2020 in Tamil television for television-related events in India for Tamil language.
- 2020 in South Korean television for television-related events in South Korea.
