= Angelina Danilova =

Russian television personality and model

- Ангелина Данилова 안젤리나 다닐로바
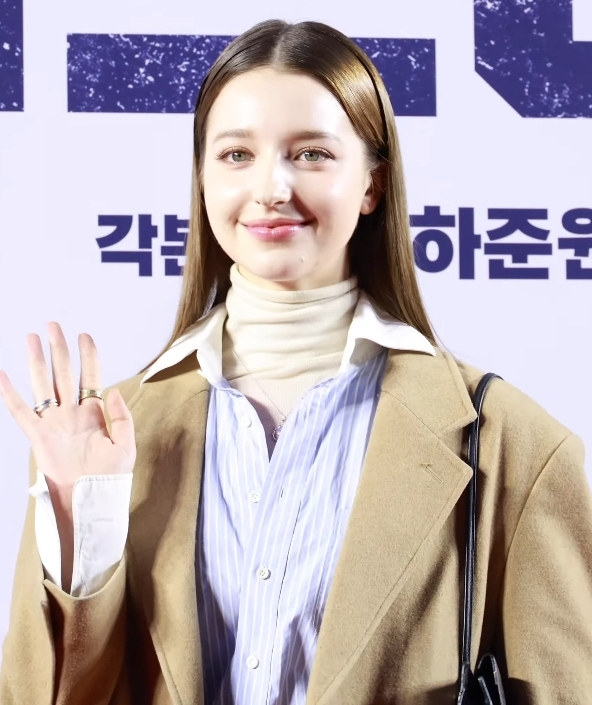
- Danilova in 2024
- Occupations: Television personality; model; singer
- Years active: 2016–present
- Agents: Palette Media (2016–2018); The Prizm Entertainment (2018–present)
- Musical career
- Genres: Ballad; K-Pop
- Instrument: Ukulele
- Label: Prizm

Angelina Sergeyevna Danilova (Russian: Ангелина Сергеевна Данилова; Korean: 안젤리나 다닐로바) is a Russian television personality and model based in South Korea. She made her solo singing debut with the digital single "As You Are" on January 17, 2020. She was the 2018 recipient of the Korea Image Flower Stone Award for her work on promoting Korea to the world.

== Biography ==
=== Career ===
In 2015, Danilova began a meteoric rise to fame when a Korean user reposted an image of her from 2014 to the Korean social networking site Naver with the caption "Russian model who wants to marry a Korean man". The post quickly went viral in Korea across all media platforms.

In 2016, Palette Media scouted Danilova through her Instagram, and invited her to Korea as a main cast member for the reality survival show Babel 250, in which she lived with six other participants from across the globe and tried to establish friendships while breaking cultural and linguistic barriers.

Since her appearance on the show, Danilova has met with success in Korean media and has appeared in over 10 television shows in the span of 3 years. She has featured in numerous modelling campaigns and music videos. In 2018, she appeared as Cinderella in the film New Old Story.

Danilova was featured in a 2016 music video for the song "Eyescream" by Hanhae. She later appeared in the music video for "Heart pound" (쿵쾅대) by Eddy Kim and in "우사인볼트 / Usain Bolt" by Swings and Han Yo Han.

On April 18, 2019, Danilova was a featured singer on Won Jang's second digital single, "Sorry".

On January 14, 2020, Angelina released a teaser clip on her Instagram to announce her debut as a singer. She made her debut with the ballad digital single "As You Are" on January 17, 2020.

As of July 2020, Danilova has over 1 million followers on her Instagram page, many of whom are not Korean. The influence Danilova wields in promoting Korean culture online has been a contributing factor in the spread of the Hallyu Wave throughout Western social media.

The Corea Image Communication Institute (CICI), a nonprofit organization that promotes Korean culture abroad, awarded Danilova as the 2018 recipient of the Korea Image Flower Stone Award for her work promoting Korea to the world. Fellow recipients that day included Sohn Kyung Shik, chairman of CJ Group, the food and media conglomerate, and Joachim Son-Forget, the first Korean-born member of the French National Assembly. Past award winners of CICI Korea Image Awards include K-pop stars Psy and Rain, maestro Chung Myung-whun, and former Secretary-General of the United Nations Ban Ki-moon.

=== Personal life ===
She has stated her hobbies include: dancing, singing, playing ukulele, listening to music, fashion, traveling, horse riding, snowboarding, kite surfing, drawing and filming videos. One of her artistic aspirations is music composition.

== Controversy ==
In 2018, Danilova left Palette Media and joined her current agency the Prizm Entertainment. Palette Media accused her of fraud, and filed a complaint with the Seoul High Prosecutors' Office against Danilova, accusing her of failing to fulfil her contractual obligations and entering into a contract with another agency without Palette Media's agreement. Palette Media claimed it made an exclusive three-year (2016–2019) contract with Danilova, who rose to fame on social media as "the most beautiful K-pop fan". Palette Media alleged that she took part in promotional events and received sponsorship on several occasions without the agency's permission. Separately, the agency said it has filed a damages suit against her for her "illegal commercial activities."

== Filmography ==
=== Film ===
Year	Title	Role	Ref.
2018	New Old Story	Cinderella	
2020	The Swordsman	Gurutai's mistress	

=== Television series ===
Year	Title	Role	Notes	Ref.
2017	Still Loving You	Customers exercising	Extra	
2023	The Uncanny Counter	Jade (Wi-gen's daughter)	Season 2	

=== Television shows ===
Title	Role	Broadcast period	Remark
Babel 250	A fixed performer	July 11, 2016 – September 27, 2016	
Mixtape	Panel	December 30, 2016	
My Neighbor, Charles	Guest	March 21, 2017	
Stargram Season 2	Special Guest	April 18, 2017	
The Real Maxim Models	Performer	April 30, 2017	
Newcomers	Guest	June 1, 2017	
Girls Diary-Single White Paper	Fixed performer	June 30, 2017 – September 15, 2017	
Newcomers	Guest	July 13, 2017	
Happy Map	Performer	September 30, 2017	Yecheon
Happy Map	Performer	October 21, 2017	Enhance
Happy Map	Performer	November 4, 2017	Hadong
Happy Map	Performer	November 18, 2017	Gangneung
Happy Map	Performer	December 2, 2017	Yeosu
My Room Guide	Special appearance (daily interpreter)	December 6, 2017	
Happy Map	Performer	December 9, 2017	Jindo
South Korean Foreigners	Fixed appearances	October 17, 2018	
Check In The Hotel	Fixed appearances	January 16, 2019 – February 6, 2019	
Happy Together Season 4	Guest	March 28, 2019	
Happy Together Season 4	Guest	April 4, 2019	
Hello Counselor	Guest	April 30, 2019	
Hon-Life: Satisfaction Project	Guest	August 31, 2019 – September 7, 2019	
Love of 7.7 Billion	Panel	February 10, 2020 ~	
Happy Together Season 4	Guest	February 27, 2020	

== Discography ==
=== Radio broadcast ===
Broadcaster	title	role	Broadcast period	Remark
SBS Power FM	《Bae Sung-jae's Ten》	Special appearance	January 19, 2019	
SBS Power FM	《Bae Sung-jae's Ten》	Fixed Guest	February 15 – March 22, 2019	
SBS Power FM	《Bae Sung-jae's Ten》	Guest	December 10, 2019	

=== Music video ===
year	Singer	title
2016	Hanhae	EYESCREAM(여름, 아이스크림)
2017	Eddy Kim	Heart pound (쿵쾅대)
2019	Swings	Usain Bolt (우사인볼트)

=== Digital single ===
order	Record information	Track list
'1'	'As You Are': Release date: January 17, 2020; Label: Kakao M	1. 'As You Are'; 2. As You Are (ENG Ver.); 3. As You Are (inst.)
'2'	'Sun Dance': Release date: June 4, 2021; Label: Warner Music Korea	1. 'Sun Dance' (Feat.HANHAE)

=== Features ===
year	Singer	Song name
2017	HotSauce	Take U Higher
2019	Won Jang	Sorry
2021	Eian	ELLA

== Modeling ==
=== Advertising ===
year	Kinds	Company name	product name	Reference
2016	O2O Service	Call in Earth	Agent driving application kit	Cover model
2016	beauty medical equipment	Hyronic Co., Ltd.	Hyronic	Exclusive model
2016	beauty medical equipment	Attibe Beauty Co., Ltd.	Attibe Beauty	Exclusive model
2017	Mobile Game	Me2on	Full Pot Hold'em: The Genius; Full House Casino; Casino Dream	Public Relations Model
2017	Cosmetics	XYZ Formula	Ceracrow moisturizing cream-bread edition	
2017	Cosmetics	XYZ Formula	XYZ Cream-Moisturizing Test Dryer	
2017	Mobile Game	4: 33	Five Kingdoms Story	
2017	Cosmetics	Vanilla & Co	Deer Hydration Boosting Cream	
2018	Hair Specialty Brand	Hairco Story	Hairco Story	
2019	Cosmetics	Uni Cosmetic	Noblesse Gold Gold Ampoule	
2019	Cafe Franchise	Angelus	Black sugar americano	
2019	Cosmetics	Chapstick	Chapstick Tinted Lip Oil Autumn Rose	
2019	Mobile Game	4399 Korea	Miracle sword	

=== Pictorial ===
year	Pictorial / magazine	Reference
2017	Maxim Korea March issue	
2017	Tag magazine	
2017	Jean-Charles de Castelbajac 17 FW pictorial	French Fashion Group
2018	December issue of HIM	

== Awards ==
=== Model career ===
- Sky Model Agency Professional Model
- 2017 F /W Hera Seoul Fashion Week Fashion Show Model
- 2017 Fashion Magazine The Naver Model

=== Actress career ===
year	awards	sector	source
2018	2018 Korea Image Awards Ceremony	Flower statue	CICI
