= Leila Farzad =

British actress

- Born: Leila Effat Farzad; Westminster, London, England
- Education: Worcester College, Oxford; Guildhall School of Music and Drama
- Occupation: Actress
- Years active: 2006–present
- Spouse: James Maizels
- Children: 1

Leila Effat Farzad is a British actress. She is known for her role as Naomi Jones in the Sky Atlantic series I Hate Suzie (2020–2022), which earned her a British Academy Television Award nomination.

== Early life and education ==
Leila Effat Farzad was born in London to Iranian parents. She was inspired to pursue acting by National Theatre productions her aunt took her to see; however, her parents insisted that she get a degree from Oxbridge first.

She first studied modern languages at Worcester College, Oxford, graduating with a Bachelor of Arts in French and Italian Literature. She then went on to train at the Guildhall School of Music and Drama, which she said "felt like home".

== Career ==
Farzad began her career with a voice role in the third and fourth series of the Channel 5 animated children's series Peppa Pig. She made her live action television debut in an episode of the ITV police procedural Law & Order: UK and her professional stage debut as the titular role in Miriam. Gonzalez. Durantez. at Theatre503. This was followed by roles in Blue Remembered Hills at Chichester Festival Theatre, Julius Caesar at the Bridge Theatre in London, Richard II at Shakespeare's Globe. She also appeared in the ITV anthology Innocent.

Farzad landed her first main role in I Hate Suzie as Naomi Jones, Suzie's (Billie Piper) manager and friend. The series was released in 2020 on Sky Atlantic and HBO Max to critical acclaim, and Farzad was nominated for the British Academy Television Award for Best Supporting Actress. Farzad reprised her role in I Hate Suzie's second instalment titled I Hate Suzie Too in 2022.British Academy Television Award nomination.

Also in 2022, Farzad joined the cast of Avenue 5 for its second season and appeared alongside Josh Hartnett in The Fear Index, also on Sky.

In 2023, she starred in the BBC crime drama Better.

== Personal life ==
Farzad has a daughter, born in 2014, with James Maizels. In 2023, Farzad began a brief affair with Andrew Buchan, her co-star in Better.

== Filmography ==
=== Film ===
Year	Title	Role	Notes
2023	The Marvels	Talia	
2025	Bank of Dave 2: The Loan Ranger	Margot	
2025	Bridget Jones: Mad About the Boy	Perfect Nicolette	
2025	Good Luck Fuck Face	Zara	Short film
2025	Pose	Dolly	Original title: Turn Up the Sun!
2025	Jay Kelly	1st AD	
2026	Overtones	Nicky	Short film

=== Television ===
Year	Title	Role	Notes
2004–2015	Peppa Pig	Mummy Pony / Mummy Cat (voices)	Recurring roles; 15 episodes
2009	Law & Order: UK	Leyla Bilgin	Episode: "Paradise"
2010	Married Single Other	Student Doctor	Episode: "Chink"
2011	Twenty Twelve	Journalist	Episode: "Countdown"
2013	Man Down	Eyebrow Lady	Episode: "Desperate Dan"
2015	Cuffs	Amika Khan	Mini-series; episode: "Drastic Action"
2017	Count Arthur Strong	Reporter	Episode: "Untrue Detective"
2018	Innocent	Janice Parker	Episodes #1.1 and #1.2
2020–2022	I Hate Suzie	Naomi Jones	Main role; series 1 and 2; 11 episodes
2021	This Time with Alan Partridge	Clarissa Hoskin	Episode #2.1
2021	Landscapers	Barrister	Mini-series; episode 4
2022	The Fear Index	Gabrielle Hoffman	4 episodes
2022	Avenue 5	Elena	Season 2; 7 episodes
2023	Better	DI Lou Slack	Main role; 5 episodes
2023	Black Mirror	Mona Javadi	Episode: "Joan Is Awful"
2024	The Decameron	Stratilia	Mini-series; 8 episodes
2024	Kaos	Ari (Ariadne)	6 episodes
2026	How to Get to Heaven from Belfast	Marnie	4 episodes
2026	Two Weeks in August	Nat	Main cast; mini-series; 8 episodes
TBA	Army of Shadows		Upcoming series

== Stage ==
Year	Title	Role	Notes
2010	Miriam. Gonzalez. Durantez.	Miriam Gonzalez	Theatre503, London
2012	Blue Remembered Hills	Angela	Chichester Festival Theatre, Chichester
2018	Julius Caesar	Decius Brutus	Bridge Theatre, London
2019	Richard II	Queen	Globe Theatre, London
2026	Under the Shadow	Shideh	Almeida Theatre, London

== Awards and nominations ==
Year	Award	Category	Nominated work	Result	Ref.
2021	British Academy Television Awards	Best Supporting Actress	I Hate Suzie	Nominated	
