= Hon-Life: Satisfaction Project =

South Korean television show

- Genre: Reality television
- Starring: Jun Hyun-moo
- Country of origin: South Korea
- Original language: Korean
- No. of episodes: 6

Original release
- Network: JTBC
- Release: August 3 – September 7, 2019

Hon-Life: Satisfaction Project (Korean: 혼라이프 만족 프로젝트 - 혼족어플) is a South Korean show distributed by JTBC airs on Saturday at 6:10 KST.

== Format ==
It is showcase the lifestyles of celebrities who enjoy being alone, such as eating and traveling alone.

== Cast ==
- Main Host
  - Jun Hyun-moo
- Cast
  - Min Kyung-hoon
  - Kang Han-na
  - JeA
  - Kim Hee-chul
  - Angelina Danilova
  - Ji Sang

== List of episodes and ratings ==
In the tables below, the blue numbers represent the lowest ratings and the red numbers represent the highest ratings.

| Episode | Air date | Cast | Note | Rating |
|---|---|---|---|---|
| 1 | August 3, 2019 | JeA, Kang Han-na, Min Kyung-hoon | | 0.828% |
| 2 | August 10, 2019 | JeA, Kang Han-na, Min Kyung-hoon | | 0.739% |
| 3 | August 17, 2019 | JeA, Kang Han-na, Kim Hee-chul | | 0.836% |
| 4 | August 24, 2019 | JeA, Kang Han-na, Kim Hee-chul | Special MC: Lee Jin-hyuk | 0.882% |
| 5 | August 31, 2019 | JeA, Kang Han-na, Angelina Danilova | Special MC: Lee Jin-hyuk | 0.727% |
| 6 | September 7, 2019 | JeA, Kang Han-na, Angelina Danilova, Ji Sang | | 0.734% |
