= JeA =

South Korean singer

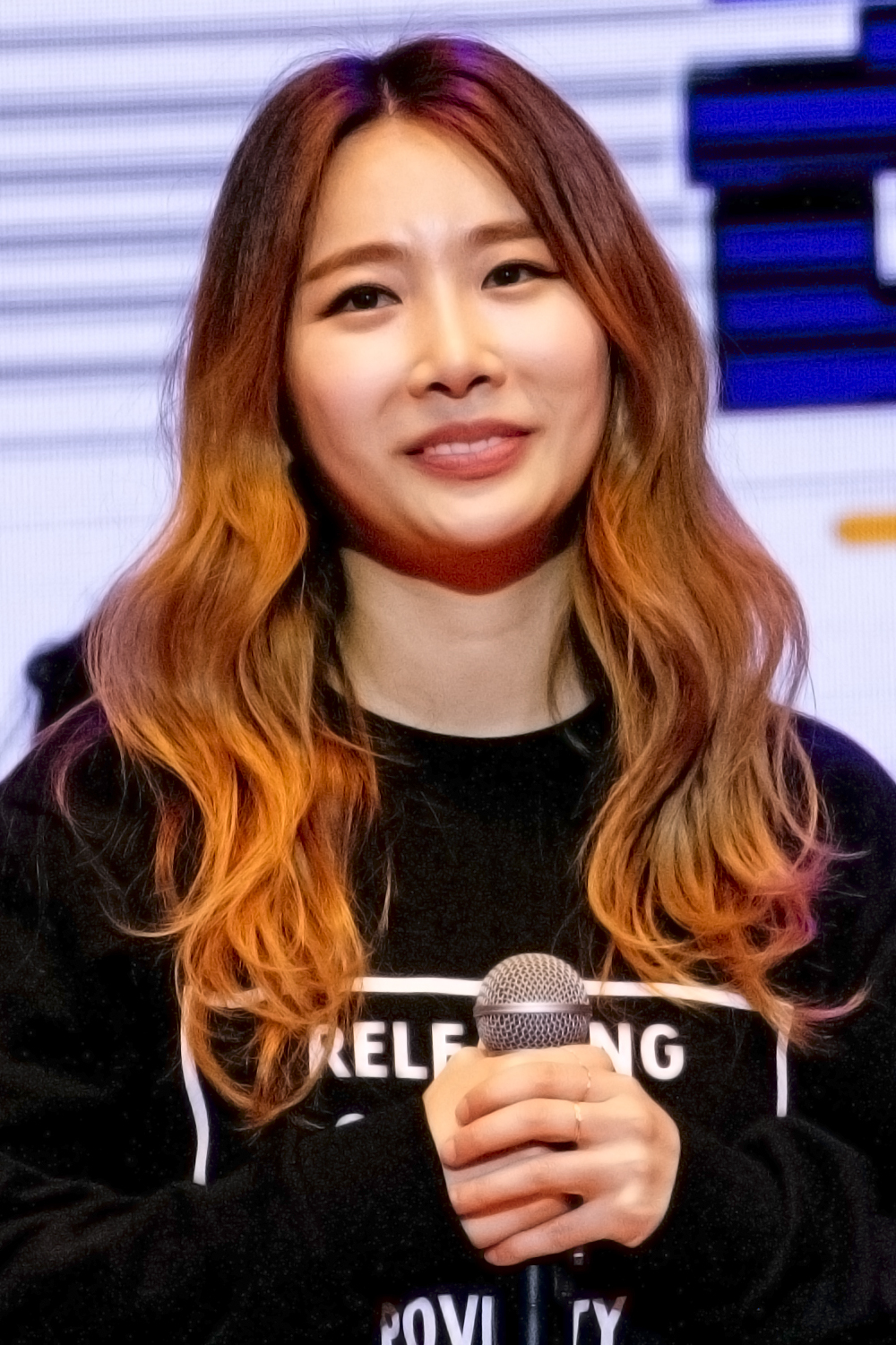
- JeA in March 2018
- Born: Kim Hyo-jin; September 18, 1981 (age 45); Seoul, South Korea
- Other name: JeA
- Occupations: Singer; songwriter
- Musical career
- Genres: K-pop; R&B
- Instrument: Vocals
- Years active: 2006–present
- Labels: Green Snake E&M
- Member of: Brown Eyed Girls

Korean name
- Hangul: 김효진
- Hanja: 金孝珍
- RR: Gim Hyojin
- MR: Kim Hyojin

Stage name
- Hangul: 제아
- RR: Jea
- MR: Chea

Kim Hyo-jin (Korean: 김효진; born September 18, 1981), better known by her stage name JeA (Korean: 제아), is a South Korean singer and songwriter. She is best known as the leader of South Korean girl group Brown Eyed Girls. As a solo artist, she has contributed numerous songs to various soundtracks.

== Career ==
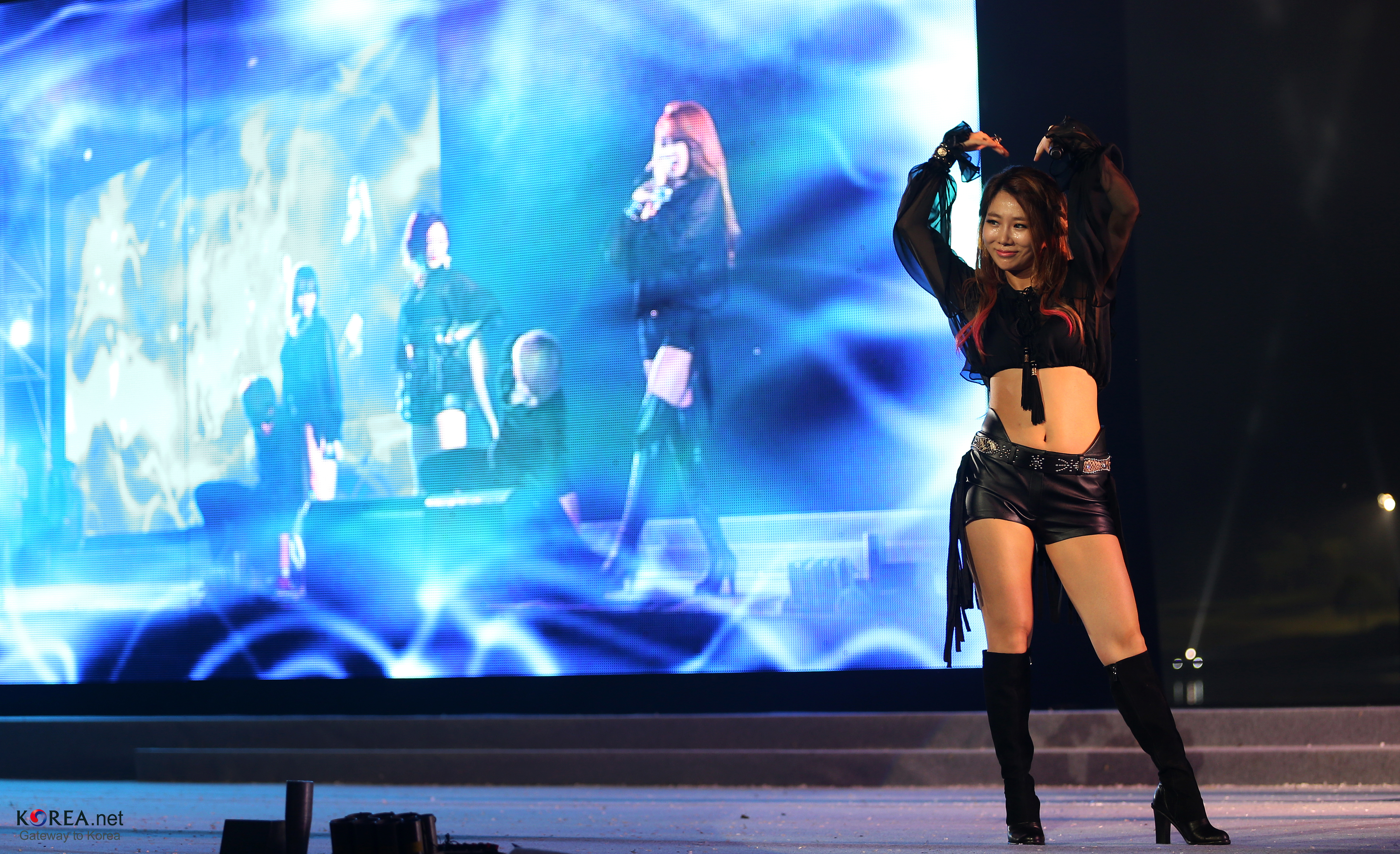
JeA in 2013

=== Brown Eyed Girls ===
JeA is the one responsible for the creation of Brown Eyed Girls and was actively involved in the selection of the other members besides herself. The four members – JeA, Narsha, Gain and Miryo – performed several small shows under the name "Crescendo" before officially debuting as Brown Eyed Girls in 2006. JeA is the leader and main vocalist of the group.

=== Solo career ===
JeA released her first solo album, Just JeA, in 2013. She is the last of the members of Brown Eyed Girls to release a solo album. Aside from being a singer, she's also a composer and producer. She started composing for her group with their second album and later on wrote songs for other artists. She expanded her resume by trying her hand on producing with the Brown Eyed Girls and her solo album.

On August 4, 2021, Mystic Story's contract with JeA expired. In November 2022, JeA signed with Green Snake E&M.

== Song writing ==
JeA is an avid songwriter, and has written many songs for herself, Brown Eyed Girls and other artists.

=== List of songs written by JeA ===
Year	Artist	Title	Lyrics	Composition
2006	Brown Eyed Girls	"Far Away (feat. MC Mong)"	Yes	No
2007	Brown Eyed Girls	"최면" (Hypnosis)	No	Yes
2009	Brown Eyed Girls	"잘할게요" (JeA's Wedding Song)	Yes	Yes
2009	Gain, Jo Kwon	"I Happen to Love You" (우리 사랑하게 됐어요)	No	Yes
2010	Miryo, JeA	"Love Is..."	No	Yes
2011	Brown Eyed Girls	"불편한 진실" (An Inconvenient Truth)	Yes	Yes
2012	Brown Eyed Girls	"한 여름 밤의 꿈" (A Midsummer Night's Dream)	No	Yes
2012	B1A4	"Be My Girl (Jinyoung solo)"	Yes	Yes
2013	JeA	"안아보자 (feat. Jeong Yeop)" (Let's Hug)	No	Yes
2013	Gain, Cho Hyung-woo	"2시의 데이트" (2 o'clock Date)	No	Yes
2013	Ailee	"열애설" (Scandal)	No	Yes
2013	Brown Eyed Girls	"After Club"	No	Yes
2013	Brown Eyed Girls	"날아갈래" (I'm Going to Fly)	No	Yes
2013	Brown Eyed Girls	"KILL BILL"	No	Yes
2013	M&N	"오늘밤" (Tonight)	No	Yes
2014	Sunny Hill	"Paradise (feat. JeA)"	No	Yes
2015	Laboum	"Fantasy"	No	Yes
2015	Brown Eyed Girls	"Light"	No	Yes
2015	Brown Eyed Girls	"Fractal"	No	Yes
2016	JeA	"눈물섬" (Island of Tears)	No	Yes
2016	JeA	"겨울 너야" (Winter, It's You)	No	Yes
2016	JeA	"You o'clock"	No	Yes
2019	JeA	"Dear. Rude (Feat. Cheetah)"	No	Yes
2019	JeA	"Newself (With JINBO)"	No	Yes
2019	April	"Feeling"	Yes	Yes
2020	Brown Eyed Girls	"2019년 겨울 첫눈으로 만든 그댈 2020년 눈으로 다시 만들 순 없겠지만" (Snowman)	No	Yes
2021	Weeekly	"나비 동화" (Butterfly)	No	Yes

== Discography ==
=== Extended plays ===
Title	Album details	Peak chart positions	Sales
Title	Album details	KOR	Sales
Just JeA	Released: January 4, 2013; Label: Nega Network; Format: CD, Digital download	4	KOR: 3,787

=== Singles ===
Title	Year	Peak chart positions		Sales	Album
Title	Year	KOR		Sales	Album
Title	Year	Gaon	Hot	Sales	Album
As lead artist
"The Day" (with Kim Yeon-ji)	2006	—N/a	—N/a		To My Lover (single)
"Because You Sting" (니가 따끔거려서) (with G.O of MBLAQ)	2010	12	—N/a	KOR: 576,100	Non-album single
"Let's Hug" (안아보자) (with Jeong Yeop of Brown Eyed Soul)	2012	5	5	KOR: 1,465,699	Just JeA
"While You're Sleeping" (그대가 잠든 사이)	2013	28	36	KOR: 189,596	Just JeA
"Flower" (with SAT)	2013	—	—	KOR: 18,201	Non-album single
"Just One Day" (하루만이라도) (feat. Baro of B1A4)	2015	60	—N/a	KOR: 24,651	Apgujeong Boangwan Project (single)
"Bad Girl" (나쁜 여자) (with Jeong Yeop of Brown Eyed Soul)	2016	94	—N/a	KOR: 29,389	Non-album single
"Winter, It's You" (겨울 너야)	2016	—	—N/a		You o'clock (single)
"You're Different" (그댄 달라요) (with Ra.D)	2017	—	—N/a		Non-album singles
"Only Without Me" (나만 없다면)	2017	—	—		Non-album singles
"An Ordinary Christmas" (크리스마스 별거 없어) (with Kim Young-chul)	2017	—	—		Non-album singles
"Dear. Rude" (with Cheetah)	2019	—	—		Newself (single)
"Greedyy" (feat. Moonbyul)	2020	—	—		Non-album singles
"With A Song" (with Cheetah, Hayoung, Eunkwang, and Parc Jae-jung)	2020	—	—		Non-album singles
As featured artist
"Do You Know" (알고 있나요) (Duet version) (Someday feat. JeA)	2009	—N/a	—N/a		Someday
"La La Land" (랄라랜드) (Cho PD feat. JeA and Narsha)	2010	22	—N/a		Part 2: Art of Business

=== Soundtrack appearances ===
Title	Year	Peak chart positions	Sales	Album
Title	Year	KOR Gaon	Sales	Album
Credited as Kim Hyo-jin
"Please Stay by My Side" (내 곁에 남아달라고) (with Guk Tae Ha)	2003	—N/a		Escape from Unemployment OST
"I Told You I Love You" (사랑한다고 말했잖아요)	2003	—N/a		Bodyguard OST
"Feeling of Love" (사랑느낌)	2004	—N/a		Lovers in Paris OST
Credited as JeA
"Have Sorrow" (애상가)	2007	—N/a		The King and I OST
"Hateful Love" (미운 사랑) (with Black Pearl)	2008	—N/a		East of Eden OST
"Much Love" (다애/多愛)	2008	—N/a		The Kingdom of the Winds OST
"Harmony" (하모니) (with Lee Young Hyun of Big Mama)	2010	24		Harmony OST
"Stray Child" (미아)	2010	26		The Slave Hunters OST
"Poison"	2010	—		The Fugitive: Plan B OST
"Fool For You" (그대 바보)	2011	10	KOR: 441,778	Padam Padam OST
"Because of You" (너 때문에)	2012	23	KOR: 472,527	History of a Salaryman OST
"Secret Note" (비밀노트)	2013	97		When a Man Falls in Love OST
"Want it" (원해) (with Cho PD)	2016	—		Sweet Stranger and Me OST
"Alone"	2018	—		Ms. Ma, Nemesis OST
"I Know It's You" (알 것 같아)	2019	—		Welcome 2 Life OST
"Because I Miss You" (보고 싶은 그대니까요)	2020	—		Born Again OST

=== Other charted songs ===
Title	Year	Peak chart positions	Sales	Album
Title	Year	KOR Gaon	Sales	Album
"Love Is..." (with Miryo)	2010	18		Blue Band Trauma Part 1
"Be My Girl" (Jinyoung of B1A4 feat. JeA)	2012	86	KOR: 33,065	In the Wind

== Filmography ==
=== Television shows ===
Year	Title	Notes
2016	Produce 101	Trainer
2016	King of Mask Singer	Contestant as "Bangkok Friends Fan" (episodes 69 and 70)
2016	Girl Spirit	Episode 8
2019	Hon-Life: Satisfaction Project	Cast
2019	Studio Vibes	MC
2020	My Life's Traveling Cut	Cast With Lee Chang-min, Lee Chi-hyun, Won Mi-yeon
2021	Godiva Show	Contestant
2021	Dinga Dinga	Host
2022	Queen of Ssireum	Participant
2022	Dream Maker: Search For the Next Global Pop Group	Korean Guest Mentor
