= Better Man =

Better Man or Betterman may refer to:

== Film and television ==
=== Films ===
- The Better Man (1914 film), a lost silent film directed by William Powers
- The Better Man (1926 film), an American silent film directed by Scott R. Dunlap
- A Better Man (film), a 2017 Canadian documentary directed by Attiya Khan and Lawrence Jackman
- Better Man (film), a 2024 biopic about Robbie Williams

=== Television ===
- A Better Man (TV series), a 2025 Norwegian series by Thomas Seeberg Torjussen
- Better Man (2016 TV series), a Taiwanese drama series
- Better Man (miniseries), a 2013 Australian miniseries
- Betterman (TV series), a 1999 Japanese anime series
- "The Better Man" (The Venture Bros.), a 2009 episode

== Literature ==
- The Better Man, a 1910 novel by Cyrus Townsend Brady
- The Better Man, a 1916 short story collection by Robert W. Chambers
- The Better Man, a 1994 Star Trek novel by Howard Weinstein
- The Better Man (novel), a 2000 novel by Anita Nair
- A Better Man, a 2019 novel by Louise Penny

== Music ==
=== Albums ===
- A Better Man (album), by Brian Kennedy, or the title song, 1996
- A Better Man, by Ogie Alcasid, 2002

=== Songs ===
- "Better Man" (Little Big Town song), 2016; covered by Taylor Swift, 2021
- "Better Man" (Pearl Jam song), 1994
- "Better Man" (Robbie Williams song), 2001
- "Better Man" (The Warren Brothers song), 1999
- "Better Man" (Westlife song), 2019
- "A Better Man" (Clint Black song), 1989
- "A Better Man" (Thunder song), 1993
- "Betterman", by John Butler Trio from Three, 2001
- "Betterman", by Virginia to Vegas, 2020
- "Better Man", by 5 Seconds of Summer from Youngblood, 2018
- "Better Man", by Ellie Goulding from Higher Than Heaven, 2023
- "Better Man", by Hellyeah from Stampede, 2010
- "Better Man", by James Morrison from Undiscovered, 2006
- "Better Man", by Lady Antebellum from Golden, 2013
- "Better Man", by Leon Bridges from Coming Home, 2015
- "Better Man", by PartyNextDoor from Seven Days, 2017
- "Better Man", by the Prom Kings, 2005
- "Better Man", by Oasis from Heathen Chemistry, 2002
- "Better Man", by Paolo Nutini from Caustic Love, 2014
- "Better Man", by Hellyeah from Stampede, 2010
- "A Better Man", by Shayne Ward from Shayne Ward, 2006

== See also ==
- "Better Man, Better Off", a 1997 song by Tracy Lawrence
- Bettermann, a surname
- Phil, Hope, and Dawn Betterman, characters from the film The Croods: A New Age
