= Nam Yu-jin =

South Korean singer-songwriter (born 1995)

Nam Yu-jin 남유진
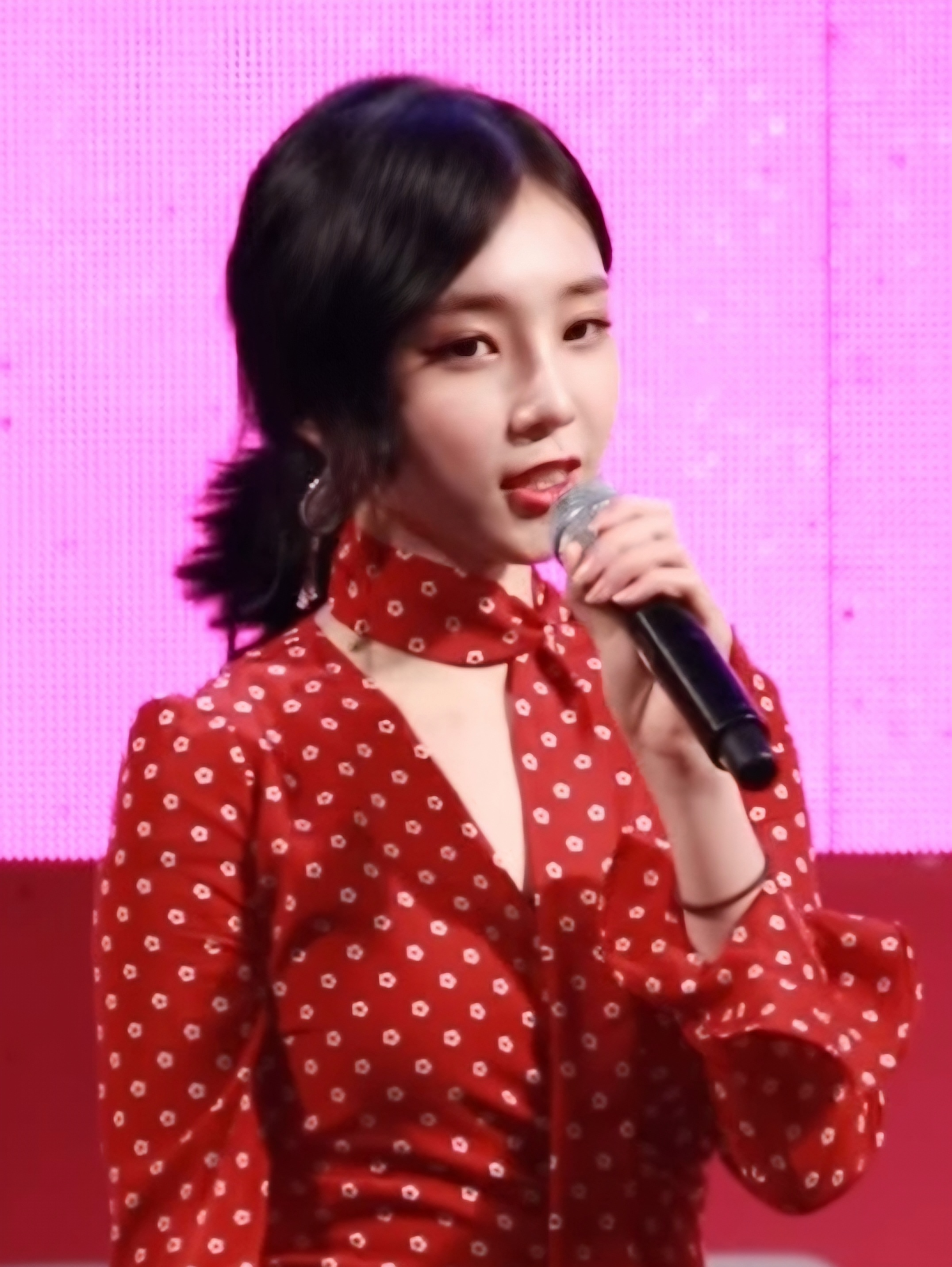
- Nam in 2018

Background information
- Also known as: Eyedi
- Born: December 8, 1995 (age 30); Suncheon, South Korea
- Origin: South Korea
- Genres: R&B; synth-pop; city pop
- Occupations: Singer-songwriter; composer; actress
- Years active: 2016–2020
- Labels: Bace Camp Studio; Pony Canyon

Korean name
- Hangul: 남유진
- RR: Nam Yujin
- MR: Nam Yujin

Nam Yu-jin (Korean: 남유진; born December 8, 1995), formerly known by her stage name Eyedi (Korean: 아이디), is a South Korean singer-songwriter, composer, and actress. She debuted in 2016 under Bace Camp Studios with the self-written single "Sign" and released her first album, Mix B, in 2017. Later that year, Nam participated on the survival reality show Mix Nine, where she finished fifth out of the female contestants. In 2019, she was a cast member on the reality show Studio Vibes, and was then cast as Lee Eun-byul in the web drama Thumbs Up Feeds Me (2020). She departed from Bace Camp Studios in 2024 following approximately four years of legal disputes.

== Name ==
Nam derived her stage name "Eyedi" from ID (identity) in Korean, expressing her goal of people recognizing her when they listen to her music.

In February 2024, Nam adopted her birth name, Nam Yu-jin, as her stage name, and announced that she would no longer use the name "Eyedi".

== Career ==
=== 2016–2017: Debut, Mix B, and Mix Nine ===
Nam became interested in music and dreamed of becoming a singer after joining the singing club in her second year of high school; however, she also wanted to become a fashion designer since she enjoyed art. Nam made her debut on July 19, 2016, under Bace Camp Studios with the single "Sign", which she cowrote with Loopy and Francis and coproduced. She contacted Loopy after watching his YouTube videos prior to his debut, and they began working together. The music video for "Sign" was filmed in Los Angeles, but the footage was lost and behind-the-scenes footage was used instead. On July 21, she attended 2016 International Fashion Week in Zhengzhou to perform "Sign" as well as "Firework" by Katy Perry. She held her first fan signing event on July 23. Nam appeared on SBS Radio and performed a cover of "What You Do" by Chrisette Michele.

On November 8, Nam released the single album Not Lonely, including the title track "Not Lonely" and its instrumental version, as well as an acoustic version of "Sign", which she performed at the Acoustic X De Rêve Fashion Show'.

On January 16, 2017, Nam released her third single album Chapter 21, featuring Korean and English versions of the song "Type" and an instrumental version. The Korean version featured Kim Hyo-eun, who appeared on Show Me the Money 3, and the English version featured Mario Winans.

Nam announced the release of her song "Best Mistake" on March 17, with the album name Mix B announced two days later with a teaser of the album uploaded. The album included a remastered version of "Sign" as well as five new tracks, of which the title track "Best Mistake" and "Falling" she wrote herself. Mix B was released on March 21. Nam attended 2017 F/W Seoul Fashion Week. On April 14, she had her first music show performance with "Best Mistake" on Show Champion. In June, Nam starred in her first commercial film for FUNPICK X Pikicast. She held her second fan meeting on July 1.

She released her first EP Tomorrowland on August 4 with the tracks "Tomorrowland" and "Dreamcatcher" along instrumentals for both tracks. "Tomorrowland" was written for a suicide prevention campaign, and Nam stated that she "ruminated on the lyrics as I wrote them in hopes of giving strength".

On October 29, Nam and labelmate Jung Sa-ra auditioned for Mix Nine with "Spotlight" by Jennifer Hudson. In Episode 14, she ranked fifth, placing her in the debut line-up for the female team. However, the female team lost to the male team in the last episode, losing the opportunity to debut. She later stated that when she joined the show, she was under the impression that Mix Nine was a show for underrated artists to showcase their talent, not an idol program, but found it a valuable experience and does not regret participating.

=== 2018–2024: Debut in Japan, acting debut, and hiatus ===
Nam released her second EP Luv Highway with the title track of the same name and a second song "A Midsummer Night's Dream", as well as instrumentals for both tracks. She uploaded music videos for both songs. The "Luv Highway" music video was supposed to be shot in Okinawa, but the schedule coincided with the Japanese holidays so she was unable to film there. The music video features Nam and Lee Jong-won as a couple on a date.

She made her debut in Japan with an extended play under Pony Canyon titled coll[a]ction. The release contained a Japanese version of "Sign" featuring Jinmenusagi, and its music video was shot in Tokyo with a focus on color and released on August 10. The name coll[a]ction is a portmanteau of "collection" and "action", with the desire for the release to express the feeling of capturing Eyedi's songs.

Nam released her fifth single "Red" on September 21 alongside a music video. "Red" was described as "jazz-style soul classic R&B that embodies a deeper and more vintage sound than a trendy style". Eyed was selected to perform at 2018 MU:CON in Seoul.

On October 21, Nam held her first solo concert "The Red Station", performing her songs and also covering "If You Let Me" by Sinéad Harnett, "What You Do" by Chrisette Michele, and "Have I Told You Lately" by Olivia Ong.

Nam released "Caffeine" on December 17.

On April 6, 2019, Nam released the single "&New". On June 6, Nam opened her YouTube channel Hey, Dream, where fans submit stories via comment and she selects a winner whom she contacts. Nam appeared on Studio Vibes, covering "Make You Feel My Love" by Bob Dylan with another participant.

She later released her second Japanese single "Perfect 6th Sense" with the intention of awakening the sixth sense with the music. It was described as depicting "the liberation of oneself to challenge music". Nam was involved in the songwriting, composition, and production process. The music video was released on August 5, and Nam commented that it was "flashier" than her previous music videos, and the highlight was the colors used.

On December 8, 2019, Nam participated in the MU:CON collaboration track "7UP", helping write and compose the track alongside Kevin Wild of Bad Royale and others. The song was described as electronica and pop, with the bass rhythm and drum loop adding "a dreamy atmosphere".

On March 13, 2020, Nam released her tenth single "J.usT". On December 8, following a hiatus, she posted a snippet of a song, captioned to be released in 2021.

Nam returned to YouTube on March 5, 2021, announcing that she would be continuing "Hey, Dream". However, there were no updates following the announcement. On July 10, 2022, the CEO of Bace Camp Studios stated that Eyedi was on indefinite hiatus.

=== 2024–2026: Departure from label and retirement ===
On February 19, 2024, Nam announced through KakaoTalk that she had departed from Bace Camp Studio following approximately four years of legal disputes, and that she would continue her career under her birth name, Nam Yu-jin.

On February 13, 2026, Nam announced her marriage through KakaoTalk, and that she was retiring from the public eye.

== Artistry ==
=== Influences ===
Nam has named Stevie Wonder and Beyoncé as influences, and lists Lee Su-hyun from AKMU, Taemin from Shinee, and Jay Park as artists she would like to collaborate with.

=== Songwriting ===
Nam began composing prior to her debut, and she began to compose more of her releases after receiving recognition for "Tomorrowland" from the head of her agency. Her songwriting is influenced by colors, such as her single "Red", and she draws inspiration from sunsets and art galleries.

=== Fashion ===
Nam has expressed interest in fashion and has stated that 90% of the props and clothes used in her music videos are from her collection.

== Discography ==
=== Studio albums ===
Title	Album details	Peak chart positions	Sales
Title	Album details	KOR	Sales
Mix B	Released: March 21, 2017; Label: Bace Camp Studio; Formats: CD, digital download; Track listing: 1. Sign (Remastered) (feat. Loopy); 2. Taste the Party (K) (feat. Juvie Train); 3. Falling (feat. AKASTON); 4. Best Mistake (K); 5. Type (K) (feat. Kim Hyo-eun); 6. The Night (feat. Sean2Slow); 7. Not Lonely (외롭지 않아); 8. Taste the Party (E) (feat. SKULL); 9. Best Mistake (E); 10. Type (E) (feat. Mario Winans); 11. Falling (Inst.); 12. Taste the Party (K) (Inst.); 13. Best Mistake (Inst.)	49	—N/a

=== Extended plays ===
Title	Album details	Peak chart positions	Sales
Title	Album details	JPN	Sales
coll[a]ction	Released: October 17, 2018; Label: Pony Canyon; Formats: CD, digital download; Track listing: 1. Sign (Japanese Ver.) (feat. Jinmenusagi); 2. もう ひとりじゃない (Not Lonely); 3. Type (feat. Kim Hyo-eun); 4. Best Mistake; 5. Tomorrowland; 6. Luv Highway; 7. 車を止めて (A Midsummer Night's Dream); 8. Sign (Acoustic Ver.) (feat. Loopy)	—	—N/a
"—" denotes album did not chart.

=== Singles ===
Title	Year	Peak chart positions		Album
Title	Year	KOR	JPN	Album
Korean
"Sign" feat. Loopy	2016	—	—	Mix B
"Not Lonely" (외롭지 않아)	2016	—	—	Mix B
"Type" feat. Kim Hyo-eun	2017	—	—	Mix B
"Best Mistake"	2017	—	—	Mix B
"Tomorrowland"	2017	—	—	Non-album singles
"Luv Highway"	2018	67 (Note: The physical version of "Luv Highway" charted on the Gaon Album Chart.)	—	Non-album singles
"Red"	2018	—	—	Non-album singles
"Caffeine"	2018	—	—	Non-album singles
"& New"	2019	—	—	Non-album singles
"J.us.T"	2020	—	—	Non-album singles
Japanese
"Sign" feat. Jinmenusagi	2018	—	—	coll[a]ction
"Perfect 6th Sense"	2019	—	—	Non-album single
"—" denotes song did not chart or was not released in that region.

== Filmography ==
=== Web series ===
Year	Title	Role	Notes	Ref.
2020	Thumbs Up Feeds Me	Lee Eun-byul		

=== Reality television ===
Year	Title	Role	Notes	Ref.
2017–2018	MixNine	Contestant		
2019	Studio Vibes	Cast member		
