= Studio Vibes =

- Genre: Entertainment
- Starring: Shin Dong-yup; Kim Hee-chul; JeA; JooE; Eyedi
- Country of origin: South Korea
- Original language: Korean
- No. of episodes: 8

Production
- Running time: 90 minute

Original release
- Network: tvN
- Release: May 1 – June 19, 2019

Studio Vibes (Korean: 작업실) was a South Korean show. It aired on tvN on Wednesdays at 23:00 (KST).

== Format ==
Ten young musicians move together and are left to do whatever they want during the month the show is filmed with the hope they would create music together and find love in an unregulated environment.

== Host ==
- Shin Dong-yup
- Kim Hee-chul
- JeA
- JooE
- Cheetah (Special Host, Episode 5)

== Performers ==
Female

- Ko Sung-min
- Stella Jang
- Eyedi
- Chahee
- Jang Jae-in

Male

- Deepshower
- BIGONE
- Lee Woo
- Choi Nakta
- Nam Tae-hyun

== Rating ==
Ep. #	Air Date	Rating
1	May 1, 2019	0.6%
2	May 8, 2019	0.6%
3	May 15, 2019	0.3%
4	May 22, 2019	0.4%
5	May 29, 2019	0.3%
6	June 5, 2019	0.4%
7	June 12, 2019	0.4%
8	June 19, 2019	0.3%
