= Contiki (disambiguation) =

Contiki can refer to:

- Contiki, an open-source operating system designed for computers with limited memory.
- Contiki Tours, a series of bus holidays operated by Contiki Holidays for 18-35s.
- Con-Tici or Kon-Tiki, an old name for the Andean deity Viracocha

== See also ==
- Kontiki (disambiguation)
