= Better (Kim Hyung-jun song) =

"Better ベター"
- CD+DVD cover

Single by Kim Hyung-jun
- Released: November 19, 2014
- Genre: J-pop, R&B, Hip hop
- Label: Swave E&T
- Songwriter: Han Sang Won

Kim Hyung-jun singles chronology
"Long Night" (2011)	"Better ベター" (2014)

Music video
- "Better" on YouTube

"Better" (Japanese: ベター) is the second Japanese single by South Korean entertainer Kim Hyung-jun, after "Long Night". It was released on November 19, 2014, on the Swave E&T label. The single was also released on DVD.

== Background and development ==
Before "Better"'s release, Kim was active in Japan in 2013 with the release of "Always Love You" (featuring K-pop vocalist Kota) and in 2011 with the release of "Long Night". During the first half of 2014 he focused on his acting career, appearing on the television series Melody of Love, and gave concerts in South Korea and abroad. In the second half of the year, Kim prepared for the Japanese release of "Better" with diet and exercise.

== Description ==
The song, a combination of hip hop, rap and rhythm and blues, features Baby-J and Park Eun-young and was produced by Han Sang Won.

== Release and promotion ==
On October 10 Kim began a three-day Endless Story tour, organized by the Swave E&T label to promote his upcoming single, in Tokyo and Nagoya. In addition to performing "Better", he introduced its music video before its release. According to a spokesperson, the tour "confirm[ed] Kim Hyung Jun's unchanged popularity" and "[Kim] will gain even more fans after releasing his new single in November".

Kim had autograph-signing sessions and fan meetings in Japan's three largest cities: Tokyo, Nagoya and Osaka. Other promotional activities included a November 18–24 special event at Tower Records in Shibuya and a TV appearance on Han Love (韓ラブ). "Better" was released on November 19, 2014. After its release Kim continued his Endless Story tour until November 28, with seven shows in Tokyo, Nagoya and Osaka.

== Track listing ==
CD
No.	Title	Lyrics	Music	Arrangement	Length
1.	"Better" (ベター ～)	Han Sang Won, チェ・ガブォン, ハ・ジュヨン	Han Sang Won	Han Sang Won	3:25
2.	"写真帖 (Photo Book)" (Korean Version)	Han Sang Won, ドロップレット	Han Sang Won	Han Sang Won
3.	"Better" (Instrumental Ver.)		Han Sang Won	Han Sang Won	3:25
4.	"Photo Book" (Instrumental Ver.)	Han Sang Won	Han Sang Won

CD+DVD edition: Bonus DVD
No.	Title	Length
1.	"Better (Music video)"
2.	"Better (Making of music video)"

== Music video ==
The music video for "Better" was uploaded to YouTube on November 19, 2014. The four-minute, 23-second video was filmed primarily in black-and-white with red tinting. Kim's car was used, since the crew suggested that it would allow them to finish shooting on schedule.

In the video, Kim is "tortured by a lost love" and shots of him singing and dancing appear. Baby-J's rap parts were filmed separately. Between cuts, Kim, Baby-J and Eun Young dramatize the story. "Better" abruptly stops in the middle, and the video changes to full color before the car Kim is driving explodes. The song's title and Kim's name, as part of the closing credits, are superimposed over the explosion.

== After release ==
On January 17, 2015, two months after his Japanese single release, Kim performed at the Seoul Police Promotional Team's Music and Talk Concert with fellow SS501 members Kim Kyu-jong and Heo Young-saeng. Heo, who performed his national service with the Seoul police, invited the other two members to perform at the event.

On March 4, Kim signed with the CI Entertainment agency. His first promotional activity under the new management was a fan meeting in South Korea, Fan Night Live (FNL), at the Blue Square Samsung Concert Hall on April 25. Kim performed his own and SS501 songs (including tracks from the "Better" CD single), and mentioned plans for a solo album in July. Alberto Mondi, an actor and member of Kim's soccer team, hosted the fan question-and-answer segment.

== Release history ==
Country	Date	Distributing label	Format
Japan	November 19, 2014	SWAVE E & T	CD
Japan	November 19, 2014	SWAVE E & T	CD + DVD (limited edition A)
Japan	November 19, 2014	SWAVE E & T	CD + photobook (limited edition B)

== Charts ==
Chart	Peak
Japan Oricon Singles Chart	38
