= Bettermann =

Bettermann is a German surname. It may refer to one of these people:

- Daniel Bettermann (born 1980), German politician
- Erik Bettermann, director-general of Deutsche Welle from 2001 to 2013
- Hilda Bettermann (1942–2023), American politician, member of the Minnesota House of Representatives from 1991 to 1999

== See also ==
- Betterman (disambiguation)
- Bettelmann, a card game
