= A Better Man (TV series) =

2025 Norwegian television series

- Ølhunden Berit
- Genre: Psychological thriller; Dark comedy; Social satire
- Created by: Thomas Seeberg Torjussen
- Written by: Thomas Seeberg Torjussen
- Directed by: Thomas Seeberg Torjussen; Gjyljeta Berisha
- Starring: Anders Baasmo as Tom Hallsténsen; Ingrid Unnur Giæver as Live Stensvaag; Jonas Strand Gravli as Audun; Bente Børsum as Frida; Marit Synnøve Berg as Anniken
- Countries of origin: Norway; Lithuania
- Original language: Norwegian
- No. of seasons: 1
- No. of episodes: 4

Production
- Executive producer: Alec Thom (NRK)
- Producers: Synnøve Hørsdal; Christian Fredrik Martin
- Running time: approx. 51 minutes
- Production companies: Maipo Film; Artbox

Original release
- Network: NRK (Norway); ZDFneo (Germany)
- Release: 9 November 2025

A Better Man (Norwegian: Ølhunden Berit) is a 2025 Norwegian psychological thriller and dark comedy television series created, written, and directed by Thomas Seeberg Torjussen. The four-part series was produced by Maipo Film and Artbox for NRK in Norway, in co-production with ZDFneo in Germany, and international sales were handled by Beta Film.

The series is about Tom Hallsténsen (Anders Baasmo), a misogynistic internet troll who is exposed by hackers and forced to hide in women's clothing. It premiered in Norway on 9 November 2025, and in Germany on 18 November 2025 on ZDFneo and ZDFmediathek, where it was retitled Toxic Tom.

It had its world premiere at the 2025 Canneseries festival in April 2025, where it won Best Series and Best Performance.

== Plot ==
Tom Hallsténsen works in his mother's clothing store by day and trolls the internet by night. He posts anonymous misogynistic, racist and abusive comments online, targeting in particular Live Stensvaag (Ingrid Unnur Giæver), a stand-up comedian. When Live reads one of his messages aloud on television, hackers piece together Tom's real identity and publish his personal details. He becomes the country's most-hated figure overnight. With nowhere to go, Tom puts on women's clothing from the shop and starts living as a woman to stay hidden. Doing so changes what he sees and hears in ways he did not expect.

== Cast ==
- Anders Baasmo as Tom Hallsténsen
- Ingrid Unnur Giæver as Live Stensvaag
- Jonas Strand Gravli as Audun
- Bente Børsum as Frida
- Marit Synnøve Berg as Anniken
- Irena Sikorskytė

== Production ==
=== Development ===
Thomas Seeberg Torjussen, who previously made the Norwegian comedy series Norwegian Cosy and ZombieLars, wrote and directed the series. He told Variety that the idea came from "digging into the misogyny of men who are left behind in what I believe is the most progressive, gender-equal region of the world." Gjyljeta Berisha, known for The Lørenskog Disappearance and 22 July, co-directed.

The series was shot in Norway and Lithuania. Producers Synnøve Hørsdal and Christian Fredrik Martin made it at Maipo Film, which had previously produced Miss Julie (2014) and the NRK series State of Happiness (2018). Lithuania's Artbox co-produced. NRK executive producer Alec Thom oversaw the broadcaster's involvement.

Beta Film signed on as international distributor in April 2024, before the Canneseries premiere.

=== Casting ===
Anders Baasmo, who plays Tom, had previously appeared in Kon-Tiki (2012), The King's Choice (2016), and the NRK series La Palma (2022). Beta Film presented the series at MIPCOM 2024 as "an internet troll redemption tale" with Baasmo in the lead.

The series was also selected for the Series Competition of the Geneva International Film Festival (GIFF).

== Reception ==
=== Critical response ===
Writing for Cineuropa, Fabien Lemercier praised Baasmo's performance and noted the series does not soften Tom or offer him easy redemption. The review described A Better Man as a dark and often comic look at online misogyny, with the disguise plot used to put the protagonist in situations that expose rather than explain what drives him.

Christina Karakondylou of philenews wrote "It's worth watching. It is a stunning, captivating audiovisual experience that will stay with you long after the series ends."

=== Accolades ===
Year	Award	Category	Result
2025	2025 Canneseries	Best Series	Won
2025	2025 Canneseries	Best Performance (Anders Baasmo)	Won
2025	2025 Canneseries	High School Award for Best Series	Won
2025	Serielizados – Barcelona Series Festival	Best International Series	Won
2025	Serielizados – Barcelona Series Festival	Audience Award	Won
2026	Nordic Series Script Award	Best Series	Nominated
