= Long Night (Kim Hyung-jun song) =

"眠れない夜 -Long Night-"

Single by Kim Hyung-jun
- Released: July 27, 2011
- Genre: J-pop
- Label: Avex Trax
- Songwriters: Aya Harukazu, RADO

Music video
- "Long Night" on YouTube

"Long Night" (Japanese: 眠れない夜, Hepburn: nemurenai yoru; lit. "sleepless night") is Kim Hyung-jun's first Japanese single, which was released on July 27, 2011 under Avex Entertainment. The single is also available in DVD version.

== Background and development ==
In January 2011, Kim Hyung-jun held a fan event at the Tokyo Shinagawa Stellar Ball. During the event, he announced he signed under Avex Entertainment for his future Japanese activities. In March, Kim released his first solo mini album My Girl in South Korea, marking his debut as a solo artist. He also released its Japanese version under Avex on April 6, then he continued touring around Asia to promote his album until early July.

Later on, he announced that he will be officially debuting as a solo artist in Japan with his upcoming single release, "Long Night". He mentioned that the single would produce a cool and comfortable feeling because it will be released in the summer. Since he would be performing solo from now on and the lyrics are written in Japanese language, however, he mentioned that it would be more difficult for him to be able to express the meaning and feeling of the single properly.

== Release and promotion ==
Kim Hyung Jun's first Japanese single "Long Night" was released on July 27, 2011. Upon the release of his first Japanese single album, Kim started promoting around Japan, which included promotions in Japanese televisions. Starting two days after its release, he held an autograph session at the Abeno Cues Town in Osaka, Sunshine Sakae Grand Canyon Square in Nagoya, and Tower Records in Shibuya on July 29, July 30, and July 31 respectively. The organizers limited the participants to 1500 people only as to be able to have a more intimate and closer moments with Kim.

In August, Kim toured in Tokyo, Osaka, and Aichi Prefecture accordingly for his "Kim Hyung Jun Tour Summer Festival". He performed his solo songs from his My Girl mini album, as well as some songs from SS501 era, including "UR Man". He also had a question-and-answer portion as well as a chance to talk with his fans, even mimicking a segment from his regular radio program "Music High" in South Korea while socializing with the audience. The venues of the event were held at the Differ Ariake Arena, Zepp Osaka, and Aichi Meitetsu Hall on August 19, August 24, and August 28 respectively. In between his Japanese tour, however, Kim also participated in releasing an OST for Korean drama Hooray for Love entitled "Indecisive".

== Tracks ==
"Ame Ni Utarete" ("Midnight Passes") was originally a Korean single used as an original soundtrack for 2011 SBS Korean drama Lie to Me starring his co-label mate Kang Ji-hwan and Yoon Eun-hye. The upbeat melody of the song contrasts with the sad lyrics, depicting an appearance of a man overcoming a heartbreak positively. The title track "Long Night", on the other hand, is also an upbeat, dance song, representing a man's charm to pursue a woman. A Korean version of "Long Night" (Korean: 잠 못 드는 밤) was released on the soundtrack of My Shining Girl in 2012, a KBS drama wherein Kim, himself, was the main lead.

The CD includes two singles and instrumental versions of each song, as well as limited DVD edition, which includes the music video of the title track and its making.

=== Track listing ===
CD
No.	Title	Lyrics	Music	Length
1.	"眠れない夜" (Long Night)	Aya Harukazu	RADO	3:18
2.	"雨にうたれて (Ame Ni Utarete)" (Midnight Passes)	Aya Harukazu	BRAVE Brothers	3:31
3.	"眠れない夜 -Long Night-" (Instrumental Ver.)		RADO	3:18
4.	"雨にうたれて (Ame Ni Utarete)" (Instrumental Ver.)		BRAVE Brothers	3:31

CD+DVD edition: Bonus DVD
No.	Title	Length
1.	"眠れない夜 -Long Night- (Music video)"
2.	"眠れない夜 -Long Night- (Making of music video)"

== Music videos ==
- "眠れない夜 -Long Night-"

== Release history ==
Country	Date	Distributing label	Format
Japan	July 27, 2011	Avex Trax	digital download
Japan	July 27, 2011	Avex Trax	CD
Japan	July 27, 2011	Avex Trax	CD+DVD

== Charts ==
Chart	Country	Peak
Oricon Singles Chart	Japan	30
