= Better (British TV series) =

British television drama

- Genre: Crime drama
- Created by: Jonathan Brackley; Sam Vincent
- Written by: Jonathan Brackley; Sam Vincent; Nick Ahad
- Directed by: Jonathan Brough; Pier Wilkie
- Starring: Leila Farzad; Andrew Buchan; Samuel Edward-Cook; Zak Ford-Williams; Olivia Nakintu; Cel Spellman; Anton Lesser; Garry Cooper
- Composer: Samuel Sim
- Country of origin: United Kingdom
- Original language: English
- No. of series: 1
- No. of episodes: 5

Production
- Executive producers: Jonathan Brackley; Sam Vincent; Lucy Dyke; Nawfal Faizullah; Mona Qureshi; Jane Featherstone; Chris Fry
- Producer: James Dean
- Running time: 59 minutes
- Production company: Sister

Original release
- Network: BBC One
- Release: 13 February – 13 March 2023

Better is a British crime drama television drama series, created and written by Jonathan Brackley and Sam Vincent, about a corrupt police officer who attempts to turn her life around, only for it to get much worse. The series began broadcast on BBC One on 13 February 2023, with all five episodes available on BBC iPlayer simultaneously.

== Premise ==
After her son Owen almost dies, corrupt police detective Lou Slack attempts to make amends for her sins and escape Col McHugh, the powerful criminal she has been working for.

== Cast and characters ==
=== Main ===
- Leila Farzad as DI Lou Slack
- Andrew Buchan as Col McHugh
- Samuel Edward-Cook as Ceri Davies
- Zak Ford-Williams as Owen Davies
- Olivia Nakintu as DC Esther Okoye
- Cel Spellman as Donal McHugh
- Anton Lesser as Vernon Marley
- Garry Cooper as Peter "Bulgey" Donovan

=== Recurring ===
- Carolin Stoltz as Alma McHugh
- Lucy Black as DCI Sandy Mosby
- Moe Bar-El as Artem
- Mark Monero as Curtis "Lord" Roy
- Junade Khan as DS Pritam Khan
- Joseph Steyne as Joleon
- Tillie Amartey as Jade Wilkes
- Gavin Spokes as DI Phil Cowper

== Episodes ==
No.	Title	Directed by	Written by	Original release date	UK viewers (millions)
1	"Episode 1"	Jonathan Brough	Jonathan Brackley and Sam Vincent	13 February 2023	4.69
Lou Slack recovers a firearm from a gangland shooting on behalf of businessman Col McHugh. A few days later she attends a party at McHugh's house, during which time her son Owen contracts meningitis and her husband Ceri takes him to hospital.
2	"Episode 2"	Jonathan Brough	Jonathan Brackley and Sam Vincent	20 February 2023	3.75
Owen is using a wheelchair and attends a support group, which McHugh sends his son Donal to infiltrate. Slack tracks down retired officer Vernon Marley who has experience of the West Yorkshire organised crime world.
3	"Episode 3"	Jonathan Brough	Jonathan Brackley and Sam Vincent	27 February 2023	3.61
During a vehicle stop on the Malik gang, Slack plants drugs in their car which DC Esther Okoye notices.
4	"Episode 4"	Pier Wilkie	Nick Ahad, Jonathan Brackley and Sam Vincent	6 March 2023	3.49
To keep Okoye on her side, Slack sets up McHugh for an arrest but Okoye finds nothing incriminating on his person. Slack and McHugh have a showdown but he agrees to let her go. Later at Marley's house, McHugh's associate Bulgey tries to kill her but Marley shoots him first.
5	"Episode 5"	Jonathan Brough	Jonathan Brackley and Sam Vincent	13 March 2023	3.75
Marley is killed in prison by one of McHugh's associates. Slack and McHugh agree to hand themselves in to the Police.

== Production ==
This is the first on-screen drama where a disabled actor showed that by masking their own condition and then revealing it they could portray a progressive condition.

== Broadcast ==
Better premiered on BBC One on 13 February 2023, with all five episodes available on BBC iPlayer simultaneously.

== Reception ==
Sean O'Grady from The Independent gave the first episode four out of five stars, praising Farzad and Buchan. Rebecca Nicholson of The Guardian awarded the first episode three stars out of five, criticising the opening but finding it gained momentum by the end. Anita Singh in The Daily Telegraph also gave it three stars out of five, unimpressed by the plot.
