= Babel 250 =

South Korean reality television series

- Promotional poster
- Genre: Reality television
- Directed by: Lee Won-hyoung
- Starring: Lee Ki-woo; Matheus Olivério da Silva Rêgo; Nicolas Portier; Tanon Varaya; Angelina Danilova; Michelle Marie Bertolini Araque; Chen Lin; Up Poompat
- Country of origin: South Korea
- Original language: Korean

Production
- Running time: 60 minutes
- Production companies: Creative Group Gamja; Urban Works Media

Original release
- Network: tvN
- Release: July 11 – September 27, 2016

Babel 250 (Korean: 바벨250) is a South Korean reality television program on tvN, which first aired on July 11, 2016. The show features a cast of four men and three women, all from different countries, who live together as an experiment, speaking their own languages and attempting to create a universal one. The show's title is loosely based on the story of the Tower of Babel and 250 families of languages currently in use in the world.

On September 27, 2016, the first season ended with Episode 12.

== Background ==
The concept of the show is a global language project showing what happens when six foreigners living together with one native, in South Korea, must create a lingua franca or "common language", by using their own native languages, not just Korean, and not English. The cast members are from South Korea, Brazil, France, Thailand, Russia, Venezuela and China. Only the South Korean member speaks Korean, and only the Thai and Chinese members have visited South Korea. In an interview with Yonhap, Program Director (PD) Lee Won-hyoung said the ultimate goal was to create a "new world" and mentioned the possibility of "unexpected love lines" developing among the cast.

For the first episode they gathered to live in a southern town they called "Babel 250", the real town of Darengyi in Namhae County, along the South Sea. They elect a leader every day, eat their meals together and attempt to work together in community life and mutual understanding. They initially communicate using their own languages, their eyes and other body language. On the second episode the show's many language interpreters assist the cast, via headphones, as they acquaint themselves with each other.

Filming for the show ended the week the second episode was aired. By that time, South Korean cast member Lee Ki-woo said communicating had become much easier. He said, "We could tell what the other person wanted just from their eyes and expressions," and, "I began to understand that language and nationality are not that important."

On July 25, 2016, the date of the airing of the third episode, PD Lee said in a press conference that their new language "Babel" was not really possible, adding, "We wanted to show that people can communicate with a limited vocabulary like we do with English when we travel." He said the first three episodes were a struggle for the cast getting to know one another, but they would start forming their new language in the fourth episode.

== Cast ==
Producers selected the cast after three months of searching Google and other social networks. Brazil's Matheus Olivério da Silva Rêgo is a samba dancer whose school would soon perform at the opening and closing ceremonies of the 2016 Summer Olympics. China's Chen Lin is a professional concert planner, whose concerts have included Jackie Chan's. France's Nicolas Portier is an actor. Russia's Angelina is an interior design college major who likes windsurfing and horseback riding. South Korea's Lee Ki-woo is a film, drama and variety show actor. Thailand's Tanon Varaya has investments in real estates, renting and restaurant operations, and has a luxury philosophy. Venezuela's Michelle Marie Bertolini Araque placed second in the Miss Venezuela 2013 beauty pageant and retired from tennis playing after a knee injury.

On August 15, 2016, the date of the airing of the sixth episode, Tanon Varaya had to leave the show midway for health reasons, which he shared in a videotaped farewell. He was replaced by Thailand's Poompat Iam-samang, a student and drum major at Chulalongkorn University and active on social media with the nickname "Up Poompat." The newcomer was previewed by media as the show's new 'flower boy'.

=== Current members ===
Country	Name	Name in hangul	Birthday	Episodes
Brazil	Matheus Olivério da Silva Rêgo	마테우스	August 25, 1987 (age 38)	1–6
China	Chen Lin	천린	October 11, 1989 (age 36)	1–6
France	Nicolas Portier	니콜라 포르티에	December 24, 1982 (age 43)	1–12
Russia	Angelina Danilova	안젤리나 다닐로바	December 28, 1996 (age 29)	1–12
South Korea	Lee Ki-woo	이기우	October 23, 1981 (age 44)	1–12
Thailand	Tanon Varaya	타논 바라야	June 19, 1978 (age 48)	1–6
Venezuela	Michelle Marie Bertolini Araque	미셸 마리에 베르톨리니 아라케	June 15, 1994 (age 32)	1–12
Thailand	Poompat Iam-samang (Up)	업 (본명 : 푸미팟 이앙쌈앙)	December 4, 1994 (age 31)	6–12

== 2016 episode summary (1–present) ==
Ep.#	Date	Summary
1	July 11	Meet in Namhae County settlement; labor in rice planting field, transport chickens and build chicken coop.
2	July 18	Get acquainted meeting with interpreters' help; Lin and Nicolas work in anchovy fishery; rest of cast play at beach and town.
3	July 25	Ki-woo, Angelina (grocery shop); Lin, Nicolas (anchovy fishing); Ki-woo, Matheus (eel fishing); Lin sick visit to hospital; meeting and meal all together.
4	August 1	Ki-woo, Matheus (eat eel); Lin, Nicolas (grocery shop, cook); Angelina (shares face masks), Ki-woo, Nicolas (build fire); catch chickens, meeting and meal together.
5	August 8	Matheus, Michelle (seaside walk); Matheus, Angelina (garlic field work); Tanon, Michelle (chicken farm work); Ki-woo (fishing/handyman work); meeting, and meal all together with visiting neighbors.
6	August 15	Matheus (samba lessons); Lin, Ki-woo, Tanon, Angelina, Nicolas (beach); Matheus, Michelle (fishing/cooking); (Vacation break to homes); Tanon sick farewell, introduce new member Up.
7	August 22	Ki-woo, Up (goat farm work); Matheus, Lin, Michelle (wine and music); Michelle telephones Tanon; all prepare and join in dinner and drinking party.
8	August 29	Matheus, Lin (temple stay/work); Anjelina, Michelle, Up, Ki-woo, Nicolas (wash clothes/housework/play at home); all share dinner and make-up/beauty contest for males.
9	September 6	Up (DJ cast wake-up); Matheus, Michelle, Angelina (farm work/gift injeolmi to neighbors); Ki-woo, Nicolas, Lin, Up (traditional Korean medicine); all dinner/meeting; Ki-woo, Matheus, Angelina, Up (fishing/beach).
10	September 13	Lin (leads tai chi exercises), Angelina, Up (wall painting/cooking), Tanon (video message reveals real-life dating with Michelle, Matheus is heartbroken), Kiwoo, Matheus (make scarecrows and makgeolli), Michelle, Lin, Nicolas (paint t-shirts), Ki-woo/Lin vs. Matheus/Michelle (dodgeball), Michelle vs. Ki-woo/Nicolas (tennis), Lin (gifts cards), meal and meeting all together.
11	September 20	Matheus, Anjelina (farm work/ride bicycle); Kiwoo, Lin, Michelle (inflatable boat fishing); Nicolas, Up (traditional Korean medicine/restaurant work); Michelle (phone chat with Tanon); Michelle, Up (pick corn); cleaning, cooking, meal and meeting all together.
12	September 27	All (beach day/dinner at home); Tanon visits (romantic walk with Michelle); all visit village neighbors, share native foods and hold tearful farewell meeting with interpreters.

== Ratings and reception ==
On the show's debut, Chosun Ilbo writer Lee Seung-mi pointed out the obvious comparison (and competition) of this new cable television show, with the recently re-organized older cable television show, JTBC's Non-Summit, that also has foreign cast members, and airs on the same night.

In August 2016, PD Lee was contacted by linguist Mark Dingemanse from the Max Planck Institute for Psycholinguistics praising the show's concept and value for human communication and language studies; and proposing a future collaboration.

=== Cast popularity ===
In 2016, Angelina Danilova appeared as an actress in Hanhae and Jung Eun-ji's music video "EYESCREAM(여름, 아이스크림)". In 2017, Angelina Danilova appeared as an actress in Eddy Kim's music video "Heart pound(쿵쾅대)". In 2019, Angelina Danilova appeared as an actress in Swings (rapper)'s music video "Usain Bolt(우사인볼트)".

On January 17, 2018, The Corea Image Communication Institute (CICI) selected Angelina Danilova as the 2018 recipient of the Korea Image Flower Stone Award for her work promoting Korea to the world. Fellow recipients that day included Sohn Kyung Shik, chairman of CJ Group, the food and media conglomerate, and Joachim Son-Forget, the first Korean-born member of the French National Assembly. Past award winners of CICI Korea Image Awards include K-pop stars Psy and Rain, maestro Chung Myung-whun, jazz singer Nah Youn-sun, Chinese actress Tang Wei, the Chairman & CEO of Amorepacific Corporation Suh Kyung-bae, Kwangjuyo President Cho Tae-kwon, former Secretary-General of the United Nations Ban Ki-moon, France's Digital Economy Minister Fleur Pellerin, golfer Pak Se-ri, skater Shim Suk-hee, ballet dancer Park Sae-eun, YouTubers Josh Carrott and Ollie Kendal, Samsung Galaxy Android series of smartphones and Google's AlphaGo.

Angelina Danilova made her solo singing debut with the digital single "As You Are" on January 17, 2020.
