= Always Love You =

Single by Kim Hyung-jun
- Released: August 13, 2013
- Genre: K-pop, R&B
- Length: 3:27
- Label: S-PLUS
- Songwriters: Jang Young-wan, Tae Bong-I, Iyuna
- Producers: Kim Hyung-jun, LOEN Entertainment

Kim Hyung-jun Korean singles chronology
"Sorry, I'm Sorry" (2012)	"Always Love You" (2013)

Music video
- "Always Love You" on YouTube "Always Love You" teaser on YouTube

"Always Love You" (Korean: 우리 둘이) is a song by South Korean singer Kim Hyung-jun featuring Sunny Hill's Kota, released on August 13, 2013. The mid-tempo ballad song, which was made available during the time of summer, was co-produced by Kim himself.

The accompanying music video was filmed by directors Kim Do Yeon and Park Jong Chul.

== Background and development ==
"Always Love You" was written by composers Jang Young-wan (장영완) and Tae Bong-i (태봉이) with additional writing by lyricist Iyuna (이유나). The song was produced by Kim Hyung-jun, himself with the help of LOEN Entertainment and his label S-Plus Entertainment.

On August 8, a 47-second video teaser was uploaded onto both LOEN Entertainment's official YouTube account and Kim's personal account. The song features Kim singing an R&B duet with the main vocalist of K-pop girl group Sunny Hill, Kota, who was also featured on the promotional video.

== Release and promotion ==
One week after his agency's announcement, Kim released the song in a digital single download format on August 13. The music video was also uploaded both onto Kim's official YouTube channel and LOEN Entertainment's channel on the same day.

On October 19, Kim flew to Japan for a fan meeting and live showcase in the country promoting his single in Japanese language. The showcase was held at Shibuya Public Hall, Tokyo on October 20, followed by a handshake and high-touch event in Tokyo for the next two days. He then flew back to Korea right after the event on the 22nd in preparation for the premieres of his film An Actor Is An Actor and KBS Melody of Love television series on October 24 and November 4 respectively.

On October 23, the Japanese version of the single was released in Japan. The single ranked 9th on Oricon's Top 10 Daily Charts right away on the day of its release.

== Music video ==
=== Background ===
The teaser for the video, released on August 8, first showed Kim Hyung-jun riding an airplane to see the top view of Hanseo University's airfield. It then showed him having fun with his friends on a summer trip while playing the single in the background. Kota was also shown in the video, both seen singing with Kim together and interacting with their friends.

Kim Do Yeon, who was behind the music videos of IU's "Last Fantasy" and Wanted's "Going To You", and movie director Park Jong Chul, who worked for films Arrow, The Ultimate Weapon and The Temperature of Romance were the directors of the music video. The official music video was released on August 13, 2013.

=== Synopsis ===
The song is an acoustic medium R&B produced by Kim himself, while the music video has an innocent love story theme, filmed on Hanseo University' airfield, and even capturing sights in the sky.

The video, running for three minutes and thirty-nine seconds, begins a sound of a car engine starting and a still image of an airplane plushie hanging on the rear-view mirror; Kim Hyung-jun and Kota are inside the car with Kim driving it, ready to have a vacation. After the song title is displayed, Kim and his friends start to run from the beach side towards an ice cream vendor, who puts his hand out to stop them. They then start to line up with Kim behind them all. Their faces show anticipation and craving for the ice cream while the vendor takes his time preparing the dessert. A time lapse of the beach-side starting from the afternoon until the evening pops out, finishing the song introduction. Kota begins the song, her friends dancing around in the background, then cuts to a scene wherein she and Kim are sharing one ice cream cone and looking at each other afterwards. Kim then sings his part of the verse with the video continuing the ice cream scene wherein Kota pushes the food towards Kim's face.

The video then cuts to several close-ups with Kim and Kota, as well as scenes featuring both of them with their friends having fun on the seaside and dancing around the bonfire. During the second chorus at around two minutes and ten seconds, a plane taking off the runway is seen. Seconds later, the video cuts between Kim inside the plane as well as the scenery of the island and Hanseo University' airfield.

The video ends with the back view of Kim and Kota sitting on the sand and watching the sunset over sea with their Korean names seen below the "우리둘이" song title.

== Track listing ==
=== Korea edition ===
No.	Title	Lyrics	Music	Arrangement	Length
1.	"Always Love You"	Jang Young-wan (장영완), Tae Bong-i (태봉이), Iyuna (이유나)	Jang Young-wan (장영완), Tae Bong-i (태봉이)	Tae Bong-i (태봉이), Iyuna (이유나)	3:27
2.	"Always Love You" (instrumental)		Jang Young-wan (장영완), Tae Bong-i (태봉이)	Iyuna (이유나)	3:27

=== Japan edition ===
No.	Title	Lyrics	Music	Arrangement	Length
1.	"Always Love You" (Japanese edition)		Jang Young-wan (장영완), Tae Bong-i (태봉이)	Iyuna (이유나)	3:27
2.	"Always Love You" (Korean edition)	Jang Young-wan (장영완), Tae Bong-i (태봉이), Iyuna (이유나)	Jang Young-wan (장영완), Tae Bong-i (태봉이)	Iyuna (이유나)	3:27
3.	"Always Love You" (Instrumental)		Jang Young-wan (장영완), Tae Bong-i (태봉이)	Iyuna (이유나)	3:27

Type A
No.	Title	Length
1.	"Making of "Always Love You" music video"

Type B
No.	Title	Length
1.	"Photobook"

== Charts ==
Chart	Country	Peak position	Sales
Gaon Weekly Digital Charts	South Korea	72	
Gaon Weekly Download Charts	South Korea	57	24 497
Oricon Top 10 Daily Charts	Japan	9	
Oricon Weekly Charts	Japan	30	

== Credits ==
- Kim Hyung-jun and Kota – vocals
- Miho – Piano, string arranger
- Jyeong Suwan (정수완) – guitar
- Yung Seuteu Ling (융스트링) – string
- Park Chan (박찬) and Sin Sujin (신수진) – chorus
- Jang Young-wan (장영완) – composer and lyricist
- Tae Bong-i (태봉이) – composer, lyricist, and arranger
- Iyuna (이유나) – lyricist and arranger
- Kang Haegu (강해구) – recording engineer
- 박힉 – mixing engineer
- Gik Hyoyeong (칙효영) – mastering engineer

Credits adapted from "Always Love You" liner notes.
