= Lee Ki-woo =

South Korean actor

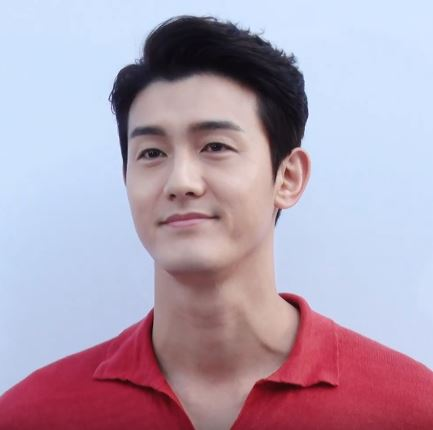
- Lee in June 2019
- Born: October 23, 1981 (age 44); Seoul, South Korea
- Education: Dankook University (B.A. in Business Administration) (M.B.A. in Arts and Cultural Management)
- Occupation: Actor
- Agent: Neverdie Entertainment
- Spouse: Unknown (m. 2022)

Korean name
- Hangul: 이기우
- Hanja: 李己雨
- RR: I Giu
- MR: I Kiu

Lee Ki-woo (Korean: 이기우; born October 23, 1981) is a South Korean actor. He is best known for his roles in The Classic (2003), Tale of Cinema (2005), A Love to Kill (2005), Flower Boy Ramyun Shop (2011), Rain or Shine (2017–2018), and My Liberation Notes (2022).

== Personal life ==
=== Military service ===
Lee enlisted for his mandatory military service on November 9, 2009, and after 22 months of active duty at the Armed Forces Seoul Hospital, he was discharged on September 1, 2011.

=== Relationship and marriage ===
On August 23, 2022, Lee's agency announced that he would marry his girlfriend in September on Jeju Island. They married in a private ceremony on September 24, 2022, on Jeju Island, where only family members and friends attended.

== Philanthropy ==
In November 2022, Lee donated a television appearance fee to a shelter for stray dogs.

== Filmography ==
=== Film ===
Year	Title	Role	Notes	Ref.
2003	The Classic	Yoon Tae-soo		
2004	Windstruck	Prince 4	cameo	
2004	Spin Kick	Seok-bong		
2004	He Was Cool	Kim Han-sung		
2005	Tale of Cinema	Jeon Sang-won		
2005	Sad Movie	Sang-gyu		
2006	Lost in Love	Sang-sik		
2006	Woman on the Beach	Beach resort caretaker		
2007	Ballet Shoes	Lee Ki-woo	short film	
2007	Skeletons in the Closet	Jin-sung		
2007	Someone Behind You	Park Hyun-joong		
2008	Crazy Waiting	Gi-seong	cameo	
2008	Story of Wine	Min-sung		
2008	Lost and Found	Kang Min-woo		
2010	Wedding Dress	Ji-hoon		
2011	Sin of a Family	Detective Lee Tae-heon		
2013	Bean Sprouts	Il-hong		
2014	Shot Gun	Detective		
2015	Time Renegades	Detective Lee		
2016	Misbehavior	Choi Min-ho		
TBA	Exposure	Sang-woo		

=== Television series ===
Year	Title	Role	Notes	Ref.
2004	Not Alone	Lee Ki-woo		
2005	A Love to Kill	Kim Joon-sung		
2006	Outrageous Women	Jang Woo-jin ("Rookie")		
2007	Kid Gang	Lee Kal-nal		
2008	Star's Lover	Jung Woo-jin		
2011	Cool Guys, Hot Ramen	Choi Kang-hyuk		
2012	My Shining Girl	Idol singer	cameo (episode 6)	
2012	Standby	Ryu Ki-woo		
2013	The Virus	Kim Se-jin		
2013	Miss Korea	Lee Yoon		
2014	Flower Grandpa Investigation Unit	Park Tae-min		
2016	Memory	Shin Young-Jin		
2016	The Doctors	Gong Byeong-doo	cameo (episode 1–5,9)	
2017	The Lady in Dignity	Kang Ki-ho		
2017–2018	Rain or Shine	Seo Joo-won		
2018–2019	Fates & Furies	Jin Tae-oh		
2019	Doctor Detective	Choi Tae-young		
2020	18 Again	Choi Il-kwon		
2022	My Liberation Notes	Jo Tae-hoon		
2022	Shooting Stars	Ahn Jun-ho	Cameo (episode 3)	
2023	Agency	Jung Jae-hoon	Cameo	
2023	Miraculous Brothers	Lee Myung-seok		
2024	Knight Flower	Park Yoon-hak		
TBA	Four Men	Kang Il-kwon		

=== Television show ===
Year	Title	Role	Notes	Ref.
2011	Food Essay	Host		
2013	Playing Oppa	Host		
2014	Friends in Macau	Host		
2015	Real Men Season 2	Cast Member		
2016	Babel 250	Cast Member		
2017	Battle Trip	Contestant	with Lee Yi-kyung (episodes 42–45)	
2023	The Wedding War	Host		

=== Music video appearances ===
Year	Song title	Artist
2002	"100 Days"	Naul
2006	"Living One Year in Winter"	Brian Joo
2009	"Staying Away"	KCM
2012	"Just Let It Go" + "Bad Guy Thing" + "Sorry I'm Sorry" (Escape EP)	Kim Hyung-jun
2012	"Memory of the Wind"	Naul
2018	"My Apology Letter"	Kim Yeon-woo

== Awards and nominations ==
Name of the award ceremony, year presented, category, nominee of the award, and the result of the nomination
Award ceremony	Year	Category	Nominee / Work	Result	Ref.
Asia Model Festival Awards	2013	Model Star Award	Lee Ki-woo	Won	
Korea Jewelry Awards	2008	Emerald Award	Lee Ki-woo	Won	
Korea Drama Awards	2016	Hot Star Award	Memory	Won	
Korea Drama Awards	2022	Excellence Award, Actor	My Liberation Notes	Won	
