= Kontiki (disambiguation) =

Kon-Tiki was the name of the raft used in the 1947 Thor Heyerdahl-led journey across the Pacific Ocean.

Kontiki or Kon-Tiki may also refer to:

== Kon-Tiki expedition ==
- Kon-Tiki expedition, a 1947 Thor Heyerdahl-led journey by raft across the Pacific Ocean
  - The Kon-Tiki Expedition: By Raft Across the South Seas, a 1948 book by Thor Heyerdahl about the expedition
  - Kon-Tiki (1950 film), a 1950 documentary about the expedition
  - Kon-Tiki (2012 film), a 2012 Norwegian film depicting the expedition
  - Kon-Tiki Museum, a Norwegian museum devoted to the expedition

== Music ==
- Kon Tiki (album), an album by Cotton Mather
- "Kon-Tiki" (song), a song by the Shadows
- "Kontiki", an electronic dance music song by Hardwell and Dannic

== Other uses ==
- Kontiki (company), a peer-assisted content delivery company
- Kontiki (computer), a 1980s Norwegian computer system
- Kon-Tiki (Scouting), an annual Scout raft building competition held in South Africa and Australia
- Con-Tici or Kon-Tiki, an old name for the Andean deity Viracocha
- A small craft used to pull a longline fishing line out to sea from the shore

== See also ==
- Contiki (disambiguation)
