= My Girl (EP) =

- My Girl (Korea edition) cover

EP by Kim Hyung-jun
- Released: 8 March 2011
- Genre: K-pop
- Label: S-Plus Entertainment; CJ E&M Music (Korea); Avex Trax (Japan); Universal Music Taiwan (Taiwan)
- Producer: E-Tribe, RADO, Kim Hyung-jun

Kim Hyung-jun chronology
My Girl (2011)	Escape (2012)

Music video
- "oH! aH!" on YouTube

My Girl is the solo mini album debut of Kim Hyung-jun of South Korean boy band SS501. It was released on 8 March 2011 under S-Plus Entertainment and distributed by CJ E&M Music. The album was also released in Japan and Taiwan.

== Background and development ==
Kim Hyung-jun signed under S-Plus Entertainment after he left SS501's former agency DSP Media in mid-2010. Upon the release of the news, his new agency mentioned that despite doing solo activities from now on, his top priority would still be taking part in group activities with SS501. Kim then signed with Avex Entertainment for his future Japanese activities.

Following Park Jung-min who was the first member of SS501 to debut individually, Kim Hyung-jun was second to announce that he would debut as a solo artist. The album was mostly produced by E-Tribe and RaDo, who are both known producers in the music industry. Kim was directly involved in penning the lyrics of the tracks on his first solo album as he aimed to deliver his message to his fans. The title of his album 'My Girl' implies the longing for love, but the meaning behind it, according to Kim, was to convey his gratitude towards his fans by staying with him through happy and tough times. (Note: Based on the Korean language: "솔로 활동이 힘들다는 것은 안다. 하지만 알면서도 힘든 순간 할 수 있었던 건 항상 나를 바라보며 외쳐주고 있는 팬들 덕분이었다")

== Release and promotion ==
A week before the album release, Kim held a showcase titled "1st Solo Mini Album Showcase" on 3 March 2011. A press conference was held before the start of the showcase at 1pm on Seodaemun-gu, Seoul. The showcase included performing tracks from the upcoming album and screening their associated music videos to the attendees for the first time before its release. SS501 member Park Jung-min attended the event and talked with him in front of their fans during a segment of the showcase to show his support.

After a month and a half of Park Jung-min's debut release, Kim Hyung-jun officially released his debut solo mini album entitled My Girl on 8 March 2011. He also released the music videos for his lead tracks "oH aH!" and "Girl" at the same time. The album topped various music charts immediately, both in real-time and daily charts. It also received predominately favorable reviews besides its commercial success. Music critic No Jun-young (노준영) commented: "The album is worth it for those who expected it... [Kim Hyung-jun] will be a greater solo artist one day with a little more effort," (Note: Paraphrased from the Korean language: "이 정도 노래들이라면 정규 앨범도 기대할 만하다... 조금만 더 노력하면 대형 솔로 남자 아티스트의 계보를 이어받을 것으로 보인다".) while another agency stated: "The album showcases a new style different from SS501 days... the public gave a greater response than is expected." (Note: Paraphrased from the Korean language: "SS501 때와 다른 새로운 스타일을 만날 수 있을 것... 음원 공개 때보다 더 큰 반응이 기대된다".)

On 6 April 2011, a Japanese version of the album was released under Avex Entertainment with two Japanese versions of the two lead tracks as bonus tracks. Two days later, another version of the album was released in Taiwan under Universal Music Taiwan. The DVD album includes songs and music videos in Korean-language. The album eventually peaked at number 37 and number 1 on Japan's Oricon Charts and Taiwanese music charts respectively.

=== Asian Tour ===
Following his promotions in South Korea, Kim proceeded to toured Japan. Entitled "Kim Hyung Jun Japan Live Tour 2011", Kim promoted his album in Nagoya, Osaka, and Tokyo for weeks. He also performed in the "Fantastic K-POP Concert" in Jakarta on 19 June 2011 along with other Korean singers. The next day, he was featured on the front page of Indonesia's influential newspaper Sunday Post amongst other artists who performed that day due to his greater fan base and popularity in Indonesia. He continued touring in other countries for his sold out Asian tour including Singapore, Hong Kong and Taiwan in June and July.

== Tracks ==
Kim Hyung-jun's mini album includes a 47-second introduction song, showcasing the overall feel of the album. Both E-Tribe and RaDo produced two tracks each, including the lead tracks "oH aH!" and "Girl". Particularly, the former song was said to have "lacked popular appeal" initially by Kim, himself, but he then realized its potential afterwards. The album comes with two instrumental songs for the two lead tracks mentioned, while the Japanese release also includes the Japanese versions of those. Both the fourth and fifth tracks entitled "No Other Woman But You" and "Heaven", respectively, were penned by Kim Hyung-jun himself, dedicating the latter to the late Park Yong-ha. Park and Kim became friends during their Japanese promotions as they were both managed by Avex Entertainment. As Kim remembered Park who committed suicide less than a year before his album release, he started to think of the people whom he loved but who nonetheless had left him, leading him to write "Heaven" to express his feelings.

=== Track listing ===
CD

No.	Title	Lyrics	Music	Arrangement	Length
1.	"Angel - Ft. E-Tribe"	E-Tribe	E-Tribe, Jang Jun-ho	E-Tribe, Jang Jun-ho	00:47
2.	"oH! aH!"	E-Tribe, Kiggen	E-Tribe	E-Tribe	03:44
3.	"Girl"	RADO, Kim Na-young	RADO	RADO	03:19
4.	"다른 여자 말고 너 (No Other Woman But You) - Ft. Dok2"	Kim Hyung-jun, Dok2	RADO	RADO	03:04
5.	"Heaven"	Kim Hyung-jun	Kim Young-hwan	Chance of One Way	04:16
6.	"oH! aH!" (Instrumental Ver.)		E-Tribe	E-Tribe	03:45
7.	"Girl" (Instrumental Ver.)		RADO	RADO	03:17

Japan Jacket B edition: Bonus tracks
No.	Title	Music	Arrangement	Length
8.	"oH! aH!" (Japanese Ver.)	E-Tribe	E-Tribe
9.	"Girl" (Japanese Ver.)	RADO	RADO

DVD

Japan Jacket A edition: Bonus DVD
No.	Title	Length
1.	"oH! aH! (Music video)" (Japanese Ver.)

Taiwan edition: Bonus DVD
No.	Title	Length
1.	"Greetings to Fans"
2.	"oH! aH! (Music video)"
3.	"oH! aH! (Making of music video)"

== Music videos ==
Oh Yeon-seo was the lead actress behind the music video of "oH! aH!". Due to her various music video appearances alongside South Korean idols, including Kim Hyung-jun, she was dubbed as 'Idol Killer' by the media. On 27 February 2011, it was reported that Park Jung-min visited Kim during his music video filming. It was around midnight when Park visited him to show his support on the start of his solo career after mostly doing group activities in the past.

- "oH! aH!"
- "Girl"

== Release history ==
Country	Release date	Distributing label	Format
Worldwide	March 8, 2011	S-Plus Entertainment	Digital download
South Korea	March 8, 2011	S-Plus Entertainment; CJ E&M Music	CD
Japan	April 6, 2011	Avex Trax	CD+DVD (Jacket A)
Japan	April 6, 2011	Avex Trax	CD (Jacket B)
Japan	April 6, 2011	Avex Trax	CD+Photobook (Jacket C)
Taiwan	8 April 2011	Universal Music Taiwan	CD+DVD

== Charts ==
Chart	Country	Peak position	Notes
Gaon Weekly Single Charts	South Korea	32	"Girl"
Gaon Weekly Single Charts	South Korea	35	"oH! aH!"
Gaon Weekly Album Chart	South Korea	1	
Gaon Monthly Album Chart	South Korea	8	9,202
Oricon Singles Chart	Japan	37	
G-Music Combo Chart	Taiwan week 15 ( 8–14 April 2011)	7	
G-Music J-Pop Chart	Taiwan week 15 ( 8–14 April 2011)	1	
