= Secretly Greatly (TV series) =

2016 South Korean television program

- Also known as: Hidden Camera season 3
- Genre: Variety show
- Directed by: Park Chang-hoon; Ahn Soo-young; Oh Noo-ri
- Starring: Yoon Jong-shin; Lee Soo-geun; Kim Hee-chul; Lee Guk-joo; John Park
- Country of origin: South Korea
- Original language: Korean
- No. of episodes: 23

Production
- Running time: 70 minutes
- Production company: Munhwa Broadcasting Corporation

Original release
- Network: KBS2
- Release: December 4, 2016 – May 21, 2017

Related
- Sunday Night

Secretly Greatly (Korean: 은밀하게 위대하게; RR: Eunmilhage widaehage) is a 2016 South Korean television program starring by Yoon Jong-shin, Lee Soo-geun, Kim Hee-chul, Lee Guk-joo and John Park. It aired on MBC every Sundays at 18:45 (KST) starting December 4, 2016, forming part of MBC's Sunday Night lineup. It aired after King of Mask Singer and replaced Real Men. The last episode of this program was broadcast on May 21, 2017.

== Format ==
Secretly Greatly, also known as Hidden Camera (season 3), is a program related to Hidden Camera, which starred Lee Kyung-kyu from 1991 to 1992 (season 1) and 2005 to 2007 (season 2). The premise is to surprise South Korean celebrities in various situations, without any notice from the host and its producers.

== Hosts ==
- Yoon Jong-shin
- Lee Soo-geun
- Kim Hee-chul
- Lee Guk-joo
- John Park

== List of episodes ==
| Episode | Air date | Main guests | Special appearances | References |
2016
| 1 | December 4, 2016 | Seolhyun (AOA), Lee Juck | AOA (Choa, Jimin, Chanmi), Kang Min-kyung (Davichi) | |
| 2 | December 11, 2016 | Park Gun-hyung, Jinyoung (B1A4) | Hong Eun-hee, B1A4 | |
| 3 | December 18, 2016 | Solbi, Kangta | Park Na-rae, Kim Young-hee, Yang Se-chan, Lee Jin-ho, Shin Ah-ra (2016 Miss Korea – Sun) | |
| 4 | December 25, 2016 | Kim Young-chul, Kim Ji-ho | Kim Ho-jin | |
2017
| 5 | January 1, 2017 | Kim Heung-gook | Kim Gu-ra, Lee Sung-bae, Cha Ye-rin | |
| 6 | January 8, 2017 | Sandara Park, Lee Hoon | Thunder, Lee Won-hee | |
| 7 | January 15, 2017 | Lee Hyun-woo, Yoon Yoo-sun | Jo Woo-jong, Sa Mi-ja, Im Ji-eun, Hwang Je-sung | |
| 8 | January 22, 2017 | Kangnam, Lena Park | Kim Yong-gun, Don Spike | |
| 9 | January 29, 2017 | Jeong Bo-seok, Shindong (Super Junior) | Park Kwang-su, Lee Jong-won, Seo Ji-seok, Sung Dae-hyun, Shim Hyun-seop, Yoo Tae-woong, Lee Jeong-yong, Kim Shin-young, April (Jinsol, Chaekyung) | |
| 10 | February 5, 2017 | Ji Sang-ryeol | Lee Kye-in | |
| 11 | February 12, 2017 | Seohyun (Girls' Generation), Yook Joong-wan (Rose Motel) | Girls' Generation (Hyoyeon, Sooyoung), Kim Poong | |
| 12 | February 19, 2017 | Shoo (S.E.S.), Oh Yoon-ah | Kan Mi-youn, Jae Hee | |
| 13 | February 26, 2017 | DinDin | Lee Ji-hye | |
| 14 | March 5, 2017 | Lee Sang-min, Kim Wan-sun | Kim Il-joong, Lee Eun-gyeol | |
| 15 | March 26, 2017 (Note: Episode 15 was cancelled of broadcast on March 12, 2017 due to live broadcast about the former president Park Geun-hye's departure from the Blue House after her impeachment on March 10, 2017. This episode was also cancelled on March 19, 2017 due to broadcast two episodes of King of Mask Singer: the rest of episode 102 last Sunday and the new episode 103 this Sunday.) | Sung Hoon | Henry Lau (Super Junior-M) | |
| 16 | April 2, 2017 | Key (SHINee) | Jeong Jinwoon | |
| 17 | April 9, 2017 | Hong Jin-young, Kim Won-jun | Seol Woon-do, Jo Jeong-min, Hong Kyung-min | |
| 18 | April 16, 2017 | Hani (EXID), Joon Park (g.o.d) | EXID (LE, Hyelin, Jeonghwa), Sleepy (Untouchable) | |
| 19 | April 23, 2017 | Jung Eun-ji (Apink), Yoon Jung-soo | Huh Gak, Oh Ha-young (Apink), Im Hyung-joon | |
| 20 | April 30, 2017 | Lee Soo-kyung, Kim Soo-yong | Kim Jaewon, Kim Do-kyun | |
| 21 | May 7, 2017 | Yoon So-yi, Jinu (Jinusean) | Park Jin-hee, Sean (Jinusean) | |
| 22 | May 14, 2017 | Hyuna, Hyun Joo-yup | Rooftop Moonlight (Park Se-jin, Kim Yoon-joo), Triple H (Hui, E'Dawn), Kim Tae-woo (g.o.d) | |
| 23 | May 21, 2017 | Choi Min-soo | Kang Joo-eun (Choi Min-soo's wife) | |

== Ratings ==
In the table below, the blue numbers represent the lowest ratings and the red numbers represent the highest ratings.

| Episode # | Broadcast Date | TNmS Ratings | AGB Ratings |
2016
| 1 | December 4, 2016 | 7.9% | 6.8% |
| 2 | December 11, 2016 | 6.9% | 6.6% |
| 3 | December 18, 2016 | 9.0% | 8.2% |
| 4 | December 25, 2016 | 8.4% | 7.4% |
2017
| 5 | January 1, 2017 | 8.3% | 7.5% |
| 6 | January 8, 2017 | 8.0% | 7.6% |
| 7 | January 15, 2017 | 7.9% | 8.6% |
| 8 | January 22, 2017 | 7.1% | 7.4% |
| 9 | January 29, 2017 | 7.5% | 7.6% |
| 10 | February 5, 2017 | 8.5% | 8.9% |
| 11 | February 12, 2017 | 8.0% | 6.8% |
| 12 | February 19, 2017 | 7.3% | 7.6% |
| 13 | February 26, 2017 | 5.8% | 6.7% |
| 14 | March 5, 2017 | 6.6% | 7.9% |
| 15 | March 26, 2017 | 6.3% | 6.5% |
| 16 | April 2, 2017 | 5.7% | 4.9% |
| 17 | April 9, 2017 | 8.2% | 7.9% |
| 18 | April 16, 2017 | 6.4% | 5.8% |
| 19 | April 23, 2017 | 7.1% | 7.3% |
| 20 | April 30, 2017 | 4.6% | 5.2% |
| 21 | May 7, 2017 | 5.7% | 5.3% |
| 22 | May 14, 2017 | 6.6% | 6.2% |
| 23 | May 21, 2017 | 6.8% | 7.7% |

== Awards and nominations ==
| Year | Award | Category | Recipients | Result |
|---|---|---|---|---|
| 2017 | 17th MBC Entertainment Awards | Top Excellence Award in variety - Female | Lee Guk-joo | Nominated |
