= Escape (EP) =

ESCAPE
- Escape (Korea CD+photobook Ed.) cover

EP by Kim Hyung-jun
- Released: July 10, 2012
- Genre: K-pop
- Label: S-Plus Entertainment; Direct Media/Sony (Korea); Swave E&t (Japan); Warner Music Taiwan (Taiwan)

Kim Hyung-jun chronology
My Girl (2011)	ESCAPE (2012)

Music video
- "Sorry, I'm Sorry" on YouTube

Escape is Kim Hyung-jun's second Korean EP. It was released on July 10, 2012, by S-Plus Entertainment and distributed by Direct Media via Sony Music Korea. The album was also released in Japan and Taiwan.

The album contains five songs including an introduction track and its title track, "Sorry I'm Sorry".

== Background and development ==
After one year and four months since his last mini-album release, My Girl, Kim Hyung-jun tweeted on June 11, 2012, suggesting his music comeback with a tweet: "Okay, shall we slowly get started? Is Everyone ready? ^^ Let's go, go!" (Note: Translated from the Korean language: "자 슬슬 발동좀 걸어볼까나. 다들 준비됐나?^^ 달려달려!") accompanied by a photo with the text: "201207 KIM HYUNG JUN MINI ALBUM <ESCAPE>/20120629 MINI CONCERT & SHOWCASE", representing the release dates of his then-upcoming album and mini concert. The next week, Kim released a second photo teaser of his comeback, which shows the same text.

In addition with the photo teasers, Kim also announced his co-label mates Kang Ji-hwan and Lee Ki-woo's participation in his music video making. Directed by Cha Eun Taek, the actors were to star in Kim's 25-minute dramatic music video, presented with his other album tracks. On July 1, Kim released a drama teaser starring Lee Ki-woo, Kang Ji-hwan, and Kim, himself. The 68-second video shows the three of them engaged in violent gang fights and committing crimes for their girlfriends.

On July 4, Kim released a 50-second video teaser for his single "Sorry, I'm Sorry" music video, which will be the introduction in the final music video. The next day, he once again released through his YouTube account a 55-second video teaser, showing the snippets of his lead track, as well as parts of the scenes and dance.

== Release and promotion ==
On June 29, Kim launched a mini-concert at the AX-Korea, Gwangjang-dong, Seoul to showcase his upcoming album. His co-members Heo Young-saeng and Kim Kyu-jong attended his mini-concert and they went up on stage with him during the finale. In addition, Kim held a guerilla event on July 7 and 8 outside on the streets of Insadong, Myundong, Shinchun, and other streets in Seoul to promote his then pre-released album.

On July 9, Kim uploaded his "Sorry, I'm Sorry" music video through his YouTube account. The next day, the full album was released offline. Days later, Kim uploaded a 64-second drama teaser on his YouTube account featuring the story of Kang Ji-hwan's character. He released yet another 33-second drama teaser featuring the stories of Kim and Lee Ki-woo's characters next. Accompanied by the songs "Bad Guy" and "Just Let It Go" respectively, the videos shown are snippets to promote his DVD release on July 13, wherein the full drama was only made available offline through buying the DVD version of the album.

Following the launch of the album in Korea, Kim focused his promotions in Japan, starting on August 3 at Zepp Tokyo. Entitled Kim Hyung Jun 2012 2nd Story in Japan, he toured the cities of Tokyo, Fukuoka, Osaka, Nagoya and Sapporo for the whole month of August. Kim also celebrated his 25th birthday during his Japan tour together with his family and friends, fans, and special guest Jichō Kachō's Komoto Junichi. He also appeared in various radio shows and selected Japanese television programs in between his tour to further promote his album.

== Track listing ==
Both the Korean and Taiwan version of the album include 5 original songs, with a bonus of "Sorry, I'm Sorry" music video and its making (and "Escape" teaser in Taiwan) on the DVD edition. On the other hand, the Japanese version of the album includes a Japanese version of "Sorry, I'm Sorry" and one new Japanese track "Callin'" besides the 5 original songs. The three CD+DVD jacket versions, however, replace the seventh track with songs "A Song Calling For You", "A Kata no Otoko" and "Sweet, Everyday" respectively, as well as including two music and drama videos each.

=== Korea and Taiwan edition ===
No.	Title	Lyrics	Music	Arrangement	Length
1.	"Intro (I'm)"	Lee Sag-i	Rado		01:24
2.	"Sorry I'm Sorry"	Rado	Rado	Rado	03:30
3.	"Just Let It Go"	Kim Tae-ju	Kim Tae-ju	Kim Tae-ju	03:18
4.	"잘못 걸었어 (Got It Wrong) - Ft. JQ"	Rado, Wontag, Ji In, Je I-kyu	Rado, Wontag, Ji In	Rado	03:18
5.	"나쁜 남자라서 (Bad Guy Thing)"	Rado, Wontag	Rado, Wontag	Rado	03:06

Korea CD+DVD edition: Bonus DVD
No.	Title	Length
1.	"Music video"
2.	"Making of music video"

Taiwan CD+DVD edition: Bonus DVD
No.	Title	Length
1.	"Music video"
2.	"Making of music video"
3.	"Escape teaser"

=== Japan edition ===
No.	Title	Lyrics	Music	Arrangement	Length
1.	"Intro (I'm)"	Lee Sag-i	RADO		01:24
2.	"Sorry I'm Sorry" (Korean Ver.)	RADO	RADO	RADO	03:30
3.	"Just Let It Go" (Korean Ver.)	Kim Tae-ju	Kim Tae-ju	Kim Tae-ju	03:18
4.	"悪い男だから (Bad Guy Thing)" (Korean Ver.)	RADO, Wontack	RADO, Wontack	RADO	03:06
5.	"間違い電話 (Got It Wrong) - Ft. JQ" (Korean Ver.)	Rado, Wontag, Ji In, Je I-kyu	RADO, Wontack, Ji In	RADO	03:18
6.	"Sorry I'm Sorry" (Japanese Ver.)		RADO	RADO	03:30
7.	"Callin' - Ft. JQ" (Japanese Ver.)		RADO, Wontack, Ji In	RADO	03:06

Japan CD+DVD Jacket A edition: Bonus
No.	Title	Lyrics	Music	Arrangement	Length
7.	"君を歌う歌 (A Song Calling For You)" (Korean Ver., Hyung-jun solo Ver.)	Han Sang-won, Im Young	Han Sang-won	Han Sang-won	03:41
8.	"Music video" (Dance Ver.)				04:20
9.	"Music video" (Drama Ver. 1)				05:42

Japan CD+DVD Jacket B edition: Bonus
No.	Title	Lyrics	Music	Arrangement	Length
7.	"A型の男 (A Kata no Otoko)" (Korean Ver.)	RADO, Ji In, Wontack, JQ	RADO, Ji In, Wontack	RADO	03:15
8.	"Music video" (Dance Ver.)				04:20
9.	"Music video" (Drama Ver. 2)				07:55

Japan CD+DVD Jacket C edition: Bonus
No.	Title	Music	Arrangement	Length
7.	"Sweet, Everyday" (Japanese ver.)	Han Sang-won	An Young-min	03:33
8.	"Music video" (Dance Ver.)			04:20
9.	"Music video" (Drama Ver. 3)			09:14

== Music videos ==
- "Sorry I'm Sorry"

== Release history ==
Country	Release date	Distributing label	Format
Worldwide	July 9, 2012	S-Plus Entertainment	Digital download
South Korea	July 10, 2012	Direct Media	CD+photobook
South Korea	July 13, 2012	Direct Media	CD+DVD
Japan	August 8, 2012	Swave E&t	CD+photobook
Japan	August 8, 2012	Swave E&t	CD+DVD (Jacket A, B, C)
Taiwan	August 17, 2012	Warner Music Taiwan	CD
Taiwan	August 17, 2012	Warner Music Taiwan	CD+DVD

== Charts ==
Chart	Country	Peak position	Notes
Gaon Weekly Album Chart	South Korea	5	
Gaon Monthly Album Chart	South Korea	21	7,477
Oricon Singles Chart	Japan	16	
G-Music Combo Chart	Taiwan	19	
G-Music J-Pop Chart	Taiwan	4	
