= 2020 in South Korean television =

This is a non-comprehensive list of Television in South Korea related events from 2020.

== Channels ==
Launches:

- March 16 -
  - ONCE
  - STATV
- May 6 - SPOTV Golf & Health
- June 16 - Pinkfong TV
- September 1 - Discovery Channel
- September 14 - OLIFE

== Ongoing ==
Title	Channel/Platform	First Aired	Source
The Haunted House	Tooniverse	July 20, 2016	

== New Series & Returning Shows ==
Title	Channel/Platform	First Aired	Finale	Status	Source
The Haunted House: Ghost Ball Double X Six Prophecies	Tooniverse	March 5	June 4	Ended	
The Haunted House: Ghost Ball Double X Suspicious Request	Tooniverse	October 8	January 21	Ended	

== Ending ==
End date	Title	Channel/Platform	First Aired	Source
June 4	The Haunted House: Ghost Ball Double X Six Prophcies	Tooniverse	March 5, 2020	
