= Memory (TV series) =

2016 South Korean television series

- Promotional poster
- Genre: Drama
- Written by: Kim Ji-woo
- Directed by: Park Chan-hong
- Starring: Lee Sung-min; Kim Ji-soo; Park Jin-hee
- Country of origin: South Korea
- Original language: Korean
- No. of episodes: 16

Production
- Production companies: MI Co., Ltd.

Original release
- Network: tvN
- Release: March 18 – May 7, 2016

Memory (Korean: 기억; Hanja: 記憶; RR: Gieok) is a South Korean television series starring Lee Sung-min, Kim Ji-soo and Park Jin-hee. It replaced Signal and aired on cable network tvN on Fridays and Saturdays at 20:30 (KST) from March 18, 2016 to May 7, 2016 for 16 episodes.

== Plot ==
The drama depicts a man's vigorous efforts to protect the precious value of the life and family love, as his memory starts fading away.

== Cast ==
=== Main cast ===
- Lee Sung-min as Park Tae-suk
- Kim Ji-soo as Seo Young-joo
- Park Jin-hee as Na Eun-sun

=== Supporting cast ===
- Ban Hyo-jung as Kim Soon-hee
- Jang Gwang as Park Chul-min
- Park Joon-geum as Jang Mi-rim
- Nam Da-reum as Park Jung-woo
- Kang Ji-woo as Park Yeon-woo
- Lee Jun-ho as Jung Jin
- Yoon So-hee as Bong Sun-hwa
- Jeon No-min as Lee Chan-moo
- Moon Sook as Hwang Tae-sun
- Song Sam-dong as Kim Je-hoon
- Song Seon-mi as Han Jung-won
- Lee Ki-woo as Shin Young-jin
- Heo Jung-do as Kang Yoo-bin
- Park Min-jung as Policewoman Choi
- Yeo Hoe-hyun as Lee Seung-ho
- Choi Deok-moon as Joo Jae-min
- Kim Min-sang as Joo Sang-pil
- Yoon Kyung-ho as Kim Chang-soo
- Lee Jung-gil as Shin Hwa-sik
- Park Joo-hyung as Cha Won-suk
- Seo In-sung as Park Dong-woo
- Jung Young-gi as Kwon Myung-soo
  - Ham Sung-min as Kwon Myung-soo (young)
- Song Ji-in as Yoon Sun-hee
- Jeon Jin-gi as Chairman Lee
- Choi Min-young as Kim Myung-soo
- Son Sung-chan as Kim Myung-soo's father
- Kim So-yeon as Kim Soo-ji
- Han Seo-jin as Kwon Mi-joo
- Lee Hee-jin as Do In-kyung
- Shin Jae-ha as Kang Hyun-wook
- Kan Mi-youn as Shin Young-jin's ex-lover
- Yoon Ji-on as Assistant director
- Song Ji-ho as Chun Min-gyoo
- Kang Shin-il as Kim Sun-ho (guest)

== Original soundtrack ==
Track listing
No.	Title	Artist	Length
1.	"If You Live Again" (다시 산다면)	Kim Feel	4:25
2.	"If You Live Again" (다시 산다면 (Inst.))	Kim Feel	4:25

== Ratings ==
In this table, the blue numbers represent the lowest ratings and the red numbers represent the highest ratings.

Ep.	Original broadcast date	Average audience share	
Ep.	Original broadcast date	AGB Nielsen	TNmS
Ep.	Original broadcast date	Nationwide	Nationwide
1	March 18, 2016	3.806%	3.2%
2	March 19, 2016	3.359%	3.2%
3	March 25, 2016	2.423%	3.6%
4	March 26, 2016	2.937%	2.4%
5	April 1, 2016	2.869%	2.6%
6	April 2, 2016	2.162%	1.7%
7	April 8, 2016	2.565%	2.7%
8	April 9, 2016	2.965%	1.9%
9	April 15, 2016	2.900%	2.4%
10	April 16, 2016	3.004%	2.7%
11	April 22, 2016	2.462%	2.2%
12	April 23, 2016	3.076%	1.9%
13	April 29, 2016	2.981%	2.4%
14	April 30, 2016	2.750%	1.7%
15	May 6, 2016	2.881%	2.4%
16	May 7, 2016	3.619%	2.4%
Average		2.922%	2.5%

- This drama airs on a cable channel/pay TV which normally has a relatively smaller audience compared to free-to-air TV/public broadcasters (KBS, SBS, MBC and EBS).

== Awards and nominations ==
Year	Award	Category	Recipient	Result
2016	9th Korea Drama Awards	Hot Star Award	Lee Ki-woo	Won
