= Sohn Kyung Shik =

South Korean businessperson (born 1939)

- 손경식
- Born: 1939 (age 86–87)
- Education: LLB; MBA
- Alma mater: Seoul National University; Oklahoma State University
- Occupation: Businessman
- Title: Chairman of CJ Group; Chairman of Korea Enterprises Federation

Korean name
- Hangul: 손경식
- Hanja: 孫京植
- RR: Son Gyeongsik
- MR: Son Kyŏngsik

Sohn Kyung Shik (Korean: 손경식) is a South Korean businessman who is the chairman of CJ Group and Korea Enterprises Federation.

== Biography ==
Sohn was born in 1939. He graduated from Kyunggi High School and Seoul National University School of Law before beginning his professional career at Hanil Bank in 1961. He then pursued further studies in the United States, attending Kentucky Wesleyan College and later earning an MBA from Oklahoma State University.

Upon returning to Korea in 1968, Sohn contributed to the founding of Samsung Electronics. In 1974, he became CEO of Samsung Fire & Marine Insurance.

In 1993, Sohn was appointed CEO of CheilJedang and laid the groundwork for what would become CJ Group.

== Career ==
As CJ Group chairman since 1993, Sohn oversaw the company's expansion into other sectors such as entertainment, logistics, and beauty.

Sohn served as Chairman of the Korea Chamber of Commerce and Industry for eight years, from 2005 to 2013, and assumed the chairmanship of the Korea Enterprises Federation (KEF) in 2018. Sohn served as KEF chairman a total of three times: 2018–2020, 2020–2022, and 2022–2024. KEF has become known for representing business leaders' perspectives on government economic policies.

Sohn has received honorary doctorates in Business Administration from Woosong University and Sejong University in Korea. He also contributes to Korea-U.S. relations as the Chaiman of the Korea-America Friendship Society.

The Korean government has awarded Sohn with the Gold Tower Order of Industrial Service Merit, the highest medal for industry leaders, and the Grand Order of Mugunghwa of the Order of Civil Merit, Korea's highest civilian honor. He received the Order of Do'stlik (Friendship) from Uzbekistan (2011), the Grand Cordon of the Order of the Rising Sun from Japan (2017), and the Van Fleet Award from The Korea Society (2018).
