= Hawwah (Gain EP) =

EP by Gain
- Released: March 12, 2015
- Recorded: 2014–2015
- Genre: Bossa nova; dance; electronic; jazz; drum n bass; R&B
- Length: 20:30
- Language: Korean
- Label: APOP Entertainment; LOEN Entertainment
- Producer: Yeong-cheol; Lee Min-soo; Kim Eana; Park Geun-tae; Park Soo-jong; Lee Jong-hoon; Jeong Seok-won; G.Gorilla; KZ; east4A; Jeon Da-woon; Michin Kamseong

Gain chronology
Truth or Dare (2014)	Hawwah (2015)

Singles from Hawwah
- 1. "Apple" Released: March 12, 2015; 2. "Paradise Lost" Released: March 12, 2015

Music video
- "Apple" on YouTube "Paradise Lost" on YouTube

Hawwah (stylized as ḥawwāh) is the fifth extended play by South Korean singer and actress Gain. It was released digitally on March 12, 2015, and physically five days later by APOP Entertainment (now a subsidiary of Mystic Entertainment), and distributed by LOEN Entertainment. Described as a Bible-influenced concept through the singer's understanding as a story, the extended play was executively produced by Jo Yeong-cheol and Lee Min-soo, with lyricist Kim Eana penning most of the record's lyrics. The extended play also saw Gain collaborating with several South Korean rappers, namely Jay Park and Dok2, while G.Gorilla, Mad Clown and singer Wheesung contributed lyrically to the release.

Upon its release, Hawwah received positive reviews from critics for its "fine" tune, further complimenting Gain for crossing the "extreme[ness]" in sexuality. The extended play was a commercial success for the singer in her native country, peaking at number five on the Gaon Album Chart, while experiencing her breaking into the United States, reaching number nine on the Billboard World Digital Albums chart. Two singles were released to promote the release, namely "Apple" and "Paradise Lost", to great commercial success.

== Background ==
After many reports of her home group's comeback in 2015, it was announced on February 26, 2015, that Gain would be releasing her fourth solo mini-album entitled Hawwah, which would be released in the middle of March. Through a modernized reinterpretation of Hawwah, the first woman created by God (Yahweh, the God of Israel), the album was expected to present unconventional music and concept.

The Bible-inspired album's release date was confirmed to be March 12, 2015. According to APOP Entertainment, Gain's agency, the EP would be promoted by two lead singles, and released digitally at 12:00 am KST on the aforementioned day.

== Composition ==
Hawwah was executive produced by Jo Young-cheol, while composer Lee Min-soo co-produced the album and lyricist Kim Eana participated as a lyric producer. Various male musicians collaborated with Gain for the album; Jay Park (featured artist and lyricist, "Apple"), Dok2 (featured artist and lyricist, "Free Will"), Mad Clown (lyricist, "Guilty") and Wheesung (lyricist, "Free Will"), while previous producers, such as KZ and east4A also participated in producing the songs. Due to her being an atheist, Gain understood the album's concept as a story, while expressing the album is "not easy to enjoy for a pop audience".

The album takes influences from mostly dance music and R&B, white interpolating elements from electronic, jazz and bossa nova. Featuring a lot of genres and moods, its content was described as a Biblical portrayal of Eve with emphasis on temptation, duality and self-confiding. Notably, the EP's release date coincides with Genesis 3:12, in which, after having eaten the "forbidden fruit", Adam blames Eve, for she had given him the fruit.

== Singles ==
=== "Apple" ===
"Apple" is one of two lead singles from Hawwah. It cutely expresses the desire about the "forbidden fruit". Featuring a rap by Jay Park, the song comes up with an answer to the worry about something to try in spite of knowing that it shouldn't be done. Based on jazz piano and melodies, the funky track shows an impressive combination of Gain's vocals and Jay Park's rapping. The song also contains a "Four, Tres, Two, Uno" sample from Fergie's "Fergalicious".

"Apple" reached number two on the Gaon Singles Chart for the 12th week of 2015. Since its release, the song has sold over 574,000 digital copies in South Korea.

A Billboard review of the song said that the accompanying music video "was also sweeter, but just as seductive as "Paradise Lost"."

=== "Paradise Lost" ===
"Paradise Lost", another lead track from the album, is inspired from the same-titled epic poem written by English poet John Milton. The song depicts Adam (the first man) and Hawwah expelled from the Garden of Eden after succumbing to the serpent's temptation.

The single reunited composer Lee Min-soo and lyricist Kim Eana, who have worked together with Gain since her first solo EP Step 2/4 (2010). It adds the steel guitar sound and strings on pipe organ instrumentation, which is rarely used in pop music. On March 9, 2015, in a premiere held prior to the album's release, Gain stated that she borrowed the character of the serpent attracting Hawwah in the song, to express the character of the woman.

The track's corresponding music video was filmed in Thailand. About her snakelike choreography in the music video, the singer commented, "Snakes caught my eyes as I studied about the concept of Hawwah. While snakes go slow they suddenly move quickly, and the sensation of their speed was attractive. I tried to capture that part."

"Paradise Lost" peaked at number six on the Gaon Singles Chart for the 13th week of 2015, and has sold nearly 363,000 digital copies domestically.

Fuse TV named the single's video clip as "one of the darkest K-pop music videos of 2015", saying that "Gain brings in a new perspective of K-pop to the world." Billboard magazine reviewed the song favorably, saying that "it opened with a nice balance of classical elements and modern embellishments." It also called the corresponding video a "must-see".

== Release and promotion ==
On February 28, the album's collaborative artists and track listing were revealed via the Web. A 25-second preview video for "Paradise Lost", one of two lead singles from the album, was released online at 3:12 pm on March 9. A preview video for another lead single "Apple" was released online the following day.

The entire album was released with an official music video for "Paradise Lost", and a corresponding music video for "Apple" came out a day after the EP's release.

Upon its release, Hawwah debuted and peaked at number five on the Gaon Weekly Albums Chart. The album also reached number nine on the Billboard World Albums Chart for the week of March 28, 2015, becoming Gain's first appearance on any U.S. chart.

Gain began promoting her comeback album on various music programs, starting on the March 12, 2015, broadcast of M! Countdown (Mnet). She promoted the lead singles on M! Countdown, Music Bank (KBS), Show! Music Core (MBC), Inkigayo (SBS), and The Show (SBS M).

Promotions for the album were concluded by the singer's performances on You Hee-yeol's Sketchbook (KBS), aired on April 24, 2015. On the show, Gain performed "Paradise Lost", along with her previous hit single "Bloom" (Korean: 피어나; RR: Pieona) and her home group's mega hit "Abracadabra".

== Track listing ==
CD/Digital download
No.	Title	Lyrics	Music	Length
1.	"Apple" (featuring Jay Park)	Kim Eana, Jay Park	Park Geun-tae, Park Soo-jong, Lee Jong-hoon	3:03
2.	"Free Will" (featuring Dok2)	Wheesung, Dok2	Jeong Seok-won, east4A	3:14
3.	"Paradise Lost"	Kim Eana	Lee Min-soo	3:30
4.	"The First Temptation"	Kim Eana	east4A, Lee Min-soo	3:36
5.	"Two Women" (두 여자; Du Yeoja)	G.Gorilla	G.Gorilla	4:01
6.	"Guilty"	Mad Clown	KZ, Jeon Da-woon, Michin Kamseong	3:06
Total length:				20:30

== Charts ==
Chart (2015)	Peak position	Sales
South Korean Gaon Album Chart	5	KOR: 4,300+
US Billboard World Albums Chart	9	KOR: 4,300+

== Release history ==
Region	Date	Format	Label
South Korea	March 12, 2015	Digital download	APOP Entertainment, LOEN Entertainment
Worldwide	March 12, 2015	Digital download	APOP Entertainment, LOEN Entertainment
South Korea	March 17, 2015	CD	APOP Entertainment, LOEN Entertainment
Taiwan	March 17, 2015	CD	Nega Network

== See also ==
- List of K-pop on the Billboard charts
