= 10cm (band) =

South Korean indie musical act

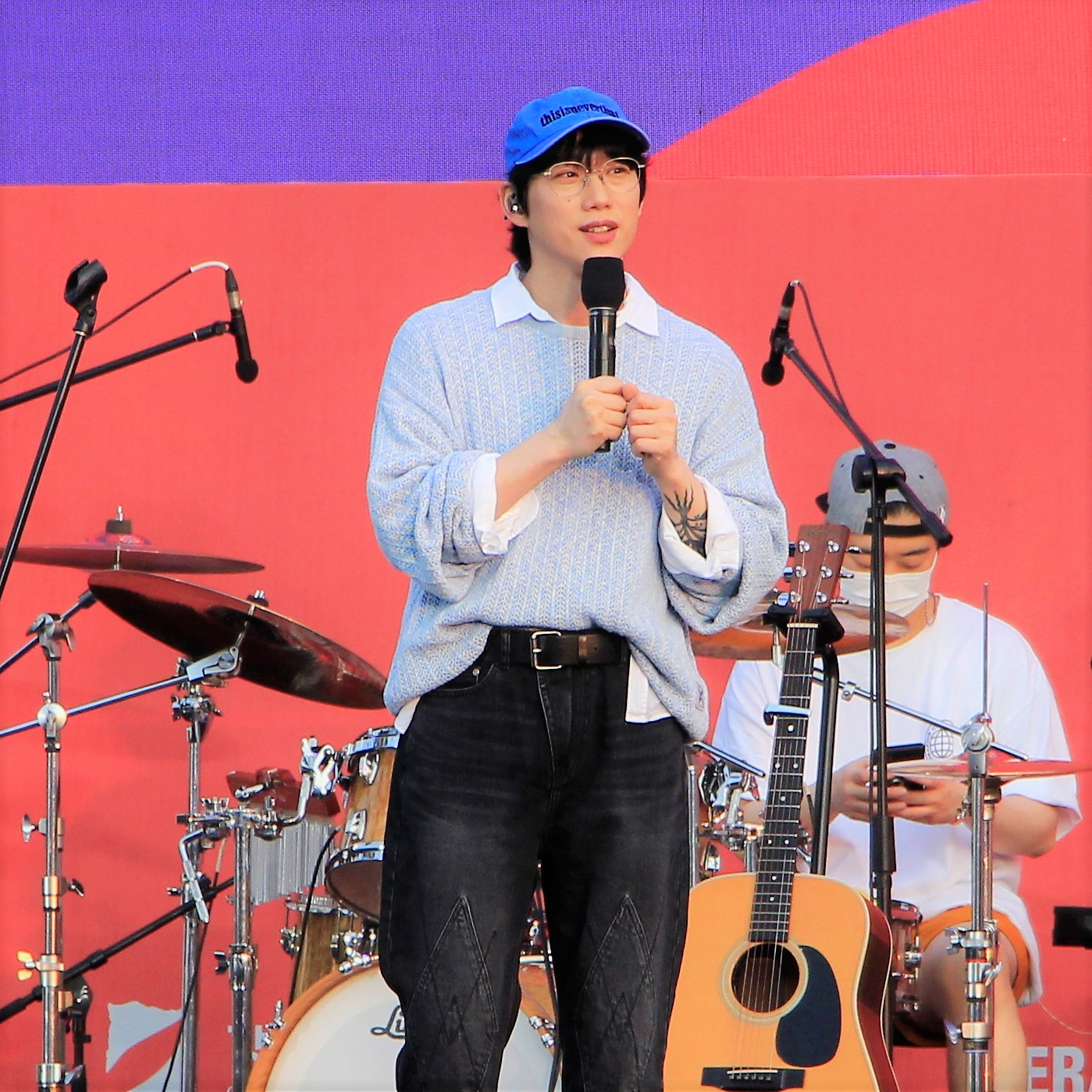
- 10cm in 2022

Background information
- Origin: South Korea
- Genre: Acoustic folk
- Years active: 2010–present
- Labels: Ten Music; Magic Strawberry Sound; Cam With Us
- Members: Kwon Jeong-yeol
- Past members: Yoon Cheol-jong
- Website: www.camwus.co.kr/10cm

10 cm (Korean: 십센치; RR: Sipsenchi) is a South Korean musical act currently composed of singer-songwriter Kwon Jeong-yeol.

Originally a duo composed of Kwon and Yoon Cheol-jong, 10 cm debuted in 2010. With the release of the single "Americano", the group quickly became one of the most popular indie acts in South Korea, winning the This Year's Discovery Award at the 2010 Mnet Asian Music Awards, followed by Best Pop Song at the 2011 Korean Music Awards. Their first full-length album, 1.0 (2011) sold 30,000 copies, a record for an indie act at the time. Following a slew of successful singles, and the release of the full-length albums 2.0 (2012) and 3.0 (2014), the group achieved its first number-one hit on the Gaon Digital Chart in 2016 with the single "What the Spring??".

Yoon left the group in July 2017 while facing charges for marijuana use. Kwon has continued to promote as a solo artist under the name 10 cm, releasing the album 4.0 in September 2017 and several singles, including the Gaon Digital Chart top-ten hits "Mattress" (2018), "However" (2019), and "Borrow Your Night" (2021). His concert Hotel room 1010 (2020) is the first paid online concert of a Korean non-idol artist.

== Career ==
=== Pre-debut ===
Kwon and Yoon were both from Gumi, North Gyeongsang. When Yoon was in his first year of high school, he was part of a school band club called 'Mad Pulse', and Kwon (who was in middle school at the time) brought a letter and a recorded tape of his work to Yoon to ask him if he could join the band. As Kwon gained some local fame with his singing skills, he was finally allowed to perform in Yoon's band. Because of this inclusion of Kwon to the team, Yoon (originally a vocalist) decided to take his position in the band as a guitarist to make room for Kwon. Kwon and Yoon formed the band 'Haeryeong (해령,海靈)' in Daegu in 2004. (Note: The band had a guitarist Yoo Ji-won as a leader but he later left.) After enlisting in the South Korean military, the two formed the band 'Seven Hills', named after the army unit they served in, called 'Chilbong'.

=== Birth of 10cm as a band ===
Around 2008 or 2009, the two arrived in Seoul to venture into the indie scene. The band debuted as an indie band at 'Club ta (打)', a famous live club located in Hongdae.

=== 2010–2011: Debut and 1.0 ===
Their debut EP, which was released in April 2010, was recorded with a microphone covered in stockings, and the album cover was 100% made by themselves. 3000 copies were published. The album sold out in one month, and the band gained popularity. In 2011, the band released their first studio album 1.0. The band described the music in the album as targeted towards office women in their late 20s to their 30s, and sought their empathy, which was a contrast to their early music, but gained popularity for their brutally honest and sensual lyrics. The first 10,000 copies were sold out on the release day. The band's early activities involved playing the djembe which was influenced from performances of Jason Mraz and Toca Rivera.

=== 2012–2017: 2.0 and 3.0 ===
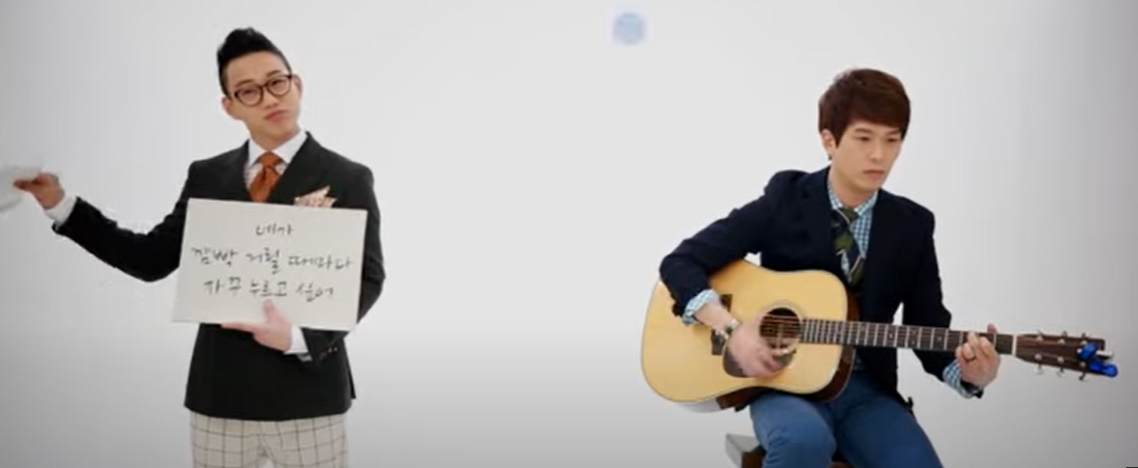
10cm in 2013. From left to right: Kwon Jung-yeol and Yoon Cheol-jong

The band released 2.0 in 2012. The band tried to create an adult-oriented sound that reminds them of the 1960s, that would resemble the vibe of Let It Be by the Beatles, which was widely contrasting to the band's refined production of their debut album. Also, while the production on 1.0 was minimalistic, the range of different instruments used on 2.0 increased, and different genres such as modern rock and tango were also explored. 3.0 was released in 2014, and the vocal parts for Cheol-jong increased compared to the previous albums.

=== 2017–present: Yoon's departure and future career ===
In June 2017, Yoon suddenly announced to departure from the group, which was later revealed to be a decision made by Yoon to not disturb his bandmate Kwon by Yoon's legal troubles related to him smoking Marijuana, which led to 10 cm becoming a one-man band. In September 2017, the release of 4.0 was announced.

On February 13, 2025, 10 cm signed an exclusive contract with Cam With Us.

== Philanthropy ==
On March 9, 2022, Kwon donated ₩20 million to the Hope Bridge Disaster Relief Association to help the victims of the massive wildfires that started in Uljin, Gyeongbuk, and also spread to Samcheok, Gangwon. On October 12, Kwon donated fees from the university festival performance to Yonsei University, his alma mater.

== Discography ==
=== Studio albums ===
Title	Album details	Peak chart positions	Sales
Title	Album details	KOR	Sales
1.0	Released: February 10, 2011; Label: Ten Music, Poclanos; Formats: CD, digital download	86	KOR: 30,000
2.0	Released: October 10, 2012; Label: Ten Music, Poclanos; Formats: CD, digital download	84	KOR: 2,247
3.0	Released: November 19, 2014; Label: Magic Strawberry Sound, Poclanos; Formats: CD, digital download	9	KOR: 3,785
4.0	Released: September 1, 2017; Label: Magic Strawberry Sound, Loen; Formats: CD, digital download	18	KOR: 2,083
5.0	Released: July 30, 2025; Label: Cam With Us, Kakao; Formats: CD, digital download	39	KOR: 7,390

=== Extended plays ===
Title	EP details	Peak chart positions	Sales
Title	EP details	KOR	Sales
The First EP	Released: April 22, 2010; Label: Ten Music, Poclanos; Formats: CD, LP, digital download	69	KOR: 1,245
The 2nd EP	Released: February 4, 2013; Label: Ten Music, Poclanos; Formats: CD, digital download	—	KOR: 2,975
The 3rd EP	Released: November 11, 2021; Label: Magic Strawberry Sound; Formats: CD, digital download	47	
"—" denotes a recording that did not chart.

=== Singles ===
==== As lead artist ====
Title	Year	Peak chart positions		Sales	Certifications	Album
Title	Year	KOR	US World	Sales	Certifications	Album
"Good Night"	2010	—	—			The First EP
"Americano" (아메리카노)	2010	12	—	KOR: 1,719,333		Non-album single
"Not That" (그게 아니고)	2011	54	—			1.0
"With the Heart to Forget You" (잊어야 한다는 마음으로)	2011	49	—	KOR: 376,644		Tribute to Kim Kwang Seok
"Hug Me" (안아줘요)	2011	3	—	KOR: 1,287,784		Non-album singles
"Motorcycle Guitar Ride" (기타로 오토바이를 타자)	2011	44	—	KOR: 335,595		Non-album singles
"Sorrow" (애상)	2012	3	—	KOR: 2,830,335		Non-album singles
"Fine Thank You and You?"	2012	3	—	KOR: 1,084,521		2.0
"Han River Farewell" (한강의 작별)	2012	22	—	KOR: 278,856		2.0
"Tonight" (오늘밤에)	2012	17	—	KOR: 337,459		2.0
"Love Is Blooming" (사랑이 방울지네타이틀)	2013	15	—	KOR: 546,484		Orange Revolution Festival Part 1
"Oh Yeah" (오예)	2013	17	—	KOR: 221,162		The 2nd EP
"Nothing Without You"	2013	25	—	KOR: 148,736		The 2nd EP
"Earthling?" (지구인?)	2013	29	—	KOR: 249,067		Non-album singles
"Hug Song" (안아줘요) (with Orange Caramel)	2013	14	—	KOR: 263,798		Non-album singles
"Sseudam Sseudam" (쓰담쓰담)	2014	12	—	KOR: 649,625		3.0
"Stalker" (스토커)	2014	43	—	KOR: 2,500,000		3.0
"Missing You" (그리워라)	2014	19	—	KOR: 194,257		3.0
"October Rain" (10월의 날씨)	2015	11	—	KOR: 189,129		3.1 (single)
"What the Spring??" (봄이 좋냐??)	2016	1	—	KOR: 1,327,551		3.2 (single)
"I Really Like You" (니가 참 좋아)	2016	18	—	KOR: 147,111		Non-album single
"That Five Minutes" (길어야 5분)	2016	16	—	KOR: 151,200		3.3 (single)
"Help"	2017	11	—	KOR: 162,569		4.0
"Phonecert" (폰서트)	2017	18	—	KOR: 2,500,000		4.0
"Bye Babe" (with Chen)	2017	28	24	KOR: 121,867		SM Station Season 2
"Mattress" (매트리스)	2018	4	—			4.1 (single)
"However" (그러나)	2019	5	—			4.3 (single)
"Do You Think of Me?" (방에 모기가 있어)	2019	31	—			4.4 (single)
"Tight"	2020	55	—			4.5 (single)
"Winter Breath" (입김)	2020	98	—			5.1 (single)
"Borrow Your Night" (이 밤을 빌려 말해요)	2021	2	—			Non-album single
"Sleepless in Seoul" (서울의 잠 못 이루는 밤) (feat. Lee Su-hyun (AKMU))	2021	37	—			5.2 (single)
"Go Back" (고백)	2021	38	—			2nd Confession 'Go Back' (single)
"Yesterday You Left Me" (어제 너는 나를 버렸어)	2021	35	—			The 3rd EP
"Gradation" (그라데이션)	2022	11	—		KMCA: Platinum (Note: Certification for streaming)	5.3 (single)
"Just 10 Centimetres" (딱 10CM만) (with Big Naughty)	2022	8	—			Non-album single
"They're Gonna Say We're Right (@leekangseung111)" (우리가 맞다는 대답을 할 거예요)	2023	89	—			Remake 1.0
"My Ultimate First Love" (부동의 첫사랑)	2023	33	—			5.4 (single)
"Dear" (소년)	2024	158	—			5.5 (single)
"Late Night Walk" (너랑 밤새고 싶어)	2024	185	—			5.6 (single)
"To Reach You" (너에게 닿기를)	2025	1	—		* KMCA: Platinum (Note: Certification for streaming)	Non-album single
"Follow Your Steps" (춤) (featuring Bibi)	2025	195	—			5.0
"—" denotes a recording that did not chart or was not released in that territory

==== As featured artist ====
Title	Year	Peak chart positions		Sales	Album
Title	Year	KOR	US World	Sales	Album
"Turned Off the TV" (TV를 껐네...) (Leessang feat. Yoon Mi-rae and Kwon Jung-yeol of 10cm)	2011	1	—	KOR: 3,081,880	Asura Balbalta
"Good Morning" (굿모닝) (Verbal Jint feat. Kwon Jung-yeol of 10cm)	2012	5	—	KOR: 1,798,590	10 Years of Misinterpretation 1
"Beautiful Girl" (Skull & Haha feat. Kwon Jung-yeol of 10cm)	2015	42	—	KOR: 70,190	Non-album single
"Deoksugung Stonewall Walkway" (덕수궁 돌담길의 봄) (Yoona feat. 10cm)	2016	24	7	KOR: 194,752; US: 2,000	A Walk to Remember
"Sudden Shower" (소나기) (Yong Jun-hyung feat. 10cm)	2018	5	—	—N/a	Non-album single
"Telephone" (척) (Exo-SC feat. 10cm)	2020	72	23	CHN: 221,490	1 Billion Views
"I'm Not Myself When I'm Around You" (이러면 안 될 거 아는데 너 앞에만 서면 나락) (DinDin feat. 10cm)	2021	108	—	—N/a	Non-album single
"Beyond Love" (정이라고 하자) (Big Naughty feat. 10cm)	2022	5	—	—N/a	Nangman
"Stranger" (입술) (Heize feat. 10cm)	2023	99	—	—N/a	Last Winter
"Love Dilemma" (사랑이 죄야?) (Kixo feat. 10cm and B.I)	2024	96	—	—N/a	Non-album single
"Cold" (Young Posse feat. 10cm)	2025	— (Note: "Cold" did not enter the Circle Digital Chart, but it peaked at number 81 on the component Download Chart.)	—	—N/a	Cold
"Just 1 Year" (딱 1년만) (Big Naughty feat. 10cm)	2025	107	—	—N/a	Non-album single
"—" denotes a recording that did not chart or was not released in that territory

=== Soundtrack appearances ===
Title	Year	Peak chart positions	Sales (DL)	Album
Title	Year	KOR	Sales (DL)	Album
"Only U"	2012	20	KOR: 398,709	I Need Romance 2012 OST
"One Day" (어느 날)	2012	39	KOR: 179,195	Golden Time OST
"Maybe" (아마도)	2013	43	KOR: 201,976	The Queen of Office OST
"If You Can Come" (와준다면)	2016	—	KOR: 19,555	Woman with a Suitcase OST
"My Eyes" (내 눈에만 보여)	2016	7	KOR: 690,394	Guardian: The Lonely and Great God OST
"Perfect"	2018	36		Love Playlist 3 OST
"Lean on My Shoulders" (나의 어깨에 기대어요)	2019	13		Hotel del Luna OST
"But It's Destiny" (우연인 듯 운명)	2019	108		Crash Landing on You OST
"Where Is Dream"	2020	161		Start-Up OST
"Drawer" (서랍)	2021	23		Our Beloved Summer OST
"For Love" (봄 to 러브)	2022	83		Our Blues OST
"The way to lose you"	2024	—		My Demon OST
"Tell Me It's Not a Dream" (고장난걸까)	2024	100		Queen of Tears OST
"Tell Me It's Not a Dream" (Eng ver.)	2024	—		Queen of Tears OST
"Tiramisu Cake" (티라미수 케익)	2024	162		The Last 10 Years OST
"Spring Snow" (봄눈)	2024	31		Lovely Runner OST
"Hush of Sunset" (노을)	2025			Our Unwritten Seoul OST
"—" denotes a recording that did not chart.

=== Other charted songs ===
Title	Year	Peak chart positions	Sales (DL)	Album
Title	Year	KOR	Sales (DL)	Album
"Love in the Milky Way Cafe" (사랑은 은하수 다방에서)	2011	15	KOR: 1,906,628	1.0
"So Nice" (죽겠네)	2011	53	KOR: 142,376	1.0
"You and I" (그대와 나)	2012	28	KOR: 244,912	2.0
"Smelly Girl" (냄새나는 여자)	2012	36	KOR: 228,298	2.0
"Your Flower" (너의 꽃)	2012	43	KOR: 187,731	2.0
"So..." (그러니까...)	2012	45	KOR: 175,442	2.0
"Red Dragonfly" (고추잠자리)	2012	49	KOR: 169,995	2.0
"Now.Here's.Enough" (이제.여기서.그만)	2012	51	KOR: 168,019	2.0
"Heart" (마음)	2012	55	KOR: 132,998	2.0
"Corona"	2012	56	KOR: 90,030	2.0
"Tonight" (오늘밤에) (Clean ver.)	2012	92	KOR: 56,786	2.0
"Morning Call" (모닝콜)	2013	39	KOR: 95,097	The 2nd EP
"But I'm Sleepy" (근데 나 졸려)	2013	44	KOR: 87,744	The 2nd EP
"Don't Let Me Go"	2013	55	KOR: 66,829	The 2nd EP
"Crush" (짝사랑)	2014	75	KOR: 32,892	3.0
"African Youth" (아프리카 청춘이다)	2014	81	KOR: 30,191	3.0
"What Makes Women Angry" (여자는 왜 화를 내는 걸까)	2014	86	KOR: 29,606	3.0
"3rd Album Burdens" (3집에 대한 부담감)	2014	98	KOR: 25,032	3.0
"Inseparable" (뗄래야 뗄 수 없는 사이)	2014	99	KOR: 26,290	3.0
"Secret Love" (비밀연애)	2015	45	KOR: 54,116	3.1 (single)
"Pet"	2017	92	KOR: 40,910	4.0
"Storage" (with Galaxy Fan)	2019	193		4.3 (single)

== Filmography ==
=== Television ===
Title	Year	Role	Notes	Ref.
The Seasons: 10cm's Pat-Pat	2025	Host	Music talk show	
Veiled Cup	2026	Judge		

== Accolades ==
=== Awards and nominations ===
Name of the award ceremony, year presented, category, nominee(s) of the award, and the result of the nomination
Award	Year	Category	Nominee(s)	Result	Ref.
Brand Customer Loyalty Awards	2020	Indie/Folk Artist	10 cm	Won	
Cyworld Digital Music Awards	2010	Tam Eum Mania Award (August)	"Americano"	Won	
Cyworld Digital Music Awards	2011	Tam Eum Mania Award (February)	"Love in the Milky Way Cafe"	Won	
KBS Entertainment Awards	2025	Rookie Award (Show/Variety)	The Seasons: 10cm's Pat-Pat	Won	
Korean Music Awards	2011	Best Pop Song	"Tonight I'm Afraid of the Dark"	Won	
Korean Music Awards	2011	Rookie of the Year	10 cm	Nominated	
Korean Music Awards	2012	Artist of the Year	10 cm	Nominated	
Korean Music Awards	2012	Best Pop Album	1.0	Nominated	
Korean Music Awards	2012	Best Pop Song	"Not That"	Nominated	
Melon Music Awards	2015	Best Folk/Blues	"Sseudam Sseudam"	Won	
Melon Music Awards	2016	Best Folk/Blues	"What the Spring??"	Won	
Melon Music Awards	2017	Best Folk/Blues	"Phonecert"	Nominated	
Melon Music Awards	2018	Best Indie	"Mattress"	Nominated	
Melon Music Awards	2021	Best Male Solo Artist	10 cm	Nominated	
Melon Music Awards	2022	Best Collaboration	"Beyond Love" (with Big Naughty)	Won	
Melon Music Awards	2022	Best Male Solo Artist	10 cm	Nominated	
Melon Music Awards	2024	Best Original Soundtrack	"Spring Snow"	Nominated	
Mnet Asian Music Awards	2010	This Year's Discovery Award	10 cm	Won	
Mnet Asian Music Awards	2012	Best Band Performance	"Fine Thank You and You?"	Nominated	
Mnet Asian Music Awards	2016	Best Band Performance	"What The Spring??"	Nominated	
Mnet Asian Music Awards	2021	Best Band Performance	"Sleepless in Seoul" (feat. Lee Su-hyun)	Nominated	
Mnet Asian Music Awards	2021	Best Original Soundtrack	"Borrow Your Night"	Nominated	
Mnet Asian Music Awards	2022	Best Original Soundtrack	"Drawer"	Nominated	
Mnet Asian Music Awards	2022	Best Collaboration	"Just 10 Centimeters" (with Big Naughty)	Nominated	

=== State honors ===
Name of country, year given, and name of honor
Country	Organization	Year	Honor or Award	Ref.
South Korea	Korean Popular Culture and Arts Awards (Note: Honors are given at the Korean Popular Culture and Arts Awards, arranged by the Korea Creative Content Agency and hosted by the Ministry of Culture, Sports and Tourism. They are awarded to those who have contributed to the arts and South Korea's pop culture.)	2023	Prime Minister's Commendation	

== Concerts ==
- 2013.02.23 "Fine thank you and you?", the Olympic Gymnastics Stadium, Korea.
- 2014.01.31 '부루다콘서트 VER1. "Hello 10cm", LA, the United States.
- 2020.10.10 "Hotel room 1010", kakaoTV, Korea.

=== 2024 Asia Tour 10CM Closer to You ===
Concert dates
Date	City	Country	Venue	Revenue	Ref
July 14, 2024	Singapore		Gateway Theatre	-	
July 15, 2024	Singapore		Gateway Theatre	-	
July 21, 2024	Kuala Lumpur	Malaysia	EX-8	-	
July 27, 2024	Bangkok	Thailand	Lido Connect Hall 2	-	
August 10, 2024	Tokyo	Japan	Zepp Haneda	-	
August 31, 2024	Manila	Philippines	Newport Performing Arts Theater	-	
September 6, 2024	Taipei	Taiwan	Zepp New Taipei	-	
September 15, 2024	Macau	China	Broadway Theatre	-	
November 8, 2024	Hong Kong	China	MacPherson Stadium	-	
November 30, 2024	Jakarta	Indonesia	Balai Sarbini	-	
Total				N/A	

=== 2026 Asia Tour To 10CM: Chapter ===
Concert dates
Date	City	Country	Venue	Revenue	Ref
January 30, 2026	Seoul	South Korea	Blue Square SOL Travel Hall	-	
January 31, 2026	Seoul	South Korea	Blue Square SOL Travel Hall	-	
February 1, 2026	Seoul	South Korea	Blue Square SOL Travel Hall	-	
February 5, 2026	Seoul	South Korea	Blue Square SOL Travel Hall	-	
February 6, 2026	Seoul	South Korea	Blue Square SOL Travel Hall	-	
February 7, 2026	Seoul	South Korea	Blue Square SOL Travel Hall	-	
February 8, 2026	Seoul	South Korea	Blue Square SOL Travel Hall	-	
February 14, 2026	Busan	South Korea	Bexco Auditorium	-	
February 15, 2026	Busan	South Korea	Bexco Auditorium	-	
March 7, 2026	Bangkok	Thailand	Phenix Grand Ballroom	-	
March 14, 2026	Singapore		The Theatre at Mediacorp	-	
March 20, 2026	Taipei	Taiwan	Zepp New Taipei	-	
March 28, 2026	Tokyo	Japan	Zepp DiverCity	-	
April 26, 2026	Hong Kong	China	MacPherson Stadium	-	
May 2, 2026	Daejeon	South Korea	Chungnam National University Jeongsimhwa Hall	-	
May 3, 2026	Daejeon	South Korea	Chungnam National University Jeongsimhwa Hall	-	
Total				N/A	
