= The Huntresses =

- Hangul: 조선미녀 삼총사
- Hanja: 朝鮮美女 三銃士
- RR: Joseonminyeo samchongsa
- MR: Chosŏnminyŏ samch'ongsa
- Directed by: Park Jae-hyun
- Written by: Kim Ga-young; Kang Chul-kyu; Kim Ba-da
- Produced by: Kang Chul-kyu
- Starring: Ha Ji-won; Kang Ye-won; Son Ga-in; Ko Chang-seok; Joo Sang-wook
- Cinematography: Yoon Hong-sik
- Edited by: Steve M. Choe
- Music by: Hwang Sang-jun
- Distributed by: Showbox/Mediaplex
- Release date: January 29, 2014
- Running time: 107 minutes
- Country: South Korea
- Language: Korean
- Box office: US$2,707,851

The Huntresses (Korean: 조선미녀 삼총사; RR: Joseonminyeo samchongsa; lit. 'Joseon Beautiful Lady Three Musketeers') is a 2014 South Korean period action comedy film directed by Park Jae-hyun. starring Ha Ji-won, Kang Ye-won and Son Ga-in as the three most legendary bounty hunters in the Joseon.

== Plot ==
The intelligent and talented martial arts swordswoman Jin-ok (Ha Ji-won), housewife and fighter Hong-dan (Kang Ye-won), and Ga-bi (Son Ga-in), the youngest of the trio: These three women are Joseon's top bounty hunters, and they never fail to capture a target, no matter the criminal or the crime. They set out on a secret mission commissioned by the king to search for the stauroscope, and in doing so, prevent a powerful group from gaining absolute power and overturning the royal family.

== Cast ==
- Ha Ji-won as Jin-ok:
  Fearless leader of the group with unstoppable drive and charisma. She also invents unique weapons with the ability to disguise herself.
- Kang Ye-won as Hong-dan:
  A married woman ("ajumma") who is better at throwing daggers than cooking and better in tumbling than housework. She's swift with a sword and thinks money is the best thing on earth.
- Gain as Ga-bi:
  The youngest of the group, she's a fist first and ask questions later kind of person.
- Ko Chang-seok as Mu-myeong:
  A monk (Mu-myeong literally means "no name").
- Joo Sang-wook as Sa-hyeon:
  A warrior who threatens the three women.
- Choi Seong-min as Kim Ja-heon
- Park Dong-bin as One-eyed 1
- Ha Yong-jin as One-eyed 2
- Yoon Hee-won as Police chief
- Hwang Taek-ha as Eop-dong
- Han Yeong-soo as Chil-bok
- Lee Yoo-joon as Gan-nan
- Kang Min-ho as Maeng-ga
- Lee Jang-hoon as Mo Seok-doo
- Park Il-mok as Gong-goo
- Seo Gwang-jae as Gong-chil
- Han Kook-jin as Maeng-ga's colleague
- Lee Hee-seok as Hong-dan's husband
- Jin Ji-hee as young Jin-ok
- Chae Sang-woo as young Sa-hyeon
- Shin Yi-joon as young Ga-bi
- Kang Min-ah as young Hong-dan
- Jung Ho-bin as Jo Yoo-sik (cameo)
- Gong Jung-hwan as Monarch (cameo)
- Song Sae-byeok as Raiding constable Song (cameo)
- Wang Hee-ji as Pa Heul-nae (cameo)
- Jang Hee-soo as Hong-dan's mother-in-law (cameo)
