= Gain (singer) =

South Korean singer

Son Ga-in
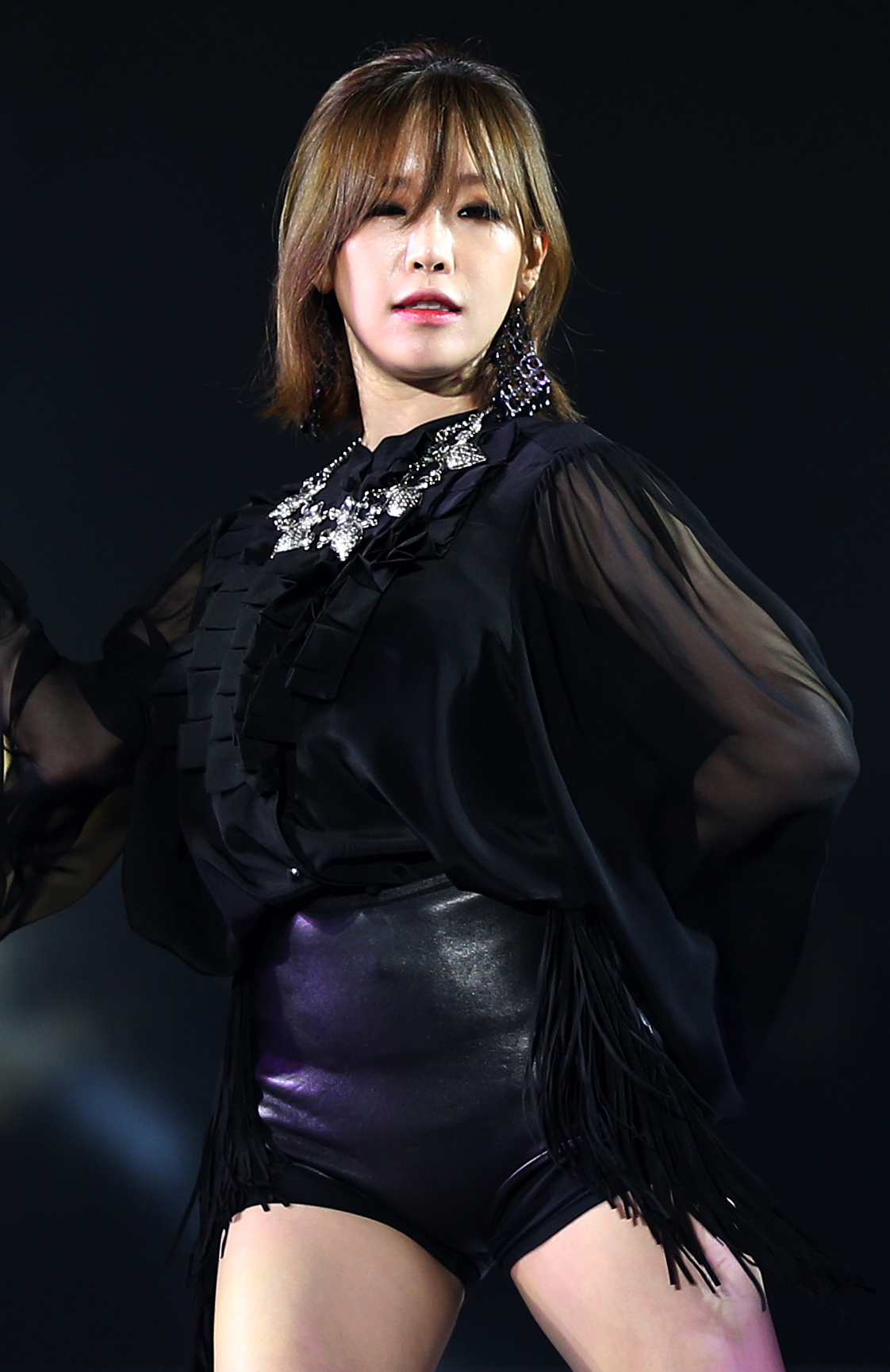
- Gain in 2013

Background information
- Also known as: Baby-G
- Born: September 20, 1987 (age 39); Seoul, South Korea
- Genres: K-pop; R&B; dance-pop; jazz
- Occupations: Singer; actress; entertainer
- Years active: 2006–2021; 2025–present
- Label: Apop
- Member of: Brown Eyed Girls

Korean name
- Hangul: 손가인
- Hanja: 孫佳人
- RR: Son Gain
- MR: Son Kain

Son Ga-in (손가인; born September 20, 1987), known mononymously as Gain, is a South Korean singer, actress and entertainer, best known as a member of the South Korean girl group Brown Eyed Girls. Having debuted with her home group earlier in 2006, Gain eventually made her solo debut in October 2010 with Step 2/4 to great commercial success, and has since released a total of six extended plays. In addition to her musical career, the singer also appeared in several native programs and series, most notably We Got Married and All My Love for You, where she co-starred alongside 2AM's Jo Kwon.

== Career ==
=== 2005–2009: Brown Eyed Girls and solo projects ===
Son Ga-In was noticed by the existing members of Brown Eyed Girls after she was eliminated during auditions for the popular South Korean reality series, Let's Coke Play! Battle Shinhwa! She was approached by composer Ahn Jung-hoon and invited to audition at Brown Eyed Girls' company, Nega Network, eventually joining the group. The four members performed several small shows before officially debuting as Brown Eyed Girls in 2006. In the same year, she performed a duet "Must Have Love" with SG Wannabe's leader Kim Yong-jun, which became her first number one hit during the Christmas season.

Despite having initial successes, it was not until 2009 that her home group made a breakthrough into Korean mainstream with their hit song "Abracadabra", which was notable for the group's shift of their image and their new direction. After the unexpected success of the song, the group gained further recognition.

Beside her involvement with the group, she also appeared in 4Tomorrow, a collaboration project with 4Minute's Hyuna, After School's Uee and KARA's Han Seung-yeon. She also released a digital single, titled "I Happen to Love You" (우리 사랑하게 됐어요) with then We Got Married partner Jo Kwon of 2AM, composed by fellow member JeA, written by Kim Eana, and produced by Lee Min-soo. The duet became a successand spent three weeks at the top of the Gaon Digital Chart of 2010.

=== 2010: Solo career debut and Step 2/4 ===
In April 2010, it was announced that all the Brown Eyed Girls' members would pursue their own solo careers beside the group's activities. Gain became the second member to start her solo activities after Narsha by releasing her first mini-album, Step 2/4, with "Irreversible" as the title track in October 2010, to critical acclaim from critics and public due to its strong influence of tango. The video for the track was then released on October 8, 2010, alongside the album's release. The mini-album also achieved modest success, peaking at number two on Gaon Weekly Albums Chart while the title track became her first solo number one hit. Gain worked with university professor Park Myung-soo (Seoul Arts University) on the tango-inspired choreography for "Irreversible". On December 21, 2010, "Bad Temper" was released as a digital download single. She then resumed her group activities after the end of the album's promotion.

After the promotions of Brown Eyed Girls' fourth album, it was revealed that Gain had signed a contract with LOEN Entertainment to manage her solo career.

=== 2012–2013: Talk About S, Romantic Spring and "Gentleman" ===
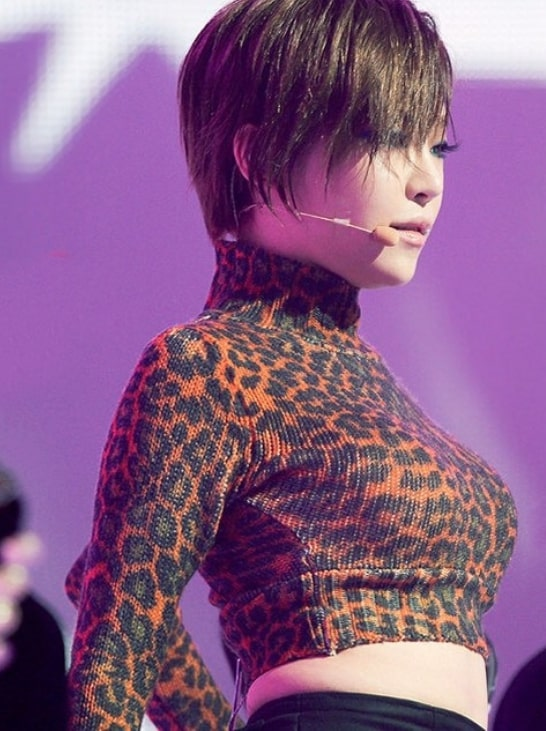
Gain in 2012

Prior to the release of her second EP, Gain was featured on Yoon Il-sang's anniversary album Yoon Il-sang 21st Anniversary Album: I'm 21 with a cover of "For You Not To Know" (너만은 모르길). She also released a duet with JYP in April 2012, titled "Someone Else", to certain success, peaking at number two on Gaon Weekly Singles Chart.

However it was only after the release of Brown Eyed Girls' digital single "The Original" that her sophomore EP, Talk About S, would be released on October 5, 2012, followed by teasers of the album's content. Reunited with long-time collaborators of both her home group and her previous debut album, such as lyricist Kim Eana, producer Lee Min-soo and Jo Yeong-cheol, the album was received with positive reacts from both critics and the public, while becoming her first release to take the top spot of Gaon Weekly Albums Chart, also her best selling release to date. Its title track, "Bloom", was also her best selling track and one of her signature hits. On November 30, 2012, "Nostalgia" was released digitally as a single, featuring rapper Eric Mun of boyband Shinhwa.

Later on April 8, 2013, Romantic Spring was released as a collaboration project between Gain and Korean singer Cho Hyung-woo, who later became her labelmate. The collaborative EP debuted at number three on Gaon Albums Chart. On April 13, 2013, she was featured in PSY's music video "Gentleman", along with the "arrogant" dance which was popularized in the Brown Eyed Girls song "Abracadabra". She then returned with Brown Eyed Girls' 5th studio album, Black Box, which was released on July 25, 2013, and later appeared as a guest performer for IU's "Everybody Has Secrets" (누구나 비밀은 있다) on her 2013 release. In the same year Gain parted with LOEN Entertainment and joined the APOP Entertainment roster, while making her first major appearance in film with The Huntresses.

=== 2014: Truth or Dare ===
At the beginning of 2014, Gain released her third mini-album, titled Truth or Dare, which featured lyrics from Kim Eana, Lee Hyo-ri and JYP, along with guest performers such as Bumkey and Jo Kwon, with the former being featured in the album's first single. Considered as a "bolder" move for herself, the album was preceded by "Fxxk U", which received mixed reactions from the public due to its theme dealing with domestic violence; however, it was praised by critics. The second single "Truth or Dare" (진실 혹은 대담) was released on February 6, 2014, to modest success, while the third single "A Tempo" was released digitally on March 21, 2014. Later that year, Gain was featured in Pitchfork's "20 Essential K-Pop Songs" list with "Fxxk U" and "Tinkerbell", the latter an opening track for her second mini-album. She also appeared as KARA's Goo Hara's friend in her own reality show Hara ON & OFF at the end of 2014.

=== 2015–2019: Hawwah, Brown Eyed Girls' 10th anniversary and End Again ===
It was announced that Gain would go on to release her fourth solo mini-album (fifth overall), titled Hawwah in February 2015 as a follow-up to her previous Truth or Dare EP. The album marked the first time in her solo career to feature two title tracks, followed by a Bible-influenced concept. Released in March 2015, the EP eventually debuted and peaked at number five on Gaon Weekly Albums Chart while appearing at number nine on Billboard World Albums Chart, thus becoming her fourth top five entry and her first to chart in the US. Its singles, "Apple" and "Paradise Lost", peaked at number two and number six on Gaon Weekly Singles Chart respectively. As of April 2015, the album has sold 4,203 copies. She was later announced as one of the participants for JTBC's Going to School, a reality television show about idols going back to high school.

During an interview with Billboard, Gain announced that her home group would return with a new album to coincide with their tenth anniversary since debuting in 2006 and the possibilities of another solo release in 2015 also. Gain released the first part of her first full album, End Again, on September 8, 2016. The title track was "Carnival (The Last Day)". As of 2024, the second part of her first full album, Begin Again, has not been released. In September 2019, she participated in Brown Eyed Girls' cover album, RE_vive.

=== 2025-present: Return to industry ===
On December 17, 2025, Gain and 2AM's Jo Kwon released a remade version of their duet track "I Happen to Love You".

== Filmography and television work ==
Gain appeared on We Got Married with 2AM's Jo Kwon starting from September 2009. Their virtual marriage came to an end after 15 months in January 2011. She made her acting debut in MBC daily sitcom All My Love for You. She was the female lead Hwang Geum-ji, alongside Jo Kwon, who played the role as her younger twin brother Hwang Ok-yeop. Her character was the love interest of Yoon Doo-joon (from BEAST) character also named "Yoon Doo-joon". However, owing to schedule conflicts, her participation in the sitcom ended in May 2011. In 2013, she became one of the three main female characters for The Huntresses, along with Ha Ji-won and Kang Ye-won. She also participated in JTBC's Going to School in 2015, along with other idols such as Taemin of Shinee and Seulgi of Red Velvet.

== Legal issues ==
In July 2021, Gain apologized for illegally using propofol, an anesthetic drug prohibited from being used for purposes other than surgical treatments in South Korea. She was fined ₩1 million (US$883 in 2021) after being indicted for using propofol in an unspecified city in the Gyeonggi Province between July and August 2019. In an apology issued by Mystic Story, the parent company of Apop, it was stated that Gain "made a reckless choice due to severe depression and a sleep disorder." Following the incident, Gain was inactive in the entertainment industry from 2021 until making a return in 2025.

== Discography ==
Gain discography
- Extended plays: 5
- Singles: 13
- Collaborative singles: 8

=== Extended plays ===
List of extended plays, with selected chart positions and sales figures
| Title | Album details | Peak chart positions | | Sales |
| Title | Album details | KOR | US World | Sales |
|---|---|---|---|---|
| Step 2/4 | Released: October 8, 2010; Label: Nega Network, LOEN Entertainment; Format: CD+DVD, Digital download | 2 | — | KOR: 9,700+ (Note: Sales figures for Step 2/4 as of October 2010.) |
| Talk About S | Released: October 5, 2012; Label: LOEN Entertainment; Format: CD, digital download | 2 | — | KOR: 10,000+ (Note: Sales figures for Talk About S as of October 2012.) |
| Romantic Spring (with Jo Hyeong-u) | Released: April 8, 2013; Label: LOEN Entertainment; Format: CD, digital download | 3 | — | KOR: 5,100+ (Note: Sales figures for Romantic Spring as of April 2013.) |
| Truth or Dare | Released: February 6, 2014; Label: APOP Entertainment, LOEN Entertainment; Format: CD, digital download | 6 | — | KOR: 6,500+ (Note: Sales figures for Truth or Dare until the first half of 2014.) |
| Hawwah | Released: March 12, 2015; Label: APOP Entertainment, LOEN Entertainment; Format: CD, digital download | 5 | 9 | KOR: 4,300+ |
| End Again | Released: September 8, 2016; Label: APOP Entertainment, LOEN Entertainment; Format: CD, digital download | 5 | — | KOR: 2,747 |
"—" denotes releases that did not chart.

=== Singles ===
==== As a lead artist ====
List of singles as a lead artist, with selected chart positions and sales figures
| Title | Year | Peak chart positions | | Sales | Album |
| Title | Year | KOR Gaon | KOR Hot | Sales | Album |
|---|---|---|---|---|---|
| "Must Have Love" (with Kim Yong-jun of SG Wannabe) | 2006 | * | * | | Must Have Love (Digital single) |
| "Must Have Friends" (with Kim Yong-jun of SG Wannabe) | 2006 | * | * | | Must Have Love (Digital single) |
| "Tomorrow" (with Hyuna, Uee and Han Seung-yeon as 4Tomorrow) | 2009 | * | * | | Non-album singles |
| "I Happen to Love You" (with Jo Kwon of 2AM) | 2009 | 1 | * | KOR: 2,085,894 | Non-album singles |
| "Irreversible" (돌이킬 수 없는) | 2010 | 1 | * | KOR: 1,643,151 | Step 2/4 |
| "Bad Temper" | 2010 | 11 | * | | Non-album single |
| "Wish You Wouldn't Know" (너만은 모르길) (As One cover) | 2012 | 8 | 9 | KOR: 858,167 | Yoon Il-sang 21st Anniversary Album: I'm 21 |
| "Bloom" (피어나) | 2012 | 2 | 2 | KOR: 1,802,996 | Talk About S |
| "Nostalgia" (노스텔지아) (featuring Eric Mun of Shinhwa) | 2012 | 13 | 14 | KOR: 446,963 | Non-album single |
| "Brunch" (with Cho Hyung-woo) | 2013 | 19 | 36 | KOR: 235,930 | Romantic Spring |
| "Fxxk U" (featuring Bumkey) | 2014 | 3 | 2 | KOR: 651,438 | Truth or Dare |
| "Truth or Dare" (진실 혹은 대담) | 2014 | 8 | 7 | KOR: 399,113 | Truth or Dare |
| "A Tempo" | 2014 | 22 | 29 | KOR: 118,834 | Non-album single |
| "Apple" (featuring Jay Park) | 2015 | 2 | * | KOR: 625,263 | Hawwah |
| "Paradise Lost" | 2015 | 6 | * | KOR: 366,047 | Hawwah |
| "When The Twelve O'Clock" (열두 시가 되면) | 2015 | 24 | * | KOR: 197,696 | When The Twelve O'Clock (Digital single) |
| "Carnival (The Last Day)" | 2016 | 40 | * | KOR: 131,861 | End Again |
| "Pray" (with Jeff Bernat) | 2017 | 82 | * | KOR: 20,119 | Non-album single |
| "I Happen to Love You" (2025) (with Jo Kwon) | 2025 | 162 | * | | Even If This Love Disappears Tonight OST |
"—" denotes releases that did not chart.

==== As a featured artist ====
List of singles as a featured artist, with selected chart positions and sales figures
| Title | Year | Peak chart positions | | Sales | Album |
| Title | Year | KOR Gaon | KOR Hot | Sales | Album |
|---|---|---|---|---|---|
| "Marriage" (결혼) (Choi Jung-chul featuring Gain) | 2008 | * | * | | Marriage |
| "Someone Else" (Park Jin-Young featuring Gain) | 2012 | 2 | 4 | KOR: 1,201,982 | Spring: 5 Songs for 1 New Love |
| "Take Out" (Ra.D featuring Gain) | 2012 | 21 | 15 | KOR: 470,620 | LOEN Tree: Summer Story |
| "MaMa Beat" (LC9 featuring Gain) | 2013 | 86 | — | KOR: 22,236 | Skirmish |
| "Seoul Lonely" (Phantom featuring Gain) | 2014 | 23 | 53 | KOR: 269,024 | Phantom Power |
| "Queen" (Miryo featuring Gain) | 2015 | 98 | * | KOR: 23,635 | Non-album single |
"—" denotes releases that did not chart

=== Other charted songs ===
List of songs, with selected chart positions
| Title | Year | Peak chart positions | | Album |
| Title | Year | KOR Gaon | KOR Hot | Album |
|---|---|---|---|---|
| "Nitchell (Baby-G Mix)" | 2010 | 132 | * | Step 2/4 |
| "Tango the Night" | 2010 | 90 | * | Step 2/4 |
| "Esperando" | 2010 | 117 | * | Step 2/4 |
| "The One Who Sings" | 2010 | 78 | * | Step 2/4 |
| "Truth" | 2010 | 56 | * | Step 2/4 |
| "Tinkerbell" | 2012 | 30 | 22 | Talk About S |
| "Tiredness" | 2012 | 33 | 24 | Talk About S |
| "The Gaze" (featuring Yoon Jong-shin) | 2012 | 65 | 56 | Talk About S |
| "Catch Me If You Can" | 2012 | 89 | 80 | Talk About S |
| "2 O'Clock Date" | 2013 | 118 | — | Romantic Spring |
| "Sway" | 2013 | 158 | — | Romantic Spring |
| "Let Me In" | 2013 | 171 | — | Romantic Spring |
| "Everybody Has Secrets" (IU featuring Gain) | 2013 | 2 | 3 | Modern Times |
| "Q&A" (featuring Jo Kwon of 2AM) | 2014 | 33 | 27 | Truth or Dare |
| "Black & White" | 2014 | 51 | 40 | Truth or Dare |
| "Disclosure" | 2014 | 77 | 64 | Truth or Dare |
| "I Believe" | 2014 | 65 | * | My Spring Days: Original Soundtrack |
| "Free Will" (featuring Dok2) | 2015 | 45 | * | Hawwah |
| "Guilty" | 2015 | 51 | * | Hawwah |
| "Two Women" | 2015 | 72 | * | Hawwah |
| "The First Temptation" | 2015 | 74 | * | Hawwah |
| "Must Have Love" (featuring Eric Nam) | 2015 | 21 | * | When The Twelve O'Clock (Digital single) |
"—" denotes releases that did not chart.

== Filmography ==
=== Television ===
| Year | Title | Role |
|---|---|---|
| 2005 | Let's Coke Play! Battle Shinhwa | Herself |
| 2008 | I Need a Family | Herself |
| 2009–11 | We Got Married | Herself |
| 2010–11 | All My Love | Hwang Geum-ji |
| 2014 | Hara's ON & OFF | Herself |
| 2015 | Off to School | Herself |
| 2015 | Hello Counselor | Guest |
| 2016 | Knowing Bros Ep 43 | Guest |
| 2016 | Golden Tambourine | Guest |

=== Films ===
| Year | Title | Role | Notes |
|---|---|---|---|
| 2009 | Closer to Heaven | Seo Jin-hee | |
| 2013 | The Huntresses | Ga-bi | |
| 2015 | Love Forecast | Joon-soo's ex-girlfriend | Cameo |

=== Music videos ===
List of music videos, showing year released and director
| Title | Year | Director(s) | Other version(s) |
|---|---|---|---|
| "Must Have Love" | 2006 | Unknown | |
| "Irreversible" | 2010 | Hwang Soo-ah | * Dance version |
| "For You Not to Know" | 2010 | Unknown | |
| "Someone Else" | 2012 | Unknown | |
| "Bloom" | 2012 | Hwang Soo-ah | |
| "Nostalgia" | 2012 | Unknown | |
| "One of Gain" | 2012 | Unknown | |
| "Brunch" | 2013 | Unknown | |
| "Gentleman" | 2013 | | |
| "Fxxk U" | 2014 | Hwang Soo-ah | |
| "Truth or Dare" | 2014 | Hwang Soo-ah | Performance version |
| "Paradise Lost" | 2015 | Hwang Soo-ah | |
| "Apple" | 2015 | Unknown | |

== Awards and nominations ==
| Year | Award | Category | Nominated work | Result |
|---|---|---|---|---|
| 2009 | Cyworld Digital Music Awards | Song of the Month (December) | "I Happen to Love You" (with Jo Kwon) | Won |
| 2010 | Cyworld Digital Music Awards | Song of the Month (January) | "I Happen to Love You" (with Jo Kwon) | Won |
| 2010 | Gaon Chart Grand Opening Awards | January Week 1 Digital Chart Overall No. 1 | "I Happen to Love You" (with Jo Kwon) | Won |
| 2010 | Gaon Chart Grand Opening Awards | January Week 2 Digital Chart Overall No. 1 | "I Happen to Love You" (with Jo Kwon) | Won |
| 2010 | Gaon Chart Grand Opening Awards | January Week 3 Digital Chart Overall No. 1 | "I Happen to Love You" (with Jo Kwon) | Won |
| 2010 | Gaon Chart Grand Opening Awards | January Week 4 Ringback tone No. 1 | "I Happen to Love You" (with Jo Kwon) | Won |
| 2010 | Melon Music Awards | Song of the Year | "I Happen to Love You" (with Jo Kwon) | Nominated |
| 2010 | Melon Music Awards | Netizen Popularity Song | "I Happen to Love You" (with Jo Kwon) | Nominated |
| 2010 | Melon Music Awards | Hot Trend Song Award | Irreversible | Nominated |
| 2010 | Melon Music Awards | Music Video of the Year | Irreversible | Won |
| 2010 | 12th Mnet Asian Music Awards | Best Music Video | Irreversible | Nominated |
| 2010 | 12th Mnet Asian Music Awards | Best Collaboration | "I Happen to Love You" (with Jo Kwon) | Won |
| 2010 | Bugs Music Awards | Song of the Year | "I Happen to Love You" (with Jo Kwon) | Nominated |
| 2010 | Bugs Music Awards | Best Duet (Gold) | "I Happen to Love You" (with Jo Kwon) | Won |
| 2010 | MBC Entertainment Awards | Show, Variety Female Rookie Award | We Got Married | Won |
| 2010 | MBC Entertainment Awards | Best Couple Award with Jo Kwon | We Got Married | Won |
| 2010 | 25th Golden Disk Awards | Digital Music Bonsang | Irreversible | Nominated |
| 2010 | 25th Golden Disk Awards | Popularity Award | Herself | Nominated |
| 2010 | 20th Seoul Music Awards | Bonsang Awards | Irreversible | Nominated |
| 2010 | 20th Seoul Music Awards | Popularity Award | Herself | Nominated |
| 2011 | 1st SBS MTV Best of the Best | Artist of the Year | Herself | Nominated |
| 2012 | 14th Mnet Asian Music Awards | Best Female Artist | Herself | Nominated |
| 2012 | 14th Mnet Asian Music Awards | Best Collaboration Performance | Someone Else (with JYP) | Nominated |
| 2012 | 14th Mnet Asian Music Awards | Best Music Video | Bloom | Nominated |
| 2012 | 14th Mnet Asian Music Awards | Artist of the Year | Herself | Nominated |
| 2012 | 14th Mnet Asian Music Awards | Style in Music Award | Herself | Won |
| 2012 | 2nd SBS MTV Best of the Best | Best Solo Female | Herself | Nominated |
| 2012 | 2nd SBS MTV Best of the Best | Best Collaboration | Someone Else (with JYP) | Nominated |
| 2012 | 2nd Gaon Chart K-Pop Awards | Song of the Year (October) | Bloom | Won |
| 2012 | 22nd Seoul Music Awards | Bonsang Award | Bloom | Nominated |
| 2012 | 22nd Seoul Music Awards | Popularity Award | Herself | Nominated |
| 2013 | 10th Korean Music Awards | Pop Song of the Year | Bloom | Nominated |
| 2015 | 17th Mnet Asian Music Awards | Best Dance Performance – Solo | "Paradise Lost" | Nominated |
| 2015 | 17th Mnet Asian Music Awards | Song of The Year | "Paradise Lost" | Nominated |
| 2016 | 18th Mnet Asian Music Awards | Best Music Video | "Carnival (The Last Day)" | Nominated |
