= Talk About S =

EP by Gain
- Released: October 5, 2012
- Recorded: 2012
- Genres: Electronic; dance-pop
- Length: 18:57
- Language: Korean
- Label: LOEN Entertainment
- Producers: Lee Min-soo (exec.); Kim Eana; Jeong Seok-won; KZ; Postino; Yoon Jong-shin; Junjaman

Gain chronology
Step 2/4 (2010)	Talk About S (2012)	Romantic Spring (2013)

Singles from Talk About S
- 1. "Bloom" Released: October 5, 2012; 2. "Nostalgia" Released: November 30, 2012

Music video
- "Bloom" on YouTube "Nostalgia" on YouTube

Talk About S (stylized as Talk about S.) is the second extended play by South Korean singer and actress Gain. Released on October 5, 2012, the extended play was instead distributed solely by LOEN Entertainment, where she signed a solo contract back in 2011. Containing a total of five tracks that fall mostly in the genre of electronic and dance-pop, the extended play was Gain's first major release since her debut release Step 2/4 (2010), with the participation from long-time lyricist Kim Eana and producer Lee Min-soo, who also acted as the release's executive producer. Other producers also participated in producing the album, including Jeong Seok-won, KZ, Postino and Yoon Jong-shin, who also contributed vocally to one song in the extended play.

Upon its release, Talk about S received positive reviews from critics for its "sensual" nature and showcasing Gain's musical flexibility. It also attained commercial success for the singer, becoming her second top-two entry on the Gaon Album Chart and to date, her most best-selling release in South Korea. The extended play also spawned two singles, with "Bloom" becoming one of the singer's signature hits and to date, her most successful single in South Korea, reaching number two on the Gaon Digital Chart. The single eventually received several nominations, notably including the Bonsang Prize at the 22nd Seoul Music Awards and Best Pop Song at the 2012 Korean Music Awards, eventually winning Gain her first award for Song of the Year – October at the 2012 Gaon Chart K-Pop Awards.

== Background and release ==
After wrapping up the initial promotion for her home group's fourth studio album Sixth Sense (2011), it was reported that Gain would sign a contract with LOEN Entertainment for her future solo career and acting endeavors. After the release of Brown Eyed Girls' digital single "The Original", it was announced that Gain would be releasing her second mini-album in October 2012, titled Talk About S. During an interview with Nylon in February 2013, the singer revealed that the initial "S" could be "referred to sex, sexual or even secret", further confirming the letter as a "combination" of those interpretations, citing it as "the start point for so many other words". Gain eventually confirmed that she would go "further" in this release, as it was prepared with an R-19 rating due to its "sensual" approach.

Prior to the extended play's release, a music video teaser for the opening track "Tinkerbell" was released on September 25, 2012, followed by audio preview for the other album tracks until September 28, 2012. The music video teaser for "Bloom" was then uploaded onto Youtube on October 4, a day prior to its video premiere and the album's release.

== Composition ==
"Tinkerbell"
A 26-second sample of the song's chorus, with electric guitar elements. The song was described as "an invitation to a midnight tryst" while featuring heavy synthesized elements.

"The Gaze"
A 22-second sample of the chorus of "The Gaze". The song is the only duet in Talk About S.

Musically, Talk About S incorporates hugely elements from dance-pop and electronic, while it also interpolates other genres, such as jazz and R&B. Aside from the executive producer Jo Yeong-cheol, frequent lyricist Kim Eana and producer Lee Min-soo, the album also features productions from Jeong Seok-won, Postino, KZ, Yoon Jong-shin, and Junjaman, who had previously remixed Brown Eyed Girls' single "My Style". Lyrically, the album focuses on themes such as love, sex, and relationship.

The extended play opens with "Tinkerbell" (Korean: 팅커벨; RR: Tingkeobel), described as an IDM-pop track with "damaged, half-deleted" Latin guitar while running through synthesized wobbly low-frequency oscillation chords with many "violent jump cuts", blowing riffs and a four-bar break. The lyrics, using characters such as Tinkerbell and Peter Pan as metaphors, describes "a coy invite to a midnight tryst". It also featured Gain's breathy, airy vocal style which was requested by the producer. The second track "Tiredness" is a dance-pop with R&B influences with a melodic piano, keyboard and background riffs during the chorus, while its third track "Bloom" is described as a "delightful Madonna throwback" with a funky riff, while talking about a girl became a real woman through love. It was proceeded by "The Gaze", a "jazzy and laid-back " track, described as "the lethargic, tender bedroom moment". The song features the vocal from its co-composer Yoon, who would later become Gain's fellow labelmate following her movement to Mystic's subsidiary label APOP in July 2014. Meanwhile, the last track "Catch Me If You Can" is an uptempo dance-pop song with bright synths and horns.

== Singles and promotion ==
Following the extended play's tracklist announcement, "Bloom" was announced as the lead single for Talk About S. It was released in conjunction to its parental EP on October 5, 2012 to great commercial success, peaking at number two on both the Gaon Digital Chart and Billboard Korea K-Pop Hot 100. To promote the extended play, Gain made her first comeback stage on Music Bank (KBS) on October 5, 2012, the album's release date, followed by performances on Show! Music Core (MBC) and The Music Trend (SBS), performing the title track while the opening track "Tinkerbell" was performed only on the first and the third show. She then went on to appear in many television programs to promote the album, such as Strong Heart (SBS), Good Day Hope Concert, and You Hee-yeol's Sketchbook (KBS). The promotion was wrapped up by her performances at 2012 Mnet Asian Music Awards (as part of the "Lady Mamalady" section with Sistar and Hyuna) and the 2nd Gaon Chart K-Pop Awards.

== Critical reception ==
Professional ratings
Review scores
Source	Rating
IZM	3.5/5 stars
Pitchfork Media	(positive)

Jakob Dorof from Pitchfork Media called the extended play "excellent", further praising Gain for using her solo career "to test the limits of both Korea's mainstream music and morals". He also picked "Tinkerbell" as part of the "20 Essential K-Pop Songs" list. Writer Hwang Sun-eob from IZM also praised the release, citing it as a "fair" showcase of Gain's musical flexibility, further growing away from the comparison to singer-songwriter IU.

== Chart performance ==
Talk about S achieved commercial success upon its release. It was Gain's second top-two entry on the Gaon Album Chart, being held off the top spot by TVXQ's sixth studio album Catch Me for the week of October 13, 2020, further tying with her debut release as the highest charting entry on the chart. The extended play eventually finished as the ninth best-selling release of October 2012 on the monthly Gaon Album Chart issue, having sold a total of 9,855 copies.

== Track listing ==
CD/Digital download
No.	Title	Lyrics	Music	Length
1.	"Tinkerbell" (팅커벨; Tingkeobel)	Kim Eana	Jeong Seok-won	3:15
2.	"Tiredness" (그녀를 만나; Geunyeoreul Manna)	Kim Eana	KZ	3:32
3.	"Bloom" (피어나; Pieona)	Kim Eana	Lee Min-soo	3:48
4.	"The Gaze" (시선; Siseon, featuring Yoon Jong-shin)	Yoon Jong-shin	Yoon Jong-shin, Postino	4:49
5.	"Catch Me If You Can"	D'Day	Junjaman, KZ	3:33
Total length:				18:57

== Charts ==
Chart (2012)	Peak position
South Korean (Gaon Album Chart)	2

== Awards and nominations ==
=== Annual music awards ===
Year	Award	Category	Recipient	Result
2012	2nd Gaon Chart K-Pop Awards	Song of the Year – October	"Bloom"	Won
2012	14th Mnet Asian Music Awards	Artist of the Year	Gain	Nominated
2012	14th Mnet Asian Music Awards	Best Female Artist	Gain	Nominated
2012	14th Mnet Asian Music Awards	Best Music Video	"Bloom"	Nominated
2012	14th Mnet Asian Music Awards	Style in Music	Gain	Won
2012	22nd Seoul Music Awards	Bonsang (Main Prize)	"Bloom"	Nominated
2012	22nd Seoul Music Awards	Popularity Award	Gain	Nominated
2013	10th Korean Music Awards	Best Pop Song	"Bloom"	Nominated

=== Music program awards ===
Song	Program	Date
"Bloom"	M! Countdown (Mnet)	October 18, 2012

== Release history ==
Region	Date	Format	Label
South Korea	October 5, 2012	CD, digital download	LOEN Entertainment
Worldwide	October 5, 2012	Digital download	LOEN Entertainment
