= Kobellite =

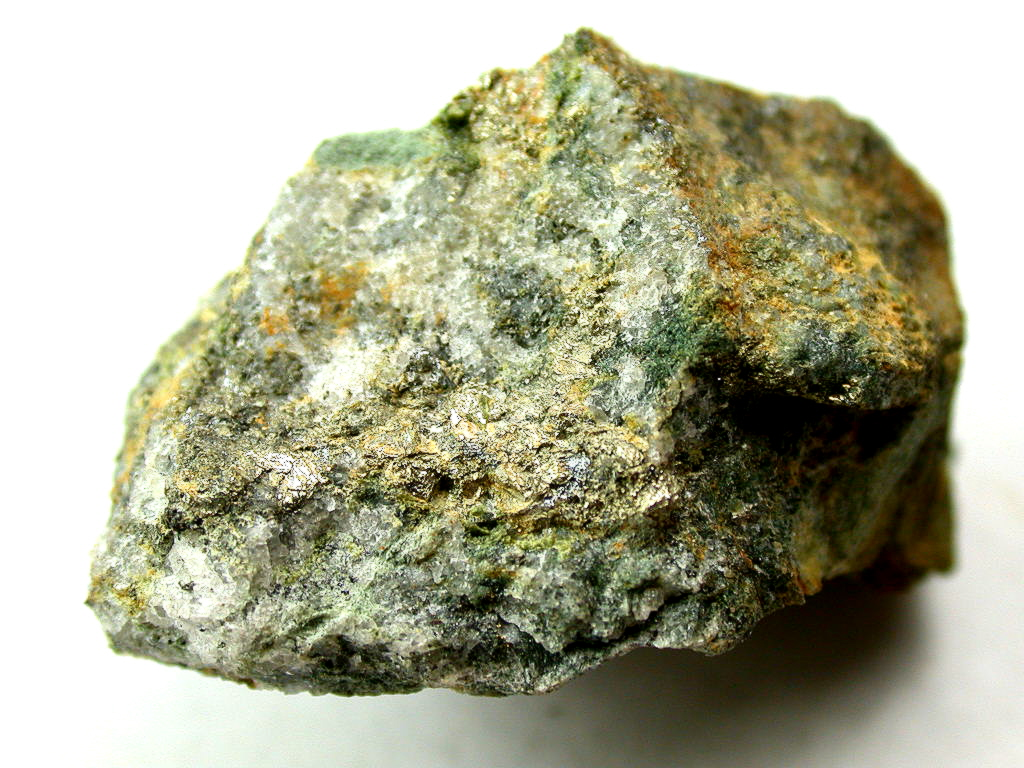

General
- Category: Sulfide minerals
- Formula: Pb_{22}Cu_{4}(Bi,Sb)_{30}S_{69}
- IMA symbol: Kbl
- Strunz classification: 2.HB.10a
- Crystal system: Orthorhombic
- Crystal class: Dipyramidal (mmm); H-M symbol: (2/m 2/m 2/m)
- Space group: Pnnm (no. 58)

Identification

Kobellite is a gray, fibrous, metallic mineral with the chemical formula Pb_{22}Cu_{4}(Bi,Sb)_{30}S_{69}. It is also a sulfide mineral consisting of antimony, bismuth, and lead. It is a member of the izoklakeite – berryite series with silver and iron substituting in the copper site and a varying ratio of bismuth, antimony, and lead. It crystallizes with monoclinic pyramidal crystals. The mineral can be found in ores and deposits of Hvena, Sweden; Ouray, Colorado; and Wake County, North Carolina, US. The mineral was named after Wolfgang Franz von Kobell (1803–1882), a German mineralogist.

== See also ==
- List of minerals
- List of minerals named after people
