= Kim Eana =

South Korean lyricist (born 1979)

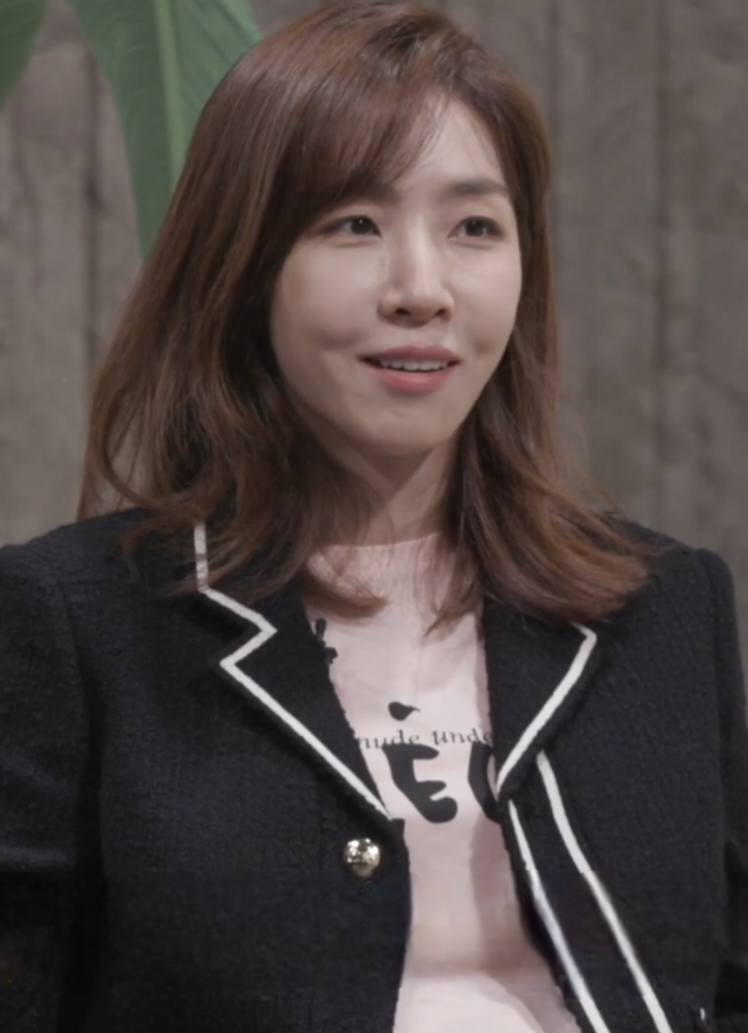
- Kim in 2021

Background information
- Born: April 27, 1979 (age 47)
- Origin: South Korea
- Genre: K-pop
- Occupation: Lyricist
- Years active: 2003–present
- Label: Mystic Story
- Website: www.mystic89.net/creator/kim-eana

Korean name
- Hangul: 김이나
- RR: Gim Ina
- MR: Kim Ina

Kim Eana (Korean: 김이나; born April 27, 1979) is a South Korean lyricist. She is best known for writing the lyrics to hit K-pop songs, including "Abracadabra" performed by Brown Eyed Girls and "Good Day" performed by IU. She has been active since 2003.

== Career ==
Kim is a songwriter who has written numerous number-one songs on the Korean pop music charts. She has collaborated with Lee Min-soo and has written lyrics for 24K, Son Dam-bi, Shinee, Brown Eyed Girls, IU, VIXX, Exo-CBX, Younha and Sunny Hill.

Kim is a lyricist, and has also participated in the promotional and music video aspects of the careers of the artists she has worked with.

Since 2015, she has hosted Two Yoo Project Sugar Man, a variety show focused on song production. She also serves as a panelist for the dating reality show Heart Signal.

== Style ==
Kim's work often straddles the line between typical love songs found in popular music and broader tones of social critique or commentary on the entertainment industry. There have been instances when she has offered possible interpretations to her works through social media websites. She said in an interview that her inspirations to write songs are Tablo (from Epik High) and G-Dragon (from Big Bang).

== Philanthropy ==
On March 8, 2022, Kim donated ₩10 million to the Hope Bridge Disaster Relief Association to help those affected by the massive wildfires that started in Uljin, Gyeongbuk, and also spread to Samcheok, Gangwon.

== Songwriting credits ==
Name of song, featured performers, original release, and year of release
Song	Artist	Album	Year
"Darling"	Doh Kyungsoo	Non-album single	2026
"11:11"	Taeyeon	My Voice	2016
"Abracadabra"	Brown Eyed Girls	Sound-G	2009
"Apple"	Gain (feat. Jay Park)	Hawwah	2015
"Bloom" (피어나)	Gain	Talk About S	2012
"Breath" (숨)	Park Hyo-shin	I Am a Dreamer	2016
"Candy Jelly Love"	Lovelyz	Girls' Invasion	2014
"Candy Man"	Brown Eyed Girls	Sound-G	2009
"Classified"	Oh My Girl	Dreamy Resonance	2024
"Cupid"	Oh My Girl	Oh My Girl	2015
"Destiny"	TVXQ	Catch Me	2012
"Drawer"	Kim Jaejoong	No.X	2016
"Dream"	Suzy and Baekhyun	Non-album single	2016
"Dreamer"	History (narr. IU)	Just Now	2015
"The Dreamer (I Am a Dreamer)"	Park Hyo-shin	I Am a Dreamer	2016
"Error"	VIXX	Error	2014
"Eternity" (기적)	VIXX	Eternity	2014
"Every End of the Day" (하루 끝)	IU	Spring of a Twenty Year Old	2012
"Everybody Has Secrets" (누구나 비밀은 있다	IU (feat. Gain)	Modern Times	2013
"Fire"	Mad Clown (feat. Jinsil)	Piece of Mine	2015
"Fxxk U"	Gain (feat. Bumkey)	Truth or Dare	2014
"Good Day" (좋은 날)	IU	Real	2010
"Goodnight, Like Yesterday" (어제처럼 굿나잇)	Lovelyz	Girls' Invasion	2014
"G.R.8.U" (대.다.나.다.너)	VIXX	Hyde	2013
"The Grasshopper Song" (베짱이 찬가)	Sunny Hill	The Grasshoppers	2012
"Growing" (꽃이 핀다)	K.Will	RE:	2015
"Havana"	IU	Modern Times	2013
"Hello"	Shinee	Hello	2010
"Home"	Park Hyo-shin	I Am a Dreamer	2016
"Hyde"	VIXX	Hyde	2013
"Everybody Has Secrets" (누구나 비밀은 있다)	IU (feat. Gain)	Modern Times	2013
"I Am"	Ive	I've Ive	2023
"I Happen to Love You" (우리 사랑하게 됐어요)	Gain and Jo Kwon	Non-album single	2009
"I Need You" (니가필요해)	K.Will	I Need You	2012
"Ice Flower" (얼음꽃)	IU and Yuna Kim	Non-album single	2011
"If You Love Her"	Shinee	1 and 1	2016
"Irreversible" (돌이킬 수 없는)	Gain	Step 2/4	2010
"L.O.V.E"	Brown Eyed Girls	With L.O.V.E	2008
"Last Fantasy"	IU	Last Fantasy	2011
"Love Blossom"	K.Will	The 3rd Album, Pt. 2	2013
"Love Day"	Yang Yo-seob and Jung Eun-ji	'A Cube' For Season # Green	2012
"Lucky"	Exo	XOXO	2013
"Memory" (안녕, 우주)	Doyoung	Soar	2025
"Midnight Circus"	Sunny Hill	Midnight Circus	2011
"Modern Times"	IU	Modern Times	2013
"Nagging" (잔소리)	IU and Lim Seul-ong	Non-album single	2010
"Not Like This" (이게 아닌데)	IU	Real	2010
"O (Circle)"	Onew	Circle	2023
"Obliviate"	IU	Modern Times	2013
"On and On" (다칠 준비가 돼 있어)	VIXX	Non-album single	2013
"One Person's Story" (한 사람 얘기)	Davichi	Mystic Ballad	2013
"Only I Didn't Know" (나만 몰랐던 이야기)	IU	Real+	2011
"Paradise Lost"	Gain	Hawwah	2015
"Peppermint Chocolate" (썸남썸녀)	Mamamoo (with K.Will featuring Wheesung)	Hello	2014
"Piano Man"	Mamamoo	Piano Man	2014
"Please Don't..." (이러지마 제발)	K.Will	The 3rd Album, Pt. 1	2012
"The Real Reason Why We Broke Up" (우리가 헤어진 진짜 이유)	Younha	Just Listen	2013
"The Red Shoes" (분홍신)	IU	Modern Times	2013
"Ring X Ring"	Billlie	The Billage of Perception: Chapter One	2021
"Scary Fairy Tale" (잔혹동화)	IU	Real+	2011
"Sea of Moonlight" (달빛바다)	IU and Fiestar	LOEN Tree Summer Story	2012
"Secret" (비밀)	IU	Last Fantasy	2011
"Shine Your Light"	Park Hyo-shin	Non-album single	2015
"Sign"	Brown Eyed Girls	Sign	2009
"Sixth Sense"	Brown Eyed Girls	Sixth Sense	2011
"Snap"	Queendom Puzzle	Non-album single	2023
"Some Nights" (그런 밤)	Taeyeon	INVU	2022
"Sound of Winter" (겨울소리)	Park Hyo-shin	Non-album single	2018
"Tinkerbell" (팅커벨)	Gain	Talk About S	2012
"Tiredness" (그녀를 만나)	Gain	Talk About S	2012
"Trust in Me"	Lim Young-woong	Non-album single	2020
"Unheard Story" (묻지 못한 이야기)	Brown Eyed Girls	Your Story	2006
"Vista"	Fiestar	Non-album single	2012
"Voodoo Doll" (저주인형)	VIXX	Voodoo	2013
"Warmth" (온기)	Lim Young-woong	Non-album single	2024
"Walk With Me, Girl" (아이야, 나랑 걷자)	IU (feat. Choi Baek-ho)	Modern Times	2013
"When it snows in October"	Sung Si-kyung	Double Life; The Other Side	2003
"Whoo!"	Fiestar (feat. Eric Benét)	Non-album single	2013
"Wicked"	Fiestar (feat. Tiger JK)	Non-album single	2012
"Yes or No"	GroovyRoom (feat. Huh Yunjin & Crush)	Non-album single	2024
"You & I" (너랑 나)	IU	Last Fantasy	2011
"You Are A Miracle"	2013 SBS Gayo Daejeon	Non-album single	2013
"Youth"	Kihyun	Youth	2022

== Filmography ==
=== Television ===
Title	Year	Role	Ref.
Two Yoo Project Sugar Man	2015 (Season 1)	Host	
Two Yoo Project Sugar Man	2019 (Season 3)	Host	
Heart Signal	2017 (Season 1)	Panelist	
Heart Signal	2018 (Season 2)	Panelist	
Heart Signal	2020 (Season 3)	Panelist	
Heart Signal	2023 (Season 4)	Panelist	
Heart Signal	2026 (Season 5)	Panelist	
The Fan	2018	Host	
Studio Music Hall	2019 (Season 1)	Host	
Studio Music Hall	2020 (Season 2)	Host	
Phantom Singer	2020 (Season 3)	Judge	
Sing again (Season 1–3)	2020–present	Judge	
Youth Star	2022	Youth mentor	
Pet Me Pick Me	2022	Host	

=== Radio ===
Network	Title	Year	Role	Ref.
MBC	Kim Eana's Night Letter (김이나의 밤편지)	2019–2020	Host	
MBC	Kim Eana's Starry Night (김이나의 별이 빛나는 밤에)	2020–present	Host	

=== Web shows ===
Year	Title	Role	Ref.
2021	Ssangssang Invitational	Cast Member	
2022	Between Marriage and Divorce	Host	
2022	Witch Hunt 2022	Host	

== Books ==
- Kim, Eana (2015). 김이나의 작사법 [Kim Eana's Songwriting Method] (in Korean). Munhakdongne Publishing Group. ISBN 978-8-9546-3560-8.

== Accolades ==
=== Awards ===
Name of the award ceremony, year presented, category, nominee(s) of the award, and the result of the nomination
Award ceremony	Year	Category	Nominee / work	Result	Ref.
Gaon Chart Music Awards	2011	Lyricist of the Year	Kim Eana	Won	
Gaon Chart Music Awards	2012	Lyricist of the Year	Kim Eana	Won	
Gaon Chart Music Awards	2013	Lyricist of the Year	Kim Eana	Won	
Gaon Chart Music Awards	2015	Lyricist of the Year	Kim Eana	Won	
Korea First Brand Awards	2021	Radio DJ	Kim Eana's Starry Night	Won	
MBC Entertainment Awards	2022	Excellence Award, Radio Category	Kim Eana's Starry Night	Won	
MBC Entertainment Awards	2024	Top Excellence Award, Radio Category	Kim Eana's Starry Night	Won	
Melon Music Awards	2010	Songwriter Award	Kim Eana (with Lee Min-soo) "Nagging"	Won	

=== Listicles ===
Name of publisher, year listed, name of listicle, and placement
Publisher	Year	Listicle	Placement	Ref.
Golden Disc Awards	2025	Golden Disc Powerhouse 40	Placed	
