= Bloom (Gain song) =

2012 single by Gain

Single by Gain

from the EP Talk About S
- Released: October 5, 2012
- Recorded: July 12, 2012
- Genre: K-pop; dance-pop; funk
- Length: 3:48
- Label: LOEN Entertainment
- Songwriter: Kim Eana
- Producer: Lee Min-soo

Gain singles chronology
"Take Out" (2012)	"Bloom" (2012)	"Nostalgia" (2012)

Music video
- "Bloom" on YouTube

"Bloom" (Korean: 피어나; RR: Pieona) is a song by South Korean recording artist Gain, from her second extended play Talk About S. It was written by Kim Eana, arranged and composed by Lee Min-soo. The song was released digitally as the lead single from the EP on October 5, 2012, by LOEN Entertainment.

A modern dance-pop song with funk influences, "Bloom" talks about the delightful and positive feelings of a girl while experiencing sex for the first time. Upon its release, "Bloom" was met with positive reviews from music critics and has been included in several publications K-pop best-of lists.

== Release ==
The video teaser for "Bloom" was released on October 4, 2012, through LOEN Entertainment's official YouTube channel. The song and its corresponding music video were released online, along with the whole extended play, on the following day.

== Accolades ==
"Bloom" received nominations for several awards, including Best Pop Song at the 10th Korean Music Awards and Best Music Video at the 2012 Mnet Asian Music Awards. Due to its success on digital platforms, it won Song of the Year (October) at the 2nd Gaon Chart Music Awards. It additionally received a music program award on Mnet's M Countdown on October 18, 2012.

"Bloom" on critic lists
Publication	List	Rank	Ref.
Billboard	100 Greatest K-Pop Songs of the 2010s	11	
IZM	Best Korean Singles of 2012	—	
Melon	Top 100 K-pop Songs of All Time	39	
Music Taste Y	Best Singles of 2012	9	
Music Taste Y	120 Best Dance Tracks of All Time	101	
Popjustice	Top 15 K‑Pop Singles of 2012	11	

== Chart performance ==
=== Weekly charts ===
Chart (2012)	Peak position
South Korean (Gaon)	2
South Korea (K-pop Hot 100)	2

=== Monthly charts ===
Chart (October 2012)	Peak position
South Korean (Gaon)	1

=== Year-end charts ===
Chart (2012)	Position
South Korean (Gaon)	42

== Sales ==
Country	Sales
South Korea (digital)	1,914,675+

== Release history ==
Region	Date	Formats	Label
South Korea	October 5, 2012	Digital download; streaming	LOEN Entertainment
Various	October 5, 2012	Digital download; streaming	LOEN Entertainment
