= MAMA Award for Best Collaboration =

Asian music award for collaborative performance

Mnet Asian Music Award for Best Collaboration
- Awarded for: Quality collaboration performances
- Country: South Korea
- Presented by: CJ E&M Pictures (Mnet)
- First award: 2010
- Currently held by: Rosé and Bruno Mars – "APT." (2025)
- Website: Mnet Asian Music Awards

The Mnet Asian Music Award for Best Collaboration is an award presented annually by CJ E&M Pictures (Mnet). It was first awarded at the 12th Mnet Asian Music Awards ceremony held in 2010, where singers Ga-in and Jo Kwon won the award for their song "I Happen to Love You". The award is given in honor for the artists with the most artistic achievement in collaboration performances in the music industry.

== Winners and nominees ==
Year^{[I]}	Performing artists	Work	Nominees
2010	Gain and Jo Kwon	"I Happen to Love You"	Homme — "I Was Able to Eat Well"; IU and Lim Seulong — "Nagging"; IU and Sung Si Kyung — "It's You"; Jeong Yeob and Seo Young Eun — "Spiteful Words"
2011	No award given		
2012	Trouble Maker	"Trouble Maker"	Davichi and T-ara - "We Were In Love"; J. Y. Park and Gain - "Someone Else"; Huh Gak and Zia - "I Need You"; Skull and Haha - "Busan Vacance"
2013	No award given		
2014	Soyou and Junggigo	"Some"	San E and Raina - "A Midsummer Night's Sweetness"; Seo In-guk and Zia - "Loved You"; Jung-in and Gary - "Your Scent"; Huh Gak and Eunji - "Break Up to Make Up"
2015	Zion.T and Crush (Note: Titled "Best Collaboration and Unit".)	"Just"	Bastarz - "Zero for Conduct"; VIXX LR - "Beautiful Liar"; Soyou and Kwon Jung Yeol - "Lean on Me"; Infinite H - "Pretty"
2016	Suzy and Baekhyun	"Dream"	MOBB – "HIT ME"; Park Kyung and Eunha – "Inferiority Complex"; BoA and Beenzino – "No Matter What"; Eric Nam and Wendy – "Spring Love"
2017	Dynamic Duo and Chen	"Nosedive"	Soyou and Baekhyun – "Rain"; IU and Oh Hyuk – "Can't Love You Anymore"; Hyolyn and Changmo – "Blue Moon"; Jay Park and Dok2 – "Most Hated"
2018	No award given		
2019	Lee So-ra featuring Suga	"Song Request"	Soyou and Ovan – "Rain Drop"; Jang Hye-jin and Yoon Min-soo – "Drunk on Love"; Changmo, Hash Swan, Ash Island and Kim Hyoeun – "Band"; Heize and Giriboy – "We Don't Talk Together"
2020	IU featuring Suga	"Eight"	J. Y. Park and Sunmi - "When We Disco"; Bolbbalgan4 featuring Baekhyun - "Leo"; Sung Si Kyung and IU - "First Winter"; Zico featuring Rain - "Summer Hate"
2021	AKMU and IU	"Nakka"	Coldplay and BTS – "My Universe"; Gaeko and Kwon Jin-ah – "I Feel Like"; Hyolyn and Dasom – "Summer or Summer"; Rain and J.Y. Park – "Switch to Me"
2022	Psy featuring Suga	"That That"	10cm and Big Naughty - "Just 10 Centimeters"; Crush featuring J-Hope - "Rush Hour"; Loco and Hwasa - "Somebody"; Woo Won-jae and Meenoi - "Ghosting"
2023	Jungkook featuring Latto	"Seven"	Anne Marie and Minnie – "Expectation"; Big Naughty featuring Lee Su-hyun – "Hopeless Romantic"; BSS featuring Lee Young-ji – "Fighting"; Taeyang featuring Jimin – "Vibe"
2024	Zico featuring Jennie	"Spot!"	GroovyRoom featuring Huh Yunjin and Crush – "Yes or No"; Jay Park featuring Natty – "Taxi Blurr"; Lee Young-ji featuring D.O. – "Small Girl"; Sung Si-kyung and Naul – "Even for a Moment"
2025	Rosé and Bruno Mars	"APT."	G-Dragon featuring Anderson .Paak – "Too Bad"; Jennie featuring Doechii – "ExtraL"; Mark featuring Lee Young-ji – "Fraktsiya"; V and Park Hyo-shin – "Winter Ahead"

== Multiple awards ==
3 awards

- Suga

2 awards

- IU
