= Step 2/4 =

EP by Gain
- Released: October 8, 2010
- Recorded: 2010
- Genre: K-pop; electronic; tango
- Length: 20:55
- Language: Korean
- Label: Nega Network; LOEN Entertainment
- Producer: Jo Yeong-cheol

Gain EP chronology
Step 2/4 (2010)	Talk About S (2012)

Singles from Step 2/4
- 1. "Irreversible" Released: October 8, 2010; 2. "Bad Temper" Released: December 21, 2010

Music video
- "Irreversible" on YouTube "Irreversible (Dance ver.)" on YouTube

Step 2/4 (stylized as step 2/4) is the debut solo extended play (EP) by South Korean singer and actress, Gain, a member from girl group Brown Eyed Girls. With the help of executive producer Jo Yeong-cheol and Lee Min-soo, the album was created with a sexy, spirited, striking and mature theme. It was released on October 8, 2010 and distributed by both Nega Network and LOEN Entertainment. The EP features six tracks in total.

Upon its release, the album quickly became a success, debuting at number two on the Gaon Weekly Albums Chart. It went on to sell approximately 9,700 copies, only after her sophomore release Talk About S (2012). It also received critical acclaim from music critics, praising its strong tango influence and the "distinctive persona", with some calling it "one of those unexpected masterpieces that come around only once every often."

Two singles were released from the EP, with the lead single, "Irreversible", became her first massive solo hit. An unreleased track from the album, "Bad Temper", was released as a digital single on December 21, 2010 to modest success.

== Background and composition ==
In 2010, it was announced that the members of girl group Brown Eyed Girls would start their own solo careers, beside their group activities. Following this announcement, Gain was revealed to be the second member to pursue a solo career after Narsha's solo debut.

The album was produced executively by Jo Young-cheol, who would later go on to be the executive producer of her materials, along with collaborators like lyricist Kim Eana and producer Lee Min-soo. The album also featured productions from Ra.D and Saint Binary, who had previously remixed for Brown Eyed Girls' previous hit "Hold the Line". Musically, the album is a K-pop record blended with tango music and dance-pop while focusing on topics such as love, seduction and personal stories.

== Singles ==
=== "Irreversible" ===
"Irreversible" (Korean: 돌이킬 수 없는; RR: Dorikil Su Eopneun) is the album's lead track, written by Kim Eana with producer Yoon Sang and Lee Min-soo, who have been working with Brown Eyed Girls for a long time. A dance-pop song combines with tango, it tells the story of a girl trying to keep the relationship with her lover though he is abandoning her. Prior to the release of "Irreversible", two teaser videos were released online. The 10-minute-long music video was premiered on October 8, 2010, followed by a choreography-centered version two days later. The song became her first (and currently her only solo single as a lead artist) to top the Gaon Singles Chart.

=== "Bad Temper" ===
Previously an unreleased track during the creation of the album, "Bad Temper" was released digitally, as a Christmas gift to her fans for their supports of her solo debut, on December 21, 2010, with a short video clip using the behind-the-scene cuts from her "Irreversible" music video. The song debuted and peaked at number eleven on the Gaon Singles Chart. It received a R-19 rating due to the lyrics.

== Release and promotion ==
Although originally intended to be released in August 2010, the EP was pushed back to October of that year due to the singer's home group promoting their Japanese debut in August. Prior to the release of the album, two teaser videos for the lead single were revealed online on October 3 and 5, respectively.

Gain made her solo debut stage on Music Bank (KBS) on October 8, 2010, the album's release date, followed by performances on Show! Music Core (MBC) and The Music Trend (SBS), performing the lead track while "Truth" (Korean: 진실; RR: Jinsil) was only seen being performed on Music Bank. She then performed "Irreversible" again for SBS's Love Sharing Concert on November 14.

== Track listing ==
CD/Digital download
No.	Title	Lyrics	Music	Length
1.	"Nitchell (Baby-G Mix)"	Saint Binary	Saint Binary	2:10
2.	"Irreversible" (돌이킬 수 없는; Dorikil Su Eopneun)	Kim Eana	Yoon Sang, Lee Min-soo	3:48
3.	"Tango the Night"	Bak Chang-hak	Haihm	3:56
4.	"Esperando"	Ra.D	Grace Eun, Ra.D	4:01
5.	"The One Who Sings (歌人)" (가인, Gain)	Kim Eana	Saint Binary	3:33
6.	"Truth" (진실, Jinsil)	Kim Eana	Yoon Sang	3:33
Total length:				20:55

Digital download only
No.	Title	Lyrics	Music	Length
1.	"Bad Temper"	Kim Eana	Lee Min-soo	3:30
Total length:				4:24

== Charts ==
Chart (2010)	Peak position	Sales
South Korean Gaon Weekly Albums Chart	2	KOR: 9,700+ (Note: Sales figures as of October 2010.)
South Korean Gaon Monthly Albums Chart	12	KOR: 9,700+
South Korean Gaon Year-End Albums Chart	—	KOR: 9,700+

== Awards and nominations ==
=== Annual music awards ===
Year	Award	Category	Recipient	Result
2010	2nd MelOn Music Awards	Hot Trend Song Award	"Irreversible"	Nominated
2010	2nd MelOn Music Awards	Music Video Award	"Irreversible"	Won
2010	12th Mnet Asian Music Awards	Best Music Video	"Irreversible"	Nominated
2010	25th Golden Disk Awards	Main Prize in Digital Releasing	"Irreversible"	Nominated
2010	25th Golden Disk Awards	Popularity Award	Gain	Nominated
2010	20th Seoul Music Awards	Bonsang (Main Prize)	"Irreversible"	Nominated
2010	20th Seoul Music Awards	Popularity Award	Gain	Nominated

=== Music program awards ===
Song	Program	Date
"Irreversible"	The Music Trend (SBS)	October 31, 2010

== Release history ==
Region	Date	Format	Label
South Korea	October 8, 2010	CD+DVD, digital download	LOEN Entertainment
Worldwide	October 8, 2010	Digital download	LOEN Entertainment

== See also ==
- List of number-one hits of 2010 (South Korea)
