= Gaon Weibo Chart =

Weekly K-pop chart

Gaon Weibo Chart, part of Gaon Chart, was a weekly chart that ranked the top 10 most popular K-pop groups and the top 30 most popular individual K-pop artists in China, using data from Weibo. This chart started the week of June 29, 2014. The artists with the most weeks at number one are Jung Yong-hwa with 69 weeks as an individual artist and BTS with 36 weeks as a group. The chart was discontinued in July 2017.

== List of number-one artists ==
=== 2014 ===
Source: Gaon Weibo Chart
Week end date	Group	Individual	Ref
July 7	EXO-K	Tao	
July 13	Super Junior	Tao	
July 20	Super Junior	Tao	
July 27	JYJ	Luhan	
August 3	EXO-M	Luhan	
August 10	EXO-M	Lay	
August 17	Super Junior	Luhan	
August 24	Super Junior	Luhan	
August 31	Super Junior	Luhan	
September 7	Super Junior	Luhan	
September 14	Super Junior	Luhan	
September 21	Super Junior	Luhan	
September 28	Super Junior	Luhan	
October 5	Super Junior	Luhan	
October 12	Super Junior	Luhan	
October 19	Super Junior	Luhan	
October 26	Super Junior	Sehun	
November 2	Super Junior	Sehun	
November 9	Super Junior	Sehun	
November 16	Super Junior	Sehun	
November 23	Super Junior	Jung Yong-hwa	
November 30	Super Junior	Jung Yong-hwa	
December 7	Super Junior	Jung Yong-hwa	
December 14	Super Junior	Jung Yong-hwa	
December 21	Got7	Jung Yong-hwa	
December 28	Got7	Jung Yong-hwa	

=== 2015 ===
Source: Gaon Weibo Chart
Week end date	Group	Individual	Ref
January 4	Shinhwa	Jung Yong-hwa	
January 11	Got7	Jung Yong-hwa	
January 18	Super Junior	Jung Yong-hwa	
January 25	Super Junior	Jung Yong-hwa	
February 1	Super Junior	Jung Yong-hwa	
February 8	Super Junior	Jung Yong-hwa	
February 15	Super Junior	Jung Yong-hwa	
February 22	Super Junior	Jung Yong-hwa	
March 1	Shinhwa	Jung Yong-hwa	
March 8	Shinhwa	Jung Yong-hwa	
March 15	Shinhwa	Jung Yong-hwa	
March 22	Shinhwa	Jung Yong-hwa	
March 29	Shinhwa	Jung Yong-hwa	
April 5	EXO-M	Jung Yong-hwa	
April 12	EXO-M	Jung Yong-hwa	
April 19	EXO-M	Jung Yong-hwa	
April 26	BTS	Jung Yong-hwa	
May 3	BTS	Jung Yong-hwa	
May 10	BTS	Jung Yong-hwa	
May 17	Infinite	Jung Yong-hwa	
May 24	Infinite	Jung Yong-hwa	
May 31	Infinite	Jung Yong-hwa	
June 7	Big Bang	Jung Yong-hwa	
June 14	Big Bang	Jung Yong-hwa	
June 21	BTS	Jung Yong-hwa	
June 28	Infinite	Jung Yong-hwa	
July 5	BigBang	Jung Yong-hwa	
July 12	Super Junior	Jung Yong-hwa	
July 19	Super Junior	Jung Yong-hwa	
July 26	Infinite	Jung Yong-hwa	
August 2	Infinite	Jung Yong-hwa	
August 9	BigBang	Jung Yong-hwa	
August 16	BigBang	Jung Yong-hwa	
August 23	CNBLUE	Jung Yong-hwa	
August 30	F.T. Island	Jung Yong-hwa	
September 6	CNBLUE	Jung Yong-hwa	
September 13	CNBLUE	Jung Yong-hwa	
September 20	CNBLUE	Lay	
September 27	Got7	Jung Yong-hwa	
October 4	CNBLUE	Jung Yong-hwa	
October 11	Got7	Jung Yong-hwa	
October 18	Super Junior	Jung Yong-hwa	
October 25	CNBLUE	Jung Yong-hwa	
November 1	Teen Top	Jung Yong-hwa	
November 8	CNBLUE	Jung Yong-hwa	
November 15	CNBLUE	Jung Yong-hwa	
November 22	CNBLUE	Jung Yong-hwa	
November 29	BigBang	Jung Yong-hwa	
December 6	BigBang	Jung Yong-hwa	
December 13	Beast	Jung Yong-hwa	
December 20	Beast	Jung Yong-hwa	
December 27	Beast	Jung Yong-hwa	

=== 2016 ===
Source: Gaon Weibo Chart
Week end date	Group	Individual	Ref
January 3	Big Bang	Jung Yong-hwa	
January 10	Beast	Jung Yong-hwa	
January 17	BigBang	Jung Yong-hwa	
January 24	BigBang	Jung Yong-hwa	
January 31	BigBang	Jung Yong-hwa	
February 7	Super Junior	Jung Yong-hwa	
February 14	BigBang	Jung Yong-hwa	
February 21	BigBang	Jung Yong-hwa	
February 28	BigBang	Jung Yong-hwa	
March 6	BigBang	Jung Yong-hwa	
March 13	BTS	Jung Yong-hwa	
March 20	BigBang	G-Dragon	
March 27	Shinhwa	G-Dragon	
April 3	Got7	G-Dragon	
April 10	VIXX	G-Dragon	
April 17	VIXX	G-Dragon	
April 24	BigBang	G-Dragon	
May 1	VIXX	G-Dragon	
May 8	Winner	G-Dragon	
May 15	BTS	G-Dragon	
May 22	Winner	G-Dragon	
May 29	BigBang	G-Dragon	
June 5	BTS	Lay	
June 12	F.T. Island	G-Dragon	
June 19	BigBang	G-Dragon	
June 26	BigBang	Jung Yong-hwa	
July 3	BTS	G-Dragon	
July 10	BTS	G-Dragon	
July 17	BigBang	G-Dragon	
July 24	BTS	Seungri	
July 31	BTS	G-Dragon	
August 7	Got7	Lay	
August 14	VIXX	Lay	
August 21	BigBang	G-Dragon	
August 28	VIXX	Lay	
September 4	BTS	Lay	
September 11	BTS	Lay	
September 18	Infinite	Lay	
September 25	Infinite	Lay	
October 2	BTS	Lay	
October 9	BTS	Lay	
October 16	BTS	Sehun	
October 23	BTS	Lay	
October 30	BTS	Lay	
November 6	BTS	Lay	
November 13	Got7	Lay	
November 20	BTS	Lay	
November 27	Got7	Lay	
December 4	Shinhwa	Lay	
December 11	BigBang	G-Dragon	
December 18	BigBang	Lay	
December 25	Shinhwa	Lay	

=== 2017 ===
Source: Gaon Weibo Chart
Week end date	Group	Individual	Ref
January 1	BTS	Lay	
January 8	Shinhwa	Lay	
January 15	Shinhwa	Lay	
January 22	Shinhwa	Lay	
January 29	BTS	Lay	
February 5	BTS	Lay	
February 12	BTS	Lee Min-ho	
February 19	BTS	Lay	
February 26	BTS	Lee Min-ho	
March 5	Got7	Lee Min-ho	
March 12	BTS	Lee Min-ho	
March 19	BTS	Lee Min-ho	
March 26	BTS	Lee Min-ho	
April 2	Got7	Lee Min-ho	
April 9	Big Bang	Henry Lau	
April 16	Teen Top	Lee Min-ho	
April 23	Got7	Jessica	
April 30	BTS	Lee Min-ho	
May 7	Got7	Lee Min-ho	
May 14	BTS	Lee Min-ho	
May 21	Got7	Lee Min-ho	
May 28	BTS	Lee Min-ho	
June 4	BTS	Lee Min-ho	
June 11	BTS	Lee Min-ho	
June 18	BTS	Lee Min-ho	
June 25	BTS	Lee Min-ho	

== Artists with the most weeks at number one ==
Source: Gaon Weibo Chart
#	Artist (group)	Total weeks	#	Artist (individual)	Total weeks
1	BTS	36	1	Jung Yong-hwa	69
2	Super Junior	30	2	Lay	28
3	Big Bang	25	3	G-Dragon	19
4	Got7	14	4	Lee Min-ho	17
5	Shinhwa	12	5	Luhan	12
