= Wolfgang Franz von Kobell =

German mineralogist and writer (1803–1882)

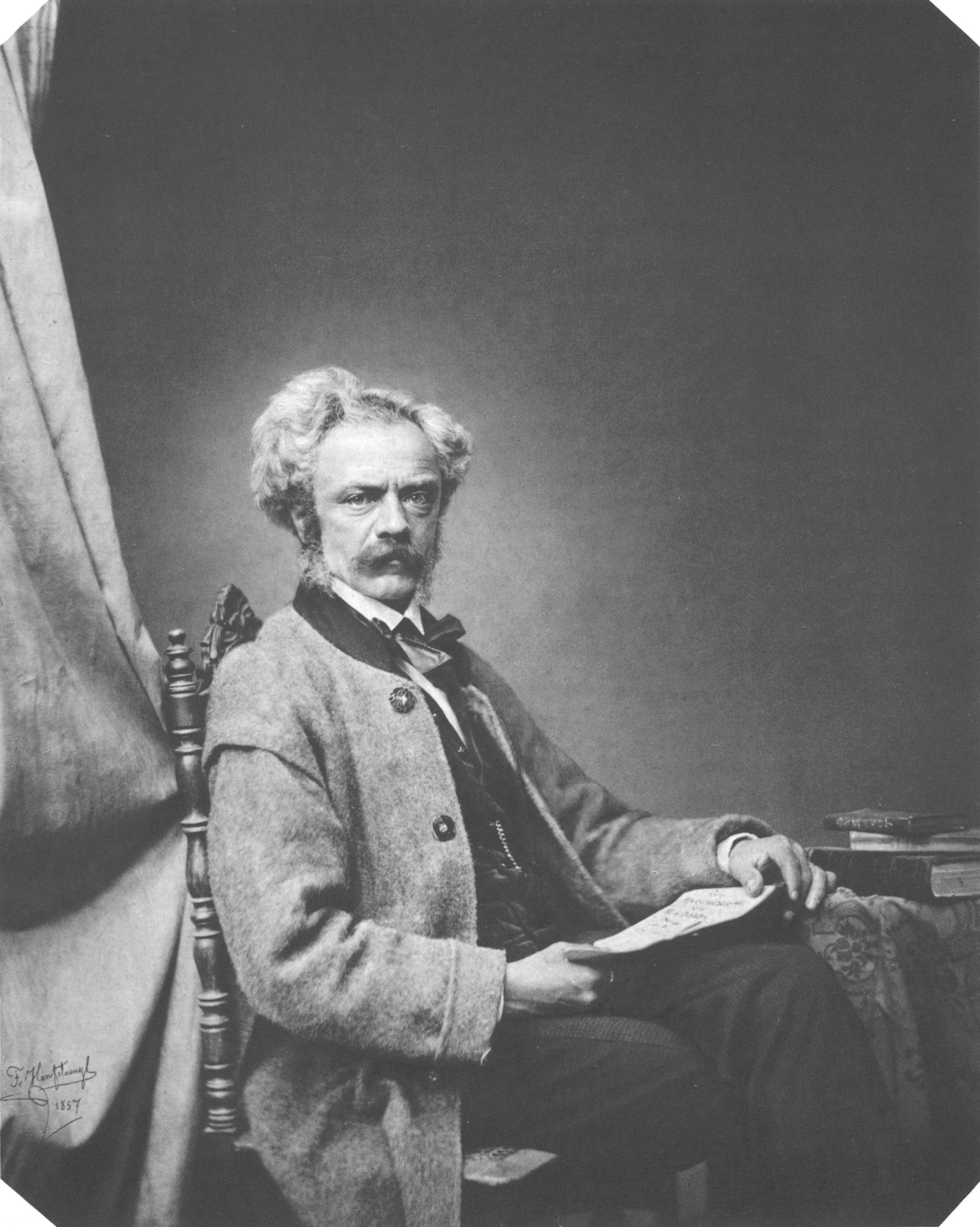
Franz von Kobell (1857)

Wolfgang Xavier Franz Ritter von Kobell (19 July 1803 – 11 November 1882) was a German mineralogist and writer of short stories and poems in Bavarian dialect.

== Biography ==
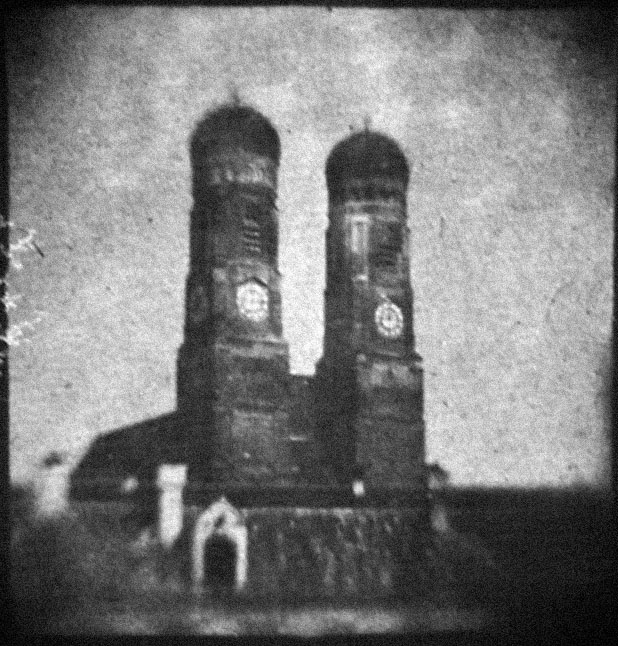
Early silver chloride paper photograph of Munich Frauenkirche, 1837

Kobell was born in Munich, Bavaria (where he also died), son of the painter Wilhelm Kobell. After studying mineralogy in Landshut, he became professor of mineralogy in 1826 at the Ludwig-Maximilians-Universität München, and in 1856 was appointed first curator of the Bavarian State collection of minerals. His greatest contributions were new methods in crystallography. In 1855, he invented the stauroscope for the study of the optical properties of crystals. The mineral kobellite is named after him, and he invented a comparative fusibility scale.

Besides his work as a mineralogist, Kobell is also famous for writing many short stories and poems in the Bavarian dialect of Upper Bavaria. He was among the regular hunting companions of the Bavarian dukes and monarchs. His best known work is a short story which was later used as base for the popular Bavarian stage play Der Brandner Kasper. The story is about a blacksmith from Tegernsee, who is visited by the grim reaper and tricks him into drinking and gambling for some further years on earth. The grim reaper has some issues with his management and convinces Kasper to stay in paradise, after he took a look into it, similar as in the Joshua ben Levi legend. The play was adapted 1974 for the stage by a grandnephew of Kobell, Kurt Wilhelm. There are different television and movie adaptations. Each year before All Saints' Day it is being sent by the Bayerischer Rundfunk (Bavarian Broadcasting Agency).

Kobell's writing shows great comic awareness and the ability to combine a rich sense of fantasy with realism. 1834 Kobell went for a study journey to Greece during the short term kingdom of King Otto of Greece and was member of different academies. He pioneered as well early photographic and photochemistry procedures together with Carl August von Steinheil.

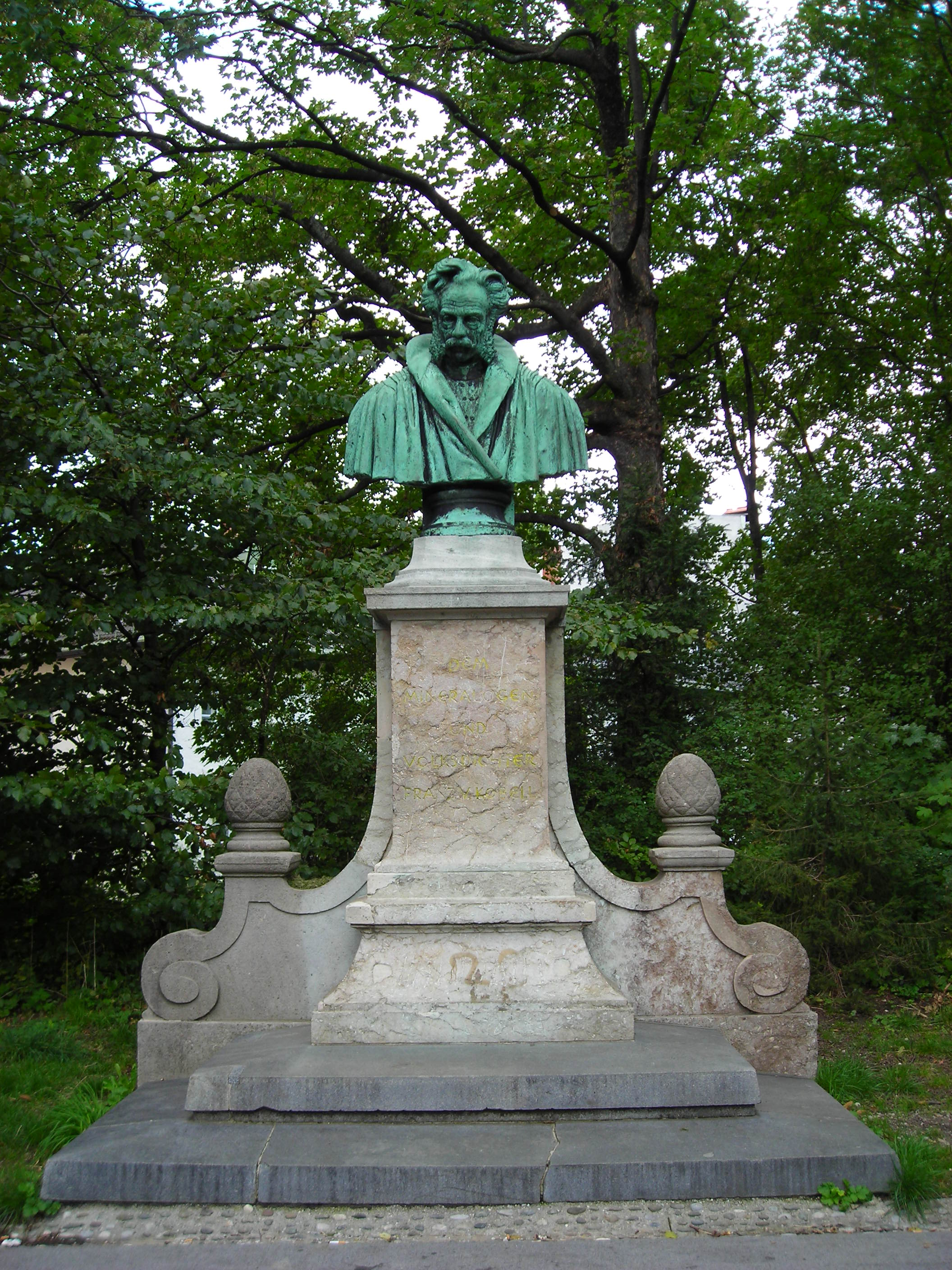
Monument for Franz von Kobell in the Alter Südfriedhof, Munich

== Works ==
=== Scientific ===
- Charakteristik der Mineralien (2 vols. 1830–1831)
- Tafeln zur Bestimmung der Mineralien (1833, and later editions; 12th ed. by Konrad Oebbeke, 1884; 13th ed. 1893)
- Grundzüge der Mineralogie (1838)
- Galvanographie (1842; 2d ed. 1846), describing a method of his own invention
- Skizzen aus dem Steinreich (1850)
- Die Mineralogie (1858) Digital edition by the University and State Library Düsseldorf
- Mineralogie: Populäre Vorträge (1862)
- Geschichte der Mineralogie von 1650–1860 (1864)

He was also the author of numerous scientific papers, and described many new minerals.

=== Works in dialect ===
- Schnadahüpfln und Sprüchln (2d ed. 1852)
- Gedichte in pfälzischer Mundart (1839–41)
- Jagd- und Weinlieder (1889)

== See also ==
- List of mineralogists
