= I Happen to Love You =

Single by Gain and Jo Kwon
- Released: December 17, 2009
- Recorded: 2009
- Genre: K-pop
- Length: 3:40
- Label: Loen Entertainment
- Composers: JeA; Lee Min-soo
- Lyricists: Kim Eana; Gain; Jo Kwon
- Producer: Lee Min-soo

Music video
- "I Happen to Love You" (2025) on YouTube

"I Happen to Love You" (Korean: 우리 사랑하게 됐어요; RR: Uri saranghage dwaesseoyo; lit. 'We Fell in Love') is a single by Gain and Jo Kwon released on December 17, 2009. The collaborative project resulted from Gain and Jo Kwon's pairing in the variety show We Got Married. It was the first song to top the newly-launched Gaon Digital Chart and to win the MAMA Award for Best Collaboration.

== Background ==
Brown Eyed Girls member Gain and 2AM member Jo Kwon were cast as a virtual couple, commonly referred to as the Adam Couple (아담커플), in the second season of the MBC variety show We Got Married from October 3, 2009 to January 15, 2011, becoming the first of many pairings between Korean idols on the program. They immediately received attention upon their first episode, which saw record high viewership ratings for the show. The pairing quickly grew popular with netizens: they topped various polls and surveys about Korean celebrity couples despite not actually dating, won the Best Couple Award and the Male and Female Rookie Awards at the 2010 MBC Entertainment Awards, and were cast for the MBC sitcom All My Love for You together. During their time on We Got Married, Gain and Jo Kwon decided to collaborate on a duet, with the intent of donating the song's proceeds to charity.

"I Happen to Love You" is an upbeat love song inspired by Christmas carols. Gain and Jo Kwon first performed the song live on the MBC Standard FM radio show Shimshimtapa on December 16, 2009. It was then digitally released on music streaming platforms the following day. The December 26, 2009 and January 2, 2010 episodes of We Got Married showed the writing and recording process of the song, with contributions from composer Lee Min-soo and lyricist Kim Eana, who previously worked on several of Brown Eyed Girls' songs such as "Abracadabra", and Brown Eyed Girls member JeA. Jo Kwon later released a self-composed demo that was rejected as the official duet on July 1, 2010 as his first solo single, titled "The Day I Confessed" (Korean: 고백하던 날; RR: Gobaekhadeon nal).

A total of ₩50 million from the song's proceeds were donated on February 11, 2010 via MBC Newsdesk to aid victims of the 2010 Haiti earthquake. Gain and Jo Kwon performed "I Happen to Love You" live as a special stage on the January 9, 2010 and February 20, 2010 episodes of MBC's Show! Music Core, the latter being a 200th episode special, as well as the 2011 MBC Korean Music Wave in Bangkok.

== Reception ==
"I Happen to Love You" quickly became popular, charting on the Gaon Digital Chart for fourteen consecutive weeks and topping it for three weeks. Gain and Jo Kwon's harmonies and the song's lyrics received praise, with the song being described as timely for the winter holidays and the "best couple song in the music industry" at its release. The song won two TV music program awards on KBS's Music Bank despite not being performed on the show, due to the song's performance on music charts.

== Remake ==
Gain and Jo Kwon, who remained friends for years after finishing their stint on We Got Married, teased a remake of "I Happen to Love You" via a video on Jo Kwon's social media accounts on December 3, 2025. The song was officially announced as part of the OST for the South Korean film Even If This Love Disappears From the World Tonight on December 8, with a teaser video released on December 13. On December 17, 2025, the 16th anniversary of the song's release, the 2025 version of "I Happen to Love You" was digitally released via BY4M Studio's Toon Studio, with a modernized arrangement and a new official English title. The song marked Gain's first music release since her hiatus from the entertainment industry after illegally using propofol in 2019.

== Track listing ==
I Happen to Love You
No.	Title	Lyrics	Music	Arrangements	Length
1.	"I Happen to Love You"	Kim Eana; Gain; Jo Kwon	JeA; Lee Min-soo	Lee Min-soo	3:40
2.	"I Happen to Love You" (Instrumental)		JeA; Lee Min-soo	Lee Min-soo	3:40
Total length:					7:20

I Happen to Love You (Original Soundtrack from Even If This Love Disappears Tonight)
No.	Title	Lyrics	Music	Arrangements	Length
1.	"I Happen to Love You (2025)"	Kim Eana; Gain; Jo Kwon	JeA; Lee Min-soo	Kevin_D; Stephen Lee; Yoon Dahye	3:33
2.	"I Happen to Love You (2025)" (Instrumental)		JeA; Lee Min-soo	Kevin_D; Stephen Lee; Yoon Dahye	3:33
Total length:					7:06

== Charts ==
=== Weekly charts ===
Chart performance for "I Happen to Love You"
Chart (2010)	Peak position
South Korea (Gaon)	1
South Korea (Gaon Mobile Ringtone Chart)	1

Chart performance for "I Happen to Love You" (2025)
Chart (2025)	Peak position
South Korea (Gaon)	162
South Korea (Gaon Download Chart)	8

=== Monthly charts ===
Chart performance for "I Happen to Love You"
Chart (January 2010)	Peak position
South Korea (Gaon)	2
South Korea (Gaon Mobile Ringtone Chart)	1

== Accolades ==
Awards and nominations for "I Happen to Love You"
Year	Organization	Award	Result	Ref.
2009	Cyworld Digital Music Awards	Song of the Month (December)	Won	
2010	Cyworld Digital Music Awards	Song of the Month (January)	Won	
2010	Bugs Music Awards	Best Duet	Won	
2010	Bugs Music Awards	Song of the Year	Nominated	
2010	Melon Music Awards	Netizen Popularity Award	Nominated	
2010	Mnet Asian Music Awards	Best Collaboration	Won	

Music program awards for "I Happen to Love You"
Program	Date	Ref.
Music Bank	January 15, 2010	
Music Bank	January 22, 2010	

== Sales ==
Country	Sales
South Korea (digital)	2,085,894

== See also ==
- "Nagging", a 2010 single by IU and Lim Seul-ong used as a theme song for We Got Married, unofficially called "I Happen to Love You 2" prior to its release
- "For First Time Lovers", a 2011 single by Jung Yong-hwa for We Got Married
