= Jo Kwon =

South Korean singer and actor

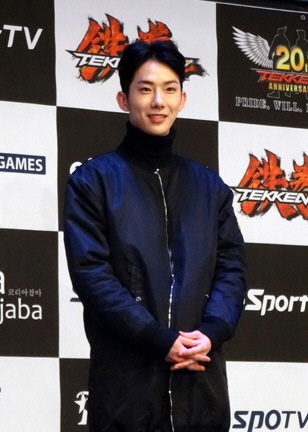
- Jo in January 2015
- Born: August 28, 1989 (age 37); Suwon, Gyeonggi, South Korea
- Occupations: Singer; dancer; actor; television host
- Musical career
- Genres: K-pop; R&B
- Instruments: Vocals; piano
- Years active: 2007–present
- Labels: Big Hit; JYP; Cube
- Member of: 2AM; United Cube

Korean name
- Hangul: 조권
- Hanja: 趙權
- RR: Jo Gwon
- MR: Cho Kwŏn

Signature
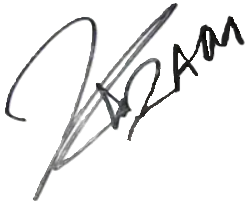

Jo Kwon (Korean: 조권; born August 28, 1989), is a South Korean singer, television host, actor, entertainer and the leader of South Korean boy band 2AM. He has starred in multiple musicals such as Jesus Christ Superstar playing the role of King Herod and Everybody's Talking About Jamie as Jamie New.

== Predebut ==
Jo trained at JYP Entertainment for seven years after joining the company. He was chosen as the last member of Park Jin-young's "99% Challenge Project" along with Sunye of Wonder Girls.

== 2AM career ==
In 2008, he appeared on Mnet's Hot Blood. The program showed the intense physical training that thirteen male trainees go through to acquire the opportunity to debut in either a four-member ballad group or a seven-member dance group. After several elimination steps, Jo was chosen for a position in the four-member ballad group 2AM. He became the group's leader.

2AM's first single "This Song" was released on July 21, 2008. In March 2015, Jo renewed his contract with JYP Entertainment, while three other members of 2AM signed with other agencies. JYP Entertainment assured that the departures did not mean 2AM was disbanding, however 2AM is currently on temporarily break from any group activities. He left JYP Entertainment on September 22, 2017. On November 3, 2017, he signed with Cube Entertainment.

== Solo career ==
=== 2008–2009: Variety entertainment and popularity as Adam Couple ===
Jo has appeared as a regular panel member on variety shows such as Star King. He was part of "Dirty Eyed Girls" in an episode of 2PM's variety show Wild Bunny, performing a parody of popular Brown Eyed Girls song "Abracadabra". The music video became popular. In September 2009, he was one of the main MCs for SBS' environmental variety show Find it! Green Gold with Super Junior member Shindong, SS501 member Kim Hyung-jun, and Fly To The Sky member Brian Joo. He also replaced Jay Park on historical culture variety show Nodaji.

He joined the cast of We Got Married on October 3, 2009, coupled with Brown Eyed Girls member Ga-In. Although he was initially only supposed to be featured in the Chuseok special, his appearance brought in the highest ratings yet for Season 2, so he was announced as a permanent couple. Jo was diagnosed with H1N1 on October 28, 2009, causing them to postpone filming We Got Married. He recovered quickly after treatment.

During his appearance in We Got Married, Jo and Ga-in were donned the nickname “Adam Couple” (아담커플) by fans. Together he released the digital single, "I Happen to Love You" (우리 사랑하게 됐어요), on December 17, 2009, which topped variety online music charts and won two awards on Music Bank's K-Charts and the "Most Popular Background Phone Music" on the Gaon Charts. 50 million won from the profits of the song were donated for rebuilding after the 2010 Haiti earthquake.

In 2010, he became a permanent cast member of Family Outing 2. He made his fifth appearance on the TV show "Happy Together" in June 2012. He made several appearances on Star King, Invincible Youth S2, Come To Play, Radio Star, Star Dance Battle, and many other shows. He is known for his kkab (깝) dance and often danced on variety shows. "Kkab" can be translated as hyperactive.

=== 2010–2012: Screen debut and first solo album ===
On June 30, 2010, Jo released his first solo digital single titled, 고백하던 날 (The Day I Confessed), a song he partially composed during the We Got Married broadcast for Ga-in. The song came first on Cyworld real-time charts the day after release.

The same year, he was cast in the sitcom All My Love for You with co-stars Park Mi-sun, Kim Kap-soo and fellow idol and former 'wife' from We Got Married Ga-in.

On June 25, 2012, he released his solo album, I'm Da One, along with a music video.

=== 2013: Musical and drama debut ===
In 2013, Jo joined the cast of a Korean Jesus Christ Superstar musical production, where he played the role of King Herod.

In the same year, on February 27, 2013, he was confirmed as one of the cast for the KBS2 drama Queen of the Office. The drama is about a talented contract worker, and the work and relationships that surround her.

=== 2016–2017: Second solo album, fourth musical casting, Golden Tambourine, and departure from JYP Entertainment ===
Jo's new album Crosswalk included three tracks, two of which he wrote ― the lead single, "Crosswalk," and the third track, "Flutter." The second track, "It's Okay," was written by Ryan S. Jhun and Denzil "DR" Remedios, the music producers of SM Entertainment's Shinee and f(x). Popular songwriters Esna and Aev produced the title song.

On March 17, 2016, it was announced by JYP Entertainment that Jo would be participating in the musical On The Starry Night as the role "Choi Sung-keun. The musical Ran from May 7 to May 15, 2016.

On November 10, 2016, it was announced that Jo Kwon would be co-starring on Golden Tambourine, a karaoke variety program broadcast by Mnet, which ran from December 15, 2016, until February 23, 2017.

On September 21, 2017, it was announced that Jo had officially left JYP Entertainment after 16 years. However, 2AM never announced that they were disbanding and it is presumed that the group is on hiatus.

On November 2, 2017, it was announced that Jo had signed with Cube Entertainment.

=== 2018–present: Lonely ===
On January 10, 2018, Jo released the digital single 새벽 (Lonely), his first release after joining Cube Entertainment. Jo was set to enlist in the Korean Army in August 2018, for his mandatory military service. On July 24, 2019, it was confirmed that he would release a special single new theme song for the ROK Army with collaboration of Shinee's Onew and Key, Exo's Xiumin, Infinite's Kim Sung-kyu, BtoB's Lee Chang-sub, 2AM's Jinwoon, Yoon Ji-sung and actors Kim Minseok, and Lee Jae-kyoon in mid-August.

As part of South Korea's effort to combat COVID-19, Jo officially discharged from the military early on March 24, 2020. He also made his first variety show appearance after being discharged on JTBC's Knowing Bros alongside 2PM's Wooyoung, Block B's P.O & Winner's Mino on April 4, 2020. In July 2020, Jo Kwon starred in the musical Everybody's Talking About Jamie, playing the role of Jamie New, a 16-year-old high school student, who dreams to be a drag queen, and deals with prejudice and bullies.

On August 25, 2022, it was announced that Jo Kwon will be releasing "My Regards", a remake of the Ribbon Project in collaboration with Sunye, It will be released on August 28.

On 4 September 2026, he hosted Korea's Next Wave.

== Personal life ==
=== Education ===
As of 2013, Jo was attending Kyung Hee University. He entered Kyung Hee University without taking the entrance examination, with rumors alleging favouritism, because he was an entertainer. The rumors were refuted by his performance at the top of his class in his major. In 2015, he enrolled in the Performing Arts Department of Kyunghee University's Graduate Program.

=== Business venture ===
Jo is the president of the cereal cafe franchise Midnight in Seoul, which was founded and owned by actor-singer Yoon Kye-sang and three friends. The cafe-cereal-bar was the first of its kind in Seoul and gained popularity amongst K-pop idol singers through word-of-mouth. In May 2017, it was announced that the venture would become a franchise and that Jo would be named its president, while Yoon and others would remain official owners.

== Discography ==
=== Studio albums ===
| Title | Album details | Peak chart positions | Sales |
| Title | Album details | KOR | Sales |
|---|---|---|---|
| I'm Da One | Released: June 25, 2012; Label: JYP Entertainment, Big Hit Entertainment; Formats: CD, digital download; Track listing: 1. "Awesome Girl" (feat. Yankee); 2. "Animal" (Radio Edit) (feat. J-Hope of BTS)"; 3. "I'm Da One" (feat. Zion.T); 4. "Lipstick"; 5. "Who's Loving You Now"; 6. "Wingardium Leviosa"; 7. "Something 'Bout You" (feat. Jinwoon of 2AM); 8. "Heaven" (feat. Miso of GLAM); 9. "Just a Kiss"; 10. "Animal" (feat. J-Hope of BTS) | 1 | KOR: 17,547 |

=== Singles ===
| Title | Year | Peak chart positions | Sales | Album |
| Title | Year | KOR | Sales | Album |
As lead artist
| "The Day I Confessed" (고백하던 날) | 2010 | 3 | —N/a | Non-album single |
| "I'm Da One" feat. Zion.T | 2010 | 22 | —N/a | I'm Da One |
| "Crosswalk" (횡단보도) | 2016 | 15 | KOR: 88,076 | Non-album singles |
| "Lonely" (새벽) | 2018 | — | —N/a | Non-album singles |
| "Like I Do" | 2026 | — | —N/a | Non-album singles |
Collaborations
| "Graduation" (졸업) with Changmin | 2009 | —N/a | —N/a | Non-album singles |
| "Dunk Shoot" (덩크슛) with Whale | 2009 | —N/a | —N/a | Non-album singles |
| "I Happen to Love You" (우리 사랑하게 됐어요) with Gain | 2009 | 1 | KOR: 2,085,894 | Non-album singles |
| "Perfect Christmas" with Lim Jeong-hee, Joo Hee of 8Eight, RM & Jungkook of BTS | 2013 | 45 | KOR: 64,789 | Non-album singles |
| "On A Good Day Like This" (이렇게 좋은 날에) with Joo Yeong of Seorindong Children | 2015 | — | KOR: 14,251 | Non-album singles |
| "Born to Be Wild" with Hyoyeon and Min | 2016 | — | —N/a | SM Station Season 1 |
| "Upgrade" with Hyuna, BtoB, CLC, Pentagon, Yoo Seon-ho, (G)I-dle | 2018 | — | —N/a | 2018 United Cube: ONE |
| "First Page" (첫 페이지) with Sunye | 2020 | — (Note: "First Page" didn't enter Gaon Digital Chart, but peaked 200 position on the Gaon Download Chart) | —N/a | Non-album singles |
| "Greetings" (안부) with Sunye | 2022 | 139 | —N/a | Non-album singles |
"—" denotes release did not chart.

=== Soundtrack appearances ===
| Title | Year | Peak chart positions | Sales | Album |
| Title | Year | KOR | Sales | Album |
|---|---|---|---|---|
| "One Summer Night" with Fei | 2014 | 49 | KOR: 42,302 | Temptation OST |
| "Heaven" | 2015 | 44 | KOR: 78,644 | Two Yoo Project Sugar Man OST |
| "Rise and Fall" (흥망성쇠) with Yoo Se-yoon, Shim Hyung-tak, Choi Yoo-jung | 2017 | — | —N/a | Golden Tambourine OST |
| "Holding on to the End of Tonight" (이 밤의 끝을 잡고) | 2018 | — | —N/a | Immortal Songs: Singing the Legend (Composer Kim Hyeong-seok) |
| "Twist King" with Shin Joo-hyup & MJ (cast of Everybody's Talking About Jamie) | 2020 | — | —N/a | Immortal Songs: Singing the Legend (Kim Jong-guk x Turbo Part 1) |
| "I Happen to Love You (2025)" (우리 사랑하게 됐어요 (2025)) with Gain | 2025 | 162 | —N/a | Even If This Love Disappears Tonight OST |
"—" denotes release did not chart.

== Filmography ==
=== Music videos ===
| Year | Title |
|---|---|
| 2012 | "I'm Da One" |

=== Film ===
| Year | Title | Role |
|---|---|---|
| 2013 | Pinocchio | Pinocchio (Dubbing) |

=== Television series ===
| Year | Title | Role | Ref. |
|---|---|---|---|
| 2010 | All My Love for You | Hwang Ok-yub | |
| 2013 | The Dramatic "Flower Boys Corporation" | Jo Kwon | |
| 2013 | The Queen of Office | Kye Kyung-woo | |
| 2015 | The Producers | Himself (ep.3) | |
| 2015 | Drinking Solo | Kwon (fellow student at Noryangjin) (ep. 11) | |

=== Television shows ===
| Year | Title | Role | Notes | Ref. |
|---|---|---|---|---|
| 2009 | We Got Married | Himself | Season 2 (60 episodes) with Gain | |
| 2010 | Family Outing 2 | Member | Season 2 | |
| 2010 | Star King | Himself | Episodes 147–149, 152–158, 162, 177, 179, 184 | |
| 2013 | A Song For You | Host | Season 2 (16 episodes) | |
| 2015 | King of Mask Singer | Contestant | Episode 1 | |
| 2016 | Golden Tambourine | Host | Season 1 | |
| 2021 | Overseas Korean Song Festival | Judge | | |
| 2023 | Boys Planet | Star master | Episodes 10–11 | |
| 2023 | R U Next? | Coaches | | |
| 2026 | Korea's Next Wave | Host | | |

=== Web shows ===
| Year | Title | Role | Ref. |
|---|---|---|---|
| 2022 | Born This Way | Narrator | |

=== Hosting ===
| Year | Title | Notes | Ref. |
|---|---|---|---|
| 2010 | M Countdown | Rotating host; with Nichkhun, Lee Jun-ho, Hwang Chan-sung, Jeong Jin-woon, Kang Min-hyuk, Lee Joon, and G.O | |
| 2013 | MBC Korean Music Wave in Bangkok | with Nichkhun, Choi Min-ho, Park Ji-yeon, and Bae Suzy | |
| 2020 | (G)I-dle's I Trust media showcase | | |

== Musicals ==
| Year | Title | Role | Ref. |
|---|---|---|---|
| 2013 | Jesus Christ Superstar | King Herod | |
| 2014 | Priscilla, Queen of the Desert | Adam | |
| 2015 | Chess | Anatoly Sergievsky | |
| 2016 | On A Starry Night | Choi Sung Keun | |
| 2019 | Shinheung Military Academy | Paldo | |
| 2020 | Everybody's Talking About Jamie | Jamie New | |

== Ambassadorship ==
| Year | Title | Notes | Ref. |
|---|---|---|---|
| 2017 | Organization of Helping Children of Low Income Households | | |

== Awards and nominations ==
| Year | Award | Category | Nominated work | Result | Ref. |
|---|---|---|---|---|---|
| 2009 | Cyworld Digital Music Awards | Song of the Month (December) | "I Happen to Love You" (with Gain) | Won | |
| 2010 | Cyworld Digital Music Awards | Song of the Month (January) | "I Happen to Love You" (with Gain) | Won | |
| 2010 | Gaon Chart Grand Opening Awards | January Week 1 Digital Chart Overall #1 | "I Happen to Love You" (with Gain) | Won | |
| 2010 | Gaon Chart Grand Opening Awards | January Week 2 Digital Chart Overall #1 | "I Happen to Love You" (with Gain) | Won | |
| 2010 | Gaon Chart Grand Opening Awards | January Week 3 Digital Chart Overall #1 | "I Happen to Love You" (with Gain) | Won | |
| 2010 | Gaon Chart Grand Opening Awards | January Week 4 Ringback tone #1 | "I Happen to Love You" (with Gain) | Won | |
| 2010 | 4th Mnet 20's Choice Awards | Most Influential Top 20 Stars | Jo Kwon | Won | |
| 2010 | 3rd Korea Sharing Awards | The National Assembly standing Committee's Chairman Award | Jo Kwon | Won | |
| 2010 | Melon Music Awards | Song of the Year | "I Happen to Love You" (with Gain) | Nominated | |
| 2010 | Melon Music Awards | Netizen Popularity Song | "I Happen to Love You" (with Gain) | Nominated | |
| 2010 | 12th Mnet Asian Music Awards | Best Collaboration | "I Happen to Love You" (with Gain) | Won | |
| 2010 | Bugs Music Awards | Song of the Year | "I Happen to Love You" (with Gain) | Nominated | |
| 2010 | Bugs Music Awards | Best Duet (Gold) | "I Happen to Love You" (with Gain) | Won | |
| 2010 | Bugs Music Awards | Best Variety Star (Bronze) | We Got Married | Won | |
| 2010 | MBC Entertainment Awards | Show, Variety Male Rookie Award | We Got Married | Won | |
| 2010 | MBC Entertainment Awards | Best Couple Award with Ga-in | We Got Married | Won | |
| 2010 | SBS Entertainment Awards | New Star Award | Inkigayo | Won | |
| 2011 | MBC Entertainment Awards | Comedy / Sitcom Popularity Award | All My Love | Won | |
