= Stauroscope =

A stauroscope is an optical instrument used in determining the position of the planes of light-vibration in sections of crystals. The word comes from Greek for cross + scope. It was invented by Wolfgang Franz von Kobell in 1855.
