= Circle Chart =

South Korean music chart

- Website type: Record chart
- Available in: Korean
- Predecessors: Gaon Chart (2010–2022)
- Owner: Korea Music Content Association
- Website: circlechart.kr
- Commercial: Yes
- Registration: Optional
- Launched: February 23, 2010; 16 years ago
- Current status: Active

The Circle Chart (Korean: 써클차트; RR: Sseokeul-chateu), previously known as the Gaon Music Chart or the Gaon Chart (Korean: 가온차트; RR: Gaon-chateu), tabulates the relative weekly popularity of songs and albums in South Korea. Founded in 2010, it is produced by the Korea Music Content Association and sponsored by South Korea's Ministry of Culture, Sports and Tourism.

== History ==
Gaon logo

Gaon Chart was launched in February 2010 by the Korea Music Content Association, under the sponsorship of the South Korean Ministry of Culture, Sports and Tourism, with the aim to create a domestic national chart similar to the Billboard charts of the United States and the Oricon charts of Japan. The word gaon, which means 'middle' or 'center' in Korean, was chosen to represent fairness and reliability. The chart started tracking sales from the beginning of that year. A small awards ceremony was held in conjunction with the launch ceremony on February 23, at the Westin Chosun hotel in Seoul. Girl group Girls' Generation was awarded the Top Artist of January, boy band Super Junior won Best Album of 2009, and Jo Kwon and Ga-in's "I Happen to Love You" won Best Weekly Mobile Ringtone.

In February 2011, Gaon published online and offline album sales information for 2010, including a detailed breakdown of online chart data. This was the first time that offline album sales had been released since 2008 when the Music Industry Association of Korea stopped compiling data.

On July 7, 2022, the Gaon Chart was rebranded as Circle Chart. A new Global K-pop Chart was introduced alongside the retention of existing charts. The Gaon Chart Music Awards were also rebranded to the Circle Chart Awards.

== Music charts ==
=== Song charts ===
Chart title	Chart type	Number of positions	Ranking methodology
Global K-pop Chart	streaming	200	Worldwide K-pop streaming usage
Digital Chart	streaming + download + background music + V Coloring sales	200	South Korea standard song popularity chart
Streaming Chart	streaming	200	Streaming usage volume in South Korea; One of four component charts of the Digital Chart
Download Chart	download	200	Download sales volume in South Korea; One of four component charts of the Digital Chart
BGM Chart	background music	200	Background music sales volume in South Korea; One of four component charts of the Digital Chart
V Coloring Chart	video ringback tones	100	V Coloring app usage volume in South Korea; One of four component charts of the Digital Chart

=== Album charts ===
Chart title	Number of positions	Ranking methodology
Album Chart	100	Album distribution volume (tape, LP, CD, USB, KiT, platform album, etc.)
Retail Album Chart	50	Total sales of offline albums at retail stores (tape, LP, CD, USB, KiT, platform album, etc.)

=== Other music charts ===
Chart title	Number of positions	Ranking methodology
Singing Room Chart	200	Number of times song played in noraebang
Bell Chart	100	Ranking of ringtones of South Korea mobile carriers
Ring Chart	100	Ranking of ringtones of South Korea mobile carriers

== Social charts ==
The Circle Social Chart is a weekly chart that ranks the top 50 most popular K-pop artists using data from YouTube, Mubeat, Higher, and Keytalk AI.

The Gaon Weibo Chart was a weekly chart that ranked the top 10 most popular K-pop groups and the top 30 most popular individual K-pop artists in China using data from Weibo.

== Certification ==
In April 2018, the Korea Music Content Association introduced music recording certifications for albums, downloads and streaming. Album certifications are awarded based on shipment figures provided by record labels and distributors. Download and streaming certifications are awarded to songs based on online data provided by web-based music providers. Albums and songs released on or after January 1, 2018, are eligible for certification.

=== Album ===
Thresholds per award
Platinum	2× Platinum	3× Platinum	Million	2× Million (Note: Higher certifications (such as 3× Million) will also be awarded.)
250,000	500,000	750,000	1,000,000	2,000,000

=== Download ===
Thresholds per award
Platinum	2× Platinum	3× Platinum	Diamond
2,500,000	5,000,000	7,500,000	10,000,000

=== Streaming ===
Thresholds per award
Platinum	2× Platinum	3× Platinum (Note: Higher certifications (up to 9× Platinum) will also be awarded.)	Billion
100,000,000	200,000,000	300,000,000	1,000,000,000

== Awards ==
- Circle Chart Music Awards
