= List of K-pop artists =

The following is a list of notable individual K-pop artists.

== Male ==
=== A ===
- Yuto Adachi
- Danny Ahn
- Tony An
- Ajoo
- Aoora
- Aron

=== B ===
- B-Bomb
- B.I
- Babylon
- Bae Jin-young
- Bae Ki-sung
- Baekho
- Baekhyun
- BamBam
- Bang Chan
- Bang Ye-dam
- Bang Yong-guk
- Baro
- Beomgyu
- BM
- Bobby
- Boi B
- Bong Jae-hyun
- Bumkey
- Bumzu
- Byung Hun

=== C ===
- Marcus Cabais
- Cha Eun-woo
- Cha Hun
- Cha In-ha
- Chae Bo-hun
- Chancellor
- Jay Chang
- Changbin
- Changjo
- Max Changmin
- Chanyeol
- Chen
- Chenle
- Cho Kyu-hyun
- Andrew Choi
- Choi Bo-min
- Choi Byung-chan
- Choi Hyun-suk
- Choi Jong-hoon
- Choi Jung-won
- Choi Min-ho
- Choi Min-hwan
- Choi Si-won
- Choi Sung-min
- Choi Young-jae
- Choiza
- Alex Chu
- Chuei Liyu
- Chun Myung-hoon
- CNU
- Cream
- Crush

=== D ===
- Daesung
- Dawn
- Dino
- DJ Clazzi
- DJ Shine
- DK
- Do Han-se
- Doh Kyung-soo
- Dongpyo
- Dowoon
- Doyoung
- DPR Ian

=== E ===
- Eru
- Eun Ji-won
- Eunhyuk

=== F ===
- Felix

=== G ===
- G-Dragon
- G.O
- G.Soul
- Gaeko
- Gaho
- Gary
- Gill
- Giuk
- Gong Myung
- Gongchan

=== H ===
- H-Eugene
- Ha Dong-kyun
- Ha Hyun-sang
- Ha Sebin
- Ha Sung-woon
- Haechan
- Han
- Han Geng
- Han Hee-jun
- Han Seung-woo
- Hanbin
- Hangzoo
- Hanhae
- Heo Jung-min
- Heo Young-saeng
- Hongjoong
- Hongseok
- Hoshi
- Hoya
- Justin Huang
- Huang Zitao
- HueningKai
- Huh Gak
- Hui
- Hur Hyun-jun
- Hwang Chan-sung
- Hwang Chi-yeul
- Hwang Kwang-hee
- Hwang Min-hyun
- Hwanhee
- Hyuk
- Hyun Jin-young
- Hyungwon
- Hyunjin

=== I ===
- I'll
- I.M
- I.N
- Im Hyun-sik
- Yim Si-wan

=== J ===
- J-Hope
- Jaehyun
- Jaemin
- Jang Beom-june
- Jang Dae-hyeon
- Jang Dong-woo
- Jang Han-byul
- Jang Hyun-seung
- Jang Jin-young
- Jang Minho
- Jang Su-won
- Jang Woo-hyuk
- Jang Wooyoung
- Jay
- Jay B
- Jeno
- Jeong Jin-hwan
- Jeong Jin-woon
- Jeong Se-woon
- Jeong Yun-ho
- Jeonghan
- Jero
- Jihoon
- Jimin
- Jin
- Jin Longguo
- Jinho
- Jinjin
- Jinu
- Jinyoung
- Jisung
- Jo Kwang-min
- Jo Kwon
- Jo Woo-chan
- Jo Young-min
- Jongho
- Jonghyun
- Jonghyeong
- Brian Joo
- Joo Jong-hyuk
- Joohoney
- Joshua
- Jun
- Jun Jin
- Jun. K
- Jun.Q
- Jung Chan-woo
- Jung Dae-hyun
- Jung Il-hoon
- Jung Jin-young
- Jung Joon-young
- Jung Kook
- Jung Seung-hwan
- Jung Yong-hwa
- Jung Yoon-hak
- Junggigo
- Jungwoo
- Jungyup

=== K ===
- K.Will
- Kai
- Kang Chan-hee
- Kang Daniel
- Kang Doo
- Kang In-soo
- Kang Kyun-sung
- Kang Min-hyuk
- Kang Seung-yoon
- Kang Sung-hoon
- Kang Tae-oh
- Kang Yu-chan
- Kangin
- Kangnam
- Kangta
- Kanto
- Kasper
- Kebee
- Ken
- Key
- Kidoh
- Kiggen
- Kihyun
- Allen Kim
- Kim C
- Kim Dong-han
- Kim Dong-hyun
- Kim Dong-hyun
- Kim Dong-jun
- Kim Dong-wan
- Eddy Kim
- Eli Kim
- Kim Feel
- Kim Hee-chul
- Kim Hyun-joong
- Kim Hyung-jun
- Kim Jae-duck
- Kim Jae-hwan
- Kim Jae-hyun
- Kim Jae-joong
- Kim Jae-yong
- Kim Jeong-hoon
- Kim Ji-hoon
- Kim Ji-hoon
- Kim Ji-soo
- Kim Ji-woong
- Kim Jin-ho
- Kim Jin-woo
- Kim Jong-hyeon
- Kim Jong-kook
- Kim Jong-min
- Kim Joon
- Kim Jung-mo
- Kim Jung-woo
- Kim Junsu
- Kim Ki-bum
- Kim Kyu-jong
- Kim Min-kyu
- Roy Kim
- Kim Ryeo-wook
- Sam Kim
- Kim Se-yong
- Kim Sun-woong
- Kim Sung-jae
- Kim Sung-joo
- Kim Sung-kyu
- Kim Tae-woo
- Kim Woo-seok
- Kim Woo-sung
- Kim Woojin
- Kim Yo-han
- Kim Yong-jun
- Kino
- Ko Ji-yong
- Koo Jun-hoe
- Koo Jun-yup
- Kwak Jin-eon
- Kwon Hyun-bin
- Kyoungyoon

=== L ===
- L
- Lai Kuan-lin
- Lana
- Henry Lau
- Alexander Lee
- Andy Lee
- Lee Chan-hyuk
- Lee Chang-min
- Lee Chang-sub
- Lee Dae-hwi
- Lee Donghae
- Lee Eugene
- Lee Eun-sang
- Lee Gi-kwang
- Lee Gun-woo
- Lee Hong-bin
- Lee Hong-gi
- Lee Hyun
- Lee Hyun-jae
- Lee Jae-hoon
- Lee Jae-jin
- Lee Jae-won
- Lee Jae-yoon
- Lee Jai-jin
- Lee Jin-hyuk
- Lee Jong-hwa
- Lee Jong-hyun
- Lee Joon
- Lee Jun-ho
- Lee Jun-young
- Lee Jung
- Lee Jung-shin
- Lee Ki-seop
- Lee Know
- Lee Min-hyuk
- Lee Min-hyuk
- Lee Min-woo
- Lee Sang-min
- Lee Seok-hoon
- Lee Seong-jong
- Lee Seung-gi
- Lee Seung-hoon
- Lee Seung-hyub
- Lee Sung-min
- Lee Sung-yeol
- Lee Tae-hwan
- Lee Tae-vin
- Lee You-jin
- Leeteuk
- Leo
- Le'v
- Li Wenhan
- Lil Boi
- Lim Seul-ong
- Louie
- Lu Han
- Lucas

=== M ===
- Mark
- Mikey
- Min Kyung-hoon
- Mingyu
- Mino
- Minos
- Mir
- Mithra Jin
- MJ
- Moonbin
- Moon Hee-joon
- Moon Ji-hoo
- Moon Jong-up
- Moon Joon-young
- Eric Mun

=== N ===
- N
- Eric Nam
- Nam Tae-hyun
- Nam Woo-hyun
- Naul
- Nichkhun
- Niel
- No Min-woo

=== O ===
- David Oh
- Oh Jong-hyuk
- Kevin Oh
- Ok Taec-yeon
- One
- Onew
- Ong Seong-wu

=== P ===
- P.O
- Parc Jae-jung
- Bernard Park
- Park Geon-il
- Park Hyung-sik
- J.Y. Park
- Jae Park
- Park Jae-chan
- Jay Park
- Park Ji-hoon
- John Park
- Joon Park
- Park Jung-min
- Park Kyung
- Park Seo-ham
- Park Si-hwan
- Park Sun-ho
- Teddy Park
- Park Woo-jin
- Park Yong-ha
- Park Yoo-chun
- Psy

=== Q ===
- Qin Fen

=== R ===
- Rain
- Ravi
- Ren
- RM
- Rocky
- Roh Ji-hoon
- Roh Tae-hyun
- Rowoon

=== S ===
- S.Coups
- Samuel
- San
- San E
- Sanchez
- Sandeul
- Sehun
- Seo Eun-kwang
- Seo In-guk
- Seo Kang-joon
- Seo Min-woo
- Seo Taiji
- Seunghan
- Seungkwan
- Seungmin
- Seungri
- Seven
- Shin Dong-ho
- Shin Hye-sung
- Shin Jung-hwan
- Peniel Shin
- Shin Seung-hun
- Shin Won-ho
- Shindong
- Shotaro
- Shownu
- Sleepy
- Son Dong-woon
- Son Ho-jun
- Son Ho-young
- Son Woo-hyeon
- Song Seung-hyun
- Song Yuvin
- Soobin
- Suga
- Suho
- Sung Han-bin
- Sung Hoon
- Sungchan
- Sunghoon
- Sungjin
- Swings

=== T ===
- T.O.P
- Tablo
- Taebin
- Taehyun
- Taeil
- Taemin
- Taeyang
- Taeyong
- Tarzzan
- Teddy Park
- Ten
- Takuya Terada
- The8
- Thunder
- Tiger JK
- Mark Tuan

=== U ===
- U-Kwon

=== V ===
- V
- Vernon

=== W ===
- Jackson Wang
- Wang Yibo
- Yongsin Wongpanitnont
- Wonho
- Wonpil
- Wonwoo
- Woo Jin-young
- Kevin Woo
- Woody
- Woodz
- Wooseok
- Woozi
- Kris Wu
- Wuno

=== X ===
- Xiaojun
- Xiumin

=== Y ===
- Yang Hyun-suk
- Yang Seung-ho
- Yang Yo-seob
- Yeo Hoon-min
- Yeo One
- Yeonjun
- Yesung
- Yong Jun-hyung
- Yoo Hee-jae
- Yoo Hwe-seung
- Yoo Il
- Yoo Jae-suk
- Yoo Seon-ho
- Yoo Seung-jun
- Yoo Seung-woo
- Yoo Young-jae
- Yook Sung-jae
- Yoon Do-hyun
- Yoon Doo-joon
- Yoon Hyun-sang
- Yoon Ji-sung
- Yoon Jong-shin
- Yoon Kye-sang
- Yoon Min-soo
- Yoon San-ha
- Young K
- Youngjun
- Yugyeom
- Yunho
- Yuta

=== Z ===
- Zelo
- Zhang Hao
- Lay Zhang
- Zhou Mi
- Zhou Yixuan
- Zhu Zhengting
- Zick Jasper
- Zico

== Female ==
=== A ===
- Ah Young
- Ahn Ji-young
- Ahn So-hee
- Ahn Sol-bin
- Ailee
- AleXa
- Ali
- An Ye-seul
- An Yu-jin
- Anda
- Annie Moon
- Arin

=== B ===
- Bada
- Bae Seul-ki
- Shannon Bae
- Bae Suzy
- Bae Woo-hee
- Baek A-yeon
- Baek Ji-young
- Yerin Baek
- Bang Min-ah
- Belle
- Ben
- Bibi
- BoA
- Bona
- Bora
- Byul

=== C ===
- Cao Lu
- Chae Jung-an
- Chae Ri-na
- Chaeryeong
- Chae Yeon
- Chaeyoung
- Chanty
- Cheng Xiao
- Cho Seung-hee
- Choerry
- Choi Han-bit
- Choi Jung-in
- Choi Soo-eun
- Choi Soo-young
- Choi Ye-na
- Choi Yoo-jung
- Choi Yu-jin
- Choi Yu-ju
- Elkie Chong
- Kriesha Chu
- Chu Ye-jin
- Chung Ha
- Chuu
- CL

=== D ===
- Dahyun
- Dana
- Dawon
- Dayoung
- Dia

=== E ===
- Elly
- Esna
- Eugene
- Eunha
- Exy

=== F ===
- Fat Cat
- Fei

=== G ===
- G.NA
- Gaeul
- Gain
- Gil Hak-mi
- Gilme
- Giselle
- Go Woo-ri
- Goo Hara
- Ella Gross
- Gummy
- Gyubin

=== H ===
- Ha Soo-bin
- Haerin
- Haewon
- Hahm Eun-jung
- Han Chae-young
- Han Hye-ri
- Han Seung-yeon
- Han Sun-hwa
- Hani
- Hanni
- Harisu
- Rena Hasegawa
- Haseul
- Heejin
- Heize
- Heo Ga-yoon
- Heo Sol-ji
- Momo Hirai
- Hitomi Honda
- Hong Eunchae
- Hong Jin-kyung
- Hong Jin-young
- Horan
- Huh Chan-mi
- Huh Ji-won
- Huh Yunjin
- Hur Young-ji
- Hwangbo
- Hwang In-sun
- Hwang Jung-eum
- Hwasa
- Hwayobi
- Hyein
- Hyeju
- Hynn
- Hyojung
- Hyolyn
- Hyomin
- Hyoyeon
- Hyuna
- Hyunjin

=== I ===
- I
- Im Do-hwa
- Irene
- IU
- Ivy

=== J ===
- J
- Jamie
- Jang Gyu-ri
- Jang Jae-in
- Jang Na-ra
- Stella Jang
- Jang Won-young
- Jang Ye-eun
- JeA
- Jennie
- Jeon Boram
- Jeon Hye-bin
- Jeon Ji-yoon
- Jeon Somi
- Jeong So-yeon
- Jeongyeon
- Jessi
- Jia
- Jihyo
- Jini
- Jinsoul
- Jisoo
- Jiyul
- Jo Eun-byul
- Jo Yuri
- Joo
- JooE
- Joy
- Jun Hyo-seong
- Jung Chae-yeon
- Jung Da-eun
- Jung Eun-ji
- Jung Ha-na
- Jessica Jung
- Jung Ji-so
- Krystal Jung
- Nicole Jung
- Jung Ryeo-won
- Juniel

=== K ===
- Kahi
- Kan Mi-youn
- Kang Hye-won
- Kang Ji-young
- Kang Mi-na
- Kang Min-hee
- Kang Min-kyung
- Kang Se-jung
- Kang Si-ra
- Kang Ye-seo
- Kang Ye-won
- Karina
- Katie
- Kazuha
- Yūka Kato
- Kei
- Ki Hui-hyeon
- Kim Ah-joong
- Kim Bo-hyung
- Kim Chae-yeon
- Kim Chaewon
- Kim Da-som
- Kim Do-ah
- Kim Do-yeon
- Kim E-Z
- Euna Kim
- Kim Ga-young
- Kim Greem
- Kim Isak
- Kim Jae-kyung
- Kim Ji-hyun
- Kim Ji-sook
- Kim Jung-ah
- Kim Lip
- Kim Min-ju
- Kim Min-seo
- Kim Na-young
- Kim Nam-joo
- Kim Se-jeong
- Kim Seol-hyun
- Kim Si-hyeon
- Kim So-hee
- Kim So-hee
- Kim So-hye
- Kim So-jung
- Kim So-won
- Kim Sook
- Soy Kim
- Stephanie Kim
- Kim Wan-sun
- Kim Ye-won
- Kim Yeon-ji
- Kim Yoo-yeon
- Kim Yoon-ji
- Kim Yu-bin
- Kim Yuna
- Kisum
- Mako Kojima
- Reina Kubo
- Kwon Chae-won
- Kwon Eun-bi
- Kwon Eun-bin
- Kwon Jin-ah
- Kwon Mina
- Kwon Nara
- Kwon Ri-se
- Kwon So-hyun
- Kwon Yu-ri

=== L ===
- Lee Ahyumi
- Lee Bo-ram
- Cheris Lee
- Lee Chae-yeon
- Lee Hae-in
- Lee Hae-in
- Lee Hae-na
- Lee Hae-ri
- Lee Hee-jin
- Lee Hi
- Lee Hwa-kyum
- Lee Hye-ri
- Lee Hyori
- Lee Hyun-joo
- Lee Ji-hye
- Lee Ji-hyun
- Lee Ji-woo
- Lee Jin
- Lee Jin-ah
- Lee Joo-yeon
- Lee Ju-eun
- Lee Jung-hyun
- Lee Lu-da
- Michelle Lee
- Lee Na-eun
- Lee Si-a
- Lee So-jung
- Lee Soo-jung
- Lee Soo-mi
- Lee Soo-min
- Lee Soo-young
- Lee Su-hyun
- Lee Su-jeong
- Lee Su-ji
- Lee Sun-bin
- Lee Young-ji
- Lee Young-yoo
- Lee Yu-ri
- Leeseo
- Lexy
- Lia
- Lily
- Lim Jeong-hee
- Lim Kim
- Lim Na-young
- Lim Yoona
- Lina
- Lisa
- Amber Liu
- Lexie Liu
- Liu Xiening
- Liz
- Tasha Low
- Luna
- Lyn

=== M ===
- Nina Makino
- Danielle Marsh
- Jurina Matsui
- Meng Meiqi
- Mijoo
- Yua Mikami
- Min
- Min Do-hee
- Min Hae-kyung
- Min Hyo-rin
- Mina
- Minji
- Minnie
- Mint
- Minzy
- Mirani
- Miryo
- Sakura Miyawaki
- Miho Miyazaki
- Miyeon
- Moonbyul
- Sae Murase
- Tomu Muto

=== N ===
- Na Hae-ryung
- Nada
- Nam Gyu-ri
- Nam Ji-hyun
- Nam Yu-jin
- Nana
- Nancy
- Narsha
- Natty
- Nayeon
- NC.A
- Ningning

=== O ===
- Ock Joo-hyun
- Oh Ha-young
- Oh Seung-ah
- Oh Yeon-seo

=== P ===
- Park Bo-ram
- Park Bom
- Park Cho-a
- Park Cho-rong
- Park Gyeong-ree
- Park Gyu-ri
- Park Hee-von
- Park Hye-su
- Park Jeong-hwa
- Park Ji-yeon
- Park Ji-yoon
- Park Jin-joo
- Park Jung-ah
- Lena Park
- Sandara Park
- Park Si-eun
- Park So-jin
- Park So-yeon
- Park Soo-jin
- Park Soo-young
- Park Subin
- Park Ye-eun
- Park Yoon-ha
- Pearl

=== Q ===
- Qri

=== R ===
- Ra Mi-ran
- Raina
- Rei
- Alexandra Reid
- Rosé
- Rothy
- Rumble Fish
- Ryu Hwa-young
- Ryu Hyo-young
- Ryu Se-ra
- Ryu Su-jeong
- Ryujin

=== S ===
- Sakamoto Mashiro
- Fatou Samba
- Sana
- Seo Da-hyun
- Seo Hye-lin
- Seo Hyun-jin
- Seo In-young
- Seo Ji-young
- Seohyun
- Seola
- Seulgi
- Seunghee
- Shannon
- Shen Xiaoting
- Shim Eun-jin
- Shim Mina
- Shin Hye-jeong
- Shin Jee-won
- Shin Ji
- Shin Ji-hoon
- Shin Ji-min
- Shin Yeon-suh
- Miru Shiroma
- Shoo
- Shuhua
- SinB
- Bailey Sok
- Solar
- Solbi
- Somin
- Son Dam-bi
- Son Na-eun
- Son Seung-yeon
- Song Ji-eun
- Victoria Song
- Sonim
- Soojin
- Sori
- Sorn
- Soya
- Soyeon
- Soyou
- Sulli
- Sullyoon
- Sunday
- Sung Yu-ri
- Sunmi
- Sunny
- Sunye
- Swan

=== T ===
- Taeyeon
- Juri Takahashi
- Miyu Takeuchi
- Anna Tanaka
- Yukika Teramoto
- Tiffany Young
- Tzuyu

=== U ===
- U Sung-eun
- U;Nee
- Uee
- Uhm Jung-hwa
- Umji

=== V ===
- Viki

=== W ===
- Wax
- Wendy
- Wheein
- Winter
- Ferlyn Wong
- Wonhee
- Woo Hye-mi
- Woo Hye-rim
- Wooyeon
- Wu Xuanyi

=== X ===
- Xiyeon
- Xu Ziyin

=== Y ===
- Y:SY
- Nako Yabuki
- Yang Ji-won
- Yang Yeon-je
- Yang Yoo-jin
- Yebin
- Yeji
- Yeojin
- Yeonwoo
- Yeri
- Yerin
- Yezi
- Yoo Ara
- Yoo Chae-yeong
- Yoo So-young
- Yoo Yeon-jung
- YooA
- Yoon Bo-mi
- Yoon Bo-ra
- Yoon Chae-kyung
- Yoon Eun-hye
- Yoon Mi-rae
- Yoon Seo-yeon
- Youngseo
- Yuju
- Yuna (singer, born 1992)
- Yuna (singer, born 2003)
- Yuqi
- Yura
- Yuri
- Yves

=== Z ===
- Z.Hera
- Zhang Bichen
- Zhang Liyin
- Zhou Jieqiong
- Zia
- Zzone

== See also ==
- For the list of idol bands, see List of South Korean idol groups.
- For the list of girl groups, see List of South Korean girl groups.
- For the list of boy groups, see List of South Korean boy groups.
