= All the K-pop =

- Genre: Variety
- Country of origin: South Korea
- Original language: Korean

Original release
- Network: MBC Music
- Release: 8 August 2012 – 13 August 2013

All the K-Pop (Korean: 올 더 케이팝) was a South Korean variety show, which aired Tuesday nights on the MBC Music channel. The show was hosted by Boom, Park Jae-min and MBLAQ's Mir.

Episodes 23 and 25 were the two most-viewed Korean videos (not counting music videos and music shows) on YouTube in 2013, and episode 26 ranked eighth. These three videos had 6.7 million views at the end of the year, with about 80 percent them from other countries.

As of 2024, the brand "ALL THE K-POP" is used to promote two other music programs of MBC, Show Champion and Weekly Idol.

== Hosts ==
- Boom
- Park Jae-min
- Mir (MBLAQ)

=== Guest MCs ===
- Seungho (MBLAQ)
- Min (Miss A)

== List of episodes ==
Episode	Air Date	Guests
1	8 August 2012	Sistar
2	15 August 2012	Sistar
3	24 August 2012	MBLAQ, Jisoo (TAHITI)
4	31 August 2012	MBLAQ, Jisoo (TAHITI)
5	7 September 2012	BEAST, Tia (Chocolat)
6	14 September 2012	BEAST, Tia (Chocolat)
7	21 September 2012	KARA, VIXX (N, Hongbin)
8	28 September 2012	KARA, VIXX (N, Hongbin)
9	5 October 2012	Secret, Park Tae-yang (ChAOS), Yoo Hyung-doo
10	12 October 2012	Secret, Park Tae-yang (ChAOS), Yoo Hyung-doo
11	19 October 2012	
12	26 October 2012	Super Junior (Leeteuk, Shindong), Jisoo (TAHITI), Surin (Two X)
13	2 November 2012	Super Junior (Leeteuk, Shindong), Jisoo (TAHITI), Surin (Two X)
14	9 November 2012	Miss A, 24K (Sungoh, Daeil)
15	16 November 2012	Miss A, 24K (Sungoh, Daeil)
16	23 November 2012	F.T. Island, Crayon Pop (Ellin, Way)
17	30 November 2012	F.T. Island, Crayon Pop (Ellin, Way)
18	14 December 2012	
Special	28 December 2012	World-class Awesome Rookie Awards (WARA)
Special	4 January 2013	World-class Awesome Rookie Awards (WARA)
19	22 January 2013	
Special	5 February 2013	Behind the Scene on All the K-pop
20	12 February 2013	Special New Lunar Year
21	19 February 2013	Special New Lunar Year
22	26 February 2013	Behind the Scene of WARA; Special guest: SPICA
23	5 March 2013	Seungho (MBLAQ), VIXX (N, Ken, Hongbin), Myname (Insoo, Seyong), Ellin (Crayon Pop), Jisoo (TAHITI), Zinni (GLAM), Kyungri (Nine Muses), Eun-young (Two X)
24	12 March 2013	Seungho (MBLAQ), VIXX (N, Ken, Hongbin), Myname (Insoo, Seyong), Ellin (Crayon Pop), Jisoo (TAHITI), Zinni (GLAM), Kyungri (Nine Muses), Eun-young (Two X)
25	19 March 2013	100% (Minwoo, Sanghoon, Rockhyun), Kang Jun (C-Clown), Insoo (Myname), Zinni (GLAM), Ellin (Crayon Pop), Jisoo (TAHITI), Yang Jiwon (SPICA), Tasha (Skarf)
26	26 March 2013	100% (Minwoo, Sanghoon, Rockhyun), Kang Jun (C-Clown), Insoo (Myname), Zinni (GLAM), Ellin (Crayon Pop), Jisoo (TAHITI), Yang Jiwon (SPICA), Tasha (Skarf)
27	2 April 2013	B1A4, Min (Miss A)
28	9 April 2013	B1A4, Min (Miss A)
29	16 April 2013	Bada, Seungho (MBLAQ), Myname (Insoo, Seyong)
30	23 April 2013	Bada, Seungho (MBLAQ), Myname (Insoo, Seyong)
31	30 April 2013	Highlights of All the K-pop
32	7 May 2013	ZE:A FIVE, Saem (Rania), Hani (EXID)
33	14 May 2013	ZE:A FIVE (except Siwan), Eunji (GI), Hani (EXID)
34	21 May 2013	Seungho (MBLAQ), VIXX (N, Ken, Hongbin), Taewoon (SPEED), Kevin (ZE:A FIVE), Ellin (Crayon Pop), Hani (EXID), Zinni (GLAM), Kyungri (Nine Muses), Cao Lu (Fiestar)
35	28 May 2013	Seungho (MBLAQ), VIXX (N, Ken, Hongbin), Taewoon (SPEED), Kevin (ZE:A FIVE), Ellin (Crayon Pop), Hani (EXID), Zinni (GLAM), Kyungri (Nine Muses), Cao Lu (Fiestar)
36	9 July 2013	Special Summer Vacation: Miss A (Fei, Min), NS Yoon-G, Hello Venus (Nara, Yooara), Park Eun-ji, Ahn Jae-hyun, Ahn Hyung-joon, Oh Hyun-woong, Lee Hyun-jae, Insoo (Myname), Sungjun (Boys Republic)
37	16 July 2013	Special Summer Vacation: Miss A (Fei, Min), NS Yoon-G, Hello Venus (Nara, Yooara), Park Eun-ji, Ahn Jae-hyun, Ahn Hyung-joon, Oh Hyun-woong, Lee Hyun-jae, Insoo (Myname), Sungjun (Boys Republic)
37	16 July 2013	MBLAQ
38	23 July 2013	MBLAQ
39	30 July 2013	Special Summer Idol Dignity: History, 100%, Boys Republic, GI, SPEED, Z.Hera
40	6 August 2013	VIXX
41	13 August 2013	Special Summer Idol Dignity: History, 100%, GI, SPEED, Z.Hera, Sunny Hill, Jewelry, Dal Shabet, MR.MR, 2Eyes
