= Myname =

South Korean boy band

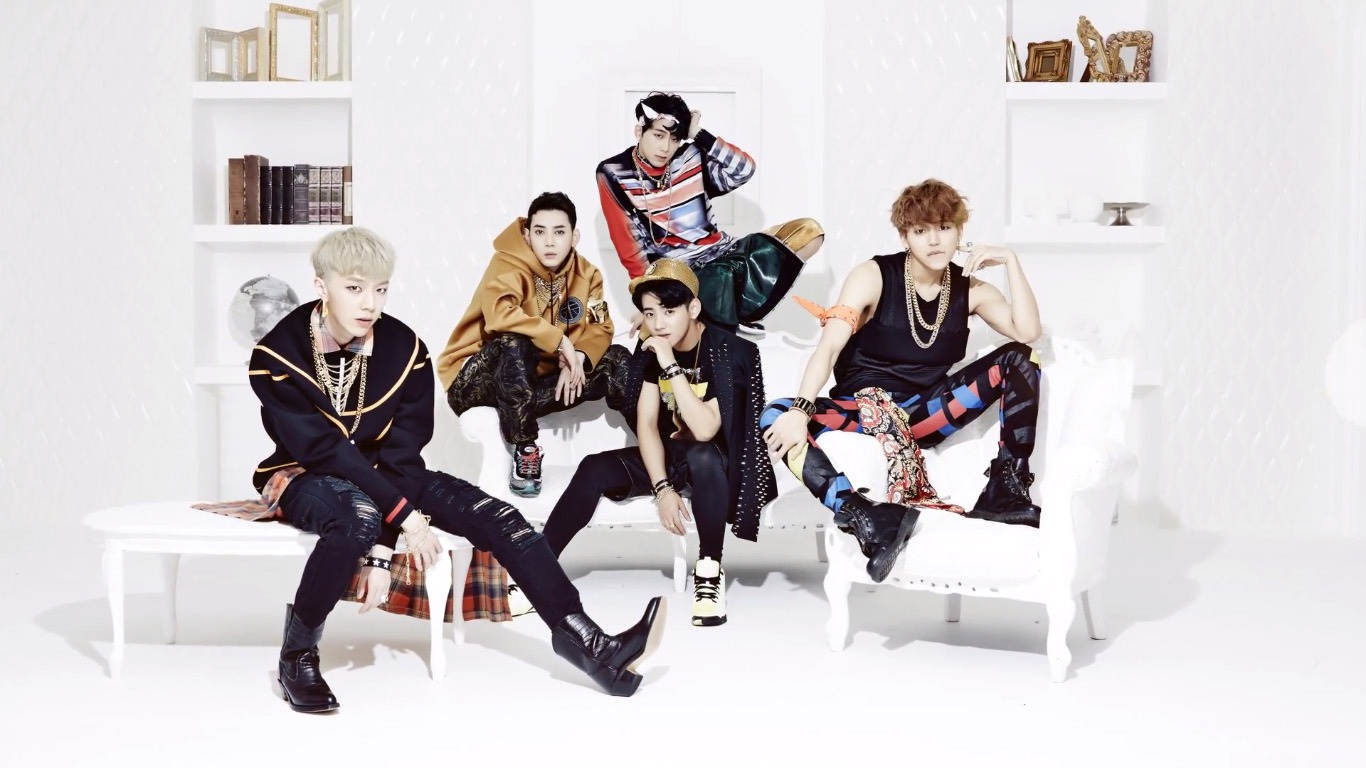
- Myname in 2015

Background information
- Origin: South Korea
- Genres: K-pop; J-pop
- Years active: 2011–2019; 2025–present
- Labels: H2 Media; YM3D; Universal Music Japan
- Members: Gunwoo; Insoo; Seyong; Jun.Q; Chaejin
- Website: www.myname-jp.com

Myname (Korean: 마이네임; stylized as MYNAME) is a South Korean boy group created by Fly to the Sky's Hwanhee under H2 Media. The group is composed of five members: Gunwoo, Insoo, Seyong, Jun.Q, and Chaejin. The group debuted on October 27, 2011 with their digital single "Message".

== History ==
=== Pre-debut ===
While in middle school, Seyong was recruited as a trainee under JYP Entertainment in 2007, where he trained for three years. He left the company due to "personal issues" and later joined his current agency. Seyong then went on to star in the KBS drama I Believe in Love. Insoo auditioned for Superstar K2 in 2010. The show featured his studies as a dance major in university as well as a visit from his high school friend, MBLAQ leader Seungho, who gave him advice and encouragement before his audition.

=== 2011–2012: Debut ===
On July 30, 2011, Fly to the Sky's Hwanhee announced that he would be debuting a five-member boy group known as "Hwanhee Boys" sometime in September or October of that year after he trained them for two years. Five members were introduced: Seyong, Insoo, Jun.Q, Gunwoo and Chaejin and they would debut as Myname.

Myname appeared in reality show SBS MTV's Ta-Dah It's Myname. The pilot episode aired on October 25, 2011 and the program began airing regularly on November 5. On October 27, Myname made their official debut stage on the music program M Countdown. Their debut single, "Message", was digitally released on October 28.

Myname made a cameo appearance on the KBS drama Dream High 2 in January 2012.

Myname released their first single album with the lead song "Hello & Goodbye" on June 1, 2012. Myname participated in reality show SBS MTV's Diary, which premiered on June 25, 2012.

Myname officially debuted in Japan on July 25, 2012 with their first Japanese single "Message (Japanese ver.)". Their debut showcase was held at Tokyo's Shibuya-AX with 2,000 fans in attendance. After its release, the single ranked No. 1 on the Tokyo Shibuya Tower record sales and charted No. 9 on the Oricon Chart.

In August, the group became the first male models for the Japanese swimwear brand San-ai.

On November 21, Myname released their second Japanese single "What's Up". Myname held a release event at LaQua in Tokyo Dome City three days after the single's release. The event drew in 1,500 attendees. The group held their first solo concert, Myname 1st Live "What's Up", on December 15 at Zepp Namba and on December 17 at Zepp Tokyo. The concert drew in 5,000 fans.

=== 2013: First mini album and We Are Myname ===
On January 7, 2013, Myname W Kitchen was premiered on Tokyo MX, a cooking show to introduce Korean food for Japanese audiences. The show featured AKB48’s Mariya Nagao as a co-host.

After being pushed back from an October 2012 release, their second single album was officially released on January 25, 2013 with the title track "Just That Little Thing". The group successfully held their first solo Korean concert, The Beginning, on March 3, 2013 at the Interpark Art Center in Seoul.

On March 28, Myname released first Japanese album, We Are Myname with the title track "We Are the Night". The album was ranked 3rd on the Oricon Daily Weekly Chart and ranked 1st on the Tower Records Daily Chart. Myname held their first Japan tour, Myname Live Tour ～ The Departure, in Osaka, Nagoya and Tokyo on May 18, 19 and 25, 2013 respectively.

Myname's first mini album was digitally released on July 4 with title track "Baby I'm Sorry". The music video had an age restriction placed due to violence. The mini album was physically released on July 9 and later topped both the Hanteo and Gaon charts, ranking #1 with the initial printing of 20,000 units selling out and another 20,000 copies also selling quickly. Making their first performance on KBS' Music Bank on July 19, 2013, "Baby I'm Sorry" debuted at #5, the group's highest ever position on the countdown.

On September 12, they made a guest appearance on Episode 8 of the Tooniverse mystery/children's series Thunderstruck Stationery.

Their third single album with title track "Day by Day" was released digitally on October 11 and physically on October 14. The single album was produced by Lee Hyun Do of the legendary Korean hip hop duo Deux under the stage name D.O.

Myname's first Japanese film Shinokubo Story was released on November 16, 2013. The film tells the story of five young Korean men from different paths of life who are scouted to take part in a potential K-Pop group from the Shin-Ōkubo neighborhood of Tokyo.

Myname released their third Japanese single album "Shirayuki" on November 20 and debuted at #6 on the daily Oricon chart and #7 on the weekly chart with sales of 25,263 albums. The single album included "Sha La La" which was used as the opening and ending theme for live broadcasts of the July 2013 National High School Baseball Championship in Japan as well as in television commercials for Aoyama Mainland.

=== 2014–2015: Five Stars, Second mini-album and I.M.G.: Without You ===
Myname held Hall Tour in Japan concerts Hands Up in Tokyo on January 12 and Osaka on January 13 to an audience of 8,000. They released their second Japanese album Five Stars on March 26. The music video for the lead single of the album "F.F.Y." was released on February 19 The album sold 19,473 physical copies on its first day of release and ranked #2 on the Oricon daily chart.

The group also sang the theme song "Take Me to the Moon" for the Toei Company film Taekwondo Soul - Rebirth (テコンドー魂～REBIRTH) released February 15, 2014.

The group embarked on a series of house tours entitled Myname Live House Tour 2014 ~WOW!~. The first pair of concerts started between May 14–15 in Tokyo's Shinjuku Blaze and the Liquid Room, respectively, from May 17–18 in Kanagawa's Yokohama Bay Hall and last pair from May 20–21 in Osaka's Umeda Club Quattro.

Seyong participated in and won the MBC Music reality dance series Idol Dance Competition D-STYLE as the #1 male idol. Along with #1 female idol winner, GI's OneKet, Seyong won an endorsement deal with DEMISODA which included a CF that also starred Insoo and Chaejin.

The group continue the second series of house tour entitled Myname Live House Tour 2014 ~WOW!~ Vol.2 began on September 11 at Shinjuku Blaze, followed by a pair of shows between September 13–14 at Umeda Club Quattro and in Fukuoka at Drum Logos, respectively, and on September 21 in Miyagi at Rensa. After the wrapped up the second house tour, Myname held Myname Japan 2nd Hall Tour 2014 ~Five Stars~ started from September 19–20 at Zepp Nagoya and Zepp Namba, respectively, in Tokyo on September 28 at Nippon Seinenkan and September 30 at Shibuya Public Hall.

Between January 10–25, Myname held Myname Live House Tour 2015 ~WOW!~ Vol.3 in 8 cities in Japan. They held encore of the house tour series, Myname Live House Tour 2015 "WOW SPECIAL" ~ COMPLETE ~ on January 31 in Tokyo.

Myname's second Korean mini album was released on February 12 with the title track "Too Very So Much".

The group released their third Japanese album I.M.G.: Without You on March 10 with the lead single "Stop the Time". The album topped the Oricon Daily Album Chart with 34,879 albums sold within 24 hours. "Stop The Time" was also chosen as the theme song for the NTV drama series Five Star Tourist.

Myname released their fourth Korean single album with the title track "Just Tell Me" on May 13.

To celebrate the 3rd anniversary of their Japanese debut, Myname released their fourth Japanese single "Hello Again" on July 28. The single debuted at #1 on the Oricon Daily Chart with 31,129 units sold. This is their second #1 daily ranking.

Myname also starred in a daily web series entitled Pocket Boyfriend from MUH Lab which has each member individually trying to woo a mysterious person and is told from the point of view of that person.

In August, a fan vote was initiated to determine the track list of a "best of" album entitled Mybestname! which was released on November 4. The album includes the top 10 songs as voted on by fans plus songs chosen by the members and one new song, "Mygirl." Mybestname! debuted at #4 on the Oricon Daily Chart, but jumped to #1 with sales of 22,798. To support the album release, Myname embarked on a month-long national tour.

=== 2016: European tour, Alive: Always in Your Heart ===
After completing another 13 city, 19 performance house tour in Japan entitled Myname Live House Tour ~ 1st Story ~ in March and April 2016, Myname embarked on a European tour under Arpeggios Entertainment. The group held concerts in Germany, Sweden, Poland, Romania, Spain, Portugal, United Kingdom and France from September 1 to 11, 2016.

Myname signed an exclusive contract with Virgin Records Japan under Universal Music Japan. They also released their fourth Japanese album, Alive: Always in Your Heart, on December 7, 2016. The album debuted at #7 on the Oricon Daily Chart and #2 on the Oricon Weekly Chart.

=== 2017–2019: Myname Is, solo projects and enlistment ===
On March 2, 2017, Seyong was introduced as the Red Ranger in Power Rangers Dino Force Brave, a 12-episode Korean-produced sequel to the Japanese series Zyuden Sentai Kyoryuger. The series premiered April 1, 2017 in South Korea and later aired in Japan. Seyong also sang the series' theme song, "Dino Force Brave".

Myname released their 5th Japanese album Myname Is on July 18, 2017 and debuted at #2 on the Oricon Daily Chart selling 13,316 albums. During promotions for the album release, member In-soo announced that he would be enlisting in the military for his mandatory service in the fall. Before his enlistment, In-soo released his first solo Japanese album entitled Naked on September 6, 2017 featuring the title track "Naked Love". It debuted at #12 on the Oricon Daily Chart and #19 on the Oricon Weekly Chart having sold 3,346 albums.

Insoo enlisted on October 26, 2017. Later that month, the remaining four members participated in The Unit. Gunwoo and Chaejin were eliminated in 37th place and 38th place, respectively, during the second elimination round. Jun.Q was eliminated in 24th place during the third elimination round. And Seyong finished in 17th place during the final round, failing to join the winning group.

Myname released of their sixth Japanese album Kiseki with the lead single "Wiz" on July 25, 2018. The album debuted at #3 with 10,337 units sold.

On December 4, 2019, H2 Media stated that Myname disbanded following the expiration of their contracts. In an interview with entertainment website Osen, Seyong denied the group's dissolution, noting their ongoing activities in Japan. H2 Media later clarified that the group did not disband.

=== 2025–2026: Reunion with Vivid, Re:Blue ===
On April 12, 2025, MYNAME will be releasing their first mini album in 7 years, VIVID, on July 2nd, and will also be holding a concert on July 25th in celebration of their Japan debut 13th anniversary.

MYNAME announced their comeback with their 8th album, RE:Blue, on April 29, 2026 in Japan.

== Members ==
- Gunwoo – leader, main vocalist
- Seyong – rapper
- Insoo – vocalist
- Jun.Q – rapper, vocalist
- Chaejin – sub-vocalist

== Discography ==
- We Are Myname (2013)
- Five Stars (2014)
- I.M.G.: Without You (2015)
- Alive: Always in Your Heart (2016)
- Myname Is (2017)
- Kiseki (2018)

== Filmography ==
=== Feature films ===
- 2013: Shinokubo Story – lead actors

=== Dramas ===
- 2012: Dream High 2 (KBS) – Episode 1 cameo
- 2013: Thunderstruck Stationery Store (Tooniverse) – Episode 8 guest stars
- 2017: Power Rangers Dino Force Brave (Daewon Media) - Seyong as Kwon Juyong (Brave Red Dino Ranger)
- 2020: Wish You: Your Melody From My Heart (Viki) - Insoo as Kang Insoo (Lead)
- 2021: Nobleman Ryu's Wedding (WeTV) - Insoo as Ryu Ho Sun (Lead)
- 2021: Starting Point of Dating - Insoo as Kye Han Sol (Lead)

=== Reality shows ===
- 2011: Ta-Dah! It's Myname Real Story (SBS MTV)
- 2012: Diary (SBS MTV)
- 2013: Myname W Kitchen (Tokyo MX)
- 2013: Myname Is Myname (Online)
- 2012–2016: Let's Go! Dream Team Season 2 (KBS) – recurring
- 2017-2018: The Unit (KBS) - Seyong, Jun.Q, Gunwoo, Chaejin

=== Web series ===
- 2015: Pocket Boyfriend (MUH Lab)
