= Kim So-jung =

Kim So-jung is the name of:

- Kim So-jung (tennis) (born 1986), South Korean tennis player
- Kim So-jung (singer) (born 1989), South Korean singer
