= Power Rangers Dino Force Brave =

2017 South Korean television series

- The show's original logo.
- Also known as: Zyuden Sentai Kyoryuger Brave
- Genre: Tokusatsu; Superhero fiction
- Created by: Daewon Media, Toei Company
- Written by: Kento Shimoyama
- Directed by: Koichi Sakamoto
- Starring: Kim Se-yong; Oh Se-hyeon; Hong Sung-ho; Injun; Lee Yu-jin; Lee Se-young
- Narrated by: Shigeru Chiba
- Opening theme: "Zyuden Sentai Kyoryuger Brave" by Showgo Kamada
- Ending theme: "Dino Dance!" by Yeo Hee
- Composer: Toshihiko Sahashi
- Country of origin: South Korea
- No. of episodes: 12

Production
- Producers: Shinichiro Shirakura (Toei); Naomi Takebe (Toei); Hwang Tae-hun (Daewon)
- Camera setup: Single-camera
- Running time: 15 minutes

Original release
- Release: April 1 – June 23, 2017

Related
- Zyuden Sentai Kyoryuger

Power Rangers Dino Force Brave (Korean: 파워레인저 다이노포스 브레이브; RR: Pawoleinjeo Dainoposeu Beureibeu) is a 2017 South Korean tokusatsu television show produced by Daewon Media, the same company which distributes the Super Sentai Series in South Korea under the "Power Rangers" label despite being unrelated to Saban Brands. It serves as a sequel to the 2013 Super Sentai Series, Zyuden Sentai Kyoryuger. Toei Company, the owner of the Super Sentai franchise, collaborated in the filming. Kyoryuger director Koichi Sakamoto returned to direct the series. The show began its broadcast in South Korea on April 1 with two episodes a week for the first two weeks before moving to one episode a week starting April 15. The majority of the main cast is composed of K-pop artists.

The show was dubbed into Japanese by Toei under the label Zyuden Sentai Kyoryuger Brave (獣電戦隊キョウリュウジャーブレイブ, Jūden Sentai Kyōryūjā Bureibu). The Japanese dub version was streamed on Bandai's official YouTube channel, as well as through the Toei Tokusatsu Fan Club in Japan starting on April 14.

== Story ==
Peace returns to Earth after the Power Rangers Dino Force (Kyoryugers) destroyed the Deboth Army, but a new enemy known as the Neo Deboth Army emerges to seek out revenge against the Earth Power Dinos (Zyudenryu) while obtaining "the Power of Dragon King" to conquer the planet. Sensing their presence, yet unable to fight them due to his Spirit state, Torin saves Canderrilla and Luckyulo from being sealed with Bragigas as the three recruit a "People of the Strong Dragons" to combat the new threat.

== Episodes ==
Individual episodes are known as "Kings".

No.	Title	Original release date	Japanese release date
1	"The Birth of a New King / He's Here! King the Dragon's Child" "でたァーッ！竜の子キング (Detā! Ryū no Ko Kingu)" (Korean: 새로운 킹의 탄생!, romanized: Saeroun King-ui Tansaeng!)	April 1, 2017	April 14, 2017
Sometime after the Kyoryugers defeated the Deboth Army, having sacrificed his physical body for their victory, Torin senses a new evil and comes to the aid of Canderrilla and Luckyuro by separating the Spirit Base from Bragigas as the Zyudenryu was being sealed away by one of the two members of a new evil called the Neo-Deboth Army. The other member, Homuras, proceeds to attack the humans under the orders of their leader Deizarus to force one with the power of the Dragon King to reveal himself. While police officer Jeon Hyeonjun and popstar Kim Sechang attempted to deal with Homuras's Zorima, the grunts are being dispatched by a mysterious youth whose Zyudenryu partner Guntyra appears to fight a Bojinma that Homuras summoned. Deeming the youth as another Daigo, Torin presents Kwon Juyong with a Gaburevolver that transforms into more enhanced version which he uses to become an enhanced version of Kyoryu Red to drive Homuras away. Brave Kyoryu Red then gives Hyeonjun and Sechang their own Gabugaburivolvers to become Brave Kyoryu Black and Brave Kyoryu Blue, the three combining Guntyra with the Zyudenryu Stegonsaw and Shovecera to create Brave Kyoryuzin to destroy the Bojinma as two people witnessed the event from afar.
2	"Come on, New Warriors! / Gather! New Warriors" "集まれ！新たな戦士たち (Atsumare! Arata na Senshi-tachi)" (Korean: 모여라, 새로운 전사들이여!, romanized: Moyeora, Saeroun Jeonsadeul-iyeo!)	April 1, 2017	April 14, 2017
After accepting Torin's request to become Kyoryugers, Juyong, Hyeonjun, and Sechang proceed to search the city from other Kyoryugers with Canderrilla and Luckyuro. By chance, Canderrilla and Luckyuro encounter bratty teens before they and the Kyoryugers find themselves under attack by the Neo-Deboth Army member Arash who injured Canderrilla. The Kyoryugers hold off the Zorima while Canderrilla and Luckyuro find themselves being protected by the two bratty teens as they manage to overwhelm Arash when he may them lose their tempers. Noting them as Brave, Brave Kyoryu Red gives the two their own Gabugaburivolvers to become Brave Kyoryu Green and Brave Koryu Pink as they forced Arash into a counter before he summons a Bojinma to cover his escape. The three Kyoryugers then combine Guntyra with the new members' Zyudenryu Parasaser and Rapx to form Brave Kyoryuzin Western to destroy the Bojinma, as a mysterious Kyoryuger watches. Later, after Lee Pureun and Yun Dohee formally introduce themselves, Torin assign Hyeonjun and Sechang as their mentors.
3	"Gabugaburincho, We Are a Team! / Gabugaburincho! All Gathered" "ガブガブリンチョ！全員集合 (Gabugaburincho! Zen'in Shūgō)" (Korean: 가브가브린초, 우리는 팀이다!, lit. 'Gabeugabeurincho, Urineun Tim-ida!')	April 8, 2017	April 21, 2017
With things not going well for them in their training, Pureun and Dohee formally introduce themselves, Hyeonjun, Sechang, Pureun, and Dohee find Juyong in the middle of his sparring with Guntyra. He explains that he is training to become as strong as his older brother whom he got separated from as a child, consider his teammates as family. Meanwhile, the mysterious mercenary Juhyeok appears before the Neo-Deboth Army to offer his services in dispatching the Kyoryugers. While Deizarus accepts Juhyeok's offer, Wahab and Tsuraira felt their cannot trust him as they travel to Earth to deal with the Kyoryugers personally. While the two Neo-Deboth Army members overwhelm Brave Kyoryu Black and Brave Kyoryu Blue, Brave Kyoryu Green and Brave Kyoryu Pink turn the tables as Juyong deems the team to be fully formed before joining his teammates in driving Wahab and Tsuraira off. Wahab summons Bojinma and two Giant Zorima to cover their escape, with the Kyoryugers using Brave Kyoruzin's formations to defeat their opposition. Later, while playing soccer with his friends, Juyong encounters Juhyeok.
4	"Threat! The Space Mercenary / Too Strong! The Space Mercenary" "強すぎだぜ！宇宙傭兵 (Tsuyosugi da ze! Uchū Yōhei)" (Korean: 강적! 우주용병, lit. 'Gangjeok! Uju Yongbyeong')	April 8, 2017	April 28, 2017
After receiving his payment to test the Kyoryugers' skills, Juhyeok proceeds to Earth to confront the Kyoryugers during their training exercise after Juyong ran off. Juhyeok introduces himself as a Dinosaur Hunter before he transforms into Brave Koryu Gold and overpowers the four Kyoryugers. Brave Kyoryu Red then appears and battles Brave Kyoryu Gold one-on-one, feeling a bit of nostalgia from facing him, before Guntyra intervenes. Gold counters by summoning his Zyudenryu partner Pteravolton while the Kyoryugers form Brave Kyoryuzin, only to be defeated when Brave Kyoryu Gold transforms Pteravolton into Brave Pteraiden-Oh. But Brave Kyoryu Gold spares the Kyoryugers while taking his leave, telling the Neo-Deboth Army members that killing the Kyoryugers will cost extra while Deizarus is amused with the results. Later, as Torin is perplexed who Juhyeok is, the Kyoryugers refuse to lose to him again.
5	"Counterattack! Win Any Wall! / The Great Counterattack! I'll Win the Wall" "大反撃！壁は超えてやる (Daihangeki! Kabe wa Koeteyaru)" (Korean: 반격! 어떤 벽이든 이겨내라!, lit. 'Bangyeok! Eotteon Byeog-ideun Igyeonaela!')	April 15, 2017	May 5, 2017
While Juhyeok received the ideal payment to kill them, the Kyoryugers formulate their counterattack before Juyong gets a call from Juhyeok to settle things. Brave Kyoryuzin Western faces Brave Pteraiden-Oh, with the Kyoryugers using their individual strengths to defeat their opponent. The Kyoryugers take their fight with Brave Kyoryu Gold to a warehouse, overwhelming him before Brave Kyoryu Red's hesitation gave him an opening. But Brave Kyoryu Gold is taken back by Juyong's determination, losing to the youth who recognized him as his missing older brother to the others' shock.
6	"Brother! Howling Crying Soul / Brother! When Juyong Cries" "兄さん！ジュヨンが叫ぶとき (Niisan! Juyon ga Sakebu Toki)" (Korean: 형! 울부짖는 주용의 영혼!, lit. 'Hyeong! Ulbujijneun Juyong-ui Yeonghon')	April 22, 2017	May 12, 2017
While revealed to be Juyong's big brother, Juhyeok denies it while telling Juyong that his team will not be lucky sometime. Asking the others to yet him handle this, Juyong tries to gather his thoughts as where he and his brother spared before seeing Juhyeok. Seeing no choice, Brave Kyoryu Red battle Brave Kyoryu Gold and defeats him with his own attack. Juyong then demands answers from Juhyeok before they are attacked by Homuras and his fellow Neo-Deboth Army member Raimein, Juhyeok appearing to emit energy as he covers Juyong while explaining it changes nothing between them. The other Kyoryugers arrive, Juhyeok reluctantly accepting their help as the Neo-Deboth Army members' action ended his contract with them. The two generals are forced to flee while summoning a Bojinma which Brave Kyoryuzin battles before combining with Pteravolton to become Braven Raiden Kyoryuzin to destroy it. Juhyeok then takes his leave, giving the Kyoryugers his card if they need his services.
7	"Advent! Neo-Deboth's Commander/ Advent! I'm Deizarus" "降臨！我こそデイザルス (Kōrin! Ware koso Deizarusu)" (Korean: 강림! 네오 데보스군의 총재!, lit. 'Ganglim! Neo Deboseugun-ui Chongjae')	April 29, 2017	May 19, 2017
The Kyoryuger discuss the turn of events with Juhyeok now a free agent when Torin senses a vast evil presence. The Kyoryugers find Juhyeok being attacked by Deizarus, who believes mercenary to be the Dragon King he has been hunting for. The Kyoryugers soon find themselves easily overpowered with Deizarus taking his leave once noticing Juhyeok ran off. Seeing Juyong in the dumps, Sechang confronts Juhyeok alone before they are ambushed by Tsuraira. Taking advantage of Juhyeok tossing his gold coins at Tsuraira, Sechang battles the Neo-Deboth Army commander before Juhyeok intervenes as the other Kyoryugers arrive. As Juyong apologizes for worrying everyone, Juhyeok claims to have a contract with the Kyoryugers on the grounds that he will help them five times. The six Kyoryugers proceed to overpower Tsuraira before he enlarged and is destroyed by Brave Raiden Kyoryuzin. Soon after, to counter Deizaurus, Torin decides to free Gigabragigas.
8	"Revival! Gigabragigas / The Great Revival! Gigabragigas" "大復活！ギガブラギガス (Daifukkatsu! Gigaburagigasu)" (Korean: 부활! 기가브라기가스!, lit. 'Buhwal! Gigabeulagigaseu!')	May 6, 2017	May 26, 2017
Telling the others to hurry as fast as they can to Gigabragigas, Torin explains that they need to destroy the Neo-Deboth Army member who created the seal. The Kyoryugers were about to enter the cave when Juhyeok arrives to stop them from reviving Gigabragigas, only for Hyeonjun to hold the mercenary at bay before they are attacked by Raimein. After Juhyeok drives Raimein away, he and Hyeonjun join the other Kyoryugers in defeating the Neo-Deboth Army member Jinarik to break the seal on Gigabragigas. Though the Zyudenryu is freed, Jinarik revives while placing Gigabragigas under his control to attack the city.
9	"I'll Show You! The Strongest and Largest Combination" "見せてやる！最強最大の合体 (Miseteyaru! Saikyō Saidai no Gattai)" (Korean: 보여주마! 최강 최대의 합체!, lit. 'Boyeojuma! Choegang Choedaeui Habche!')	May 13, 2017	June 2, 2017
The Kyoryugers try to reach Gigabragigas before the Zyudenryu cover them to fall back to the Spirit Base. The group soon formulate a plan for Torin to reach Gigabragigas by first destroying Jinarik to present an open window. The next day, the Kyoryugers battle Jinarik before they see an explosion from where Brave Kyoryu Gold is fighting Wahab. After letting Brave Kyoryu Red go to Juhyeok's aid, the other Kyoryugers quickly defeat Jinarik so Torin can purify Gigabragigas. Jinarik responds by enlarging, only for he and his supporting Giant Zorima to be wiped out by Gigabragigas as it transforms into Brave Gigant Bragi-Oh. Meanwhile, noting the birthmark on Juhyeok's neck has vanished, Wahab realizes the mercenary's secret once Juyong comes to his aid and attempts to retreat to inform Deizaurus. But Juhyeok kills the Neo-Deboth Army member before he proceeds to strike Juyong down.
10	"Farewell! Brave Gold Dino / Farewell! Brave Kyoryu Gold"" "さらば！ブレイブキョウリュウゴールド (Saraba! Bureibu Kyōryū Gōrudo)" (Korean: 안녕! 브레이브 골드 다이노!, lit. 'An-nyeong! Beuleibeu Goldeu Daino')	May 20, 2017	June 9, 2017
Knocking Juyong out to keep his power as the real Dragon King from awakening, Juhyeok takes his leave to call the remaining Neo-Deboth Army members as Raimein, Homuras, Arash answer. Brave Kyoryu Gold proceeds to fight the three Neo-Deboth Army commanders on his own and is greatly overpowered as his opponents realize something is amiss. Despite being warned not to interfere after they arrive, the other Kyoryugers support him while Torin finds Juyong as he realizes Juhyeok is his brother. Juyong arrives as Raimein confirmed Juhyeok to not be the possessor of the Dragon King power, Juyong reveals himself to be the actual Dragon King while telling his brother to stop protecting him as they and the other Kyoryugers proceed to drive Raimein and Homuras off. But Arash refuses to accept defeat and enlarges, only to be destroyed after the five main Kyoryugers then combine their Zyudenryu with Brave Gigant Bragi-Oh to form as Brave Gigant Kyoryuzin. Later, apologizing for underestimating Juyong, Juhyeok takes his leave while commenting that his brother have grown into a truly brave man.
11	"Which One Is Real?! The King of Dinosaurs / Which One Is Real?! The Dragon King" "本物は誰だ?!竜の王 (Honmono wa Dare da?! Ryū no Ō)" (Korean: 진정한 용왕은 누구인가!, lit. 'Jinjeonghan Yong-Wang-Eun Nugu-Inga')	May 27, 2017	June 16, 2017
Torin explains that the Dragon King is a figure whose vast amount of Brave makes him the strongest being in the universe, the group realizing that Juyong is now going to be targeted by the Neo-Deboth Army. Deizarus proceeds to enact his end game, sacrificing Homuras to be destroyed by Brave Gigant Kyoryuzin while attacking Juhyeok during his fight with Raimein. Once Juyong arrives, Deizarus abducts him once confirming him to be the Dragon King so he can siphon his power for his own to become a destroyer of worlds. Meanwhile, with the other Kyoryugers' blessing, Juhyeok mounts a rescue mission.
Finale	"Be Forever! Dino Force Brave! / Forever! Kyoryuger Brave" "永遠に！キョウリュウジャーブレイブ (Eien ni! Kyōryūjā Bureibu)" (Korean: 영원하라! 다이노포스 브레이브!, lit. 'Yeong-Wonhala! Dainoposeu Beuleibeu!')	June 3, 2017	June 23, 2017
After fighting his way through the Neo-Deboth Army's base, Juhyeok destroys Raimein before freeing Juyong from Deizarus's tendrils. Once the brothers make their peace, they proceed to fight Deizarus together before escaping in Pteravolton. But Deizarus enlarges while turning his spaceship into an exosuit to pursue the two Kyoryugers before they are joined by the other Kyoryugers as they form a Dragon King-powered Brave Raiden Kyoryuzin to destroy Deizarus. With Torin departing as his work is done, the Kyoryugers part ways to resume their normal lives. As Juyong and Juhyeok being their training journey, they cross paths with the Zyuohgers after summoning them with special Zyudenchi.

== Cast ==
Korean cast

- Kim Se-yong (Myname) as Kwon Juyong
- Hong Sung-ho (Apeace) as Jeon Hyeonjun
- Oh Se-hyeon (Apeace) as Kim Sechang
- Injun (DGNA) as Lee Pureun
- Lee Yu-jin (Fave Girls) as Yoon Dohee
- Lee Se-young (Cross Gene) as Juhyeok
- Song Joon-seok as Torin (Voice)
- Kim Do-young as Canderrilla (Voice)
- Chae Min-ji as Luckyuro (Voice)
- Min Eung-shik as Deizarus (Voice)
- Lee Hyun as Raimein (Voice)
- Lee Jang-won as Homuras (Voice)
- Kim Tae-hoon as Wahab (Voice)
- Hwang Chang-yeong as Tsuraira (Voice) and Jo Haneul (Voice)
- Yi Ki-sung as Arash (Voice)
- Kim Min-joo as Jinarik (Voice)
- Jang Mi as Shark Ranger (Voice)
- Kwon Chang-wook as Lion Ranger (Voice)
- Jeong Ju-won as Elephant Ranger (Voice)
- Seo Yu-ri as Tiger Ranger (Voice)
- Yoo Hae-moo as Narration, Brave Dino Force Ranger Equipment Voice

Japanese cast

- Masaki Nakao (中尾 暢樹, Nakao Masaki) as Jo Haneul (Yamato Kazakiri (風切 大和, Kazakiri Yamato) in Zyuden Sentai Kyoryuger Brave)

Japanese dub voice actors

- Kwon Juyong (クォン・ジュヨン, Kwon Juyon): Yūtarō Honjō (本城 雄太郎, Honjō Yūtarō)
- Jeon Hyeonjun (チョン・ヒュンジュン, Chon Hyunjun): Yamato Kinjo (金城 大和, Kinjō Yamato)
- Kim Sechang (キム・セチャン, Kimu Sechan): Yasunao Sakai (坂井 易直, Sakai Yasunao)
- Lee Pureun (イ・プルン, I Purun): Daiki Kobayashi (小林 大紀, Kobayashi Daiki)
- Yun Dohee (ユン・ドヒ, Yun Dohi): Kanae Oki (沖 佳苗, Oki Kanae)
- Juhyeok (ジュヒョク, Juhyoku) Shouma Yamamoto (山本 匠馬, Yamamoto Shōma)
- Torin (トリン): Toshiyuki Morikawa (森川 智之, Morikawa Toshiyuki)
- Canderrilla (キャンデリラ, Kyanderira): Haruka Tomatsu (戸松 遥, Tomatsu Haruka)
- Luckyuro (ラッキューロ, Rakkyūro): Ai Orikasa (折笠 愛, Orikasa Ai)
- Deizarus (デイザルス, Deizarusu): Kenyu Horiuchi (堀内 賢雄, Horiuchi Ken'yū)
- Raimein (ライメイン): Daichi Hayashi (林 大地, Hayashi Daichi)
- Homuras (ホムラス, Homurasu): Tetsu Inada (稲田 徹, Inada Tetsu)
- Wahab (ウェイハブ, Weihabu): Soichi Abe (あべ そういち, Abe Sōichi)
- Tsuraira (ツライラ): Kazuki Watanabe (渡辺 和貴, Watanabe Kazuki)
- Arash (アラッシュ, Arasshu): Daigo Fujimaki (藤巻 大悟, Fujimaki Daigo)
- Jinarik (ジナリック, Jinarikku): Syuichi Nishitani (西谷 修一, Nishitani Shūichi)
- Zyuoh Shark (ジュウオウシャーク, Jūō Shāku): Miki Yanagi (柳 美稀, Yanagi Miki)
- Zyuoh Lion (ジュウオウライオン, Jūō Raion): Shohei Nanba (南羽 翔平, Nanba Shōhei)
- Zyuoh Elephant (ジュウオウエレファント, Jūō Erefanto): Tsurugi Watanabe (渡邉 剣, Watanabe Tsurugi)
- Zyuoh Tiger (ジュウオウタイガー, Jūō Taigā): Haruka Tateishi (立石 晴香, Tateishi Haruka)
- Narration, Kyoryuger Equipment Voice: Shigeru Chiba (千葉 繁, Chiba Shigeru)

== Songs ==
Opening theme

- "Dino Force Brave" (Korean: 다이노포스 브레이브; RR: Dainoposeu beureibeu)
  - Lyrics: Yeo Hee
  - Composition: Yohei Onishi (大西 洋平, Ōnishi Yōhei)
  - Arrangement: Takeharu Nakahata (中畑 丈治, Nakahata Takeharu) (Project.R)
  - Artist: Brave Red Dino (Kim Se-yong)
  Episodes 2/9, 3/7, 4/10, and 5/8/11 use version performed by Brave Blue Dino (Oh Se-hyeon), Brave Black Dino (Hong Sung-ho), Brave Green Dino (Injun), and Brave Gold Dino (Lee Se-young) respectively. The opening theme of Zyuden Sentai Kyoryuger Brave, titled "Zyuden Sentai Kyoryuger Brave" (獣電戦隊キョウリュウジャーブレイブ, Jūden Sentai Kyōryūjā Bureibu) with Japanese lyrics by Nozomi Inoue (井上 望, Inoue Nozomi), is performed by Showgo Kamada (鎌田 章吾, Kamada Shōgo) (Project.R).

Ending theme

- "Dino Dance!" (Korean: 다이노 댄스!; RR: Daino daenseu!)/ダイノダンス! (Daino Dansu!)
  - Lyrics: Yeo Hee
  - Lyrics (Japanese Translation): Nozomi Inoue
  - Composition: Hideaki Takatori (高取 ヒデアキ, Takatori Hideaki)
  - Arrangement: Hiroaki Kagoshima (籠島 裕昌, Kagoshima Hiroaki) (Project.R)
  - Artist: Yeo Hee (Project.R)

== Other appearances ==
- The fifth Super Hero Taisen series movie, Kamen Rider × Super Sentai: Ultra Super Hero Taisen, features Raimein (one of the Neo-Deboth generals), and a game iteration of Utsusemimaru utilizing Kwon Juhyeok/Brave Gold Dino's GabuGabuChanger and its suit. Both the former general and the latter device made its first appearance in Japanese theaters before the release of Dino Force Brave.
