= Jun.Q =

South Korean rapper and actor (born 1993)

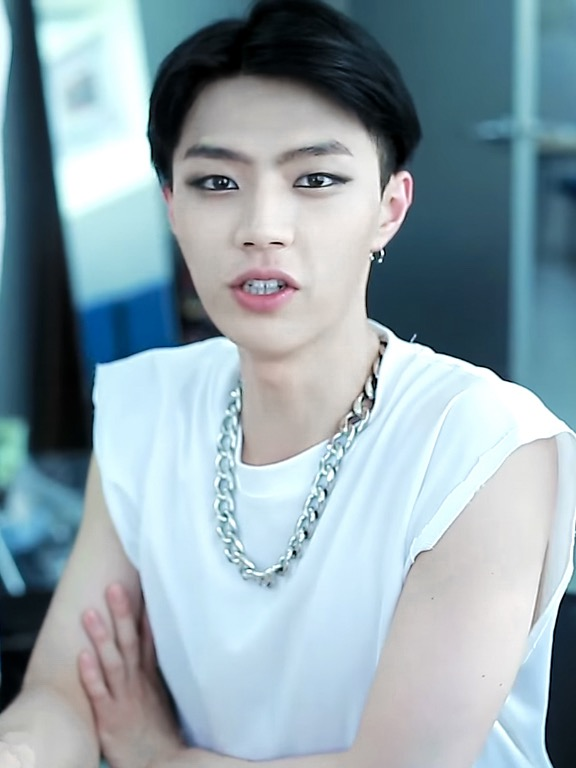
- Jun.Q in July 2015
- Born: August 9, 1993 (age 33); Uijeongbu, South Korea
- Occupations: Rapper; singer; actor; model
- Years active: 2011–present
- Musical career
- Genre: K-pop
- Labels: H2 Media; YM3D; Virgin; YY Entertainment
- Website: myname-jp.com

Korean name
- Hangul: 강준규
- RR: Gang Jungyu
- MR: Kang Chun'gyu

Kang Jun-kyu (Korean: 강준규; born August 9, 1993), better known by his stage name Jun.Q (준Q), is a South Korean rapper, singer, actor, and model. Signed to H2 Media, he made his debut with idol quintet Myname in 2011. His acting debut took place two years later in the film Shinokubo Story along with his bandmates. He appeared on the web series beautiology101 in his home country and starred in the film Saihate Restaurant in Japan. He released his debut solo single "Firenze" in November 2019.

== Life and career ==
=== 1993–2010: Early life and career beginnings ===
Jun.Q was born Kang Jun-kyu on August 9, 1993, in Uijeongbu, the younger of two children and first son to his parents. As a middle school student, he played the guitar in his school band. He was encouraged by his homeroom teacher to pursue a career as a singer and Jun.Q persuaded his parents to enroll him into a performance hagwon. He moved to the Guro District upon entering high school and lived alone. During his first year as a high school student, he was a model for school science and social studies textbooks. Due to the strain of being a student and trainee, Jun.Q briefly cut off communication with his agency. After hearing trainee stories of his friends, he decided to apologize to the CEO and returned to the company. He graduated from the School of Performing Arts Seoul in 2012.

=== 2011–present: Music and acting career ===
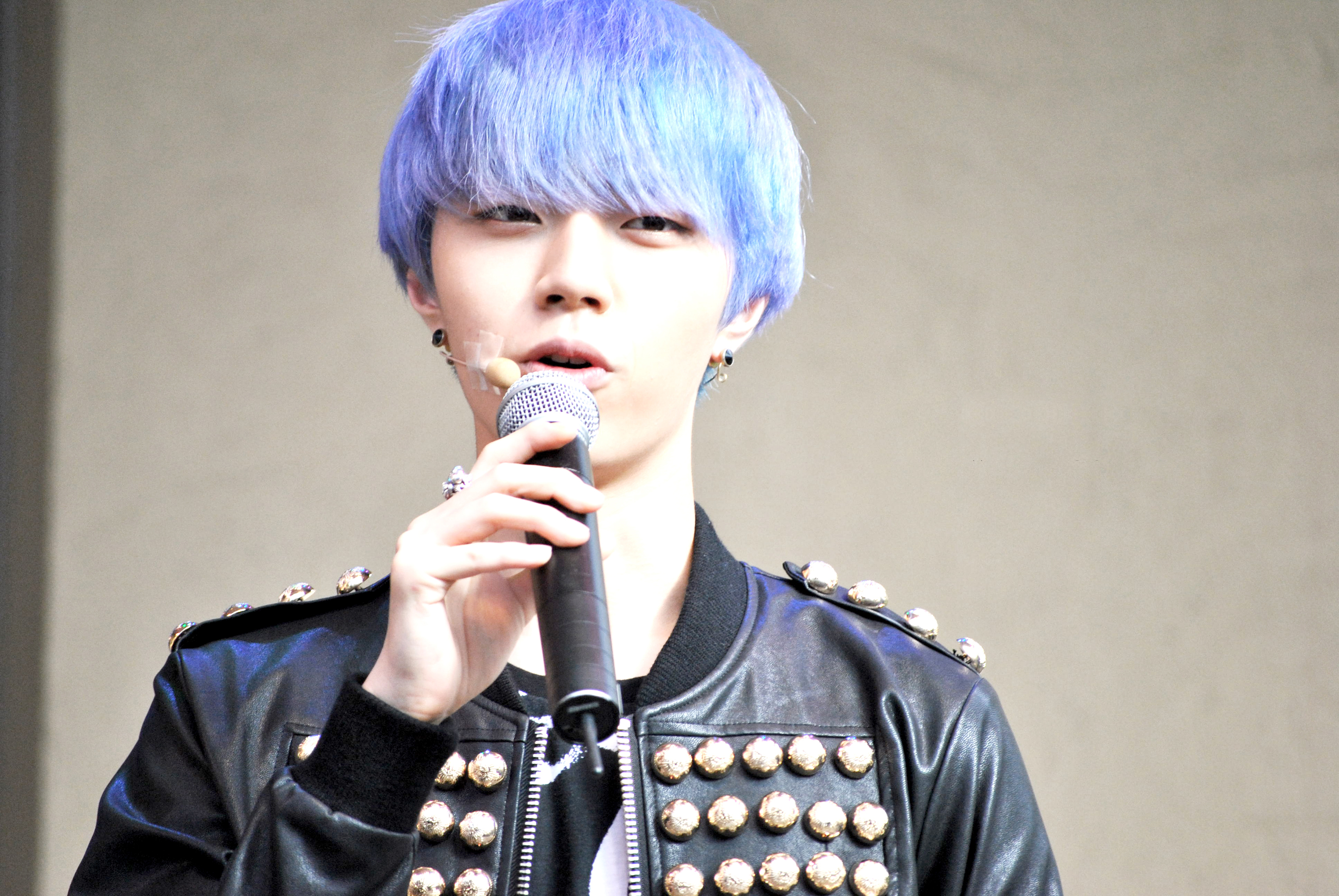
Jun.Q at a release event for Myname's Japanese single "What's Up", November 2012

Jun.Q debuted as a rapper in the idol group Myname in 2011. The group released its debut single "Message" on October 28. After learning of his debut as a singer, the publisher of the school textbooks sought to renew their contract with Jun.Q; they received a conditional agreement from H2 Media to publish photography taken by the company. A Japanese-language version of Myname's debut song was released the following July, which served as their introductory single in the country. The group was simultaneously active in the music industry of both countries. Having expressed interest in acting in 2012, he starred in the film Shinokubo Story (2013) along with Myname, where he played one of five characters seeking to become "stars".

Beginning in 2015, Myname's promotional activities in South Korea waned. Jun.Q went on to compete on the survival competition series The Unit: Idol Rebooting Project along with bandmates Seyong, Chaejin, and Gunwoo. It was their first domestic promotional activities in two years. The participants competed to become a member of the all-male unit UNB. Jun.Q was eliminated and was listed at number 24 on the program's rankings. He was cast on OnStyle's web drama beautiology101 (2016) as Du Yi. The series centers around cosmetics and takes place at the fictional K-Beauty School. He also played the role of Eiji in the 2016 Japanese drama Kyabasuka Gakuen. He starred in the film Saihate Restaurant (2019) alongside Ryouta Murai. He released his debut solo single "Firenze" on November 8, 2019.

Jun.Q enlisted in mandatory military service on June 22, 2020. He received military training at the Korea Army Training Center in Nonsan, South Chungcheong Province.

On August 22, 2023, it was announced that he has signed a contract with YY Entertainment.

== Musical style ==
Jun.Q has cited Dynamic Duo and Jay-Z as his role models.

== Discography ==
=== Singles ===
Title	Year	Album
"Firenze" (휘파람; Hwiparam)	2019	Non-album single

== Filmography ==
=== Television series ===
Title	Year	Role	Notes	Ref.
beautiology101	2016	Du Yi	Supporting role	
Kyabasuka Gakuen	2016	Eiji	Episode 8	
The Unit: Idol Rebooting Project	2017–2018	Himself	Contestant	

=== Films ===
Title	Year	Role	Notes	Ref.
Saihate Restaurant	2019	Han Ji-seok	Lead role	

=== Web/BL series ===
Title	Year	Role	Notes	Ref.
Individual Circumstances	2023	Sung Woo-Jae	Lead role	
