= Superstar K 2 =

- Season 2
- Hosted by: Kim Sung-joo; Ahn Hye-Kyung
- Judges: Lee Seung-chul; Uhm Jung-hwa; Yoon Jong-shin
- Winner: Huh Gak
- Runner-up: John Park
- Finals venue: Kyung Hee University Grand Peace Hall

Release
- Original network: Mnet; KM
- Original release: July 23 – October 22, 2010

Season chronology
- ← Previous; Superstar K 1 Next → Superstar K 3

Superstar K2 is a South Korean television show on Mnet. Superstar K2 is season two of the Superstar competition series in which singers audition to get on the show. Each week, the singers perform a song and are eliminated based on the three judges' perception and audience voting. The winner of Superstar K2 received 200 million won ($172,282 USD) and a Samsung QM5 car.

This program began on July 23, 2010 and ended October 22, 2010 with the announcement of Huh Gak as the winner and Korean-American John Park as the runner-up.

== Format ==
The auditions took place in 8 cities across South Korea (Daejeon, Incheon, Daegu, Gwangju, Chuncheon, Jeju Island, Busan, Seoul) and Los Angeles. There were about 1 million and 350 thousand people that participated in this show and 151 were chosen. The 151 contestants were to participate in a 3-day competition called Superweek. The competition consists of 3 missions; The Sing-Off, the Group Mission and the Rival Mission (the interview round if necessary).

The Sing-off consists of 16 people per zone. There, 4 people are chosen and choose some contestants for the Wild Card round. At the end, 50 people are selected for the next mission.

The Group Mission consists of 5 members per group. All groups have a leader and each get to choose which member they wish to have in their group. Each group is given an overnight practice for the songs they have chosen and perform for the judges the next day. There, the judges decide on which members to proceed to the next mission. The number of people for the next mission vary from 20-24.

In this year's show, the judges decided to have an emergency wild card round to let some of the good singers who failed into the next round. They chose Kang Seung-yoon (17), Kim Greem (24), Kim He Min (24), Kim Yon-jin (25), Moon Son Young (26), Woo Eun-mi (19), John Park (23) and Hyun Seung-hee (15) to get on cars. In the end, John Park, Hyun Seung-hee, Kang Seung-yoon and Kim Greem successfully passed the round and joined the rest of the Top 24. The other four were taken to Seoul Station.

The Rival Mission consists of two rivals per pair. The pairs are organised by two people having the similar vocal skills. Like the group mission, the rivals are given an overnight practice and perform the next day. There is only one winner per pair and there are no cases of both members going through.

However this year, in the Rival Mission some pairs had both members eliminated due to their lacking effort. Only 7 members were chosen (Kim Ji-soo (21), Park Bo-ram (17), Kang Seung-yoon (17), Kim Greem (24), Lee Bo-ram (19), Kim Eun-bi (18) and John Park (23). The judges once again held a wild card round and selected Andrew Nelson (15), Hyun Seung-hee (15), Jang Jae-in (20), Kim So-jung (22), Huh Gak (26) and Kim Bo-kyung (21).

With 13 people, the judges held an interview round where the contestants are interviewed through various questions and decide whether to eliminate the contestant or let them proceed into the Top 10. In the end, Kim Bo-kyung and Hyun Seung-hee were eliminated.

During Top 11, contestants participated in many missions throughout live shows and get special awards. The total scores of the contestants add up by

- 10%-Internet votes
- 30%-Judges scores
- 60%-Mobile text votes

If somehow the performer got the highest total score, they will be automatically Super Saved and proceed to the next round.

Huh Gak won the show against John Park 988:596 and won 200 million won and a QM5.

== Top 11 ==
Name	Place	Age
Huh Gak (허각)	Winner	26
John Park (존 박)	Runner-up	23
Jang Jae-in (장재인)	Top3	20
Kang Seung-yoon (강승윤)	Top4	17
Kim Ji-soo (김지수)	Top6	21
Kim Eun-bi (김은비)	Top6	18
Park Bo-ram (박보람)	Top8	17
Andrew Nelson	Top8	15
Kim Greem (김그림)	Top11	24
Kim So-jung (김소정)	Top11	22
Lee Bo-ram (이보람)	Top11	19

== Group Mission (Top 50) ==
No.1- Gummy: Kid

Name	Age	Results
Choi Hyung-hyol	22	Eliminated
Noh Seung-min	28	Eliminated
Andrew Nelson	15	Advanced
Baek Ye-seul	22	Eliminated
Joo Eun-ji	17	Advanced

No.2- Park Bom: You and I

Name	Age	Results
Han Kyung-soo	25	Eliminated
Kim Ji-soo	21	Advanced
Lee Bo-ram	19	Advanced
Sun Ji-hye	23	Advanced
Kim Soon-nyun	27	Eliminated

No.3- Wonder Girls: 2 Different Tears

Name	Age	Results
Kim Yon-woo	18	Eliminated
Jang Jae-in	20	Advanced
Kim Yon-jin	25	Eliminated
Park Myung-hyun	22	Eliminated
Hong Nam-hwa	23	Advanced

No.4- Park Mi Kyung: Meaningless Reason

Name	Age	Results
Moon Sun-young	26	Eliminated
Kim Bo-kyung	21	Advanced
No Dae-young	23	Advanced
Choi Joon-hyuk	19	Advanced
Lee Young-suk	26	Eliminated

No.5- JYP: Honey

Name	Age	Results
Sean Lee	23	Advanced
Woo Eun-mi	19	Eliminated
Seo Hyo-song	18	Eliminated
Kim So-jung	22	Advanced
Park Dong-soo	25	Eliminated

No.6- Brown Eyes: Already a Year

Name	Age	Results
Lee Young-min	25	Eliminated
Jeon Hye-young	22	Eliminated
Kang Hwa-ran	7	Eliminated
Lee Bo-kyung	20	Advanced
Kang In-soo	23	Advanced

No.7- Kim Tae Woo: Love Rain

Name	Age	Results
Hwang Hye-in	21	Eliminated
Myoung Hye-jin	22	Eliminated
Kim Hye-min	24	Eliminated
Lee Je-yoon	20	Eliminated
Um Ji-hwan	22	Eliminated

No.8- 2AM: Can't let you go, even if i die

Name	Age	Results
Huh Gak	26	Advanced
John Park	23	Eliminated
Hyun Seung-hee	15	Eliminated
Kim Geu-rim	24	Eliminated
Kim Song-beob	21	Advanced

No.9- Davichi: 8282

Name	Age	Results
Hyun Ji-hye	20	Advanced
Maeng Jung-eun	17	Eliminated
Kang Seung-yoon	17	Eliminated
Yoon Ho-young	20	Advanced
Lee Jung-young	21	Eliminated

No.10- CNBLUE: Love

Name	Age	Results
Gu Su-kyong	21	Eliminated
Kim Eun-bi	18	Advanced
Park Bo-ram	17	Advanced
Seo Hyon-woo	25	Eliminated
Kang Jin-sol	18	Eliminated

Last Consolation (Wild Card)

Name	Age	Results
Kang Seung-yoon	17	Advanced
Kim Geu-rim	24	Advanced
Kim Hye-min	24	Eliminated
Kim Yon-jin	25	Eliminated
Moon Sun-young	26	Eliminated
Woo Eun-mi	19	Eliminated
Hyun Seung-hee	15	Advanced
John Park	23	Advanced

== Rival Mission (Top 24) ==
No.	Names	Category	Winner	Wild Card	Wild Card Result
1	Jang Jae-in & Kim Ji-soo	Guitar Artist	Kim Ji-soo	Jang Jae-in	Advanced
2	Kang In-soo & Ju Eun-ji	Performance Singers	None		
3	Lee Bo-kyoung & Sun Ji-hye	Ballad Vocal	None		
4	Sean Lee & Yoon Ho-young	Rap & RnB	None		
5	Hyun Seung-hee & Park Bo-ram	Low-Teen Vocal	Park Bo-ram	Hyun Seung-hee	Eliminated
6	Kang Seung-yoon & No Dae-young	Male Guitarists	Kang Seung-yoon		
7	Kim Bo-kyung & Kim Geu-rim	Female Guitarists	Kim Geu-rim	Kim Bo-kyung	Eliminated
8	Hyun Ji-hye & Hong Nam-hwa	Power Vocal	None		
9	Kim Seo Jung & Lee Bo-ram	Dance Vocal	Lee Bo-ram	Kim Seo Jung	Advanced
10	Kim Song-bob & Choi Joon-hyuk	Sensitive Vocal	None		
11	Kim Eun-bi & Andrew Nelson	High-Teen Vocal	Kim Eun-bi	Andrew Nelson	Advanced
12	John Park & Huh Gak	Soul Vocal	John Park	Huh Gak	Advanced

- Winner of each group advanced to the next round. Both of the competitors were eliminated in some of the pairs.
- Wild cards were interviewed by the judges once again, and some of them were selected to advance to the next round.

== Live shows ==
- Bold=Super Save (highest judges score before Top 4, directly advanced to the next round regardless of the public vote)
- Italics=Eliminated
- Normal=Safe

=== Episode 9 ===
Weekly Mission: Visual/Health/Vocal Mission

Winner: Male Team (John Park, Kim Ji-su, Andrew Nelson, Kang Seung-yoon, Huh Gak)

Reward: Shopping Spree

Performance- Remake hits (1960–2010)

Order	Name	Song	By	Judges Score	Results
1.	Andrew Nelson	I Love You	Han Dong Joon, 1993	254	Safe
2.	Kim Geu-rim	Boarder	Choi Hwi Joon, 1968	253	Eliminated
3.	Lee Bo-ram	Timeless	SG Wannabe, 2004	245	Eliminated
4.	Park Bo-ram	As Time Goes by	Choi Ho Sob, 1988	280	Safe
5.	Kang Seung-yoon	You're My Girl	Lee Seung Gi, 2004	237	Safe
6.	Kim So-jung	Stop the Wind	Lee Ji-yon, 1989	263	Eliminated
7.	Huh Gak	The Happy Me	Echo, 1997	278	Safe
8.	John Park	10 Minutes	Lee Hyo Ri, 2003	255	Safe
9.	Kim Eun-bi	All I know is Love	Shim Su Boong, 1979	275	Safe
10.	Kim Ji-su	The Yellow-necked Chappy	Han Myong Sook, 1961	284	Safe
11.	Jang Jae-in	With You	Nam Jin, 1979	288	Super Save

=== Episode 10 ===
Weekly Mission: Musical

Winner: Andrew Nelson

Reward: House Captain, Performance Order

Performance: Lee Moon Sae Special

Order	Name	Song	Date	Judges Score	Result
1.	Kang Seung-yoon	Her Laughing Sounds	1987	217	Safe
2.	Park Bo-ram	Farewell Story	1987	258	Eliminated
3.	Andrew Nelson	The Cult of Solo	1998	217	Eliminated
4.	Kim Ji-su	If Love Goes By	1987	261	Safe
5.	Huh Gak	Early Morning Discount	1996	286	Super Save
6.	Kim Eun-bi	Unknown Life	2006	246	Safe
7.	Jang Jae-in	Standing Under A Roadside Tree	1988	270	Safe
8.	John Park	In the Rain	1985	274	Safe

=== Episode 11 ===
Weekly Mission: Composing Mission

Winner: Kang Seung-yoon, Jang Jae-in, Huh Gak

Reward: Call to love one, Free Time

Performance: Michael Jackson Special

Order	Name	Song	Date	Judges Score	Result
1.	Kim Eun-bi	Heal the World	1991	255	Eliminated
2.	Kang Seung-yoon	Black or White	1991	265	Safe
3.	Kim Ji-su	Ben	1972	274	Eliminated
4.	Jang Jae-in	The Way you Make me Feel	1987	274	Safe
5.	Huh Gak	I'll Be There	1970	282	Safe
6.	John Park	Man In The Mirror	1987	289	Super Save

=== Episode 12 ===
Weekly Mission: Worldstar Performance Mission

Winner: Huh Gak

Reward: Headphones, Performance Order

Performance: Judges Hit Remake

Order	Name	Song	By	Judges Score	Result
1.	Jang Jae-in	Invitation	Uhm Jung-hwa, 1998	279	Safe
2.	Huh Gak	Don't Say Goodbye	Lee Seung-chul, 1989	274	Safe
3.	John Park	Nights Where I Can't Sleep	Lee Seung-chul, 1989	283	Safe
4.	Kang Seung-yoon	By Instinct	Yoon Jong-shin, 2010	281	Eliminated

=== Episode 13 ===
Weekly Mission: Candid Camera Mission

Winner: Huh Gak

Reward: Digital Camera, Performance Order

Performance: Audiences' Song Choice

Order	Name	Song	By	Judges Score	Result
1.	Huh Gak	Running Through The Skies	2 Juk (Lee Juk), 2003	287	Safe
2.	John Park	Your House	JYP, 2007	278	Safe
3.	Jang Jae-in	Lemon Tree	Park Hye-kyoung, 2008	285	Eliminated

=== Episode 14 ===
Weekly Mission: Commercial Mission

Winner: John Park

Reward: 100 boxes of Coca-Cola, 3D Laptop, Performance Order

Performance: Free Performance & Title Song Performance

Order	Name	Song	By	Judges Score	Song	Judges Score	Result
1.	John Park	Drunken Truth	Exhibition, 1996	280	Always (J.Version)	284	Runner Up
2.	Huh Gak	Love Rain	Kim Tae Woo, 2009	284	Always (H.Version)	293	Winner
