= Park Bo-ram =

South Korean singer (1994–2024)

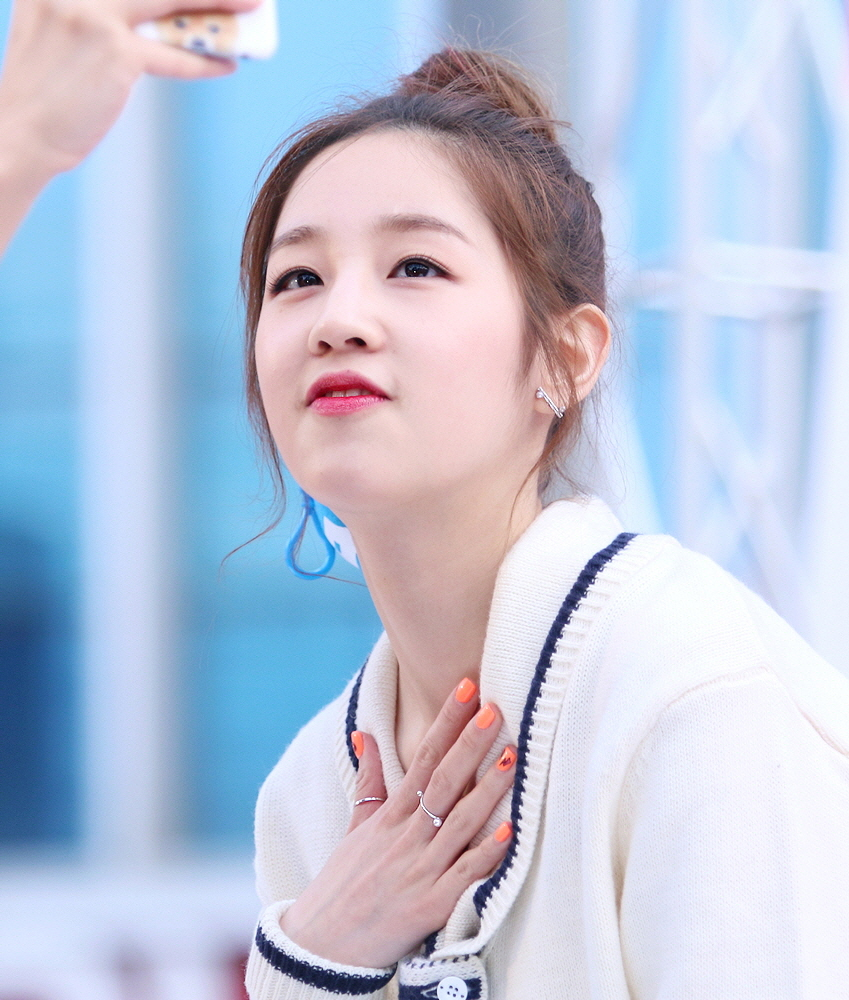
- Park in 2015
- Born: March 1, 1994; Chuncheon, Gangwon Province, South Korea
- Died: April 11, 2024 (aged 30); Guri, South Korea
- Occupation: Singer
- Musical career
- Genres: K-pop; R&B
- Instrument: Vocals
- Years active: 2010–2024
- Labels: MMO; Huayi Brothers; Xanadu

Korean name
- Hangul: 박보람
- RR: Bak Boram
- MR: Pak Poram

Park Bo-ram (Korean: 박보람; March 1, 1994 – April 11, 2024) was a South Korean singer. She took part in Mnet's SuperStar K2 and finished in eighth place. Park made her debut with release digital single "Beautiful" featuring Zico on August 7, 2014. That year, she won Artist of the Year for August at the Gaon Chart K-Pop Awards and was nominated for Best New Artist at the Mnet Asian Music Awards, Golden Disc Awards, and Melon Music Awards. She died at age 30 from acute alcohol poisoning after collapsing at her friend's home.

== Early life ==
Park was born on March 1, 1994, in Chuncheon, South Korea. She has an older and a younger brother. In 2010, their father died of cirrhosis, followed by their mother on October 3, 2017 due to an illness.

== Career ==
=== 2010–2014: Pre-debut ===
In 2010, Park Boram finished as the Top 8 on SuperStar K2. Talking about her experience in the singing competition, she stated: "I also gained the experience of performing on stage through Superstar K2. I realized that I need to feel comfortable in order to not make mistakes." She signed and trained in Jellyfish Entertainment before moving to CJ ENM's subsidiary MMO Entertainment, currently known as WakeOne, for her debut.

In 2011, Park recorded the song "Always" for SBS's 49 Days soundtrack.

At the end of 2011, Jellyfish Entertainment released a Christmas-themed single featuring the company's artists, including Park.

In March 2014, she made a surprise appearance in Hong Dae Kwang's "Thank You My Love" music video. Before her debut, she gained attention for having lost 32 kg since her Superstar K2 days.

=== 2014–2016: Debut with Beautiful and Celepretty ===
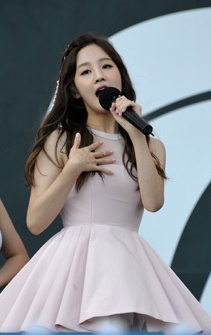
Park performing in 2014

On August 7, 2014, Park Boram debuted with the release of the single "Beautiful" featuring rapper Zico.

Park made her official stage debut at SBS Inkigayo on August 10, 2014. "Beautiful" peaked at number 2 on Gaon.

On November 12, 2014, Park acted in Natthew's music video for the single "Love Will Be Ok" as his love interest.

On January 22, 2015, Park released the soundtrack song "Falling" for the drama Hyde Jekyll, Me. On April 23, Park's first mini album Celepretty was released along with a lead single of the same title. Her single reached to number 7 on Gaon. On May 15, Park released a single called "Super Body" to promote CJ's dietary drink "Fat Down", with her as their model. On June 19, she appeared in Mamamoo's "Um Oh Ah Yeh" music video. That month, she also released collaboration song "Pretty Bae" with singer Lee Hyun.

On September 21, Park featured in Park Kyung's solo track, "Ordinary Love", which peaked at number 3 on Gaon Digital charts. She and Eric Nam attended The Walk, a virtual experience event held at the Yongsan CGV in Seoul on October 12. Park performed as part of the line-up for KCON 2015 JEJU. On October 7, Park returned with the release of the single titled "Sorry", which peaked at number 30. On November 28, Park released the soundtrack song "혜화동 (혹은 쌍문동); lit. 'Hyehwadong (Or Ssangmundong)'" for the drama Reply 1988.

=== 2016–2018: Orange Moon and digital singles ===
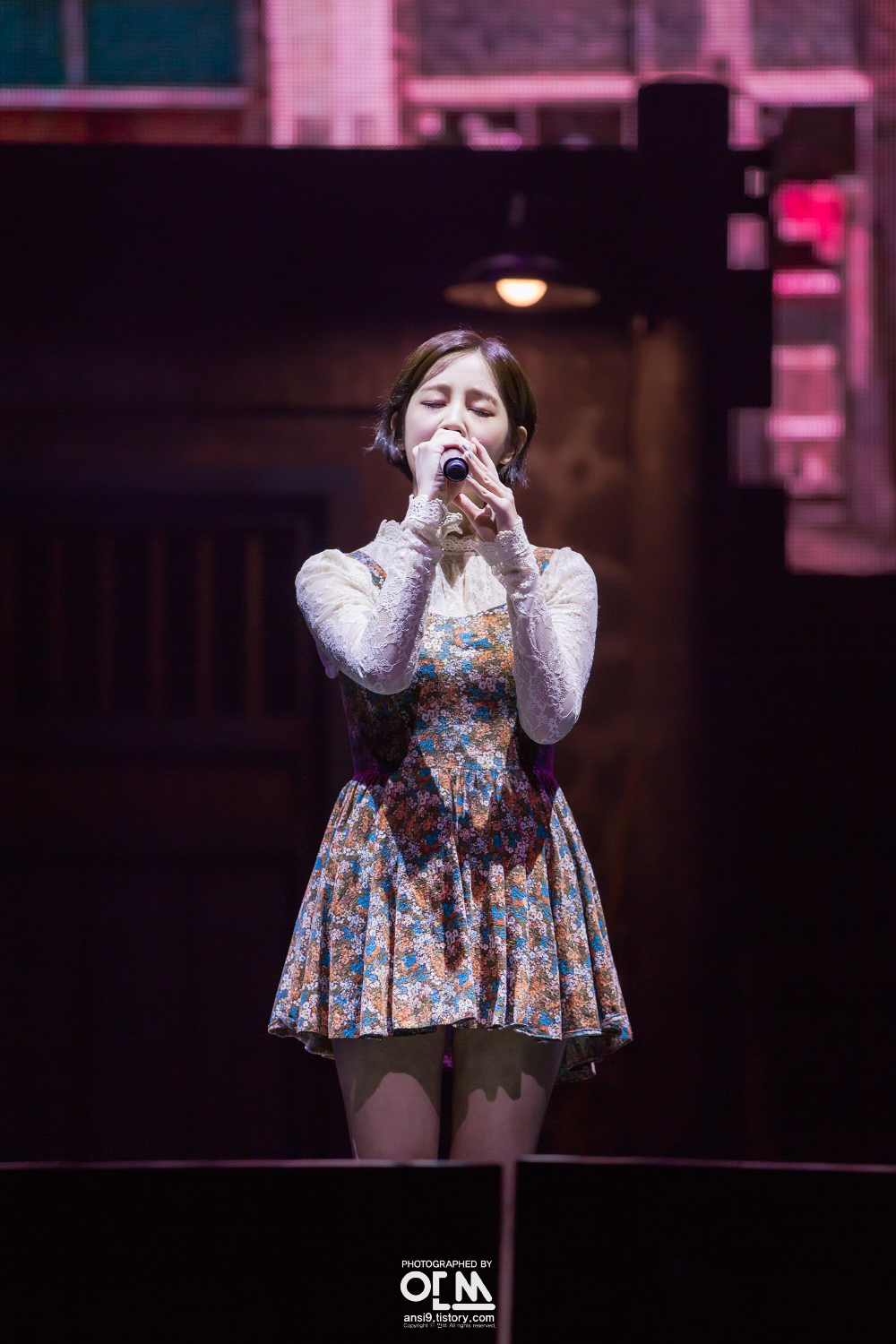
Park performing in March 2016

Park released an acoustic single called "Dynamic Love" on April 21, 2016.

Park also appeared as a contestant on the singing competition program King of Mask Singer as "I Am Completely Shrill-Voiced".

On July 13, 2017, Park returned with the release of her second mini album titled Orange Moon with the lead single "넌 왜?; lit. 'Why, You?'" featuring artist Samuel Seo.

On December 1, 2017, Park released the soundtrack song "꿈만 같아; lit. 'Like A Dream'" for the drama Prison Playbook.

Park released a ballad single titled "애쓰지 마요; lit. 'Will Be Fine'" on February 13, 2018.

On April 6, 2018, Park Boram released a digital single titled "말려줘; lit. 'Please, Stop Me'", featuring Lil Boi of Geeks.

=== 2018–2024: Label changes and final projects ===
In October 2018, Park signed with new agency Huayi Brothers.

In December 2021, Park signed with Xanadu Entertainment.

== Personal life ==
Park was in a relationship with singer and actor Seo In-guk from 2016 to 2018.

== Death ==
On April 11, 2024, Park was found collapsed and undergoing cardiac arrest at her friend's home in Seoul. The Namyangju police department filed an incident report on April 12 stating that Park was at a private gathering with two other friends on the evening of April 11. She excused herself and went to the washroom at approximately 9:55 p.m. and did not return for an extended period of time. Park's friends "found her slouched over the sink, unconscious."

The Korean police further discovered that Bo-ram and two friends drank together about a bottle of soju at a Namyangju house. The friends performed CPR until the ambulance arrived, but she was pronounced dead at Hanyang University Guri Hospital at 11:17 p.m. A legal opinion was earlier issued by National Forensic Service that "the cause of death was unknown" and was undergoing investigation at the time of the report. The autopsy performed on April 15 revealed negative signs of homicide or suicide according to Xanadu Entertainment. On May 23, the autopsy report determined that her death was due to acute alcohol poisoning, confirming police reports of her underlying liver conditions.

The funeral home wake was held at Room 21 of Asan Medical Center followed by funeral procession at 6 a.m. KST on April 17. Bo-ram's younger brother held her portrait, while Roy Kim led the pallbearers. Fellow former Superstar K contestants Huh Gak and Kang Seung-yoon, Park Jae-jung, Giant Pink, Kara's Heo Young-ji, actress Go Eun-ah, EXID's Seo Hye-lin and Kim jointly paid a memorial tribute. The burial followed at Seoul Memorial Park, Chuncheon's Dongsan Memorial Park in Gangwon Province, South Korea.

== Discography ==
=== Extended plays ===
Title	Album details	Peak chart positions	Sales
Title	Album details	KOR	Sales
Celepretty	Released: April 23, 2015; Label: MMO Entertainment, CJ E&M; Format: CD, digital download; Track listing: 1. "Beating Heart"; 2. "Celepretty"; 3. "Before After " 4. "Lonely Night"; 5. "Beautiful" (feat. Zico)	14	KOR: 880+
Orange Moon	Released: July 14, 2017; Label: MMO Entertainment, CJ E&M; Format: CD, digital download; Track listing: 1. "Why, You?" (feat. Samuel Seo); 2. "Moonwalk"; 3. "Irony"; 4. "Imaginary Date"; 5. "You Know"	44	—N/a

=== Singles ===
Title	Year	Peak chart positions	Sales	Album
Title	Year	KOR	Sales	Album
As lead artist
"Beautiful" (예뻐졌다) feat. Zico	2014	2	KOR: 1,047,559+	Celepretty
"Celepretty" (연예할래)	2015	7	KOR: 747,730+	Celepretty
"Sorry" (미안해요)	2015	30	KOR: 118,359+	Non-album singles
"Pretty Bae" (예쁜사람) with Lee Hyun	2015	53	KOR: 61,575+	Non-album singles
"Dynamic Love"	2016	53	KOR: 81,624+	Non-album singles
"Why, You?" (넌 왜?) feat. Samuel Seo	2017	91	KOR: 26,932+	Orange Moon
"Will Be Fine" (애쓰지 마요)	2018	67	—N/a	Non-album singles
"Please, Stop Me" (말려줘) feat. Lil Boi	2018	—	—N/a	Non-album singles
"If You" (#결별) with GB9	2018	80	—N/a	Non-album singles
"How About U" (괜찮을까)	2018	—	—N/a	Non-album singles
"One More Shot" (한 잔만 더 하면)	2018	—	—N/a	Non-album singles
"To My Unloving Self" (나를 사랑하지 않는 나에게)	2018	—	—N/a	Non-album singles
"Do as I Like" (싶으니까)	2019	—	—N/a	Non-album singles
"Alone" (두 혼자) with Parc Jae-jung	2019	—	—N/a	Non-album singles
"I Can't" (못하겠어)	2020	—	—N/a	Non-album singles
"I Hope" (좋겠다) with Huh Gak	2024	140	—N/a	Non-album singles
As featured artist
"Ordinary Love" (보통연애) Park Kyung feat. Park Bo-ram	2015	3	—N/a	Notebook
"—" denotes release did not chart.

=== Promotional singles ===
Title	Year	Peak chart positions	Sales	Album
Title	Year	KOR	Sales	Album
"Super Body"	2015	—	—N/a	Non-album single
"—" denotes release did not chart.

=== Soundtrack appearances ===
Year	Song	Album
2010	"두근두근 (Palpitations)" (with Kim So-jung and Lee Bo-ram)	Playful Kiss OST
2010	"I'll Stay" (with Kim Ji-soo)	Yacha OST
2011	"Always"	49 Days OST
2015	"Falling"	Hyde Jekyll, Me OST Part 1
2015	"일초가 한시간 (A Second like an Hour)" (with Eric Nam)	Flirty Boy and Girl OST
2015	"혜화동 (혹은 쌍문동) (Hyehwadong (Or Ssangmundong))"	Reply 1988 OST Part 4
2016	"거짓말이라도 해줘요 (Please Say Something, Even Though It's a Lie)"	W OST Part 2
2017	"Isn't She Lovely"	Introverted Boss OST Part 4
2017	"운명처럼 (Destiny)" (with Basick)	Man to Man OST Part 2
2017	"꿈만 같아 (Like a Dream)"	Prison Playbook OST Part 3
2018	"Yesterday"	About Time OST Part 2
2019	"왼손끝에 (Left over left hand)"	Touch Your Heart OST Part 6
2020	"두 번 다시 우리 (Let's Never Meet Again)"	Once Again OST Part 1

=== Compilation appearances ===
Year	Song	Album
2010	"이별이야기 (Farewell Story)"	Superstar K 2 Top11 Part.1
2010	"The Dreamers" (among Superstar K2 Top 11)	Superstar K2 Up To 11
2010	"세월이 가면 (As Time Goes By)"	Superstar K2 Up To 11
2016	"The Name (Live Ver.)"	Two Yoo Project Sugar Man Part.26
2016	"미워도 사랑하니까 (I Love You Even Though I Hate You)" (as I Am Completely Shrill-Voiced with Park Subin)	King of Mask Singer Episode 59
2016	"나란놈이란 (A Guy Like Me)" (as I Am Completely Shrill-Voiced)	King of Mask Singer Episode 60
2016	"The Way Home (Prod. By VIBE X KingMing) (집으로 (Prod. By 바이브X킹밍))" (with Lim Se-jun, U Sung-eun, Suran)	Melody to Masterpiece TRACK 4
2017	"인`썸`니아 (Insomnia)"	Story About: Some, One Month Episode 5
2017	"혼자만의 비밀 (My Secret)"	Immortal Songs: Singing the Legend (The Blue Edition)

== Filmography ==
=== Film ===
Year	Title	Role	Notes	Ref.
2025	When I'm Laying	Bo-mi	Posthumous release	

=== Television series ===
Year	Title	Role	Ref.
2015	Perseverance, Goo Hae Ra	Cameo with previous Superstar K contestants	

=== Television shows ===
Year	Title	Role	Notes	Ref.
2016–2020	King of Mask Singer	Contestant	Episode 59–60, 271–272	

== Awards and nominations ==
Name of the award ceremony, year presented, category, nominee of the award, and the result of the nomination
Year	Award	Category	Nominee / Work	Result	Ref.
2014	4th Gaon Chart K-POP Awards	Artists of the Year (August)	"Beautiful"	Won	
2014	4th Gaon Chart K-POP Awards	Artists of the Year (September)	"Beautiful"	Nominated	
2014	Mnet Asian Music Awards	Best New Artist	Park Boram	Nominated	
2014	Melon Music Awards	Best New Artist	Park Boram	Nominated	
2015	Golden Disk Awards	Digital Daesang	"Beautiful"	Nominated	
2015	Golden Disk Awards	Best New Artist	Park Boram	Nominated	
