= Apeace =

South Korean boy band

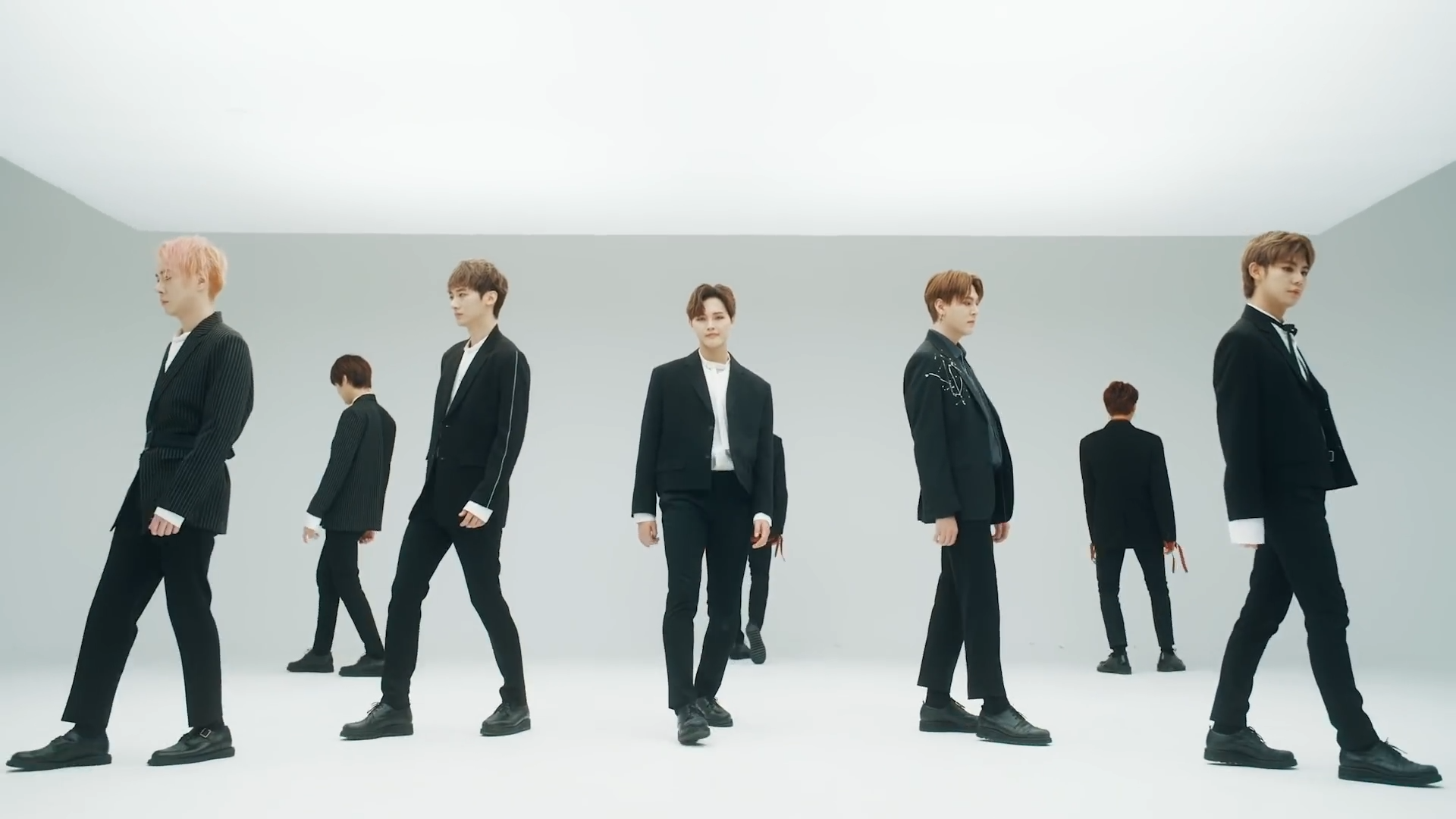

Background information
- Origin: Seoul, South Korea
- Genres: K-pop; J-pop
- Years active: 2011–2021
- Label: Golden Goose Entertainment
- Members: see Members
- Website: apeace.jp

Apeace (Korean: 에이피스; Japanese: エーピース), formerly known as Double B 21 (더블비21) or Double B, was a South Korean boy band formed and under Golden Goose Entertainment. The group was the largest K-pop boy band, with 21 members, until 30 June 2014, when it changed to 15 members. As of July 29, 2018, Apeace consists of 12 members.

The members were chosen and produced by Kim Kyungwook, known for working with groups such as H.O.T., Shinhwa and TVXQ.

Until 2015, subgroups performed 6 days a week, 2 times a day at K Theater at Yebisu Garden Place in Ebisu, Shibuya, Tokyo. The group now performs monthly concerts throughout Japan.

== History ==
=== Pre-debut ===
In 2009, members Hwang Du-hwan and Kim Wan-chul were set to be members of the fifth generation of XING (Crossing(X) in New Genre) (Korean: 씽) from XING Entertainment. Several members were models before debuting with Apeace. Ji Hyun-sung, Park Jae-won, Heo Chang-woo, and former member Hwang Seok-hyun and Im Ho-jun were models under DCM Models Management around 2008–2010. Yoo Dong-ho and Park Jae-won appeared on SBS's Star School in 2009 with other models such as Kim Woo-bin. Other members that modeled before debuting were Hong Sung-ho, Song Seung-hyuk, Lee Tae-woo, Choi Yeong-won, Im Yeong-kyun, Kim Seung-hyung, Min Jin-hong, Son Yu-chang, Oh Seung-hyun, and Lee Myung-eun.

Member Yoo Jae-deok (J.D), appeared on Star King's 100th episode in 2009 as a part of a kid's rock band. He was 12 years old at the time. He later served as the main vocalist for a kids progressive metal band named MetallateM, which was active from 2010–2012.

=== 2010: Debut of Double B 21 with "One" and "S.O.S" ===
The original line-up of Apeace was called "Double B 21", or "Double B". It contained four sub-units: "Sky," "Earth," "River," and "Burning." Sky debuted with the single "One" on Mnet's "M Rookies" on 25 August 2010. All members appeared together for the first time on 24 October 2010 at Lotte World and released their single "S.O.S" on 27 October.

In December, they changed their name to "A-peace" and they promoted "S.O.S" in Thailand. After a hiatus, members Jung Man-soo, Im Ho-jun, Lee Ha-neul, Hwang Seok-hyun, Im Yeong-kyun, Oh Seung-hyun, and Kim Dae-geon left the group. Kim Dae-geon later became a member of F.Cuz.

=== 2011: Debut of Apeace with "Lover Boy" ===
Their name changed for a third time, officially becoming Apeace. They released their debut mini-album in June 2011 called "We Are the One" as well as a music video for the song "Lover Boy" on 7 September 2011. The group was split into three sub-units with seven members each: Lapis, Jade, and Onyx. Jeong Eun-ho was replaced by Lee Tae-woo.

They were cited in Japan by programs such as Sankei Sports and Kuraberu Kurabera. In addition, a special program covering the group's debut was aired by Fuji TV. Members Son Yu-chang, Kim Seung-hwan, Lee Tae-woo, Hwang Doo-hwan, Hong Sung-ho and Song Seung-hyuk appeared on a food program called K-COOK.

On 11 May 2011, Apeace opened K Theater in Yebisu Garden Place in Ebisu, Tokyo and performed daily concerts until December 2014.

On 28 November 2011, Son Yu-chang left to continue studying composition and Lee Sung-woo left because of backache issues. They were replaced by Kim Won-shik and Lee Myung-eun, respectively. After recovering, Lee Sung-woo pursued a career as a drama musical actor.

=== 2012: Japanese Debut with "We Are the One" and major debut with "Hero" ===
In March 2012, Apeace released a mini album called "We Are the One" in Japan. The song was used for Glico Bitte, their first commercial. They held their first fan tour in Seoul in April 2012.

On September 29, they made their major Japanese debut with the release of their first full-length album 1st ALBUM Apeace. The promotional video for the title track "HERO" was released on 1 September 2012.

During this time, members Yoo Dong-ho, Jee Hyun-sung, Song Seung-hyuk, Kim Won-sik, Kim Jin-woo, and Lee Tae-woo appeared on the "Language of Love" segment of NOTTV's program Bidanshikai. From June 10 to July 1, members Hwang Du-hwan and Song Seung-hyuk appeared on HBC's program Sega Sammy Cup.

=== 2013: Japanese comeback with "X.O.X.O. ~Dreams~ / Never too late" and "Ur My Life" ===
By January 14, Apeace had performed a thousand concerts in Japan.

Apeace released a single album on February 13, 2013 titled "X.O.X.O. ~Dreams~/Never too late," to celebrate Valentine's Day. From March 8–11, they held their second fan tour in Seoul from March 8–11. 700 Japanese fans traveled to Korea with them. A fanmeeting was held at Konkuk University and a concert was held at Lotte World. ONYX member Song Seung-hyuk did not travel with them because he was admitted to the hospital in Japan on March 6 due to pneumothorax.

ONYX member Hwang Doo-hwan became a regular host on season 2 of NHK's weekly program Hangul Class (ハングル講座), starting on April 1, along with Koichi Akira, Ai Haruna, and 2PM.

Members Kim Seung-hyung, Kim Seung-hwan, and Jeong Ho-young left Apeace on April 23 to fulfill their mandatory military service. They were replaced by Yun Jun-sik, Kim Doo-hee, and Yoo Jae-deok (J.D), respectively.

On August 20, Apeace held two large concerts: "Apeace the 21 Live -3 Jewels-" and "Apeace the 21 Live -21 Jewels-" at Zepp Tokyo.

Apeace released the promotional video for their single "Ur My Life" on September 13 and released the album on October 16, which landed 11th on the Oricon Singles Chart.

On December 4, JADE member Ha Geon-hee was removed from the group's activities due to allegedly dating a fan. The following month, he resumed activities with Apeace.

=== 2014: Japanese comeback with "VEIL" and member graduation ===
On 17 February 2014, Apeace won a leadership award at the Republic of Korea Record Culture Awards.

ONYX member Lee Myung-eun was fired from Apeace on March 1. It was later revealed that he married someone in South Korea on March 15 and would not be returning to Apeace. He was replaced by Choi Sihyuk on April 9.

Apeace released a promotional video for their third Japanese single entitled "VEIL" on April 30. As part of their promotional events for VEIL, they held two large concerts on May 10 at the concert series LIVE ARCH, vol. 11 at the Tokyo International Forum.

On June 30, six members graduated from Apeace: Yoo Dong-ho, Park Jae-won, Mun Byeong-hun, Heo Chang-woo, Kim Doo-hee, and Lee Tae-woo. This left 15 members that were rearranged into 3 groups of 5: LAPIS5, JADE5, and ONYX5. Their promotions at K Theater continued as usual with these new subgroups starting July 5.

Apeace released a compilation album entitled "For You" on December 5, featuring solo songs by members Kim Wan-chul, Yoo Jae-deok, Oh Se-hyeon, Jeong Young-wook, and Hong Sung-ho. Apeace's second full-length album entitled "Colors" was released in Japan on December 24 and reached #5 on the Oricon Daily Albums Chart for December 23.

=== 2015: After K Theater ===
From their debut in Japan until their last performance at K Theater, Apeace had a total of 2199 daily performances and a cumulative audience of over 330,000 people. Apeace had their last performance at K Theater on 31 December 2014. They announced that they would be joint managed by Universal Music & EMI Artists and that they would have regular monthly performances, starting with 【Apeace LIVE 2015 ♯0(ZERO)】 on January 25 at Tokyo Mielparque Hall. In addition to monthly concerts, Apeace members have additional solo concerts during each of their birthdays.

Members Choi Young-won and Jeong Young-wook were cast in the musical On Air Night Flight, along with Teen Top's Chunji, U-KISS's Jun and Kevin Woo, and Supernova's Yunhak. It ran from February 5 to 12. In June, members Hong Sung-ho and Jung Young-uk were cast in the musical RUN TO YOU Street Life along with U-KISS's Soohyun and Jun, Supernova's Kwangsoo and Geonil, and Block B's Jaehyo and U-Kwon. It ran from June 26 to July 5.

Members Jee Hyun-sung and Kim Jin-woo enlisted in the military on February 24 and are scheduled to return on 19 November 2016. On March 3, it was announced that Min Jin-hong would rest indefinitely from Apeace activities due to poor condition of his knees and lumbar vertebrae. He remains a member of Apeace as a stage adviser. From March, Apeace continued to perform as a 12-member group.

In July, Apeace embarked on a fan tour to Hawaii which lasted from the 9th to the 14th.

Apeace received a trophy for Japan-Korea Diplomatic Normalization 50th Anniversary on July 19. They performed at the anniversary concert on the 20th along with other artists such as Supernova, Kim Da-hyun, Crazy Ken Band, ZERO, and Tendo Yoshimi.

A new subunit called FLOWERS debuted on August 3 at Tokyo FM Hall. It is composed of four members: Wan-chul, Young-uk, Si-hyuk, and J.D.

Apeace performed at A-Nation's concert "Asia Progress~Future~" on August 6 at Yoyogi National Gymnasium, alongside artists such as Hazzie, Solidemo, Tensai Bonjin, and sh**tkingz with guests from AAA and Da-ice They also performed at Meiji Jingu Stadium for the 2015 Jingu Gaien Fireworks Festival on August 11.

Apeace celebrated their fifth anniversary since their debut (as Double B 21 in 2010) with the release of "5th Anniv Best 'Pray for…'" on October 21. On November 18, they released a single album "Just Once Again" with an accompanying PV. "Just Once Again" contains the theme song to their new ODS: Once Again, Apeace's first starring movie. Once Again was screened in theaters around Shinjuku from November 21–27.

=== 2021: Disbandment ===
On September 29, 2021, their Japanese agency CONTAINER announced that the group will be disbanding in the end of December.

== Members ==
Adapted from the group's official website.

=== Current members ===
==== Subgroup Lapis5 ====
- Jung Young-uk (정영욱)
- Choi Si-hyuk (최시혁)

==== Subgroup Jade5 ====
- Ha Geon-hee (하건희)
- Yoo Jae-deok (J.D) (유재덕)
- Kim Won-sik (김원식)
- Choi Young-won (최영원)

==== Subgroup Onyx5 ====
- Ji Hyun-sung (지현성)
- Song Seung-hyuk (송승혁)
- Hong Sung-ho (홍성호)
- Kim Jin-woo (김진우)

=== Inactive ===
- Yun Jun-sik (윤준식) – in military
- Kim Wan-chul (김완철) – in military

=== Former members ===
==== Subgroup Lapis ====
- Kim Seung-hyung (김승형) – left April 23, 2013
- Moon Byung-hun (문병훈) – graduated June 30, 2014
- Heo Chang-woo (허창우) – graduated June 30, 2014
- Min Jin-hong (민진홍) – left July 29, 2018
- Oh Se-hyeon (오세현) – left July 29, 2018

==== Subgroup Jade ====
- Son Yu-chang (손유창) – left November 28, 2011
- Kim Seung-hwan (김승환) – left April 23, 2013
- Yoo Dong-ho (유동호) – graduated June 30, 2014
- Park Jae-won (박재원) – graduated June 30, 2014
- Kim Doo-hee (김두희) – graduated June 30, 2014
- Hwang Du-hwan (황두환) – left July 29, 2018

==== Subgroup Onyx ====
- Lee Sung-woo (이성우) – left November 28, 2011
- Jeong Ho-young (정호영) (now Jeong Da-ho [정다호]) – left April 23, 2013
- Lee Myung-eun (이명은) – fired March 1, 2014
- Lee Tae-woo (이태우) – graduated June 30, 2014

=== Timeline ===
- Red (horizontal) = Active
- Black (horizontal) = Inactive

== Discography ==
=== Studio albums ===
Title	Album details	Peak chart positions	
Title	Album details	JPN Oricon	JPN Hot
Apeace	Released: 26 September 2012 (JPN); Label: Wave Master; Format: CD, digital download	35	—
Colors	Released: 24 December 2014 (JPN); Label: Wave Master; Format: CD, digital download	20	—
Brave to Wonder	Released: 29 August 2018 (JPN); Label: Wave Master; Format: CD, digital download	14	18
We Are Apeace	Released: 14 December 2021 (JPN); Label: Rock Field; Format: CD, digital download	13	27

=== Singles ===
Title	Year	Peak chart positions		Album
Title	Year	JPN Oricon	JPN Hot	Album
"One"	2010	—	—	Non-album singles
"SOS"	2010	—	—	Non-album singles
"We Are the One"	2011	—	—	Apeace
"Hero"	2012	—	87	Apeace
"X.O.X.O ~夢を抱いて"	2013	14	57	Colors
"Ur My Life"	2013	13	55	Colors
"Veil"	2014	25	88	Colors
"Just Once Again"	2015	19	—	Brave to Wonder
"I Love You"	2016	12	16	Brave to Wonder
"Change My Life"	2017	12	49	Brave to Wonder
"Bang!Burn!Love!"	2017	13	41	Brave to Wonder
"Never Ever End"	2019	9	37	Non-album single

== Videography ==
=== Music videos ===
Year	Song	Album
2010	One	One
2010	S.O.S	S.O.S
2011	A Ring Mark	-
2011	Lover Boy	We Are The One
2011	Lover Boy (Dance Ver.)	We Are The One

=== Promotional videos ===
Year	Days	Song	Album
2011	November 29	Lover Boy	We Are The One
2012	December	We Are The One	We Are The One
2012	August	Hero	Apeace
2013	September 12	Ur My Life	Ur My Life
2014	April 7	VEIL	VEIL
2015	November 18	Just Once Again (short ver.)	Just Once Again
2015	December 24	in your hands	Apeace
2016	January 31	Carry On	5th Anniv Best 'Pray For'
2016	February 26	Brand new days	
2016	September 12	I Love You	I Love You
2017	February 18	どこまでも続く道を...	CHANGE my LIFE / どこまでも続く道を...
2017	November 10	BANG! BURN! LOVE	BANG! BURN! LOVE
2018	January 21	BANG! BURN! LOVE Dance Practice	BANG! BURN! LOVE

=== Commercials ===
Year	Product
2012	Glico Bitte
2015	Forty Niner Restaurant

=== Film ===
Year	Title	Producer	Distributor
2015	Once Again	Nagai Toru; Tsushima Keisuke; Ishida Mai	Universal and EMI Artists
