= Kim Se-yong =

South Korean singer and actor (born 1991)

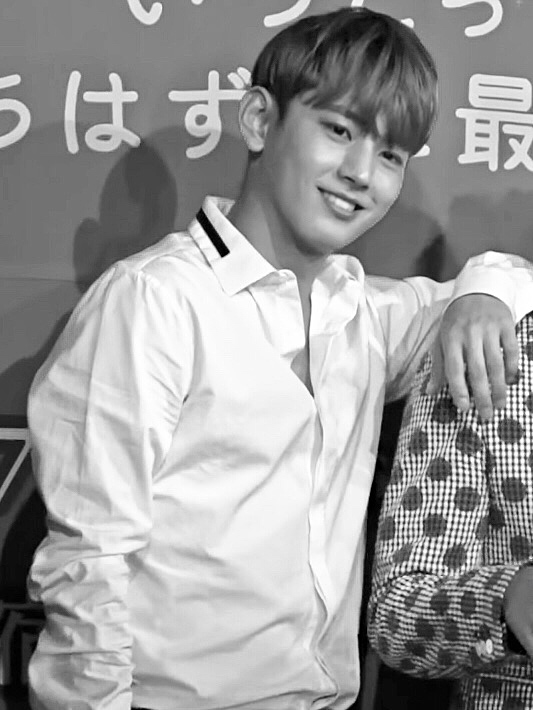
- Kim in June 2017
- Born: November 20, 1991 (age 34); Busan, South Korea
- Occupations: Singer; rapper; dancer; actor
- Years active: 2009–present
- Musical career
- Genre: K-pop
- Labels: H2 Media; YM3D; Virgin
- Website: myname-jp.com

Korean name
- Hangul: 김세용
- RR: Gim Seyong
- MR: Kim Seyong

Kim Se-yong (Korean: 김세용; born November 20, 1991) is a South Korean singer, rapper, dancer, and actor. Signed to H2 Media, he made his debut with idol quintet Myname in 2011. Kim began his acting career two years prior, appearing on the television series Green Coach. He released his first mini-album Connection independent from Myname in Japan in May 2019.

== Life and career ==
=== 1991–2008: Early life ===
Kim Se-yong was born on November 20, 1991, in Busan. In his youth, he aspired to become a soccer player. A friend uploaded Kim's photos onto an ulzzang website, which resulted in him being offered to become a trainee under JYP Entertainment. A representative of the agency traveled from Seoul to convince his parents to allow him to join, which they encouraged. Kim accepted the proposal and, attributing to other circumstances at the time, stopped playing soccer. While under the company, Kim wanted to become an actor and he enrolled at Seoul Institute of the Arts with a major in theater and film. He spent three years training under the entertainment label before deciding to leave and pursue acting. After seeing 2PM perform in concert, he was motivated to become a singer again.

=== 2009–present: Career ===
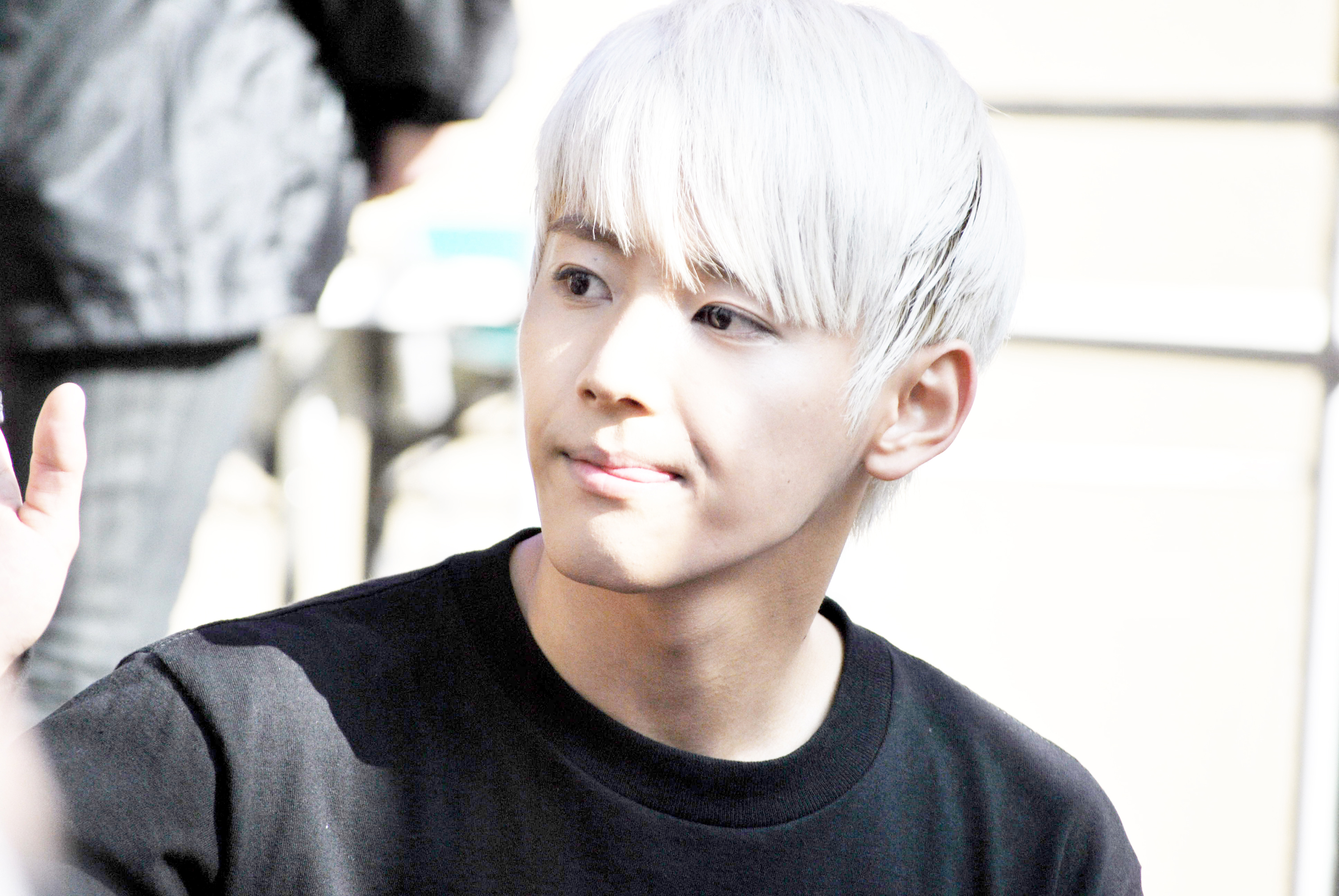
Kim at a release event for Myname's Japanese single "What's Up", November 2012

Prior to his debut as a recording artist, Kim appeared on Seoul Broadcasting System's (SBS) 2009 television series Green Coach. He was also cast in KBS2's drama Believe in Love as Lee Seong-min, a member of a fictional idol group. Kim served as a backup dancer for Hwanhee during performances of the single "Love Pain" and was featured on the album track "I Love You I Love You". He debuted as a rapper in the idol group Myname in 2011. He was a trainee for an accumulated five years and nine months, the longest period among his bandmates. The group released its debut single "Message" on October 28. A Japanese-language version of the song was released the following July, which served as its introductory single in the country. The group was simultaneously active in the music industry of both countries. Beginning in 2015, Myname's promotional activities in South Korea waned.

Kim participated in the 2016 dance competition television series Hit the Stage. He was cast in Power Rangers Dino Force Brave, where he played Kwon Ju-yong, the Brave Red Dino. He went on to compete on the survival competition program The Unit: Idol Rebooting Project along with bandmates Jun.Q, Chaejin, and Gunwoo. It was their first domestic promotional activities in two years. The participants competed to become a member of the all-male unit UNB. Kim advanced into the final round, but did not rank in the upper tier. He released his first solo mini-album Connection in Japan on May 10, 2019. It peaked at number 41 on the country's national Oricon Albums Chart. He was cast in the musical Oh, Mr. Park! (2019) as Hwang Tae-kyeong.

== Discography ==
=== Albums ===
==== Mini-albums ====
Title	Album details	Peak chart positions	Sales
Title	Album details	JPN	Sales
Title	Album details	Oricon	Sales
Japanese
Connection	Released: May 10, 2019; Label: Universal Music Japan; Format: CD, digital download	41	

=== Singles ===
Title	Year	Album
"Connection"	2019	Connection

=== Guest appearances ===
Title	Year	Other performer(s)	Album	Ref.
"I Love You I Love You" (사랑해 사랑해; Saranghae saranghae)	2011	Hwanhee	Hwanhee	

=== Soundtrack appearances ===
Title	Year	Release	Ref.
"Dino Force Brave (Red)" (다이노포스 브레이브 (레드); Dainoposeu beureibeu (redeu))	2017	Power Rangers Dino Force Brave Theme and Sound Track	

== Filmography ==
=== Television series ===
Title	Year	Role	Notes	Ref.
Green Coach	2009			
Believe in Love	2011	Lee Seong-min		
Hit the Stage	2016	Himself	Contestant, episodes 7–8	
Power Rangers Dino Force Brave	2017	Kwon Ju-yong		
The Unit: Idol Rebooting Project	2017–2018	Himself	Contestant	
Kboys	2018	Customer	Episode 4	

=== Theater ===
Title	Year	Role	Ref.
About Thirty	2018		
The Picnic for 30 Days	2019		
Oh, Mr. Park!	2019	Hwang Tae-kyeong	
