= Kang In-soo =

South Korean singer and actor (born 1988)

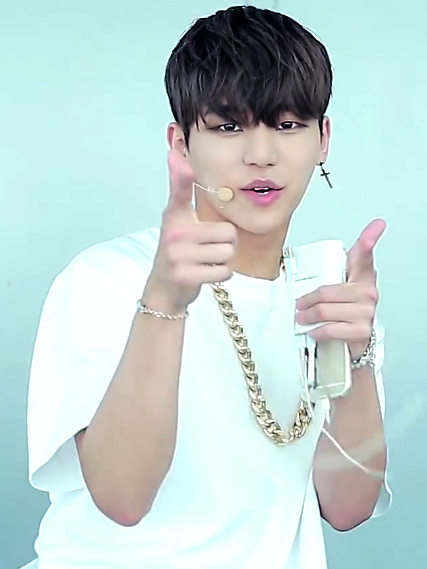
- Kang for Life Theater of Myname, 2015
- Born: March 10, 1988 (age 38); Suwon, South Korea
- Occupations: Singer; actor
- Years active: 2011–present
- Musical career
- Genres: Pop; R&B; dance
- Labels: H2 Media; YM3D; Virgin
- Member of: Myname
- Website: myname-jp.com

Korean name
- Hangul: 강인수
- RR: Gang Insu
- MR: Kang Insu

Kang In-soo (Korean: 강인수; born March 10, 1988) is a South Korean singer and actor. Born in Suwon, Gyeonggi Province, he was an aspiring singer in his adolescence and applied to the Department of Theater and Film in high school, but majored in dance following the denial of his initial application.

Kang signed to H2 Media, where he debuted with boy idol group Myname. He is a vocalist for the quintet. He performed his first acting role in Shinokubo Story (2013) alongside the group. Naked (2017), his first mini-album independent from Myname, was released in Japan in September. He enlisted in the mandatory military service the following month.

== Life and career ==
=== 1988–2010: Early life and career beginnings ===
Kang In-soo was born on March 10, 1988, in Suwon, Gyeonggi Province, South Korea. An aspiring singer, he unsuccessfully applied to Anyang Arts High School under the Department of Theater and Film. He reapplied under the dance program as his second choice and was accepted. He avoided dancing for the first two years, instead taking singing and music lessons. In order to graduate from high school, he was required to conceive a dance piece. A male dance teacher visited the school to aid in the students' production, when Kang "fell in love" with ballet upon seeing the teacher's moves. In addition to ballet, he practiced modern dance during his final year in high school. He passed Sejong University's concours and was admitted as a dance major despite not learning how to dance. He graduated from the institution and, for two years, served as a ballet instructor for rhythmic gymnasts Son Yeon-jae and Shin Soo-ji. He later attended Korea National Open University.

After deliberating between a career in ballet and music, he decided to participate in the second season of the talent television series Superstar K. Following his appearance on the show, he began receiving "love calls" from various entertainment companies, which he rejected for an opportunity to try out for Fly to the Sky's Hwanhee under H2 Media. Upon failing the audition, he sat by a water purifier at the company's entrance and greeted staff for the following seven consecutive days to have them recognize his face. He explained, "I did it because I wanted to show them how eager I was and that I can do it". As a result, he was invited to practice and became a trainee under the label.

=== 2011–present: Career and military service ===
Kang is a vocalist in the idol group Myname. The group released their debut single "Message" in 2011. Kang made his acting debut along with his group in the film Shinokubo Story (2013), where he played one of five characters seeking to become "stars". He released his first solo mini-album Naked in Japan on September 6, 2017. Kang's musical style was influenced by Big Bang's Taeyang, JYJ's Kim Junsu, Chris Brown and Usher. He held a release event at the Tower Records store in Shibuya the day before Naked's release, drawing in 400 attendees. The mini-album ranked at number 19 on Japan's national Oricon Albums Chart, selling 3,346 copies in its first week. Kang held two solo concerts in late September to promote Naked.

Kang enlisted in military service on October 26, 2017. He received military training at the Korea Army Training Center in Nonsan, South Chungcheong Province.

== Musical style ==
Kang's debut solo mini-album Naked encompasses ballads, R&B, dance, and rock music. Its lead single "Naked Love" is an EDM track. Kang has cited Hwanhee and American singer Usher as role models.

== Discography ==
=== Albums ===
==== Mini-albums ====
Title	Album details	Peak chart positions		Sales
Title	Album details	JPN		Sales
Title	Album details	Oricon	Billboard	Sales
Japanese
Naked	Released: September 6, 2017; Label: Universal Music Japan; Format: CD, digital download	19	20	JPN: 3,346

=== Singles ===
Title	Year	Peak chart positions	Sales	Album
Title	Year	Billboard JPN	Sales	Album
Japanese
"Naked Love"	2017	—		Naked

=== Soundtrack appearances ===
Title	Year	Release	Ref.
"Wish for You" (with Lee Sang)	2020	Wish You OST	
"Wish for You (Acoustic Ver.)"	2020	Wish You OST	
"Close to You (Acoustic Ver.)" (너에게 더 가까이; Neoege deo gakkai)	2020	Wish You OST	
"Without You"	2021	Nobleman Ryu's Wedding OST	
"CuzLove" (사랑을 해서; Sarangeul haeseo)	2021	Start Dating OST Part. 6	

== Filmography ==
=== Television show ===
Year	Title	Role	Ref.
2010	Superstar K 2	Contestant	
2020	Handsome Tigers	Cast member	

=== Television series ===
Year	Title	Role	Ref.
2020	Wish You: Your Melody From My Heart	Kang In-soo	
2021	Nobleman Ryu's wedding	Ryu Ho-seon	
2021	Starting Point of Dating	Gye Han-sol	

== Theater ==
Year	English title	Korean title	Role	Ref.
2021	Navilera	나빌레라	Chae rock	
2022	The NOW	The NOW	Kim Soo-hoon	
