= Kim So-jung (singer) =

South Korean singer (born 1989)

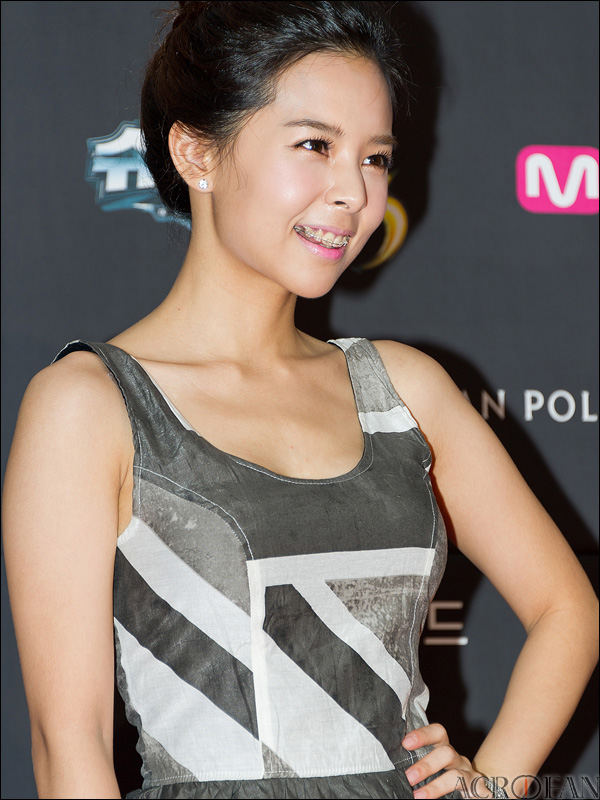

Background information
- Born: June 2, 1989 (age 36)
- Origin: South Korea
- Genres: K-pop, R&B
- Occupation: Singer
- Years active: 2010-present

Kim So-jung (Korean: 김소정; born June 2, 1989) is a South Korean singer. She is known as a finalist (Top 11) of Mnet's Superstar K2. She is one of the few in the industry who did not follow the trainee-debut system. She released her first EP, Herrah's on May 21, 2012.

== Profile ==
She was still a student of KAIST when she participated in Superstar K2. She was on leave from studying due to the show but she resumed her student life in 2011 September and has graduated with a degree in data processing.

== Discography ==
=== Singles ===
Title	Year	Peak chart positions	Album
Title	Year	KOR	Album
"Forgotten Memories" (추억이 버려지다) (with H-Eugene)	2011	90	New Story Part.3
"Sweat or Tears" (땀인지 눈물인지)	2012	— (Note: "Sweat or Tears" did not enter the Circle Digital Chart, but it peaked at number 92 on the component Download Chart.)	Herrah's (digital single album)
"Blap"	2012	—	Non-album singles
"Beautiful Love"	2013	—	Non-album singles
"You, Then You" (그대, 그때 그대) (with Huh Gong)	2013	—	Non-album singles
"Dance Music"	2015	—	Non-album singles
"I Need Romance" (로맨스가 필요해) (with 1sagain)	2016	—	Non-album singles

=== Soundtrack appearances ===
Title	Year	Peak chart positions	Album
Title	Year	KOR	Album
"Palpitations" (두근두근) (with Park Bo-ram and Lee Bo-ram)	2010	77	Playful Kiss OST
"Love Is" (with Kim Hyung-jun)	2010	—	Cafe-In OST
"You Came" (그대가 왔죠)	2012	—	Queen and I OST
"Just a Little, Just a Moment" (조금이라도 잠깐이라도)	2014	—	Shining Romance OST

== Filmography ==
=== TV series ===
Date	Title	Role	Network
2010	Superstar K2	Herself	Mnet

=== Variety Shows ===
Year	Title	Network	Notes
2013	Let's Go Dream Team! Season 2	KBS	Episode 166, 170, 174, 192, 193, 198, 207, 223, 227, 311
2014	MBC Idol Dance Battle D-Style	MBC Music	appeared as a competitor
2015	Cool Kiz On The Block	KBS	Episode 121
