= GI (group) =

South Korean girl group

Global Icon (GI)
- Origin: Seoul, South Korea
- Genre: K-pop
- Years active: 2013–2016, 2023-Present
- Label: Simtong Entertainment (South Korea)
- Members: AI (Nayeon); Lili; Hyena; Yebin
- Past members: Jiamin; Dokyung; OneKet; Aram; HaYun; EunJi; Heeso

Global Icon (Korean: 지아이; acronym: GI) is a South Korean girl group formed by Simtong Entertainment in 2013. They released their debut single "Beatles" on April 3, 2013. The group originally debuted with a "boyish" concept, referring to the fact that the majority of the members had short hair and a more masculine attitude and style, opposed to the feminine concepts many Korean pop girl groups have, but after their line-up changes, the group returned in 2015 with a feminine and sexy concept.

As of October 8, 2023, Global Icon has returned with Ai and three new members, Lili, Hyena and Yebin.

== History ==
=== 2013: Debut, Comeback, and "Don't Lie" controversy ===
The group was announced on March 20, 2013, and image teasers were released revealing the members of the group. It was revealed that they would take on a fresh concept from that of the usual girl group:

We’re going to be different from the cute and sexy girl groups that come out almost once every week with our music and style. You can look forward to them.

Following this, a music video teaser revealed the rappers, OneKet and AI, followed by a video for singers Eunji, Hayun and Aram, and a full group music video teaser. The group released their debut single "Beatles" on April 3, 2013 along with its music video. They debuted on Show Champion the same day.

On July 1, 2013, Sim Tong Entertainment released album jacket photos for their upcoming 2nd digital single, "Because of You". "Because of You" was supposed to be released on the 3rd of July (with the release of Global Icon's first mini album to be later on in August), but the single was delayed to August 30 due to scheduling issues, and the mini album to September 3.

The group were also chosen to become models for "94Street", a Korean restaurant. This drew some criticism from fans, as the CF features the members dressed in fancy dresses, something which many took to mean that the group was straying from their original "boyish" concept.

The group announced that they would be returning in October of that year with the song "Don't Lie", but the song was deemed "unfit for terrestrial broadcast" by all the major networks, and they were forced to go with "Giyeuk" as their comeback single instead.

=== 2014–2015: Lineup Changes and Comeback ===
On June 25, 2014, it was announced by GI International Fanclub that Aram had decided to leave the group. This came after around two months of silence from Aram's social media accounts, right after coming back from promotion in Japan. Representative of SimTong Entertainment initially said to GI International Fanclub that "Aram's withdrawal from GI and our agency is under discussion", but then revealed that "GI will stay as a 5-member group and instead of Aram, a new member will be added in her place." It was also announced that GI was preparing for a comeback with the new member, and she would more than likely be taking over Aram's position as the main vocalist. Member Hayun uploaded a photo on Twitter on June 19 showing the girls practicing, including a shot of two unknown girls, who fans presumed to be the new members, although they were met with strong criticism when fans noticed that they were lip-syncing during live performances.

On November 14, 2014 it was revealed through the group's official page that Hayun had also left the group (in August of that year), leaving the group's future in doubt, although it was announced in January 2015 that the group would release a new song in that year.

On February 24, 2015, AlphaBat's Delta made a post on his Instagram account declaring that G.I. would release their third single on February 25. The next day, G.I. member OneKet was revealed to have filed a contract termination lawsuit against Simtong Entertainment citing poor management, and Simtong responded with the claim that OneKet and Aram had breached their contracts.

On June 29, SimTong Entertainment dropped individual videos to introduce the three new members: Do Kyung, Ji A-min & Hee So. The group came back with the new lineup on September 2, surprising fans due to their premature change from the "tomboyish" concept that the group were known and praised for to a far more feminine concept for their 'Doligo Doligo' MV. Neither the music video nor the song was well received, with reviewers saying the imagery of the video was "risible, inappropriate [and] tasteless".

=== 2016–2023: Lineup Changes, Disbandment and Activities Post-Disbandment ===
On March 28, Eunji announced her departure from the group via a tweet that said: "Everyone who loved and supported GI, thank you so much, sincerely... I was so happy. I'll come back with a new look. Goodbye for just a little." At the same time, Dokyung deleted all her tweets, leading to speculation that the group had disbanded.

In May 2016, Heeso redebuted in the girl group AGirls. The group unofficially disbanded soon after, and in August 2016, she joined HEXE for their "Fallin' Fallin'" comeback under the stage name "Jin". She later redebuted as the leader of Various in 2017, and was a member until their disbandment in 2018. In 2020 it was revealed she would be redebuting as a member of BLASTAR (using the stage name "Jinsil") on July 31. She was also a backup dancer for Blackpink's Jennie in "Solo", and choreographed PinkFantasy's "Fantasy" and "Playing House".

On April 12, 2017, Dokyung redebuted in the girl group L.U.X. Following the group's disbandment, she joined the duo Musky (using the stage name Han).

As of 2020, AI has started a dance school called Rotiple Dance Studio, and changed her name to Kim Nayeon.

=== 2023-Present: Comeback ===
On October 8, 2023, it was revealed that Global Icon is returning with original member AI and three new members: Lili, Yebin and Hyena. According to news reports, AI had obtained permission from SimTong to use the Global Icon name and revive the group. GI is planning to release new music in early 2024.

== Current members ==
- AI (아이) (2013-2016, 2023–Present)
- Lili (아이) (2023–Present)
- Yebin (예빈) (2023–Present)
- Hyena (혜나) (2023–Present)

== Former members ==
- OneKet (원캣) (2013-2015)
- Aram (아람) (2013-2014)
- Hayeon (하연) (2013-2014)
- Eunji (은지) (2013-2016)
- Jiamin (지아민) (2015-2016)
- Heeso (희소) (2015-2016)
- Dokyung (도경) (2015-2016)

== Discography ==
=== Extended plays ===
Title	Album details	Peak chart positions	Sales
Title	Album details	KOR	Sales
Tremendous	Released: September 3, 2013; Label: Simtong Entertainment; Format: CD, digital download	21	KOR: 756+

=== Singles ===
Year	Album information	Peak chart positions	Track listing	Sales
Year	Album information	KOR	Track listing	Sales
2013	"Beatles": Released: April 3, 2013; Language: Korean; Length: 06:42; Label: Simtong Entertainment; Format: CD, digital download	158	1. Beatles; 2. Beatles (BeatBurger Remix)	10,561 (digital)
2013	"Because of You": Released: August 30, 2013; Language: Korean; Length: 03:53; Label: Simtong Entertainment; Format: CD, digital download	—N/a	1. Because of You	—N/a
2015	"Echo": Released: February 25, 2015; Language: Korean; Length: 03:53; Label: Simtong Entertainment; Format: CD, digital download	—N/a	1. Echo; 2. This Much	—N/a
2015	"DoliGo DoliGo": Released: September 2, 2015; Language: Korean; Length: 03:01; Label: Simtong Entertainment; Format: CD, digital download	—N/a	1. DoliGo DoliGo; 2. DoliGo DoliGo (instrumental)	—N/a
