= Lee Gun-woo =

South Korean singer and actor (born 1989)

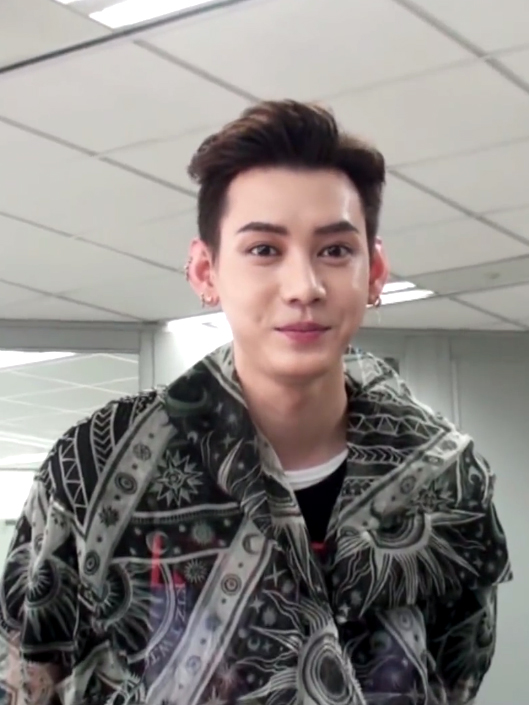
- Lee for the Life Theater of Myname, 2015
- Born: January 30, 1989 (age 37); Daejeon, South Korea
- Occupations: Singer; songwriter; actor
- Years active: 2011–present
- Musical career
- Genres: Pop; R&B; dance
- Labels: H2 Media; YM3D; Virgin
- Website: myname-jp.com

Korean name
- Hangul: 이건우
- RR: I Geonu
- MR: I Kŏnu

Lee Gun-woo (Korean: 이건우; born January 30, 1989) is a South Korean singer and actor. Initially studying sports, he decided to become a singer at the age of 20 and moved to Seoul to pursue that career.

Lee signed to H2 Media, where he debuted with boy group Myname. An idol, he serves as the leader and main vocalist for the quintet. He made his first acting role in Shinokubo Story (2013) alongside the group. I Am 27 (2016), his first studio album independent from Myname, was released in Japan in January.

== Life and career ==
=== 1989–2010: Early life and career beginnings ===
Lee Gun-woo was born on January 30, 1989, the second child and first son in the family. He played soccer in middle school, and attended Woosong University to study sports. He owned a fashion shop in Apgujeong-dong after taking interest in the field. He decided to pursue a career in singing at the age of 20, which his parents and friends vehemently opposed. He moved to Seoul from Daejeon to become a singer. He auditioned for H2 Media singing Kang Min-kyung's "Go to the Hospital" and dancing to G-Dragon's "Heartbreaker", and he was immediately accepted as a trainee.

=== 2011–present: Career ===
Lee is a member of Myname, where he serves as the leader and main vocalist. In 2011, the group released its debut single "Message". He began learning about songwriting during this time period. He made his acting debut along with his group in the film Shinokubo Story (2013), where he played one of five characters seeking to become "stars". He released his first studio album I Am 27 in Japan on January 30, 2016. Consisting of ten tracks, eight were self-produced by Lee, with the remaining two being cover songs. He held a release event at the Tower Records store in Shibuya the day after its release, drawing in 350 attendees. The album ranked at number 39 on the country's national Oricon Albums Chart. It charted for three weeks and sold 3,851 units domestically by the end of its run. Lee held the Gun-woo First Showcase Live on February 28 in order to promote I Am 27.

== Musical style ==
Lee has cited Hwanhee and Brown Eyed Soul's Na-ul as role models.

== Discography ==
=== Albums ===
==== Studio albums ====
| Title | Album details | Peak chart positions | | Sales |
| Title | Album details | JPN | | Sales |
| Title | Album details | Oricon | Billboard | Sales |
Japanese
| I Am 27 | Released: January 30, 2016; Label: YM3D; Format: CD, digital download | 39 | 75 | JPN: 3,851 |

=== Singles ===
| Title | Year | Peak chart positions | Sales | Album |
| Title | Year | Billboard JPN | Sales | Album |
Japanese
| "I Am 27" | 2016 | — | | I Am 27 |

== Filmography ==
- Shinokubo Story (2013)
