= KCON =

Annual international convention

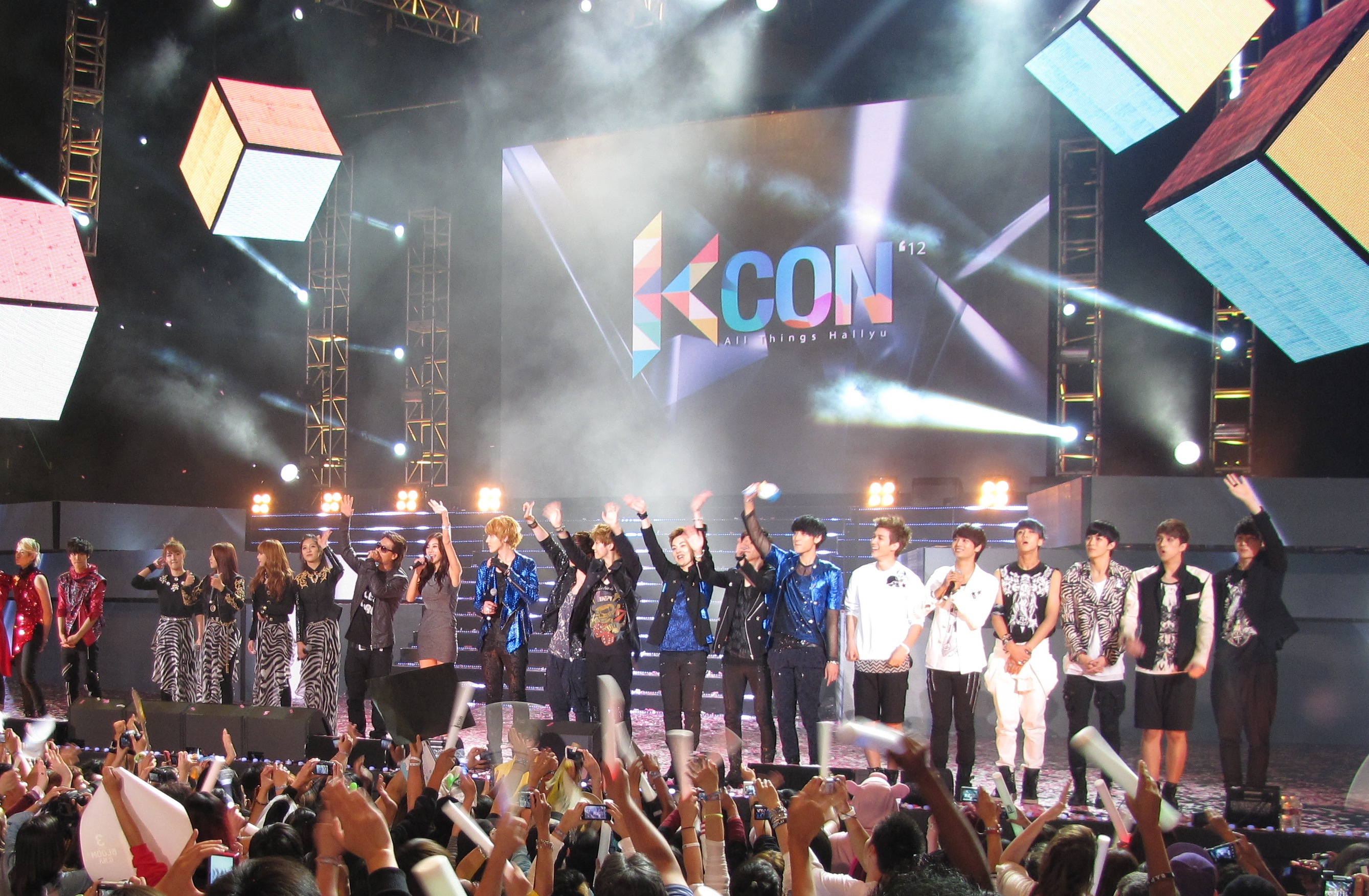
- Artists on stage at KCON 2012
- Genre: Korean pop
- Locations: United States: Irvine, California; Los Angeles, California; San Francisco, California; Chicago, Illinois; Atlanta, Georgia; Minneapolis, Minnesota; Newark, New Jersey; New York, New York; Dallas, Texas; Houston, Texas; Other countries: Sydney, Australia; Chiba, Japan; Saitama, Japan; Tokyo, Japan; Paris, France; Frankfurt, Germany; Rome, Italy; Mexico City, Mexico; Riyadh, Saudi Arabia; Jeju, South Korea; Madrid, Spain; Barcelona, Spain; Bangkok, Thailand; Abu Dhabi, United Arab Emirates; Hong Kong, China
- Inaugurated: 2012
- Founders: Koreaboo; CJ ENM Entertainment Division
- Organizer: CJ ENM America; Powerhouse Live (2015–2019)
- Website: KCON; KCON USA; KCON JAPAN

KCON is an annual convention held in locations across the world, created by Koreaboo and organized by CJ ENM Entertainment Division. It was first held in Southern California in 2012 and has since expanded to ten countries as of 2022.

In 2015, KCON expanded to Japan and then quickly announced the first KCON USA on the East Coast. In 2016, KCON expanded into Abu Dhabi, United Arab Emirates and Paris, France. In January 2017, KCON announced that they would be hosting their first KCON Mexico at the Mexico City Arena on March 17 and 18, 2017.

An online replacement of KCON due to the COVID-19 pandemic, titled KCON:TACT, started on June 20 until June 26, 2020 via YouTube, AIS Play, and Shopee. The second season started on October 16, 2020 and ended on October 25, 2020. The third and final season started March 20, 2021.

== Background ==
KCON was first created by Koreaboo in 2012, after a partnership with CJ E&M's US-based subsidiary, Mnet America. It was produced by Powerhouse Live, who have continued to work on KCON from 2013 to the present. KCON's initial aim was to establish an annual flagship event that would improve the experiences of American fans by providing them with an affordable way to connect with each other as well as with artists and professionals from the K-pop music industry. During KCON '12, Mnet Media's Ted Kim was interviewed by journalist Michael Holmes from CNN to discuss the rise of K-Pop in the United States.

On June 21, 2016, Euny Hong reported in the Wall Street Journal that the North American KCONs, although very popular, were only a break-even financially. CJ E&M's American CEO Angela Killoren said they are more interested in the long-term goal of raising Korea's brand value than short-term gain. Also, in a June press conference, Shin Hyung-kwan, president of CJ E&M's Mnet contents business, said, "KCON, which has been held in Abu Dhabi in March, Japan in April, and Paris early this month, is not just about making money. Numbers are important but what matters more is the potential created by the event for the next five, 10 and 20 years." Shin added that the company goals were increasing the growth of products and services to the global market by expanding partnerships with Korean small and medium enterprises.

== History ==
=== 2012 ===
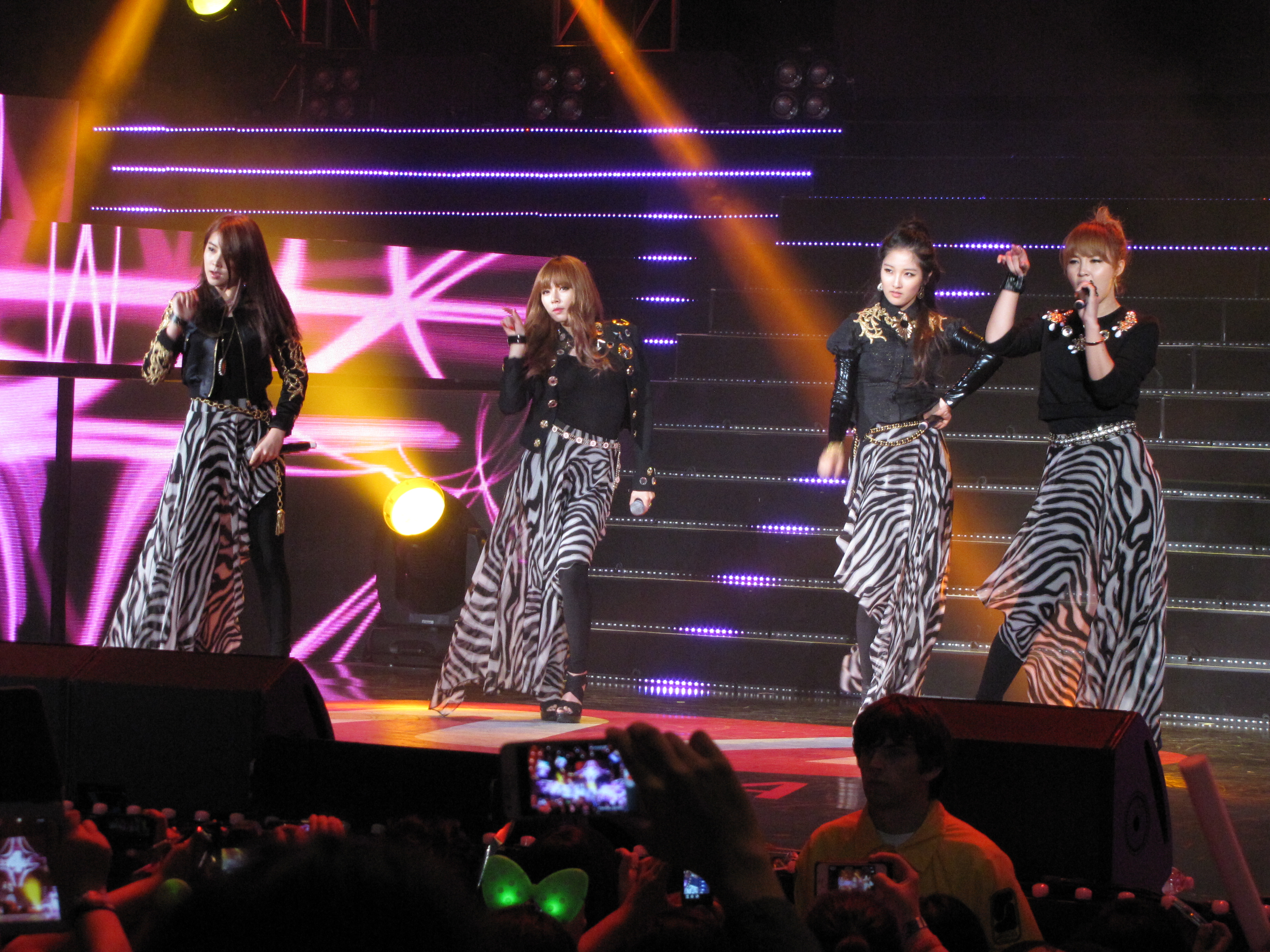
4Minute at KCON '12

KCON '12 was held on October 13 at the Verizon Wireless Amphitheatre in Irvine, California. Music artists invited to perform include 4Minute, B.A.P, Exo-M, Nu'est, VIXX, and G.NA. Jeff Yang of The Wall Street Journal reported that KCON '12 attracted over 10,000 people.

=== 2013 ===
KCON '13 was held from August 24 to 25 at the Los Angeles Memorial Sports Arena. The lineup included K-pop artists Exo (K & M), 2AM, Teen Top, f(x), G-Dragon, Crayon Pop, Dynamic Duo, Yu Seung Woo and DJ Koo. It also included rapper Missy Elliott, who is featured on one of G-Dragon's singles. Super Junior-M's Henry Lau performed and spoke at a panel.

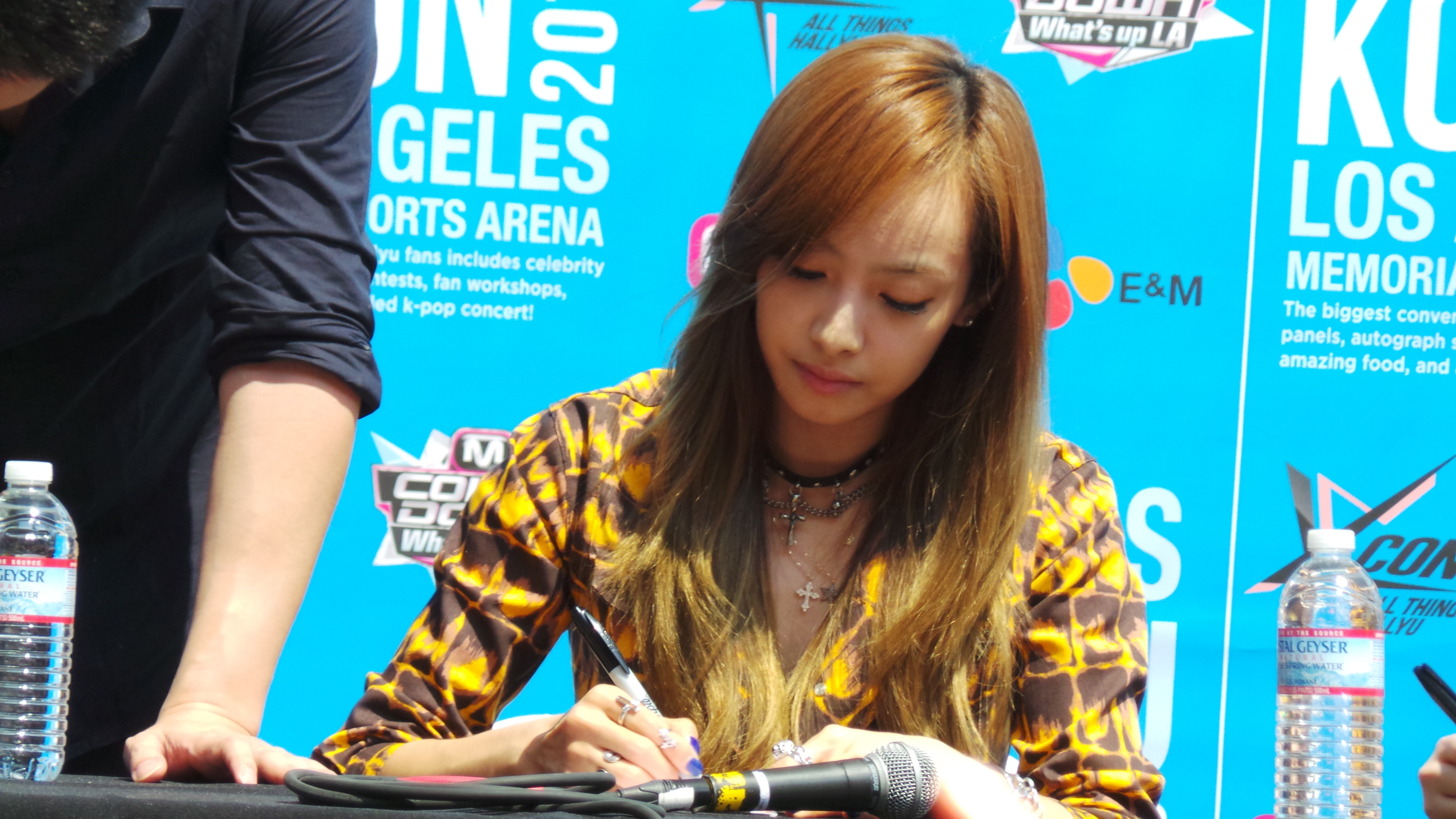
Victoria

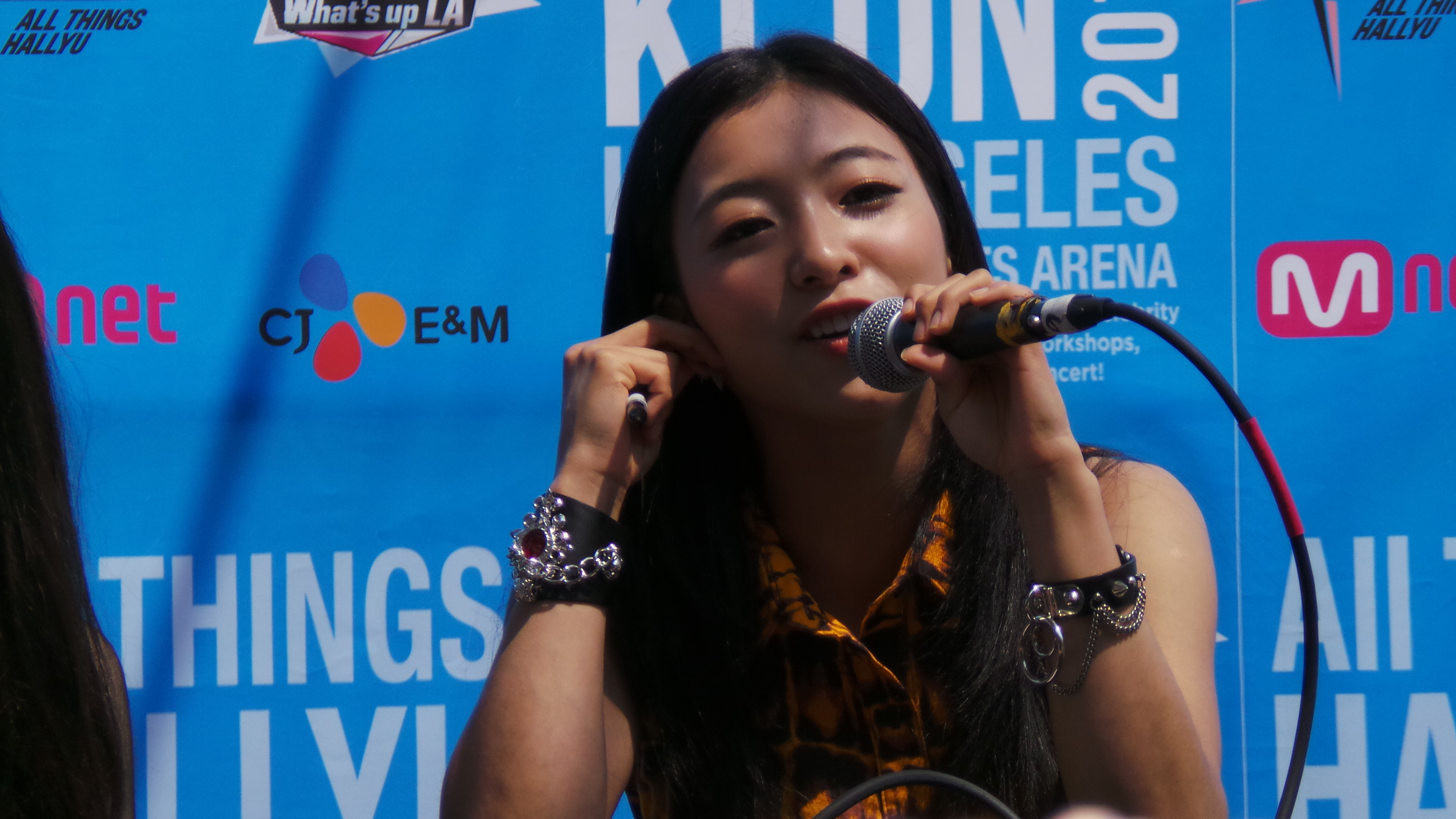
Luna

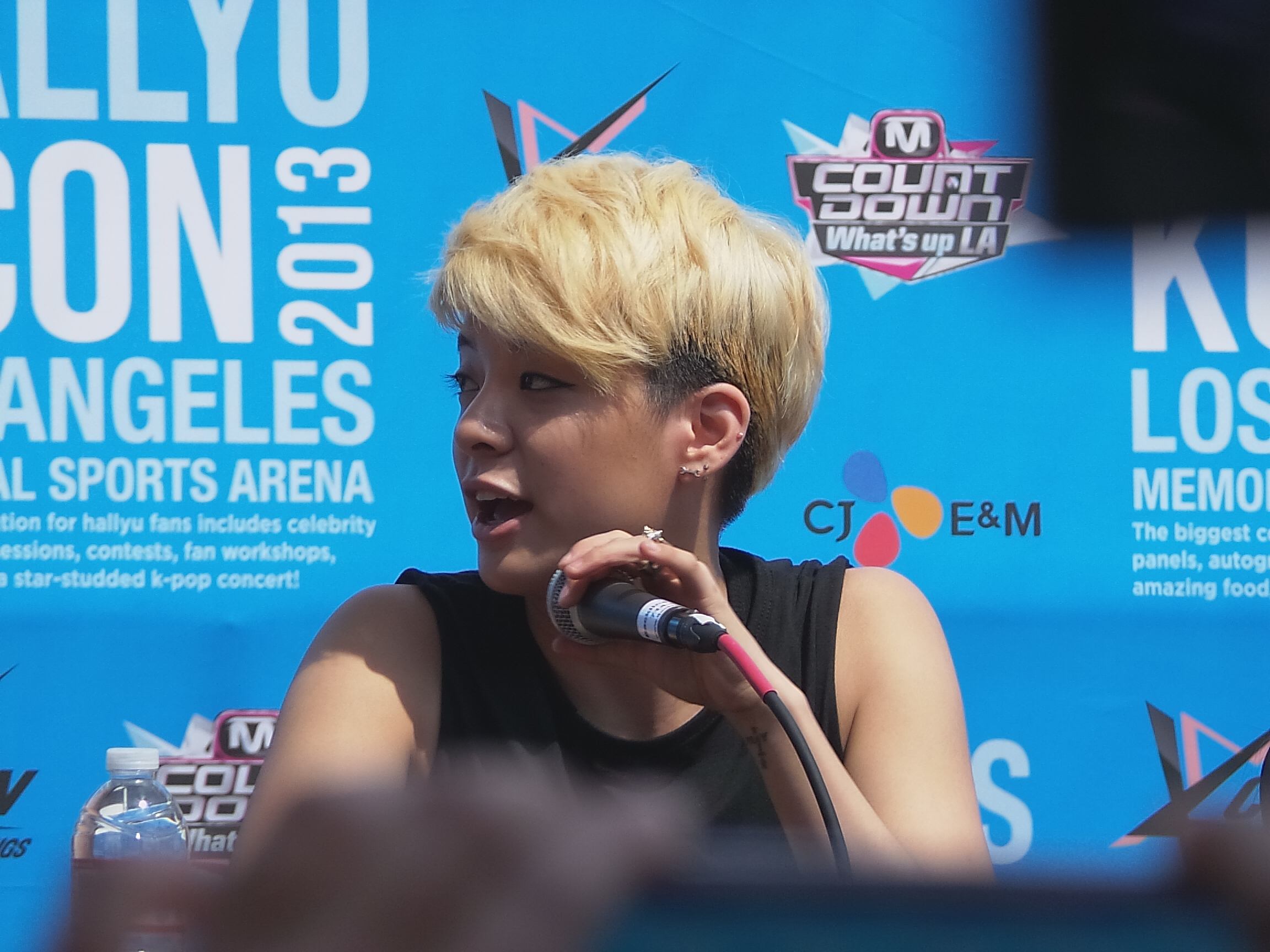
Amber

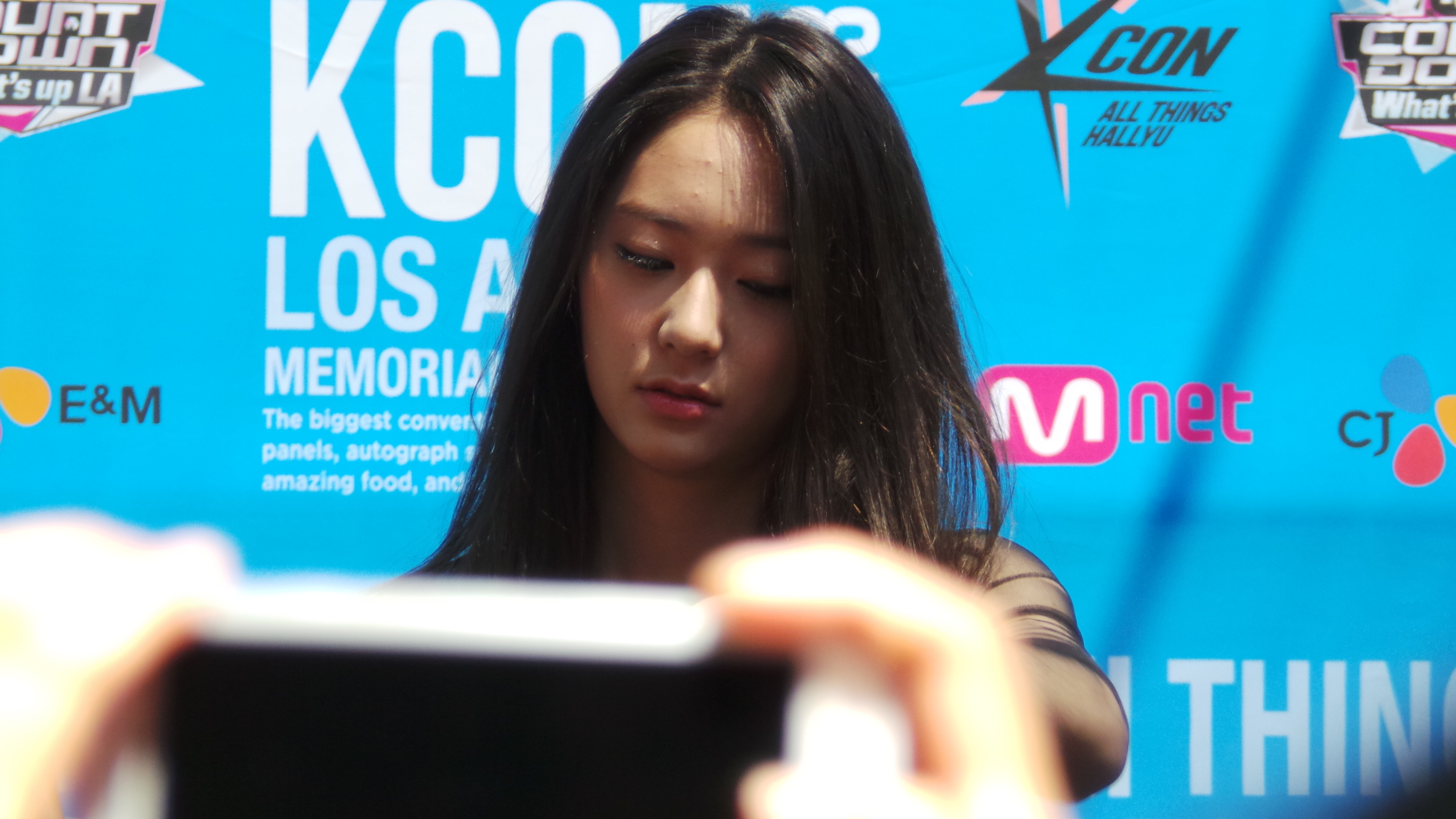
Krystal

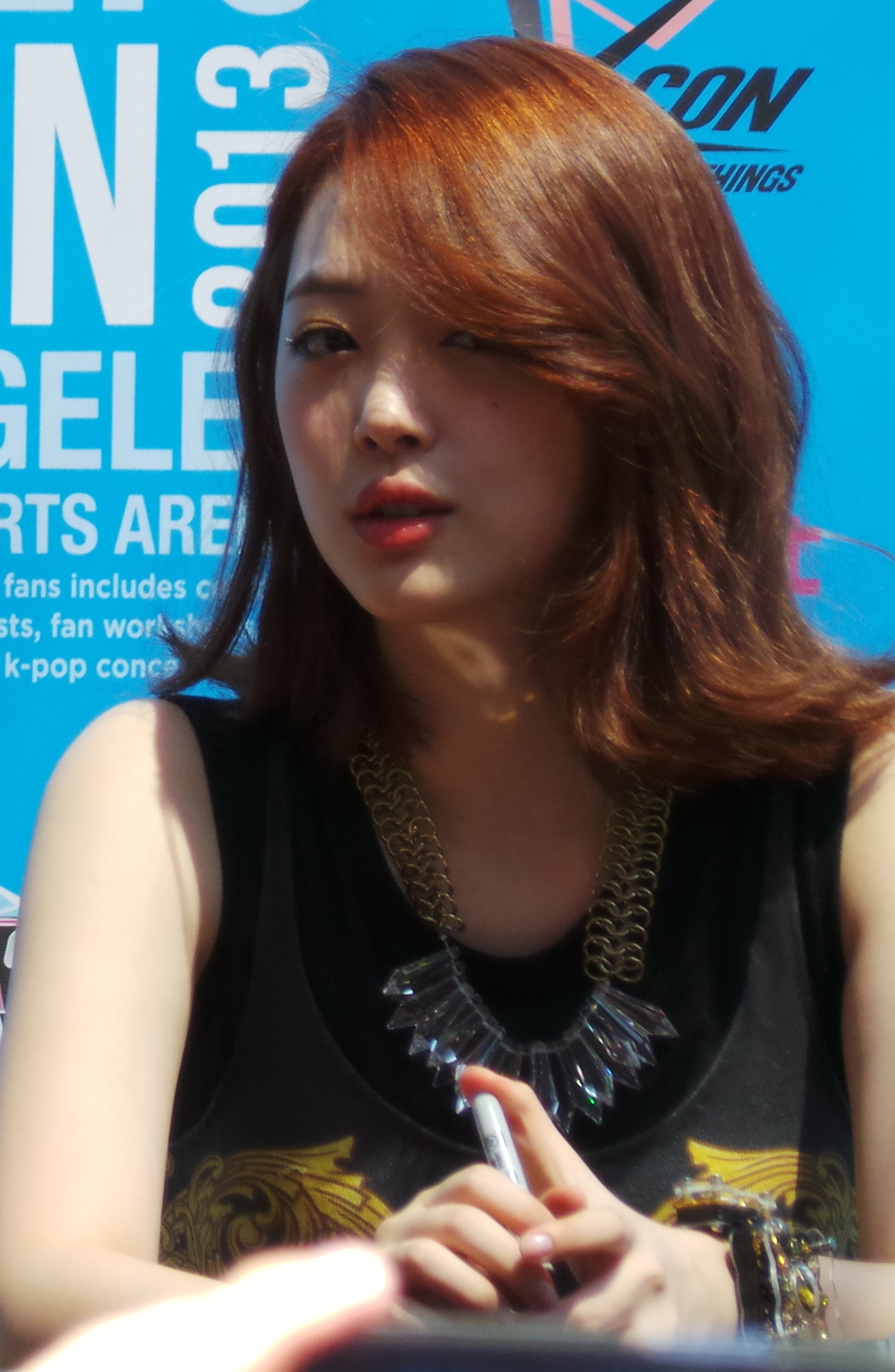
Sulli

f(x) KCON '13

=== 2014 ===
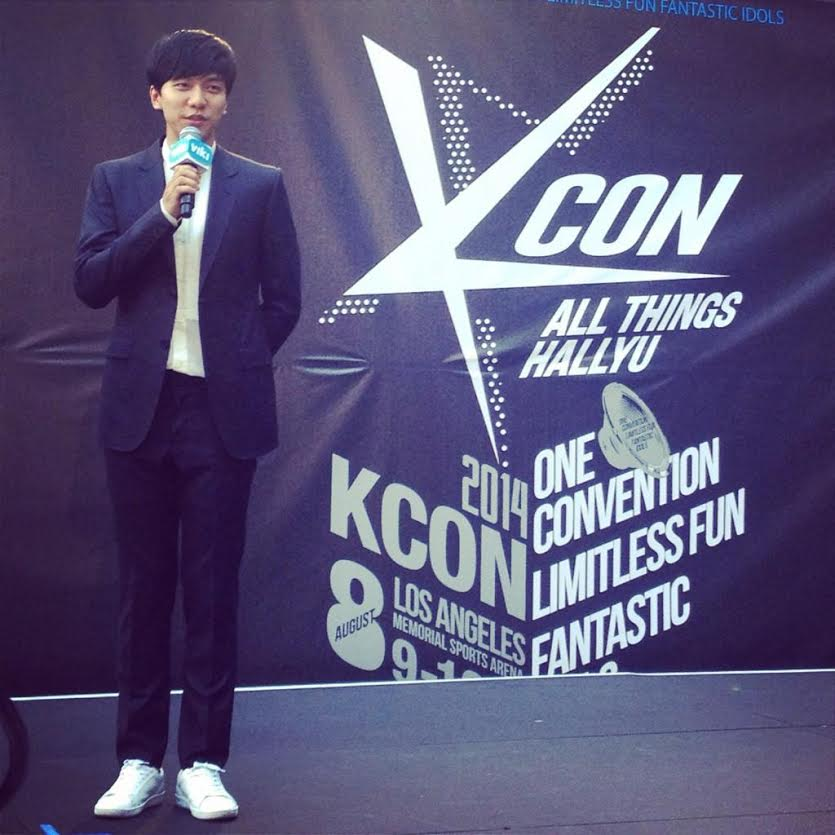
Lee Seung-gi 2014 red carpet

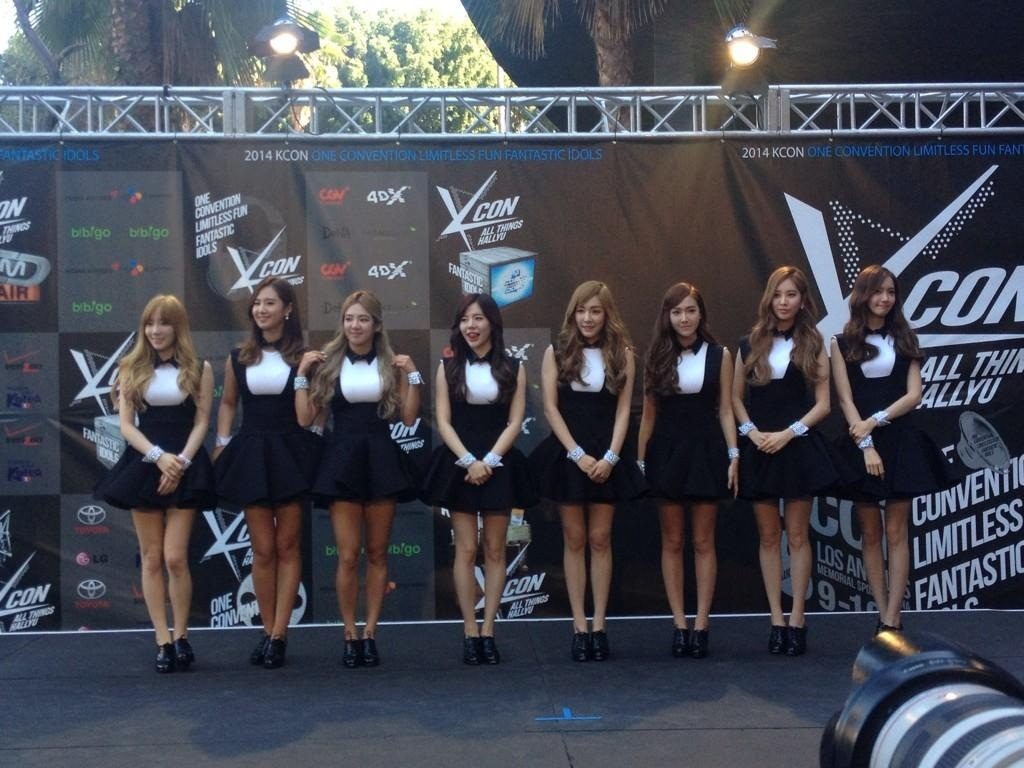
Girls' Generation 2014 red carpet

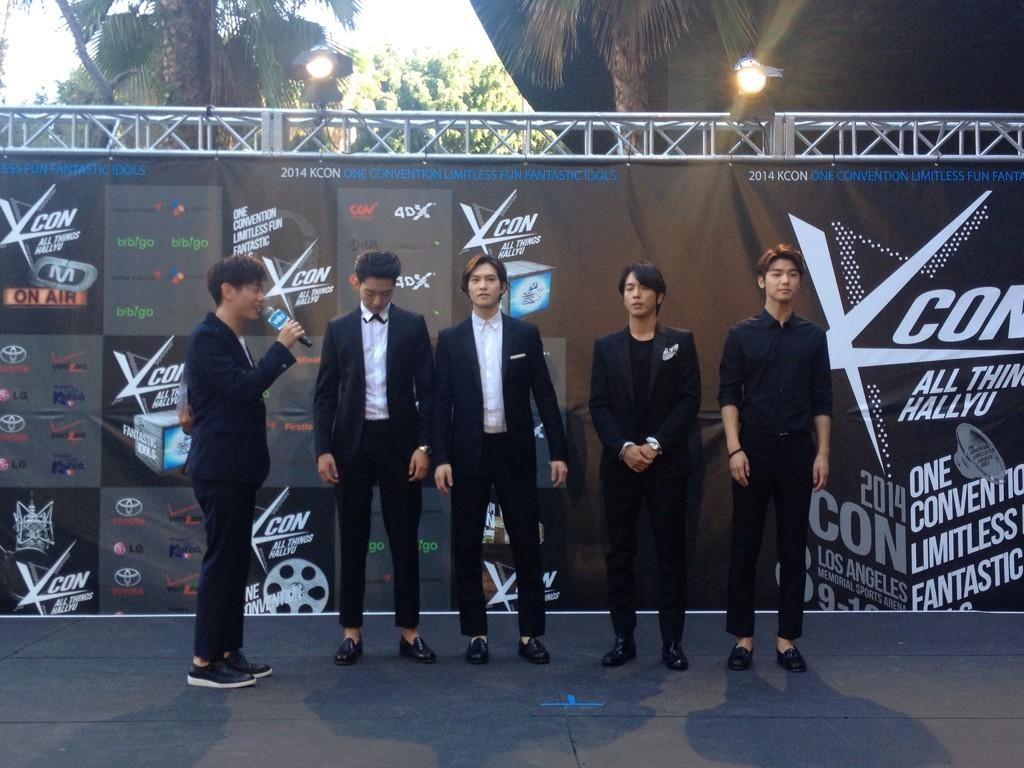
Host Eric Nam with CNBLUE 2014

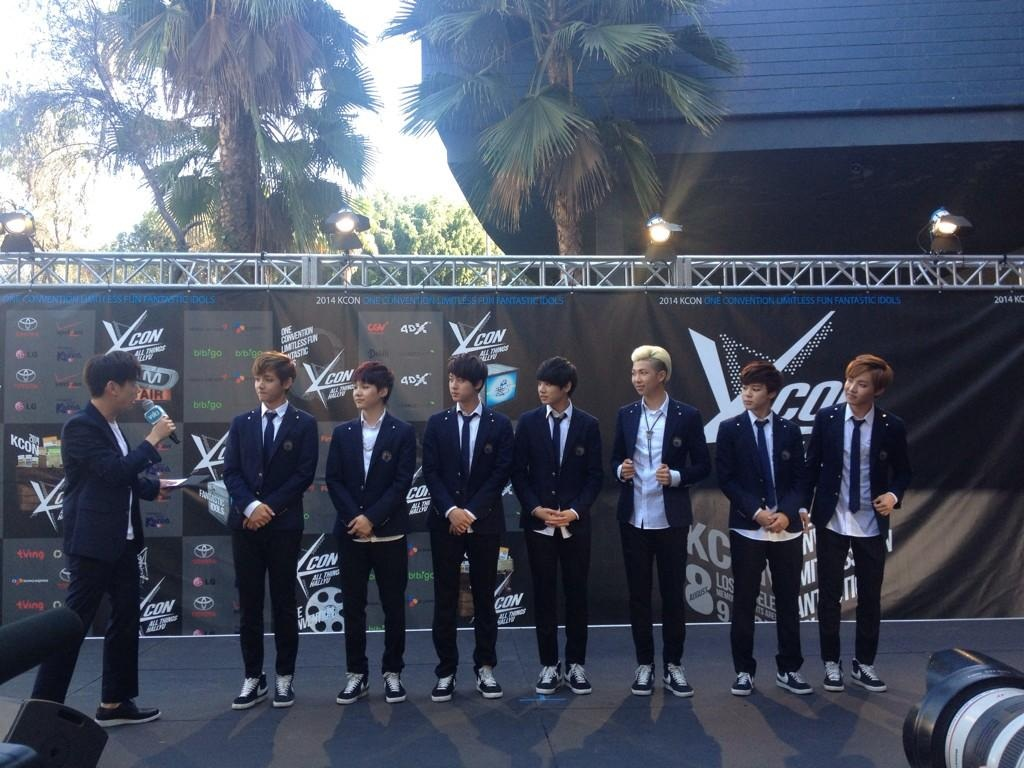
Host Eric Nam with BTS 2014

KCON '14 was held on August 9–10, returning for a second year to Los Angeles Memorial Sports Arena. The artist lineup included B1A4, BTS, CNBLUE, G-Dragon, Girls' Generation, IU, Jung Joon-young, Spica, Teen Top, and VIXX. Featured guests included Lee Seung-gi, Lee Seo-jin, Yoo In-na, Nam Gyu-ri, Kim Ji-seok; and Eric Nam, who hosted red carpet interviews, filmed by Viki.DramaFever documented the red carpet, explaining the missing Girls' Generation 9th member, Sooyoung, who was filming a drama.NBC News interviewed Billboard K-Town columnist Jeff Benjamin, journalist-author Euny Hong, and Girls' Generation's Seohyun and Tiffany to answer "what is K-pop"." In response to Fusion TV, KCON co-project manager Angela Killoren said, "There's still this sense that, I'm the fan, and I'm the only fan, or I'm one of very few, and these are my artists, you have this incredible sense of – you discovered them, and you own them."

The two nightly concerts were shown on the weekly K-pop cable television show M Countdown. "2 Nights in LA" was broadcast on Mnet America in the U.S. and in multiple countries. Danny Im of Mnet America's show "Danny From LA" hosted the concerts, along with "DFLA" co-host Dumbfoundead, Jung Joon-young, Tiffany, and opener Lee Seung-gi."DFLA", in its third season, filmed a live taping of the show at the convention.

For this year's event, Mnet America started a new web-series, "KCON EXPERIENCE 2014", with multiple episodes, including footage of the stars' arrival at the airport in Los Angeles, backstage activities, and the weekend's panels, fan meetings, food stands. The convention included an outdoor marketplace, food truck alley, a mini 4DX theatre, and open stage area; with panels and workshops about music, k-dramas, e-sports, choreography styles, makeup, hair trends; and as billed, "all things Hallyu". Korean gaming channel OnGameNet (OGN) also organized a "League of Legends Champion Festival", an event involving Korean team CJ Entus Frost and American team Cloud 9.

The convention doubled attendance from the previous year, with 42,000 attending. Of those 42,000, nearly 40 percent come from outside California, most were female, and less than 10 percent were Korean.

=== 2015 ===
By the end of August, KCON '15's total attendance for the U.S. and Japan was 90,000. L.A.'s three day events had 58,000 attendees, and the two concerts at the Staples Center resulted in a sold-out crowd of 28,000 fans and Gross Sales of $2,055,800. Newark's total was 17,000, and Saitama's was 15,000.

In November, yearly attendance totals grew to 107,000 with the addition of the Jeju dates. Approximately 17,000 people attended the events in Jeju.

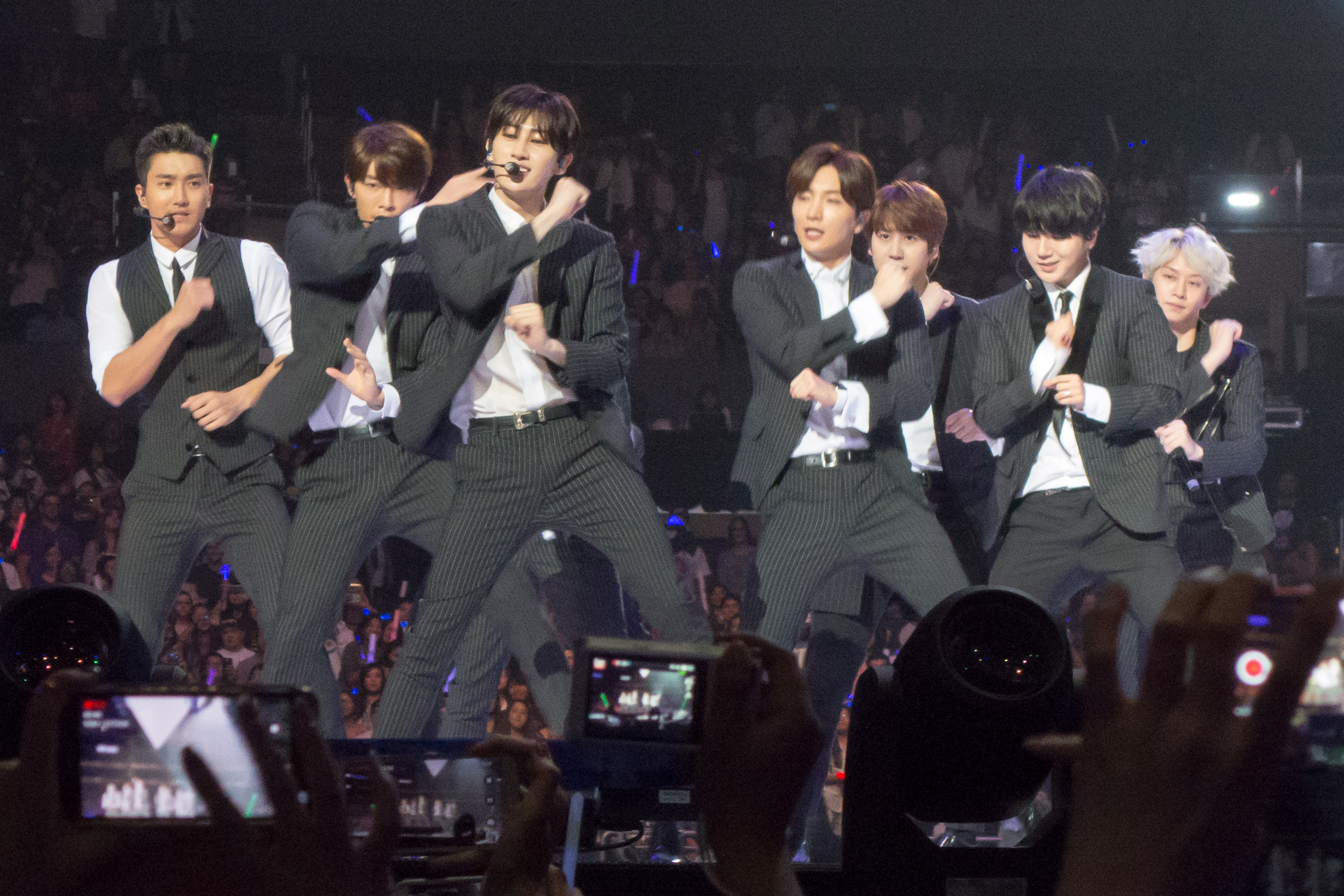
Super Junior 2015 L.A.

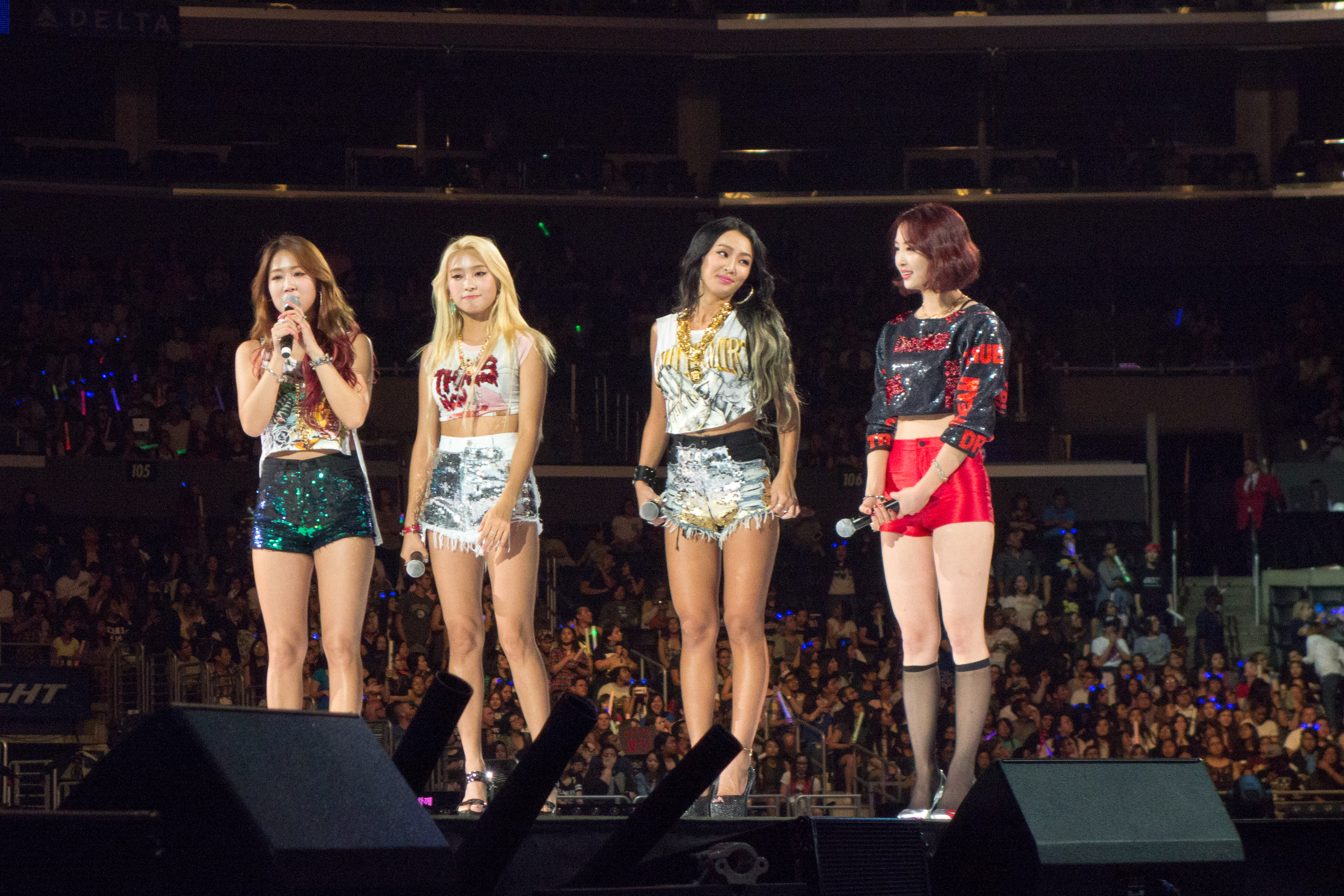
Sistar 2015 L.A.

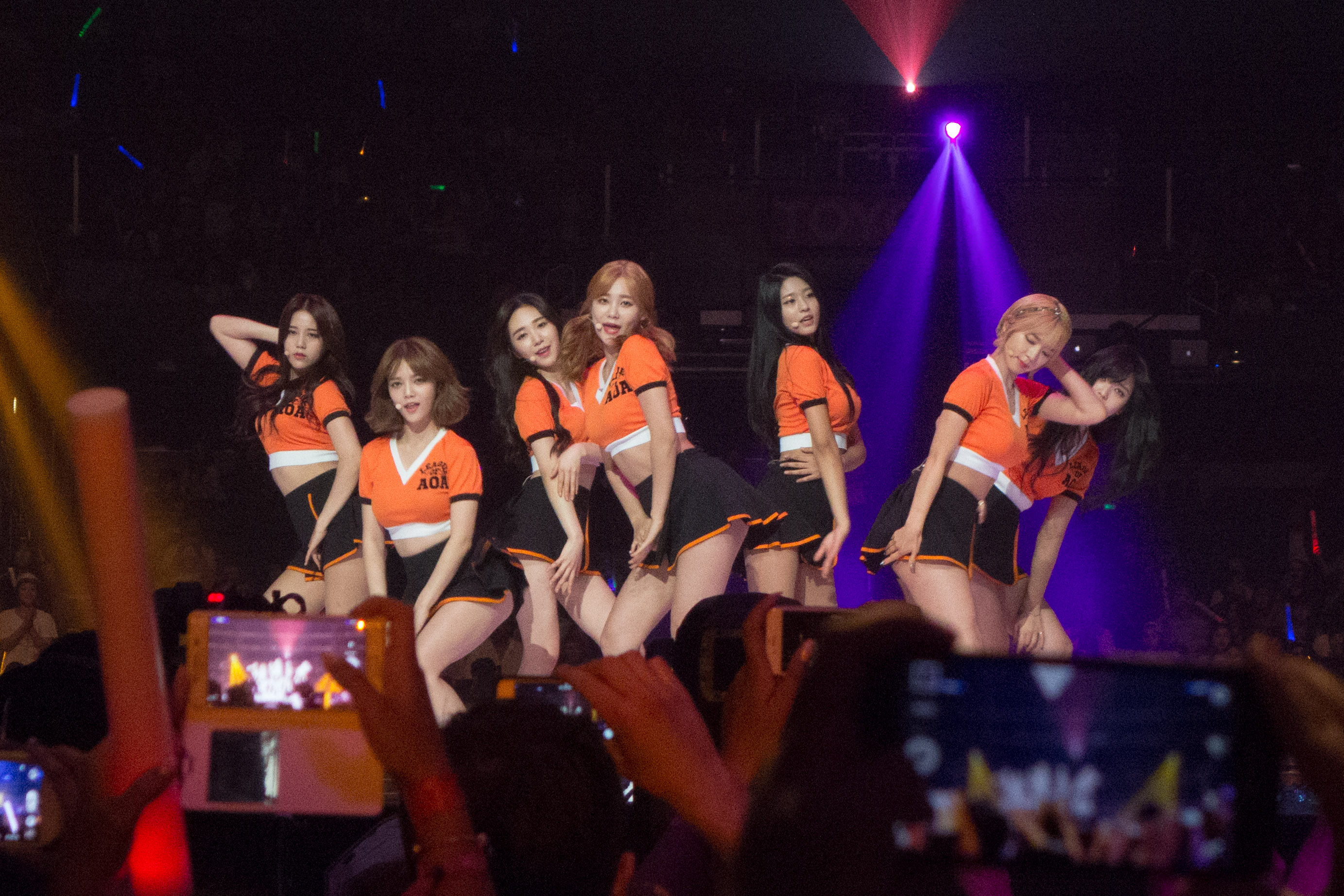
AOA 2015 L.A.

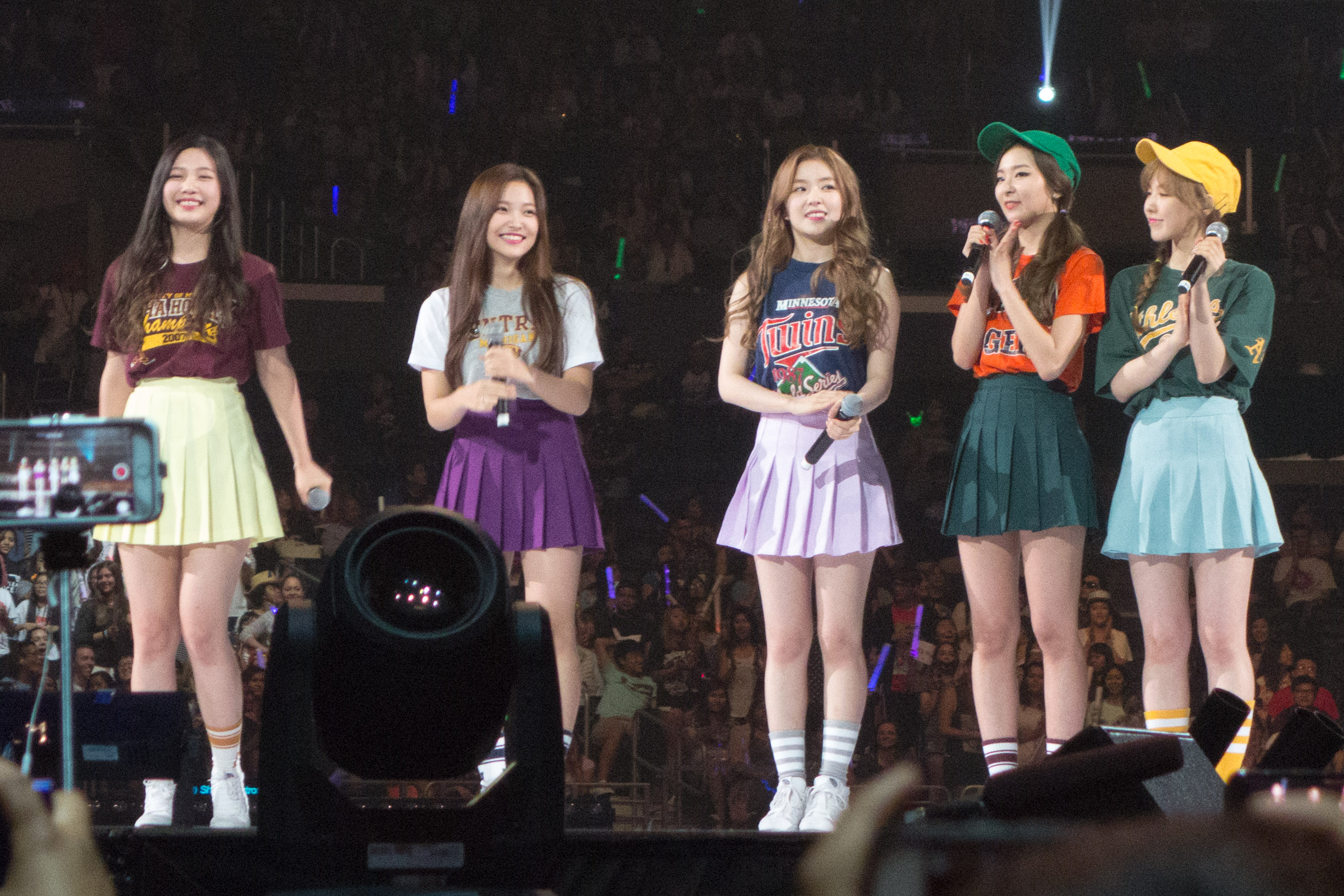
Red Velvet 2015 L.A.

==== Saitama, Japan – April 22 ====
KCON '15 expanded outside the United States for the first time and was held in Japan at the Saitama Super Arena. M.I.B's Korean-Japanese vocalist Kangnam was the events ambassador. The convention/outdoor stage featured Korean artists CODE-V, High4, Shu-I, Tahiti, and 5tion. Performances on the main stage included Got7, Super Junior, Kangnam, My Name, Lovelyz, Block B, Sistar, Infinite, B1A4, 2PM's Jun. K, and Supernova.

Freelance journalist Patrick St. Michel, who has lived in Japan for years, covered the Saitama event for MTV Iggy, complimenting the eagerness of the enthusiastic fans (15,000 at the concert), and KCON 15's successful soft sell of K-pop as a means to help smooth over a long and complicated relationship between Japan and South Korea.

==== Los Angeles – July 31 – August 2 ====
On April 17, 2015, KCON said the California convention would expand to a three-day event, and would move from the Los Angeles Memorial Sports Arena to L.A. Live and the Staples Center in Downtown Los Angeles.

The convention was preceded with U.S. news reports about the drama and film stars to attend, People interviewed "Korean heartthrob" Kim Soo-hyun, and The Hollywood Reporter accounted for Kim (My Love from the Star), Korean American Ki Hong Lee (The Maze Runner, one of People's "Sexiest Men Alive"), U.S. born Daniel Henney (his latest Criminal Minds: Beyond Borders) and Son Ho-jun (Reply 1994); as well as drama sessions to be headlined by writer Park Ji-eun (producer, My Love From Another Star) and director Jin Hyuk (Master's Sun, Doctor Stranger). Actor Son Ho-jun and director Go Min-gum of tvN's "Mr. Baek the Homemade Food Master" appeared at DramaFever's co-sponsored screening room of trending K-dramas.

English-language South Korean media Yonhap called the musical line-up "some of the hottest K-pop artists." It included AOA, Block B, Crush, Got7, Monsta X, Red Velvet, Roy Kim, Shinhwa, Sistar, Super Junior and Zion.T. Getty Images captured photos of Kim Soo-hyun, Eric Nam, and many of the musical performers, individually identifying each name in girl groups AOA, Red Velvet and Sistar.

Billboard noted new group Monsta X after their performance, as a "hot item on the KCON lineup", referring to a similar audience response to KCON '14's newest group, BTS, a group that continued to do a sold-out tour in the U.S. a year later. Billboard gave detailed positive reviews for both night's concerts, and interviewed Red Velvet and Got7.

The Los Angeles Times reviewed Sunday's stage, "the year's most significant concert for one of the world's most fascinating music and cultural scenes." "Mega-group" Super Junior's fan base, the "ELFs", were noticed by media, wearing their blue devil horns, with one 23-year-old describing that when she was sad, just looking at Super Junior made her really happy. Fusion TV named seven of their "favorite KCON fashion statements" of the performing bands.

Another South Korean English-language newspaper, The Korea Times, headlined, "K-pop proves itself a gateway to South Korea at KCON", and interviewed two "older" fans, aged 28 and 31, whose developing interest in K-pop and K-dramas led them to further interests in other Korean culture (technology, skin products, food and fashion). As in previous years, the convention attempted to satisfy attendees, with one South Korea language based institute helping fans write messages of love and support to their favorite stars in Korean. KCON organizer Killoren reiterated that the convention was not just music, but more, "a convention, a concert, content, a conversation."

South Korea government's web portal Korea.net article stated 120 small and medium-sized enterprises set up booths, and included photos taken by Small and Medium Business Administration staff. They said, "Angelenos have shown their strong enthusiasm for all things Korean."

==== New York – August 8 ====
In 2015, KCON expanded to New York City, being held outside of Southern California for the first time.

A day before opening, Vogue discussed fashion and favorite designers with AOA and VIXX, the later kept busy with a first time "showcase" in Orlando, Florida. Vogue told East Coast K-pop fans to "rejoice...KCon, America's premier (read: only) Korean pop culture convention comes to New York for the first time this weekend, bringing four of the country's top acts stateside", and "Keep your eyes and ears out for snappy songs and slick dance moves, but above all, for the colorful fashion trends." After focusing on the idol's fashion wear in L.A., Fusion TV shared the East Coast's fan's homemade and designer fashions.

Killoren told Fusion TV that fans are eager to learn as much as possible about their idols, so the convention tries to provide this, through Q&A sessions with artists by emcees, and "hi-touches" or high fives between fans and band members.

The Korean Cultural Service New York (KCSNY) combined their fifth annual global K-pop singing and dancing competition (with auditions held worldwide) with KCON, for a pre-show concert of six finalists. N.Y.'s Washington Heights group, The Class, won with a performance of VIXX's "Hyde", and will travel to South Korea to represent the U.S. at the K-Pop World Festival.

Teen Top's appearance made them the first band to perform for three consecutive years; along with Girls' Generation, AOA and VIXX.

Billboard's review compared the concert and convention to the inaugural KCON '12 in Irvine, California, pointing to this year's fewer musical acts, but a similar convention set-up, and gave indication of it becoming an "East Coast staple."

The New York Times said, "The tears began as soon as Teen Top waved hello", and interviewed passionate fans, some who lined up for the concert at 2:00 a.m., and attended both the West and East Coast shows. They described fans who wear facial cleanser used by actress Song Ji-hyo of variety show Running Man and according to DramaFever watch over 53.9 hours per month streaming videos, compared with about 10.7 hours for Netflix users, are 85 percent non-Asian, and are mostly women aged 18 to 24.

Fuse TV said the convention attendees were represented by all racial demographics, "women didn't outnumber men the way you'd normally see at a pop music convention", and "teens were out in full force, but not the majority."

==== Jeju, South Korea – November 6–7 ====
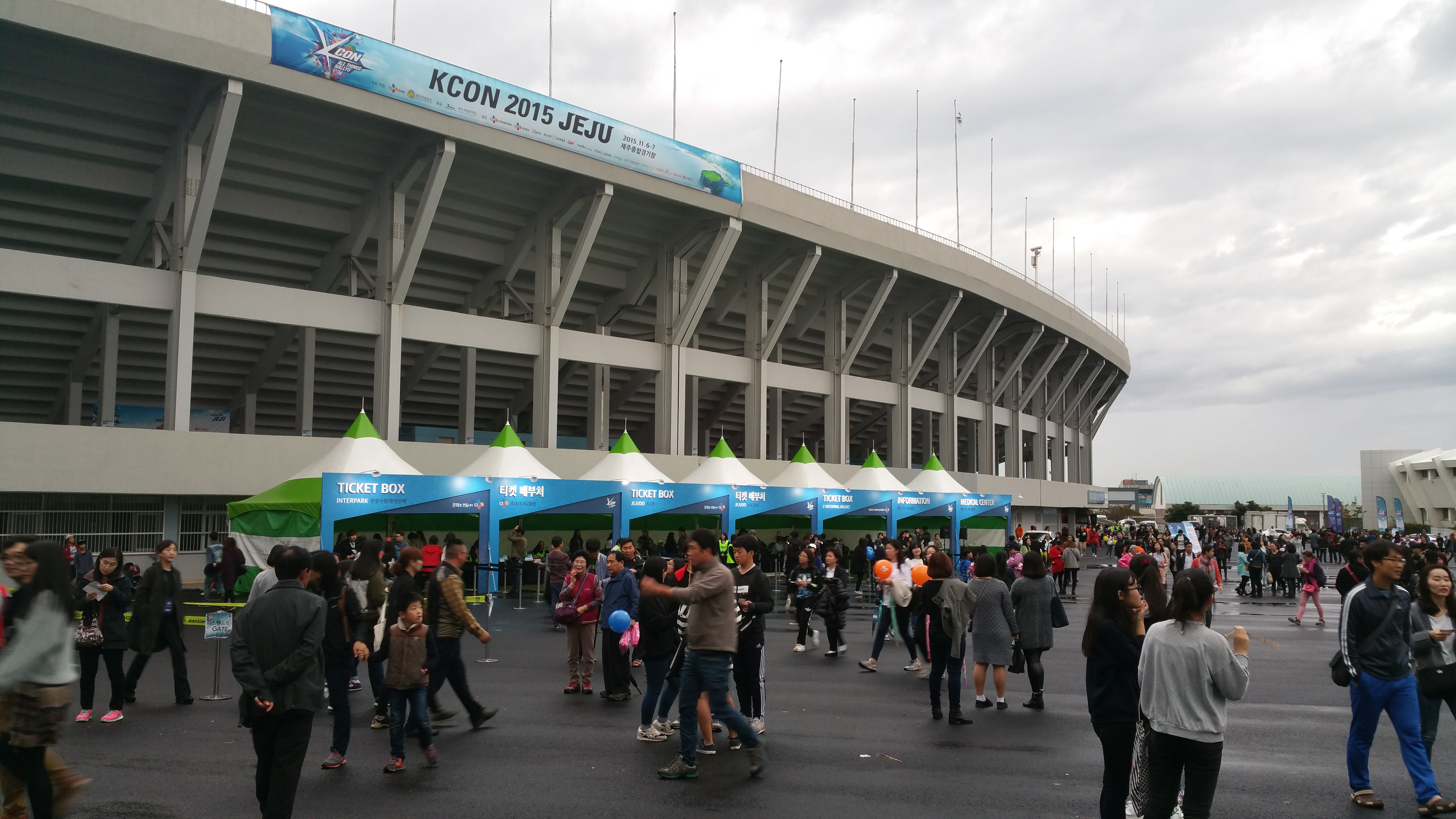
KCON JEJU 2015 Jeju Stadium

In November, KCON held its first 2-day domestic convention and concerts on the South Korean island of Jeju. Daily solo performances were held at the convention hall stage, and a main stadium concert on the second night, with a line-up including Shinhwa, Roy Kim, Block B, SG Wannabe, SPICA, M.I.B's Kangnam, Poten, Park Boram (soloist from Superstar K2), Oh My Girl, Shin Seung-hun, Teen Top, Day6, Paloalto, Mamamoo, Sonamoo and Chen Zi Tong. The Jeju Tourism Organization and CJ E&M said the event was scheduled in hopes of revitalizing the local economy by drawing more tourists to the island.

Logo of KCON:TACT

=== 2020–2021: KCON:TACT ===
In 2020, all in-person KCON events scheduled were cancelled because of the COVID-19 pandemic. On May 14, 2020, KCON announced that online events would take place on Mnet's YouTube channel on June 20–26, 2020, and be titled, "KCON:TACT". The events consisted of four hours of concerts each day, a meet and greet, as well as other benefits included with a YouTube Membership. The second season of KCON:TACT was also held on Mnet and KCON's YouTube channel through membership from October 16 until October 25.

On February 16, 2021, Mnet announced that the online concert and meet and greet would return for nine days from March 20–28, 2021.

=== 2022 ===
In 2022, KCON returned as in-person events. The events were held from May 7 to October 16 in South Korea, Japan, the United States, and for the first time, Saudi Arabia.

=== 2023 ===
In 2023, KCON was held in Thailand, Japan, the United States, and Saudi Arabia. Attendees at KCON LA 2023 were able to watch performances and collaborative stages, as well as participate in fan-engaging events such as the "K-Con Dream Stage", panels, and workshops.

=== 2024 ===
In 2024, the CW unveiled the global simulcast for KCON LA Sunday show, marking the first time the event was broadcast live on American television.

== Reception ==
Jeff Benjamin, Billboard K-Town columnist, wrote that the convention has "hit every note to provide a new look at a world of music still gaining ground in the U.S.", and with thousands of people from all over North America attending KCON '12, the convention has "truly proved its ability to pass language barriers and kick-start what may be an annual music tradition." The Orange County Register described KCON '12 as "A daylong K-Pop invasion at Verizon Wireless Amphitheater".

In 2014, New York City's Fuse TV said, "In just three years, KCON has become an annual pilgrimage for K-pop fans in America." NBC News said, "Thousands of screaming fans and the stars they adore gathered in Los Angeles for KCON, a celebration of Korean pop music and culture". Miami's Fusion TV called KCON '14 "the mother ship of all Korean culture events in this country", and observed, "k-pop fans might be the most devoted in the entire world." Melissa Block of NPR's All Things Considered said of KCON '14, "K-pop is here to stay."

In 2015, Daniel Kreps of Rolling Stone wrote: "KCON has become so popular in the U.S. that even the Los Angeles fest is expanding to a larger venue...as attendance has ballooned since the inaugural KCON LA in 2012", and "will go bi-coastal...and head to Newark", adding, "KCON also hosted their first ever Japan convention." August Brown of the Los Angeles Times wrote: "In its early years, many wondered whether a South Korean act (other than Psy) could impact mainstream top-40 pop. But after watching the Sunday night installment of KCON 2015, it's clear that's the wrong question. K-pop's young and wide-ranging audience is the new mainstream in America."

== Locations and dates ==
=== 2012–2019 ===
| Date | City | Country | Venue | Attendance | Line-up |
|---|---|---|---|---|---|
| October 13, 2012 | Irvine | United States | Verizon Wireless Amphitheatre | 10,000 | 4Minute, B.A.P, Exo-M, G.NA, NU'EST, VIXX |
| August 24, 2013 | Los Angeles | United States | Los Angeles Memorial Sports Arena | 20,000 | 2AM, Dynamic Duo, Exo (K & M), f(x) (with DJ Koo), G-Dragon, Crayon Pop, Henry Lau, Missy Elliott, Teen Top, Yu Seung Woo (with Heejun Han) |
| August 25, 2013 | Los Angeles | United States | Los Angeles Memorial Sports Arena | 20,000 | 2AM, Dynamic Duo, Exo (K & M), f(x) (with DJ Koo), G-Dragon, Crayon Pop, Henry Lau, Missy Elliott, Teen Top, Yu Seung Woo (with Heejun Han) |
| August 9, 2014 | Los Angeles | United States | Los Angeles Memorial Sports Arena | 42,000 | G-Dragon, B1A4, IU, Teen Top, VIXX |
| August 10, 2014 | Los Angeles | United States | Los Angeles Memorial Sports Arena | 42,000 | Girls' Generation, BTS, CNBLUE, Jung Joon-young, Spica |
| April 22, 2015 | Saitama | Japan | Saitama Super Arena | 15,000 | Outdoor Stage; 5tion, CODE-V, High4, Shu-I, Tahiti |
| April 22, 2015 | Saitama | Japan | Saitama Super Arena | 15,000 | M Countdown Stage; Block B, B1A4, Boyfriend, Got7, Infinite, Jun. K, Kangnam, Lovelyz, My Name, Nicole, Sistar, Supernova |
| August 1, 2015 | Los Angeles | United States | Staples Center | 58,000 | Got7, Monsta X, Roy Kim, Sistar, Super Junior |
| August 2, 2015 | Los Angeles | United States | Staples Center | 58,000 | AOA, Block B, Red Velvet, Shinhwa, Zion.T & Crush |
| August 8, 2015 | Newark, New Jersey | United States | Prudential Center | 17,000 | Girls' Generation, VIXX, AOA, Teen Top |
| November 6–7, 2015 | Jeju City | South Korea | Jeju Stadium | 17,000 | Convention Stage; Day6, Park Boram, Paloalto, Sonamoo, Mamamoo, Poten, Roy Kim, Oh My Girl |
| November 6–7, 2015 | Jeju City | South Korea | Jeju Stadium | 17,000 | Stadium Concert; Block B, Kangnam, Teen Top, Spica, Roy Kim, Chen Zi Tong, SG Wannabe, Shin Seung-hun, Shinhwa |
| March 25, 2016 | Abu Dhabi | United Arab Emirates | Yas Island – DU ARENA | 8,000 | BTS, Taeyeon, Kyuhyun, Double S 301, Ailee, Monsta X, Spica |
| April 9, 2016 | Chiba | Japan | Makuhari Messe | 33,000 | AOA, Kim Sung-kyu, Lovelyz, Monsta X, Nicole, N.Flying, Winner |
| April 10, 2016 | Chiba | Japan | Makuhari Messe | 33,000 | 2PM, Boyfriend, Twice, Block B, Day6, Jun Jin, Heize |
| June 2, 2016 | Paris | France | AccorHotels Arena | 18,476 | BTS, Block B, Shinee, F.T. Island, f(x), I.O.I |
| June 24, 2016 | Newark, New Jersey | United States | Prudential Center | 40,000 | Ailee, BtoB, Crush, Dynamic Duo, Seventeen |
| June 25, 2016 | Newark, New Jersey | United States | Prudential Center | 40,000 | BTS, Day6, Eric Nam, Mamamoo |
| July 30, 2016 | Los Angeles | United States | Staples Center | 35,000 | Block B, Dean, Amber, GFriend, I.O.I, Shinee, Turbo |
| July 31, 2016 | Los Angeles | United States | Staples Center | 35,000 | Astro, BTS, Davichi, Eric Nam, Girls' Generation-TTS, Monsta X, Twice |
| March 17, 2017 | Mexico City | Mexico | Mexico City Arena | 33,000 | BTS, Eric Nam, EXID, NCT 127 |
| March 18, 2017 | Mexico City | Mexico | Mexico City Arena | 33,000 | Astro, Infinite H, Monsta X, Red Velvet |
| May 19, 2017 | Chiba | Japan | Makuhari Messe | 48,500 | Convention Stage; A-Jax, Boys Republic, INX, NAUGHTYBOYS, Noh Ji Hoon, Pungdeng-E, Stellar, TopSecret, TRITOPS |
| May 19, 2017 | Chiba | Japan | Makuhari Messe | 48,500 | M Countdown Stage; Apeace, Astro, BTOB, Day6, Junho, Pristin, SF9, Victon |
| May 20, 2017 | Chiba | Japan | Makuhari Messe | 48,500 | Convention Stage; A-Jax, Boys Republic, INX, NAUGHTYBOYS, Noh Ji Hoon, Pungdeng-E, Stellar, TopSecret, TRITOPS, UNIONE |
| May 20, 2017 | Chiba | Japan | Makuhari Messe | 48,500 | M Countdown Stage; Apink, Babylon, CLC, CNBLUE, Got7, Heize, Lovelyz, Monsta X |
| May 21, 2017 | Chiba | Japan | Makuhari Messe | 48,500 | Convention Stage; A-Jax, INX, NAUGHTYBOYS, Noh Ji Hoon, Pungdeng-E, Stellar, TopSecret, TRITOPS, UNIONE |
| May 21, 2017 | Chiba | Japan | Makuhari Messe | 48,500 | M Countdown Stage; Block B, CODE-V, GFriend, K.Will, Pentagon, Seventeen, Boys24 Unit Black, Cosmic Girls |
| June 23, 2017 | Newark, New Jersey | United States | Prudential Center | 43,000 | GFriend, Highlight, KNK, SF9, Zion.T |
| June 24, 2017 | Newark, New Jersey | United States | Prudential Center | 43,000 | CNBLUE, NCT 127, Twice, UP10TION |
| August 19, 2017 | Los Angeles | United States | Staples Center | 40,000 | Cosmic Girls, Girl's Day, Seventeen, SF9, Super Junior-D&E, VIXX |
| August 20, 2017 | Los Angeles | United States | Staples Center | 40,000 | Astro, Got7, Heize, Kard, NCT 127, Wanna One, Oh My Girl, Kim Tae-Woo |
| September 22, 2017 | Sydney | Australia | Qudos Bank Arena | 21,000 | Exo, Girl's Day, Pentagon, SF9, Victon |
| September 23, 2017 | Sydney | Australia | Qudos Bank Arena | 21,000 | Cosmic Girls, Monsta X, SF9, UP10TION, Wanna One |
| April 13, 2018 | Chiba | Japan | Makuhari Messe | 68,000 | Convention Stage; CODE-V, Ha Min-woo, MASC, Million seller, Moon Shine, NEON |
| April 13, 2018 | Chiba | Japan | Makuhari Messe | 68,000 | M Countdown Stage; Gugudan, Momoland, Pentagon, Samuel, Wanna One, Rainz, Cosmic Girls, Victon, Chungha |
| April 14, 2018 | Chiba | Japan | Makuhari Messe | 68,000 | Convention Stage; A.C.E, CODE-V, Ha Min-woo, MASC, Million Seller, Moon Shine, NEON |
| April 14, 2018 | Chiba | Japan | Makuhari Messe | 68,000 | M Countdown Stage; Fromis 9, GFriend, Seventeen, Stray Kids, Wooyoung, BLK, Imfact, Sik-K, TRCNG, Reddy |
| April 15, 2018 | Chiba | Japan | Makuhari Messe | 68,000 | Convention Stage; A.C.E, Ha Min-woo, MASC, Million Seller, Moon Shine, NEON |
| April 15, 2018 | Chiba | Japan | Makuhari Messe | 68,000 | M Countdown Stage; Golden Child, Monsta X, SF9, Sunmi, Twice, Heize (with Davii), The Boyz, N.Flying, IN2IT |
| June 23, 2018 | Newark, New Jersey | United States | Prudential Center | 53,000 | Heize, Pentagon, Red Velvet, Super Junior, Stray Kids |
| June 24, 2018 | Newark, New Jersey | United States | Prudential Center | 53,000 | EXID, Fromis 9, Wanna One, NCT 127, Golden Child |
| August 11, 2018 | Los Angeles | United States | Staples Center | 50,000 | Ailee, Crush, Dynamic Duo, Golden Child, IN2IT, Momoland, Twice, Wanna One, Davichi, Mia |
| August 12, 2018 | Los Angeles | United States | Staples Center | 50,000 | Chungha, Fromis 9, Imfact, NU'EST W, Pentagon, Seventeen, Dreamcatcher, Roy Kim |
| September 29, 2018 | Bangkok | Thailand | IMPACT Arena | 42,000 | Chungha, Golden Child, Monsta X, Nature, Stray Kids, Sunmi, Wanna One |
| September 30, 2018 | Bangkok | Thailand | IMPACT Arena | 42,000 | Fromis 9, (G)I-dle, Got7, Pentagon, The Boyz, The East Light, Varsity |
| May 17, 2019 | Chiba | Japan | Makuhari Messe | 68,000 | Convention Stage; A.C.E, A-Peace, D-Crunch, G Most, In&Cho, MAP6, MY.st, NTB, Oneus, Onewe, Pink Fantasy, SIM YEJUN, Spectrum, The Rose, Trei, Two.Brothers, Voisper |
| May 17, 2019 | Chiba | Japan | Makuhari Messe | 68,000 | M Countdown Stage; Kim Jaehwan, The Boyz, Ha Sung-woon, Momoland, Iz*One, Ateez, AB6IX, Jeong Se-woon, Cherry Bullet, The Rose |
| May 18, 2019 | Chiba | Japan | Makuhari Messe | 68,000 | Convention Stage; A-Peace, D-Crunch, G Most, In&Choo, MAP6, MY.st, Niiisans's, NTB, Oneus, Onewe, Pink Fantasy, SIM YEJUN, Spectrum, The Rose, Trei, Two.Brothers, Voisper |
| May 18, 2019 | Chiba | Japan | Makuhari Messe | 68,000 | M Countdown Stage; Itzy, WJSN, Verivery, Monsta X, ONF, Chungha, NU'EST, A.C.E, The Rose, Park Ji-hoon, TARGET |
| May 19, 2019 | Chiba | Japan | Makuhari Messe | 68,000 | Convention Stage; A.C.E, A-Peace, G Most, In&Choo, MY.st, Niiisans's, NTB, Onewe, Pink Fantasy, SIM YEJUN, Spectrum, The Rose, Trei, Two.Brothers, Voisper |
| May 19, 2019 | Chiba | Japan | Makuhari Messe | 68,000 | M Countdown Stage; Iz*One, Twice, Pentagon, GWSN, SF9, Oneus, Nature, VAV, Fromis 9, The Rose, D-Crunch |
| July 6, 2019 | New York City | United States | Madison Square Garden | —N/a | NU'EST, TXT, Ateez, Iz*One, The Boyz, Kevin Woo |
| July 7, 2019 | New York City | United States | Javits Center | —N/a | SF9, (G)I-dle, AB6IX, Verivery, Seventeen, Fromis 9 |
| August 17, 2019 | Los Angeles | United States | Los Angeles Convention Center | —N/a | AB6IX, Ateez, Iz*One, Loona, Momoland, NU'EST, SF9 |
| August 18, 2019 | Los Angeles | United States | Staples Center | —N/a | Fromis 9, Itzy, Mamamoo, N.Flying, Seventeen, Stray Kids, Verivery |
| September 28, 2019 | Bangkok | Thailand | IMPACT Arena | 45,000 | Boy Story, Everglow, Golden Child, Got7, Kim Jaehwan, Oneus, The Boyz, Itzy, Nature, X1 |
| September 29, 2019 | Bangkok | Thailand | IMPACT Arena | 45,000 | Iz*One, Stray Kids, AB6IX, Ateez, (G)I-dle, Verivery, Bvndit, Chungha, X1 |

=== 2020–2021: KCON through COVID-19 pandemic ===
| Date | City | Country | Venue | Attendance | Line-up |
|---|---|---|---|---|---|
| June 20, 2020 | KCON:TACT Summer; Live Online Concert & Meet and Greet Worldwide* (except countries below): Mnet K-Pop YouTube Channel; *Requires YouTube Membership Indonesia, Malaysia, Philippines, Singapore, Taiwan, Vietnam: Shopee Thailand: AIS Play | | | | Kim Jae-hwan (with special participation of Park Woo-jin), Loona, Monsta X, The Boyz; MC: Eric Nam; Theme: New |
| June 21, 2020 | KCON:TACT Summer; Live Online Concert & Meet and Greet Worldwide* (except countries below): Mnet K-Pop YouTube Channel; *Requires YouTube Membership Indonesia, Malaysia, Philippines, Singapore, Taiwan, Vietnam: Shopee Thailand: AIS Play | | | | Cravity, GFriend, Itzy, JO1, Pentagon; MC: Thelma Aoyama, Eric Nam; Theme: Hope |
| June 22, 2020 | KCON:TACT Summer; Live Online Concert & Meet and Greet Worldwide* (except countries below): Mnet K-Pop YouTube Channel; *Requires YouTube Membership Indonesia, Malaysia, Philippines, Singapore, Taiwan, Vietnam: Shopee Thailand: AIS Play | | | | Everglow, Iz*One, ONF, SF9, TXT; MC: Eric Nam; Theme: Fantasy |
| June 23, 2020 | KCON:TACT Summer; Live Online Concert & Meet and Greet Worldwide* (except countries below): Mnet K-Pop YouTube Channel; *Requires YouTube Membership Indonesia, Malaysia, Philippines, Singapore, Taiwan, Vietnam: Shopee Thailand: AIS Play | | | | A.C.E, (G)I-dle, Kang Daniel, Stray Kids, Verivery; MC: Eric Nam; Theme: Love |
| June 24, 2020 | KCON:TACT Summer; Live Online Concert & Meet and Greet Worldwide* (except countries below): Mnet K-Pop YouTube Channel; *Requires YouTube Membership Indonesia, Malaysia, Philippines, Singapore, Taiwan, Vietnam: Shopee Thailand: AIS Play | | | | AB6IX, Bvndit, Natty, Oh My Girl, TOO; MC: Eric Nam; Theme: Passion |
| June 25, 2020 | KCON:TACT Summer; Live Online Concert & Meet and Greet Worldwide* (except countries below): Mnet K-Pop YouTube Channel; *Requires YouTube Membership Indonesia, Malaysia, Philippines, Singapore, Taiwan, Vietnam: Shopee Thailand: AIS Play | | | | Astro, Golden Child, Mamamoo, Nature, N.Flying; MC: Eric Nam; Theme: Dream |
| June 26, 2020 | KCON:TACT Summer; Live Online Concert & Meet and Greet Worldwide* (except countries below): Mnet K-Pop YouTube Channel; *Requires YouTube Membership Indonesia, Malaysia, Philippines, Singapore, Taiwan, Vietnam: Shopee Thailand: AIS Play | | | | Ateez, Chungha, Oneus, Victon; Special Online Collaboration with All Artists; MC: Eric Nam; Theme: One |
| October 16, 2020 | KCON:TACT Season 2 (Fall); Live Online Concert & Meet and Greet Worldwide* (except countries below): Mnet K-Pop YouTube Channel; KCON YouTube Channel; *Requires YouTube Membership Philippines: Smart Communications (gigafest.smart) Thailand: AIS Play | | | | Day6 (Even of Day) (with special participation of ONF's Hyojin), Everglow, Sunmi, WEi (Concert & Meet and Greet); MC: Eric Nam |
| October 17, 2020 | KCON:TACT Season 2 (Fall); Live Online Concert & Meet and Greet Worldwide* (except countries below): Mnet K-Pop YouTube Channel; KCON YouTube Channel; *Requires YouTube Membership Philippines: Smart Communications (gigafest.smart) Thailand: AIS Play | | | | A.C.E, JO1, Kard, Natty, Iz*One (Concert & Meet and Greet); MC: Thelma Aoyama, Eric Nam |
| October 18, 2020 | KCON:TACT Season 2 (Fall); Live Online Concert & Meet and Greet Worldwide* (except countries below): Mnet K-Pop YouTube Channel; KCON YouTube Channel; *Requires YouTube Membership Philippines: Smart Communications (gigafest.smart) Thailand: AIS Play | | | | Ateez, Dreamcatcher, Kim Woo-seok, Lee Eun-sang, Cho Seung-youn (Concert & Meet and Greet); MC: Eric Nam |
| October 19, 2020 | KCON:TACT Season 2 (Fall); Live Online Concert & Meet and Greet Worldwide* (except countries below): Mnet K-Pop YouTube Channel; KCON YouTube Channel; *Requires YouTube Membership Philippines: Smart Communications (gigafest.smart) Thailand: AIS Play | | | | A.C.E & Kim Woo-seok (Meet and Greet) |
| October 20, 2020 | KCON:TACT Season 2 (Fall); Live Online Concert & Meet and Greet Worldwide* (except countries below): Mnet K-Pop YouTube Channel; KCON YouTube Channel; *Requires YouTube Membership Philippines: Smart Communications (gigafest.smart) Thailand: AIS Play | | | | WEi & Cho Seung-youn (Meet and Greet) |
| October 21, 2020 | KCON:TACT Season 2 (Fall); Live Online Concert & Meet and Greet Worldwide* (except countries below): Mnet K-Pop YouTube Channel; KCON YouTube Channel; *Requires YouTube Membership Philippines: Smart Communications (gigafest.smart) Thailand: AIS Play | | | | Ghost9 & Lee Eun-sang (Meet and Greet) |
| October 22, 2020 | KCON:TACT Season 2 (Fall); Live Online Concert & Meet and Greet Worldwide* (except countries below): Mnet K-Pop YouTube Channel; KCON YouTube Channel; *Requires YouTube Membership Philippines: Smart Communications (gigafest.smart) Thailand: AIS Play | | | | TOO & Verivery (Meet and Greet) |
| October 23, 2020 | KCON:TACT Season 2 (Fall); Live Online Concert & Meet and Greet Worldwide* (except countries below): Mnet K-Pop YouTube Channel; KCON YouTube Channel; *Requires YouTube Membership Philippines: Smart Communications (gigafest.smart) Thailand: AIS Play | | | | Oneus, ONF, The Boyz, Verivery (Concert & Meet and Greet); MC: Eric Nam |
| October 24, 2020 | KCON:TACT Season 2 (Fall); Live Online Concert & Meet and Greet Worldwide* (except countries below): Mnet K-Pop YouTube Channel; KCON YouTube Channel; *Requires YouTube Membership Philippines: Smart Communications (gigafest.smart) Thailand: AIS Play | | | | AB6IX, Ha Sung-woon, Kim Jae-hwan, Park Ji-hoon (Concert & Meet and Greet); MC: Eric Nam |
| October 25, 2020 | KCON:TACT Season 2 (Fall); Live Online Concert & Meet and Greet Worldwide* (except countries below): Mnet K-Pop YouTube Channel; KCON YouTube Channel; *Requires YouTube Membership Philippines: Smart Communications (gigafest.smart) Thailand: AIS Play | | | | CLC, Ghost9, Loona, Mamamoo, TOO (Concert & Meet and Greet); MC: Eric Nam |
| March 20, 2021 | KCON:TACT 3 Live Online Concert & Meet and Greet Worldwide (except countries below): Mnet K-Pop YouTube Channel; KCON YouTube Channel; *Requires YouTube Membership South Korea: TVING Japan: PIA Philippines: Smart Communications (gigafest.smart) Thailand: AIS Play Malaysia: Astro | | | | AB6IX, Loona, Oh My Girl, The Boyz (Concert & Meet and Greet); MC: Lee Gi-kwang |
| March 21, 2021 | KCON:TACT 3 Live Online Concert & Meet and Greet Worldwide (except countries below): Mnet K-Pop YouTube Channel; KCON YouTube Channel; *Requires YouTube Membership South Korea: TVING Japan: PIA Philippines: Smart Communications (gigafest.smart) Thailand: AIS Play Malaysia: Astro | | | | Dreamcatcher, SF9, TXT, Woodz (Concert & Meet and Greet); MC: Lee Gi-kwang |
| March 23, 2021 | KCON:TACT 3 Live Online Concert & Meet and Greet Worldwide (except countries below): Mnet K-Pop YouTube Channel; KCON YouTube Channel; *Requires YouTube Membership South Korea: TVING Japan: PIA Philippines: Smart Communications (gigafest.smart) Thailand: AIS Play Malaysia: Astro | | | | JO1 (Meet and Greet) |
| March 25, 2021 | KCON:TACT 3 Live Online Concert & Meet and Greet Worldwide (except countries below): Mnet K-Pop YouTube Channel; KCON YouTube Channel; *Requires YouTube Membership South Korea: TVING Japan: PIA Philippines: Smart Communications (gigafest.smart) Thailand: AIS Play Malaysia: Astro | | | | Ha Sung-woon, iKON, Jessi, JO1, P1Harmony (Concert & Meet and Greet); MC: Lee Gi-kwang |
| March 26, 2021 | KCON:TACT 3 Live Online Concert & Meet and Greet Worldwide (except countries below): Mnet K-Pop YouTube Channel; KCON YouTube Channel; *Requires YouTube Membership South Korea: TVING Japan: PIA Philippines: Smart Communications (gigafest.smart) Thailand: AIS Play Malaysia: Astro | | | | A.C.E, Everglow, Hyuna, Lee Jin-hyuk, Stray Kids (Concert & Meet and Greet); MC: Lee Gi-kwang |
| March 27, 2021 | KCON:TACT 3 Live Online Concert & Meet and Greet Worldwide (except countries below): Mnet K-Pop YouTube Channel; KCON YouTube Channel; *Requires YouTube Membership South Korea: TVING Japan: PIA Philippines: Smart Communications (gigafest.smart) Thailand: AIS Play Malaysia: Astro | | | | Ateez, Enhypen, Itzy, Sunmi (Concert & Meet and Greet); MC: Lee Gi-kwang |
| March 28, 2021 | KCON:TACT 3 Live Online Concert & Meet and Greet Worldwide (except countries below): Mnet K-Pop YouTube Channel; KCON YouTube Channel; *Requires YouTube Membership South Korea: TVING Japan: PIA Philippines: Smart Communications (gigafest.smart) Thailand: AIS Play Malaysia: Astro | | | | BtoB 4U, Kang Daniel, Mamamoo, TOO (Concert & Meet and Greet); MC: Lee Gi-kwang |
| June 19, 2021 | KCON:TACT 4U; Live Online Concert & Meet and Greet Worldwide (except countries below): Mnet K-Pop YouTube Channel; KCON YouTube Channel; *Requires YouTube Membership South Korea: TVING Japan: PIA Philippines: Smart Communications (gigafest.smart) | | | | Ha Sung-woon, Highlight, Loona, Oneus, P1Harmony (Concert & Meet and Greet); MC: Lee Gi-kwang |
| June 20, 2021 | KCON:TACT 4U; Live Online Concert & Meet and Greet Worldwide (except countries below): Mnet K-Pop YouTube Channel; KCON YouTube Channel; *Requires YouTube Membership South Korea: TVING Japan: PIA Philippines: Smart Communications (gigafest.smart) | | | | A.C.E, Astro, Fromis 9, TO1, Weeekly (Concert & Meet and Greet); MC: Lee Gi-kwang |
| June 24, 2021 | KCON:TACT 4U; Live Online Concert & Meet and Greet Worldwide (except countries below): Mnet K-Pop YouTube Channel; KCON YouTube Channel; *Requires YouTube Membership South Korea: TVING Japan: PIA Philippines: Smart Communications (gigafest.smart) | | | | Itzy, Pentagon, Seventeen, Verivery, Weki Meki (Concert & Meet and Greet); MC: Lee Gi-kwang |
| June 25, 2021 | KCON:TACT 4U; Live Online Concert & Meet and Greet Worldwide (except countries below): Mnet K-Pop YouTube Channel; KCON YouTube Channel; *Requires YouTube Membership South Korea: TVING Japan: PIA Philippines: Smart Communications (gigafest.smart) | | | | CNBLUE, Everglow, Golden Child, JO1, ONF (Concert & Meet and Greet); MC: Lee Gi-kwang |
| June 26, 2021 | KCON:TACT 4U; Live Online Concert & Meet and Greet Worldwide (except countries below): Mnet K-Pop YouTube Channel; KCON YouTube Channel; *Requires YouTube Membership South Korea: TVING Japan: PIA Philippines: Smart Communications (gigafest.smart) | | | | iKON, SF9, The Boyz (Concert & Meet and Greet); MC: Lee Gi-kwang |
| June 27, 2021 | KCON:TACT 4U; Live Online Concert & Meet and Greet Worldwide (except countries below): Mnet K-Pop YouTube Channel; KCON YouTube Channel; *Requires YouTube Membership South Korea: TVING Japan: PIA Philippines: Smart Communications (gigafest.smart) | | | | BtoB, Oh My Girl, Stray Kids (Concert & Meet and Greet); MC: Lee Gi-kwang |
| September 18, 2021 | KCON:TACT HI5; Live Online Concert & Meet and Greet Worldwide (except countries below): Mnet K-Pop YouTube Channel; KCON YouTube Channel; *Requires YouTube Membership South Korea: TVING Japan: PIA Philippines: Smart Communications (gigafest.smart) | | | | AB6IX, Highlight, Park Ji-hoon, Weeekly, WEi (Concert & Meet and Greet) |
| September 19, 2021 | KCON:TACT HI5; Live Online Concert & Meet and Greet Worldwide (except countries below): Mnet K-Pop YouTube Channel; KCON YouTube Channel; *Requires YouTube Membership South Korea: TVING Japan: PIA Philippines: Smart Communications (gigafest.smart) | | | | Dreamcatcher, Ghost9, Kwon Eunbi, Stray Kids (Concert & Meet and Greet) |
| September 24, 2021 | KCON:TACT HI5; Live Online Concert & Meet and Greet Worldwide (except countries below): Mnet K-Pop YouTube Channel; KCON YouTube Channel; *Requires YouTube Membership South Korea: TVING Japan: PIA Philippines: Smart Communications (gigafest.smart) | | | | Ateez, Ciipher, Mamamoo, Woodz (Concert & Meet and Greet) |
| September 25, 2021 | KCON:TACT HI5; Live Online Concert & Meet and Greet Worldwide (except countries below): Mnet K-Pop YouTube Channel; KCON YouTube Channel; *Requires YouTube Membership South Korea: TVING Japan: PIA Philippines: Smart Communications (gigafest.smart) | | | | BtoB, JO1, Kim Jae-hwan, Purple Kiss, TO1 (Concert & Meet and Greet) |
| September 26, 2021 | KCON:TACT HI5; Live Online Concert & Meet and Greet Worldwide (except countries below): Mnet K-Pop YouTube Channel; KCON YouTube Channel; *Requires YouTube Membership South Korea: TVING Japan: PIA Philippines: Smart Communications (gigafest.smart) | | | | Itzy, ONF, Rain, T1419, The Boyz (Concert & Meet and Greet) |

=== 2022–present ===
| Date | City | Country | Venue | Attendance | Line-up |
|---|---|---|---|---|---|
| May 7, 2022 | KCON 2022 Premiere Seoul | South Korea | CJ ENM Center | TBA | Highlight, Monsta X, Nmixx, TO1, Viviz, Loona, WJSN, Brave Girls, Kep1er, Hyolyn |
| May 8, 2022 | KCON 2022 Premiere Seoul | South Korea | CJ ENM Center | TBA | Key, STAYC, The Boyz, NiziU, Viviz, Loona, WJSN, Brave Girls, Kep1er, Hyolyn |
| May 14, 2022 | KCON 2022 Premiere Chiba | Japan | Makuhari Messe | TBA | Enjin, INI, JO1, Octpath, OWV, TO1; MC: Masayuki Furuya, Nako Yabuki |
| May 15, 2022 | KCON 2022 Premiere Chiba | Japan | Makuhari Messe | TBA | Enjin, INI, JO1, Octpath, OWV, TO1; MC: Masayuki Furuya, Hitomi Honda; Special Guest: Yuto |
| May 20, 2022 | KCON 2022 Premiere Chicago | United States | Rosemont Theatre | TBA | BtoB, Cravity, Nmixx |
| May 21, 2022 | KCON 2022 Premiere Chicago | United States | Rosemont Theatre | TBA | BtoB, STAYC, TO1 |
| August 20, 2022 | Los Angeles | United States | Crypto.com Arena (Concert); LA Convention Center (Convention) | 90,000 | Ateez, Cravity, Enhypen, INI, Itzy, Kep1er, Lightsum, Stray Kids |
| August 21, 2022 | Los Angeles | United States | Crypto.com Arena (Concert); LA Convention Center (Convention) | 90,000 | Loona, NCT Dream, Nmixx, P1Harmony, STAYC, The Boyz, TO1, WJSN |
| August 23, 2022 | KCON Tour San Francisco | United States | Orpheum Theatre | TBA | Cravity, Lightsum, STAYC, TO1 |
| August 25, 2022 | KCON Tour Minneapolis | United States | State Theatre | TBA | Cravity, Lightsum, STAYC, TO1 |
| August 27, 2022 | KCON Tour Houston | United States | Sarofim Hall | TBA | Cravity, Lightsum, STAYC, TO1 |
| August 28, 2022 | KCON Tour Dallas | United States | Texas Trust CU Theatre | TBA | Cravity, Lightsum, STAYC, TO1 |
| August 30, 2022 | KCON Tour Atlanta | United States | The Eastern | TBA | Cravity, Lightsum, STAYC, TO1 |
| September 1, 2022 | KCON Tour New York | United States | Terminal 5 | TBA | Cravity, Lightsum, STAYC, TO1 |
| September 30, 2022 | Riyadh | Saudi Arabia | Boulevard Riyadh City | TBA | P1Harmony, Pentagon, Rain, Secret Number, Sunmi, The Boyz |
| October 1, 2022 | Riyadh | Saudi Arabia | Boulevard Riyadh City | TBA | Ateez, Hyolyn, NewJeans, Oneus, STAYC, TO1 |
| October 14, 2022 | Tokyo | Japan | Ariake Arena | TBA | Kihyun, Le Sserafim, Nmixx, TNX, INI, Octpath, TO1, Viviz |
| October 15, 2022 | Tokyo | Japan | Ariake Arena | TBA | IVE, JO1, NewJeans, ATBO, DKZ, Fromis 9, Tomorrow X Together |
| October 16, 2022 | Tokyo | Japan | Ariake Arena | TBA | Jo Yu-ri, Kep1er, NiziU, Tempest, Ateez, Brave Girls, DKB |
| March 18, 2023 | Bangkok | Thailand | IMPACT Arena | TBA | BamBam, (G)I-dle, iKON, JO1, Mbitious, Xikers, P1Harmony, 8Turn |
| March 19, 2023 | Bangkok | Thailand | IMPACT Arena | TBA | Youngjae, Ateez, Itzy, Kep1er, Tempest, INI, TO1, TNX |
| May 12, 2023 | Chiba | Japan | Makuhari Messe | 123,000 | The Boyz, Yena, NiziU, STAYC, Just B, INI, 8Turn |
| May 13, 2023 | Chiba | Japan | Makuhari Messe | 123,000 | AB6IX, Ateez, JO1, Viviz, XG, Le Sserafim, ATBO, DXTEEN |
| May 14, 2023 | Chiba | Japan | Makuhari Messe | 123,000 | iKON, Itzy, Enhypen, Kep1er, Tempest, &TEAM, Xikers, Zerobaseone |
| August 18, 2023 | Los Angeles | United States | Crypto.com Arena (Concert); LA Convention Center (Convention) | 140,000 | Cravity, IVE, Shownu X Hyungwon, Nmixx, Taemin, Taeyong, WayV |
| August 19, 2023 | Los Angeles | United States | Crypto.com Arena (Concert); LA Convention Center (Convention) | 140,000 | Ateez, INI, Kep1er, Rain, XG, Xikers, Zerobaseone |
| August 20, 2023 | Los Angeles | United States | Crypto.com Arena (Concert); LA Convention Center (Convention) | 140,000 | Everglow, (G)I-dle, Itzy, JO1, Lapillus, Stray Kids, The Boyz |
| October 6, 2023 | Riyadh | Saudi Arabia | Boulevard Riyadh City | TBA | Everglow, Highlight, Hyolyn, Kard, Riize, Super Junior-D&E, 8Turn |
| October 7, 2023 | Riyadh | Saudi Arabia | Boulevard Riyadh City | TBA | Dreamcatcher, El7z Up, Evnne, Oh My Girl, Super Junior, Tempest, The New Six |
| March 30, 2024 | Hong Kong | Hong Kong, China | AsiaWorld–Expo | 45,000 | Aespa, BoyNextDoor, Highlight, TWS, WayV, Xikers, Yena, Viviz |
| March 31, 2024 | Hong Kong | Hong Kong, China | AsiaWorld–Expo | 45,000 | Ateez, Day6, JO1, Sistar19, Tempest, Viviz, Zerobaseone |
| May 10, 2024 | Tokyo | Japan | Zozo Marine Stadium (Concert); Makuhari Messe (Convention) | 140,000 | Convention Stage; BoyNextDoor, DXTEEN, INI, Hong Isaac, Is:sue, TWS |
| May 11, 2024 | Tokyo | Japan | Zozo Marine Stadium (Concert); Makuhari Messe (Convention) | 140,000 | Convention Stage; Kep1er, Me:I, NCT Wish, N.SSign, P1Harmony, Tempest |
| May 11, 2024 | Tokyo | Japan | Zozo Marine Stadium (Concert); Makuhari Messe (Convention) | 140,000 | M Countdown Stage; BoyNextDoor, B.D.U, Cha Eun-woo, Epex, INI, Kep1er, Key, NiziU, P1Harmony, Red Velvet, The New Six, The Wind, TWS, Zerobaseone |
| May 12, 2024 | Tokyo | Japan | Zozo Marine Stadium (Concert); Makuhari Messe (Convention) | 140,000 | Convention Stage; JO1, The Wind, TIOT, Wooah, &TEAM |
| May 12, 2024 | Tokyo | Japan | Zozo Marine Stadium (Concert); Makuhari Messe (Convention) | 140,000 | M Countdown Stage; 8Turn, Hi-Fi Un!corn, Illit, Is:sue, Jung Yong-hwa, Me:I, NCT Wish, Taeyeon, Tempest, Xikers, Yena, &TEAM |
| July 26, 2024 | Los Angeles | United States | Crypto.com Arena (Concert); LA Convention Center & Gilbert Lindsay Plaza (Convention) | TBA | Convention Stage; AleXa, INI, Jo Yu-ri, P1Harmony, Zerobaseone |
| July 26, 2024 | Los Angeles | United States | Crypto.com Arena (Concert); LA Convention Center & Gilbert Lindsay Plaza (Convention) | TBA | M Countdown Stage; Bibi, BoyNextDoor, INI, Kep1er, P1Harmony, Taemin; Special appearance: Zerobaseone |
| July 27, 2024 | Los Angeles | United States | Crypto.com Arena (Concert); LA Convention Center & Gilbert Lindsay Plaza (Convention) | TBA | Convention Stage; Bibi, BoyNextDoor, Hyolyn, LØREN, Nmixx; Special appearance: Tiger JK |
| July 27, 2024 | Los Angeles | United States | Crypto.com Arena (Concert); LA Convention Center & Gilbert Lindsay Plaza (Convention) | TBA | M Countdown Stage; Enhypen, g.o.d, Jo Yu-ri, Me:I, Nmixx, TWS; Special appearance: P1Harmony Pre-show: BINI |
| July 28, 2024 | Los Angeles | United States | Crypto.com Arena (Concert); LA Convention Center & Gilbert Lindsay Plaza (Convention) | TBA | Convention Stage; A.C.E, g.o.d, STAYC, TWS |
| July 28, 2024 | Los Angeles | United States | Crypto.com Arena (Concert); LA Convention Center & Gilbert Lindsay Plaza (Convention) | TBA | M Countdown Stage; Jeon So-mi, NCT 127, STAYC, Zerobaseone, Zico; Special appearance: Bibi, Hyolyn, INI, ME:I, TWS |
| September 28, 2024 | Frankfurt | Germany | Messe Frankfurt | TBA | Convention Stage; Dreamcatcher, Lee Young-ji, ONF, izna, The Boyz |
| September 28, 2024 | Frankfurt | Germany | Messe Frankfurt | TBA | M Countdown Stage; Evnne, Illit, JO1, Kiss of Life, Miyeon, Nowadays, The Boyz, Yugyeom |
| September 29, 2024 | Frankfurt | Germany | Messe Frankfurt | TBA | Convention Stage; Kiss of Life, Evnne, Kep1er, Yugyeom, JO1 |
| September 29, 2024 | Frankfurt | Germany | Messe Frankfurt | TBA | M Countdown Stage; Dreamcatcher, izna, Kep1er, Key, Lee Young-ji, Lun8, ONF, Riize |
| May 9, 2025 | Chiba | Japan | Makuhari Messe | 110,000 | Convention Stage; Cravity, Is:sue, Kep1er, Zerobaseone |
| May 9, 2025 | Chiba | Japan | Makuhari Messe | 110,000 | M Countdown Stage; Daesung, Evnne, INI, Is:sue, Jo Yu-ri, KickFlip, TripleS |
| May 10, 2025 | Chiba | Japan | Makuhari Messe | 110,000 | Convention Stage; JO1, ME:I, TripleS, Qwer |
| May 10, 2025 | Chiba | Japan | Makuhari Messe | 110,000 | M Countdown Stage; Boynextdoor, DXTEEN, izna, JO1, Kep1er, P1Harmony, Taemin, Yena |
| May 11, 2025 | Chiba | Japan | Makuhari Messe | 110,000 | Convention Stage; Evnne, Highlight, izna, P1Harmony |
| May 11, 2025 | Chiba | Japan | Makuhari Messe | 110,000 | M Countdown Stage; Cravity, Highlight, KiiiKiii, ME:I, Qwer, TWS, Zerobaseone |
| August 1, 2025 | Los Angeles | United States | Crypto.com Arena (Concert); LA Convention Center | 125,000 | Convention Stage; Cravity, izna, Lee Young-ji |
| August 1, 2025 | Los Angeles | United States | Crypto.com Arena (Concert); LA Convention Center | 125,000 | M Countdown Stage; Is:sue, IVE, Lee Young-ji, NCT 127, Nowz, P1Harmony, Zerobaseone |
| August 2, 2025 | Los Angeles | United States | Crypto.com Arena (Concert); LA Convention Center | 125,000 | Convention Stage; Hwasa, Meovv, Zerobaseone |
| August 2, 2025 | Los Angeles | United States | Crypto.com Arena (Concert); LA Convention Center | 125,000 | M Countdown Stage aespa, Choi Ho-jong, izna, Jackson Wang, JO1, Monsta X, Nmixx, Roy Kim, Yuqi |
| August 3, 2025 | Los Angeles | United States | Crypto.com Arena (Concert); LA Convention Center | 125,000 | Convention Stage; JO1, Kep1er, P1Harmony, Roy Kim |
| August 3, 2025 | Los Angeles | United States | Crypto.com Arena (Concert); LA Convention Center | 125,000 | M Countdown Stage; Cravity, Hwasa, HxW, Kep1er, Key, Meovv, Riize, Zerobaseone |

== See also ==
- HallyuPopFest
- Dream Concert
