= Idol School =

Idol School may refer to:

- Idol School (2014 TV series)
- Idol School (2017 TV series)
