= Idol School (2014 TV series) =

- Genre: Variety
- Country of origin: South Korea
- Original language: Korean
- No. of seasons: 1
- No. of episodes: 17 (until December 16, 2014)

Production
- Production locations: Seoul, South Korea
- Camera setup: Multi camera
- Running time: 45 minutes

Original release
- Network: MBC Music
- Release: 19 August 2014 – present

Idol School (Korean: 아이돌 스쿨) is a South Korean variety show, which aired on MBC Music, MBC's cable and satellite network for music. The show is hosted by Jun Hyun-moo, singer Kim Yeon-woo and Sojin of Girl's Day.

== Corners/Segments ==
- "Manager's Fast Pedal" – Manager of team are turning the pedals. The music filled the team's fastest energy is playing. However, any amount determined by the ability of the manager.
- "Profile Talk" – The hosts feature the profile, info, facts, and rumors about the guest. The idols need to verify, or even, voluntarily prove the info before the MCs. That must appeal to charm in a short period of time. If guest winner the guest get transition stage, stage video and special effects. This is not something you want, when penalties drastically manager.
- "Survival Game" – The guests play a game together with the hosts make a group. If the guest winner will get 10 cameras and show stage, if lost will get 1 camera and pin stage.
- "Survival Show" – A special where the guests have result survival and make a group for performance stage.

== Hosts ==
=== Current hosts ===
- Jun Hyun-moo
- Kim Yeon-woo
- Sojin

== List of Episodes ==
=== 2014 ===
Episodes	Air Date	Featured guests	Remarks
1	August 19, 2014	Topp Dogg, BESTie, HALO	
2	August 26, 2014	Wa$$up, Tiny-G, 100%	
3	September 2, 2014	HALO, BESTie, Wa$$up, Topp Dogg, 100%	Show Stage
4	September 16, 2014	HALO, BESTie, Wa$$up, Topp Dogg, 100%	Show Stage
5	September 23, 2014	100%, Tiny-G, Wa$$up	
6	September 30, 2014	Cross Gene, C-CLOWN, Boys Republic	
7	October 7, 2014	Ladies Code, B.I.G, Tahiti	
8	October 14, 2014	C-CLOWN, Ladies Code, Cross Gene, Boys Republic, B.I.G, Tahiti	Show stage
9	October 21, 2014	C-CLOWN, Ladies Code, Cross Gene, Boys Republic, B.I.G, Tahiti	Show stage
10	October 28, 2014	High4, Laboum, GB9	
11	November 4, 2014	Royal Pirates, EXID, AlphaBat	
12	November 11, 2014	High4, Laboum, EXID, AlphaBat, Royal Pirates, GB9	Show Stage
13	November 18, 2014	High4, Laboum, EXID, AlphaBat, Royal Pirates, GB9	
14	November 25, 2014	Mr. Mr, MADTOWN, MINX	
15	December 2, 2014	Hello Venus, UNIQ, 4TEN	
16	December 9, 2014	Mr. Mr, MADTOWN, MINX, Hello Venus, UNIQ, 4TEN	Christmas special stage
17	December 16, 2014	Mr. Mr, MADTOWN, MINX, Hello Venus, UNIQ, 4TEN	Christmas special stage
