= MBC M =

South Korean television channel

- Country: South Korea
- Broadcast area: South Korea
- Headquarters: Seoul

Programming
- Language: Korean
- Picture format: 1080i HDTV (downscaled to 16:9 480i for the SDTV feed)

Ownership
- Owner: MBC Plus Media

History
- Launched: February 1, 2012; 14 years ago
- Replaced: MBC Game
- Former names: MBC Music (2012-2020)

Links
- Website: MBCPlus.com/Music

Availability

Terrestrial
- Skylife: Channel 102 (HD)

MBC M (formerly MBC Music) (Korean: MBC 엠, 엠비씨 엠) is a South Korean specialty television channel owned by MBC Plus Media. The cable channel primarily broadcasts programming related to music.

It was first announced in July 2011, with the announcement of the shutdown of MBC Game. The channel opened on February 1, 2012, with a new music program Show Champion.

The channel was re-branded on February 2, 2020 as MBC M. The company intends to make the brand more recognizable to the digital audience and build a synergy between television and new media.

== Programs ==
These are MBC M's currently airing programs:

=== Reality programming ===
- Astro Project
- We Got Married (simulcast with MBC TV.)
- Dad, Where Are You Going? (simulcast with MBC TV.)
- Infinite Challenge (simulcast with MBC TV.)
- Oh! My Skarf
- Making of The Star
- Kara Project
- Secret no.1
- Music and Lyrics
- NC.A in Fukuoka
- Idol School
- Ailee's Vitamin
- Younha's Come to My Home
- Powder Room
- Abbey Road
- Gangnam Feel Dance School
- One Fine Day (2013–present)
  - Shinee's One Fine Day (2013)
  - B1A4’s One Fine Day (2014)
  - VIXX's One Fine Day (2014)
  - Super Junior's One Fine Day (2015)
  - Girl's Day's One Fine Day (2015)
  - GFriend's One Fine Day (2015)
  - AOA's One Fine Day (2015)
  - B.A.P's One Fine Day (2016)
  - Seventeen's One Fine Day (2016-2017)
- Gugudan Project - Extreme School Trip (2016)
- B.I.G Project (2017)
- Idol Tour (2017)
- Seventeen Project: Debut Big Plan (2015)

=== Music programming ===
- Show! Music Core (Simulcast with MBC-TV.)
- I Music U (no commercial breaks)
  - I Music U 4 AM
  - I Music U 7 AM
  - I Music U 8 AM
  - I Music U 3 PM
  - I Music U 6 PM
  - I Music U 10 PM
  - I Music U Request
- Daily Best K-pop
- Show Champion (Simulcast live with MBC every1.)
- All The K-pop
- Music Talk Talk My Bling Bling MV
- Old and New
- KPOP Live
- Music Magazine
- Morning Pop
- Music Scanner The Code
- Hot Track
- Live Clip
- MP4
- Shh!

=== Special programming ===
- Super Show 5 - A reality television documentary on the South America leg of the tour narrated by member Kangin, broadcast, from 13 June 2013, for six weeks.
- MelOn Music Awards (2010–2017, simulcast on MBC Every 1)

== See also ==
- Mnet
- SBS M
