= Idol Tour =

- Genre: Travel; Variety
- Starring: Joosuc; Jisook; DinDin
- Country of origin: South Korea
- Original language: Korean
- No. of seasons: 1
- No. of episodes: 12

Production
- Production location: South Korea
- Running time: 60 minutes

Original release
- Network: MBC Music
- Release: July 20 – October 28, 2017

Idol Tour (Korean: 아이돌 투어) is a 2017 South Korean television program starring Joosuc, Jisook and DinDin. It airs on MBC Music on Thursday at 22:00 (KST) beginning 20 July 2017. From 2 September 2017, it will be aired on Saturday at 10:30 (KST).

It is a variety show made to provide busy idols with a healing vacation. Every week, the cast and guests (mainly 2 members of an idol group) go for a tour in a city around South Korea, through 2 teams (1 team leader and 1 member of the idol group in a team, the guests will change team leader during the episode). In each episode, at some spots the 2 teams go around separately, other times the 2 teams alongside the CEO (Joosuc) gather together to tour spots. At the end of each episode, a best tour guide is chosen through voting from the 2 guests and the CEO.

== Cast ==
- Joosuc (CEO)
- Jisook (Team Leader)
- DinDin (Team Leader)

== Episodes ==
=== 2017 ===
Episode #	Broadcast Date	Place(s)	Guests	Winning Tour Guide	Note(s)
1	July 20, 2017	Yeosu	Dal Shabet (Serri, Subin)	Jisook	
2	July 27, 2017	Chuncheon	Cross Gene (Shin, Takuya)	Joosuc	Jisook is the CEO for this episode
3	August 3, 2017	Busan	Momoland (JooE, Nancy)	Jisook	
4	August 10, 2017	Gangneung, Samcheok	April (Chaekyung, Rachel)	DinDin	
5	September 2, 2017	Incheon	Fiestar (Cao Lu, Yezi)	Joosuc	DinDin is the CEO for this episode
6	September 9, 2017	Suwon	Pentagon (Hui, Hongseok)	Jisook	
7	September 16, 2017	Seoul (Gangnam)	B.I.G (Benji, Gunmin)	DinDin	
8	September 23, 2017	South Chungcheong Province (Asan, Seosan, Dangjin)	Paradise (Sungchan, Seungjin), LIPBUBBLE (Eunbyeol, Ina); Special Guests: Frost (Lee Hyun, Jee Young-il), Notice (Isaiah, Kim Do-wan), Viva (Yeji, Lia), S2 (Dohee, Yoojeong)	Jisook	1. First episode to have 2 idols in a team 2. Special guests appeared only for the Idol Log Rolling Game
9	September 30, 2017	Daejeon	Hotshot (Junhyuk, Timoteo)	DinDin	
10	October 7, 2017	South Chungcheong Province (Taean, Seosan, Asan, Dangjin)	Myteen (Eunsu, Song Yuvin)	Jisook	
11	October 21, 2017	Gyeonggi Province (Pyeongtaek, Seongnam, Namyangju, Guri, Hanam)	Hello Venus (Seoyoung, Yeoreum)	DinDin	
12	October 28, 2017	Seoul	JBJ (Kim Sang-gyun, Kim Dong-han)	Jisook	
