= Toy (South Korean band) =

South Korean band

- Origin: Seoul, South Korea
- Genres: K-pop, electronica
- Years active: 1994–present
- Label: Antenna Music
- Members: You Hee-yeol, Hahm Choon-ho, Song Sung-kyung
- Past members: Yoon Jeong-oh; Kim Yeon-woo
- Website: toymusic.co.kr

Toy (Korean: 토이) is a one-man project band of Korean pop singer-songwriter and pianist You Hee-yeol.

== Career ==
Toy started as a duo of You Hee-yeol and Yoon Jeong-oh, and was named after their two initials 'Y', as in Two + Y = Toy.

However, after releasing Toy's debut album, Yoon Jeong-oh left the band to study overseas and You Hee-yeol joined the navy for his mandatory military service. You Hee-yeol has been the sole member of Toy since 1996.

After his discharge from military service, You released Toy's second studio album Yooheeyeol. The title song "Remember I Was Next to You" (Korean: 내가 너의 곁에 잠시 살았다는 걸; RR: Naega neoui gyeote jamsi saratdaneun geol), sung by Kim Yeon-woo, became a big hit and the album was a commercial success.

In 1997, Toy released the third studio album Present and also started a record label named Toy Music (currently Antenna). After a six-year hiatus from Fermata (2001), the band released their sixth studio album Thank You, with the title song "A Passionate Goodbye" (뜨거운 안녕; Tteugeoun annyeong) featuring vocals by E Z Hyoung.

== Discography ==
=== Studio albums ===
Title	Album details	Peak chart positions		Sales
Title	Album details	KOR RIAK	KOR Gaon	Sales
Inside My Heart (내 마음속에)	Released: October 24, 1994; Label: BAY Studio; Formats: CD, cassette; Track listing: 1. 어린날; 2. 내 마음속에; 3. 이젠 웃어봐; 4. 내가 너의 곁에; 5. 세검정; 6. 널 잊게 된 날부터; 7. In your face 8. 바보같이 나는; 9. 햇빛 비추는 날 10. Good night	(Note: The Recording Industry Association of Korea album chart was established in 1998.)	(Note: The Gaon Music Chart was established in 2010.)	(Note: Data not available)
YOUHEEYEOL	Released: February 8, 1996; Labels: King Records, Shinnara Music; Formats: CD, cassette; Track listing: 1. 사랑, 집착 & 중독; 2. 내가 너의 곁에 잠시 살았다는 걸 3. 그럴때마다; 4. 슬픈 이야기; 5. 흑백사진; 6. 23번째 생일; 7. 첫 Kiss; 8. 어른들을 위한 동화; 9. Billy's Bar; 10. 이사가던 날 11. 취중독백; 12. 그럴때마다 Part 2	(Note: The Recording Industry Association of Korea album chart was established in 1998.)	(Note: The Gaon Music Chart was established in 2010.)	(Note: Data not available)
Present	Released: October 15, 1997; Labels: Samsung Music; Formats: CD, cassette; Track listing: 1. 선물 part I (Melody); 2. 바램; 3. 고백; 4. 넌 어떠니; 5. 애주가; 6. 외로움(이혼한 부모님을 가진 아이들에게); 7. 다시 시작하기; 8. 선물 part II (Memory); 9. 말다툼; 10. 마지막 로맨티스트; 11. 선물 part III (Story...); 12. 스무살 너의 이야기	(Note: The Recording Industry Association of Korea album chart was established in 1998.)	(Note: The Gaon Music Chart was established in 2010.)	(Note: Data not available)
A Night in Seoul	Released: January 6, 1999; Label: Samsung Music, E&E Media; Formats: CD, cassette; Track listing: 1. A Night In Seoul; 2. 거짓말 같은 시간; 3. 구애; 4. 새벽 그림; 5. 여전히 아름다운지; 6. 우리는 어쩌면 만약에; 7. 혼자 있는 시간; 8. 못다한 나의 이야기; 9. 길에서 만나다; 10. 저녁식사; 11. Please; 12. 스케치북; 13. 남겨진 사람들; 14. Lullaby	4	(Note: The Gaon Music Chart was established in 2010.)	KOR: 174,606
Fermata	Released: May 10, 2001; Labels: Universal Music Korea; Formats: CD, cassette; Track listing: 1. Fermata; 2. 그대 먼 곳만 보네요; 3. 좋은 사람; 4. 내가 남자친구라면; 5. 언젠가 우리 다시 만나면; 6. 안녕 이제는 안녕; 7. Complex; 8. 그 끝에 너 9. 목소리; 10. 첫사랑; 11. 기다립니다; 12. 마지막 노래; 13. 잊진 않았겠죠?; 14. 소박했던, 행복했던...; 15. 두 사람; 16. 모두 어디로 간걸까; 17. 좋은 사람 (Sad Story); 18. 미안해	2	(Note: The Gaon Music Chart was established in 2010.)	KOR: 297,852
Thank You	Released: November 29, 2007; Labels: Antenna Music, Mnet Media; Formats: CD; Track listing: 1. You (Intro.); 2. Bon Voyage; 3. 나는 달 4. 해피엔드; 5. 뜨거운 안녕; 6. 오늘 서울은 하루종일 맑음; 7. 스치다 ...Interlude; 8. 크리스마스 카드; 9. 딸에게 보내는 노래; 10. 그대, 모든 짐은 내게; 11. 프랑지파니; 12. 투명인간; 13. 안녕 스무살; 14. 인사; 15. You; 16. 히든 트랙	1	(Note: The Gaon Music Chart was established in 2010.)	KOR: 81,891
Da Capo	Released: November 18, 2014; Labels: Antenna Music, CJ E&M Music; Formats: CD, digital download, streaming	(Note: The Recording Industry Association of Korea album chart was discontinued in 2008.)	2	KOR: 42,934

=== Live albums ===
- Toy Live (2001)

=== Compilation albums ===
- The History of Toy (2001)

== Awards ==
=== Korean Music Awards ===
Year	Category	Work	Result
2009	Musician of the Year	—N/a	Won
2009	Best Pop Song	"A Passionate Goodbye"	Won

=== Mnet Asian Music Awards ===
Year	Category	Work	Result
2008	Album of the Year	Thank You	Nominated
2008	Best Male Artist	"Rockin' On Heaven's Door"	Nominated
