= Kim Yeon-woo =

South Korean singer (born 1971)

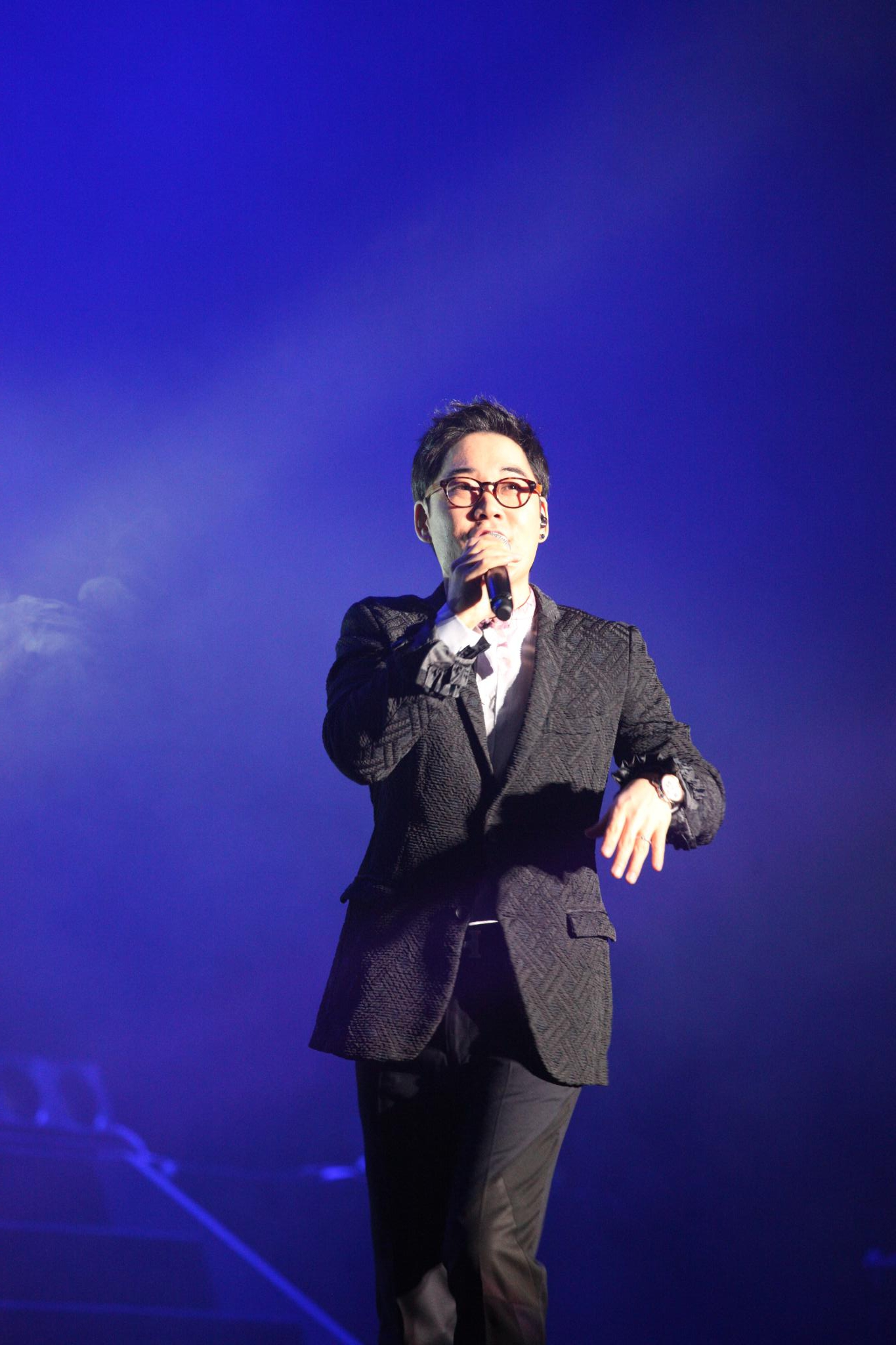
- Kim in November 2011

Background information
- Born: Kim Hak-chul; July 22, 1971 (age 55)
- Origin: South Korea
- Genres: Ballad, dance
- Occupations: Singer; professor; vocal coach
- Instruments: Piano, guitar, melodica
- Years active: 1996–present
- Labels: Poibos; IO Music/EMI; Adio/Manwaldang Music; Mystic89 /LOEN(2013-2016); Dio Music/LOEN(2016–present)
- Spouse: Unknown (m. 2010)

Korean name
- Hangul: 김학철
- Hanja: 金學哲
- RR: Gim Hakcheol
- MR: Kim Hakch'ŏl

Stage name
- Hangul: 김연우
- Hanja: 金煙雨
- RR: Gim Yeonu
- MR: Kim Yŏnu

Kim Hak-chul, better known by his stage name Kim Yeon-woo (Korean: 김연우; born July 22, 1971) is a South Korean male singer, vocal coach, and professor at Seoul Arts College. Nicknamed God of Vocals, he is well known for his ballads, smooth singing voice, and ability to hit high notes without difficulty. Kim recorded a number of hit ballads with the South Korean band, Toy, in the mid-to-late 1990s, gathering a sizable cult following. In 2011, Kim achieved widespread fame and recognition in South Korea through his participation on I Am a Singer, along with numerous appearances on variety and entertainment shows.

== Career ==
After completing his military service in the Air Force, Kim Yeon-woo participated in the 7th Annual Yoo Jae-ha Music Competition and won the gold prize. In 1996, Kim Yeon-woo became the featured vocal of You Hee-yeol's project band Toy and adopted his stage name Kim Yeon-woo, which was the name of a café You Hee-yeol frequented. You had felt that Kim's birth name Kim Hak-chul did not suit him. They went on to record a number of hits such as Still Beautiful and Remember I Was Next to You.

Since leaving Toy, Kim Yeon-woo has released five solo full albums and two mini albums.

In 2010, Kim was noted in the media thanks to a video of him performing at a university concert back in 2007. He performed in the heavy rain while holding an umbrella, after all the other guest singers had reportedly quit. Because of this, the title of Kim's national concert tour in the summer of 2011 was Yeon-woo in the Rain.

In 2011, Kim was a participant in I Am a Singer. He performed two songs before being voted off. The day after his elimination, the second (and last) song he sang in the contest became number 1 on all music charts in Korea. Kim's popularity started to rise, and he gained widespread recognition from the public, earning the nickname God of Vocals. He also found success in two other guest appearances in the contest. His duet with Kim Kyung Ho was ranked second, and during the Australian contest/concert of the show, Kim was voted first.

In 2012, Kim participated in the second season of I Am a Singer. This time he was not voted off, and was able to earn honorary graduation by the end of the contest.

In 2015, Kim sang a duet with Yangpa in the third season of I Am a Singer. The performance was ranked first. Kim's popularity rose even more thanks to his participation in King of Mask Singer. Under the stage name CBR Cleopatra, he became the first male Mask King, as well as the first long-term Mask King, staying on the show for 10 consecutive weeks.

Kim is also well known as a vocal trainer. His former students include SG Wannabe's Lee Seok-hoon, Big Mama's Lee Young-hyun, and Brown Eyed Girls' JeA.

== Personal life ==
Kim studied practical music at Seoul Institute of the Arts.

Kim's best friends include You Hee-yeol, Kim Kyung-ho, and Muzie. He is also close with Sung Si-kyung and K.Will.

Several K-pop idols such as B1A4's Sandeul, Shinee's Onew, and VIXX's Ken have mentioned Kim as their role model.

In 2010, Kim married the daughter of a president of a Korean corporation. At the wedding, You Hee-yeol was the master of ceremonies and Sung Si-kyung was the wedding singer.

== Discography ==
=== Studio albums ===
Title	Album details	Peak chart positions	Sales
Title	Album details	KOR	Sales
Only Me Beside You... (그대 곁엔 나밖에...)	Released: March 1, 1998; Label: Danal Entertainment; Formats: CD, cassette	—	
Couple (연인)	Released: January 6, 2004; Label: IO Music; Formats: CD, cassette	24	KOR: 25,729
Missing Love (사랑을 놓치다)	Released: January 17, 2006; Label: Antenna; Formats: CD, cassette	21	KOR: 2,359
Mr. Big	Released: November 24, 2011; Label: Dio Music; Formats: CD, digital download	11	KOR: 5,536
Forever Yours (나의 너)	Released: May 10, 2018; Label: Dio Music; Formats: CD, digital download	17	KOR: 2,356
"—" denotes release did not chart. Note: The Gaon Album Chart was established in 2010. All peak chart positions are from 2010 or later.

=== Extended plays ===
Title	Album details	Peak chart positions	Sales
Title	Album details	KOR	Sales
Jeong (정)(情)	Released: January 5, 2010; Label: Noah Entertainment; Formats: CD, digital download	8	
Move	Released: May 28, 2014; Label: Mystic89; Formats: CD, digital download	19	KOR: 2,568

=== Singles ===
Title	Year	Peak chart positions	Sales (Digital)	Album
Title	Year	KOR	Sales (Digital)	Album
"Only Me Beside You" (그대곁엔 나밖에)	1998	—		Only Me Beside You
"Couple" (연인)	2004	—		Couple
"Love, That Common Word" (사랑한다는 흔한 말)	2006	59	KOR: 225,337	Missing Love
"I'll Give My Life With You" (지금 만나러 갑니다) (feat. Tablo)	2008	—		non-album single
"Chukga" (축가)(祝歌)	2010	—		Jeong
"I Was Happy...Take Care" (행복했다...안녕)	2011	13	KOR: 893,680	Mr. Big
"Not A Popular Song" (인기없던노래) (with Don Spike)	2012	29	KOR: 186,014	non-album single
"No Schedule" (with Yoon Jong-shin)	2013	49	KOR: 44,397	Monthly Project 2013 Yoon Jong Shin
"Antidote" (해독제)	2014	28	KOR: 130,818	Move
"Move" (feat. Park Kyung of Block B)	2014	42	KOR: 87,786	Move
"Melt Away" (눈물고드름)	2014	84	KOR: 42,936	non-album singles
"Ariyo" (그리운 노래 아리요)	2015	66	KOR: 26,794	non-album singles
"My Apology Letter" (반성문)	2018	—		Forever Yours
"—" denotes release did not chart. Note: The Gaon Digital Chart was established in 2010. All peak chart positions are from 2010 or later.

=== Other charted songs ===
Title	Year	Peak chart positions	Sales (Digital)	Album
Title	Year	KOR	Sales (Digital)	Album
"Sometimes I Cry Alone" (가끔은 혼자 웁니다)	2010	44		Bad Guy OST
"Lingering Affection" (미련)	2011	10	KOR: 704,342	I Am a Singer: 3-1
"If You Are Like Me" (나와 같다면)	2011	1	KOR: 2,219,404	I Am a Singer: 3-2
"You Are My Love"	2011	24	KOR: 528,778	Lie to Me OST
"My Love By My Side" (내사랑 내곁에)	2011	8	KOR: 864,710	I Am a Singer: 호주 특별 공연
"I Miss a Thing" (그립다)	2011	91	KOR: 81,877	Mr. Big
"Withdrawal Symptoms" (금단현상)	2011	89	KOR: 89,111	Mr. Big
"Winter Love" (겨울애)	2011	78	KOR: 103,517	Mr. Big
"Fragment" (부스러기)	2011	77	KOR: 107,554	Mr. Big
"Closer" (더 가까이)	2011	5	KOR: 961,381	Brain OST
"In The Shade of the Street Tree" (가로수 그늘 아래 서면)	2012	55	KOR: 60,112	I Am a Singer 2: 5월 13일
"You Let Me Go With A Smile" (미소를 띄우며 나를 보낸 그 모습처럼)	2012	89	KOR: 37,128	I Am a Singer 2: 5월 27일
"Though I Loved You" (사랑했지만)	2012	85	KOR: 46,518	I Am a Singer 2: 7월의 가수전
"This Is The Moment" (지금 이 순간)	2012	91	KOR: 40,764	I Am a Singer 2: 9월 A조 경연
"You In My Mind" (그대 내 품에)	2012	86	KOR: 41,516	I Am a Singer 2: 9월의 가수전
"Addicted to Love" (중독된 사랑)	2012	82	KOR: 45,425	I Am a Singer 2: 10월 A조 경연
"Because It's You" (그대라서)	2013	29	KOR: 97,656	Nine OST
"Running In The Sky" (하늘을달리다) (with Yangpa)	2015	95	KOR: 16,598	I Am a Singer 3: 6회 듀엣미션
"To Be With You"	2015	51	KOR: 90,411	The Producers OST

== Other activities ==
=== Variety and competition shows ===
Year	Title	Episode(s)	Role	Notes
2011	I Am a Singer (Season 1)	6–9	Contestant	
2011	I Am a Singer (Season 1)	32	Contestant	
2012	I Am a Singer (Season 2)	1–28	Contestant	Honorary graduation
2014	Cool Kiz on the Block	45–52	Member	
2014	Idol School	1–17	Host	
2015	King of Mask Singer	7–16	Contestant	As CBR Cleopatra
2015	Hidden Singer (Season 4)	8	Singer/Contestant	
2015	The Racer	1–8	Member	
2016	Superstar K	1–10	Judge	
2021	The Masked Talent	MBC Chuseok's special	Judge	MBC
2022	Fantastic Family			SBS

=== Dramas ===
Year	Title	Role
2012	Standby	Main cast (as Kim Yeon-woo)
2017	A Korean Odyssey	Cameo (Ep. 1)
2019	Welcome to Waikiki 2	Cameo (Ep. 6)

=== Awards ===
Year	Award	Category
1995	7th Annual Yoo Jae-ha Music Competition	Gold Prize
2015	MBC Entertainment Awards	Excellence Award in Music/Talk Show
