= Shu-I =

South Korean boy band

SHU-I (슈아이) (So Hot Union of Idols), also known as Super Tribe, was a South Korean five member boy band. They debuted on September 11, 2009, with their digital single “Bomb Bomb Bomb”. Before that they had been training for two years together. Their name SHU-I can translate into the Mandarin word shuai (帥) which means handsome. They were mainly active in Japan.

== Members ==
- Hwang Inseok (Hangul: 황인석)
- Jun Changhyun (준창현)
- Park Hyungjun (박형준)
- Park Minho (박민호)
- Park Jinseok (박진석)

== Information ==
=== Debut ===
SHU-I prepared and trained to debut for two years. The group' members had already revealed their faces on various broadcast shows such as JinShil Game, Introducing A Star Friend, and Kkochminam Alongsatae, before their debut. They officially debuted with the digital single "BOMB BOMB BOMB" on 11 September 2009, and shortly after they were chosen as Rookie of the Greatest Potential for the month of November by the Agency of Korean creative content.

=== Japanese Debut ===
In January 2011, the group debuted in Japan with the mini-album STAR LIGHT under avex' independent sub-label Rhythm REPUBLIC. By the time of the release of the mini-album their official Japanese website already announced SHU-I's major debut in May 2011 under avex trax.

=== Korean Comeback ===
Early June, 2013, it was revealed that the group will be making their long-awaited return to Korea with the release of their first mini album.

=== Disbandment ===
It was announced on the group's official homepage, August 16, 2015, that the group is disbanding and members Inseok, Changhyun, and Minho will be beginning their mandatory military service next year. “After the three of them complete their service, they hope to be active in Japan,” the notice says.

While the three members are planning to start again in a new group when they return, remaining members Hyunjoon and Jinseok are taking a different path.

== Discography ==
=== Korean discography ===
==== Mini-album ====
- [2013.07.25] Mini Album Vol.1

==== Digital single ====
- [2009.09.11] Bomb Bomb Bomb

=== Japanese discography ===
==== Album ====
- [2012.07.15] Nextage
- [2015.03.25] I-Dream

==== Mini-album ====
- [2011.01.26] Star Light (indies)

==== Singles ====
- [2011.05.04] Smile For Me
- [2011.08.17] Summer Sweet / Kizuna (キズナ)
- [2011.12.07] Never Give Up Yeah! (ネバギバ Yeah!)
- [2012.04.11] Don't Be Down
- [2012.11.21] Daigyakuten (大逆転)
- [2013.03.13] Achakocha Sorry (あちゃこちゃSorry)
- [2013.11.25] So In Luv
- [2014.06.30] Kon'nani kimi o sukinanoni dōshite? (こんなに君を好きなのにどうして?)
- [2014.12.15] Mirai e (未来へ)
