= High4 =

South Korean boyband

- Origin: Seoul, South Korea
- Genres: K-pop; dance-pop; R&B
- Years active: 2014–2017
- Labels: N.A.P
- Spinoffs: High4 20/20Wave
- Past members: Sunggu; Alex; Myunghan; Youngjun
- Website: napenter.com

High4 (Korean: 하이포; stylized as HIGH4) was a South Korean boy band under the management of N.A.P Entertainment. The group consisted of members Alex, Myunghan, and Youngjun. They officially debuted into the Korean entertainment industry on April 8, 2014 with the song "Not Spring, Love, or Cherry Blossoms" featuring IU. On January 31, 2017, it was announced that leader Sunggu would be leaving the group.

On August 16, 2017, Alex announced on his Instagram live that the members have gone their separate ways and they would have their own solo activities, confirming the disbandment of High4.

== Members ==
=== Former ===
- Sunggu (성구)
- Alex (알렉스)
- Myunghan (명한)
- Youngjun (영준)

== Discography ==
=== Extended plays ===
Title	Album Details	Peak chart positions		Sales
Title	Album Details	KOR	JPN	Sales
Korean
Hi High	Released: August 27, 2014; Label: N.A.P. Entertainment, LOEN Entertainment; Formats: CD, digital download; Track listing: 1. Say Yes; 2. Headache (뱅뱅뱅); 3. True Love; 4. Time Out; 5. A Little Closer (해요 말고 해) feat. Lim Kim; 6. Not Spring, Love, or Cherry Blossoms (봄 사랑 벚꽃 말고) with IU	12	—N/a	KOR: 1,162
Blessed	Released: February 28, 2017; Label: N.A.P. Entertainment, LOEN Entertainment; Formats: CD, digital download; Track listing: 1. Live, Love, Life intro 2. Love Line; 3. Ooh Girl; 4. Pray (기도해); 5. Last Summer (네가 없을 뿐인데)	6	—N/a	KOR: 6,320
Japanese
High Five	Released: February 8, 2015; Label: N.A.P. Entertainment; Formats: CD, digital download; Track listing: 1. Day By Day (Japanese ver.); 2. Headache (Japanese ver.); 3. A Little Closer feat. Lim Kim; 4. Not Spring, Love, or Cherry Blossoms feat. IU; 5. Day By Day; 6. Headache	—N/a	—	—N/a
Hi Summer	Released: July 11, 2015; Label: N.A.P. Entertainment; Formats: CD, digital download; Track listing: 1. Baby Boy (Japanese ver.); 2. True Love (Japanese ver.); 3. Day By Day (Japanese ver.); 4. Baby Boy; 5. True Love; 6. Day By Day inst.	—N/a	—	—N/a
"—" denotes releases that did not chart or were not released in that region.

=== Single albums ===
Title	Album details	Peak chart positions	Sales
Title	Album details	KOR	Sales
HookGA (as High4:20)	Released: October 3, 2016; Label: N.A.P Entertainment, LOEN Entertainment; Formats: CD, digital download; Track listing: 1. HookGA (Hook가)feat. Hwasa; 2. Weekend	10	KOR: 2,875

=== Singles ===
Title	Year	Peak chart positions			Sales	Album
Title	Year	KOR	KOR Hot	US World	Sales	Album
"Not Spring, Love, or Cherry Blossoms" (봄 사랑 벚꽃 말고) (feat. IU)	2014	1	1	21	KOR: 2,763,793	Hi High
"A Little Closer" (해요 말고 해) (with Lim Kim)	2014	29	—	—	KOR: 95,715	Hi High
"Headache" (뱅뱅뱅)	2014	171	—	—	KOR: 11,782	Hi High
"Day by Day" (비슷해)	2015	—	—	—	KOR: 14,653	Non-album singles
"Baby Boy"	2015	—	—	—	KOR: 5,411	Non-album singles
"D.O.A. (Dead or Alive)"	2015	—	—	—		Non-album singles
"Until We Live in the Same Sky" (하나의 하늘에 사는 날까지)	2016	—	—	—		Non-album singles
"Love Line"	2017	—	—	—		Blessed
HIGH4:20 / 20WAVE (sub-unit)
"HookGA" (as High4:20, feat. Hwasa)	2016	—	—	—		HookGA
"Boomerang" (as 20Wave)	2024	—	—	—		Boomerang
"—" denotes releases that did not chart or were not released in that region.

== Awards and nominations ==
Award	Year	Category	Nominated work	Result	Ref.
Gaon Chart Music Awards	2015	Song of the Year – April	"Not Spring, Love, or Cherry Blossoms" (feat. IU)	Nominated	
Golden Disc Awards	2015	Digital Song Bonsang	"Not Spring, Love, or Cherry Blossoms" (feat. IU)	Nominated	
Golden Disc Awards	2015	Rookie of the Year	"Not Spring, Love, or Cherry Blossoms" (feat. IU)	Nominated	
Melon Music Awards	2014	Best Ballad	"Not Spring, Love, or Cherry Blossoms" (feat. IU)	Nominated	
Melon Music Awards	2014	Hot Trend Award	"Not Spring, Love, or Cherry Blossoms" (feat. IU)	Nominated	

== Music programs win ==
=== Inkigayo ===
Year	Date	Song
2014	May 11	"Not Spring, Love, or Cherry Blossoms"
