= 4Ten =

South Korean girl group

4TEN
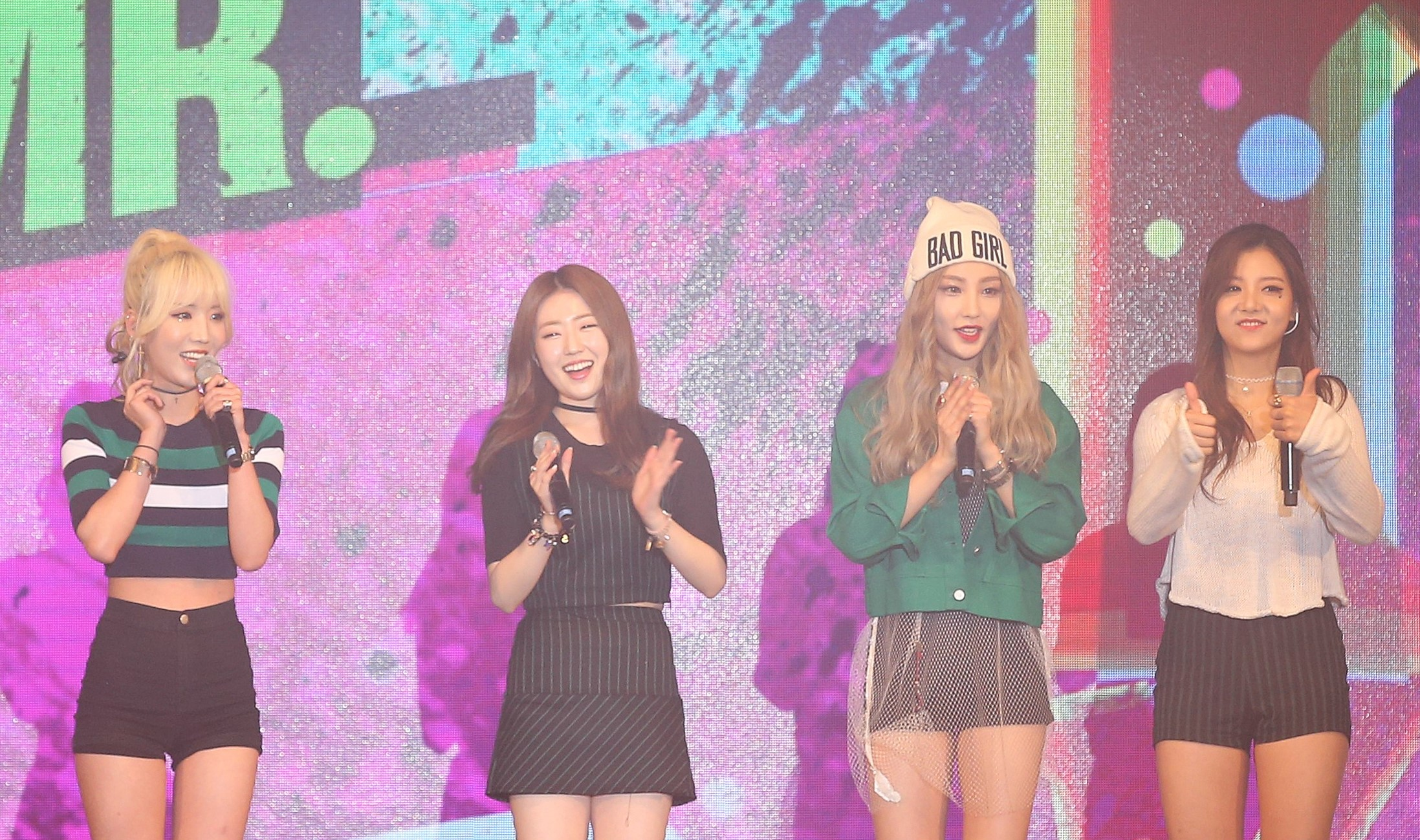
- 4TEN at Hello, Mr K! Concert, in April 2016

Background information
- Also known as: POTEN
- Origin: Seoul, South Korea
- Genres: K-pop; Dance-pop; Hip hop
- Years active: 2014–2016
- Label: Jungle Entertainment
- Past members: TEM; Eujin; Hajeong; Yun; Hyeji; Hyejin; Heeo

4Ten (Korean: 포텐, formerly POTEN), commonly stylized as 4TEN, is a South Korean girl group formed by Jungle Entertainment in 2014. The final lineup consisted of three members: Hyeji, Hyejin and Heeo.

== Name ==
The group debuted under the name 4TEN in 2014. The name comes from the word "potential".

In 2015, the group changed their name to POTEN after having revealed a new line-up with five members. The new name also has the same acronym of their original name. The group later changed their name back to 4TEN after continuing as quartet.

== Career ==
=== 2014–2015: Debut with "Tornado", "Why", Line-up changes and "Go Easy" ===
4Ten released their debut single, "Tornado", on August 26, 2014. The group made their official debut stage on Mnet's M Countdown two days later, on August 28.

4Ten released their second digital single, "Why", on January 5, 2015. They performed their comeback stage on KBS2's Music Bank. The music video for the song was shot in New York City.

On June 19, Jungle Entertainment announced that TEM and Eujin had left the group, and that the group was adding three new members: Heeo, Yun and Hajeong. The group also changed their name to Poten. They released their third digital single, "Go Easy", on July 3, 2015, and performed the next day at Yongsan Garrison for the annual 4th of July celebration.

=== 2016: Hajeong's departure, Jack of All Trades and Yun's surgery ===
In early 2016, member Hajeong made her departure and the group continued on as a quartet under name 4TEN.

On February 23, 4Ten released their first mini-album Jack of All Trades. The same day, they had their comeback stage on SBS M's The Show.

On September 11, Yun announced through a hand-written letter on the groups fancafe that she was soon to get surgery, which she revealed was the reason for a delayed comeback. In the letter she explained that she had suffered from neck pain before debuting with 4Ten. The surgery took place on September 27 and was confirmed to have gone well, with Yun started recovering without any complications.

=== 2017–present: Line-Up changes, 'Mix Nine' and Makestar ===
4Ten was inactive for almost a year after their Severely promotions finished in fall 2016.

After not seeing Yun participate on Mix Nine and an absence from the group for more than a year, it has been assumed that she has left. She has also not been a part of recent promotions for their comeback.

During November and December 2017, Jungle Entertainment trainee Jisoo, 4Ten members Hyeji, Hyejin and Heeo were participating on YG's survival show Mix Nine but were eliminated.

In March 2018, it was announced that the group would be having a comeback, and that they had launched a Makestar project to gauge interest. The project hit 118% funding but nothing was ever released.

== Members ==
=== Former ===
- TEM (탬)
- Eujin (유진)
- Hajeong (하정)
- Yun (윤)
- Jeong Hye-ji (정혜지)
- Kwak Hee-o (곽히오)
- Baek Hye-jin (백혜진)

== Discography ==
=== Extended plays ===
Title	Album details	Peak chart positions	Sales
Title	Album details	KOR	Sales
Jack of All Trades	Released: February 23, 2016; Label: Jungle Entertainment, CJ E&M; Formats: CD, digital download; Track listing: 1. Tornado (토네이도); 2. Why (왜 이래); 3. OOO; 4. Go Easy (살살해); 5. Severely (지독하게)	42	KOR: 672+
"—" denotes releases that did not chart or were not released in that region.

=== Singles ===
Title	Year	Peak chart positions	Sales (DL)	Album
Title	Year	KOR	Sales (DL)	Album
"Tornado" (토네이도)	2014	—	—N/a	Jack of All Trades
"Why" (왜 이래)	2015	—	—N/a	Jack of All Trades
"Go Easy" (살살해)	2015	—	KOR: 5,081	Jack of All Trades
"Severely" (지독하게)	2016	—	KOR: 5,002	Jack of All Trades
"—" denotes releases that did not chart or were not released in that region.
