= Ladies' Code discography =

List of releases by Ladies' Code

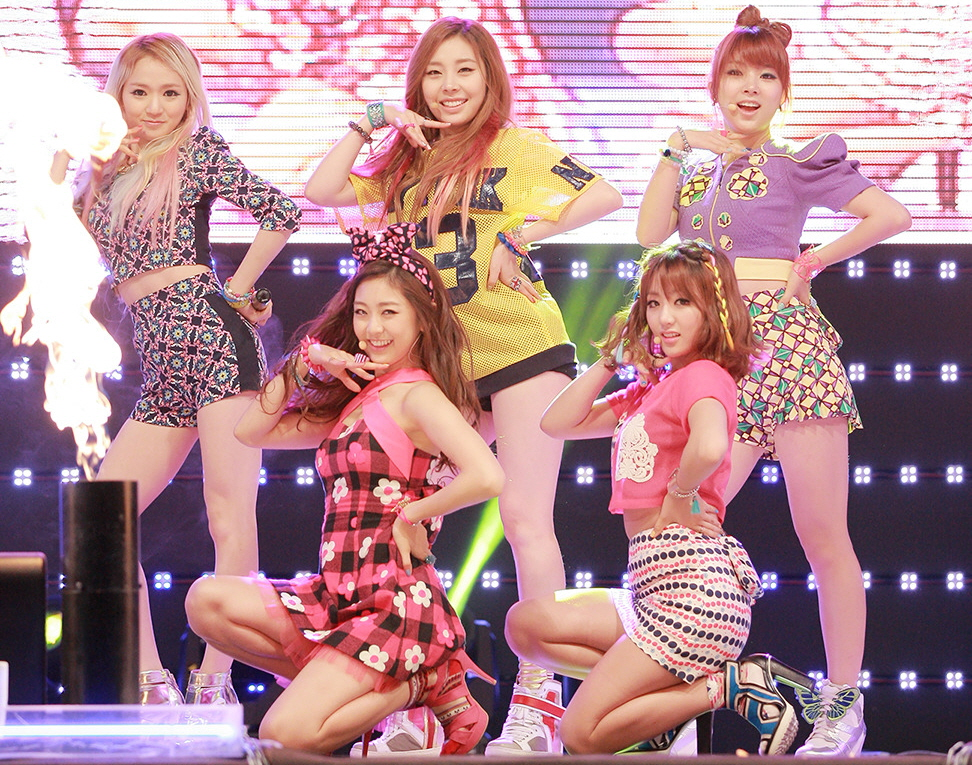
- Ladies' Code in October 2013
- EPs: 4
- Soundtrack albums: 1
- Singles: 11
- Music videos: 12

The discography of South Korean girl group Ladies' Code consists of four extended plays, two single albums and eleven singles.

== Extended plays ==
Title	Details	Peak chart positions	Sales
Title	Details	KOR	Sales
Code#01 Bad Girl (CODE#01 나쁜여자)	Released: March 7, 2013; Label: Polaris Entertainment, CJ E&M; Format: CD, digital download	11	KOR: 2,531+
Code#02 Pretty Pretty	Released: September 6, 2013; Label: Polaris Entertainment, CJ E&M; Format: CD, digital download	14	KOR: 4,514+
Strang3r	Released: October 13, 2016; Label: Polaris Entertainment, Universal Music; Format: CD, digital download	16	KOR: 2,227+
Code#03 Set Me Free	Released: October 10, 2019; Label: Polaris Entertainment, NHN Bugs; Format: CD, digital download; Tracks list: 1. Set Me Free; 2. New Day; 3. Never Ending Story; 4. Jasmine; 5. Feedback (너의 대답은)	35	KOR: 1,769

== Single albums ==
Title	Details	Peak chart positions	Sales
Title	Details	KOR	Sales
Kiss Kiss	Released: August 7, 2014; Label: Polaris Entertainment, LOEN Entertainment; Format: CD, digital download	4	KOR: 2,701+
Myst3ry	Released: February 24, 2016; Label: Polaris Entertainment, Universal Music; Format: CD, digital download	14	KOR: 2,992+

== Singles ==
Title	Year	Peak chart positions			Sales	Album
Title	Year	KOR	KOR Hot.	US World	Sales	Album
"Bad Girl" (나쁜여자)	2013	34	45	—	KOR (DL): 383,265+	Code#01 Bad Girl
"Hate You"	2013	13	24	—	KOR (DL): 134,401+	Code#02 Pretty Pretty
"Pretty Pretty" (예뻐 예뻐)	2013	16	24	—	KOR (DL): 811,176+	Code#02 Pretty Pretty
"So Wonderful"	2014	14	18	—	KOR (DL): 392,842+	Non-album single
"Kiss Kiss"	2014	50	—N/a	21	KOR (DL): 130,243+	Kiss Kiss
"I'll Smile, Even If It Hurts" (아파도 웃을래)	2015	18	—N/a	—	KOR (DL): 124,280+	Non-album single
"Galaxy"	2016	36	—N/a	9	KOR (DL): 114,590+	Myst3ry
"The Rain"	2016	—	—N/a	25	KOR (DL): 27,072+	Strang3r
"The Last Holiday"	2018	—	—	—	—N/a	Non-album single
"Feedback" (너의 대답은)	2019	—	—	—	—N/a	Code#03 Set Me Free
"Set Me Free"	2019	—	—	—	—N/a	Code#03 Set Me Free
*The Billboard K-pop Hot 100 was discontinued July 16, 2014. "—" denotes releases that did not chart or were not released in that region.

== Other charted songs ==
Title	Year	Peak chart position		Sales	Album
Title	Year	KOR	US World	Sales	Album
"I'm Fine Thank You"	2014	3	6	KOR (DL): 481,766+	Code#02 Pretty Pretty
"My Flower"	2016	—	15	—N/a	Myst3ry
"Chaconne"	2016	—	17	—N/a	Myst3ry
"—" denotes releases that did not chart or were not released in that region.

== Soundtrack appearances ==
Title	Year	Peak chart positions		Album
Title	Year	KOR	KOR Hot 100	Album
"Make Me Go Crazy" (미치게 훅가게)	2014	59	43	Flower Grandpa Investigation Unit OST Part 1

== Compilation appearances ==
Title	Year	Album	Track No.
"Butterfly"	2017	Immortal Song 2: Singing the Legend (2017 Songs of Hope)	4
"All That Time" (그럴 땐)	2017	Sing For You – Fourth Story Take Care Of Your Family	1
"Miniskirt" (미니스커트)	2019	Immortal Song 2: Singing the Legend (Melodies of Love that Touch Your Heart)	2

== Music videos ==
List of music videos, showing year released and director
Title	Year	Director(s)
"Bad Girl"	2013	Song Won-Young
"I'm Not Crying"	2013	—N/a
"Hate You"	2013	Digipedi
"Pretty Pretty"	2013	Digipedi
"So Wonderful"	2014	Kim Zero
"Kiss Kiss"	2014	Digipedi
"I'm Fine Thank You"	2014	—N/a
"I'll Smile Even If It Hurts"	2015	—N/a
"Galaxy"	2016	Jo Beom-jin
"The Rain"	2016	Digipedi
"The Last Holiday"	2018	Kim Sujin
"Feedback"	2019	Zanybros
"Set Me Free"	2019	Zanybros
