= 2013 in South Korean music =

The following is a list of notable events and releases that happened in 2013 in music in South Korea.

== Debuting and disbanded in 2013 ==
=== Debuting groups ===
- 2Eyes
- 2Yoon
- 5urprise
- Acourve
- AlphaBat
- AOA Black
- Bestie
- Boys Republic
- BTS
- Danpyunsun and the Sailors
- GI
- History
- Infinite H
- Ladies' Code
- LC9
- MFBTY
- M.Pire
- Pungdeng-E
- QBS
- Royal Pirates
- Speed
- T-ara N4
- Xeno-T
- Wassup

=== Solo debuts ===
- Andrew Choi
- Bada Kim
- CL
- Eric Nam
- Hoody
- Hyolyn
- ICON
- Kang Seung-yoon
- Kim Jae-joong
- Lee Jin-ah
- Lim Kim
- Mayson the Soul
- NC.A
- Olltii
- Sunmi
- Z.Hera

=== Disbanded groups ===
- Coed School
- Deulgukhwa
- D-Unit
- DMTN
- N-Train
- The RockTigers
- Supreme Team

== Releases in 2013 ==
=== First quarter ===
==== January ====
Date	Title	Artist	Genre(s)
1	I Got a Boy	Girls' Generation	Dance, Electronic
4	Just JeA	JeA	Pop, Ballad
10	I Yah	Boyfriend	Dance
11	Fly High	Infinite H	Hip hop
13	Album 4 Part 2	Baechigi	Hip hop
14	Re:Blue	CNBLUE	Rock
15	Superior Speed	Speed	Pop, Dance
17	I	Jaejoong	Rock, Ballad
17	Harvest Moon	2Yoon	Dance-pop
17	Phantom Theory	Phantom	Hip hop
18	Begins	Moon Hee-joon	Dance-pop, Dubstep
23	Cloud 9	Eric Nam	Pop
23	Dolls	Nine Muses	Pop
24	Shut Up and Deal	The RockTigers	Rockabilly
25	Myname 2nd Single	Myname	Dance
28	The 5th Album Vol.1 – The True Story	4Men	Ballad
29	Eraser	Ali	Pop
31	Break Down	Super Junior-M	Dance
31	Gone Not Around Any Longer	Sistar19	Pop

==== February ====
Date	Title	Artist	Genre(s)
5	Little Giant	Huh Gak	Pop, Ballad
5	Blessed	Clazziquai Project	Pop, Electronic
11	Ring Ma Bell	Two X	Dance
12	One Shot	B.A.P	R&B, Hip hop
13	Rainbow Syndrome	Rainbow	Dance
13	Hello	NU'EST	Dance, Ballad
19	Dream Girl – The Misconceptions of You	Shinee	Dance, Electropop
20	Blow Speed	Speed	Dance, R&B
20	T-Love	Kim Tae-woo	Dance
25	No. 1	Teen Top	Hip hop, R&B, Dance
26	Y	Jaejoong	Rock, Ballad

==== March ====
Day	Title	Artist	Genre(s)
4	Affirmative Chapter 1	D-Unit	Dance, Hip hop
5	One Spring Day	2AM	Pop, Ballad
7	First Love Part 1	Lee Hi	Pop, R&B
7	Code 01 Bad Girl	Ladies' Code	Dance, Ballad
7	Collage	U-KISS	Dance, Ballad
8	Just Go (Goodbye's the New Hello)	RaNia	Dance
14	Expectation	Girl's Day	Dance, Electronic
14	Beautiful Kisses	G.NA	Dance, Ballad
14	Life	Heo Young-saeng	Dance, Ballad
18	Mystic Ballad Pt. 2	Davichi	Ballad
18	Second Evolution	EvoL	Dance
21	New Challenge	Infinite	Dance, Ballad
25	Voulez-vous	ZE:A Five	Dance
26	Come As You Are	Phantom	Ballad, Pop
27	Come Back	Double A	Dance
28	First Love	Lee Hi	Pop, R&B

=== Second quarter ===
==== April ====
Day	Title	Artist	Genre(s)
1	In Love	Electroboyz	Hip hop
4	The Third Album Part.2 'Love Blossom'	K.Will	Ballad, Dance
8	Romantic Spring	Gain and Hyung-woo	Pop
10	Money in the Building	M.I.B	Dance, Hip hop
18	Shaking Heart	C-Clown	Dance, R&B
22	Should Have Treated You Better	uBeat	Dance, Hip hop
24	Viva Primavera	DickPunks	Pop, Rock
25	Fall in L	Juniel	Pop, Ballad
25	No. 1 Repackage Special Edition	Teen Top	Dance
26	Why So Serious? – The Misconceptions of Me	Shinee	R&B, Dance
26	Name is 4Minute	4Minute	Dance-pop, Hip hop
26	Entrain	N-Train	Dance
29	Countryside Life	T-ara N4	Dance-pop, Hip hop
30	Letter from Secret	Secret	Dance

==== May ====
Day	Title	Artist	Genre(s)
2	Do You Want Some Tea	Hello Venus	Dance
6	What's Happening?	B1A4	Dance
6	Grown	2PM	Electronic, R&B
8	The 5th Album Vol.2 – Thank You	4Men	Ballad
9	Wild	Nine Muses	Dance
9	Skirmish	LC9	Dance, R&B
14	Forever Young	Seo In-young	Ballad
16	The Classic	Shinhwa	Dance, R&B
20	Hyde	VIXX	Dance
21	Monochrome	Lee Hyori	Dance
22	My Everything	Lee Min-ho	Dance
23	Real 100%	100%	Dance
27	Love Was Enough	Andrew Choi	K-pop, R&B
31	Luv Virus	Skarf	Dance

==== June ====
Day	Title	Artist	Genre(s)
3	XOXO	Exo	R&B, Pop
4	Sexy Beat	MBLAQ	Dance
4	Rainbow Syndrome Part.2	Rainbow	Dance
7	Trap	Henry	Dance
7	Flaming Nuts	Crying Nut	Post-punk, indie rock
10	Escaping Gravity	Nell	Rock, Indie rock
11	Give It to Me	Sistar	Dance
12	2 Cool 4 Skool	BTS	Hip hop, R&B
12	Life Is Beautiful	Monni	Rock
13	First Love	After School	Pop, R&B
14	Black Tinkerbell	Chocolat	Dance
17	Bad Boys	Led Apple	Pop-Rock
17	A Good Girl	Baek A-yeon	Pop
19	Young Folk	Sunny Hill	Dance
20	Be Ambitious	Dal Shabet	Dance, Electropop
21	Don't Mess With Me	2Eyes	Dance
24	Female President	Girl's Day	Dance, Electropop
25	Mambo	A-Prince	Dance
25	Love Love Love	Roy Kim	Acoustic pop

=== Third quarter ===
==== July ====
Day	Title	Artist	Genre(s)
4	Memories of Summer	Davichi	Ballad
4	Myname 1st Mini Album	Myname	Dance
5	Secret Garden	Apink	Dance, Electropop
8	Waiting For U	Mr. Mr	Dance
10	Don't Let It Get You Down	SHU-I	Dance
10	I Like 2 Party	Jay Park	Hip hop
10	Insane	A-Jax	Dance
11	A's Doll House	Ailee	Dance, R&B
15	Incredible	Xia Junsu	Pop, R&B
16	Destiny	Infinite	Dance, Electronic
19	Hard to Love, How to Love	Beast	Dance, Hip hop
22	Round 3	Kim Hyun-joong	Dance
25	Five Beats of Hearts	Tahiti	Dance
29	Black Box	Brown Eyed Girls	Pop, R&B
29	Pink Tape	f(x)	Dance, Electropop
30	Since 1971	F-ve Dolls	Dance
31	Jekyll	VIXX	Dance

==== August ====
Day	Title	Artist	Genre(s)
1	U R So Cute	24K	Dance
2	Burn It Up	E.S.Q	Dance
5	Growl	Exo	Electropop, R&B
6	Badman	B.A.P	Hip hop, R&B
8	Bound – The Misconceptions of Us	Shinee	Dance, R&B
8	Hang Out	Big Star	Dance
8	Spectacular	Tasty	Dance
9	Illusion	ZE:A	Dance
12	Love Beat	MBLAQ	Dance
13	Always Love You	Kim Hyung-jun	Ballad
19	Let's Talk About Love	Seungri	R&B, Pop
19	OK About It	AA	Dance
20	Just Now	History	Dance
22	Sleep Talking	NU'EST	Dance
23	L’Homme Libre Vol.1	Defconn	Hip hop
26	Shout Out	Royal Pirates	Pop-rock
26	Teen Top Class	Teen Top	Dance
26	Stardust	Lunafly	Pop
28	I Like This Song	Lyn	Pop, Ballad

==== September ====
Day	Title	Artist	Genre(s)
2	Full Bloom	Kara	Dance
2	Coup d'Etat	G-Dragon	Hip hop
3	Tremendous	Global Icon	Dance
5	Pretty Pretty	Ladies' Code	Dance, R&B
5	Ordinary Girl	Piggy Dolls	Dance
9	Thriller	BtoB	Dance
9	Halftime	J.Y. Park	Dance
9	Her Voice	Lim Kim	Jazz, Pop
10	Stupid in Love	Soyou X Mad Clown	Hip hop
11	O!RUL8,2?	BTS	Hip hop
12	The Cure	Drunken Tiger	Hip hop
16	In Stardom V3.0	Cho PD	Hip hop
17	First Love	F-ve Dolls	Dance
23	Thanks To	F.T. Island	Rock
25	Busker Busker Vol. 2	Busker Busker	Pop, Acoustic
26	The Streets Go Disco	Crayon Pop	Dance
30	Hope Torture	Song Ji-eun	Pop, Ballad

=== Fourth quarter ===
==== October ====
Day	Title	Artist	Genre(s)
2	Very Good	Block B	Hip hop, Dance
2	2nd Part.2	Vanilla Acoustic	Ballad, Indie pop
4	Shine	Standing Egg	Ballad, Pop
8	Modern Times	IU	Ballad, Retro
8	Identity	Boys Republic	Dance
8	Shooting Star	2Eyes	Dance
10	The Sense of an Ending	Jung Joon-young	Pop-rock
10	Who Are You?	Kahi	Pop, R&B
10	Again	T-ARA	Dance
10	Wedding Day	Pure	Dance
11	Myname 3rd Single Album	My Name	Dance
14	Prima Donna	Nine Muses	Dance, Synthpop
14	Everybody	Shinee	Electropop, R&B
16	Red Motion	AOA	Dance
17	Will in Fall	K.Will	Ballad, R&B
22	Welcome to My Zone	Samuel Seo	Hip hop
23	School Bell	Delight	Dance
23	Teen Top Class Addition	Teen Top	Dance
24	Dogg's Out	Topp Dogg	Hip hop
25	Into the Light	N:Sonic	Dance
28	Chemistry	Trouble Maker	Dance
29	WWW	Jaejoong	Rock, Ballad
31	Moments	U-Kiss	Dance

==== November ====
Day	Title	Artist	Genre(s)
1	Curious	Fiestar	Dance
6	Hush	Miss A	Dance, R&B
8	Ringa Linga	Taeyang	EDM, Hip hop
11	Reminisce	Huh Gak	R&B, Pop
11	Trip	Untouchable	Hip hop
15	Doom Dada	T.O.P	Alternative hip hop
18	The Mood	F.T. Island	Rock, Ballad
18	The Meaning of Solitude	Lee Juck	K-pop
20	Nom Nom Nom	Wassup	Hip hop, Dance
20	Voice	100% V	Ballad
22	The Truth	Electroboyz	Hip hop
25	Voodoo	VIXX	Dance
26	Love & Hate	Hyolyn	Ballad, Pop
27	Nocturne	2AM	Ballad, Pop
27	Hello Goodbye	DickPunks	Ballad
28	Blue Spring	History	Dance
28	Chapter II	The Boss	Dance

==== December ====
Day	Title	Artist	Genre(s)
4	Again 1977	T-ara	Dance
6	Deulgukhwa	Deulgukhwa	Rock
9	Gift from Secret	Secret	Dance
9	Miracles in December	Exo	Ballad
13	Flower	Junhyung	Dance, Rap
13	Dogg's Out Repackage	Topp Dogg	Dance
18	Musical December 2013 with Kim Junsu	Xia Junsu	Ballad, Pop
20	Modern Times – Epilogue	IU	Ballad, Retro

== Deaths ==
- Kim Ji-hoon, singer-songwriter & actor; former member of Two Two (1994–1996,) and Duke (2002–2007)
- Rottyful Sky, singer, producer, and actress (Roo'ra (2006–2007); MADmoiselle (2009))

== Charts ==
- List of number-one hits of 2013 (South Korea)
- List of number-one albums of 2013 (South Korea)
- List of Korea K-Pop Hot 100 number-one singles

== See also ==
- 2013 in South Korea
- List of South Korean films of 2013
