= Lee So-jung =

South Korean singer (born 1993)

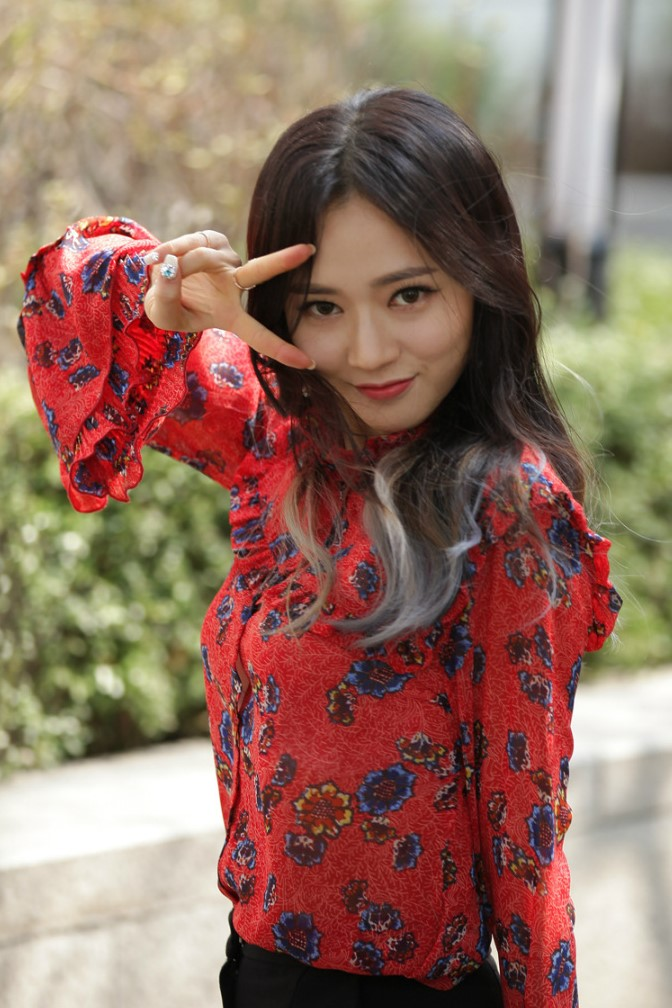
- Lee in March 2016
- Born: September 3, 1993 (age 33); Wonju, Gangwon Province, South Korea
- Education: Dankook University
- Occupation: Singer
- Musical career
- Genres: K-pop; R&B; dance
- Instrument: Vocals
- Years active: 2012–present
- Labels: Polaris; JTBC Studios
- Member of: Ladies' Code

Korean name
- Hangul: 이소정
- Hanja: 李昭政
- RR: I Sojeong
- MR: I Sojŏng

Lee So-jung (Korean: 이소정; born September 3, 1993), known mononymously as Sojung, is a South Korean singer. She is best known as a member of the South Korean girl group Ladies' Code. Sojung made her debut as a soloist in March 2017 with single "Better Than Me".

== Early life ==
Lee was born on September 3, 1993, in Wonju, Gangwon Province, South Korea. She attended Dankook University, where she majored in modern music.

== Career ==
=== 2012–2014: Debut and car crash ===
In 2012, Lee auditioned for the Mnet talent show The Voice of Korea, which first aired on February 10 of the same year. For the show, she released several songs including a cover version of the Wonder Girls song "2 Different Tears", "Memory Loss" (기억 상실), and "No More".

In February 2013, it was announced that Lee would be a member of Ladies' Code, under Polaris Entertainment. The group's debut mini-album Code 01 Bad Girl along with the title song "Bad Girl" and accompanying music video was released on March 7, 2013. In the same year, she collaborated with rapper San E on the song "Twisted" (불편한 관계), released in November.

On Sojung's 21st birthday, September 3, 2014, she and the rest of the group were involved in a car accident. Ladies' Code was returning to Seoul from their performance at Open Concert. Lee's groupmate EunB was pronounced dead minutes later. Lee and Rise, another groupmate, suffered serious injuries and were taken to the Catholic University of Korea St. Vincent's Hospital in Suwon. Lee's situation was stabilized, but Rise's condition deteriorated and she was transferred to Ajou University Hospital, where she died four days later on September 7, 2014. Lee was transferred to a hospital in her hometown. The remaining three members returned to the group's dormitory on November 12 with Lee still receiving outpatient treatment.

=== 2015–present: Debut as a soloist ===
After Ladies' Code's return after the accident, Lee was featured in two episodes of the MBC show King of Mask Singer on February 21. For the show, she released the songs "Blue In You" (그대 안의 블루), a collaboration with Lee Tae-sung, and "If You Come Back" (그대 돌아 오면), garnering a total of 59 votes. In June, she released the song "I Don't Want" (바라지 않아), a duet with Jung Key. In 2016, Lee was a contestant on the JTBC competition show Girl Spirit, which first aired on July 19.

Lee made her official debut as a soloist in May 2017 with the ballad track "Better Than Me". The music video was released on May 4, starring Loona's Hyunjin. The following month, she collaborated with Mind U for the release of the single "A Break Up Song", included on the studio album, RE: Mine. She then released "Deep Inside" (딥 인사이드), a collaboration with Hanhae, in January 2018. On March 14, 2018, Lee returned with the release of her first single album, Stay Here, consisting of a title track of the same name and b-side track "Crystal Clear".

In February 2020, Lee and Ladies' Code bandmates Zuny and Ashley left Polaris Entertainment after contract expiration and unsuccessful renegotiations with the company. Lee's subsequent work included the release of her second single album Island and its lead single of the same name on August 22, 2020. The song is heavily influenced by the tropical house genre, an atypical venture for Lee. The following year, she participated in JTBC's second-chance vocal competition show, Sing Again, finishing among the program's top six contestants. On February 19, 2021, under new label Needs Music Entertainment (니즈뮤직엔터테인먼트), Lee released her third single album, 함께 했는데 이별은 나 혼자인 거야, consisting of a title ballad of the same name and its instrumental version. The track became the first of Lee's singles to enter Korea's weekly Gaon Digital Chart, peaking at number 92. The following weeks the song achieved new highs peaking at number 65, number 42 and number 33. Additionally, the song peaked at number 30 on the Gaon Download Chart.

In April 2021, Lee signed a contract with JTBC Studios.

== Personal life ==
=== Health ===
Throughout her career, Lee has suffered problems with anorexia. During an interview in 2016, she mentioned that she resorted to a strict diet, resulting in the loss of 11 kilograms (24 lb; 1 st 10 lb).

== Discography ==
=== Single album ===
Title	Details	Peak chart positions	Sales
Title	Details	KOR	Sales
Stay Here	Released: March 14, 2018; Label: Polaris Entertainment; Formats: CD, digital download	—	—N/a
"—" denotes releases that did not chart or were not released in that region.

=== Singles ===
Title	Year	Peak chart positions	Sales (DL)	Album
Title	Year	KOR	Sales (DL)	Album
As lead artist
"Better Than Me" (우린 왜 이별 하는 걸까?)	2017	—		Non-album single
"Stay Here" (여기있어)	2018	—		Stay Here
"Island"	2020	—		Island
"If You Were Still Here" (함께 했는데 이별은 나 혼자인 거야)	2021	33		Non-album single
"Love in the Cloud (#구름스타그램)"	2022	—		Non-album single
"Hello" (오랜만이야 안녕)	2023	—		Non-album single
"Far Away"	2023	—		Non-album single
As featured artist
"Twisted" (불편한 관계) (P-Type feat. San E and So-jung)	2013	100	KOR: 18,208	Twisted
"I Don't Want" (바라지 않아) (Jung Key feat. So-jung)	2016	26	KOR: 150,625	Non-album single
"A Break Up Song That's Like a Love Song" (사랑노래 같은 이별노래) (Mind U feat. So-jung)	2017	—		Re:Mind
"Deep Inside (딥 인사이드) (Heejun Han feat. So-jung)	2017	—		Non-album single
"HEAVEN (헤븐) (Paper Planet feat. So-jung)	2019	—		Non-album single
Collaborations
"I'm Fine Thank You" (with Kim Bum Soo, IVY, Rumble Fish, Sun Woo, Heejun Han)	2015	—		Non-album single
"Get Over" (with MKPBand)	2020	—		Sojung X MKPBand
"Netflix" (with MKPBand)	2020	—		Sojung X MKPBand
"—" denotes releases that did not chart or were not released in that region.

=== Soundtrack appearances ===
Title	Year	Album
"Searching Me" (서칭 미)	2019	Possessed OST
"Perfume" (향기)	2019	Angel's Last Mission: Love OST
"Yesterday" (예스터데이)	2019	Love Affairs in the Afternoon OST
"As If Scattered in the Cold Wind" (찬바람결에 흩어져 가듯이)	2019	Queen: Love and War OST
"Walkin' on air" (워킨 온 에어)	2020	The Present Has Arrived OST
"It's Alright" (괜찮아)	2021	Mouse OST
"Skyline" (스카이라인)	2021	Scripting Your Destiny OST
"Just for One Day" (단 하루만)	2021	Bossam: Steal the Fate OST
"Love Me Again" (거짓말이라 말해)	2021	Moonshine OST
"The One Who Wins" (이기는 연애)	2023	Bo-ra! Deborah OST

=== Other appearances ===
Title	Year	Album
"2 Different Tears"	2012	The Voice of Korea Part. 02
"In The Rain" (빗속에서)	2012	The Voice of Korea Part. 04
"Memory Loss" (기억상실)	2012	The Voice of Korea Part. 05
"No More"	2012	The Voice of Korea The Behind
"Blue In You" (그대안의 블루)	2016	King of Mask Singer Episode 47
"If You Come Back" (그대 돌아오면)	2016	King of Mask Singer Episode 48
"Don't Be Shy" (아끼지마)	2016	Idol Vocal League – Girl Spirit EPISODE 02
"I Don't Love You" (널 사랑하지 않아)	2016	Idol Vocal League – Girl Spirit EPISODE 05
"24 Hours + NoNoNo (24시간이 모자라 + NoNoNo)" (with Seunghee)	2016	Idol Vocal League – Girl Spirit EPISODE 06
"One's Way Back" (귀로)	2016	Idol Vocal League – Girl Spirit EPISODE 05
"The Flight" (비상)	2020	Sing Again Episode 3
"As We Live" (살다 보면)	2021	Sing Again Episode 10
"The While Magnolia" (하얀 목련)	2021	Famous Singers Part 1
"An Unfinished Song" (못다한 노래) (with Yang Hee-eun, Lee Seung-yoon, Jeong Hong-il, Lee Mu-jin)	2021	Famous Singers Part 1
"To Me" (투 미)	2021	Famous Singers Part 2

== Filmography ==
=== Television shows ===
Year	Title	Notes
2012	The Voice of Korea	Contestant; eighth place
2016	King of Mask Singer	Contestant
2016	Girl Spirit	Fifth place
2020	Sing Again	Fourth place
2022	Singforest	Cast

== Theater ==
Year	English title	Korean title	Role	Ref.
2010	The First Queen	뮤지컬 선덕여왕	Queen Seondeok	
2022–2023	Dracula	드라큘라	Lorraine	

== Awards and nominations ==
Name of the award ceremony, year presented, category, nominee of the award, and the result of the nomination
Award ceremony	Year	Category	Nominee / Work	Result	Ref.
K-Model Awards with AMF GLOBAL	2021	Popular Culture Rising Star	Lee So-jung	Won	
