= 2016 in South Korean music =

The following is a list of notable events and releases that happened in 2016 in music in South Korea.

== Debuting and disbanded in 2016 ==
=== Debuting groups ===
- AOA Cream
- Astro
- Blackpink
- Bolbbalgan4
- Boys24
- BtoB Blue
- CocoSori
- Double S 301
- Exo-CBX
- Gugudan
- I.B.I
- Imfact
- INX
- I.O.I
- KNK
- MOBB
- Momoland
- NCT Dream
- NCT 127
- Nine Muses A
- Off On Off
- Pentagon
- Sevenus
- SF9
- The East Light
- Unnies
- Victon
- Voisper
- Vromance
- WJSN
- XXX

=== Solo debuts ===
- Bobby
- Dean
- Elo
- Eunji
- Fei
- Gemma
- Gun
- Hash Swan
- Hyoyeon
- Jang Dong-woo
- Jessica Jung
- Jenyer
- Jimin
- Jungah
- Jung Seung-hwan
- Justhis
- Jvcki Wai
- Kim Se-jeong
- Kwak Jin-eon
- Kwon Jin-ah
- Lee Hyun-woo
- Luna
- Mino
- Mint
- PH-1
- Punchnello
- Ryeowook
- Sam Kim
- Sandeul
- Subin
- Thunder
- Tiffany
- Yesung
- Yezi
- Yoochun
- Woohyun
- Agust D

=== Disbanded groups ===
- 2NE1
- 2Yoon
- 4Minute
- 4L
- Eastern Sidekick
- GI
- HeartB
- Kara
- Led Apple
- LPG
- Lucky J
- MyB
- N-Sonic
- Orange Caramel
- Rainbow
- Rainbow Blaxx
- Rainbow Pixie
- Speed
- Sunny Days

== Releases in 2016 ==
=== First quarter ===
==== January ====
Date	Album	Artist(s)	Genre(s)
5	Naturalness	Dal Shabet	Dance
12	Delight	Shin Hye-sung	Pop
13	First Step	Acourve	Folk
14	Re:union, The real	V.O.S	Ballad
15	P.O.E.M	Owen Ovadoz	Hip hop
18	Red Point	Teen Top	Dance
18	Sting	Stellar	Pop, Pop rock
18	How Much Love Is In Your Wallet	Park Yoo-chun	Ballad
21	GAME	Cross Gene	Dance
21	Sound Up!	The Legend	Dance, Ballad
25	Snowflake	GFriend	Synthpop, Dance
27	Lollipop	Imfact	Dance, Ballad
27	U-Turn	Bumkey	R&B
28	Foresight Dream	Yezi	Hip hop
28	The Little Prince	Ryeowook	Ballad, Dance
28	Pathos	MC the Max	Ballad, Rock
29	3.3	Royal Pirates	Rock
29	Outrage Op.6	Lee Joo-min	Dance

==== February ====
Date	Album	Artist(s)	Genre(s)
01	Exit : E	Winner	Pop, R&B
01	Act. 7	4Minute	Electronic, Hip-hop
2	Pit a Pat	Yoo Seung-woo	Pop
12	No.X	Kim Jae-joong	Pop rock
15	Crosswalk	Jo Kwon	Ballad
15	Prism	Rainbow	R&B, Ballad, Pop
16	ETERNAL5	Double S 301	Pop
17	Q is	NU'EST	Dance
18	Once in a Lifetime (Repackage)	Johan Kim	K-pop
22	Carnival	B.A.P	Hip-hop
23	Press It	Taemin	Dance
23	Spring Up	Astro	Dance
23	JACK OF ALL TRADES	4Ten	Pop
24	Myst3ry	Ladies' Code	R&B
25	Would You Like?	Cosmic Girls	Dance
26	Melting	Mamamoo	R&B, Jazz
29	Refresh	CLC	Dance

==== March ====
Date	Album	Artist(s)	Genre(s)
2	Thumbs Up	Hong Jin Young	Trot
3	KNOCK	KNK	Dance, Ballad
4	Live With Me	V.O.S	Ballad
8	Platonic Love	Snuper	Synthpop
9	A Delicate Sense	Fiestar	Dance
9	Seoulite	Lee Hi	Pop, R&B
12	[R.EBIRTH]	Ravi	Hip hop
17	Sketch	Hyomin	Pop
17	The Velvet	Red Velvet	R&B, Ballad
19	35 Girls 5 Concepts	Produce 101	Electronica
21	Flight Log: Departure	Got7	Hip hop, trap
22	Hello	Lip Service	EDM
24	Interview	Eric Nam	Ballad
24	Addicting	A.cian	Pop
24	130 mood: TRBL	Dean	R&B
28	Pink Ocean	Oh My Girl	Dance, Pop
28	Remember That	BTOB	R&B, Ballad
28	Colored	Jun Hyoseong	Dance
30	Daydream	Day6	Pop rock
30	BR:evolution	Boys Republic	Dance
30	Myst3Re:	Ladies' Code	R&B

=== Second quarter ===
==== April ====
Date	Album	Artist(s)	Genre(s)
4	Blueming	CNBLUE	Pop rock
6	Fresh Adventure	Laboum	Dance
10	I Am Sam	Sam Kim	Jazz
11	HIM	History	Dance
11	Blooming Period	Block B	R&B, Hip-hop
15	Bad Girl	JeA	Ballad
18	Spotlight	UP10TION	Dance
18	Dream	Eunji	Ballad
19	Zelos	VIXX	Dance, Ballad
19	Here I Am	Yesung	Ballad
20	Seoulite	Lee Hi	Pop, R&B
20	Very Berry (EP)	Berry Good	Dance, Ballad
21	Dynamic Love	Park Boram	Pop
21	Repeat	Vibe	Ballad
21	Half Album RED ICKLE	Bolbbalgan4	Folk-pop, Indie pop
25	Love & Letter	Seventeen	Dance, Pop
25	Page Two	Twice	Dance
25	A New Trilogy	Lovelyz	Dance
27	Spring	April	Bubblegum, Dance
27	And Spring	Goo Hye Sun	Ballad
27	Brainless	No Brain	Rock
27	K	Kim Dong-wan	Ballad
27	Q Train 2	The Quiett	Hip-hop

==== May ====
Date	Album	Artist(s)	Genre(s)
2	The Most Beautiful Moment In Life: Young Forever	BTS	Hip hop, Electronic
4	Chrysalis	I.O.I	Dance, Pop
4	Spring	Akdong Musician	Folk, Ballad
6	Interlude	Crush	R&B
9	Write..	Woohyun	Ballad, Pop rock
9	Brotherhood	VAV	Dance
11	I Just Wanna Dance	Tiffany	R&B, Synthpop
16	Good Luck	AOA	Dance, Electropop
17	With Love, J	Jessica Jung	Ballad, Pop
17	Aphrodite	B.I.G	Dance
18	The Clan Pt. 1 Lost	Monsta X	Dance, Hip-hop
24	She Is	Jonghyun	Dance, R&B
24	So So	Baek A-yeon	Ballad
26	Windy Day	Oh My Girl	Pop
27	Ego Expand (100%)	Samuel Seo	Hip-hop
30	Xignature	XIA	Dance, Electronic
30	Nu.Clear	CLC	Dance, R&B
31	Free Somebody	Luna	Dance, Electronica

==== June ====
Date	Album	Artist(s)	Genre(s)
1	Street	EXID	Electronic, R&B
2	Awake	KNK	Dance
7	Stalker	U-KISS	Pop
9	Ex'Act	Exo	R&B, Pop
9	Will	Jeong Jinwoon	Rock
13	Flower	Bada	Dance
14	Happy Ending	DIA	Dance
14	With	Daybreak	Rock
15	Seenroot's Wonderland	Seenroot	Folk
17	Regression	Baechigi	Hip hop
20	Outlast	As One	Ballad
21	Insane Love	Sistar	Pop, R&B
21	Emotion	Madtown	Dance
23	Musik	Kisum	Dance
23	Miro	Romeo	Dance
27	High Heels	Brave Girls	Pop
28	Why	Taeyeon	Pop, R&B
28	Act. 1 The Little Mermaid	Gugudan	Dance
29	I Like U Too Much	Sonamoo	Dance

=== Third quarter ===
==== July ====
Date	Album	Artist(s)	Genre(s)
1	Summer Vibes	Astro	Dance, Synthpop
1	Color	Melody Day	Dance
1	No Doubt	VAV	Dance
4	Highlight	Beast	Ballad, Pop
4	Love & Letter Repackage	Seventeen	Dance, Pop
5	Why So Lonely	Wonder Girls	Reggae
10	NCT#127	NCT 127	Hip hop, Electronic
11	LOL	GFriend	Pop rock, Synthpop
12	Compass	Snuper	Synthpop
12	The Action	Vromance	R&B
12	Goody Bag	Kim Heechul & Kim Jungmo	Trot
13	Scene Stealers	Jay Park, Ugly Duck	Hip hop
18	Where's The Truth?	F.T. Island	Rock
18	Cry	Stellar	Dance
19	Come To Me	Beatwin	Dance
19	What's Your Number?	Zhou Mi	Dance, Ballad
20	Shubirubirub	Gavy NJ	Dance
28	Unicorn Plus the Brand New Label	Unicorn	Dance
30	12	Beenzino	Hip hop

==== August ====
Date	Album	Artist(s)	Genre(s)
1	Listen to My Word	Oh My Girl	Pop
1	A'wesome	Hyuna	Hip hop, Trap
2	Nice	Basick	Hip-hop
4	Muses Diary	Nine Muses A	Dance
5	Summer Go	UP10TION	Dance
7	The Clan Pt. 1 Lost	Monsta X	Hip-hop, electronic
8	Put 'Em Up	B.A.P	EDM
8	″Square One″	Blackpink	EDM
9	Mr. No Love	Jun. K (2PM)	R&B
12	Hades	VIXX	Dance, Ballad
15	Agust D	Agust D	Hip-hop
17	The Secret	Cosmic Girls	Synthpop
18	Lotto	Exo	R&B, Electronic
19	Strange	Masc	Dance
19	C	Nell	Rock
20	Symbol	Tymee	Hip-hop
23	Love Sign	Laboum	Dance
23	19에서 20	Park Ji-min (15&)	R&B, Pop
23	Reboot	Two X	Dance
24	Chewing Gum (泡泡糖)	NCT Dream	Dance, Pop
29	Canvas	NU'EST	Dance
29	Full Album RED PLANET	Bolbbalgan4	Folk pop

==== September ====
Date	Album	Artist(s)	Genre(s)
2	Happy Day	HALO	Dance
6	I`M	Lim Chang Jung	Ballad
7	Russian Roulette	Red Velvet	Pop, House
9	The Mobb	MOBB (Mino X Bobby)	Hip-hop
9	End Again	Gain	Dance
13	Gentlemen's Game	2PM	R&B, Electronic
13	Spell	DIA	Dance, Ballad
19	Infinite Only	Infinite	Dance, R&B
20	Bobby Doll	Song Jieun	Pop
26	Pink Revolution	Apink	Dance, R&B
26	Doo Doom Chit	Crayon Pop	Retro
27	Flight Log: Turbulence	Got7	Hip-hop, Electronic
29	FRI. SAT. SUN	Dal Shabet	Dance, Pop

=== Fourth quarter ===
==== October ====
Date	Album	Artist(s)	Genre(s)
4	The Clan Pt. 2 Guilty	Monsta X	Hip-hop, electronic
4	Stay As You Are	Sandeul	Ballad
5	Feeling Sensation	SF9	Dance
5	1 of 1	Shinee	R&B, Dance
5	A New Empire	Ailee	R&B, Dance
5	Heejin	Heejin (Loona)	Pop
10	Wings	BTS	Hip-hop, Electronic
10	Pentagon	Pentagon	Dance
13	50 X Half	Davichi	Ballad
13	Strang3r	Ladies' Code	R&B
13	Time Leap	100%	Dance
14	Wonderlust	Crush	R&B
14	I Am Seven	Seven	R&B, Pop
17	Miss Me?	I.O.I	Dance, Electronic
20	Everything You Wanted	Jay Park	R&B, Hip-hop
22	The Real One	24K	Dance
24	Twicecoaster: Lane 1	Twice	Dance
26	Tried So Hard	Monni	Rock
28	Time To Be a Woman	NC.A	Ballad
31	Kratos	VIXX	Dance
31	Welcome 2 Bastarz	Bastarz	Hip-hop
31	Hey Mama!	Exo-CBX	R&B, Electronic

==== November ====
Date	Album	Artist(s)	Genre(s)
1	Square Two	Blackpink	tropical house
1	GLORY	Berry Good	Dance
2	U.F.O	MC Mong	Hip-hop
3	'Home' Chapter 1	Kangta	Ballad
7	Noir	B.A.P	Hip-hop, R&B
7	Memory	Mamamoo	Retro, R&B
7	New Men	BtoB	Dance, Ballad
7	First Street	Topp Dogg	Dance, Hip-hop
8	It's Me	Hyolyn	R&B, Dance
9	Remember	T-ara	Dance, Electropop
9	Voice to New World	Victon	Dance
10	Welcome to Momoland	Momoland	Dance
10	Autumn Story	Astro	Dance
10	Waiting, Still	Kyuhyun	Ballad
11	Revolt	Imfact	Dance
15	1 and 1	Shinee	R&B, Dance
15	Rain Of Mind	Snuper	Synthpop
17	Remain	KNK	Dance
17	HyunJin	Hyunjin (Loona)	Pop, R&B
18	Voice + Whisper	Voisper	Ballad, R&B
19	Our Days	SG Wannabe	Ballad,
19	50	Kim Gun-mo	Ballad
21	VIXX 2016 Conception Ker	VIXX	Dance, Hip-hop
21	Burst	UP10TION	Dance
23	You o'clock	JeA	Ballad
28	Good Timing	B1A4	Dance
29	Unchanging Part 1 Orange	Shinhwa	Ballad

==== December ====
Date	Album	Artist(s)	Genre(s)
1	2016 Re-ALBUM	Sechs Kies	K-pop, Ballad
5	Going Seventeen	Seventeen	Dance, Electronic
7	Five Senses	Pentagon	Dance
7	THUNDER	Thunder	Dance
9	Eternal 0 & Eternal 1	Double S 301	Dance
10	Wonderland	Jessica Jung	Electropop
13	Made	Big Bang	Dance, Hip-hop
15	Dear	Apink	Ballad, Pop
15	HaSeul	Haseul (Loona)	Ballad, Pop
16	On And On	Hoody	R&B
19	For Life	Exo	Ballad
27	The Cloud Dream of the Nine	Uhm Jung-hwa	Dance
30	Start a Fire	BP Rania	Dance

== See also ==
- 2016 in South Korea
- List of South Korean films of 2016
