= I'll Smile, Even If It Hurts =

"I'll Smile, Even if it Hurts"

Single by Ladies' Code
- Released: September 7, 2015 (South Korea)
- Recorded: 2015
- Genre: K-pop; ballad
- Length: 7:36
- Label: Polaris; LOEN
- Songwriter: Lee Sojung

Ladies' Code singles chronology
"Kiss Kiss" (2014)	"I'll Smile, Even if it Hurts" (2015)	"Myst3ry" (2016)

"I'll Smile, Even if it Hurts" is a song recorded by South Korean girl group Ladies' Code. It is the group's first release following the deaths of members EunB and RiSe in September 2014.

== History ==
On September 1, 2014, Ladies' Code announced that they were preparing for a comeback. Two days later, however, the group was involved in a traffic collision that killed members EunB and RiSe. Almost a year later, Ladies' Code held a memorial concert in RiSe's home town of Tokyo, where they performed "I'll Smile, Even if it Hurts," for the first time. On the anniversary of RiSe's death, the song was released as a digital single.

== Reception ==
During the week of its release, the song charted #18 on the Gaon Music Chart.

== Track listing ==
- The song was written by group member Sojung.

No.	Title	Length
1.	"I'll Smile, Even if it Hurts" (아파도 웃을래)	3:49
2.	"I'll Smile, Even if it Hurts (Instrumental)" (아파도 웃을래 (Inst.))	3:47
Total length:		7:36
