= Set You Free =

Set You Free or Set U Free may refer to:

== Albums ==
- Set You Free (Chisel album), by Chisel, 1997
- Set You Free (Gary Allan album), 2013
- Set You Free, by Nomos, 1997
- Set You Free, by Tammy Trent, 2000
- Set You Free: Gene Clark in the Byrds 1964–1973, by Gene Clark, 2004

== Songs ==
- "Set You Free" (N-Trance song), by N-Trance, 1995
- "Set You Free" (The Black Keys song), by The Black Keys, 2003
- "Set U Free" (Keshia Chanté song), by Keshia Chanté, 2011
- "Set U Free" (Planet Soul song), by Planet Soul, 1995
- "Set You Free", by Ol' Skool, 1997
- "Set You Free", by Ted Leo, 1999
- "Set You Free", by Poison, 2000
- "Set You Free", by 3OH!3, 2011
- "Set You Free", by Wale, 2019

== See also ==
- "I'll Set You Free", a 1988 song by The Bangles
- Love Will Set You Free (disambiguation)
- "Set You Free This Time", a 1966 song by The Byrds
- Set Me Free (disambiguation)
