= Set Me Free =

Set Me Free may refer to:

== Film ==
- Set Me Free (1924 film), a German silent film
- Set Me Free, a 1989 Hong Kong film featuring Cecilia Yip
- Set Me Free (1999 film) (Emporte-moi), a French-Canadian film directed by Léa Pool
- Set Me Free (2014 film) (Geoin), a South Korean film

== Literature ==
- Set Me Free, a novel by Miranda Beverly-Whittemore, winner of the 2007 Janet Heidinger Kafka Prize

== Music ==
=== Albums ===
- Set Me Free (Jennifer Knapp album) or the title song, 2014
- Set Me Free (Jermaine Stewart album) or the title song (see below), 1992
- Set Me Free (Marion Raven album) or the title song, 2007
- Set Me Free or the title song, by A. R. Rahman, 1991
- Set Me Free, by Mal Waldron, 1969
- Code#03 Set Me Free or the title song, by Ladies' Code, 2019

=== Songs ===
- "Set Me Free" (Dillon Francis and Martin Garrix song), 2014
- "Set Me Free" (Eden Alene song), 2021
- "Set Me Free" (Jermaine Stewart song), 1992
- "Set Me Free" (The Kinks song), 1965
- "Set Me Free" (Mary J. Blige song), 2017
- "Set Me Free" (Velvet Revolver song), 2003
- Set Me Free (Twice song), 2023
- "Set Me Free Pt. 2", by Jimin, 2023
- "Privilege (Set Me Free)", by the Patti Smith Group, 1978
- "Set Me Free", by Alexandra Stan from Unlocked
- "Set Me Free", by Armin van Buuren, 2025
- "Set Me Free", by Avenged Sevenfold from Live in the LBC & Diamonds in the Rough
- "Set Me Free", by Billy Kenny
- "Set Me Free", by Bleeding Through from Love Will Kill All
- "Set Me Free", by Casting Crowns from Lifesong
- "Set Me Free", by Charli XCX from True Romance
- "Set Me Free", by the Chicks from Gaslighter
- "Set Me Free", by Chris Rea from Auberge
- "Set Me Free", by Heathen from Breaking the Silence
- "Set Me Free", by the Heavy from Great Vengeance and Furious Fire
- "Set Me Free", by Jackson Hawke
- "Set Me Free", by Jaki Graham
- "Set Me Free", by John Cale from Walking on Locusts
- "Set Me Free", by Leea Nanos, competing to represent Australia in the Eurovision Song Contest 2019
- "Set Me Free", by Marshmello from Joytime III
- "Set Me Free", by Pennywise from Land of the Free?
- "Set Me Free", by the Pointer Sisters from Hot Together
- "Set Me Free", by Pushim, produced by DJ Premier
- "Set Me Free", by Raven-Symoné from This Is My Time
- "Set Me Free", by Robyn & La Bagatelle Magique from Love Is Free
- "Set Me Free", by the Sand Band from All Through the Night
- "Set Me Free", by Sweet from Sweet Fanny Adams
- "Set Me Free", by Utopia from Adventures in Utopia
- "Set Me Free / I've Got the Key", by Spacemen 3 from Recurring
- "Set Me Free (Empty Rooms)", by Jam & Spoon

== See also ==
- Set You Free (disambiguation)
- "Set Him Free", a 1959 song by Skeeter Davis
