= Hate You (Ladies' Code song) =

Single by Ladies' Code

from the album Code#02 Pretty Pretty
- Released: August 6, 2013
- Genre: K-pop; R&B; hip hop
- Length: 3:30
- Label: Polaris; CJ E&M
- Songwriter: Super Changddai
- Producer: Super Changddai

Ladies' Code singles chronology
"Bad Girl" (2013)	"Hate You" (2013)	"Pretty Pretty" (2013)

"Hate You" is a song recorded by South Korean girl group Ladies' Code. It was released as a digital single on August 6, 2013 by Polaris Entertainment and served as a pre-release track for their second mini-album Code#02 Pretty Pretty.

== Track listing ==
Track listing
No.	Title	Length
1.	"Hate You"	3:30
2.	"Hate You" (instrumental)	3:29
Total length:		6:59

== Charts ==
Chart	Peak position
Gaon Singles Chart	1
Billboard K-Pop Hot 100	2

=== Sales ===
Chart	Sales
Gaon digital sales	134,401+

== Release history ==
Country	Date	Format	Label
South Korea	August 6, 2013	Digital download	Polaris Entertainment; CJ E&M Music
Worldwide	August 6, 2013	Digital download	Polaris Entertainment; CJ E&M Music
