= Kwon Ri-se =

South Korean-Japanese singer (1991–2014)

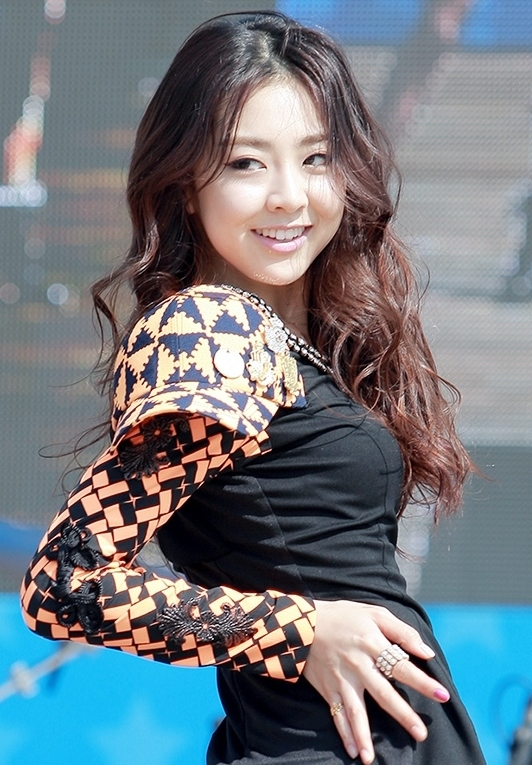
- Kwon in May 2013

Background information
- Born: August 16, 1991; Fukushima, Japan
- Died: September 7, 2014 (aged 23) Suwon, Gyeonggi, South Korea
- Genre: K-pop
- Occupation: Singer
- Years active: 2009–2014
- Label: Polaris
- Formerly of: Ladies' Code

Korean name
- Hangul: 권리세
- Hanja: 權梨世
- RR: Gwon Rise
- MR: Kwŏn Rise

Kwon Ri-se (August 16, 1991 – September 7, 2014), known professionally as Rise, was a South Korean singer. She was a member of the South Korean girl group Ladies' Code under Polaris Entertainment. Prior to her joining Ladies' Code, she was crowned "Miss Korea Japan Jin" in the Miss Korea Japan 2009 pageant and represented Japan in Miss Korea 2009. She was one of the Top 12 contestants of MBC's Star Audition The Great Birth. She died on September 7, 2014 at age 23 after succumbing to injuries she sustained from a car crash that occurred four days earlier.

== Biography ==
Kwon was born in Japan and was a third-generation Korean Japanese. She has one sister, Kwon Ri-ae, who participated in Miss Korea 2007. She attended Fukushima Korea Junior High School, Tokyo Korean School and completed her university education at Seikei University, majoring in Economics and Business Administration. Before joining Ladies' Code, Kwon was also active as a model and previously participated in Miss Korea 2009 as the Japan representative. She signed with KeyEast after Star Audition The Great Birth in 2011.

In 2011, Kwon appeared in the third season of MBC's reality show We Got Married, where she was paired up with former Birth of a Great Star contestant, David Oh. She also filmed a LG commercial for LG Optimus 3D with Oh in the same year.

In 2013, Kwon's contract with KeyEast expired and she went on to sign a contract with Polaris Entertainment as she wished to pursue a music career.

== Music career ==
On February 24, 2013, a teaser for Kwon was released on Polaris Entertainment's official YouTube channel. After a series of video teasers of the members of Ladies' Code, the music video for their debut was released on March 6, 2013. Their debut EP, Code#1 Bad Girl was released on March 7, 2013, through online music stores and the group performed on M Countdown on the same day.

Ladies' Code went on to release a second EP, Code#02 Pretty Pretty, on September 5, 2013, and two new singles, So Wonderful and Kiss Kiss, in February and August 2014.

== Death ==
After attending the recording of KBS Open Concert at DGIST and thus completing promotions for "Kiss Kiss", the group was returning to Seoul when at approximately 1:30 A.M. on September 3, 2014 (KST), Kwon was critically injured in a car crash. The group's manager, Mr. Park, who was driving the Hyundai Starex, had been speeding, driving 137 km/h (85 mph) in a 100 km/h (62 mph) zone for a distance of 30 km (19 miles). Rainy conditions made the road slippery, which caused Park to suddenly lose control of the vehicle, causing the group's van to hydroplane and skid several times before crashing into a protective wall in the vicinity of the Singal Junction on Yeongdong Expressway.

It was reported that none of the van's airbags deployed at the time of impact. By the time the paramedics arrived at the scene, Kwon's injuries were so severe that the paramedics were unable to identify her. Her bandmates Ashley and Zuny sustained minor injuries while bandmate Sojung sustained major injuries, and EunB was killed. Park and one stylist sustained minor injuries.

Kwon was immediately taken to the Catholic University of Korea St. Vincent's Hospital, where she was given emergency CPR before being taken into surgery due to suffering severe cranial and abdominal injuries. The surgeons operated on her cranial area three times while also having to resuscitate her via defibrillation during the procedures. In the midst of a fourth procedure for her back in the 11th hour of surgery, Kwon's blood pressure began to drop very rapidly, making it unsafe to continue. She was moved to the intensive care unit at Ajou University Hospital, where she remained in critical condition. It was reported that her brain was severely swollen and that she was not regaining consciousness, with the doctors closely monitoring her condition in order to safely resume surgery.

Kwon died at 10:10 am (KST) on September 7, 2014, in Ajou University Hospital, having never woken up from her coma. Her wake was held at Korea University Anam Hospital funeral home. Her funeral in South Korea was held at Seoul Memorial Park on September 9, 2014. Many prominent South Korean stars attended her funeral or sent flower wreaths including her former Birth of a Great Star mentor Lee Eun-mi, members of Super Junior, idol Roh Ji-hoon, Shinee, Kara, Bestie, Secret and more.

After the funeral, Kwon was cremated and her ashes were taken back to Japan, where another funeral was held for her family and close friends.

== Discography ==
=== Soundtrack appearances ===
Title	Year	Album	Track No.
"Hey Hey Hey"	2013	MBC Star Audition The Great Birth Part 1. (8090 Sing a song)	2

== Filmography ==
=== Television shows ===
Year	Title	Role	Notes
2010–2011	Star Audition The Great Birth	Herself	Top 12 contestant
2011	We Got Married	Herself	With David Oh
2013	Splash	Herself	
2013	It's a Person Q	Herself	
2013	1000 Song Challenge	Herself	
2013	Running Man	Herself	Episode 149
