= Kiss Kiss (Ladies' Code song) =

Single by Ladies' Code
- Released: August 7, 2014 (South Korea)
- Recorded: 2014
- Genre: K-pop; dance
- Length: 3:31
- Label: Polaris; LOEN
- Songwriter: Super Changddai

Ladies' Code singles chronology
"So Wonderful" (2014)	"Kiss Kiss" (2014)	"I'll Smile, Even if it Hurts" (2015)

"Kiss Kiss" (Korean: 키스 키스) is a song recorded by South Korean girl group Ladies' Code. It was released as a single album on August 7, 2014, by Polaris Entertainment and is the group's fifth single overall. This was the last release featuring members EunB and RiSe, around a month before their deaths in September 2014.

== Track listing ==
- The song was written, composed and arranged by Super Changddai.

No.	Title	Length
1.	"Kiss Kiss" (키스 키스)	3:31
2.	"Kiss Kiss (Instrumental)" (키스 키스 (Inst.))	3:31
Total length:		7:02

== Chart performance ==
=== Albums chart ===
Country	Chart	Peak position
South Korea (Gaon Music Chart)	Weekly albums chart	4
South Korea (Gaon Music Chart)	Monthly albums chart	26
South Korea (Gaon Music Chart)	Yearly albums chart	—

=== Singles chart ===
Chart	Peak position
Gaon Singles Chart	4

== Sales and certifications ==
Chart	Amount
Gaon physical sales	2,701
Gaon digital sales	117,512

== Release history ==
Region	Date	Format	Label	Catalog
South Korea	August 7, 2014	CD single, digital download	Polaris Entertainment; LOEN Entertainment	L200001034
Worldwide	August 7, 2014	Digital download	Polaris Entertainment; LOEN Entertainment	L200001034
