= Singal station =

Metro station in Yongin, South Korea

신갈; Singal
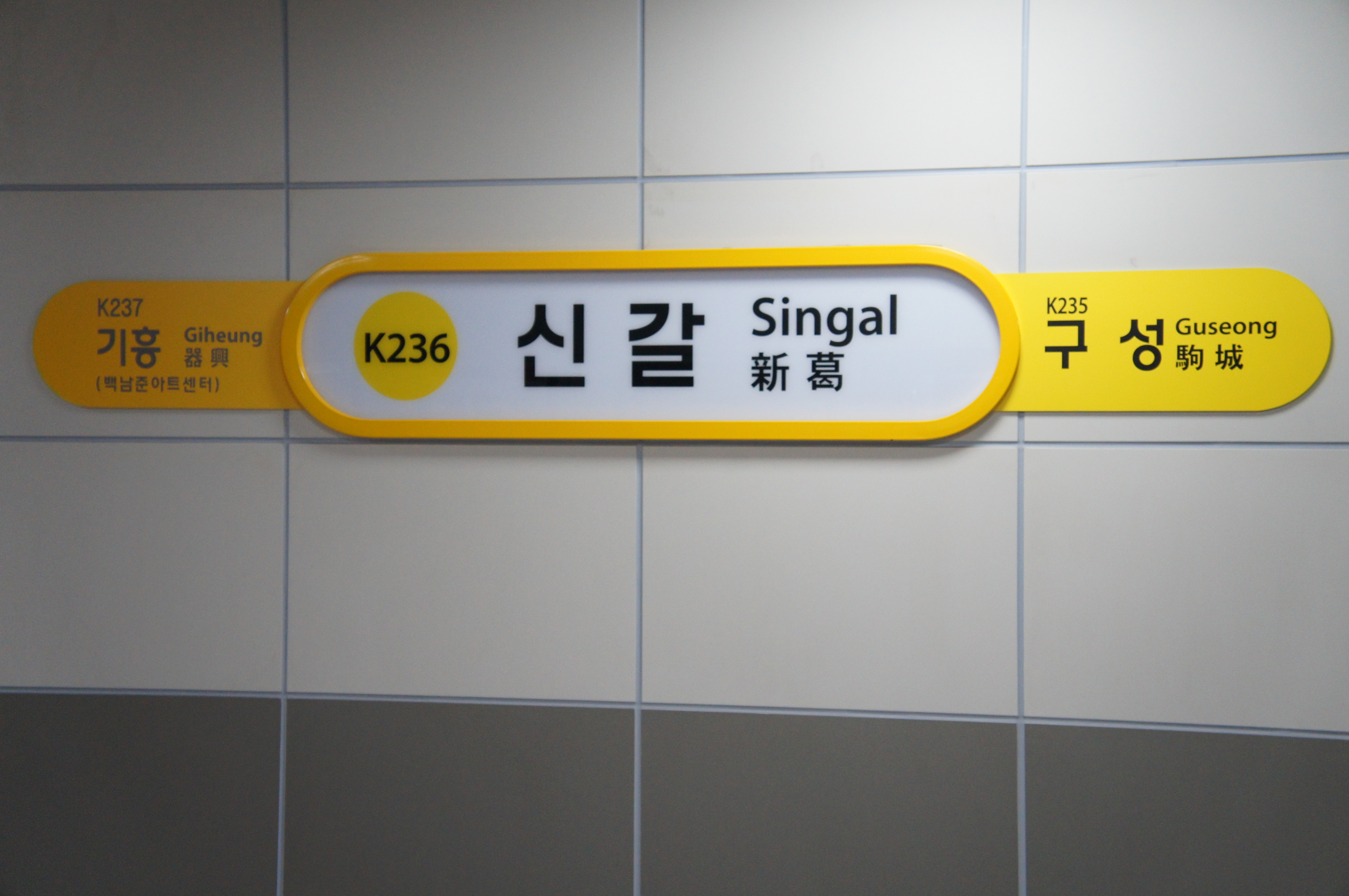

Korean name
- Hangul: 신갈역
- Hanja: 新葛驛
- Revised Romanization: Singallyeok
- McCune–Reischauer: Sin'gallyŏk

General information
- Location: 167 Singal-dong, Giheung-gu, Yongin-si, Gyeonggi-do
- Coordinates: 37°18′58″N 127°06′28″E
- Operator: Korail
- Line: Suin–Bundang Line
- Platforms: 2
- Tracks: 2

Construction
- Structure type: Underground

Key dates
- December 28, 2011: Suin–Bundang Line opened
Location

Singal Station is a subway station of the Suin–Bundang Line. It was opened in December 2011, as part of the Giheung extension of the Bundang Line.

A station on the now-abandoned, former Suryeo Line (1930–72) was also referred to by this name.

Preceding station	Seoul Metropolitan Subway	Following station
Guseong towards Cheongnyangni	Suin–Bundang Line	Giheung towards Incheon
