= Rumble Fish (band) =

South Korean rock band

- Origin: Seoul, South Korea
- Genres: K-pop
- Years active: 2003-2010
- Labels: Jino Music (2003-2005); Yejeon Media (2005-2007); Castle J Enterprise (2007-2008); Vitamin Entertainment (2008-2009); Atlantic Records (2009-2010)
- Past members: Choi Jin-yi; Kim Sung-gun; Kim Ho-ul; Park Chun-hwee

Rumble Fish (럼블피쉬) was a South Korean rock band. The group disbanded in 2010 after a majority of members left.

== Former members ==
- Kim Sung-gun (김성근, guitar)
- Kim Ho-il (김호일, bass)
- Park Chun-hwee (박천휘, drums)
- Choi Jin-yi (최진이, vocals, guitar)

== Discography ==
=== Albums ===
- Swing Attack, July 2004
- Have A Nice Dream, July 2005
- I Go (Digital Single), July 2006
- Open The Safe, March 2007
1. Fly
2. 봄이 되어 꽃은 피고
3. Smile Again
4. 사랑한다
5. 그 여자의 하루
6. In The End
7. Two-Time
8. 日常茶飯事 (일상다반사)
9. 이별...마시다
10. 거짓말
11. 월화수목금토일
12. Good-Bye
13. 봄이 되어 꽃은 피고 (Full Version)
- Open The Safe (Special Edition), July 2007
- Memory For You, November 2008
- One sweet day, October 2009
1. Intro
2. 너 정말이니
3. Let Me Love
4. Don't Stop
5. 엘리나
6. Lost In Paradise
7. Sorry
8. One Sweet Day
9. 앙코르 (Encore) (Unplugged Ver.)
10. 1994년 어느 늦은 밤
11. 내 사랑 내 곁에
12. 앙코르 (Encore)
13. 한 사람을 위한 마음

== Awards ==
=== Mnet Asian Music Awards ===
Year	Category	Work	Result
2005	Best Mixed Group	"Smile Again" (으라차차)	Nominated
2006	Best Rock Performance	"I Go"	Nominated
2007	Best Mixed Group	"Smile Again"	Nominated
