= The First Queen =

Korean musical

The First Queen (Korean: 뮤지컬 선덕여왕) is a musical about Queen Seondeok of the ancient Korean kingdom of Silla. It was adapted from the television series "The Great Queen Seondeok". It debuted at Woori Art Hall in Olympic Park, Seoul in January 2010 as South Korea's first original musical.

Lee So-jung starred as Seondeok, Cha Ji-yeon as Mishil, and Kang Tae-eul as the queen's lover, Bisham.

== See also ==
- Queen Seondeok (TV series)
