= So Wonderful =

Single by Ladies' Code
- Released: February 13, 2014 (South Korea)
- Genre: K-pop; dance
- Length: 7:16
- Label: Polaris; LOEN
- Songwriter: Super Changddai

Ladies' Code singles chronology
"Pretty Pretty" (2013)	"So Wonderful" (2014)	"Kiss Kiss" (2014)

"So Wonderful" is a song recorded by the South Korean girl group Ladies' Code. It was released as a digital single on February 13, 2014, by Polaris Entertainment. It is one of the best charting songs the group has released, with a peak position of 18 on the Billboard Hot 100 K-pop songs.

== Track listing ==
- All the songs in this album are written, composed and arranged by Super Changddai.

No.	Title	Length
1.	"So Wonderful"	3:38
2.	"So Wonderful (Instrumental)"	3:38
Total length:		7:16

== Charts and sales ==
Chart	Peak position
Gaon Singles Chart	14
Billboard K-Pop Hot 100	18

=== Sales ===
Chart	Amount
Gaon digital sales	383,707

== Release history ==
Country	Date	Format	Label
South Korea	February 13, 2014	Digital download	Polaris Entertainment; LOEN Entertainment
