= Rumble Fish (singer) =

South Korean singer (born 1982)

- 최진이
- Born: Choi Jin-yi; December 13, 1982 (age 43); Seoul, South Korea
- Occupation: Singer-songwriter
- Spouse: Yoon Woo-hyun (m. 2017)
- Musical career
- Genres: K-pop; rock; R&B
- Instruments: Vocals; guitar
- Years active: 2004–present
- Labels: Vitamin Entertainment; Castle J Enterprise; Polaris Entertainment; Kakao M
- Formerly of: Rumble Fish

Choi Jin-yi (Korean: 최진이; born December 13, 1982), better known by the stage name Rumble Fish (럼블피쉬), is a South Korean singer-songwriter. She was the main vocalist of Rumble Fish from 2004 to 2010. In 2010, she began her solo career with her debut EP, "I Am Me."

== Personal life ==
After seven years of dating, Choi married Buzz's guitarist, Yoon Woo-hyun, on March 26, 2017.

== Discography ==
=== Extended plays ===
Title	Album details	Peak chart positions		Sales
Title	Album details	KOR	Billboard US	Sales
I Am Me	Released： May 13, 2010; Label: Castle J Enterprise; Formats: CD, digital download; Track listing: 1. Intro; 2. Toxic; 3. Goodbye Love; 4. Don't Go; 5. My Boy	N/A	N/A	KOR: N/A; JPN: N/A
I Am Rumble Fish	Released： January 15, 2014; Label: Polaris Entertainment, LOEN Entertainment; Formats: CD, digital download; Track listing: 1. Falling Out; 2. Bad Song; 3. Call It In; 4. Don't Do That; 5. One Snowy Night	91	32	KOR: N/A; JPN: N/A

=== Soundtrack appearances ===
Year	Title	Drama
2011	"사랑은 잔인하게 쓰여진다"	New Tales of Gisaeng OST
2013	"Tell Me That You Love Me"	Gold Out! OST
2013	"Love That Can't Be Erased" (지울수없는 사랑)	Jang Ok-jung, Living by Love OST

=== As featuring artist ===
Title	Year	Peak chart positions		Sales	Album
Title	Year	KOR	US World	Sales	Album
"I'm Fine, Thank You" (Ladies' Code feat Kim Bum-soo, IVY, Han Hee-jun, Rumble Fish, and Sun Woo)	2015	3	—	KOR: N/A	Non-album single
"—" denotes that the release did not chart in that region.
