= Myst3ry =

Single album by Ladies' Code
- Released: February 24, 2016
- Genre: K-pop; R&B; ballad
- Length: 10:40
- Label: Polaris; Blockberry Creative; Bugs; Universal Music

Ladies' Code chronology
| "I'll Smile, Even if it Hurts" (2015) | Myst3ry (2016) | Strang3r (2016) |

"Myst3Re:"

Myst3ry ("mystery") is the first single album recorded by South Korean girl group Ladies' Code. The album debuted at number fourteen on Gaon Album Chart. The lead single, "Galaxy", peaked at number thirteen on Gaon Download Chart with 52,040 downloads in four days and number thirty-six on Gaon Single Chart.

== Background ==
On September 3, 2014, the group was involved in a car accident that ultimately claimed the lives of members EunB and RiSe. In the following months, the remaining members went on hiatus to focus on their physical and mental recovery, eventually resuming practice schedules while continuing to receive counseling and follow-up medical treatment.

On January 23, 2016, Ladies' Code announced their upcoming comeback as a trio. They released the EP Myst3ry and title track "Galaxy" on February 24.

== Music video ==
Released February 24, 2016, the music video for "Galaxy" was directed by Jo Bum-jin and VM Project and choreographed by Kim Hwa-young.

== Release and promotion ==
Myst3ry was released in South Korea on February 24, 2016, as their first major release since the fatal car accident. Due to the sensitive nature of the group's return, Polaris Entertainment reported that variety show appearances would be limited to avoid misunderstanding. The group would instead focus on the musical aspects of the release.

== Track listing ==
Standard edition
| No. | Title | Writer(s) | Length |
|---|---|---|---|
| 1. | "My Flower" | Lee Joo Hyung (MonoTree), NOPARI | 3:07 |
| 2. | "Galaxy" | G-High, Choi Yeong Gyeong (MonoTree) | 3:32 |
| 3. | "Chaconne" | Chu Dae Kwan (MonoTree) | 4:01 |
| Total length: | | | 10:40 |

== Myst3Re: and remixes ==
A remix version of the single titled "Myst3Re:" was released March 30, 2016. "Chaconne (Arieta Mix)" was used as the lead track for this new version.

Myst3Re:
| No. | Title | Writer(s) | Length |
|---|---|---|---|
| 1. | "My Flower (Blossom Mix)" | Lee Joo Hyung (MonoTree), NOPARI | 3:10 |
| 2. | "Galaxy (The 3dge Mix)" | G-High, Choi Yeong Gyeong (MonoTree) | 3:33 |
| 3. | "Chaconne (Arieta Mix)" | Chu Dae Gwan (MonoTree) | 3:46 |
| Total length: | | | 10:30 |

== Charts ==
=== Myst3ry ===
==== Weekly charts ====
| Chart (2016) | Peak position |
|---|---|
| South Korean Albums (Gaon) | 14 |

=== "Galaxy" ===
| Chart (2016) | Peak position |
|---|---|
| South Korean Downloads (Gaon) | 13 |
| South Korean Singles (Gaon) | 36 |

== Release history ==
| Region | Date | Format | Label | Catalog |
|---|---|---|---|---|
| South Korea | February 24, 2016 | CD; digital download | Polaris; BlockBerryCreative; Bugs; Universal Music | DK-0887 |
