= Love Will Set You Free (disambiguation) =

"Love Will Set You Free" is a song by Engelbert Humperdinck, the UK entry for the Eurovision Song Contest 2012.

Love Will Set You Free may also refer to:

- "Love Will Set You Free", a song by Whitesnake from Forevermore, 2011
- "Love Will Set You Free (Theme from Solarbabies)", a song by Smokey Robinson, 1986

== See also ==
- "Only Love Will Set You Free", a song by Elkie Brooks from Bookbinder's Kid, 1988
