= Danpyunsun and the Sailors =

South Korean musical group

- Origin: South Korea
- Genres: Psychedelic rock, chamber pop
- Years active: 2013-present
- Labels: Audioguy
- Members: Danpyunsun (Vocal, Guitar); Jang Dohyuk (Percussion); Choi Wooyoung (Bass); Jang Soohyun (violin)
- Past members: Kwon Jeeyoung (Violin)
- Website: danpyunsun.tumblr.com

Danpyunsun and the Sailors (Korean : 단편선과 선원들) is a four-piece group that was formed in 2013, with veteran folk musician Hoegidong Danpyunsun at the center. The members, whose resumes cover a diverse range of music from classical and jazz to folk pop and experimental rock, continue to push for a new pop sound with a mixture of both Eastern and Western influences.

== Career ==
- Aug. 23, 2013. EBS Space Sympathy Debut
- Apr. 24, 2014. Naver OnStage 179th 'To Make Teammates'
- Aug. 30, 2014. Hongdae KT&G SangsangMadang Live Hall Showcase <Animal>
- Oct. 2014. MU:CON’s Choice
- Dec. 28, 2014, The Hankyoreh - 3rd Place of Album of the Year 2014 <Animal>
- Apr. 2015. Seoul Art Market PAMs Choice
- May. 2015. Danpyunsun and the Sailors was selected KTandG SangsangMadang Surround Program
- May. 31. 2015. Soundholic Festival "EXIT"
- Nov. 8. 2015. Regards sur la Coree, "Hongdae Night" with Wall of Death at Point Ephemere in Paris
- Nov. 26~27. EBS Space Sympathy with Yun Youngbae
- Apr. 23, 2016. Hongdae KT&G SangsangMadang Live Hall Showcase <Shofar>
- May. 28, 2016 Brighton in U.K, "The Great Escape Festival"
- Jun. 14–15, 2016. EBS Space Sympathy Record of Iron and Wood
- Aug. 13. 2016. Pentaport Rock Festival in Inchon
- Sep. 29. 2016. OzAsia Festival in Adelaide
- Oct. 2016. MU:CON’s Choice
- Oct. 3. 2016. Zandari Festa in Hongdae
- Oct. 21. 2016. London Richmix, "K-Music Festival 2016 "
- Mar. 2017. The band was selected Seoul Youth Artist.
- May. 14. 2017. Veloso at Mangwon, Single <Love Song> showcase.

== Discography ==
=== Studio albums ===
Title	Album details
Animal (동물)	Released: August 27, 2014; Label: Pison Contents; Formats: CD, digital download; Track listing: 1. "A Hundred Years" (백년); 2. "Yellow Room" (노란방); 3. "Ball" (공); 4. "Walk with Me" (동행); 5. "Bud" (순); 6. "Purifier" (소독차); 7. "Hill" (언덕); 8. "Wasteland" (황무지); 9. "We Are" (우리는)
Shofar (뿔)	Released: April 19, 2016; Label: Audioguy; Formats: CD, digital download; Track listing: 1. "Appearance" (발생); 2. "Shofar" (뿔); 3. "High and Low" (모든 곳에); 4. "Giant" (거인; featuring Kwak Pureunhaneul); 5. "Lover" (연애; featuring Kim Sawol); 6. "Ground" (흙); 7. "Daytime" (낮); 8. "And When" (그리고 언제쯤); 9. "Fire" (불); 10. "The Strange Throat" (이상한 목)

=== Singles ===
Title	Year	Album
"Lover" (연애) (featuring Kim Sawol)	2016	Shofar
"Hasta" (날) (with Choi Sam)	2016	Non-album singles
"National Anthem" (국가)	2016	Non-album singles
"Love Song"	2017	Non-album singles

== Awards and nominations ==
Year	Award	Category	Nominated work	Result	Ref.
2015	Korean Music Awards	Album of the Year	Animal	Nominated	
2015	Korean Music Awards	Best Rock Album	Animal	Won	
2015	Korean Music Awards	Musician of the Year	—	Nominated	
2015	Korean Music Awards	Best Rock Song	"Ball"	Nominated	
2017	Korean Music Awards	Album of the Year	Shofar	Nominated	
2017	Korean Music Awards	Best Rock Album	Shofar	Nominated	
2017	Korean Music Awards	Musician of the Year	—	Nominated	
