= Ivy (South Korean singer) =

South Korean singer (born 1982)

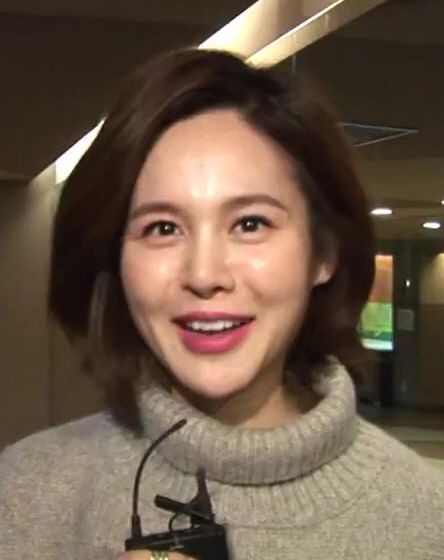
- Ivy in 2013

Background information
- Born: Park Eun-hye; November 7, 1982 (age 43); Singil-dong, Yeongdeungpo District, Seoul, South Korea
- Genres: K-pop; R&B; ballad; dance-pop
- Occupations: Singer; musical actress
- Years active: 2005–present
- Labels: Fantom; Chocolate E&TF; Polaris; Creative i

Korean name
- Hangul: 박은혜
- RR: Bak Eunhye
- MR: Pak Ŭnhye

Park Eun-hye (Korean: 박은혜; born November 7, 1982), better known by the stage name Ivy (아이비), is a South Korean singer and musical actress.

== Career ==
=== 2005: Debut ===
A former JYPE trainee, Ivy first appeared in Lee Soo Young's music video "Holding onto the Flowers" in 2005. She officially debuted as a singer in 2005 with the single "What Happened Tonight" (오늘밤 일). Her official second single "A-ha" was an uptempo R&B single whose dance routine was famously parodied by Park Kyung-lim on X-Man. Around the same time, Ivy also promoted "I Am a Fool" (바본가봐), a ballad, which was performed in conjunction with "A ha". The album placed 48th for the year. Although inactive for most of 2006, she has collaborated with Shinhwa for their album State of the Art on the track "Highway Star".

=== 2007–2008: Breakthrough, controversy and hiatus ===
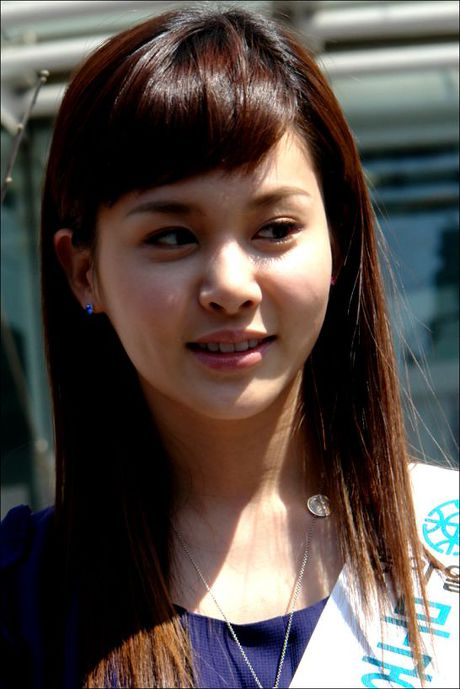
Ivy in 2007

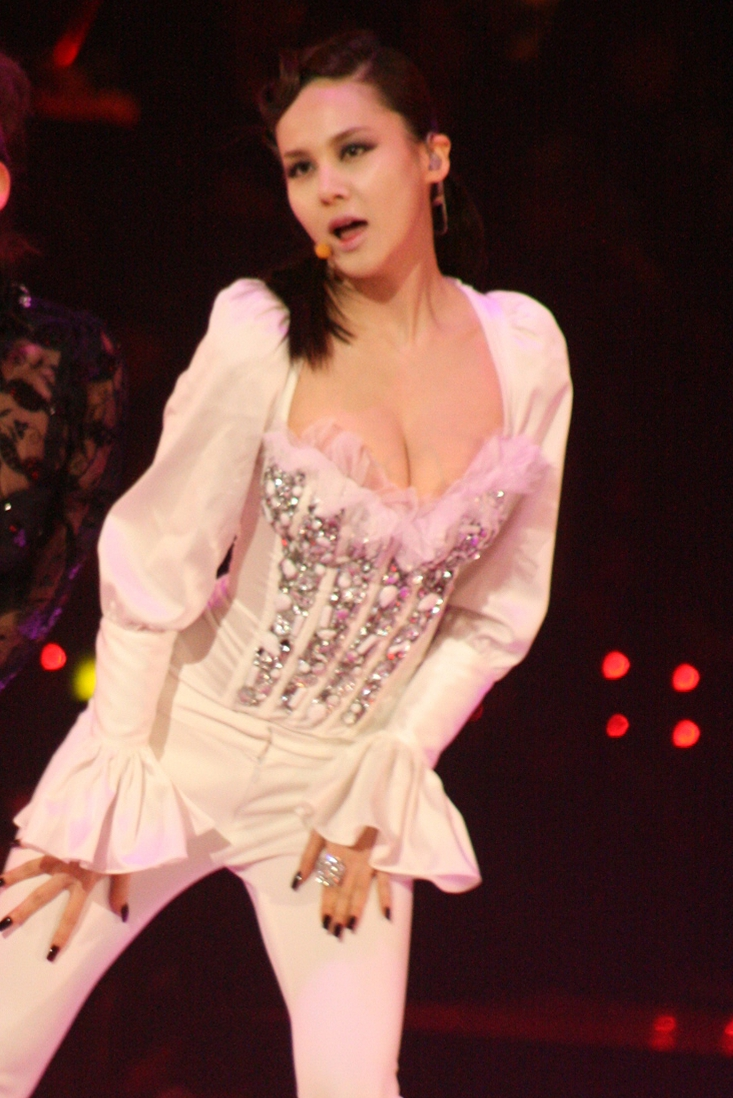
Ivy in 2009

On February 12, 2007, Ivy's second album, Vol. 2 – A Sweet Moment, was released, with the lead single "Sonata of Temptation", which sampled Beethoven's Fur Elise, performing very well on the charts. Due to the song's popularity, she received the 2007 M.net KM Music Festival award for Best Female Solo Artist. Despite its success, the song's music video caused controversy, as it recreated a fight scene between Tifa Lockhart and Loz from Final Fantasy VII Advent Children, without proper permission (the disclaimer appearing on the video did not satisfy the rights to use it). In April, the Seoul Central District Court banned the music video from being shown on television, stating that "Most of the clip is noticeably similar to scenes from the film". The story has received coverage on gaming blogs internationally, including Kotaku, which noted that the director has stated that he was unable to find the contact info for Square Enix.

On June 23, 2007, Ivy performed at American singer Christina Aguilera's Seoul concert as part of her Back to Basics Tour. Aguilera reportedly viewed video clips sent in by South Korean artists, as she wanted to choose the best. The artists were viewed for their dancing and singing abilities, as well as album sales. She performed as the opening act for the first concert on the first day, while Lee Min-woo of Shinhwa performed the following day.

In 2008, under the pseudonym "The Lighthouse", she wrote the lyrics for "Dear Mom..." for Girls' Generation's mini album Gee, and "마지막 선물" ("Last Gift") for Shinee's first album The Shinee World. The songs were composed by her boyfriend Kim Tae-Sung.

Ivy had a supporting role in the joint South Korean Japanese 2008 mini-drama series "Tokyo Sun Showers" as Eun Bi, an aspiring singer.

On September 24, 2009, she was announced to feature on MC Mong's repackaged album "Horror Show" in the song "나는..." ("I Am..."). The song was released on October 26, 2009, with a promotional video on the same day.

=== 2009: Comeback ===
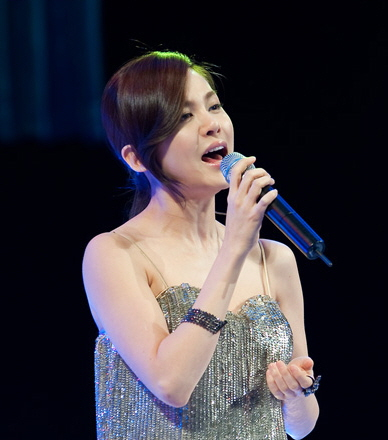
at the 2009 Korean Contents Awards

After having her comeback further delayed by problems with her management company, Ivy released her third album "I Be..", with contributions from artists such as PSY and Nam Gyu-ri. She also switched from Fantom Entertainment to De Chocolate E&TF.

The first song released was "눈물아 안녕" ("Goodbye Tears"), along with a promotional video. The song reached No. 1 on various online charts. However, her title song was chosen to be "Touch Me", a techno dance track written by PSY. The music video was released on October 23, 2009. However, it was banned from broadcast three days later for being too inappropriate for viewing of minors with its sexual references.

Ivy also stars in her own 13-episode reality show on M.net called "IVY BACK", the first episode airing on October 27, 2009. After performing a special showcase for her new album, Ivy officially made her comeback debut with "Touch Me" on SBS's Inkigayo on November 1, 2009.

Due to problems between Ivy's ex-management company and MBC and KBS, she is unable to perform on weekly music shows such as "Music Core" and "Music Bank". Instead, she is only allowed to promote on M.net's M!Countdown. However, she was later given approval to perform and appear on SBS programs.

On December 13, 2009, Ivy returned for the second time on Inkigayo since her comeback with "Goodbye Tears". Promotions for her third album ended on January 24, 2010.

On January 10, 2010, Ivy's social security number was leaked onto the internet after an article reporting about an episode of IVY BACK failed to censor it out in a photo of Ivy holding her documents. Her company has stated they will take legal action against the netizens who have hacked into Ivy's personal accounts.

=== 2012–present: Comeback and Broadway debut ===
On March 27, 2012, Ivy released a mini album titled Interview which featured five ballad-type songs. The song "찢긴 가슴"("Broken Heart"), which was released with a music video, was chosen as the lead single. It debuted on the Mnet Pop singles chart at 18.

In 2013, Ivy made her comeback with the lead single of her new album titled "I Dance" featuring Yubin of the Wonder Girls.

In 2022, Ivy held a two-day solo concert 'NEXT PAGE' at Nodeul Island Live House in Yongsan District, Seoul on August 13 and 14.

On August 17, 2026, Ivy will make her Broadway debut as Roxie Hart in the revival of Chicago.

== Discography ==
=== Studio albums ===
Title	Album details	Peak chart positions	Sales
Title	Album details	KOR	Sales
My Sweet and Free Day	Released: July 19, 2005; Label: Yiga Entertainment; Format: CD, cassette; Track listing: 1. 오늘밤 일 2. Dawn Dawn Dawn; 3. Poison Ivy; 4. 난 5. 바본가봐; 6. Do It; 7. A-Ha; 8. 날 가지려면; 9. 기도... (Intro); 10. 기도; 11. 고백; 12. One Step; 13. 낡은 자전거; 14. 델마와 루이스 (feat. Bobby Kim); 15. 다 줄께	14	KOR: 40,420+
A Sweet Moment	Released: February 12, 2007; Label: Fantom Entertainment; Format: CD, cassette; Track listing: 1. Cupido; 2. 유혹의 소나타; 3. 이럴거면; 4. Ever; 5. 1 To 10; 6. 이별이 다 그렇죠; 7. 그날까지; 8. 좋아; 9. The Message (from IVY); 10. 사랑아 어떻게; 11. Nu Trend; 12. Gotta Do; 13. Antonio's Song; 14. I Know	No data	No data
I Be..	Released: October 29, 2009; Label: D.Chocolate E&TF; Format: CD, cassette; Track listing: 1. Sensation; 2. Crazy; 3. Touch Me; 4. 눈물아 안녕; 5. You Are The Ace (feat. JR Groove); 6. Good; 7. 왜 나만 아프죠; 8. Adios; 9. 여자라서; 10. 안돼요 (feat. Day Day); 11. Left 2 Right; 12. 어차피 잊어야 할 사람; 13. Zoo (feat. Gil-me); 14. Peek-A-Boo; 15. 보란듯이; 16. Touch Me (Electro Mix)	No data	No data

=== Extended plays ===
Title	Album details	Peak chart positions	Sales
Title	Album details	KOR	Sales
Interview	Released: April 27, 2012; Label: Polaris Entertainment; Format: CD, digital download; Track listing: 1. 찢긴 가슴; 2. Firefly; 3. 꽃 4. 영화처럼; 5. Someday	12	KOR: 3,112+
I Dance	Released: June 16, 2013; Label: Polaris Entertainment; Format: CD, digital download; Track listing: 1. Missing You; 2. I Dance (feat. Yubin); 3. Complicated; 4. Summer Holiday; 5. 남자 때문에; 6. 아마조네스	12	KOR: 1,579+

=== Singles ===
Title	Year	Peak chart positions	Sales	Album
Title	Year	KOR	Sales	Album
"I'm A Fool" (바본가봐)	2005	—N/a	—N/a	My Sweet And Free Day
"Cat's Eye" (캣츠아이)	2006	—N/a	—N/a	Cashcat Cosmetic CF BGM
"Sonata Of Temptation" (유혹의 소나타)	2007	—N/a	—N/a	A Sweet Moment
"Touch Me"	2009	—N/a	—N/a	I Be..
"Torn Heart" (찢긴 가슴)	2012	4	KOR: 812,341	Interview
"I Dance" (feat. Yubin)	2013	13	KOR: 473,855	I Dance
"I'm Fine Thank You" (with Kim Bum-soo, Rumble Fish, Sunwoo, Han Hee-jun, Sojung)	2015	—	—N/a	non-album single
"The Woman" (with Noday)	2015	—	—N/a	Newtype EDM Vol. 2 (NODAY X Ivy)
"—" denotes releases that did not chart or were not released in that region.

=== Soundtrack appearances ===
Title	Year	Peak chart positions	Sales	Album
Title	Year	KOR	Sales	Album
"Good Person" (좋은 사람)	2012	54	KOR: 126,359+	The Chaser OST Part 3
"Memories of You" (너였나봐)	2013	18	KOR: 167,857+	Incarnation of Money OST Part 4
"Do You Know My Heart?" (내 맘을 아나요)	2014	91	KOR: 23,682+	Gunman in Joseon OST Part 5
"When The Cold Wind Blows" (찬바람이 불면)	2017	—	—N/a	The Lady in Dignity OST Part 1
"Day by Day"	2017	—	—N/a	Bravo My Life OST Part 1
"The Land I Long For" (그리운 땅) (with Ensemble)	2019	—	—N/a	Ben-Hur: The Musical OST
"—" denotes releases that did not chart or were not released in that region.

=== Compilation appearances ===
Title	Year	Peak chart positions	Sales	Album
Title	Year	KOR	Sales	Album
"Invitation" (초대)	2013	—	—N/a	Immortal Songs: Singing the Legend (Uhm Jung-hwa Part.2)
"Love is Like a Glass" (사랑은 유리 같은 것)	2013	—	—N/a	Immortal Songs: Singing the Legend (Youth Parade Special)
"White Butterfly" (하얀 나비)	2013	—	—N/a	Immortal Songs: Singing the Legend (Kim Jun-ho)
"Again" (또)	2013	—	—N/a	Immortal Songs: Singing the Legend (In Sooni)
"Soyanggang Girl" (소양강 처녀)	2013	—	—N/a	Immortal Songs: Singing the Legend (Lunar New Year Special)
"Beautiful Pain" (아름다운 아픔)	2013	—	—N/a	Immortal Songs: Singing the Legend (Kim Min-jong)
"Windmill that Doesn't Spin" (돌지 않는 풍차)	2013	—	—N/a	Immortal Songs: Singing the Legend (Moon Joo-ran)
"If I Had a Lover" (나에게 애인이 있다면)	2013	—	—N/a	Immortal Songs: Singing the Legend (Heartthrob Special with Nam Jin)
"When We Meet Again" (우리 다시 만나면)	2016	—	—N/a	United Korea 4 the World
"Cheer Up"	2016	—	—N/a	Singderella Special Song Vol.4
"Your Eyes" (눈동자) (with Min Woo-hyuk)	2017	—	—N/a	Immortal Songs: Singing the Legend (Uhm Jung-hwa)
"I" (난) (as Gypsy Woman)	2018	—	—N/a	King of Mask Singer: Episode 140
"—" denotes releases that did not chart or were not released in that region.

== Filmography ==
Year	Title	Role
2005	Nonstop 5	Herself
2005	Banjun Drama	Herself
2006–2007	High Kick!	special patient (ep.97)
2008	Tokyo Sun Shower	Eun-bi
2013	Monstar	Shim Eun-ha (adult / ep.5)
2015, 2018	King of Mask Singer	Contestant
2017	Borg Mom	Do Do-hye

== Theater ==
Year	Title	Role	Ref.
2010	Kiss Me Kate	Lois Lane	
2012	Chicago	Roxie Hart	
2013–2014	Ghost the Musical	Molly Jensen	
2014–2016	Chicago	Roxie Hart	
2015	Urinetown	Hope Cladwell	
2016	Wicked	Glinda Upland	
2016–2017	Aida	Amneris	
2017	Ben-Hur the Musical	Esther	
2017–2018	Memories of Matsuko the Musical	Matsuko Kawajiri	
2018	Red Book	Anna	
2018–2019	Chicago	Roxie Hart	
2018–2019	Jekyll & Hyde	Lucy Harris	
2019–2020	Aida	Amneris	
2020	Rent	Mimi Marquez	
2020–2021	Ghost the Musical	Molly Jensen	
2021	Chicago	Roxie Hart	
2021	Red Book	Anna	
2021–2022	Jekyll & Hyde	Lucy Harris	
2022	Aida	Amneris	
2022–2023	Moulin Rouge	Satine	
2023	2:22 A GHOST STORY	Jenny	
2023–2024	Dracula	Mina Murray	
2024–2025	Chicago	Roxie Hart	
2025	Jekyll & Hyde	Lucy Harris	
2025	Red Book	Anna	

== Awards ==
Year	Award	Category	Nominated work	Result	Ref.
2005	Golden Disc Awards	Rookie of the Year	"What Happened Tonight" (오늘밤 일)	Won	
2005	SBS Gayo Daejeon	Rookie Award	—N/a	Won	
2007	Cyworld Digital Music Awards	Song of the Month (March)	"Sonata of Temptation"	Won	
2007	Golden Disc Awards	Digital Song of the Year (Daesang)	"If You're Gonna Be Like This" (이럴 거면)	Won	
2007	Golden Disc Awards	Digital Song Bonsang	"If You're Gonna Be Like This" (이럴 거면)	Won	
2007	Mnet Km Music Festival	Best Female Artist	"Sonata of Temptation"	Won	
2007	Mnet 20's Choice Awards	Most Popular Female Artist	—N/a	Won	
2012	Korean Musical Awards	Best New Actress	Chicago	Won	
2018	Yegreen Musical Award	Best Actress	Red Book	Won	
