= Strang3r =

EP by Ladies' Code
- Released: October 13, 2016
- Genre: R&B; Soul
- Language: Korean
- Label: Polaris; Blockberry Creative

Ladies' Code chronology
Myst3ry (2016)	Strang3r (2016)	The Last Holiday (2018)

Singles from Strang3r
- 1. "Galaxy" Released: February 24, 2016; 2. "Chaconne" Released: March 30, 2016; 3. "The Rain" Released: October 13, 2016

Strang3r ("stranger") is the third extended play by South Korean girl group Ladies' Code and their first without EunB and RiSe. It was released on October 13, 2016 and contains six tracks, including three remixes of songs from the group's single album, Myst3ry, along with the title track "The Rain".

== Background and release ==
In September 2016 it was reported that Ladies' Code would release a new extended play in mid-October, which had been in preparation since March. On October 2, it was confirmed that the EP's title track would be called "The Rain", and would be an "emotional dance song with a melody that fits Ladies’ Code’s individuality". On October 9, a teaser for the title track's music video was released. The extended play was released on October 13 along with the title track "The Rain".

== Track listing ==
No.	Title	Lyrics	Music	Length
1.	"Lorelei"	Shin Agnes (MonoTree)	Shin Agnes (MonoTree), Chu Dae-kwan (MonoTree), Nopari	3:16
2.	"The Rain"	GDLO, Hwang Hyun (MonoTree), Shin Agnes (MonoTree)	Hwang Hyun (MonoTree), Oreo	3:33
3.	"Jane Doe"	GDLO	G-High, Choi Young-kyung	3:35
4.	"My Flower" (Blossom Mix)	Lee Ju-hyung (MonoTree)	NOPARI	3:10
5.	"Galaxy" (The 3dge Mix)	G-High, GDLO (MonoTree)	G-High	3:33
6.	"Chaconne" (Arieta Mix)	Park Ji-young	Chu Dae-kwan (MonoTree)	3:46
Total length:				20:53
