= Pungdeng-E =

South Korean musical group

- Also known as: PDE
- Origin: Seoul, South Korea
- Genres: Dance, Electronica, Hip hop
- Years active: 2013–2019
- Labels: DOMA Entertainment
- Members: Blue (Jung Ga-hee), Yellow (Kim Eun-bi)
- Past members: Red (Lee Hee-jin)

Pungdeng-E (풍뎅이) is a South Korean female music trio formed in December 2013. One of their original concepts was the use of different regional Korean dialects where each member uses her own local dialect. They are known to have unique lyrics and videos. The members modeled together for the Korean cosmetics brand Seed & Tree. Pungdeng-E performed on the first and third day of the 42nd Los Angeles Korean Festival in California on November 2, 2015. The groups first Japanese performance was on November 28, 2015 in Ōta, Tokyo.

== Discography ==
=== Extended plays ===
Title	Album details	Peak chart positions
Title	Album details	KOR
Pungdeng Pungdeng Go (풍뎅이 풍뎅이 Go)	Released: February 5, 2014 (KOR); Label: DOMA Entertainment; Formats: CD, digital download	51
Pipipapa (ピピパパ)	Released: February 18, 2017 (JPN); Label: JAKOL; Formats: CD, digital download	—

=== Singles ===
- 알탕 (2013)
- 잘탕 (2013)
- 축구 응원가 (2014)
- 액션 (2014)
- 역전 (2015)
- 삐삐빠빠 (2015)
- 크리스마스 캐롤 (2016)
- Stay (2017)
- 카마야또 (2018)
- 여름송 '면발' (2018)
- 2018 월드컵송 (2018)
- Sparkling (2018, with New Town Boyz)
- Super Market (2018)
- Nice Shot (2019)
