= Code 02 Pretty Pretty =

Code#02 Pretty Pretty

EP by Ladies' Code
- Released: September 6, 2013
- Recorded: 2013
- Genres: K-pop; dance; ballad
- Length: 16:20
- Language: Korean
- Labels: Polaris; CJ E&M

Ladies' Code chronology
Code#01 Bad Girl (2013)	Code#02 Pretty Pretty (2013)	Strang3r (2016)

Singles from Code #02 Pretty Pretty
- 1. "Hate You" Released: August 6, 2013; 2. "Pretty Pretty" Released: September 6, 2013; 3. "I'm Fine Thank You" Released: September 15, 2014

Code#02 Pretty Pretty is the second extended play by South Korean girl group Ladies' Code and their last before the 2014 car crash that killed members EunB and RiSe. It was released on September 6, 2013, through Polaris Entertainment and CJ E&M Music. The album was promoted with three singles. The lead single "Hate You" was released on August 6, 2013. The title track "Pretty Pretty" was released as the second single on September 6, 2013, along with the album. The third and final single "I'm Fine Thank You" was released on September 15, 2014, as a tribute to EunB and RiSe.

== Track listing ==
All tracks are written by Super Changddai.

No.	Title	Length
1.	"Polaris Club"	1:43
2.	"Pretty Pretty" (예뻐 예뻐; Yeppeo Yeppeo)	3:33
3.	"Hate You"	3:30
4.	"I'm Fine Thank You"	4:01
5.	"Pretty Pretty" (Instrumental) (예뻐 예뻐 (Instrumental); Yeppeo Yeppeo (Instrumental))	3:33
Total length:		16:20

== Charts ==
Country	Chart	Peak position
South Korea (Gaon)	Weekly Albums Chart	14
South Korea (Gaon)	Monthly Albums Chart	31
South Korea (Gaon)	Yearly Albums Chart	—

== Sales and certifications ==
Chart	Amount
Gaon physical sales	2,768+

== Release history ==
Region	Date	Format	Label	Catalog
South Korea	September 6, 2013	CD; digital download	Polaris; CJ E&M	CMCC-10156
