= Han Hee-jun =

South Korean singer (born 1989)

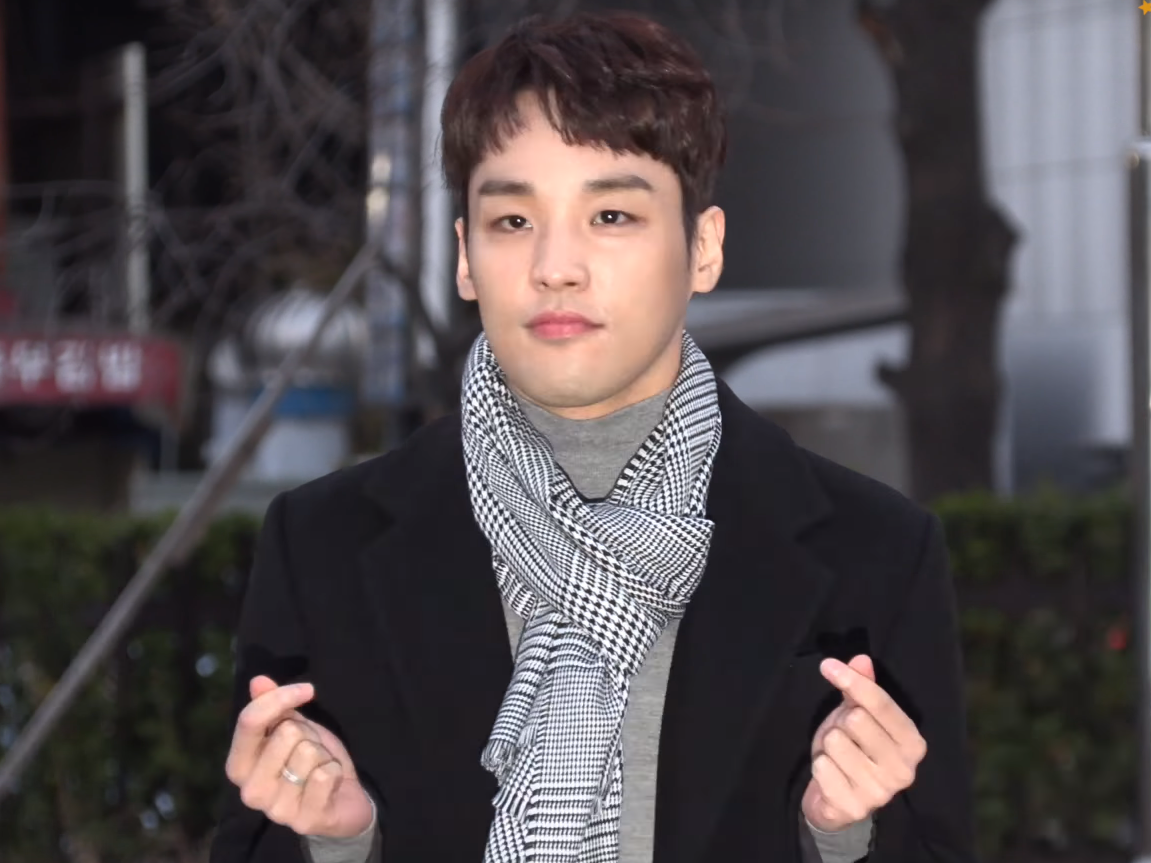
- Han in 2018

Background information
- Also known as: Heejun Han
- Born: April 20, 1989 (age 37); Anyang, Gyeonggi, South Korea
- Origin: Flushing, New York, U.S.
- Genres: Pop, R&B
- Occupation: Singer
- Years active: 2012–present
- Label: Polaris Entertainment

Korean name
- Hangul: 한희준
- RR: Han Huijun
- MR: Han Hŭijun

Han Hee-jun (Korean: 한희준; born April 20, 1989), also known as Heejun Han, is a South Korean singer. He finished in ninth place on the eleventh season of American Idol in 2012. He also finished in the top six of K-pop Star 3 in 2014. In 2026, Han began promoting under the name Jude.

== Early life ==
Han was born on April 20, 1989 in Anyang, Gyeonggi, South Korea. He has an older brother. Han and his family immigrated to the United States when he was 12, moving to Flushing, Queens in New York. He graduated from Francis Lewis High School.

Han returned to South Korea from 2009 to 2010 to train to be a singer. When he moved back to the United States, Han worked for the non-profit Milal Mission in New York, working with children with disabilities. He later said the experience pulled him out of a depression and that the children motivated him to audition for American Idol.

== Career ==
=== 2012: American Idol ===
Han auditioned for the eleventh season of American Idol in Pittsburgh, Pennsylvania in early 2012. He received praise from the judges for his performance of Michael Bolton's "How Am I Supposed to Live Without You" and advanced to the next round.

Han advanced through the semi-finals with a performance of "Angels" by Robbie Williams. He then advanced through the finals with performances of "All in Love Is Fair" by Stevie Wonder, "Right Here Waiting" by Richard Marx and "My Life" by Billy Joel. However, after finishing in the bottom three for two weeks in a row, Han was eliminated from the show, finishing in ninth place.

After the show concluded, Han performed as part of the American Idols Live! Tour 2012, which began July 6, 2012 and ran until September 21, 2012.

==== Performances and results ====
Episode	Song choice	Result
Audition	"How Am I Supposed to Live Without You"	Advanced
Hollywood 1	"How Am I Supposed to Live Without You"	Advanced
Hollywood 2	"Broken Strings" (with Phillip Phillips, Richie Law and Jairon Jackson)	Advanced
Las Vegas	"I Only Have Eyes for You"	Advanced
Final Judgment	"New York State of Mind"	Advanced
Top 25 (13 Men)	"Angels"	Advanced
Top 13	"All in Love Is Fair"	Safe
Top 11	"Right Here Waiting"	Safe
Top 10	"My Life"	Bottom 3
Top 9	"A Song for You"	Eliminated

=== 2013–2014: Debut single and K-pop Star 3 ===
Han released his debut single, "Bring the Love Back", featuring rapper Pusha T, on September 17, 2013.

In 2013, he tried out for the third season of K-pop Star and passed the audition. He reached the Top 6 of K-pop Star 3.

=== 2015–present: Korean releases and After School Club ===
Since then he has concentrated on his K-pop career and released the single "Q&A" feat. Tiffany from Girls' Generation.

In 2018, he replaced Jae of Day6 as co-host of After School Club.

In 2026, Han announced he would begin promoting under the name Jude.

== Discography ==
=== Singles ===
Title	Year	Album
"Bring the Love Back" (feat. Pusha T)	2013	Non-album singles
"QnA" (with Tiffany)	2015	Non-album singles
"I'm Fine Thank You" (with Kim Bum-soo, Ivy, Rumble Fish, Sunwoo, Sojung)	2015	Non-album singles
"Think of You" (생각나)	2017	Puppy Love (풋사랑) single album
"Springkle You" (좋아하나봄) (feat. NOV)	2017	Non-album single
"Deep Inside" (feat. Sojung)	2018	Deep Inside single album
"Starry Night"	2018	Non-album singles
"The Last" (그만)	2020	Non-album singles
"RainDrop"	2020	Non-album singles
"Room"	2020	Non-album singles
"Moving On" (아무 일 없듯이)	2021	Non-album singles
"If You Can" (만날까)	2021	Non-album singles
"Tuesday" (feat. Yoo Iseol)	2022	Non-album singles
"Dang" (feat. DeAndre, Greg Priester)	2022	Non-album singles
"Wake Up"	2023	Non-album singles
"Non Sweet Song" (달콤하지 않은 노래) (feat. NOV)	2023	Non-album singles
"Easy" (feat. Wynn)	2023	Non-album singles

=== Other charted songs ===
Title	Year	Peak chart positions	Sales	Album
Title	Year	KOR	Sales	Album
"Pass Me By" (지나간다)	2014	88	KOR: 19,071	K-pop Star 3 Battle Audition Part 1

== Filmography ==
=== Film ===
Year	Title	Role	Ref.
2007	West 32nd	Danny	
2015	Seoul Searching	Chow	
