= Catholic University of Korea St. Vincent's Hospital =

Geography
- Location: Suwon, South Korea
- Coordinates: 37.278335°N 127.027789°E

Services
- Beds: 900

Links
- Lists: Hospitals in South Korea

The Catholic University of Korea St. Vincent's Hospital (Korean: 가톨릭대학교 성빈센트병원) is a medical center in Suwon, South Korea. The number of beds is 900. Hospital is used in the 2010 TV series Master of Study.

== See also ==
- List of hospitals in South Korea
