= Two X =

South Korean girl group

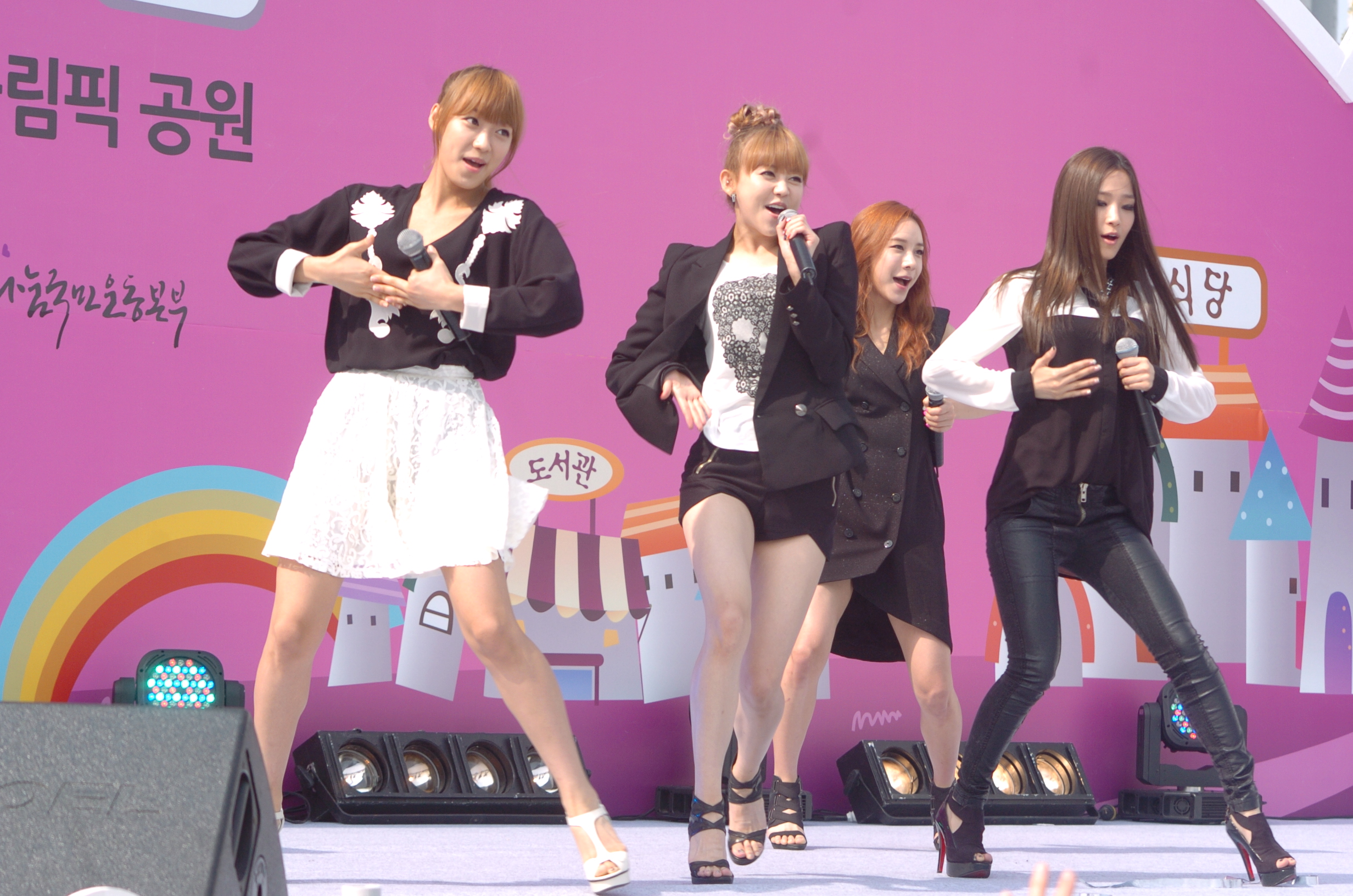

Background information
- Origin: South Korea
- Genres: Pop; dance; R&B
- Years active: 2012–2017
- Labels: J. Tune Camp; Star Gaze
- Past members: Jiu; Minjoo; Eun; Surin; Eunyoung

Two X (Korean: 투엑스) was a South Korean girl group from J. Tune Entertainment that debuted in 2012. The group's initial line-up consisted of five members: Jiu, Minjoo, Eun, Surin, and Eunyoung. The group released three singles: "Double Up" (2012), "Ring Ma Bell" (2013), and "Over" (2016) before disbanding.

== History ==
=== Debut and initial singles ===
On August 16, 2012, Two X made their stage debut on the music television program M Countdown and released their debut single "Double Up". This was followed shortly by their second single "Ring Ma Bell".

=== Hiatus and changes to label and line-up ===
In 2014, Two X ended their contract with J. Tune Camp and signed a record deal with Star Gaze Entertainment.

In January 2016, it was announced that key member Min-joo had left the group.

On August 23, 2016, the group released the song "Over" in promotion of their new EP, Reboot. It was their first release in three years and their first release as a four-member group.

During the later half of 2017, Two X ceased activities. On June 26, 2018, when a fan asked Eun on Instagram if Two X was disbanded, she confirmed the disbandment.

== Discography ==
=== Single albums ===
| Title | Album details | Peak chart positions | Sales |
| Title | Album details | KOR | Sales |
|---|---|---|---|
| Double Up | Released: August 16, 2012; Label: J. Tune Camp; Formats: CD, digital download | 22 | KOR: 962 |
| Ring Ma Bell | Released: February 12, 2013; Label: J. Tune Camp; Formats: CD, digital download | 13 | KOR: 2,092 |
| Reboot | Released: August 23, 2016; Label: Star Gaze Creative; Formats: CD, digital download | — | |
"—" denotes release did not chart.

=== Singles ===
| Title | Year | Peak chart positions | Sales (Digital) | Album |
| Title | Year | KOR | Sales (Digital) | Album |
|---|---|---|---|---|
| "Double Up" | 2012 | — | | Double Up |
| "Ring Ma Bell" | 2013 | 56 | KOR: 31,716 | Ring Ma Bell |
| "Over" (꽂혀) | 2016 | — | | Reboot |
"—" denotes release did not chart.
