= Singal-dong =

- Hangul: 신갈동
- Hanja: 新葛洞
- RR: Singal-dong
- MR: Sin'gal-tong

Singal-dong (Korean: 신갈동) is an area of Yongin, in Gyeonggi Province, South Korea. It is near two major expressways and a large reservoir by the same name. As such, it is a major junction for the surrounding area. In October 2026, Mayor Lee announced a major development.

== Transportation ==
Singal is also the name of a station currently under construction, on the extension of Seoul Metropolitan Subway's Bundang Line. Singal is also the name of the Singal Junction, that of the Gyeongbu and Yeongdong Expressways. The Suwon exit on the Gyeongbu Expressway (Exit 44), named because of its proximity to Suwon City Centre, is also in Singal. The area is a short drive from Bundang, Suwon and Yongin Centre.

== Attractions ==
Singal is close to the Korean Folk Village, the most visited such attraction in the country.
