= Ladies' Code =

South Korean girl group

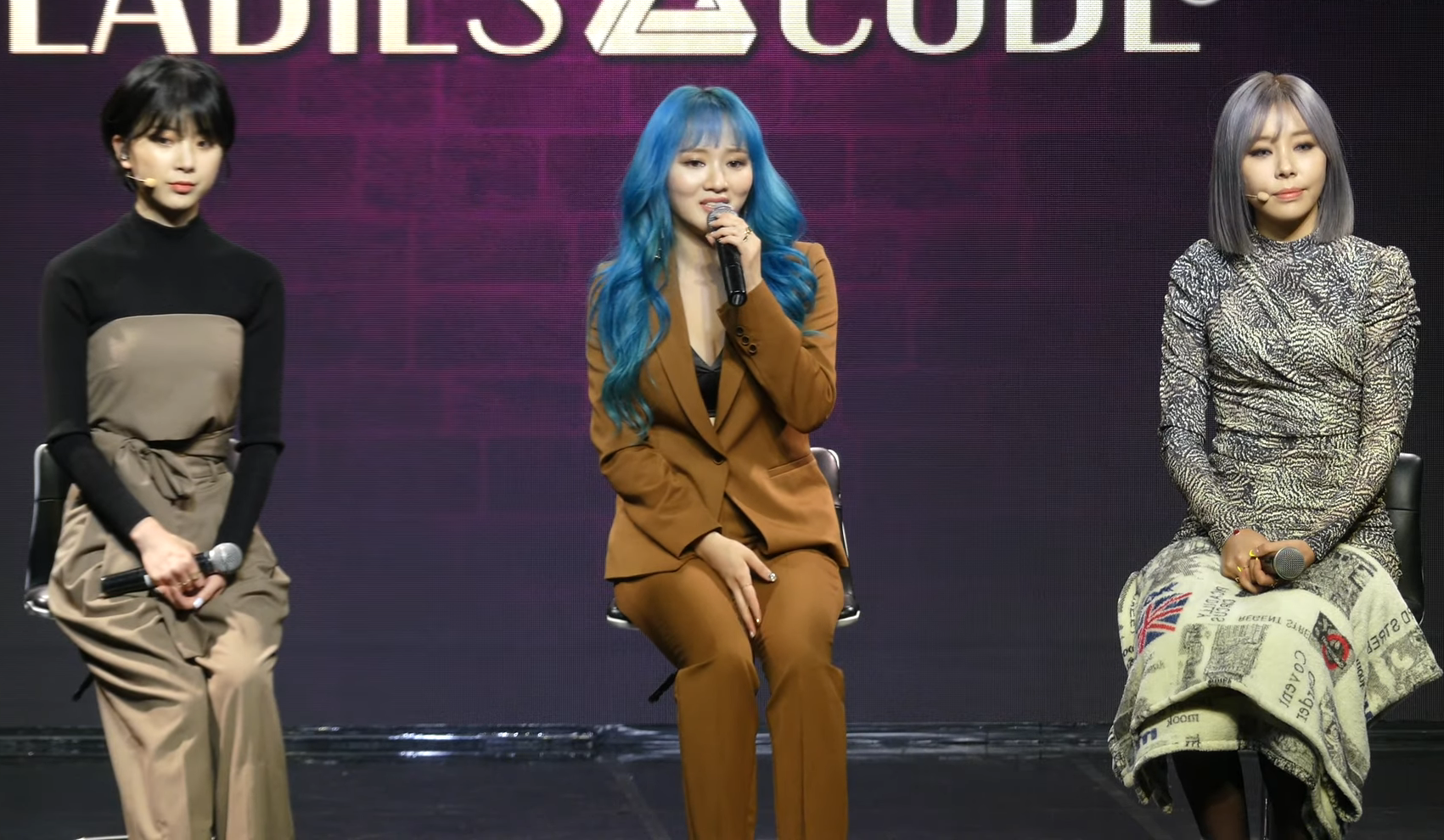
- Ladies' Code in October 2019; From left to right: Zuny, Sojung, and Ashley

Background information
- Origin: Seoul, South Korea
- Genres: K-pop; electropop; R&B
- Years active: 2013–2020 (Note: Indefinite hiatus)
- Label: Polaris
- Members: Ashley; Sojung; Zuny
- Past members: EunB; Rise

Ladies' Code (Korean: 레이디스 코드) is a South Korean girl group formed by Polaris Entertainment in 2013. The group's original lineup consisted of leader Ashley and members RiSe, EunB, Sojung, and Zuny. They made their debut with the mini-album Code#01 and the lead track "Bad Girl", which were released on March 7, 2013. On September 3, 2014, the group was involved in a car crash that resulted in the deaths of EunB and Rise. Ladies' Code returned as a trio in February 2016 with the extended play Myst3ry. In October 2016, they issued "The Rain" from their EP Strang3r. The group left Polaris in February 2020 following the expiration of their contracts. The group is currently on indefinite hiatus, with the members pursuing solo careers.

== History ==
=== Pre-debut ===
Before the establishment of the group, most of the members had some experience in the entertainment industry.

Rise participated in Miss Korea 2009 as a representative of Japan, and won the Korean Abroad Award. She gained popularity by starring in the talent show called Star Audition: The Great Birth, and finished in the Top 12. She then appeared with fellow Star Audition contestant David Oh as a couple on the reality show We Got Married in 2011. Rise later signed on with KeyEast before switching agencies in 2013.

EunB was previously a trainee under FNC Entertainment, where she was in the original line-up for AOA. However, she left the company prior to the group's debut because she felt she needed more experience as a trainee.

Sojung was a finalist and finished in the top eight of the first season of The Voice of Korea.

Ashley, prior to her debut, was known for uploading dance covers of K-pop songs to YouTube and for being a former trainee under Cube Entertainment. Zuny was mainly known for being a former trainee under BigHit Entertainment.

=== 2012–2013: Bad Girl and Pretty Pretty ===
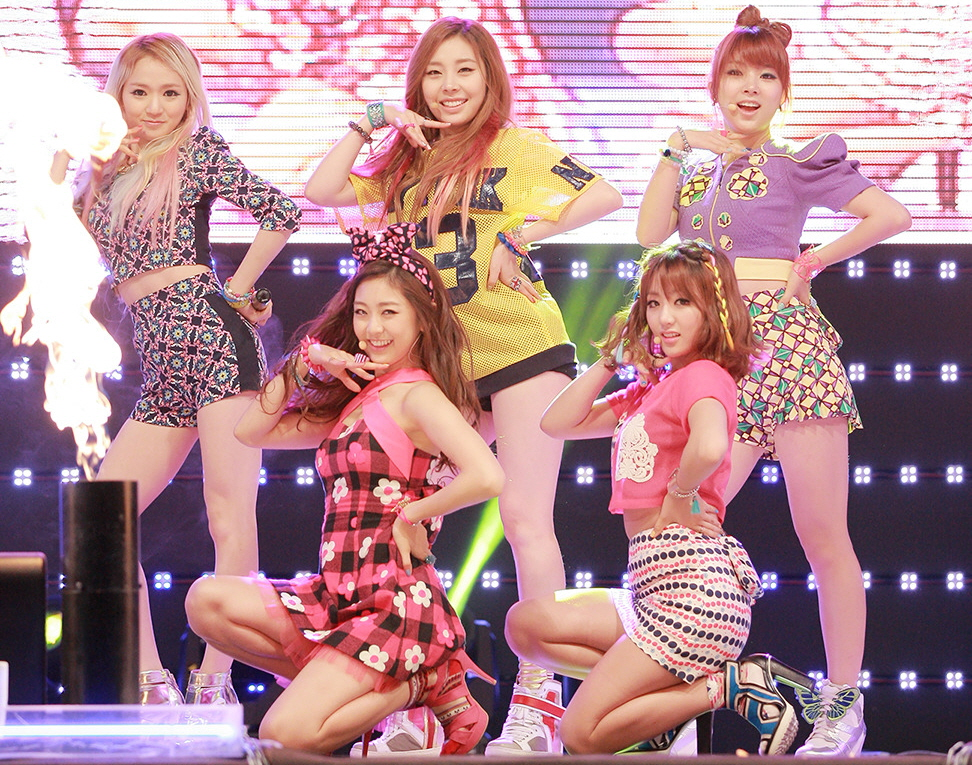
Ladies' Code in October 2013

In 2012, Ladies' Code started recording their debut album. On February 20, 2013, Sojung confirmed that she would join a new girl group being formed by Polaris Entertainment, and that they would debut in the following month. Promotion began on February 25, 2013, with the release of Rise's teaser video, followed by Sojung's on the 26th, EunB's on the 27th, for Zuny's on the 28th, and March 1 for leader Ashley respectively. On March 4, 2013, they released the group teaser for their music video.

The group's debut mini-album Code#01 along with the title song "Bad Girl" and accompanying music video was released on March 7, 2013. The day after their debut, their song charted well on the real-time music charts including Bugs, Soribada, Mnet and Daum, and eventually peaked at number 34 on the Gaon Digital Chart. They had their first live performance on M! Countdown the same day of the release with the group concluding promotions on Inkigayo on April 21, 2013.

Their first digital single "Hate You" was released on August 6, 2013, serving as a pre-release for their upcoming second mini-album. The group's return was originally set for July 25, 2013, however member Zuny had an unexpected leg injury which pushed back their comeback until August. The song debuted high on the real-time charts, achieving their first number-one single on Bugs Music and charting within the top 10 in four other music charts.

On August 21, 2013, Ladies' Code announced their comeback for their second mini-album, Code#02 Pretty Pretty, which was released on September 5, 2013.

=== 2014: "So Wonderful" and "Kiss Kiss" ===
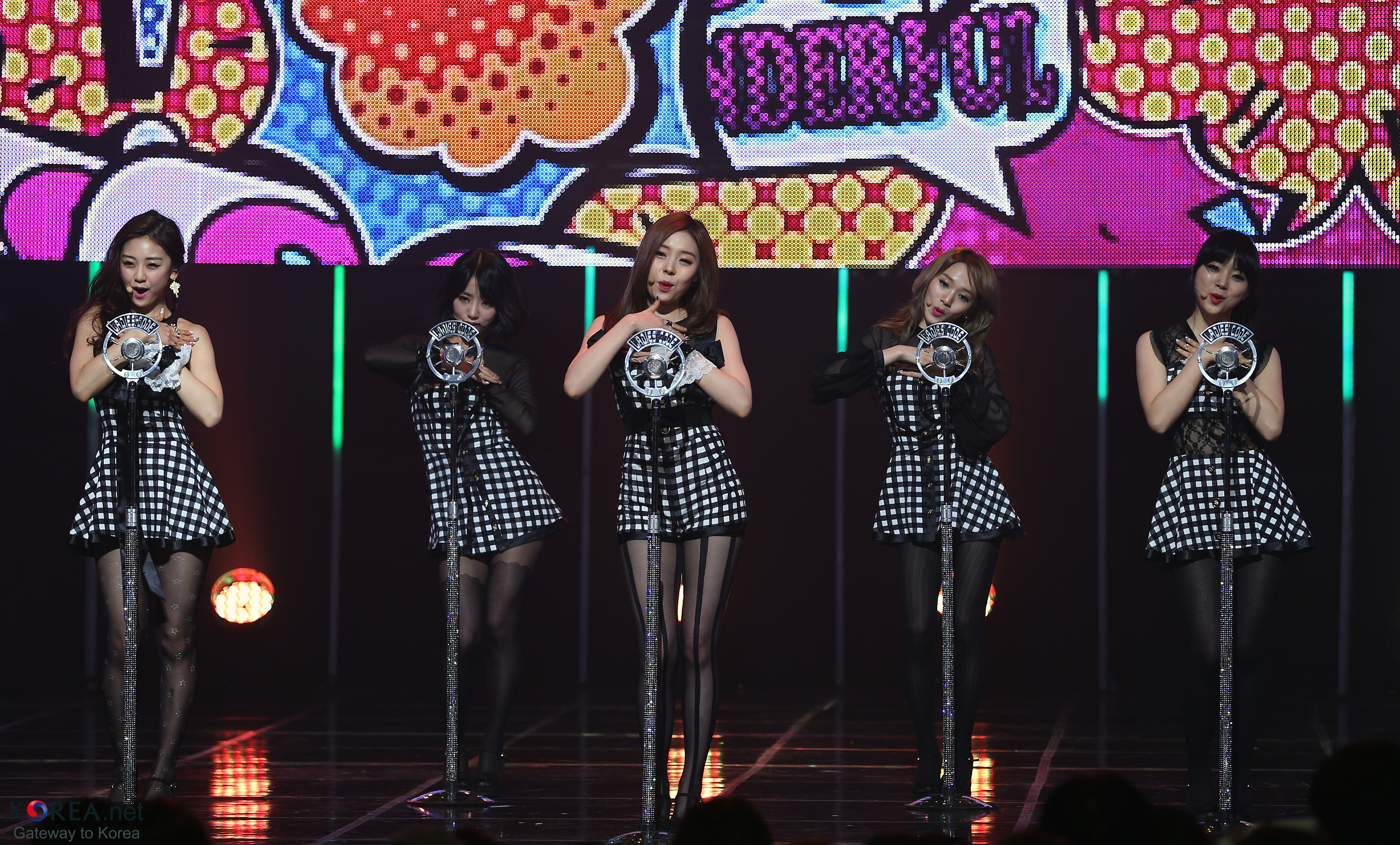
Ladies' Code performing "So Wonderful" on M! Countdown in March 2014.

Polaris Entertainment announced on February 4, 2014, that the group would make a comeback with their second digital single "So Wonderful." A still-cut of the first music video teaser was released on February 6, 2014, showing member Kwon Rise lying in transparent plastic wrap. The teaser was subsequently released online the following day with the second teaser on February 10. The song was produced by Super Changddai who worked with the group since their debut. The single along with its accompanying music video was released on February 13, 2014, with the group performing the song for the first time on M! Countdown the same day.

On July 31, 2014, Ladies' Code revealed a teaser image of their new single "Kiss Kiss" and released a video teaser the following day. A second video teaser featuring all of the members recreating kiss scenes such as the fairy tale "The Frog Prince" was released on August 5, 2014. On August 6, 2014, the music video for "Kiss Kiss" and the single were released on August 7, 2014. A limited edition CD single for "Kiss Kiss" was also released. The group began promotions for the song on KBS's Music Bank the following day.

On September 1, 2014, Ashley revealed that the group was in the midst of working on a new album, though whether it was a mini-album or full-length album is unknown. This would eventually be the last announcement made by the group with all 5 members.

==== Fatal car crash ====
On September 3, 2014, at around 1:30 am (KST), the group was involved in a serious car collision while returning to Seoul after attending the recording of KBS "Open Concert" at DGIST. The group's manager, Mr. Park, was driving the van (a Hyundai Starex) and had been speeding, driving 137 km/h (85 mph) in a 100 km/h (62 mph) zone for a distance of 30 km (19 miles). Rainy conditions made the road slippery, which caused Park to suddenly lose control of the vehicle, causing the group's van to hydroplane and skid several times before crashing into a protective wall in the vicinity of the Singal Junction on Yeongdong Expressway.

EunB was declared dead on arrival by the time the paramedics reached Sungbin Medical Center, while the remaining six passengers were rushed to various hospitals. Sojung and Rise, who suffered the most serious injuries, were taken to the Catholic University of Korea St. Vincent's Hospital in Suwon, listed under critical condition. Rise's condition quickly deteriorated and she was moved to Ajou University Hospital, where she eventually died four days later on September 7, 2014, at 10:10 am (KST). Sojung's condition was stabilized. Ashley, Zuny, Park, and one stylist also sustained minor injuries. On October 29, Ashley and Zuny were released from the hospital and spent time recovering at their respective homes, while Sojung was moved to a hospital in her hometown of Wonju. They returned to their group's dorm in Seoul on November 12, with Sojung continuing to receive outpatient treatment.

The investigation conducted by the National Institute of Scientific Investigation (NISI) revealed and confirmed that the cause of the collision was due to driving over the posted speed limit and that the van's back tire came off due to the impact of the van crashing into the protective wall. It had been reported that none of the van's airbags deployed at the time of impact, while witness accounts state that the vehicle rolled over multiple times after it hit the protective wall. An ambulance worker who was at the scene later reported that he did "not recall undoing any seat belts" as he attempted to help the injured passengers.

In the wake of EunB and Rise's deaths, the group would go on to achieve major success on the music charts as fans of the group began posting messages on online communities and SNS encouraging people to listen to the song "I'm Fine Thank You" (from the group's second EP Pretty Pretty) as a tribute and to fulfill EunB's dream of ranking first on the music charts. The song would eventually top several real-time music charts including Melon, Bugs, Genie, Monkey3, and Olleh, also peaking at number three on the Gaon Singles Chart, making it their highest-charting single. Both "I'm Fine Thank You" and "Kiss Kiss" would also go on to debut at number six and number 21 on the Billboard World Digital Songs chart, marking the group's first two entries on the chart.

The group's final performance with all five members aired on KBS on September 15, 2014, bookended with a tribute to EunB and Rise. On September 15, 2014, Polaris Entertainment released a tribute music video of "I'm Fine Thank You", using behind-the-scenes footage of the group to honor EunB and Rise.

On November 12, 2014, Park was arrested and indicted on the charge of causing a fatal collision under the Act on Special Cases Concerning the Settlement of Traffic Accidents and was sentenced to a year and two months in jail on January 15, 2015. On March 25, 2015, Park filed an appeal to reduce his sentence. On April 8, 2015, he reached a settlement agreement with both EunB and Rise's families for an undisclosed amount. On April 15, 2015, Park's appeal was successful, and his sentence was reduced to a suspended one year and two months jail sentence for a period of two years. He was also required to do 160 hours of community service and attend 40 hours of law-abiding driving classes.

On April 26, 2015, it was reported that Zuny, Ashley, and Sojung had resumed their practice schedule while continuing to receive counseling and follow-up treatments for injuries sustained from the crash.

=== 2015–2016: Return as trio, Myst3ry and Strang3r ===
Ladies' Code held a memorial concert named "I'm Fine Thank You: Rise & EunB Memorial Concert" on August 22, 2015, at the Shinagawa Stellar-ball in Tokyo, Japan, in honor of Rise's dream that Ladies' Code would someday perform in her home country. The concert featured Polaris artists, including Kim Bum-soo and Rumble Fish, and a performance of "I'll Smile Even If It Hurts" by Ashley, Sojung, and Zuny. Sojung was involved in the track's composition and production.

On September 3, 2015, Sojung and Polaris artists Kim Bum-soo, IVY, Han Hee-jun, Rumble Fish, and Sun Woo released a cover of "I'm Fine, Thank You" in memory of EunB and Rise. A Polaris representative stated that all proceeds from the song would be donated to charity. Ladies' Code members released "I'll Smile Even If It Hurts" as digital single on September 7, 2015, the first anniversary of Rise's death.

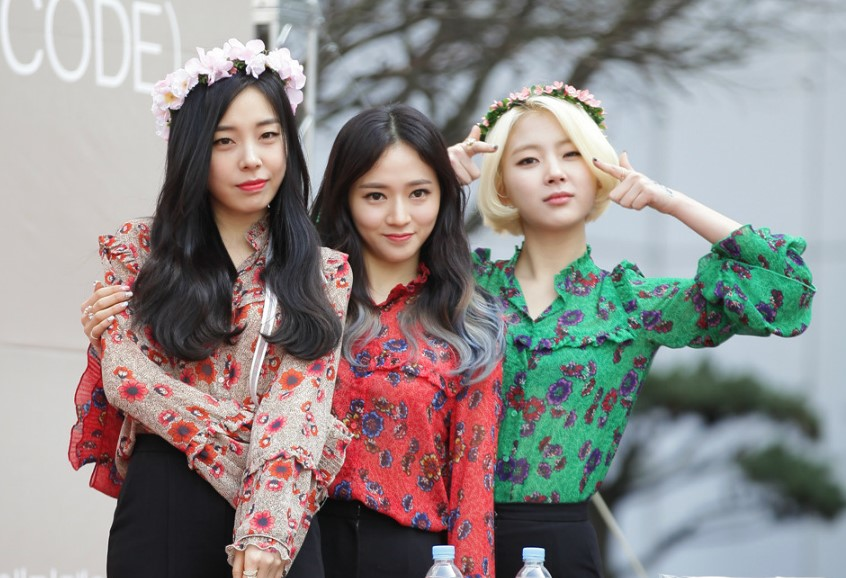
Ladies' Code at a fan event in Shinsegae on March 19, 2016.

On January 23, 2016, Ladies' Code was revealed to be preparing for a comeback in the spring, their first comeback since the crash and as a trio. Polaris Entertainment noted the end of February as a tentative comeback date and clarified that there were no future plans to recruit new members. The album named Myst3ry with its title track "Galaxy" was released on February 24, 2016.

On October 13, 2016, Ladies' Code released their single album Strang3r along with the title track "The Rain".

=== 2017–present: Solo activities, "The Last Holiday", Code#3 Set Me Free, and hiatus ===
On May 4, 2017, Sojung released a solo song named "Better than Me", and later released another solo single, "Stay Here" on March 8, 2018.

Ashley made her solo debut on July 17, 2018, with the single "Here We Are".

On December 12, 2018, the group released a Christmas single "The Last Holiday", making it their first release in two years as a group.

In May 2019, Ladies' Code released a single titled "Feedback".

On October 10, 2019, Ladies' Code released their fourth album Code#03 Set Me Free, their third from the "Code" series. This album was released six years after Code#02 Pretty Pretty. The lead single for their fourth album is called "Set Me Free", and was written by 1Take and TAK.

On February 17, 2020, Ladies' Code left Polaris Entertainment following the expiration of their contracts with the label. The group is currently on indefinite hiatus, with the members pursuing solo careers.

== Endorsements ==
Ladies' Code signed their first deal with Pepsi Korea in August 2013 as the company's next models for their 'Open Your Pepsi Now' campaign. In January 2014, the group teamed up with Nexon to promote the winter update for the MMORPG Mabinogi Heroes.

== Artistry ==
=== Musical style ===
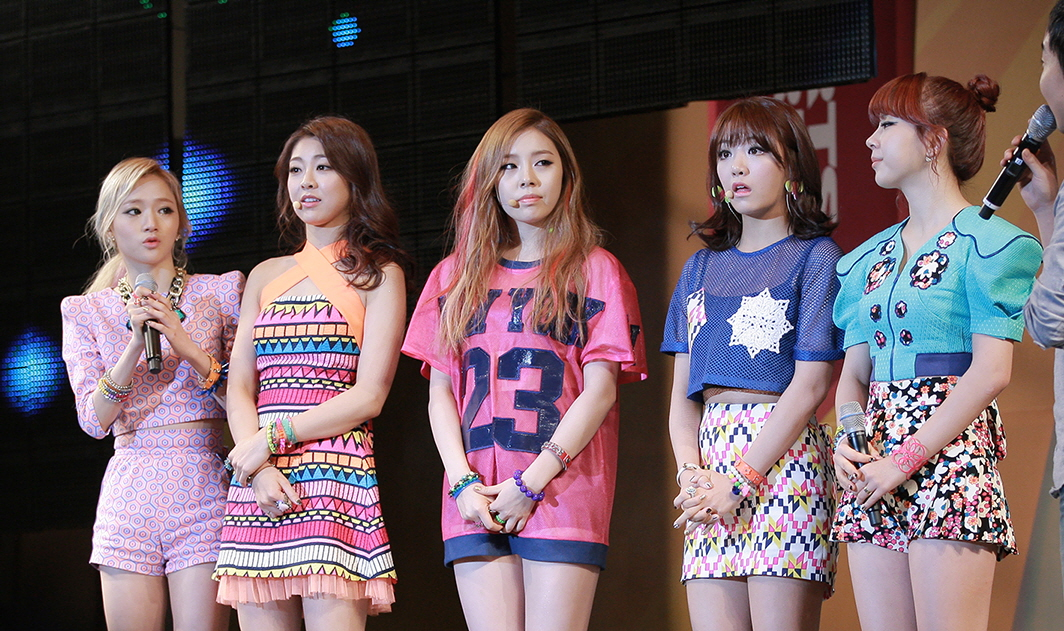
Ladies' Code in 2013. From left to right: Sojung, RiSe, Ashley, EunB and Zuny.

Prior to the crash, Ladies' Code's music had been predominantly pop with a retro sound. Billboard magazine noted that the group blends in "modern electro-pop" with "classic throwback elements" and powerful vocals. The group's debut single "Bad Girl" was described as a swing/jazz-inspired track accompanied with solid vocals. Their follow-up single, "Hate You" was marked as a departure, returning with a mid-tempo dance song with a combination of brass and acoustic guitar arrangements.

Subsequent releases retain their earlier style with Corynn Smith of MTV Iggy explaining their second extended play's title track "Pretty Pretty" as another example of the group's "rich retro sound", moving from 40s swing to a mixture of 70s and 80s beats. In an interview with enews on their digital single "So Wonderful", member Ashley explained the song was a continuation of their previous releases but added that they had incorporated the use of more instruments and were going for a "retro feeling from the 80's."

Their first release after the crash, Myst3ry, shifted into an R&B sound with the lead single "Galaxy" described as a "mid-tempo song that invokes a gloomy and dreamlike mood".

=== Influences ===
Ladies' Code have cited the Brown Eyed Girls and Wonder Girls as their role models, the latter compared to the group by media outlets due to their similar style of music and image. In September 2013, Wonder Girls' member Sunye posted a message on Twitter supporting the group, saying how "Pretty Pretty" reminded her on their group's past releases "Tell Me" and "So Hot".

== Members ==
=== Current ===
- Ashley (애슐리) – leader, vocalist
- Sojung (소정) – vocalist
- Zuny (주니) – vocalist

=== Former ===
- Rise (리세) – vocalist
- EunB (은비) – vocalist

== Discography ==
- Code#01 Bad Girl (2013)
- Code#02 Pretty Pretty (2013)
- Strang3r (2016)
- Code#03 Set Me Free (2019)

== Filmography ==
=== Reality shows ===
Year	Title
2013	The Reality of Ladies' Code

== Awards and nominations ==
=== Melon Music Awards ===
Year	Award	Result	Ref.
2013	Newcomer Award	Nominated	
2014	MBC Music Star Award	Won	

=== Mnet Asian Music Awards ===
Year	Category	Result	Ref.
2013	Best New Female Artist	Nominated	

=== Gaon Chart K-Pop Awards ===
Year	Category	Result	Ref.
2013	New Artist of the Year	Won	

=== Seoul International Youth Film Festival ===
Year	Category	Result	Ref.
2014	Best OST by a Female Artist ("Make Me Go Crazy")	Nominated	

=== Korea Entertainment Culture Awards ===
Year	Category	Result
2019	K-pop Singer Award	Won
