= Mind U =

South Korean band

- Also known as: Acourve
- Origin: Seoul, South Korea
- Genres: Ballad; R&B; Indie folk
- Years active: 2013–present
- Labels: Starship; Bridge Media
- Members: Jaehee; Godak

Mind U (Korean: 마인드유, formerly known as Acourve (어쿠루브)) is a South Korean duo formed by Bridge Media in 2013. They debuted on October 25, 2013, with "What I Want To Say", then later re-debuted under Starship Entertainment on April 27, 2017, with "Loved U". The duo departed from Starship on May 26, 2022.

== Members ==
- Jaehee (재희) — Vocalist
- Godak (고닥) — Producer

== Discography ==
=== Studio albums ===
Title	Album details	Peak chart positions	Sales
Title	Album details	KOR	Sales
Acourve
First Step	Released: January 13, 2016; Label: Bridge Media, LOEN Entertainment; Formats: CD, digital download	39	KOR: 548

=== Extended plays ===
Title	Album details	Peak chart positions	Sales
Title	Album details	KOR	Sales
Mind U
Dear	Released: November 3, 2017; Label: Starship Entertainment, LOEN Entertainment; Formats: CD, digital download	35	KOR: 781

=== Singles ===
Title	Year	Peak chart positions	Sales (DL)	Album
Title	Year	KOR	Sales (DL)	Album
Acourve
"What I Want To Say" (하고 싶은 말)	2013	—	—	First Step
"The Lovely Song When We Parted" (사랑노래 같은 이별노래)	2014	94	KOR: 21,720	First Step
"Never Got Your One"	2014	—	—	First Step
"C.C (Campus Couple)"	2014	—	—	First Step
"What Was That" (그게 뭐라고)	2014	—	—	First Step
"I Didn't Get You" (잡지 않았어)	2014	—	—	First Step
"Love War" (몰라 너 싫어)	2014	—	KOR: 14,261	First Step
"After You've Gone" (너가 떠나고)	2015	—	—	First Step
"Spring Is Here" (봄이 와)	2015	—	—	First Step
"Confession" (고백)	2015	—	—	First Step
"Rainy"	2015	—	KOR: 18,326	First Step
"Want to Tell You I Love You" (사랑한다 말할래)	2015	—	—	First Step
"Should Our Paths Cross Again" (우연이라도)	2016	95	KOR: 35,949	First Step
"The Day" (그날)	2016	—	KOR: 18,699	Non-album singles
"If You Love Me"	2016	—	—	Non-album singles
"Wait A Minute" (잠깐만요)	2016	69	KOR: 46,448	Non-album singles
"I Want To Go To You" (너에게 가고싶어)	2017	—	—	Love Diary
Mind U
"Loved U" (좋아했나봐) feat. Mad Clown	2017	—	—	Non-album single
"Love Me" (사랑해줘요)	2017	—	—	Dear
"If" (만약에)	2017	—	—	Dear
"—" denotes releases that did not chart.

=== Soundtrack appearances ===
Year	Title	Album
2015	"Honey"	A Girl Who Sees Smells OST
2018	"I'll Come In"	Welcome to Waikiki OST
