= Code 01 Bad Girl =

Code#01 Bad Girl

EP by Ladies' Code
- Released: March 7, 2013
- Recorded: 2012–2013
- Genres: K-pop; dance; ballad
- Length: 14:32
- Language: Korean
- Labels: Polaris; CJ E&M

Ladies' Code chronology
Code#01 Bad Girl (2013)	Code#02 Pretty Pretty (2013)

Singles from Code #01 Bad Girl
- 1. "Bad Girl" Released: March 7, 2013

Code#01 Bad Girl (Korean: Code#01 나쁜여자) is the debut extended play by South Korean girl group Ladies' Code. It was released on March 7, 2013 through Polaris Entertainment and CJ E&M Music. Its lead single "Bad Girl" was released the same day.

== Track listing ==
No.	Title	Lyrics	Music	Arrangement	Length
1.	"Intro... Bad Girl"				0:34
2.	"Bad Girl" (나쁜여자; Nappeun Yeoja)	Super Changddai	Super Changddai	Super Changddai	3:17
3.	"Super Girl"	Kim Eun-su	Crada		3:11
4.	"Dada La"	Kim Eun-su	E. One	E. One	3:36
5.	"I Won't Cry" (안울래; An Ullae)	Super Changddai & Hong Ji-sang	Super Changddai & Hong Ji-sang	Super Changddai & Hong Ji-sang	3:54
Total length:					14:32

== Charts ==
Country	Chart	Peak position
South Korea (Gaon)	Weekly Albums Chart	23
South Korea (Gaon)	Monthly Albums Chart	60
South Korea (Gaon)	Yearly Albums Chart	—

== Sales and certifications ==
Chart	Amount
Gaon physical sales	1,372+

== Release history ==
Region	Date	Format	Label	Catalog
South Korea	March 7, 2013	CD; digital download	Polaris; CJ E&M	CMCC-10068
