= Polaris Entertainment =

South Korean record label

Polaris
- Trade name: Polaris Entertainment
- Native name: 폴라리스 엔터테인먼트
- Type: Private
- Industry: Music; Entertainment
- Genre: K-pop; Pop; Dance; R&B; Ballad; Rap; Hip hop
- Founded: August 21, 2006
- Founder: Lee Jong-Myung
- Headquarters: Samseong-dong, Seongbuk District, Seoul, South Korea
- Parent: Ilgwang Group(2006-2018); Levite United (2018-Present)
- Subsidiaries: Polaris Mnet (50%) (Note: Joint venture with CJ E&M, in charge of Mnet Academy); Blockberry Creative (defunct); NEWTYPE ENT
- Website: www.polarisent.co.kr

Polaris (Korean: (주)일광폴라리스; Polaris Entertainment), previously known as Ilgwang Polaris, was a South Korean record label founded in 2006. It was formerly a subsidiary of Ilgwang Group, a large South Korean conglomerate whose main business is arms trade, and is now a subsidiary of Levite United, founded by CEO and Ilgwang Group founder Lee Kyu-tae's son Lee Jong-myung.

== History ==
Polaris Entertainment was founded on August 21, 2006. At its founding, it was the subsidiary of Ilgwang Group, a corporation primarily dealing with arms trade. In their early years, the label managed notable artists such as Kim Bum-soo and Ivy and actors such as Oh Yoon-ah and Jung Joon.

In March 2013, the girl group Ladies' Code debuted under Polaris, and in doing so became the first girl group under the record label. The group was successful in its early years, having been a nominee for multiple awards, however, one year later, a car crash on September 3, 2014, caused the death of two members of the group. The group would then return in 2016 for the release of a new EP.

In late 2018, it was confirmed that the company had signed former Wonder Girls member, Sunye following her 5 year hiatus.

In 2019, the company revealed plans to debut a new six member boy group known as Tripleme, revealing each member officially as well as promoting the group on their YouTube channel. However, the group ceased activity after November 2020, without officially debuting.

In spring of 2022, Polaris's website officially shut down, following the departure of all musical artists within the company. The company is still active.

== Former Artists ==
- Kim Wan-sun
- Choi Moo-sung
- Jae Hee
- Jeong Ho-bin
- Ji Dae-han
- Jung Joon
- Lee Eun-woo
- Lee Kyun
- Kim Joon-bae
- Kim Se-ah
- Kim Tae-han
- Oh Yoon-ah
- Park Jung-chul
- Shin Min-cheol
- Sunwoo Jae-duk
- Yang Dong-geun
- Kim Tae-woo (2006–2011)
- Clara Lee (2006–2014)
- Chae Dong-ha (2007–2009)
- Kim Bum-soo (2008–2018)
- Dia (2010–2012)
- Hwang Ji-hyun (???–2012)
- Ivy (2012–2019)
- Ladies' Code (2013–2020) (Note: Member EunB died when the group's vehicle was in a traffic collision on September 3, 2014, while RiSe died of her injuries on September 7. The remaining group members left the label on February 17, 2020.)
- Han Hee-jun (2013–2022)
- Rumble Fish (2014–2016)
- Iron (2015)
- Ryu Hwa-young (2020–2021)
- Sunye (2018–2022)
- Lee Woo Jong
- Choi Si Hun
- Choi Jae Won
- Kim Kang Jin
- Yoo Hyun Seok
- Jung Ho Bin
- Lee Ji An
- Nam So Ok

=== Former actors ===
- Kim Bo Jung
- Oh Yoon Ah
- Lena Jae Eun Chung
- Jung Yun Jae
