= Myname discography =

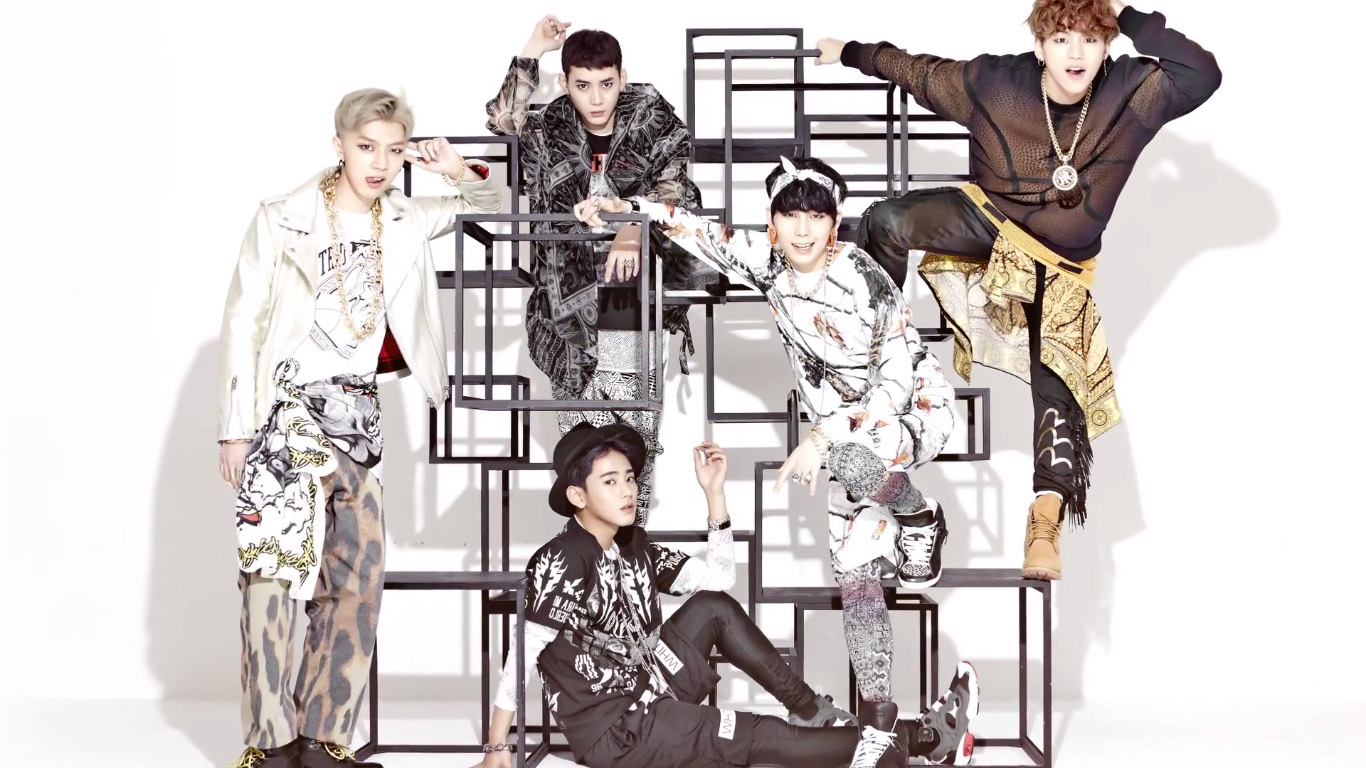
- Studio albums: 5
- EPs: 4
- Compilation albums: 1
- Singles: 19
- Video albums: 2
- Single albums: 4

The discography of Myname, a South Korean idol group, consists of six studio albums, one compilation album, four mini-albums, four single albums, 19 singles, and two video albums released in South Korea and Japan.

== Albums ==
=== Studio albums ===
Title	Album details	Peak chart positions		Sales
Title	Album details	JPN Oricon	JPN Billboard (Note: Week references for Billboard Japan Hot Albums: Alive: Always in Your Heart, Myname Is,Kiseki.)	Sales
Japanese
We Are Myname	Released: March 27, 2013; Label: Yoshimoto R and C; Format: CD, digital download	3	—	JPN: 37,240
Five Stars	Released: March 26, 2014; Label: Yoshimoto R and C; Format: CD, digital download	5	—	JPN: 36,154
I.M.G.: Without You	Released: March 10, 2015; Label: Yoshimoto R and C; Format: CD, digital download	2	—	JPN: 57,649
Alive: Always in Your Heart	Released: December 7, 2016; Label: Virgin Records; Format: CD, digital download	2	2	JPN: 33,118
Myname Is	Released: July 19, 2017; Label: Virgin Records; Format: CD, digital download	4	5	JPN: 29,000
Kiseki	Released: July 25, 2018; Label: Virgin Records; Format: CD, digital download	3	7	JPN: 18,689

=== Compilation albums ===
Title	Album details	Peak chart positions	Sales
Title	Album details	JPN	Sales
Japanese
Mybestname!	Released: November 4, 2015; Label: Yoshimoto R and C; Format: CD, digital download	2	JPN: 42,991

=== Single albums ===
Title	Album details	Peak chart positions	Sales
Title	Album details	KOR (Note: Week references for Gaon Album Chart: Myname 1st Mini Album, Myname 2nd Mini Album, Myname 1st Single, Myname 2nd Single, Myname 3rd Single, Myname 4th Single.)	Sales
Korean
Myname 1st Single	Released: June 1, 2012; Label: H2 Media; Format: CD, digital download	7	KOR: 9,029
Myname 2nd Single	Released: January 25, 2013; Label: H2 Media; Format: CD, digital download	4	KOR: 14,576
Myname 3rd Single Album	Released: October 11, 2013; Label: H2 Media; Format: CD, digital download	8	KOR: 11,312
Myname 4th Single	Released: May 13, 2015; Label: H2 Media; Format: CD, digital download	6	KOR: 9,893

== Extended plays ==
Title	EP details	Peak chart positions		Sales
Title	EP details	KOR	JPN	Sales
Korean
Myname 1st Mini Album	Released: July 4, 2013; Label: H2 Media; Format: CD, digital download	1	—	KOR: 35,490
Myname 2nd Mini Album	Released: February 12, 2015; Label: H2 Media; Format: CD, digital download	3	144	KOR: 4,569; JPN: 504
Japanese
Vivid	Released: July 2, 2025; Label: Tokuma Japan Communications; Format: CD, digital download	—	9	JPN: 6,786
Re:Blue	Released: April 29, 2026; Label: Irving Co.; Format: CD, digital download	—	9	JPN: 4,276

== Singles ==
Title	Year	Peak chart positions			Sales	Release
Title	Year	KOR (Note: Week references for Gaon Digital Chart: "Message", "Hello & Goodbye", "Just That Little Thing", "Baby I'm Sorry", "Day by Day",)	JPN Oricon	JPN Billboard (Note: Week references for Billboard Japan Hot 100: "What's Up", "Shirayuki", "Hello Again", "Deai Aishite".)	Sales	Release
Korean
"Message" (메시지; Mesiji)	2011	128	—	—	KOR: 98,348 (Note: Accumulation of sales: 24,942, 57,107, 16,299.)	Non-album single
"Hello & Goodbye"	2012	107	—	—	KOR: 62,504 (Note: Accumulation of sales: 29,925, 32,579,)	Myname 1st Single
"Just That Little Thing" (그까짓거; Geuggajitgeo)	2013	85	—	—	KOR: 42,595 (Note: Accumulation of sales: 20,851, 21,744.)	Myname 2nd Single
"Baby I’m Sorry"	2013	49	—	—	KOR: 81,442	Myname 1st Mini Album
"Day by Day"	2013	113	—	—	KOR: 38,085 (Note: Accumulation of sales: 18,725, 19,360.)	Myname 3rd Single
"Too Very So Much"	2015	—	—	—		Myname 2nd Mini Album
"Just Tell Me"	2015	—	—	—	KOR: 6,629	Myname 4th Single
Japanese
"Message (Japanese ver.)"	2012	—	14	—	JPN: 17,630	We Are Myname
"What's Up"	2012	—	9	85	JPN: 22,741	We Are Myname
"Replay (Japanese ver.)"	2012	—	—	—		We Are Myname
"We Are the Night"	2012	—	—	—		We Are Myname
"Shirayuki"	2013	—	7	98	JPN: 28,200	Five Stars
"F.F.Y"	2014	—	—	—		Five Stars
"Your Answer"	2014	—	—	—		Five Stars
"Stop the Time"	2015	—	—	—		I.M.G.: Without You
"Hello Again"	2015	—	3	29	JPN: 45,929	Mybestname!
"Alive or Fallen"	2016	—	—	—		Alive: Always in Your Heart
"Deai Aishite" (出会いあいして; "Meeting You")	2017	—	3	5	JPN: 28,422	Myname Is
"Baby Tonight"	2017	—	—	—		Myname Is
"Wiz"	2018	—	—	—		Kiseki
"We Are the One"	2025	—	—	—		Non-album single
"Bad Bad Higher"	2025	—	—	—		Vivid
"Time's Up"	2026	—	—	—		Re:Blue

== Video albums ==
Title	Album details	Peak chart positions	Sales
Title	Album details	JPN DVD	Sales
Japanese
Myname no W Kitchen (MYNAMEのWキッチン, Myname's Kitchen)	Released: July 31, 2013; Label: Yoshimoto R and C; Format: DVD	87	
Myname Live Tour 2013: The Departure Live DVD	Released: December 11, 2013; Label: Yoshimoto R and C; Format: DVD	119	

== Soundtrack appearances ==
List of soundtrack songs, with performers, showing year released and soundtrack name
Title	Year	Performer	Soundtrack
"Take Me to the Moon"	2014	Myname	Taekwondo Damashii: Rebirth
"Dino Force Brave"	2017	Se-yong	Power Rangers Dino Force Brave
