= Tokyo Lady =

Single by Iconiq

from the album Light Ahead
- Released: August 11, 2010
- Genre: J-pop; electronic rock
- Length: 5:17
- Label: Rhythm Zone
- Songwriters: NaNa Music, Uta

Iconiq singles chronology
"Bye Now!" (2010)	"Tokyo Lady" (2010)

"Tokyo Lady" (stylized as TOKYO LADY) is a song recorded by South Korean singer Iconiq for her first Japanese extended play, Light Ahead. It was released as a promotional single from the EP on August 11, 2010 through Rhythm Zone. The single was originally planned for a July 28 release, however was postponed.

== Writing ==
The song is an electro/rock-styled pop song, written by NaNa Music and Uta, the writers of "Crystal Girl" and "LoveShineMagic" from Iconiq's debut album Change Myself. The lyrics of the song continue on with the same themes as Iconiq's Change Myself songs do, speaking of new beginnings, bright futures and references to objects in everyday life. The scene in "Tokyo Lady" is of a woman after a break up of a relationship, who has already begun the process of moving on. As she walks forward, "the world changes." References are made to the song's protagonist going to a social event, as she "paints the town" while wearing pink high heels, and faces her favorite place while throwing hey car key into her bag.

According to the official site's liner notes, the song is about the "dazzling determination of a woman starting to walk forward to her future," in a metropolitan Tokyo setting. To Iconiq, the song represents the Tokyo aspects to her new start as a musician in Japan, and considers it a message song to encourage women.

== Promotion ==
Iconiq in the commercial for Shiseido's Maquillage range.

The song was first unveiled at Iconiq's debut live, at Shibuya-AX on May 16, where it was performed and announced as her first single. The song was marketed as a "three tie-up single," with commercials for three companies airing simultaneously: Shiseido's Maquillage cosmetic range, Morinaga's Weider and Jelly sports drink/A-Nation 2010, and Rechochoku. These began airing on July 21, 2010. The song was performed at A-Nation in early August, 2010, at which Iconiq had a special booth filled with promotional goods for purchase.

This was the fourth successive time an Iconiq song has been used in commercials for both Shisedo and Recochoku, after "I'm Lovin' You," "Change Myself" and "Bye Now!." The Shiseido commercial, dubbed the Kyakkō no Tsuya-hen (脚光のツヤ篇, Limelight Gloss Version) of the commercial at the Shisedo Maquillage website, featured Iconiq with a longer pixie cut hairstyle, as opposed to her regular "baby short cut" of her debut album. The commercial for Weider and Jelly/A-Nation, however, showed Iconiq with her previous hairstyle.

The single was promoted as a "one coin single," due to its price of 500 yen. It was also marketed for having three differently designed back covers, that featured a different, wider-angled view of Iconiq from the photoshoot for the single's cover. During single promotions, special billboards were placed at several major Tokyo train stations, on which pairs of fishnet stockings were affixed for the general public to take.

Iconiq performed this song as a per of her set at the 2010 A-Nation concerts.

== Music video ==
Iconiq in the music video.

The music video was directed by Diane Martel, and filmed simultaneously in Los Angeles along with the two other music videos for songs on Light Ahead, "Light Ahead" and "Kiss & Cry." The video depicts Iconiq posing in a range of fashion-oriented outfits, against a background of colorful geometric shapes and pop art inspired designs, often with static shots of Iconiq repeated on the screen in multiple places.

== Track listing ==
No.	Title	Writer(s)	Length
1.	"Tokyo Lady"	NaNa Music, Uta	5:17
2.	"Tokyo Lady (Instrumental)"	NaNa Music, Uta	5:16
Total length:			10:33

== Chart rankings ==
"Tokyo Lady"
A sample from the chorus of "Tokyo Lady."

Chart	Peak position
Billboard Adult Contemporary Airplay	28
Billboard Japan Hot 100	21
Oricon daily singles	15
Oricon weekly singles	19

=== Reported sales ===
Chart	Amount
Oricon physical sales	10,000

== Release history ==
Region	Date	Format
Japan	July 28, 2010	Ringtone
Japan	August 11, 2010	CD, rental CD
Taiwan	August 13, 2010	CD
Hong Kong	August 21, 2010	CD
Japan	September 15, 2010	PC download, cellphone download
