= Change Myself (disambiguation) =

Change Myself is a 2010 Japanese album by Iconiq.

Change Myself may also refer to:

== Music ==
- "Change Myself" (song), 2010 promotional song for cosmetics commercial by Iconiq
- "Change Myself", 1991 single by Todd Rundgren from the album 2nd Wind
