= Shirayuki =

Shirayuki may refer to:

- Shirayuki (train), a train service in Japan
- "Shirayuki" (song), a 2013 song by Myname
- Berry Shirayuki, character in Tokyo Mew Mew
- Japanese destroyer Shirayuki
