= Bye Now! =

Single by Iconiq

from the album Change Myself
- Released: March 10, 2010
- Genre: J-pop; Synthpop; R&B
- Length: 3:38
- Label: Rhythm Zone
- Songwriters: Michico, T. Kura
- Producers: Michico, T. Kura

Iconiq singles chronology
"Change Myself" (2010)	"Bye Now!" (2010)	"Tokyo Lady" (2010)

"Bye Now!" (stylised as BYE NOW!) is a song recorded by Japanese born-South Korean singer Iconiq, marketed as the lead single of her debut Studio album, Change Myself, released in March 2010.

It was widely played at radio stations during the album's release, peaking at #8 on the Billboard Japan Hot 100. The song was also included on her extended play Light Ahead in September 2010.

== Writing ==
The song is a synthpop/R&B song, written by Michico, T. Kura, the writers of Iconiq's debut single "I'm Lovin' You." The lyrics of the song describe an everyday scene, in which the subject of the song is dissatisfied with her life. She "purposely spills her coffee everywhere" and thinks that "every single day is like a ceremony." She decides to work against this daily pressure, by saying goodbye to this "dangerous pressure" and "complex that everyone, even her boyfriend has" by being true to herself.

== Promotion ==
Iconiq in the commercial for Shiseido's Maquillage range.

The song was used in commercials for Shiseido's Maquillage make-up range and starred Iconiq as the spokesperson, the third successive song of Iconiq's to have this, after "I'm Lovin' You" and "Change Myself." During album promotions, Iconiq promoted products from seven different companies simultaneously: All Nippon Airways, US fashion brand Kitson, Italian car manufacturer Maserati, Rhythm Zone, music download site Mu-Mo, Shiseido and Starbucks. Each commercial had two versions: one featuring "Bye Now!" as background music, along with versions using"Change Myself."

Iconiq performed this song as a per of her set at the 2010 A-Nation concerts.

== Music video ==
Iconiq performing a dance routine in the music video.

The music video was directed by Hisashi Kikuchi. The video centres around scenes of Iconiq performing a dance routine with several similarly dressed backup dancers, in a distinctive red hat. Several scenes of this dance are shot in the dark, and lit with fluorescent lighting that comes from each dancers' clothing. Also interspersed between these scenes are shots of Iconiq in different outfits, as she sings the song to the camera.

The music video was aired heavily in early March on several music video channels, such as MTV Japan's Buzz Clip, MJTV's MJ Bound, Music On!'s Rookie and VMC's Video of the Week.

== Chart rankings ==
Chart	Peak position
Billboard Adult Contemporary Airplay	5
Billboard Japan Hot 100	8
RIAJ Digital Track Chart Top 100: Special edit version	49
RIAJ Digital Track Chart Top 100	47

== Release history ==
"Bye Now!"
A sample from the chorus of "Bye Now!"

Region	Date	Format
Japan	March 3, 2010	Ringtone
Japan	March 10, 2010	Cellphone download (special edit version)
Japan	March 31, 2010	PC download, cellphone download (full-length version)
