= I'm Loving You =

"I'm Loving You" may refer to:

== Music ==
- "I'm Loving You", 1973 song by The Impressions, B-side to "Thin Line"
- "(I'm) Lovin' You" 1975 song by Bobby Vee
- "I'm Lovin' You", 2010 Japanese song by Iconiq
- "I'm Loving You Softly", song by Smokey Robinson
- "Tonight (I'm Lovin' You)", song by Enrique Iglesias
- "I'm Loving You More Every Day" 1965 song by Leela James
- "Yes, I'm Loving You" 1962 song by Big Al Downing
