= Light Ahead =

EP by Iconiq
- Released: September 15, 2010
- Recorded: 2010
- Studio: Avex Studio; Ambush Studio; BX Studio; Doh Studio; Giant Swing Studio
- Genre: J-pop; synthpop; R&B
- Length: 29:36
- Label: Rhythm Zone
- Producer: Ryuhei Chiba; Shinji Hayashi; Masato "Max" Matsuura (exec.); Shigekazu Takeuchi

Iconiq chronology
Change Myself (2010)	Light Ahead (2010)

Singles from Light Ahead
- 1. "Tokyo Lady" Released: August 11, 2010; 2. "Light Head" Released: September 15, 2010

Light Ahead is the first Japanese-language extended play by Japanese born-South Korean singer Iconiq, released on September 15, 2010, through Rhythm Zone. The EP contains seven tracks, including three songs from Change Myself, the promotional single "Tokyo Lady" and the lead single of the same name. The DVD features three music videos directed by Diane Martel, as well as footage from Iconiq's debut Japanese concert in May, 2010. On the cover she is shown turning round with some kind of headdress made of animal fur.

== Background ==
The extended play is Iconiq's third physical release in Japan, after her debut album Change Myself in March 2010, and her first physical single "Tokyo Lady" a month prior. Change Myself saw moderate commercial success, debuting at #3 and eventually selling over 60,000 copies. "Tokyo Lady" also saw some success, debuting in the top 20.

== Promotion ==
Much of the promotion of the EP centred on "Tokyo Lady," which was her fourth song used as the Shiseido Maquillage range commercial song, and the third commercial to feature Iconiq personally. The song was also used in a range of commercials for Recochoku, Weider and Jelly products and A-Nation 2010. Iconiq performed at A-Nation concerts in early August, including being one of the featured musicians on the Tetsuya Komuro-written theme song for the event, "Thx a Lot".

Three music videos were produced for the songs on the EP, including the video for "Tokyo Lady." The videos were all directed by veteran American music video director Diane Martel. One of these songs, the title track "Light Ahead," was used in commercials for Maquillage in September.

== Track listing ==
No.	Title	Writer(s)	Length
1.	"Girl Power"	Michico, T. Kura	3:51
2.	"Tokyo Lady"	NaNa Music, Uta	5:16
3.	"Change Myself"	Hiro	4:06
4.	"Light Ahead"	Momo "Mocha" N., U-Key Zone	5:02
5.	"I.D" (feat. Verbal (M-Flo))	Verbal, Suguru Yamamoto, Hisashi Nawata, Minami	4:10
6.	"Kiss & Cry"	Kaoru Kami, Tomokazu Matsuzawa	3:33
7.	"Bye Now!"	Michico, T. Kura	3:38
Total length:			29:36

DVD
No.	Title	Director	Length
1.	"Tokyo Lady (Music Video)"	Diane Martel
2.	"Light Ahead (Music Video)"	D. Martel
3.	"Kiss & Cry (Music Video)"	D. Martel
4.	"Iconiq Premium Live @ 2010.5.16 Shibuya AX"

== Charts and sales ==
Chart (2010)	Peak position
Oricon daily albums	10
Oricon weekly albums	18

=== Reported sales ===
Chart	Amount
Oricon physical sales	12,000

== Personnel ==
Personnel details were sourced from Light Ahead's liner notes booklet.

Managerial

- Akira Akutsu – advisory producer
- Hidemi Arasaki – advisory producer
- Ryuhei Chiba – general producer
- Shinya Egawa – A&R assistant
- Hideki Endo – advisory producer
- Tomomi Fujisawa – A&R
- Shinji Hayashi – general producer
- Yasuto Hoyamatsu – artist management supervisor
- Hiroshi Inagaki – executive supervisor
- Hitoshi Itagaki – artist management chief
- Nae Kodama – A&R desk
- Takuji Koga – sound director
- Takuya Konishi – artist management
- Harumasa Maeda – advisory producer
- Masato "Max" Matsuura – executive supervisor
- Hiroaki Nishiyama – A&R supervisor
- Nobutoshi Ono – Chief A&R
- Yoshihiro Seki – executive supervisor
- Hiroshi Shibuya – production co-ordinator (#4)
- Shigekazu Takeuchi – general producer
- Masatoshi Uchida – A&R supervisor
- Akihiko Yamamoto – Chief A&R
- Kyoko Yoshioka – artist management desk

Performance credits

- Hiro – instruments (#3)
- Iconiq – vocals, background vocals
- T. Kura – instruments (#1, #7)
- Tomokazu "T.O.M" Matsuzawa – instruments (#5)
- U-key Zone – instruments (#4)
- UTA – instruments (#2)
- Verbal – rap (#4)

Visuals and imagery

- Masaki Hanahara – designer
- Tadashi Harada – hair
- Satoshi Hirota – stylist
- Shiho Kikuchi – graphic designer
- Yasuyuki Nagashima – producer
- Ai Nieda – make-up
- Yuki Otani – designer
- Sonomi Sato – art director
- Satoshi Saïkusa – photographer
- Nobuko Yamada – make-up
- Koji Yamamoto – creative director
- Yoshihiro Yoshida – graphic designer

Technical and production

- Tom Coyne – mastering
- D.O.I. – mixing (at Daimonion Recordings)
- Taiki Fudanotsuji – assistant engineer
- Hiro – production (#3), programming (#3)
- Kami Kaoru – vocal production (#6)
- Kgro – vocal recording (#3)
- T. Kura – production (#1, #7), vocal recording (#1)
- Tomokazu "T.O.M" Matsuzawa – production (#6)
- Michico – vocal production (#1, #7)
- Momo "Mocha" N. – vocal production (#4)
- NaNa Music – vocal production (#2)
- Kohei Nakatake – assistant engineer
- Hisashi Nawata – additional arrangement (#5)
- Tomoe Nishikawa – vocal recording (#2)
- Osamu Shirota – vocal recording (#5)
- Yohei Takita – vocal recording (#4)
- U-key Zone – production (#4), vocal production (#4)
- UTA – production (#2), programming (#2), vocal production (#2)
- Lucas Valentine – recording (#5)
- Verbal – production (#5)
- Yutaro Wada – assistant engineer
- Tatsuhiro Yoshida – vocal recording (#6—7)

== Release history ==
Region	Date	Format
Japan	September 15, 2010	CD, digital download
Taiwan	September 17, 2010	CD
Hong Kong	September 21, 2010	CD
Japan	October 2, 2010	Rental CD
