= Diane Martel =

American music video director (1962–2025)

- Born: May 7, 1962; New York City, U.S.
- Died: September 18, 2025 (aged 63); New York City, U.S.
- Other names: Bucky Chrome; Diamond Martel; Ms. D
- Occupations: Film director; choreographer
- Years active: 1989–2025
- Relatives: Joseph Papp (uncle)

Diane Martel (May 7, 1962 – September 18, 2025) was an American music video director and choreographer. As a music video director, she worked with Beyoncé, Mariah Carey, Christina Aguilera, Ciara, Alicia Keys, Miley Cyrus and Jennifer Lopez. One of her most notable videos was for "Blurred Lines" (2013) by Robin Thicke featuring T.I. and Pharrell.

== Early life ==
Martel was born in Brooklyn, on May 7, 1962. Her uncle was theatre producer and director Joseph Papp.

== Career ==
Martel began her career as a street artist after dropping out of high school, and soon became a choreographer. Her first film-based projects in the early 1990s were dance-focused documentaries, including 1992's Wreckin' Shop: Live from Brooklyn, funded by the National Endowment for the Arts aired on PBS.

Martel began directing music videos in the early 1990s, beginning with "Throw Ya Gunz" by Onyx. Martel was creative director of Miley Cyrus's MTV Video Music Awards performance with Robin Thicke, the 2013 video for Cyrus's song "We Can't Stop", and her subsequent Bangerz Tour. Martel also directed the 2013 video for Thicke's song "Blurred Lines". Both the song and the video were accused of misogyny. Martel defended the video, saying she intended it to be satirical: "[The women in the video] are actually ridiculing the men. It's hysterical". Martel's career spanned more than thirty years, concluding with the video for "Ecstasy" by Ciara, released in April 2025.

In 2022, Martel was the Harlan J. Strauss Visiting Filmmaker at the University of Oregon.

== Death ==
Martel died of breast cancer at Memorial Sloan Kettering Cancer Center in New York City, on September 18, 2025, at the age of 63. She never married and had no children.

== Credits ==
=== Choreographer ===
- 1989: Bloodhounds of Broadway – film
- 1991: "Shiny Happy People" – R.E.M. music video, directed by Katherine Dieckmann
- 1993: Life with Mikey – feature film directed by James Lapine

=== Documentary director ===
- 1990: House of Tres – short documentary on voguing in the New York ballroom scene
- 1992: Reckin' Shop: Live From Brooklyn – PBS documentary about hip-hop dancers in Brooklyn

=== Music video director ===
==== 1990s ====
Year	Video	Artist	Ref.
1992	"Throw Ya Gunz"	Onyx	
1993	"Crewz Pop"	Da Youngsta's	
1993	"Dreamlover"	Mariah Carey	
1993	"Chief Rocka"	Lords of the Underground	
1994	"You're Always on My Mind"	SWV	
1994	"Happiness"	Billy Lawrence	
1994	"Bring the Pain"	Method Man	
1994	"What I'm After"	Lords of the Underground	
1994	"Mass Appeal"	Gang Starr	
1994	"Mad Props"	Da Youngsta's	
1994	"The Most Beautifullest Thing in This World"	Keith Murray	
1994	"All I Want for Christmas Is You"	Mariah Carey	
1994	"Miss You Most (At Christmas Time)"	Mariah Carey	
1994	"Anytime You Need a Friend" (unreleased)	Mariah Carey	
1995	"Can't Wait"	Redman	
1995	"Get Lifted"	Keith Murray	
1995	"Live Niguz"	Onyx	
1995	"Brooklyn Zoo"	Ol' Dirty Bastard	
1995	"I'll Be There for You/You're All I Need to Get By"	Method Man featuring Mary J. Blige	
1995	"How High"	Method Man & Redman	
1995	"The Riddler"	Method Man	
1996	"Funkorama"	Redman	
1996	"It's Alright"	Dave Hollister	
1996	"World So Cruel"	Flesh-n-Bone featuring Ms. Chaz Monique and Reverend Run	
1997	"Head over Heels"	Allure featuring Nas	
1997	"Closer/Driver's Seat"	Capone-N-Noreaga featuring Smoke of Complexions	
1997	"Just Wanna Please U" (Remix)	Mona Lisa featuring The Lox	
1997	"4, 3, 2, 1"	LL Cool J featuring Method Man, Redman, Canibus, and DMX	
1998	"The Worst"	Onyx featuring Wu-Tang Clan	
1998	"The Roof"	Mariah Carey	
1998	"Breakdown"	Mariah Carey featuring Bone Thugs-n-Harmony	
1998	"My All" (So So Def Remix)	Mariah Carey	
1998	"Whatcha Gonna Do?"	Jayo Felony featuring DMX and Method Man	
1998	"Whenever You Call"	Mariah Carey featuring Brian McKnight	
1998	"Money, Power & Respect"	The Lox featuring DMX and Lil' Kim	
1998	"Angel of Mine"	Monica	
1998	"N.O.R.E."	N.O.R.E.	
1998	"Eyes Better Not Wander"	Nicole Wray	
1999	"Heartbreaker" (Remix)	Mariah Carey	
1999	"Genie in a Bottle"	Christina Aguilera	
1999	"Watch Out Now/Turn It Out"	The Beatnuts	
1999	"Cre-A-Tine"	Cool Breeze	
1999	"Another Love Song"	Insane Clown Posse	
1999	"What a Girl Wants"	Christina Aguilera	
1999	"Incredible"	Keith Murray featuring LL Cool J	
1999	"Paper"	Krayzie Bone	
1999	"G'd Up"	Tha Eastsidaz featuring Snoop Dogg	

==== 2000s ====
Year	Video	Artist	Ref.
2000	"Case of the Ex"	Mýa	
2000	"Send It On"	D'Angelo	
2000	"If You Don't Wanna Love Me"	Tamar	
2000	"Keep It Thoro"	Prodigy	
2000	"Focus"	Erick Sermon featuring DJ Quik and Xzibit	
2000	"Front 2 Back"	Xzibit	
2001	"Who's That Girl?"	Eve	
2001	"Young, Fresh n' New"	Kelis	
2001	"Lapdance"	N.E.R.D.	
2001	"After the Rain Has Fallen"	Sting	
2002	"My Neck, My Back (Lick It)"	Khia	
2002	"Grindin'"	Clipse	as Bucky Chorme
2002	"Like I Love You"	Justin Timberlake	
2002	"Just a Friend 2002"	Mario	
2002	"From tha Chuuuch to da Palace"	Snoop Dogg	
2002	"Star"	702 featuring Clipse	
2002	"Provider"	N.E.R.D.	as Bucky Chrome
2002	"My Goddess"	The Exies	
2003	"Rest in Pieces"	Saliva	
2003	"Stuck"	Stacie Orrico	
2003	"Dance with My Father"	Luther Vandross	
2004	"Invisible"	Clay Aiken	
2004	"If I Ain't Got You"	Alicia Keys	
2004	"What's Happenin'"	Method Man featuring Busta Rhymes	
2004	"Welcome to My Truth"	Anastacia	
2004	"I Could Be the One"	Stacie Orrico	
2004	"Nobody's Home"	Avril Lavigne	
2004	"Truth Is"	Fantasia Barrino	
2004	"Bridging the Gap"	Nas	
2004	"Shake Your Coconuts"	Junior Senior	
2005	"Hold You Down"	Jennifer Lopez featuring Fat Joe	
2005	"Get Right" (Remix)	Jennifer Lopez featuring Fabolous	
2005	"Fearless"	The Bravery	
2005	"Don't Let It Go to Your Head"	Fefe Dobson	
2005	"So High"	John Legend	
2005	"I Don't Care"	Ricky Martin featuring Fat Joe and Amerie	
2005	"Gotta Go Gotta Leave (Tired)"	Vivian Green	
2005	"Touch"	Omarion	
2005	"Do You Want To"	Franz Ferdinand	
2005	"U Already Know"	112	
2005	"L.O.V.E."	Ashlee Simpson	
2006	"Doing Too Much"	Paula DeAnda featuring Baby Bash	
2006	"Ride a White Horse"	Goldfrapp	
2006	"In My Mind"	Heather Headley	
2006	"I'm Not Missing You"	Stacie Orrico	
2006	"Listen"	Beyoncé	
2006	"Tu Amor"	RBD	
2006	"Promise"	Ciara	
2007	"Read My Mind"	The Killers	
2007	"For Reasons Unknown"	The Killers	
2007	"Men's Needs"	The Cribs	
2007	"An End Has a Start"	Editors	
2007	"Conquest"	The White Stripes	
2007	"Like You'll Never See Me Again"	Alicia Keys	
2007	"Like a Boy"	Ciara	as Ms. D
2008	"The Boss"	Rick Ross	
2008	"Who's That Girl"	Robyn	
2008	"Google Me"	Teyana Taylor	
2008	"Everyone Nose (All the Girls Standing in the Line for the Bathroom)"	N.E.R.D.	
2008	"Addiction"	Ryan Leslie featuring Cassie and Fabolous	
2008	"Eat You Up" (American version, unreleased)	BoA	
2008	"Whatcha Think About That"	The Pussycat Dolls featuring Missy Elliott	
2008	"Best of Me"	Daniel Powter	
2009	"Mad"	Ne-Yo	
2009	"If This Isn't Love"	Jennifer Hudson	
2009	"Love Sex Magic"	Ciara featuring Justin Timberlake	
2009	"Outta Here"	Esmée Denters	
2009	"Show Me What I'm Looking For"	Carolina Liar	
2009	"Want"	Natalie Imbruglia	
2009	"Boys and Girls"	Pixie Lott	
2009	"3"	Britney Spears	
2009	"Sleza Glamura"	Irina Saltykova	

==== 2010s ====
Year	Video	Artist	Ref.
2010	"Whataya Want from Me"	Adam Lambert	
2010	"Missing"	Flyleaf	
2010	"Ride"	Ciara featuring Ludacris	
2010	"Kiss & Cry"	Iconiq	
2010	"Light Ahead"	Iconiq	
2010	"Tokyo Lady"	Iconiq	
2010	"Right Thru Me"	Nicki Minaj	
2011	"No One Gonna Love You"	Jennifer Hudson	
2011	"Best Thing I Never Had"	Beyoncé	
2011	"You Can't Be Friends with Everyone"	Make Out	
2011	"25/8"	Mary J. Blige	
2011	"Mr. Wrong"	Mary J. Blige	
2011	"Until It's Gone"	Monica	
2012	"Lazy Love"	Ne-Yo	
2012	"Brand New Me"	Alicia Keys	
2013	"Just Give Me a Reason"	Pink featuring Nate Ruess	
2013	"Leggo"	B. Smyth featuring 2 Chainz	
2013	"Blurred Lines"	Robin Thicke featuring T.I. and Pharrell	
2013	"Lolita"	Leah LaBelle	
2013	"We Can't Stop"	Miley Cyrus	
2013	"Give It 2 U"	Robin Thicke featuring 2 Chainz and Kendrick Lamar	
2013	"Evil Eye"	Franz Ferdinand	
2014	"Pills n Potions"	Nicki Minaj	
2015	"Ba$$in"	Yelle	
2015	"Love Me"	The 1975	
2015	"BB Talk"	Miley Cyrus	
2016	"After the Afterparty"	Charli XCX featuring Lil Yachty	
2017	"Old School"	Urban Cone	
2017	"Malibu"	Miley Cyrus	
2017	"A L I E N S"	Coldplay	
2017	"Younger Now"	Miley Cyrus	
2018	"Feel the Love Go"	Franz Ferdinand	
2018	"Give Yourself a Try"	The 1975	
2018	"Dose"	Ciara	Co-directed with Ciara and Jamsica Craft
2018	"Close to Me"	Ellie Goulding, Diplo and Swae Lee	

==== 2020s ====
Year	Video	Artist	Ref.
2020	"My Love"	Jack Gilinsky featuring Don Toliver	
2021	"Obsessed"	Addison Rae	
2021	"Billy Goodbye"	Franz Ferdinand	Co-directed with Alex Kapranos and Ben Cole
2021	"Make Some Money"	Fabolous and Dave East featuring Snoop Dogg	
2022	"Grace"	Marcus Mumford	
2022	"Ojala"	The Rudeboyz, Maluma and Adam Levine	
2023	"If I Ain't Got You" (Orchestral version)	Alicia Keys	
2023	"Lifeline"	Alicia Keys	
2025	"Ecstasy"	Ciara	

== Awards ==
Martel was nominated for the MTV Video Music Award for Video of the Year in 2000 for "What a Girl Wants" by Christina Aguilera, and in 2013 for "Blurred Lines" by Robin Thicke featuring T.I. and Pharrell.

In October 2025, Martel posthumously received the Legend Award at the 2025 UK Music Video Awards.
