= Five Stars (Myname album) =

- Regular Edition cover

Studio album by Myname
- Released: March 26, 2014
- Genre: Pop
- Length: 51:47
- Language: Japanese
- Label: YM3D

Myname chronology
Myname 3rd Single Album (2013)	Five Stars (2014)	Myname 2nd Mini Album (2015)

Singles from Five Stars
- 1. "Shirayuki" Released: November 20, 2013; 2. "F.F.Y." Released: March 12, 2014; 3. "Your Answer" Released: March 12, 2014

Five Stars is the second Japanese studio album by South Korean idol group Myname. It was released on March 26, 2014, under YM3D. A pop record, "Shirayuki" was released as the first single from the album. Leading up to the album, "F.F.Y." and "Your Answer" were made available on online music stores.

Five Stars was released in seven editions: Regular Edition, Limited Edition, and five online editions. It went on to debut at number five on Japan's national Oricon Albums Chart. By the end of its chart run, the album sold over 36,000 copies domestically. The group embarked on three legs of the Myname Live House Tour 2014 "Wow!", in addition to the Myname Japan 2nd Hall Tour 2014.

== Release and promotion ==
"Shirayuki" was released as the first single from the album on November 20, 2013. It peaked at number seven on the Japan's national Oricon Singles Chart, charting for three weeks and selling over 28,000 copies domestically. In midst of the Myname Japan Hall Tour 2014 "Hands Up" concert on January 12, 2014, the group announced the release of Five Stars scheduled for March 26. Preceding its release, "F.F.Y." and "Your Answer" were made available on online music stores on March 12.

A pop record, Five Stars was released in seven editions: Regular Edition; Limited Edition with bonus DVD content that includes the music videos for "Shirayuki" and "F.F.Y.", as well as the making film for the latter, and a live movie from the Myname Japan Hall Tour 2014 "Hands Up" concert at NHK Hall; a five online editions with a cover for each member. Myname held a release event at the Sunshine City building complex in Ikebukuro on the day of the album's release, where the group performed several songs from the record. The event drew in 2,000 attendees.

The quintet embarked on a series of shows entitled Myname Live House Tour 2014 "Wow!". The first pair of concerts took place between May 14–15 in Tokyo at Shinjuku Blaze and the Liquid Room, respectively, followed by back-to-back shows from May 17–18 in Kanagawa at Yokohama Bay Hall, with the third pair from May 20–21 in Osaka at Umeda Club Quattro. A second leg entitled Myname Live House Tour 2014 "Wow!" Vol.2 began on September 11 at Shinjuku Blaze, followed by a pair of shows between September 13–14 at Umeda Club Quattro and in Fukuoka at Drum Logos, respectively, and on September 21 in Miyagi at Rensa. The group concurrently initiated its Myname Japan 2nd Hall Tour 2014, which ran from September 19–20 at Zepp Nagoya and Zepp Namba, respectively, in Tokyo on September 28 at Nippon Seinenkan and September 30 at Shibuya Public Hall. In its third and last installment, Myname Live House Tour 2015 "Wow!" Vol. 3 took place from January 10–13, 2015, in Hiroshima at Club Quattro, Fukuoka at Drum Logos, and Osaka at Club Quattro, respectively, January 16 in Nagoya at Bottom Line, on January 18 at Yokohama Bay Hall, between January 24–25 in Kyoto at Fanj and Niigata at Lots, respectively. The final show Myname Live House Tour 2015 "Wow Special": Complete took place on January 31 in Tokyo at Studio Coast, where they performed 26 songs at the closing show.

== Commercial performance ==
Five Stars shifted 19,473 copies on its first day of release. On the chart dated April 7, 2014, the album debuted at number five on Japan's national Oricon Albums Chart, selling 30,081 in its first week. According to Oricon, it charted for four weeks and sold 36,154 copies domestically. On the Billboard Japan Top Albums Sales chart, Five Stars ranked at number 18.

== Track listing ==
Track listing
No.	Title	Writer(s)	Length
1.	"Klick"	Show, Sebastian Lundberg, Fredrik Haggstam, Johan Gustafson, Hayden Bell	3:46
2.	"Hocus Pocus"	Show, Caesar & Loui, Olof Lindskog, Andrew Jackson, Se-yong	3:07
3.	"F.F.Y."	Hiro, Synergy & Alex Valijani	3:41
4.	"Baby I'm Sorry" (Japanese ver.)	Ayumu Takeuchi, Crazy Park	3:43
5.	"Five Horses (Interlude)"	YM3D	1:37
6.	"Stars"	Hiro	4:39
7.	"Shirayuki"	INP, Lensei, Zen Nishizawa	4:58
8.	"We Made It"	Yadako, Jason Nevins, Jonny Rose, JunQ	3:34
9.	"Guilty as Charged" (In-soo feature song)	Show, Drew Ryan Scott, Carsten Lindberg	4:23
10.	"Sha La La"	INP, DCP, Zen Nishizawa	4:11
11.	"No Joke" (Se-yong & JunQ feature song)	Show, Crazy Park	3:20
12.	"Robot Boy" (Chae-jin feature song)	Show, Andrew Underberg, Rico Davis, Marquis Wallace	3:49
13.	"Your Answer" (Gun-woo feature song)	Leanne & Kanata, Robert Habolin, Terry Martin, Se-yong, JunQ	3:36
14.	"Girlfriend" (Japanese ver.)	Ayumu Takeuchi, Yoon Hee-jung, Urban Cllasik	3:23
Total length:			51:47

Limited Edition – bonus DVD content
No.	Title	Length
1.	"Shirayuki" (music video)
2.	"F.F.Y." (music video)
3.	"F.F.Y." (making video)
4.	"Live Movie 'Myname Japan Hall Tour2014: Hands Up' (2014.1.12 NHK Hall)"

== Charts ==
Chart (2014)	Peak position
Billboard Japan Top Albums Sales	18
Oricon Albums Chart	5
