= Lee Ahyumi =

Zainichi Korean singer (born 1984)

Ayumi/Yumi Itō
- 아유미 / 伊藤 ゆみ
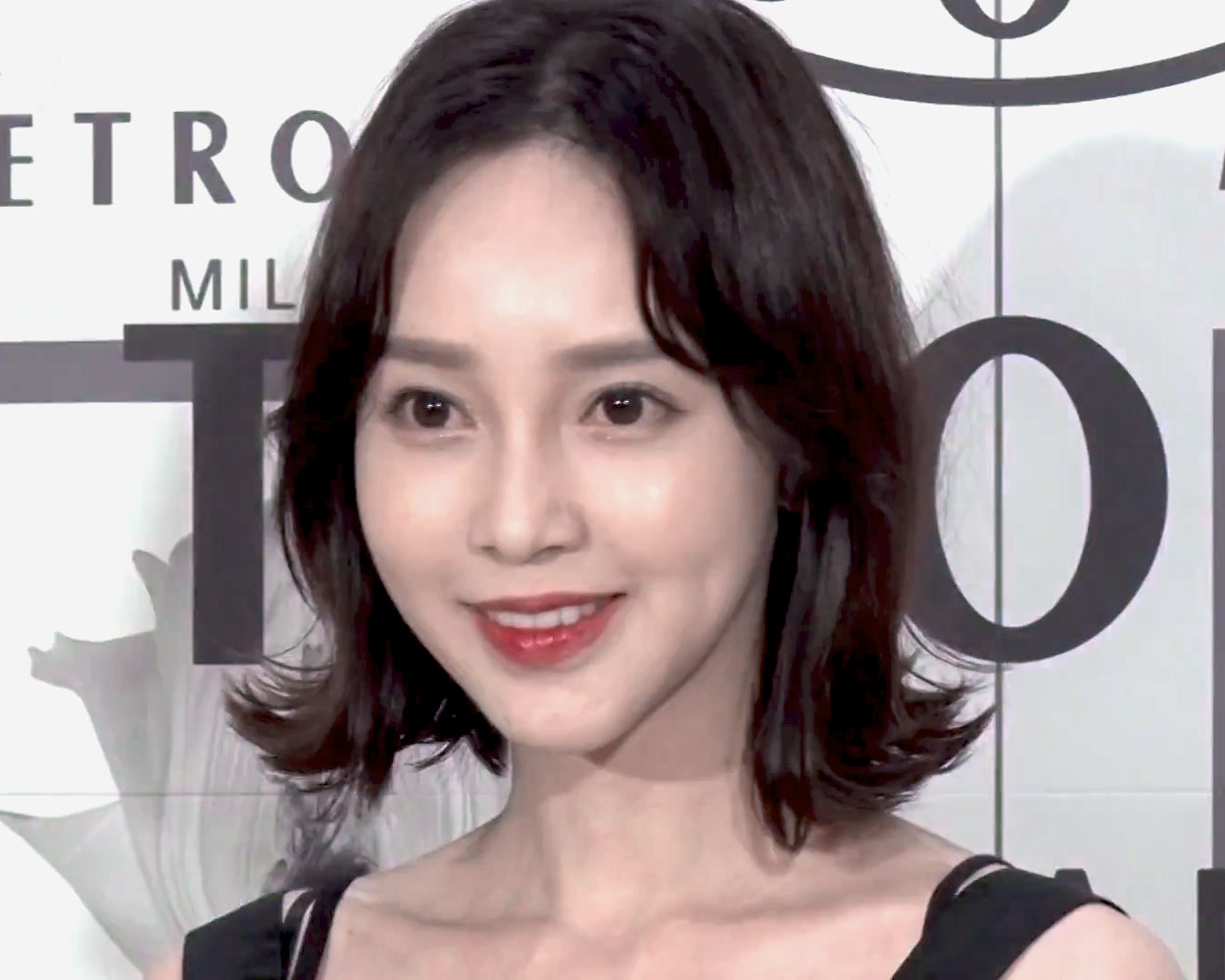
- Lee in 2018
- Born: Lee Ayumi; August 25, 1984 (age 42); Tottori, Japan
- Other name: Yumi Itō (Japanese alias)
- Education: Korea Kent Foreign School
- Occupations: Actress; singer; television personality
- Years active: 2001–present
- Agent: Bonboo ENT
- Spouse: Kwon Ki-beom (m. 2022)
- Children: 1
- Musical career
- Also known as: Ahyoomee; Iconiq
- Genres: K-pop; J-pop; R&B; Synthpop
- Instrument: Vocals
- Labels: Starworld (2001–2006); SM (2007); Avex (2009–2020)
- Formerly of: Sugar; SM Town
- Website: Official website

Japanese name
- Kanji: 伊藤 ゆみ
- Romanization: Itō Yumi

Korean name
- Hangul: 이아유미
- Hanja: 李亞由美
- RR: I Ayumi
- MR: I Ayumi

Lee Ayumi (born August 25, 1984), professionally known as Ayumi in South Korea and Yumi Itō in Japan, is a Japanese-born South Korean singer, actress, and television personality based in South Korea. She debuted under the stage name Ahyoomee in 2001 as the leader and lead vocalist of the South Korean girl group Sugar, a position she held until the group's disbandment in 2006.

Following the disbandment, Lee began a solo career in South Korea under SM Entertainment, releasing two digital singles. In 2008, she returned to Japan and began her acting career under the Japanese stage name Yumi Itō. The following year, she debuted as a solo singer in Japan under Avex's Rhythm Zone label, using the stage name Iconiq. As Iconiq, she released one studio album, one extended play, and seven digital singles.

== Early life ==
Lee Ayumi was born in Tottori, Japan, on August 25, 1984, to a Korean mother from Seoul and a father who is a second-generation ethnic Korean living in Japan. She lived in Japan until the age of 15, when she moved to South Korea, where she later attended the Korea Kent Foreign School (Korean Kent Foreign School).

== Career ==
=== 2001–2006: Sugar ===
Ayumi was scouted by the entertainment company Starworld at a H.O.T. concert, and later debuted as a member of the South Korean girl group Sugar in 2001. The group released two albums in Japan and three in South Korea, achieving moderate commercial success.

During her time with Sugar, Ahyoomee and fellow member Park Soo-jin appeared as guests on the 200th-episode special of Gag Concert in the sketch Poncho Siblings (우비 삼남매), becoming the first girl group to appear on the program. In December 2006, Starworld announced that Sugar's members would not be offered contract renewals, leading to the group's disbandment following the expiration of their contracts.

=== 2006–2012: Solo career ===
Lee released her first digital single as a solo artist, "Cutie Honey," on July 13, 2006, under a new romanization of her stage name, AhYooMi. The song was originally performed by Kumi Koda as the theme song for the Cutie Honey anime series. Her second single, a cover of Kim Gun-mo's song "Wrongful Meeting," was released on November 7, 2006.

On February 15, 2007, her former label Starworld requested SM Entertainment to take over her management following the expiration of her contract on February 13. Under SM Entertainment, Lee participated in SM Town's seasonal albums later that year. However, she did not release any solo material during this period.

In 2008, Lee moved to West Hollywood, California, where she attended dance and vocal training schools.

In 2009, she returned to Japan and signed with Avex's Rhythm Zone label, debuting as a solo artist under the stage name Iconiq. She became a model for Shiseido's Maquillage cosmetics line and released the single "I'm Lovin' You" featuring Atsushi of Exile as a promotional track. Her image was prominently featured in the campaign's billboard advertisements. Iconiq's image was strongly associated with her distinctive buzz cut hairstyle.

Lee released her debut studio album, Change Myself, on March 10, 2010. The album included the promotional singles "Change Myself" and "Bye Now!", both used in the Maquillage advertising campaign. The album debuted at number three on the Oricon Albums Chart, marking the highest chart position for a debut album since Yui Aragaki's Sora in late 2007. On August 11, 2010, she released her first physical single, "Tokyo Lady", which was later included in her first extended play, Light Ahead, released in September 2010. The EP was promoted through three music videos directed by Diane Martel.

After a two-year hiatus from music, Lee released two digital singles on March 14, 2012, titled "LADIES" and "MAKE IT RIGHT."

=== 2015–present: Acting career and return to South Korea ===
Lee returned to South Korea in 2015, appearing on the JTBC talk show Witch Hunt, marking her first television appearance in South Korea in nine years.

In August 2016, during an interview with SENSE (ja) magazine, Lee stated that she would return to acting under the name Yumi Itō. The following month, she portrayed Michiru Saiki in the stage adaptation of the manga ReLIFE.

In May 2017, Lee was cast in the Fuji TV drama Code Blue: Season 3. In August 2017, she officially resumed her activities in South Korea after being confirmed as a cast member of MBN's variety show Flight Girl.

In March 2019, Lee signed a contract with the South Korean agency BONBOO Entertainment. On January 20, 2020, she announced through her blog that she would be leaving Avex after eleven years, following the expiration of her contract.

== Personal life ==
In September 2022, Lee released pre-wedding photographs announcing that she would marry her non-celebrity foreign boyfriend on October 30, 2022. Her husband, Kwon Ki-beom, is a businessman.

On January 9, 2024, Lee announced that she was expecting her first child. On June 15, 2024, she announced that she had given birth to her first child, a daughter, on June 10.

== Discography ==
=== Studio album ===
List of albums, with selected chart positions
Title	Album details	Peak positions		Sales
Title	Album details	JPN	KOR	Sales
Change Myself	Released: March 10, 2010 (JPN); Label: Rhythm Zone; Formats: CD, CD/DVD, digital download	3	47	JPN: 63,635

=== Extended play ===
List of albums, with selected chart positions
Title	Album details	Peak positions	Sales
Title	Album details	JPN	Sales
Light Ahead	Released: September 15, 2010 (JPN); Label: Rhythm Zone; Formats: CD, CD/DVD, digital download	18	JPN: 11,845

=== Singles ===
List of singles, with selected chart positions
Title	Year	Peak chart positions			Sales	Album
Title	Year	JPN	JPN Hot (Note: Sources for chart positions are as follows: "I'm Lovin' You", "Bye Now!", "Change Myself", "Tokyo Lady", "Light Ahead".)	JPN Dig. (Note: The RIAJ Digital Track Chart is a depreciated chart that ran from 2009 until early 2012 and tracked full-length cellphone downloads.) (Note: Sources for chart positions are as follows: "I'm Lovin' You", "Change Myself", "Bye Now!", "Light Ahead".)	Sales	Album
"Cutie Honey" (Note: Released in South Korea under the name Ahyoomee.)	2006	—	—	—	—	Non-album single
"Jalmosdoen Mannam" (Korean: 잘못된 만남, "Wrongful Meeting")	2006	—	—	—	—	Non-album single
"I'm Lovin' You" (Iconiq x Exile Atsushi)	2010	—	47	8	—	Change Myself
"Change Myself"	2010	—	73	20	—	Change Myself
"Bye Now!"	2010	—	8	47	—	Change Myself
"Tokyo Lady"	2010	19	21	—	JPN: 9,840	Light Ahead
"Light Ahead"	2010	—	49	62	—	Light Ahead
"Yeoja" (여자, "Ladies")	2012	—	—	—	—	"Ladies"
"Make It Right"	2012	—	—	—	—	"Ladies"
"—" denotes releases that did not chart or were not released in that region.

== Filmography ==
=== Film ===
Year	Title	Role	Notes
2009	The Promised Land	Lee Ayumi	Lead role
2009	Waiting for Good News	Rika Aragaki	
2018	The Cat in Their Arms		
2018	Code Blue: The Movie		
2019	Go Away, Ultramarine		
2019	Walking Man	Kim	

=== Television drama ===
Year	Title	Role	Notes
2006	Rainbow Romance	Ah Yoo Mi	Supporting role; Sitcom
2008	Binbo Danshi	Kurata Watana	Supporting role
2008	Yottsu no uso	Miyabe	Supporting role
2012	Ataru	Kashiwabara Yumi	Cameo
2013	Machigawarechatta Otoko	Erika Momoyama	
2017	Code Blue: "Doctor Helicopter Emergency Rescue"	Kyoko Machida	
2020	Backstreet Rookie	Herself	Cameo

=== Television shows ===
Year	Title	Role	Notes	Ref.
2017–2018	Flight Girl	Cast Member		
2019	Life Bar	Cast Member		
2021–present	Goal Girl	Cast Member	Season 2–3	
2022	Same Bed, Different Dreams 2: You Are My Destiny	Cast Member		

== Awards and nominations ==
=== Korean Music Awards ===
Year	Nominee / work	Award	Result
Korean Music Awards 2007	Cutie Honey	Album of the Year	Won
Korean Music Awards 2007	Cutie Honey	Best Pop Album	Nominated
