= What's Up (Myname song) =

- Web Edition cover

Single by Myname

from the album We Are Myname
- Language: Japanese
- Released: November 21, 2012
- Recorded: 2012
- Genre: Pop
- Label: YM3D
- Songwriters: Hiro; Keith Harris; Elijah Kelley; George Pajon, Jr.

Myname singles chronology
"Hello & Goodbye" (2012)	"What's Up" (2012)	"Replay (Japanese ver.)" (2012)

"What's Up" is a song by South Korean idol group Myname. It was released on November 21, 2012, as its second Japanese single under YM3D. It is a pop song written by Hiro, Keith Harris, Elijah Kelley, and George Pajon, Jr, and the quintet's first original Japanese-language single.

"What's Up" was released in three editions: Web Edition, and Limited Editions A and B. It peaked at number 14 on Japan's weekly national Oricon Singles Chart, selling over 22,000 physical copies by the end of its chart run. In order to promote the single, the group held two concerts entitled Myname 1st Live "What's Up". The song was included in the group's debut Japanese album We Are Myname (2013).

== Composition ==
"What's Up" was written by Hiro, Keith Harris, Elijah Kelley, and George Pajon, Jr. A pop song, it is Myname's first original Japanese-language single.

== Release and promotion ==
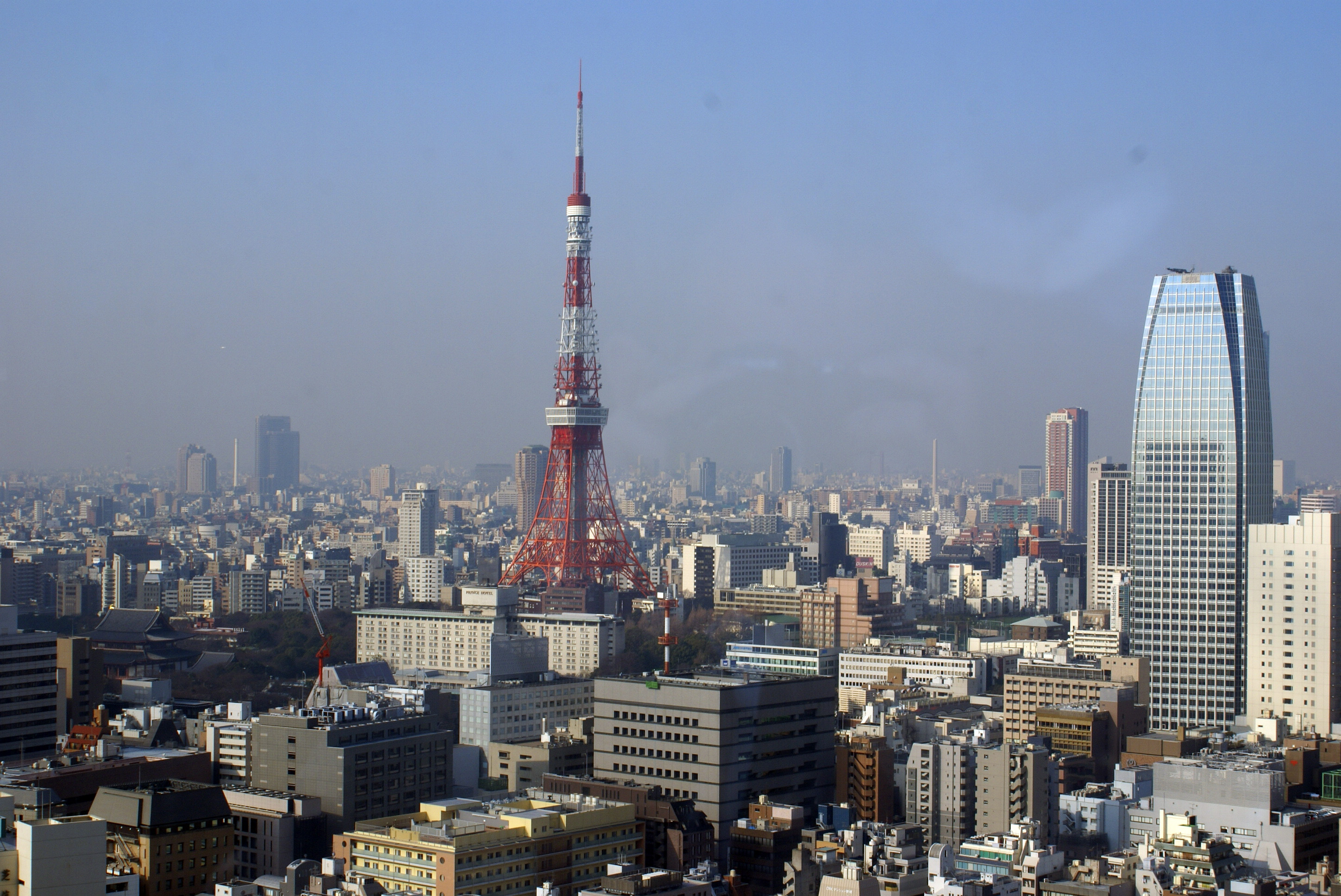
The music video for "What's Up" showcases a rooftop view of the Tokyo Tower and the surrounding city

"What's Up" was first announced on August 27, 2012, with a scheduled release date of November 21. Leading up to its release, a music video teaser for the Japanese version of "Hello & Goodbye" was uploaded on YouTube on October 12, with the full video released five days later. The music video for "What's Up" was released on October 24. The video was filmed on a building rooftop in view Tokyo, including the Tokyo Tower. The title track was made available on online music store Recochoku on November 14. The song was used as the ending theme song for Fuji Television's music variety show Hey! Hey! Hey! Music Champ from October to December, as well as for Nagoya TV's King Kong no Aru Koto Nai Koto for November.

"What's Up" was released in three editions: Web Edition; Limited Edition A with bonus DVD content that includes the music video and making film of "What's Up"; and Limited Edition B with bonus DVD content that includes the music video and bonus material of the Japanese version of "Hello & Goodbye". Myname held a release event at LaQua in Tokyo Dome City three days after the single's release. The event drew in 1,500 attendees. The quintet also performed two shows entitled Myname 1st Live "What's Up" as promotion. The concerts took place on December 15 at Zepp Namba and on December 17 at Zepp Tokyo. "What's Up" was included in the group's debut Japanese studio album We Are Myname (2013).

== Commercial performance ==
On the issue dated December 3, 2012, "What's Up" debuted at number nine on Japan's national Oricon Singles Chart, selling 19,366 copies in its first week of release. According to Oricon, the single charted for three weeks and sold 22,741 copies in the country by the end of its run. The song also ranked at number 85 on the Billboard Japan Hot 100 chart.

== Track listing ==
Web Edition
No.	Title	Writer(s)	Length
1.	"What's Up"	Hiro, Keith Harris, Elijah Kelley, George Pajon, Jr.	4:44
2.	"Hello & Goodbye" (Japanese ver.)	Show, Jkbeat×Ho-seung	3:21
3.	"What's Up" (off vocal ver.)	Hiro, Keith Harris, Elijah Kelley, George Pajon, Jr.	4:44
4.	"Hello & Goodbye" (Japanese ver.) (off vocal ver.)	Show, Jkbeat×Ho-seung	3:20
5.	"Everlastin' Luv" (acoustic ver.)

Limited Edition A
No.	Title	Writer(s)	Length
1.	"What's Up"	Hiro, Keith Harris, Elijah Kelley, George Pajon, Jr.	4:44
2.	"Hello & Goodbye" (Japanese ver.)	Show, Jkbeat×Ho-seung	4:21
3.	"Adrenaline"	Hiro, Jörgen Elofsson, Lauren Dyson, Anders Lystell, Jesper Jakobson, JunQ	3:19
4.	"What's Up" (off vocal ver.)	Hiro, Keith Harris, Elijah Kelley, George Pajon, Jr.	4:44
5.	"Hello & Goodbye" (Japanese ver.) (off vocal ver.)	Show, Jkbeat×Ho-seung	3:20
6.	"Adrenaline" (off vocal ver.)	Hiro, Jörgen Elofsson, Lauren Dyson, Anders Lystell, Jesper Jakobson, JunQ	3:17

Limited Edition A — bonus DVD content
No.	Title	Length
1.	"What's Up" (music video)
2.	"What's Up" (making video)

Limited Edition B
No.	Title	Writer(s)	Length
1.	"What's Up"	Hiro, Keith Harris, Elijah Kelley, George Pajon, Jr.	4:44
2.	"Hello & Goodbye" (Japanese ver.)	Show, Jkbeat×Ho-seung	3:21
3.	"Read Between the Lines"	Yadako, Chris Rojas, Andrew Fromm, Thomas Barsoe	4:00
4.	"What's Up" (off vocal ver.)	Hiro, Keith Harris, Elijah Kelley, George Pajon, Jr.	4:44
5.	"Hello & Goodbye" (Japanese ver.) (off vocal ver.)	Show, Jkbeat×Ho-seung	3:20
6.	"Read Between the Lines" (off vocal ver.)	Yadako, Chris Rojas, Andrew Fromm, Thomas Barsoe	4:00

Limited Edition B — bonus DVD content
No.	Title	Length
1.	"Hello & Goodbye" (Japanese ver.) (music video)
2.	"Hello & Goodbye" (Japanese ver.) (bonus material)

== Charts ==
Japanese version
Chart (2012)	Peak position
Billboard Japan Hot 100	85
Oricon Singles Chart	9
