= We Are Myname =

- Regular Edition cover

Studio album by Myname
- Released: March 27, 2013
- Genre: Dance
- Length: 47:25
- Language: Japanese
- Label: YM3D

Myname chronology
Myname 2nd Single (2013)	We Are Myname (2013)	Myname 1st Mini Album (2013)

Singles from We Are Myname
- 1. "Message (Japanese ver.)" Released: July 25, 2012; 2. "What's Up" Released: November 21, 2012; 3. "Replay (Japanese ver.)" Released: January 13, 2013; 4. "We Are the Night" Released: January 23, 2013

We Are Myname (stylized WE ARE MYNAME) is the debut Japanese studio album by South Korean idol group Myname. It was released by YM3D on March 27, 2013. Musically, the record is filled with dance music and balladry. Initially debuting in its home country, the group re-recorded its debut single and released "Message (Japanese ver.)" as its first single in Japan. Myname released "What's Up" as its second single, an original song. Leading up to the album, "Replay (Japanese ver.)" and "We Are the Night" were made available on online music stores.

We Are Myname was released in three editions: Regular Edition, Limited Edition, and Limited Chara-Ani Edition. It went on to debut at number three on Japan's national Oricon Albums Chart. By the end of its chart run, the album sold over 37,000 copies domestically. The group embarked on the Myname Live Tour 2013 "The Departure" concert tour, which drew in 8,000 concertgoers from three shows in Osaka, Nagoya, and Tokyo.

== Music structure ==
We Are Myname encompasses dance music and balladry. "We Are the Night" is a dance track filled with electro music. "Anonymous" is an electronic song accompanied by elements of African music. Gun-woo described it as an experimental "aggressive" song with an "addictive melody". A Japanese-language remake of the original Korean version, "Replay" is a mid-tempo ballad that incorporates a piano, an acoustic guitar, and other string instruments.

== Release and promotion ==
After debuting in its home country of South Korea with "Message" in October of the previous year, Myname re-recorded the song for its debut in the Japanese market on July 25, 2012. The single peaked at number 14 on the country's Oricon Singles Chart, charting for five weeks and selling over 17,000 copies domestically. An original Japanese-language song, "What's Up" was released as the group's second single. It ranked at number nine on the Singles Chart and charted for three weeks, shifting over 22,000 units in Japan.

On December 15, the release of Myname's first Japanese studio album was publicized. We Are Myname was unveiled on January 3, 2013, with a release date of March 27. Preceding its release, "Replay (Japanese ver.)" and "We Are the Night" were made available on online music stores on January 16 and January 23, respectively. The former was used as the closing theme song for Nagoya TV's King Kong no Aru Koto Nai Koto; the latter was used on Nippon TV's drama Otasukeya Jinpachi.

We Are Myname was released in three editions: Regular Edition; Limited Edition with bonus DVD content that includes the music videos for "Message (Japanese ver.)", "Summer Party", "What's Up", "Hello & Goodbye (Japanese ver.)", "We Are the Night", and "Pari Pari ('Just a Little Thing' Japanese ver.)", and a live movie from the Myname 1st Live "What's Up" concert at Zepp Tokyo; and a Limited Chara-Ani Edition. Myname held a release event at the Tower Records Japan store in Shibuya on the day of the album's release, where the group performed several songs from the record. The event drew in 350 attendees.

The quintet embarked on the Myname Live Tour 2013 "The Departure" concert tour. The first pair of concerts took place between May 18–19 at the Zepp music halls in Osaka and Nagoya, respectively, with a third concert taking place on May 25 at Zepp Diver City in Tokyo. Performing 22 songs at the closing show, the tour accumulated 8,000 attendees in total. The final concert was recorded, which spawned the release of a two-disc DVD live album. It was released on December 11.

== Commercial performance ==
We Are Myname shifted 20,787 units on its first day of release. On the chart dated April 8, 2013, it debuted at number three on Japan's national Oricon Albums Chart, selling 27,813 copies in its first week. By the end of its run, the album charted for five weeks and sold 37,240 copies domestically. On the Billboard Japan Top Albums Sales chart, We Are Myname ranked at number 13.

== Track listing ==
Track listing
No.	Title	Writer(s)	Length
1.	"Intro (Departure of the Ship)"		1:10
2.	"We Are the Night"	Hiro, Greg Bonnick, Leon Price, Hayden Chapman, Charley Greenberg, Daniel Andrew Wayne, Cody Taylor Williams, Carlos Peña, Se-yong	3:57
3.	"Message" (Japanese ver.)	Hiro, Han Sang-won, Ban Hyung-moon	3:46
4.	"(If You Wanna) Be My Baby"	Sty, Andrew Jackson, Stephen Cornish	2:50
5.	"Hello & Goodbye" (Japanese ver.)	By Show, Jkbeat×Ho-seung	3:19
6.	"What's Up"	Hiro, Keith Harris, Elijah Kelley, George Pajon, Jr.	4:42
7.	"Anonymous"	Sty, Andrew Jackson, Fredrik Haggstam, Sebastian Lundberg, Johan Gustafson	3:45
8.	"Rum Bum Bum"	Hiro, Kavedo, Jonny RoseE, Future Presidents, JunQ	3:54
9.	"Interlude (Sea of Love)"		1:41
10.	"Read Between the Lines"	Yadako, Chris Rojas, Andrew Fromm, Thomas Barsoe	3:59
11.	"Replay" (Japanese ver.)	INP, Pino, Show, Jkbeat×Ho-seung	3:51
12.	"Beautiful Life"	Kanata Nakamura, Chris Rojas, Eddie Serrano, Phill Kross, Bei Maejor	3:33
13.	"Pari Pari" ("Just a Little Thing" (그까짓거) Japanese ver.)	Kei Odate, I Ra, Mitsu.J, Crazy Park	3:40
14.	"You're Waiting for Me"	Kanata Nakamura, Peter Gordeno, John McLaughlin, JunQ	3:18
Total length:			47:25

Limited Edition – bonus DVD content
No.	Title	Length
1.	"Live Movie Myname 1st Live: What's Up (2012.12.17 Zepp Tokyo)"
2.	"Message (Japanese ver.)", "Summer Party", "What's Up", "Hello & Goodbye (Japanese ver.)", "We Are the Night", "Pari Pari ("Just a Little Thing" (그까짓거) Japanese ver.)" (music clips)

== Charts ==
Chart (2015)	Peak position
Billboard Japan Top Albums Sales	13
Oricon Albums Chart	3
