= Change Myself =

Studio album by Iconiq
- Released: March 10, 2010
- Recorded: 2009
- Genre: J-pop; R&B
- Length: 36:08
- Label: Rhythm Zone

Iconiq chronology
Change Myself (2010)	Light Ahead (2010)

Singles from Change Myself
- 1. "I'm Lovin' You" Released: January 27, 2010 (digital download); 2. "Change Myself" Released: March 3, 2010 (digital download); 3. "Bye Now!" Released: March 10, 2010 (digital download)

Change Myself is the debut Japanese-language studio album by South Korean singer-born in Japan Iconiq, released on March 10, 2010. The album was initially planned for a February 24 release, which was postponed for two weeks.

== Background ==
Iconiq originally released music in Japan and South Korea as a member of South Korean girl-group Sugar. Iconiq previously released two solo singles under the name Ahyoomee in South Korea in 2006, following Sugar disbanding in December 2006. In 2008, Iconiq moved to West Hollywood, California, to study at dance and vocal schools. Iconiq cites this trip for the inspiration for the change/rebirth theme of her Japanese debut.

Iconiq returned to Japan in 2009, signed as an artist to Avex Entertainment. The stage name Iconiq was chosen for her re-debut, due to its strong impact and personal meaning/goal, "to become an icon for the era." believing the name had strong impact.

== Promotion ==
The bulk of the marketing for the album centred on Iconiq's buzz cut hair-style, often marketed as "baby short hair" (ベビーショートヘア), along with the catch-phrase "Watashi ga kawaru. Ongaku de kawaru." (私が変わる。音楽で変わる。, I change. I change through music.) Her hair style was suggested by her management as a strong image to complement her desire for a theme of change.

Large-scale billboards showcasing Iconiq's hairstyle started appearing in Japanese city centres in late November, 2009. At the same time, her song "I'm Lovin' You" (a duet with Exile vocalist Atsushi) started airing in commercials for Shiseido's Maquillage cosmetics line, featuring actress Juri Ueno.

"I'm Lovin' You" was announced as Iconiq's debut digital single, first released as a ringtone at Recochoku on December 9. The ringtone was the most popular at Recochoku for an entire week, the first time a debut artist has achieved this. By late January, the song had been downloaded as a ringtone approximately 300,000 times. On January 27, the song was simultaneously released as a cellphone digital download, as well as a special rental store only single.

Iconiq's second Maquillage commercial for Shiseido featured her personally, and was first announced in a press conference with a mini-live on 19 January. The new commercial song, "Change Myself," was produced by Hiro, who is known for producing such artists like Kumi Koda and Namie Amuro. The change concept and catch-phrase are directly related to the lyrics of the song, such as the chorus line "no datte yes ni kaete ikeru" (NOだってYESに変えて行ける, If it's a no, I'll change it to a yes.). The song was released as a ringtone through Recochoku on the 20th, and the commercial began airing on the 21st. Much like its predecessor, the song debuted at #1 on Recochoku's weekly ranking chart. It was released as a download to cellphones on March 3. "Bye Now!" followed as Iconiq's third Maquillage commercial in late February.

Starting a day before the album's release, Iconiq was the featured spokesperson for All Nippon Airways, US fashion brand Kitson, Italian car manufacturer Maserati, Rhythm Zone, music download site Mu-Mo, Shiseido and Starbucks. This was the first time a single person had promoted seven companies simultaneously in Japan. Each commercial was marketed with Iconiq's marketing phrase "I change. I change through music"; however, the company name replaced "music" in each instance.

Iconiq also appeared in many fashion and music centred magazines, most notably on the cover of Ginger's February 2010 issue. She also featured in publications such as Anan, Barfout!, Bea's Up, Classy, Flava, Frau, Gekkan Exile, Glamorous, Jelly, Junon, Nikkan Entertainment, Sōen, Tokyo Headline, Vivi and Voce.

== Chart reception ==
In the album's first week, it debuted at #3 on Oricon's album charts, selling 32,000 copies. This was the first top three position debut album since Yui Aragaki's Sora in late 2007. The album one further week in the top 10, eventually charting in the top 300 albums for 10 weeks, and selling a total of 63,000 copies.

Each digital single had moderate charting success. "I'm Lovin' You" reached #8 on RIAJ's full-length cellphone download Digital Track Chart in February. "Change Myself"'s special edit version charted at #20, with the full-length version later peaking at #34. "Change Myself" also received minor airplay the week of the album's release, enough to reach #73 on Billboard's Japan Hot 100 chart. "Bye Now!" saw success on Billboard, peaking at #8 during the album's promotion due to strong airplay. It did not chart as highly as the other singles on the digital track charts, peaking at #47 (with the special edited version peaking at #49).

A special medley of the three promotional singles used in Shiseido Maquillage commercials saw minor digital success, peaking at #58.

== Track listing ==
No.	Title	Writer(s)	Length
1.	"Prologue"	T. Kura	1:16
2.	"I'm Lovin' You" (Iconiq x Exile Atsushi)	Michico, T. Kura	3:31
3.	"Change Myself"	Hiro	4:05
4.	"LoveShineMagic"	Nana Music, Markie	4:35
5.	"Bye Now!"	Michico, T. Kura	3:38
6.	"I.D" (feat. Verbal (M-Flo))	Verbal, Hisashi Nawata	4:09
7.	"No Distance"	Kaoru Kami, Tomokazu Matsuzawa	5:13
8.	"Crystal Girl"	Nana Music, Uta	4:48
9.	"Like a Virgin" (Madonna cover)	Billy Steinberg, Tom Kelly	5:13
10.	"Epilogue"	T. Kura	1:26
Total length:			36:08

DVD
No.	Title	Director	Length
1.	"I'm Lovin' You (Music Video)" (Iconiq x Exile Atsushi)
2.	"Change Myself (Music Video)"	Yasuhiko Shimizu
3.	"Bye Now! (Music Video)"	Hisashi Kikuchi
4.	"Crystal Girl (Music Video)"

== Chart rankings ==
"I'm Lovin' You"
A sample from Iconiq's collaboration with Exile vocalist Atsushi.

"Change Myself"
A sample from the Hiro-produced title track from the album.

"Bye Now!"
A sample from the third digital single released from the album.

Chart (2010)	Peak position
Oricon weekly albums	3
Soundscan weekly albums (CD+DVD)	4
Soundscan weekly albums (CD only)	16

=== Reported sales ===
Chart	Amount
Oricon physical sales	64,000

== Release history ==
Region	Date	Format	Distributing label
Japan	March 10, 2010	CD	Rhythm Zone
Taiwan	March 12, 2010	CD	Avex Asia
South Korea	March 17, 2010	CD	SM Entertainment
Hong Kong	March 26, 2010	CD	Avex Asia
Japan	March 27, 2010	Rental CD	Rhythm Zone
Japan	March 31, 2010	PC download, cellphone download	Rhythm Zone
