= Myname 2nd Mini Album =

Myname mini-album

EP by Myname
- Released: February 12, 2015
- Length: 21:44
- Language: Korean
- Label: H2 Media

Myname chronology
Five Stars (2014)	Myname 2nd Mini Album (2015)	I.M.G.: Without You (2015)

Singles from Myname 2nd Mini Album
- 1. "Too Very So Much" Released: February 12, 2015

Myname 2nd Mini Album is the second mini-album by South Korean idol group Myname. It was released on February 12, 2015, by H2 Media and distributed by Kakao M. Following a series of photo and video teasers, the album and its lead single "Too Very So Much" were concurrently released. They promoted the song by performing it on music chart programs across various television networks. Myname 2nd Mini Album peaked at number three South Korea's national Gaon Album Chart, shifting over 4,500 units domestically since its release.

== Background and music structure ==
Myname released Myname 3rd Single Album and its lead single "Day by Day" on October 11, 2013. After concluding domestic promotions, the group's focus shifted to the Japanese music market; it resulted in a gap of one year and four months between the release of their previous single album and Myname 2nd Mini Album. Myname was given several tracks while recording new music, including "Too Very So Much". The song was not intended to be a single and the members had reservations over its unusual title, but they concluded that it was a "fun" song and decided it was the best candidate to serve as a lead single.

Sonically, Myname 2nd Mini Album ranges from electronic music to balladry. With its foundation in hip hop, "Too Very So Much" describes a man incapable of dealing with being in love. The track incorporates a "groovy" drum coupled with a prominent "funky" bassline. "Broken Watch" is a "mournful" ballad.

== Release and promotion ==
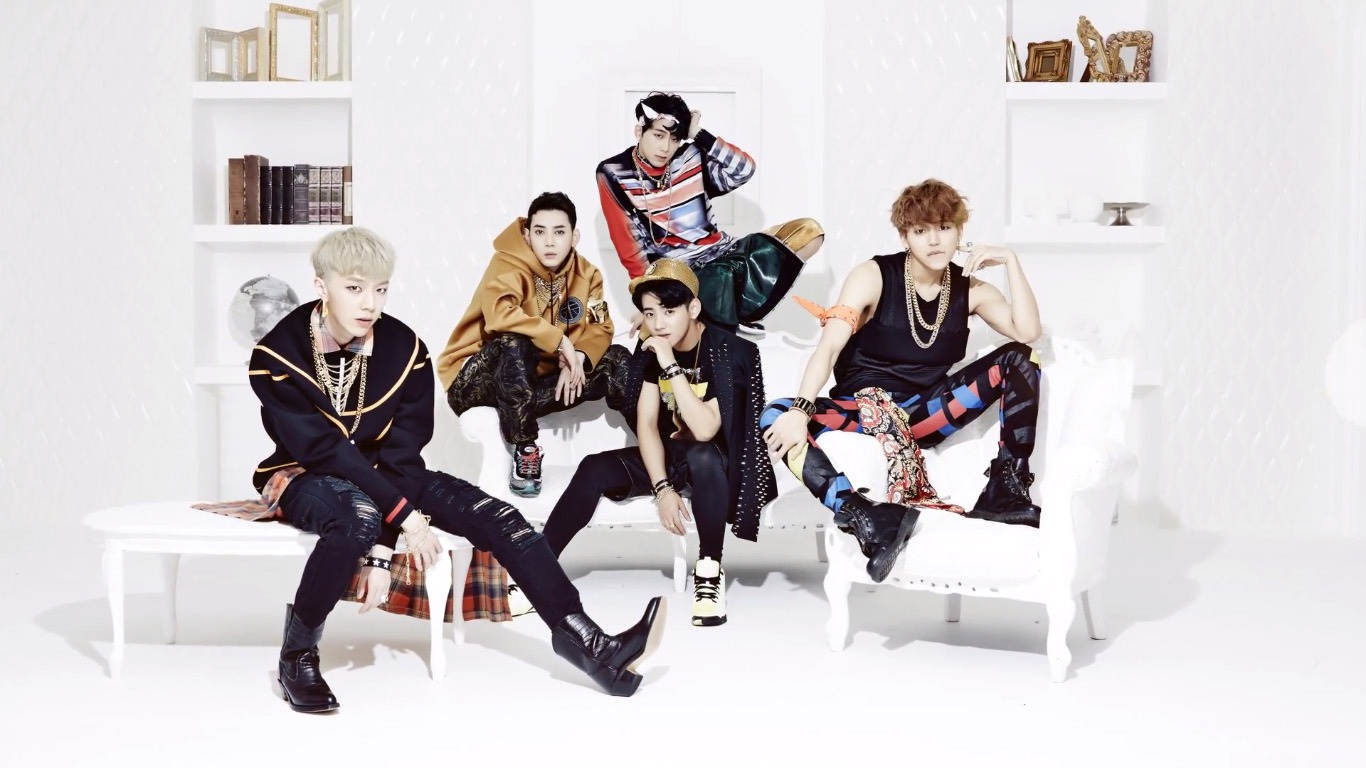
A promotional image for Myname 2nd Mini Album

H2 Media published a teaser photo of the group members on February 2, 2015. Myname adopted a street hip-hop "bad boy" concept for Myname 2nd Mini Album. Two days later, the agency uploaded a video further showcasing the concept, which was accompanied by an audio teaser for the lead single "Too Very So Much". On February 10, the company shared a music video teaser. A highlight medley of the mini-album was published on the following day. Myname 2nd Mini Album and the music video for "Too Very So Much" were simultaneously released on February 12. The latter was directed by Lim Seok-jin of Zanybros and features model Kim Jin-kyung as the love interest. Chaejin made an offer to Kim for her appearance in the video, which she accepted.

Myname began promoting "Too Very So Much" on weekly music chart shows that same day by performing the song on Mnet's M Countdown. The group made additional performances on KBS2's Music Bank, Munhwa Broadcasting Corporation's (MBC) Show! Music Core, Seoul Broadcasting System's (SBS) Inkigayo, and SBS MTV's The Show. Myname also appeared on You Hee-yeol's Sketchbook to perform the single.

== Commercial performance ==
On the chart dated February 8–14, 2015, Myname 1st Mini Album debuted at number three on South Korea's national Gaon Album Chart. The mini-album shifted 4,569 units domestically by the end of the month. In Japan, it peaked at number 144 on the Oricon Albums Chart.

== Track listing ==
Myname 1st Mini Album
No.	Title	Lyrics	Music	Arrangement	Length
1.	"Too Very So Much" (너무 Very 막; Neomu Very Mak)	BlueBridge	BlueBridge	BlueBridge	3:15
2.	"Broken Watch" (고장난 시계; Gojangnan Sigye)	Park Woo-sang, Seyong, Jun.Q	Park Woo-sang	Park Woo-sang	3:39
3.	"Light" (선물; Seonmul)	ZigZag Note, Mafly, Jun.Q	ZigZag Note	ZigZag Note	4:26
4.	"Reason"	Deephi, Seyong, Jun.Q	ZigZag Note	ZigZag Note	3:38
5.	"MayDay" (메이데이; Meidei)	BlueBridge	BlueBridge	BlueBridge	3:31
6.	"Too Very So Much" (너무 Very 막; Neomu Very Mak) (Inst.)		BlueBridge	BlueBridge	3:15
Total length:					21:44

== Chart ==
Chart (2015)	Peak position
Japanese Albums (Oricon)	144
South Korean Albums (Gaon)	3
