= Myname 1st Single =

Myname single album

Single album by Myname
- Released: June 1, 2012
- Recorded: 2011
- Genre: R&B
- Length: 13:40
- Language: Korean
- Label: H2 Media

Myname chronology
Myname 1st Single (2012)	Myname 2nd Single (2013)

Singles from Myname 1st Single
- 1. "Hello & Goodbye" Released: June 1, 2012

Myname 1st Single is the debut single album by South Korean idol group Myname. It was released on June 1, 2012, by H2 Media and distributed by Kakao M. After releasing its debut single "Message" the previous October, the group focused on developing its musical style in the ensuing months. Following a series of photo and video teasers, Myname 1st Single and its lead single "Hello & Goodbye" were concurrently released. Myname 1st Single peaked at number seven on South Korea's national Gaon Album Chart, shifting over 9,000 units domestically since its release.

== Background and music structure ==
"We wanted to claim music of our own and we became confident as we gradually found ourselves."

—Myname on Myname 1st Single

Myname 1st Single was crafted to demonstrate Myname's diverse musical capacity and its ability to undertake various genres. Speaking of the record, vocalist Gunwoo stated, "It's still too early to tell what our colors are. But there are several opportunities for Myname to find its colors." The group pursued its artistic development over promotional ventures, leading to an eight-month gap between the release of its debut single "Message" and its first single album.

The opening track "Say My Name (Intro)", which incorporates a heartbeat and exudes a "dreamlike" ambience, conveys "beautiful yet melancholy feelings" which characterize the record. It is followed by "Hello & Goodbye", a medium-tempo R&B song. It consists of a "groovy" melody, "heavy" bass, and "deep, somber" vocals. In the lyrics, the narrator requests for his girlfriend to "meet and break up if you love me". He simultaneously suffers between a "new beginning" and the "final goodbye". The song was made along with "Message", but was stored for a future release. "Hello & Goodbye" underwent various rearrangements prior to its release. "Girlfriend" displays a "standout" vocal delivery and "Replay" is a ballad track. Vocalist Insoo explained that the latter describes replaying "old memories" and "holding onto emotions" after a breakup. The closing track "I'll Forget It (Outro)" features vocals by Hwanhee, who wrote the lyrics and recorded his part prior to enlisting in the military in October 2011.

== Release and promotion ==
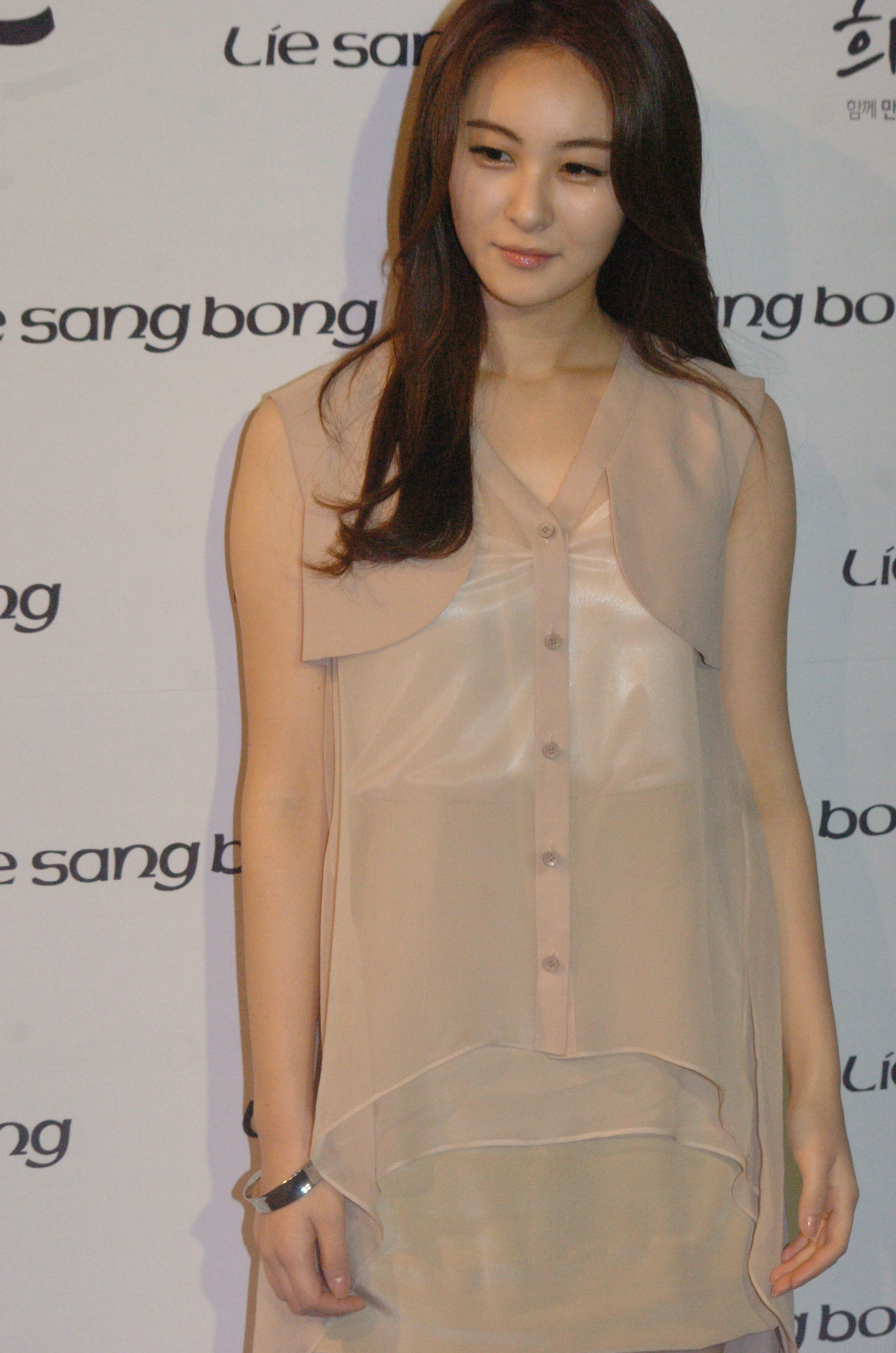
Actress Son Eun-seo (pictured) plays the protagonist's love interest in the music video

H2 Media announced Myname 1st Single and published a music video teaser of the lead single "Hello & Goodbye" on May 21, 2012. Image teasers of members JunQ and Insoo were published two days later. A pair of photos featuring Seyong and Chae-jin were shared the following day. On the subsequent day, the final image teaser for Gunwoo was unveiled. A second music video teaser for the dance version of "Hello & Goodbye" was uploaded on May 29. Myname 1st Album and the music video for "Hello & Goodbye" were simultaneously released on June 1.

Filming for "Hello & Goodbye" occurred on a set in Namyangju, Gyeonggi Province. The music video was directed by Hong Won-ki and it includes scenes recorded in the form of a Korean drama. Main vocalist Gunwoo stars as the protagonist and actress Son Eun-seo plays the love interest. The music video includes choreography sequences that took 24 hour to film; the entire music video was completed in three days and two nights. Myname began promoting "Hello & Goodbye" on weekly music chart shows the day of the album's release by performing the song on KBS2's Music Bank. The group made additional performances on Munhwa Broadcasting Corporation's (MBC) Show! Music Core, Seoul Broadcasting System's (SBS) Inkigayo, Mnet's M Countdown, and MBC Music's Show Champion. Myname also appeared on the entertainment television series Three Wheels and You Hee-yeol's Sketchbook to perform "Hello & Goodbye". Music show promotional performances of "Hello & Goodbye" were completed on July 21.

== Commercial performance ==
On the chart dated May 27 – June 2, 2012, Myname 1st Single debuted at number seven on South Korea's national Gaon Album Chart. According to Gaon Music Chart's year-end report, the single album sold 9,029 copies domestically and ranked at number 152 on its list of best-selling albums.

== Track listing ==
Myname 1st Single
No.	Title	Lyrics	Music	Arrangement	Length
1.	"Say My Name (Intro)"	J.Slow	Koo Ja-kyeong, Lee Ho-seung	Koo Ja-kyeong, Lee Ho-seung	1:26
2.	"Hello & Goodbye"	Koo Ja-kyeong, Lee Ho-seung	Koo Ja-kyeong, Lee Ho-seung	Koo Ja-kyeong, Lee Ho-seung	3:20
3.	"Replay"	Koo Ja-kyeong, Lee Ho-seung	Koo Ja-kyeong, Lee Ho-seung	Koo Ja-kyeong, Lee Ho-seung	3:50
4.	"Girlfriend"	Urban Cllasik	Lee Gyeong-bong, Urban Cllasik	Lee Gyeong-bong, Urban Cllasik	3:23
5.	"I'll Forget It (Outro)" (잊을게...; Ijeulge) (with Hwanhee)	Hwanhee	Lee Chi-woo	Lee Chi-woo	1:41
Total length:					13:40

== Chart ==
Chart (2012)	Peak position
South Korean Albums (Gaon)	7
