= Sugar (South Korean group) =

South Korean girl group

- Genres: K-pop; J-pop
- Years active: 2001–2006
- Labels: Starworld (South Korea); Toy's Factory (Japan)
- Past members: Ahyoomee; Hye Seung; Lee Ha-rin; Hwang Jung-eum; Park Soo-jin

Sugar (Hangul: 슈가, Japanese: シュガー) was a South Korean girl group formed by Starworld in 2001. The group's final lineup was composed of Ahyoomee, Hye Seung and Lee Ha-rin.

During their career, the group saw moderate success in the Korean music market and released multiple songs in Japan. Sugar's Japanese singles "Take It Shake It" and "Real Identity" were notably the theme songs for Kaleido Star.

The group officially disbanded after their contract with Starworld expired in December 2006, while only Ahyoomee maintained her career with Starworld until 2007 before transferring to the Starworld's affiliated label SM Entertainment.

== History ==
The company that formed Sugar, Starworld was a company founded in 1997 by Lee Soo-Young, the member of the South Korean group "Runway" (활주로; Hwaljuro) and father of the South Korean-American singer Sunny. Sugar made their first public appearance on music show in December 2001 with the pre-debut single "Sweet Love". The group later released their debut album, Tell Me Why, with the single "Tell Me Why" on March 13, 2002. Sugar was most compared by fans to the female groups M.I.L.K. and Shinvi for their similar musical styles and images. Many girl groups during this time only released a debut album before leaving the music market. However, Sugar returned in 2003 with the release of their second album, Shine on June 18. Member Sae Byul changed her stage name to Hye Seung (her real name) ahead of their comeback.

Sugar made their official debut in Japan with the release of their first album titled Double Rainbow, with the first single "Go the Distance" on February 4, 2004. They released the single〈All my loving / Cherry Blossom Train (Sakura 列車)〉and〈Wind and Flowers (Wind and Flowers) / Present / Heart & Soul〉Subsequently, in March and July, they were used as the soundtrack of the anime Kaleido Star. The singles and album all charted and were met with moderate success.

Sugar released their 2.5th Korean album titled Secret on October 6, 2004. After the release, member Jung Eum decided to leave the group and pursue a solo career in December 2004. Following Jung Eum's departure, new member Lee Harin was added to the group to replace Jung Eum's position in January 2005. With the new line-up, Sugar released their fourth Japanese single, a ballad titled "Heartful" on February 16. Six months later, Sugar released their fifth Japanese single titled "Sunflower / LOVEACCELE". It was able to reach #29 on the Oricon and remained on the charts for 7 weeks.

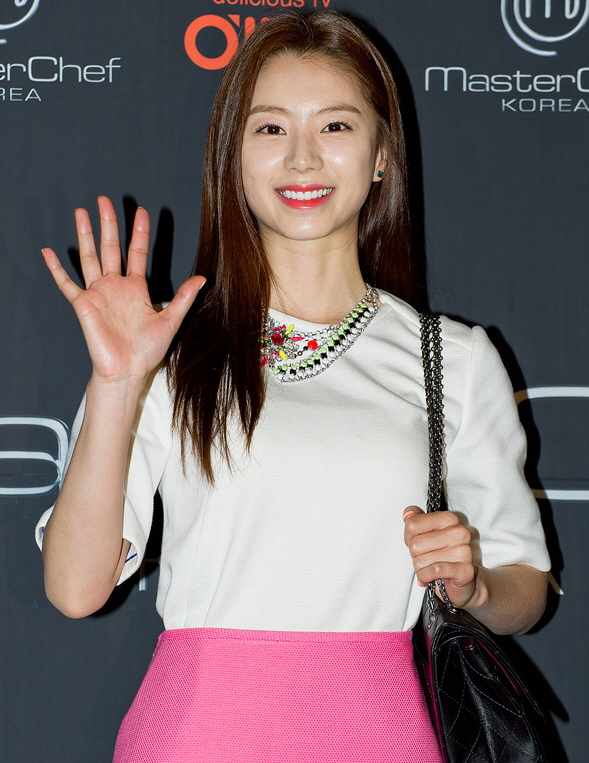
Park Soo-jin

Sugar released their third Korean album, Sweet Lips in September 2005. In the same year, they released their second Japanese album, COLORS 4 WISHES on November 2. Member Soo Jin then announced her departure from Sugar to pursue an acting career in May 2006. Following her departure, Sugar released a DVD entitled "7 STARS", which contained all of their Japanese music videos. In July 2006, member Ahyoomee began her career as solo singer but remained with the group. Sugar remained in their hiatus and reported that they would add a new member to replace Soo Jin.

On December 20, 2006, their contract with Starworld expired and it was announced through KBS World Radio that the group had disbanded. It was stated that each of the current members wanted to embark on solo careers and that the company decided not to renew their contract with the members. Ahyoomee continued under Starworld to pursue a solo career before transferring to Starworld affiliated label SM Entertainment. Hye Seung planned to become an actress, while Harin aimed to begin a music career in Japan.

== Members ==
- Ahyoomee (December 2001–December 2006)
- Hye Seung (December 2001–December 2006)
- Lee Ha-rin (January 2005–December 2006)
- Park Soo-jin (December 2001–May 2006)
- Hwang Jung-eum (December 2001–December 2004)

== Discography ==
=== Studio albums ===
Title	Album details	Peak chart positions		Sales
Title	Album details	KOR	JPN	Sales
Korean
Tell Me Why	Released: March 13, 2002; Label: Starworld; Format: CD, cassette	—	—	
Shine	Released: June 16, 2003; Label: Starworld; Format: CD, cassette	19	—	KOR: 36,899
Sweet Lips	Released: September 22, 2005; Label: Starworld; Format: CD, cassette	21	—	KOR: 7,806
Japanese
Double Rainbow	Released: February 4, 2004; Label: Toy's Factory; Format: CD, cassette	—	—	
Colors 4 Wishes	Released: November 14, 2005; Label: Toy's Factory; Format: CD, cassette	—	138	
"—" denotes album did not chart.

=== Single albums ===
Title	Album details	Peak chart positions	Sales
Title	Album details	KOR	Sales
Secret	Released: October 6, 2004; Label: Starworld; Format: CD	25	KOR: 5,148

=== Singles ===
Title	Year	Peak chart positions	Album
Title	Year	JPN	Album
"Go The Distance"	2004	—	Double Rainbow
"All My Loving / サクラ列車"	2004	40	Double Rainbow
"風と花束 / Present / Heart & Soul"	2004	32	Colors 4 Wishes
"Heartful"	2005	—	Colors 4 Wishes
"ひまわり / Loveaccele"	2005	29	Colors 4 Wishes
"—" denotes single did not chart.

== Awards ==
Year	Awards
2002	SBS Music Awards: Choice Award
2004	SBS Music Awards: Best Dance Award
2004	Mnet Asian Music Awards: Best Female Video
