= Change Myself (song) =

- Album Change Myself cover

Single by Iconiq

from the album Change Myself
- Released: March 3, 2010
- Genre: J-pop, R&B
- Length: 4:05
- Label: Rhythm Zone
- Songwriter: Hiro
- Producer: Hiro

Iconiq singles chronology
"I'm Lovin' You" (2010)	"Change Myself" (2010)	"Bye Now!" (2010)

"Change Myself" is a song recorded by Japanese-born South Korean singer Iconiq, for her first album, Change Myself. The song was central to much of the album's promotion, such as its use in commercials for Shiseido's Maquillage cosmetics range. The song's lyrics influenced the change theme to Iconiq's debut. The song was somewhat successful in the digital market, peaking at #1 on Recochoku's weekly ringtone ranking chart. However, the song only received moderate success as a full-length download, peaking at #20 on RIAJ's Digital Track Chart.

== Release ==
The song was first released as a ringtone on January 20, 2010. A 1:39 edit of the song was released as B-side on Iconiq's "I'm Lovin' You" rental single, on January 27, 2010. A shorter edited version of the song was released as a digital download to cellphones on March 3, 2010, with the full-length version released simultaneously in cellphone and PC digital stores on March 31, 2010.

The song appears on both Iconiq's debut album Change Myself, released March 10, 2010, and on her debut extended play, Light Ahead, released September 15, 2010.

== Writing ==
The song is a mid-tempo R&B song, written by Hiro of Digz, inc. The lyrics describe a woman who has just come out of a relationship, whose only escape from sadness and reality is the MP3s she plays. She decides that she will not "live for nobody else but me" and changes things about herself. According to Iconiq, the song tries to express the message "From now I'll keep trying, and walk forward."

Because Iconiq and her team believed the song's message was strong, "Change Myself" also became the title of Iconiq's debut album. Furthermore, the lyrics of the song, such as the chorus line "no datte yes ni kaete ikeru" (NOだってYESに変えて行ける, If it's a no, I'll change it to a yes.), became the basis for concepts and catch phrases that were the centre of promotion around the album.

== Promotion ==
The song was announced in a press conference on 19 January, which announced the song as being used for Shiseido's Maquillage cosmetics range. Iconiq's debut digital single "I'm Lovin' You" had been used for the same promotions in late 2009, however these commercials featured Iconiq personally, instead of just using her music. The song was also used in commercials for Recochoku.

During album promotions, Iconiq promoted products from seven different companies simultaneously: All Nippon Airways, US fashion brand Kitson, Italian car manufacturer Maserati, Rhythm Zone, music download site Mu-Mo, Shiseido and Starbucks. Each commercial had two versions: one featuring "Change Myself" as background music, along with versions using "Bye Now!."

Iconiq performed this song as a per of her set at the 2010 A-Nation concerts.

== Music video ==
Iconiq walking against the Tokyo cityscape in the music video.

The music video was directed by Yasuhiko Shimizu. The video begins with grey-scale shots of Iconiq walking through deserted heights of a building in the Tokyo skyline. Interspersed through these shots are scenes of Iconiq posing in fashionable clothing, as if for a photoshoot. The video then focuses on scenes of Iconiq against a shimmering, changing background. The background shows such things as stylised lettering of the song's title and geometric patterns. She poses, or dances like a butterfly against the screen. Eventually, different primary colors are added to the patterns on the screen. The final scene shows Iconiq herself in color.

The music video attempts to express a woman with a strong will.

== Chart rankings ==
Chart	Peak position
Billboard Adult Contemporary Airplay	77
Billboard Japan Hot 100	73
RIAJ Digital Track Chart Top 100: Special edit version	20
RIAJ Digital Track Chart Top 100	34

== Release history ==
"Change Myself"
A sample from the chorus of "Change Myself."

Region	Date	Format
Japan	January 20, 2010	Ringtone
Japan	March 3, 2010	Cellphone download (special edit version)
Japan	March 31, 2010	PC download, cellphone download (full-length version)
