= Park Soo-jin =

South Korean actress (born 1985)

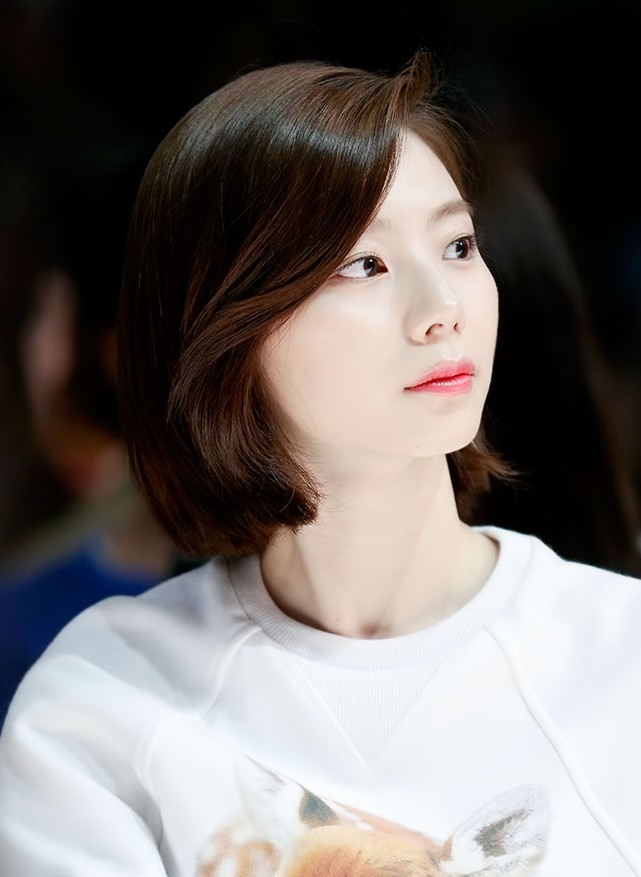
- Park at the 2014 Seoul Fashion Week
- Born: November 27, 1985 (age 40); Seongnam, South Korea
- Education: Kyung Hee University - Modern Music
- Occupations: Actress; singer; model
- Years active: 2001–present
- Agent: KeyEast
- Spouse: Bae Yong-joon (m. 2015)
- Children: 2

Korean name
- Hangul: 박수진
- Hanja: 朴秀真
- RR: Bak Sujin
- MR: Pak Sujin
- Website: Official website

Park Soo-jin (Korean: 박수진; born November 27, 1985) is a South Korean actress, singer and model. She was a member of K-pop girl group Sugar from 2001 to 2006, then she transitioned to acting in 2007. Park has also hosted Tasty Road from 2010 to 2016, a cable show that features trendy restaurants in Seoul.

== Personal life ==
Park married actor and KeyEast chairman Bae Yong-joon on July 27, 2015 at the Sheraton Grande Walkerhill Hotel; they announced their engagement in May 2015. The couple's first child, a boy, was born on 23 October 2016. In August 2017, it was revealed that Park was in the early stages of pregnancy with her second child. Park gave birth to a girl on April 10, 2018.

== Filmography ==
=== Television series ===
Year	Title	Role
2007	Get Karl! Oh Soo-jung	young Oh Soo-jung
2007	The Devil That Pours Red Wine	Ahn Chun-sa
2008	The Art of Seduction	Hee-jin
2008	Our Happy Ending	Hyun-ji
2009	Boys Over Flowers	Cha Eun-jae
2009	Queen Seondeok	young Maya
2009	Loving You a Thousand Times	Oh Nan-jung
2010	My Girlfriend Is a Gumiho	Eun Hye-in
2011	KBS Drama Special: "Cupid Factory"	Si-yoon
2011	Bachelor's Vegetable Store	Jung Dan-bi
2012	My Husband Got a Family	Song Soo-jin
2012	Natural Burials	Ji-hyo
2013	Flower Boys Next Door	Cha Do-hwi
2013	The Blade and Petal	Mo-seol

=== Film ===
Year	Title	Role	Notes
2009	Searching for the Elephant	Ji-na	
2012	Superstar	Soo-jin	
2012	Natural Burials	Ji-hyo	
2013	One Perfect Day	Yoo-jin	short film
2013	48 M	Han Eun-ok	

=== Variety show ===
Year	Title	Notes/Ref.
2010–2015	Tasty Road	Host
2013	Star Beauty Road	

=== Music video appearances ===
Year	Song title	Artist(s)	Co-star
2010	"Goodbye My Love"	J.Rich	U-Know Yunho
2014	"Re;code Episode 5 - I'm in Love"	Ailee, 2LSON	Seo Kang-joon, Dave
