= Myname 2nd Single =

Single album by Myname
- Released: January 25, 2013
- Length: 13:29
- Language: Korean
- Label: H2 Media

Myname chronology
Myname 1st Single (2012)	Myname 2nd Single (2013)	We Are Myname (2013)

Singles from Myname 2nd Single
- 1. "Just That Little Thing" Released: January 25, 2013

Myname 2nd Single is the second single album by South Korean idol group Myname. It was released on January 25, 2013, by H2 Media and distributed by Kakao M. Following a series of photo and video teasers, the album and its lead single "Just That Little Thing" were concurrently released. Myname 2nd Single peaked at number four on South Korea's national Gaon Album Chart, shifting over 14,000 units domestically since its release.

== Background and music structure ==
After concluding domestic promotions for "Hello and Goodbye" (Myname 1st Single, 2012), Myname spent the subsequent months breaking into the Japanese music market. They were featured in a manga series, hosted a cooking program, and held concerts at the end of the year. The group's popularity in Japan outpaced its popularity in their home country. Singer Hwanhee, who formed the group, decided on "Just That Little Thing" to serve as the single for the album. Myname began practicing the choreography for the song during the summer. Due to their constant preparation for live performances, all the members began showing early symptoms of varicose veins.

"Just That Little Thing" infuses electronic and retro music into its sound. The lyrics express a man's inability to break away from a woman he loves, in spite of her constantly being deceitful. Vocalist Gunwoo described the song's addictiveness as "wild". "Dumbfounded" is an R&B song that employs acoustic instruments and synthesizers. JunQ wrote the lyrics for his rap.

== Release and promotion ==
H2 Media announced Myname 2nd Single and published individual teaser photos of the group members on January 14. Directed by Hong Won-ki, a music video teaser for the lead single "Just That Little Thing" was unveiled three days later. A second music video teaser for the dance version music video was uploaded on January 21. Shortly before the release of the physical CD, H2 Media discovered that Psy's "Gangnam Style" was included as the sixth track on Myname 2nd Single. A representative for the label explained that the album was manufactured during the height of the song's popularity, and an error led to "Gangnam Style" being added. As a result, the agency was forced to destroy all 20,000 albums printed and produce them again.

Myname 2nd Single and the music video for "Just That Little Thing" were simultaneously released on January 25. Myname began promoting "Just That Little Thing" on weekly music chart shows two days later by performing the song on Seoul Broadcasting System's (SBS) Inkigayo. Myname made additional performances on SBS MTV's The Show, Mnet's M Countdown, MBC Music's Show Champion, and KBS2's Music Bank.

== Commercial performance ==
On the chart dated January 27 – February 2, 2013, Myname 2nd Single debuted at number four on South Korea's national Gaon Album Chart. According to Gaon Music Chart's year-end report, the single album sold 14,576 copies domestically and ranked at number 93 on its list of best-selling albums.

== Track listing ==
Myname 2nd Single
No.	Title	Lyrics	Music	Arrangement	Length
1.	"Scream My Name (Intro)"	Galacktika	Crazy Park	Crazy Park	1:01
2.	"Just That Little Thing" (그까짓거; Geukkajitgeo)	Crazy Park	Maboos, Crazy Park	Crazy Park	3:41
3.	"Dumbfounded" (어이없어; Eoi Eopseo)	e.one, JunQ	e.one	e.one	3:22
4.	"Crush on You" (끌리잖아; Kkeullijanha)	Song Yang-ha, Kim Yu-seok, Miffung	Song Yang-ha, Kim Yu-seok	Song Yang-ha, Kim Yu-seok	3:27
5.	"Dream.. (Outro)"	Hwanhee	Lee Chi-woo, Hwanhee	Lee Chi-woo	1:58
Total length:					13:29

== Chart ==
Chart (2013)	Peak position
South Korean Albums (Gaon)	4
