= Message (Myname song) =

- Korean version cover

Single by Myname

from the album We Are Myname
- Language: Korean; Japanese
- Released: October 28, 2011 (Korean version); July 25, 2012 (Japanese version)
- Recorded: 2011 (Korean version); 2012 (Japanese version)
- Genre: Dance
- Length: 3:45 (Korean version); 3:48 (Japanese version)
- Label: H2 Media (Korean version); YM3D (Japanese version)
- Songwriters: Han Sang-won, Ban Hyeong-mun
- Producer: Hwanhee

Myname Korean singles chronology
"Message" (2011)	"Hello & Goodbye" (2012)

Myname Japanese singles chronology
"Message" (2012)	"What's Up" (2012)

"Message" (Korean: 메시지; RR: Mesiji) is a song by South Korean idol group Myname. It is the quintet's domestic debut single and it was released on October 28, 2011, under H2 Media and distributed by LOEN Entertainment. A dance track, the lyrics deal with the narrator's feelings of sending a message to a love interest that goes unanswered. It peaked at number 128 on South Korea's national Gaon Digital Chart, accumulating over 98,000 digital downloads since its release.

Myname re-recorded the song in Japanese and released it as its debut single in Japan on July 25, 2012, under the Yoshimoto Kogyo record label YM3D. It was released in three editions: Limited Editions A and B, and Chara-Ani Web Edition. The single peaked at number 14 on the country's weekly national Oricon Singles Chart, selling over 17,000 physical copies by the end of its chart run. "Message" was included in the group's debut Japanese album We Are Myname (2013).

== Background and composition ==
On July 30, 2011, Fly to the Sky member Hwanhee announced his intention to debut a five-member boy group between September and October of that year. Referred to as "Hwanhee Boys", he acted as the quintet's vocal trainer and record producer. Hwanhee had the members train together for two years and three months with the intention of molding a "trendy group" capable of singing various styles and genres including balladry, dance, R&B, and hip hop.

"Message" was written, composed, and arranged by Han Sang-won and Ban Hyeong-mun. Described as a "dynamic" dance song, the lyrics deal with the anxiety the narrator feels after sending his love interest a message "full of emotions" and not receiving a response.

In 2012, Myname was signed to Japanese entertainment conglomerate Yoshimoto Kogyo. In doing so, the group became the first South Korean music act to sign under the company in its 100-year history. The group was placed under the newly formed record label YM3D, and it re-recorded "Message" in Japanese to serve as its introductory single in Japan.

== Release and promotion ==
Myname's debut came at the heels of the "idol flood". In order to draw attention to its debut, each member was revealed individually. Upon the announcement of the quintet's debut, Se-yong was simultaneously introduced as the first member. On September 2, In-soo was unveiled as the second member. "Myname" was confirmed as the group's name on September 21, along with JunQ as the third member. On October 5, Chae-jin and Gun-woo were reported at the final two members of the lineup.

On October 17, jacket photos for each member were released. A music video teaser for "Message" was uploaded on YouTube on October 27. Later that day, Myname made its debut live performance with "Message" on Mnet's music chart show M Countdown. The single and its music video were concurrently released on the following day. Myname continued promoting the song in subsequent performances on Korean Broadcasting System's (KBS) Music Bank, Seoul Broadcasting System's (SBS) Inkigayo, and Munhwa Broadcasting Corporation's (MBC) Show! Music Core.

The music video for the Japanese version of "Message" was uploaded on June 22, 2012. An additional video for the coupling track "Summer Party" was also uploaded on July 6. The single was released on July 25 in three editions: Limited Edition A with bonus DVD content that includes the music video and making film of "Message"; Limited Edition B with bonus DVD content that includes the music video and making film of "Summer Party"; and Chara-Ani Web Edition. The track was used as the ending theme song for Fuji TV's program Hey! Hey! Hey! Music Champ from August to September. "Message" was included in the group's debut Japanese studio album We Are Myname (2013).

== Commercial performance ==
On the chart dated October 23–29, 2011, "Message" debuted at number 203 on South Korea's national Gaon Digital Chart, selling 24,942 downloads in its first week. The following week, it rose to its peak at number 128, shifting an additional 57,107 units. By its third week, the single accumulated 98,348 downloads domestically.

On the issue dated August 6, 2012, the Japanese version of "Message" debuted at number 14 on Japan's national Oricon Singles Chart, selling 12,433 copies in its first week of release. According to Oricon, the single charted for five weeks and sold 17,630 copies in the country by the end of its run. The song also ranked at number 21 on the Billboard Japan Top Singles Sales chart.

== Track listing ==
=== Korean version ===
Track listing
No.	Title	Lyrics	Music	Arrangement	Length
1.	"Message" (메시지; Mesiji)	Han Sang-won, Ban Hyeong-mun	Han Sang-won, Ban Hyeong-mun	Han Sang-won, Ban Hyeong-mun	3:45
2.	"Message" (메시지; Mesiji) (Inst.)		Han Sang-won, Ban Hyeong-mun	Han Sang-won, Ban Hyeong-mun	3:45
Total length:					7:30

=== Japanese version ===
Limited Edition A
No.	Title	Writer(s)	Length
1.	"Message" (Japanese ver.)	Hiro, Han Sang-won, Ban Hyeong-mun	3:48
2.	"Summer Party"	Sty, Lee McCutcheon	3:43
3.	"I Want To"	Hiro, Jörgen Elofsson, Fredrik Thomander	3:17
4.	"Message" (Japanese ver.) (off vocal ver.)	Hiro Han Sang-won, Ban Hyeong-mun	3:44
5.	"Summer Party" (off vocal ver.)	Sty, Lee McCutcheon	3:40
6.	"I Want To" (off vocal ver.)	Hiro, Jorgen Elofsson, Fredrik Thomander	3:12
Total length:			21:24

Limited Edition A — bonus DVD content
No.	Title	Length
1.	"Message" (Japanese ver.) (music video)
2.	"Message" (Japanese ver.) (making video)

Limited Edition B
No.	Title	Writer(s)	Length
1.	"Message" (Japanese ver.)	Hiro, Han Sang-won, Ban Hyeong-mun	3:48
2.	"Summer Party"	Sty, Lee McCutcheon	3:43
3.	"Everlastin' Luv"	Hiro, Lindy Robbins, Andreas Romdhane, Josef Larossi	3:43
4.	"Message" (Japanese ver.) (off vocal ver.)	Hiro, Han Sang-won, Ban Hyeong-mun	3:44
5.	"Summer Party" (off vocal ver.)	Sty, Lee McCutcheon	3:40
6.	"Everlastin' Luv" (off vocal ver.)	Hiro, Lindy Robbins, Andreas Romdhane, Josef Larossi	3:40
Total length:			22:18

Limited Edition B — bonus DVD content
No.	Title	Length
1.	"Summer Party" (music video)
2.	"Summer Party" (making video)

Chara-Ani Web Edition
No.	Title	Writer(s)	Length
1.	"Message" (Japanese ver.)	Hiro, Han Sang-won, Ban Hyeong-mun	3:48
2.	"Summer Party"	Sty, Lee McCutcheon	3:43
3.	"Message" (Japanese ver.) (off vocal ver.)	Hiro, Han Sang-won, Ban Hyeong-mun	3:44
4.	"Summer Party" (off vocal ver.)	Sty, Lee McCutcheon	3:40
Total length:			14:55

== Charts ==
Korean version
Chart (2011)	Peak position
Gaon Digital Chart	128

Japanese version
Chart (2012)	Peak position
Billboard Japan Top Singles Sales	21
Oricon Singles Chart	14
