= Myname 1st Mini Album =

EP by Myname
- Released: July 4, 2013
- Genre: Dance
- Length: 22:24
- Language: Korean
- Label: H2 Media

Myname chronology
We Are Myname (2013)	Myname 1st Mini Album (2013)	Myname 3rd Single Album (2013)

Singles from Myname 1st Mini Album
- 1. "Baby I'm Sorry" Released: July 4, 2013

Myname 1st Mini Album is the first mini-album by South Korean idol group Myname. It was released on July 4, 2013, by H2 Media and distributed by Kakao M. Following a series of photo and video teasers, the album and its lead single "Baby I'm Sorry" were concurrently released. Myname 1st Mini Album topped South Korea's national Gaon Album Chart, shifting over 35,000 units domestically since its release.

== Music structure ==
Myname 1st Mini Album opens with "Baby I'm Sorry", a dance number about "handling the pain of a breakup". The track infuses a piano melody with an electronic rhythm. Myname dedicated "You're the One" to their fans. "Luv Taker" is an electronic song.

== Release and promotion ==
H2 Media published a teaser photo of the group members on June 25, 2013. On July 1, a one-minute and thirty-second music video teaser was uploaded. Myname 1st Mini Album was released on July 4. The music video for "Baby I'm Sorry" was set to be published concurrently, but was delayed by six hours due to being erroneously dated 2012. With a running time exceeding seven minutes and 30 seconds, the video's processing stalled its completion. Following its release, Myname's official website crashed twice due to the large influx of traffic. It garnered 1.2 million views on YouTube 12 hours after its publication.

Directed by Hong Won-ki, filming for the music video of "Baby I'm Sorry" took place in Busan. It was recorded over a period of five days beginning on June 18 and was shot to emulate the film Friend (2001). It stars Myname, actor Yu Oh-seong, and martial artists Yoshihiro Akiyama and Dong Hyun Kim. Over 100 extras were employed for the music video. The footage yielded a product lasting over one hour and video production cost totaled ₩500,000,000 ($456,682). Due to its violent content, the music video and its teaser were rated R19 and labeled inappropriate for viewing by minors. H2 Media also produced a 30-minute short film and entered it to a film festival.

Myname began promoting "Baby I'm Sorry" on weekly music chart shows that same day by performing the song on Mnet's M Countdown. The group made additional performances on Munhwa Broadcasting Corporation's (MBC) Show! Music Core, KBS2's Music Bank, Seoul Broadcasting System's (SBS) Inkigayo, and MBC Music's Show Champion.

== Commercial performance ==
On the chart dated July 7–13, 2013, Myname 1st Mini Album debuted at number one on South Korea's national Gaon Album Chart. According to album sales aggregator Hanteo Chart, the mini-album sold 22,000 copies in its first week. On Gaon Music Chart's year-end report, the mini-album sold 35,490 copies domestically and ranked at number 53 on its list of best-selling albums.

== Track listing ==
Myname 1st Mini Album
No.	Title	Lyrics	Music	Arrangement	Length
1.	"Baby I'm Sorry"	Crazy Park, Peter Pan	Crazy Park, Peter Pan	Crazy Park	3:42
2.	"In My Place"	Roxta	Roxta	Roxta	4:01
3.	"Let Me Cry"	Kei Lim, Kim Chang-rak	Kei Lim, Kim Chang-rak	Kei Lim	3:33
4.	"You're the One" (그래 바로 너야; Geurae Baro Neoya)	e.one, VanAn	e.one	e.one	4:14
5.	"Luv Taker"	VanAn	e.one	e.one	3:12
6.	"Baby I'm Sorry" (Inst.)		Crazy Park, Peter Pan	Crazy Park	3:42
Total length:					22:24

== Chart ==
Chart (2013)	Peak position
South Korean Albums (Gaon)	1

== Release history ==
Region	Date	Format(s)	Label	Ref.
Various	July 4, 2013	Digital download	H2 Media; Kakao M	
South Korea	July 9, 2013	CD	H2 Media; Kakao M	
