= Shirayuki (song) =

- Web Edition cover

Single by Myname

from the album Five Stars
- Language: Japanese
- Released: November 20, 2013
- Length: 4:54
- Label: YM3D
- Songwriters: INP; Lensei; Zen Nishizawa

Myname singles chronology
"Just That Little Thing" (2013)	"Shirayuki" (2013)	"F.F.Y" (2014)

"Shirayuki" is a song by South Korean idol group Myname. It was released on November 20, 2013, as its third Japanese single under YM3D. Written by INP, Lensei, and Zen Nishizawa, it is the quintet's first ballad released as a single in the country.

"Shirayuki" was released in three editions: Web Edition, and Limited Editions A and B. It peaked at number seven on Japan's weekly national Oricon Singles Chart, selling over 28,000 physical copies by the end of its chart run. The song was included in the group's second Japanese album Five Stars (2014).

== Composition ==
"Shirayuki" was written by INP, Lensei, and Zen Nishizawa. A winter song, it is Myname's first sad piano ballad released as a single in Japan. "Sha La La" is a medium-tempo track which consists of a guitar riff. A "strong" and "catchy" dance song, "Baby I'm Sorry" compromises a piano and electronic music. "Miracle" is a dance song, while EDM is integrated into "Zoom Zoom".

== Release and promotion ==
"Shirayuki" was first announced on September 21, 2013, with a scheduled release date of November 20. Leading up to its release, the short version of the music video for the song was uploaded on YouTube on October 18, with the full version being unveiled on November 5. The title track was made available on online music stores on November 13. It was used as the theme song for the group's first film Shinokubo Story (2013).

"Shirayuki" was released in three editions: Web Edition; Limited Edition A with bonus DVD content that includes the music video and making film of the title track; and Limited Edition B with bonus DVD content that includes the music video of "Sha La La". The title track was included in the group's second Japanese studio album Five Stars (2014).

== Commercial performance ==
On the issue dated December 2, 2012, "Shirayuki" debuted at number seven on Japan's national Oricon Singles Chart, selling 25,263 copies in its first week of release. According to Oricon, the single charted for three weeks and sold 28,200 copies in the country by the end of its run. The song also ranked at number 98 on the Billboard Japan Hot 100 chart.

== Track listing ==
Web Edition
No.	Title	Writer(s)	Length
1.	"Shirayuki"	INP, Lensei, Zen Nishizawa	4:54
2.	"Sha La La"	INP, DCP, Zen Nishizawa	4:08
3.	"Baby I'm Sorry" (Japanese ver.)	Ayumu Takeuchi, Crazy Park	3:40
4.	"Shirayuki" (off vocal ver.)	INP, Lensei, Zen Nishizawa	4:54
5.	"Sha La La" (off vocal ver.)	INP, DCP, Zen Nishizawa	4:07
Total length:			21:43

Limited Edition A
No.	Title	Writer(s)	Length
1.	"Shirayuki"	INP, Lensei, Zen Nishizawa	4:54
2.	"Sha La La"	INP, DCP, Zen Nishizawa	4:08
3.	"Miracle"		3:30
4.	"Shirayuki" (off vocal ver.)	INP, Lensei, Zen Nishizawa	4:54
5.	"Sha La La" (off vocal ver.)	INP, DCP, Zen Nishizawa	4:08
6.	"Miracle" (off vocal ver.)		3:30
Total length:			25:03

Limited Edition A — bonus DVD content
No.	Title	Length
1.	"Shirayuki" (music video)
2.	"Shirayuki" (making video)

Limited Edition B
No.	Title	Writer(s)	Length
1.	"Shirayuki"	INP, Lensei, Zen Nishizawa	4:54
2.	"Sha La La"	INP, DCP, Zen Nishizawa	4:08
3.	"Zoom Zoom"	Hiro, Adam Kapit	3:15
4.	"Shirayuki" (off vocal ver.)	INP, Lensei, Zen Nishizawa	4:54
5.	"Sha La La" (off vocal ver.)	INP, DCP, Zen Nishizawa	4:08
6.	"Zoom Zoom" (off vocal ver.)		3:15
Total length:			24:33

Limited Edition B — bonus DVD content
No.	Title	Length
1.	"Sha La La" (music video)

== Charts ==
Chart (2012)	Peak position
Billboard Japan Hot 100	98
Oricon Singles Chart	7
