= Japanese destroyer Shirayuki =

At least three warships of Japan have borne the name Shirayuki:

- Japanese destroyer Shirayuki (1906), a Kamikaze-class destroyer launched in 1906 and scrapped in 1928
- Japanese destroyer Shirayuki (1928), a Fubuki-class destroyer launched in 1928 and sunk in 1943
- JS Shirayuki, a Hatsuyuki-class destroyer launched in 1982 and decommissioned in 2016
