= Myname 3rd Single Album =

Myname single album

Single album by Myname
- Released: October 11, 2013
- Length: 14:00
- Language: Korean
- Label: H2 Media

Myname chronology
Myname 1st Mini Album (2013)	Myname 3rd Single Album (2013)	Five Stars (2014)

Singles from Myname 3rd Single Album
- 1. "Day by Day" Released: October 11, 2013

Myname 3rd Single Album is the third single album by South Korean idol group Myname. It was released on October 11, 2013, by H2 Media and distributed by Kakao M. Following a series of photo and video teasers, the album and its lead single "Day by Day" were concurrently released. Myname 3rd Single Album peaked at number eight on South Korea's national Gaon Album Chart, shifting over 11,000 units domestically since its release.

== Music structure ==
Myname 3rd Single Album opens with "Intro (It's Gonna Be Alright)", a "sweet" slow jam with an undercurrent of electronic music. It is followed by "Day by Day", a medium-tempo hip hop-R&B track. It employs an electric piano with guitar riffs over an "intense" beat. The song was written by rapper D.O and features his vocals, marking his first collaboration with an idol group. The song intends to highlight the rappers of the group. "Memory" is a piano ballad backed by an orchestra. Written by e.one, "U-Turn" integrates a harp and the rap verses were written by members Jun.Q and Seyong. The closing track "Outro (Goodbye)" infuses a hip-hop beat with an electronic rhythm.

== Release and promotion ==
On September 23, 2013, H2 Media announced Myname 3rd Single Album and separate release dates for the availability on online music stores and CDs. A group teaser photo was published four days later. On October 8, a music video teaser of the lead single "Day by Day" was shared. The scenes were shot using the motion control technique to replicate Myname and D.O. It was filmed on an antique-like set in Namyangju on September 28.

Myname began promoting "Day by Day" on weekly music chart shows prior to the release of the single album by performing the song on SBS MTV's The Show and MBC Music's Show Champion. Myname 3rd Single Album and the music video for "Day by Day" were simultaneously released on October 11. The group made additional performances on KBS2's Music Bank, Seoul Broadcasting System' (SBS) Inkigayo, and Munhwa Broadcasting Corporation's (MBC) Show! Music Core.

== Commercial performance ==
On the chart dated October 13–19, 2013, Myname 3rd Single Album debuted at number eight on South Korea's national Gaon Album Chart. According to Gaon Music Chart's year-end report, the single album sold 11,312 copies domestically and ranked at number 123 on its list of best-selling albums.

== Track listing ==
Myname 3rd Single Album
No.	Title	Lyrics	Music	Arrangement	Length
1.	"Intro (It's Gonna Be Alright)"	Lee Hyun-do, TKO, Eniac	Lee Hyun-do, Eniac	Lee Hyun-do, Eniac	1:34
2.	"Day by Day" (featuring D.O)	Lee Hyun-do, TKO, Eniac	Lee Hyun-do, Eniac	Lee Hyun-do, Eniac	3:59
3.	"Memory" (지울 수 없는; Jiul Su Eomneun)	Lee Hyun-do, TKO, Eniac	Lee Hyun-do, Eniac	Lee Hyun-do, Eniac	3:59
4.	"U-Turn"	e.one, Jun.Q, Seyong	e.one	e.one	3:19
5.	"Outro (Goodbye)"	Lee Hyun-do, TKO, Eniac	Lee Hyun-do, Eniac	Lee Hyun-do, Eniac	1:09
Total length:					14:00

== Chart ==
Chart (2013)	Peak position
South Korean Albums (Gaon)	8

== Release history ==
Region	Date	Format(s)	Label	Ref.
Various	October 11, 2013	Digital download	H2 Media; Kakao M	
South Korea	October 14, 2013	CD	H2 Media; Kakao M	
