= I'm Lovin' You =

Single by Iconiq x Exile Atsushi

from the album Change Myself
- B-side: "Change Myself (Short Version)"
- Released: January 27, 2010
- Genre: J-pop, R&B
- Length: 3:31
- Label: Rhythm Zone
- Songwriters: Michico, T. Kura
- Producers: Michico, T. Kura

Iconiq singles chronology
"Jalmotdwin Mannam" (2006)	"I'm Lovin' You" (2010)	"Change Myself" (2010)

"I'm Lovin' You" (stylised as "I'm lovin' you") is a song recorded by Japanese born-South Korean singer Iconiq collaboration with Exile vocalist's Atsushi. It was released on January 27, 2010 as a digital download to cellphones, as well as a special release CD in rental stores, featuring shortened versions of "I'm Lovin' You" and her upcoming digital single, "Change Myself."The single was released as the promotional song for cosmetics line Shiseido's "Maquillage".

== Writing ==
The song is an upbeat R&B song, described in the press as "a love story about the moment when friends become lovers." The lyrics are observations by two different people, who see each other and wish that they were each other's partner. Iconiq and Atsushi collaborated because they wanted to create similar types of music. Atsushi thought a collaboration would be interesting, due to the pair having the same hairstyle.

== Promotion ==
"I'm Lovin' You" was first unveiled in a commercial for Shiseido's Maquillage cosmetics line, featuring actress Juri Ueno, in late November 2009. At the time, large-scale billboard showcasing Iconiq's image began to appear around Japan. The song was released at Recochoku on December the 9th, 2009, where it became the most popular at Recochoku for an entire week, the first time a debut artist has achieved this. By late January, the song had been downloaded as a ringtone approximately 300,000 times.

== Music video ==
Iconiq accessing a holographic memory of Atsushi in the music video.

The music video depicts Iconiq in several white, round futuristic rooms, that are fitted with many technological screens. She uses these screens to access footage of Atsushi, performing the song in a black leather room. She also uses holographic glasses and her cellphone to access similar footage. She also accesses footage of herself in a tiger print costume and masquerade mask on her bed. A prompt comes up on her wall screen, asking if she would like to "delete all memories." She clicks yes, reconsiders and frantically presses cancel, causing the data to be recovered. The final scenes show Iconiq and Atsushi performing the song to each other in front of screens in their own separate rooms (with Iconiq occasionally appearing as an image on Atsushi's screen).

The video was shot in a studio the outskirts of Tokyo in the end of December, 2009. The video was first unveiled on February 24, 2010, at Iconiq's official website, where it was broadcast for only a single week to people who signed up for free membership into Iconiq's online fan club.

== Track listing ==
No.	Title	Writer(s)	Length
1.	"I'm Lovin' You (Short Version)" (Iconiq x Exile Atsushi)	Michico, T. Kura	3:12
2.	"Change Myself (Short Version)"	Hiro	1:39
Total length:			4:51

== Chart rankings ==
"I'm Lovin' You"
A sample from the chorus of "I'm Lovin' You."

Chart	Peak position
RIAJ Digital Track Chart Top 100	8

== Release history ==
Region	Date	Format
Japan	December 9, 2009	Ringtone
Japan	January 27, 2010	Rental CD single, full-length cellphone download
Hong Kong	February 16, 2010	Ringtone
South Korea	February 16, 2010	Ringtone
Taiwan	February 16, 2010	Ringtone
