= Kitson (store) =

Department store chain

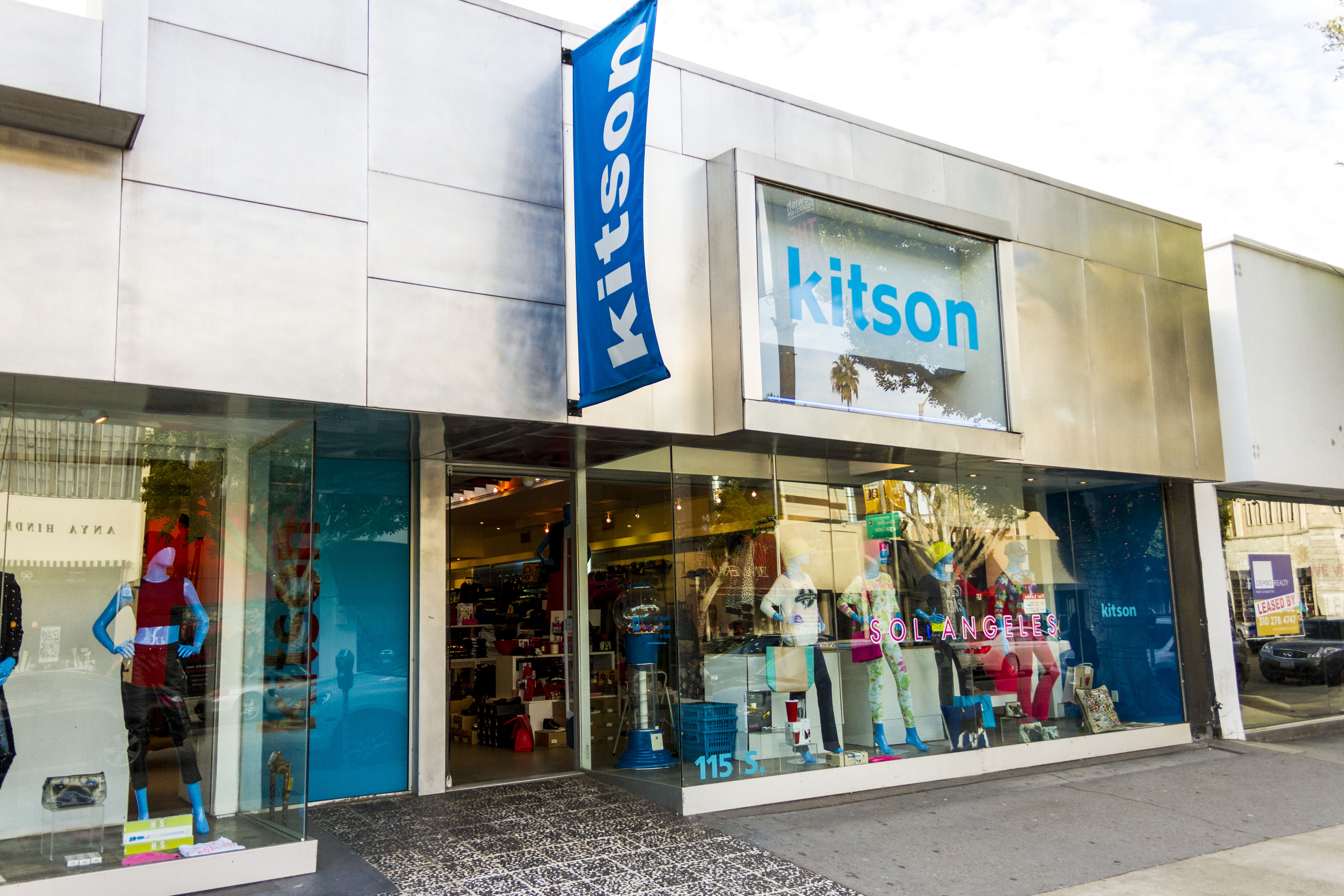
- Kitson Main Store
- Type: Private
- Industry: Retail
- Founded: Los Angeles (2000)
- Founder: Fraser Kitson Ross
- Headquarters: West Hollywood, California, U.S.
- Number of locations: 18
- Key people: Fraser Ross, Founder; Courtney Saavedra, Director of Marketing & PR
- Products: Clothing, jewelry, beauty products, gifts, novelties, books
- Owner: A-List
- Website: kitsonlosangeles.com

Kitson is an upmarket department store chain whose head store is on Robertson Boulevard in Los Angeles, California. This store is well-known for celebrity spotting, especially by paparazzi.

== Company ==
Kitson is a pop culture brand that was established in 2000 on Robertson Boulevard in Los Angeles, California. Kitson has a kids' store called Kitson Kids on Robertson and has other locations in Beverly Hills and the Pacific Palisades.

Kitson has been featured in the movie The Bling Ring and Entourage. The store's 2020 holiday window displays featuring political figures such as Gavin Newsom, Nancy Pelosi, Eric Garcetti as well as others all wearing Santa Hats went viral. Kitson offers exclusive jewelry and accessories by YouTuber HRH Collection, who is also known as Alexandra Peirce. Singer Lana Del Rey reportedly has purchased items from the store.
