= Hiro (music producer) =

Japanese music producer (born 1985)

Hiro (born October 11, 1985) is a Japanese music producer, associated with production company Digz, inc. He began producing songs in 2007, beginning with dance group PaniCrew's single "Growing & Leaning." His most successful song is currently Kumi Koda's "Taboo," which reached #1 on Oricon's single charts in 2008. Other high-profile songs of Hiros include Kumi Koda's "Amai Wana," (甘い罠, Sweet Trap) "Universe" and "Your Love," Namie Amuro's "My Love," BoA's "Best Friend" and Koichi Domoto of KinKi Kids' "Lose Control" (all appearing on albums reaching #1 on Oricon charts).

== Biography ==
From the age of 15, Hiro took an interest in audio editing software. While on an exchange trip to England, he performed in a church choir and worked on making his own album (of which 300 copies were printed). In 2007, after graduating from an Australian university, he moved back to Japan and begun full-time work as a music producer in 2008.

== Production discography ==
Release	Artist	Title	Role	Notes	Album
2007	PaniCrew	"Growing & Leaning"	music, lyrics, track making	Released as single, reached Oricon #64.	—
2007	Tomboy	"Superstar (Hiro Down Under Remix)"	track making	Released on "Superstar" single.	—
2007	Koichi Domoto (KinKi Kids)	"Lose Control"	music, lyrics, track making	Solo track on KinKi Kids album. Oricon #1 album.	Phi
2007	SATOMI'	"It's Just Love"	track making	Misia cover.	Sings (Winter, and Luv)
2008	Kumi Koda	"Amai Wana" (甘い罠, Sweet Trap)	music, track making	Music video filmed, Oricon #1 album.	Kingdom
2008	BoA	"Best Friend"	music, lyrics, track making	Oricon #1 album.	The Face
2008	Yu Yamada	"Leave All Behind"	music, lyrics, track making	Released as single, reached Oricon #77.	Myusic
2008	Yu Yamada	"Holla!"	music, lyrics, track making		Myusic
2008	Yu Yamada	"Block Sign"	music, track making		Myusic
2008	Color	"Share wit' Me"	music, lyrics, track making		Black (A Night for You)
2008	Crystal Kay	"Help Me Out"	music, lyrics, track making		Color Change!
2008	Leah Dizon	"Nothin' to Lose"	music, track making		Communication!!!
2008	Leah Dizon	"Not Too Bad"	music, lyrics, track making		Communication!!!
2008	J Soul Brothers	"Let It Go"	music, lyrics, track making	B-side to "Freakout!" single	J Soul Brothers
2008	Kumi Koda	"Taboo"	music, lyrics, track making	Released as single, reached Oricon #1. Oricon #1 album.	Trick
2009	Sweet Black feat. Maki Goto	"Fly Away"	music, track making	Released as digital single, music video filmed.	Sweet Black
2009	Kumi Koda	"Your Love"	music, lyrics, track making	Oricon #1 album.	Trick
2009	Namie Amuro	"My Love"	music, lyrics, track making	Radio single, Vidal Sassoon CM song. Oricon #1 album.	Past<Future
2010	Kumi Koda	"Can We Go Back (Music Video Extended Version)"	track making	Dance interlude section only.	Universe
2010	Kumi Koda	"Universe"	music, lyrics, track making	Oricon #1 album.	Universe
2010	Vanness	"Little Things You Do"	music, lyrics, track making, back vocals		Reflections
2010	Kana Nishino	"One Way Love"	music, lyrics, track making	Reached #2 on the RIAJ Digital Track Chart.	"Best Friend" (single)
2010	Deep	"Everyday"	music, lyrics, track making		Deep: Brand New Story
2010	Iconiq	"Change Myself"	music, lyrics, track making	Released as digital single, music video filmed.	Change Myself
2010	Choshinsei	"Rock Up"	music, lyrics, track making		"J.P. (Reborn)" (single)
2010	Kana Nishino	"Love Is Blind"	music, track making		"Aitakute Aitakute" (single)
2011	Girls' Generation	"Bad Girl"	lyrics, music, track making		Girls' Generation
2011	Girls' Generation	"Beautiful Stranger"	lyrics, music, track making		Girls' Generation
2011	Girls' Generation	"Let It Rain"	lyrics, music, track making	Lipton CM Song	Girls' Generation
2011	Girls' Generation	"Time Machine"	lyrics, music, track making		The Boys
