= Roy Kim discography =

Discography

- Studio albums: 4
- Singles: 10
- Music videos: 19
- Soundtrack appearances: 4

South Korean singer-songwriter Roy Kim has released three studio albums, 10 singles (including three collaborative songs), and 19 music videos. He has additionally released four soundtracks for television series. Since his first appearance on Mnet's talent competition series Superstar K4, the artist has sold over 12 million digital downloads in South Korea. (Note: The figures listed below are somewhat lower than the actual sales. In general, they are merely the sums of currently available sales numbers counted until the very last week, month, or year each of the albums and tracks charted. The Gaon Music Chart has never officially announced any of the release-to-date sales.)

Before his debut in 2012, Kim applied for Superstar K4. Six of his cover songs were released during the competition, one of which ("Becoming Dust") topped both the Gaon Digital Chart and the now-defunct Billboard Korea K-Pop Hot 100. Kim was crowned the final winner of the show, with his self-written song "Passing By".

Kim's debut single "Bom Bom Bom" became a major hit in the artist's native country, debuting at number one on the Gaon Digital Chart. It eventually remained one of the most successful singles of 2013 in South Korea, with over 1.5 million digital sales according to the Gaon Music Chart. (Note: These figures include that year's sales for "Bom Bom Bom" as the Love Love Love album track.) The song was later included on Kim's first full-length album, Love Love Love (2013), which spawned a top-five hit of the same title. Kim also participated in the soundtrack for Reply 1994 ("Seoul, Here") that year. (Note: "Seoul, Here" is a cover version of the song under the same title, which was used as the theme song for the 1994 television drama series The Moon of Seoul.)

Home (2014), the artist's second studio album, produced a top-five hit of the same name. Following his soundtrack contribution in Pinocchio ("Pinocchio"), Kim released a holiday song called "It's Christmas Day" at the end of the year.

In July 2015, the single "The Way to Meet You" was released as a duo with a female vocalist (Bae Da-hae), for the first time since Kim's debut. It served as a campaign song for mobile puzzle game Pet Rescue Saga. In September, Kim recorded the song "Do Not Love Me" for the soundtrack to Twenty Again. The artist's third studio album, The Great Dipper (2015), was released at the end of that year, spawning an eponymous top-30 single. Kim also collaborated with veteran singer-songwriter Lee Moon-se and Hanhae from hip-hop trio Phantom, on the holiday single "This Christmas".

In 2016, Kim contributed the song "Maybe I" to the soundtrack to Another Oh Hae-young. He also released a cover version of Stefanie Sun's hit song "Cloudy Day", as the first Korean singer to cover a Taiwanese hit in Chinese.

== Studio albums ==
List of studio albums, with selected chart positions and sales figures
Title	Album details	Peak chart positions	Sales
Title	Album details	KOR	Sales
Love Love Love	Released: June 25, 2013; Label: CJ E&M Music; Formats: CD, digital download	3	KOR: 19,900 (Note: Sales figures for Love Love Love as of July 2016.)
Home	Released: October 8, 2014; Label: CJ E&M Music; Formats: CD, digital download	4	KOR: 12,600 (Note: Sales figures for Home as of July 2016.)
The Great Dipper	Released: December 4, 2015; Label: MMO Entertainment, CJ E&M Music; Formats: CD, digital download	8	KOR: 7,200 (Note: Sales figures for The Great Dipper as of July 2016.)
And (그리고)	Released: October 25, 2022; Label: Wake One Entertainment, Genie Music, Stone Music Entertainment; Formats: CD, digital download; Track listing: 1. "It'll Be Alright" (괜찮을거야); 2. "The Black Between the Stars" (그대에게 닿을 때까지); 3. "Take Me Back in Time" (그때로 돌아가); 4. "Bedtime Prayers" (어른으로); 5. "I Should Have" (그냥 그때); 6. "Trust in Time" (시간을 믿어봐); 7. "Hear Me Out" (들어봐); 8. "Well, Tonight" (오늘 밤만큼은); 9. "At Last" (결국엔)	45	KOR: 3,804

== Extended plays ==
List of extended plays, with selected chart positions and sales figures
Title	Album details	Peak chart positions	Sales
Title	Album details	KOR	Sales
Blooming Season	Released: May 16, 2017; Label: MMO Entertainment, CJ E&M Music; Formats: CD, digital download	6	KOR: 5,200

== Singles ==
=== As lead artist ===
List of singles as lead artist, with selected chart positions and sales figures, showing year released and album name
Title	Year	Peak chart positions		Sales (digital downloads)	Certifications (Note: In April 2018, Gaon Chart introduced music recording certifications for albums, downloads and streamings.)	Album
Title	Year	KOR	KOR Hot	Sales (digital downloads)	Certifications	Album
Korean-language
"Passing By" (스쳐간다)	2012	6	9	KOR: 654,000	—N/a	Non-album release
"Bom Bom Bom" (봄봄봄)	2013	1	1	KOR: 1,783,000 (Note: These figures include sales for "Bom Bom Bom" as the Love Love Love album track.)	—N/a	Love Love Love
"Love Love Love"	2013	2	4	KOR: 732,000	—N/a	Love Love Love
"Home"	2014	2	—N/a	KOR: 500,000	—N/a	Home
"It's Christmas Day"	2014	27	—N/a	KOR: 69,000	—N/a	Non-album single
"The Great Dipper" (북두칠성)	2015	30	—N/a	KOR: 308,000	—N/a	The Great Dipper
"Egoist" (이기주의보)	2017	33	—N/a	KOR: 63,741+	—N/a	Blooming Season
"Suddenly" (문득)	2017	17	—N/a	KOR: 78,073+	—N/a	Blooming Season
"Only Then" (그때 헤어지면 돼)	2018	2	2	KOR: 2,500,000+	KMCA: Platinum (Streaming & Download)	Non-album singles
"The Hardest Part" (우리 그만하자)	2018	1	2	—N/a	—N/a	Non-album singles
"Linger On" (살아가는 거야)	2020	73	—	—N/a	—N/a	Non-album singles
"Take Me Back in Time" (그때로 돌아가)	2022	88	—	—N/a	—N/a	And
"It'll Be Alright" (괜찮을거야)	2022	200	—	—N/a	—N/a	And
"When Spring Comes" (봄이 와도)	2024	71	—	—N/a	—N/a	Non-album singles
"If You Ask Me What Love Is" (내게 사랑이 뭐냐고 물어본다면)	2024	12	—	—N/a	—N/a	Non-album singles
"As Is" (있는 모습 그대로)	2025	128	—	—N/a	—N/a	Non-album singles
"No Words Can Say" (달리 표현할 수 없어요)	2025	9	—	—N/a	—N/a	Non-album singles
"Smile Boy"	2026	72	—	—N/a	—N/a	Bloom Again
"Cry Out Loud" (크게 울어라)	2026	162	—	—N/a	—N/a	Non-album single
Note: The Billboard Korea K-Pop Hot 100 was introduced in August 2011 and discontinued in July 2014. In December 2017, the chart was re-established.

=== Collaborations ===
List of collaborative singles, with selected chart positions and sales figures, showing year released and album name
Title	Year	Peak chart positions	Sales (digital downloads)	Album
Title	Year	KOR	Sales (digital downloads)	Album
"Sing a Song" (as part of Superstar K4 Top 12)	2012	80	KOR: 71,000	It's Top 12
"The Way to Meet You" (duet with Bae Da-hae; campaign song for Pet Rescue Saga)	2015	128	KOR: 19,000	Pet Rescue (digital single)
"This Christmas" (Lee Moon-sae and Roy Kim featuring Hanhae of Phantom)	2015	79	KOR: 32,000	New Direction "Winter Special" (digital single)

== Soundtrack appearances ==
List of soundtrack appearances, with selected chart positions and sales figures, showing year released and album name
Title	Year	Peak chart positions		Sales (digital downloads)	Album
Title	Year	KOR	KOR Hot	Sales (digital downloads)	Album
"Seoul, Here" (Jang Cheol-woong cover)	2013	13	22	KOR: 502,000 (Note: These figures include sales for the acoustic version of "Seoul, Here".)	Reply 1994 OST
"Pinocchio"	2014	25	—N/a	KOR: 388,000	Pinocchio OST
"Do Not Love Me"	2015	66	—N/a	KOR: 114,000	Twenty Again OST
"Maybe I"	2016	11	—N/a	KOR: 423,000	Another Oh Hae-young OST
"Heaven" (with Kim EZ (GGot Jam Project))	2017	16	—N/a	KOR: 292,137+	Guardian: The Lonely and Great God OST
"Starlight"	2017	—	—N/a	—	The King in Love OST
"You Belong to My World" (좋겠다)	2017	34	—N/a	KOR:122,498+	While You Were Sleeping OST
"No Longer Mine"	2018	27	—N/a		Familiar Wife OST
"All I Do" (그대만 떠올라)	2019	54	—N/a		Romance Is a Bonus Book OST
"Let's Stay Well" (잘 지내자, 우리)	2023	21	—N/a		My Love OST
"Whenever, Wherever" (그대가 있는 곳, 언제 어디든)	2023	59	—N/a		My Demon OST
"Love Remnants" (미련하다)	2024	— (Note: Love Remnants did not enter the Gaon Digital Chart, but peaked at number 77 on the Download Chart.)	—N/a		Transit Love 3 Part.2 OST
"Run with Me" (도망가자)	2024	114	—N/a		You as a Boy OST
"—" denotes releases that did not chart or were not released in that region. Note: The Billboard Korea K-Pop Hot 100 was introduced in August 2011 and discontinued in July 2014.

== Other appearances ==
List of songs, with selected chart positions and sales figures, showing year released and album name
Title	Year	Peak chart positions		Sales (digital downloads)	Album
Title	Year	KOR	KOR Hot	Sales (digital downloads)	Album
"Becoming Dust" (duet with Jung Joon-young; Lee Mi-ki cover)	2012	1	1	KOR: 2,236,000	Superstar K4 Top 12, Part 1
"Whistle" (Lee Moon-se cover)	2012	10	9	KOR: 1,347,000	Superstar K4 Top 12, Part 2
"Blue Frog" (Psy cover)	2012	22	38	KOR: 384,000	Superstar K4 Top 12, Part 3
"The Moon of Seoul" (Kim Gun-mo cover)	2012	17	29	KOR: 374,000	Superstar K4 Top 12, Part 4
"It's Been a Long Time" (Love & Peace cover)	2012	39	—	KOR: 165,000	Superstar K4 Top 12, Part 5
"October Rain" (Yoon Gun cover)	2012	2	5	KOR: 1,192,000	Superstar K4 Top 12, Part 6
"Creep" (duet with Jung Joon-young; Radiohead cover)	2012	73	—	KOR: 69,000	It's Top 12
"Rustic" (Kang Sung cover)	2015	176	—N/a	KOR: 10,000	Two Yoo Project – Sugar Man, Part 10 (digital single)
"Around Thirty" (Kim Kwang-seok cover)	2016	96	—N/a	KOR: 30,000	Immortal Songs: Singing the Legend (The 20th Anniversary of Kim Kwang-seok's Death, Part 1)
"Please" (as "Romantic the Dark Knight"; Deulgukhwa cover)	2016	102	—N/a	KOR: 32,000	King of Mask Singer Episode 66
"Love Always Runs Away" (as "Romantic the Dark Knight"; Lee Moon-se cover)	2016	107	—N/a	KOR: 33,000	King of Mask Singer Episode 66
"Piled Up with Longing" (as "Romantic the Dark Knight"; Yeojin cover)	2016	65	—N/a	KOR: 40,000	King of Mask Singer Episode 68
"—" denotes releases that did not chart or were not released in that region. Note: The Billboard Korea K-Pop Hot 100 was introduced in August 2011 and discontinued in July 2014.

== Other charted songs ==
List of songs, with selected chart positions and sales figures, showing year released and album name
Title	Year	Peak chart positions		Sales (digital downloads)	Album
Title	Year	KOR	KOR Hot	Sales (digital downloads)	Album
"Let Me Love You"	2013	33	35	KOR: 115,000	Love Love Love
"When You Are Down"	2013	44	—	KOR: 83,000	Love Love Love
"Grandfather's Camera"	2013	61	—	KOR: 66,000	Love Love Love
"Don't Know How"	2013	72	—	KOR: 51,000	Love Love Love
"12 O'Clock"	2013	77	—	KOR: 48,000	Love Love Love
"Follow Me"	2013	79	—	KOR: 48,000	Love Love Love
"Intro (My Forest)"	2013	150	—	KOR: 14,000	Love Love Love
"Nothing Lasts Forever"	2014	59	—N/a	KOR: 55,000	Home
"When Autumn Comes"	2014	79	—N/a	KOR: 44,000	Home
"If You Love Me"	2014	80	—N/a	KOR: 43,000	Home
"Now I Know" (featuring Jung Ji-chan)	2014	86	—N/a	KOR: 39,000	Home
"Hold On"	2014	101	—N/a	KOR: 30,000	Home
"Curtain" (featuring Sungha Jung)	2014	107	—N/a	KOR: 29,000	Home
"Far Away"	2014	111	—N/a	KOR: 29,000	Home
"Thank You"	2014	114	—N/a	KOR: 29,000	Home
"I Want to Love You"	2015	129	—N/a	KOR: 33,000	The Great Dipper
"Stay"	2015	135	—N/a	KOR: 29,000	The Great Dipper
"The Wave"	2015	165	—N/a	KOR: 20,000	The Great Dipper
"Gone with the Wind"	2015	171	—N/a	KOR: 19,000	The Great Dipper
"Remember Me"	2015	191	—N/a	KOR: 17,000	The Great Dipper
"Tear Drops"	2015	219	—N/a	KOR: 13,000	The Great Dipper
"What's Left Behind"	2015	227	—N/a	KOR: 12,000	The Great Dipper
"The Lullaby"	2015	231	—N/a	KOR: 12,000	The Great Dipper
"예뻐서 그래"	2017	81	—N/a	KOR: 31,409	開花期 (개화기)(Blooming Season)
"근데 넌"	2017	–	—N/a	KOR: 17,666	開花期 (개화기)(Blooming Season)
"—" denotes releases that did not chart or were not released in that region. Note: The Billboard Korea K-Pop Hot 100 was introduced in August 2011 and discontinued in July 2014.

== Videography ==
=== Music videos ===
List of music videos, showing year released and director
Title	Year	Artist(s)	Director	Ref.
As lead artist
"Bom Bom Bom"	2013	Roy Kim	Hong Won-ki	
"Love Love Love"	2013	Roy Kim	Hong Won-ki	
"Seoul, Here"	2013	Roy Kim	Unknown	
"Seoul, Here (Acoustic version)"	2013	Roy Kim	Unknown	
"Nothing Lasts Forever" (Lyric video)	2014	Roy Kim	Kwon O-chul	
"Home"	2014	Roy Kim	APRILSHOWER FILM	
"When Autumn Comes"	2014	Roy Kim	APRILSHOWER FILM	
"Pinocchio"	2014	Roy Kim	Unknown	
"It's Christmas Day"	2014	Roy Kim	Kyle	
"Do Not Love Me"	2015	Roy Kim	Unknown	
"The Great Dipper"	2015	Roy Kim	Kwon Soon-wook	
"Stay"	2015	Roy Kim	Song Won-young	
"I Want to Love You"	2015	Roy Kim	Song Won-young	
"Maybe I"	2016	Roy Kim	Unknown	
"Cloudy Day" (Lyric video)	2016	Roy Kim	Unknown	
"Cloudy Day"	2016	Roy Kim	Unknown	
"Suddenly"	2017	Roy Kim	APRILSHOWER FILM	
"Egoist"	2017	Roy Kim	Mustache Film	
"Only Then"	2018	Roy Kim	APRILSHOWER FILM	
"The Hardest Part"	2018	Roy Kim	APRILSHOWER FILM	—N/a
"Linger On"	2020	Roy Kim	APRILSHOWER FILM	
"Take Me Back In Time"	2022	Roy Kim	Kim Minsu (FLIPEVIL)	
"It'll Be Alright"	2022	Roy Kim	Unknown	—
Collaborations
"Sing a Song"	2012	Superstar K4 Top 12	Unknown	
"The Way to Meet You"	2015	Kim and Bae Da-hae	Unknown	
"This Christmas" (Lyric video)	2015	Lee Moon-se and Kim featuring Hanhae	Unknown	
