= List of awards and nominations received by Roy Kim =

Roy Kim awards and nominations
Awards and nominations
Award	Wins	Nominations
Circle Chart Music	2	4
Golden Disc	3	4
MAMA	1	3
APAN Star Awards	1	1
HITO Music Awards	1	1
Korea Best Dresser Swan Awards	1	1
Korea Drama Awards	1	1
Korea Popular Music Awards	1	5
MBC Plus X Genie Music Awards	0	5
Mnet 20's Choice	2	2
Baeksang Arts Awards	0	1
Seoul Music Awards	0	3
Other Awards	2	2

Totals (Note: Certain award groups do not simply award one winner. They acknowledge several different recipients, have runners-up, and have third place. Since this is a specific recognition and is different from losing an award, runner-up mentions are considered wins in this award tally. For simplification and to avoid errors, each award in this list has been presumed to have had a prior nomination.)
- Wins: 16
- Nominations: 31

South Korean singer-songwriter Roy Kim has received 10 awards from 13 nominations since his coronation as the Superstar K4 winner in 2012. He has additionally won a total of five music program awards, with four different songs. Kim is the recipient of a Gaon Chart K-Pop Award, two Golden Disk Awards, a Mnet Asian Music Award, and a HITO Music Award for Favorite Foreign Artist.

== Awards and nominations ==
=== APAN Star Awards ===
Year	Category	Recipient	Result
2015	Best Original Soundtrack	"Pinocchio" (from Pinocchio)	Won

=== Baeksang Arts Awards ===
Year	Category	Recipient	Result
2014	Best Original Soundtrack	"Seoul, Here" (from Reply 1994)	Nominated

=== Gaon Chart K-Pop Awards ===
Year	Category	Recipient	Result
2014	Popular Singer of the Year	Roy Kim (with Jung Joon-young)	Won
2018	Song of the Year - February	"Only Then"	Won
2018	Song of the Year - September	"The Hardest Part"	Nominated
2020	MuBeat Global Choice Award (Male)	Roy Kim	Nominated

=== Golden Disk Awards ===
Year	Category	Recipient	Result
2014	Rookie Artist Award (in Disk Album)	Roy Kim	Won
2014	Popularity Award	Roy Kim	Won
2019	Digital Daesang	"Only Then"	Nominated
2019	Digital Bonsang	"Only Then"	Won

=== Korea Best Dresser Swan Awards ===
Year	Category	Recipient	Result
2014	Rising Star Award	Roy Kim	Won

=== Korea Drama Awards ===
Year	Category	Recipient	Result
2018	Best Original Soundtrack	"No Longer Mine" (Familiar Wife)	Nominated

=== Korean Popular Music Awards ===
Year	Category	Recipient	Result
2018	Bonsang Award	Roy Kim	Won
2018	Popularity Award	Roy Kim	Nominated
2018	Best Artist Award	Roy Kim	Nominated
2018	Best Digital Song	"Only Then"	Nominated
2018	Best Ballad	"Only Then"	Nominated

=== MBC Plus X Genie Music Awards ===
Year	Category	Recipient	Result
2018	Artist of the Year	Roy Kim	Nominated
2018	Song of the Year	"Only Then"	Nominated
2018	Male Artist Award	Roy Kim	Nominated
2018	Vocal Track (Male)	"Only Then"	Nominated
2018	Genie Music Popularity Award	Roy Kim	Nominated

=== Melon Music Awards ===
Year	Category	Recipient	Result
2018	Best Ballad	"Only then"	Won
2018	Song of the Year	"Only then"	Nominated

=== Mnet 20's Choice ===
Year	Category	Recipient	Result
2013	20's Booming Star – Male	Roy Kim	Won
2013	20's Hot Cover Music	Roy Kim (with Jung Joon-young)	Won

=== Mnet Asian Music Awards ===
Year	Category	Recipient	Result
2013	Best New Male Artist	Roy Kim	Won
2014	Best Male Artist	Roy Kim	Nominated
2014	Best Vocal Performance – Male	"Home"	Nominated
2018	Best Male Artist	Roy Kim	Won
2018	Best Vocal Performance – Male	"Only Then"	Nominated
2018	Best OST	"No Longer Mine (Familiar Wife OST)"	Nominated

=== Seoul Music Awards ===
The Seoul Music Awards is an awards show founded in 1990 that is presented annually by Sports Seoul for outstanding achievements in the music industry in South Korea.

Year	Category	Recipient	Result
2019	Bonsang Award	Roy Kim	Nominated
2019	Popularity Award	Roy Kim	Nominated
2019	Hallyu Special Award	Roy Kim	Nominated

== International ==
=== HITO Music Awards ===
Year	Category	Recipient	Result
2015	Favorite Foreign Artist	Roy Kim	Won

== Other Awards ==
Year	Awards	Category	Recipient	Result
2012	Superstar K4	First place Out of 2,083,447 Applicants	Roy Kim	Won
2018	2019 Korea First Brand Awards	Best Male Solo Artist	Roy Kim	Won
