= It's Christmas Day =

Single by Roy Kim
- Released: 19 December 2014
- Recorded: 2014
- Genre: Acoustic; Christmas; folk
- Length: 3:20
- Label: CJ E&M Music
- Songwriter: Kim Sang-woo
- Producers: Ahn Seok-jun (exec.); Jung Ji-chan

Roy Kim singles chronology
"Pinocchio" (2014)	"It's Christmas Day" (2014)	"The Way to Meet You" (2015)

Music video
- "It's Christmas Day" on YouTube

"It's Christmas Day" is a Christmas song by South Korean singer-songwriter Roy Kim. It was released as a digital single on 19 December 2014, and distributed through CJ E&M Music.

== Release ==
"It's Christmas Day" was composed and written by Kim. After taking over spring with "Bom Bom Bom", summer with "Love Love Love", and autumn with "Home", Kim filled all of four seasons with his winter song release. On 11 December 2014, Kim posted up on his official Instagram account, stating "It's gonna be Christmas Day soon. Wait for it. Recording a new song."

The self-penned single was released on 19 December, one day ahead of his year-end concert, "Our Winter #2". Its music video also was revealed at the same day, bringing all kinds of Christmas feels with Kim sweetly singing while playing the piano and guitar. "It's Christmas Day" peaked at number 27 on the Gaon Digital Chart, having sold over 69,000 digital copies as of 3 January 2015.

== Promotion ==
Following its release, Kim performed the song at Mnet's M Countdown broadcast on Christmas Day of that year.

== Track listing ==
All tracks are written by Kim Sang-woo.

No.	Title	Length
1.	"It's Christmas Day"	3:20
Total length:		3:20

== Credits and personnel ==
Credits are adapted from the liner notes of the single's limited CD edition.

Locations

- Recorded at Brewbeat Studio (drum)
- Recorded at Studio 40 (electric guitar)
- Recorded at Musicabal (vocals, keyboard, acoustic guitar, and percussion)
- Recorded at T Studio (strings)
- Mixed at Musicabal
- Mastered at Metropolis Mastering, London

Personnel

- Sang-woo Kim – vocals, lyrics, composer, percussion, backing vocals
- Ji-chan Jung – arranger, acoustic guitar, keyboard, programming, percussion, music producer
- Steve Brewster – drum
- Ken Song – electric guitar
- Hoon Choi – bass
- In-young Bak – arranging of strings
- Yoong String – strings
- Seong-sik Oh – recording of strings
- Kyung-hoon Baek – recording assistant
- Hyun-jung Go – mixing
- Stuart Hawkes – mastering
- Seok-jun Ahn – executive producer

== Charts and sales ==
=== Weekly charts ===
Chart (2014–present)	Peak position
South Korea (Gaon Digital Chart)	27

=== Monthly charts ===
Chart (2014–present)	Peak position
South Korea (Gaon Digital Chart)	71

=== Sales ===
Country	Sales
South Korea (Gaon)	69,000

== Release history ==
Region	Date	Format	Label	Ref.
South Korea	19 December 2014	Digital download	CJ E&M Music	
Worldwide	19 December 2014	Digital download	CJ E&M Music	
