= Passing By =

Passing By may refer to:

== Music ==
=== Albums ===
- Passing By - Songs by Jake Heggie, compilation album by several singers (2010)

=== Songs ===
- "Passing By", song Richard Crooks 1944, to lyrics by Thomas Ford (1580-1648)
- "Passing By" (Beach Boys song)
- "Passing By" (Roy Kim song), 2012
- "Passing By", song by Diana Dors Kluger, Norman Newell 1977
- "Passing By", song by John McCormack, tenor, piano accompaniment by Gerald Moore (words Robert Herrick, music E. C. Purcell (1940)
- "Passing By", song by The Versatiles, 1958
- "Passing By", song by Quicksand

== Other uses ==
- Passing By, a novel by Maurice Baring (1921)
- "Passing By" (Doctors), a 2004 television episode
