= Passing By (Roy Kim song) =

Single by Roy Kim
- Released: November 27, 2012
- Recorded: 2012
- Genre: Rock ballad
- Length: 4:08
- Label: CJ E&M Music
- Songwriter: Kim Sang-woo

Roy Kim singles chronology
"Passing By" (2012)	"Bom Bom Bom" (2013)

"Passing By" (Korean: 스쳐간다; RR: Seucheoganda) is a song by South Korean singer-songwriter Roy Kim. It was released as a digital single on November 27, 2012, and distributed through CJ E&M Music. "Passing By" was the winning song of Mnet's talent competition series Superstar K4.

== Release ==
Four days after winning Superstar K4, Kim's digital single "Passing By" was released. In its first week of release, the song charted in the top 10 of several music portals and charts in South Korea. It peaked at number six on the Gaon Digital Chart, and number nine on the now-defunct Billboard Korea K-Pop Hot 100. As of February 2013, "Passing By" has sold nearly 654,000 digital copies in Kim's native country.

== Promotion ==
As "Passing By" was only released for Superstar K4, it was not heavily promoted. Aside from a performance on Superstar K4, Kim also performed the song at the 14th Mnet Asian Music Awards on November 30, 2012, followed by Mnet's M Countdown on December 13 that same year.

== Track listing ==
All tracks are written by Kim Sang-woo.

No.	Title	Length
1.	"Passing By" (스쳐간다; Seuchyeoganda)	4:08
Total length:		4:08

== Charts and sales ==
=== Weekly charts ===
Chart (2012–present)	Peak position
Billboard Korea K-Pop Hot 100	9
South Korea (Gaon Digital Chart)	6

=== Monthly charts ===
Chart (2012–present)	Peak position
South Korea (Gaon Digital Chart)	20

=== Year-end charts ===
Chart (2012)	Position
South Korea (Gaon Digital Chart)	268

=== Sales ===
Country	Sales
South Korea (Gaon)	654,000

== Release history ==
Region	Date	Format	Label	Ref.
South Korea	November 27, 2012	Digital download	CJ E&M Music	
Worldwide	November 27, 2012	Digital download	CJ E&M Music	
