= Don't Know How =

Don't Know How

- "Don't Know How", song from PartyNextDoor 3
- "Don't Know How", song from Love Love Love (Roy Kim album)
- “Don’t Know How”, song by Ricky Montgomery
