= Sky HD =

Sky HD may refer to:

- Sky+ HD, a high-definition television service provided by British Sky Broadcasting Group in the United Kingdom and Ireland
- Sky HD (Italy), a high-definition television service provided by Sky Italia in Italy
- Sky HD (South Korea), a high-definition television service provided by Korea Broadcasting Corporation in South Korea
