= KT ENA =

South Korean satellite television company

KT ENA Co., Ltd.
- Formerly: SkyTV
- Type: Subsidiary
- Industry: Entertainment; Cable television
- Founded: February 26, 2004; 22 years ago
- Area served: South Korea
- Key people: Yoon Yong-pil (President)
- Owner: KT Skylife : 62.69% KT Studio Genie : 37.31%
- Website: ktena.co.kr/company/

KT ENA (formerly called skyTV) is a South Korean satellite television broadcaster owned by KT SkyLife, a subsidiary of KT Corporation.

== Assets ==
=== Channels operated by KT ENA ===
- ENA: comprehensive drama and entertainment channel (formerly skyDrama, SKY)
- ENA Play: variety channel (formerly skyENT, NQQ)
- ENA Drama: encore drama channel (formerly DramaH)
- ENA Story: women and game channel (formerly Trendy, TrendE)
- OLIFE: lifestyle channel (formerly Channel T)
- skyUHD: 24-hour UHD comprehensive channel
- ONCE: masterpiece curation channel (formerly skyPetpark, which aired pets-related)
- ViKi: premium adult channel
- kidstalktalkplus: children's English education channel
- ENA Sports: sports channel (formerly SkySports, operated by Sky-K, joint venture with K League Federation)

=== Formerly owned by skyTV ===
- sky A&C – life
- skyHealing
- skyICT
