= Sky Sports (South Korean TV channel) =

ENA Sports

Ownership
- Owner: KT ENA (KT Corporation); K League Federation
- Sister channels: ENA; ENA Play; ENA Drama; ENA Story; OLIFE; ONCE; ViKi; Healthmedi; kidstalktalkplus; skyUHD (UHD 4K)

History
- Launched: 1 August 2014
- Replaced: The M
- Former names: SkySports (2014–2025)

ENA Sports (formerly Sky Sports) is a South Korea broadcast channel using the operator KT Skylife TV.

Most recently, the channel was managed by Sky-K, a joint venture between KT ENA and K League Federation.

== Broadcasting rights ==
=== Athletics ===
- World Athletics Championships

=== Badminton ===
- Badminton Asia

=== Football ===
- FIFA ASEAN Cup (2026)
- Women's Super League
- K League 1

=== Tennis ===
- Billie Jean King Cup
- ITF Davis Cup
- ATP Challenger Showcase
- ATP United Cup

=== Volleyball ===
- Asian Volleyball Confederation
- FIVB

=== Water sports ===
- World Aquatics Championships
