= WareValley =

South Korean software manufacturer

WareValley Co., Ltd.
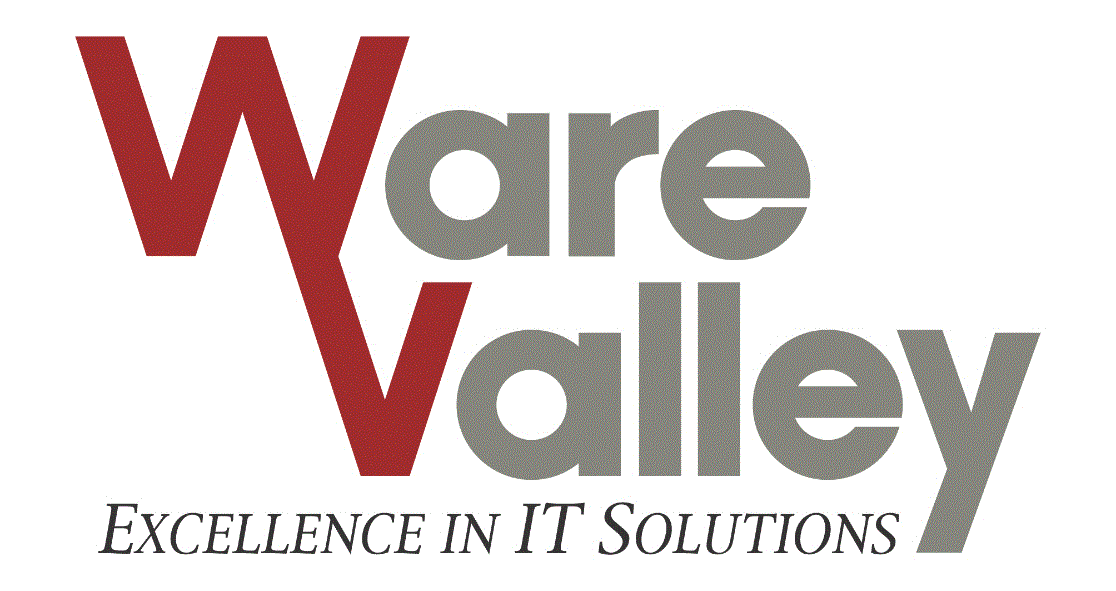
- Founded: 2001
- Headquarters: Seoul, South Korea
- Key people: Son Sam-soo (Chairman)
- Products: Database Management / Security
- Subsidiaries: WareValley Japan (Japan)
- Website: warevalley.com

WareValley is a software manufacturer headquartered in Seoul, South Korea.

== Structure ==
WareValley's head office is located in Seoul, South Korea. It also operates a branch office in Tokyo, Japan, which opened in the end of 2012. WareValley has market share as No.1 in Korea, Japan, Taiwan and so on based on database security.

WareValley has clients in the telecommunications, financial services, manufacturing and utilities sectors in South Korea, Japan, Taiwan and Malaysia include Samsung, Korea Telecom, Toyota, Sony, KDDI, NTT, Prudential, Chungwha Telecom, etc. WareValley has 250,000 users from 2,700 companies around the world.
