= LG Uplus =

South Korean cellular carrier

LG Uplus Corp.
- Current logo as of January 4, 2015
- Native name: Korean: LG유플러스
- Type: Public
- Traded as: KRX: 032640
- Industry: Telecommunications
- Predecessor: LG Telecom
- Founded: July 11, 1996; 30 years ago
- Headquarters: Yongsan-gu, Seoul, South Korea
- Area served: South Korea
- Key people: Hwang Hyeon Sik (CEO)
- Products: Mobile telephony; Wireless broadband services
- Revenue: KRW 13.42 trillion (2020)
- Operating income: KRW 886.2 billion (2020)
- Owner: LG Corporation (37%)
- Number of employees: 10,221 (as of June 2021)
- Divisions: Studio X+U
- Subsidiaries: AIN Teleservice; CS Leader
- Website: lguplus.com

LG Uplus Corp. (Korean: LG유플러스; stylized as LG U^{+}, KRX: 032640) is a South Korean mobile network operator owned by LG Corporation. It was formerly known as LG Telecom, but changed to its current name on July 1, 2010. LG Uplus is the second-largest wireless carrier in South Korea, with 18.411 million subscribers as of Q4 2023.

The carrier adopted its current name after the July 2010 merger with another two LG telecommunication subsidiaries, Dacom and Powercom. LG U^{+} offers a variety of mobile services. GeForce Now distributes by U^{+} 5G in South Korea, and MusicON was discontinued music service for Feature Phones. Kakaonavi recently partnered with LG U+.

== History ==
After a decision of the state-owned Korea Telecom to sell its cellular business to private investors in 1994, the South Korean government opened the telecommunications sector up to competition. Korea Telecom would later relaunch its cellular business with KT Freetel in 1996. LG entered the wireless communications market in 1996 by acquiring a CDMA license in June and founded a new carrier named LG Telecom, which built a nationwide digital cellular network. In October 1997, PCS cellular service was launched.

In March 1998, in an effort to make itself stand out from the bigger, more established players in the market, LG Telecom launched the world's first commercial cdmaOne data service using PCS technology.

To better position itself to compete in the bundled services market, LG Telecom acquired LG Dacom, a fixed-line communications networks and Internet-related service provider and LG Powercom, one of Korea's largest ISPs. On July 1, 2010, LG Telecom switched to its current name, "LG U^{+}."

In 2022, the company achieved an annual operating profit of 1 trillion won for the first time, but in 2023, due to an increase in capital expenditure (CAPEX) reached 998 billion won ($751.8 million), a decrease of 7.7% from 2022. Meanwhile, revenue rose 3.4% to 14.37 trillion won and service revenue excluding handset sales rose to 11.64 trillion won (up 2% from 2022). The total number of wireless subscribers or mobile network operator (MNO) and mobile virtual network operator (MVNO) subscribers was about 25.1 million (up 26.1%), and the number of 5G subscribers reached 7.04 million (up 16.2%), exceeding half of the total number of LG Uplus subscribers.

== Services ==
=== Wireless ===
As of 2012 LG Uplus customers can receive the services on any of radio frequency band assigned, one or more of radio interfaces.

Radio frequency range	Frequency band	Frequency width (MHz)	Generation	Radio Interface	License	Notes
850 MHz Uplink: 839–849 Downlink: 884–894	5	2x10	3.9G/4G	LTE/LTE-A		
2100 MHz Uplink: 1920–1940 Downlink: 2110–2130	1	2x20	3.9G/4G	LTE/LTE-A	auction 44.55billion won	
2600 MHz Uplink: 2520–2540 Downlink: 2640–2660	7	2x20	3.9G/4G	LTE/LTE-A	auction 479 billion won	
3500 MHz 3400–3500	n78	100	5G	NR		

Source: Slowtime

In July 2006, the South Korean government canceled LG Telecom's license for 2.1 GHz W-CDMA bandwidth after the company opted not to develop the technology. LG Telecom will instead continue investing and upgrading in its CDMA2000 EV-DO Rev. A network.

In July 2011, LG U+ launched its LTE network, nationwide coverage is expected to be complete by March 2012.

On July 17, 2013, LG Uplus launched LTE-A service with the introduction of the Galaxy S4 LTE-A, the world's first "100% LTE" smartphone that can utilize data, voice and text with LTE and not fall back to CDMA. Starting from 2014 LG Uplus plans to release only "100% LTE" phones.

=== Landline ===
In 2010 LG Telecom acquired Dacom Corp., a network services firm that operated Hanaro Telecom's fixed line networks. The new affiliate helped LG enter the landline communications market.

=== Broadband ===
Launched in September 2005, U+Home is an optic LAN service that provides fast speeds of up to 100 Mbit/s.

=== IPTV ===
U+TV was launched in December 2007, providing various two-way services, terrestrial and HD broadcasting.

=== Business-to-business sales ===
After merging LG DACOM in 2010, It was succeeded to LG Uplus one of the largest B2B service area. It is account for about 20% of gross sales by the role of cash-cow. It has not only traditional cable industry, also non-traditional one like electronic payment and so on.

=== U+ Mobile TV ===
LG Uplus' 'U+ Mobile TV' has been broadcasting 10 channels of CJ ENM's affiliates in real time. However, the two companies failed to narrow the gap over the fee for using the U+ mobile TV service. After all, on June 11, 2021, CJ ENM's affiliated channels stopped transmission on U+ Mobile TV.

In October 2022, LG Uplus launched the Studio X+U division as the original content provider for U+ Mobile TV.

==== Dramas ====
Source: Studio X+U

- Sometimes - For Sale, Because We Just Broke Up (썸타임즈 - 헤어져서 팝니다; 2023)
- High Cookie (하이쿠키; 2023)
- Night Has Come (밤이 되었습니다; 2023)
- Branding in Seongsu (브랜딩 인 성수동; 2024)
- Tarot (타로: 일곱 장의 이야기; 2024)
- No Way Out: The Roulette (노 웨이 아웃 : 더 룰렛; 2024)
- Fragile (프래자일; 2024)
- Friendly Rivalry (선의의 경쟁; 2025)
- Twelve (트웰브; 2025)
- Hunter with a Scalpel (메스를 든 사냥꾼; 2025)
- Love in Sync (공감세포; 2026)

== DDoS attacks ==
In January and February 2023, LG U+ was hit by a series of DDoS attacks that interrupted data services and resulted in personal information leakage. On February 16, 2023, LG U+ CEO Hwang Hyeon-sik apologized for the company's insufficient cybersecurity infrastructure and stated that their cybersecurity spending would increase by 100 billion won ($77.9 million) per year.

== See also ==
- LG Electronics
- SK Telecom
- Korea Communications Commission
- LG Hellovision
