= An Ye-seul =

South Korean singer (born 1995)

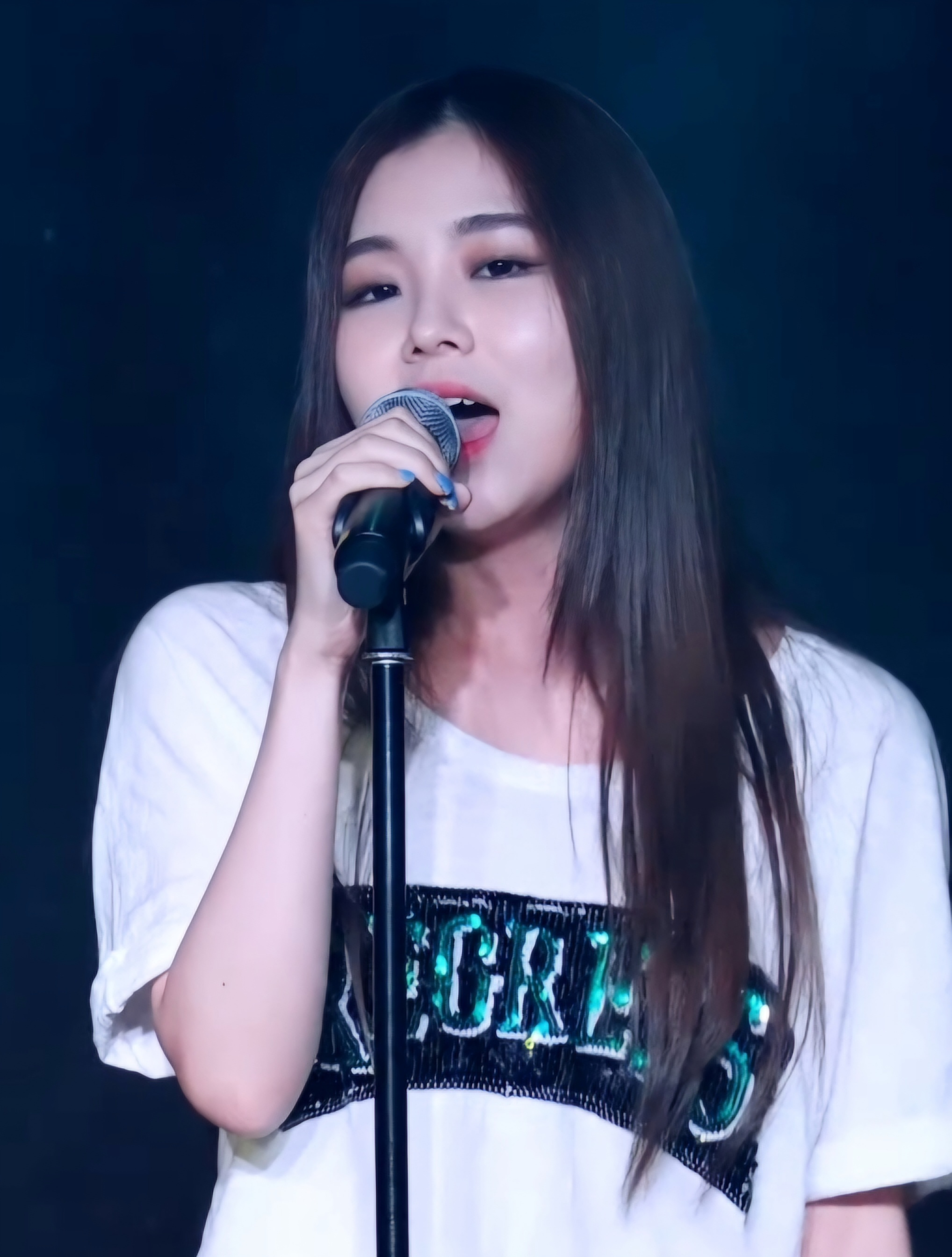

Background information
- Born: October 28, 1995 (age 30); Wonju, Gangwon Province, South Korea
- Genres: K-pop; R&B
- Occupation: Singer
- Years active: 2012–present

Korean name
- Hangul: 안예슬
- RR: An Yeseul
- MR: An Yesŭl

An Ye-seul (Korean: 안예슬; born October 28, 1995) is a South Korean singer. She is known as one of the Top 9 of Mnet's Superstar K4.

== Career ==
In 2012, An participated in Superstar K4. She eventually made it to the top 9.

In 2016, she participated in the show Produce 101, a reality girl group survival show on Mnet. It is a large-scale project in which the public "produces" a unit girl group by choosing members from a pool of 101 trainees from 46 entertainment companies as well as the group's concept, debut song, and group name.

== Discography ==
=== Single ===
Title	Year	Peak chart positions		Sales	Album
Title	Year	KOR Gaon	US World	Sales	Album
"The Unwritten Legend"	2012	—	—		Superstar K4 Top 12 - Part.1
"Sk8er Boi"	2012	—	—		Superstar K4 Top 12 - Part.2
"Love Leaves"	2013	78	—	24,354+	Two Weeks OST Part.2
"Walk"	2014	—	—		Real One
"Unable"	2015	—	—		Non-album single
"Ily"	2015	—	—		Non-album single
"To Memory" (Repeat featuring An Ye-seul)	2015	—	—		Non-album single
"Between Calmness and Passion" (with Son Joon-hyuk)	2015	—	—		Non-album single
"—" denotes releases that did not chart or were not released in that region. "*" indicates that the Gaon Chart was revamped at this time and digital sales were deflated.

== Filmography ==
=== TV series ===
Date	Title	Role	Network
2012	Superstar K4	herself	Mnet
2016	Produce 101	herself	Mnet
