= Fragile (TV series) =

2024 South Korean television series

- Promotional poster
- Hangul: 프래자일
- RR: Peuraejail
- MR: P'ŭraejail
- Genre: Teen drama; Coming-of-age
- Written by: Park Joo-yi
- Directed by: Ahn Ji-hoon
- Starring: Kim So-hee; Kim Eo-jin; Gong Joo-han; Kwon Hee-song; Moon Ji-won; Jeong Yun-seo; Kim Ye-rim; Cha Ji-hyeok; Cha Se-jin; Chae Ha-jin
- Country of origin: South Korea
- Original language: Korean
- No. of episodes: 8

Production
- Running time: 23–30 minutes
- Production company: Studio X+U

Original release
- Network: U+ Mobile TV
- Release: September 9 – October 28, 2024

Fragile (Korean: 프래자일) is a 2024 South Korean teen drama television series written by Park Joo-yi, directed by Ahn Ji-hoon. It was released on U+ Mobile TV from September 9, to October 28, 2024, every Monday at 00:00 (KST). It is also available for streaming on Kocowa in selected regions.

== Synopsis ==
A realistic teen drama exploring the challenges of adolescence, including social taboos, personal mistakes, academic pressures, love, heartbreak, success, and failure.

== Cast and characters ==
- Kim So-hee as Park Ji-yoo

The protagonist of wild rumors filled with choices, mistakes, and misunderstandings.

- Kim Eo-jin as Noh Chan-sung

Ji-yoo's boyfriend and a free-spirited, busy high school boy.

- Gong Joo-han as Kang San

Chan-sung delicate bestfriend.

- Kwon Hee-song as Seo A-ra

The cold-looking but warm-hearted loyal transfer student.

- Moon Ji-won as Jeon Mi-na

A student who likes pretty things.

- Jeong Yun-seo as Yeo Eun-soo

The cute peer counselor.

- Kim Ye-rim as Kim Ye-ri

The self-proclaimed genius student who would be a corpse if not for her sharp wit.

- Cha Ji-hyeok as Yoon Soo-ho

A student who has a handsome appearance and a personality that lives up to his reputation.

- Cha Se-jin as Nam Do-ha

A student with a likable appearance and personality but is hard to read.

- Chae Ha-jin as Han Soo-jin

A popular girl but cold only to Ji-yoo.

== Production and release ==
On April 22, 2024, LG Uplus' production company Studio X+U announced that they began the production of Fragile which was written by Park Ji-yoo and directed by Ahn Ji-hoon. In addition, the series featured a large number of promising new actors to reflect the generation that pursues reality with a competition rate reached 2500:1 through actor casting auditions in order to provide a sense of realism. It was scheduled to be released on U+ Mobile TV in the second half of 2024.

On August 14, 2024, Studio X+U confirmed the premiere date of the series to be on September 9, 2024, and would be releasing one episode every Monday at 00:00 (KST). It is also available to stream on Kocowa.

== See also ==
Skam – Similar plot story
