= Love Love Love (Roy Kim album) =

- Digital cover artwork

Studio album by Roy Kim
- Released: June 25, 2013
- Recorded: 2013
- Genre: Acoustic; contemporary country; folk; pop
- Length: 29:50
- Language: Korean
- Label: CJ E&M Music
- Producer: Jung Ji-chan

Roy Kim chronology
Love Love Love (2013)	Home (2014)

Singles from Love Love Love
- 1. "Bom Bom Bom" Released: April 22, 2013; 2. "Love Love Love" Released: June 25, 2013

Love Love Love is the debut studio album by South Korean singer-songwriter Roy Kim, released and distributed on June 25, 2013, through CJ E&M Music. The album features nine tracks in total, and spawned two hit singles: the million-selling hit "Bom Bom Bom" and the lead single under the same title. Due to the album's success, Kim earned a Mnet Asian Music Award for Best New Male Artist, and a Golden Disk Award for New Rising Star Award in Disk Album. As of July 2016, Love Love Love has sold over 19,000 physical copies and 2.94 million individual track downloads in Kim's native country (see Roy Kim discography).

== Background ==
Shortly after winning Mnet's talent competition series Superstar K4, it was announced that Kim was preparing to release a mini album in spring 2013. However, those plans were scrapped in favor of releasing Kim's first single "Bom Bom Bom" followed by a full-length album. Upon the release of "Bom Bom Bom" in April 2013, he began recording the rest of the album. In June of that year, it was announced by CJ E&M Music that the artist was in the final stages of preparing for the album.

== Release and promotion ==
On June 18, 2013, a week before the release of Love Love Love, the album's track listing was revealed, along with a teaser image. In the days leading up to the release, several more teasers were released, including the making-of videos of the recording process and a music video teaser.

Following the release of the album, Kim appeared on Mnet's music television program M! Countdown (June 27, 2013), where he performed "Let Me Love You" and the album's title track. He continued to promote the album on various music shows through July of that year.

== Reception ==
The album's pre-release single "Bom Bom Bom" topped the Gaon Digital Chart for two consecutive weeks, and the now-defunct Billboard Korea K-Pop Hot 100 for three straight weeks, respectively. At the end of 2013, the song was ranked at number seven (2.9%) in the top ten of Gallup Korea's "Song of the Year", tied with Im Chang-jung's "A Guy like Me" and 4Minute's "What's Your Name?". According to the Gaon Music Chart, it was the fourth most successful single of 2013, selling over 1.5 million digital copies that year. (Note: These figures include downloads from "Bom Bom Bom" as the album's track.) The song also was at number seven on the 2013 year-end Billboard Korea K-Pop Hot 100.

Upon release, Love Love Love debuted at number three on the Gaon Weekly Album Chart, while its title track reached number two on the Gaon Digital Chart, and number four on the Billboard Korea K-Pop Hot 100. "Love Love Love" became the 104th most successful single of 2013, selling over 732,000 digital copies that year. As of July 2016, the album has sold about 19,900 copies in Kim's native country.

== Track listing ==
English titles are adapted from the iTunes Store, and credits from Naver Music.

All tracks are written by Kim Sang-woo, except where noted

No.	Title	Translated title	Length
1.	"Intro (My Forest)"		0:55
2.	"When You Are Down" (이 노랠 들어요; I Norael Deureoyo) (co-composed by Jung Ji-chan)	Listen to This Song	3:29
3.	"Bom Bom Bom" (봄봄봄) (co-composed by Bae Young-kyung)	Spring Spring Spring	3:28
4.	"Let Me Love You" (그대를 사랑한단 말; Geudaereul Saranghandan Mal) (co-composed by Jung Ji-chan)	Words That Say I Love You	4:13
5.	"Love Love Love"		3:36
6.	"Grandfather's Camera" (할아버지와 카메라; Harabeojiwa Camera) (co-written and co-composed by Jung Ji-chan)	Grandpa and a Camera	3:46
7.	"Don't Know How" (도통 모르겠네; Dotong Moreugenne)	Really Don't Know	3:40
8.	"Follow Me" (나만 따라와; Naman Ttarawa)	Just Follow Me	2:59
9.	"12 O'Clock"		3:44
Total length:			29:50

Additional notes:

- "Intro (My Forest)" was recorded at Roy Forest built by Kim's fans to celebrate his album release. The forest is located near Guryong Station in Gaepo-dong, Gangnam-gu, Seoul.

== Credits and personnel ==
Credits are adapted from the album's liner notes.

Locations

- Recorded at Roy Forest (track 1)
- Recorded at CJes studio (track 2)
- Recorded at T Studio (track 3)
- Recorded at Booming Studio (track 3)
- Recorded at Seoul Studio (tracks 4–9)
- Recorded at ShinShack Studio, Nashville, TN (drum, percussion, and cello)
- Recorded at Little Big Sound, Nashville, TN (drum, percussion, and cello)
- Mixed at Musicabal (tracks 1, 3–6, 9)
- Mixed at CJes Studio (tracks 2, 7–8)
- Mastered at Metropolis Mastering, London

Personnel

- Sang-woo Kim – vocals (all tracks), composer (all tracks), arranger (track 1), acoustic guitar (track 1), lyrics (tracks 2–9), backing vocals (track 7)
- Ji-chan Jung – recording (track 1), composer (track 2), arranger (tracks 2–9), acoustic guitar (tracks 2–9), electric guitar (tracks 2, 5), keyboard (tracks 2–5), percussion (tracks 3, 6), lyrics (tracks 4, 6), ukulele (track 6), bass (track 6), rhodes (tracks 6, 9), music producer
- Young-kyung Bae – composer (track 3)
- Hyun-jung Go – mixing (tracks 1, 3–6, 9)
- Dan Needham – drum (tracks 2, 4–5), percussion (track 2, 4–5)
- Hoon Choi – bass (tracks 2, 4–5, 7–8)
- Hyun-seok Kim – keyboard (tracks 2, 4–5, 7–8), piano (track 7), arranger (track 8), music co-producer
- Jung-hwan Kim – banjo (tracks 2, 5), acoustic guitar (track 5)
- Tae-woo Kang – backing vocals (tracks 2, 4–5, 8)
- Hyung Choi – mixing (tracks 2, 7–8)
- Hyun-woo Eom – recording (tracks 2, 4–9)
- Hyun-in Jung – recording (tracks 2, 4–9)
- Seong-yoon Kim – arranger (track 3)
- Seok-chul Shin – drum (tracks 3, 7–8)
- Seong-shik Jeon – contrabass (track 3)
- Jun-ho Hong – electric guitar (tracks 3–4, 7)
- Ah-ra Cho – violin (track 3)
- Yang-soo Noh – recording (track 3)
- Pyung-wook Lee – recording (track 3)
- John Gatchings – cello (tracks 6, 9)
- Ken Lewis – percussion (track 6)
- CJ E&M – executive producer
- Ja-hoon Gu – mixing assistant engineer
- Mi-young Gu – mixing assistant engineer
- Kyung-joon Lee – mixing assistant engineer
- Bobby Shin – recording of drum, percussion, and cello, Nashville production
- David Donghwa Han – assistant engineer, production assistant
- Stuart Hawkes – mastering

== Charts and sales ==
=== Weekly charts ===
Chart (2013–present)	Peak position
South Korean Albums (Gaon)	3

=== Monthly charts ===
Chart (2013–present)	Peak position
South Korean Albums (Gaon)	12

=== Year-end charts ===
Chart (2013)	Position
South Korean Albums (Gaon)	81

Chart (2014)	Position
South Korean Albums (Gaon)	391

=== Sales ===
Country	Sales
South Korea (Gaon)	19,900

== Awards and nominations ==
=== Annual music awards ===
Year	Award	Category	Recipient	Result
2013	7th Mnet 20's Choice	20's Booming Star – Male	Roy Kim	Won
2013	15th Mnet Asian Music Awards	Best New Male Artist	Roy Kim	Won
2014	28th Golden Disk Awards	New Rising Star Award in Disk Album	Roy Kim	Won
2014	28th Golden Disk Awards	Popularity Award in Digital Music	Roy Kim	Won

=== Music program awards ===
Song	Program	Date
"Bom Bom Bom"	Show! Music Core (MBC)	May 11, 2013
"Love Love Love"	Show! Music Core (MBC)	July 6, 2013

== Covers and usage in media ==
- In August 2013, singer Parc Jae-jung covered "Love Love Love" on Superstar K5, which he was later crowned the winner.
- In August 2014, "Love Love Love" was featured in a commercial for the mobile music application, KakaoMusic.
- On November 12, 2014, Thai singer Natthew released a remake of "Don't Know How", which was Kim's first song ever to be covered.
- On March 2, 2016, singer-songwriter Bily Acoustie covered "Bom Bom Bom" through his live performance on MBC's radio show Park Jung-ah's Moonlight Paradise.
- In April 2016, "Bom Bom Bom" was featured on advertisements for KT Corporation's "Y24 Mobile Plan".
- On April 12, 2016, boy band KNK covered "Bom Bom Bom" through their live performance on SBS MTV's music television program The Show.

== Release history ==
Region	Date	Format	Edition	Label	Ref.
South Korea	June 25, 2013	CD; digital download		CJ E&M Music	
Worldwide	June 25, 2013	Digital download		CJ E&M Music	
Taiwan	June 26, 2013	CD		CJ E&M Music	
Taiwan	August 9, 2013	CD+DVD	Limited	CJ E&M Music; Warner Music Group	
Hong Kong	August 9, 2013	CD+DVD		CJ E&M Music; Warner Music Group	
Singapore	August 9, 2013	CD+DVD		CJ E&M Music; Warner Music Group	
Malaysia	August 23, 2013	CD+DVD		CJ E&M Music; Warner Music Group	

== See also ==
- List of Korea K-Pop Hot 100 number-one singles
- List of number-one hits of 2013 (South Korea)
