= The Great Dipper (album) =

Studio album by Roy Kim
- Released: December 4, 2015
- Recorded: 2015
- Genre: Ballad
- Length: 32:51
- Language: Korean; English
- Label: MMO Entertainment; CJ E&M Music
- Producer: Kim Jung-hoon (exec.); Ahn Seok-jun (exec.); Jung Ji-chan

Roy Kim chronology
Home (2014)	The Great Dipper (2015)

Singles from The Great Dipper
- 1. "The Great Dipper" Released: December 4, 2015

The Great Dipper (Korean: 북두칠성; RR: Bukduchilseong) is the third Korean studio album by South Korean singer-songwriter Roy Kim. It was released on December 4, 2015, by MMO Entertainment, and distributed through CJ E&M Music. The album features nine tracks in total, including the eponymous lead single which was the first ballad title track of Kim's career. As of July 2016, The Great Dipper has sold over 7,000 physical copies and 460,000 individual track downloads in Kim's native country (see Roy Kim discography).

== Background ==
In August 2015, during a backstage interview with Billboard K-Town at KCON 2015, Kim previewed his upcoming album: "The third album, I'm working on it. I don't know when it'll come out, but I think it'll be more deep. I don't think people will like it." He added by saying, "It's going to be way more deep. In terms of the topics, and the songwriting, it's going to be very minimal in the way of arranging the music. That could change, it's all a secret, but now I've told you everything."

Two months later, it was announced that Kim had renewed his contract with CJ E&M Music. On November 13, when Kim was filming his new music video, an official from CJ E&M Music stated that the artist was preparing for his comeback while aiming for early December. The comeback date was later confirmed as December 4, according to a teaser image uploaded onto Kim's official SNS accounts. The artist announced, on November 20, that his forthcoming album and its lead single would be entitled The Great Dipper.

Kim expressed his special attachment to stars, which also serve as the album's main theme. On December 1, Kim hosted a show called RoyStar FM on Melon Radio, stating, "Even on ordinary days, I'd written a lot of songs about stars because I thought we resembled them." Kim also said that his new album would be definitely different from his previous studio album since the album has more piano melodies than it has guitar tunes.

== Release and reception ==
On November 18, 2015, a teaser image for the album was revealed, along with a confirmed release date (December 4). The album's artwork also was uploaded through Kim's official SNS channels on November 25. Two days later, a handwritten image of the album's track listing was posted onto Kim's Instagram account. On December 2, a 20-second music video teaser for the title track "The Great Dipper" was released via YouTube.

The album was released digitally at 12:00 am KST on December 4, alongside the music video for its eponymous lead track (directed by music video director Kwon Soon-wook). (Note: Kwon has also been known as the second eldest brother of singer-songwriter and actress BoA.) Upon release, The Great Dipper reached number eight on the Gaon Weekly Album Chart. As of July 2016, the album has sold about 7,200 copies in Kim's native country.

On December 16, Kim released music videos for some of the album's other tracks ("Stay" and "I Want to Love You") onto YouTube, as special gifts for his fans. (Note: According to the album's liner notes, both music videos were directed by music video director Song Won-young. Song had also directed the music videos ("Home" and "When Autumn Comes") for Kim's previous studio album, Home (2014).)

== Singles ==
=== "The Great Dipper" ===
"The Great Dipper", the album's lead single, is the first ballad title track that Kim has released, while all of his other songs have been acoustic folk songs. Inspired from the Big Dipper, consisting of the seven bright stars which have traditionally guided navigators, the song serenely expresses the emotions of love, separation, and longing experienced by ordinary people. According to the artist's label, the title track also portrays the loneliness and sadness that Kim feels in his daily life. The song is about a man who promises to shine upon the woman he loves no matter where she is, like the Big Dipper.

About writing the song, Kim commented, "At that time, I didn't sleep well studying for my final exams at university. When I stepped outside to watch the sky, I could see the Big Dipper. I began writing the song after being impressed by the fact that we get to see the asterism wherever on Earth stars are visible. (However,) it was actually the Orion's Belt rather than the Big Dipper." He added that "Not only exactly for romance or love, I hope the song becomes a direction for those who are pinched with cold, worried, or disoriented."

"The Great Dipper" peaked at number 30 on the Gaon Digital Chart, having sold nearly 308,000 digital copies domestically as of the first half of 2016.

== Promotion ==
On December 3, 2015, a day prior to the album's release, Kim held a comeback showcase at Understage, Yongsan-gu in Seoul. During the showcase, he premiered "The Great Dipper", "I Want to Love You", and "Stay". He also said that "I think this album peeled off my pretence. It talks about my candid stories that I'd concealed, and reflects the trace of thinking about which direction I should go." The showcase aired through mobile live streaming on Naver's "V" phone application.

The artist began promoting his comeback album on various music programs, starting on KBS's Music Bank (December 4). He promoted the lead single on Music Bank, Show! Music Core (MBC), Inkigayo (SBS), The Show (SBS M), Show Champion (MBC M), and M Countdown (Mnet). On You Hee-yeol's Sketchbook (KBS), Kim performed the title track and "I Want to Love You".

On November 23, it was announced that Kim would hold his year-end concert which shares the same name as the album's title. For three days from December 18 to 20, the artist performed at Yonsei University's Baekyang Hall in Seoul, to promote the album.

== Track listing ==
English titles are adapted from the iTunes Store, and credits from Naver Music.

All tracks are written by Kim Sang-woo.

No.	Title	Translated title	Length
1.	"The Wave" (파도; Pado)		3:50
2.	"The Great Dipper" (북두칠성; Bukduchilseong)		3:48
3.	"Gone with the Wind" (바람에 날려본다; Barame nallyeobonda)	Letting It Blow in the Wind	4:00
4.	"Stay" (떠나지 마라; Tteonaji mara)	Don't Leave	3:46
5.	"I Want to Love You" (나도 사랑하고 싶다; Nado saranghago sipda)	I Want to Fall in Love, Too	3:01
6.	"Remember Me"		3:22
7.	"Tear Drops" (눈물 한 방울; Nunmul han bangul)	A Drop of Tears	3:22
8.	"What's Left Behind" (남기고 떠나죠; Namgigo tteonajo)	Leaving It Behind	4:15
9.	"The Lullaby"		3:27
Total length:			32:51

Additional notes:

- The title of track 2 refers to the "Big Dipper", the seven brightest stars of the constellation Ursa Major.
- "Remember Me" was originally intended for the soundtrack of the 2015 television series The Producers.
- "The Lullaby" is the only song from the album that was entirely written in English.

== Credits and personnel ==
Credits are adapted from the album's liner notes.

Locations

- Recorded at Brownstone Studio, Nashville, TN (drum and bass guitar)
- Recorded at Jane's Place Studio, Nashville, TN (percussion)
- Recorded at The Village Studios, LA (string)
- Recorded at ShinShack Studio, Nashville, TN (drum, bass, percussion, and orchestra)
- Recorded at Booming Sound (all vocals and Roy Kim's acoustic guitar)
- Recorded at Live Studio (all vocals and Roy Kim's acoustic guitar)
- Mixed at Musicabal (all tracks)
- Mastered at Metropolis Mastering, London

Personnel

- Sang-woo Kim – vocals (all tracks), lyrics (all tracks), composer (all tracks), backing vocals (track 1), acoustic guitar (tracks 3, 6, 8–9), album artist (credited as Roy Kim)
- Ji-chan Jung – arranger (all tracks), acoustic guitar (tracks 1, 4–5, 7), keyboard (tracks 1–5, 8), bass (tracks 1, 4), piano (tracks 2–5, 7–8), arranging of additional orchestra (track 2), rhodes (track 6), music producer
- Eric Darken – percussion (tracks 1, 4–5)
- Nashville Recording Orchestra – string (tracks 1, 3–4, 7–8), brass (tracks 1, 3, 7–8)
- David Davidson – arranging of orchestra (tracks 1, 4, 7–8)
- Cody McVey – arranging of orchestra (tracks 1, 4, 7–8)
- In-young Bak – arranging and conducting of string (tracks 2, 4)
- LA String Ensemble – performing of string (tracks 2, 4)
- Dan Needham – drum (tracks 3, 8)
- Craig Nelson – bass (tracks 3, 8)
- Jun-ho Hong – electric guitar (tracks 4–5)
- Tim Starnes – recording of string
- Jeff Gartenbaum – recording assistant
- William Centenaro – recording assistant
- Baeho "Bobby" Shin – recording of drum, bass guitar, percussion, bass, and orchestra
- Ben Smith – recording assistant
- Pyung-wook Lee – recording of all vocals and Roy Kim's acoustic guitar
- Si-hwa Nam – recording of all vocals and Roy Kim's acoustic guitar
- Hyun-jung Go – mixing (all tracks)
- Stuart Hawkes – mastering
- Jung-hoon Kim – executive producer (MMO Entertainment)
- Seok-jun Ahn – executive producer (CJ E&M)

== Charts and sales ==
=== Weekly charts ===
Chart (2015–present)	Peak position
South Korean Albums (Gaon)	8

=== Monthly charts ===
Chart (2015–present)	Peak position
South Korean Albums (Gaon)	21

=== Year-end charts ===
Chart (2015)	Position
South Korean Albums (Gaon)	162

=== Sales ===
Country	Sales
South Korea (Gaon)	7,200

== Release history ==
Region	Date	Format	Edition	Label	Ref.
South Korea	December 4, 2015	CD; digital download		MMO Entertainment; CJ E&M Music	
Worldwide	December 4, 2015	Digital download		MMO Entertainment; CJ E&M Music	
Taiwan	December 4, 2015	CD			
Taiwan	December 25, 2015	CD+DVD	Limited	Warner Music Group	
