= KT Shooting Team =

KT Shooting Team emblem

KT Shooting Team, also known as the National Shooting Team of South Korea, is a professional shooting team sponsored by KT Corporation that has formerly represented South Korea in international shooting competitions. Established in 1985, it comprises 11 shooters, all of whom serve on the National Team. The team has numerous achievement, including one gold medal in both the 1992 and 2008 Summer Olympics.

== Medals ==
- 2008 Beijing Olympics: 1 Gold Medal, 1 Silver Medal
- 2006 World Shooting Championship: 1 Silver Medal
- 2006 Doha Asian Games: 1 Gold Medal, 4 Silver Medals, 2 Bronze Medals
- 2006 Guangzhou World Cup: 2 Gold Medals
- 2004 Athens Olympics: 1 Silver Medal
- 2003 SSF Changwon World Cup: 2 Gold Medals
- 2002 Busan Asian Games: 1 Gold Medal, 5 Silver Medals, 3 Bronze Medals
- 2002 World Shooting Championship: 2 Gold Medals, 1 Silver Medal, 1 Bronze Medal
- 1998 World Shooting Championship: 2 Gold Medals
- 1994 Hiroshima Asian Games: 2 Gold Medals
- 1992 Barcelona Olympics: 1 Gold Medal
- 1990 Beijing Asian Games: 1 Silver Medal, 1 Bronze Medal

== Players ==
- Jin Jong-oh

== See also ==
- Shooting at the Summer Olympics
- International Shooting Sport Federation
