= DickPunks =

Rock band based in South Korea

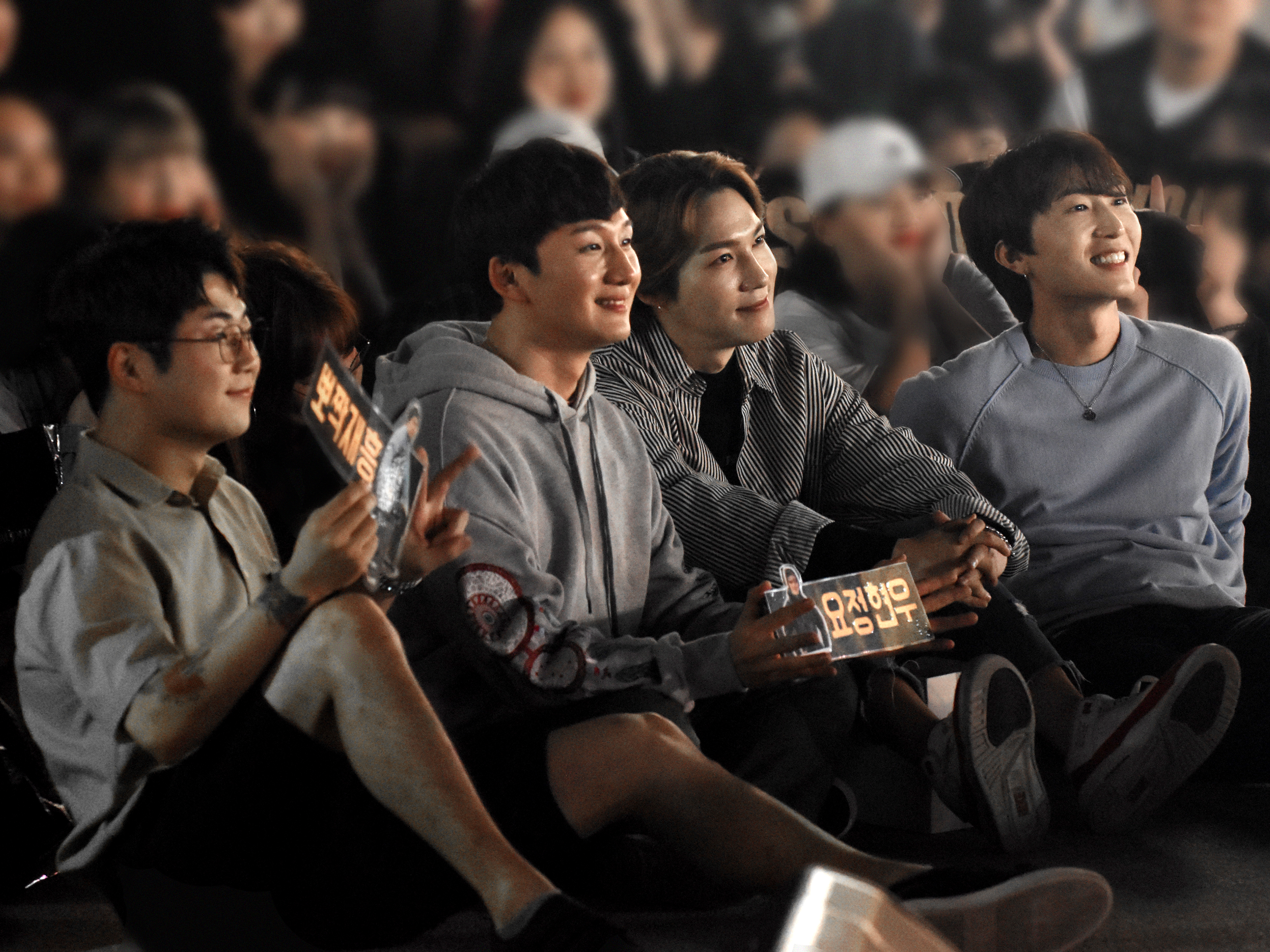
- DickPunks busking in Hongdae, September 19, 2019

Background information
- Also known as: DPNS
- Origin: Seoul, South Korea
- Genres: Pop rock, alternative rock
- Years active: 2006–present
- Labels: TNC Company Sony Music Entertainment
- Members: Taehyun; Hyunwoo; Jaeheung; Garam
- Website: tnc-company.co.kr

DickPunks (Korean: 딕펑스), also known as DPNS, is a rock band based in South Korea, consisting of four members. The band was formed in November 2006, without a guitarist because the keyboard player, Hyunwoo, wanted the band to be considered a piano-driven ensemble. Hyunwoo formed the band by recruiting his friends as members. The band has maintained the original line-up since its creation and is currently managed by the TNC Company.

Though DickPunks was one of many bands in Hongdae, they were popular amongst their critics and often nicknamed "Hongdae Idol", despite not being such literally. Wanting to expand their fan base, DickPunks decided to participate in Superstar K4. They finished the competition in second place in November 2012.

All of the band's members are credited with composing and producing their music. In addition to their live performances, they also perform a separate choreographed act entitled the DICKPUNKSHOW.

== Members ==
- Kim Tae-hyun (김태현) – Vocals
- Kim Hyun-woo (김현우) – Keyboard
- Kim Jae-heung (김재흥) – Bass
- Park Ga-ram (박가람) – Drums

== Discography ==
=== Studio albums ===
Title	Album details	Peak chart positions	Sales
Title	Album details	KOR	Sales
1st Album	Released: 29 September 2011; Formats: digital download; Track listing: 1. Rock To Me; 2. Good! Great! (좋다! 좋아!); 3. Unrequited Love (짝사랑); 4. My Precious; 5. Butterfly (나비); 6. Romance in the Alps (알프스 산맥의 로망); 7. Kyang (걍); 8. Wonderland Basket (원더랜드 바스켓); 9. Such A Beautiful Bad Girl; 10. Cheerleader (치어걸); 11. Aspirin (아스피린); 12. End…And	—N/a	

=== Extended plays ===
Title	Album details	Peak chart positions	Sales
Title	Album details	KOR	Sales
1st EP	Released: 1 February 2010; Formats: digital download; Track listing: 1. Good! Great! (좋다! 좋아!); 2. Cheerleader (치어걸); 3. Butterfly (나비); 4. Romance in the Alps (알프스 산맥의 로망); 5. Wonderland Basket (원더랜드 바스켓); 6. Aspirin (아스피린)	—N/a	
Viva Primavera	Released: 25 April 2013; Label: TNC Company, Sony Music Entertainment; Formats: CD, digital download; Track listing: 1. Star (별); 2. Viva Youth (Viva청춘); 3. New Yorker; 4. Astigmatism (난시); 5. Answer Me; 6. Go to the Pharmacy (약국에가면)	4	KOR: 8,259+
Hello Goodbye	Released: 27 November 2013; Label: TNC Company, Sony Music Entertainment; Formats: CD, digital download; Track listing: 1. Intro; 2. Hello Girlfriend (안녕 여자친구); 3. 1 그 일); 4. Fading (바래져); 5. Spoiled (철부지); 6. Grey: Shorry (회색: 쇼리)	8	KOR: 5,406+
29,	Released: 18 December 2015; Label: TNC Company, Sony Music Entertainment; Formats: CD, digital download; Track listing: 1. I Don't Miss You Now (지금을 잃고 싶지 않아); 2. Show Me (니가 보여); 3. What; 4. You Wouldn't Listen (들리지 않겠죠); 5. Adult (어른); 6. To You	13	KOR: 1,867+

=== Singles ===
Title	Year	Peak chart positions	Album
Title	Year	KOR	Album
"Viva Youth" (Viva청춘)	2013	23	Viva Primavera
"Sunglass" (썬글라스)	2013	30	Non-album single
"Hello Girlfriend" (안녕 여자친구)	2013	31	Hello Goodbye
"Let's Play In The Han River" (한강에서 놀아요)	2015	—	Non-album single
"We Young" (요즘젊은것들) feat. Microdot	2015	—	Non-album single
"Show Me" (니가 보여)	2015	—	29,
"Bicycle Man"	2019	—	Bicycle Man

|"—" denotes releases that did not chart. |

=== Collaborations ===
Year	Title	Artist(s)
2014	"Soul Mate" (소울메이트)	Dickpunks and Jiyoon of 4Minute

=== Soundtrack appearances ===
Year	Title	Drama	Member(s)
2013	"This Is The Person" (이 사람이다)	Two Weeks OST	All
2014	"Tears Fall" (눈물이 펑펑)	Angel Eyes OST	Taehyun
2015	"My Heart Is That Way" (내맘이 그래요)	Beloved Eun-dong OST	Taehyun
2016	"You Pour A Star" (별이 쏟아지는 너)	Cinderella with Four Knights OST	All

=== Compilations ===
Year	Title	Album
2012	"Woolung Island Twist" (울릉도 트위스트)	Superstar K4
2012	"Red Dragonfly"(고추잠자리)	Superstar K4
2012	"Walk With Me" (같이 걸을까)	Superstar K4
2012	"Muzik"	Superstar K4
2012	"After The Play" (연극이 끝난후)	Superstar K4
2012	"Don't Leave" (떠나지마)	Superstar K4
2012	"Playing Something Memorable" (노는게 남는거야)	Superstar K4
2012	"Butterfly" (나비)	Superstar K4
2012	"Sing a Song"	Superstar K4
2012	"Aspirin" (아스피린)	Superstar K4
2012	"Run! My Friend" (달리자 내 친구야)	Red Devils – We Are The Reds

== Awards ==
- 2012 – MNET "Superstar K Season 4" – 2nd place

== Live performances ==
- 2008 to Present – DickPunks solo concert (11th DICKPUNKSHOW in MAY 2013)
- 2007 to Present – Street performance over 1000 times
- 2012 – 2013 Pentaport Rock Festival
- 2011 – 2011 Green Plugged 2011
- 2012 – Superstar K4 Concert
- 2011 – 2013 Pusan Rock Festival
- 2013 – Green Plugged 2013
- 2010 – MUSICAL "Looking for the CheerGirl"
- 2013 – Son Yeon-Jae gala show

== Appearances and media ==
- 2012 – MNET "Superstar K" (season 4)
- 2013 – MNET "MUST"
- 2013 – MNET "MCOUNTDOWN"
