= List of mobile virtual network operators in South Korea =

This is a list of mobile virtual network operators (MVNOs) in South Korea, which lease wireless telephone and data spectrum from the major mobile network operators (MNOs) SK Telecom (SKT), KT Corporation, and LG U+, and resell it to customers.

== Active operators ==
Company	Host network(s)	Voice over LTE	WiFi Calling	eSIM	MVNO Type	Start date
KT Corporation	KT Corporation	Yes	Yes	Yes	PAYM/PAYG	1981
SK Telecom	SK Telecom	Yes	Yes	Yes	PAYM/PAYG	1984
LG UPlus	LG UPlus	Yes	Yes	Yes	PAYM/PAYG	1996
IDIS Powertel	KT Corporation	Yes	Yes	No	PAYM	1985
EyeVision Corp.	KT Corporation, SK Telecom, LG UPlus	Yes	Yes	Yes	PAYM/PAYG	1992
Sejong Telecom Inc.	KT Corporation, SK Telecom, LG UPlus	Yes	Yes	Yes	PAYM	1992
Harrie Inc.	LG UPlus, KDDI, China Mobile	Partial	Yes	Yes	PAYG	2016
Freetelecom	KT Corporation, SK Telecom, LG UPlus	Yes	Yes	Yes	PAYM/PAYG	2009
Tossmobile	KT Corporation, SK Telecom, LG UPlus	Yes	Yes	Yes	PAYM	2009
Chancemobile	LG UPlus	Yes	Yes	Yes	PAYM	2024
