= GiGA Island =

GiGA Island is a South Korean corporate social responsibility initiative which aims to improve the quality of life in remote areas such as islands and highlands by improving education, healthcare, and culture, through utilizing ICT (Information & Communications Technologies) solutions and high speed internet connections. GiGA Island was first launched by KT (Korea Telecom) in 2014, which now operates in five locations in South Korea. The first international Giga Island program was launched in Bangladesh on the Moheshkhali Island in 2017.
