= Mnet 20's Choice Awards =

South Korean pop culture awards

- Official logo of the 2013 edition
- Awarded for: Excellence in the music and entertainment industries
- Country: South Korea
- Presented by: CJ E&M (Mnet)
- First award: 2007
- Final award: 2013
- Website: http://20choice.interest.me/

Television/radio coverage
- Network: Mnet

The Mnet 20's Choice Awards was a major music awards show that was held annually in South Korea, organized by CJ E&M through its Mnet channel.

== 2013 ==
The 2013 20's Choice Awards were held on July 18, 2013, at the Korea International Exhibition Center (KINTEX) in Ilsan, Goyang, South Korea. The event was hosted by Shinhwa's Minwoo and Jun Jin and TV personality Kim Seul-gi. The theme was "Legend of 20's".

Here is the list of winners.

=== 20's Choice Awards ===
20's Movie Star – Male	20's Movie Star – Female
Ryu Seung-ryong (Miracle in Cell No. 7); Ha Jung-woo (The Berlin File); Kim Soo-hyun (Secretly, Greatly); Lee Byung-hun (Masquerade); Song Joong-ki (A Werewolf Boy)	Park Bo-young (A Werewolf Boy); Kim Min-hee (Very Ordinary Couple); Jun Ji-hyun (The Berlin File); Park Shin-hye (Miracle in Cell No. 7); Gong Hyo-jin (Boomerang Family)
20's Drama Star – Male	20's Drama Star – Female
Lee Jin-wook (Nine); Jo In-sung (That Winter, the Wind Blows); Lee Jong-suk (I Can Hear Your Voice, School 2013); Oh Ji-ho (Queen of the Office); Lee Seung-gi (Gu Family Book)	Bae Suzy (Gu Family Book); Kim Hye-soo (Queen of the Office); Song Hye-kyo (That Winter, the Wind Blows); Lee Bo-young (I Can Hear Your Voice, Seoyoung, My Daughter); Soo Ae (King of Ambition)
20's Style	20's Variety Star
CL ("The Baddest Female"); 4Minute ("What's Your Name?"); Beenzino ("Aqua Man"); Lee Hyori ("Bad Girls", "Miss Korea"); Kim Won-jung (2012 Herald Donga TV – Best Model)	Shin Dong-yup (SNL Korea); Tak Jae-hoon (Beatles Code); Lee Juck (Enemy of Broadcasting); Choi Jong-hoon (Blue Tower); Kim Jin-pyo (Top Gear Korea)
20's Booming Star – Male	20's Booming Star – Female
Roy Kim ("Spring Spring Spring"); Do Ji-han (Incarnation of Money, The Tower); Kim Woo-bin (School 2013, A Gentleman's Dignity); Yong Jun-hyung (Monstar); Super Junior-M Henry (Final Recipe, Trap)	Ha Yeon-soo (Monstar); Kim Seul-gi (SNL Korea, Flower Boys Next Door); Kim Ye-rim ("All Right"); Lee Yu-bi (Gu Family Book, The Innocent Man); Baek Jin-hee (Pots of Gold, Jeon Woo-chi)
20's Performance	20's Mwave Global Star
Shinee ("Dream Girl"); 4Minute ("What's Your Name?"); Sistar ("Give it to Me"); Shinhwa ("This Love"); Girls' Generation ("I Got a Boy")	Shinhwa; 2PM; Super Junior-M; Exo; Infinite
20's Hot Band	20's Hot Rapper
Daybreak ("Love Actually"); Romantic Punch ("Saturday Night Fever"); J Rabbit ("Nowadays, You Are"); Idiotape ("Even Floor"); Galaxy Express ("Always")	Verbal Jint ("If It Ain′t Love"); Geeks ("Wash Away"); Baechigi ("Shower of Tears"); Beenzino ("Aqua Man"); Double K ("Rewind")
20's Hot Cover Music	20's Online Music
Roy Kim & Jung Joon-young (Superstar K4) – "After Turning Into Dust"; Yoo Seung-woo (Superstar K4) – "My Son" (Kim Gun-mo); Yong Jun-hyung (Monstar OST) – "Past Days" (Ryu Jae-ha); Lee Ye-joon (The Voice of Korea 2 – "For You, For You" (Lee Seung-hwan); Daybreak (Band Generation) – "Sad Mannequin" (Hyun Jin-young)	Sistar ("Give it to Me"); Lee Hyori ("Bad Girls"); 4Minute ("What's Your Name?"); Cho Yong-pil ("Hello"); Girls' Generation ("I Got a Boy")
20's Voice
Shinhwa ("This Love"); Cho Yong-pil ("Bounce", "Hello"); Psy ("Gentleman"); Lee Hyori ("Bad Girls", "Miss Korea"); Sistar ("Give it to Me")

=== Special awards ===
Award	Winner
20's Record	Cho Yong-pil
20's Black Yak Marmot Blue Carpet Popularity Award	Lee Hyori
Best Global Touring Artist	Infinite
Icon of 20's	Lee Hyori

== 2012 ==
The theme of the 2012 show was "Do [Don'ts] Super 20's" and the nominations were announced on June 7, with the ceremony taking place on June 28. The winners are listed as follows:

- 20's Drama Actor: Kim Soo-hyun
- 20's Drama Actress: Han Ji-min
- 20's Movie Actor: Lee Je-hoon
- 20's Movie Actress: Suzy
- 20's Online Music: Busker Busker
- 20's Trendy Music: Girls' Generation-TTS
- 20's Band Music: The Koxx
- 20's Performance: Trouble Maker (Hyuna & Hyunseung)
- 20's Sexiest Performance: Sistar
- 20's Style: Jang Yoon-ju
- 20's Click: Fashion King
- 20's Do Don'ts: Park Jin-young
- 20's Social Artist: Lee Hyori
- 20's Gag Character: Raitto
- 20's Upcoming 20's: Yeo Jin-goo
- 20's Booming Star: Jo Jung-suk
- 20's Sports Star: Koo Ja-cheol
- 20's Global Star: Super Junior
- 20's Blue Carpet Star: Kim Soo-hyun
- 20's Variety Star: Han Hye-jin

== 2011 ==
The ceremony took place on July 7 at the River Park outdoor swimming pool at Seoul-Walkerhill Hotel with actor Song Joong-ki and singer Bae Suzy of miss A as MCs.

- Hot Drama Actor: Cha Seung-won
- Hot Drama Actress: Gong Hyo-jin
- Hot Style Icon: Gong Hyo-jin
- Hot Korean Wave Star: Kara
- Hot Blue Carpet Star: f(x)
- Hot New Star: Suzy
- Hot Performance Star: Beast
- Hot Funniest Guys: BalleriNO
- Hot Body Female: Lee Ha-nui
- Hot Body Male: Cha Seung-won
- Hot 20's Voice: Yoo Ah-in
- Hot Campus Girl: Goo Hara
- Hot Trend Musician: f(x)
- Hot Online Song: "Black & White" (G.NA)
- Pocari Sweat Hot Balance Star: 2AM
- Hot Trendy Guy: Kim Min-jun
- Hot Mentor: Lee Seung-chul
- Hot Variety Star: Yoo Se-yoon
- Hot Movie Star: Kang So-ra
- Hot Sports Star: Son Yeon-jae
- Hot CF Star: IU

== 2010 ==
20's Most Influential Stars:

- 2PM
- 4Minute
- T-ara
- 2AM
- Lee Soo-geun
- Ki Sung-Yueng
- Kim Tae-won
- Supreme Team
- Park Myung-soo
- Bang Si-hyuk
- Kim Hyun-joong
- Tiger JK and Yoon Mi-rae
- Kim Kap-soo
- UV
- Shin Se-kyung
- Chun Jung-myung
- Lee Jung-jae
- Seo In-young
- Jo Kwon
- Ahn Cheol-soo

Smoothie King Cool Star Award: Beast

Favorite Style Girl Group for Dance, Style, and Body: 4Minute

Daum's Search Hot Star Award: 2PM

== 2009 ==
- Hot Drama Star, Male: Lee Seung-gi (Brilliant Legacy)
- Hot Drama Star, Female: Han Hyo-joo (Brilliant Legacy)
- Hot Movie Star, Male: Ha Jung-woo (Take Off)
- Hot Movie Star, Female: Ha Ji-won (Haeundae)
- Hot CF Star: 2NE1 & Big Bang – "Lollipop"
- Hot New Star: 2NE1
- Hot Variety Star: Gil
- Hot Character: Teacher Kang
- Hot Multitainer: Lee Hyori
- Hot Sport Star: Yuna Kim
- Hot Body: Lee Hyori
- Hot Style Icon: Lee Hyori
- Hot Fashionista: Shin Min-a
- Hot Online Song: "Fire" by 2NE1
- Hot Performance Star: 2PM
- Hot Boom Up Song: "Neverending Story" by Yoon Sang-hyun
- Hot Couple: Kim Yong-jun and Hwang Jung-eum
- Hot Mr. Beauty: Nichkhun
- Hot Summer Heat Popularity Award: 2PM

== 2008 ==
- Hot Younger Male: Yoo Seung-ho
- Hot Movie Star, Female: Kim Min-hee
- Hot Movie Star, Male: Jang Keun-suk
- Hot Drama Star, Male: Lee Beom-soo
- Hot Drama Star, Female: Kim Min-jung
- Hot Couple: Crown J & Seo In-young
- Hot Online Song: "One More Time" (Jewelry)
- Hot Sports Star: Jang Mi-ran
- Hot Global Star: Park Yong-ha
- Hot CF Star: Lee Kwang-soo, Hong In-young
- Hot Fashionista: Ryoo Seung-bum
- Hot Sweet Music: "Kissing You" (Girls' Generation)
- Hot Club Music: "So Hot" (Wonder Girls)
- Hot Style Icon: Lee Hyori
- Hot Performance Musician: Lee Hyori
- Hot Trend Musician: Big Bang
- Hot New Star: Shinee
- Hot Schoolgirl: Sohee of Wonder Girls
- Hot Radio DJ: Kangin & Taeyeon "Good Friends"
- Hot Character Star: Jun Jin
- Hot Sitcom Star: Baek Sung-hyun
- Hot Cable Show: Infinite Girls on MBC Every 1
- Hot Comment: Crown J's "A~"
- Hot Comeback Star: Roh Moo-hyun, ex-president
- Hot Variety Star: Yoo Jae-suk
- Hot Issuemaker: American beef

== 2007 ==
- Most Popular Group: Super Junior
- Best Performance: Super Junior
- Best Dresser: Super Junior
- Best Bad Boy: Kangin
- Best Pretty Boy: Kim Hee-chul
- Best Vocal: SG Wannabe's Kim Jin-ho
- Best DJ: Haha
- Best Comedian: Kang Yoo-mi & Yoo Se-yoon
- Best Body: Hyun Young
- Best Entertainer: Hyun Young
- Best Kiss: Choi Min-yong and Seo Min-jung
- Best New Star: Jung Il-woo
- Best Drama Star: Jung Il-woo
- Best Female Artist: Ivy
- Top Model: Song Kyung-ah
- Best Alien: Andre Kim
- Best Casting: Lee Soon-jae
- Best Couple: Kim Bum & Kim Hye-sung
- Best Drama Star: Park Hae-mi
- Best Female Actress: Kim Ah-joong
- Best Style: Gong Yoo & Lee Hyori
- Best Male Artist: Se7en
- Best Male Actor: Jo In-sung
- Best CF Star: Jo In-sung
- Best Photogenic: Jo In-sung

== Most winners ==
Rank	1st	2nd	3rd	4th
Artist	Lee Hyori	Super Junior	2PM	2NE1, Jo In-sung, Suzy
Total awards	7	5	4	3

== See also ==
- K-pop
