= KT SkyLife =

South Korean broadcasting company

- Type: Public
- Traded as: KRX: 053210
- Industry: Telecommunication Media
- Founded: 2001
- Headquarters: 918-1 Mok-dong, Yangcheon-gu, Seoul, South Korea
- Key people: Choi Young-Beom CEO
- Products: Direct broadcast satellite Pay TV services & Programming
- Owner: KT Corporation : 50.00% KBS : 6.78%
- Number of employees: 368 (2020.12)
- Parent: KT Corporation
- Subsidiaries: KT ENA; KT HCN
- Website: skylife.co.kr (archived)

KT SkyLife (Korean: KT스카이라이프) is a satellite broadcasting provider in South Korea. It is a subsidiary of KT Corporation.
