= Home (Roy Kim album) =

Studio album by Roy Kim
- Released: October 8, 2014
- Recorded: 2014
- Genres: Acoustic; folk; pop
- Length: 34:06
- Language: Korean
- Label: CJ E&M Music
- Producers: Ahn Seok-jun (exec.); Jung Ji-chan

Roy Kim chronology
Love Love Love (2013)	Home (2014)	The Great Dipper (2015)

Singles from Home
- 1. "Home" Released: October 8, 2014

Home (sometimes stylized as HOME) is the second Korean studio album by South Korean singer-songwriter Roy Kim, released and distributed on October 8, 2014, through CJ E&M Music. The album features nine tracks in total, and produced a top-five hit which shares the same name as the title of the album. As of July 2016, Home has sold over 12,000 physical copies and about 800,000 individual track downloads in Kim's native country (see Roy Kim discography).

== Background ==
In February 2014, while Kim was studying at Georgetown University, it was announced that he had signed his exclusive contract with CJ E&M Music and had plans to release his second full-length album in the autumn of that year. In June 2014, Kim confirmed that he had begun working on the album through a handwritten letter to fans, saying "I'm preparing my second album so please just wait a little more!" In September, the album entitled Home was officially announced and given an October release date.

Home involved participation from numerous musicians, including Eric Darken, Dan Needham, Gary Lunn, Marc Urselli, and Sungha Jung.

== Release and reception ==
On September 21, 2014, Kim uploaded an acoustic performance of the song "12 O'Clock" from his debut studio album, Love Love Love (2013), onto his official YouTube channel, stating "2nd album coming real soon. Next full moon" and informing fans of the album's impending release. A teaser image for the album was revealed on September 29, along with a confirmed release date (October 8). The next day, a handwritten image of the album's track list was posted through Kim's Instagram account. On October 2, the official music video teaser for "Home" was released via YouTube.

In prior to the album's release, a lyric video for the song "Nothing Lasts Forever" was uploaded through CJ E&M Music's official YouTube channel. The lyric video, featuring time-lapse footage of auroras, was created in collaboration with South Korean astrophotographer Kwon O-chul. Kim exhibited the video for free at Gwanghwarang, Sejong Center from October 3 to 7.

The entire album was released digitally at 12:00 am KST on October 8, along with the music video for its lead single. Upon release, Home reached number four on the Gaon Weekly Album Chart. As of July 2016, the album has sold over 12,500 copies in Kim's native country.

On October 14, Kim's label surprisingly released a music video for "When Autumn Comes" onto YouTube. The slow one shot music video was directed by music video director Song Won-young, who had also directed the video for the album's title track.

== Singles ==
=== "Home" ===
"Home", the album's title track, is the artist's self-penned song. It is a folk tune with the message of consolation through the lyrics of the song, "I see your sad back hidden behind the flashy lights and busy schedules", "When I hear your footsteps, greeting you with a smile", and "Are you feeling sick anywhere? Was it hard? / Don't worry about me, I just need you to be okay / When your heart is aching, when no one is there for you, just come here". Kim also co-starred in the single's omnibus-style music video, with various actors including Ko Kyu-pil and Lee Chae-eun, as a star who has his inner solitude.

Kim posted a photo he took with his companion dog Sancho, on his Instagram account, stating "This song was written in the perspective of my 14-year-old friend Sancho. I've been happy thanks to him who waits for me and barks at me, at the door of my house whatever happens to me." Kim also stated "As I do, everyone of you might have someone like Sancho. I have nothing but gratitude, hearing people came to know how much such beings mean to them through my music."

The song debuted and peaked at number two on the Gaon Digital Chart. It won the first place on South Korea's televised music shows including Mnet's M! Countdown, and MBC's Show! Music Core, from October 16 to 18, 2014. In Taiwan, "Home" was ranked at number 90 on the Hit FM's Annual Top 100 Singles Chart of that year. Allkpop listed the song's accompanying music video at number six on its list of "Top 50 K-Pop MVs of 2014". As of April 18, 2015, "Home" has sold over half a million digital copies domestically.

== Promotion ==
From October 7 until November 10, 2014, Kim busked in several places with names starting from each letter of the album title. He performed at Mecenatpolis in Hapjeong-dong (H), Omok Park in Mok-dong (O), Marronnier Park (M), and Gukak National High School (E – Everywhere).

Kim began promoting his comeback album on various music programs, starting on Mnet's M! Countdown (October 9). He promoted the lead single on M! Countdown, Simply K-Pop (Arirang TV), Music Bank (KBS), Show Champion (MBC M), Show! Music Core (MBC), Inkigayo (SBS), and The Show (SBS M). On KBS's You Hee-yeol's Sketchbook, Kim performed the title track and "When Autumn Comes", alongside his cover of "Lost Stars" popularized through the 2014 film Begin Again.

On September 25, it was announced that Kim would hold his nationwide live tour entitled "2014 ROYKIM LIVE TOUR HOME" from October 25. Starting at the Olympic Hall, Olympic Park, Seoul, he performed in cities including Daegu, Daejeon, Busan, and Changwon until November 2014, to promote the album.

Kim promoted the album also in Taiwan from November 13 to 15, attending at "ROY KIM 2014 HI FIVE Taipei Fan Meeting" held in celebration of the album's release in the country, with his fans exceeding a thousand.

== Track listing ==
English titles are adapted from the iTunes Store, and credits from Naver Music.

All tracks are written by Kim Sang-woo, except where noted.

No.	Title	Translated title	Length
1.	"Nothing Lasts Forever" (영원한 건 없지만; Yeongwonhan Geon Eopjiman)	Even Though Nothing Lasts Forever	4:02
2.	"When Autumn Comes" (가을에; Gaeure)	In Autumn	3:50
3.	"Home"		3:49
4.	"If You Love Me" (날 사랑한다면; Nal Saranghandamyeon)		3:38
5.	"Now I Know" (잘 있나요 그대; Jal Itnayo Geudae, featuring Jung Ji-chan)	How Are You Doing?	3:21
6.	"Hold On" (롱디; Rongdi)		4:12
7.	"Curtain" (featuring Sungha Jung) (co-written by Jung Ji-chan)		3:15
8.	"Far Away" (멀어졌죠; Meoreojyeotjyo)		4:23
9.	"Thank You" (Bonus track)		3:36
Total length:			34:06

Additional notes:

- "Nothing Lasts Forever" was written while Kim was studying in the United States, inspired by his elder sister's message.
- The title of track 6 is an abbreviation of the word "long-distance relationship".

== Credits and personnel ==
Credits are adapted from the album's liner notes.

Locations

- Recorded at Brownstone Studio, Nashville, TN (drum and bass guitar)
- Recorded at Jane's Place Studio, Nashville, TN (percussion)
- Recorded at Eastside Sound Studios (string)
- Recorded at Booming Sound (all vocals, piano, and Sungha Jung's acoustic guitar)
- Mixed at Musicabal (all tracks)
- Mastered at Metropolis Mastering, London

Personnel

- Sang-woo Kim – vocals (all tracks), lyrics (all tracks), composer (all tracks), backing vocals (tracks 3, 6, 8), album artist (credited as Roy Kim)
- Ji-chan Jung – arranger (all tracks), acoustic guitar (tracks 1, 3–9), keyboard (tracks 1, 3–9), arranging of string (tracks 1, 8), nylon-string guitar (track 1), backing vocals (tracks 3, 8), music producer
- Jun-ho Hong – electric guitar (tracks 1, 3–6, 8–9)
- Dan Needham – drum (tracks 1, 3–6, 8–9)
- Gary Lunn – bass (tracks 1, 3–6, 8–9)
- Eric Darken – percussion (tracks 1, 7)
- New York String Session Orchestra – recording of string (tracks 1–4, 8)
  - Antoine Silverman, Entcho Todorov, Erin Benim, Suzy Perelman, Lisa Matricardi, Hiroko Taguchi, Monica Davis, Meghan Todt – violin
  - Jonathan Dinklage, Phil Payton, Chris Cardona – viola
  - Richard Locker, Julian Schwartz – cello
- In-young Bak – arranging and conducting of string (tracks 2–4)
- Dong-ha Kim – trumpet (track 4)
- Han-jin Lee – trombone (track 4)
- Sungha Jung – acoustic guitar (track 7)
- Jae-jung Bak – backing vocals (track 8)
- Young-jo Im – arranging of string (track 8)
- Seok-jun Ahn – executive producer
- Baeho "Bobby" Shin – recording of drum, bass guitar, and percussion
- David Donghwa Han – recording assistant
- Marc Urselli – recording of string
- Pyung-wook Lee – recording of all vocals, piano, and Sungha Jung's acoustic guitar
- Hyun-jung Go – mixing (all tracks)
- Stuart Hawkes – mastering

== Charts and sales ==
=== Weekly charts ===
Chart (2014–present)	Peak position
South Korean Albums (Gaon)	4

=== Monthly charts ===
Chart (2014–present)	Peak position
South Korean Albums (Gaon)	12

=== Year-end charts ===
Chart (2014)	Position
South Korean Albums (Gaon)	113

=== Sales ===
Country	Sales
South Korea (Gaon)	12,500

== Awards and nominations ==
=== Annual music awards ===
Year	Award	Category	Recipient	Result
2014	16th Mnet Asian Music Awards	Best Male Artist	Roy Kim	Nominated
2014	16th Mnet Asian Music Awards	Best Vocal Performance – Male	"Home"	Nominated

=== Music program awards ===
Song	Program	Date
"Home"	M! Countdown (Mnet)	October 16, 2014
"Home"	Show! Music Core (MBC)	October 18, 2014

== Release history ==
Region	Date	Format	Edition	Label	Ref.
South Korea	October 8, 2014	CD; digital download		CJ E&M Music	
Worldwide	October 8, 2014	Digital download		CJ E&M Music	
Taiwan	October 8, 2014	CD		CJ E&M Music	
Taiwan	October 31, 2014	CD+DVD	Deluxe (with HI FIVE Fan Meeting VIP Pass)	Warner Music Group	
Taiwan	November 15, 2014	CD+DVD		Warner Music Group	
