= Roy Kim =

South Korean singer (born 1993)

- 김상우
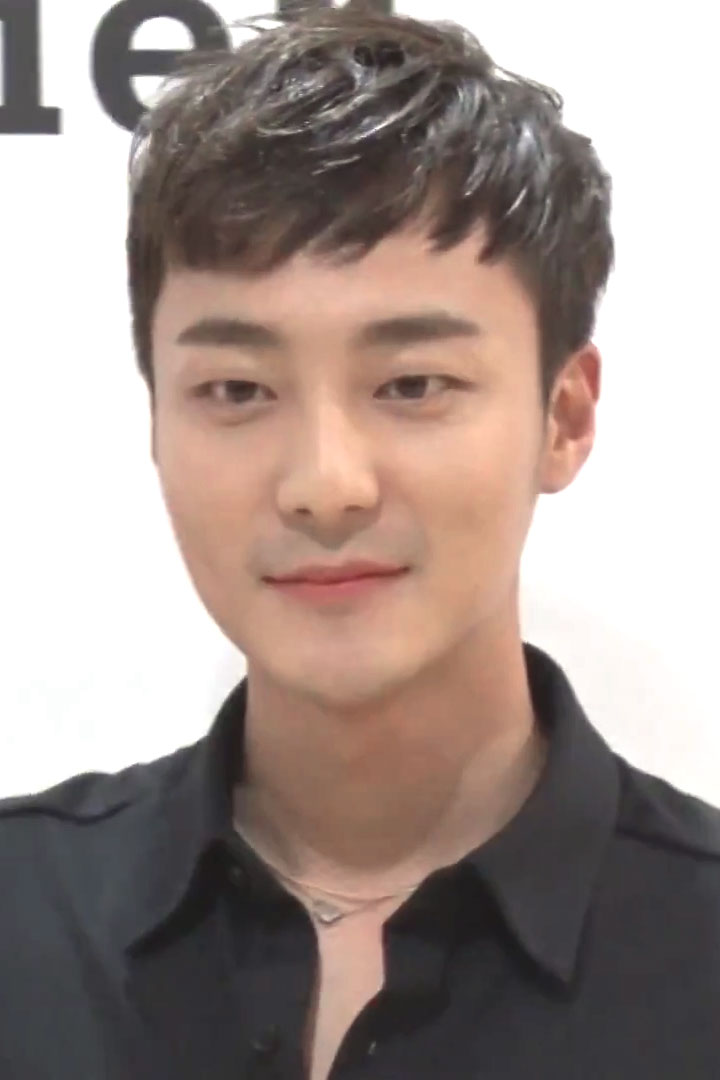
- Roy Kim in 2018
- Born: Kim Sang-woo; July 3, 1993 (age 33); Seoul, South Korea
- Occupations: Singer-songwriter; radio presenter
- Musical career
- Genres: Acoustic; ballad; folk; pop
- Instruments: Vocals; guitar
- Years active: 2012–present
- Labels: Wake One; Warner Music Taiwan
- Website: Official website

Korean name
- Hangul: 김상우
- Hanja: 金相佑
- RR: Gim Sangu
- MR: Kim Sangu

Kim Sang-woo (Korean: 김상우; born July 3, 1993), known professionally as Roy Kim (로이킴), is a South Korean singer-songwriter and radio presenter. He began his singing career after winning the television talent show Superstar K 4 in 2012.

Kim officially debuted with the studio album, Love Love Love (2013), which included the hit single "Bom Bom Bom." The album garnered Kim awards for best new artist at the 15th Mnet Asian Music Awards and the 2014 Golden Disc Awards. Kim followed up his first album with the studio albums, Home (2014) and The Great Dipper (2015), and the extended play, Blooming Season (2017). He has also contributed to soundtracks for television series including Reply 1994, Pinocchio, Another Miss Oh, and Guardian: The Lonely and Great God. As of October 2026, Kim has sold over 12 million digital downloads in his native country.

== Early life and education ==
Roy Kim was born Kim Sang-woo in Seoul, South Korea, on July 3, 1993. His father is a former executive of Seoul Takju, a prominent makgeolli liquor manufacturer. His mother is an artist. Jung Yoon-hye, a former member of the girl group Rainbow, is Kim's cousin.

During his elementary and middle school years, Kim attended Kyung Bok Elementary School and Whimoon Middle School. He was sent to Asheville, North Carolina, in the United States to attend Asheville School, which he graduated from in 2012.

Kim was accepted to attend Georgetown University in Washington, D.C., in 2012, but he delayed his enrollment to audition for Superstar K 4. He entered his first year at Georgetown in 2013 and alternated between attending school in the United States and pursuing his music career in South Korea. He was majoring in sociology, which he said is "helpful for writing lyrics." In May 2019, Kim denied preparing for Georgetown graduation ceremony, and returned to Korea to face the Burning Sun scandal's investigators after finishing his final exam. Despite the investigation, the university granted an undergraduate degree to Kim.

== Career ==
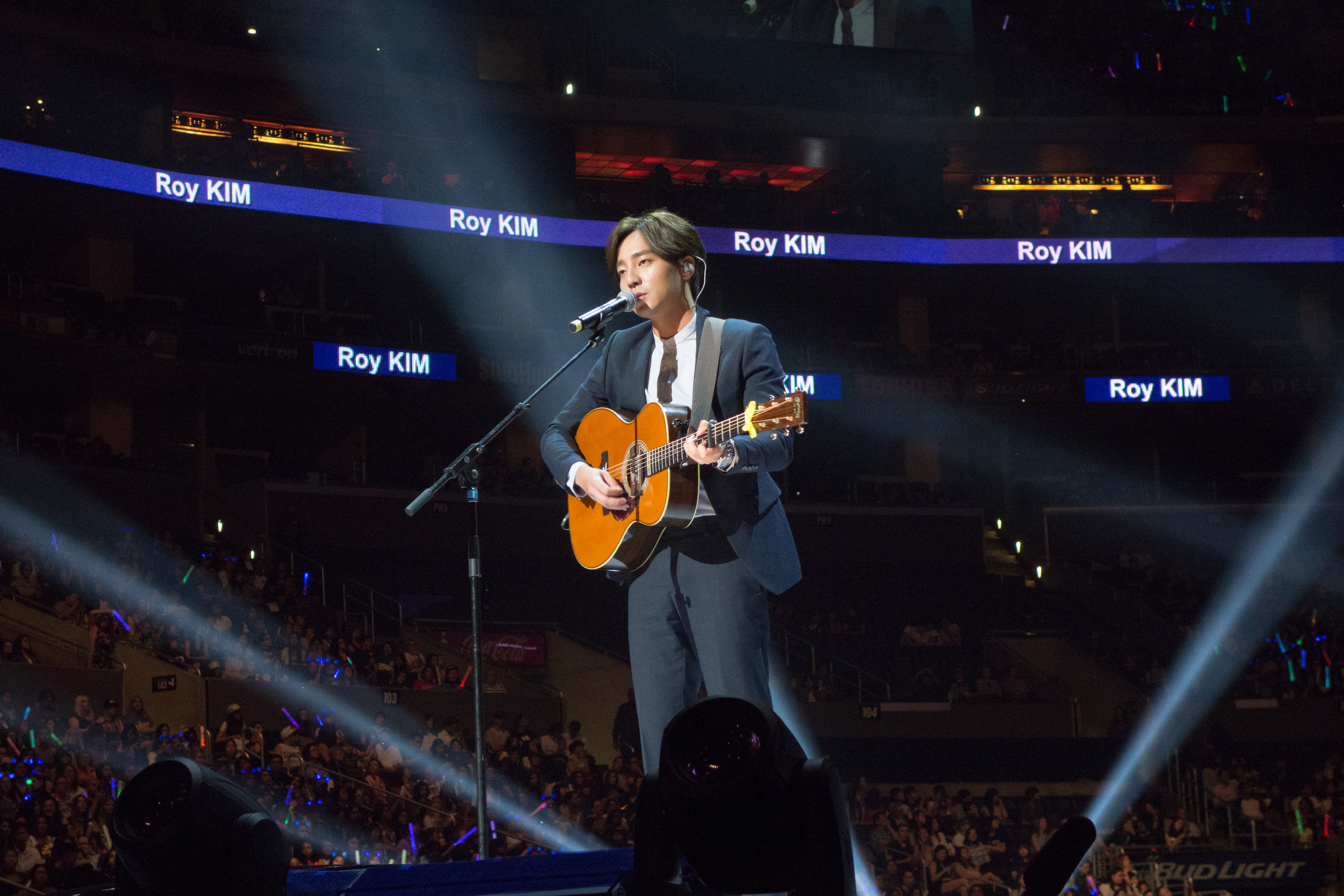
Kim performing at KCON in 2015

In 2012, Kim auditioned for Mnet's television talent show Superstar K 4 (the South Korean equivalent of American Idol). He was ultimately the season's winner, out of nearly two million applicants. Following his win, he performed at the 2012 Mnet Asian Music Awards in Hong Kong.

In June 2013, Kim released his first album, Love Love Love, which included the "mega-hit" single "Bom Bom Bom." The single topped the Gaon Digital Chart for two weeks and Billboard's K-pop Hot 100 for three weeks after its release. The album's title track, "Love Love Love" reached No. 2 on the Gaon chart and No. 4 on the Billboard chart. Following the release of his first album, Kim won several awards, including Best New Male Artist at the 2013 Mnet Asian Music Awards, 20's Booming Star at the 2013 Mnet 20's Choice Awards, and Rookie of the Year and the Popularity Award at the 2014 Golden Disc Awards.

Kim released his second album, Home, in October 2014. The album's lead single, also named "Home," was a success, topping South Korea's real-time music charts upon its release and reaching No. 2 on the Gaon Digital Chart. That month, Kim embarked on a South Korean tour to promote the album. In November, he contributed to the soundtrack for the television series Pinocchio, with the song, "Pinocchio," for which he won Best Original Soundtrack at the 2015 APAN Star Awards and Favorite Foreign Artist at the 2015 Hito Music Awards in Taiwan. Kim also became the first foreign artist to perform at the Hito Music Awards since they were established in 2003.

In December 2015, Kim released his third album, The Great Dipper. The album's title track was a ballad, which was a departure from Kim's previous acoustic folk singles. At the end of the year, Kim performed at three solo concerts in Seoul, all of which had sold out before the release of his album.

Kim released his first extended play, Blooming Season (Korean: 개화기), in May 2017. In February 2018, he released the single "Only Then," which topped Korean music charts upon its release, and which received a Platinum certification for digital sales by Gaon in November. For the song, Kim won Best Ballad at the 2018 Melon Music Awards, Best Male Artist at the 2018 Mnet Asian Music Awards, and a Digital Bonsang at the 2019 Golden Disc Awards.

In September 2022, it was confirmed that Kim would release a new album in October, the first after his discharge from military service. On October 7, 2022, Kim released a photo of his new single "Take Me Back In Time" via his official SNS. The single was released on October 14. This pre-release single will be followed by the release of his fourth full album And on October 25.

== Personal life ==
=== Military service ===
On May 27, 2020, Kim released his self-produced single "Linger On", which was his first single in 1 year and 8 months, and was his last single before enlisting into the Republic of Korea Marine Corps for his mandatory military enlistment on June 15. Kim was discharged after completing his full term in December 2021, with Kim stating "The time I spent in the Marine Corps was filled with invaluable memories and lessons that I cannot exchange for anything."

== Discography ==
- Love Love Love (2013)
- Home (2014)
- The Great Dipper (2015)
- And (2022)

== Concerts and tours ==
=== Headliner ===
Year	Title	Country	No. of shows	Ref.
Nationwide tours
2013	1st Concert Tour: Love Love Love	South Korea	5	
2014	Live Concert Tour: Home	South Korea	6	
2017	Live Concert Tour: "Blossom"	South Korea	5	
Special concerts
2013	Mini Concert: Our Winter	South Korea	2	
2014	Mini Concert: Our Winter #2	South Korea	2	
2015	Year-End Concert: The Great Dipper	South Korea	3	
2016	Mini Concert: Comma	South Korea	9	
2016	Roy Kim Live in Taiwan	Taiwan	1	
2016	Roy Kim Showcase 2016 in Malaysia	Malaysia	1	
2016	Year-End Concert: ROcumentarY	South Korea	3	
Collaborative concerts
2014	Someday in June (with 10cm and Junggigo)	South Korea	1	
2015	Someday Stage: Campus Blues (with One More Chance)	South Korea	2	

=== Participant ===
Year	Title	Country	Ref.
Concerts and tours
2012	G-Market Concert: StayG4	South Korea	
2012	Superstar K4 Top 12 Concert	South Korea	
2013	Superstar K5 All-Star Concert	South Korea	
2014	Superstar K6 All-Star Concert	South Korea	
2015	Global Citizen 2015 Earth Day	United States	
2016	Fever Festival Concert	South Korea	
Music festivals
2013	Ansan Valley Rock Festival	South Korea	
2014	Soundberry Festa	South Korea	
2014	Delicious Music City: Chicken & Beer Carnival	South Korea	
2015	Seoul Jazz Festival	South Korea	
2015	KCON	United States	
2015	Someday Festival	South Korea	
2015	KCON Jeju	South Korea	
2016	Beautiful Mint Life	South Korea	
2016	Red Carrat Music Festival	South Korea	
2016	Daegu Folk Festival	South Korea	
2016	My FM Dare Dare Come 2.0 Go!	Malaysia	

== Radio presenting ==
Year	Channel	Title	Notes
2013	MBC FM4U	Kim Shin-young's Hope Song at Noon	Temporary co-host with Jung Joon-young (January 28 – March 3)
2013	MBC FM4U	Roy Kim and Jung Joon-young's Best Friend	May 6 – August 18
2014	MBC Standard FM	Younha's Starry Night	Temporary host (September 29 – October 5)
2015	MBC Standard FM	Jung Joon-young's Simsimtapa	Special host (October 7–8)
2015	Melon Radio	RoyStar FM	December 1, 8
2015	KBS Cool FM	K-Pop Planet	December 13
2016	SBS Power FM	Jang Ye-won's A Night like Tonight	Special host (August 1–7)

== Filmography ==
=== Television series ===
Year	Title	Role	Notes	Ref.
2015	The Producers	Cindy's anti-fan	Cameo (episode 10)	

=== Television shows ===
Year	Title	Role	Notes	Ref.
2012	Superstar K4	Contestant, winner	15 episodes (1–15)	
2012	Superstar K4 Backstage	Himself	7 episodes (October 19 – December 7)	
2012–2013	Superstar K4ever Special Track	Himself	8 episodes (December 21 – February 8)	
2014	Connection 2014	Narrator	Co-narrator with Bae Suzy (June 13 – July 4)	
2014	Somesing	Co-host, performer	with Kang Ho-dong, Kim Jung-eun, and Kim Yeon-woo (September 9–10)	
2014	First Day of Work	Cast member	5 episodes (1–5)	
2016	King of Mask Singer	Contestant	6 episodes (65–70) as "Romantic the Dark Knight": June 26 – July 3: The 33rd Generation Mask King; July 10–17: The 34th Generation Mask King; July 24–31: Eliminated by the 35th Generation Mask King challenger	
2016	Daddy and Me	Cast member	5 episodes (6–10)	
2016	Celebrity Bromance	Cast member	Co-starred with Jung Joon-young (August 9, 16, 23, 30)	
2017	Fantastic Duo	Contestant, performer	2 episodes (21, 22)	
2018	Begin Again	Cast member	Season 2	
2023	Super Karaoke Survival: VS	Producer	with Parc Jae-jung	

=== Music video ===
Year	Song title	Artist(s)
2013	"The Day to Love"	Lee Seung-chul

== Ambassadorship ==
Year	Title	Campaign organizer	Ref.
2015	Girls' Education Campaign at KCON 2015	UNESCO/CJ E&M	
2016	The Happy Place of Sharing and Donation, G+Star Zone	Gangnam District, Seoul	
