= KT Corporation =

South Korean telecommunication service provider

- Formerly: Korea Telecommunications Authority (1981–2002)
- Type: Public
- Traded as: KRX: 030200; NYSE: KT; LSE: KTCD
- Industry: Telecommunications
- Founded: September 28, 1885; 141 years ago (as Korea Telegrams Hansung Administration); Hansung, Joseon (now Seoul, South Korea); December 10, 1981; 44 years ago (as Korean Telecommunications Authority, KTA); Seongnam, South Korea
- Headquarters: Bundang District, Seongnam, South Korea
- Key people: Kim Young-shub (CEO)
- Products: Fixed line Mobile telephony Internet services Digital television Credit card Entertainment; Education; Real estate Infrastructure; Sports; Software
- Revenue: KRW 24,342 billion (2019)
- Owner: Hyundai Motor Group (7.89%) Government of South Korea through the National Pension Service (7.51%) Shinhan Bank (5.64%)
- Number of employees: 23,372 (December 2019)
- Subsidiaries: KTDS; KTH; KTP; KTN; KT Submarine; KT Telecop; KT Capital; KT Rental; KTM&S; Genie Music; KT Studio Genie; Nasmedia; KT CS; KT IS; KT SkyLife; KT Wibro Infra
- Website: corp.kt.com

KT Corporation (Hangul: 주식회사 케이티), formerly Korea Telecom, is a South Korean telecommunications company, mobile network operator (MNO) and mobile virtual network operator (MVNO). KT is the large wireless carrier in South Korea, with 13.5 million subscribers as of Q4 2023.

The formerly fully-state-owned firm (the government's National Pension Service currently owns 12.19% shares and is the largest shareholder) is South Korea's first telecommunications company and is a major supplier of the local landline and broadband internet market, serving about 90 percent of the country's fixed-line subscribers and 45 percent of high-speed Internet users. After selling its wireless affiliate Korea Mobile Telecom in 1994, KT returned to the wireless market with the creation of PCS carrier KTF in January 1997.

The company's merger with KTF, its wireless subsidiary, in 2009 made it the country's ninth largest chaebol (conglomerate) with nearly 24 trillion won in assets as of 2009.

In January 2011, KT launched unified brand "Olleh" for both fixed-line and cellular broadband services. However in 2016, they decided to revert to "KT" for landline and cellular broadband services.

== Company overview ==
Founded in 1981 as a public utility, KT played a major role in Korea's development in the information technology hub sector. KT sold its wireless affiliate in 1994, founding another in 1996 and becoming, along with LG Dacom, one of Korea's earliest Internet service providers. In 2001 KT acquired struggling broadband provider Thrunet, then the largest broadband company in Korea, which paved the way for KT to dominate the broadband market. In 2009, KT merged with its wireless subsidiary KTF, paving the way to the integration of landline and cellular services. Ever since KT introduced the Apple iPhone to South Korea, it has been constantly seeking new business areas, such as media, e-commerce, and global business partnerships. The company has a well-distributed shareholder structure under which the National Pension Service (NPS) is the largest shareholder (6.81% as of December 31, 2012), but NPS holds no managerial rights over the company. Under the current shareholder structure, no controlling shareholder exists.

== History and milestones ==
Logo used from 1982 to 1990

Logo used from 1991 to 2001

Logo used from 2001 to 2009

The corporation origin dates back to the late 19th century.

=== Before privatization ===
- December 10, 1981: The company becomes incorporated as KTA.
- 1984: Tenth in the world to develop the electronic switch TDX-1.
- 1987: Nationwide automated long-distance network completed.
- 1991: Company renamed Korea Telecom.
- 1993: Total of approximately 20 million telephone lines installed (only 4.5 million existed in 1982), laying groundwork for the emerging information society.
- 1995: Mugunghwa Satellite No. 1 launched.
- 1996: Mugunghwa Satellite No. 2 launched.
- 1996: PCS and CT-2 license acquired. KT Freetel (wireless carrier) founded.
- 1997: Status changed from organization which has +50% state funding to one with a state funding of smaller scale (below 50%).
- October 1, 1997: The new Public Corporation Business Structure Improvement & Privatization Act applied to KT (no longer exempted owing to the change in company status).
- 1998: Headquarters relocated from Jongno-gu, Seoul, to Bundang-gu, Gyeonggi Province.
- December 1998: Newly listed on stock exchange.
- 1999: Mugunghwa Satellite No. 3 launched.
- June 2000: Managerial rights of Hansol M.com acquired.
- December 2000: IMT-2000 license acquired.
- April 2001: Caller ID (CID) service launched.

=== After privatization ===
- May 2001: Plans for privatization announced. Celebrated 20th anniversary and changed name from Korea Telecom to KT. KT's telephone exchanges restructured into regional branch offices. "Let's" launched as the new company slogan.
- 2002: Privatization of company finalized.
- 2002: KT ICOM, the third-generation mobile unit of KT Corp., merges with KT Freetel, the mobile subsidiary of KT Corp., to form a new company opening on March 1, 2003.
- June 14, 2003: Alcatel Space announced its $148.5 million contract with KT Corp. to build Koreasat 5, South Korea's first civil-military communications satellite.
- October 1, 2003: KT Corp. cuts 12.6% of its workforce due to stagnant sales and rivalry to save up to $280 million US dollars.
- October 31, 2003: KT Corp. reports its first quarterly loss in seven years. The severance payments of cutting 12.6% of its workforce played a role in the loss.
- 2005: According to Fair Trade Commission data, KT as a corporate group that holds 12 subsidiaries and total assets of 29.315 trillion won, ranked 8th among Korea's conglomerates.
- December 28, 2005: Launched inter-Korean telecommunication services and opened KT branch office in North Korea's Gaesung industrial complex.
- January 2009: Six days after inauguration as the new Chairman of KT, Suk-Chae Lee announced plans for KT-KTF merger at press conference.
- March 2009: Received conditional approval from Korea Communications Commission (KCC) on KT-KTF merger.
- April 2009: Debut of Qook, a service bundle brand. "Ann" landline phone, "Megapass" broadband and "Mega TV" IPTV services were renamed "Qook Phone," "Qook Internet" and "Qook TV," respectively.

=== After KT-KTF merger ===
- June 1, 2009: KT and its wireless subsidiary KTF merged to form a new unified KT.
- July 2009: Previous company slogan "All New" replaced with "Olleh Management,"and "Olleh KT" officially launched as the new CI.
- November 2009: Launch of Qook and Show broadband services.
- November 2009: Became first local carrier to launch Apple's iPhone in Korean market.
- December 2009: Launched the first 3W (Wi-Fi, WiBro, WCDMA) smartphone "Show Omnia" in Korean market.
- June 2010: Launched "uCloud", a cloud-based storage service.
- August 2010: Company's internet services relaunched under the name "Olleh" in alignment with company slogan.
- August 31, 2010: KT included as Dow Jones Sustainability World Index company.
- September 10, 2010: Launched Apple's iPhone 4 in Korean market and unlimited 3G data plan.
- November 11–12, 2010: the official telecommunications service provider for the G20 Seoul summit.
- January 25, 2011: Fixed-line "Qook" and cellular "Show" broadband services were unified under the "Olleh" brand. They were renamed "Olleh Home" and "Olleh Mobile," respectively.
- February 10, 2011: Acquired 20.05% of BC Card shares, emerging as the second-largest shareholder.
- January 3, 2012: KT launched its LTE service.
- September 2012: KT was awarded the Global Supersector Leader for Telecommunications (number 1 company in terms of sustainable business practices) by Dow Jones Sustainability Indexes for two consecutive years.
- December 4, 2013: KT and Docomo's business relationship strengthens as both companies extend the business tie-up to January 2017.
- 2014: KT's 12 million customers' data were hacked.
- 2014: KT and the Rwandan government announced the agreement for the establishment of Rwanda Olleh Services Ltd, a joint venture responsible for providing improved online services.
- 2015: In late 2015, former KT president Suk-Jae Lee denies the charges of trust and embezzlement allegations.
- 2016: KT Corp. plans to provide 5G services at the 2018 Winter Olympics held at PyeongChang, South Korea. At the event, KT claims that its wireless platforms would be able to provide service to 250,000 devices at once.
- 2017: In participation of the government-led programme, KT Corp. opens up 100,000 Wi-Fi hotspots, also known as access points (AP), mostly in subway trains. The government-led programme's aim is to improve access to public Wi-Fi.
- 2018: KT Corp. announces its plan to invest 23 trillion won into 5G and new telecommunication technologies over the next five years.
- Sept 2018: KT Corp. launches its 5G Open Lab for testing 5G/IoT-based services which have attracted major corporations such as Samsung, Posco, Hyundai Mobis, Intel, Ericsson, and Nvidia's interest.
- Nov 2018: KT Corp. commercializes 10 Gbit/s-capable broadband internet service for major cities in South Korea, including Seoul, Daegu, and Busan.
- February 25, 2019: A Memorandum of Understanding (MoU) was signed by KT Corp. and Nokia to test 5G technologies such as NFV and network slicing.
- March 25, 2019: KT Corp. signs a 5G commercial contract with Ericsson that will enable all South Korean residents to purchase 5G services starting April 2019.
- May 3, 2019: KT Corp. and Samsung Electronics have signed a deal to supply public safety network solutions to ten major South Korean cities by 2020.
- 2020: At the SatelliteAsia 2020 exposition, the satellite-operating division of KT presented the world's first satellite-5G hybrid router transmission technology.
- 2021: KT Corp. becomes first in South Korea to commercialize 5G standalone (5G SA) technology reports ZDNet. This new 5G standalone technology will help reduce power and latency consumption for users. KT Corp. acquires Epsilon Telecommunications, a South Korean telecommunications company.
- 2024: KT to supply US$450 mln worth of network infrastructure to Microsoft

== Corporate governance ==
KT's Board of Directors (BOD) consists of three non-independent directors and eight outside directors, totalling eleven directors as of March 2012. The outside directors are nominated by the Outside Director Nomination Committee based on their expertise and business leadership, and hold office for less than three years. The BOD chairman is selected from among the outside directors and serves for a one-year term. The BOD consists of five standing subcommittees and two ad hoc subcommittees. If required, additional sub-committees may be set up. The current internal directors are Chang-Gyu Hwang (Chairman & CEO), Hyeon-myung Pyo and Il-yung Kim, and the external directors are Eung Han Kim (Board Chairman), Chun-Ho Lee, Hyun-nak Lee, Byong-won Bahk, Keuk-je Sung, Sang-Kyun Cha, Do-Kyun Song.

== Services ==
=== Wireless ===
As of 2012 KT customers can receive the services on any of radio frequency band assigned, one or more of radio interfaces.

frequency range	Frequency band	Frequency width (MHz)	Generation	Radio interface	License	Notes
850 MHz (819–824, 864–869)	26	2x5	3.9G/4G	LTE/LTE-A	50 billion won, for 10 years	(planned)
900 MHz (905–915, 950–960)	8	2x10	3.9G/4G	LTE/LTE-A		
1800 MHz (1735–1740, 1745–1755, 1830–1850)	3	35	3.9G/4G	LTE/LTE-A		
2100 MHz (1960–1980,2150-2170)	1	2x20	3G, 3.5G, 3.9G, 4G	UMTS/HSPA+, LTE/LTE-A	130 billion won, for 15 years	
2300 MHz (2330–2360)		30	3.9G	WiBro	12.68 billion won, with rural area support, for 7 years, until Mar 2019	
3500 MHz (3500–3600)	n78	100	5G	NR		
28 GHz (26.5–27.3)	n257	800	5G	NR		License revoked.

==== Smartphones and tablets ====
The KT Corp was the first operator to introduce the iPhone to the South Korean market in November 2009. The next generation model sold one million units within four months of its September 2010 launch. KT launched the iPad in November 2010.

==== Wi-Fi hotspots ====
As of June 2015, KT owns and operates more than 140,000 Wi-Fi hotspots under the name "KT Olleh WiFi zones."

==== 4G LTE ====
KT discontinued 2G coverage in January 2012 in the Seoul area, and March 2012 in the rest of South Korea on the 1.8 GHz frequency, which will be reassigned for LTE network branded "Olleh LTE" (올레 엘티이)LTE coverage all over South Korea will be accomplished by June 2012. Dual-band LTE on the 900 MHz will be available in Seoul by the end of 2012.

==== GiGA LTE ====
In June 2015 KT announced it has teamed up with Samsung Electronics to combine Wi-Fi and LTE in a gigabit-speed mobile service called GiGA LTE. The new network is estimated to be 15 times faster than the existing LTE and four times faster than the tri-band LTE-A, the fastest wireless network currently available in the Korean market.

==== TRS ====
KT is the only operator that provides TRS in South Korea, as it merged t-on Telecom in September 2012.

=== Smart Home ===
In the first half of 2011, KT launched the "Kibot", a robot specially developed for the education and entertainment of children. The robot consists of features found on smartphones. In the second half of the year, KT plans to expand beyond voice services.

=== Mobile TV ===
KT launched the Mobile TV app, which enables customers to view live IPTV and video on demand on their smartphones and tablets.

=== Satellite Services ===
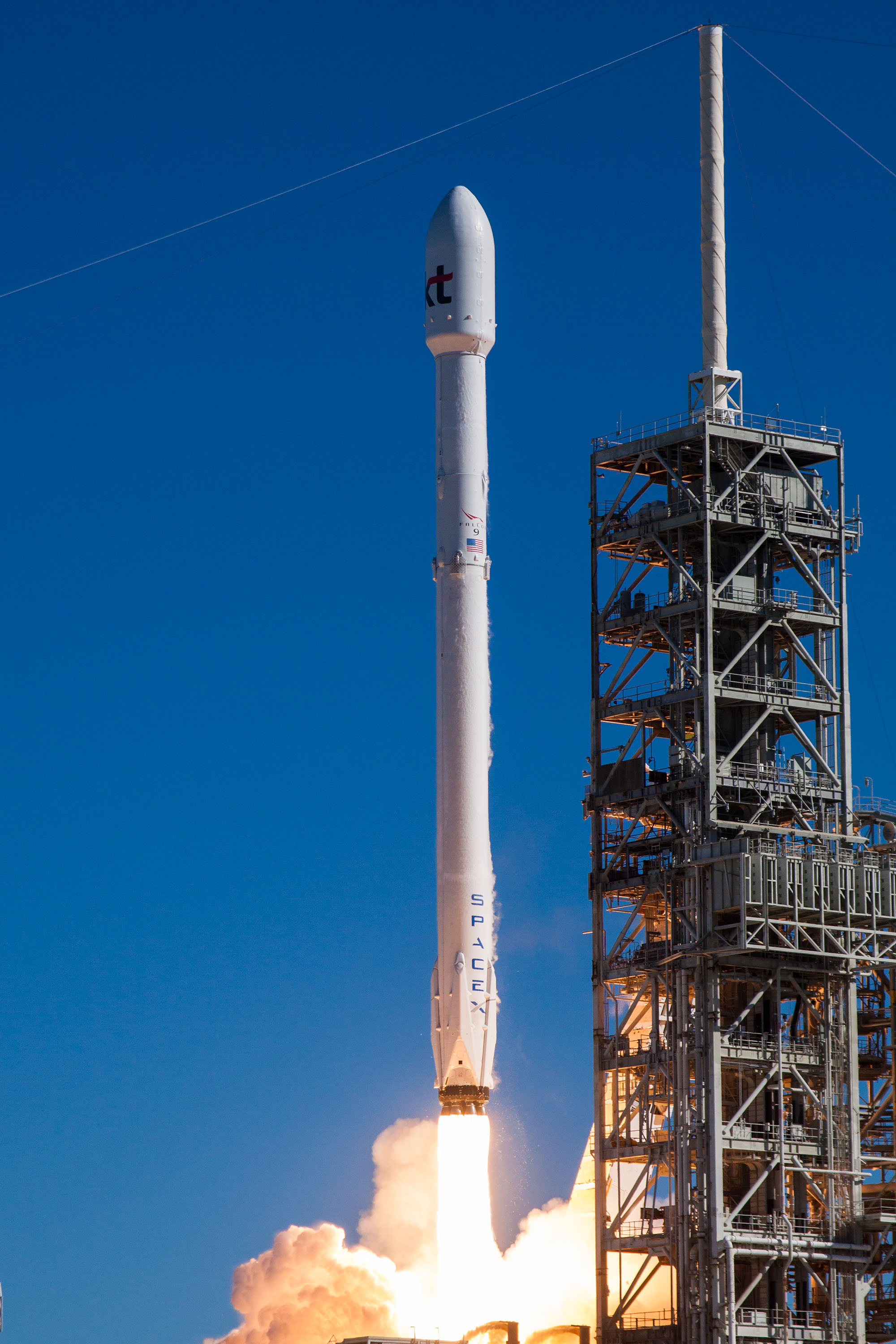
Koreasat 5A launch on board a Falcon 9 rocket in 2017

KT has operated the Koreasat fleet of satellites since 1995. Some of these satellites have been sold to Asia Broadcast Satellite while KT Corporation continues to provide some satellite services.

== Global business ==
=== Bangladesh ===
On April 27, 2017, KT announced the launch of a 'GiGA Island' in Bangladesh, the result of multilateral partnerships with the Bangladesh government, international organizations, public institutions, and non-governmental organizations (NGOs). KT connected the Moheshkhali Island to the inland areas by installing the wireless network technology 'GiGA Microwave' and used copper-based KT's providing giga-level internet solution 'GiGA Wires' to circulate network traffic within the island. With the 'GiGA Microwave', the island could successfully receive 500 Mbit/s internet service, and the 'GiGA Wire' enables the island's internet speed at the most 100 Mbit/s. This enabled more than 30% of the residents in Moheshkhali to communicate with the world through high-speed internet.

=== Brunei ===
In 2012, KT contracted with the Brunei government to establish National Data Center (NDC) and its operation.

=== Mongolia ===
Since 1995, KT has been a major shareholder of Mongolia Telecom. KT dispatched business professionals to Mongolia and operated various training programs. In 2012, KT contracted with the Mongolian government for establishing an Earthquake Disaster Warning System (EDWS).

=== South Africa ===
In 2012, KT and Telkom signed for a consultancy agreement for providing business improvement strategies for mobile sector and iWayAfrica, Telkom's subsidiary for its VSAT business.

=== Rwanda ===
In 2007, KT signed a contract to build a Mobile WiMAX (or WiBro) network in Rwanda. In 2008, KT signed a deal with the Rwandan government to build the backbone its new telecommunication network. In December 2012, KT conducted a national information security project in Rwanda with Korea Internet & Security Agency (KISA). In March 2013, KT signed a contract with the Rwandan government to establish the joint venture to build a nationwide mobile LTE network.

=== Poland ===
On March 21, 2013, KT, Daewoo International Corporation, and the Korea Trade-Investment Promotion Agency (KOTRA) signed an $18 million contract to establish high-speed Internet network in Podlaskie, Poland. On October 3, 2013, the KT consortium signed a Public Private partnership (PPP) with the Mazowieckie province for a $130 million broadband project.

=== United States ===
On June 14, 2017, KT announced that it had signed an MOU with the city of Boston to participate in the Boston Digital Equity Project, a policy that aims to create a better internet environment across the city center. Under the agreement, KT will provide its GiGA Wire technology, a service that offers speeds of up to 1 gigabit per second using copper wire instead of optical cables, leveraging G.hn technology.

=== Uzbekistan ===
In 2007, KT acquired 54.5% of East Telecom, Uzbekistan's second-largest fixedline operator, and 60% of the shares of the WiMAX operator, Super iMAX.

=== Japan ===
KT JAPAN Co., Ltd. was established on March 25, 1999, and is a wholly-owned subsidiary of KT, with the parent company holding a 100% share. The company's diverse primary business operations focus on comprehensive telecommunications and data services, including the International Network Infrastructure Business and the Local Network Infrastructure Business. They are also key providers of data solutions, running a Data Center Business (including Housing) and offering various Cloud Services. Furthermore, KT JAPAN is a major player in mobile connectivity, handling the Roaming Business, the Data Roaming Business, and the sale of SIM cards, with its portfolio rounded out by conducting Overseas Information and Communications Research.

== KT Sports ==
KT Corporation sponsors an e-sport team and a number of sports teams and athletes, some of which were inherited from KTF before the merger. The corporate headquarters of KT Sports is located in Suwon, where its baseball and basketball teams are located.

- Suwon KT Sonicboom (men's basketball) – based in Suwon
- KT Wiz (baseball) – based in Suwon
- KT Rolster (StarCraft II and League of Legends Professional Gaming Teams) – based in Seoul
- KT Shooting Team (sports shooting) – based in Hwaseong
- KT Hockey Team (women's field hockey) – based in Seongnam

In addition to the teams, KT is the main sponsor of the South Korea national football team and several LPGA of Korea Tour golfers. KT was one of the official sponsors of the 2002 FIFA World Cup held in Korea and Japan.

One of KT Corporation's major corporate rivals is SK Telecom. Match-ups between teams owned by both companies are dubbed the "Telecommunications Derby" by the media. The rivalry is contested in esports and men's basketball. When SK owned a baseball team, the term was also applied to match-ups between SK Wyverns and KT Wiz. Due to KT Wiz being a relatively new franchise and having a poor record for much of its early years, the "rivalry" was largely one-sided and given less attention compared to esports and basketball, where such match-ups are generally hotly contested affairs.

== Smart grid investment ==
KT is currently involved in the Jeju Smart Place test bed project led by Korea's Ministry of Trade, Industry and Energy, which is being pursued for the purpose of testing and developing smart grid business models. The project is being conducted on 6,000 households in Jeju island's Gujwa-eup area, and is scheduled to be conducted over a period of 42 months from May 2009 to May 2013. The aim of the project is to provide an integrated energy management service and achieve the means for efficient energy usage by adopting renewable energy sources and energy storage devices. The project is being executed by the KT Consortium, which is composed of KT and fourteen other companies, including Samsung SDI, Hyosung, Samsung Electronics, and four contractors, with the focus being to conduct demonstration tests on electric power-communication convergence business models.

== Controversy ==
=== KT Internet slowdown incident ===
On April 17, 2021, it was revealed that the 10-Gigabit Internet plan used by YouTuber It-seop was actually being serviced at 100 megabit. It-seop released the data on the speed test in the video, after which the controversy was published, and KT users repelled it.

On April 19, 2021, KT explained that "the customer's information was incorrectly transferred due to an error in the process of moving the studio recently" and "For this reason, only 100 megabit would have been provided." Subsequently, KT officially acknowledged and apologized for causing inconvenience to customers at the 6 o'clock meeting.

=== Malware incident ===
In June 2024, following a JTBC investigation, it was revealed that KT remotely installed malware on the computers of 600,000 subscribers in order to throttle, disrupt and monitor their usage of the torrent protocol, a popular peer-to-peer file transfer protocol. A police investigation on the matter is ongoing.

=== 2021 KT Nationwide Network Outage ===
On October 25, 2021, a nationwide KT telecommunications outage occurred for approximately 89 minutes, from 11:16 a.m. to 12:45 p.m., affecting KT subscribers across South Korea. As the disruption coincided with lunchtime, restaurants and other small businesses that relied heavily on card payments experienced significant inconvenience. Banks, hospitals, and other institutions also faced operational disruptions.

On October 28, KT announced that the outage had been caused by a technical error involving a missing command line. During the process of entering routing information for newly installed equipment as part of a network upgrade, a required command was omitted, affecting network equipment nationwide and ultimately disrupting the entire network. Initially, KT attributed the outage to a DDoS attack, but it was later confirmed that no such attack had occurred.

On November 1, KT announced a compensation plan offering subscribers an average of KRW 1,000 each. This was equivalent to approximately 15 hours' worth of service fees, roughly ten times the actual outage duration of 89 minutes. Small business customers were offered a separate compensation scheme, amounting to an average of KRW 7,000–8,000, equivalent to ten days' worth of service fees.
