= Superstar K 4 =

- Season 4
- Promotional poster
- Hosted by: Kim Sung-Joo
- Judges: Lee Seung-Chul; Yoon Mi-Rae; PSY; Yoon Gun
- Winner: Roy Kim
- Runner-up: DickPunks
- Finals venue: Jamsil Indoor Stadium

Release
- Original network: Mnet; KM
- Original release: August 17 – November 23, 2012

Season chronology
- ← Previous; Superstar K 3 Next → Superstar K 5

Superstar K 4 (Korean: 슈퍼스타 K4) is the fourth season of the South Korean television talent show series Superstar K, which premiered on 17 August 2012 on Mnet and aired every Friday night at 11PM KST. Lee Seung-Chul and Yoon Mi-Rae returned as judges, and were joined by singer/songwriter PSY who replaced Yoon Jong-Shin who had been a judge in the last two seasons. 2,083,447 applicants were recorded for this season, surpassing the record set by the previous season.

This program ended on November 23, 2012 with the announcement of Roy Kim as the winner and DickPunks as the runner-up.

== Selection process ==
As with the previous seasons, applicants were able to apply via the internet, phone or in person. However, with this season, the options of applying via KakaoTalk and karaoke also became available.

=== Auditions ===
Preliminary auditions for the 1st, 2nd and 3rd Regionals were held in these cities:

Episode air dates	Audition city	Date	Venue	Tickets to SuperWeek
August 17 – September 7, 2012	Seoul	July 7/8, 2012	Seoul World Cup Stadium	31
August 17 – September 7, 2012	Incheon	June 2, 2012	Incheon Samsan World Gymnasium	15
August 24–31, 2012	Busan	May 5, 2012	Busan Exhibition and Convention Center	19
August 31 – September 7, 2012	Gwangju	May 12, 2012	Gwangju Yeomju Gymnasium	19
August 17, 2012	Wonju	May 19, 2012	Wonju Tattoo Plaza	18
— ^{a}	Daegu	May 28, 2012	EXCO Daegu Exhibition & Convention Center	4
— ^{a}	Daejeon	June 17, 2012	Daejeon Convention Center	0
— ^{a}	Jeju	April 29, 2012	Jeju City Civic Center	2
September 7, 2012^{b}	Los Angeles	June 9, 2012	Hollywood Musicians Institute Concert Hall	0
September 7, 2012	New York City	June 10, 2012	Best Buy Theater	7
— ^{c}	Sydney	September 22, 2011	SMC Conference & Function Centre	0
Total number of tickets to SuperWeek				115

- ^Note a The Daegu, Daejeon and Jeju audition episodes were not aired due to scheduling changes.
- ^Note b The 3rd Regional auditions for the Los Angeles and New York were held together.
- ^Note c Participants of the Sydney audition who made it to the 3rd Regionals were judged at Seoul instead.

== Finalists ==
=== TOP 12 ===
Name/Group Name	Age	Place of Audition	Final Standing
Kye Bum-joo (계범주)	22	Seoul	Top 12
Eddy Kim (에디킴)	24	Wonju	Top 6
DickPunks (딕펑스)	26	Wonju	Runner-up
Roy Kim (로이킴)	20	Seoul	Winner
Volume (볼륨)	27	Seoul	Top 12
An Ye-seul (안예슬)	18	Wonju	Top 9
Yeon Gyu-sung (연규성)	34	Incheon	Top 9
Yoo Seung-woo (유승우)	16	Seoul	Top 6
Lee Ji-hye (이지혜)	18	Seoul	Top 12
Jung Joon-young (정준영)	23	Seoul	Top 3
Honey G (허니지)	29 / 18	Incheon (Honey Brown) / US (Park Ji Young)	Top 7
Hong Dae-kwang (홍대광)	28	Seoul	Top 4

== Finals ==
Due to the adoption of 12 finalists in Superstar K4 compared to 10 and 11 finalists in the previous seasons, the format was changed by which three finalists are eliminated in the first week, and two in the following three weeks till the Top 5 is reached (exceptions including the judges decision to save DickPunks in the Top 7 week). Judge PSY was replaced from the Top 9 week by singer Yoon Gun, due to his decision to commit to promoting his song 'Gangnam Style (강남스타일)' overseas. The elimination of a contestant will be determinant upon who has the lowest number of points: with 60 percent of the points from a live text poll, 30 percent from the judges' decision and 10 percent from a pre-broadcast online poll.

=== Top 12 – First Love ===
Order	Contestant	Song (original artist)	Year	Result
1	Kye Bum-Joo	"Girls' Generation" (Lee Seung-Cheol)	1989	Eliminated
2	Lee Ji-Hye	"천일동안 (For Thousand Days)" (Lee Seung-Hwan)	1995	Eliminated
3	Volume	"Now" (Fin.K.L)	2000	Eliminated
4	Eddy Kim a.k.a. Kim Jung-Hwan	"버스안에서 (In the Bus)" (자자)	1996	Safe
5	Honey G	"비켜줄께 (I'll Move)" (Brown Eyed Soul)	2010	Safe
6	Yeon Kyu-Sung	"예술이야 (It's Art)" (PSY)	2010	Safe
7	DickPunks	"울릉도 트위스트 (Woolung Island Twist)" (이시스터즈)	1968	Safe
8	Hong Dae-Kwang	"노래만 불렀지 (I Just Do Sing)" (Kim Jang-Hoon)	1996	Safe
9	Yoo Seung-Woo	"My Son" (Kim Gun-Mo)	2003	Safe
10	Roy Kim	"다시 사랑한다 말할까 (Saying I Love You Again)" (Kim Dong-Ryul)	2001	Safe
11	Ahn Ye-Seul	"전설 속의 누군가처럼 (The Unwritten Legend)" (Shin Seung-Hoon)	2000	Safe
12	Jung Joon-Young	"매일매일 기다려 (Waiting Everyday)" (티삼스)	1987	Safe

- Group performance: "사랑 만들기 (Making Love)" (Papaya)

=== Top 9 – Rivalry ===
Order	Contestant	Song (original artist)	Year	Result
1	DickPunks	"고추잠자리 (Red Dragonfly)" (Cho Yong-pil)	1981	Safe
2	Yeon Gyu-Sung	"어둠 그 별빛" (Kim Hyun-sik)	1988	Eliminated
3	Hong Dae-Kwang	"이미 넌 고마운 사람" (Kim Yeon-woo)	2003	Safe
4	Honey G	"왜그래" (Kim Hyun-chul)	1995	Safe
5	Roy Kim	"휘파람 (Whistle)" (Lee Moon-sae)	1985	Safe
6	Ahn Ye-Seul	"Sk8er Boi" (Avril Lavigne)	2002	Eliminated
7	Jung Joon-Young	"Bed of Roses" (Bon Jovi)	1992	Safe
8	Eddy Kim a.k.a. Kim Jung-Hwan	"Love Story" (Rain)	2008	Safe
9	Yoo Seung-Woo	"열정 (Passion)" (Se7en)	2004	Safe

- Group performance: "마지막 승부 (The Last Game)" (Kim Min-kyo)

=== Top 7 - Go Back ===
Order	Contestant	Song (original artist)	Year	Result
1	Eddy Kim a.k.a. Kim Jung-Hwan	"I'll Be There" (Jackson 5)	1970	Safe
2	Honey G	"오래된 친구 (Old Friend)" (빛과 소금)	1994	Eliminated
3	DickPunks	"같이 걸을까 (Shall We Walk Together)" (Lee Juck)	2007	Saved
4	Hong Dae-Kwang	"가족(Family)" (Lee Seung-Hwan)	1997	Safe
5	Jung Joon-Young	"그것만이 내 세상 (It's Only My World)" (들국화)	1985	Safe
6	Roy Kim	"청개구리 (Blue Frog)" (PSY)	2012	Safe
7	Yoo Seung-Woo	"말하는대로 (As I Say)" (처진 달팽이)	2011	Safe

- Group performance: "고백 (Confession)" (Delly Spice)

=== Top 6 - My Style ===
Order	Contestant	Song (original artist)	Year	Result
1	Roy Kim	"서울의 달 (The Moon of Seoul)" (Kim Gun-Mo)	2005	Safe
2	Hong Dae-Kwang	"뜨거운 안녕 (Passionate Goodbye)" (Toy)	2007	Safe
3	Eddy Kim a.k.a. Kim Jung-Hwan	"아름다운 강산 (Beautiful Rivers and Mountains)" (Shin Jung-Hyeon)	1972	Eliminated
4	DickPunks	"Muzik" (4Minute)	2009	Safe
5	Jung Joon-Young	"아웃사이더 (Outsider)" (봄여름가을겨울)	1995	Safe
6	Yoo Seung-Woo	"Butterfly" (Jason Mraz)	2008	Eliminated

- Group performance: "그대에게 (To You)" (무한궤도)

=== Top 4 - Audience Song of Choice ===
Order	Contestant	Song (original artist)	Year	Result
1	DickPunks	"연극이 끝난 후 (After the Concert is Over)" (샤프)	1979	Safe
2	Jung Joon-Young	"응급실 (Emergency Room)" (이지)	2005	Safe
3	Roy Kim	"한동안 뜸했었지 (I Was Floating For A While)" (사랑과 평화)	1978	Safe
4	Hong Dae-Kwang	"내 낡은 서랍 속의 바다 (The Sea In My Old Drawer)" (패닉)	1998	Eliminated

- Special Stages: DickPunks and Hong Dae-Kwang: "Girl" (아스피린); Jung Joon-Young and Roy Kim: "Creep" (Radiohead)

=== Top 3 - Judge's Mission / Contestant's Favourite Song ===
Each contestant performed two songs: a song from the judge that each had been assigned to be coached from, and a song of personal choice. For the judge mission, DickPunks were assigned to the mentorship of Yoon Mi-Rae, Jung Joon-Young to Lee Seung-Chul and Roy Kim to Yoon Gun.

Order	Contestant	Song (original artist)	Year	Result
1	Roy Kim	"힐링이 필요해 (October Rain)" (Yoon Gun)	2012	Safe
2	Jung Joon-Young	"잊었니 (Did You Forget?)" (Lee Seung-Chul)	2005	Eliminated
3	DickPunks	"떠나지마 (Please Don't Go)" (Yoon Mi-Rae)	2009	Safe
4	Jung Joon-Young	"첫사랑 (First Love)" (나비효과)	2003	Eliminated
5	DickPunks	"Big Girl (You Are Beautiful)" (Mika)	2007	Safe
6	Roy Kim	"잊어야한다는 마음으로 (A Heart That Should Forget)" (Kim Kwang-Seok)	1992	Safe

=== Top 2 - Song Rendition / Self-Written Song ===
Order	Contestant	Song (original artist)	Year	Result
1	DickPunks	"노는게 남는거야 (Playing Something Memorable)" (Jang Jin)	1995	Runner-up
2	Roy Kim	"누구를 위한 삶인가 (Who are you living for?)" (Leessang)	2006	Winner
3	Roy Kim	"스쳐간다 (Passing by)" (Roy Kim)	2012	Winner
4	DickPunks	"나비 (Butterfly)" (DickPunks)	2010	Runner-up

== Ratings ==
=== Ratings ===
- TNmS

Episode	Broadcast Date	Nationwide Viewership
1	17 August 2012	8.4%
2	24 August 2012	9.2%(+0.8)
3	31 August 2012	9.6%(+0.4)
4	7 September 2012	9.3%(-0.3)
5	14 September 2012	9.2%(-0.1)
6	21 September 2012	9.9%(+0.7)
7	28 September 2012	10.6%(+0.7)
8	5 October 2012	9.9%(-0.7)

- AGB Nielsen Media Research

Episode	Broadcast Date	Nationwide Viewership
1	17 August 2012	6.3%
2	24 August 2012	9.1%(+2.8)
3	31 August 2012	8.3%(-0.8)
4	7 September 2012	7.3%(-1.0)
5	14 September 2012	7.7%(+0.4)
6	21 September 2012	8.9%(+1.2)
7	28 September 2012	10.6%(+1.7)
8	5 October 2012	10.6%(0)
