= Sex trafficking in South Korea =

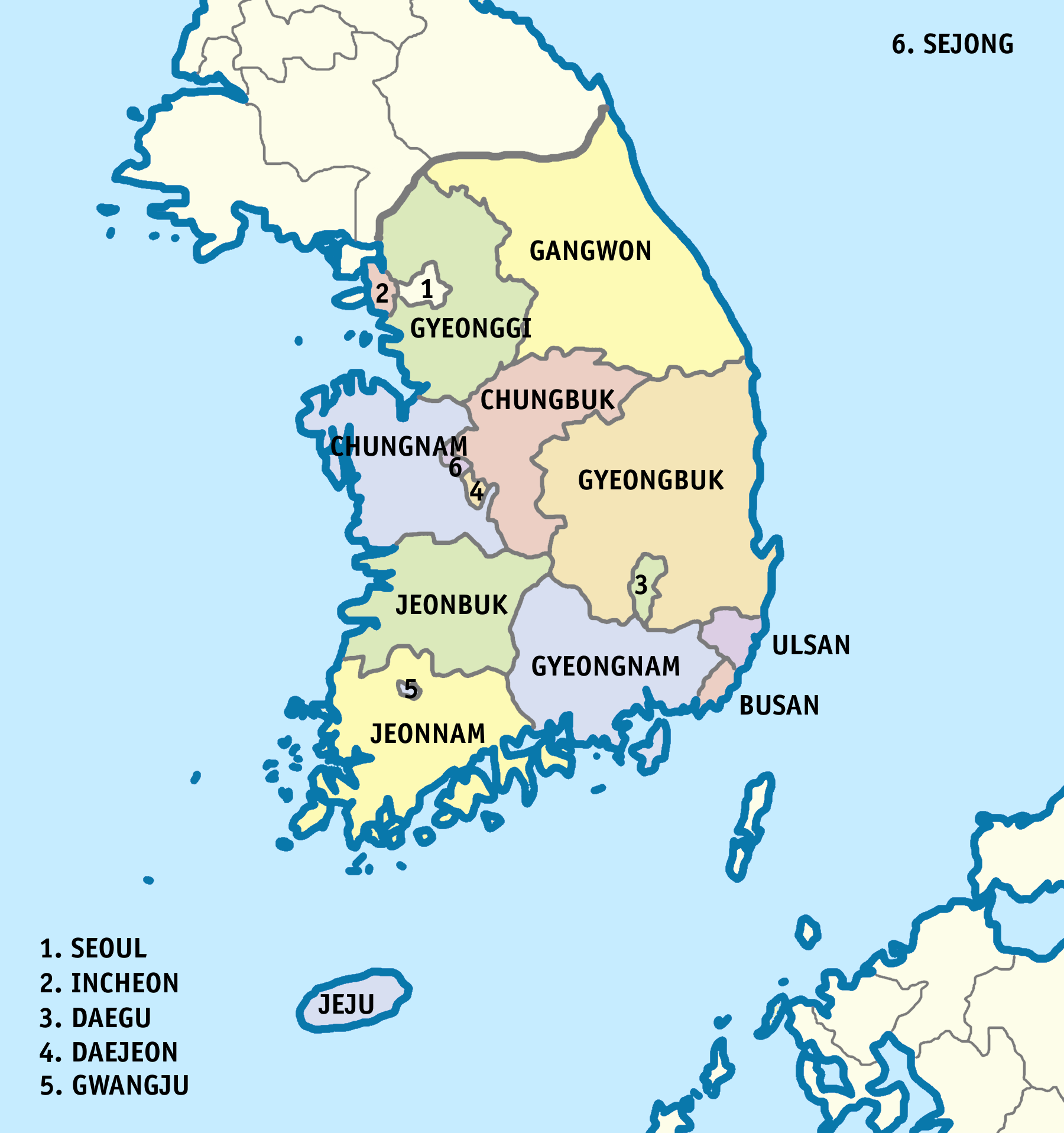
South Korean citizen and foreign victims are sex trafficked into and out of the provinces of South Korea. They are raped and physically and psychologically harmed in brothels, businesses, homes, hotel rooms, and other locations within these administrative divisions.

Sex trafficking in South Korea is human trafficking for the purpose of sexual exploitation and slavery that occurs in the Republic of Korea. South Korea is a country of origin, destination, and transit for sexually trafficked persons. Sex trafficking victims in the country are from South Korea and foreigners.

Male and female perpetrators in South Korea come from a wide range of backgrounds and a number are members of or facilitated by organized crime syndicates and gangs. Some government officials, troops, celebrities, and police, as well as foreigners, have been complicit in sex trafficking in South Korea. For instance, the Burning Sun scandal highlighted the widespread sex trafficking involving Korean celebrities and idols that had been going on for years and the resulting attempts in cover-ups.

The scale of sex trafficking in South Korea is difficult to know because of the underground nature of sex trafficking crimes, the fact that only a small minority of cases are reported to the authorities, and other factors. Traffickers have used the internet websites, email, and apps to lure victims. Methods such as cybersex trafficking have also been used. The South Korean government has been criticized for its lacking anti-sex trafficking efforts and laws. Some South Korean officials have also been accused of being apathetic about the issue.

== Background ==
South Korean citizens, primarily women and girls, have been sex trafficked within South Korea and to other countries in Asia and different continents. Foreign victims are sex trafficked into the country. Children and persons in poverty are particularly vulnerable to sex trafficking. Victims are deceived, threatened, and or forced into prostitution and their passports and other documents are often taken. Many are enslaved in debt bondage.

They suffer physical and psychological abuse and are typically locked up or guarded in poor conditions. Some are murdered. A number contract sexually transmitted diseases from rapes with no condoms. Cybersex trafficking and forced performances in live pornographic videos, as seen in the Nth room case and other incidents, is a growing issue.

Male and female traffickers in South Korea come from all social and economic classes. Traffickers are often members of or facilitated by crime organizations and gangs. Traffickers use internet websites, email, and apps to lure victims. Sex trafficking is linked to the entertainment industry and women and girls are also trafficked to businesses catering to military servicemen and contractors in United States Forces Korea. 'Juicy bars' with sex trafficked victims have been a problem in regards to the United States Military and prostitution in South Korea.

The extent of sex trafficking in South Korea is difficult to know because of the lack of data, clandestine nature of sex trafficking crimes, and other factors.

== History ==
Sex trafficking in South Korea has occurred from ancient times to the present and has been linked to slavery in Korea. During the Japanese invasions of Korea (1592–1598), Japanese combatants carried off and raped captured Koreans. During the Asia–Pacific War, comfort women from Chōsen and other nations were sex trafficked throughout the Empire of Japan.

== U.S. Trafficking in Persons Report ==
According to the 2020 Trafficking in Persons Report issued by the U.S. State Department's Office, the efforts of South Korea to address trafficking are weakened by the absence of a comprehensive national law that defined trafficking consistent with international law.

Some highlights from the report regarding sex trafficking in South Korea:

- From 2015 to 2019, law enforcement arrested more than 500 government officials, including police, for soliciting prostitution, but the government did not report screening these cases specifically for potential trafficking crimes.
- In January 2020, the South Korean Ministry of Justice reported implementing new regulations that would require entertainer visa holders to complete a sex trafficking identification questionnaire when renewing their visa status. However, a local NGO voiced concerns that this would require women to self-identify, and that the fear of persecution and/or deportation made it unlikely they would reveal if they were being trafficked.
- Local governments reportedly encouraged and provided financial assistance to South Korean farmers to pursue marriages to foreign women through brokers, women who may have been exploited in sex trafficking.

== Non-governmental organizations ==
Stand Up Against Sex-Trafficking of Minors, also known as Teens Up, conducts anti-sex trafficking efforts in South Korea.

== Sex trafficking of children ==
The number of child victims trafficked worldwide for sexual exploration or cheap labor on an annual basis is 1.2 million.

In March 2020, Korean news organizations revealed details about a series of cases of sex trafficking through chat rooms, encrypted messaging apps (such as Telegram and Discord). In these cases, "at least 74 women and 16 minors performing forced sex acts for thousands of viewers who paid cryptocurrency to view it". The victims were tortured and referred to as "slaves". This case is closely related to the prevalence and growth of spy cameras in South Korea, also known as "Molka" (몰카).

== Sex trafficking in US military camp towns ==
As South Korea struggled economically after the Korean War, prostitution became vital for the country's economic recovery. After the signing of the 1953 mutual defense treaty, South Korean camp towns, and prostitution for US military personnel, boomed. By 1958, there were around 300,000 sex workers in a country with a population of 22 million people. The South Korean sex workers relied almost entirely on US military personnel for their financial livelihood. With no alternative economic opportunities, many of these women continue as military prostitutes until they became too old to work.

In the mid-1990s, South Korea experienced a period of economic growth, allowing many Korean women to escape prostitution. Since demand for sex workers remained, South Korea's prostitution industry became populated with women from Russia and the Philippines who enter the country on tourist visas organized by pimps. Many of these women were promised a well-paying job but are then forced to engage in prostitution at camp towns, often with debt bondage that ensures they continue working as prostitutes.

== Related media ==
Save My Seoul, a documentary created in 2017, follows two Korean American brothers who investigate prostitution and sex trafficking in Seoul, South Korea. The brothers partnered with pimps, johns and sex workers, and used hidden cameras, to document the complex web of the sex trade in Seoul. They conclude that the rampant underground sex industry is due in large part to the Korean culture, which stigmatizes, criminalizes and turns a blind eye to the sex trade in South Korea.

== See also ==
- Burning Sun scandal
- Molka
- Sexualization and sexual exploitation in K-pop
