= Burning Sun scandal =

2019 South Korean media sex scandal

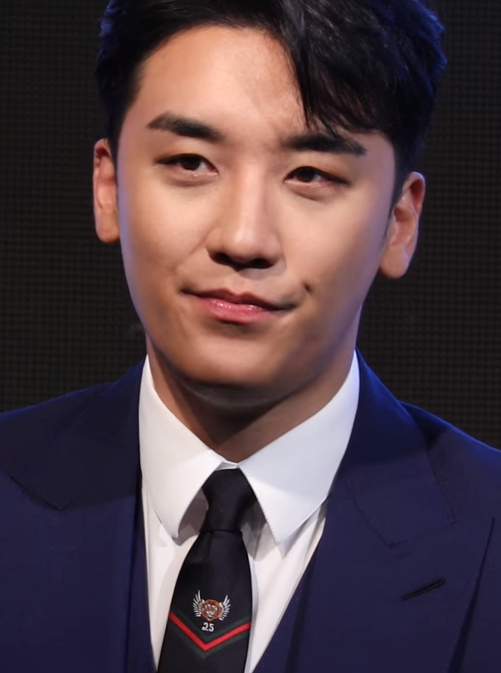
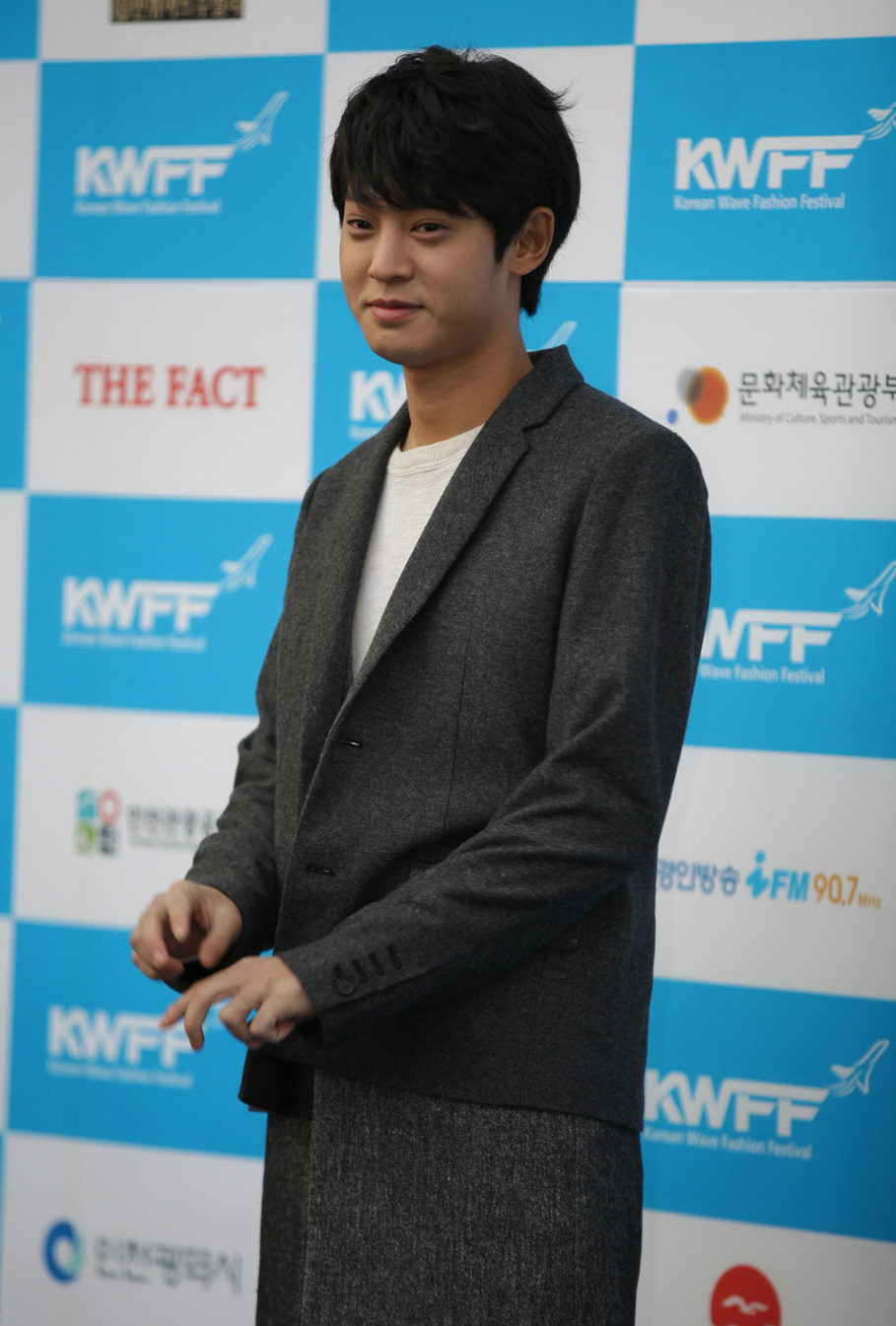
- Seungri, 2018 and Jung Joon-young, 2015; Main Korean idols involved in the Burning Sun scandal and the Jung Joon-young KakaoTalk chatrooms scandal.
- Native name: 버닝썬 게이트
- English name: Burning Sun scandal
- Date: February 23, 2018 – February 17, 2019
- Duration: 11 months – closed during investigation
- Venue: Burning Sun nightclub inside Le Méridien Hotel
- Location: 120 Bongeunsa-ro, Gangnam-gu, Seoul 06124, South Korea
- Also known as: Burning Sun gate
- Type: Entertainment, sex trafficking, and sex ring
- First reporter: Kim Sang-kyo
- Participants: Burning Sun co-CEO Lee Sung-hyun (11); Burning Sun co-CEO Lee Moon-ho (9, 11); Seungri (1-7); Yuri Holdings CEO Yoo In-seok (1, 4, 6); Yang Hyun-suk (1, 2, 3); Former Gangnam police officer Kang (12); Senior SMPA police official Yoon Gyu-geun (12, 13); Burning Sun investor Madam Lin (6); Cheonwon Industries CEO Choi Tae-young (6); Club Arena owner Kang (8); Club Arena owner Lin (8); Clubgoer and first reporter Kim Sang-kyo (14); Burning Sun MD Cho (9, 10); Additional Burning Sun participants (1, 2, 6, 7, 9, 10); Other entertainment venue participants (7, 9, 10, 14)
- Charges: 1 mediating or purchasing prostitution; 2 habitual or overseas gambling; 3 illegal currency transactions; 4 business operations violations; 5 instigating violence; 6 embezzlement; 7 taking or sharing illegal images; 8 tax evasion; 9 habitual drug use; 10 drug smuggling and distribution; 11 bribing police officials; 12 accepting bribes (police officials); 13 misuse of power (police officials); 14 sexual assault or rape

The Burning Sun scandal, also known as Burning Sun gate, was a 2019 entertainment and sex scandal in Seoul, South Korea, which involved several celebrities, including Korean idols of popular K-pop groups, and police officials. It began on January 27, 2019, when MBC Newsdesk reported a November 2018 alleged assault of a male clubgoer at the Burning Sun, a prominent nightclub in Gangnam, by a staff member. The Seoul Metropolitan Police Agency investigation soon turned to one concerning the club's alleged involvement in sexual assault or date rape, prostitution, drug trafficking and police corruption.

The chatroom exposé immediately affected multiple celebrities, leading to their criminal prosecution and resignation from the entertainment industry. One of the club's directors was Seungri from the boy band BigBang, and after being charged with sexual bribery, he announced his retirement from the industry on March 11, 2019. Allegations of rape and spy cams quickly followed when singer and entertainer Jung Joon-young confessed to secretly filming himself having sex with women and sharing the videos, without their knowledge or consent, in the Jung Joon-young KakaoTalk chatrooms. This resulted in his resignation from the entertainment industry on March 12, 2019. Subsequently, SBS funE reported the discovery of illicit videos dating from 2015 to 2016, as well as conversations Jung shared in chat groups on the social media app KakaoTalk with Seungri and other acquaintances. On March 14, Yong Jun-hyung of Highlight and Choi Jong-hoon of F.T. Island resigned from their positions, after allegations they were participants in the chatrooms. The agency for Lee Jong-hyun of CNBLUE admitted his involvement on March 15.

Legal proceedings for criminal investigations generated by the scandal continued into 2021. Although several police officers were disciplined for their actions involving the Burning Sun club, the two highest-profile cases resulted in trial acquittals. Burning Sun's co-CEO, Lee Sung-hyun, testified that he had paid a former police officer named Kang to cover for an underage clubgoer incident. However, Kang's one-year prison sentence was overturned for lack of evidence. A senior police official, Yoon Gyu-geun, was arrested for allegations of bribery and mediating favors for the Burning Sun club and others. His first trial was well-publicized and ended with an innocent verdict. Among other verdicts, the club's co-CEO, Lee Moon-ho, was sentenced to a year in prison for habitual drug use, including ecstasy and ketamine in Gangnam clubs. One of the club's promoters, MD Cho, was sentenced to four years and six months for drug use and smuggling. Police conducted drug sweeps at entertainment venues that yielded hundreds of drug-related arrests, a large percentage involving ecstasy and GHB, a common date rape drug; along with cases of sexual assault and rape, and the filming of illegal videos during drug use. Seungri's business associate, Yoo In-seok, admitted to providing potential Japanese investors with prostitutes and received a suspended sentence of three years probation and an embezzlement charge. Seungri's entertainment agency head, Yang Hyun-suk, admitted to gambling and illegal money transactions in Las Vegas casinos and was sentenced to paying a fine, along with three YG and YGX associates. Seungri's case concluded in January 2022 in a military appeals court, with a reduced prison sentence of one year and a half and a fine. The nine charges included habitual gambling overseas and illegal money transactions, prostitution mediation and purchase, violence instigation, violation of the Specific Economic Crimes Act, embezzlement, sharing illicit photos, and a business operations violation.

The club's scandal was heightened in the media, exacerbated by Seungri's wide popularity and his possible business connections to it. The allegations of sex crimes added to the country's "epidemic" of what is called molka, a Korean word for the online distribution of nonconsensual sex videos taken of women. The scandal became a hotly contested topic among various political parties, who argued over how to handle it.

== Background ==
=== Seungri's background as a businessman ===
The multilingual Seungri – who has multiple business interests – was popularly seen as an "ideal cultural export".

— Lee Moon-won, popular culture critic, in the South China Morning Post.

Lee Seung-hyun, better known under his stage name Seungri (Korean: 승리; lit. '"victory"') was the youngest member of the South Korean boy band BigBang at age 28 at the time of the scandal, having debuted at age 15. Seungri had developed a second career in business, and had experience in several business ventures including a Japanese ramen restaurant chain, cosmetics, a Belgian waffle cafe, and a record company co-founded with his agency YG Entertainment. He invested in biotechnology and nanotechnology and the development of masks for yellow dust protection, and failed at real estate and electronic businesses. He closed his successful vocal and dance academy, the Joy Dance – Plug In Music Academy, which he first opened in 2011, in his home town of Gwangju, with branches around South Korea, after some parents complained about an "overly friendly" teacher-student relationship at one location. In November 2018, he entered the IT sector when he became the Creative Director and model for HeadRock VR, a franchise brand of the AR product company SocialNetwork and affiliate Mediafront; and assisted in the opening of the Headrock VR theme park in Singapore.

Jessica Oak at Billboard wrote, "Seungri has forged and built an empire all his own during his 13 years in the industry. The superstar has become known as a thriving entrepreneur with business ventures in food, nightlife and music labels". He had been the subject of a popular TV show on SBS, about his life and businesses, filmed "speaking four languages and throwing lavish parties in luxury resorts." In August 2018, Baik Su-jin, a journalist at The Chosun Ilbo, described his story, among other rich celebrities, as a "rags-to-riches" story, adding that Seungri was a late bloomer in the spotlight, only coming into his own after the other BigBang members were absent. Seungri said, "I had a tough time outshining other members of the group, so I studied foreign languages." He said he had tried to succeed at business, in part, because he felt "overlooked and underappreciated" by fans, being the youngest of the famous group, and business was a place where he would not have to compete with the other band members. Seungri said his popularity had been a business asset and he had looked for partners that would benefit from it."

His last studio album The Great Seungri was a play on his nickname, from the novel The Great Gatsby. After his involvement in the scandal, a popular culture critic in Seoul, Lee Moon-won, said "the multilingual Seungri", with "has multiple business interests" had been seen as an "ideal cultural export", deemed to be a hard-worker by his fans. Lee pointed out the irony of Seungri's having been found to be thoroughly comparable to The Great Gatsby protagonist, not only for his good looks, business acumen, and lavish parties, but because both had sought "illicit and corrupt activities to gain fame and wealth." Just before the scandal broke, Seungri had released his first solo Korean language studio album in July 2018, and was conducting his first solo tour, The Great Seungri, after 13 years as a group member. He was filling the void for the band's hiatus while all remaining four members were in military service, and waiting for his own enlistment in March.

=== Opening of the Burning Sun ===
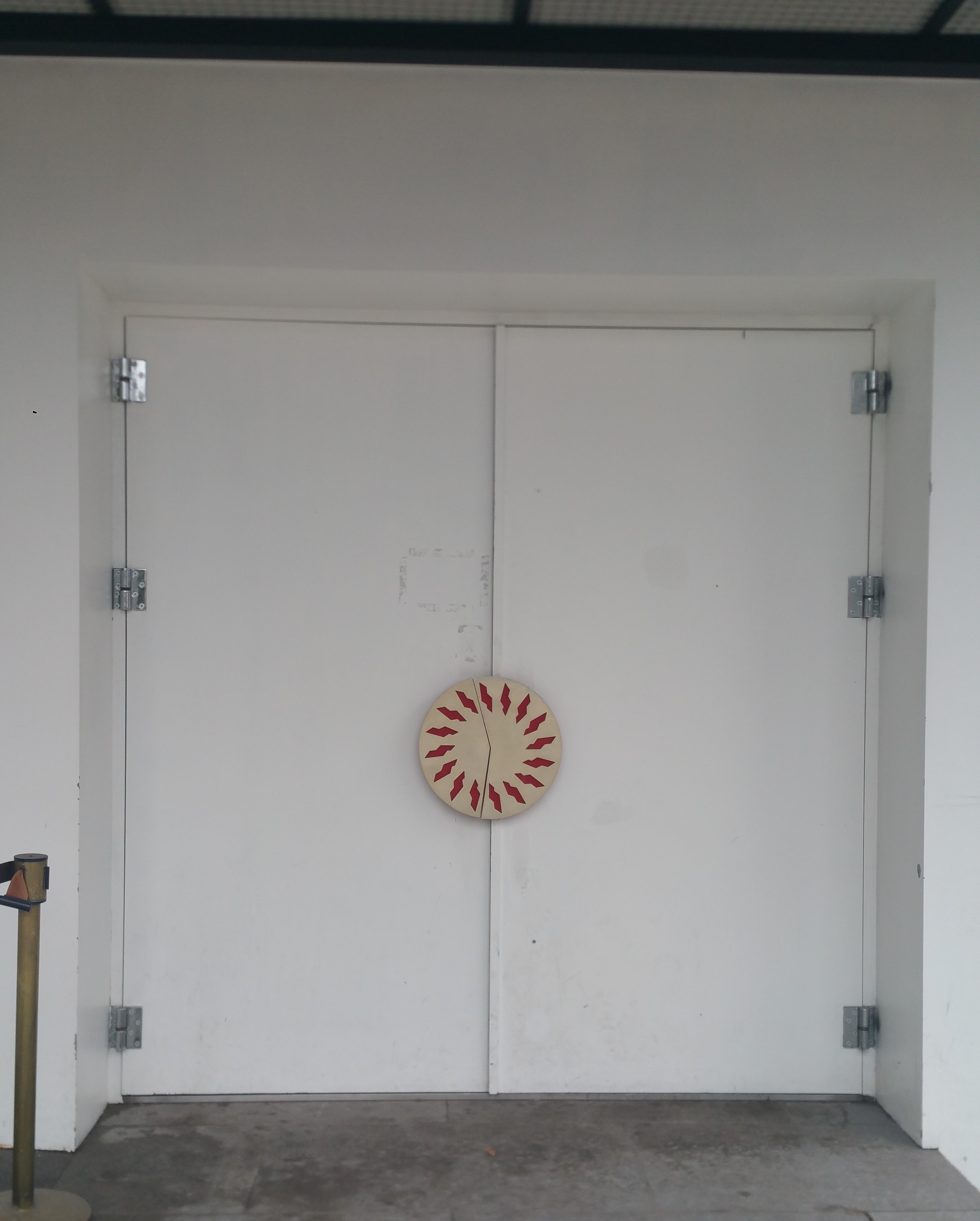
Closed entrance of Club Burning Sun, Le Méridien Hotel, Gangnam. March 27, 2019.

The Burning Sun nightclub, (클럽 버닝썬, Club Burning Sun), opened at the Le Méridien Seoul hotel in Yeoksam-dong, Gangnam-gu, on February 23, 2018, and closed during the investigation of the scandal on February 17, 2019. The upscale hotel had just replaced the Ritz Carlton Hotel and opened in September 2017, months before the Burning Sun's opening. The nightclub was often called "Seungri's Club", due to its close affiliation with him.

The Burning Sun advertised itself as "the most elegant and finest club in South Korea". It included a basement level for EDM, a second level for hip hop, VIP admittance, 60 VIP tables near the DJ box and stage, spacious dance floors and accommodation for 1000 guests. The drink menu listed Armand de Brignac champagne and Louis XIII cognac sets, priced in the thousands of dollars. The sound system was set up by Funktion-One, a specialized overseas company, whose sound expert, Tony Andrews, was invited to the club for sound tuning. Seungri served as one of the DJs, along with other local and visiting guest artists like R3hab.

The club's CEOs were Lee Moon-ho and Lee Sung-hyun, a former board member of the company that operated the Le Méridien Seoul hotel. Seungri was one of seven in-house directors, and resigned from his position in January 2019. Seungri was the co-founder of Yuri Holdings, a shareholder of Burning Sun Entertainment that operated the club and owned as much as 20 percent in shares. It was established in March 2016, with Yoo In-seok, to manage his restaurant and entertainment businesses. Seungri resigned from his position in mid February and Yoo resigned on March 13. Seungri described his relationship to the club in an interview with The Chosun Ilbo, published on March 22, 2019, saying that CEO Lee Moon-ho, a friend of his, was the operator of the club and in charge, while Seungri's name was used for marketing, after his initial investment of 10 million won (around US$8,800). In the interview, Seungri said the breakdown of Burning Sun's shares were as follows: owners of Le Méridien Seoul, 42 percent; Lee Sung-hyun (CEO of Le Méridien Seoul), 8 percent; Yuri Holdings, 20 percent, Madam Lin (Taiwanese investor), 20 percent; and Lee Moon-ho, 10 percent.

=== Seungri's affiliations with other clubs ===
Monkey Museum was a Gangnam club to associate Seungri's name, and opened on July 27, 2016, in the upscale neighborhood of Cheongdam-dong, Gangnam-gu. It was a trendy hip hop lounge-style bar, co-owned by Seungri, Yoo and a group of K-pop singers. During the scandal's investigation, it became one of the first non-relevant charges against Seungri, of illegal operation as a bar, while it was registered as a restaurant; and later involved allegations of embezzlement of funds by Seungri and Yoo.

Arena (or Club Arena) was a dance club that opened in 2014 in Nonhyeon-dong, Gangnam-gu. It was known as a TV and sports celebrity hang-out, had a reputation for a very strict dress code, and could accommodate 700 guests with separate EDM and hip hop dance floors. It was another club Seungri was affiliated with, and where he was alleged to have made arrangements for investors to receive sexual favors. The owner, last name Kang, and another of the club's operators, were arrested on tax evasion charges during the scandal's investigation.

=== Seungri's friends and scandal participants ===
Seungri was close to celebrity friends Jung Joon-young and Choi Jong-hoon, who joined him when his agency YG Entertainment launched their newest YG Republique restaurant in August 2017, in Kuala Lumpur. Jung, a singer-songwriter and television celebrity, and the key person in the illicit sex video portion of the scandal, had been a friend of Seungri for several years. In 2015, he showed off their relationship by telephoning Seungri for a chat during a live radio broadcast. In August 2018, Seungri joined him on the travel show Salty Tour, where Jung was a main cast member, and made comments that generated disciplinary actions by the Korea Communications Standards Commission due to their gender insensitivity or potential "sexual harassment". During a broadcast episode on a trip to Xiamen, China, Seungri asked a female guest (singer and actress Sejeong) to pick a favorite amongst the five male cast members and pour them a drink; which viewers complained about.

== Development ==
=== 2019: Scandal begins and cases develop ===
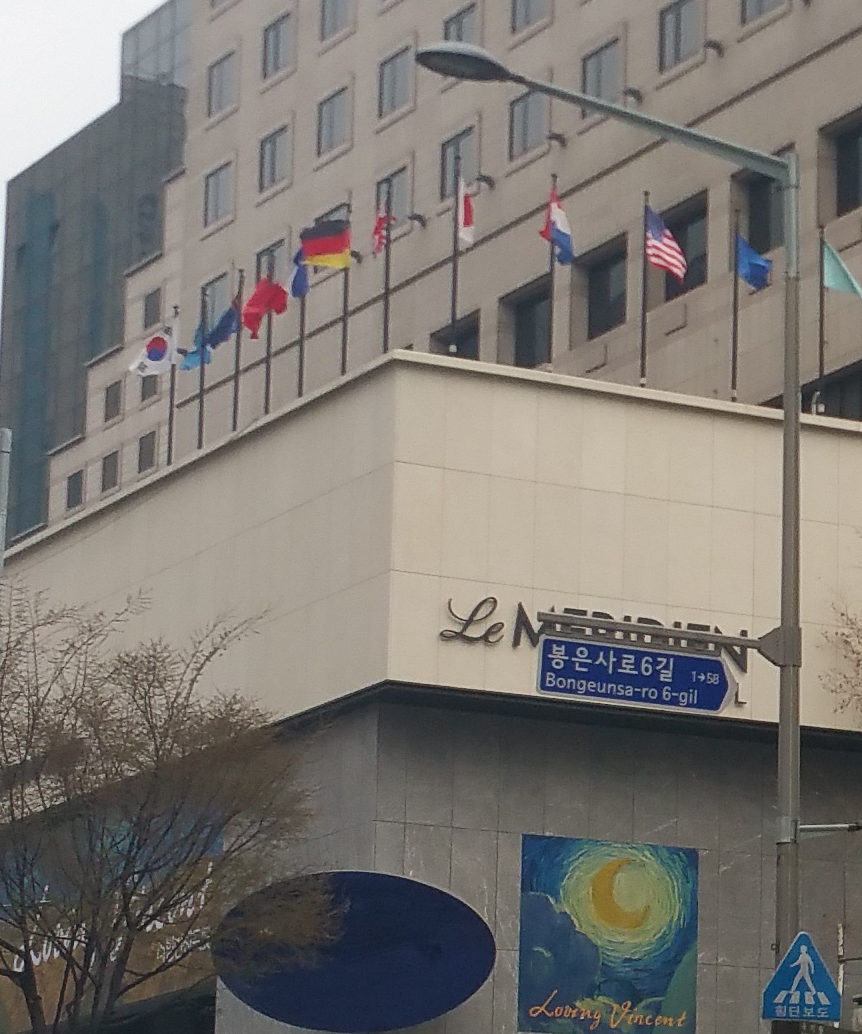
Le Meridien Hotel, Gangnam, location of Club Burning Sun.

==== January 28, Kim Sang-Kyo assault at Burning Sun reported ====
On January 28, 2019, MBC Newsdesk reported on an alleged assault of a 29-year-old clubgoer, Kim Sang-kyo, at the Burning Sun nightclub. Kim claimed that on November 24, 2018, during his stay at the Burning Sun, he was assaulted by staff while attempting to help a woman who was being sexually harassed. When the Yeoksam police arrived, Kim was arrested as the assailant and was booked on seven charges, including criminal battery, an indecent act, defamation and the obstruction of the performance of official duties. He further claimed that the police assaulted him after he was placed under arrest. The incident came to media attention one month after the incident, when Kim made a post on the South Korean online forum BobaeDream titled '경찰의 민간인 집단폭행 및 버닝썬 집단 구타사건' (transl. police mass assault on a civilian and the Burning Sun mass beating incident) and posted photos of his injuries along with the names and ranks of the police who allegedly assaulted him. In January 2019, Kim posted a petition on the Petitions to Blue House website detailing his assault by Burning Sun staffers and mistreatment by police; and further stating that female customers were drugged by staffers and the club had a corrupt relationship with district police. Another current petition on the website called for the investigation of the club scene, in general, and druggings occurring there. The Petitions to Blue House website, known domestically as Cheong Wa Dae gungmincheongwon (Korean: 청와대 국민청원; lit. 'citizen petition to the Blue House') was a petition website based on former President Obama's We the People. Kim's petition had received the benchmark 200,000 signatures prompting an official response.

==== Initial allegations at Burning Sun ====
During the early stages, the scandal evolved around Kim's complaint against the Burning Sun nightclub, including any possible crimes that may have occurred there, and the identities of responsible parties. The initial January 28 report of the Kim incident, by MBC Newsdesk, included two CCTV videos of the club's security footage purportedly showing Kim's assault inside the club, and a second one showing a woman being dragged down a hallway, and alleged to have been drugged. A KBS report soon added that an alleged former employee had talked about illegal drug use in the club's VIP rooms. An additional report by MBC, on February 14, included allegations of a purported VIP client of the club, who said staff solicited him in text messages, offering women who were available for sex, after readying them with date rape drugs. He claimed to have received a video clip from staff, showing "an intoxicated woman being raped".

By January 31, 2019, the Seoul Metropolitan Police Agency (SMPA) had taken charge of the investigation, which included allegations of local Gangnam police corruption and collusion with the club's owners, and had assigned a team to look into the club's allegations of sexual violence, drug use, Kim's arrest and any connection with the local police station. The SMPA said their quick response and follow-up investigation was due to media attention garnered by the BigBang K-pop group member Seungri's affiliation with the club. They also said they had expanded their probe of drug-related allegations to all Gangnam clubs, due to club marketing by independent "merchandisers" or "MDs" for many different clubs.

Seungri's involvement and his relationship to the nightclub immediately became a hot media issue. Yang Hyun-suk the chief of his agency, YG Entertainment, released a statement on January 31, that Seungri had been at the club on November 28, but left before Kim's incident occurred. He also said Seungri's recent resignation as a senior director of the club was due to his upcoming military enlistment. Seungri's delayed response to the controversy was in an Instagram statement on February 2, stating that he was not present at the club during Kim's alleged assault, had belatedly heard about it, and served as an executive director for the club and had no part in the club's operation or management; but he, however, apologized that he had not taken responsibility from the beginning.

==== February 26, first KakaoTalk messages revealed ====
On February 26, 2019, SBS FunE released the first portions of the KakaoTalk recordings that would become crucial in the investigation, saying their origin was an anonymous source which had turned them over to the Anti-Corruption and Civil Rights Commission on February 22. The recordings dated back to 2015, and seemed to implicate Seungri with allegations that he had directed Burning Sun staff to arrange prostitutes for foreign investors who were coming to Seoul, at another Gangnam nightclub. The source had cited possible police collusion as the reason for not turning them over directly to police. The police held a press conference on March 4, saying they had not seen the original, unedited KakaoTalk messages and doubted their veracity, just prior to an SBS report detailing how they had obtained them.

On February 27, Seungri was questioned by the SMPA, a lengthy interview that lasted overnight and included a drug test. Seungri denied allegations of attempts to buy sex for potential foreign investors (or sex for business favors) and any knowledge of the KakaoTalk messages, which had been disclosed by media, conversations he allegedly had with a Burning Sun co-founder and another of its employees about such arrangements; and he denied drug use. Media reports said that various nightclubs were used for the lobbying, including one named Arena, where Seungri allegedly arranged sexual favors for investors. In one alleged chat conversation between Seungri and his business partners in December 2015, Seungri says, "Give B (the anonymous investor) everything she wants. Get a hold of the main [rooms] 3 and 4 at the [club] Arena. We have guests from Taiwan". After confirming arrangements with a man surnamed Kim, Seungri asked, "And what about the girls? [Give them] the easy girls." Yoo answered, "I'm getting the prostitutes ready, so if you get two prostitutes, then lead them to the hotel rooms. Two is good?"

On International Women's Day, March 8, the scandal led to a street protest in Gangnam against the Burning Sun and other nightclubs, calling for an end to what the protesters called a culture that treats women as sexual objects. Although thousands of women had rallied in 2018 against illicit filming and sharing, the allegations against the idealized image of pop idols still surprised the public. The serious nature of the scandal prompted a response from President Moon Jae-in, who ordered a thorough investigation.

==== Seungri booked ====
On March 10, Seungri was booked on sex bribery charges. The following day, he resigned from entertainment on his Instagram account, stating that he had caused a "societal disturbance" and said he would cooperate with the investigation.

==== March 11, Jung Joon-young KakaoTalk chatrooms and source revealed ====
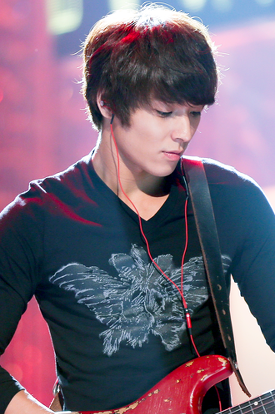
Choi Jong-hoon, 2012

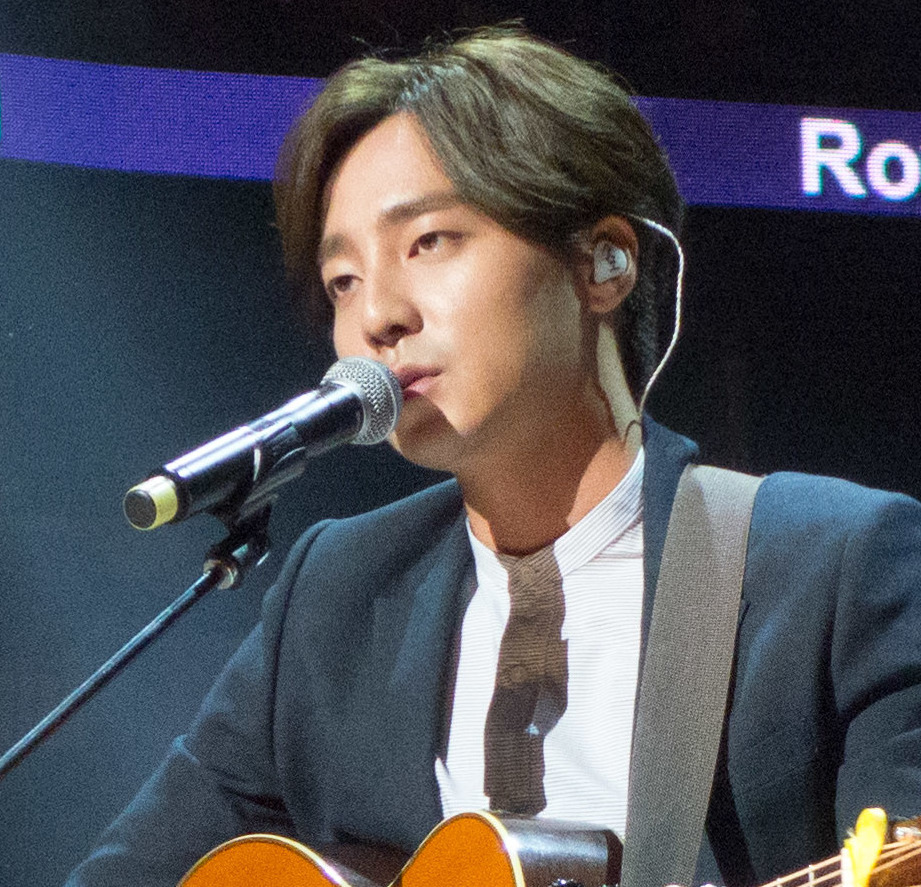
Roy Kim, 2015

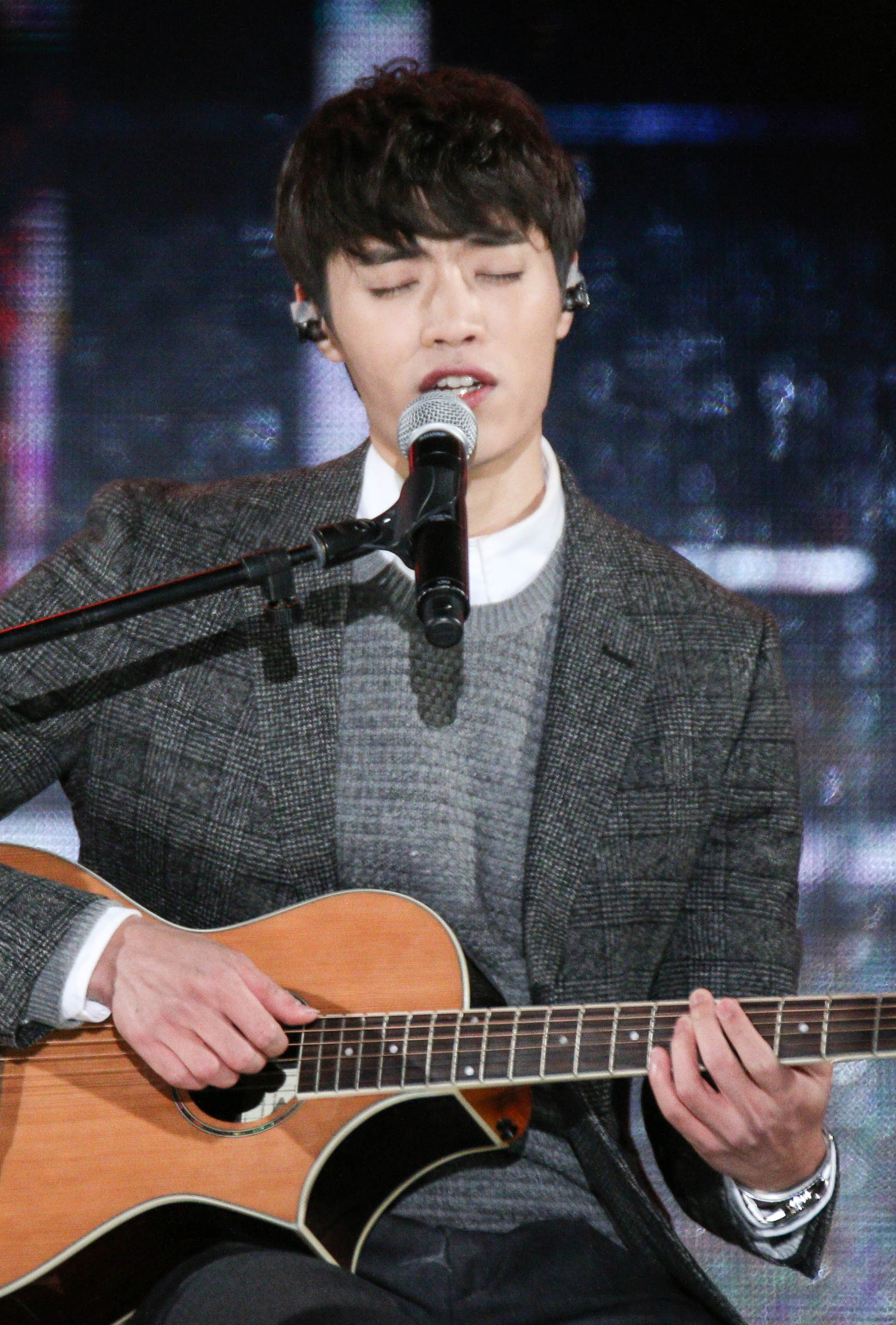
Eddy Kim, 2014

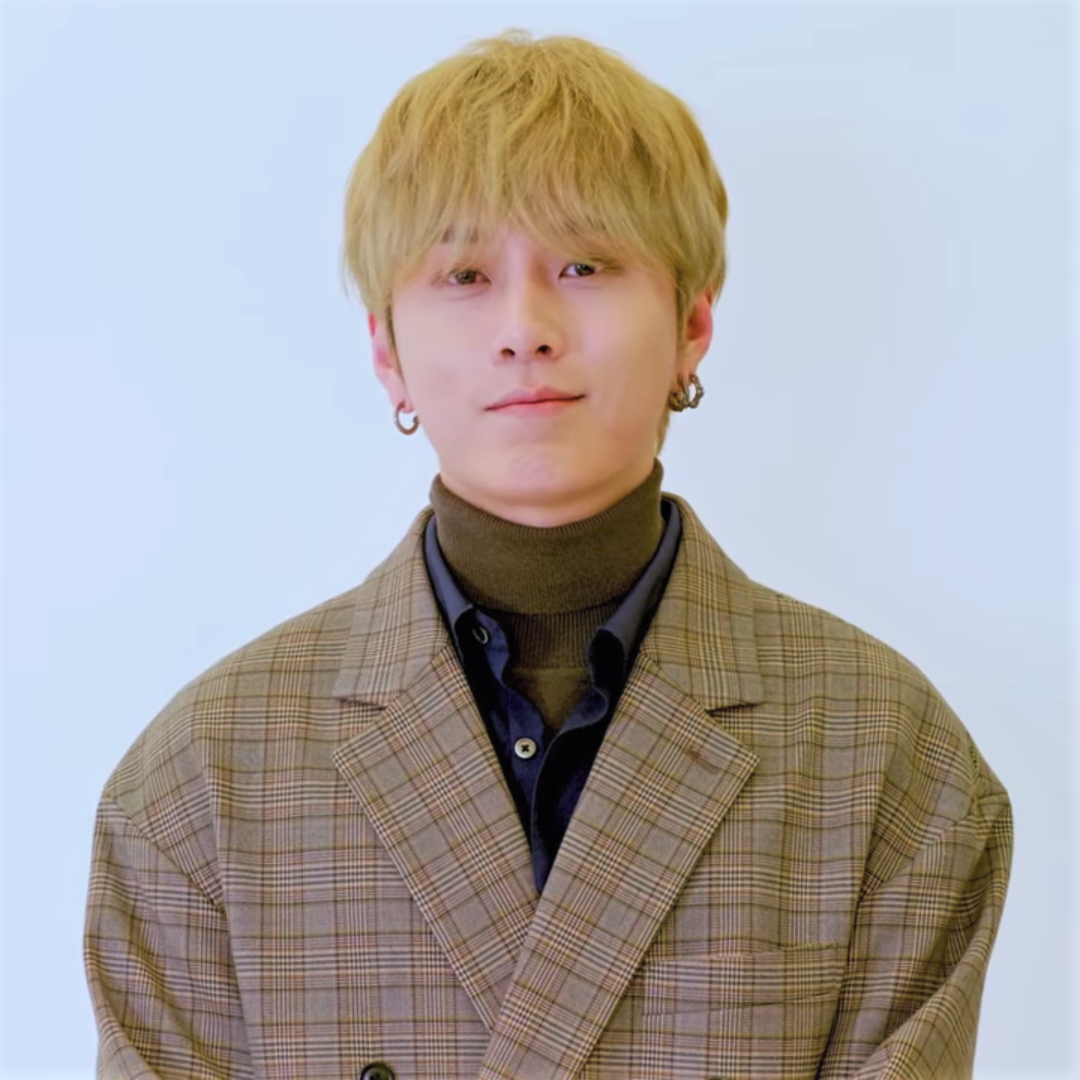
Yong Jun-hyung, 2017

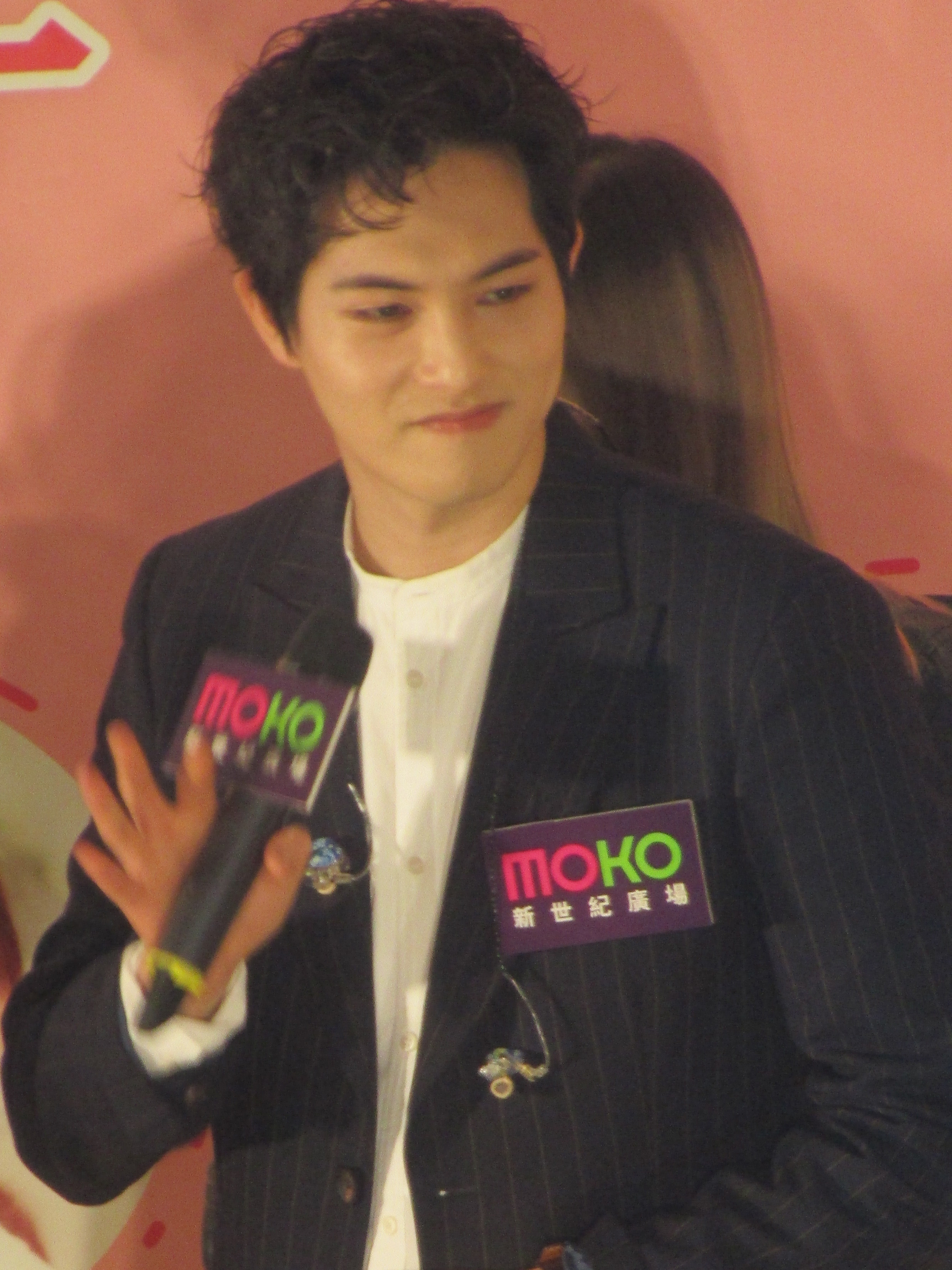
Lee Jong-hyun, 2017

Other idols involved in the Jung Joon-young KakaoTalk chatrooms

The source of the KakaoTalk messages was revealed to be a lawyer, Bang Jung-hyun, on March 11, when he was interviewed on SBS Eight O'Clock News. He had obtained the messages from a whistleblower or "anonymous source", possibly a technician at a phone repair shop, where singer and entertainer Jung Joon-young had dropped his phone off for repairs. The whistleblower had sent an email to Bang, of thousands of chats taken from Jung's phone, which took place over eight months between 2015 and 2016. When the Burning Sun scandal started, the phone messages were forwarded to the Anti-Corruption and Civil Rights Commission and to SBS FunE; and the secretly filmed sex tapes and other chat messages on Jung's phone became public. During the SBS interview, the integrity of the chat room file was discussed, and was said to have a tamper-proof device, technically a hash-code verification, showing that the file had not been manipulated; and could stand as circumstantial evidence to seek more evidence. Bang, an economics graduate of Seoul National University, and a practicing lawyer, said of the chats, "Their conversations showed that there were not only sex crimes by celebrities, but also a cozy relationship between them and top police officers," and "It is someone higher up than [the Gangnam Police Precinct chief]."

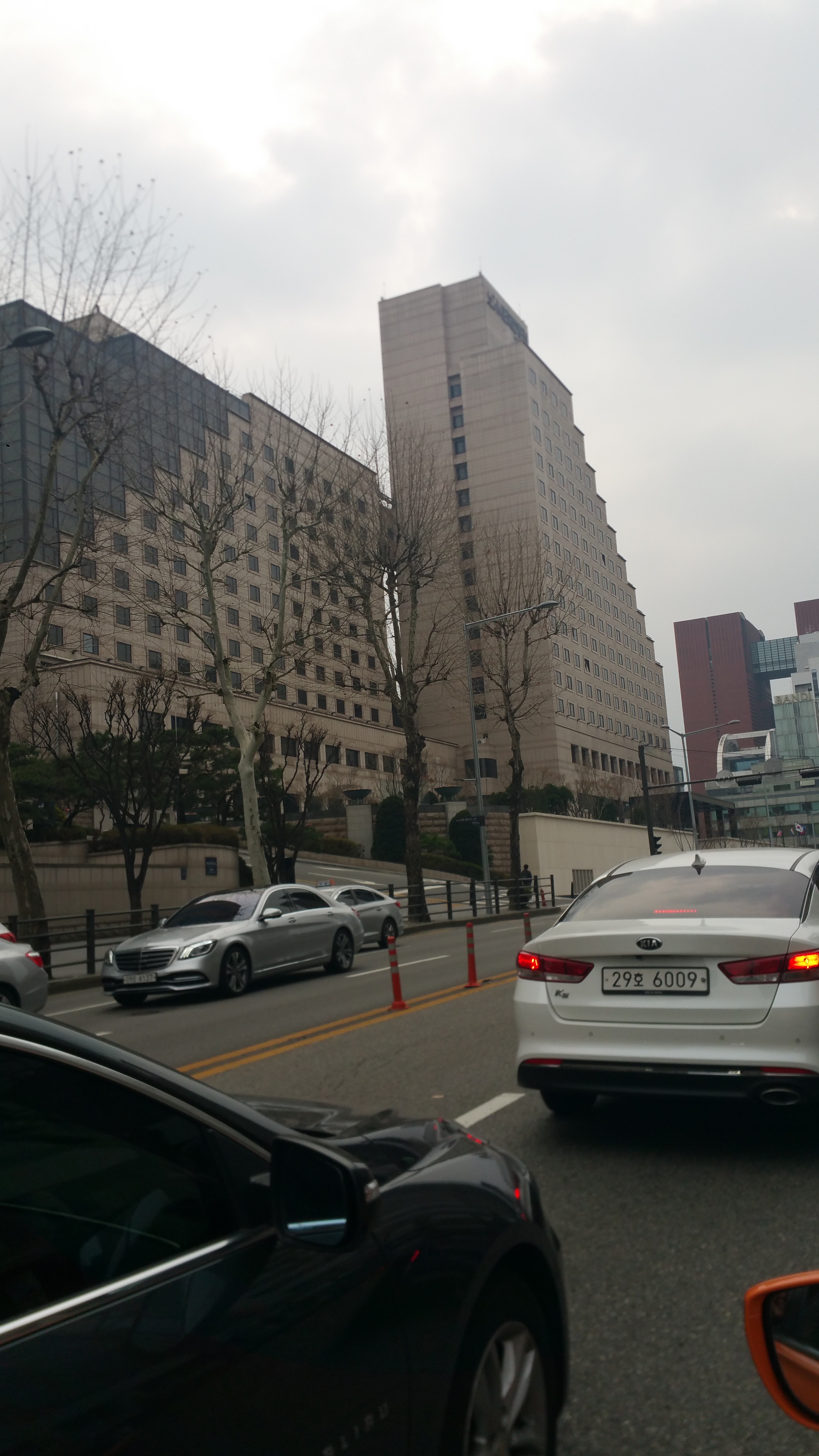
Traffic on Bongeunsa-ro, Yeoksam-dong, Gangnam. Le Meridien Hotel, location of Club Burning Sun on left.

Also, on Monday, March 11, due to possible police involvement, the commission, a watchdog agency, turned the records over to the Supreme Prosecutors' Office of the Republic of Korea, asking them to investigate the scandal instead of the police. Within a week, the case was transferred to the Seoul Central District Prosecutors' Office who said they would assign a team to direct the SMPA's investigation. Also, due to the new allegations of possible police misconduct, on March 14, Commissioner Min Gap-ryong of the Korean National Police Agency (KNPA) reported to the Ministry of Public Safety and Security at the National Assembly, that "A total of 126 agents will be assigned to investigate the nightclub Burning Sun, the assault at Club Arena, drug use, ties with the police, and allegations of brokering prostitution, filming and distributing illegal videos, among other things". President Moon ordered an investigation of the scandal on March 18, to include two past sex scandal cases; the first one involved a former vice justice minister, Kim Hak-ui, who was cleared of a scandal in 2013, but had new allegations of raping women and appearing in sex videos with them, and the second one was the 2009 suicide of rookie actress Jang Ja-yeon, whose purported suicide note included a list of men who she was forced to have sex with, by her entertainment agency. The handling of those cases had been criticized for nonimpartiality due to the involvement of high-profile figures. He said, "The current leadership of the prosecution and police should stake the fate of their organizations with responsibility on uncovering the truth and becoming a law enforcement agency that can reveal its own shameful acts so as to regain trust," and "I am stressing that if we cannot fix it, we cannot call this society a just one."

Ha Hyun-ock, a deputy financial news editor of the JoongAng Ilbo likened the burgeoning events to the Korean Mafia, with allegations of "drug dealing, prostitution, violence, tax evasion and collusion with police". He referred to the assessment Bang brought up on the SBS news program, of its being the beginning of a Korean Mafia, with K-pop's popularity creating celebrities of new money and status, who hobnob with business and government connections.

Seungri's and Jung's inter-locking scandals were combined in public televised view when both were called into the SMPA station on March 14, with more than 100 journalists gathered for Jung's 10 a.m. appearance. It consisted of his arrival, and apology, before entering the station for questioning and a drug test; followed similarly by Seungri, some three hours later. Police also questioned Seungri's business partner and Yuri Holdings CEO Yoo In-seok. Seungri exited first, at around 6:15 a.m. on March 15, some 16 hours later, and he told reporters, as he exited, that he would be putting in a request to delay his mandatory military service later in the month. Jung exited, about an hour later, after his 21-hour interrogation.

==== April 1 – end of year, Seungri's business partner admits to hiring prostitutes, and first arrest warrant fails ====
On April 1, SMPA announced they had booked Seungri and Yoo for allegations of embezzlement from the Monkey Museum club, which they opened in 2016. Later allegations stated that funds from Yuri Holdings were used to pay attorney fees for a criminal case involving an employee of the club. On April 29, a Chosun Ilbo headline, "Seung-ri's Business Partner Admits Pimping", followed Seungri and Yoo's new questioning by SMPA, in which Seungri continued to deny any involvement with prostitution, and Yoo finally admitted that he supplied prostitutes to six or more Japanese investors at their Gangnam nightclub in December 2015. SMPA had paper trails of money transactions, a YG Entertainment credit card payment by Seungri and a wire transfer by Yoo, and chat room conversations the two had with Jung about the arrangements; and had booked 17 prostitutes and pimps related to the incidents. Seungri was summoned for questioning about alleged embezzlement of the Burning Sun club's funds for the first time, on May 2, following sixteen prior interrogations about his alleged arrangement of sexual services for investors.

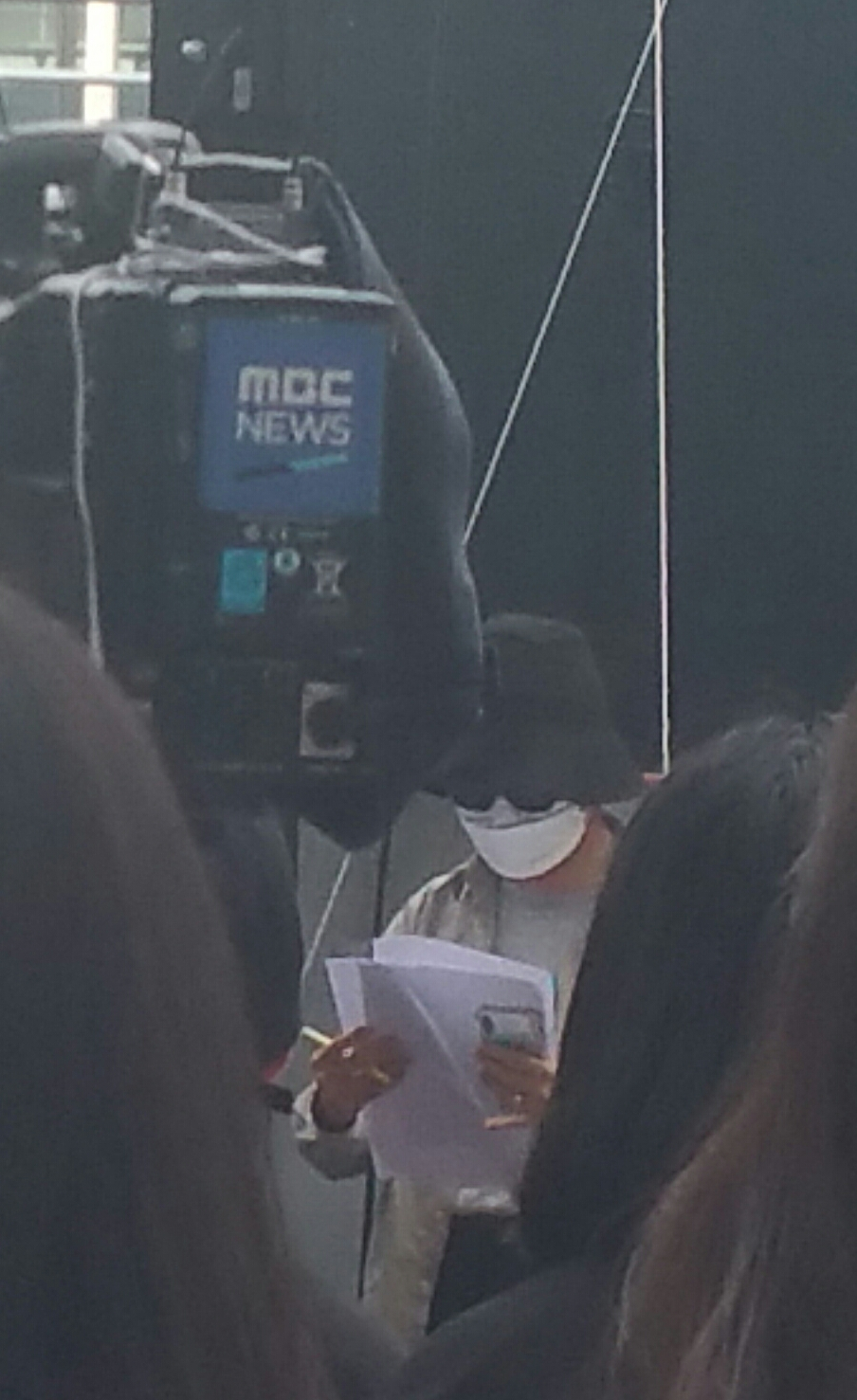
MBC TV covering a Burning Sun protest rally, Le Méridien Hotel subway exit, Gangnam, May 25, 2019.

On May 7, SMPA requested arrest warrants, to include pre-trial detention, for Seungri and Yoo, and they appeared at May 14 hearings, on charges of embezzling company funds and arranging sexual services for foreign investors, along with a new charge that Seungri had paid for sexual services himself. Seungri admitted that he received illicit sex services but denied all other allegations at the Seoul Central District Court hearing, and was led to a holding cell in ropes to await the decision, which came later in the evening, when both arrest warrants were denied, with the court citing "room for dispute" over the alleged embezzlement, and said the possibility of destroying evidence was slim. SMPA referred Seungri's case to prosecutors on June 25, with charges related to 1.1 billion won (US$951,000) in embezzlement, destruction of evidence, violation of laws on sex trade, sexual crimes and food hygiene. Allegations included procuring prostitutes for himself and for others from Taiwan, Hong Kong, and Japan from December 2015 to January 2016. His business partner Yoo was also referred to prosecutors for procuring prostitutes.

MBC TV's May 27 show Straight introduced new allegations and another celebrity name to the scandal. It alleged that YG Entertainment's founder Yang Hyun-suk had arranged sexual services for foreign investors in July 2014, which he and the company denied. SMPA began an investigation based on the show's details of an alleged dinner meeting in Gangnam and a trip to a nightclub NB, affiliated with Yang, that included Yang, a Malaysian fugitive Jho Low, a Thai national named Bob (Chavanos Rattakul), a YG singer, a Madam Jung, Hwang Ha-na; and as many as 10 prostitutes, who allegedly provided sexual services at the nightclub. Singer Psy, who was with YG Entertainment at the time, released a statement that he had introduced his friend Jho Low to Yang, and acknowledged that he and Yang had been invited to the dinner and drinks with Low and the other man but denied any involvement in the alleged activities. Allegations also referenced a December 2018 rape complaint at the Burning Sun against Rattakul, one of the foreign investors also affiliated with Seungri, and who had been summoned by police. In June, Yang was questioned by police about the prostitution allegations but not taken in as a suspect and Psy was questioned as a witness about the July 2014 incident, which statute of limitations was soon to expire. On July 17, SMPA reported having booked Yang for allegations of arranging sexual services for the foreign investors in 2014, along with three more suspects for prostitution allegations; but dropped the charges against Yang on September 20, stating that they had failed to prove them.

A prior allegation of Seungri's possible gambling overseas was reignited by an August 9, JTBC report alleging instances of Yang and Seungri having gambled up to 1 to 2 billion won at the MGM Grand Las Vegas on past occasions. SMPA said they were examining Yang's financial records for possible illegal foreign exchange transactions that may have been used for his alleged gambling, which is illegal for South Koreans at home and abroad. On August 14, both Yang and Seungri were booked on charges of habitual gambling, and by August 20, charges included illegal foreign trade transactions and a travel ban had been imposed. On August 28 and 29, both were questioned and Seungri admitted to gambling, but denied allegations of illegally securing funds, in violation of the Foreign Exchange Transactions Act. Seungri was questioned again on September 24 and Yang on October 1. On October 31, SMPA said they would be referring Yang and Seungri, along with three others, for prosecution of alleged habitual gambling, for a time period from the second half of 2014 to the present.

In the first case with allegations of police collusion, a former Gangnam police officer surnamed Kang, was sentenced to one year in prison on August 14. During the trial co-CEO Lee Sung-hyun testified that he paid 20 million won (US$17,000) to Kang to cover for an underage clubgoer incident at the Burning Sun and had not discussed the arrangements with Seungri. In drug related cases, on August 22, co-CEO Lee Moon-ho received a suspended sentence of three years probation and community service for a year and a half prison term in a habitual drug use case where he pled guilty, but at a second trial on November 28, was sentenced to one year in prison with charges of using more than 10 drugs, including ecstasy and ketamine in Gangnam clubs from 2018 through February 2019. The court said that Lee Moon-ho's position as the operator of the Burning Sun Club put him at a different level than an "ordinary drug offender" and his first sentencing had been "light and unfair". A senior SMPA official, Yoon Gyu-geun, referred to as the "police chief" in the chatrooms, was arrested on October 10, on charges of accepting bribes and misuse of power, among others, following a search at his office in September. Yoon was referred for prosecution in June for allegedly informing Seungri and Yoo In-seok of police crackdowns, but the late search and focus on Yoon was questioned by a The Korea Times report by Lee Suh-yoon as possibly being related to his having worked in the Blue House in 2017 under Justice Minister Cho Kuk, who was being investigated in a separate case. A businessman named Jeong, a possible link between Yoon and Yoo was arrested earlier on embezzlement charges. Yoon was indicted on October 29, on charges of bribery, obstruction of business, and concealing evidence, among others, related to allegations of attempting to cover up illegalities at the Burning Sun and other businesses run by Seungri and Yoo. Yoon was also alleged to have received unlisted stocks from businessman Jeong in relation to the case; while Jeong is suspected of being tied to illicit financial transactions in the separate case against ex-Justice Minister Cho. A Burning Sun employee, an MD named Cho, one of the first investigated in the club's scandal, was sentenced to four years and six months imprisonment in early December for smuggling and administering drugs.

==== Other investigations ====
SMPA announced on May 15 they had referred the original whistleblower of the club's scandal, Kim Sang-kyo, to the prosecution for indictment for sexually assaulting three women and obstructing the business.

In early July, the government responded to an April 11 Cheong Wa Dae petition which had detailed new allegations at the Burning Sun club, which was followed by a report on MBC TV's Straight. Witnesses interviewed on the program alleged "underage sex trafficking and violent sexual abuse of women", claiming VIP rooms at the club and offsite were set up for customers, including those from upperclass Korean families, and a special clean-up crew called the "incinerators" were employed to remove blood and incriminating evidence. The petition which received the required signatures, asked for the investigation of an alleged group rape by six men in one of the VIP rooms, of a woman who had been given GHB, called "mulpong" in South Korea. In late June, BBC News reporter Laura Bicker shared similar allegations of Gangnam's nightlife, "in its glitzy nightclubs, women have been drugged to order by powerful men and raped" and "underage girls are being sexually exploited for profit". On July 9, KNPA Commissioner Min responded that the allegations of sexual abuse and drug use in the VIP rooms, per the petition, were not confirmed. He added, "I will humbly accept the public's criticism that the results of the investigation are insufficient in relation to the Burning Sun case".

On July 17, SMPA held a preventive meeting at the Seodaemun District police offices to discuss a "Second Burning Sun Club Opening", after a KBS report detailed possible new problems of sexual harassment at a new club in the Gangnam area, opened by former employees of the Burning Sun club, just four months after it closed down. Also, as part of an anti-corruption initiative established at the troubled Gangnam Police Station, SMPA announced an unprecedented open recruitment just for that police station in mid July, after 164 officers were transferred to other departments. A newly formed three month joint response team was also set up to investigate club illegal activity in Gangnam, from August through October, to prevent a new Burning Sun incident.

On September 10, SMPA's Cyber Security Division referred charges of defamation and pornography for twelve participants in an investigation of media personnel which began on May 3. A Cheong Wa Dae petition was filed, alleging that a chat group of about 200 reporters, producers and media staffers had shared illicit video clips of incidents that had occurred at the Burning Sun, as well as information about brothels and prostitutes.

On September 29, Lee Jae-jung, a member of the National Assembly Public Administration and Security Committee released SMPA data showing that 12 of 40 police officers involved in the initial assault allegations of Kim Sang-kyo and afterwards had been disciplined, with any actions pending for key figures, such as Yoon. Lee criticized the results as "very disappointing" and "far from the public's expectation".

=== 2020: Indictments and trials continue ===
==== Seungri second arrest warrant fails, prosecution indicts without arrest ====
On January 8, 2020, seven months after police had submitted their case, the prosecution filed a second warrant requesting Seungri's arrest on seven charges – procuring prostitution for himself and others (29 times for foreign investors between September 2015 and January 2016), embezzlement (about $17,000 from Yuri Holdings), habitual gambling in Las Vegas (for a period of three years and six months since 2013), illegal currency transactions, violation of the Food Sanitation Law (at Monkey Museum club), and sharing three unconsented nude photos of women via mobile messenger. No other warrants for his business partner Yoo, or any others involved, were requested. The court denied the request at a hearing on January 13, saying detention was not warranted based on Seungri's "role and involvement in wrongdoings" and "his attitude toward the prosecution's investigation".

On January 30, prosecutors indicted nine people, without detention, for allegations of crimes related to the Burning Sun case, including: Seungri for mediating prostitution, gambling, and violation of the Foreign Exchange Transaction Act, Yoo In-seok for mediating prostitution and business embezzlement, and Yang Hyun-suk for gambling and violation of the Foreign Exchange Transaction Act. Another two, Jung Joon-young and Choi Jong-hoon, who were already imprisoned after a rape trial in 2019, were indicted for allegations of soliciting prostitution and for bribery of a police officer in a drunk driving incident, respectively.

On February 7, former police officer Kang's trial conviction and sentencing in August 2019 for police collusion in the admittance of an underage customer at the Burning Sun club was overturned by an appeals court, based on lack of evidence showing that Kang had received the money.

On April 3, four of the nine people charged with prostitution allegations received a summary judgment, with Jung Joon-young fined one million won and the Burning Sun's prior MD Kim fined two million won. On April 25, the so-called "police chief" Yoon Gyu-geun, previously arrested in the fall of 2019 for allegations of bribery and mediating favors for the Burning Sun club, among others, was acquitted of all charges by a Seoul Central District trial court due to the prosecution's lack of evidence, although the court said, "It is not that the accused is 100 percent innocent or that the charges are not true."

At a June 3 court hearing, Yoo admitted to all charges, including those related to prostitution and embezzlement. At trial on June 22, Yoo again admitted to most of the charges, but denied intentionality, in particular in the embezzlement charge. His charges include allegations of sex trafficking a total of twenty-four times to foreign investors from 2015 to 2016 to open the Burning Sun club. At a court hearing on September 9, Yang admitted to the gambling charges involving about 400 million won (around US$335,000) in Las Vegas casinos approximately twenty times between 2015 and 2019; with the next hearing scheduled for October 28. At a court date for Yoo on October 14, the questioning of duplicate witnesses for both the civilian trial and military trial for Seungri was discussed.

On November 27, a trial court sentenced Yang Hyun-suk to a 15 million won (US$13,600) fine for some twenty Las Vegas gambling charges between July 2015 and January 2019; along with three YG Entertainment and affiliated company YGX associates, a 37-year-old Kim and 41-year-old Lee were also fined 15 million won, and 48-year-old Keum was fined 10 million won.

Yoo received a suspended sentence of three years probation for a one-year and eight months prison term on December 24.

==== Seungri's military trial begins ====
After the conclusion of the criminal investigation and indictment in civil court, on February 4, Seungri, who had already turned 30 (Korean age) received a final notification for his mandatory military service by the Military Manpower Administration. Their statement said they were "concerned a protracted trial in civilian courts" might restrict the military obligation and the case against him would be referred to a military court for trial. Seungri joined the military on March 9, and on May 15, his trial was transferred from the Seoul Central District Court to a military court, with the civilian court trial for a remaining six defendants, including Yoo In-seok, scheduled to proceed separately. At his first hearing at the Ground Operations Command's General Military Court in Yongin on September 16, Seungri denied all the charges except for the violations of the Foreign Exchange Transaction Act. A second court date on October 14 listed some twenty-two witnesses scheduled to testify.

=== 2021–2022: Final trials ===
==== Seungri's military trial concludes and appeals filed ====
On January 14, during the ongoing military trial, prosecutors added a ninth charge against Seungri, alleging that he and Yoo involved gang members to intervene in a bar dispute in December 2015. Witness testimony concluded on July 1, with Seungri's denial of all the charges except one violation of the foreign currency act during gambling in Las Vegas; and the prosecution recommended a five-year sentencing and fine for all the charges. A military prosecutor said of Seungri, "Despite gaining advantages from the crimes, he is shifting the responsibility on another person... Considering his problematic views and attitude regarding sex, he needs to face severe punishment."

On May 20 police chief Yoon Gyu-geun was found partially guilty of instigating the destruction of evidence and punished with a fine and no prison time.

On August 12, Seungri was sentenced to a three-year prison term, a fine of 1.15 billion won (US$990,000) and immediate detention. The nine charges were: "prostitution mediation in violation of Act on the Punishment of Arrangement of Commercial Sex Acts Etc., embezzlement, overseas gambling, procuring prostitution service, violation of Foreign Exchange Transactions Act, violation of Food Sanitation Act, violation of the Act on Special Cases Concerning The Punishment, Etc. of Sexual Crimes, violation of an Act on the Aggravated Punishment Etc. of Specific Economic Crimes and mobilizing gang to threaten people." The total embezzlement amount was 528 million won (around $US455,000); the Las Vegas gambling amount, between December 2013 to August 2017, was 2.2 billion won (around US$2 million); and the period for procuring prostitutes for foreign investors from Taiwan, Japan, Hong Kong and other countries was between December 2015 to January 2016. Due to the charge of "violation of the Act on Special Cases Concerning The Punishment, Etc. of Sexual Crimes" or the distribution of three nude photos of women via a mobile chatroom, he was ordered to provide his personal information to a sex crimes registry". While denying charges, Seungri had claimed that his KakaoTalk message, widely reported by media, about women that "give well", might have been a typo that his phone's autocorrection function caused.

Appeals were filed by Seungri and the military prosecution on August 19 and 25, respectively. On January 27, 2022, a military appeals court reduced Seungri's three-year prison sentence by half, to one year and six months, and imposed a smaller fine, based on his admission of guilt and "reflection" on all nine charges. Seungri's military imprisonment, at the time, was calculated to end after another thirteen months. This sentence was upheld by the Supreme Court of Korea on May 26, 2022, whereupon Seungri was discharged from the military and transferred to a civilian prison to serve the remainder of his term.

==== First reporter Kim Sang-kyo sentenced ====
The original complainant, Kim Sang-kyo, was subsequently tried and sentenced after his 2018 indictments for sexual assault and obstruction of business in the Burning Sun club. On November 8, 2022, Kim was found guilty of one of three sexual assault charges, obstruction of business and defamation. The court ordered a suspended sentence for one year in prison and two years of probation, along with the completion of a 40-hour sexual assault treatment program and 80 hours of community service. Two men who were involved in the initial assault complaint filed by Kim against the club were also sentenced, a club director named Jang received eight months in prison and two years probation, and another man named Choi was fined.

== Investigative reporting ==
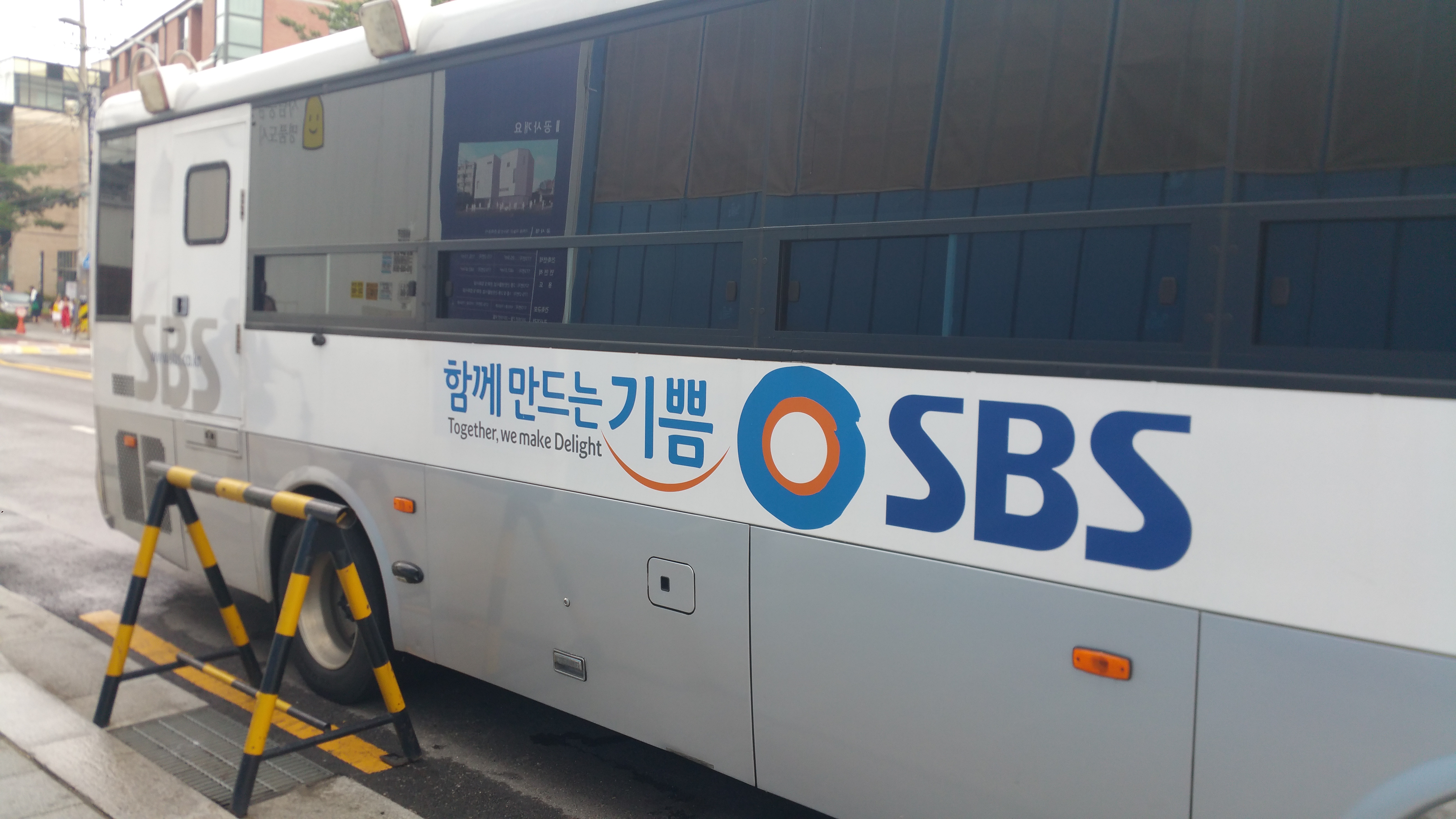
SBS VIP bus, Bukchon Hanok Village, Seoul.

The SBS investigative reporter who examined the KakaoTalk chat messages sent by the whistleblower to the television station SBS funE was Kang Kyung-yoon. Her previous work included reporting on the corruption cases related to former President Park Geun-hye. When she started interviewing some of the victims of the videos, she found they did not know of their existence. She said, "Some of them begged, 'Please save me. How do I live after this?'" She said they were ashamed and angry but feared "wearing a scarlet letter as a sex crime victim", and so feared being identified. Kang said that the sex video investigation was seen by some people as a means to avert attention away from the larger corruption scandal with its multiple allegations, but she perceived it as a serious social issue that needed reporting on.

At the end of March 2019, Seungri told the director of SBS's investigative program, Unanswered Questions, in a text message, that the lawyer, whistleblower, and journalist were responsible for all the criminal allegations against him, had not checked facts properly and had "ruined his career for their own personal gain". In June, the production team of Unanswered Questions (also called I Want to Know) received the Seoul's Gender Equality Award Grand Prize, in part for their coverage of the scandal.

On November 25, 2019, following the suicide of idol Goo Hara, Kang said that Goo, who had undergone public harassment over a sex video that was threatened to be shared by her ex-boyfriend, had contacted her to offer support. In a 2024 BBC documentary, SBS reporter Kang, and another female newspaper reporter, Park Hyo-sil, revealed having received online harassment from Jung's fans and death threats during early days of the investigation. It was also revealed that Goo had a pivotal role in revealing the identity of police officer Yoon Gyu-geun. Goo was a friend of Choi and convinced him to reveal Yoon's identity to Kang. Following the release of BBC documentary Yoon Gyu-geun, now 54, was transferred to the Seoul Metropolitan Police Agency offices from his position as the head of the crime prevention response department in Songpa District, east of Gangnam, where he had been promoted at the beginning of 2024.

== Investigation summary ==
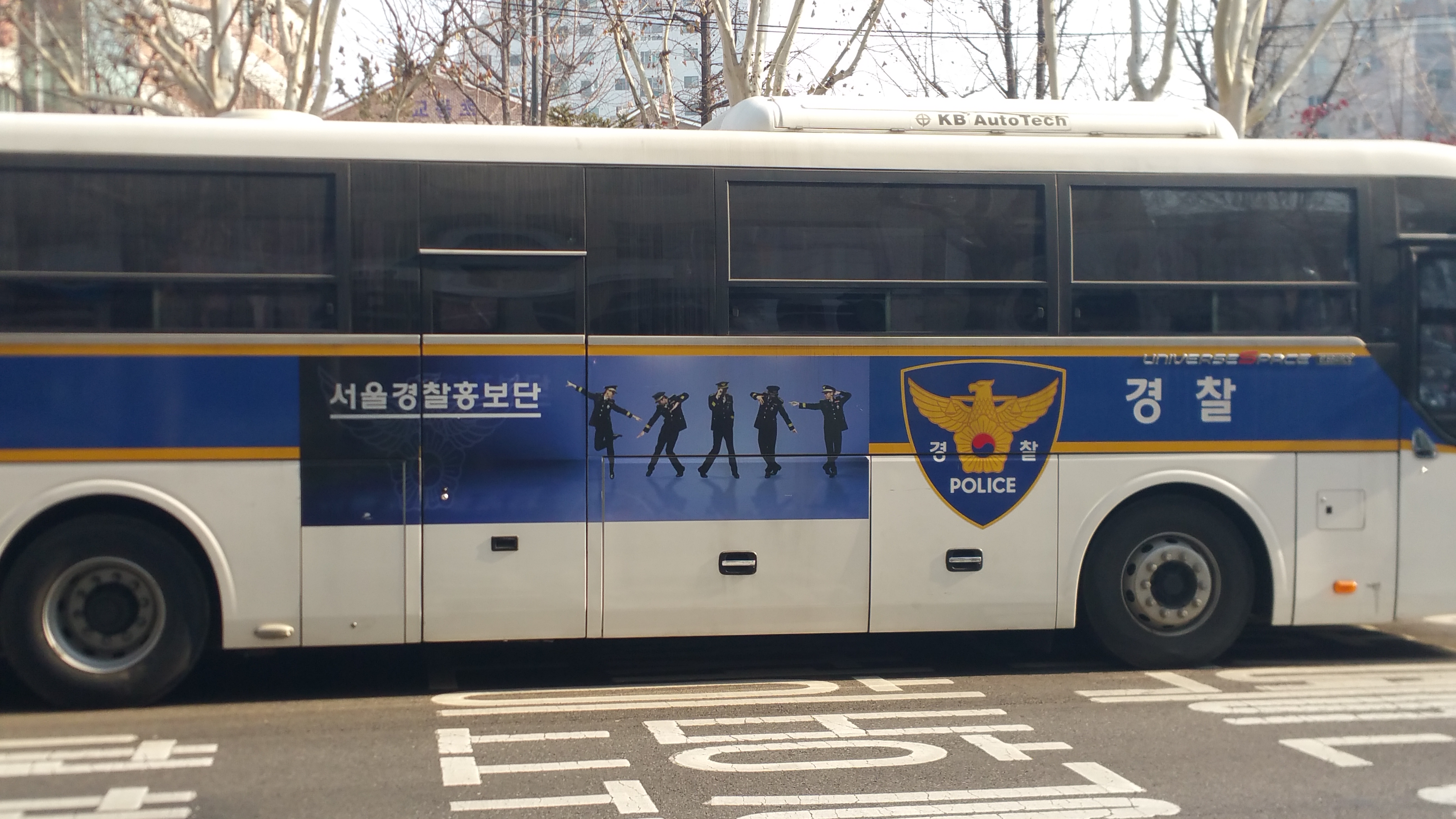
Korean National Police Agency KNPA, press bus, Jongno District, Seoul.

During the course of the investigation, SMPA focused on the Burning Sun club and its affiliates. Police conducted searches at the Burning Sun club, at the homes of CEO Moon and a sales executive Han, as well as at Burning Sun Entertainment, YG Entertainment, Yuri Holdings, Junwon Industries and Club Arena (and at the Seoul Regional Office of the National Tax Service of South Korea related to allegations of tax evasion). The investigation found a 2.45 billion won (US$2.15 million) investment to the Burning Sun, with the Taiwanese investor having contributed 1 billion won and Seungri having contributed 225 million won. Yonhap News Agency reported that one of the club's investors, perhaps Junwon Industries (also called Cheonwon Industry and a major shareholder in Burning Sun Entertainment which operated Burning Sun), Le Méridien Seoul's operator, may have forged a connection with the hotel, in the amount of $8.8 million, using the intermediary firm to attract larger investments to the club. Junwon CEO Choi Tae-young was charged with embezzling funds, along with Seungri and Yoo. A Burning sun employee Ahn, who worked as a female Taiwanese investor's Korean guide, was booked for embezzlement charges, and the possibility of any Triad investments or organized crime connections were investigated with Interpol and other agencies. Burning Sun's female Taiwanese investor Lin was also booked on charges of embezzlement, in collusion with Seungri and Yoo.

Seungri was investigated for allegedly: supplying prostitutes for investors, sharing an illicit photo of a woman in Jung's chatroom, giving concert tickets to a police officer Yoon, and embezzlement of funds from the clubs Monkey Museum and the Burning Sun. Seungri's business partner and CEO of Yuri Holdings, Yoo In-seok, age 34, was investigated for connections to Gangnam police officer Yoon, embezzling Monkey Museum and the Burning Sun's funds, and for supplying prostitutes, along with Seungri. CEO's Lee Sung-hyun and Lee Moon-ho, both age 29, were investigated for allegedly hiring minors as security guards and for bribing former Gangnam police officer Kang with 20 million won (US$17,700) to cover up an underage drinking issue at the club, the latter which Lee Sung-hyun admitted to doing, at a hearing for Kang. YG head Yang and singer Psy were questioned as witnesses about additional allegations of sex-for-favors involving Yang and foreign guests Jho Low and Chavanos Rattakul. Allegations which they both denied, and the case was eventually closed for lack of proof.

Arrests related to Burning Sun included CEO Lee Moon-ho who was detained and charged with drug use and distributing drugs to Burning Sun customers. Others included a Burning Sun board member Jang, the alleged attacker of clubgoer Kim Sang-kyo, a chat group member named Kim who distributed illicit videos, and a Club Arena security guard Yoon, accused of attacking a guest in 2017. A Chinese promoter, nicknamed Anna, age 26, was investigated for drug use and distribution, but no arrest was made. An owner of Arena, Kang Mo, age 46, and a "puppet head" of the club, surnamed Lin, were arrested on charges of tax evasion, alleged to have not paid taxes in the amount of 16.2 billion won (US$14.31 million) between 2014 and 2017. On April 11, SMPA said 59 persons had been apprehended related to drug use and distribution charges in the Burning Sun scandal, and 11 were under arrest.

Former Gangnam police officer Kang, age 44, was arrested for allegations of brokering between the Burning Sun and other police officers, and booked for assisting with an underage drinking incident at the Burning Sun, which co-CEO Lee Sung-hyun admitted to paying him for. Police firings and investigations included a senior superintendent Yoon, who knew Yoo, and assisted with the underage drinking incident and Monkey Museum's business zoning violations, and was charged with violating the Improper Solicitation and Graft Act for receiving concert tickets from Seungri.

In peripheral investigations, police announced over 500 drug related arrests on March 25, 2019, after declaring "total war" against drug crime on February 25, due to the scandal at the Burning Sun. Of the 523 arrests for the use and distribution of drugs, 216 were detained. 421 cases, or 82 percent, involved psychotomimetic drugs like GHB, a common date rape drug, and one alleged to have been used at the Burning Sun. On May 30, SMPA reported to have arrested nearly 4,000 people at 148 entertainment establishments on drug related charges in the three month crackdown after the scandal started. Some 920 of those were detained; 886 for drug related crimes, 23 for sexual assault or rape while under the influence of drugs, and 11 for taking illegal videos during drug use. Most were in their 20s and 30s, and about 40 percent of the crimes involved the use of the drug ecstasy.

== Women's issues and public protests ==
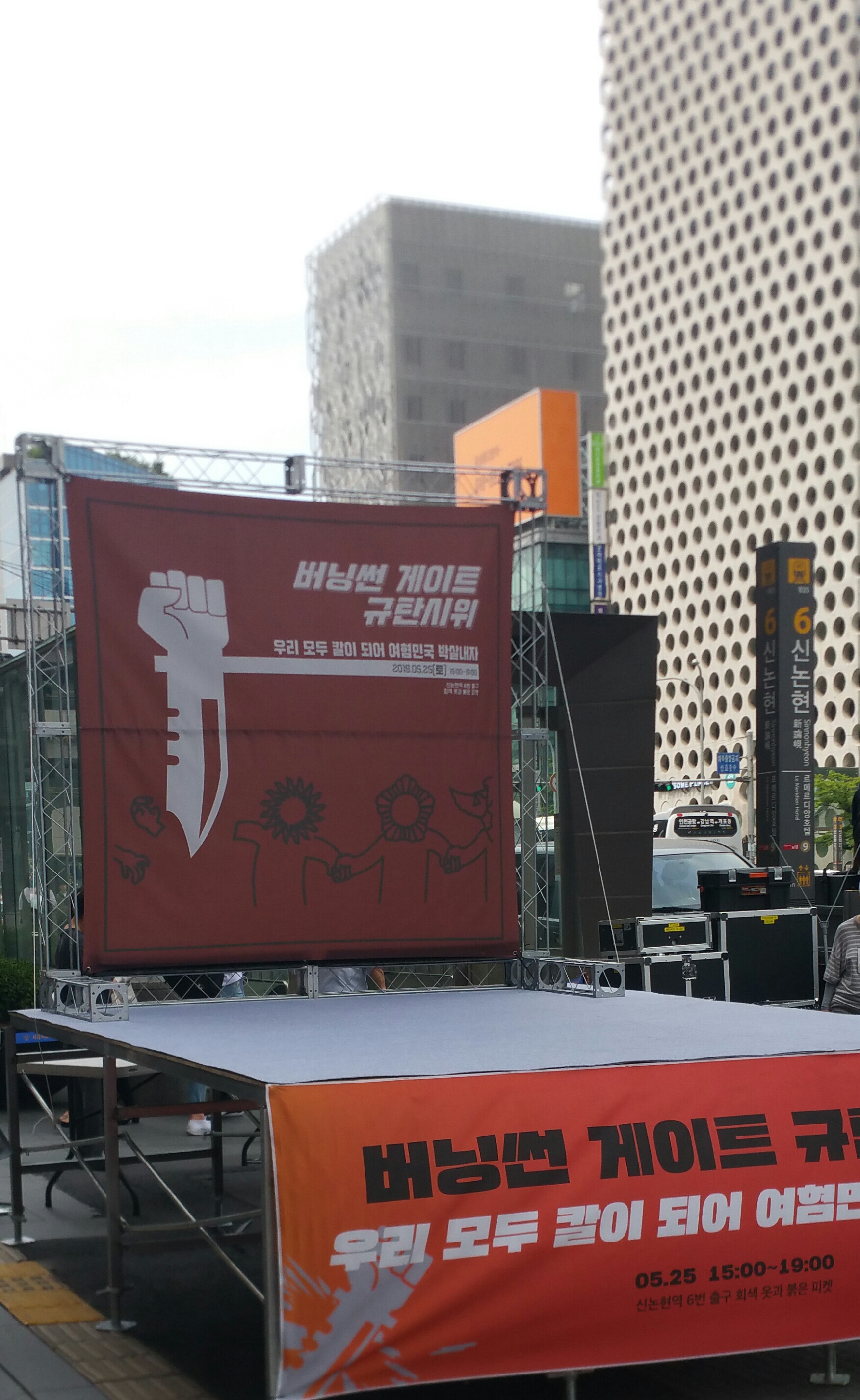
Protest rally, Sinnonhyeon Station Exit 6, (Le Méridien Hotel), Gangnam, May 25, 2019.

The scandal ignited public protests early in March 2019, and later, after police attempts to arrest Seungri and Yoo fell through. A May 17 press conference held by women's rights groups, in front of the SMPA, criticized the results of the three month Burning Sun investigation, conducted by some 152 officers, as "dismal", with allegations of the club's "cozy" ties with police, and the illegal filming of women and distribution still unresolved. Weekend rallies condemning the investigation's results started at the Blue House on May 19 and in Gangnam on May 25. Lee Taek-kwang, a professor at Kyung Hee University said, "The recent Burning Sun nightclub scandal exposed a culture that exploits women, which has brought about public rage." Months later, on November 6, members of seven civic and women's groups, including the Green Party Korea and the Korean Cyber Sexual Violence Response Center (KCSVRC) held a press conference and protest in front of the SMPA Jongno District building demanding the resignation of KNPA's Commissioner Min Gap-ryong, criticizing the police investigations of the Jang Ja-yeon and Burning sun cases as biased and poorly conducted.

The scandal added to ongoing discussions of women's issues in South Korea — gender inequality, the budding Me Too movement in South Korea, feminism, "molka", prostitution, and the K-pop industry's attitude towards women. South Korea's #MeToo movement began in January 2018 and was followed by a students' #SchoolMeToo, which became the most tweeted social issue in South Korea in 2018, followed by "feminism", then "molka", the abbreviation for "spy cameras that are hidden in places such as public bathrooms and for the explicit videos later posted on porn sites". In July 2018, thousands marched in Seoul against spy cameras and the government responded by hiring workers to monitor public bathrooms, but activists criticized a general dismissive attitude towards the crimes, citing a "deeply rooted gender inequality and misogyny in the country". A 2018 OECD ranking of the country, at 30 out of 36 for women's employment, exemplifed the country's gender pay gap, while it ranked highly for women's education. Jung's distribution of sex videos was one of the top gender issues talked about on online platforms in South Korea for the first half of 2019, with research showing a growing trend of gender based topics, most in a negative context.

Talks included the K-pop industry, which critics had blamed for sexualizing women; Jang Yun-mi, a spokesperson for the Korean Women Lawyer's Association said, "The industry in Korea … is a boys' club". Women's rights activist Bae Bok-ju said of the spycam allegations in the scandal, "This case just shows that male K-pop stars are no exception when it comes to being part of this very disturbing reality that exploits women". But, Seoul freelance journalist Haeryun Kang opined in The Washington Post, "The most recent celebrity scandal has generated fury among so many Korean women not because it is unique but because the story goes far beyond K-pop. The patterns of male behavior feel disturbingly familiar. The gender power dynamics — that often objectify women into sex tools — feel exhaustingly repetitive", and said the scandal was more than "misogyny and spy cameras", but a larger story of the Burning Sun nightclub's "alleged involvement in prostitution, drug trafficking and police corruption".

== Effects on entertainment industry ==
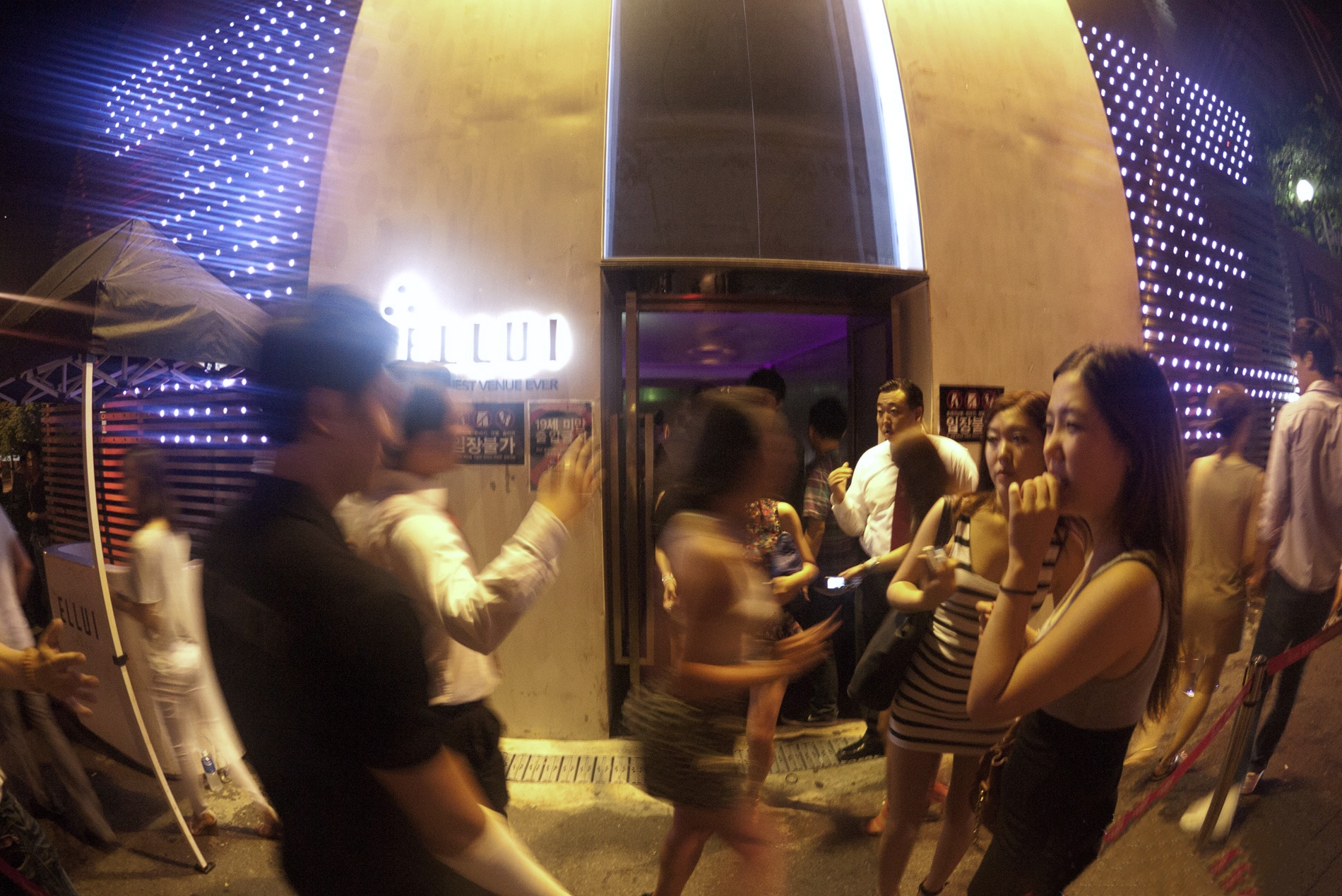
Outside

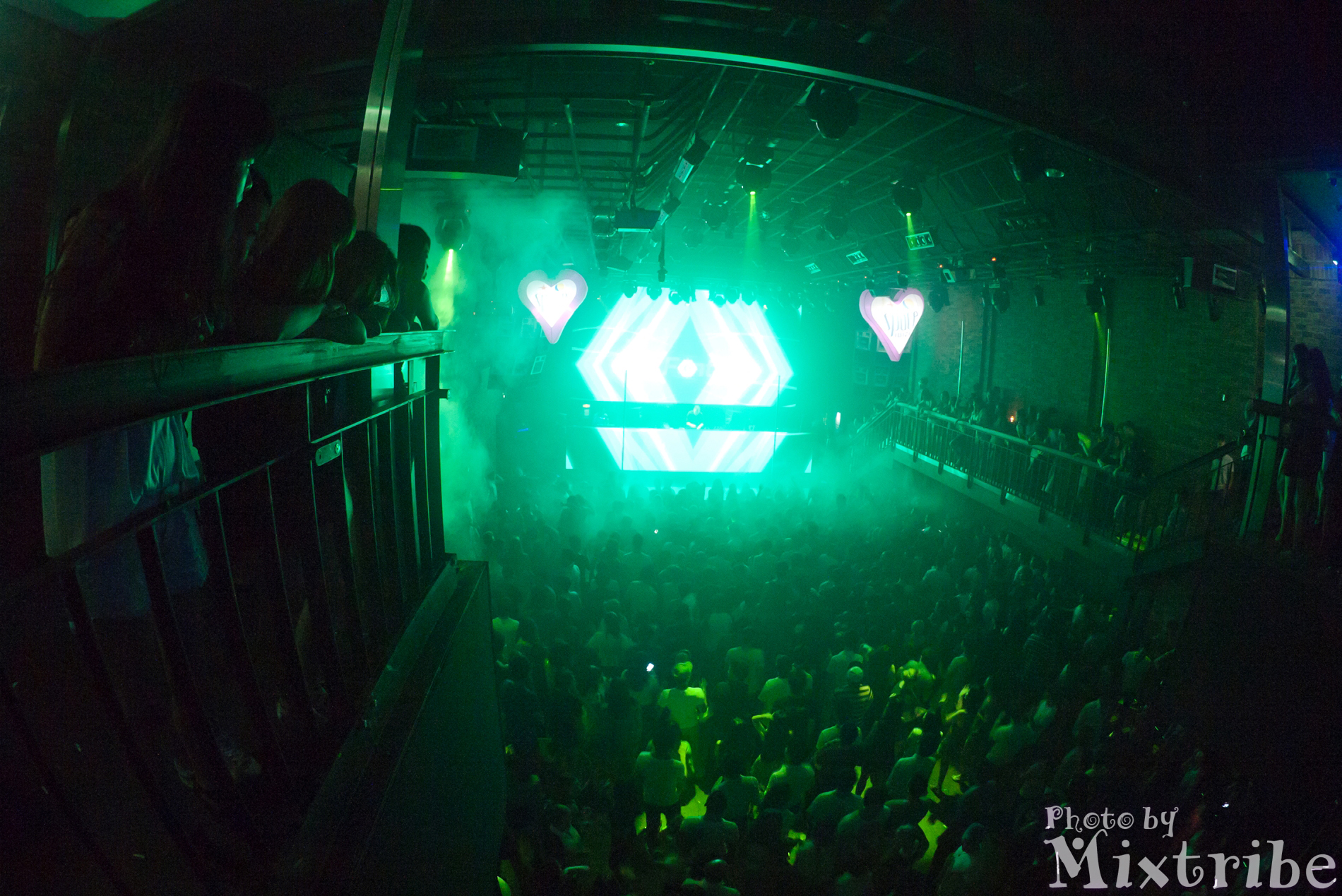
Inside

Gangnam nightclub, Ultra Korea (UMF) 2012, after-party at Club Ellui, Seoul.

Between February 25 and March 15, 2019, five major South Korean entertainment companies lost 17.52 percent in value, with their market value dropping from 3.35 trillion won (around US$2.96 billion) to 2.76 trillion won. Stocks dropped for the "big three" K-pop management companies: YG Entertainment (Seungri's company), 24.8 percent, SM Entertainment, 20 percent, JYP Entertainment, 5.5 percent; and additional 20 percent drops for Cube Entertainment and FNC Entertainment. But, on April 11, while the scandal was still under investigation, entertainment companies were forecast by experts (FinGuide Inc. and a Hyundai Motor Securities analyst) to post solid profit growth in 2019, with substantial operating profits for the three big labels; while others added that K-pop's financial reliance on YouTube was unlikely to be affected. However, by September 16, YG Entertainment stocks had dropped by nearly half since January 7.

Actress Park Han-byul, who married Yoo of Yuri Holdings in 2017, first stated that she knew nothing more than his being Seungri's business partner, but made a public apology on March 19, after it was reported that she and her husband had played golf previously with the high-ranking police official under investigation for collusion with the nightclubs in the scandal. She said she would not leave a major role in the television drama Love in Sadness, despite calls from some viewers for her to do so.

YG Entertainment discontinued sales of merchandise featuring Seungri, and major networks and cable companies deleted episodes of programs both Seungri and Jung had appeared in. Yang resigned from the agency on June 14, amidst allegations of police collusion to cover up the case.

Seoul's EDM festivals responded that they would not hold after-parties in 2019 in Gangnam's clubs, due to the Burning Sun police investigation. The festivals were often promoted in association with entertainment clubs and Ultra Korea, Seoul World DJ Festival and Spectrum Dance Music Festival all held after-parties in 2018 at the Burning Sun, among other clubs. An organizer for the largest, Ultra Korea, said that due to the scandal's allegations of sex crimes involving GHB or "mulpong", and cannabis use at festivals, plans were being made to mobilize detection dogs, bag checks and X-rays for monitoring drug trafficking this year.

Gangnam's nightclubs, usually "a pilgrimage site for K-pop fans", immediately saw a tapering of Chinese tourists, followed by a general decline of customers to nightclubs and lounge bars. Bars that were registered as general restaurants with the Ministry of Food and Drug Safety, where dancing is not allowed, a tactic used by clubs in the Burning Sun scandal to avoid paying higher taxes, underwent a strict monitoring, causing a subdued atmosphere with "Please do not dance" signs posted and police checking in, to enforce the rule. In late October, France's Ministry of Europe and Foreign Affairs released an informational report (not a travel alert) for travelers to South Korea, advising caution due to reported cases of GHB and assault drugs at clubs in Hongdae, Itaewon and Gangnam, following earlier French media reports of the Burning Sun scandal.

After internet users raised rumors about the possible involvement of several actresses in the scandal, Go Joon-hee, who was managed by YG Entertainment in 2015, first objected on social media, then filed a libel suit for defamation against twelve of them, citing damages to her career, and Han Hyo-joo filed a criminal complaint against thirty-three more. Other actresses and their agencies made denials and warned of legal actions, and at least seven (which included college students, the unemployed, construction workers, and one U.S. citizen) were arrested and referred for prosecution.

Some scenes from a 2019 South Korean film, By Quantum Physics: A Nightlife Venture, about a celebrity drug scandal at a nightclub, were filmed at the Burning Sun nightclub before it closed down. Although it was not based on the real-life scandal, Director Lee Sung-tae said he reconsidered one of the film's scenes, as they were editing as it was ongoing.

A November 2019 retrospective article, written by Matthew Campbell and Sohee Kim for Bloomberg Businessweek, pointed out that the K-pop industry, in general, had ignored the scandal, with "no organized demands for better behavior from male stars or serious discussions about revamping how idols are trained." They quoted a former SM Entertainment executive, Jeong Chang-hwan, on its implicit impact, "It's a huge lesson in what not to do," he says. "The best teacher for young idols is to see fellow idols get into a scandal and disappear from the industry."

== Public response ==
Allegations of police misconduct and corruption in the scandal added public support to a government proposal to create an independent investigative agency, first announced by President Moon in July 2017, and still undergoing political debate. Proposed to "uncover wrongdoing by high-level government officials and their relatives", with the power to take over prosecutions, opponents had questioned its own potential for corruption.

K-pop fans' reactions were mixed, some called for YG Entertainment to remove Seungri from the group BigBang for tarnishing the group's image and having used the group's celebrity to promote his business, even waiting outside his agency's office for an explanation. However, other fans continued to support him.

The public appeared to boycott a noodle chain called Aori Ramen between January and April 2019, according to multiple store owners who filed a compensation lawsuit in July blaming Seungri, who had run and promoted the franchise, for falling sales.

Google Korea's most popular domestic searched terms for 2019 included Jung Joon-young ranked at number two over-all, and number one for top public figure; with Burning Sun ranked at number three for domestic news and issues. Yonhap News Agency editors selected the scandal as one of the top ten South Korean news stories of 2019.
