= Sexualization and sexual exploitation in K-pop =

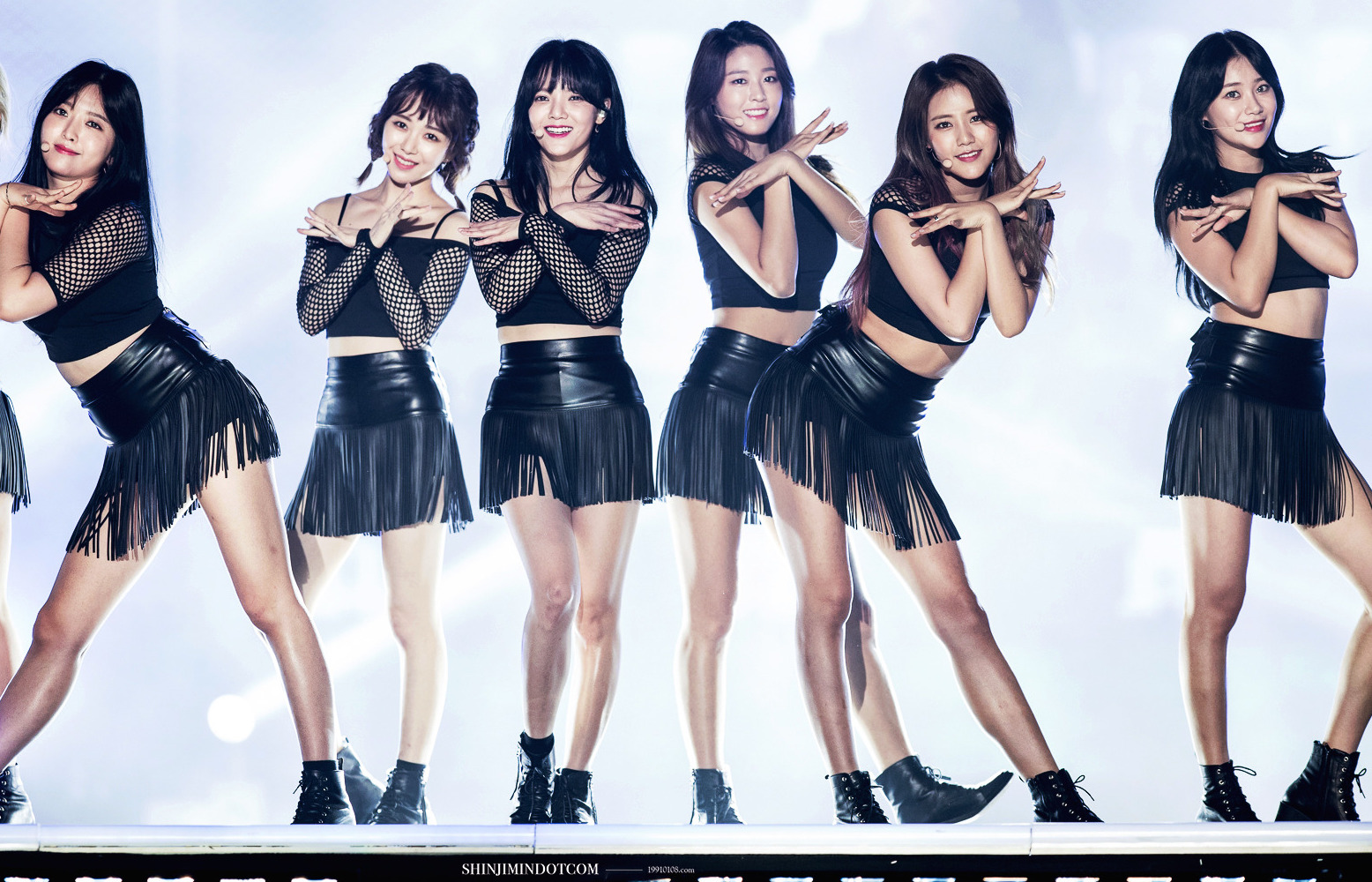
Girl group AOA at the Incheon Hallyu Tourism Concert in 2016. The band is known for their hit song "Miniskirt".

Sexualization and sexual exploitation in K-pop refers to elements of sexualization and sexual exploitation in K-pop (Korean pop), refers to matters surrounding the usage of sexualized imagery, exaggerated beauty standards, and exploitative labor practices within the South Korean pop music entertainment industry. Experts noted that the K-pop industry expanded globally during the 21st century. During the K-pop culture globalization, with Korean entertainment and record label companies taking advantage of the boom to promote their idols in various ways. Many argue that this boom is the beginning to the ever rising exploitation of idols.

Researchers have discussed that female idols are often associated with strict beauty standards. Aside from dance and singing abilities, many focus on an idol’s visuals. Visuals are so significant to the extent that many K-pop idol groups assign a specific member the job of bringing the “visual” of the group. The “visual” refers to the “most” conventionally attractive beauty of the group. Intricate standards from slim body types, hour glass figures, long legs, and youthful appearances are often the main focus during idol appearances. Male idols on the other hand are frequently expected to balance traditionally masculine traits, such as strength and confidence, with softer and more approachable characteristics. They are often expected to balance a perfect amount of masculinity with just enough femininity to appeal to the largest possible audience.

Sexualization has been identified in several areas of the K-pop industry. Sexualization and exploitation of idols are notably seen in music videos, choreography, fashion styling, promotional content, and fan service. Some scholars argue that female idols are more frequently objectified than male idols. The over-use of revealing outfits, overly suggestive choreography (often performed by minors), and mature concepts reveal why this industry is often criticized for unfair labor practices.

== Historical context ==
The advent of modern K-pop arguably started in 1992, the genre gained significant foothold by 1996 during the industrialization of K-pop, matured through the mid 2000s, and flourished by 2010. Though beauty is an ever-present ideal for Korean popular culture, these time periods represent shifts in beauty norms and K-pop ideals. The early 1990s brought a young, individualistic cuteness to the scene with stocky builds and chubby faces, following the Korean beauty norms of the 1980s.

Following the 1980s Japanese idol system, idol groups were generated in the late 1990s with innocence and sunny dispositions. During this time a review committee censored all Korean music and music videos for sexual and explicit content. The committee was disbanded in June 1996. After an economic crisis in 1997 and success of K-pop outside South Korea, the innocence morphed into a more romantic and hipper image in the early 2000s. This presented the first major signs of sexualization.

This transformation was aided by the increased use of music videos. By the mid-2000s, a new generation of K-pop was born, sex became prevalent in K-pop and idol-worshiping adolescents came into being. Within a decade, maturation of K-pop driven by hyper-popularized music videos, propelled idols into a visual medium, thus transforming K-pop into the modern beauty standard of low body fat, well-toned muscles, and perfected body features.

=== Globalization ===
The late 2000s brought K-pop into its modern era and introduced it to the international stage with the Korean wave in Asia. The early 2010s bolstered K-pop to an international powerhouse with the global Korean wave. K-pop has always been influenced by Japanese and western musical styles; however, many link its international success to the globalization caused by the International Monetary Fund (IMF) bailout period (during the 1997 South Korean economic crash) in South Korea's neo-liberalization.

Post-IMF South Korea incorporated more westernized (specifically, Americanized) culture into their exported products in order to prosper in international sales, thus pressing the popular music industry to become more westernized. Integration of westernization has now also brought the hyper-sexualization of products, especially in the popular music scene. Not only was the music itself altered to enhance exportability, but given the modern age of the music video, the performer was also altered.

Combining this with Korea's male-dominated society, one that currently ranks the near the bottom of the Global Gender Gap list for modernized societies (presenting the largest gender wage and working condition gaps), produces an overtly sexualized popular music market. Additionally, the proliferation of K-pop allows for South Korea to enter and even dominate the global "cultural war", a concept tied to a battle for attention between the globalized cultures in the modern era. Thus, the government of South Korea encourages the use of K-pop to promote global recognition.

However, because of the turbulence of popular culture which is largely due to sexualization, the government maintains no official backing of K-pop but restrains limiting what are allowable K-pop activities. Ergo, without official sponsorship of K-pop, the government unofficially helps it by reducing governmental constraints on it, especially for exported products. This allows the idols to become an unofficial representation of the South Korean culture, promoting cultural pride and building the nation into an "idol republic", meaning that their image (i.e. bodies) belong to the state and represent the state's people.

== Overview ==
=== Economic reasoning ===
Entering the world market to help globalize marketable Korean culture was only a byproduct of the economic conditions behind K-pop's evolution. Early K-pop was not well received critically, but its catchiness and localization enamored the masses. South Korea was reeling from an economic recession in the 1990s, and the success was noticed by a few business-oriented musicians that soon capitalized on the situation. Industrialization of K-pop occurred around the mid 1990s and its popularity just continued to grow.

Korean popular culture was largely unknown and overshadowed by Japan as well as its neighbors, and maintaining localization while hybridizing with Japan's idol methodology and American-style popular music stylings helped bolster success internally and as an export, albeit initially limited. The promising external success in conjunction with the diverse extant musical acts drove the music industry to facilitate portfolio diversification of their performing groups to maximize success and profits. This meant optimized pandering to the most consumers. Such optimization lead to increasing numbers of performers per group, each individualized to suit different consumers' tastes, perfecting the performances, and increasing attractiveness of the group to the different consuming cultures.

Therefore, a K-pop group itself there could consist of a proverbial "good", "bad", cute, or sexy member, while the whole group increased in attractiveness. Also, combining the desires of American musical culture for blatant sexiness, Korean culture for aegyo, which was influenced by the Japanese kawaii and patriarchal Lolita ideas made a complex interplay of diverse satisfaction of fantastical desires. Following this logic, the music companies substantially invested monetarily and temporally in each performer in an effort to tailor them. A base level of attractiveness and skill is required to be considered as a performer. Years of subsequent training and discipline mold performers into what the public wants to see. They are disallowed from dating to maintain innocence, have a directed public life and persona and shamed for gaining weight or not keeping their appearance up. They may also be required to go through plastic surgery for beautification, and are required to interact with fans in a desirable manner.

=== Femininity ===
As the flagship cultural commodities of South Korea, female K-pop singers are often expected to be sexy, strong, and independent, in conjunction with being a product for the patriarchal South Korean capitalist society, which urges them to be submissive, innocent, cute, and lovable. To maximize profit and success, the female stars must have the guise of ambiguity. Ultimately, the ambiguity results in a Madonna-whore complex, which many female K-pop groups navigate. However, some of the singers may be more biased to one side than the other. South Korean ideals nominally press an aegyo image, or one that is "attractive and desirable beyond limits of intimate relations", providing vulnerability to the idols but keeping them whimsical.

Dollification is a construct of placing sexual desire upon a submissive and uncorrupted object of beauty, something common to Korea due to traditional gender roles and patriarchal structure. This applies exceptionally well to the surgically beautified K-pop females. Additionally, dolls are often associated with prostitution or sexual favors, something that idol singers can face when exploited by their employers. Dollification also plays into the Japanese desire for submissive kawaii: dolls are inherently cute and can be controlled at will, something that quenches the yearning for totally submissive females. Similarly, the concept of middle-aged males seeing themselves as Samchon-fans (uncle-fans), or endearing uncles to the idols, has been argued as a facade to deny sexual desire when there is actually an underlying sexual gratification from the female bodies.

This makes the female idol fill a Lolita role, one which fulfills a market need by supplying a male pedophilic fantasy of a young female with unconscious sexuality. Consequently, girl (female) bodies have become a commodity and given implicit subjugation in the patriarchal structure, the consumption of such is acceptable. The females may present "girl power" given their high popularity status, but their pawn-like nature under their parent companies keeps this a novelty, not a reality, via pacification. Although themes of female empowerment, such as slogans like “I am the queen” and “the world is centered on me,” have become more visible in K-pop, many of these representations are developed by male-led production teams and are primarily aimed at enhancing commercial appeal. In Girls' Generation’s The Boys music video, the members wear revealing short skirts and tight pants, constructing an image of the "ideal" woman that aligns with patriarchal aesthetic standards. At the same time, lyrics such as "Soon as I step on the scene, I know that they'll be watching me" convey a sense of female confidence and empowerment. The tension between the visual representation and the lyrical message highlights the dual accommodation and contradiction between the narrative of female empowerment and the persistence of the male gaze within the commercialized packaging of K-pop girl groups. Academic Yeran Kim argued that the justified objectification of girl bodies in such an idol republic, promoted economically and governmentally, makes South Korea a de facto "Lolita republic". More simply, the beauty of their bodies can belong to a national collective. This beauty and femininity in image is prominently described as that of long legs with "honey thighs", a perfect face and body, while showing ample skin. Breasts are often sexualized, but have only recently been presented as cleavage in K-pop due to the lack of cleavage shown in the general Korean culture.

=== Masculinity ===
Male idols are commodities to be sexualized in an effort to maximize profit and success. Given the rigorous patriarchal gender roles existing in Korea, the males are normally subjected to the requirement of Korean masculinity. However, to optimize for diverse target audiences, they often present vulnerabilities, forming a non-Korean masculinity. Korean hegemonic masculinity can consist of patriarchal authority, traditional Confucian masculinity, and showing great strength.

This dichotomy forces bands to be muscular, potent, and appearing sexually virile, while injecting cuteness and innocence into their presentation. This creates a multinational "soft masculinity" and "global masculinity". This results in both a soft masculinity called "flower boys", and a harder masculinity, called "beast idols", within male K-pop groups.

The key features of K-pop masculinity are muscular and often nude torsos and cute actions/personalities. Well-defined muscles, albeit a falsity, can be considered a sign of both individual phallic power in response to feministic movements and nationalistic female desires. This is exemplified by a "body price" (momgap) notion that equates the sexiness of a male body to his worth, with "chocolate abs" being the most desirable trait.

== Manifestation ==
Sexualization of the popular Korean music market takes place in many forms: pushing sexy and attractive performers, conforming the performers to fan fantasies, and presenting sexualized songs or music videos.

=== Dollification ===
Dollification can be observed in K-pop, with entertainment companies utilized doll images for advertisement. The idol G.NA's body measurements were a hot topic with fans, so her employer promoted her, by juxtaposing her with mannequins during photoshoots while calling her body "the mannequin body". This was due to her small face, large breasts, and tiny waist.

This representation of a dollified human parallels Girls' Generation's "Gee" music video, in which the members are acting as mannequins in a shop's window that soon come alive or Girl's Day's music video for "Tilt my Head", in which the members act like doll factory automata producing self-similar dolls that magically come alive (both also following the "coming alive" narrative). Countering the description of a perfect doll image is the group Piggy Dolls, consisting of three heavier set females, engendering diversity in body image.

=== Female idol bodies ===
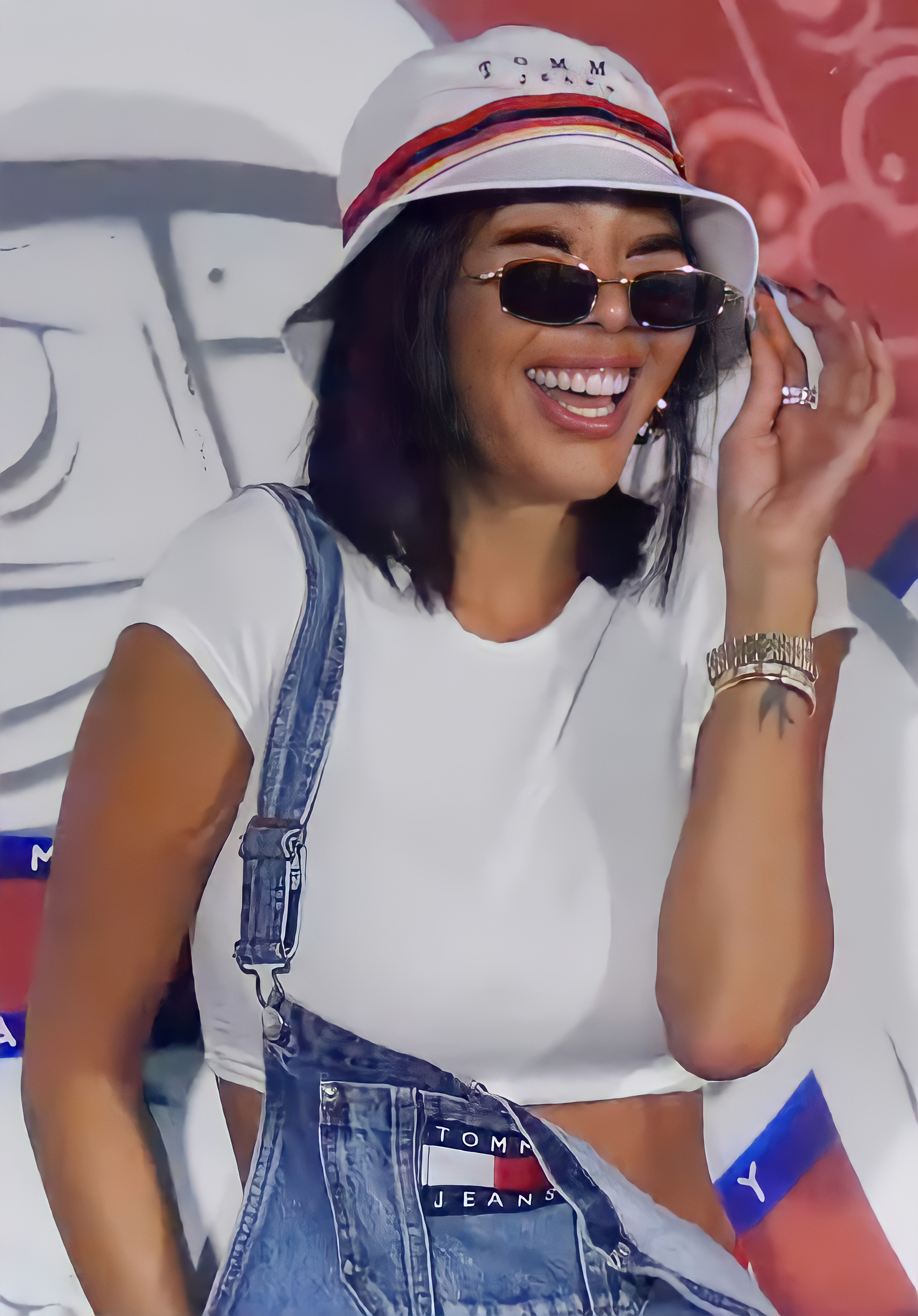
The musician Jessi has been candid about her plastic surgery.

In general, female K-pop idols' bodies are heavily regulated by their employers with the expectation that they conform to certain image norms, and their bodies are heavily sexualized by fans. The members of Girls' Generation are known for their long legs, and as a result have been nicknamed "The Beautiful Legs Group" and a Japanese pornographic film has been made which focuses on their legs.

Bodily perfection is a requirement of the profit-driven entertainment industry, consequently, female idols are expected to be thin and beautiful. K-pop idols that are not thin enough are expected to lose weight. The three members of The Piggy Dolls, who were originally larger than most female K-pop idols, were put through training to lose a total of 56 kg for a comeback. For K-pop trainees whose faces are not considered beautiful enough, their employer may enforce mandatory plastic surgery. Not getting a mandatory surgery can mean career failure. Although any surgery is dangerous and can have complications, it is very common for K-pop idols to have undergone small aesthetic plastic surgeries and moderately common to have undergone semi-reconstructive surgeries. Common modifications are a double-eyelid addition, rhinoplasty, chin augmentation, and muscular reshaping (mainly of the legs).

There are some idols who have openly admitted to aesthetic surgeries, such as Miryo of Brown Eyed Girls who had a double eyelid surgery, Goo Hara of Kara who had an eyelid alteration, and Jessi who had breast implants, rhinoplasty, and eyelid surgery. Some even act as spokespeople for plastic surgery offices, such as G.Na who advertises the services of Dr. Jong Phil. However, most artists keep enhancements private, so there is great conjecture of whether K-pop idols have had plastic surgery, including even the biggest names, such as members of Girls' Generation and Hyuna. With so much conjecture, some K-pop artists, such as Lee Hyori and Jang Yoon-Ju, have even gone so far as to medically prove they have had no breast augmentation. On the other hand, some artists openly embrace cosmetic surgery. The group Six Bomb has even made a song and music video called "Getting Pretty After" in reference to cosmetic surgery. In fact, their manager, Kim Il-woong, has openly admitted that all the members have had surgical augmentations to their faces and breasts. This candor, together with the idolization of K-pop artists, has influenced many young Korean's to desire plastic surgery in an effort to emulate their favorite stars. South Korea has the most cosmetic surgeries per capita out of anywhere in the world.

=== Male idol bodies ===
Males are likewise subjected to rigorous body standards, with a requirement to keep up their "body price" while balancing their soft masculinity. The singer Rain is the embodiment of effeminate hyper-masculinity. His well-defined abs and upper muscular body, often seen naked and oiled (or wet), is contrasted to his cute and young face. He is described as having "an angelic face and a killer body" or "a man's body with a boy's face". Rain is an exemplary of the image required: shirtless, muscular male, with some grounding cute elements. To keep this image, rigorous training is required, normally employing trainers and intense daily workout routines.

As with their female counterparts, entertainment companies often coerce them to undergo plastic surgery. Similarly, conjecture exists for those who had undergone surgery, but again, some idols have explicitly stated their surgical augmentations. For example, Kwanghee of ZE:A had eyelid, nose, and forehead alterations, Heechul from Super Junior had eyelid alterations and fixed remnants of a past broken nose with surgery, and his co-star Kyuhyun had a double eyelid surgery following his parents' example.

=== Sexualization in YouTube music videos ===
Given the popularization of K-pop through visual social media such as YouTube, many fans would most recognize sexualization in music videos or recorded performances. The advent of music videos to help brand recognition brought a survival-of-the-fittest attitude to the images of the artists; that is, the sexier artists survived. As a result, sexual content has increased in K-pop music videos. A video content analysis by Bohye Song of MelOn Hot 100 chart listings of the most popular Korean music videos of 2004, 2005, 2014, and 2015 analyzed their sexual content and increases over time. Content observed were sexual innuendos, sexual acts, and provocative clothing. The results were broken down into four parts of changes in physical affection, provocative dress, suggestiveness, and gender variance. It was found that displayed physical affections did not change on average, but implicit sex increased, sexual suggestiveness increased, provocative clothing increased, and female lead singers showed a significant increase in provocative display.

This means that there is a significant increase in the display, mainly through clothing, of sexualized females and some males, but there is not much of an increase in sexual acts (two people in contact) depicted. This can be exemplified with modern music videos. Examples of K-pop music videos with revealing clothing on a female singer include "Marionette" by Stellar, "Roll Deep" by Hyuna, "Ring My Bell" by Girl's Day, "Wild" by Nine Muses, "Wiggle Wiggle" by Hello Venus, "Like a Cat" by AOA, "Butt" by I-Ren, and "Dr. Feel Good" by Rania, among many others. The female singers would often sport short skirts, short shorts, cleavage and tight clothing.

Correspondingly, male singers have worn see-through shirts and pants, extremely short shorts, and even corsets or skimpy dresses (in drag). Complementary to these are banned-from-broadcast videos, which include, but are not limited to, "Mommae" by Jay Park, due to overtly sexualized females; "Abracadabra" by Brown Eyed Girls, for being sexually suggestive; "Mirotic" by TVXQ, for body exposure and explicit language; "One More" by Fiestar, due to sexual imagery; both "Vibrato" and "Marionette" by Stellar, for sexually suggestive dancing and clothing; "Touch Me" by Ivy, for sexual imagery and suggestive lyrics; "Joker" by Dal Shabet, for sexual choreography; "Shower Later" by Gary, due to sexual innuendos and mature themes; and "Bae Bae" by Big Bang, for sexual innuendos. Lastly, the transition from innocent to sexualized can be shown by Girls' Generation music videos. Their video for "Gee" in 2009 maintained schoolgirl innocence, then their video for "Oh!" in 2010 kept their innocence, but added on a prelude to their dark side at the end when it pitted the innocent schoolgirl cheerleaders against sexier, shadowy versions of themselves. Finally, their 2011 video for "The Boys" replaced innocence with mature sexiness.

== Controversies ==
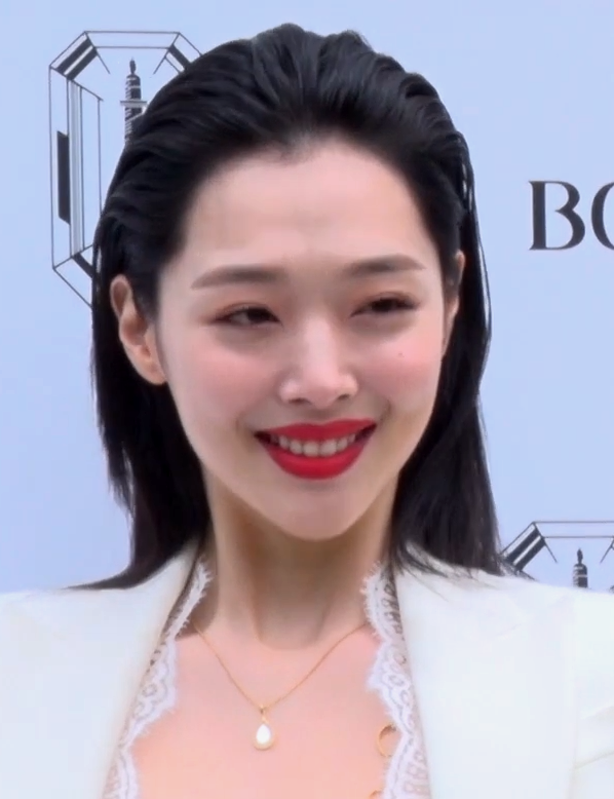
Sulli

=== Criticism for showing feminist behavior ===
Female Korean pop stars have faced strong criticism for expressing feminist opinions. Female K-pop idols are expected to be cute and beautiful while being obedient to public reception. Even showing an interest in female empowerment is considered controversial. K-pop stars who deviate and raise their voices have been publicly criticized and attacked.

For example, Sulli, who was known for being outspoken about feminism and women's rights, was a rarity among K-pop's tightly image-controlled stars. Because of this, the star endured years of online harassment and abuse which eventually pushed her into depression and suicide.

=== Gender inequalities ===
Women in K-pop are deliberately subjected to the male gaze, dollification, and being considered exotic and submissive for their masculine fans in a patriarchal society. Femininity is desired to coincide with the neo-Confucian patriarchal social structure so as to maximize profit; idols are normally forced into this definition in conjunction with Korea's inherently well-defined role for women. K-pop female groups face the paradox of stardom, as the industry's structural foundation is rooted in patriarchal society. This framework compels entertainment companies to shape female idols within an anti-feminist paradigm. With these anti-feminist expressions, Korean society is further encouraged to reinforce patriarchal values.

Additionally, with South Korea being below many of the developed countries by Xi Lin on the Global Gender Gap Report, it represents the general poor state of gender equality in South Korea.

Academics Xi Lin and Robert Rudolf conducted a survey of 6,317 K-pop fans from 100 countries to determine the egalitarianism of the K-pop consumers. Their study found that more K-pop indulgence correlated to less egalitarianism, with this being most notable in already gender stratified countries. Similarly, the stratification of genders in Korea is actually aided by the government and its patriarchal capitalism, and vice-versa. The "K-pop Ripple Effect" describes how fandoms are influenced by the patriarchal ideas expressed in K-pop, and how they amplify and spread these ideas more widely through the internet and social media, reaching more fans and broader audiences. That is, sexism and sexualization in K-pop support the success of South Korea's patriarchal capitalism, forcing norms of gender inequalities and the sexual objectification of female K-pop idols.

== See also ==
- Burning Sun scandal – Exposé of the widespread sex trafficking involving K-pop artists and Korean celebrities that had been going on for years and the resulting attempts in cover-ups
  - Jung Joon-young KakaoTalk chatrooms
- Mnet vote manipulation investigation
