= Jang Ja-yeon =

South Korean actress (1980–2009)

- 장자연
- Jang at the 45th Baeksang Arts Awards in February 2009
- Born: 25 January 1980; Jeongeup, South Korea
- Died: 7 March 2009 (aged 29); Seongnam, South Korea
- Cause of death: Suicide by hanging
- Occupation: Actress
- Years active: 2006–2009

Korean name
- Hangul: 장자연
- RR: Jang Jayeon
- MR: Chang Chayŏn

Jang Ja-yeon (Korean: 장자연; 25 January 1980 – 7 March 2009) was a South Korean actress. She was born in Jeongeup, South Korea. She debuted in the entertainment industry when she appeared in a television commercial in 2006. She was known for being part of the KBS television drama series Boys Over Flowers as Sunny, one of the antagonists of the series, at the time of her death. She died by suicide on 7 March 2009 at the age of 29.

At the time of her death, Jang had been suffering from depression, and it was revealed in 2019 that the initial investigation into her death in 2009 had been corrupt. The 2009 investigation had concluded that her death was a suicide, but the investigation was reopened in 2018. Her death caused a national scandal in 2009 when it was widely reported that she had been sexually and physically abused by a number of prominent entertainment executives during her career, including the CEO of Jang's former talent agency, The Contents Entertainment, Kim Sung-hoon. After three witness testified against the CEO, Kim was found guilty of abuse by the Korean courts, specifically of forcing girls from his agency to come to his birthday party where he forced them to sexually entertain the executives.

== Career ==
=== 2006–2009: Acting debut with Boys Over Flowers ===
Jang made her debut in 2006 in a television commercial. Her big break came in Boys Over Flowers playing the role of Sunny, one of a trio of girls who antagonize the female lead played by Ku Hye-sun. At the time of her death, Jang was awaiting the release of her first two films, They Are Coming and Penthouse Elephant.

Jang was known to have had difficulties with her management agency.

== Personal life ==
Since the death of her parents in a traffic accident in 1999, Jang had been living with her older sister and younger brother. Prior to her own death, Jang had been suffering from clinical depression and had received medical treatment for her condition during the past year.

== Death and later investigation ==
Jang died by suicide. She was found in her home in the Bundang District of Seongnam, Gyeonggi Province, on 7 March 2009. During a phone call at 3:30 p.m. that afternoon, Jang had complained to her sister about the "overwhelming stress" she was under, saying that she "wanted to die". Having later been unable to reach her on the phone, Jang's sister returned to their shared home at 7:42 p.m. to find her body.

A police investigation concluded that her death was a suicide, and found no evidence of foul play. Jang is believed to have killed herself at around 4:30 pm.

According to widespread South Korean entertainment news reports, it was believed that Jang claimed that her agent Kim Sung-hoon had regularly beaten her and forced her to sleep with a string of VIPs, including directors, media executives and CEOs. Kim Sung-hoon, who was in Japan, denied the accusations. It was unconfirmed that Jang wrote a 7-page note listing at least 31 names of media executives, CEOs, and directors that she claimed she was forced into having sex with. South Korean police have suppressed the full list. Later on, it was also reported that the 7-page note might not be written by Jang herself.

The former manager of Jang's management agency, Kim Sung-hoon, was arrested in Tokyo, Japan in June 2009 for overstaying his visa. Korean police requested Kim's extradition on a warrant related to Jang's death. At the time of his arrest, Kim stated that he "committed a crime in South Korea and overstayed in Japan to avoid being arrested". Twenty figures were investigated by the police, resulting in seven prosecutions. Kim was sentenced to one year in jail, two years of probation and 160 hours of community service.

Approximately 250,000 fans visited Jang's website on the day of her death to express their condolences, with a further 700,000 visiting the site the following day, while the entire cast of Boys Over Flowers paid their last respects at the mourning hall set up at the Seoul National University Hospital in Bundang. Jang's funeral was held there on 9 March, and was attended by family, friends and fellow actors, including Boys Over Flowers lead Ku Hye-sun. Her cremated remains were buried next to her parents in Jeongeup, North Jeolla Province.

In 2019, President Moon Jae-in issued a thorough re-investigation into Jang's case as well as a proper investigation into the Burning Sun scandal and the sex scandal of former high-ranking Ministry of Justice official, Kim Hak-eui. Jang's former labelmate, Yoon Ji-oh, came forward publicly with her testimony about the agency's mistreatment of Jang as a result of the reopened investigation into Jang's death. Later on, Jang's ex-boyfriend, Mr. Choi, came forward to suspect Yoon's intention as she was promoting her book regarding Jang's death and also receiving money via her crowdfunding accounts regarding the case. Choi declared that Yoon was not a friend of Jang and had never heard of Yoon's name when Jang was alive. Due to Yoon's inconsistent testimonies over the years and her other allegations of lies, defamation and fraud, the South Korean government has issued 3 arrest warrants on Yoon since October 2019, including one red arrest warrant by the International Criminal Police Agency (ICPO, Interpol) to arrest Yoon. Yoon is currently in Canada. Yoon is also being sued by the people from South Korea who donated money to her.

Due to the controversy of Jang's case and the rumors since Jang's death, all the accusations from the media could not be used as evidence to press charges on any figures involved. Thus, Jang's former manager, Kim Sung-hoon is the only person who has been arrested so far in this case.

== In film ==
Her case inspired the 2013 film Norigae.

== Filmography ==
=== Television ===
Year	Title	Role	Ref.
2009	Boys Over Flowers	Sunny	

=== Film ===
Year	Title	Role	Ref.
2009	Searching for the Elephant	Hye-mi	
2009	The Weird Missing Case of Mr. J	Min-a	

== See also ==
- Suicide in South Korea
- List of people who died by hanging
