= Improper Solicitation and Graft Act =

2016 anti-corruption law in South Korea

The Improper Solicitation and Graft Act (Korean: 부정청탁 및 금품등 수수의 금지에 관한 법률; colloquially Kim Young-ran Act) is a 2016 anti-corruption law in South Korea. The bill is associated with Kim Young-ran, former head of the Anticorruption and Civil Rights Commission, who proposed it in August 2012, and is often referred to as the Kim Young-ran Act (or Law, or Bill). The bill has also been translated as Anti-Corruption and Bribery Prohibition Act, though "Improper Solicitation and Graft Act" is the official name. The law was passed in 2015 and started being enforced on September 28, 2016.

== Background ==
The law has been described in Financial Times as "aimed at widespread corruption" in the country. The Korea Times noted in 2014 that Korea was "still lagging behind its peers" in the OECD in terms of transparency. In Transparency International's 2014 Corruption Perceptions Index, which annually ranks countries "by their perceived levels of corruption, as determined by expert assessments and opinion surveys," South Korea was ranked 43rd (where being 1st indicates a country with the least amount of perceived corruption). This was the third-best performance among East Asian countries, behind Japan (15th) and Taiwan (35th).

The Kim Young-ran Act was not the first anti-corruption measure enacted in South Korea. The Criminal Act "already prohibited domestic public officials from receiving, demanding or promising to accept a bribe in connection with their duties, and also prohibited individuals from giving or offering to give a bribe," and the 1998 Act on Combating Bribery of Foreign Public Officials in International Business Transactions "regulates bribery related to foreign officials."

== Legislative history and legal challenges ==
The law was passed by the South Korean parliament in March 2015. The bill received bipartisan support in parliament. The law was formally promulgated by President Park Geun-hye as Act No. 13278 on March 26, 2015.

In July 2016, the Constitutional Court of Korea upheld the law, rejecting a challenge brought by the Korean Bar Association, the Journalists Association of Korea, and others, who argued that the law's provisions were unconstitutional. The challengers argued the law defines public officials too broadly by including private-school employees and journalists. The court also addressed the criticisms which suggested it would negatively affect the economy, saying "Some argued that the law will discourage economic growth, but we have seen proof in advanced countries that a country advances when corruption decreases. Based on this situation, the law does not excessively violate basic rights."

The law took effect on September 28, 2016.

== Provisions of the Act ==
The law makes it illegal for public officials (including journalists, private school teachers and their spouses) to accept gifts of more than 50,000 won (about 45 USD) or 100,000 won (about 90 USD) at closed events such as weddings and funerals; it also limits dinner expenditures to 30,000 won (about 27 USD) per person. In addition, the law also prohibits fifteen categories of "improper solicitations to public officials"; such solicitations are prohibited even if not accompanied by a 'payment, offer, or promise to pay or provide, money or a thing of value." The legislation also includes "seven categories of requests to which the Act does not apply." These exceptions have been criticized as vague.

== Impact ==
The law clashed with Korean traditions, such as that the most senior person at a social gathering should pay the entire bill. Another controversy surrounds traditional gift baskets during holidays such as Chuseok, which usually are priced at 70–80,000 won. Both of those customs are made illegal by the law.

Some Korean lobby groups like Federation of Korean Industries (ko) have opposed the law, arguing that it could cause economic losses for Korean economy, negatively affecting spending in some industry sectors, like in the restaurants business.

Since the law came into force, many Korean officials reported that they are cancelling dinners and splitting bills at cheaper cafeterias, which have seen increased number of customers. On the other hand, higher-end restaurants, flower shops, golf courses, and chauffeur services at business and government districts reported a decline in business. Some officials also reported that they can return home earlier, spending more time with their families, as the number of work-related gatherings, often lasting until late hours, have been sharply curtailed.

A survey conducted by Gallup Korea in early October 2016 showed that the law is supported by 71% of Koreans.

== See also ==
- Anti-Corruption and Civil Rights Commission
