= Harold Pupkewitz =

Namibian businessman

- Born: 14 July 1915; Vilno, Russian Empire (present Lithuania)
- Died: 27 April 2012 (aged 96); Windhoek, Namibia
- Occupation: Entrepreneur
- Years active: 1937–2012
- Spouse: Ethel née Meyerovitz
- Children: 2

Harold Pupkewitz (14 July 1915 – 27 April 2012) was a Lithuanian-born, Namibian entrepreneur and member of the President's Economic Advisory Council. He was the Executive Chairman of Pupkewitz Holdings, a group of builders' merchants, car sale businesses, and a host of other enterprises, from its foundation in 1946 until his death. Pupkewitz directed the boards of several important Namibian companies, among them NamPost, NamPower, Telecom Namibia, and MTC Namibia, and served as president of a number of high-profile political and economical institutions.

== Early life and education ==
Harold Pupkewitz was born in Vilno, Russian Empire (now known as Vilnius, the capital of Lithuania), on 14 July 1915. He moved to South West Africa in 1925 together with his mother Anna and his two brothers, Morris and Julius. After completing secondary school at Windhoek High School in 1932 he went to Cape Town for further studies. He graduated from University of Cape Town in 1935 with a Bachelor of Commerce and stayed to work in Cape Town for two more years. While on a holiday in Windhoek in 1937 he decided to join the management of the family business, which at that time had developed from an ox wagon manufacturing enterprise to that of a general dealer, selling household wares and groceries. Pupkewitz has thus managed the Pupkewitz group of companies for 75 years, from 1937 to 2012.

== Development of the family business ==
The Pupkewitz family business was founded by Harold's father Max in 1902 as an ox wagon building and repair enterprise. In 1904 at the onset of the Herero and Namaqua War he opened shop in Okahandja, strategically situated between Windhoek and the coastal towns of Walvis Bay and Swakopmund. Max Pupkewitz travelled to Europe in 1912, was jailed for his support of the German colonialists, and only returned in 1920. At that time, railways had been constructed and the era of ox wagon transportation in South West Africa was over. Max Pupkewitz opened a general dealer business in Windhoek in 1925, the year the rest of the family resettled here.

In July 1946, Harold Pupkewitz co-founded M Pupkewitz and Sons. The portfolio at first mainly consisted of building material and farm supplies but was expanded in 1954 with the addition of a furniture shop and a motor car sale business.

When Volvo suspended their engagement in Southern Africa because of concerns about the apartheid system, Pupkewitz bought the local Toyota business in 1975. Later Hino trucks and the Nissan franchise were added. In 2002 the car sales branch had grown to be the largest in Namibia. Apart from Windhoek, the Pupkewitz group has outlets in many other places in Namibia, among them Walvis Bay, Keetmanshoop, Grootfontein, Otjiwarongo, Gobabis, and Aranos. In 1981, Pupkewitz Holdings was founded as umbrella organisation for the different companies. In 2005 this group of companies, which is a well-known brand in Namibia, employed 848 people nationally.

== Service in other institutions ==
Pupkewitz served on the boards of different companies and organisations for much of his life. Before Namibian independence he was member of the Foreign Exchange Liaison Committee (1948–1954), the Administrator-General's Advisory Council (1979–1990), president of the Chamber of Commerce and Industries of South West Africa (1981/82), the Institute of Economic Affairs of South West Africa, the South African Institute of International Affairs (1982–1990), and director of Namib Air and Namib Airlines (the predecessor of Air Namibia).

In Namibia he served as director on the boards of NamPost (1992–2000), City Savings and Investment Bank (1994–2002), MTC Namibia (1996–2000), Telecom Namibia (1992–2007), chairman of NamPower (1996–2000), and president of the Namibia Employers' Federation (1998–2007). He was a member of the President's Economic Advisory Council since 1997.

== Awards and recognition ==
Pupkewitz was one of the leading entrepreneurs of Namibia. He received a number of awards for his contributions towards the country's business development:

- 2001: Professional Management Review’s (PMR) Diamond Arrow Award
- 2003: PMR Business Achiever of the Year for Namibia
- 2004: Laureate of the Namibian Business Hall of Fame

Polytechnic of Namibia named its postgraduate branch of business management Harold Pupkewitz Graduate School of Business after Pupkewitz made a 10 million N$ donation towards the School's development. In 2011 the institution awarded him a Doctorate honoris causa in Business Management for his contribution towards business development in Namibia.

== Family and private life ==
Harold Pupkewitz married Ethel née Meyerovitz in 1952. They had two children. He was a workaholic until advanced age. In 2011, at the age of 95, he still worked full-time six days a week as Executive Chairman of Pupkewitz Holdings.

Apart from his activities in the family business, Pupkewitz was farming on farm Us on the banks of Kuiseb River from 1946 to 1985. He was an active rugby player, horse rider, and horse trainer between 1942 and 1962 and has won several trophies.

Pupkewitz was a member of Windhoek's small Jewish community, the Windhoek Hebrew Congregation, and attended its shul for almost its entire time of existence. He was the congregation's honorary vice-president. He also served as vice-chairman of the African Jewish Congress and actively fought antisemitism. Pupkewitz was a supporter of the State of Israel.

Pupkewitz died in Windhoek on 27 April 2012 from a heart attack.
