= Telecommunications in Namibia =

Telecommunications in Namibia include radio, television, fixed and mobile telephones, and the Internet.

== Radio and television ==
Per 1,000 inhabitants, there were 50 TV sets and 137 radio sets in Namibia in 2008.

- Radio stations:
  - State-run radio service broadcasts in multiple languages; about a dozen private radio stations; transmissions of multiple international broadcasters are available (2007);
  - AM 2, FM 39, shortwave 4 (2001);
  - AM 2, FM 34, shortwave 5 (1998).

Since Independence in 1990, Namibia has seen a dramatic growth in the number of radio stations, with both commercial (for instance Radio 99, Radio Wave, Radio Energy, Omulunga Radio, West Coast FM, etc.) and community (UNAM Radio, Katutura Community Radio, etc.) receiving licences. Most of these stations broadcast various types of music format, and political discussions, news and phone-in programs remain largely the domain of the national broadcaster (NBC) which broadcasts nine radio services nationally (in various Namibian languages, including German - the only full-time German service outside of Europe), plus the new !Ha service, broadcasting to the San community in Tsumkwe.

- Television stations: 1 private and 1 state-run TV station; satellite and cable TV service is available; transmissions of multiple international broadcasters are available (2007).

The television network with the widest transmission range is the Namibian Broadcasting Corporation (NBC, not to be confused with the American NBC network). The NBC is the successor to the South Africa–run South West African Broadcasting Corporation (SWABC), which was modeled on the original SABC. Like the radio services of the NBC, the television service tries to cater to all the linguistic audiences in Namibia, although the dominant language is English (Namibia's official language).

The commercial "free to air" station is One Africa Television, the successor to the now defunct TVAfrica. It has expanded its transmitter network and is now available in most major towns and cities in Namibia. In 2007 it commenced broadcasting a local television news bulletin each evening.

The Trinity Broadcasting Network (TBN) is a religion television station, TBN Namibia, with some material originating locally, although also carrying relays from the United States. It is based in Windhoek and holds a community television licence granted in 2001.

== Telephones ==
- Calling code: +264
- International call prefix: 00
- Main lines in use:
  - 144,575 lines, 126th in the world (2019);
  - 171,000 lines (2012);
  - 140,000 lines (2008);
  - 127,900 lines (2004);
  - 110,200 lines (2000);
  - 100,848 lines (1997).
- Mobile cellular:
  - 2.92 million lines, 142nd in the world (2019);
  - 2.4 million lines (2012);
  - 1.1 million lines (2008);
  - 450,000 lines (2006);
  - 495,000 lines (2005);
  - 82,000 lines (2000 estimate);
  - 20,000 lines (1998).
- Telephone system: good system; core fiber-optic network links most centers and connections are now digital; multiple mobile-cellular providers with a combined subscribership of more than 100 telephones per 100 persons; fiber-optic cable to South Africa, microwave radio relay link to Botswana, direct links to other neighboring countries (2010).
- Communications cables: connected to the African Coast to Europe (ACE) and the West Africa Cable System (WACS) submarine cables, as well as the South African Far East (SAFE) submarine cable through South Africa (2010).
- Satellite earth stations: 4 Intelsat (2010).

== Internet ==
- Top-level domain: .na
- Internet users: 1,291,944 users, 134th in the world; 51% of the population (2019).
- Fixed broadband: 61,698 subscriptions, 131st in the world (2019).
- Wireless broadband: 624,257 subscriptions, 86th in the world; 28.8% of the population, 56th in the world (2012).
- Internet hosts: 78,280 hosts, 84th in the world (2012).
- IPv4: 199,168 addresses allocated, less than 0.05% of the world total, 92.0 addresses per 1000 people (2012).

Telecom Namibia, which has offered ADSL access since late 2006, has a de facto monopoly on ADSL access. Their monopoly was unsuccessfully challenged in the courts by MWeb Namibia in May 2007 and again in August 2011.

In February 2007, ISP Namibia Mweb began offering broadband wireless services through WiMax, making Namibia the second African country (after Mozambique) to do so.

=== Internet censorship and surveillance ===
There are no government restrictions on access to the Internet; however, the Communications Act provides that the intelligence services can monitor e-mail and Internet usage with authorization from any magistrate. There have been some allegations and rumors that the government reviewed ways to block or curtail social media sites, but there is no concrete evidence of such action.

The constitution provides for freedom of speech and of the press, and the government generally respects these rights.

== See also ==
- Mobile Telecommunications Limited Namibia (MTC-Namibia), a mobile phone company 66% of which is owned by Namibia Post and Telecom Holdings Limited which is intern wholly owned by the Namibian Government.
- TN Mobile, a mobile telecommunications company 100% owned by Telecom Namibia which is owned by Namibia Post and Telecom Holdings Limited which is intern wholly owned by the Namibian Government.
- Telecom Namibia, a commercialized subsidiary of Namibia Post and Telecom Holdings Limited which is intern wholly owned by the Namibian Government.
- Media of Namibia
- List of terrestrial fibre optic cable projects in Africa
- Digitalization in Namibia
