= PowerCom =

Telecommunications infrastructure provider and subsidiary of Telecom Namibia

PowerCom (Pty) Ltd
- Industry: Telecommunications infrastructure
- Founded: 2007
- Headquarters: Windhoek, Namibia
- Key people: Mr. Beatus Amadhila (Chief Executive Officer)
- Parent: Telecom Namibia
- Website: www.powercom.na

PowerCom (Pty) Ltd, commonly known as PowerCom, is a Namibian telecommunications infrastructure provider and a wholly owned subsidiary of Telecom Namibia. Originally established in 2007 as Namibia's second mobile operator under the brand Cell One, the company was later rebranded as Leo before being acquired by Telecom Namibia in 2013. Since then, PowerCom has operated as Telecom Namibia's infrastructure subsidiary, holding a Class Network Facilities Licence issued by the Communications Regulatory Authority of Namibia (CRAN) under the Communications Act (No. 8 of 2009).

The company focuses on constructing, managing, and leasing telecommunications towers and related infrastructure across Namibia.

== History ==
PowerCom was founded in 2007 when the Namibian government licensed the company, under the brand name Cell One, as the country's second mobile operator in an effort to introduce competition to the monopoly held by Mobile Telecommunications Company (MTC).

Cell One launched with aggressive pricing strategies and invested in its own mobile network infrastructure. However, the company struggled financially to compete against the entrenched MTC, which had a much larger customer base and national coverage.

In 2009, Cell One was acquired by Egyptian-owned Telecel Globe, a subsidiary of Orascom Telecom, and subsequently rebranded as Leo. Despite significant investment, Leo failed to achieve long-term commercial viability.

On 2 March 2012, Telecom Namibia entered into a Sale of Shares Agreement with Guinea Fowl Investments Two (Pty) Ltd, PowerCom (Pty) Ltd, Investec Bank Ltd, and Nedbank Ltd to acquire PowerCom t/a Leo. The transaction was approved by the Communications Regulatory Authority of Namibia (CRAN) on 11 October 2012 and by the Namibia Competition Commission on 27 April 2012. The acquisition was finalized on 29 November 2012, with Telecom Namibia purchasing 100% of PowerCom's equity interest for a nominal N$2.00, while assuming Leo's debt obligations of approximately N$180 million.

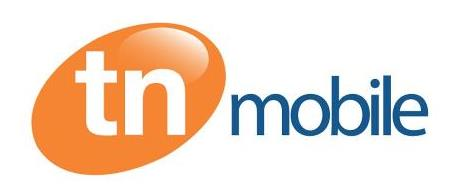
tn mobile, first introduced as Cell One in 2007 and later renamed Leo in 2009, is the mobile telecommunications division of Telecom Namibia. In 2012, the Communications Regulatory Authority of Namibia (CRAN) approved the takeover of Leo by Telecom Namibia. The brand was re-launched in 2013 as tn mobile (Telecom Namibia Mobile).

Following the acquisition, Leo's mobile operations were merged into Telecom Namibia's mobile division, later branded as tn mobile. The PowerCom entity itself was retained and repurposed as Telecom Namibia's infrastructure subsidiary. Since 2013, PowerCom has focused on building and leasing telecommunications towers, repositioning itself as a key provider of ICT infrastructure solutions.

== Services ==
PowerCom provides a range of infrastructure services to mobile operators, broadcasters, and other ICT providers:

- Tower space leasing – leasing space on PowerCom towers to mobile, broadcasting, and transmission operators on medium- to long-term agreements.
- Managed services (rooftops) – hosting equipment on rooftops of strategic urban buildings in partnership with property owners.
- Third-party co-location – enabling ICT equipment installation on alternative elevated structures, such as municipal water towers and utility infrastructure.

== See also ==
- Telecommunications in Namibia
- Telecom Namibia
- MTC Namibia
- Paratus Namibia
