= Treaty Oak =

Treaty Oak may refer to:

- Treaty Oak (Austin, Texas), extant
- Treaty Oak (Jacksonville), in Florida, extant
- Treaty Oak (New York City), toppled in a storm in March 1909
- Treaty Oak (Washington, D.C.), felled in 1953
- Treaty Oak Revival, an American country music band based in Odessa, Texas

== See also ==
- Treaty Tree, in Cape Town, South Africa
- Old Treaty Elm, in Chicago, Illinois, stood until 1934
