= Digitalization in Namibia =

Digitalization in Namibia is the process of digital transformation and the adoption of digital technologies in Namibia. As of 2023, this movement has been characterized by the rapid increase in internet penetration, the development of digital infrastructure, the proliferation of digital services, and the implementation of digital literacy programs.

== History ==
As of 1998, a report states that only 0.7% of the population had access to the Internet in Namibia. A governmental conference held in Windhoek in 2009 concluded limited internet access, lack of technological infrastructure, low digital literacy, and regulatory challenges as key barriers towards economic transformation which hence was seen primarily through digitalization. The first notable step towards digitalization in Namibia was the liberalization of the telecommunications sector in 2006, leading to the emergence of multiple ISPs and mobile network operators.

Namibia launched 4G and 5G spectrum auctions in early 2023.

== Digital infrastructure ==
In 2021 it was reported, 1.31 million out of 2.56 million of Namibian population were connected to the Internet. Since then, Namibian underwent internet connectivity and mobile phones usage expansion, primarily by the government and major telecom companies, such as Telecom Namibia and Mobile Telecommunications Limited (MTC).

== Government initiatives ==
The Namibian government has been proactive in driving digital transformation in the country. Its National ICT Policy, introduced in 2016, aimed to harness information and communication technologies to foster economic growth and social development. Furthermore, in 2021, the government unveiled the Digital Namibia Strategy, which outlined a comprehensive plan to enhance digital literacy, cybersecurity, e-governance, and data-driven decision-making, among other areas.
