= Mzansi Account =

The Mzansi Account is a low income transactional banking account that was developed in line with the commitments of South Africa's Financial Sector Charter. The Financial Sector Charter requires banks to make banking more accessible to the nation and, specifically, to increase banking reach to all communities.

The Mzansi Account is the result of the major South African banks working collectively to provide a standard for new bank accounts, which is affordable, readily available and suits the specific needs of the previously unbanked communities. Each bank has established its own pricing competitively.

The collaboration between the banks has allowed Mzansi account holders to make use of any of the participating banks’ ATMs at no additional cost – effectively creating a network of over ten thousand ATMs across the country and extending the banking platform to the greater community. This is augmented by point of sale functionality available at retailers.

The Mzansi Account is issued by the following South African banks:

- Absa Group Limited
- FNB
- Nedcor
- Standard Bank
- Postbank

By August 2006 3.3 million Mzansi Accounts had been opened across the 5 issuing banks.
