= Mzansi (disambiguation) =

Mzansi is a colloquial name for South Africa derived from the Xhosa noun uMzantzi meaning "South".

Mzansi may also refer to:

- Rise Mzansi, a South African political party
- Mzansi Magic, a South African digital satellite and entertainment channel
- Mzansi Super League, a former Twenty20 Cricket franchise league held in South Africa
- Mzansi Account, a South African low-income transactional banking account
