= Ramat HaKovesh =

Kibbutz in central Israel

Ramat HaKovesh: רָמַת הַכּוֹבֵשׁ (Hebrew)
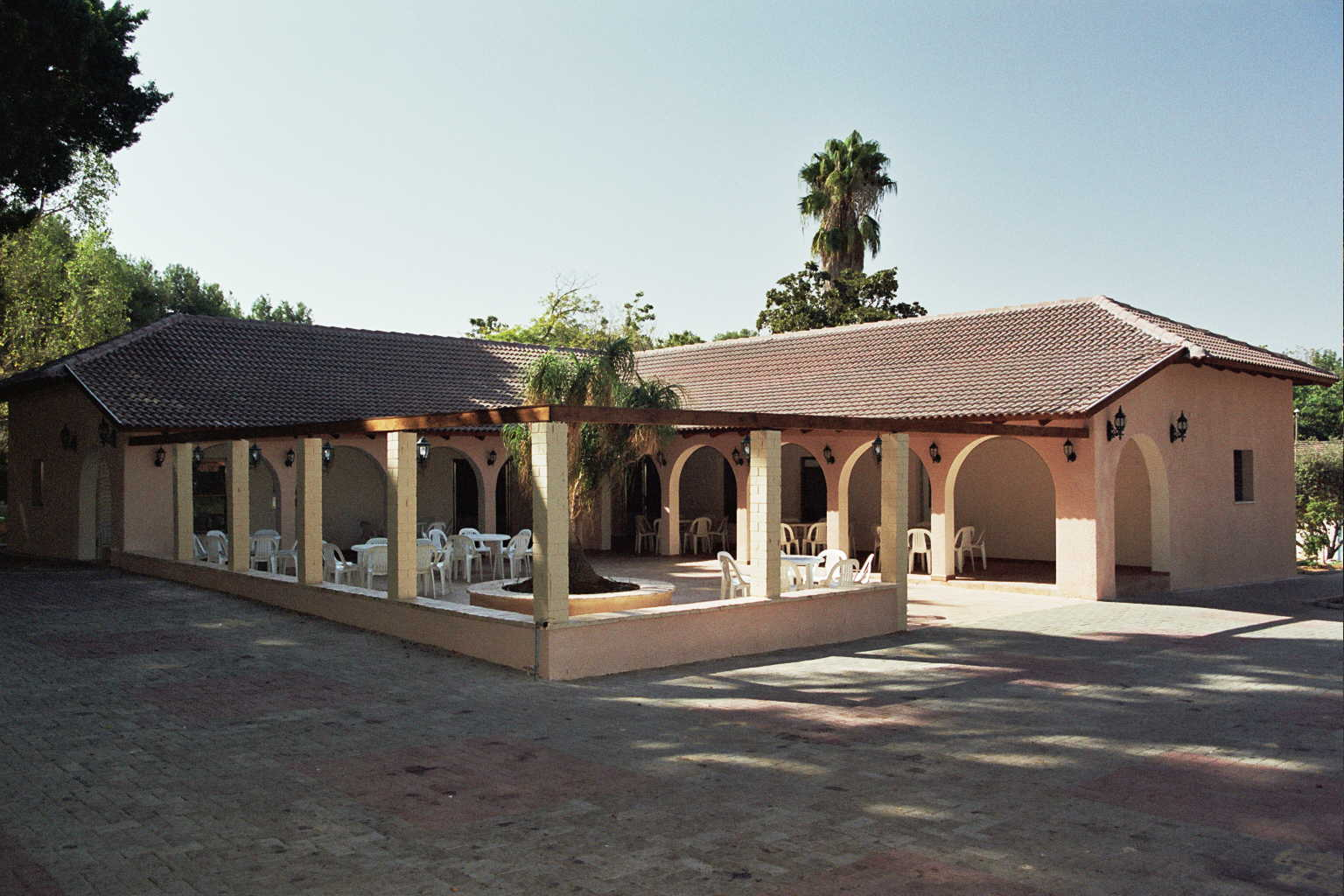

- Location within Central Israel
- Coordinates: 32°13′3″N 34°56′17″E
- Country: Israel
- District: Central
- Subdistrict: Petah Tikva
- Council: Drom HaSharon
- Affiliation: Kibbutz Movement
- Founded: August 1932
- Founder: Hashomer Hatzair-HeHalutz members
- Population (2024): 1,246

Ramat HaKovesh (Hebrew: רָמַת הַכּוֹבֵשׁ, lit. 'The conqueror's Ridge') is a kibbutz in central Israel. Approximately 7 kilometers northeast of Kfar Saba and south-west of Tira. The kibbutz falls under the jurisdiction of Drom HaSharon Regional Council. In 2024 it had a population of 1,246.

== Etymology ==
Ramat Hakovesh was named for "Hakovesh," the Jewish pioneering group that established the kibbutz, reflecting the Labor Zionist ideal of manual labor and the agricultural "conquest" of barren land.

== History ==
Before the 20th century the area formed part of the Forest of Sharon. It was an open woodland dominated by Mount Tabor Oak, which extended from Kfar Yona in the north to Ra'anana in the south. The local Arabs used the area for pasture, firewood and intermittent cultivation. The intensification of settlement and agriculture in the coastal plain during the 19th century led to deforestation and subsequent environmental degradation.

The kibbutz was founded by Zionist youth from the Hashomer Hatzair and HeHalutz movements, including Jews from Wizna. A Vishnivean group of the HeHalutz movement immigrated to Mandate Palestine in 1926. They formed the nucleus of kibbutz "HaKovesh", which initially camped near Petah Tikva. In 1936, they moved to a parcel of land purchased from an Arab family where they engaged in farming despite years of ongoing sniping and violence.

On 16 November 1943 the British military searched the kibbutz for arms on the pretext of searching for deserters from the Polish Army, which was then stationed in Palestine.In the violent confrontation, a kibbutz member, Shmuel Wolynetz, was killed, 14 people were wounded, and 35 were arrested

In November 1945, following the Night of the Trains, a Palestine Police squad with dogs tried to break into the kibbutz. Upon orders from Jerusalem to withdraw, it was declared off-limits to British forces.

== Economy ==
The kibbutz owns and operates Duram Rubber Products Company, a manufacturer of technical rubber products. Duram Mask A.C. Ltd., a subsidiary. manufactures the Duram Escape Mask, special emergency escape masks for personal use in situations of smoke, fire, chemical spill or chemical/biological terror attack.

Kibbutz Ramat Hakovesh operates a wedding and banquet hall, Pekan Garden.

PowerCom, a company based in Ramat Hakovesh, produces a remote monitoring system that collects data from solar systems and sends information to an online server that can be accessed from computers anywhere in the world.

== Notable people ==
- Sara Levi-Tanai (1910–2005), choreographer and song writer. Lived in the Kibbutz from 1940 to 1945.

== Gallery ==
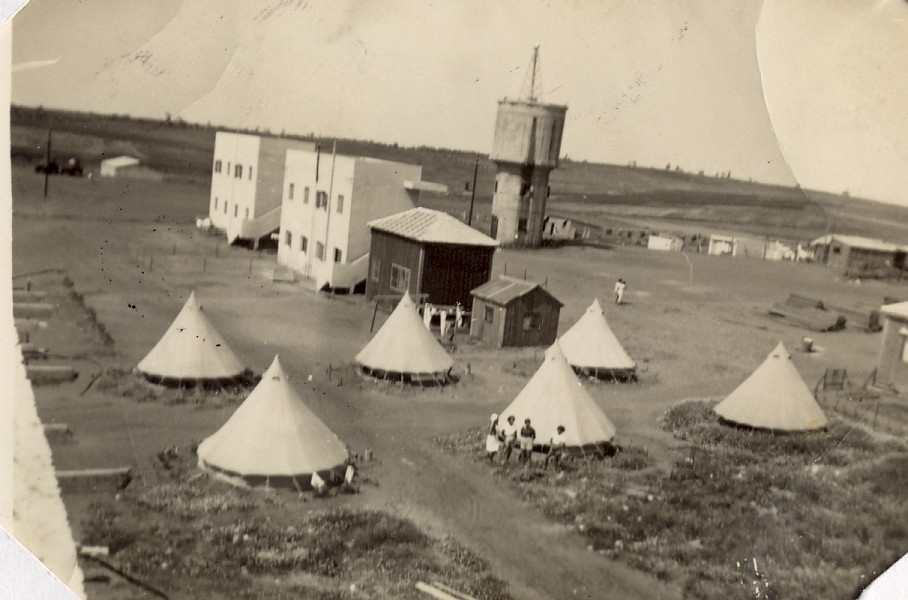
Tent camp, circa 1933

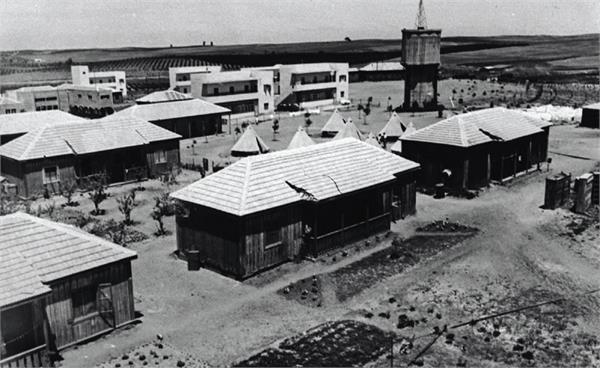
Ramat HaKovesh 1937

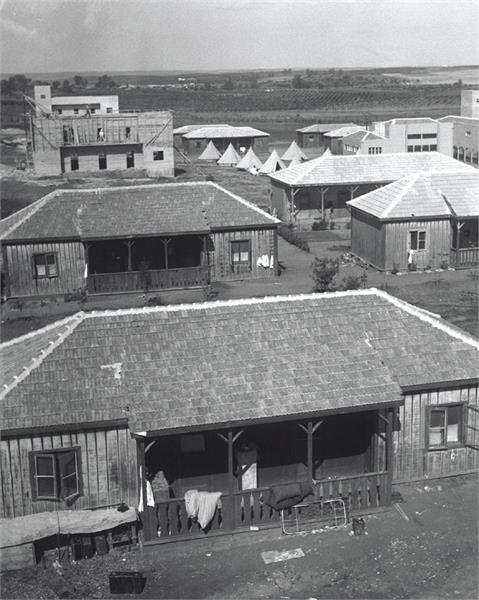
Ramat HaKovesh 1937

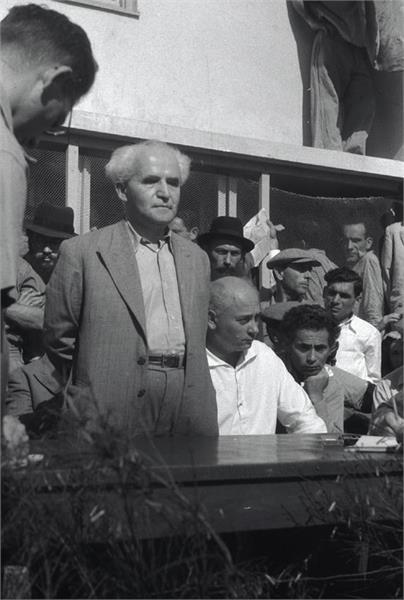
Ramat HaKovesh Ben Gurion speaking a protest 1943
