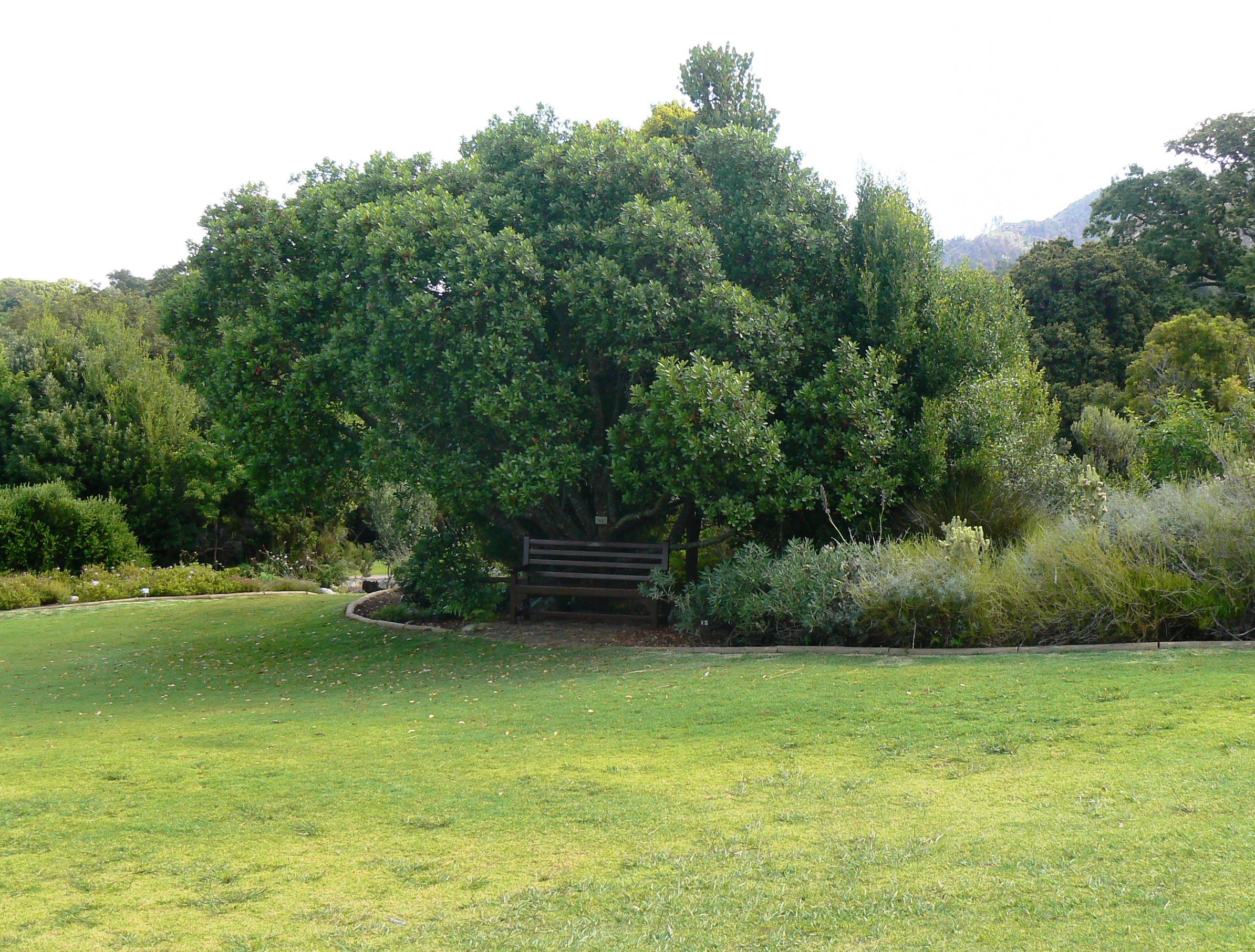

Scientific classification
- Kingdom: Plantae
- Clade: Tracheophytes
- Clade: Angiosperms
- Clade: Eudicots
- Clade: Asterids
- Order: Ericales
- Family: Sapotaceae
- Genus: Sideroxylon
- Species: S. inerme

Binomial name
- Sideroxylon inerme L. (1753)

Synonyms
- Roemeria inermis (L.) Thunb. (1798); Calvaria inermis (L.) Dubard (1912)

= Sideroxylon inerme =

Species of tree

Sideroxylon inerme (aMasethole or white milkwood, Afrikaans: wit-melkhout, Xhosa: Ximafana, Zulu: Umakhwelafingqane) is a southern and eastern African coastal tree, with dense foliage, black berries and small, foetid, greenish flowers. The tree's generic name means "Iron-wood" in Greek, referring to its very hard timber.

It is one of South Africa's "Protected Trees" and several specimens are provincial heritage sites. This is the only member of the genus Sideroxylon in Southern Africa.

== Distribution ==
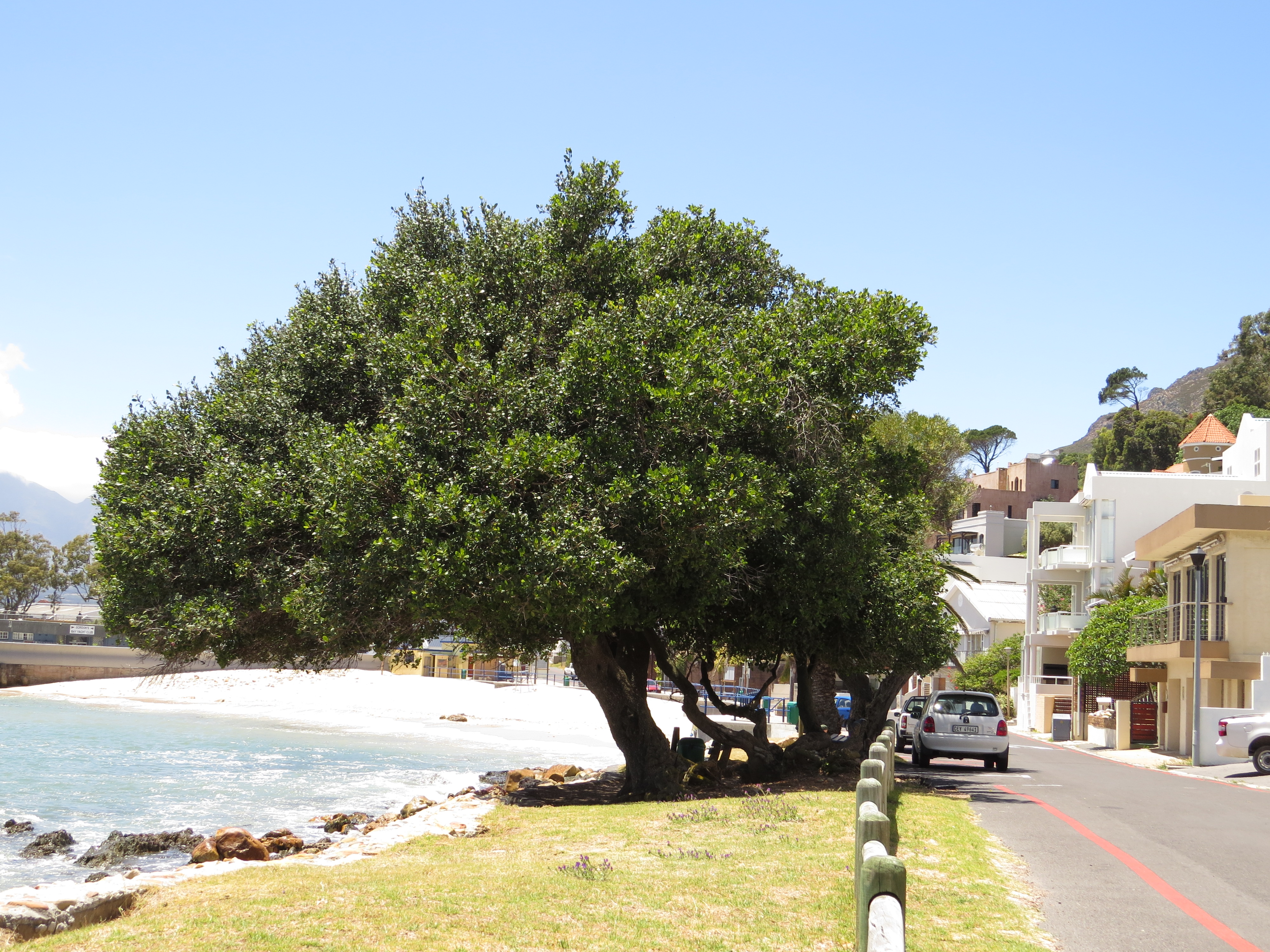
Cape milkwood trees in typical coastal habitat

Sideroxylon inerme trees are scattered through the coastal woodlands and littoral forests of southern and eastern Africa, from the Cape Provinces of South Africa in the south to Somalia in the north, and on Aldabra, the Comoro Islands, and the Mozambique Channel Islands in the western Indian Ocean. Historically, dense forests of large milkwood trees used to exist along the coast and bays of Cape Town, especially at Noordhoek, Macassar and Gordons Bay. The milkwood is not endangered but it is one of South Africa's Protected Trees, which means that it is illegal to damage, move or destroy them.

== Description ==
Sideroxylon inerme is a semi-coastal sturdy broadleaf evergreen tree with dense foliage, displays of white bisexual flowers and edible purplish-black berries. It boasts leathery, spiral leaves, which, like the berries, contain milky latex. Young branches and new leaves are always covered with fine hairs. The tree can reach 15 m.

The milkwood has considerable value in traditional medicine and attracts birds, monkeys and other animals to its flowers and fruits : Speckled mousebirds eat the flowers; birds, bats, monkeys and bush pigs eat the fruit. It is also an effective firebreak and is cultivated for that purpose.

== Subspecies ==
Sideroxylon inerme includes three subspecies:

- Sideroxylon inerme subsp. cryptophlebium (Baker) J.H.Hemsl., which grows on Aldabra island (Seychelles);
- Sideroxylon inerme subsp. diospyroides (Baker) J.H.Hemsl., whose range extends to Somalia, Kenya, Tanzania, Zimbabwe and Mozambique;
- Sideroxylon inerme subsp. inerme, in Mozambique and South Africa.

== Historical aspects ==
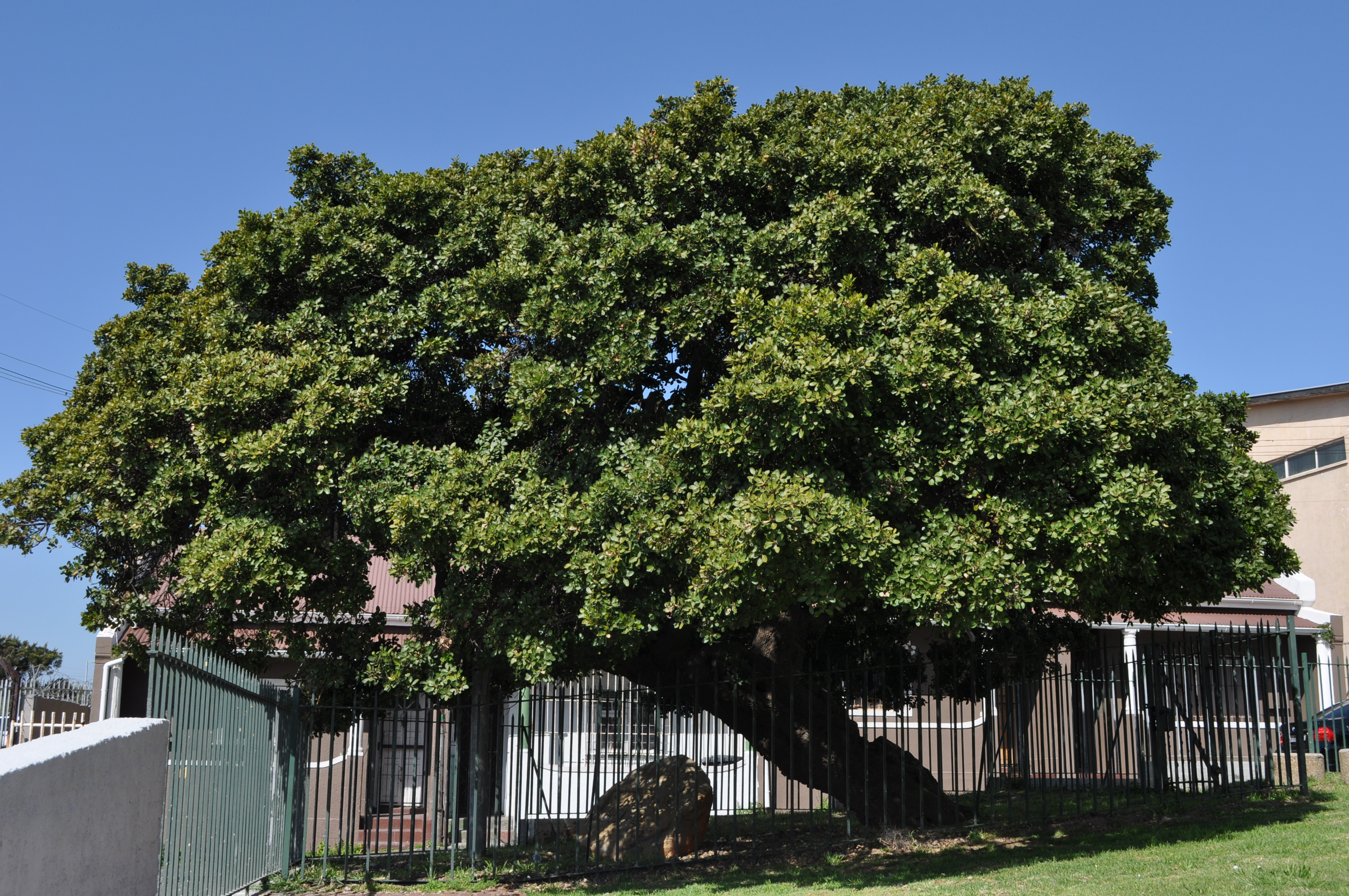
The "Treaty Tree" in Woodstock, Cape Town.

The white milkwood has great significance in South Africa's heritage, with three specimens proclaimed as provincial heritage sites:

- The Post Office Tree in Mossel Bay is believed to be 600 years old. The Post Office tree, which still stands about 1000 feet from Santos Beach, is considered the first (unofficial) post office in South Africa. It was declared a provincial heritage site in 1938 and is marked with a plaque reading: “This post office tree stands near the fountains where the Portuguese navigators regularly drew water at Aguada de São Bras (now Mossel Bay) from 1488 onwards. In May 1500 Pêro de Ataíde, captain of a homeward-bound ship of Pedro Cabral’s fleet, left a message here which was found on 7 July 1507 by the outward bound ships of João da Nova. According to tradition the message was placed in an old shoe and tied to a tree”. The seven-year-old letter described the loss at sea of four ships from the expedition of Bartolomeu Dias, and warned of hostilities encountered on the Indian coast. In 1962 SAPO, the South African postal service, erected a mailbox at the tree in the shape of a shoe, and items posted from there are cancelled with a special stamp.
- The Treaty Tree in Woodstock, Cape Town stood next to the house where in 1806 the Batavian Republic (the modern Netherlands) surrendered Cape Town to the British.
- The Fingo Milkwood in the Eastern Cape was the location where in 1835 the Fengu people signed a treaty of alliance with the Cape Colony.
- The Grandfather of Still Bay is estimated to be about 1000 years old. It was entered into the register of Champion Trees.

== Gallery ==
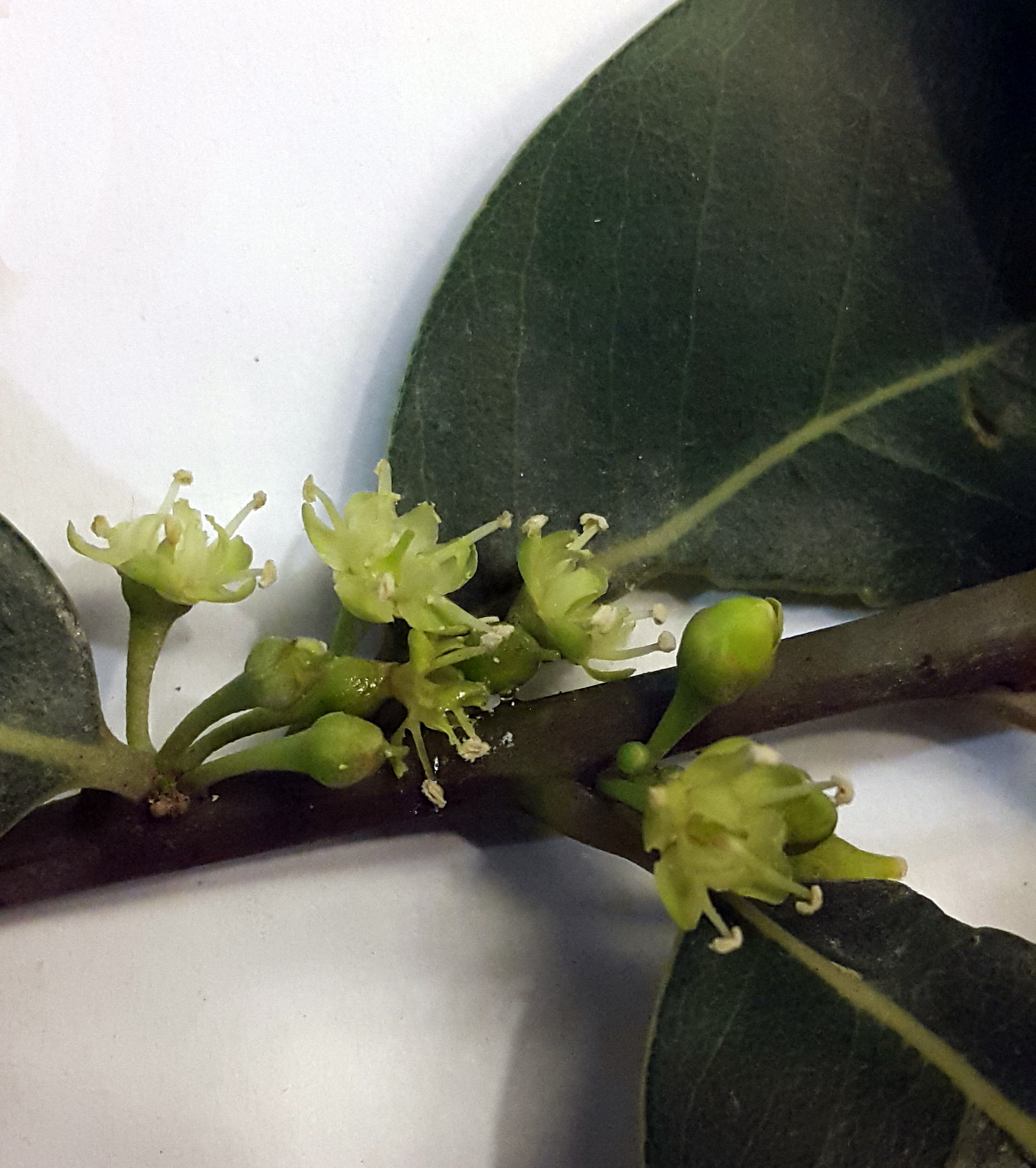
Detail of flowers

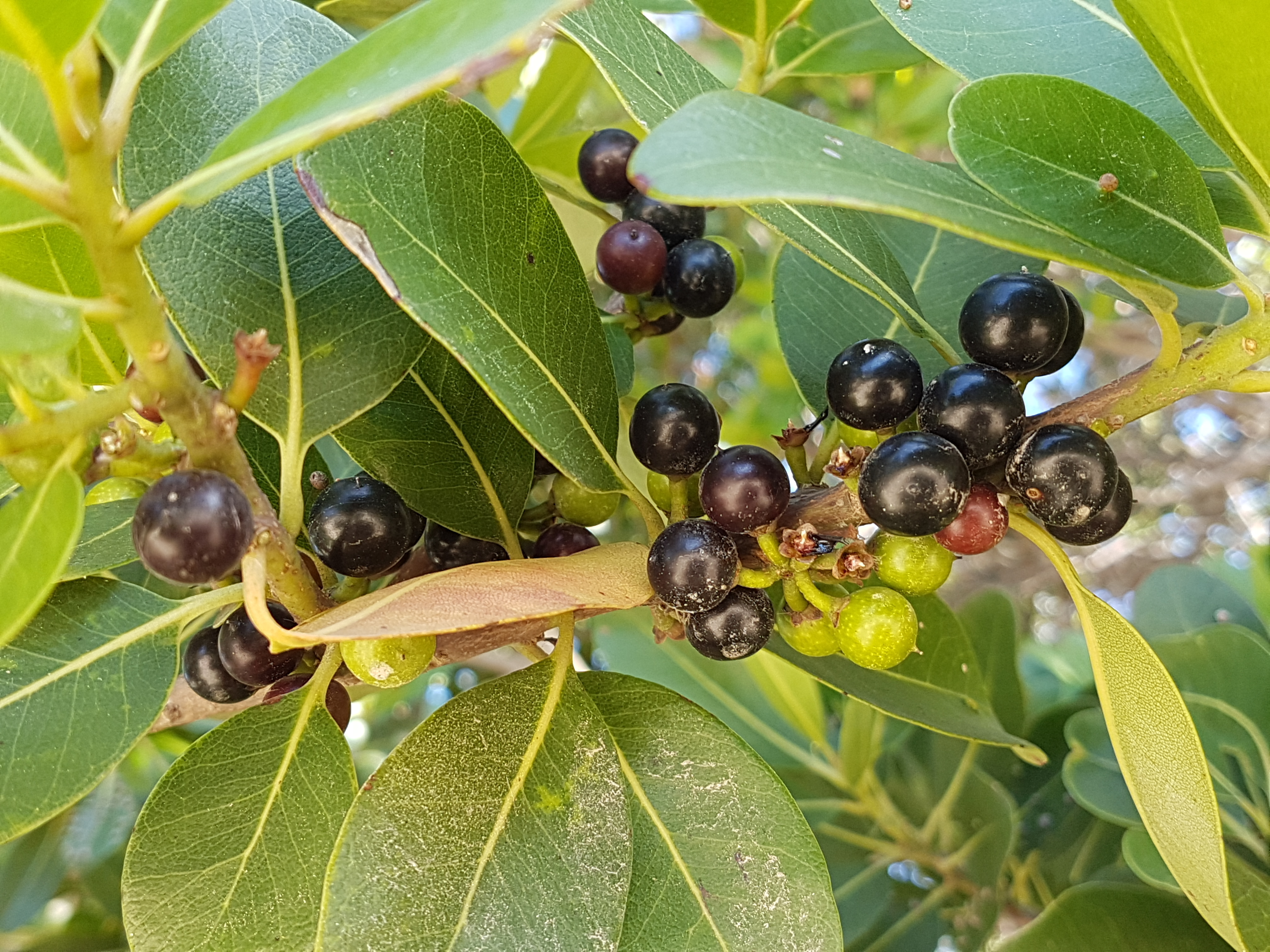
Detail of the fruit.

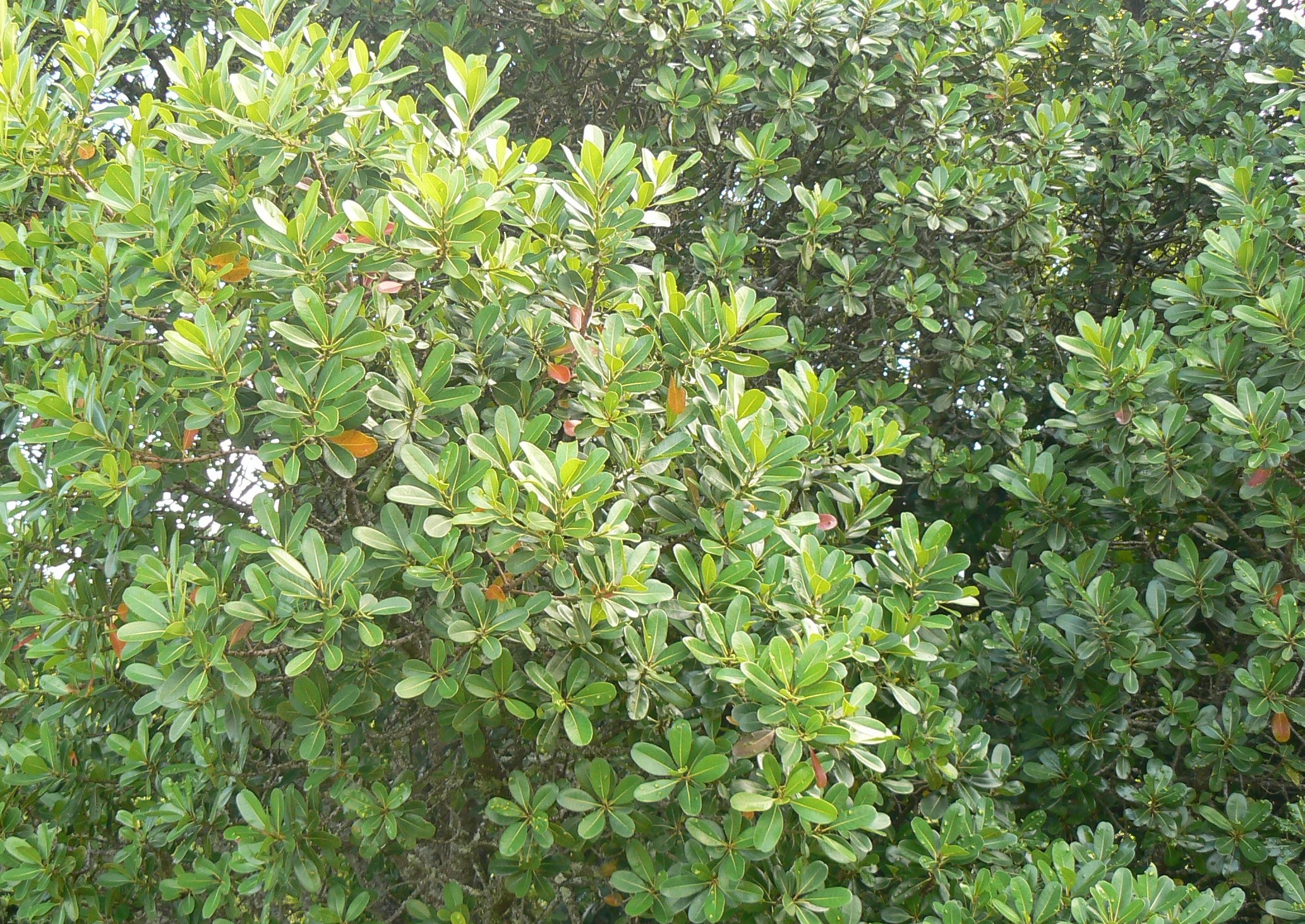
Detail of the foliage.

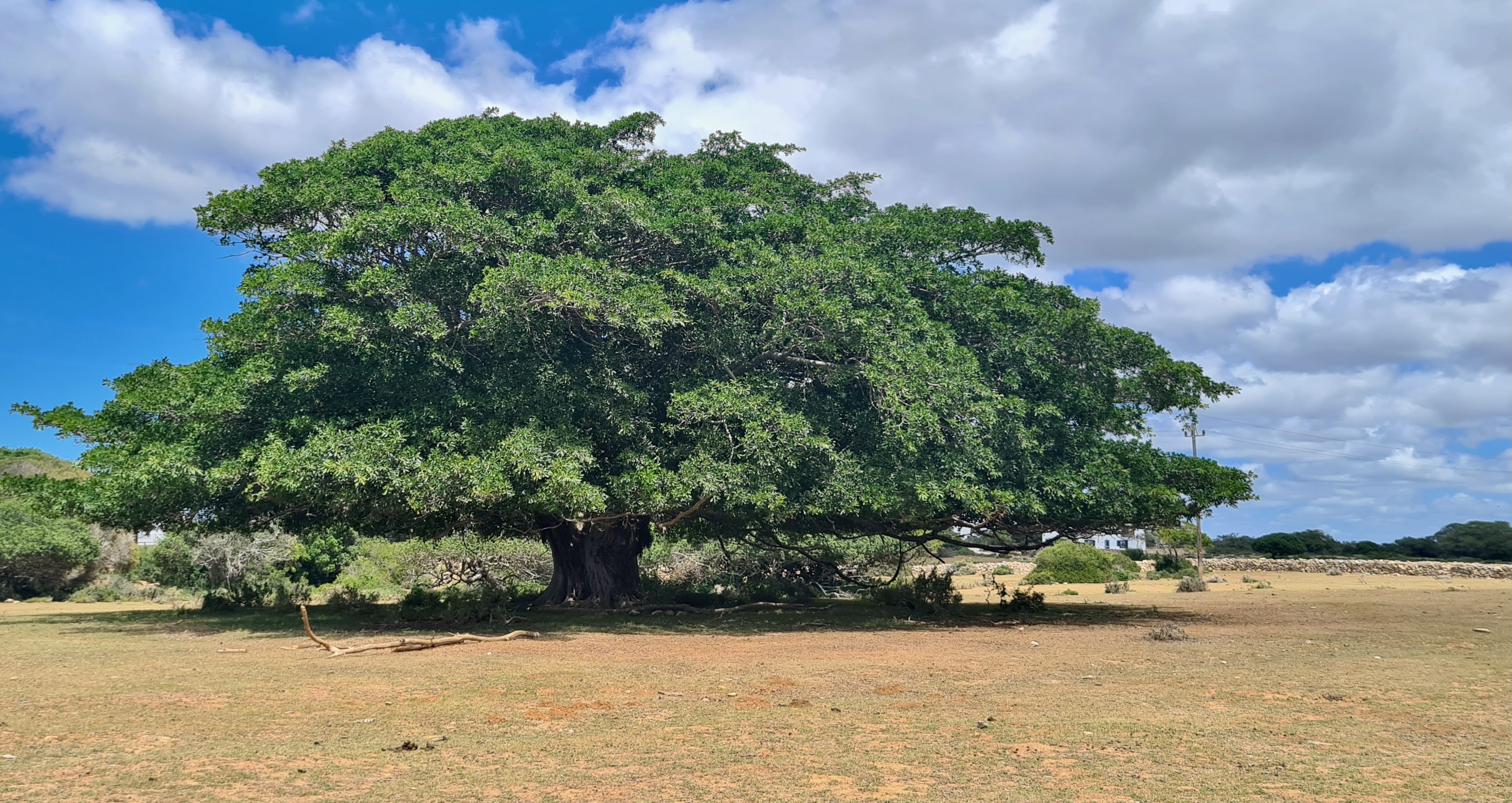
S. inerme at De Hoop Nature Reserve

== See also ==
- List of Southern African indigenous trees
- Post Office Tree
- Treaty Tree
