= South African Post Office =

National postal service of South Africa

South African Post Office SOC Ltd

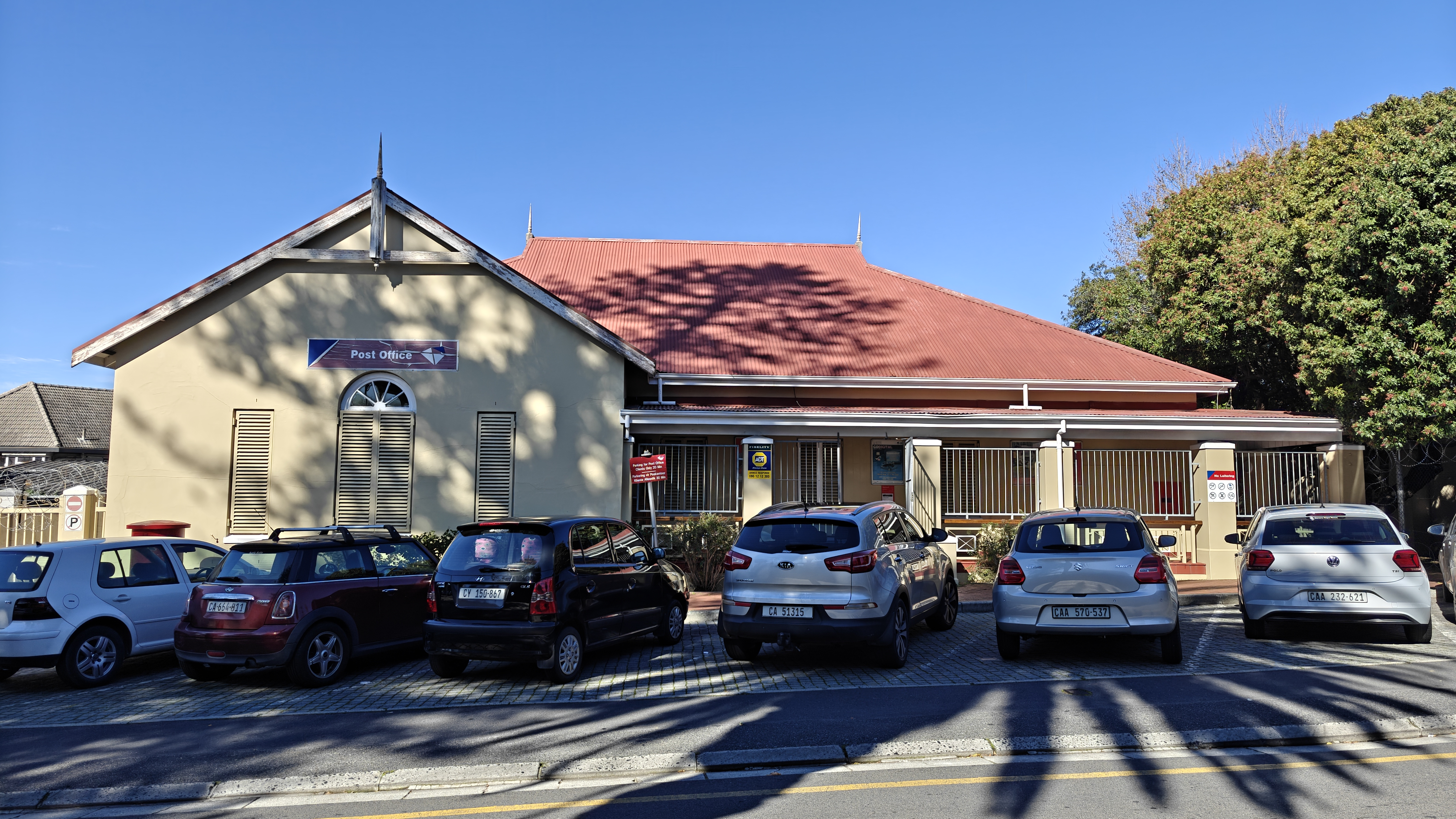
- Kenilworth Post Office, in Cape Town
- Type: State owned company
- Industry: Postal services, courier, banking
- Founded: 1792; 234 years ago
- Headquarters: National Postal Centre in Pretoria, South Africa
- Area served: Worldwide
- Key people: Ms Fathima Gany (acting Group Executive Officer)
- Services: Letter post, parcel service
- Revenue: ▼ R4.5 billion (FY2018)
- Net income: ▲ R(908) million (FY2018)
- Total assets: ▲ R13.5 billion (FY2018)
- Number of employees: ▼18,119 (FY2018)
- Subsidiaries: Speed Services Couriers
- Website: postoffice.co.za

The South African Post Office (often referred to as SA Post Office, or simply SAPO) is the national postal service of South Africa. As a state owned enterprise, its only shareholder is the South African government. With the institution that eventually became the Post Office having opened in 1792, SAPO is the oldest institution in South Africa.

In terms of South African law, the Post Office is the only entity that is legally allowed to accept reserved mail, and as such, it operates a monopoly. It employs over 16,480 people and operates more than 1,400 postal outlets throughout the country, and therefore has a presence in almost every single town and city in South Africa.

== History ==
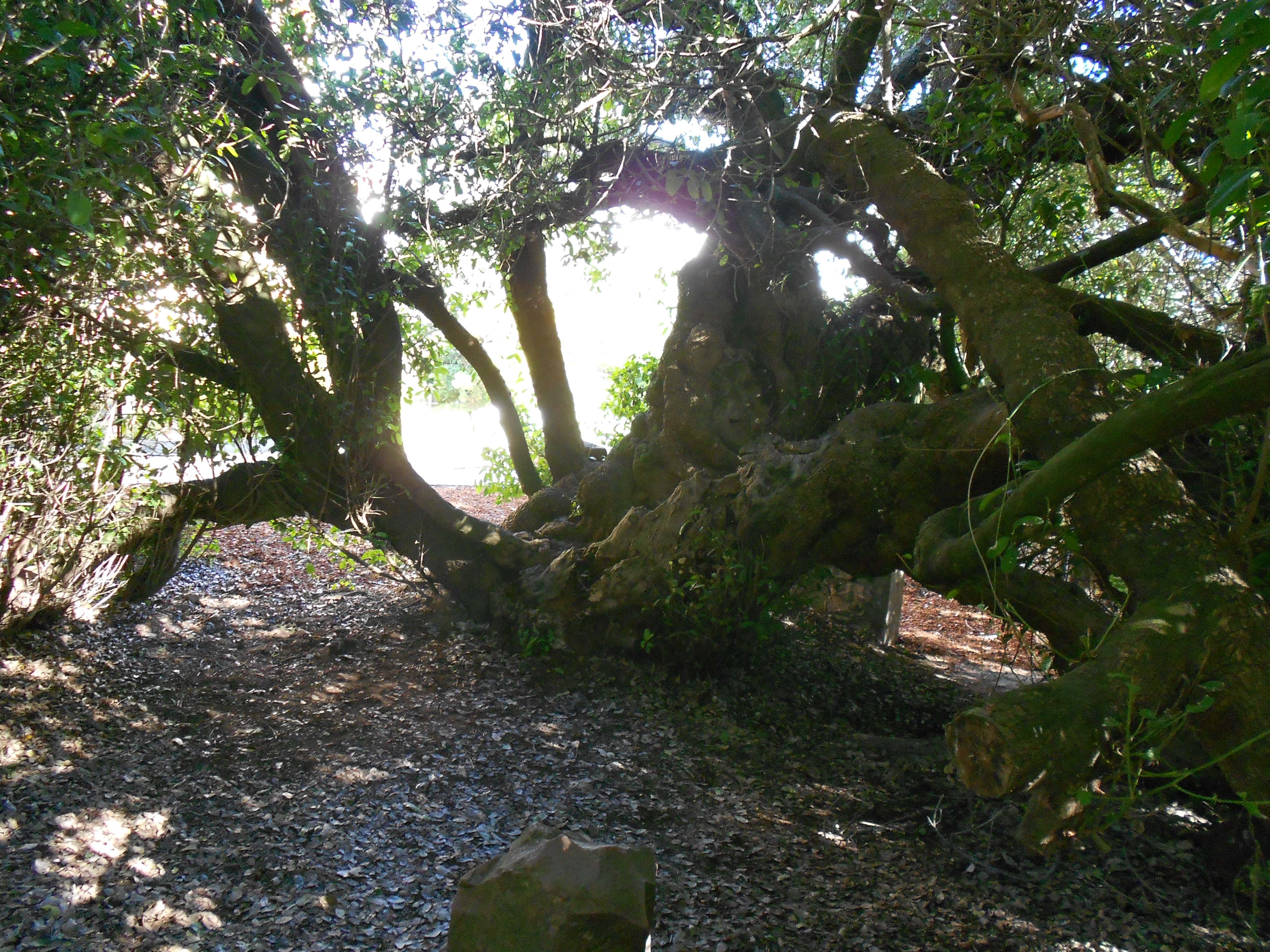
The Post Office Tree at Mossel Bay

The history of postal services in Southern Africa can be traced back over 500 years. In 1500, the captain of a Portuguese ship, Petro D'Ataide, placed a letter in a milkwood tree at Mossel Bay. He reported the sinking of three ships in his fleet, including that of Bartolomeu Dias, during a heavy storm over the Atlantic Ocean.

Portuguese ships regularly stopped at Mossel Bay to take on fresh water, and three months later, the letter was found and delivered to Portugal. Sailors travelling to or from the Orient past the south coast of Africa, placed letters under postal stones, hoping that they would be found and delivered by other ships.

On 2 March 1792 the acting governor of the Cape, Johan Isaac Rhenius, opened a post office in a room next to the pantry at the Castle of Good Hope in Cape Town. This was the start of what became the South African Post Office (SAPO). By 1805, there was a regular inland mail service between Algoa Bay and False Bay in the Cape, using farmers on horseback.

A mail wagon ran twice a week between Cape Town and the town of Stellenbosch. In 1806, Sir David Baird ruled that Khoi, enslaved indigenous people of the Cape, would be used to convey letters and small packages. A mail boat service was introduced between England and the Cape in 1815 and in 1848, the then Transvaal government appointed postmen to transport official mail. Prior to this development mail had been sent by special messenger, or by any available transport.

The first stamp issued in South Africa was the Cape Triangular stamp introduced in 1853. The stamp has two values – the four pence blue and the one penny red. In 1860, the first postboxes were erected in the Cape and several railway lines were completed and used to transport mail. The first mail train was introduced in 1883.

In 1867, diamonds were discovered in South Africa, and in 1905, the largest diamond in the world, the Cullinan, was sent to London as a normal recorded postal article. Mail was transported by motor car for the first time in 1911, and SAPO experimented using camels to deliver mail, replacing them with an ox cart service in 1914.

In December 1911, the first air mail delivery took place with a seven-and-a-half minute flight from Kenilworth in Cape Town to Muizenberg. The mail was carried in the same model of aircraft as that used two years earlier by Louis Bleriot to cross the English Channel.

By 1919, there was a regular motor car service, and a regular air-mail service was introduced the same year. The first overseas air-mail service was introduced in 1932, and the Springbok Air Service was introduced between the Union of South Africa and Britain in 1945. The first definitive stamp series of the Republic of South Africa was issued on 31 May 1961 after South Africa withdrew from the Commonwealth because of its apartheid policies at the time.

In 1973, postcodes were introduced to facilitate automated mail sorting and standardised letters were introduced later that year. In 1994, South Africa was readmitted to the Universal Postal Union following the end of minority rule. SAPO currently operates under a 25-year license granted by the Independent Communication Authority of South Africa (ICASA) and as such must provide a universal service to all the citizens of the country.

== Postbank ==
The second largest activity of the group was financial services, which it offered through its savings banks that operates under the name Postbank. Postbank was formed in 1910 and is the largest savings bank in the country. More than 6 million customers have accounts with Postbank making it one of the largest banks in South Africa as measured by customer number. Postbank is a deposit-taking institution only, and thus offers savings and investment products, but no credit products.

On 27 September 2023, Postbank was officially separated from the Post Office as The Postbank SOC Limited.

== Current activities ==
The South African Post Office Group currently consist of a number of divisions and subsidiaries operating in the fields of mail, financial services, logistics, property, electronic commerce and retail services. Traditional collection, sorting and delivery of letters and parcels constitute the primary business activity of the group, responsible for nearly 65% of the groups revenue in 2010/12. In the 2010/11 financial year nearly 1.5 billion mail pieces were processed.

To process and distribute this volume of mail items, SAPO operates 6 large mail centers and more than 40 depots across the republic. The group has, however, suffered a decline in traditional mail volumes over the last 3 years. This decline is in line with similar declines experienced by the majority of postal operators across the world as traditional mail as a communication medium is substituted by electronic alternatives such as email and more recently cell phones.

In 2021 the parcel delivery both locally and internationally is unreliable and delays of more than six months are common. Overseas Christmas cards normally reach their destination in March. In an attempt to regain lost market share of the postal delivery market, the Post Office proposed that legislation be passed requiring that all packages weighing 1kg or less be delivered by it. If passed, this would give the Post Office a government enforced monopoly over the delivery of small packages.

The South African Post Office has been plagued by employee thefts of goods and parcels. This has resulted in the termination of employment and prosecution of postal workers.

== Funding ==
The South African Post Office has, for a number of years, been suffering increasing financial losses due to mismanagement, corruption, and competition from the private sector. On 12 April 2023 it was provisionally liquidated, putting the jobs of 16,400+ employees at risk and creating problems for its clients, especially in the rural areas.

However, the company appointed business rescue practitioners, setting the process aside. The business rescue practitioners assumed the responsibility of the Post Office’s Board of Directors, as well as the Accounting Authority. The business rescue plan was adopted by the group’s creditors in December 2023, with the turnaround strategy seeking to close several branches and reduce SAPO's workforce. SAPO subsequently retrenched over 4,300 employees during April and May 2024. Furthermore, 366 Post Office branches permanently closed, leaving the total number of branches remaining at 650.

SAPO received a R2.4 billion bailout from the government budget in 2023/24 financial year. For its 2024 financial year, the Post Office recorded an operating loss of R2.17 billion.

In May 2025, the South African Minister of Employment and Labour formally implemented a R381 million bailout for SAPO. The signed agreement between SAPO and the country's Unemployment Insurance Fund (UIF) aims to preserve 6,000 jobs and support the revitalization of the Post Office. This is the first strategic partnership between the two entities.

The UIF will use the Temporary Employer-Employee Relief Scheme (TERS) to inject over R381 million into SAPO over a 6-month period. The Department of Labour stated that SAPO will submit regular reports, maintain transparent accounting records, and implement a detailed turnaround strategy as a condition of the funding.

SAPO's business rescue practitioners stated in a presentation to the Portfolio Committee that R3.8 billion in funding was still needed to implement its business rescue plan. The Post Office's corporate plan through to 2030 is positive, and shows that the group anticipates a continued reduction of losses over the next 5 years, with a turn to profit expected in 2028.

In late May 2025, SAPO's business rescue practitioners told Members of Parliament that they had successfully turned around SAPO's results, and were preparing to exit their undertaking to do so. This is despite coming under criticism from Committee members in Parliament for not updating them, and not making significant progress in turning SAPO around. The practitioners claimed that SAPO was in its best shape since 2012, and that they were preparing a court application to begin a process of terminating the business rescue proceedings.

== See also ==
- NamPost
