= Treaty Tree =

Historical landmark in Cape Town

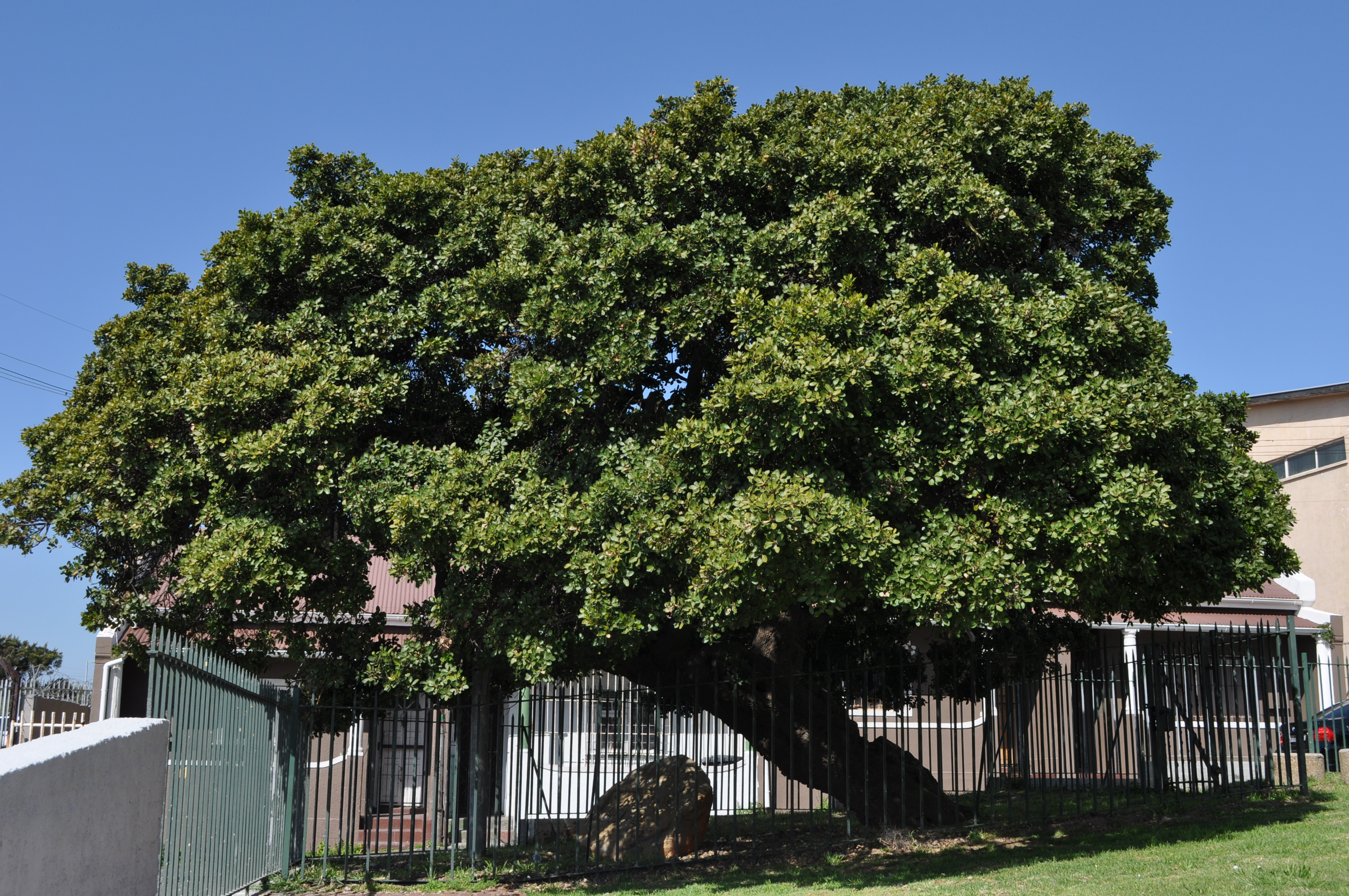
- The Treaty Tree in 2012
- Species: White milkwood (Sideroxylon inerme)
- Location: Woodstock, Cape Town, South Africa
- Coordinates: 33°55′35″S 18°27′05″E
- Date seeded: Before 1509

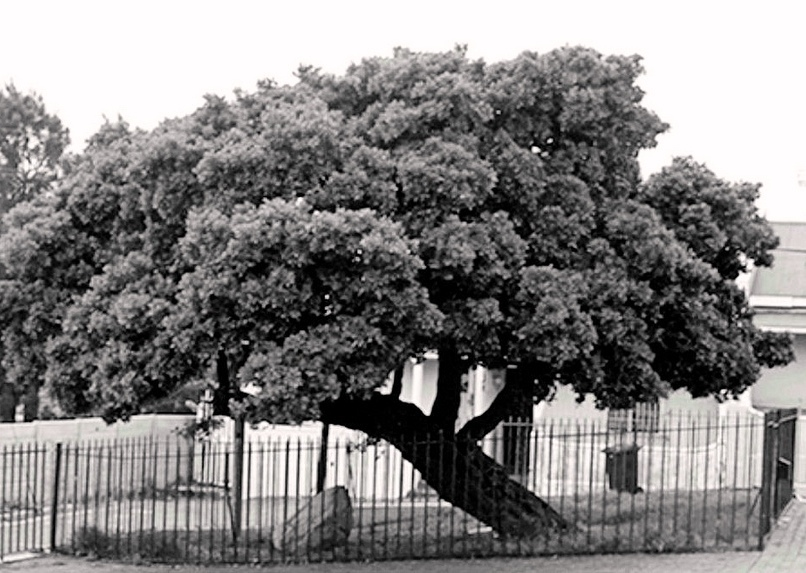
The Treaty Tree. A 500-year-old White Milkwood tree in Woodstock, Cape Town.

The Treaty Tree (Afrikaans: Verdragboom or Traktaatboom) is a 500-year-old white milkwood tree on Treaty Road and south of the rail line in Woodstock, Cape Town, South Africa. Peace was made under the tree on 10 January 1806 after the Battle of Blaauwberg, thereby starting the second British occupation of the Cape and leading to the permanent establishment of the Cape Colony as a British possession. Until 1834, slaves were sold and convicts hanged under it.

Prior to the arrival of the Dutch, the tree was a feature of the local landscape since at least the early 1500s. During the Battle of Salt River, in 1510, a massacre by Khoikhoi of 64 Portuguese sailors and their commander Dom Francisco de Almeida took place close to the tree.

== Protection ==
The City of Cape Town owns the property, and the tree was declared a monument in 1967.

== See also ==
- Post Office Tree in Mosselbay – one of several other South African white milkwood trees that have been declared monuments
- List of individual trees

== Bibliography ==
- Green, Lawrence G.: I heard the old men say. Kaapstad: Howard Timmins, 1964.
- Oberholster, J.J.: Die historiese monumente van Suid-Afrika. Kaapstad: Kultuurstigting Rembrandt van Rijn vir die Raad vir Nasionale Gedenkwaardighede, 1972.
