= Financial Sector Charter =

The South African Financial Sector Charter is a transformation charter in terms of the Broad-based Black Economic Empowerment (BBBEE) Act.

The Charter came into effect in January 2004 as a result of the Financial Sector Summit hosted by the National Economic Development and Labour Council (Nedlac), the multilateral social dialogue forum on social, economic and labour policy. The Nedlac partners – government, business, labour and community constituencies – negotiated the Financial Sector Summit Agreements on transforming the financial sector and signed the Summit declaration on 20 August 2002.

== Charter Objectives ==
The objectives of the Charter are to:

- Constitute a framework and establish the principles upon which BEE will be implemented in the financial sector;
- Provide the basis for the sector's engagement with other stakeholders
- Establish targets and unquantified responsibilities in respect of each principle; and
- Outline processes for implementing the charter and mechanisms to monitor and report on progress.

In pursuit of these objectives, the Charter commits financial institutions in the sector to transforming in the areas of:

- Human resource development;
- Procurement of goods and services;
- Access to financial services;
- Empowerment financing [including targeted investments in transformational infrastructure, low-income housing, agricultural development and black SMEs as well as BEE transaction financing];
- Ownership and control and
- Corporate social investment.
