= NamPost =

- Company type: State owned company
- Industry: Postal services, courier, banking
- Founded: 1992
- Headquarters: 175 Independence Avenue, Windhoek, Namibia
- Area served: Namibia / Worldwide
- Key people: Festus Hangula (Chief Executive Officer)
- Services: Letter post, parcel service, banking
- Total assets: N$ 2.51 million
- Number of employees: 743
- Website: nampost.com.na

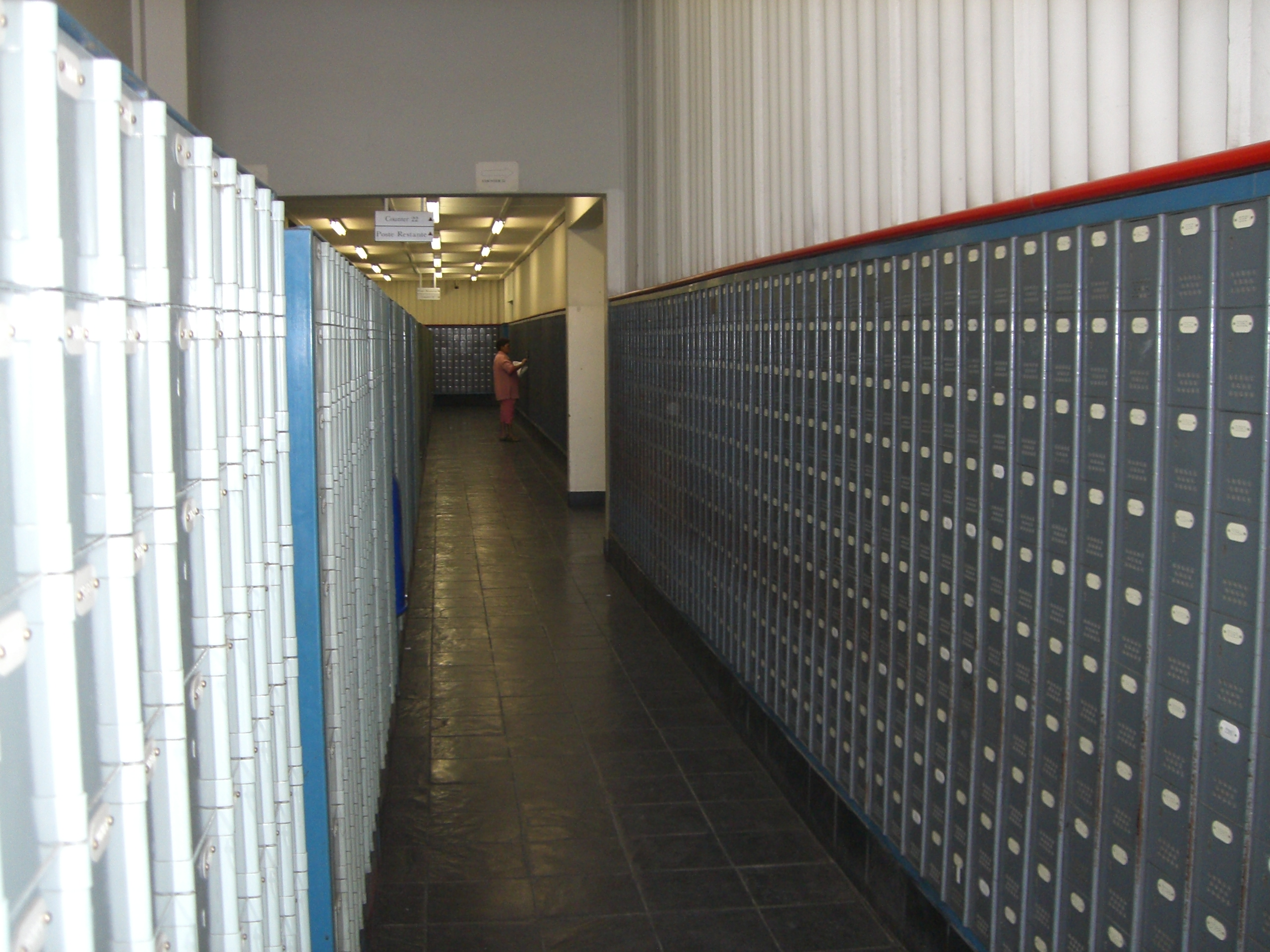
Post boxes inside the NamPost main building in Windhoek

NamPost is the national postal service of Namibia. It currently has 743 employees and reserves of N$ 2.51 million. The current CEO of NamPost is Festus Hangula.

== History ==
The first postal services in then South West Africa started in 1814 with the deployment of messengers facilitating communication between the early mission stations at Warmbad and Bethanie and later to Keetmanshoop and Gross Barmen. This service was expanded in 1846, connecting the South West African mission stations to those in South Africa.

The first post office of South West Africa was founded in Otjimbingwe in 1888, with more offices being established in Windhoek in 1891 and Swakopmund in 1895. In 1992, NamPost was founded, managing 92 post offices in Namibia. In 2012, this number had risen to 135.

== See also ==
- South African Post Office
