= Old Treaty Elm =

Former Elm in Chicago

Coordinates: 41°59′8″N 87°44′27″W

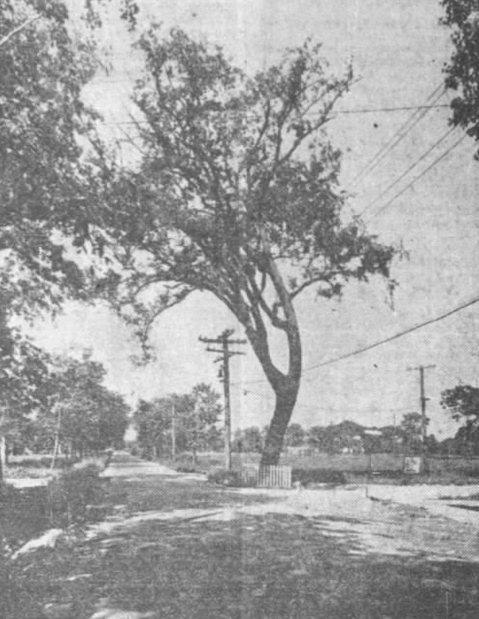
- The tree in 1928.
- Interactive map of Old Treaty Elm
- Location: Chicago, Illinois,

The Old Treaty Elm marked the Northern boundary of the Fort Dearborn Reservation, the approximate edge of the Billy Caldwell Reserve, and the trail to Lake Geneva. The tree was located in the Sauganash neighborhood of Chicago, Illinois, and stood until 1934. The marker is placed several feet west of the actual location of the trunk of the tree, which stood approximately in the middle of what is now Kilbourn Avenue, just north of Rogers Avenue, which is the Old Indian Boundary Line.

The tree was a point of reference used in the 1836 surveying of the 1600 acre reserve. It divided the reserve into two equal tracts containing 800 acres each. Contrary to folklore, Billy Caldwell did not endorse the Treaty of Chicago under it. Nor did he receive an annuity payment under it prior to moving to Platte County, Missouri in 1835. The treaty, negotiated and signed in 1833 and enacted in 1835, ceded Indian land on the western shore of Lake Michigan to the US Government in return for land west of the Mississippi River, in what was to become Missouri.

By the late 1920s, the tree was in ill health; in March 1929 tree surgery was performed in an attempt to extend its life.

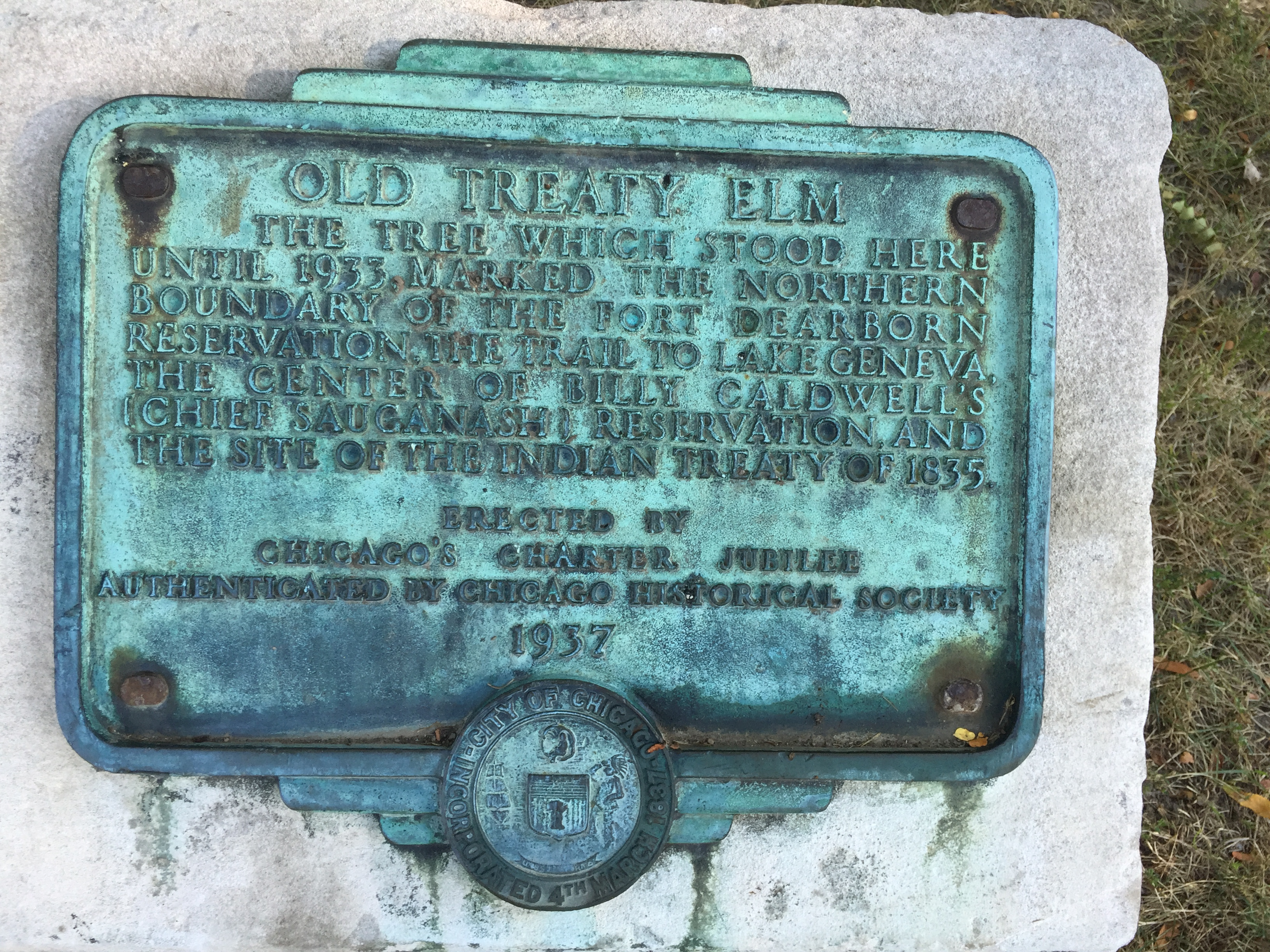
Old Treaty Elm Marker
