= Woodstock, Cape Town =

Suburb of Cape Town, in Western Cape, South Africa

Woodstock
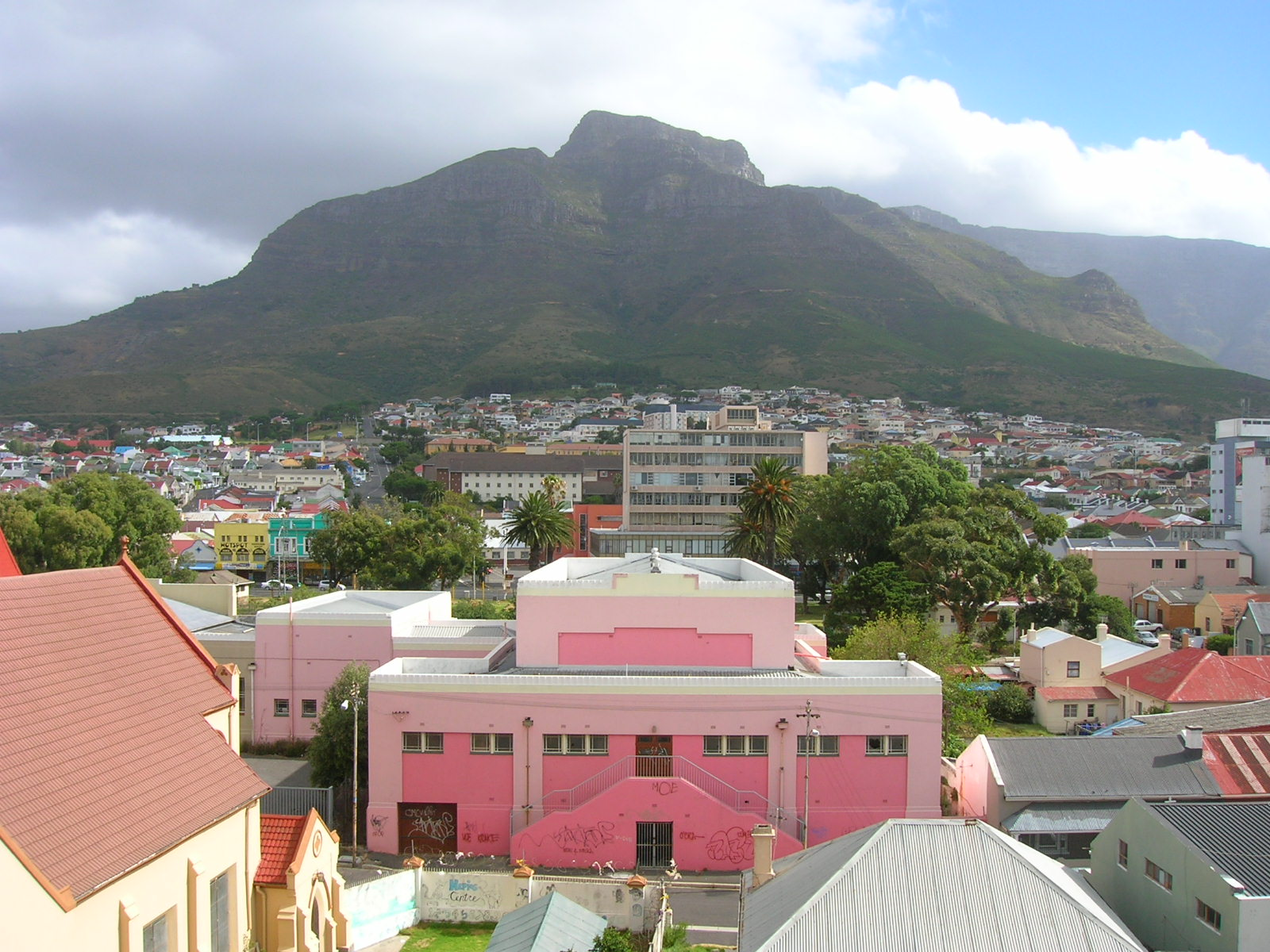
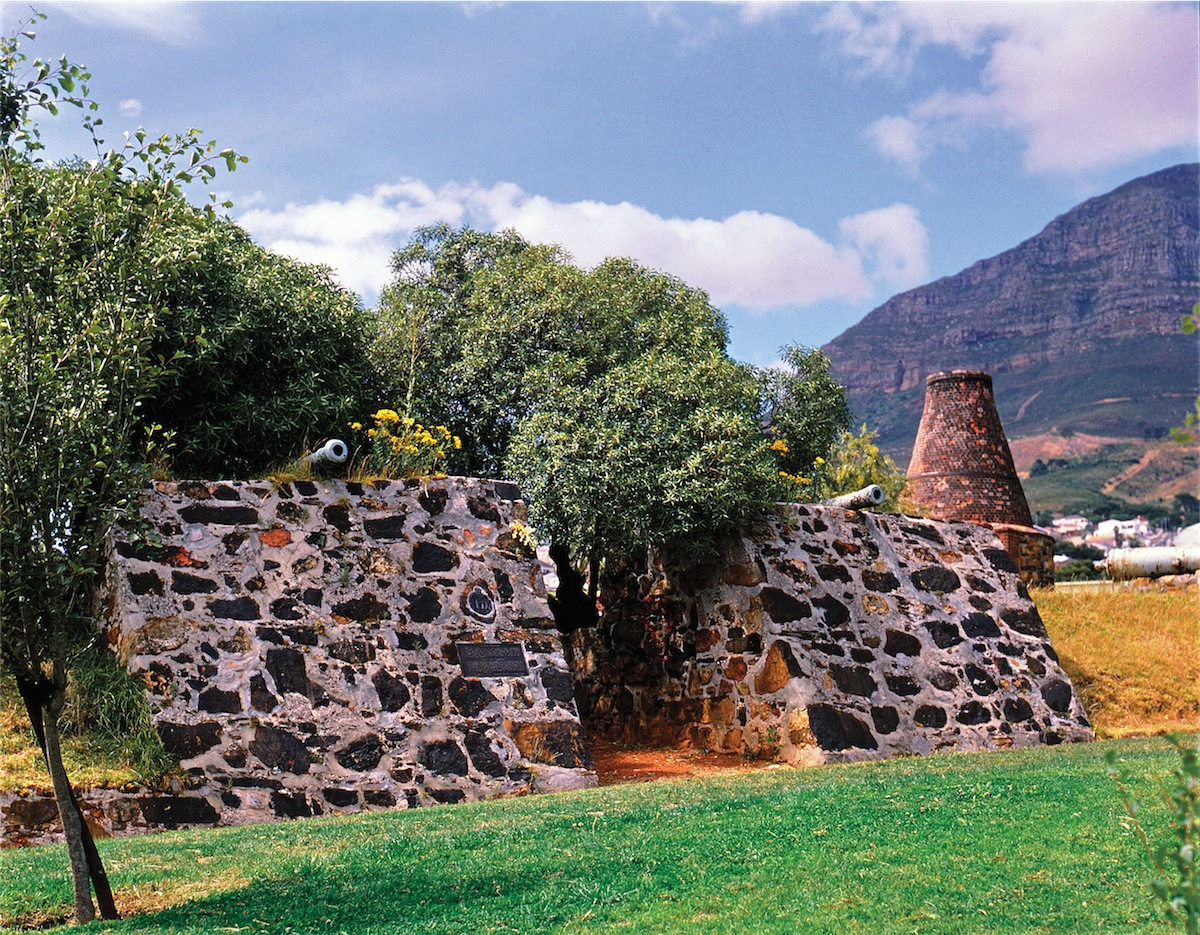
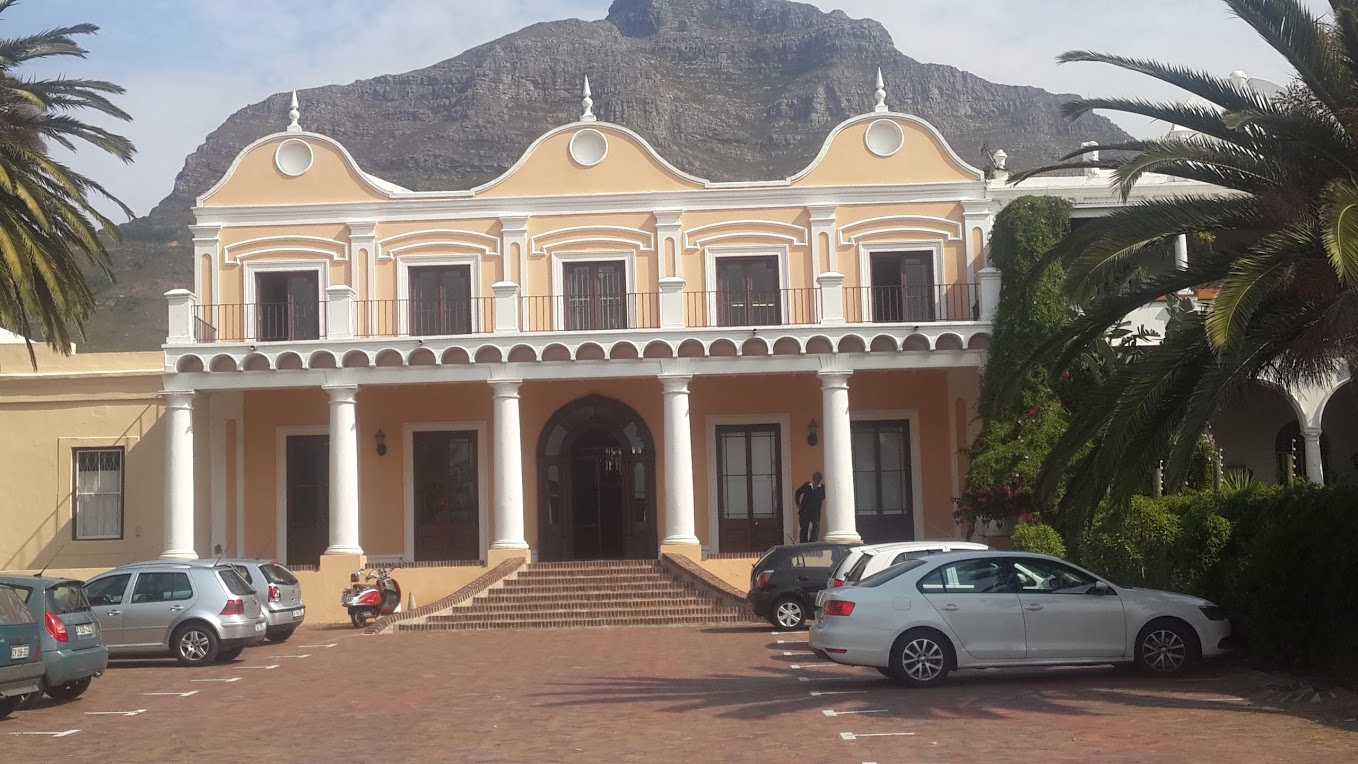
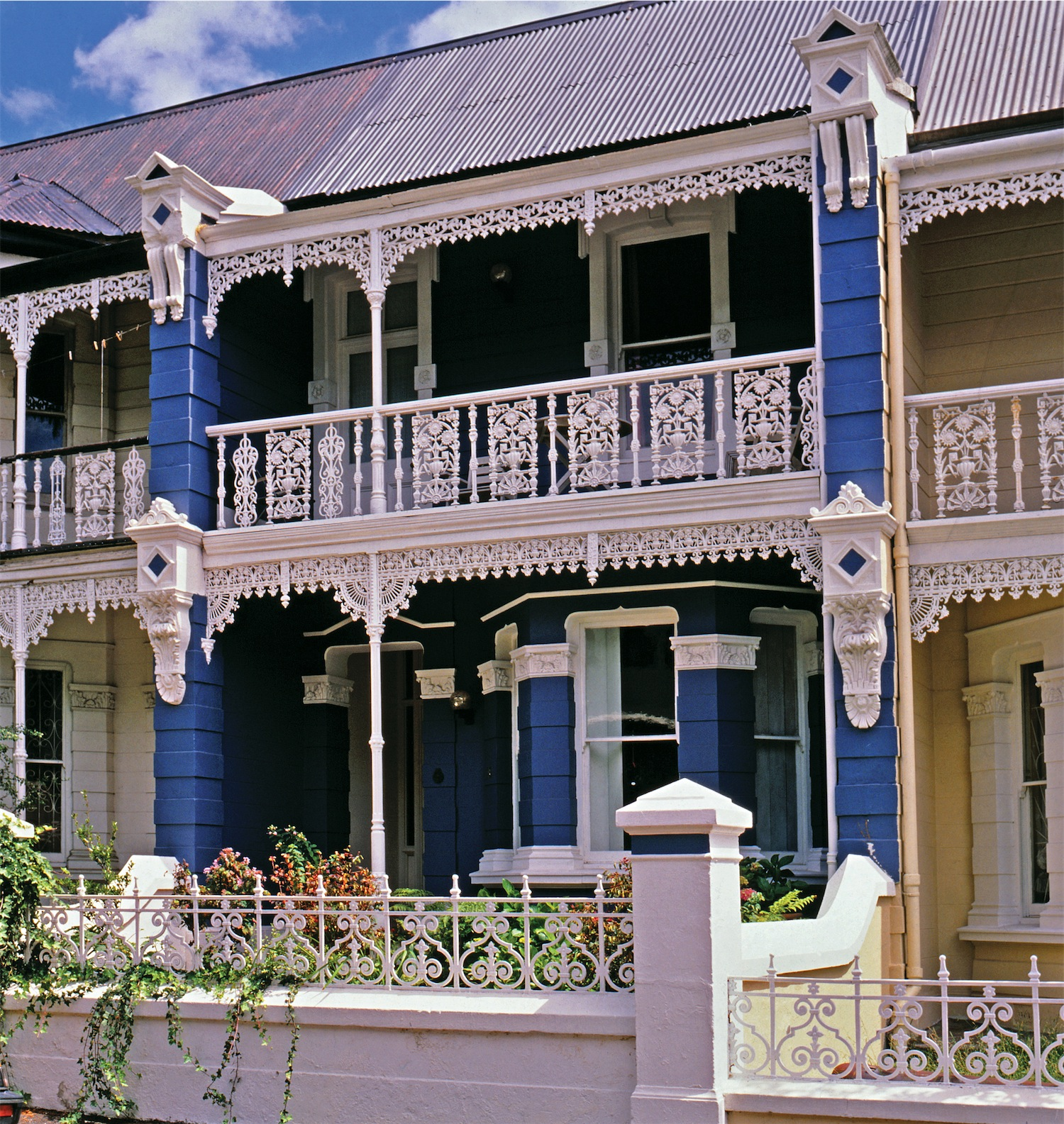
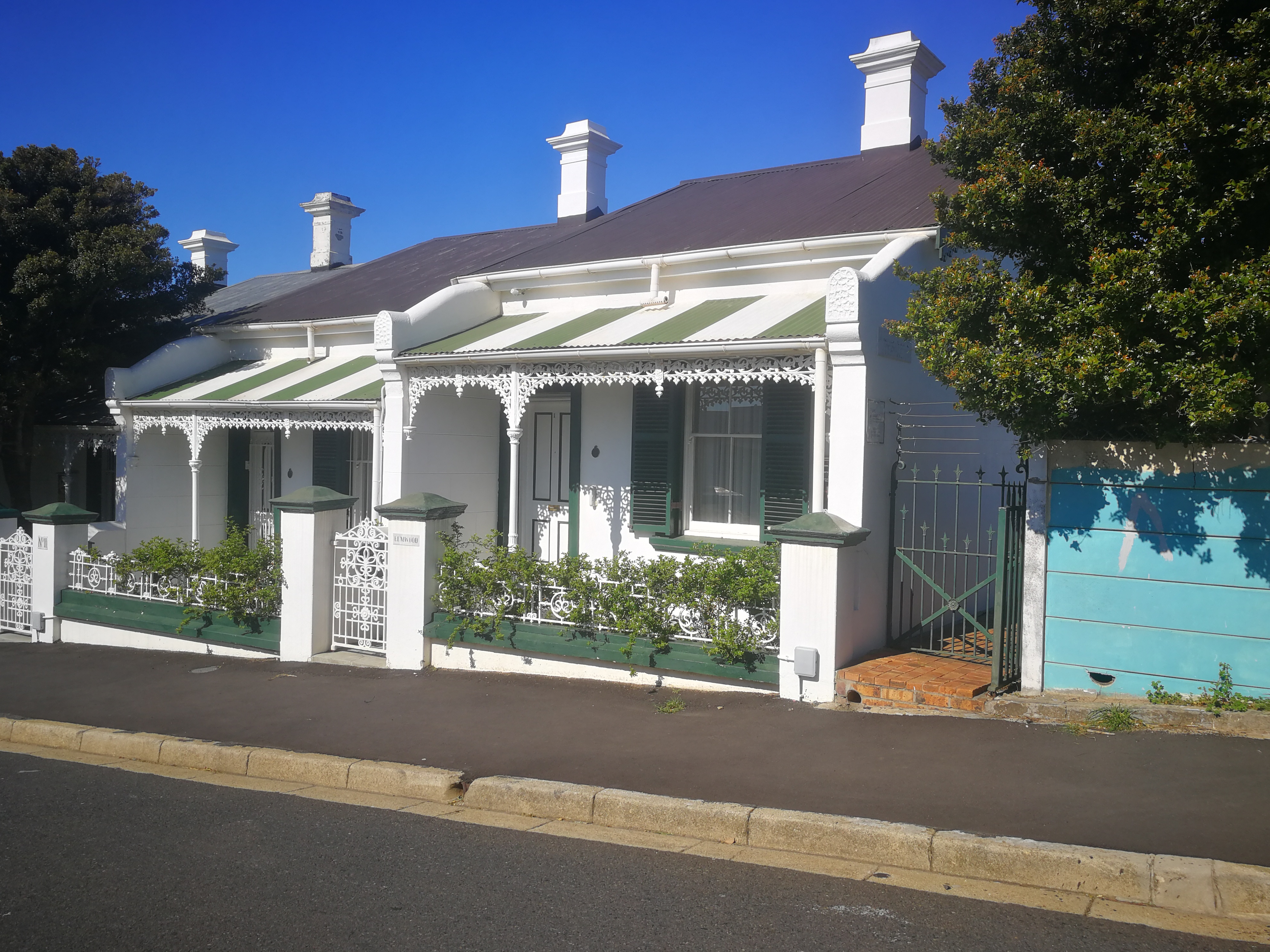
- Top: Southern part of Woodstock, seen from the northern end, with Devil's Peak in the background. The pink building in the foreground is the town hall, middle left: The French Redoubt/Fort, Ruth Prowse Art School, Traditional Victorian homes in Woodstock.
- Nickname: "Little Madeira"
- Street map of Woodstock

- Location within Western Cape Location within South Africa
- Coordinates: 33°55′50″S 18°26′50″E
- Country: South Africa
- Province: Western Cape
- Municipality: City of Cape Town
- Main Place: Cape Town

Government
  - Councillor (Ward 57): Yusuf Mohamed (DA)
  - Councillor (Ward 115): Ian McMahon (DA)
  - Councillor (Ward 55): Fabian Ah-Sing (DA)

Area
  - Total: 3.10 km^{2} (1.20 sq mi)

Population (2011)
  - Total: 9,345
  - Density: 3,010/km^{2} (7,810/sq mi)

Racial makeup (2011)
  - Black African: 29.1%
  - Coloured: 50.9%
  - Indian/Asian: 2.8%
  - White: 11.6%
  - Other: 5.6%

First languages (2011)
  - English: 63.8%
  - Afrikaans: 18.1%
  - Xhosa: 2.0%
  - Other: 16.0%
- Time zone: UTC+2 (SAST)
- Postal code (street): 7925
- PO box: 7915
- Area code: 021

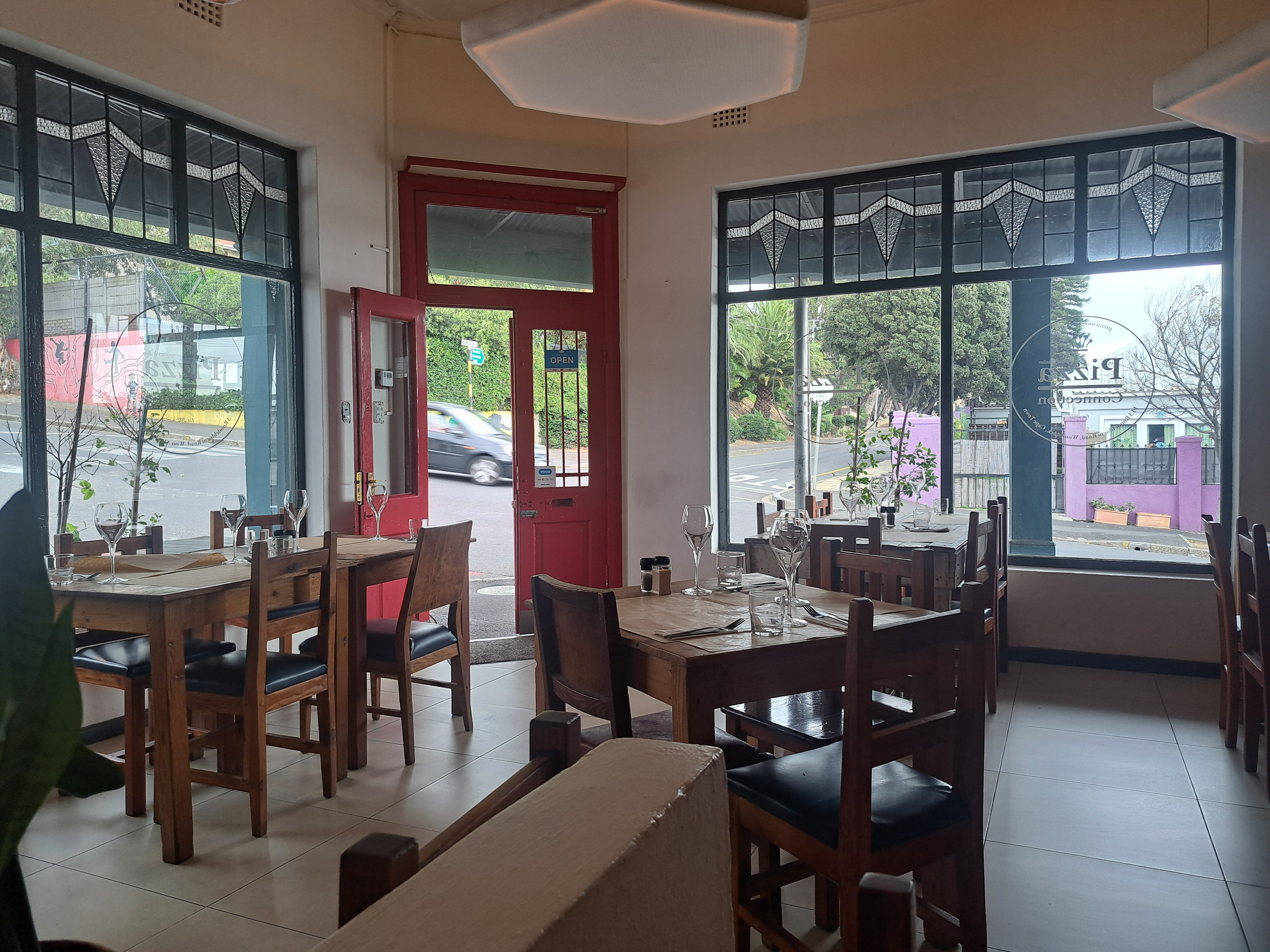
Inside Pizza Connection, a restaurant in Woodstock

Woodstock is a suburb in Cape Town, South Africa, situated between the docks of Table Bay and the lower slopes of Devil's Peak. One of the city's oldest suburbs, Woodstock is located around 1 kilometre (0.6 mi) east of Cape Town CBD, the city's main economic hub.

The suburb serves as a mixed-use area, with residential, commercial, and light industrial zoning, similar to that of neighboring Salt River.

== History ==
The area was inhabited by Khoikhoi until the arrival of Dutch in the 1600s. Three freehold farms (Zonnebloem, Leliebloem and Roodebloem) were established on the slopes of Devils Peak in 1692 and as the area became populated it became known as Papendorp - after Pieter van Papendorp, who had settled in the area during the mid-eighteenth century.

By the middle of the 19th century, especially after the arrival of the railway line, Woodstock had become a fashionable seaside suburb with cottages next to the sea and a beach which stretched until the Castle of Good Hope. In the age of sail a number of violent storms led to many spectacular shipwrecks along the beach. After a brief stint as New Brighton the residents voted in 1867 at the Woodstock Hotel to change the area’s name to Woodstock.

During the 1870s with the subdivision of the old farms for low cost housing, Woodstock began to grow so rapidly that by 1884, less than a year after becoming a separate municipality, Woodstock was the third largest ‘town’ in the country.

Ease of access to the harbour; improved transport; increased industrialisation and a rapidly growing working class population meant that the massive demand for supplies from the British troops during the First and Second Anglo-Boer Wars (1881 and 1899-1902) could be met, and industrial activity flourished, permanently changing the nature of the suburb. The first glass manufactured in South Africa was made at the Woodstock Glass Factory in 1879.

With the massive land reclamation of Table Bay in the 1950s to create the Cape Town foreshore Woodstock beach was lost, and combined with the increasingly industrial nature of the suburb, Woodstock ceased to be a seaside resort. Woodstock however managed to remain integrated during Apartheid and survived being declared a ‘whites only’ area with the attendant forced removals and demolition of houses as happened in nearby District Six.

As a ‘grey’ area, many coloured and black people started to move into Woodstock during the 1970s and 1980s, laying the foundation for the urban renewal which was to start in the late 1990s.

Woodstock also became the first suburb in the city where a distinct Portuguese, ethnic community developed. The Portuguese population in the city increased from 228 immigrants in 1936 to 1649 immigrants by 1970. A total of 675 of these immigrants, coming from Madeira, settled in Woodstock between 1940-1980, and the area earned the nickname "Little Madeira".

Portuguese fishermen first settled in the suburb in the 1930s and became known as the "pioneers" of the Portuguese diaspora in the Cape. They chose to settled in Woodstock for its location close to the harbour and for its relative affordability.

== Urban renewal ==
Notwithstanding the lower parts of Woodstock becoming run down in the second half of the 20th century, with litter, crime and drugs becoming a serious issue, the face of Woodstock has changed dramatically over the last decade.

Young professionals have been quick to take advantage of Victorian semi-detached homes, many of which have been renovated and restored. Restaurants, media and other businesses, offices, shops and furniture showrooms have sprung up in converted and revamped warehouses, abandoned buildings and even a disused Castle Brewery.

== Places of interest ==
- The Treaty Tree is an old milkwood tree in Treaty Road where in 1806 the peace treaty between the British and Batavians was signed after the Battle of Blaauwberg. Until 1834, slaves were sold and convicts hung under it.
- Woodstock cave is a fairly large but shallow cave or overhang situated halfway up Devil's Peak
- The King's, Queen's and Prince of Wales' blockhouses on Devil's Peak.
- The Woodstock Foundry, 160 Albert Road, Woodstock
- The Old Biscuit Mill is now a retail centre with a neighbourhood market.
- The suburb is home to the roastery of one of South Africa's main coffeehouse chains, Bootlegger. One of the largest micro-roasteries in South Africa, the facility uses beans sourced from Central Africa and South America, and produces between 350 and 400 tons of coffee per year.

== Education ==
Educational institutions located in Woodstock include:

- Mountain Road Primary School
- Observatory Junior School
- St Agnes' Primary School
- Queen's Park High School

== Coat of arms ==
The Woodstock municipal council adopted a pseudo-heraldic coat of arms, designed by Mr St Vincent Cripps, in February 1892.

The shield was divided horizontally, the upper half depicting a sinking sailing ship and the lower half a man on horseback riding into the sea (both evidently referring to Wolraad Woltemade's heroic sea rescue efforts in 1773. The crest was a dolphin entwined around a crowned anchor; the supporters were two lions (one upright, the other doing a handstand(!)); and the motto was Per mare per terras.

== Notable residents ==
- Owen McCann, Catholic cardinal
