= Communications Regulatory Authority of Namibia =

Regulatory body of postal and telecommunication services in Namibia

- CRAN

Agency overview
- Formed: 18 May 2011
- Preceding agency: Namibia Communications Commission
- Jurisdiction: Republic of Namibia
- Headquarters: Windhoek
- Employees: ±50
- Website: CRAN

The Communications Regulatory Authority of Namibia (CRAN), established by the Namibian Communication Act (Act No. 8 of 2009) on 18 May 2011 with the mandate to regulate postal and telecommunication services. It emerged from the former Namibia Communications Commission. CRAN is accountable to the Ministry of Information and Communication Technology of Namibia.

== See also ==
- Media of Namibia
- Telecommunications in Namibia
