= TBN Namibia =

- Country: Namibia
- Broadcast area: Namibia
- Headquarters: Windhoek, Namibia

Programming
- Language: English
- Picture format: 1080i (16:9 HDTV)

History
- Launched: 15 May 2002; 23 years ago

Links
- Website: www.tbnnamibia.tv

TBN Namibia is the Namibian affiliate of the Trinity Broadcasting Network, a United States-based multinational evangelical television network. The station started broadcasting in 2002 and airs a limited amount of local programming, financed by its local partners.

== History ==
The idea behind TBN Namibia traces back to 1986, when Namibia was under South African rule. Coenie and Edna (Granny Be) Botha had a dream where they set up a television station to deliver messages from the Gospel. This wasn't achieved until September 2001, when TBN Namibia received its broadcasting license. On 15 May 2002, the station started broadcasting from Windhoek with limited technical equipment, as the station only had one camera and none of its staff were trained for television. A second transmitter (Swakopmund serving Walvis Bay) was installed in October 2002. By May 2003, one year after its founding, the station was receivable in Windhoek, Rehoboth and Okahandja with a single 1 kW transmitter. Terrestrial coverage increased in 2006, using satellite connections, but over time, some of the relay stations were considered inoperative due to lack of payments.

TBN is the only community television station in Namibia, having received a permit from the authorities to do so.

In 2009, the station broadcast ten hours of local programming a week. Programming included a programme from the No Walls Apostolic House of God, as well as in-house productions such as Profile on God's People, God, Money and You, and Voice of Destiny. Edna was also a presenter, she also presenter its news service News & Around. The two founders of the station were responsible for donations. Its arrival revealed the power of pentecostal and neo-evangelical sects, driven by migration from rural to urban areas. In 2015, its local content quota was below the 20% minimum required for Namibian channels. Edna refused giving time for individuals who were not "watchable" and were "already struggling to fill their churches".
