= Post Office Tree =

Tree in Mossel Bay, South Africa

Coordinates: 34.180363°S 22.141382°E

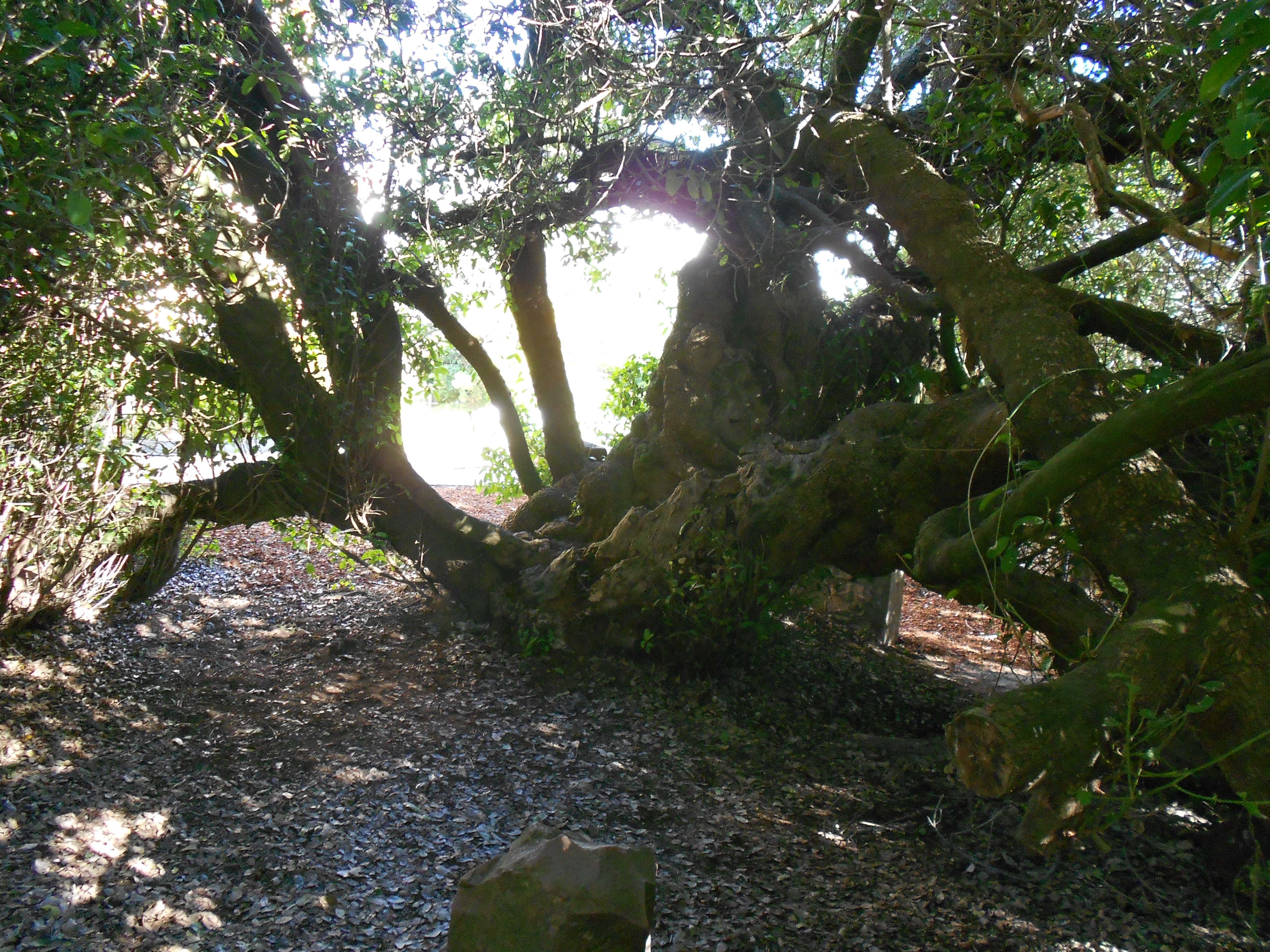
The Post Office Tree

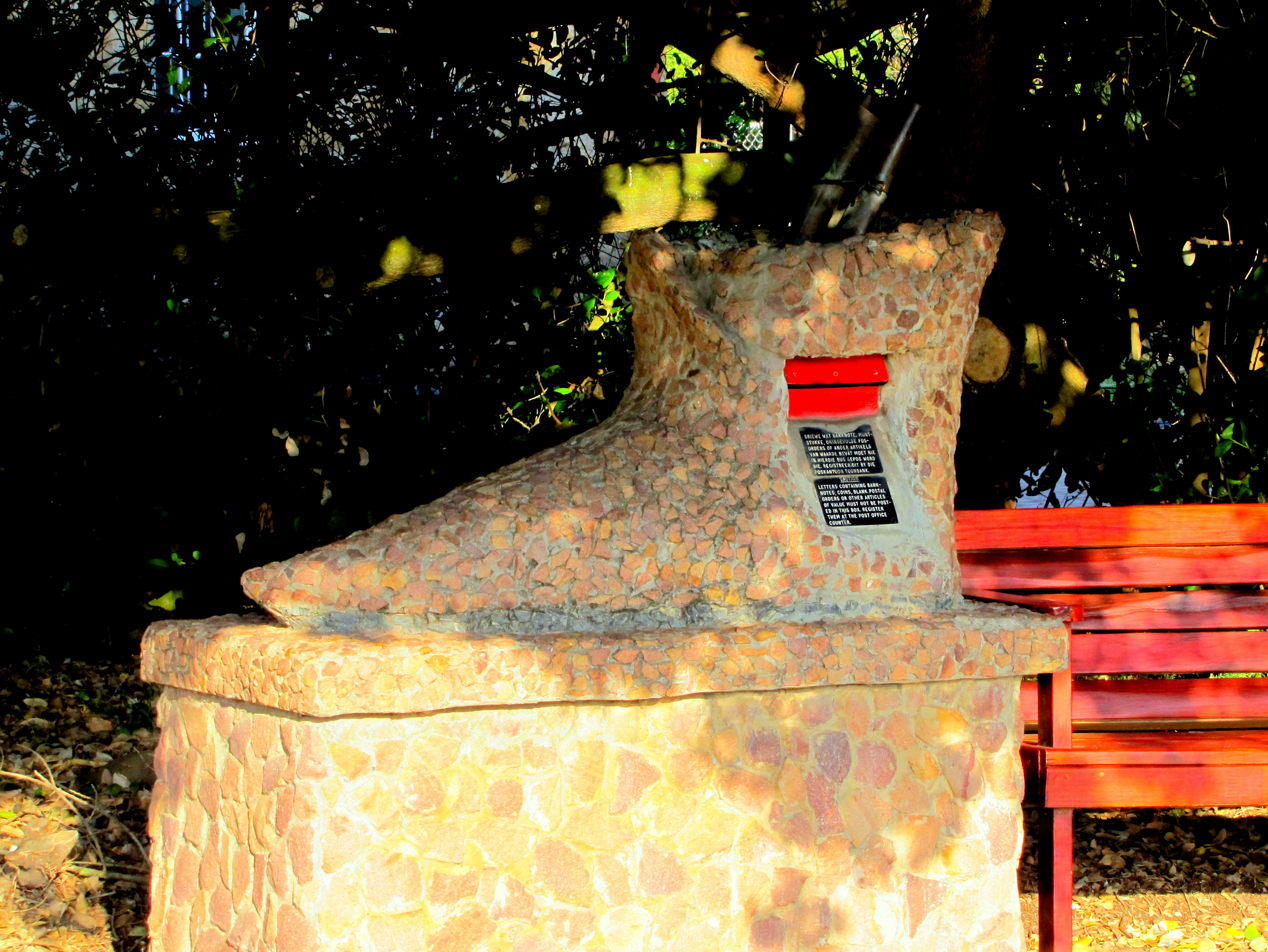
The Post Office Tree monument

The Post Office Tree (Afrikaans: Poskantoorboom) is a famous milkwood tree (Sideroxylon inerme) in Mossel Bay, South Africa that was used by early Portuguese explorers as a post office. It is located in the grounds of the Bartholomeu Dias Museum Complex in Market Street.

== History ==
In 1501, Portuguese navigator Pêro de Ataíde sought shelter in Mossel Bay after losing much of his fleet in a storm. He left an account of the disaster hidden in an old shoe which he suspended from a milkwood tree (Sideroxylon inerme) near the spring from which explorer Bartolomeu Dias had drawn water. The report was found by the explorer to whom it was addressed, João da Nova, and the tree served as a kind of de facto post office for decades thereafter. João da Nova erected a small shrine near the Post Office Tree, and although no traces of it remain, it is considered the first place of Christian worship in South Africa.

More recently, a boot-shaped post box has been erected under the now famous tree, and letters posted there are franked with a commemorative stamp. This has ensured that the tree has remained one of the town’s biggest tourist attractions.

== See also ==
- List of individual trees
- List of Champion Trees (South Africa)
