= Telecom Namibia =

Namibian telecommunication company

Telecom Namibia Limited
- Industry: Telecommunications / Mobile telecommunications
- Founded: 1992
- Headquarters: Windhoek, Khomas Region, Namibia
- Key people: Stanley Shanapinda (Chief Executive Officer)
- Products: Landline services Broadband (copper, fibre, wireless); Mobile telecommunications (GSM, 3G, 4G LTE, 4.5G, limited 5G-ready); FMC products Web hosting Domain, Email; Colocation; Maritime radio and NAVTEX services
- Revenue: ~ N$1.5 billion
- Number of employees: 986 (8 September 2025)
- Subsidiaries: PowerCom
- Website: www.telecom.na

Telecom Namibia Limited, commonly known as Telecom Namibia, is a telecommunications and ICT service provider operating in Namibia. Established in August 1992, it is wholly owned by the Government of Namibia and serves as the national telecommunications operator. The company serves over 396,000 fixed and mobile customers, employs 986 people, and generates annual revenue of approximately N$1.5 billion.

Telecom Namibia has invested billions of Namibian dollars in nationwide infrastructure and international connectivity, including subsea cables such as SAT-3, SEACOM, WACS, and Google's Equiano cable, making the company a regional internet hub and digital gateway for the SADC region. Its network now spans over 13,000 kilometres of backbone fibre, with more than 500 IP/MPLS points of presence, 228 digital destinations, and over 300 towers for mobile and fixed wireless services.

Telecom Namibia acquired tn mobile in 2013, which now operates as its mobile division. Its main competitors are MTC Namibia, Paratus Telecom, and MTN Namibia.

== Services ==
=== Fixed ===
Telecom Namibia holds the monopoly for landline access in Namibia. In June 2022, there were 88,000 accesses, a decline of about 40 percent compared to 2021. Customers in some cities are connected via fibre, with technologies such as DSL and ISDN also in use.

=== Mobile ===
Telecom Namibia initially offered cellular communication using CDMA under the brand SWITCH, officially established as Namibia's third cellular provider at the end of 2009, with around 54,000 customers by mid-2010. In August 2011, the CDMA network was transformed into a GSM network.

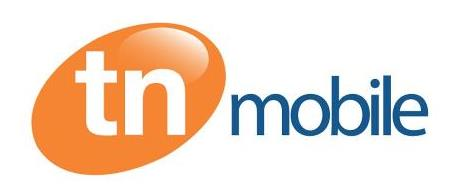
TN mobile logo

Cell One, introduced in 2007 and renamed Leo in 2009, developed into the mobile telecommunications division of Telecom Namibia. In 2012, the Communications Regulatory Authority of Namibia (CRAN) approved the takeover of Leo by Telecom Namibia. Later that year Telecom Namibia acquired Leo, fully incorporated it in 2013, and re-launched it in 2013 as tn mobile (Telecom Namibia mobile). Since then, the company expanded its mobile services, upgrading to a 4G LTE network with an IMS core, enabling FMC products, pre-paid 4G LTE devices, and broader mobile broadband coverage. Today, tn mobile provides all Telecom Namibia mobile voice, data, and broadband services, but does not operate as a stand-alone enterprise.

=== Web Hosting ===
Telecom Namibia operates the web-based services brand iWay, which provides web hosting, domain registration, email solutions, and value-added IT services such as website development and SMS platforms. Acquired in 2000, iWay serves residential, SME, and corporate customers.

=== Other Services ===
Telecom Namibia offers colocation to other commercial providers, including MTC Namibia.

In Walvis Bay, Telecom Namibia provides maritime services, including radio and NAVTEX broadcasts for vessels, covering the entire Namibian coast. Its infrastructure includes multiple remote broadcasting stations, and emergency coordination is handled locally in partnership with South African forces. The control room operates 24/7 redundantly.

Telecom Namibia continues to expand broadband and mobile coverage, providing voice and internet access to remote villages, schools, clinics, lodges, and government offices, supporting socio-economic development, e-learning, e-health, and business innovation initiatives.

=== Ransomware attack ===
In December 2024, Telecom Namibia was targeted by a ransomware attack from a group known as Hunters International, resulting in the leak of sensitive customer data, including information of ministries and senior officials.

== Subsidiaries & Brands ==
iWay – Acquired in 2000, provides web hosting, domain registration, email, and IT services.

PowerCom – Established in 2007, acquired by Telecom Namibia in 2013, provides telecommunications towers and infrastructure solutions to enhance coverage.

tn mobile – Mobile division, founded as Cell One (2007), renamed Leo (2009), incorporated as tn mobile in 2013; second-largest mobile operator in Namibia.
