= MTC Namibia =

Namibian telecommunications company

Mobile Telecommunications Limited
- Company type: Public
- Industry: Telecommunications
- Founded: 1995; 31 years ago
- Headquarters: Windhoek, Khomas Region, Namibia
- Area served: Namibia
- Key people: Licky Erastus (CEO); Theo Mberirua (chairperson of the board of directors)
- Products: GSM; GSM services Internet services
- Website: www.mtc.com.na

Mobile Telecommunications Limited (MTC) is a mobile telecommunications company and internet service provider in Namibia. It is the largest mobile carrier in Namibia with over two million active subscribers. MTC was established in 1995 and was the only cellular provider in Namibia at that time. Today, its competitors in Namibia are TN Mobile and Telecom Namibia.

Before Cell One and Telecom Switch entered the market, MTC had a monopoly on mobile telecommunications and 3G Internet access. MTC is still the most widely recognized mobile telecommunications company in Namibia. Its competitors are Telecom Namibia's TN Mobile and Paratus Telecom.

== Ownership ==
MTC was established as a joint venture between the Namibian government, Namibia Post and Telecommunications Holdings (NPTH), and Telia and Swedfund. In May 2004, NPTH concluded a deal that saw it hold 100% of the shares in MTC by acquiring the 49% held by Telia Overseas AB and Swedfund International AB. During 2006, the sale of 34% of MTC shares to Portugal Telecom was concluded for N$1.34 billion while the Namibian government retains the remainder of the stake through NPTH.

== Network ==
MTC launched Netman 3G on 23 June 2010 and on 16 May 2012, the company launched Netman 4G/LTE, making it the second mobile operator to provide 4G services in Africa. MTC Netman 4G provides download speeds of up to 100 Mbit/s. The company's 3G HSDPA+ Network allows for a download speed of up 7.2 Mbit/s in Namibia's major cities and towns. It further runs two modern mobile switching centers in Windhoek and Oshakati with the capacity to accommodate a rapidly rising number of customers of over 2 million active users.

MTC also operates the only full-service customer contact center in Namibia dealing with service queries ranging from telephony, SMS, fax, GPRS, data, voicemail, and 3G/HSDPA. A staff of 421 persons serves a diverse market of both pre-and postpaid subscribers.
