= Jung Joon-young discography =

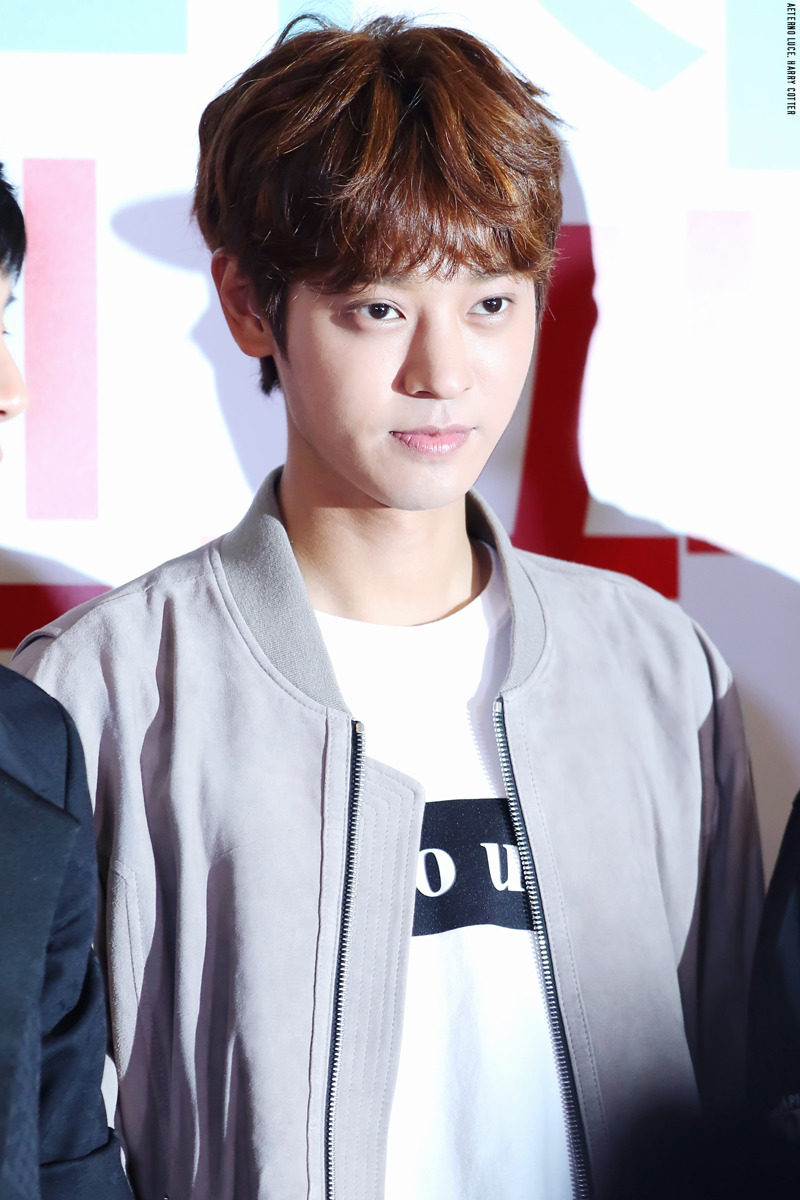
- Jung in May 2016
- Studio albums: 1
- EPs: 3
- Soundtrack albums: 10
- Singles: 20

The discography of South Korean singer Jung Joon-young consists of a studio album, three extended plays, and twenty singles.

== Studio albums ==
Title	Album details	Peak chart positions	Sales
Title	Album details	KOR	Sales
The First Person (1인칭)	Released: February 7, 2017; Label: C9 Entertainment, LOEN Entertainment; Formats: CD, digital download; Track listing: 1. "Intro"; 2. "Princess"; 3. "Me & You" (나와 너; feat. Jang Hye-jin); 4. "Artist" (화가); 5. "Star"; 6. "Amy"; 7. "Sympathy" (공감; orchestra ver.); 8. "Psycho"; 9. "Echo" (메아리; outro)	4	KOR: 5,327

== Extended plays ==
Title	EP details	Peak chart positions	Sales
Title	EP details	KOR	Sales
Rock Trip	Released: September 30, 2010; Label: Shinchon Music, Danal Entertainment; Formats: CD, digital download; Track listing: 1. "1,000miles (A Thousand Miles)"; 2. "Love N Hate"	—	—N/a
1st Mini Album	Released: October 10, 2013; Label: CJ E&M; Formats: CD, digital download; Track listing: 1. "Spotless Mind" (병이에요); 2. "Really?" (정말?); 3. "The Sense of an Ending" (이별10분전); 4. "Be Stupid"; 5. "Missed Call" (아는 번호); 6. "Take Off Mask"	5	KOR: 12,804
Teenager	Released: June 26, 2014; Label: CJ E&M; Formats: CD, digital download; Track listing: 1. "To Me" (내가 나에게); 2. "Teenager"; 3. "Lip Service" (이빨); 4. "Friends" (친구); 5. "Hold On"; 6. "Sailboat" (돛단배)	3	KOR: 13,383

== Single albums ==
Title	Album details	Peak chart positions	Sales
Title	Album details	KOR	Sales
Sympathy (공감)	Released: February 24, 2016; Label: C9 Entertainment, LOEN Entertainment; Formats: CD, digital download; Track listing: 1. "Sympathy" (공감; feat. Seo Young-eun); 2. "Amy"	6	KOR: 6,232
Fiancée	Released: March 29, 2018; Label: C9 Entertainment, LOEN Entertainment; Formats: CD, digital download; Track listing: 1. "Fiancée" (feat. Microdot); 2. "Fiancée" (instrumental)	12	KOR: 4,919

== Singles ==
Title	Year	Peak chart positions		Sales (DL)	Album
Title	Year	KOR	CHN V Chart	Sales (DL)	Album
Korean
"1,000miles (A Thousand Miles)"	2010	—	—N/a	—N/a	Rock Trip
"Fantasy" (환상)	2012	—	—N/a	—N/a	Non-album singles
"Happy Blue Christmas"	2012	—	—N/a	—N/a	Non-album singles
"Spotless Mind" (병이에요전)	2013	3	—N/a	KOR: 316,740	1st Mini Album
"The Sense of an Ending" (이별10분전)	2013	5	—N/a	KOR: 539,564	1st Mini Album
"Teenager"	2014	35	—N/a	KOR: 84,238	Teenager
"Sympathy" (공감) feat. Seo Young-eun	2016	25	—N/a	KOR: 855,761	Sympathy (공감)
"Me & You" (나와 너) feat. Jang Hye-jin	2017	31	—N/a	KOR: 72,497	The First Person (1인칭)
"Fiancée" (피앙세) feat. Microdot	2018	— (Note: "Fiancee" did not enter the Gaon Digital Chart, but appeared at no. 100 on the component Download chart.)	—N/a	—N/a	Fiancée
Chinese
"Original Love" (還原的愛情)	2017	—N/a	28	—N/a	Non-album single

== Soundtrack appearances ==
Title	Year	Peak chart positions	Sales (DL)	Album
Title	Year	KOR	Sales (DL)	Album
"I'm Nobody" (하루만)	2014	33	KOR: 92,293	Pretty Man OST
"Same Place" (같은 자리)	2014	—	—N/a	Modern Farmer OST
"Show Time"	2014	—	—N/a	Blade & Soul: Warlock Theme song
"Come to My Dream"	2015	—	—N/a	Pokémon the Movie: Hoopa and the Clash of Ages OST
"I Love You"	2016	53	KOR: 31,804	Two Yoo Project Sugar Man OST
"Spring, Memory" (봄, 추억)	2016	—	—N/a	Memory OST
"Where Are You" (내가 너에게 가던 네가 나에게 오던)	2016	67	KOR: 135,747	W – Two Worlds OST
"Opening Theme Song"	2017	—	—N/a	The Hounted House
"Stay"	2017	—	—N/a	The King Loves OST
"Everyday" (매일)	2017	—	—N/a	Andante OST

== Collaborations ==
Title	Year	Peak chart positions	Sales (DL)	Album
Title	Year	KOR	Sales (DL)	Album
"Just the Way You Are" (달리함께) with Younha	2014	21	KOR: 197,524	Non-album singles
"Aewol" (애월) Jonghyun	2015	—	—N/a	Non-album singles
"Fly" (날아) DJ Advanced	2018	—	—N/a	Non-album singles
"You" (너) Mircrodot	2018	—	—N/a	Non-album single
"—" denotes releases that did not chart or were not released in that region.

== Other appearances ==
Title	Year	Peak chart positions	Sales (DL)	Album
Title	Year	KOR	Sales (DL)	Album
"Waiting Everyday" (매일 매일 기다려)	2012	22	KOR: 201,478	Superstar K4
"Becoming Dust" (먼지가 되어) with Roy Kim	2012	1	KOR: 1,986,215	Superstar K4
"Bed of Roses"	2012	77	KOR: 58,771	Superstar K4
"It's Only My World" (그것만이 내 세상)	2012	63	KOR: 73,606	Superstar K4
"Outsider" (아웃사이더)	2012	43	KOR: 152,447	Superstar K4
"Emergency Room" (응급실)	2012	4	KOR: 653,031	Superstar K4
"Did You Forget" (잊었니)	2012	25	KOR: 186,321	Superstar K4
"Creep" with Roy Kim	2012	73	KOR: 50,985	Superstar K4

== See also ==
- Drug Restaurant discography
