= First Mini Album =

First Mini Album may refer to:

- 1st Mini Album (Jung Joon-young EP)
- 1st Mini Album (Taegoon EP)
- 1st Mini Album (2NE1 EP)
- The First Mini Album (Orange Caramel EP)
- The 1st Mini Album (Strawberry Milk EP)
