= Jung Joon-young KakaoTalk chatrooms =

South Korean entertainment scandal

- Part of the Burning Sun scandal
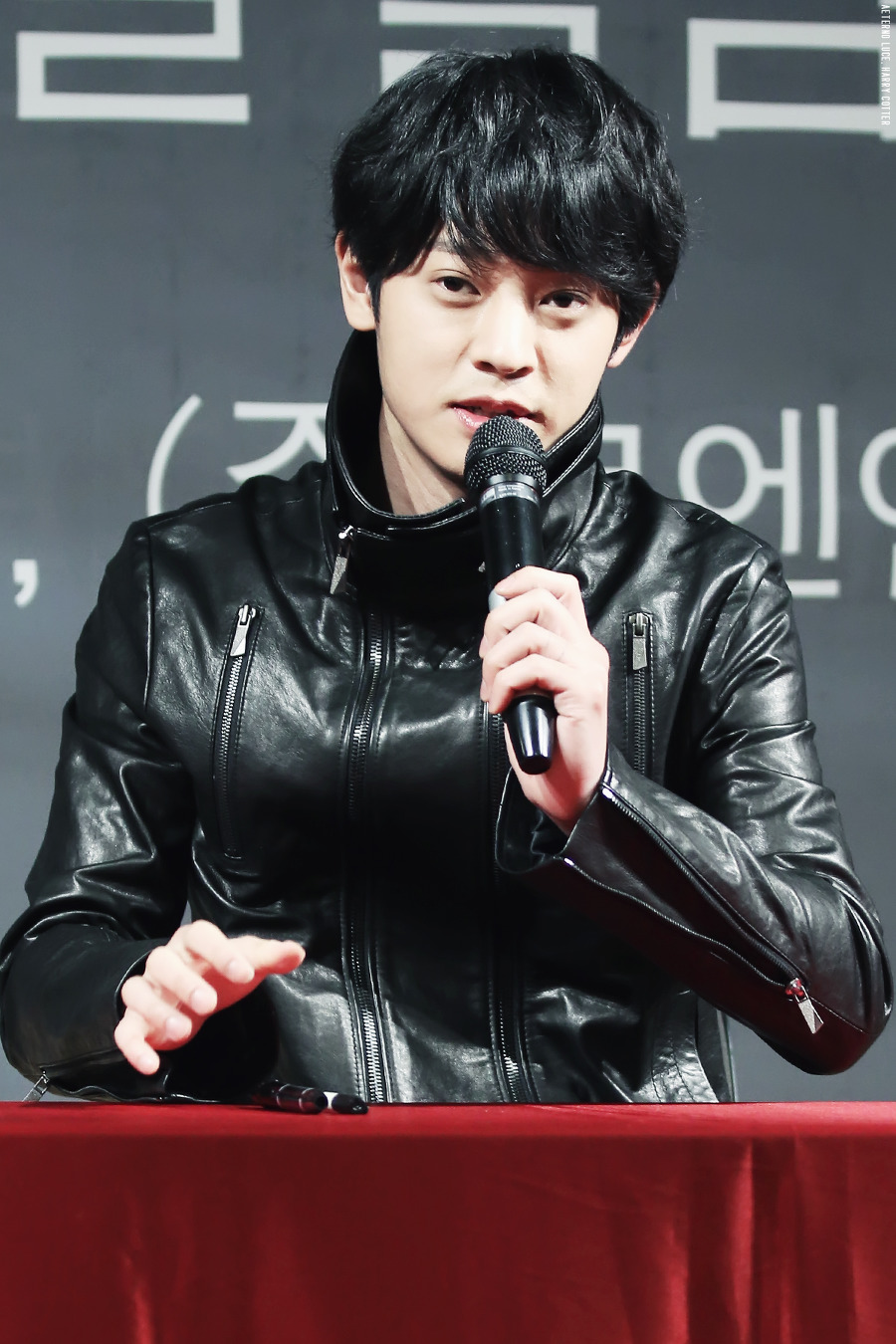
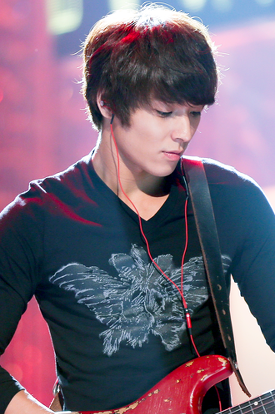
- Jung Joon-young (photographed in 2016) and Choi Jong-hoon (in 2012), were sentenced for rape.
- Native name: 정준영 등 불법 촬영물 제작 및 유포 사건
- Date: November 2015 – June 2016
- Location: South Korea
- Type: Entertainment and sex scandal
- First reporter: Bang Jung-hyun
- Convicted: Jung Joon-young; Choi Jong-hoon; Former Burning Sun MD Kim; Businessman Kwon; Former YG Entertainment director Heo; Seungri (illicit sharing only)
- Charges: Gang rape, illicit filming and sharing

The Jung Joon-young KakaoTalk chatrooms was a South Korean entertainment and sex scandal publicized in 2019 as part of the Burning Sun scandal. The two scandals were tied together by the release of revealing KakaoTalk messages that exposed alleged crimes at the Burning Sun nightclub, and separately, by K-pop singer and entertainer Jung Joon-young and his friends and colleagues.

Leaked KakaoTalk messages from Jung's phone revealed conversations and videos dating from 2015 to 2016, which were used in a police investigation that resulted in gang rape convictions (two victims, separate dates) of Jung and four other chatroom members: a former member of F.T. Island, Choi Jong-hoon; a former Burning Sun employee named Kim; a businessman named Kwon; and a former employee of YG Entertainment named Heo. Jung's conviction included charges for eleven instances of illegal filming and sharing. Big Bang singer Seungri, around whom the Burning Sun scandal centered, was charged, at the same time as Jung and Choi, with sharing illegal photos in Jung's chatrooms. He was subsequently found guilty on nine charges in the Burning Sun scandal, one of which was three instances of sharing illegal photos via a mobile chatroom.

During the course of the investigation, other charges were made against solo singers Roy Kim and Eddy Kim for allegations of sharing illicit photographs in Jung's chatrooms. Both of their cases were eventually dropped after it was determined that, while they each shared one photo they found online, they did not create illicit content or participate in the chatroom where Jung shared illicit content.

Other entertainers were affected by the leaked KakaoTalk messages. Singer Yong Jun-hyung left the boyband Highlight after he admitted to viewing a video Jung had filmed with consent in a bar but shared without consent. Lee Jong-hyun of rock band CNBLUE also admitted to viewing Jung's videos and allegedly asked Jung to get him a woman to have sex with; Lee later quit CNBLUE. Actor Cha Tae-hyun and comedian Kim Jun-ho both temporarily suspended their entertainment industry activities after the chatrooms revealed they allegedly gambled illegally.

The allegations of sex crimes involved added to the South Korea's "epidemic" of what is called molka, a Korean word for the online distribution of nonconsensual sex videos taken of women.

== Development ==
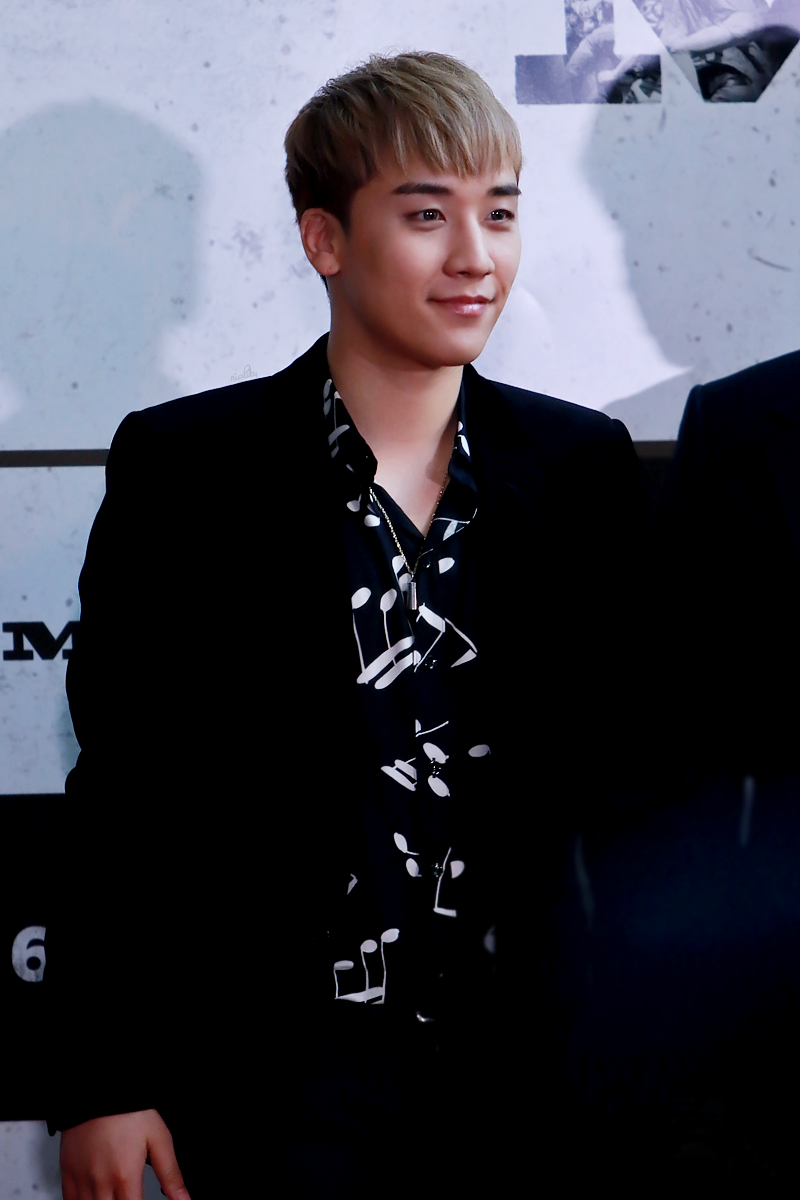
Seungri, 2016

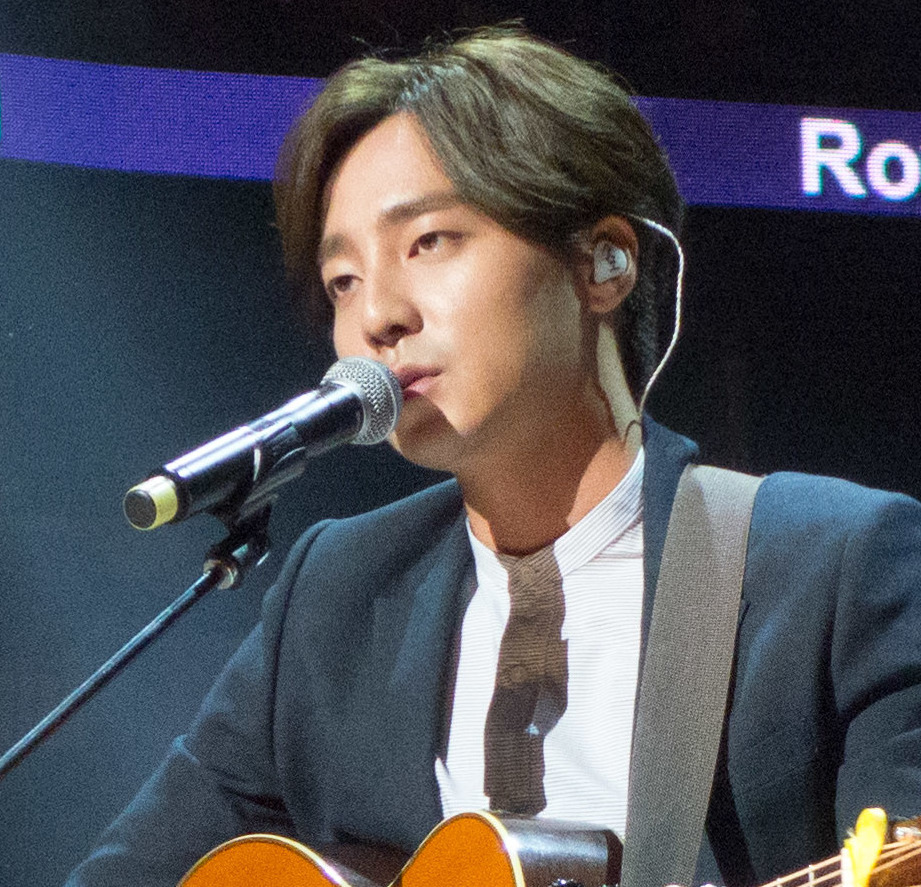
Roy Kim, 2015

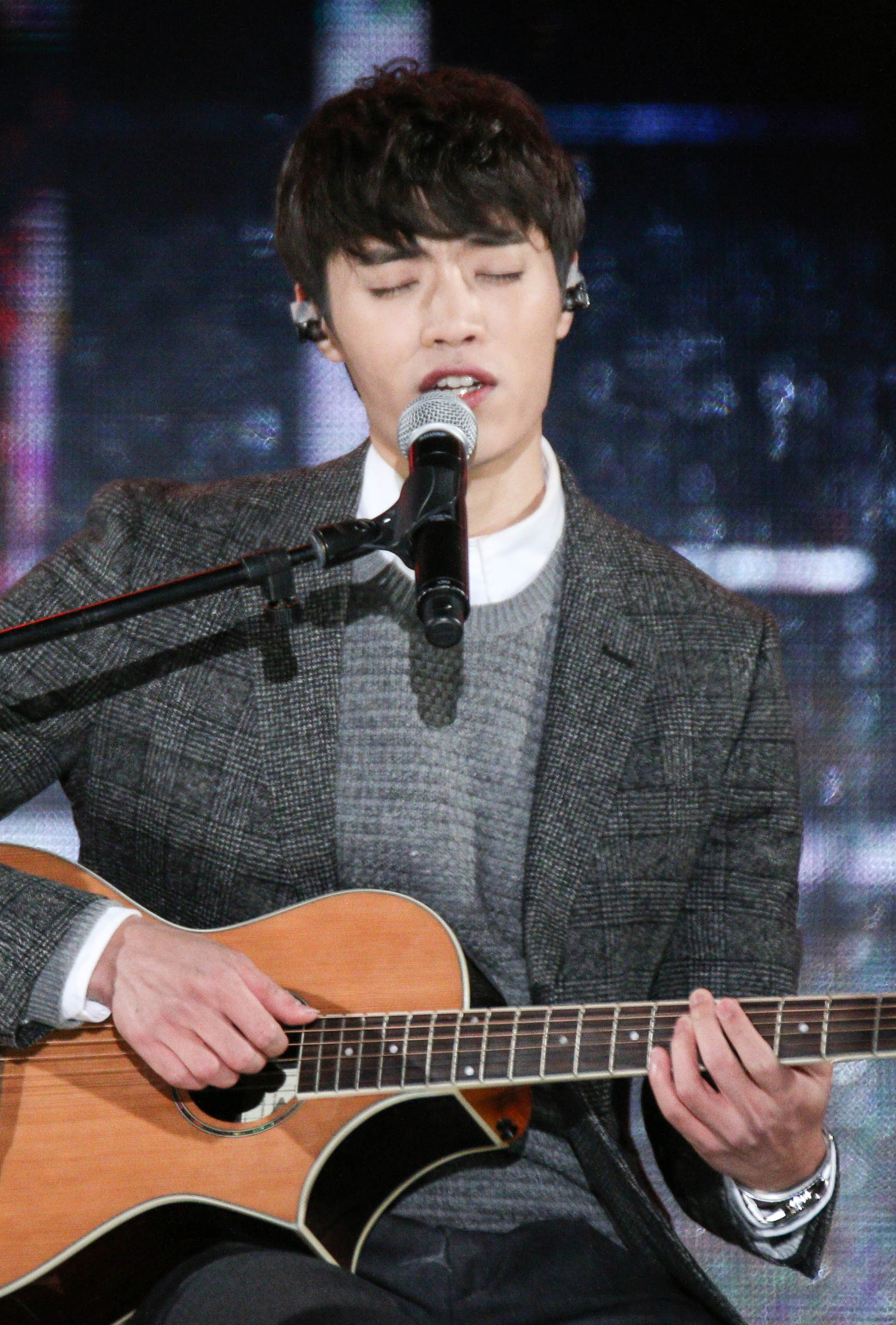
Eddy Kim, 2014

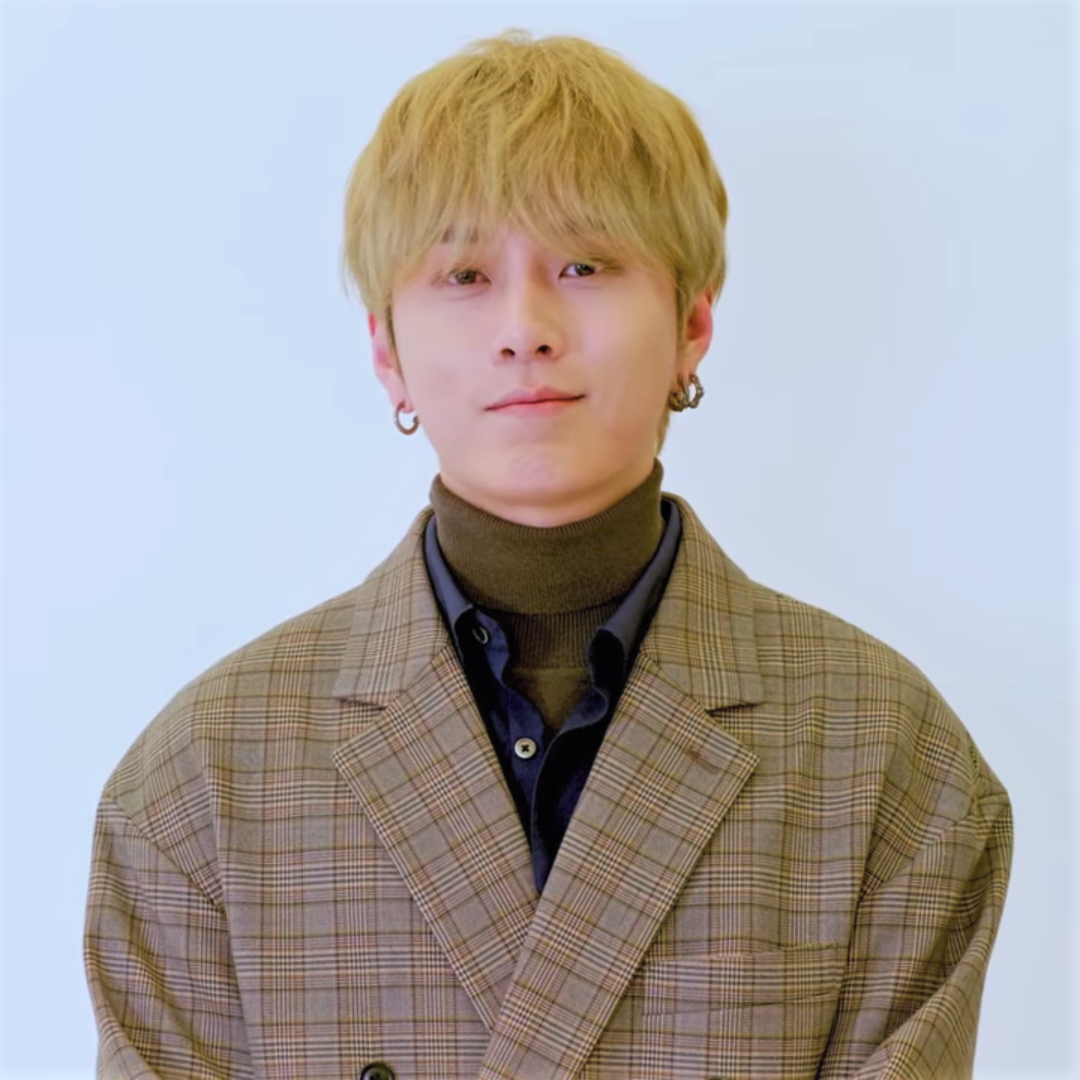
Yong Jun-hyung, 2017

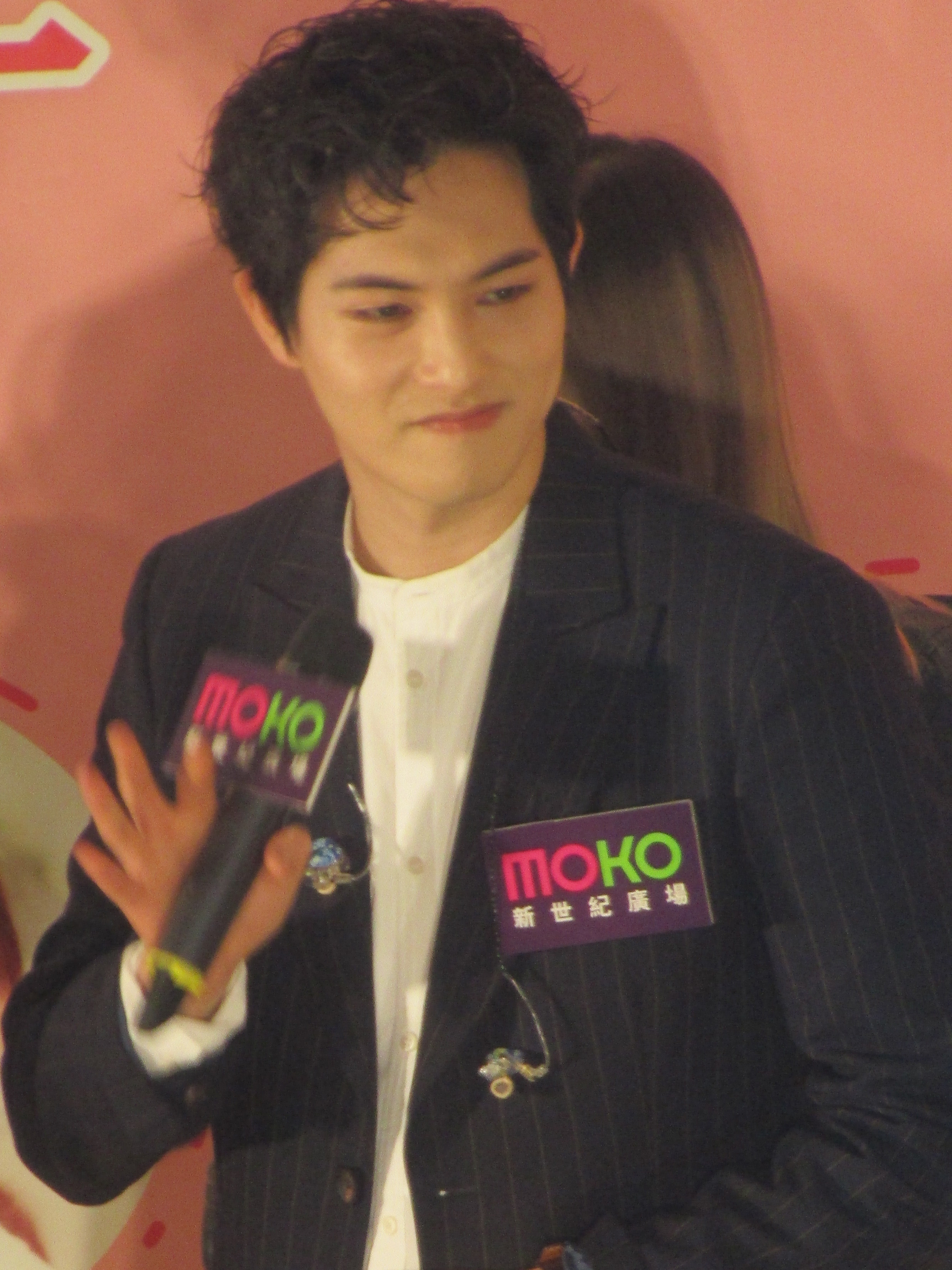
Lee Jong-hyun, 2017

Other entertainers involved in and affected by the scandal

=== Background ===
South Korean singer-songwriter and television personality Jung Joon-young began his entertainment career in 2012 as a contestant on the audition show Superstar K 4, in which he placed third. While filming the show, he met fellow contestants Roy Kim and Eddy Kim, both solo singer-songwriters. Jung later met Big Bang member Seungri at an awards show.

In 2016, an ex-girlfriend filed criminal charges against Jung, claiming he filmed them having sex without her consent. She later withdrew the charges. During this period, Jung dropped out of the television show 2 Days & 1 Night, but returned after three months. In 2017, a JoongAng Ilbo analysis noted that Jung's quick return to show business after his 2016 sex scandal showed the public was becoming more tolerant of the "private lives of celebrities".

=== February 26, 2019: First set of KakaoTalk messages released ===
On February 26, 2019, cable TV channel SBS funE published KakaoTalk messages they received from an unnamed source. The messages, which would become part of the Burning Sun scandal, appeared to show Seungri directing staff at a nightclub he owned to bring prostitutes for the club's clients.

=== March 11, 2019: Second set of KakaoTalk messages and source revealed ===
The SBS Eight O'Clock News revealed that the source of the KakaoTalk messages was a lawyer named Bang Jung-hyun, who was interviewed by the news program on March 11, 2019. Bang said he obtained the messages from a whistleblower who was a technician at a phone repair shop where Jung had dropped his phone off for repairs. The whistleblower had sent an email to Bang that contained thousands of messages taken from Jung's phone from a period of eight months in 2015 and 2016. The messages appeared to include Jung, Seungri, and other male celebrities. Bang said of the chats, "Their conversations showed that there were not only sex crimes by celebrities, but also a cozy relationship between them and top police officers." Bang told SBS he had forwarded the messages to the Anti-Corruption and Civil Rights Commission in February. SBS reported that the messages could not have been manipulated because a tamper-proof device called a hash-code verification was embedded in them; the messages could therefore stand as circumstantial evidence to seek more evidence, SBS reported.

Media outlets, including The Korea Times, later translated the messages into English. In one conversation, dated January 1, 2016, Jung allegedly typed in a group chat, "Let's all get together online, hit the strip bar and rape them in the car", to which another member of the group chat, identified only as "Park", responded, "Our lives are like a movie. We have done so many things that could put us in jail. We just haven't killed anyone." Another group chat, dated April 17, 2016, allegedly shows Jung responding to a conversation with two people identified only as "Kim 1" and "Choi":

English translation

Kim 1: Anybody want porn?

Choi: Me.

Kim 1: (Kim sends the video)

Choi: Wait, she is fainted.

Kim 1: So what?

Choi: I want to see her alive (in the video).

Kim 1: Then I couldn't have turned on the flash.

Jung: You raped her. (Laughs)

— Translated reconstruction of the KakaoTalk chats released by The Korea Times on March 14, 2019.
Translation:
original Korean

김00: 야동 볼 사람?

최00: 나

김00: (Kim sends the video)

최00: 뭐야 기절이잖아

김00: 기절이면 어쩌라고

최00: 살아있는 여자(영상)을 보내줘

김00: 기절이니까 플래시 켜고 찍은 거지

정준영: 강간했네ㅋㅋ

— Original chat revealed by SBS Eight O'Clock News on March 12, 2019.

=== March 12–16, 2019: Police question Jung and other entertainers retire ===
Jung, who was in Los Angeles filming a television show, returned to Seoul on March 12, where he was booked as a suspect on charges of illegal hidden camera filming and sharing and accused of taping ten or more women. Later that day, Jung released a statement saying, "I admit to all my crimes", and resigned from all his entertainment work a day following Seungri's resignation. Jung said, "I filmed women without their consent and shared it in a chatroom, and while I was doing so I didn't feel a great sense of guilt", and apologized to his victims.

On March 13, SBS reported allegations that police had tampered with evidence in Jung's 2016 sex scandal.

Jung and Seungri were both called into the Seoul Metropolitan Police Agency (SMPA) on March 14, with more than 100 journalists gathered outside. Jung apologized before entering the station for questioning, followed by Seungri later that day. Seungri exited first at around 6:15 a.m. on March 15, and Jung exited around an hour later, following 21 hours of questioning. Jung told reporters he had handed in his "golden phone", a nickname for his second mobile phone that reporters had speculated may be where Jung stored his illegal videos.

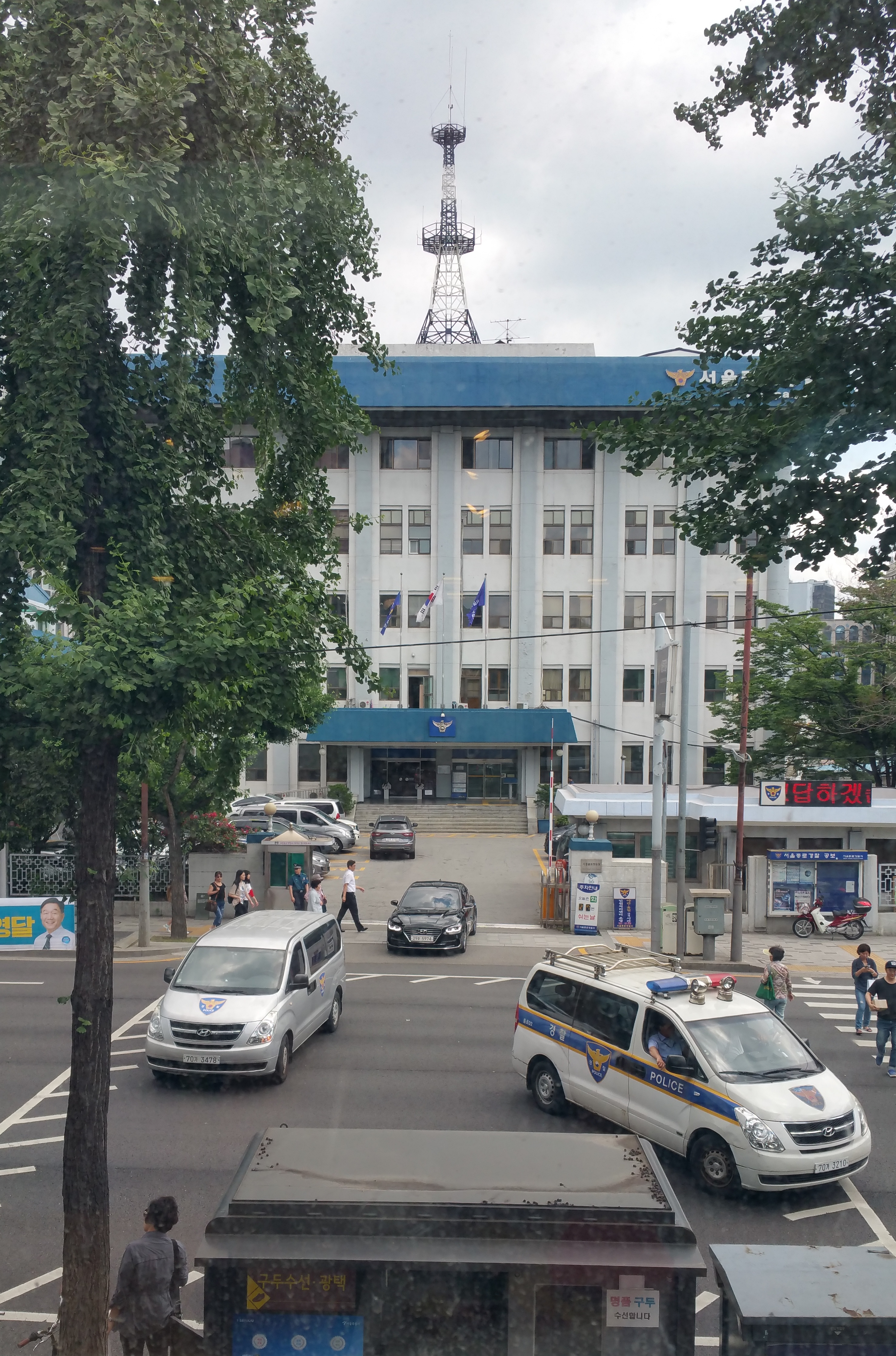
SMPA Jongno Police Station where Jung was taken after March 21, 2019, arrest

Meanwhile, on March 14, two more singers, Yong Jun-hyung of the boy band Highlight and Choi Jong-hoon of the band F.T. Island, announced their retirement from their respective music groups following speculation that they were participants in Jung's chatrooms. Yong admitted to viewing a video that was filmed with consent, however was sent to him without consent and participating in "inappropriate conversations" about it, saying, "All these behaviours were extremely unethical, and I was stupid". Yong was questioned by police as a witness. Choi had been a member of one of the chatrooms that was of immediate interest in media reports and the investigation. In one conversation, Choi allegedly detailed his own drunk driving incident from 2016, that was allegedly kept out of media coverage due to help from a police official with the surname Yoon. Choi was questioned by police on March 16 under allegations of secretly filming and sharing videos.

On March 15, another Korean idol, Lee Jong-hyun of rock band CNBLUE, admitted to viewing Jung's sex videos in a group chatroom and making disparaging remarks about women, talking about them as sexual objects. The admission followed a prior denial on his part and an SBS report of an alleged KakaoTalk conversation he had with Jung, during which Lee asked for "young", "pretty" and "kind" women he could have sex with, and to which Jung responded, "Who do you want?" Lee left CNBlue in August after a female YouTuber revealed private messages he sent her, "drawing new attention to his inappropriate interactions with and about women", Billboard reported.

Other celebrities affected by the scandal were actor Cha Tae-hyun and comedian Kim Jun-ho, Jung's fellow cast members on 2 Days & 1 Night, who suspended all of their entertainment industry activities on March 16 after the chatroom conversations revealed they allegedly gambled large amounts of money while playing golf overseas.

=== March 21, 2019: Jung Joon-young arrested ===
Jung was arrested on March 21 for charges under the Act on Special Cases Concerning the Punishment, etc. of Sexual Crimes. He was charged with crimes against at least ten victims for illegally filming and distributing sex tapes. Jung admitted to the charges and apologized at the hearing for his arrest at the Seoul Central District Court, and was later taken to the SMPA's Jongno Police Station. On March 29, he was transferred from the police station again to the prosecution for referral of an indictment, and he was indicted on April 17.

=== April 2–10, 2019: Third set of KakaoTalk messages revealed and more entertainers involved ===
On April 2, 2019, the SMPA issued a summons for singer-songwriter Roy Kim, who they said appeared in the illegal chatroom with Jung, Seungri and Choi, and booked him the following day for distributing an obscene photo in the chatroom, which he denied taking himself, and which investigators agreed was likely the case. Roy Kim's agency coordinated his return to South Korea from the United States where he was attending school, and he was questioned by police on April 10.

On April 3, Label SJ, the agency for Kangin of boy band Super Junior, released a statement admitting that Kangin had been a member of Jung's chatroom while the two worked together on the television show Hitmaker three years prior and denied any illegal activity on Kangin's part. On April 4, police said that Kangin, Jeong Jin-woon of boy band 2AM, and model Lee Cheol-woo were members of the chatrooms, but they had no plans to question them yet.

On April 5, singer-songwriter Eddy Kim was booked for circulating one or more illegally taken photographs from the chatrooms.

An early April police tally stated that seven chatroom members had been booked for disseminating spy camera content; and there were a total of 23 different groups or one-on-one chatrooms, with sixteen participants. Included in the bookings and instances of occurrences were: Jung, 13; Choi, 3; and Seungri, 1. Two arrests included Jung and a former Burning Sun employee, surnamed Kim, including a probe of five others.

=== April 19, 2019 – end of year: First victim files police complaint, arrests and trial ===
Most of the victims were very young women in their early twenties. They didn't even know they had been filmed, that the videos were being circulated in group chats. Some of them begged, "Please save me. How do I live after this?"

— SBS reporter Kang Kyung-yoon in The Washington Post

On April 19, 2019, the first victim complaint against chatroom members was filed against Jung, Choi and three others: former employees of the Burning Sun and YG Entertainment, and an anonymous businessman. The complainant alleged that, after passing out, she had been raped in a Daegu hotel room in March 2016, in an incident that was filmed by the group. The victim's complaint followed an April 11 interview of Bang on JTBC's Lee Gyu-yeon's Spotlight, where he reported there were about ten photos and videos from the chatrooms that showed forced sexual assaults, sometimes by multiple members of the chat group. Bang had met with some of the women from the videos, who were unaware of what had happened to them, perhaps due to having been drugged. On April 23, the SMPA began an investigation into the complainant's allegations, which reportedly occurred after a fan signing event for Jung; and a second similar rape case at a resort in Hongcheon in January 2016, where another alleged victim traveled with Jung and Choi. The SMPA said they were aware of group rape after examining the videos, but had not been able to identify the victims until they came forward. The cases were assigned to the SMPA's Women and Juvenile Affairs Division, who have expertise in crimes against women, including sexual assault.

Choi was arrested on May 9 for allegations of group sexual assault with four members of Jung's chat group in March 2016; after appearing at a hearing with two others and denying the charges against him. Another male, surname Kwon, was also arrested; with both Choi and Kwon charged under the Act on Special Cases Concerning the Punishment, etc. of Sexual Crimes. Jung, who was still under police custody, pled guilty to eleven cases of the illicit filming and sharing at a May 10 pretrial hearing, where he offered to settle with the victims. He was being investigated separately in the group rape case, where he, like Choi, denied allegations. On May 17, the SMPA referred the gang rape case to prosecutors, recommending indictments on charges of special rape. On June 5, after indictments, the Seoul Central District Court merged the trials for the five previously accused, Jung, Choi, Kwon, a Burning Sun MD named Kim, and an entertainment director named Heo, to include two charges of group rapes of the two victims in 2016. The five appeared at a June 27 hearing and denied the rape charges. At the first trial hearing on July 16, which included the illegal filming and sharing and rape charges, Jung and Kwon admitted to having sex but denied rape, and Choi denied having sex. Jung's lawyer submitted a statement contesting the legality of evidence obtained from the KakaoTalk messages in violation of the Personal Information Protection Act. The court specified five victims, two reference witnesses, a time period for the alleged illegal photography from November 2015 to June 2016, the dates of the alleged rapes on January 9 and March 20, 2016, and the need for confidentiality of the victims. The next trial dates, on August 19, August 26, September 2, September 16, September 23, October 7 and October 21 were closed to the public. At the ninth trial date on November 13, prosecutors recommended prison sentences on the rape charges for all five men. The defendants and number of years respectively were: Jung, 7; Choi, 5; Kwon, 10; Kim, 10; and Heo, 5. Jung's charges included the illicit filming and sharing. Prosecutors also asked that all five be restricted from working with minors for 10 years, be required to disclose personal information, and undergo sexual violence treatment programs. Another trial date was held on November 27.

On November 29, the court sentenced Jung to six years in prison and Choi to five, and both were sentenced to complete 80 hours of sexual assault treatment and a five-year restriction on working with minors. The judge said "the defendants treated the women as simple instruments of sexual pleasure", "committing crimes of gang rape and sexual assault" and "sharing their acts in a chatroom with acquaintances", and said the "damage to the victims could not be recovered". The other three defendants were also sentenced, with Kim receiving a five-year prison sentence, Kwon a four-year prison sentence, and Heo a suspended sentence with two years' probation and 160 hours of community service. By December 6, Jung, Choi and Kim had submitted appeals to the court for their convictions.

=== January 2020 – end of year: Additional indictments, trial appealed; Roy Kim and Eddy Kim cases dropped ===
On January 30, 2020, Jung and Choi were indicted by prosecutors on more charges, along with nine others in the Burning Sun case, Jung for allegations of soliciting prostitution and Choi for bribing a police officer during his drunk driving incident in February 2016. On February 4, the first trial hearing for an appeal of the November 29 rape convictions by all five defendants was held. At the March 18 trial for Choi for additional charges, he admitted to illegal filming and sharing in the KakaoTalk chatrooms, but denied the 2016 police bribery charge. Prosecutors proposed an additional one-year and a half sentencing on top of his prior rape conviction sentence, if convicted.

Agencies for Roy Kim and Eddy Kim released statements on February 25 and March 6, respectively, that their indictments had been suspended from prosecution due to each singer having uploaded only one image that was captured online, and had belonged to a "hobby chatroom" with Jung Joon-young, not the more questionable one.

On April 3, Jung and Burning Sun employee Kim were fined one million won and two million won, respectively, in a summary judgment for the prostitution charges, along with judgments for two others in the Burning Sun case.

On May 12, an appellate court reduced the prison sentences for three of the defendants: Jung's to five years from six, Choi's to two-and-a-half years from five, and Kim's to four years from five. Sentences for the other two defendants, Kwon's four years in prison and Heo's two years' probation, remained the same as the first trial. Jung had submitted documents attesting to his regret, and Choi and Kim had settled with one of the victims, accounting for the sentence reductions. Jung and Choi were additionally denied probation, mandated to attend treatment programs and restricted from working with children and teens. Jung and Choi submitted appeals to the Supreme Court of South Korea on May 13 and May 18, respectively, and on September 24, the sentences for Jung (five years) and Choi (two-and-a-half years) were upheld.

=== January 2021 – present: Seungri's trial concludes ===
On August 12, Seungri was sentenced by a military court to a three-year prison term on nine charges related to the Burning Sun scandal, one of which was a "violation of the Act on Special Cases Concerning The Punishment, Etc. of Sexual Crimes" or his distribution of three nude photos of women via a mobile chatroom. As part of the sentencing, his personal information was reported to the government's sex crimes' registry, with employment restrictions.

Seungri's case concluded in a military appeals court in January 2022, with a reduced prison sentence of a year and a half and a fine, based on an admission of guilt and "reflection" on all nine charges.

== Investigative reporting ==
The SBS investigative reporter who examined the KakaoTalk chat messages sent by the whistleblower to the television station SBS funE was Kang Kyung-yoon. When she started interviewing some of the victims of the videos, she found they did not know of their existence. She said, "Some of them begged, 'Please save me. How do I live after this?'" She said they were ashamed and angry but feared "wearing a scarlet letter as a sex crime victim", and thus feared being identified. Kang said that the sex video investigation was seen by some people as a means to avert attention away from the larger corruption scandal with its multiple allegations, but she perceived it as a serious social issue that needed reporting on. On November 25, 2019, following the suicide of idol Goo Hara, Kang said that Goo, who had undergone public harassment over a sex video that was threatened to be shared by her ex-boyfriend, had contacted her to offer support. It was later revealed that Goo had a pivotal role in revealing the identity of Yoon Gyu-geun, the Seoul Metropolitan Police Agency officer to whom the member of chatrooms referred to as a "police chief" that "watched their backs". Goo was a friend of Choi and convinced him to reveal Yoon's identity to Kang.

== Investigation summary ==
Jung was investigated and arrested for allegations of illegal hidden camera filming and distributing, and on May 10 conceded to the charges, at the first hearing for his trial. He was subsequently indicted in January 2020 for soliciting prostitution. Jung, Choi Jong-hoon and three others were arrested and charged with group sexual assault. Choi was also indicted for the attempted bribery of a police officer in 2016 to cover up a case of driving under the influence (although an initial police investigation was dropped), and for illegal hidden camera filming and distribution. Seungri, Roy Kim and Eddy Kim were investigated for allegations of sharing, individually, one illicit photograph in Jung's chatrooms.

== Effects on entertainment industry ==
Months after the scandal started, music artists denied involvement. In late September, Jeong Jin-woon of 2AM, reported in April to have been a member of one of Jung's chatrooms, released a statement that he was not involved in the illegal chatrooms. Also in late September, rapper Zico, who had mentioned Jung's "golden phone" on a television program in 2016, and was rumored to have seen the illegal videos, released lyrics in a song on his new album referring to it, "I've never seen a video like that, I swear to God." At the same time, music site Melon had to explain a banner, recommending a Jung Joon-young album to users, that popped up due to an automated system.

== Public response ==
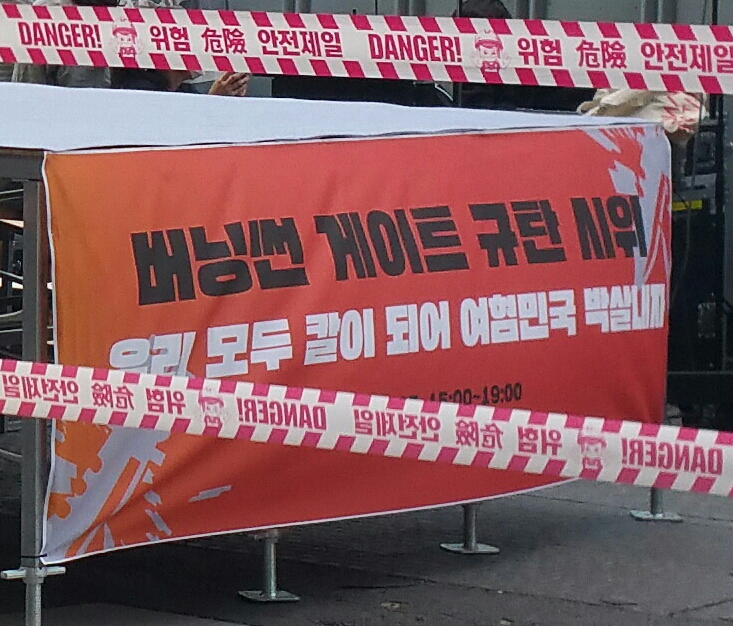
Protest rally, Sinnonhyeon Station Exit 6, (Le Méridien Hotel), Gangnam, May 25, 2019

Public protests, led by women's and civic groups, directed towards the Burning Sun scandal and Jung Joon-young's sex-video chatrooms started in March and continued throughout the year.

A representative for the Korean Cyber Sexual Violence Response Center (KCSVRC), a Seoul activist group that provides legal advice to victims of hidden-camera related crimes, said there are a lot of "Jung Joon-youngs" in society, and if the scandal had not involved a celebrity, it would have been uneventful. They said they hoped the anger it had generated would bring a change in the way such cases were looked at and punished; saying that a real change has to come from within a male society that it is not right to share or watch the videos. The House of Sharing, a support group for comfort women, responded to language revealed in Jung's chatroom conversations, where the women, in sexual contexts, were said to be "like comfort women". The president, Ahn Shin-kwon said, "We cannot hide our anger toward them for using such words to disparage women. It is disappointing to see such appalling historical knowledge from celebrities, who have a lot of influence over the public."

North Korean fans of the TV show 2 Days & 1 Night, which had starred Jung and two more celebrities who quit, were disappointed it was off-air, many of them not aware it had halted productions due to the scandal. It had been one of their favorite South Korean programs since the early 2010s, of analog television viewers in Pyongsong, Nampo, Pyongyang and places closer to the border, and for others through USB sticks and DVDs. The show went on hiatus for nine months after public criticism of the show's "chronic moral hazard problems". Viewers accused the show of leniency in the handling of Jung's prior public 2016 case of filming his girlfriend, after they allowed him to return to the show after a short absence; and were critical that the production crew had been a part of the group chat that was aware of Cha Tae-hyun's and Kim Jun-ho's gambling issues.

Jung's distribution of sex videos was one of the top gender issues talked about on online platforms in South Korea for the first half of 2019, with research showing a growing trend of gender based topics, most in a negative context. Google Korea's 2019 most popular domestic searched terms included Jung Joon-young ranked at number two over-all, and number one for top public figure; with Burning Sun ranked at number three for domestic news and issues.
