= Eddy Kim =

South Korean musician (born 1990)

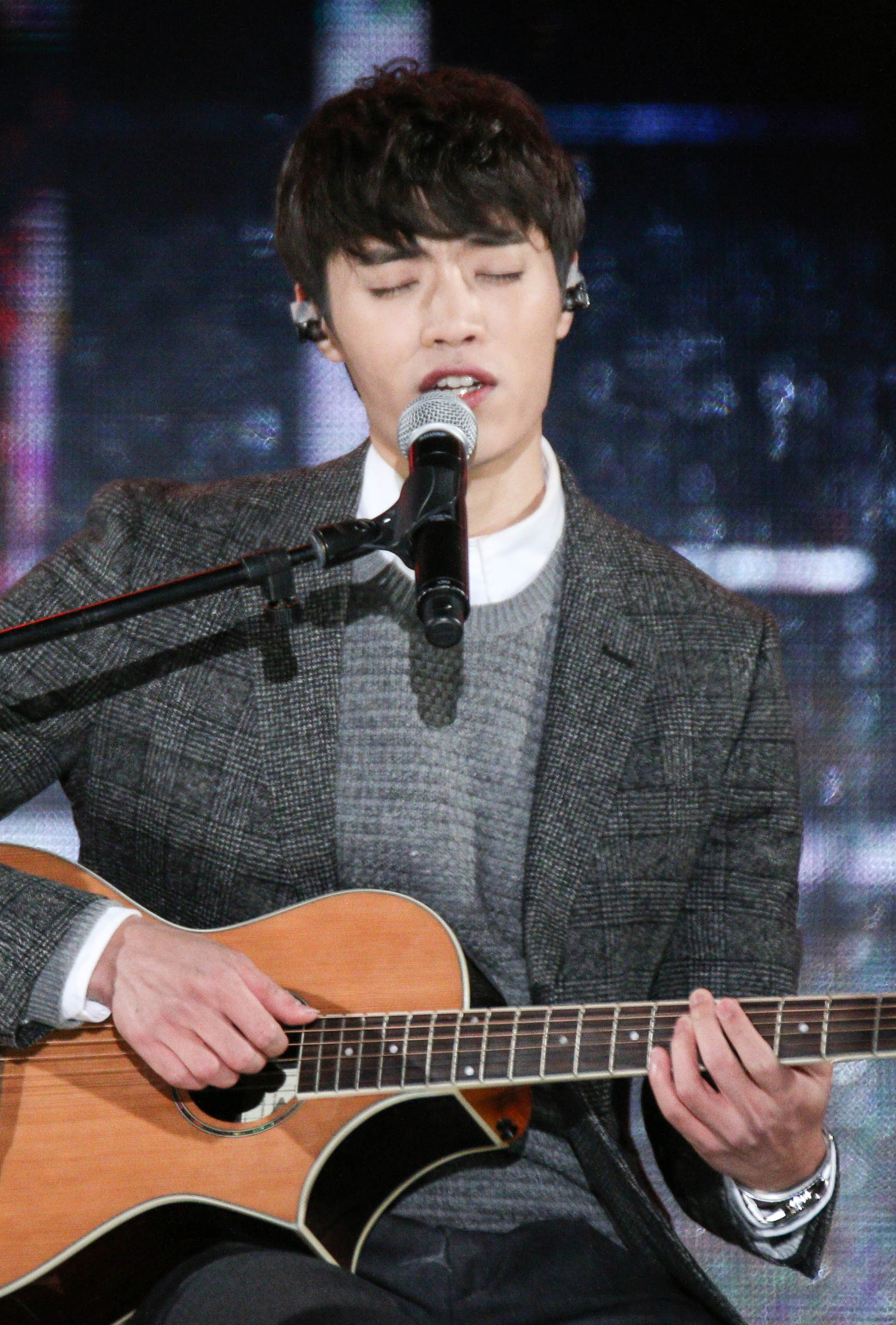
- Kim in 2014

Background information
- Born: Kim Jung-hwan; November 23, 1990 (age 35); Seoul, South Korea
- Genres: K-pop
- Occupations: Singer; songwriter; guitarist
- Years active: 2014–present
- Label: Mystic Story

Korean name
- Hangul: 김정환
- RR: Gim Jeonghwan
- MR: Kim Chŏnghwan

Kim Jung-hwan (Korean: 김정환; born November 23, 1990), known professionally as Eddy Kim (에디 킴), is a South Korean singer, songwriter, and guitarist. He rose to fame as a contestant on the television talent show Superstar K 4 in 2012. He released his first EP, The Manual, in 2014.

On April 5, 2019, Kim was booked by the police for circulating illegally taken pictures of women in the Jung Joon-young KakaoTalk chatrooms, a mobile chat with fellow celebrities in 2016; a police investigation is ongoing into the Burning Sun scandal. On April 11, 2019, he admitted to spreading hidden camera photos taken without consent which he had downloaded from the internet.

== Discography ==
=== Extended plays ===
Title	Album details	Peak chart positions	Sales
Title	Album details	KOR	Sales
The Manual	Released: April 11, 2014; Label: Mystic89, CJ E&M; Format: CD, digital download; Track listing: 1. 2 Years Apart; 2. 밀당의 고수; 3. Slow Dance; 4. 너 사용법; 5. Sober Up; 6. It's Over	—	—N/a
Sing Sing Sing	Released: January 21, 2015; Label: Mystic89, CJ E&M; Format: CD, digital download; Track listing: 1. Sing Sing Sing; 2. My Love; 3. Apologize; 4. Shower Girl; 5. Lovin' You; 6. 조화 (造花)	—	—N/a
"—" denotes releases that did not chart.

=== Singles ===
Title	Year	Peak chart positions		Sales (DL)	Album
Title	Year	KOR	KOR Hot 100	Sales (DL)	Album
As lead artist
"2 Years Apart"	2014	22	23	KOR: 145,123+	The Manual
"The Manual" (너 사용법)	2014	7	12	KOR: 1,585,680+	The Manual
"Darling"	2014	34	—N/a	KOR: 94,505+	The Manual Deluxe Edition
"Apologize"	2015	39	—N/a	KOR: 23,803+	Sing Sing Sing
"My Love"	2015	12	—N/a	KOR: 206,075+	Sing Sing Sing
"Paldangdam" (팔당댐) feat. Beenzino	2016	14	—N/a	KOR: 327,098+	Non-album single
"Sweet Kiss Like Coffee" (내 입술 따뜻한 커피처럼) feat. Lee Sung-kyung	2016	3	—N/a	KOR: 840,353+	Non-album single
"Heart Pound" (쿵쾅대) feat. Angelina Danilova	2017	96		KOR: 41,736+	Non-album single
"Now" (이제는)	2017	—		KOR:	Non-album single
"Bet On Me"	2017	—		KOR:	Non-album single
"Poom" (품)	2017	—		KOR:	Non-album single
Collaborations
"Coffee & Tea" with Solar	2015	23	—N/a	KOR: 65,210+	Dokkun Project Pt.4
As featured artist
"I Smell Autumn" Verbal Jint feat. Eddy Kim	2014	17	—N/a	KOR: 128,816+	Non-album single
"Double Jack" BoA feat. Eddy Kim	2015	43	—N/a	KOR: 24,209+	Kiss My Lips
"Lonely" Kanto feat. Eddy Kim	2016	—	—N/a	—N/a	14216
"Dear" Mia feat. Eddy Kim	2018	—	—N/a	—N/a	Non-album single
Soundtrack appearances
"One Day" (하루 하나)	2014	—	—N/a	—N/a	Pride and Prejudice OST
"Roommate" with Lim Kim	2014	—	—N/a	—N/a	Roommate OST Part 1
"Empty Space"	2014	82	—N/a	KOR: 21,255+	Valid Love OST Part 2
"Dream" with Subin	2016	—	—N/a	—N/a	I Am a Movie Director Too OST Part 1
"A Love Shining Like a Star" (구르미 그린 달빛)	2016	21	—N/a	KOR: 62,555	Love in the Moonlight OST Part 7
"2Night" with Punchnello	2016	—	—N/a	—N/a	Entourage OST
"You Are So Beautiful" (이쁘다니까)	2016	5	—N/a	KOR: 1,057,036+	Guardian: The Lonely and Great God OST Part 5
"When Night Falls" (긴 밤이 오면)	2017	34		KOR: 93,842	While You Were Sleeping OST Part 1
"—" denotes releases that did not chart. The Kpop Hot 100 chart was inactive between May 17, 2014, and May 29, 2017.

==== Other releases ====
Title	Year	Peak chart positions		Sales	Album
Title	Year	KR Gaon	KR Hot 100	Sales	Album
"버스 안에서" (On The Bus)	2012	—	—	—N/a	Superstar K4
"Love Story"	2012	—	—	—N/a	Superstar K4
"I'll Be There"	2012	—	—	—N/a	Superstar K4
"아름다운 강산" (Beautiful Lands)	2012	—	—	—N/a	Superstar K4
"Sing a Song"	2012	—	—	—N/a	It's Top 12
"—" denotes releases that did not chart or were not released in that region.

== Filmography ==
=== Variety shows ===
Year	Title	Network	Notes
2012	Superstar K4	Mnet	
2014	Running Man	SBS	Guest episodes 195 and 58
2014	Immortal Songs 2	KBS	
2015	Always Cantare 2	tvN	
2015	Radio Star	MBC	Guest
2015	Yoo Hee-yeol's Sketchbook	KBS2	
2015	I Can See Your Voice	Mnet	Panelist (Season 1 – Episode 6)
2017	King of Mask Singer	MBC	Contestant as "The Prince Trumpets the Crown of the Crown" (Episodes 113–114)
2018	Friendly Driver	tvN	Guest

== Awards and nominations ==
=== Mnet Asian Music Awards ===
Year	Nominee / work	Award	Result
2014	Eddy Kim	Best New Artist	Nominated
2014	Eddy Kim	Union Pay Artist of the Year	Nominated

=== Seoul Music Awards ===
Year	Nominee / work	Award	Result
2015	Eddy Kim	Best New Artist	Won

== Chatroom controversy involving Jung Joon-young ==
On April 4, 2019, MBC Newsdesk reported that Eddy Kim was one of the members in a group chat where Jung Joon-young shared illicit videos of him having sex with other women without their consent. Mystic Entertainment revealed later that day that Eddy Kim was in fact in the chatroom, but denied that he was involved in the filming or spreading of the footage.

On March 6, 2020, all charges against Eddy Kim were dropped by the Seoul Central District Prosecutors' Office because the singer had only shared a photo he found online (on one occasion), and did not directly film nor distribute the illicit footage of the women. Additionally, the chatroom where he shared the photo was revealed as not the chatroom where Jung Joon Young shared the illicit footage, but just a group chat for hobbies.
