= Jung Joon-young =

South Korean former musician and sex offender (born 1989)

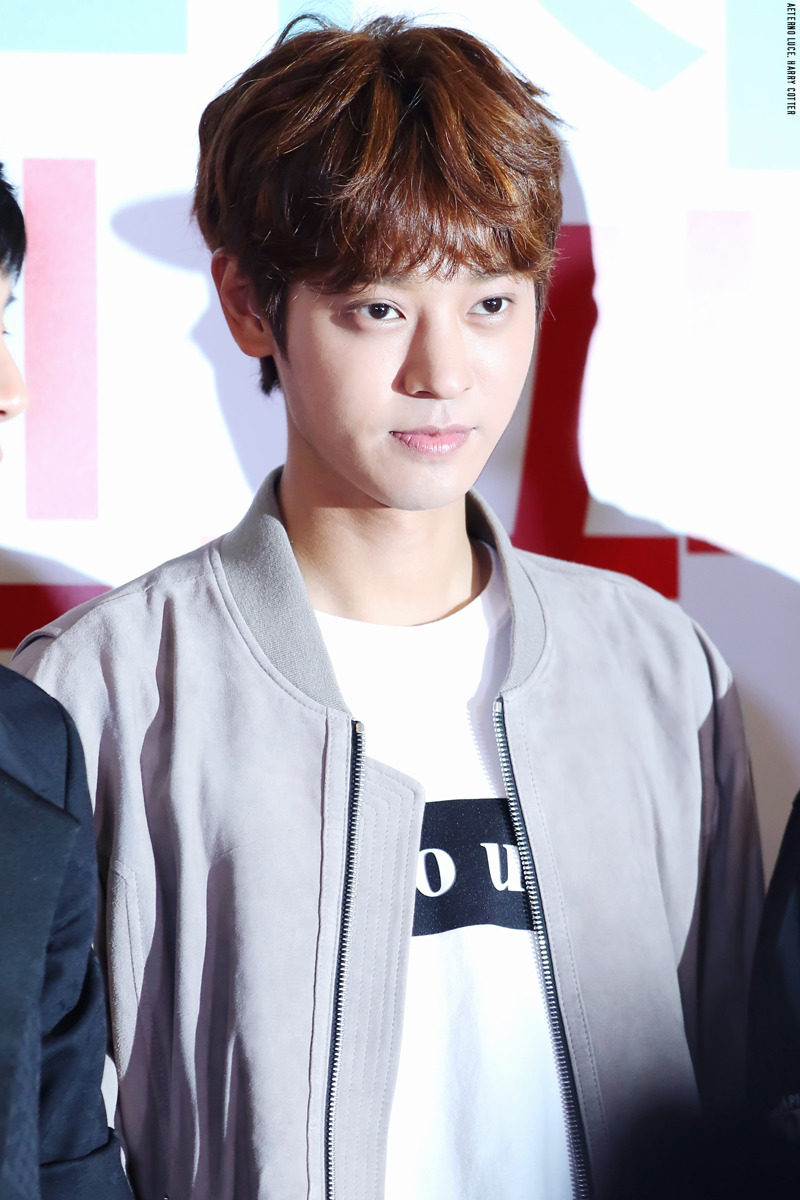
- Jung in 2016
- Born: February 21, 1989 (age 37); Seoul, South Korea
- Occupations: Singer; songwriter; actor; radio DJ; host; TV personality
- Criminal information
- Organizations: Jung Joon-young KakaoTalk chatrooms; Burning Sun
- Status: Released on March 19, 2024 (2 years ago)
- Convictions: Rape; illegal filming
- Penalty: 5 years (Served 4 years, 11 months and 27 days)

Details
- Date apprehended: March 21, 2019 (7 years ago)
- Musical career
- Genres: Rock; soft rock; alternative rock; garage rock; hard rock; post-punk revival
- Instruments: Vocals; guitar; piano; bass
- Years active: 2010–2019
- Labels: CJ ENM; C9; MakeUs
- Formerly of: Drug Restaurant

Korean name
- Hangul: 정준영
- Hanja: 鄭俊英
- RR: Jeong Junyeong
- MR: Chŏng Chunyŏng

Jung Joon-young (Korean: 정준영; born February 21, 1989) is a South Korean former musician who was convicted in 2019 as part of the Burning Sun scandal for gang-raping two different victims on two occasions in 2016, and then sharing videos of the rapes in private chatrooms.

Jung first gained recognition in the 2012 season of the musical reality competition television show Superstar K, where he finished in third place. In October 2013 he released his debut mini album, 1st Mini Album, which won him the "New Male Solo Artist" award at the 3rd Gaon Chart Music Awards. On June 26, 2014, he released his self-produced 2nd mini album, Teenager. On February 7, 2017, he released his studio album The First Person. From 2015 to March 2019, Jung was the lead vocalist of the rock band JJY Band, which was renamed Drug Restaurant in 2016.

In 2013, he joined the KBS2 variety show 2 Days & 1 Night as its youngest member and would be a cast member on the show until 2019. He hosted his own radio program titled Jung Joon-young's Simsimtapa on MBC FM from 2014 to 2015 and made his film debut in Love Forecast in 2015.

In March 2019, developments in the Burning Sun scandal led to the public reveal of Jung Joon-young KakaoTalk chatrooms. Subsequently, Jung retired from the entertainment industry, admitting that he had "filmed women without their consent and shared it". On November 29, 2019, Jung was sentenced to six years in prison for the rape of multiple drunk unconscious women and for non-consensually filming and sharing sexual images of his victims. In May 2020, the sentence was reduced to five years by the Seoul High Court.

== Early life ==
Jung Joon-young was born on February 21, 1989, in South Korea. He then grew up in Indonesia, China, Japan, France and Philippines. He is the youngest son of Jung Hak-chun and Choi Jong-sook. His father was an international businessman who travelled to many countries for his business. Jung learned to speak English, Chinese, and Korean fluently. He could not enroll in a regular school due to frequent moves. He took private lessons for subjects such as Math and English, as well as violin, and piano. He also got his fourth-degree black belt in Taekwondo.

When Jung turned 17, he went to the Philippines to do missionary work. He taught Taekwondo and music to the local children. He was a member of the choir that performed for the former president of the Philippines, Gloria Macapagal Arroyo. He stated that he got inspired by Kurt Cobain and was determined to become a rock star after he watched Nirvana's MTV Unplugged show when he was a teenager.

== Career ==
=== 2010–2012: Beginnings ===
Indie Bands period

Jung moved to South Korea the next year to start his musical career and soon signed to an entertainment agency, supposedly Danal Entertainment which released Jung's solo EP titled Rock Trip in 2010 as well as the digital single "환상 Fantasy" in 2012.

In 2010, Starkim Entertainment selected Jung as a vocalist of LEDApple. As one of the original members, he went through the training process and even finished recording the debut album with the band, however, before Led Apple's debut in 2010, Starkim Entertainment discovered that Jung was already under contract with the previous agency which refused to release him and, thus, he was dropped from the idol rock band.

In 2010, Jung dove into the Hongdae, Seoul indie music scene and formed various bands such as Flower Mist which busked in Japan and Switch On which performed for amateur club theaters.

Jung modeled for several online shopping malls. He was also featured in an advertisement for "BGF Retail", and participated in other artists' music videos, such as "Liquor Bottle" (술병 by Haha). Jung appeared on the TV show Ulzzang Generation Season 5 (Ep.1~Ep.8) and he said of the show, "People don't like this program because they think this is just about good looking boys and girls chatting on a TV show, but it was a good opportunity for me to make money."

Participation in Superstar K4

Week #	Date	Theme	Song Choice	Reference			
Week #	Date	Theme	Song Choice	Judge's mark (Lee, Yoon, Psy (Yoon))	Result	Vote# (vote, judge, online)	Remark
1st	August 17, 2012	First Official Audition	"What to Say" (뭐라할까, Breeze)			Seoul A Baek Ji-young;No Lee Seung-chul& Lee Ha-neul;Yes	
4th	September 9, 2012	Superweek solo	"BakHa Candy" (박하사탕 YB Band)	Safe			
5th	September 9, 2012	Superweek Collaboration	"Someday" (언젠가는, Lee Sang-eun)	Eliminated			Team leader
6th	September 21, 2012	One More Chance	"Yue-Ga" (여가, Jang Yun-ju)	Safe			
7th	September 28, 2012	Superweek Rival Death Match	"Becoming Dust" (먼지가되어, Kim Kyang-Suk)	Eliminated			vs. Roy Kim
8th	October 5, 2012	Judge's Final Decision (ByPSY)		Safe			
Live 1st Top12	October 12, 2012	First Love	"Waiting Everyday" (매일매일 기다려, TeeSams)	Safe (89,90,90)	2	116,923 / 770,000 (526,269, N/A)	Group Song "Making Love" (사랑만들기, Papaya)
Live 2nd Top 9	October 19, 2012	Rivalry (Vs. An Yae-sul)	"Bed of Roses" (Bed of Roses Bon Jovi)	Safe (87,88,89)	2	99,560 / 640,000 (388,264,96)	Group song "The Last Game" (마지막승부, Kim Min-kyo
Live 3rd Top7	November 2, 2012	Go Back (Past Life)	"It's Only My Life" (그것만이 내 세상, DulGukHwa)	Safe (86,86,87)	2	123,309 / 730,000 (388,259,96)	Group Song "Confession" (고백, DellySpice)
Live 4th Top6	November 2, 2012	My Style	"Outsider" (아웃사이더, Bom-Yeoreum-Gaeul-Gyeoeul	Safe (90,90,92)	2	147,905 / 810,000 (468,272,84)	Group Song "To You" (그대에게, Muhangwedo)
Live 5th Top4	November 9, 2012	Audience Song of Choice	"Emergency Room" (응급실, IZI 이지)	Safe (92,92,90)	2	222,121 / 810,000 (600,274,85)	surprising Concert "Waiting" (기다리다, Younha) "Creep" Creep Radiohead Duet with Roy Kim
Live 6th Top3	November 16, 2012	Judge's Mission	"Did You Forget" (잊었니, Lee Seung-chul) "First Love" (첫사랑, 나비효과)	Eliminated (85,94,93)	3	277,017 / 860,000 (555,272,84)	
Special Guest for Final	November 23, 2012	Final	"Becoming Dust" (먼지가 되어, Kim Kyang-Suk)				Top 12 special Performance "BulGunNoUl" (붉은 노을, BIGBANG) "Amateur" (아마츄어, Lee Seung-chul)

Since his band "Switch On" was little known to the public, Jung Joon-young tried to take part in Superstar K4 with Switch On members to gain more popularity as a band, but they could not continue the audition together due to issues with some foreign members' visas. Thus, he decided to carry on the audition as a solo artist.

During the Superweek, his low husky voice, appearance, and rather idiosyncratic personality appealed to the viewers as well as the judges, one of whom, PSY, was particularly impressed. Moreover, his collaboration with Roy Kim covering "먼지가 되어 (Becoming Dust)" by Kim Kwang-Suk, a ballad which Jung changed to a rock version, became a big hit and the best duet audition song ever. After its release, it achieved an "all-kill" on real-time charts and won the Mnet 20's Choice Hot Cover as well as 2013's Most Popular Karaoke Song of the Year at the 3rd Gaon Chart K-Pop Awards. Jung had been at risk of dropping out several times, but he passed through into the finals by Psy's choice in the judge's final decision.

Throughout the final stages, he stuck to rock as his only musical style. He received multiple suggestions to try a different genre of music, such as ballads, from the judges. However, on the other hand, his persistence for rock music impressed a lot of viewers, and as a result, it help him to establish a strong fandom. He was able to survive the third stage through a large number of phone votes. His covers that represented his rock style were "매일매일 기다려 Waiting Everyday" by TeeSams, "Bed of Roses" by Bon Jovi, and "Outsider" (Bom-Yeoreum-Gaeul-Gyeoeul), whose performance received a positive response from the judges and audience. On the fifth stage, he was urged to sing the rock ballad "응급실 Emergency Room" by IZI which had been chosen by the viewers instead of via his musical taste. Unexpectedly, it ranked highly, topping various online charts and earning favorable reactions from the public.

Though he was eliminated in the sixth stage of the semi-final from the top three, during his farewell interview Jung stated the following: "Superstar K4 was the turning point in my music career. Before I tried out for Superstar K4, only those who liked rock music listened to my songs. However, now a wider variety of people listen to my music and acknowledge me. I am glad that I got to make myself known through Superstar K4."

=== 2013: Debut and Self-Titled Mini Album ===
After Superstar K4, Jung had been doing concerts, TV and radio programs, modelling for cars, clothes, games, N-screen, and beer. From May 6, he worked as a DJ for MBC FM4U's Close Friend until September 1. He has appeared in several TV shows including KBS2's Immortal Songs: Singing the Legend, Happy Together, MBC's Radio Star, and We Got Married. He was featured in KBS's 2 Days & 1 Night Season 3 since December 1 (until his departure in 2016, and indefinite hiatus of the season in 2019 due to his scandals).

On May 21, Jung signed with CJ E&M after receiving offers from numerous entertainment companies.

After signing with CJ E&M, Jung released his debut single "Spotless Mind" (병이에요) with two versions of the music video being released: the N version and the S version on October 1. Just an hour after release, "Spotless Mind" gained the number one on Mnet, Bugs, and Soribada.

On October 10, Jung made his debut with the release of Jung Joon Young 1st mini album. The EP contained a total of six tracks, including the title track, "The Sense of an Ending" (이별 10분 전), and two songs that he participated in writing and composing: "Missed Call" (아는 번호) and "Take off Mask". The EP was a moderate success, ranking number one on both the daily and weekly chart of Synnara Record during its first week. In addition, "Spotless Mind" (병이에요) landed at the third place and "The Sense of an Ending" (이별 10분전) also took second place on MBC's Music Core.

He visited Taiwan in order to promote his first EP on December 8 and greeted 1,000 Taiwanese fans and had an autograph signing event with his song performances for those who had purchased a special limited edition of his album.

Jung earned the award for New Male Solo Artist for "이별 10분전 (The Sense of an Ending)" and Most Popular Karaoke Song of the Year for "먼지가 되어 (Becoming Dust)" at the 3rd Gaon Chart K-Pop Awards. He also earned Star of the Year at the MBC Entertainment Awards.

=== 2014: Teenager ===
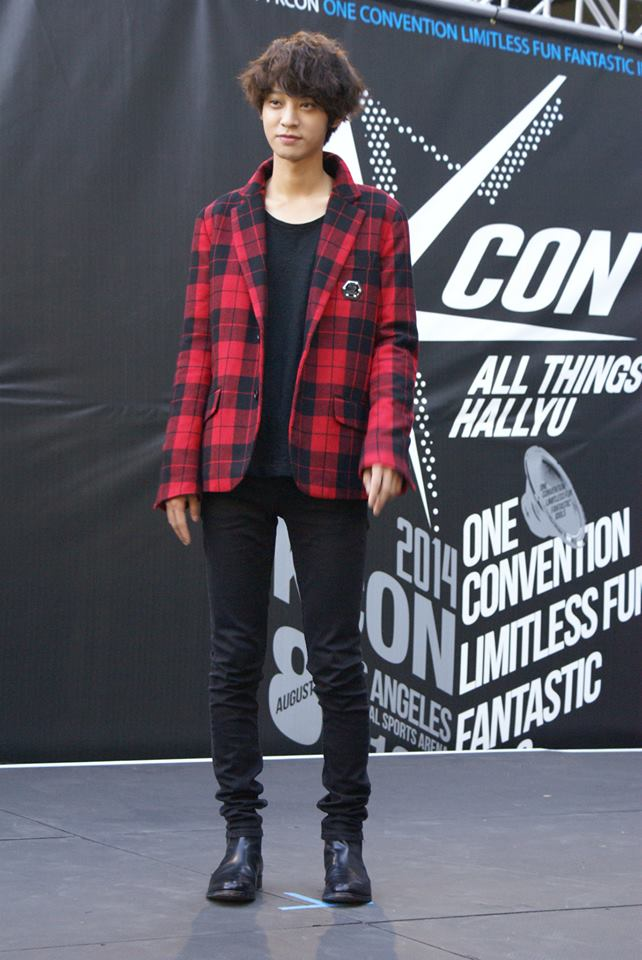
Jung at KCON in Los Angeles, 2014

On January 2, he released an OST for Pretty Man called "하루만 (I'm Nobody)" written and composed by himself that contains two versions such as an American rock style version and a British pop style drama version. The rock ballad "I'm Nobody" (하루만) has topped Bugs Chart and Mnet Chart within its first five days of release.

On March 12, Jung released an official cheer song, "Always Reds", which was collaborated with the hip hop group Soul Dive, a track on the Red Devils' official cheer album "We are the Reds" for 2014 FIFA World Cup in Brazil.

Jung joined hands with Younha for the duet song "달리함께 (Just the way you are)" which encourages people to gain confidence. The song combines both the rock spirit and ballad. Upon its release on May 29, it ranked top on several music charts such as Mnet, Bugs, and Olleh Music.

Jung returned with his second EP, Teenager, on June 26. All the tracks in the album were composed and produced by Jung and he also participated in the design and production of the album's concept, cover picture, and all other minor details regarding the album. The theme of the album was "the adult who dreams" and contained his wish for people who are exhausted by the world to start dreaming again. It ranked third on Gaon Album Chart in its first week of release.

On July 19, Jung joined the cast of Pretty Man as a guest performer for the drama concert in Japan. Jung Joon-young appeared at KCON Los Angeles, California as one of hosts as well as a guest performer from August 9 to 10 and made his American concert debut by performing his singles, including self-created rock single "Teenager". He also entertained the audience by covering his own version of Michael Jackson's "Black or White". After having a showcase in Taiwan, he held a concert tour, titled "2014 Demo Live Tour with Jung Joon-young," in China, beginning on November 14 in Beijing, followed by Shenzhen on November 15 and Shanghai on November 16.

On August 1, Jung Joon-young's rep stated Jung Joon-young will be taking on the challenge of a movie through Love Forecast starring alongside Lee Seung-gi and Moon Chae-won in which Jung Joon-young's character has a one-sided love towards Moon Chae-won's character.

Jung Joon-young participated in the OST for SBS's Modern Farmer, singing the song "Same Place" which is a rock ballad that tells a heart-breaking love story.

Thanks to his appearances on KBS2's 2 Days & 1 Night season 3, he won the "Top Entertainer Award in a Variety Show" at the 2014 KBS Entertainment Awards.

=== 2015: JJY Band ===
Jung Joon-young made his big screen debut through a light-hearted romantic comedy film Love Forecast, which was released on January 14. Jung next starred in The Lover, a 19+ drama aired by Mnet, playing an unknown musician who is both living with and dating a woman 12 years his senior. Later, he had a cameo in the 10th episode of the drama The Producers, with Roy Kim as an anti-fan.

Jung debuted with the rock band JJY Band, releasing their first album, Escape to Hangover, and the title track "OMG" on May 27. "OMG" was composed by Jung and Vanilla Unity's Lee Seung-joo. Their debut album received positive reviews from music fans and critics.

Jung next joined a new variety show called Old House, New House aired by JTBC as a cast member. The show features celebrities paired up with professional designers to provide home decoration and improvement, where each week, two groups will compete with each other to see which home makeover is the best.

=== 2016: Sympathy ===
A representative from CJ E&M announced that their contract with Jung expired in November 2015. Jung decided to not renew his contract with CJ E&M. On January 5, 2016, C9 Entertainment announced that Jung and his band officially signed an exclusive contract with their label, REALIVE.

On February 19, Jung announced his comeback with the single album, 공감 (Sympathy). He picked soft rock as the main sound for his new solo album. "공감 (Sympathy)", the title track, is a duet song recorded with Korean singer, Seo Young-eun. It was written, composed, and produced by Jung. He also wrote, composed, and produced another track in the album and included his broad musical abilities in the album. Jung unveiled his new songs for the first time during JJY Band's concert on February 20 and 21 at the Art Hall of Lottecard Art Center in Seoul. 공감 (Sympathy) was released on February 24 along with the music video of the title track. On February 26, Jung released the music video for the second track in the album, "Amy".

tvN announced on March 7 that Jung will join their cooking show, 집밥 백선생 2 (Mr. Baek The Homemade Food Master Season 2), as one of the casts where he will learn from Baek Jong-won, a popular Korean chef, about the art of home cooking. On March 30, JTBC announced that Jung will team up with Kangin, Jeong Jinwoon, and Lee Chul Woo for a new reality show, Hitmaker, in which they'll be travelling overseas to try other countries' sports.

=== 2017: The First Person ===
On January 31, Jung announced through his Instagram account that he would release his first full album, entitled 1인칭 (The First Person). On February 1, C9 Entertainment announced that "나와 너 (Me and You)" was the name of the title track, it is a ballad song featuring a senior Korean singer, Jang Hye-jin. Two days later, Jung's agency revealed the tracklist of the album through their Twitter account. The album consists of nine tracks including both an intro and outro, five new songs and two songs from his previous single album, 공감 (Sympathy). All songs in the album were written, composed and arranged by Jung. The producer of this album are Jung Joon-young and Lee Ji-hyun. The album was released digitally on February 7. The music video for his title track "나와 너 (Me and You)" was also shared on Jung's official YouTube channel. On February 18, Jung's agency announced that the Chinese version of his first full album, The First Person, was released digitally on iTunes and KKBox that day in four countries, Taiwan, Hongkong, Singapore and Malaysia. The physical CD was released on March 17. The Chinese version consists of 12 tracks, which included the nine songs from the Korean version of the album and three Chinese versions of the tracks "Sympathy", "Amy", and "Me and You".

=== 2018–2019: Fiancée ===
On January 18, C9 Entertainment announced that Jung had joined eSports team, "Team Kongdoo", which specializes in PlayerUnknown's Battlegrounds (PUBG) as professional gamer and they held an initiation ceremony on January 17. On March 5, C9 Entertainment announced that Jung would be releasing a single at the end of the month. The single was later revealed to be titled "Fiancée" and featured Korean rapper, Microdot. It set to be released on March 29 through digital download and CD. The song is written and composed by Jung Joon Young and Moon Kim from Royal Pirates and the rap part is written by Microdot. Jung held his solo concert, Sing on May 19 and 20 in Shinhwa Cardan Square Live Hall, Mapo, Seoul. Jung appeared in 2018 World DJ Festival Anthem Compilation, performing a new track called Fly alongside Advanced on May 28.

It was announced that Jung was participating in the theme songs for the 2018 FIFA World Cup in Russia. Jung will be singing the third track titled, Hifive Republic of Korea in the album called, We, The Reds. On July 13, Jung along with BTOB's Yook Sung-jae took part on the media launch of Viu original reality show called "Hello K-Idol". It was reported that both Jung and Yook will be special mentors.

On October 19, Jung announced on his Instagram that he will be officially opening a restaurant which is called 'Maison de Coréein' in Paris next year after a month of running as a pop-up restaurant.

On March 12, 2019, Jung retired from the entertainment industry.

== KakaoTalk chatroom scandal and rape sentence ==
On March 11, 2019, it was alleged that in 2015 and 2016, Jung had secretly filmed his own sexual encounters with at least 10 women, then shared the videos with friends in chat groups. The allegations surfaced during a police investigation into Seungri for allegedly providing prostitution services, and resulted in Jung being investigated as well. The following day, Jung retired from the entertainment industry, admitting to crimes that he had "filmed women without their consent and shared it in a chatroom". He apologized to the multiple women he filmed, as well as his fans, and also pledged to cooperate with police. On March 21, Jung was arrested over allegations that he illegally shared sexually explicit videos of women taken without their knowledge or consent through a social media chatroom on eleven occasions.

On April 19, 2019, a woman came forward to SBS funE, claiming that five men including Jung had raped her in March 2016 and then shared an audio file and photos of the incident in a group chat. On May 10, 2019, Jung pleaded guilty to all eleven cases of secretly filming and sharing the videos of himself having sex with women in a chatroom, and he sought to come to legal settlements with the victims. Jung and Choi Jong-hoon were also under investigation for allegedly being involved in the gang rape of a woman in 2016.

On November 29, 2019, Jung was sentenced to six years in prison and a mandatory education program on sexual crimes for gang raping drunk unconscious women. Jung was additionally convicted of secretly filming himself having sex with other women and sharing the footage without their consent. On May 12, 2020, Seoul High Court reduced Jung's sentence from six years to five after he submitted documents expressing his regret. In November 2020, his personal Instagram account was deleted by the social network itself, on the grounds that it has a policy of deactivating accounts of convicted sex offenders.

On March 19, 2024, Jung was released from a prison in Mokpo, South Jeolla upon completion of his prison sentence. Upon his release, he was not required to wear an electronic ankle tag or disclose personal information, such as residential address and identifiable photographs in the sex offender registry, as it was being subjected to the judge's discretion in the initial sentencing.

== Discography ==
=== Studio albums ===
- The First Person (2017)

== Concert tour and live performances ==
2012

- Superstar K4 Top12 Concert : Dec 20 – 31 in Seoul, Incheon, Daegu, Gwangju, Suwon and Busan

2013

- Jung Joon-young's Dream Concert
- CGV ShinChon Mini Concert

2014

- Busan Juvenile Talk Concert
- Jung Joon-young's Talk Concert
- Jung Joon-young's 1st Fan Meeting
- Jung Joon Young & Eddie Kim Collaboration Concert in Ulsan
- 2014 Demo Live Tour with Jung Joon Young in China

2017

- Jung Joon Young Live Concert with Drug Restaurant in Seoul, Daegu and Daejeon
- Jung Joon Young Live Concert with Drug Restaurant in Taipei
- Jung Joon Young Showcase in Tokyo
- Jung Joon Young "Me & You" Concert with Drug Restaurant in Tokyo

2018

- Jung Joon Young "Sing" Concert with Drug Restaurant in Seoul
- Jung Joon Young Europe Concert Tour with Drug Restaurant in Paris, Düsseldorf, Amsterdam and Lisbon
- Jung Joon Young "Fiancée" Fan Meeting in Manila
- Jung Joon Young Live Tour with Drug Restaurant in Chicago, Dallas, San Juan and New York City
- Jung Joon Young "Blue Party" Concert in Seoul

== Filmography ==
=== Music video appearances ===
Year	Title	Artist	Ref.
2014	"Mr. Ambiguous"	Mamamoo feat Bumkey	

=== Film ===
Year	Title	Role
2015	Love Forecast	Yeom Hyo-bong / Andrew

=== Television series ===
Year	Title	Role	Network
2013	Monstar	Han Ji-woong (young / ep.9)	Mnet
2014	You Are My Destiny	Radio DJ (ep.8)	MBC
2015	The Lover	Jung Young-joon	Mnet
2015	The Producers	Cindy's anti-fan (ep.10)	KBS2
2016	The Sound of Your Heart	Jo Suk's neighbor (ep.6)	KBS2

=== Variety programs ===
Year	Title	Note
2010	Tent in the City	Cameo
2011	Ulzzang Generation Season 5	Cast Member
2013	Jung Joon-young's Be Stupid	Behind the scenes of album making process
2013	We Got Married (Season 4)	Couple with Jeong Yu-mi
2013–2019	2 Days & 1 Night Season 3	Cast Member
2014	M! Countdown	MC along with Ahn Jae-hyun
2014	Foul Interview: 4 Things Show	Main Interviewee
2014	Fashion King Korea 2	Cast Member, paired with designer Han Sang-hyuk
2014	Style Icon Awards 2014	MC
2015	Two Young	Cast Member
2015	Laws of the Jungle in Samoa	Cast Member (Episodes 186–189)
2015	Old House New House	Cast Member
2016	Mr. Baek The Homemade Food Master 2	Cast Member
2016	Hit Maker	Cast Member
2016	What The Chart	MC
2016	Celebrity Bromance	Cast Member with Roy Kim
2016	Laws of the Jungle in East Timor	Cast Member (Episodes 238–240)
2017	Male Friend x Female Friend	Cast Member
2017	Trip of The Beer Lovers	Cast Member
2017	My Sweet Town	Host
2017	My Unexpected Sweet Trip	Cast Member
2017	Salty Tour	Cast Member
2018	Law of the Jungle in Cook Islands	Cast Member (Episodes 299–301)
2018	Royal Adventure	Cast Member
2018	One Night Food Trip (International Edition)	Cast Member

=== Radio programs ===
Date	Channel	Title	Role	Notes
Jan 28, 2013 – Mar 3,2013	MBC FM4U	Hope Song at Noon 김신영의 정오의 희망곡	DJ	Temporary DJ for February 2013
May. 06, 2013~ Sept.01,2013	MBC FM4U	Close Friend 친한친구	DJ	From 20:00 to 22:00
July 7, 2014 – November 15, 2015	MBC FM	Jung Joon-young's Simsimtapa 정준영의 심심타파	DJ	From 24:00 to 02:00

== Awards and nominations ==
Year	Award/Critics	Category	Result	Ref.
2013	3rd Gaon Chart Music Awards	New Male Solo Artist of the Year	Won	
2013	3rd Gaon Chart Music Awards	Popular Singer of the Year with Roy Kim	Won	
2013	15th Mnet Asian Music Award	Best New Male Artist	Nominated	
2013	15th Mnet Asian Music Award	Artist of the Year	Nominated	
2013	MBC Entertainment Awards	Star of the Year	Won	
2013	28th Golden Disk Awards	New Rising Star Award	Nominated	
2013	28th Golden Disk Awards	Popularity Award	Nominated	
2013	23rd Seoul Music Awards	Rookies Award	Nominated	
2013	Mnet 20's Choice Awards	20's Hot Cover Music with Roy Kim	Won	
2014	7th Style Icon Asia	Top 10 Style Icons	Nominated	
2014	16th Mnet Asian Music Award	Style in Music	Won	
2014	16th Mnet Asian Music Award	Best Band Performance	Nominated	
2014	16th Mnet Asian Music Award	Union Pay Song of the Year (TEENAGER)	Nominated	
2014	KBS Entertainment Awards	Best Entertainer Award (Variety)	Won	
2015	Korea Wave Fashion Festival	Best Airport Fashion (Singer Category)	Won	
2015	17th Mnet Asian Music Award	Best Band Performance	Nominated	
2015	17th Mnet Asian Music Award	Union Pay Song of the Year (OMG)	Nominated	
2015	KBS Entertainment Awards	Excellence Award (Variety)	Nominated	
