= Teenager (Jung Joon-young EP) =

EP by Jung Joon-young
- Released: June 26, 2014
- Recorded: 2014
- Genre: Rock
- Length: 26:20
- Language: Korean
- Label: CJ E&M
- Producer: Lee Jae Won; Jung Joon-young

Jung Joon-young chronology
| 1st Mini Album (2013) | Teenager (2014) |

Singles from Teenager
- 1. "Teenager" Released: June 26, 2014

Teenager is the second EP by South Korean singer Jung Joon-young, released by CJ E&M on June 26, 2014, as the follow-up to his 1st mini-album, which was released in October, 2013.

It contains 6 tracks including the title track "Teenager" and other tracks "To Me" (내가나에게), "Friends" (친구), "Lip Service" (이빨), "Hold On", and "Sailboat" (돛단배). All songs on the EP were composed and produced by Jung himself. He also participated in the design and production of the album's concept, cover picture, and all other minor details regarding the album.

Teenager was not as commercially successful as Jung's first mini-album, but it performed relatively in terms of physical sales; it ranked third on Gaon's weekly album chart in its first week of release as well as tenth on the monthly chart. It sold over 10,000 copies within its first three weeks of release.

Jung stated about the EP: "I know some aren't into rock, but I'm glad to be doing what I want to do. I know rock is not a popular genre, but it can be, if my music is widely heard."

== Background and release ==
On June 19, 2014, CJ E&M announced that Jung would release his second mini-album on June 26 of that year.

It had already been eight months since the release of his 1st mini album, he finally has returned as a rocker after spending most of the time on TV, appearing in a number of TV reality programs. Though Some fans were even worried that his image would become stuck as a TV figure and not a musician due to his frequent television appearances on entertainment shows rather than musical activities and the delay of his next album, he didn't hasten to release the second album and just focused on making it perfect, as he referred that “It took me about eight months to prepare this album, which I felt was a very short period of time; but since the preparation process was really fun, I did not feel pressured to rush the new release."

While he was preparing for Teenager, Jung tried to let his fans participate in making his album and share the concept of album. He asked his fans to join in filming his music video as extras and opened up comeback site to share photos of their teenage years on Instagram with the hashtag #IAMATEENAGER for a spot on the site.

Starting on June 19, he unveiled all four teaser images that carry youthful spirit with the mischievous expression and contain special messages for the upcoming album, one a day, to complete a puzzle that consists of four pieces of images at last.

On June 22, Jung revealed the track list for Teenager through a street mural in Hongdae, a neighborhood known for its lively music and artistic scene.

After releasing the music video teaser on June 23, he released the music video for the lead single "Teenager" on June 25. The music video represents the concept of the album, "a dreaming adult", by portraying Jung as an office worker who has the free spirit of a teenager. Unable to withstand the restrictive atmosphere of the office, he escapes to perform in front of his fans.

On June 26, 2014, Teenager was released.

== Promotion ==
On June 26, the day of releasing Teenager, a showcase for Jung was held in a unique seminar format on at Seoul's IFC Mall, where he appeared dressed in a suit. He introduced the album and works under the title "Jung Joon Young's Self Presentation". During the showcase, Jung performed three of the album's singles: "Hold On", "To Me", and the album's lead single "Teenager".

Starting from KBS's Music Bank on June 27, he promoted the title track "Teenager" on several music shows such as Mnet's M! Countdown, SBS MTV's The Stage of Big Pleasure, MBC's Music Core and Show! Champion.

He also met with fans through signing events and live concerts including "Someday in July", "Collaboration Concert with Eddie Kim" and "Let's Rock Festival".

He also performed tracks from the EP live abroad. After holding his first oversea showcase with 800 fans in Taiwan on July 13, 2014, he held an American concert at K-CON 2014 on August 10 of that year, and also traveled to several cities in China and Japan to promote the album.

== Music and lyrics ==
=== Music ===
Teenager includes a total of six alternative rock songs all composed and produced by Jung. He got a chance to further develop his musical ability as well as broaden the musical range by creating all tracks. Junggigo and Park Asher also participated by writing the lyrics to the songs. Pia members Kim Ki Bum and Yang Hye Sung also joined Jung Joon Young as the main session band for the album, giving off a strong rock sound.

CJ E&M staff stated: "The second mini album is Jung Joon Young's everything – his past, present, and future. This album is truly by him and made for him. No detail has gone past Jung Joon Young." CJ E&M also revealed that the album is in the alternative rock genre which had been Jung's favorite since childhood, with the six tracks each showing a different range in the spectrum of the genre. Instead of going with music to satisfy the general public, he explored his musical interests through his album. He explained that Teenager is "more rock" and "less mainstream" compared to his first mini-album. "This album is harder rock than my first album. I really didn't care much about mass appeal in this album. I think the mass appeal doesn't really match my musical style. So I enjoyed this album even more and I even liked it better when it was released. Although there would be those people who wouldn't like some of the tracks, I hope there would be those who would have better thoughts about rock music when they hear my songs."

=== Lyrical themes ===
The concept of the album is a "dreaming adult". He is telling his own story and experiences throughout. He mentioned to Korea Herald: "The songs embody the idea of an adult who continues to dream on; as children, we would dream about growing up and what things will be like when we are adults. I think even as adults, we have dreams that are always changing so I wanted to express the notion that we are always dreaming children at heart." In addition, each song contains themes including dreams, love, friendship, and loneliness. As an album producer, he made a decision about the concept and chose the songwriters, asking them to write the lyrics that were well suited to the songs.

== Singles ==
"To Me" (내가 나에게) is an alternative rock song which is added the mood of trendy style of music along with brass instruments, sound effects, and rap. It has the message that it is better to pursue one's dream instead of following money through lyrics such as "Why change your own color / why chase your green dollar". It has attempted rap rock approach with a fast, rhythmic beat and he has used a megaphone to emphasize the chorus line during his live performance on the stages.

The lead single "Teenager" combines alternative rock music and string arrangements. Conceptually based on the fictional Lost Boys adage of never wanting to grow up, the song is about trying to recapture one's youth through rock and roll. Jung stated that he had the most fun with the work evocative of his own teenage years while he was creating it.

"Lip Service" (이빨) embodies the originality of alternative rock and highlights each musical instrument's color. It expresses displeasure about flattery and hypocrisy and tells a message that people those who lie can get hurt by their own words.

"Friends" (친구) is the hardest rock song among the six tracks. It is focused on the sounds of musical instruments including electric guitar. Lyrically, it describes longing for his friends in other countries. It took him only thirty minutes to compose this single after he had met his friends again in the Philippines.

"Hold On" is characterized by natural sounds of musical instruments. It represents his wish that somebody holds on to him and comforts him when he feels lonely. He confesses that when he is contented and on the spotlight, on the other hand he feels depressed and alone.

"Sailboat" (돛단배) is focused on the sound of piano and string arrangement whereas other tracks are concerned with guitar solo. He mentioned that "Sailboat" is his favorite song among the tracks on the album just like "Missed Call" on 1st Mini Album. This song was inspired by the scene of the river during his trip to Paris and it compares tears flowing into the water as an expression of deep sorrow.

== Track listing ==
| No. | Title | Lyrics | Music | Arrangement | Length |
|---|---|---|---|---|---|
| 1. | "To Me" (내가 나에게) | Zito of Souldive | Jung Joon Young, Lee Ji Hoon | Space-cowboy, Jung Joon Young, Lee Ji Hoon | 4:09 |
| 2. | "Teenager" | Zito of Souldive | Jung Joon Young, Lee Ji Hoon | Space-cowboy, Jung Joon Young, Lee Ji Hoon | 4:15 |
| 3. | "Lip Service" (이빨) | Lee Seung Joo | Jung Joon Young | Lee Seung Joo, Jung Joon Young, Lee Ji Hoon | 4:07 |
| 4. | "Friends" (친구) | Zito of Souldive | Jung Joon Young, Lee Ji Hoon | Lee Seung Joo, Jung Joon Young, Lee Ji Hoon | 4:13 |
| 5. | "Hold On" | Junggigo | Jung Joon Young, Lee Ji Hoon | Jung Joon Young, Lee Ji Hoon | 4:28 |
| 6. | "Sailboat" (돛단배) | Park Asher, Jung Joon Young | Jung Joon Young | Park Asher, Jung Joon Young, Lee Ji Hoon | 5:08 |
| Total length: | | | | | 26:20 |

== Charts ==
=== Album ===
| Chart | Peak position |
|---|---|
| Gaon Weekly album chart | 3 |
| Gaon Monthly album chart | 10 |

=== "Teenager" ===
| Chart | Peak position |
|---|---|
| Gaon Weekly digital chart | 35 |
| Gaon Weekly streaming chart | 99 |
| Gaon Weekly download chart | 23 |

=== Music shows ===
| Song | Peak position | | | |
| Song | M! Countdown | Music Bank | Music Core | Show! Champion |
|---|---|---|---|---|
| "Teenager" | 7 | 18 | 21 | 11 |

== Release history ==
| Country | Date | Format | Label |
|---|---|---|---|
| South Korea | June 26, 2014 | CD, digital download | CJ E&M |
