= Drug Restaurant =

South Korean rock band

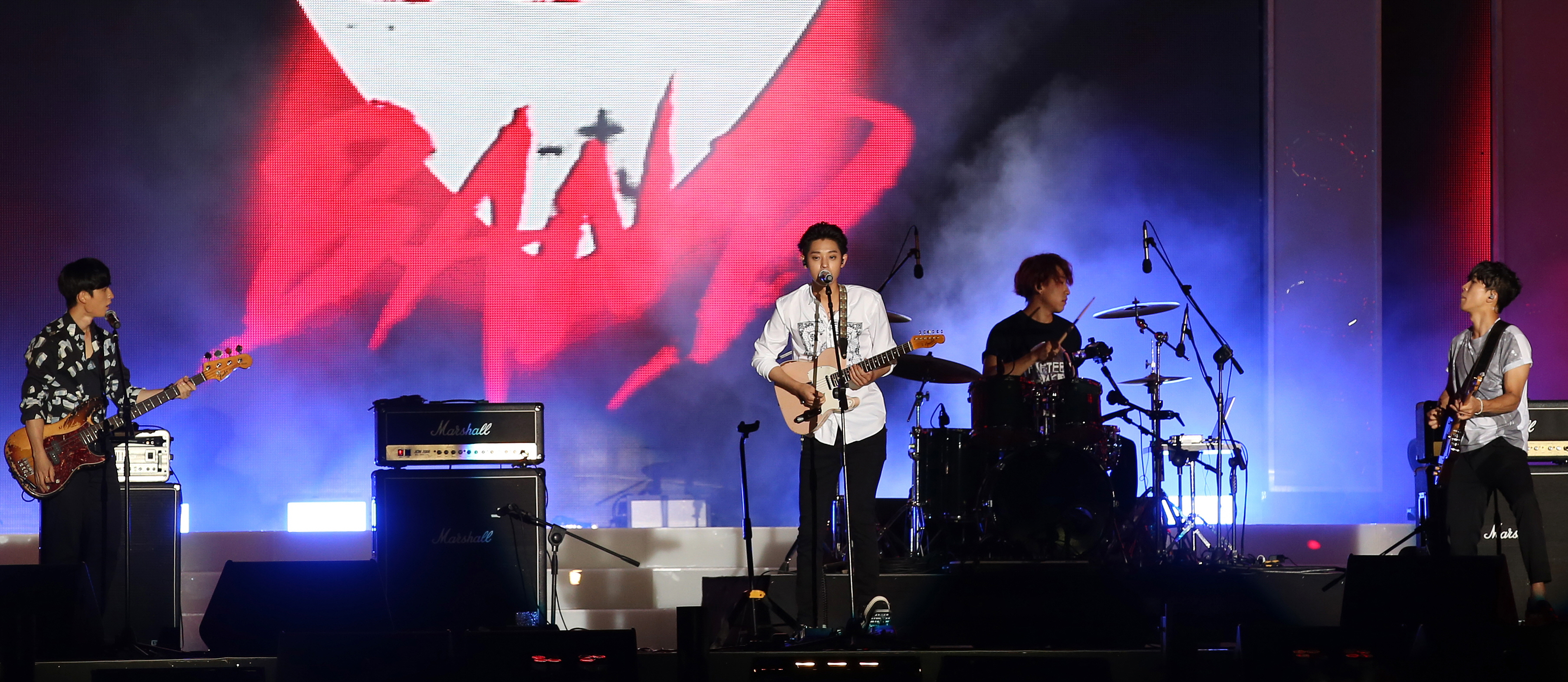
- Drug Restaurant at the 2015 Summer K-pop Festival

Background information
- Also known as: JJY Band (2014-2016)
- Origin: Seoul, South Korea
- Genres: Alternative rock; hard rock; post-punk revival; NWONW
- Years active: 2015–2019
- Labels: CJ E&M; C9 Entertainment
- Past members: Jung Joon-young; Dammit; Seokwon; Drok.Q

Drug Restaurant (Korean: 드럭 레스토랑), formerly known as the Jung Joon Young Band (JJY Band) (정준영밴드), was a Korean rock band, formed in Seoul, South Korea in 2015. The band consisted of bassist Jung Seok-won, guitarist Jo Dae-min (Dammit), and drummer Lee Hyun-gyu (Drok. Q). Vocalist and guitarist Jung Joon-young retired from the industry on March 12, 2019. The band was formed by Jung a year after he debuted as solo singer in 2013. The band released their debut album, Escape to Hangover, on May 27, 2015. JJY Band changed their name to Drug Restaurant on May 20, 2016, because they wanted to go with a name that focuses on the band as a whole rather than centering it around the frontman vocalist.

== History ==
=== 2015–2016: Formation ===
After being a solo artist for more than a year, Jung decided to be in a band again, saying: “When I first signed with my company, it was agreed that I would eventually work with a band. Since I started music with a band, it was actually hard for me to bring out my true style when working by myself. I thought I needed to go back to what I knew. This seemed like the right time.”

Jung was introduced to Jo Dae-min, Jung Seok-won and Lee Hyun-gyu by producer who worked with him in his solo album in 2014. All three are known to be already established musicians in the indie music scene. Guitarist Jo Dae-min (Dammit) is a former member of rock band Vanilla Unity that regularly guested at Seo Taiji’s concerts, bassist Jung Seok-won is a former member of Munch and Fantastic Drugstore, and drummer Lee Hyun-kyu (Drok. Q) is a former member of Munch as well as “Superstar K” contestant Bell Band. Dammit wasn't sure about Jung's musical style when he first heard about the offer to play with him: “I mostly knew him through variety programs, and I thought it would be a one-time thing. But working together, we fit really well, and now we’re determined to keep this going.”

=== 2015: Escape to Hangover ===
Jung Joon-young and his newly formed band started to work on their debut album in early 2015. Jung and Dammit worked together to compose all of the tracks in the album, but all of the members helped to arrange the songs. “I created the big frameworks for the songs, and each member tweaked their part to their liking,” Jung said. “I love garage rock, so we listened to garage rock songs and worked on the music together. It turned out really well.”

JJY Band's first eight-track EP Escape to Hangover touches base with Jung's rock roots, spanning alternative rock, hard rock and garage rock tracks. The title track "OMG" was produced by Brian Howes who had produced songs for Bon Jovi, Simple Plan, and Boys Like Girls, among others. Ok Yo-Han, vocalist of Pia, co-wrote the 8th track in the album, "Lizard". For "Lizard", Jung originally wanted to express his opinions on smoking, but it didn't pass Korean Broadcast Liberation. In the end, he had to change the lyrics with the help of Ok Yo-han into a song about cunning people. Escape to Hangover was released on May 27, 2015, with lead single "OMG" and its music video released at the same time. Their debut album received positive reviews from music fans and critics.

JJY band held their very first solo concert in December 2015 with the name "JJY Band's Live & Talk 2015 'Attention'". Their first show was held in Tokyo on December 13. They continued the tour in Shanghai on December 26 and Seoul on December 30–31.

=== 2016: New label, new name and Mistake ===
A representative from CJ E&M announced that their contract with Jung Joon-young expired in November 2015. Jung decided to not renew his contract with CJ E&M. On January 5, 2016, C9 Entertainment announced that Jung and his band officially signed an exclusive contract with their label, REALIVE. Under the new label, JJY Band announced that they would hold their first nationwide tour. Their first show kicked off in Daejeon on February 5 and continued in Busan on February 6, then in Seoul on February 20–21.

On May 20, C9 Entertainment officially announced that Jung Joon Young Band had changed their name to Drug Restaurant. This was to shift the focus from the frontman, Jung Joon-young, to the group as a whole. The name "Drug Restaurant" was said to represent the band's desire to provide listeners with a greater relief than any drug in the drugstore and to offer a gateway out from the pressures of society.

Drug Restaurant returned with their self-titled second album which was released on May 27 through digital download and on June 9 as a physical album. Their new album consists of five tracks including the title track, "Mistake". The fifth track, "When the Money's Back", is only available on physical CD. The title track and its music video were released on June 8. All songs in the album were composed by Jung Joon-young and Dammit. Every member wrote one song for the album. The title track, "Mistake", was written by Jung Joon-young, "Sexy Bomb" by Dammit, "What?!" by Jung Seok-won and "When the Money's Back" by Drok.Q. While the arrangement for all songs in the album were done by Dammit, Jung Seok-won and Drok.Q

=== 2017: Pomade ===
On July 22, C9 Entertainment released a teaser image and announced that Drug Restaurant would be making a comeback with their third album, Pomade, on August 4. The photo shows all four members but only the back side of their head. On August 1, C9 released the tracklist for the album which consist of six songs plus one bonus track that will only be available on the physical album.

Drug Restaurant shared in an interview with Ceci magazine for the August issue that all the songs' lyrics in Pomade would be in English, making it their first English album. Jung said he recorded the demo in English so he wanted to keep the vibe and nuances in the final version for the album. Jung continued that expressions in English and Korean are different and it'd sound awkward if they translated it back to Korean. Dammit said in previous albums they focused on accentuating Jung's vocals, but this time there are a lot of songs that highlight the characteristic of each instrument they play. All songs in the album were written, composed and produced by the band. The title track, Drink O2 in the Water, was written by Seokwon and composed by Jung and Dammit.

Pomade was released through digital download on August 4, while physical album will be released on August 8. The title track, Drink O2 in The Water, was released through digital download a day before on August 3 and the music video was uploaded on YouTube at the same time with the album released on August 4. The music video itself is actually lyric video where it shows footages of people having fun on the beach with the lyrics of the song written on it. The band themselves didn't make appearance in the music video.

Jung announced on his personal Instagram that Drug Restaurant would take their tour to Europe in September. There had been rumor about it for a while, but nothing had been confirmed. He said he has friend in Paris who is a tour promoter for Korean artists who didn't make their debut in South Korea. Joon Young asked if his band could join and his friends liked the idea very much. Drug Restaurant will bring their show to ten cities, kicks off in Moscow on September 3 and end in Prague on September 24.

=== 2018: "Her", "403" ===
On December 26, 2017, C9 Entertainment announced that Drug Restaurant would release a new digital single on January 1, 2018, "Her". Along with the announcement, C9 released the single cover that showed the band standing on the staircase with the song's title written on the window behind them. Drug Restaurant said they got the inspiration to write the song during their Europe tour in September 2017. They decided to release the song as album single and not a part of EP or full album because they wanted to commemorate their first Europe tour. "Her" was written by Seokwon, composed by Joonyoung and Dammit, and produced by the band themselves.

"Her" was released as a digital download on January 1 and the music video was uploaded to YouTube on January 2. The music video shows the footage of their Europe tour from their performances, backstage and places they visited while in Europe.

A week earlier, C9 Entertainment announced that Drug Restaurant would release a new digital single on August 31, 2018, "403". On release date, the single cover is unveiled which showed the door to room 403 is opened and inside the room there's bed with a dying rose on it floating on the sea with a full moon in the background. "403" was released through digital download on August 31 and the music video was uploaded to YouTube on the same day. "403" was written by Drok Q, composed by Joonyoung and Dammit, and produced by the band themselves.

On September 5, the band embarked on their Europe tour, JJY x Drug Restaurant Europe Concert Tour 2018. The tour ended on September 9 at Lisbon. This was the second time promoter, Young Bros brought the band for Europe tour.

The band also held JJY x Drug Restaurant with BJR US Live Tour from October 14 in Chicago to October 21 in New York City. The tour is presented by Studio Pav.

=== 2019: Jung Joon-young's retirement and disbandment ===
On March 11, 2019, it was revealed that Jung Joon-young was a suspect in the Burning Sun scandal, having filmed sexual encounters with at least 10 women in the past. He announced his retirement from the industry the following day. In an interview with Dammit a week later, it was mentioned that Drug Restaurant had disbanded.

== Members ==
=== Former ===
- Jung Joon-young (준영) – vocals, rhythm guitar
- Dammit (대민) – lead guitar, backing vocals
- Seokwon (석원) – bass guitar, backing vocals
- Drok. Q (드록 규) – drums

== Discography ==
=== Extended plays ===
Title	Album details	Peak chart positions	Sales
Title	Album details	KOR	Sales
Escape To Hangover (일탈다반사)	Released: May 27, 2015; Label: CJ E&M; Formats: CD, digital download; Track listing: 1. Holiday Song (연휴 Song); 2. Sunset; 3. OMG; 4. Alibi; 5. Office; 6. X Like You (너란 X); 7. First Impression (첫느낌); 8. Lizard (도마뱀)	5	—N/a
Drug Restaurant	Released: Digital release: May 27, 2016; Physical release: June 9, 2016; Label: C9 Entertainment, LOEN Entertainment; Formats: CD, digital download; Track listing: 1. Intro; 2. Mistake; 3. Sexy Bomb; 4. What?!; 5. When the Money's Back	7	KOR: 5,221+
Pomade	Released: Digital release: August 4, 2017; Physical release: August 8, 2017; Label: C9 Entertainment, LOEN Entertainment; Formats: CD, digital download; Track listing: 1. Don't Be Afraid; 2. Drink O2 in the Water; 3. Ain't I Good to You?; 4. Starved; 5. Escaper; 6. Catwoman; 7. Ain't I Good to You? (Piano demo version) (Bonus track)	16	KOR: 3,859+

=== Singles ===
Title	Year	Peak chart positions	Sales	Album
Title	Year	KOR	Sales	Album
"OMG"	2015	—	—N/a	Escape to Hangover
"Mistake"	2016	—	—N/a	Drug Restaurant
"Drink O2 in the Water"	2017	—	—N/a	Pomade
"Ain't I Good to You?"	2017	—	—N/a	Pomade
"Her"	2018	—	—N/a	Non-album singles
"403"	2018	—	—N/a	Non-album singles
"—" denotes releases that did not chart.

== Awards and nominations ==
Year	Award	Category	Result	Ref.
2015	17th Mnet Asian Music Awards	Best Band Performance	Nominated	
2015	17th Mnet Asian Music Awards	Union Pay Song of the Year ("OMG")	Nominated	

== Concert tour and live performances ==
2015

- JJY Band @ Live Club Day
- JJY Band @ Live Club Day (Halloween Show)
- JJY Band's Live & Talk 2015 "Attention" Concert in Tokyo, Shanghai, and Seoul

2016

- JJY Band Live @ Rolling Hall 21st Anniversary
- JJY Band's Live & Talk 2016 "Attention" Concert in Daejeon, Busan, and Seoul
- JJY Band's Bugs TV Special Live Vol.14
- JJY Band Live @ Seoul Food Festival
- Drug Restaurant's Live Tour Concert in Seoul, Busan, Gwangju and Daegu
- REAL LIVE Concert Drug Restaurant x Pia Band in Seoul

2017

- Jung Joon Young Live Concert with Drug Restaurant in Seoul, Daegu and Daejeon
- Jung Joon Young Live Concert with Drug Restaurant in Taipei
- Rockstar Crew Concert 2017
- Jung Joon Young "Me & You" Concert with Drug Restaurant in Tokyo
- Drug Restaurant "I Hate Summer" Concert in Seoul
- Drug Restaurant Europe Tour 2017

2018

- JJY × Drug Restaurant Europe Concert Tour 2018 at Paris, Düsseldorf, Amsterdam and Lisbon
- JJY × Drug Restaurant with BJR US Live Tour at Chicago, Dallas, New York and San Juan
