= 1st Mini Album (Jung Joon-young EP) =

EP by Jung Joon-young
- Released: October 10, 2013
- Recorded: 2013
- Genres: Pop; rock
- Length: 26:13
- Language: Korean
- Label: CJ E&M

Jung Joon-young chronology
1st Mini Album (2013)	Teenager (2014)

Singles from 1st Mini Album
- 1. "Spotless Mind" Released: October 1, 2013; 2. "The Sense of an Ending" Released: October 10, 2013

1st Mini Album is the debut EP by South Korean rock singer Jung Joon-young, released by CJ E&M on October 10, 2013. It consists of six songs including the pre-release single "Spotless Mind" (병이에요), the title track, "The Sense of an Ending" (이별 10분 전), and two songs that he participated in writing and composing: "Missed Call" (아는 번호) and "Take Off Mask".

1st Mini Album performed well commercially; the EP ranked at the top spot both on the daily and weekly chart of Synnara Record as a bestselling album during its first week and it sold over 12,804 copies from October until the end of 2013 in Korea. "Spotless Mind" also landed at third place and "The Sense of an Ending" also took the second place on the chart of MBC's music show Music Core.

Jung received the award for New Male Solo Artist for "The Sense of an Ending" at the 3rd Gaon Chart K-Pop Awards.

== Background and release ==
On April 21, 2013, it was announced that CJ E&M signed with Jung Joon Young on April 20 and they were supposed to release his debut album at the earliest that summer of the year. However, it was delayed until October due to his passion to make it perfect and it was referred that it took a pretty long time for him to select the best songs he could be satisfied with.

It was described that he participated actively in producing his 1st Mini Album especially making N version of "병이에요 (Spotless Mind)" MV and album photos through the reality show Be Stupid.

On Oct 01, 2013. Jung Joon-young released his single "Spotless Mind", a pre-released title track off his upcoming album, along with two versions of the music video ("N" version and "S" version). Just an hour after release, "Spotless Mind" immediately made an impact on the country's charts and nabbed the top spot on Mnet, Bugs, and Soribada.

Soon after, 1st Mini Album was released on October 10 of that year.

== Promotion ==
Jung Joon-young unveiled the detailed story behind the making of his album and the great effort for working on his album through On Style's reality show, "Jung Joon-young's Be Stupid" which aired four episodes from Sep 10 to Oct 1, 2013.

On October 4, he revealed the track list of 1st Mini Album through the graffiti mural on a wall near Hongik University with the help of art students.

On Oct 10, he held a showcase to celebrate the release of 1st Mini Album, and started his official activities as a singer by making his debut show performance of the title track "이별 10분전 (The Sense of an Ending)" through Mnet’s "M Countdown". He promoted the title track "이별 10분전 (The Sense of an Ending)", along with the track "병이에요 (Spotless Mind)" on music shows such as Mnet's M! Countdown, KBS's Music Bank and MBC's Show! Champion from October 10 to November 12.

He met many fans through signing events not only domestically but also abroad. He visited Taiwan in order to promote his first mini album on December 8, 2013, and held a fan meeting with 1,000 Taiwanese fans and had an autograph-signing event with his song performances for those who had purchased a special limited edition of his album.

== Composition and singles ==
He reportedly devoted much effort and time to his first mini-album. He attended many meetings with the staff to include his unique colors into the album. So he mentioned that "I hope that people will be able to see every side to the album, and not just the title song and pre-released song" through the interview with YesAsia. According to his agency CJ E&M, "We have paid special attention to the sound of the album. In contrast to the mechanical sound that is currently in, we gathered some of the best engineers in Korea into the studio, and went for a sound that makes you feel like you’re listening to live music. Colorful rock music with a high quality sound is the core of this album."

"Spotless Mind" (병이에요), written by Luvan and Wonderkid, tells a story of a young man struggling to cope with the aftereffects of a painful break-up. The track is a song that highlights Jung Joon Young's deep emotional voice with a rock ballad sound. The name of the track was inspired by the American movie Eternal Sunshine on the Spotless Mind, which takes listeners on a movie-like experience with his imaginative and sorrowful melody and lyrics. A representative for the singer stated, "Jung Joon-young has strong opinions and also has a love for rock, which is reflected directly in his debut single. Through his music listeners would be able to know what kind of person Jung is, and what kind of music he would like to play."

The title song is a rock ballad called "The Sense of an Ending" (이별10분전). The song was produced by SCORE, who previously worked with artists such as Younha and Primary, and emphasizes Jung Joon Young's deep husky voice and a live band sound. The song features sad lyrics and Jung Joon Young's poignant vocals, just in time for the chilly autumn weather. According to Jung Joon Young, "We tried to minimize the electronic sound, and instead tried to create an authentic sound, as if you are listening to a live band. This song features a man's emotional voice as he looks forward to a farewell, and hopefully brings back the male vocal's rock ballad genre. We wanted to preserve the classic aspect of the genre, as well as tastefully develop it into a song to fit in with 2013's modern sound."

He proved his ability as a musician by participating in composing and writing lyrics on two songs. He composed the western style rock song "Take Off Mask" with Lee Ji Hoon, which features his unique musical style and slightly exaggerates his vocal color. He also participated in writing lyrics and composing the rock ballad "Missed Call" (아는 번호), which expresses the depressed feeling of a man who still misses a former girlfriend with a dark and sad melody and lyrics. It combines a band sound and orchestra sound perfectly.

"Be Stupid" is an upbeat song with a rock punk beat that includes a Japanese rock feeling. It expresses living a free, easy-going, and self-satisfied life. "Really?" (정말?) is a bright pop rock song with a band sound that blends string arrangements.

== Track listing ==
No.	Title	Lyrics	Music	Length
1.	"Spotless Mind" (병이에요)	Luvan	Luvan, Wonderkid	4:02
2.	"Really?" (정말?)	Park Ahser	Park Ahser	5:06
3.	"The Sense of an Ending" (이별10분전)	Score, Yang Jae Sun	Score	4:25
4.	"Be Stupid"	Luvan, 77Children	Score	4:05
5.	"Missed Call" (아는 번호)	Jung Joon-young, Park Ahser	Jung Joon-young, Lee Ji Hoon	4:38
6.	"Take Off Mask"	Zito of Soul Dive	Jung Joon-young, Lee Ji Hoon	3:57
Total length:				26:13

== Charts ==
=== Album ===
Chart	Peak position
Gaon Weekly album chart	5
Gaon Monthly album chart	10

=== Singles ===
"Spotless Mind"

Chart	Peak position
Gaon Weekly digital chart	3

The Sense of an Ending"

Chart	Peak position
Gaon Weekly digital chart	5

== Sales ==
Chart	Sales
Gaon physical sales	12,804

== Release history ==
Country	Date	Format	Label
South Korea	October 10, 2013	CD, digital download	CJ E&M
