= You Hee-yeol's Sketchbook =

South Korean television program

- Hangul: 유희열의 스케치북
- RR: Yu Huiyeorui seukechibuk
- MR: Yu Hŭiyŏrŭi sŭk'ech'ibuk
- Genre: Variety show
- Presented by: You Hee-yeol
- Opening theme: "Homage Pat Metheny"
- Country of origin: South Korea
- Original language: Korean
- No. of seasons: 10
- No. of episodes: 600 (list of episodes)

Production
- Executive producer: Park Hyo-gyu
- Producers: Lee Se-hui, Choi Jae-hyung
- Production location: South Korea
- Running time: 80 minutes

Original release
- Network: KBS2
- Release: April 24, 2009 – July 22, 2022

You Hee-yeol's Sketchbook (Korean: 유희열의 스케치북) is a South Korean talk show and live music television program airing from April 24, 2009, until July 22, 2022. It was hosted by You Hee-yeol, also known as his one-man band, Toy. The program has aired since April 24, 2009.

On July 18, 2022, it was announced the show would end after 13 years, with the final episode being filmed the following day.

== Format ==
You Hee-yeol's Sketchbook aired on KBS2 every Friday at 11:20pm KST and has a running time of about 80 minutes. Each week, musicians (usually 3–4) appear as guests to perform and talk with the MC You Hee-yeol for 10–15 minutes.

== Airtime ==
Air Date	Air Time (KST)	Running Time
Air on Every Friday		85 Minutes
April 24, 2009 – October 7, 2010	00:25 – 01:50	85 Minutes
Air on Every Saturday		85 Minutes
October 22, 2016 – June 9, 2018	00:00 – 01:25	85 Minutes
July 21 – September 1, 2018	20:45 – 00:10	85 Minutes
Air on Every Friday		85 Minutes
September 7 – October 26, 2018	00:40 – 02:05	85 Minutes
November 2–9, 2018	00:50 – 02:15	85 Minutes
November 16–23, 2018	00:10 – 01:30	80 Minutes
November 30, 2018 – January 18, 2019	00:25 – 01:45	80 Minutes
January 25, 2019	23:15 – 00:35	80 Minutes
February 8, 2019	00:20 – 01:40	80 Minutes
February 15, 2019 – July 22, 2022	23:20 – 00:40	80 Minutes

== List of episodes ==
=== 2009 ===
List of guests 2009

No.	Guests	Original air date
1	Lee Seung-hwan, Lee Sora, Sister's Barbershop, Kim Jang-hoon	April 24, 2009
2	Uhm Jung-hwa, Yoon Jong-shin, Kim Jang-hoon, Oh Ji-eun, Jo Sung-mo	May 1, 2009
3	Shin Dong-yup, Insooni, Common Ground, Yurisangja	May 8, 2009
4	Bobby Kim, Lyn, H-Eugene, Kim Jang-hoon, SG Wannabe, Jisun	May 15, 2009
5	Kim Jin-pyo, Younha, Kara, Giovanni Allevi, Mate	May 22, 2009
6	Bom Yeoreum Gaeul Kyeoul, Wheesung, Linus's Blanket, UPT	June 5, 2009
7	Lena Park, V.O.S, Park Ji-yoon, Phonebooth	June 12, 2009
8	Kiha & The Faces, Kim Chang-wan Band, Crying Nut, Park Myeong-su, Yoo Jae-suk, K.Will	June 19, 2009
9	MC the Max, Lee Beom-soo, Jung Hoon-hee, Super Kidd	June 26, 2009
10	Lee Seung-chul, Park Kyung-lim, Jang Na-ra, Lee Soo-young, IU	July 3, 2009
11	No Brain, 2NE1, Lee Jung-hyun, Yoo Seung-chan	July 10, 2009
12	Yoo Young-seok, Kyuhyun (Super Junior), Kim Gun-mo, House Rulez, Wax, Fighting Daddy	July 17, 2009
13	Yoon Sang, Joe Won-sun, Bulnabang Star Sausage Club, Illak	July 24, 2009
14	Drunken Tiger, Yoon Mi-rae, Yoon Do-hyun, Windy City, 4Minute, Cool, GOGOSTAR, Girls' Generation	July 31, 2009
15	MC Mong, Koh Eugene, Winterplay, F.T. Island	August 7, 2009
16	Clazziquai, Eun Ji-won & Gilme, Oksu Sajinkwan, Lee Eun-mi	August 14, 2009
17	DJ Koo, Jaurim, Dynamic Duo & Supreme Team, Crying Nut, Dear Cloud	August 28, 2009
18	Hwayobi, Mate, Oh Ji-eun, Super Kidd	September 4, 2009
19	Kim Bum-soo, Kim Yeon-woo, Jung-in, Jung-yup (Brown Eyed Soul)	September 11, 2009
20	Tei, Baek Ji-young & Taecyeon (2PM), No Reply, Beige	September 18, 2009
21	Sweet Sorrow, Boohwal, Hong Jin-kyung & Alex (Clazziquai)	September 25, 2009
22	Park Hyo-shin, Lee Seung-chul, Lee Byung-woo, Woo Jung-hoon	October 9, 2009
23	Lee Moon-se, Lee Sun-kyun, Jung Won-young Band	October 16, 2009
24	Mariah Carey, Leessang, Wheesung, Big Queens	October 23, 2009
25	Lee Soo-young, The Moonshiners & Playgirl, Gavy NJ, Loveholics	October 30, 2009
26	MC Mong, Taru, Maya, December	November 6, 2009
27	Shin Seung-hun, ALi, SHINee	November 13, 2009
28	Kim Tae-woo, Lee Young-hyun (Big Mama), K.Will, Naomi	November 20, 2009
29	Hwanhee (Fly to the Sky), Lee Seung-hwan, My Aunt Mary	November 27, 2009
30	SeeYa, Yurisangja, Jang Hye-jin, H-Eugene	December 4, 2009
31	Bobby Kim, Younha, Lucid Fall	December 11, 2009
32	Eun Ji-won, Kim Kwang-jin, Clazziquai, Deevine	December 18, 2009
33	Gummy, Shin Seung-hun, Kiha & The Faces	December 25, 2009

=== 2010 ===
List of guests 2010

No.	Guests	Original air date
34	Leessang, Drunken Tiger & Yoon Mi-rae, IU, MC Sniper	January 1, 2010
35	JYP, Alice in Neverland, Kim Jung-min	January 8, 2010
36	Brian (Fly to the Sky), Supreme Team, Lyn, Peppertones, K.Will, Mario	January 15, 2010
37	Kim Jang-hoon, Psy, Lee Jae-hoon (Cool)	January 22, 2010
38	After School, Kim Jin-pyo, Ra.D, KCM	January 29, 2010
39	2AM, Kim Yeon-woo, Casker, AB Avenue	February 5, 2010
40	Min Kyung-hoon (Buzz), 2PM, Dear Cloud, 4men	February 12, 2010
41	Kim Kwang-min, Lyn, No Young-shim, Jung-yup (Brown Eyed Soul), Kai, Yiruma, Bobby Kim	February 19, 2010
42	Kim Jong Kook, Lucid Fall, Lisa, Shin Jihoo	February 26, 2010
43	Outsider, Park Hyun-bin, E Z Hyoung, Lee Young-hyun (Big Mama), Shin Yong-jae (4Men)	May 5, 2010
44	Jung-in, Lee Juck, Na Yoon-kwon, Epik High, An Jin-kyoung	May 12, 2010
45	Cho PD, Insooni, K.Will, Eun Ji-won, OKDAL, Mr. 2	May 19, 2010
46	Yoon Jong-shin, T-ara, M4, December	May 26, 2010
47	Boohwal, Supreme Team, Jung-in, Zoo	April 30, 2010
48	Girls' Generation, Hot Potato, Defconn, TaeSaBiAe, Park Sae-byul	May 7, 2010
49	Bobby Kim, Lee Hyori, Daesung (Big Bang), Yoo Seung-chan, Lucid Fall	May 14, 2010
50	Rain, Gummy, Lucid Fall, Jung Jae-hyung	May 21, 2010
51	Kim Yoon-ah, Norazo, Lucid Fall, Mate	May 28, 2010
52	Wonder Girls, Lyn, Lucid Fall, Rumble Fish	June 4, 2010
53	Lee Seung-hwan, Lucid Fall, December, 10cm	June 11, 2010
54	Hwayobi, Lucid Fall, Jeon Je-duk, Park Joo-won, Lee Seok-hoon (SG Wannabe)	June 18, 2010
55	Verandah Project, Lucid Fall, Flower, Vanilla Lucy	June 25, 2010
56	Vibe, Lucid Fall, Seo Young-eun, Jung-yup (Brown Eyed Soul)	June 2, 2010
57	Bobby Kim, Double K, Kil Hakmi, Park Jiman, Yoon Sang, Lee Jiyoung, 8Eight	June 9, 2010
58	Taeyang, G-Dragon, Cho Kyuchan, Hey, BMK	June 16, 2010
59	Super Junior, JK Kim Dong-wook, Miss A	June 23, 2010
60	DJ DOC, Cultwo, Kim Kwang-min, Lee Byung-woo, Yoon Sang	June 30, 2010
61	V.O.S, Monday Kiz, Park Seung-hwa (Yurisangja), ALi, Chess	August 6, 2010
62	YB, Yoon Jong-shin, WoongSan	August 13, 2010
63	Seven, Eun Ji-won, GilMe, K.Will, Zia, J2	August 20, 2010
64	Hwanhee (Fly to the Sky), Jo Sung-mo, Navi, Dia	August 27, 2010
65	Wheesung, Ukulele Picnic, Sohi, Hareem, Lee Han-cheol	September 10, 2010
66	Kim Jong-seo, Seo In-guk, Daybreak	September 17, 2010
67	Lee Seung-chul, DJ DOC, Vibe, Lee Young-hyun (Big Mama), Jung-yup (Brown Eyed Soul), Taeyang, Super Junior, Seven, Kim Jang-hoon	September 24, 2010
68	2NE1, Sung Si-kyung, Suh Young-eun	October 1, 2010
69	Lee Juck, Kim Bum-soo, Yozoh, Jaejoo Boys	October 8, 2010
70	BoA, Younha, Park Ki-young	October 15, 2010
71	Hwayobi, Han Hyo-joo, No Reply, Beige, Sunwoo, Kim Ryeowook (Super Junior)	October 22, 2010
72	SG Wannabe, Supreme Team, Sunday Brunch, Lee Young-hyun (Big Mama)	October 29, 2010
73	Kim Jang-hoon, Kim Wan-je, Jung-yup (Brown Eyed Soul, Echo Bridge, Groove All Stars	November 5, 2010
74	Shin Seung-hun, Nabi, ALi, Tam Tam, Lee Soo-geun, Eun Ji-won, Broccoli, you too, Suk-hui	November 12, 2010
75	Lena Park, Shin Mun-hui, Psy	November 19, 2010
76	Yang Dong-geun, Gong Yoo, 4Men	December 3, 2010
77	Lyn, Sweet Sorrow, Park Sae-byul, Lee Juck	December 10, 2010
78	Park Jin-young, Miss A, Younha, Bobby Kim, Wheesung, Gummy,	December 17, 2010
79	Lee Juck, Jung-yup (Brown Eyed Soul, Kiha & The Faces, Jung Jae-hyung, Jang Yoon-ju, Lee Young-hyun (Big Mama), Kim Bum-soo, Lee Eun-gyeol	December 24, 2010

=== 2011 ===
List of guests 2011

No.	Guests	Original air date
80	SG Wannabe, Lee Hae-ri, Sohyang, Kim Kwang-min, ALi, Guckkasten	January 7, 2011
81	Yoon Jong-shin, JeA (Brown Eyed Girls), Miryo (Brown Eyed Girls), Jung-in, JoMungeun	January 14, 2011
82	Boohwal, Park Wan-kyu, Piggy Dolls, Kim Yeon-woo, Kim Hyun-joong, Byun Jae-won	January 21, 2011
83	Lee So-ra, G.O (MBLAQ), Kim Sung-kyu (Infinite (band)), Nabi, Hyolyn (Sistar)	January 28, 2011
84	Supreme Team, One More Chance, Monday Kiz	February 11, 2011
85	DJ DOC, Bye Bye Sea, Jien-ei	February 18, 2011
86	Kim Jang-hoon, MC Sniper, Yozoh	February 25, 2011
87	Bobby Kim, Kim Gyu-ri, Park Hye-kyeong, DickPunks	March 4, 2011
88	IU, 10cm, M4	March 11, 2011
89	Crying Nut, Hong Kyung-min, K.Will, Kim Bo-kyung	March 18, 2011
90	Insooni, Mate	March 25, 2011
91	Eun Ji-won, GilMe, Typhoon, Wheesung, Babara	April 1, 2011
92	SG Wannabe, Mongni, Kim Tae-woo (g.o.d),	April 8, 2011
93	Leessang, Jung-in, U-KISS, No Brain	April 15, 2011
94	CNBLUE, Na Yoon-kwon, ALi	April 22, 2011
95	Boohwal, UV, T-max, NS Yoon-G	April 29, 2011
96	Lee Sun-hee, Primary, Supreme Team, Yankie, Handsome People	May 6, 2011
97	Kim Hyeong-seok, Kim Jo-han, Sung Si-kyung, Na Yoon-kwon, Brave Brothers, After School, Sistar, Cho Young-soo, Lee Ki-chan, Haha, Kim Jin-ho	May 13, 2011
98	Lucid Fall, Jung Jae-hyung, Peppertones, Park Sae-byul, DJ DOC, 45 rpm, Vasco, Kiha & The Faces, Sultan of the Disco, Nunco Band, Joe Carlos	May 20, 2011
99	Jung-yup (Brown Eyed Soul, Baek Ji-young, Sweet Sorrow, Yurisangja, Suh Young-eun, Lucid Fall, Yesung (Super Junior), Clazziquai, Cha Soo-kyung	May 27, 2011
100	Choi Baek-ho, Han Young-Ae, Yoon Jong-shin, Kim Gun-mo, Lee Juck, Hwayobi, IU, Insooni, Lucid Fall	June 3, 2011
101	Baek Ji-young, Kiha & The Faces, Yurisangja, Suh Young-eun, Kim Greem, Jang Jae-in	June 17, 2011
102	Alex (Clazziquai), Secret, 4Men, Rimi and Gamja	June 24, 2011
103	Kim Yeon-woo, Norazo, Thomas Cook, Monday Kiz	July 1, 2011
104	Sweet Sorrow, Jung-in, Min Kyung-hoon (Buzz), Young-ji, Dear Cloud	July 8, 2011
105	Kim Jong-kook, Mickey Turbo, Sweet Sorrow, Jung-in, Nabi, Rumble Fish	July 15, 2011
106	Kim Kwang-min, Lee Byung-woo, Yun-sang, IU, Sweet Sorrow, Jung-in, Mighty Mouth, Rooftop Moonlight	July 22, 2011
107	015B, Yoon Jong-shin, Sweet Sorrow, Jung-in, Lyn, The Koxx	July 29, 2011
108	Jung Jae-hyung, Lee Byung-woo, Sung Si-kyung, Homme, The Black Skirts	August 5, 2011
109	Cha Ji-yeon, Lee Byung-woo, Sung Si-kyung, Kiha & The Faces, Brave Girls	August 12, 2011
110	Dynamic Duo, Lee Byung-woo, Sung Si-kyung, Sistar, Seo In-guk	August 19, 2011
111	UV, Lee Byung-woo, Sung Si-kyung, Can, Hwanhee (Fly to the Sky)	August 26, 2011
112	Leessang, Sung Si-kyung, J-Cera, Ailin, Piggy Dolls, BGH to	September 9, 2011
113	BMK, Sung Si-kyung, ALi, Sweet Revenge	September 16, 2011
114	Sung Si-kyung, Kim Bum-soo, Huh Gak, Suk-hui	September 23, 2011
115	Lee Moon-se, Super Junior, 45 rpm, DJ DOC	September 30, 2011
116	Kim Gun-mo, Lee Seok-hoon (SG Wannabe), Jeong Su-wan (Serengeti), Brown Eyed Girls, Verbal Jint, The Black Skirts, Cho Hyun-ah(Urban Zakapa), Fat Cat	October 7, 2011
117	Kim Jang-hoon, Lee Seok-hoon (SG Wannabe), Jeong Su-wan (Serengeti), Park Wan-Kyu, Yoon Hyeong-bin, MayBee, Kim Bo-kyung	October 14, 2011
118	Kim Jo-han, Lee Seok-hoon (SG Wannabe), Jeong Su-wan (Serengeti), F.T. Island, Wooden Bike, Crispi Crunch	October 21, 2011
119	Jung-yup (Brown Eyed Soul, Sung-hoon, Lee Seok-hoon (SG Wannabe), Jeong Su-wan (Serengeti), Koh Yoo-jin, Haha	October 28, 2011
120	Simon Dominic, Ham Chun-ho, John Park, Noeul, Shin Yong-jae (4men), Han Ji-eun	November 11, 2011
121	Lena Park, Sung Si-kyung, Ham Chun-ho, John Park, Son Hoyoung (g.o.d), Ibadi	November 18, 2011
122	Lee Seung-gi, Sumi Jo, Ham Chun-ho, John Park, Wonder Girls	November 25, 2011
123	Lee So-ra, Kim Bum-soo, Girls' Generation, Ham Chun-ho, John Park, Tim	December 2, 2011
124	Kim Dong-ryool, Ham Chun-ho, ALi, Kim Yeon-woo, Park Ju-won, Electroboyz	December 9, 2011
125	IU, Ham Chun-ho, ALi, Cho Kyu-chan, Dynamic Duo	December 16, 2011
126	Jung Jae-hyung, Lucid Fall, Sung Si-kyung, IU, Ham Chun-ho, ALi, Jung-yup (Brown Eyed Soul, Park Ju-won, John Park, Sweet Sorrow	December 23, 2011

=== 2012 ===
List of guests 2012

No.	Guests	Original air date
127	Lucid Fall, Jaurim, Ham Chun-ho, Kim Yeon-woo, Huh Gak	January 6, 2012
128	Kim Won-hyo, Choi Hyo-jong, Shin Bora, Hong Kyung-min, Ham Chun-ho, Kim Yeon-woo, Jung Joon-il, Soul Dive	January 13, 2012
129	Lee Juck, Ham Chun-ho, Kim Yeon-woo, Kim Gun-mo, Lee Moon-se, Lee Seung-gi, Leessang, Kim Bum-soo, Kiha & The Faces, The Musician	January 20, 2012
130	Lee Seung-yeol, DJ Clazzi, Ham Chun-ho, Kim Yeon-woo, Koyote, Deli Spice	January 27, 2012
131	Bobby Kim, Buga Kingz, MY Q, Gong Hyo-jin, Ham Chun-ho, Lyn, F.T. Island	February 10, 2012
132	Sweet Sorrow, Ham Chun-ho, Lyn, Davichi, Evan (Click-B), Eksijeu	February 17, 2012
133	K.Will, Ham Chun-ho, Lyn, Brian (Fly to the Sky), Tiger JK, Jang Jae-in, Kim Hyeong-seok, J. Symphony	February 24, 2012
134	Kim Kyung-ho, John Park, Ji Hyun-woo, Ailee	March 2, 2012
135	Ham Chun-ho, Kang Seung-won, Sung Si-kyung, Insooni, Shinchireem, Park Ji-yoon, Park Ju-won, Oh Yun Hye	March 9, 2012
136	Jo Sung-mo, Lisa, Ham Chun-ho, M4, Shinchireem, J Rabbit, Spica	March 16, 2012
137	Hyun Jin-young, Kim Jo-han, Tony An, SMASH, Sistar, Park Mi-kyung, DJ Koo, Kim Hyun-jung, Norazo, Kim Gun-mo, Kim Min-kyo	March 23, 2012
138	CNBLUE, Shinchireem, Ham Chun-ho, Lyn, Haha, Tau, Bohemian	March 30, 2012
139	Kim Jang-hoon, ALi, Shin Yong-jae (4men), Jatanpung, MC Sniper, Noel	April 6, 2012
140	Jang Yun-jeong, Park Hyun-bin, Lucid Fall, Jo Yun-seong, Shin Yong-jae (4men), Ham Chun-ho, Lucia, M.I.B	April 13, 2012
141	Nell, Urban Zakapa, Shin Yong-jae (4men), Ham Chun-ho, 2BiC	April 20, 2012
142	Yang Dong-geun, Shin Yong-jae (4men), Ham Chun-ho, Ivy, December, Medical Eleven Sound	April 27, 2012
143	Tiger JK, Yoon Mi-rae, Busy, Soran, Electroboyz	May 4, 2012
144	Sung Si-kyung, Kim Bum-soo, John Park, B.A.P	May 11, 2012
145	Seong Jin-woo, REF, Secret, Kim Jong-kook, Haha, So Chan-whee, Suzy (Miss A), Yangpa, Hwang Kyu-young	May 18, 2012
146	IU, Brave Guys, G.NA, Peppertones	May 25, 2012
147	Girls' Generation-TaeTiSeo, Baek Ji-young, Kim Joon-ho, Ccotbyel, Noel	June 1, 2012
148	Leessang, Jung-in, Dynamic Duo, Infinite, My Name	June 15, 2012
149	Boohwal, Kim Jo-han, Jung Yong-hwa (CNBLUE), Juniel, BOB 4	June 22, 2012
150	Kim Jin-pyo, G.NA, Kim Se Hwang (N.EX.T), Sweet Sorrow, Park Myeong-su, Kim Jeong-gyun, Aziatix	June 29, 2012
151	Lena Park, Ko Chan-yong, Younha, Eness Gray	July 6, 2012
152	Bobby Kim, Ailee, Ulala Session, Autumn Vacation	July 13, 2012
153	Kiha & The Faces, Hot Potato, Jang Pil Soon, Nell, Big Star	July 20, 2012
154	Chicago, Yoon Jong-shin, Shin Yong-jae (4men), Sungha Jung, GilMe, Eun Ji-won	July 27, 2012
155	BoA, Boom, Kingston Rudieska, The Koxx, Phantom	August 17, 2012
156	Skull, Haha, Sistar, Verbal Jint, Jang Jae-in, Lumi-L	August 31, 2012
157	Dynamic Duo, Yoon Mi-rae, Tiger JK, Busy, Lee Pek, Mighty Mouth, Rhythm Power, Du bun, KK, Garion, Brave Guys	September 7, 2012
158	Kara, Lee Jang-woo, F.T. Island, Thomas Cook, Rumble Fish	September 14, 2012
159	Eru, Cha Ji-yeon, Zitten, Chaos	September 21, 2012
160	Kim Yeon-woo, Lee Hyun-woo, Lee Soo-young, Yun Sang, Kim Hyeong-seok, Sung Si-kyung, Davichi, Deli Spice, Kim Won-jun, 015B	October 5, 2012
161	Gain (Brown Eyed Girls), Cultwo, Lee Seok-hoon (SG Wannabe), Huh Gak, Zia	October 12, 2012
162	G-Dragon, Crying Nut, Park Shin-yang, 10cm	October 19, 2012
163	K.Will, John Park, Nain, Nabi, Girl's Day	October 26, 2012
164	Lee Juck, Jungyup (Brown Eyed Soul), Verbal Jint, Jung Eun-ji (Apink), Sweet Sorrow, Kim Geo-ji, Kim Gun-mo, Bom Yeoreum Gaeul Kyeoul	November 2, 2012
165	Kim Jong-kook, 2AM, Hot Potato, EXID	November 9, 2012
166	Epik High, Primary, Dynamic Duo, Zion.T, Ailee, LEDApple	November 16, 2012
167	Bobby Kim, Kim Tae-woo, Son Dam-bi, Urban Zakapa, D-Unit	November 23, 2012
168	Lee Seung-gi, Lena Park, Kim Bum-soo, Noel	November 30, 2012
169	Park Jin-young, Kim Yeon-woo, Yurisangja, Big Star	December 7, 2012
170	Yo-seob (Beast, Sweet Sorrow, Peppertones, Juniel, The SeeYa	December 14, 2012
171	Kim Gun-mo, Sung Si-kyung, Kim Jo-han, Lena Park, Shinchireem, 10cm, Gain (Brown Eyed Girls), Hyolyn (Sistar), K.Will, Sweet Sorrow, Kim Jun-hyun	December 21, 2012

=== 2013 ===
List of guests 2013

No.	Guests	Original air date
172	Jang Yoon-ju, JeA, Sonya, Sunny Hill	January 4, 2013
173	Baek Ji-young, Yiruma, Jungyup (Brown Eyed Soul), December, 100%	January 11, 2013
174	Girls' Generation, Kim Ki-yeol, Lee Ji-hyeon, Born Kim	January 18, 2013
175	CNBLUE, Lee Byung-woo, Lee Juck, Phantom, Hi.ni	January 25, 2013
176	Baechigi, Ailee, 4men, Infinite H, ALi	February 1, 2013
177	Sistar19, Brave Brothers, Huh Gak, Shinsadong Tiger, Choi Gyu-sung, Bak Hye-gyeong, Yoon Il-sang, DMTN, Duble Sidekick	February 15, 2013
178	Cha Tae-hyun, Hong Kyung-min, Hyungdon and Daejun, Clazziquai, VIXX	February 22, 2013
179	SHINee, Kim Tae-woo, Coffee Boy, Jang Hee-young, Kim Bo-kyung	March 8, 2013
180	2AM, Verbal Jint, Kim Jin-ho, Rainbow	March 15, 2013
181	Yoo Jun-sang, Lim Jeong-hee, Herz Analog, U-KISS, Yun Seok Cheol Trio	March 22, 2013
182	Moon Hee-joon (H.O.T.), Infinite, Brave Guys, Len Mino	March 29, 2013
183	ZE:A FIVE, The Position, Davichi, ELECTRO BOYZ	April 5, 2013
184	Son Hoyoung, Kim Tae-woo, K.Will, Kiha & The Faces, Sunny Days (band)	April 12, 2013
185	10cm, John Park, Ra.D, Younha, Kim Yeon-woo, Coffee Boy, Ryu Hyun-kyung, Primary, Zion.T, Choiza, Shin Yong-jae (4men)	April 19, 2013
186	Harim, Jung Jae-hyung, Yun Sang, Gummy, Kim Seung-woo, Kim Jo-han, As One, Skull, Lee Hong-gi, Urban Zakapa	April 26, 2013
187	Rooftop Moonlight, Broccoli, you too, Sweet Sorrow, Sistar, Kingston Rudieska, Seo In-guk, Buga Kingz, GB9, Alex (Clazziquai), Horan	May 3, 2013
188	Lyn, Yoon Gun (Brown Eyes), Younha, Geeks	May 10, 2013
189	Yoon Jong-shin, 2PM, Windy City, Lumi-L	May 24, 2013
190	Lee Hyori, SALTNPAPER, B1A4, Wonder Boyz	June 7, 2013
191	Jeong Jun-ha, Lee Ki-chan, Vibe, Dia	June 14, 2013
192	Sistar, Shin Sung-woo, Min Young-ki, Um Ki-joon, Kim Beop-rae, Daybreak	June 21, 2013
193	Lee Seung-chul, Skull, Haha, Park Sae-byul, Ryu Ki, Kim Se-hwang (N.EX.T)	June 28, 2013
194	YB, Yun Sang, Rose Motel, Lim Kim	July 5, 2013
195	Roy Kim, Dynamic Duo, Dear Cloud, Crayon Pop	July 12, 2013
196	Crying Nut, John Park, Ailee, 2eyes	July 19, 2013
197	Jo Jung-chi, Beast, Pia	July 26, 2013
198	Kim Hyun-joong, Ock Joo-hyun, Bye Bye Sea, Im Seon-young	August 9, 2013
199	Lee Seung-hwan, Sung Si-kyung, IU, Lucid Fall	August 16, 2013
200	Lee Hyori, Yoon Do-hyun, Lena Park, Chang Kiha, Romantic Punch, Kim Dae-jung, eAeon (Mot), Seonwoo Jeonga, Kim Tae-chun	August 23, 2013
201	2NE1, Park Hak-gi, Mr. Mr, Koyote	August 30, 2013
202	G-Dragon, Jang Pil-soon, M.I.B, CollaVoice	September 6, 2013
203	Park Jin-young, Yoon Sang-hyun, Mad Clown, Spica	September 13, 2013
204	Im Chang-jung, Dis Boyz, Sam Hammington, Nabi, Yellow Monsters	September 26, 2013
205	Insooni, Zion.T, Seo In-young, KK	October 4, 2013
206	IU, Na Yoon-sun, Rooftop Moonlight, VIXX	October 11, 2013
207	Jaurim, Yumi, K.Will, Kang Seung-won	October 18, 2013
208	Shin Seung-hun, Kim Bum-soo, Rhythm Power	November 1, 2013
209	Kim Jo-han, Jung-in, Broken Valentine, Baek Seung-heon	November 8, 2013
210	Joo Won, Taeyang, Go! Dandy Boy with Shin Cho-i	November 15, 2013
211	Lee Seung-hwan, Davichi, G.O (MBLAQ), Say Yes	November 22, 2013
212	Waibi, Lena Park, Park Ji-yoon, Kim Hyung-jun, NC.A	November 29, 2013
213	Kim Yeon-woo, Hyolyn (Sistar), Urban Zakapa, N-Sonic	December 6, 2013
214	Bobby Kim, Park Wan-kyu, ALi, Lee Jung, Seo In-guk, F.T. Island, ELECTROBOYZ	December 13, 2013
215	Lee Juck, Yoon Jong-shin, Yuk Jung-wan, Yun Sang	December 20, 2013
216	4Minute, Apink, Miss A, Sung Si-kyung	December 27, 2013

=== 2014 ===
List of guests 2014

No.	Guests	Original air date
217	015B, Huh Gak, Kang Min-kyung, K.Will, Song Eun-i, Juniel, Koyote, VIXX, Jo Kwan-woo, Kim Kwang-jin	January 3, 2014
218	Rain, Younha, Yoo Sung-eun, Kim Jong-seo	January 10, 2014
219	Yoo Jun-sang, Ailee, V.O.S, Mr. Papa, Park Sang-min	January 17, 2014
220	Lee Juck, B1A4, Free Style, Puer Kim	January 24, 2014
221	Cultwo, Yu Taeung, Wi Yang-ho, Girl's Day, Zia, Cold Cherry	February 7, 2014
222	Jeon In-kwon, Wax, Soyou, Junggigo, Airplane	February 28, 2014
223	Rose Motel, B.A.P, Bada Kim, Han Kyung-il	March 7, 2014
224	Girls' Generation, Jung Joon-il, The Nuts, CNBLUE	March 14, 2014
225	2NE1, Im Chang-jung, C-Clown, Taewon, 1PS	March 21, 2014
226	Lee Seung-hwan, MBLAQ, Nell (band), Kiss&Cry	March 28, 2014
227	Kang Seung-won, Lee Juck, John Park, The One, NS Yoon-G, Timber, Seo Ji-an	April 4, 2014
228	Lee Eun-mi, Kim Yeon-woo, Deli Spice, M.I.B	April 11, 2014
229	Lee Gyu-ho, Kim Yuna, Kim Bum-soo, 2NE1, J Rabbit	May 23, 2014
230	Jung Jae-hyung, Baek Ji-young, Fly to the Sky, Akdong Musician	May 30, 2014
231	Lena Park, Simon Dominic, Jay Park, Apink, Junggigo	June 6, 2014
232	Song Hae, Park Gu Yun, Rose Motel, Jin-un, Bora, Soyou, Junggigo, Hwang Soo-kyung, Insooni	June 27, 2014
233	Lee Seung-chul, Taeyang, Gummy	July 11, 2014
234	Dynamic Duo, DJ Premier, Park Hye-kyeong, Suh Young-eun, Fromm	July 18, 2014
235	Henry, Jung Joon-young, Sistar, lalasweet	July 25, 2014
236	Trouble Maker, Beast, Jo Jung-chi, Jung-in, Girl's Day, Infinite, AOA, San E, Raina	August 1, 2014
237	Park Ji-yoon, B1A4, Mose, Daybreak	August 8, 2014
238	Tablo, Younha, Lee Dong-woo, WoongSan, DJ Tukutz, Bumkey, Mamamoo	August 15, 2014
239	Jeoningwon Band and Friends, Beenzino, Peppertones, Homme	August 22, 2014
240	Kim Wan-sun, Taemin, 4men, Rose Motel	August 29, 2014
241	G.O.D	September 5, 2014
242	IU, John Park, Akdong Musician, Jang Pil Soon, Hyungdon and Daejun, Rooftop Moonlight	September 12, 2014
243	Yoon Do-hyun, Winner, Lyn, Kang Heo Dal Lim	September 19, 2014
244	Girls' Generation-TaeTiSeo, Kim Jong-seo, Guckkasten, Puer Kim	October 3, 2014
245	Crying Nut, No Brain, Ailee, Kim Jin-ho	October 10, 2014
246	Gaeko, Zion.T, Kim Kwang-min, Yun Sang, Roy Kim	October 17, 2014
247	Epik High, Kiha & The Faces, Chung Dong-ha, The Boss	October 24, 2014
248	Epitone Project, Seo Taiji, The Barberettes	October 31, 2014
249	Lena Park, Verbal Jint, San E, Swings, Park Myeong-su, Dj Charles, T.L CROW	November 14, 2014
250	Bobby Kim, Urban Zakapa, Mr. Papa, Clara, Crucial Star	November 21, 2014
251	Kim Bum-soo, Apink, Kwon In-ha, Gavy NJ	November 28, 2014
252	Im Chang-jung, 10cm, Hyolyn (Sistar), Ju-yeong, Jo-eun	December 5, 2014
253	Yun Sang, Sung-kyu, Day Bin Key, ALi, Ulala Session, Dia	December 12, 2014
254	Nam Jin, Yun Sang, Shin Min-a, Bobby Kim, Fly to the Sky, Kim Bum-soo, Sung Si-kyung, Gummy, Dynamic Duo, Lena Park, 2AM, Nabi, Sistar, The Barberettes, Park Ji-seon	December 19, 2014

=== 2015 ===
List of guests 2015

No.	Guests	Original air date
255	Buzz, Kim Tae-woo (g.o.d), Koh Sangji Band, Seonwoo Jeonga	January 2, 2015
256	Yang Hee-eun, Noel, Soyou (Sistar), Mad Clown, Shannon	January 9, 2015
257	Yoo Se-yoon, GB9, Nabi, Kim Shin-young, Kim Seung-woo, Sung Yu-bin, Sam Ock	January 16, 2015
258	Kim Jong-hyun (Shinee), Jung Woo, Kang Ha-neul, Jo Bok-rae, Yoon Hyung-joo, NC.A, Hwayobi	January 23, 2015
259	Jung Yong-hwa (CNBLUE), Yang Dong-geun, Moon Myung-jin, Sweden Laundry, Junggigo, Baro (B1A4)	January 30, 2015
260	Davichi, Zion.T, Crush, Jang Hye-jin, Tahiti	February 6, 2015
261	Epik High, 4minute, Sunwoo, Choi Moon-seok	February 13, 2015
262	Hyun Jin-young, Kim Jong-kook, Haha, Cool, Kim Won-jun, So Chan-whee, Kim Hyun-jung, Kim Gun-mo	February 20, 2015
263	Kim Chang Wan Band, Eddy Kim, Soya X KK, My Name	February 27, 2015
264	Shinhwa, Amber (f(x)), Ailee, Jung Jae-won, A.KOR	March 6, 2015
265	Lee Seung-hwan, MC Sniper, Acoustic Collabo	March 13, 2015
266	Cho PD, Bada, Minah (Girl's Day), Yoon Hyun-sang, Joy o'clock	March 20, 2015
267	Baek Ji-young, Song Yu-bin, Norazo, Geeks, Wheein (Mamamoo), Eric Nam	March 27, 2015
268	W & JAS, NC.A, K.Will	April 3, 2015
269	Park Jin-young, Kim Ban-jang, Gummy, Jessi, Shin Ji-soo	April 17, 2015
270	Jinusean, Sandara Park (2NE1), Han-na Chang, Gain (Brown Eyed Girls), Hyukoh	April 24, 2015
271	Yoon Min-soo, Shin Yong-jae (4Men), San E, Lim Kim	May 1, 2015
272	Lee Moon-se, Jung Yong-hwa (CNBLUE), Yang Hee-eun, Tymee, Jeon In-kwon, Tiger JK, Bizzy	May 8, 2015
273	Jungyup (Brown Eyed Soul), EXID, Kim Sung-kyu (Infinite)	May 15, 2015
274	Lee Seung-chul, Kim Young-chul, Jay Park, Gray, Loco	May 22, 2015
275	BoA, Drug Restaurant, Hong Dae-kwang, Yoo Byung-jae	May 29, 2015
276	Big Bang, Yoon Jong-shin, Urban Zakapa	June 5, 2015
277	Roy Kim, Jang Jae-in, Song So-hee, Exo	June 12, 2015
278	Lee Sun-hee, Lee Seung-gi, Rooftop Moonlight	June 19, 2015
279	Sistar, Verbal Jint, Sanchez (Phantom), AOA, The Solutions	June 26, 2015
280	Dok2, Zion.T, Choo Sung-hoon, Sleepy, Song Ji-eun (Secret)	July 3, 2015
281	Mamamoo, Kim Bum-soo, Seo In-young, Jang Jae-in	July 10, 2015
282	Apink, Hong Jin-young, Park Hyun-bin, Kim Tae-woo (g.o.d)	July 17, 2015
283	Infinite, Jessi, Cheetah, DickPunks, A.KOR	July 24, 2015
284	Crying Nut, Jang Yoon-ju, G.Soul, Yoo Seung-woo	July 31, 2015
285	Baechigi, Wonder Girls, Bily Acoustie	August 7, 2015
286	DJ Doc, Sistar, Skull, Haha & San E, Raina, Peppertones, You Hee-yeol	August 14, 2015
287	Idiotape, Simon Dominic, Jay Park, Loco, Lim Kim, Park Ji-yoon, Ailee, UV, Crush, Zico, Gaeko	August 28, 2015
288	SG Wannabe, Girls' Generation, Thornapple, Nop.K	September 4, 2015
289	Baek A-yeon, Im Tae-kyung, Paloalto, Rock N Roll Radio	September 11, 2015
290	CNBLUE, Fly to the Sky, Woo Hye-mi, Plastic	September 18, 2015
291	Soyou (Sistar), Kwon Jung-yeol (10cm), Im Chang-jung, Seenroot	October 2, 2015
292	Basick, Lil Boi, Ailee, Joon-il Jung, Ami	October 9, 2015
293	Kiha & The Faces, Hyukoh, YB	October 16, 2015
294	Kyuhyun (Super Junior), Yoo Jun-sang, ALi, Yoon Sang, Lovelyz	October 30, 2015
295	Brown Eyed Girls, Jay Park, 10cm, Park Bo-ram	November 6, 2015
296	Shin Seung-hun, Younha, Homme, Burstered	November 13, 2015
297	Kim Yeon-woo, Gummy, Johan Kim	November 20, 2015
298	Dynamic Duo, Loco, Gray, Crush, Jessi, San E, Mad Clown	November 27, 2015
299	Psy, Honey Lee, Roy Kim	December 18, 2015
300	Kim Yeon-woo, Yoon Jong-shin, Lena Park, Kim Bum-soo, Gummy, Baek Ji-young, Zion.T, Vibe, EXID	December 25, 2015

=== 2016 ===
List of guests 2016

No.	Guests	Original air date
301	Zico, Babylon, Urban Zakapa, Kim Soo-mi, Park Myeong-su, Yoo Jae-hwan, Hong Jin-young, Byul, Sweet Sorrow	January 1, 2016
302	Turbo, Ock Joo-hyun, Dean	January 8, 2016
303	Jung Yong-hwa (CNBLUE), Seonwoo Jeonga, K.Will, Kim Na-young, Verbal Jint	January 15, 2016
304	V.O.S, 45 rpm, Ravie Nuage, Twice	January 22, 2016
305	Lucid Fall, Jung-in, Kim Ryeowook (Super Junior), Yezi (Fiestar)	January 29, 2016
306	Lucite Tokki, Eddy Kim, Park Won, iKon, Dynamic Duo, Navi, Park So-jin (Girl's Day), Park Bo-ram	February 12, 2016
307	Taeyeon (Girls' Generation), Johan Kim, Winner	February 19, 2016
308	Jo Kwon (2AM), Yeonnamdong Dumb&Dumber, Lee Tae-min (Shinee), Son Seung-yeon	February 26, 2016
309	Jung Joon-young, So Young-eun, Mamamoo, Bye Bye Sea, Big Brain	March 4, 2016
310	Kim Hyeong-seok, Johan Kim, Na Yoon Kwon, Lim Jeong-hee	March 11, 2016
311	Jang Beom Jun (Busker Busker), GFriend, W & Whale W & JAS	March 18, 2016
312	Kim Chang Wan Band, Lee Hi, Eric Nam	March 25, 2016
313	Daybreak, Monni, Red Velvet, Esna	April 1, 2016
314	CNBLUE, Rose Motel, Sung Eun-yoo	April 8, 2016
315	Park Jin-young, Block B, Sosimboys	April 15, 2016
316	Lee Seung Hwan, 10cm, Urban Zakapa, Sultan Of The Disco	April 22, 2016
317	Kim Yoon-ah, Defconn, Sam Kim	April 29, 2016
318	Crush, Vibe, Gummy	May 6, 2016
319	Jung Eun-ji (Apink), Akdong Musician, Moon Jeong-hee, Kwak Jin-eon	May 13, 2016
320	Skull, Haha, AOA, G.Soul, Acoustic Collabo	May 20, 2016
321	Urban Zakapa, HONGCHA (Hong Kyung-min and Cha Tae-hyun), Big Brain, Shin Ji-hoon	May 27, 2016
322	Dean, Son Hoyoung (g.o.d.), Nam Woo-hyun (Infinite), Luna (f(x))	June 3, 2016
323	Sechs Kies, Lee Jin-ah, Broccoli, you too?	June 10, 2016
324	Kiha & The Faces, EXID, Baek A-yeon	June 17, 2016
325	Kim Jong-seo, Park Wan-kyu, Tiffany (Girls' Generation), Jung Key	June 24, 2016
326	Sistar, Baek Yerin, Suran	July 1, 2016
327	Epik High, Guckkasten, Dynamic Duo, Seventeen	July 8, 2016
328	Noel, Seo Ju-kyung, Hong Jin-young, Oh Jin Sung (IZI), Davichi, Jung Sung-ho, Min Kyung-hoon (Buzz), So Chan-whee, Lee Young-hyun (Big Mama), Lee Eun-mi	July 15, 2016
329	John Park, Jay Park, Ugly Duck, Beast, Melody Day	July 22, 2016
330	Kim Yeon-woo, Beenzino, MATILDA	July 29, 2016
331	Roy Kim, Hyuna (4Minute), Song So-hee, F.T. Island	August 5, 2016
332	Baek Ji-young, Nell, BewhY	August 26, 2016
333	Twice, GFriend, Mamamoo, I.O.I	September 2, 2016
334	Im Chang-jung, Han Dong-geun, Bolbbalgan4, Akdong Musician	September 9, 2016
335	Clazziquai, Jungyup (Brown Eyed Soul), Kwon Jin-ah, Three Men With Three Guitars	September 23, 2016
336	Hwayobi, 2PM, Apink, Yoo Seung-woo, Heize, Akdong Musician	September 30, 2016
337	Ailee, Soran, Lee Sejoon, Infinite	October 7, 2016
338	10cm, Davichi, Jinyoung (B1A4), Far East Movement	October 22, 2016
339	Park Hyo-shin	October 29, 2016
340	Kangta (H.O.T.), EXO-CBX, Jay Park, Loco, The Barberettes	November 5, 2016
341	Kyuhyun (Super Junior), Hyolyn (Sistar), Park Seo-joon, Mamamoo, Sweden Laundry	November 12, 2016
342	Kim Gun-mo, SG Wannabe, Park Won	November 19, 2016
343	Yoon Jong-shin, Lucid Fall, Kiha & The Faces, Zion.T, Yozoh	November 26, 2016
344	Hyukoh, Jung Seung-hwan, ALi, KCM	December 3, 2016
345	Jeon In-kwon, Kim Feel, Urban Zakapa, Byun Yo-han, Kim Se-jeong (Gugudan), Seventeen	December 10, 2016
346	Lena Park, Peabo Bryson, S.E.S., Kim Ha-neul, Big Bang	December 17, 2016

=== 2017 ===
List of guests 2017

No.	Guests	Original air date
347	Uhm Jung-hwa, Kang Seung-won, Sung Si-kyung, Jung Yu-mi, Heize, Hello Bonjour	January 7, 2017
348	Bolbbalgan4, Rain, Junggigo, Giriboy, Kim Na-young	January 14, 2017
349	Jung Eun-ji, Yoon Bomi (Apink), BewhY, Noh Sa-yeon, Baek A-yeon, K.Will, Peppertones, Shinhwa	January 21, 2017
350	Dok2, Kim Yoon-ah, Ji Chang-wook, Park Si-hwan	February 4, 2017
351	Jung Joon-young, Jang Hye-jin, Zion.T, Seenroot	February 11, 2017
352	San E, Michael K. Lee, Huh Gak, Jannabi	February 18, 2017
353	Akdong Musician, Jang Beom-jun, Kim Jong-min, John Park, Sweet Sorrow, Twice	February 25, 2017
354	Henry Lau (Super Junior), Park Ji-yoon, Lovelyz, O.WHEN	March 4, 2017
355	Ailee, Thomas Cook, GFriend, Gilgu Bonggu	March 11, 2017
356	Taeyeon (Girls' Generation), Joonil Jung, Mad Clown,	March 18, 2017
357	Jung Jae-hyung, Jung Seung-hwan, Joo Hyun-mi, Kim Kwang-min, Cho Yun-seong, Zion.T	March 25, 2017
358	CNBLUE, Hyungdon and Daejun, BtoB	April 1, 2017
359	Kim Yeon-woo, Sandeul (B1A4), Highlight, Eric Nam, Jeon So-mi (I.O.I), Hong Dae-kwang, Day6	April 8, 2017
360	Lena Park, Car, the garden, EXID, Kim Ji-soo	April 15, 2017
361	Jung Eun-ji(Apink), Car, the garden, Lee Hae-ri (Davichi), Yesung (Super Junior)	April 22, 2017
362	IU, Car, the garden, Hyukoh, Choi Baek-ho	April 29, 2017
363	Han Dong-geun, Yong Jun-hyung (Highlight), Heize, Kwon Jin-ah, Lim Heon-il, iamnot	May 6, 2017
364	Han Dong-geun, Zingo, Kim Jong-hyun (Shinee), Taeyeon (Girls' Generation), No Reply, Charlie & Shinba	May 13, 2017
365	Urban Zakapa, Roy Kim, Samuel Seo, VIXX	May 20, 2017
366	Eric Nam, Eddy Kim, Sam Kim, Kyuhyun (Super Junior), Yurisangja, Lee Juck, Roy Kim, Kim Yeong-cheol, Hong Jin-young, Maktub, Gu Yoon Hoe	May 27, 2017
367	Suran, Loco, Dean, Honne, Sim Hyun-Bo	June 3, 2017
368	Gummy, Sweet Sorrow, F.T. Island, Kim Chung-ha	June 10, 2017
369	Lee Seok-hoon (SG Wannabe), John Park, Eddy Kim, Choi Nakta	June 17, 2017
370	Mamamoo, Park Soo-hong, Daybreak, Jung Key, BABA	June 24, 2017
371	Yoon Jong-shin, Parc Jae-jung, Kim Tae-woo, Hwang Chi-yeul, Gilgu Bonggu, Homme	July 1, 2017
372	Kim Tae-woo, Bolbbalgan4, 20 Years Of Age, Apink	July 8, 2017
373	Sung Si-kyung, Jung Yu-mi, IU, Hyukoh, Jung Jae-hyung, Jung Seung-hwan	July 15, 2017
374	Zico, Hyolyn, Park Myeong-su, Jessi, Jung Jae-hyung, Kisum	July 22, 2017
375	TURBO, Lee Jin-ah, Ji Chang-wook, 2BiC	July 29, 2017
376	Buzz, Jang Pil-soon, Jung Yong-hwa (CNBLUE), Penomeco	August 5, 2017
377	Jaurim, Shin Jung-hyeon tribute, Glen Check	August 12, 2017
378	Loco, BUMZU, Han Dong-geun, Song Yuvin, Baek Ji-young, Gray, Kard	August 19, 2017
379	Tablo, Kim Jong-wan, Ha Dong-kyun, Zico, Crush, Penomeco	August 26, 2017
380	10cm, Bewhy, Yurisangja, Babylon, Kim Chung-ha	September 2, 2017
381	Primary, Sam Kim, Esna, Lee Gi-kwang, Seenroot, Lee Kyu-Ho	September 9, 2017
382	MeloMance, Paul Kim, Sunwoo Jung-ah, CHEEZE, Jannabi, We Are The Night	September 16, 2017

=== 2018 ===
List of guests 2018

No.	Guests	Original air date
383	Lee Juck, Yoon Jong-shin, 015B, Minseo, O.WHEN	January 13, 2018
384	Double V, Jang Deok Cheol, Jang Jane	January 20, 2018
385	Uhm Jung-hwa, Davichi, Sunmi	January 27, 2018
386	MeloMance, Se So Neon, Jeong Se-woon, Voisper	February 3, 2018
387	Kim Hyung-seok, Nick&Sammy, Killagramz, Jung Seung-hwan, Wax	February 25, 2018
388	Kim Sung-kyu, Punch, Lee Hyun (HOMME), 10miles	March 4, 2018
389	MAMAMOO, The East Light, DJ Koo, Noel	March 11, 2018
390	Rhythm Power, Cheon Dan-bi X GB9, Eve	March 17, 2018
391	Jae Chong (Solid), Richard Yongjae O'Neill X Dong-Hyek Lim, Flowsik X Jessi	April 1, 2018
392	UNB, Yong Jun-hyung (Highlight) & 10 cm, FOURever, NeighBro	April 8, 2018
393	Shin Yong-jae (4Men), Bong Tae-gyu, Twice, Kim Hyun Soo (Forte Di Quattro)	April 15, 2018
394	Jung Dong-ha, Eric Nam, Wendy (Red Velvet), Kim Bo Kyung, VROMANCE	April 22, 2018
395	Yang Da Il, Richard Parkers, Sunwoo Jung-a, ADOY, zai.ro (Ahn Jung Jae), Jung Seung Hwan, O3ohn, SORAN	April 29, 2018
396	Hwang Chi-yeul, HAON & VINXEN, O3ohn, Youme	May 6, 2018
397	Lyn X K.Will, Crush, Peppertones	May 13, 2018
398	Kim Yeon-woo, UNI.T, Kwak Jin Eon, Le Ciel	May 20, 2018
399	Hwanhee X Ilhoon (BTOB), Ben, Na Yoon-kwon, Euna Kim X Jeon Min-ju (KHAN)	May 27, 2018
400	Hyukoh, Lee Juck, MeloMance, Jo Hyun-ah (Urban Zakapa), Dynamic Duo, Kwon Jung-yeol (10cm), Yoon Jong-shin, Oh Yeon-joon, IU	June 3, 2018
401	Hyukoh, SHINee, Joe Won Sun, John Park, The Brothers	June 10, 2018
402	Jaurim, Yoon Mi-rae X Tiger JK X Bizzy X Junoflo, Mamamoo, Kriesha Chu, Park Jeong-min	July 21, 2018
403	Roy Kim, Hyolyn, John Park, MeloMance, Lee Jin-ah	July 28, 2018
404	Zico (Block B), Son Dong Woon (Highlight), Yoo Jae Hwan, Seo In Young, Migyo	August 4, 2018
405	Davichi, Vibe, Ben, Jung In, Yang Da Il, Flower, Han Dong Geun	August 11, 2018
406	Sohyang, Jinjoo Lee (DNCE), Microdot, Choiza (Dynamic Duo), DIA, South Club	August 18, 2018
407	Yang Hee Eun, Super Junior D&E, Rooftop Moonlight, Jannabi	August 25, 2018
408	Lena Park, Jo Hyun-ah (Urban Zakapa), Stella Jang, Cheon Danbi	September 1, 2018
409	SG Wannabe, Steve Barakatt, 1415, Rothy	September 8, 2018
410	Sunmi, Jung Dong Ha, Hoya, Lia Kim, Kriesha Chu, Shin Hae Gyeong	September 14, 2018
411	Im Chang-jung, Roy Kim, Hyomin, UNI.T, DKSOUL	September 21, 2018
412	Ahn Jae-wook, Jang Eun Ah, Humming Urban Stereo, Risso, Got7, Gavy NJ	September 28, 2018
413	Gummy, Epitone Project, Babylon, VINXEN, Martin Smith	October 5, 2018
414	Vibe, Eddy Kim, Yang Bang Ean	October 12, 2018
415	UV, Crying Nut, Yang Da Il, Hangzoo,	October 19, 2018
416	LYn, Joonil Jung, Jung Eun Ji (Apink), Son Yeo Eun, George	October 26, 2018
417	Kim Jong Jin (Bom Yeoreum Gaeul Kyeoul), Yoon Do Hyun, Jo Hyun Ah (Urban Zakapa), 10cm, Ha Hyun Woo (Guckkasten), Highlight	November 2, 2018
418	YB, K.Will, Paul Kim, Monsta X	November 9, 2018
419	Kiha & The Faces, Kwak Jin Eon, Park Si Hwan, Seo Eun Kyo (F-ve Dolls)	November 16, 2018
420	Celeb Five, Kim Jo Han, Lena Park, Sam Kim	November 23, 2018
421	Noel, Key (SHINee), Urban Zakapa, Matilda	November 30, 2018
422	NELL, Sunwoo Jung-a, Ben, Coogie	December 7, 2018
423	Younha, Song So-hee & Second Moon, Soulstar, Jinsil	December 14, 2018
424	Choi Baek-ho, Kim Yeon-woo, Yoon Do-hyun, Roy Kim, Ailee, Henry, Sweet Sorrow, The Barberettes, Jannabi, Oh Yeon-joon	December 21, 2018

=== 2019 ===
List of guests 2019

No.	Guests	Original air date
425	Yun DDan DDan, Say Sue Me, Lee Woo, LAYBRICKS, Lee Ba-da, Chungha, O3ohn, ADOY, MAMAMOO	January 4, 2019
426	SORAN, Loopy & Nafla, Jung Seung-hwan & Jeong Dong-hwan (MeloMance), Punch	January 11, 2019
427	Monday Kiz, Mad Clown & Stella Jang, Jung Seung-hwan & Jeong Dong-hwan (MeloMance), Mommy Son, Astro	January 18, 2019
428	Hwang Chi-yeul, Jung Seung-hwan & Sungha Jung, Norazo, Nam Tae-hyun, Giant Pink, Kanto, Yoon Chae-kyung	January 25, 2019
429	Paul Kim, Hanhae & Rhymer, Ben, 1415	February 8, 2019
430	Hwasa (MAMAMOO), Taemin (SHINee), Ben, MOVNING	February 15, 2019
431	Brave Hongcha & Samuel, Yang Da-il, ADOY, Kassy	February 22, 2019
432	Muzie & Yoon Sang, Koyote, Yang Da-il, Jung Dong-hwan, Kang Min-kyung (Davichi)	March 1, 2019
433	10 cm, Hwasa (MAMAMOO), Kim Feel, Haeun and Yosep	March 8, 2019
434	MAMAMOO, Hong Jin-young, Hwasa (MAMAMOO), N.Flying	March 15, 2019
435	Gummy, Jannabi, Hwasa (MAMAMOO), NeighBro	March 22, 2019
436	Jang Beom-jun (Busker Busker), Vibe, Paul Kim, DIA	March 29, 2019
437	Sweet Sorrow, The Barberettes, Paul Kim, GB9, Suran	April 5, 2019
438	Lee Seok-hoon (SG Wannabe), Kim Min-seok (MeloMance), Kim Woo-seok, Chungha, OOSU:HAN	April 12, 2019
439	Jung Seung-hwan, Yurisangja, Chungha, Hwang So-yoon	April 19, 2019
440	Kim Hyun-chul, Crush, Bolbbalgan4, Wussami	April 26, 2019
441	Gray, 10cm, Yang Da-il, jeebanoff	May 3, 2019
442	Ha Dong-kyun, 10cm, Eric Nam, Penomeco	May 10, 2019
443	MFBTY, Gummy, DickPunks, Yoo Seung-woo	May 17, 2019
444	Kim Hyun-chul, Wheein (MAMAMOO), Hwasa (MAMAMOO), Gummy, Kyuhyun (Super Junior), EXID	May 24, 2019
445	Bobby Kim, Sunwoo Jung-a, NC.A, Piano Man	May 31, 2019
446	Jung Jae-hyung, Ju-young Baek, Sandeul, Kim Min-seok (MeloMance) & Seok Chul Yun, Kim Jae-hwan	June 7, 2019
447	Muzie, Kim Tae-woo, Jin-sung, Ben, Paul Kim, Jung Seung-hwan, Bank, So Chan-whee, Greg Priester, Im Chang-jung, Yoon Jong-shin	June 14, 2019
448	Guckkasten, Kim Min-seok (MeloMance) & Seok Chul-yun, Lim Jae-hyun, Loopy & Nafla	June 21, 2019
449	Daybreak, K.Will, Chungha, Hwang In-wook	June 28, 2019
450	Urban Zakapa, K.Will, Ben, Im Han-byeol	July 5, 2019
451	Baek Hyun, Sunwoo Jung-a, Parc Jae-jung, Broccoli You Too	July 12, 2019
452	MeloMance, Younha, Sunwoo Jung-a, SOLE	July 19, 2019
453	Monday Kiz, Monni, Davichi, Song Ha-ye	July 26, 2019
454	So Chan-Whee, Kim Kyung-ho, Park Wan-kyu, Davichi, Juk Jae, Park Bo-ram	August 9, 2019
455	HoooW (Son Ho-young and Kim Tae-woo), Urban Zakapa, RGP, HYNN	August 16, 2019
456	10cm, Urban Zakapa, Red Velvet, SUMIN	August 23, 2019
457	Son Seung-yeon, Lim Jae-hyun, Punch, HYNN, Daybreak, Seen Hyun-hee, HAEUN, Kim Yong-jin	August 30, 2019
458	Im Chang-jung, Daybreak, Epitone Project, Nine9	September 6, 2019
459	Shin Dong-yup, Paul Kim, Hwasa (Mamamoo), Jung Seung-hwan, Gummy; Sunwoo Jung-a, K.Will, Kim Min-seok (MeloMance), Yang Da-il, 10 cm Chungha, Ben, Davichi, Urban Zakapa, Daybreak	September 13, 2019
460	Yoon Jong-shin, Ha Dong-kyun, Bolbbalgan4, Damons Year, O3ohn	September 21, 2019
461	AKMU, Kim Yeon-woo, Jeong Dong-hwan (MeloMance), Kwon Jin-ah, Jessi	September 28, 2019
462	Baek Ji-young, Zico, Kim Yeon-woo, Park Yong-in (Urban Zakapa)	October 4, 2019
463	Fly to the Sky, Paul Kim, Jeong Joon-Il, Vinxen	October 18, 2019
464	Lyn, Car, the Garden, Jeong Joon-Il, NU'EST	October 25, 2019
465	Punch, Jeong Joon-Il, Brown Eyed Girls, Park Sae Byul, Taeyeon (Girls' Generation)	November 1, 2019
466	YB, Peakboy, MeloMance, Punch	November 8, 2019
467	Vibe, Zion.T, Lee Jin-ah, Laybricks	November 15, 2019
468	Kim Hyeon-cheol, Mamamoo, George	November 22, 2019
469	Dynamic Duo, Penomeco, Crush, Muzie, Sweet Sorrow	November 29, 2019
470	Jung Seung-hwan, Baek Ji-young, Noel, Kim Se-jeong (Gugudan), Jun (U-KISS)	December 6, 2019
471	Guckkasten, GB9, Sunwoo Jung-a, Golden	December 13, 2019
472	Gummy, Jung Seung-hwan, 10cm (band), Jeong Joon-Il, Paul Kim, AKMU, Sim Soo-bong, Urban Zakapa, Ben, Kim Yeon-woo	December 20, 2019

=== 2020 ===
List of guests 2020

No.	Guests	Original air date
473	Lee Young-hoon, SoundBox, Hangsuk and Boogiemonster, Davichi, Huckleberry P, Choi Ye-geun Band, South Carnival, Daybreak (band)	January 3, 2020
474	Go Youn-ha, Lucid Fall, Lyn, Soran (band)	January 10, 2020
475	Solar, Kassy, Lyn, SGO, Sultan of the Disco	January 17, 2020
476	Jung Jae-hyung, YOYOMI, Choi Ye-geun Band, Cho Yoon Seung	January 24, 2020
477	Jang Hye-jin, Sechs Kies, Car, the Garden, Voisper	January 31, 2020
478	Lee Hae-ri, Car, the Garden, GFriend, Se So Neon	February 14, 2020
479	Seo Joo Kyung, Hong Jin-young, izi's Oh Jin-Sung, Jung Sungho, Min Kyung-hoon, Lee Young Hyun, Lee Eun-mi, Muzie, Paul Kim, Jung Seung-hwan, Bank, So Chan-whee, Greg Priester, Im Chang-jung, Yoon Jong-shin	February 21, 2020
480	봄빛, Jannabi, Ravi, DinDin, Cheon Dan-bi	February 28, 2020
481	Kim Yeon-ji, Jannabi, Choo Dae-Yeob, Kevin Oh	March 6, 2020
482	Zico, Dvwn, Kwon Jin-ah, Itzy, Yeong Gi	March 13, 2020
483	Lee Seung-chul, Park Bo-gum, Younha, Kwon Soon-kwan, GIFT(Band)	March 20, 2020
484	Hyukoh, Ailee, Park Kyung, Ong Seong-wu	March 27, 2020
485	You Hee-yeol, Toy, K.Will, Jung Eun-ji (Apink), Sunwoo Jung-a, Park Hyun-bin, Verandah Project, Kim Dong-ryul, Lee Sang-soon, Park Hak-ki, Park Jung-yeon, Jang Beom-june, Lee Moon-sae, Jung Yong-hwa, Bolbbalgan4, Daybreak, Sung Si-kyung, Urban Zakapa, Lucid Fall, Chang Kiha, High4, IU, 10cm	April 3, 2020
486	Mariah Carey, Henry, Baek Ye-rin, Kim Jong-min, Park Bo-gum, Hyungdon and Daejun, IU, Lee Seok-hoon, Shinee, Ailee, Jung Seung-hwan, Kim Yeon-woo, Park Hyo-shin, Lee Peak, Lia, Gummy, DickPunks, Zico, Lee Jin-ah, Jung-hyun, Girls' Generation-TTS	April 10, 2020
487	Song Ga-in, Jang Ki-yong, Soran, Suho	April 17, 2020
488	Shin Seung-hun, Paul Kim, Choi Ye-geun, Kwon Jin-ah	April 24, 2020
489	Ben, Hong Jin-young, Stella Jang, Tiger JK, Bizzy, BIBI	May 1, 2020
490	Yang Hee-eun, Jung Eun-ji (Apink), Ha Hyun-woo, Kang A Sol, Kim Jin-ho, No Ki-hwa	May 8, 2020
491	Gaeko, Kim Sun Jae, Kim Shin-young, CHEEZE, NU'EST	May 15, 2020
492	Kim Ho Joong, Lee Soo-young, Kim Jae-hwan, Hwang In Wook	May 22, 2020
493	Ha Dong-kyun, Lee Se Joon, Hong Kyung-min, Hynn, Choi Jung-won, Young Ju Jeong, Lee Jong-hyuk	May 29, 2020
494	Bolbbalgan4, Son Yeol-eum, HYNN, Cheetah	June 5, 2020
495	Super Junior-K.R.Y., Kwon Soon-kwan (No Reply), N.Flying, Na Yoon-kwon	June 12, 2020
496	Lee Sun-hee, Jung Seung-hwan, Baek A-yeon, Mi-yu	June 19, 2020
497	Song Chang-sik, Song Ga-in, Kang Seung-yoon, Kwon Soon-kwan (No Reply), Park Hyeon-seo, Jay Park, Sik-K, pH-1, Haon	June 26, 2020
498	Jaurim, Shin Yong-jae, Forestella, Zico	July 3, 2020
499	Colde, DAVII, Jukjae, Zion.T, Hoody, Woodz,	July 10, 2020
500	You Hee-yeol, Lee Moon-sae, Lee So-ra, Yoon Do-hyun	July 17, 2020
501	Jung Eun-ji (Apink), Song So-hee, Okdal, Lee Hi, Exo-SC	July 24, 2020
502	Lee Seok-hoon, Jeon So-mi, DAVII, Jo Kwon, MJ, Ren	July 31, 2020
503	Sandeul, Kang Daniel, 415 (사이로)	August 7, 2020
504	LYn, Hwang So-yoon (Se So Neon), Teen Top, Lee Ye-joon, Monday Kiz	August 14, 2020
505	Paloalto, Huckleberry P, Reddy, Soovi, jerd, Jay Park, KIRIN, Woo Won-jae, Tiger JK, DinDin, Jessi	August 21, 2020
506	Jay Park, Jo Jung-min, Seul, ChoNam Zone, Kim Yoon-hee, Kim Yo-han	August 28, 2020
507	Baek Ji-young, Jung Sung-ho, Lyn, Jo Hang-jo, Jang Beom-june, Gaho, Ha Hyun-woo, Joy, Shin Hyo-beom, Johan Kim	September 4, 2020
508	Choiza, SuperM, Boohwal, Ha-eun	September 11, 2020
509	IU, Jukjae	September 18, 2020
510	10cm, Ha Dong-kyun, Yoon Suk-Chul, Lee Jin-ah, LUNARSOLAR	September 25, 2020
511	Sim Soo-bong, Han Young-ae, Jung Hoon-hee, Lee Moon-se, Jeon In-kwon, Kim Chang-wan, Ha Dong-kyun, Lee Sun-hee, Lee Seung-gi, Yang Hee-eun, Jung-in, Car, the Garden, Choi Baek-ho, IU, Park Joo-won, Bom Yeoreum Gaeul Kyeoul	October 2, 2020
512	Lee Nal-chi, Lee Ja-ram, AkDanGwangChil, Second Moon, Kim Jun-su, Sang Ja-roo, Blackpink	October 9, 2020
513	Kim Chang-wan, Ha-rim, Go Ah-sung, Esom, Park Hye-su, Kwon In-ha	October 16, 2020
514	Im Chang-jung, Lee Soo-hyon, Son Seung-yeon, Kim Yong-jin, Yezi	October 23, 2020
515	CL, Son Seung-yeon, B1A4, Han Dong-hoon Band	October 30, 2020
516	Jannabi, Mamamoo, Noel, DKB	November 6, 2020
517	Lee Juck, Kim Jin-pyo, Mino, Noel, Ha Hyun-sang	November 13, 2020
518	AKMU, Jukjae, AkDanGwangChil, April 2nd	November 20, 2020
519	Gummy, Kim Hyun-chul, Joo Hyun-mi, Teen Top, Everglow	November 27, 2020
520	Yoon Jong-shin, Day6 (Even of Day), Ben, Lee Seung-hoon	December 4, 2020
521	Lee Seung-gi, Henry, Hyo-jung, Jamie	December 11, 2020
522	Paul Kim, AKMU, Han Ji-min, Son Yeol-eum, Yang Hee-eun, Lee Juck, Taeyeon	December 25, 2020

=== 2021 ===
List of guests 2021

No.	Guests	Original air date
523	Lydia Lee, ciipher, sogumm, NIve	January 8, 2021
524	Song Ga-in, Sunwoo Jung-a, Jungyup, (G)I-dle	January 15, 2021
525	Epik High, Jeong Se-woon, Hwang Chi-yeul, Yang Da-il	January 22, 2021
526	Hyuna, Jung Dong-ha, Hwang Chi-yeul, Cho Kyu-hyun	January 29, 2021
527	Bobby Kim, Cheetah, Wan Yihwa, Treasure	February 5, 2021
528	Lee Nal-chi, ChoNam Zone, Norazo, Sechs Kies	February 12, 2021
529	Chungha, Jo Hyun-ah, Se So Neon, Kwon Jin-ah	February 19, 2021
530	Yiruma, Jo Hyun-ah, G.Soul, Lee Seung-hyub (N.Flying)	February 26, 2021
531	Jung-in, E:Rn, WEi, Han Ye-ri	March 5, 2021
532	Sunmi, Lil Boi, Jung-in, AboutU	March 12, 2021
533	Brave Girls, Jessi, YB, Super Junior, Rosé	March 19, 2021
534	Yoon Do-hyun, Soyeon, Lee Seung-chul, Lee Chan-hyuk (AKMU), Jung Mir-ah	March 26, 2021
535	Kim Se-jeong, NeighBro., Hwang Chi-yeul, IU	April 2, 2021
536	Jungyup, Kang Seung-yoon, Stella Jang, Kim Jae-hwan, OnlyOneOf, Baekhyun	April 9, 2021
537	Wheein, Stella Jang, Park Ye-seul, Shin Mi-rae, Sul Ha-yoon, Kim Yong-bin, Choi Hyang, Hoppipolla	April 16, 2021
538	Daybreak, Peppertones, 10cm, Lee Su-hyun, Choi Jung-hoon	April 23, 2021
539	Park Ki-young, Jo Young-soo, Kassy, Peppertones, Jo Jung-chi, Minseo	April 30, 2021
540	Highlight, Jeong Se-woon, Soran, Shin Ye-young	May 7, 2021
541	KCM, Jeong Se-woon, O.WHEN, Lee Young-ji	May 14, 2021
542	Heize, Lim Jeong-hee, Soyou, Na Sang-hyun Band	May 21, 2021
543	Sung Si-kyung, Soyou, Jung Seung-hwan	May 28, 2021
544	Lee Sang-soon, Kassy, Joy, Mamamoo	June 4, 2021
545	Jack and Dmitri, Davicher, Second Aunt KimDaVi, UV, Kwon In-ha, Mad Monster, Sparkling	June 11, 2021
546	Yang Hee-eun, Ivy, Lee Hee-moon's OBSG, Tomorrow X Together	June 18, 2021
547	Big Mama, Sam Kim, Kim Feel, Jin Min-ho, Exo	June 25, 2021
548	Ra Mi-ran, Mirani, Lee Seung-yoon, Yezi	July 2, 2021
549	Ock Joo-hyun, Letteamor, Yang Yo-seob, Even of Day, AQUINAS	July 9, 2021
550	Rocoberry, Loco, Lee Sung-kyung, Parc Jae-jung, Yang Yo-seob, Shin Yu	July 16, 2021
551	Lee Hyun, Lee Mu-jin, DinDin, Jeon So-yeon	July 23, 2021
552	AKMU, Zion.T, SOLE, Wonstein, Jannabi, Heize, D.O.	July 30, 2021
553	Tiger JK, Jannabi, Shin Yong-jae, Kim Je-hyung	August 13, 2021
554	Lee Young-hoon, Oh My Girl, Jeon So-mi, Lucy, Oh Jin-hyek, Kim Woo-jin, Kang Chae-young, Jang Min-hee, An San	August 20, 2021
555	Hyolyn, Kim Da-som, 2F, Ahn Ye-eun, Kyung Seo	August 27, 2021
556	Chae Yeon, Lee Ki-chan, Big Mama King, Wax, Tei, Go Yoo-jin	September 3, 2021
557	Lee Hi, Lee Hong-gi, Baek A-yeon, STAYC	September 10, 2021
558	Nell, Moon Se-yoon, Ravi, F.T. Island, Ateez, Lisa	September 17, 2021
559	Yang Yo-seob, MeloMance, Lim Kim, Jeon Ji-yoon	September 24, 2021
560	Kim Feel, Solar, Norazo, Jung Dong-ha	October 1, 2021
561	The One, Jo Hye-sun, Solar, Rooftop Moonlight, Park Moon-chi, Key	October 8, 2021
562	Kim Hyun-jung, Yoo-mi, Freestyle, Choi Jin-yi, Tim, Se7en	October 15, 2021
563	CNBLUE, Davichi, CL, Stella Jang	October 22, 2021
564	John Park, Kim Dae-myung, Jong-ho, Ben	October 29, 2021
565	Im Chang-jung, HolyBang, N.Flying, Park Hye-won, Kassy	November 5, 2021
566	Park Sun-joo, Ailee, Lee Young-hyun, Laboum	November 12, 2021
567	Epik High, Younha, Lee Young-hyun, DK	November 19, 2021
568	Jaurim, Jang Hye-jin, Kwon In-ha, DinDin	November 26, 2021
569	Jang Pil-soon, Ali, Sam Kim, 2F, Ryu Jeong-han	December 3, 2021
570	F.T. Island, John Park, Jeon Mi-do, Sam Kim, Jung-in	December 10, 2021
571	Position, Big Mama, Hong Kyung-min, Gummy, Jang Hye-jin, Yoon Min-soo, Kim Bum-soo, John Park, Jukjae, Choi Jung-hoon, Kim Jae-hwan, Diva, YB	December 24, 2021
Special	IU, AKMU, MeloMance, Lee Jin-ah, John Park, Jukjae, Choi Jung-hoon, Kim Jae-hwan, So Chan-whee, Kim Kyung-ho, Park Wan-kyu, Jessi, Hyolyn, Lyn, K.Will, Choi Baek-ho, Car, the Garden, Lee Seung-chul, Park Bo-gum, Lee Moon-sae, Lee So-ra, Yoon Do-hyun	December 31, 2021

=== 2022 ===
List of guests 2022

No.	Guests	Original air date
572	Lee Min-hyuk, Youra, Hardy, MeloMance, Nerd Connection, Janet Suhh, Kang Baek-soo, Itzy	January 7, 2022
573	Lyn, Cho Kwang-il, Be'O, Jang Hye-jin, Lee So-jung	January 14, 2022
574	Kim Yong-jun, Kim Yo-han, Jang Hye-jin, LEENU	January 21, 2022
575	Cho Kyu-hyun, Lee Jin-ah, Lee Chan-won, Lee Ye-joon	January 28, 2022
576	Wheein, Ahn Ye-eun, Lee Chan-won, Kang Seung-won	February 4, 2022
577	Lena Park, Big Mama, Jeon So-yeon, Navi	February 11, 2022
578	Vibe, Sohyang, Jeon So-yeon, Cha Ji-yeon, Apink, Taeyeon	February 18, 2022
579	Lee Mu-jin, Lee Yoo-mi, Yoon Chan-young, BTOB, Sonic Stones, Treasure	February 25, 2022
580	Hyolyn, STAYC, Hwang In-wook, Lee Mu-jin	March 4, 2022
581	Chang Kiha, Lee Seung-yoon, Forestella, Nerd Connection	March 11, 2022
582	MSG Wannabe M.O.M, Solji, Hong Eui-jin, Forestella	March 18, 2022
583	Lee Seok-hoon, Kyuhyun, Highlight, THAMA	March 25, 2022
584	Noel, Wheein, Oh My Girl, Onewe	April 1, 2022
585	Daybreak, Lucy, Kwon Jin-ah, Wheein, Rad Museum	April 8, 2022
586	Jessi, Sunwoojunga, Say Sue Me, Ha Hyun-woo	April 15, 2022
587	Hwasa, Choi Jung-hoon, Lee Mu-jin, MeloMance, Davichi, Jukjae, Kim Feel, Dindin, Yang Hee-eun, Big Bang	April 22, 2022
588	Soyou, Song Ga-in, Bookku Ddong, Choi Yoo-jung, Cheeze	April 29, 2022
589	Ryeowook, MeloMance, Im Ji-hoon, Im Hyun-sik, 4Men	May 6, 2022
590	PSY, Jung Seung-hwan, Choi Jung-hoon	May 13, 2022
591	Bom Yeoreum Gaeul Kyeoul(Kim Jong-jin), Jeong Se-woon, G.Soul, Jeong Dong-won	May 20, 2022
592	Kim Moon-jeong, Ock Joo-hyun, Kang Seung-won, Suzy, Hwang Chi-yeul, G-Soul	May 27, 2022
593	BOL4, Forestella, Kassy, Son Dong-woon	June 3, 2022
594	Park Ji-yoon, Shin Yong-jae, Giriboy, Seunghee, Son Dong-woon	June 10, 2022
595	Jay Park, Big Naughty, Lee Ji-young, Baek A-yeon, Vincent Blue	June 17, 2022
596	Paul Kim, Oh Yeon-seo, Seo In-guk, Kwon Soo-hyun, Baek A-yeon, Dvwn	June 24, 2022
597	Heize, Lee Mu-jin, Nucksal, Cadejo, Kard	July 1, 2022
598	Kim Jong-kook, KCM, Sunmi, Rothy, Bada	July 8, 2022
599	10cm, Yoon Jong-shin, Billlie, Bada, Itzy	July 15, 2022
600	Paul Kim, MeloMance, 10 cm, Heize, Daybreak, Hyojung, Seunghee, Kim Jong-kook, Sistar, Gummy	July 22, 2022

== Ratings ==
=== 2016 ===
List of ratings (2016)

Episode #	Broadcast Date	AGB Ratings
304	January 22, 2016	1.5%
305	January 29, 2016	1.7%
306	February 12, 2016	1.6%
307	February 19, 2016	1.7%
308	February 26, 2016	1.6%
309	March 4, 2016	2.2%
310	March 11, 2016	1.8%
311	March 18, 2016	2.4%
312	March 25, 2016	1.8%
313	April 1, 2016	2.0%
314	April 8, 2016	1.4%
315	April 15, 2016	2.7%
316	April 22, 2016	1.9%
317	April 29, 2016	1.7%
318	May 6, 2016	1.9%
319	May 13, 2016	2.5%
320	May 20, 2016	1.9%
321	May 27, 2016	2.1%
322	June 3, 2016	2.5%
323	June 10, 2016	3.1%
324	June 17, 2016	2.4%
325	June 24, 2016	2.2%
326	July 1, 2016	2.8%
327	July 8, 2016	2.0%
328	July 15, 2016	2.8%
329	July 22, 2016	2.4%
330	July 29, 2016	2.0%
331	August 5, 2016	2.5%
332	August 26, 2016	2.2%
333	September 2, 2016	1.8%
334	September 9, 2016	1.7%
335	September 23, 2016	1.4%
336	September 30, 2016	1.4%
337	October 7, 2016	1.4%
338	October 22, 2016	2.1%
339	October 29, 2016	1.9%
340	November 5, 2016	1.3%
341	November 12, 2016	1.9%
342	November 19, 2016	2.4%
343	November 26, 2016	2.3%
344	December 3, 2016	1.3%
345	December 10, 2016	2.0%
346	December 17, 2016	2.8%

=== 2017 ===
List of ratings (2017)

Episode #	Broadcast Date	AGB Ratings
347	January 7, 2017	2.5%
348	January 14, 2017	2.5%
349	January 21, 2017	2.1%
350	February 4, 2017	2.2%
351	February 11, 2017	1.7%
352	February 18, 2017	1.4%
353	February 25, 2017	2.5%
354	March 4, 2017	2.1%
355	March 11, 2017	2.3%
356	March 18, 2017	2.2%
357	March 25, 2017	1.6%
358	April 1, 2017	1.9%
359	April 8, 2017	2.2%
360	April 15, 2017	2.3%
361	April 22, 2017	1.9%
362	April 29, 2017	2.5%
363	May 6, 2017	1.7%
364	May 13, 2017	2.1%
365	May 20, 2017	2.1%
366	May 27, 2017	3.1%
367	June 3, 2017	1.5%
368	June 10, 2017	1.4%
369	June 17, 2017	1.7%
370	June 24, 2017	1.7%
371	July 1, 2017	1.7%
372	July 8, 2017	2.3%
373	July 15, 2017	2.5%
374	July 22, 2017	1.9%
375	July 29, 2017	2.4%
376	August 5, 2017	1.6%
377	August 12, 2017	2.0%
378	August 19, 2017	2.0%
379	August 26, 2017	1.7%
380	September 2, 2017	1.6%
381	September 9, 2017	1.6%
382	September 16, 2017	1.2%

=== 2018 ===
List of ratings (2018)

Episode #	Broadcast Date	AGB Ratings
383	January 13, 2018	1.4%
384	January 20, 2018	1.8%
385	January 27, 2018	1.9%
386	February 3, 2018	0.9%
387	February 24, 2018	1.9%
388	March 3, 2018	1.5%
389	March 10, 2018	1.6%
390	March 17, 2018	1.5%
391	March 31, 2018	1.2%
392	April 7, 2018	1.3%
393	April 14, 2018	1.8%
394	April 21, 2018	1.7%
395	April 28, 2018	1.1%
396	May 5, 2018	1.3%
397	May 12, 2018	2.4%
398	May 19, 2018	1.7%
399	May 26, 2018	1.3%
400	June 2, 2018	1.8%
401	June 9, 2018	1.6%
402	July 21, 2018	2.1%
403	July 28, 2018	1.6%
404	August 4, 2018	1.4%
405	August 11, 2018	1.6%
406	August 18, 2018	1.3%
407	August 25, 2018	1.8%
408	September 1, 2018	1.7%
409	September 7, 2018	1.6%
410	September 14, 2018	1.2%
411	September 21, 2018	1.8%
412	September 28, 2018	1.2%
413	October 5, 2018	1.6%
414	October 12, 2018	1.4%
415	October 19, 2018	1.0%
416	October 26, 2018	1.3%
417	November 2, 2018	1.6%
418	November 9, 2018	1.3%
419	November 16, 2018	1.1%
420	November 23, 2018	1.4%
421	November 30, 2018	1.4%
422	December 7, 2018	1.2%
423	December 14, 2018	1.3%
424	December 21, 2018	2.1%

=== 2019 ===
List of ratings (2019)

Episode #	Broadcast Date	AGB Ratings
425	January 4, 2019	1.3%
426	January 11, 2019	0.9%
427	January 18, 2019	1.3%
428	January 25, 2019	1.3%
429	February 8, 2019	1.4%
430	February 15, 2019	1.1%
431	February 22, 2019	1.4%
432	March 1, 2019	1.3%
433	March 8, 2019	1.1%
434	March 15, 2019	2.0%
435	March 22, 2019	1.5%
436	March 29, 2019	1.7%
437	April 5, 2019	1.2%
438	April 12, 2019	1.4%
439	April 19, 2019	1.6%
440	April 26, 2019	1.0%
441	May 3, 2019	0.9%
442	May 10, 2019	1.1%
443	May 17, 2019	1.5%
444	May 24, 2019	1.5%
445	May 31, 2019	1.3%
446	June 7, 2019	1.5%
447	June 14, 2019	1.8%
448	June 21, 2019	1.1%
449	June 28, 2019	1.5%
450	July 5, 2019	1.1%
451	July 12, 2019	1.2%
452	July 19, 2019	1.2%
453	July 26, 2019	1.0%
454	August 9, 2019	1.9%
455	August 16, 2019	1.3%
456	August 23, 2019	1.3%
457	August 30, 2019	1.5%
458	September 6, 2019	1.2%
459	September 13, 2019	1.0%
460	September 21, 2019	1.6%
461	September 28, 2019	1.7%
462	October 4, 2019	1.6%
463	October 18, 2019	1.5%
464	October 25, 2019	1.4%
465	November 1, 2019	1.0%
466	November 8, 2019	0.7%
467	November 15, 2019	1.5%
468	November 22, 2019	1.2%
469	November 29, 2019	1.2%
470	December 6, 2019	1.1%
471	December 13, 2019	1.0%
472	December 20, 2019	1.6%

=== 2020 ===
List of ratings (2020)

Episode #	Broadcast Date	AGB Ratings
473	January 3, 2020	0.8%
474	January 10, 2020	0.8%
475	January 17, 2020	1.3%
476	January 24, 2020	0.7%
477	January 31, 2020	1.8%
478	February 14, 2020	1.0%
479	February 21, 2020	1.8%
480	February 28, 2020	1.0%
481	March 6, 2020	1.0%
482	March 13, 2020	1.0%
483	March 20, 2020	1.1%
484	March 27, 2020	0.7%
485	April 3, 2020	1.0%
486	April 10, 2020	1.2%
487	April 17, 2020	1.3%
488	April 24, 2020	1,0%
489	May 1, 2020	1.4%
490	May 8, 2020	0.9%
491	May 15, 2020	0.8%
492	May 22, 2020	1.9%
493	May 29, 2020	1.0%
494	June 5, 2020	1.1%
495	June 12, 2020	0.8%
496	June 19, 2020	1.2%
497	June 26, 2020	1.1%
498	July 3, 2020	1.2%
499	July 10, 2020	0.8%
500	July 17, 2020	1.6%
501	July 24, 2020	0.8%
502	July 31, 2020	0.9%
503	August 7, 2020	0.7%
504	August 14, 2020	0.8%
505	August 21, 2020	0.8%
506	August 28, 2020	0.8%
507	September 4, 2020	1.3%
508	September 11, 2020	0.7%
509	September 18, 2020	2.2%
510	September 25, 2020	0.5%
511	October 2, 2020	0.7%
