= Seenroot =

South Korean musical duo

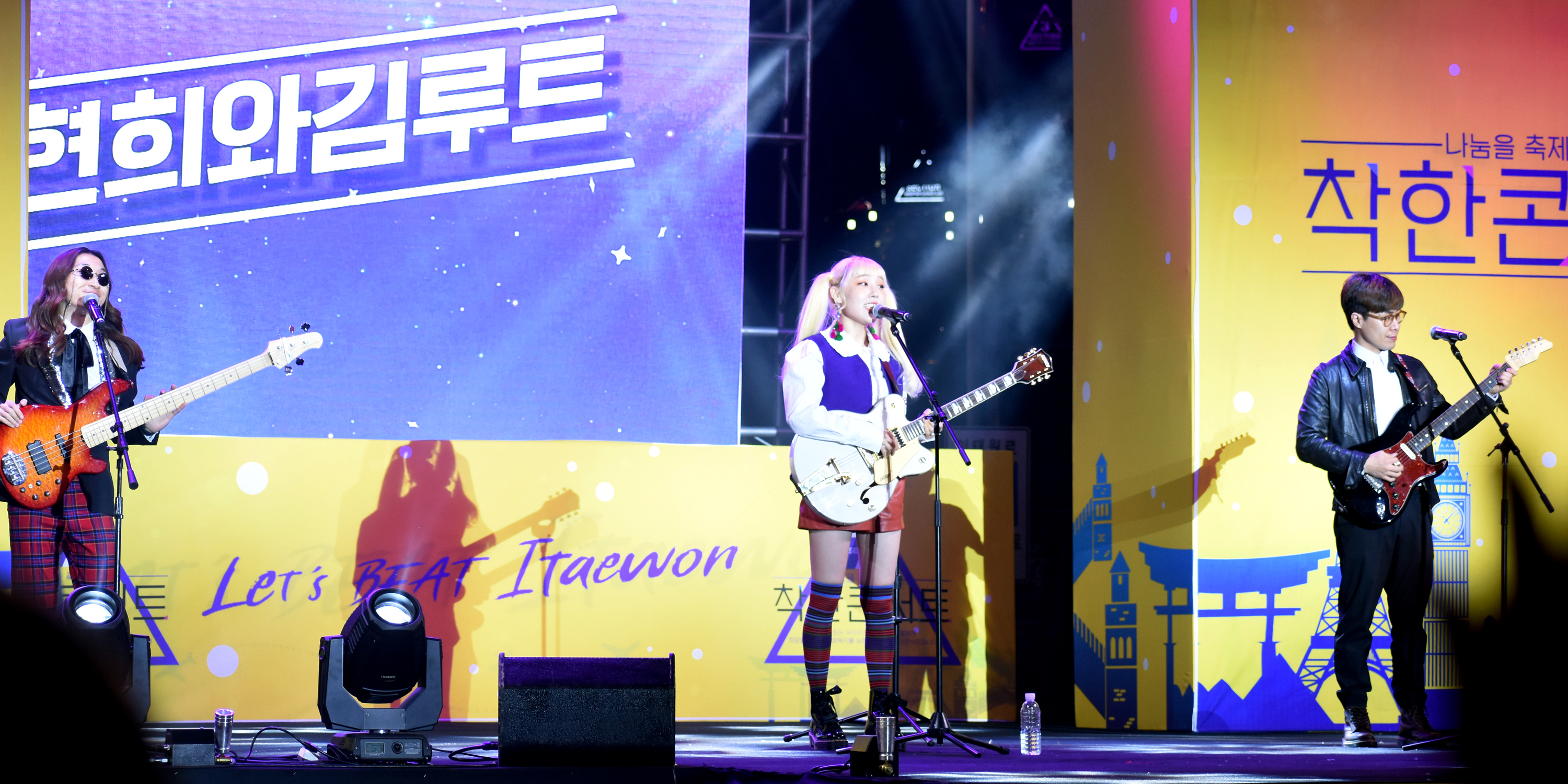
- Seenroot at the Itaewon Global Village Festival, October 2018

Background information
- Origin: Seoul, South Korea
- Genres: Contemporary folk
- Years active: 2013–2019
- Labels: D Ocean Music; Mun Hwa In
- Past members: Shin Hyun-hee; Kim Root
- Website: munhwain.kr

Korean name
- Hangul: 신현희와김루트
- RR: Sin Hyeonhuiwa Gim Ruteu
- MR: Sin Hyŏnhŭiwa Kim Rut'ŭ

Seenroot (Korean: 신현희와김루트; lit. 'Shin Hyun-hee and Kim Root') was a South Korean musical duo, signed under Kakao M's indie sub-label Mun Hwa In. The pair's debut mini-album was released in 2015. The record's lead single "Sweet Heart" did not see success until two years after its release, when a broadcast jockey sang the song in midst of live streaming and became a viral video. It led the song to peak at number 13 on the national Gaon Digital Chart, where it sold nearly 1.3 million downloads by the end of 2017.

== History ==
Originally majoring in fashion design, Shin Hyun-hee learned to play acoustic guitar after watching tutorials on the online video website YouTube. She posted videos on the platform, which led her to perform in Daegu where she met Kim Root. A jazz major, Kim wanted to form a jazz ensemble at the time. He felt that Shin's voice was "incredibly good", and decided to form a band with her.

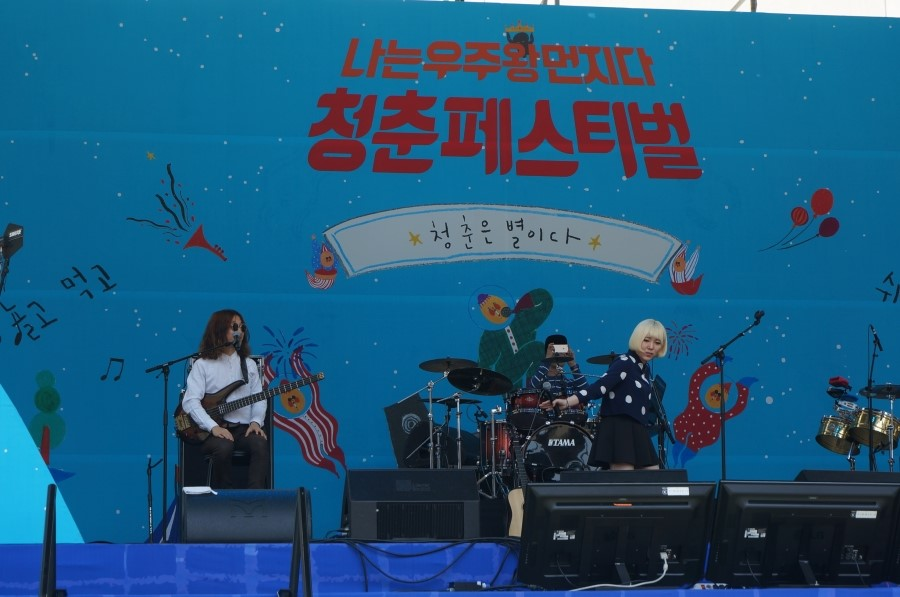
Seenroot at the 2015 Bluespring Festival

Seenroot's first release "Comfortable Song" was included on the compilation album Between the Cafes Vol.2 (2013), which featured songs from new acoustic indie music acts. The duo released its debut single "Cap Song" on April 4, 2014. The pair participated in over 200 performances and festivals for the following ten months. Seenroot released its debut self-titled mini-album on February 26, 2015. Writing for newspaper No Cut News, Kim Hyeon-shik described the lead single "Sweet Heart" as "cheerful and fresh", noting its "peculiar attraction". The band released its first studio album Seenroot's Wonderland on June 15, 2016.

In January 2017, AfreecaTV broadcast jockey Kkotnim sang "Sweet Heart" while live streaming. The clip was shared across social media and became a viral video, which fueled the track to climb South Korean online music stores two years after its initial release. The song entered the country's national singles chart at number 34 and peaked at number 13. The duo's mini-album The Color of Seenroot was released on July 11, 2018.

Seenroot disbanded in 2019 following the expiration of their contracts.

== Members ==
Adapted from D Ocean Music.

- Shin Hyun-hee – vocals, guitar
- Kim Root – bass, chorus

== Discography ==
=== Studio albums ===
Title	Album details	Peak chart positions	Sales
Title	Album details	Gaon Album Chart	Sales
Seenroot's Wonderland (신루트의 이상한 나라; Sinruteuui Isanghan Nara)	Released: June 15, 2016; Label: Mun Hwa In, Kakao M; Format: CD, digital download	58	

==== Extended plays ====
Title	Album details	Peak chart positions	Sales
Title	Album details	Gaon Album Chart	Sales
Seenroot (신현희와김루트; Sin Hyeonhuiwa Gim Ruteu)	Released: February 26, 2015; Label: Mirrorball Music; Format: CD, digital download	—	
The Color of Seenroot	Released: July 11, 2018; Label: Mun Hwa In, Kakao M; Format: CD, digital download	54	

=== Singles ===
==== As lead artist ====
Title	Year	Peak chart positions	Sales (DL)	Album
Title	Year	Gaon Digital Chart	Sales (DL)	Album
"Cap Song" (캡송; Kaep Song)	2014	—		Found Tracks Vol.45
"Sweet Heart" (오빠야; Oppaya)	2015	13	KOR: 1,291,310	Seenroot
"Wings of Desire (Acoustic)" (날개 (Acoustic); Nalgae (Acoustic))	2015	—		Non-album release
"Trust Me, Mom!" (왜 때려요 엄마; Wae Ttaeryeoyo Eomma)	2015	—		Seenroot's Wonderland
"Secret Crush" (짝사랑은 힘들어; Jjaksarangeun Himdeureo)	2015	—		Seenroot's Wonderland
"Shouldn't Have Done That" (그러지 말걸; Geureoji Malgeol)	2016	—		Seenroot's Wonderland
"It's Meant to Be" (인연이란게 원래 그냥 그래; Inyeonirange Wollae Geunyang Geurae)	2016	—		Seenroot's Wonderland
"He and Me" (그 와 나; Geu Wa Na)	2016	—		Seenroot's Wonderland
"YOLO" (참지마요; Chamjimayo) (with Long:D)	2016	—		Non-album release
"Diehard" (다이하드; Daihadeu)	2016	—		Non-album release
"Everyone's Breath" (숨소리; Sumsori) (with Bye Bye Sea, Romantic Punch, Biuret, Super Kidd, April 2, Cold Cherry, Hash, Haze Moon Band, and T.A-Copy)	2017	—		Non-album release
"Together" (같이 같이; Gachi Gachi)	2017	—		Non-album release
"Between Friends and Lovers" (친구와 연인; Chinguwa Yeonin) (with 015B)	2017	—		Anthology
"Paradise"	2018	—		The Color of Seenroot

=== Guest appearances ===
List of non-single guest appearances, showing year released and album name
Title	Year	Album
"Comfortable Song" (편한 노래; Pyeonhan Norae)	2013	Between the Cafes Vol.2
"Mapo Terminal" (마포종점; Mapo Jongjeom)	2017	Immortal Songs: Singing the Legend
"Cheer Up!" (할 수 있어!; Hal Su Isseo!)	2017	Fever Music 2017

=== Soundtrack appearances ===
List of soundtrack songs, showing year released and soundtrack name
Title	Year	Soundtrack
"No Worry"	2016	My Fair Lady OST
"Roller Coaster" (롤러코스터; Rolleo Koseuteo)	2017	Good Manager OST
"Why You?" (너는 왜; Neoneun Wae)	2017	Suspicious Partner OST
"Soon Enough" (언젠가; Eonjenga)	2017	Non-album release
"Kyung-ah's Day" (경아의 하루; Gyeongaui Haru)	2018	Two Yoo Project Sugar Man 2
