= Big Brain =

South Korean boy band

Big Brain 빅브레인
- Origin: Seoul, South Korea
- Genres: R&B, K-pop, soul, urban
- Years active: 2015–present
- Labels: Official website
- Members: Mo Sang Hoon; Kim Jin Yong; Hwang Byeong Eun; Yoon Hong Hyun
- Website: Official website

Big Brain (Korean: 빅브레인) is a South-Korean R&B ballad group that consist of four-members under the label World Show Market. They have been active since 2010 and officially debuted on October 22, 2015, with the album Billionaire Sound and their breakthrough song "Welcome".

== History ==
=== Pre-debut ===
They were group of students who majored in vocal performance and decided to form their own group. During pre-debut, they were known as The Man, but changed their name due to similarity with another senior group. Big Brain is a group that enjoys music, singing and hopes that their music will heal others. Before their official debut, many people already recognised their outstanding talent, calling them the next Brown Eyed Soul and compared them to Big Mama Before they held their official debut concert in South Korea, they were busking around New York City and performed in several places including Times Square, Central Park, and other places in Manhattan.

=== 2015 debut, Billionaire Sound ===
The group debuted on October 22, 2015, with the release of their first mini-album Billionaire Sound and their digital single featuring title track "Welcome". "Welcome" is an emotional ballad mixed with powerful R&B and a fresh tempo. The story of the song is about an honest man who wishes that his ex-lover would never have a beautiful relationship with another man. They showed an impressive work which boldly challenged the youth with different genres.

=== 2016 ===
They became an opening act in Olivia Newton-John concert on May, 14

== Members ==
- Sanghoon (Korean: 상훈)
- Jinyong (진용)
- Byeongeun (병은)
- Honghyun (홍현)

== Discography ==
=== Digital Singles ===
Year	Information	Track listing
2015	"Billionaire Sound": Released: October 22, 2015; Language: Korean; Label: World Show Market, kt music	1. "Welcome (환영)"; 2. "Welcome (환영) (Instrumental)"
2015	"Brain's 1st Respect": Released: December 28, 2015; Language: Korean; Label: World Show Market, kt music	1. "Break away (브레이크 어웨이)"; 2. "Break away (브레이크 어웨이) (Instrumental)
2016	"The Voicist": Released: February 22, 2016; Language: Korean; Label: World Show Market, kt music	1. "No YEs (“노예들”? /“아니-괜찮아!”?)"; 2. "No YEs (“노예들”? /“아니-괜찮아!”?)" ( Instrumental); 3. "No YEs (“노예들”? /“아니-괜찮아!”?)" (Concerto)
2016	"meet you..": Released: May 23, 2016; Language: Korean; Label: World Show Market, 1TheK	1. "Love,Love. (테이의 꿈꾸는 라디오)"; 2. "Love,Love. (테이의 꿈꾸는 라디오)"( Instrumental)
2016	"The Moment": Released: October 17, 2016; Language: Korean; Label: World Show Market, 1TheK	1. "Sick (아파)"; 2. "Sick (아파)"( Instrumental)

== Television ==
Year	Title	Notes
November 4, 2015	Pops in Seoul	Episode 3024
March 18, 2016	You Hee-yeol's Sketchbook	Episode 309
March 26, 2016	Immortal Songs 2	Songwriter Park Chunseok Special
May 27, 2016	You Hee-Yeol's Sketchbook	Episode 321
May 29, 2016	King of Masked Singer	Yoon Hong-hyun
September 16, 2016	Duet Song Festival	Kim Jin-yong
September 17, 2016	Immortal Songs 2	Drama Soundtrack Special
