= Dia (singer) =

- 김지은
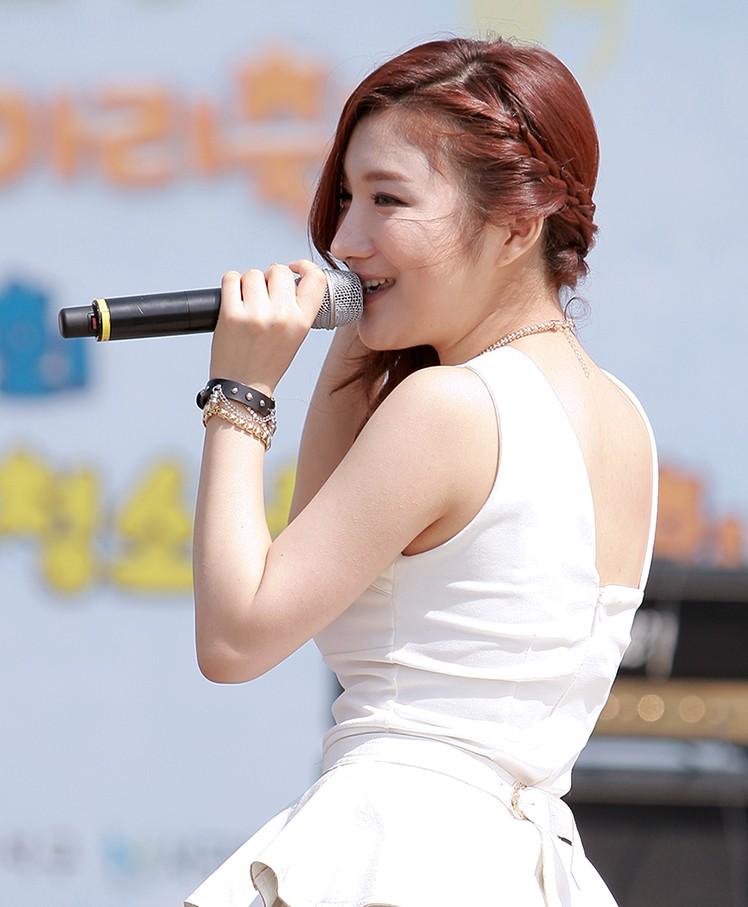
- Dia in 2013, during a performance with girl group Bella
- Born: Kim Ji-eun; June 12, 1992 (age 34); Incheon, South Korea
- Occupation: Singer
- Musical career
- Genres: K-pop; dance; pop; R&B
- Years active: 2009–present
- Labels: Jiseong P&C; Polaris; Winning InSight Music
- Formerly of: Kiss & Cry

Korean name
- Hangul: 김지은
- Hanja: 金篪殷
- RR: Gim Jieun
- MR: Kim Chiŭn

Dia (Korean: 디아; born Kim Ji-eun on June 12, 1992), stylized as DIA, is a South Korean singer and a member of the disbanded girl group Kiss&Cry.

== Career ==
Dia created a sketchbook called Dia's Sketchbook, in which she places videos of her singing covers of other people's songs. Dia has collaborated with many artist including IU, The Black, D'Nine, H-Eugene, PD Blue, and such.

She was a member of girl group Kiss & Cry, which released two singles (Domino Game & Bad Girl) and then disbanded (although their company claims they are simply on hiatus, there is notably no mention of the group anywhere on the company's website).

Dia is a lyricist and songwriter for other artist's songs such as Twice's Three Times a Day.

== Discography ==
=== Studio albums ===
Title	Album details	Peak chart positions	Sales
Title	Album details	KOR	Sales
My Story (1Carat)	Released: November 17, 2010; Label: Ogan Entertainment; Formats: CD, digital download; Track listing: 1. 하루종일 비가 내렸어; 2. 온세상에 눈이 내리면 (feat Soul Connection, Dr.9); 3. 사랑이 오려나 봐요 (feat A-mi); 4. 니가 돌아오면; 5. 울어도 울어도; 6. Slowly Feel My Eyes; 7. 바보처럼 좋아해; 8. 나방; 9. Another Boy; 10. 이젠 안녕; 11. 사랑에 미쳐서; 12. Knock (feat H-Eugene); 13. D.bridge (feat The Black); 14. 하루종일 비가 내렸어 (Inst.)	—	—N/a
Stardust	Released: June 14, 2017; Label: TL Entertainment; Formats: CD, digital download; Track listing: 1. 잠 못 드는 밤에; 2. 귀여워; 3. 비행 소녀; 4. U.F.O; 5. 안녕; 6. Come On Down; 7. 말 많은 아저씨; 8. 뚝뚝; 9. 집에 가기 아쉬워; 10. Paradise	—	—N/a
"—" denotes releases that did not chart.

=== Extended plays ===
Title	Album details	Peak chart positions	Sales
Title	Album details	KOR	Sales
0 Carat	Released: February 10, 2009; Label: Genie Music; Formats: CD, digital download; Track listing: 1. My Dream; 2. 웃어봐; 3. With U (feat. Dr9); 4. 사랑은 독이다; 5. Karma; 6. My Dream (Piano Ver); 7. My Dream (Eng Ver); 8. My Dream (Inst.); 9. 웃어봐 (Remix); 10. My Dream (Remix); 11. Karma (Remix)	—	—N/a
Luxury Edition	Released: January 5, 2011; Label: Ogan Entertainment; Formats: CD, digital download; Track listing: 1. 하루종일 비가 내렸어 (Jung String Ver); 2. 온세상에 눈이 내리면 (EmeNes Remix) (feat Dr.9, Crispi Crunch); 3. Slowly Feel My Eyes (JK Remix) (feat Crispi Crunch); 4. 하루종일 비가 내렸어(Jung String Ver) (Inst)	—	—N/a
"—" denotes releases that did not chart.

=== Singles (As lead artist/Collaborations/As featured artist) ===
Title	Year	Peak chart positions	Album
Title	Year	KOR	Album
As lead artist
"Another Boy"	2010	75	0.5 Carat single album
"Bye For Now" (이젠 안녕)	2010	—	My Story (1Carat)
"Cry Cry" (울어도 울어도)	2010	—	My Story (1Carat)
"Alone" (혼자서)	2011	—	Non-album singles
"Love Step" (러브스텝)	2011	—	Non-album singles
"Speed Dial No. 1" (단축번호 1번)	2012	—	Non-album singles
"Like You Like a Fool" (바보처럼 좋아해)	2012	—	Non-album singles
"Crazy for Love" (사랑에 미쳐서)	2012	—	Non-album singles
"La Ta Ta" (라따따)	2012	—	Non-album singles
"Breaking Up" (사귈만큼 사귀었어)	2013	63	Non-album singles
"Paradise"	2014	—	Non-album singles
"A-ya" (아야)	2015	—	Non-album singles
Collaborations
"Regret" (이별후회) with PD Blue	2011	—	Non-album singles
"My Soo" (사랑한단말이야) with PD Blue	2011	—	Non-album singles
You & I, I & You" (너에게 난 나에게 넌) with PD Blue	2011	—	Non-album singles
"Be Modern" (모던하게) with Kiss & Cry, feat Shorry of Mighty Mouth	2013	—	Non-album singles
"Domino Game" (도미노 게임) with Kiss & Cry	2014	—	Non-album singles
"Revenge" (나쁜 여자) with Kiss & Cry	2014	60	Non-album singles
Soundtrack appearances
"Parting For Me" (날 위한 이별)	2013	10	Reply 1994 OST Part 6
"Game Set" feat. Mathi	2015	—	Make a Woman Cry OST Part 1
"I Don't See My Heart Cry" (울어볼 가슴이 없어)	2015	—	My Mother is a Daughter-in-law OST Part 13
"Like a Star in the Moonlight" (달빛에 별처럼)	2016	—	Sweet Home, Sweet Honey OST Part 6
"—" denotes releases that did not chart.

== Personal life ==
Dia attended Sangok High School. She is currently attending Seoul Institute of the Arts.

== Awards ==
- 2008 : Chupung Ryeon Song Festival Award (in Yeongdong County)
- 2008 : Youth Song Festival Daesang Award
- 2008 : Incheon Bupyeong Award Daesang
- 2008 : Gold Dongseongro Song Festival Award (in Daegu)
- 2008 : Gold Pohang Beach Song Festival Award
- 2008 : The Revenge Song Festival Silver Award (in Ulsan)
