= Shinchireem =

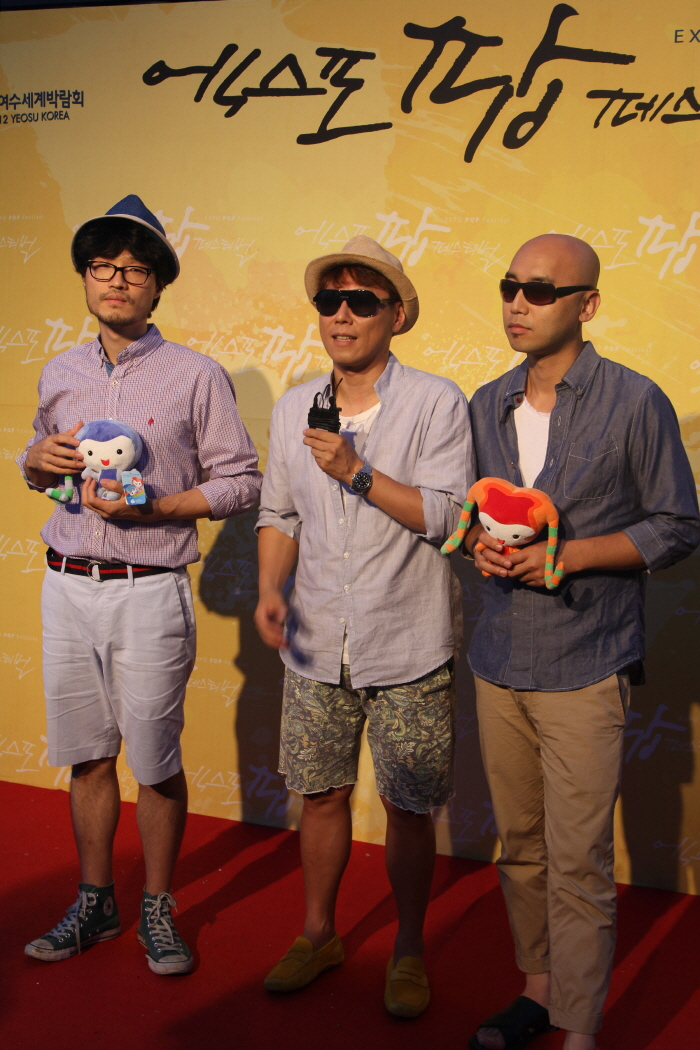

Background information
- Origin: South Korea
- Genres: Indie rock, folk rock
- Years active: 2011–2012
- Labels: Mystic Entertainment
- Members: Yoon Jong-shin; Jo Jung-chi; Hareem
- Website: Shinchireem on Facebook

Shinchireem (Korean: 신치림; Hanja: 信治琳) is a South Korean rock band. Their members consist of Yoon Jong-shin, Jo Jung-chi and Hareem. Shinchireem is currently signed to Mystic Entertainment. Shinchireem released their first single, "Unknown Number" in February 2012.

== Discography ==
=== Studio albums ===
- Episode 01 旅行 (2012)

=== Singles ===
Title	Year	Peak chart positions	Album
Title	Year	KOR	Album
"Your Thought" (니 생각) (with Yoon Jong-shin and Kim Greem)	2011	94	Monthly Project 2011 Yoon Jong Shin
"Unknown Number" (모르는 번호)	2012	—	Episode 01 旅行
"You Can Do It" (넌 할 수 있어) (with Cultwo, featuring K. Jun)	2012	—	Non-album single
