= Sweet Sorrow (band) =

South Korean band

- Origin: South Korea
- Genres: K-pop; R&B; a cappella
- Years active: 2002–present
- Labels: Sweetsorrow Company
- Members: In Ho-jin; Song Woo-jin; Kim Young-woo (singer)
- Past members: Sung Jin-hwan

Sweet Sorrow (Korean: 스윗 소로우) is a South Korean male vocal group formed in 2002. Originally a quartet, its current members consist of In Ho-jin, Song Woo-jin and Kim Young-woo. In 2019, they joined with female vocal group The Barberettes and performed together under the name "SBSB" (스바스바).

== History ==
In Ho-jin, Song Woo-jin, Sung Jin-hwan and pianist Kim Young-woo first met around 1996 as students at Yonsei University and were all members of the university glee club. Together with four other friends, they formed their own eight-member a cappella group and received a positive response. The name "Sweet Sorrow" was taken from the quote "Parting is such sweet sorrow" in Romeo and Juliet and was conceived by Kim, an English literature major, as a reminder of the hardship they had gone through together. Only the four of them chose to pursue music professionally and debuted in 2002.

After a stint performing cover songs at college festivals and events, the quartet came to national prominence by winning the Daesang (Grand Prize) at the 16th Yoo Jae-ha Music Competition for their original song "Sweet Sorrow". They were signed by the company Mezoo Cultures and released their first album in 2005. They also came to prominence with a much larger audience for performing the soundtracks of popular television dramas and their appearances on the MBC singing competition Show Survival (쇼바이벌) and the KBS music program Immortal Songs: Singing the Legend.

In December 2017, Sung announced that he would be a hiatus for health reasons and later left permanently. Sweet Sorrow returned as a trio in 2019 with a new album. They also combined with The Barberettes to form a mixed group called "SBSB" and performed together on Immortal Songs.

== Discography ==
=== Studio albums ===
Title	Album details	Peak chart positions	Sales
Title	Album details	KOR	Sales
Sweet Sorrow	Released: November 15, 2005; Label: Mezoomusic; Formats: CD, cassette	—	—
Sweetics	Released: February 21, 2008; Label: Mezoomusic; Formats: CD	5	KOR: 15,049
Songs	Released: March 12, 2009; Label: Mezoomusic; Formats: CD	—	—
Viva	Released: January 31, 2012; Label: Gem Cultures; Formats: CD, digital download	8	KOR: 6,772
"—" denotes release did not chart.

=== Extended plays ===
Title	Album details	Peak chart positions	Sales
Title	Album details	KOR	Sales
For Lovers Only	Released: June 2, 2014; Label: Music&NEW; Formats: CD, digital download	5	KOR: 2,794
For Losers Only	Released: October 15, 2015; Label: Music&NEW; Formats: CD, digital download	18	KOR: 1,433
5th Part 1: New Day	Released: November 15, 2019; Label: Sweet Sorrow Company, Genie; Formats: CD, digital download	38	—

=== Singles ===
Title	Year	Peak chart positions	Sales	Album
Title	Year	KOR	Sales	Album
"Small Room (ft. IU)"	2020	—	—	Non-album single
"—" denotes releases that did not chart or were not released in that region.

== Awards and nominations ==
Year	Award	Category	Nominated work	Result
2012	MBC Entertainment Awards	Excellence Award in Radio		Won
