= Bye Bye Sea =

South Korean band

byebyesea
- Also known as: Annyeongbada
- Origin: South Korea
- Genres: Rock, K-Pop, Indie
- Years active: 2007–present
- Label: Cosmic Music Lab
- Members: Namu (Tree Kim); Woo Myung-jae; Woo Sun-jae
- Past members: Dae-hyun; Jun-hyuk

byebyesea (Annyeongbada) (안녕바다), meaning 'goodbye sea', is a famous Korean pop band. They debuted in 2009 under Fluxus Music.

== History ==
Band byebyesea, Annyeongbada first formed as an indie band in 2006 as "I Cross the Sea With You" (난그대와바다를가르네), active in the Hongdae area of Seoul. They renamed the group byebyesea (Annyeongbada) in May 2007, and in March 2008 they signed with Fluxus Music. In 2009, before their official debut in December, the group made two cameos on the TV-dramas I Am Legend and Playful Kiss. They have performed at many rock music festivals throughout Korea like Green Plugged Festival, Beautiful Mint Life, and Pentaport Rock Festival.

Star Shower (별빛이 내린다) was a song that really pulled Annyeongbada into the spotlight. Being performed and featured in many TV programs, the song is still used today on variety shows and CFs for its unique melody that gives the feeling of being star struck.

Namu (Tree Kim) has been also working as music director since 2021. One of his film as a music director, "Song of the Same Night" won many awards in numerous world film festivals. And currently working in other films as music director as well.

Song of the Same Night IMDB page

== Members ==
=== Current members ===
- Namu (Tree Kim) (나무) - vocals and guitar
- Myung Je Woo (우명제) - bass
- Sunjae Woo (우선제) - guitar

=== Current Session members ===
- Sangjin Kwon (권상진) - keyboard
- Sungjae, Kim (김성재) - drums

=== Past members ===
- Lee Joon-hyuk (이준혁) - drums
- Dae-hyun (대현) - keyboard

== Discography ==
=== Studio albums ===
Title	Album details	Track listing
City Complex	Released: November 16, 2010; Label: Fluxus Music; Format: CD	Track listing: 1. "Never Stop"; 2. "My Mind Talks (Reprise)"; 3. "Outside the Window is a Peaceful Table" (창 밖은 평화로운 식탁); 4. "You & Me"; 5. "I Remember It Again Today" (오늘도 생각이 나네요); 6. "Proposal" (청혼); 7. "Fight Club"; 8. "Sea of Tears" (눈물바다); 9. "Starlight is Coming Down" (별 빛이 내린다); 10. "Liar"; 11. "Wet My Pillow" (베개를 적시다); 12. "City Complex"
Pink Revolution	Released: February 8, 2012; Label: Fluxus Music; Format: CD	Track listing: 1. "I Will Call You" (전화할게); 2. "Yesterday Night" (어젯밤); 3. "Devil" (악마); 4. "Lumious Star" (야광별); 5. "Monologue"; 6. "Pierrot" (삐에로); 7. "Period" (마침표); 8. "Fool Bus" (바보버스); 9. "I Like You (feat. Kim Hyo Yeon)" (네가 좋아 (feat. 김효연)); 10. "Morning Bell"; 11. "It's A Hot Night" (화끈한 밤이야); 12. "Going To Change (Bonus Track)" (변해가네)
I Cross the Sea With You (난그대와바다를가르네)	Released: July 12, 2013; Label: Fluxus Music; Format: CD	Track listing: 1. "Hope to Remember the Place" (그 곳은 잠시만); 2. "Please, Please" (하소연); 3. "Your Wedding" (결혼식); 4. "Crying Baby" (우는 아이); 5. "Looking for My Cat" (고양이를 찾습니다); 6. "Birthday Cake" (생일케이크); 7. "I Cross the Sea with You" (난그대와바다를가르네); 8. "Last Day on Earth" (지구별에서의 뜨거운 마지막 밤); 9. "Lullaby (with Kim Hyunmin)" (자장가 (With 김현민)); 10. "Monologue (Studio Live)"; 11. "Pierrot (Studio Live)" (삐에로 (Studio Live))
Good Night (밤새, 안녕히)	Released: March 23, 2016; Label: Fluxus Music; Format: CD	Track listing: 1. "Travel" (여행); 2. "Tear Drop" (왈칵); 3. "I Miss You" (그 곳에 있어줘); 4. "In A Small Room" (좁은 방 안에서); 5. "Good Night" (밤새, 안녕히); 6. "First Snow" (첫 눈); 7. "Satellite" (인공위성); 8. "Mask" (껍질); 9. "Fly" (파리); 10. "While You Were Sleeping" (당신이 잠든 사이); 11. "Little Fish" (물고기)

=== Mini-Albums/EP ===
- [2009.12.07] Boy's Universe
- [2017.03.23] It's okay it's spring
- [2017.09.26] Will it rain today
- [2017.11.27] Snow Waltz
- [2018.04.17] 701 A-side
- [2018.11.02] 701 B-side
- [2020.12.07] Hello Merry Christmas
- [2021.05.11] Your 1g
- [2021.08.04] She knows the future
- [2022.02.15] Rainbow Bridge

=== Movies ===
- Loveholic (2010) / Cameo
- Song of the Same Night (2021) / Cameo (self) / Music Director (나무 Namu: Tree Kim)
- Insomnia (2022) / Music Director (나무 Namu: Tree Kim)
- Song of the Same Night Unplugged (2022) / Music Director (나무 Namu: Tree Kim)
- Starshower (2023 - pre-production)

=== Television ===
- [2010.08.02 - 2010.09.21] I Am Legend - Soo-in's boyband trainees
- [2010.09.01 - 2010.10.21] Playful Kiss - Bong Joon Gu's followers
- [2010.02.24] MBC Music Travel LaLaLa
- [2011.02.12] MBC Show! Music Core
- [2011.02.18] KBS You Hee-yeol's Sketchbook
- [2013.08.10] KBS You Hee-yeol's Sketchbook
- [2015-2017] KBS TV show ‘All That Music’
- [2016.03.04] KBS You Hee-yeol's Sketchbook
- [2017] MBC TV show ‘nanjang’
