= H-Eugene =

South Korean rapper

H-Eugene (H-유진)
- Born: Heo Yujin; April 6, 1979 (age 47); Seoul, South Korea
- Genres: Korean hip hop, K-pop
- Occupations: Rapper; singer
- Instrument: Vocal
- Years active: 2006–present

- H-Eugene
- Hangul: 허유진
- RR: Heo Yujin
- MR: Hŏ Yujin

Heo Eugene (Korean: 허유진; born April 6, 1979), better known by his stage name, H-Eugene (H-유진), is a South Korean rapper known for his collaborations with K-pop stars. The musicians he has collaborated with include MC Mong, Teddy Park, Miryo of Brown Eyed Girls, and Yenny of Wonder Girls. In 2010, he formed the duo H2 with singer Han Soo Yeon.

== Discography ==
=== Studio albums ===
| Title | Album details |
|---|---|
| Only One Way | Released: August 29, 2006 |
| H-Eugene and The Family | Released: February 22, 2008 |

=== Extended plays ===
| Title | Album details |
|---|---|
| Fantastic Duo (환상의 짝꿍) | Released: October 9, 2008 |
| Man On Fire Part 1 | Released: September 13, 2012 |

=== Singles ===
| Title | Year | Peak chart positions | Album |
| Title | Year | KOR | Album |
|---|---|---|---|
| "Maverick" (독불장군) (feat. Yoo Seung-jun) | 2006 | — | Only One Way |
| "Don't Love Me" (날 사랑하지 마요) (feat. J) | 2007 | — | Only One Way |
| "Kiss Me" (feat. Bae Seul-ki) | 2008 | — | H-Eugene And The Family |
| "We Are Not Together" (남이라고) (feat. Shin Ji) | 2008 | — | H-Eugene And The Family |
| "Fantastic Duo" (환상의 짝꿍) (feat. Yeeun of Wonder Girls) | 2008 | — | Fantastic Duo |
| "You in My Heart" (그댄 내 가슴에) (feat. Danny of 1TYM) | 2008 | — | Fantastic Duo |
| "It Must Be Love" (사랑인가봐) (feat. Lyn) | 2009 | — | Non-album singles |
| "Love Series" (사랑시리즈) (feat. Hyemin of Gavy NJ) | 2009 | — | Non-album singles |
| "Love Alarm" (사랑경보) (feat. Joo Hee of 8Eight) | 2009 | 38 | Non-album singles |
| "Heartattack" (마음의 병) (as H2, with Han Soo Yeon) | 2010 | — | Non-album singles |
| "Love Alarm 2" (사랑경보 II) (feat. Sohyang) | 2010 | 38 | Non-album singles |
| "Jikyeojulkke" (지켜줄께) (with J. Junior, feat. Ahn Young-min) | 2011 | 96 | Non-album singles |
| "Ijeul Ttaedo Doendeutande" (잊을 때도 된듯한데) (with BBahn) | 2011 | — | Non-album singles |
| "Party Animal" (feat. Playing Unni) | 2012 | — | Man On Fire Part 1 |
| "Trash" (쓰레기) (feat. Suki) | 2013 | 56 | Non-album singles |
| "ADIOS" (feat. Rumble Fish) | 2014 | — | Non-album singles |
| "Jinjjamyeongpum (Insaeng-ui Jinli)" (진짜명품 (인생의 진리)) | 2014 | — | Non-album singles |
| "Trash Part 2" (쓰레기 Part 2) (feat. Suki) | 2015 | — | Non-album singles |
| "Nameless" (무명) (feat. A-Flow) | 2021 | — | Non-album singles |
| "Love Alarm 2021" (사랑경보 2021) (with Migyo) | 2021 | — | Non-album singles |
| "Good Life" (feat. Jason Ray) | 2022 | — | Non-album singles |
| "I'm Not There" (나는없어) (feat. Yabbi) | 2022 | — | Non-album singles |
"—" denotes releases that did not chart or were not released in that region.
