= Jungyup =

South Korean singer

- 안정엽
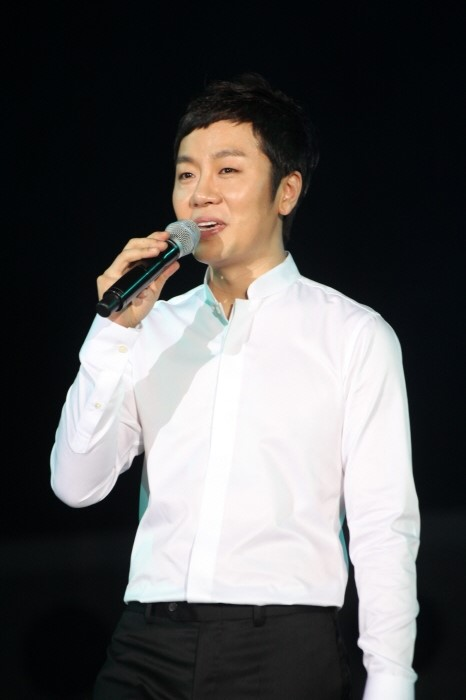
- Born: Ahn Jung-yeop; February 25, 1977 (age 49); Namwon, North Jeolla Province, South Korea
- Occupation: Singer
- Musical career
- Genres: R&B; ballad
- Instrument: Vocals
- Years active: 2003–present
- Label: In Next Music
- Member of: Brown Eyed Soul

Korean name
- Hangul: 안정엽
- RR: An Jeongyeop
- MR: An Chŏngyŏp

Ahn Jung-yeop (Korean: 안정엽, born February 25, 1977), better known by the mononym Jungyup (Korean: 정엽), is a South Korean singer and leader of Brown Eyed Soul, signed under in Next Music. He released his debut solo album, Thinkin` Back On Me on November 3, 2008.

== Discography ==
=== Studio albums ===
Title	Album details	Peak chart positions	Sales
Title	Album details	KOR	Sales
Thinkin' Back On Me	Released: November 3, 2008; Label: In Next Music, CJ E&M; Formats: CD, digital download	49	KOR: 5,131
Part I: Me	Released: October 11, 2011; Label: In Next Music, CJ E&M; Formats: CD, digital download	10	KOR: 5,115
Part II: No More Us	Released: December 12, 2012; Label: In Next Music, CJ E&M; Formats: CD, digital download	8	KOR: 1,998
Merry Go Round	Released: May 15, 2015; Label: In Next Music, CJ E&M; Formats: CD, digital download	10	KOR: 1,041

=== Singles ===
Title	Year	Peak chart positions	Sales (DL)	Album
Title	Year	KOR	Sales (DL)	Album
"You Are My Lady"	2008	81	—N/a	Thinkin' Back On Me
"How Are You" (잘지내)	2009	50	—N/a	non-album singles
"Without You"	2010	35	—N/a	non-album singles
"Flowing Tears" (눈물나)	2011	13	KOR: 727,665	Part I: Me
"Beautiful Lady"	2012	37	KOR: 258,727	non-album singles
"Endless Dream" (꿈이었을까) with Park Myeong-su	2012	—	—N/a	non-album singles
"No More Us" (우리는 없다)	2012	36	KOR: 153,791	Part II: No More Us
"Scent That Brings Love" (향, 사랑을 부르다)	2013	38	KOR: 55,573	non-album singles
"You in the Mirror" (거울속의 너) with Achtung	2014	—	—N/a	non-album singles
"Come With Me Girl"	2015	65	KOR: 29,025	Brown Eyed Soul Single Project
"My Valentine"	2015	97	KOR: 38,467	Merry Go Round
"Island" feat. Uniqnote	2015	—	—N/a	Merry Go Round
"Waltz For You"	2021	—		Waltz For You

=== Soundtrack appearances ===
Title	Year	Peak chart positions	Sales (DL)	Album
Title	Year	KOR	Sales (DL)	Album
"Nothing Better"	2009	—	—N/a	Seoul Warrior Story OST
"Thorn Flower" (가시꽃)	2010	25	—N/a	Bad Guy OST
"There Was Nothing" (아무일도 없었다)	2011	9	KOR: 952,557	49 Days OST
"Just One Step" (한 발짝도 난)	2011	29	KOR: 481,706	49 Days OST
"Farewell Summer" (이별의 여름)	2011	29	KOR: 395,669	From Up on Poppy Hill OST
"I Want To Kiss You" (입 맞추고 싶어요)	2012	26	KOR: 395,168	The Romantic OST
"Why Did You Come Now" (왜 이제야 왔니)	2013	14	KOR: 623,640	I Can Hear Your Voice OST
"Shadow" (그림자)	2015	—	—N/a	Spy OST
"Dazzling Day" (눈부신 하루)	2015	—	—N/a	High Society OST
"That Love" (그 애)	2016	23	KOR: 236,354	The Doctors OST
"Flutters" (설레)	2016	—	—N/a	The Sound of My Heart OST
"Lean On You" (너에게 기울어가)	2016	46	KOR: 131,109	Legend of the Blue Sea OST
"Doors of Time" (시간의 문)	2020	—	—N/a	When the Weather Is Fine OST

=== Other charted songs ===
Title	Year	Peak chart positions	Sales (DL)	Album
Title	Year	KOR	Sales (DL)	Album
"Nothing Better"	2008	—	KOR: 59,198	Thinkin' Back On Me
"Makes No Sense" (말도안돼)	2011	59	KOR: 122,240	Part I: Me
"I Didn't Know Better" (잘 몰랐었다)	2011	75	KOR: 98,659	Part I: Me
"My People" (내 사람들)	2011	84	KOR: 86,042	Part I: Me
"Without Me"	2011	86	KOR: 75,924	Part I: Me
"Without You"	2011	100	KOR: 72,601	Part I: Me
"—" denotes releases that did not chart.

== Filmography ==
=== Television show ===
Year	Title	Role	Ref.
2022	The Second World	Judge	
