= Kim Greem =

South Korean singer (born 1987)

Kim Geu-rim
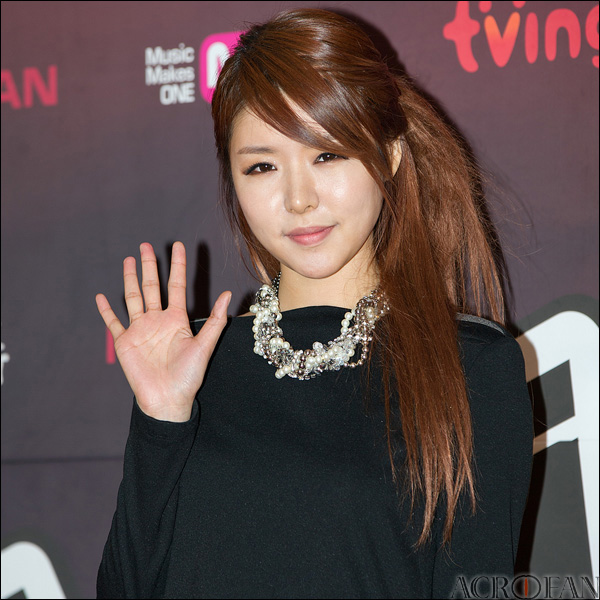
- Kim Greem in 2012
- Born: March 1, 1987 (age 38); South Korea
- Education: Korea University Sejong Campus, Department of English Language and Literature
- Occupation: singer
- Years active: 2011–present
- Agent: Nextar Entertainment

Korean name
- Hangul: 김그림
- RR: Gim Geurim
- MR: Kim Kŭrim

Kim Geu-rim (Korean: 김그림; born March 1, 1987), professionally known as Kim Greem, is a South Korean singer.

== Discography ==
=== Singles ===
Title	Year	Peak chart positions	Sales	Album
Title	Year	KOR	Sales	Album
"There Was Only You" (너밖에 없더라)	2011	12	KOR: 1,079,724	Non-album single
"Your Thought" (니 생각) (with Yoon Jong-shin and Shinchireem)	2011	94	KOR: 57,995	Monthly Project 2011 Yoon Jong Shin
"To You" (너에게)	2012	33	KOR: 398,790	Non-album singles
"Love Song" (연애)	2012	36	KOR: 193,255	Non-album singles
"Just the Two of Us" (우리만 있어) (feat. Kanto and Jihwan)	2013	41	KOR: 68,738	Non-album singles
"This Is Love?" (사랑이란게 뭐 이래요)	2013	61	KOR: 66,184	Non-album singles
"Teardrop" (눈물방울)	2013	81	KOR: 26,416	Non-album singles
"Always Spring Day" (언제나 봄날) (feat. EB)	2014	55	KOR: 34,424	Non-album singles
"Slide to Unlock" (밀어서 잠금해제)	2014	64	KOR: 56,777	Non-album singles
"Summer Night" (여름밤에)	2014	— (Note: "Summer Night" did not enter the Gaon Digital Chart, but it peaked at number 83 on the component Gaon Download Chart.)	KOR: 18,327	Non-album singles
"No Tobacco" (with Bang Jun-ho)	2014	—		Non-album singles
"Love, My Love" (사랑 내사랑) (with Baek Chung-kang)	2014	93	KOR: 19,705	Non-album singles
"My Angel" (힘이 돼줄게)	2014	— (Note: "My Angel" did not enter the Gaon Digital Chart, but it peaked at number 90 on the component Gaon Download Chart.)	KOR: 13,472	Non-album singles
"Be Mine" (내꺼 해요)	2015	94	KOR: 17,724	Non-album singles
"Reason of Love" (연애의 이유)	2015	—		Non-album singles
"Autumn Breezes" (가을이 분다)	2015	— (Note: "Autumn Breezes" did not enter the Gaon Digital Chart, but it peaked at number 90 on the component Gaon BGM Chart.)		Non-album singles
"Butterfly" (feat. Candle)	2015	—		Non-album singles
"Myself?" (어떤그림)	2018	—		Non-album singles
"Foolish Game" (사람이 웃긴게)	2018	—		Non-album singles
"Enough" (그거면됐죠)	2018	— (Note: "Enough" did not enter the Gaon Digital Chart, but it peaked at number 87 on the component Gaon BGM Chart.)		Non-album singles
"Still With You"	2019	— (Note: "Still With You" did not enter the Gaon Digital Chart, but it peaked at number 48 on the component Gaon BGM Chart.)		Non-album singles
"Because of You" (그게 다 너라서)	2019	— (Note: "Because of You" did not enter the Gaon Digital Chart, but it peaked at number 3 on the component Gaon BGM Chart.)		Non-album singles
"Hey"	2020	— (Note: "Hey" did not enter the Gaon Digital Chart, but it peaked at number 54 on the component Gaon BGM Chart.)		Non-album singles
"Tell Me You Like Me" (좋아한다 말할까)	2020	— (Note: "Tell Me You Like Me" did not enter the Gaon Digital Chart, but it peaked at number 70 on the component Gaon BGM Chart.)		Non-album singles
"Hold You" (너를 안을게)	2020	— (Note: "Hold You" did not enter the Gaon Digital Chart, but it peaked at number 63 on the component Gaon BGM Chart.)		Non-album singles
"You Make Me Feel"	2021	— (Note: "You Make Me Feel" did not enter the Gaon Digital Chart, but it peaked at number 60 on the component Gaon BGM Chart.)		Non-album singles
"—" denotes release did not chart.

=== Soundtrack appearances ===
Title	Year	Peak chart positions	Sales	Album
Title	Year	KOR	Sales	Album
"Everything Will Be Okay" (잘될 거야)	2011	70	KOR: 179,611	Romance Town OST
"How Far Have You Come?" (어디까지 온 거니)	2011	93	KOR: 138,603	Can't Lose OST
"Really Fools" (정말 바보야)	2011	59	KOR: 133,872	Ojakgyo Family OST
"It Is a Dream" (꿈인가요)	2013	— (Note: "It Is a Dream" did not enter the Gaon Digital Chart, but it peaked at number 69 on the component Gaon Download Chart.)	KOR: 24,569	Jeon Woo-chi OST
"Just a Good Person" (그냥 좋은 사람)	2014	—		Jang Bo-ri Is Here! OST
"I Do"	2017	—		First Love Again OST
"Only One Person" (단 한사람)	2017	—		The Emperor: Owner of the Mask OST
"I Want To Sleep More" (좀 더 잘래요)	2018	—		Clean with Passion for Now OST
"My Love"	2019	—		It's My Life OST
"Ordinary Days" (일상)	2019	—		I Hate Going to Work OST
"You"	2019	—		My Fellow Citizens! OST
"—" denotes release did not chart.
