= Gavy NJ =

South Korean girl group

- Origin: Seoul, South Korea
- Genres: K-pop; Ballad; R&B
- Years active: 2005–2022; 2025–present
- Labels: DSP Media; Good Fellas; Vitamin; Good Berry
- Members: Naye; Luan; Riel; Yesan
- Past members: Hyemin; Heeyoung; Misty; Sihyeon; Jenny; Gunji; Seorin
- Website: www.dspmedia.co.kr/artist/profile?ca_id=j0

Gavy NJ (Korean: 가비엔제이) is a South Korean girl vocal group that debuted in 2005. The vocal group is currently managed by DSP Media, composed by their fifth generation members that joined in 2025: Naye, Luan, Riel and Yesan.

In 2006, their original label Goodberry Entertainment formed seven-members project group with including Gavy NJ as "Gavy NJ Project Group H7 Miin" prior to renamed as "H7 Miin Project The b" in 2010.

In 2009, original member Jung Hye Min left the group and was replaced by Misty. On November 17, 2011, original member Hee Young was announced to leave the group after finishing the promotion of the digital single "Gaseyo". In April 2012, Misty had left the group and would replaced by additions two new members. Their last original member Sihyun left from the group after her contract had expired in 2016 and was replaced by Seorin.

In December 2022, Jenny announced through her social media that she, Geonji and Seorin had ended their contract with GoodFellas Entertainment in March 2022. Later that months, following the merger of Good Fellas to DSP Media, the vocal group also transferred to DSP with no member. On May 8, 2023, DSP Media officially announced the audition to find new members for Gavy NJ.

On June 30, 2025, Gavy NJ began their activities with release special soundtrack "I Resemble You" for Wavve's drama Namju Research.

In August 2025, DSP Media introduced the fifth-generation member of the vocal group.Gavy NJ officially returned, releasing The Gavy NJ on September 10, which contains three-tracks that are remakes of their previous release.

== Members ==
- 1st Generation : Hyemin (혜민), Heeyoung (희영) and Sihyeon (시현)
- 2nd Generation : Heeyoung (희영), Sihyeon (시현) and Misty (미스티)
- 3rd Generation : Sihyeon (시현), Jenny (제니) and Gunji (건지)
- 4th Generation : Jenny (제니), Gunji (건지) and Seorin (서린)
- 5th Generation : Naye (나예), Luan (루안), Riel (리엘) and Yejan (예잔)

== Discography ==
=== Studio albums ===
Title	Album details	Peak chart positions	Sales
Title	Album details	KOR	Sales
The Very First	Released: November 9, 2005; Label: Good Berry Entertainment; Format: CD, cassette; Track listing: 1. Happiness; 2. To Love You (널 사랑하는데…); 3. But I'll Live (그래도 살아가겠지); 4. Request (부탁); 5. Pride (자존심); 6. Like A Cradle (요람처럼); 7. Steep (절애); 8. Day (하루); 9. Party 2 Night; 10. First Love (첫사랑); 11. Confess To Me (고백하는날); 12. She's My Friend; 13. Tears Of Laughter (웃다가 눈물이나죠)	5	KOR: 68,679+
The Very Surprise	Released: November 15, 2006; Label: Good Berry Entertainment; Format: CD, cassette; Track listing: 1. She Cried (그녀가 울고있네요); 2. Standing On The Other Side (반 대편에 서서); 3. Beautiful Day; 4. Love Poetry (사랑시); 5. Anything (아무말도); 6. Mind ( 명심 / 明心); 7. Again, Again, Again; 8. Comeback; 9. Smile (미소 / 美笑); 10. Love Is Difficult (사랑 어렵죠); 11. Lights (불빛…); 12. Hair (머리칼); 13. Only You	8	KOR: 25,769+
The Beginning	Released: May 26, 2008; Label: Vitamin Entertainment; Format: CD; Track listing: 1. Lie; 2. Blue; 3. It Doesn't Look Like Love (사랑 같은 건 없나봐); 4. Wonky (흔들흔들); 5. Starlight; 6. Fool (바보); 7. The Beginning; 8. Payback; 9. Teary Rain (눈물비); 10. Fox's Diary (여우의 일기); 11. You Do Not (모르니); 12. Violet (Your Song) (바이올렛 (너의 노래))	11	KOR: 9,082+

=== Compilation albums ===
Title	Album details	Peak chart positions	Sales
Title	Album details	KOR	Sales
A Final Reminder	Released: December 12, 2008; Label: Vitamin Entertainment; Format: CD; Track listing: 1. Good Love (착한 사랑); 2. Anytime; 3. She Cried (그녀가 울고있네요); 4. Standing on the Other Side (반 대편에 서서); 5. Happiness; 6. But I'll Live (그래도 살아가겠지); 7. Love Poetry (사랑시); 8. Party 2 Night; 9. Hair (머리칼); 10. Beautiful Day; 11. Steep (절애); 12. Lights (불빛); 13. Request (부탁); 14. To Love You (널 사랑하는데…); 15. Anything (아무말도); 16. Smile (미소 / 美笑)	—N/a	—N/a

=== Extended plays ===
Title	Album details	Peak chart positions	Sales
Title	Album details	KOR	Sales
Heartbreak Hotel	Released: September 24, 2009; Label: Vitamin Entertainment; Format: CD; Track listing: 1. They Said I Have Gotten Thin And Pale (핼쑥해졌대); 2. I Don't Know Why Women Act Like That (왜 그렇게 여자를 몰라); 3. Bye Bye; 4. Honey (허니); 5. Goodbye (잘 가요); 6. Parting Warning	—N/a	—N/a
Sunflower (해바라기)	Released: January 21, 2010; Label: Vitamin Entertainment; Format: CD, digital download; Track listing: 1. Romance Novel 2 (연애소설2); 2. Love Is True (사랑이 그렇습니다); 3. Sunflower (해바라기); 4. Why Did We Break Up (우리가 왜 헤어져); 5. Daddy Long Legs (키다리아저씨); 6. Gift (선물)	4	—N/a
Glossy	Released: November 24, 2010; Label: Good Fellas Entertainment; Format: CD, digital download; Track listing: 1. Pick Up the Phone (전화 좀 받어); 2. Let's Meet Again Tomorrow (내일 또 만나요); 3. Try It Again; 4. Hi…Hi (안녕 안녕..); 5. Let's Stop (그만하자)	17	—N/a
Gavy Effect (가비효과)	Released: May 27, 2011; Label: Good Fellas Entertainment; Format: CD, digital download; Track listing: 1. Everyday; 2. You Know (있잖아…) Heeyoung Solo; 3. You're My Hero (그댄 나의 Hero) Si Hyun Solo; 4. I Hope (바래…) Misty Solo; 5. Vive L'Amour (애정만세); 6. Latte (라떼 한잔)	24	—N/a
Gavish	Released: October 9, 2012; Label: Good Fellas Entertainment; Format: CD, digital download; Track listing: 1. Introduction (소개합니다); 2. Lady Killer; 3. Whatever It Takes (친구의 친구를 사랑했네); 4. On the Boulevard (가로수길에서); 5. Cleaning (청소); 6. Don't Call Me (연락하지마)	24	KOR: 963+
She	Released: October 7, 2014; Label: Good Fellas Entertainment; Format: CD, digital download; Track listing: 1. I Wish (좋겠다); 2. Horn (뿔); 3. Very Sad (딱해); 4. Make Me Love (사랑하게 해줘요); 5. Farewell Theater (이별극장)	23	KOR: 761+
Hello	Released: November 3, 2015; Label: Good Fellas Entertainment; Format: CD, digital download; Track listing: 1. Thank You; 2. Call Me (내게 전화해); 3. Hello; 4. Twenty (스무살); 5. Just Friends (여자사람친구); 6. Ju Ju Ju (친구가 널봤대)	31	—N/a
An Obvious Melo (뻔한 멜로)	Released: February 23, 2017; Label: Good Fellas Entertainment; Format: CD, digital download; Track listing: 1. An Obvious Melo (뻔한 멜로); 2. Eat, Sleep, Miss (먹고 자고 그리워하고); 3. Did You Feel Sorry For Me (미안했을까); 4. Between Us (우리 사이); 5. Shubirubirub (슈비루비룹)	—	—N/a
People Said Break It Up (헤어지래요)	Released: April 1, 2018; Label: Good Fellas Entertainment; Format: CD, digital download; Track listing: 1. People Said Break It Up (헤어지래요); 2. Like You (꼭 너 같던); 3. You Said You Were Happy (행복하댔잖아); 4. Come Pick Me Up (데리러 와); 5. People Said Break It Up (Inst.); 6. Like You (Inst.)	—	—N/a
See You Again (다시 만나자)	Released: July 7, 2019; Label: Good Fellas Entertainment; Format: CD, digital download; Track listing: 1. I Fell Bed (기분 탓); 2. SeogChon Lake (석촌호수); 3. See You Again (다시 만나자); 4. You Look Good (잘 지내나봐); 5. I’m Fine; 6. Nothing better than you (없더라); 7. See You Again (Inst.)	—	—N/a
"—" denotes release did not chart.

=== Singles ===
Title	Year	Peak chart positions	Sales	Album
Title	Year	KOR	Sales	Album
"Happiness"	2005	—N/a	—N/a	The Very First
"But I'll Live" (그래도 살아가겠지	2005	—N/a	—N/a	The Very First
"Steep" (절애)	2005	—N/a	—N/a	The Very First
"Snowman" (눈사람)	2006	—N/a	—N/a	Non-album single
"She Cried" (그녀가 울고있네요)	2006	—N/a	—N/a	The Very Surprise
"Standing On The Other Side" (반 대편에 서서)	2006	—N/a	—N/a	The Very Surprise
"Lie"	2008	—N/a	—N/a	The Beginning
"It Doesn't Look Like Love" (사랑 같은 건 없나봐)	2008	—N/a	—N/a	The Beginning
"Romance Novel" (연애소설)	2009	—N/a	—N/a	Non-album single
"They Said I Have Gotten Thin and Pale" (핼쑥해졌대)	2009	—N/a	—N/a	Heartbreak Hotel
"Love Is True" (사랑이 그렇습니다)	2010	29	—N/a	Sunflower
"Sunflower" (해바라기) feat. Sunnyside MJ	2010	11	—N/a	Sunflower
"Let's Stop" (그만하자)	2010	12	—N/a	Glossy
"Pick Up the Phone" (전화 좀 받어)	2010	18	—N/a	Glossy
"Latte" (라떼 한잔) feat. Gilme	2011	13	—N/a	Latte (Glossy repackage)
"Vive L'Amour" (애정만세)	2011	24	KOR: 244,321	Gavy Effect
"Everyday"	2011	23	KOR: 254,722	Gavy Effect
"I'll Forget" (잊어준다)	2011	25	KOR: 576,911	Forget (Gavy Effect repackage)
"Go Away" (가세요)	2011	30	KOR: 420,414	Non-album single
"You Call Yourself A Man" (그러고도 남자야) feat. Shorry J of Mighty Mouth	2012	11	KOR: 565,989	Non-album single
"Don't Call Me" (연락하지마) feat. LE of EXID	2012	17	KOR: 447,811	Gavish
"On The Boulevard" (가로수길에서) feat. ARA	2012	43	KOR: 184,238	Gavish
"Lady Killer"	2012	23	KOR: 202,777	Gavish
"It's Pretty" (이쁘네요)	2012	46	KOR: 145,257	It's Pretty (Gavish repackage)
"Farewell Theater" (이별극장)	2013	26	KOR: 156,274	She
"How Are You?" (별일없니?)	2014	30	KOR: 69,035	She
"Very Sad" (딱해) feat. Hip Job	2014	70	KOR: 35,624	She
"I Wish" (좋겠다)	2014	42	KOR: 82,107	She
"Ju Ju Ju" (친구가 널봤대) feat. Hip Job	2015	46	KOR: 54,260	Hello
"Just Friends" (여자사람친구)	2015	89	KOR: 41,236	Hello
"Thank You"	2015	48	KOR: 39,936	Hello
"Hello" feat. Hip Job	2015	61	KOR: 33,130	Hello
"Shubirubirub" (슈비루비룹)	2016	—	—N/a	An Obvious Melo
"Did You Feel Sorry for Me" (미안했을까)	2016	77	KOR: 23,515	An Obvious Melo
"An Obvious Melo" (뻔한 멜로)	2017	—	KOR: 15,749	An Obvious Melo
"You Said You Were Happy" (행복하댔잖아)	2017	47	KOR: 31,156	People Said Break It Up
"People Said Break It Up" (헤어지래요)	2018	— (Note: "People Said Break It Up" didn't enter Gaon Digital Chart, but peaked 75 position on the Gaon Download Chart)	—N/a	People Said Break It Up
"I'm Fine"	2018	—	—N/a	See You Again
"Nothing better than you" (없더라)	2019	148	—N/a	See You Again
"See You Again" (다시 만나자)	2019	165	—N/a	See You Again
"I'm in Sinchon" (신촌에 왔어)	2020	96	—N/a	TBA
"X-Girlfriend" (전 여친)	2020	127	—N/a	TBA
"Last Christmas"	2020	—	—N/a	TBA
"Love Story (2021)" (연애소설)	2021	139	—N/a	TBA
"—" denotes release did not chart.

=== Collaborations ===
Year	Title	Other Artist(s)
2011	"Love Is The Same" (사랑은 똑같다)	Monday Kiz
2011	"Bing Bing Bing" (빙빙빙)	Monday Kiz
2012	"Cleaning" (청소)	Postmen
2013	"Tears Come" (눈물이 핑돌아)	The SeeYa
2014	"Let Me Love You" (사랑하게 해줘요)	6 To 8
2016	"Between Us" (우리 사이)	6 To 8

=== Soundtrack appearances ===
Year	Title	Drama
2008	"Remember"	Fate OST
2009	"A Good Day Without You" (그대없이 좋은날)	Swallow The Sun OST
2010	"Nobody Knows" (아무도 모르죠)	A Man Called God OST
2011	"I Love You" (당신을 사랑합니)	Listen to My Heart OST
2011	"I Look By" (바라봐요)	Ojakgyo Family OST
2011	"Maybe I Like You" (어쩌면 좋아)	Color of Woman OST
2012	"When the Sun Sets" (노을이 지면)	Bridal Mask OST
2014	"Rewind"	My Lovely Girl OST
2014	"Snowflake" (눈꽃)	4 Legendary Witches OST
2016	"Want A Love" (사랑하고 원했죠)	Blow Breeze OST
2017	"Affection" (애심)	The Emperor: Owner of the Mask OST
2018	"What I only want to say to you" (네게만 하고픈 말)	My Healing Love OST
