= Korea Spotlight =

Annual music concert in Austin, Texas

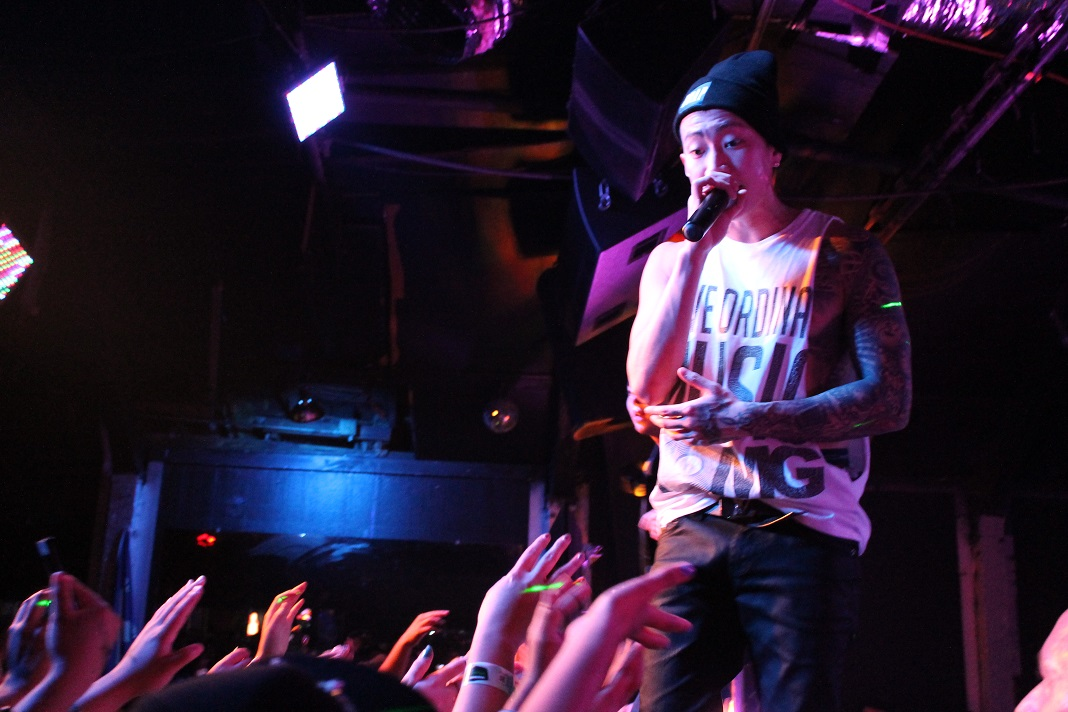
- Jay Park, 2014 KPNO
- Genre: K-pop, various
- Frequency: Annual
- Inaugurated: 2013
- Organizer: KOCCA
- Website: eng.kocca.kr

Korea Spotlight, originally named K-Pop Night Out at SXSW (KPNO), is an annual concert of South Korean artists held, organized by Korea Creative Content Agency (KOCCA).

== Background ==
In March 2013, f(x) was the first K-pop band invited to the SXSW music festival and conference, and performed at a music showcase, KPNO, organized by KOCCA. KOCCA, along with support from the Ministry of Culture, Sports and Tourism, followed up with the SXSW KPNO after hosting one at Marché International du Disque et de l'Edition Musicale (Midem), held in Cannes, France; with the purpose of encouraging exports of Korean music and K-pop in particular.

During the five days of the SXSW music festival, bands (about 2,200 in 2012) are spread out over venues (about 100 in 2012) in downtown Austin's nightclubs and street stages; described as an experience where fans meet musicians close-up, without special effects. The first KPNO in 2013 was scheduled at the Elysium nightclub, where SXSW's oldest Asian showcase, Japan Nite, was also held.

In addition to one or two well known K-pop artists, the event also showcases underground and lesser-known artists from a wide range of genres, including garage rock, hip hop and punk rock. Although 2013 was the first year for an official K-pop concert at SXSW, South Korean bands of other genres had first performed at the festival, starting with YB in 2007. The SXSW Seoulsonic event also schedules South Korean artists. K-pop had already been a featured workshop at the SXSW conference line-up in 2012.

SXSW K-pop and Korean rock groups are supported locally by Mandoo Entertainment, an entertainment company based in Austin, Texas, who works in conjunction with KOCCA.

== History ==
=== 2013 ===
KPNO '13 was held on March 13 at Elysium in Austin, Texas. Music artists that performed were f(x), Galaxy Express, The Geeks, Guckkasten, Jeong Cha Sik, Yi Sung Yol, and No Brain. SXSW released an article "K-Pop Night Out at SXSW" and included f(x) on their SXSWorld Magazine cover for the month.

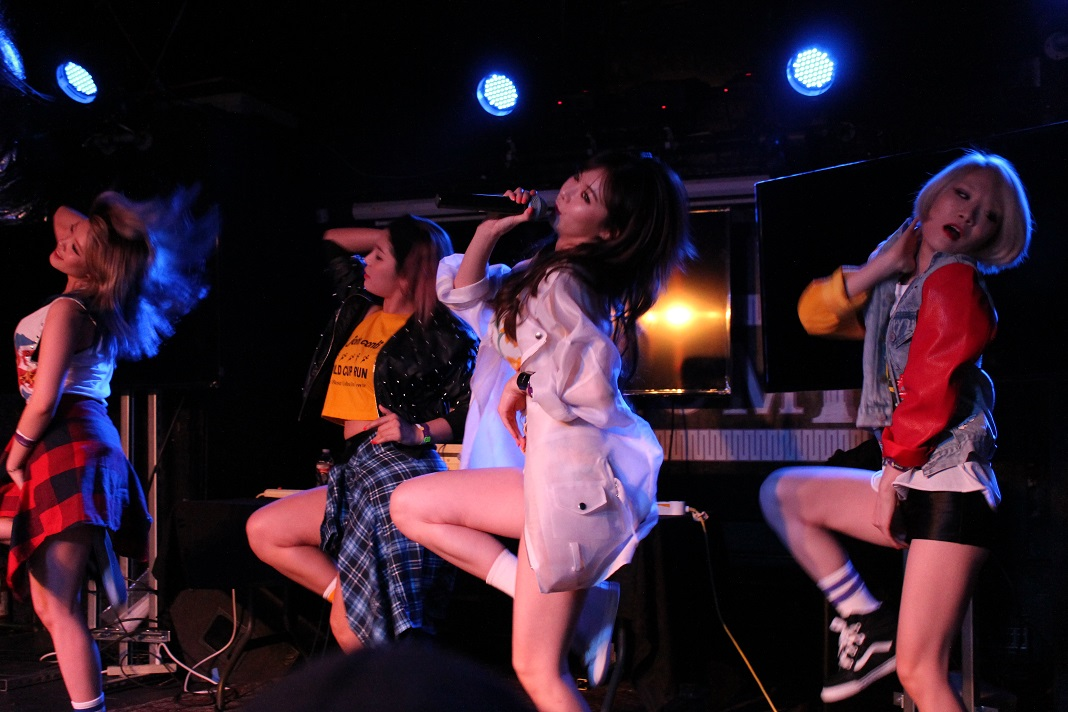
Hyuna, 2014 KPNO

=== 2014 ===
KPNO '14 was held on March 11, again at Elysium, in Austin. Artists were Hyuna, Jay Park, Nell, Crying Nut, Idiotape, and Jambinai. Kiha & The Faces were scheduled, but could not make it, and replaced by Hollow Jan. Reporter August Brown of the Los Angeles Times described the KPNO showcase as "one of the club-circuit's hotter tickets." Lady Gaga created a stir when she attended the set for Jay Park, causing media to conjecture whether she had been scouting possible opening acts for her ArtRave: The Artpop Ball tour, after she signed on Crayon Pop.

=== 2015 ===
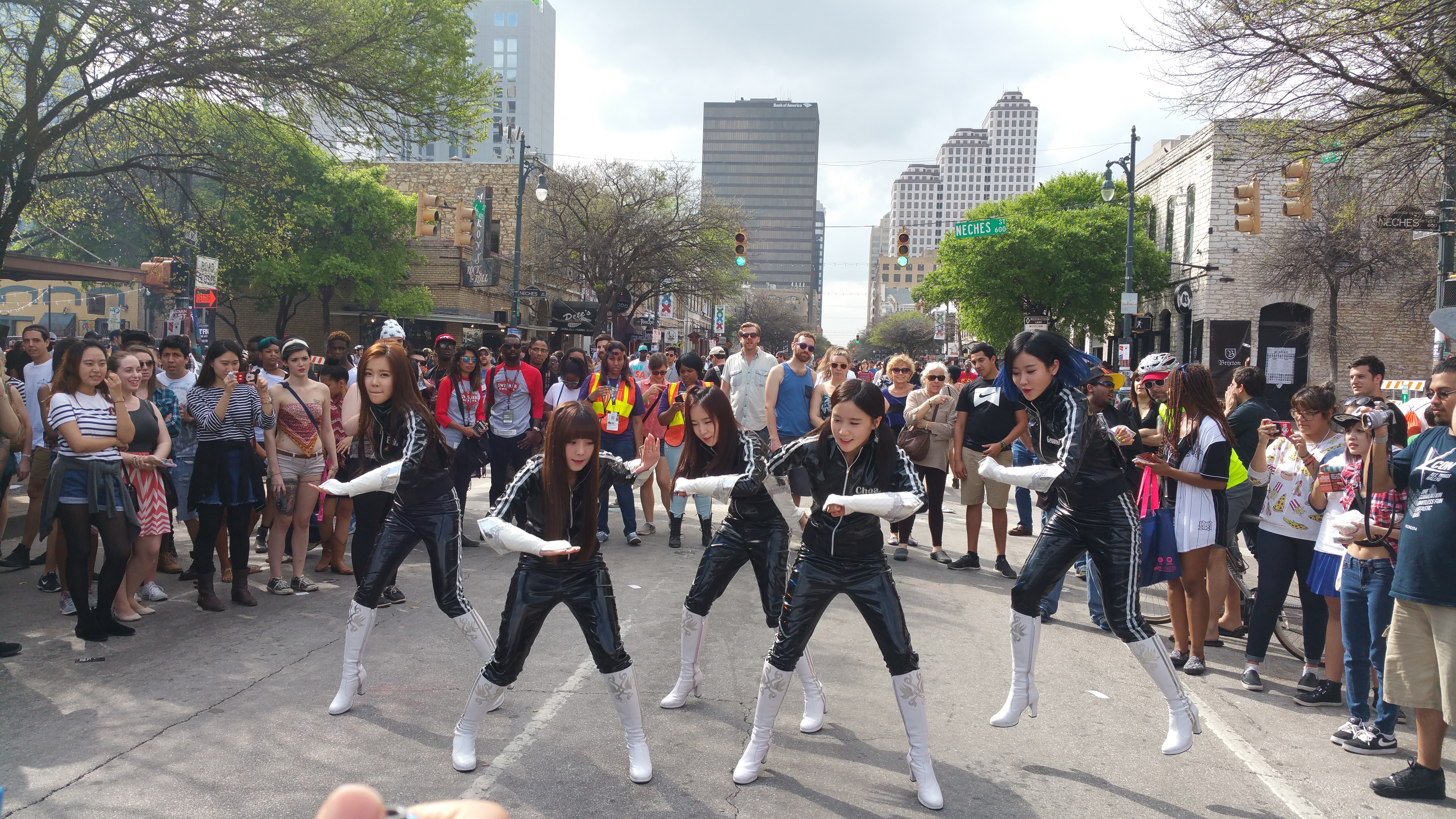
Crayon Pop, 2015 KPNO, filming on Austin streets before concert.

KPNO '15 was held on March 19, again at Elysium. The line-up included Crayon Pop, Epik High, Asian Chairshot, EE, Eastern sidekick, Hitchhiker, The Barberettes.

Prior to the concert, Crayon Pop filmed on Austin's streets, and Epik High's Tablo told Billboard K-Town journalists they were excited for their first U.S. tour since 2009. Composer and DJ Hitchhiker made a surprise appearance, in his shiny astronaut like costume, at the tradeshow's NASA booth.

This year's line-up was noted for a wider variety of genres, unique costumes and visual effects. And the audience, which appeared to have grown by about twenty percent over 2014, shouted out fan chants "bar, bar, bar" before the Crayon Pop hit song, in unison, and during Epik High's stage, called out Hangul lyrics, along with the English refrains. A reviewer commenting on the typical cynicism SXSW attendees sometimes feel about "buzz-bands", like Epik High, noted the awed reactions of "those new and unfamiliar to Korean popular music". In SXSW Twitter results, Tablo was one of the top five most mentioned artists, and Epik High was one of the top ten hashtags and trends.

=== 2016 ===
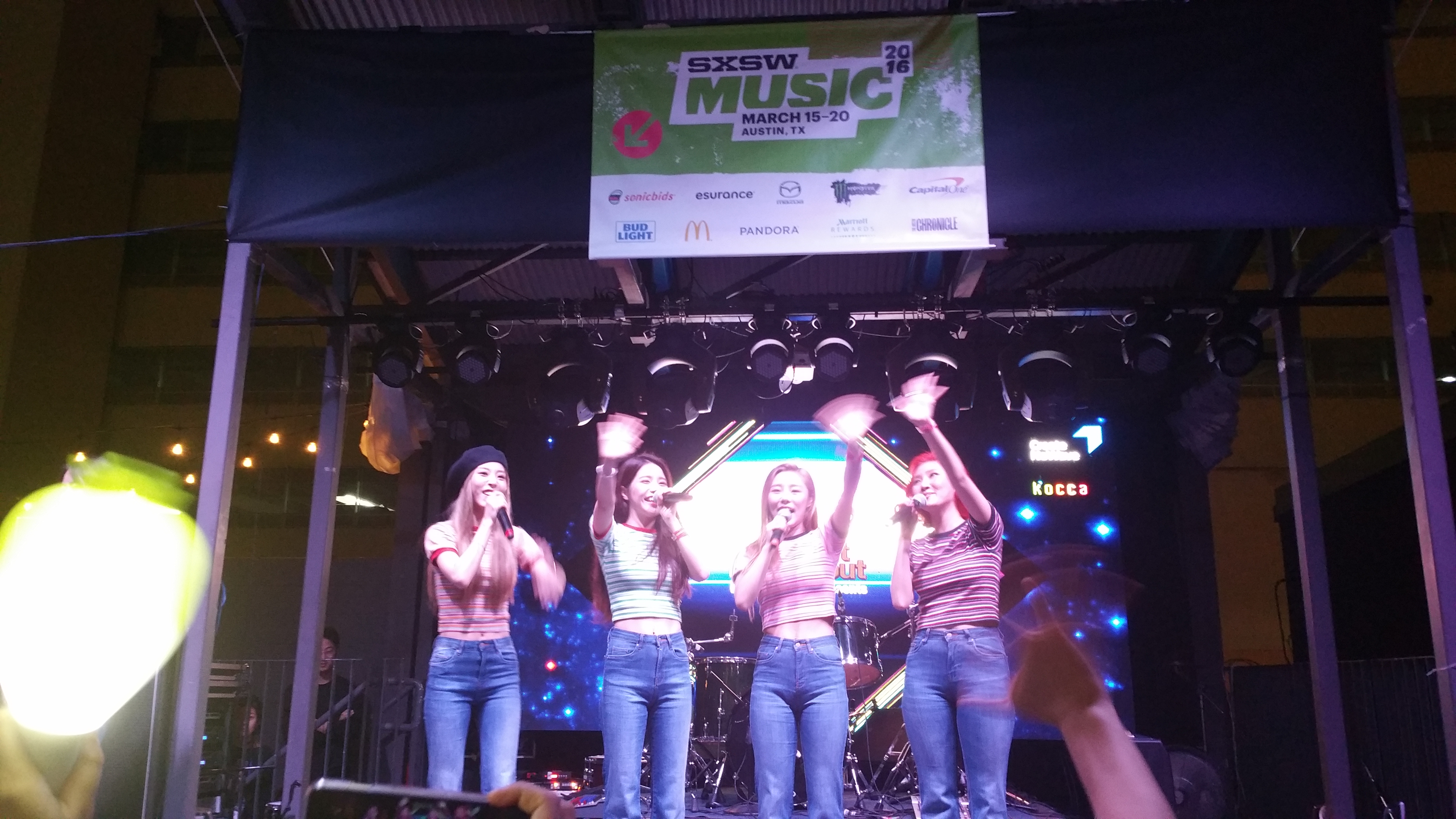
Mamamoo, 2016 KPNO

KPNO '16 was held on March 16, at a first-time location in Austin, The Belmont with performers Zion.T and band The Session, Dean, Mamamoo, Love X Stereo, Haihm, Bye Bye Badman, Victim Mentality.

Attendance increased for this year to 1,300 fans, some lining up hours before the show and a general admission line of three blocks long. Grammy Award-winning American singer-songwriter Siedah Garrett made a surprise appearance. She told Mamamoo her favorite song of the night was their "Taller Than You"; and responding to whether she would like to work with them, she said, "Yes, as soon as possible. They are amazing."

Dean responded to the warm welcome he received at his first performance at a major international music festival, that the underage girls hanging around in the parking lot next to the stage area (to hear the music, though they couldn't see the stage) made him feel like Justin Bieber.

=== 2017 ===
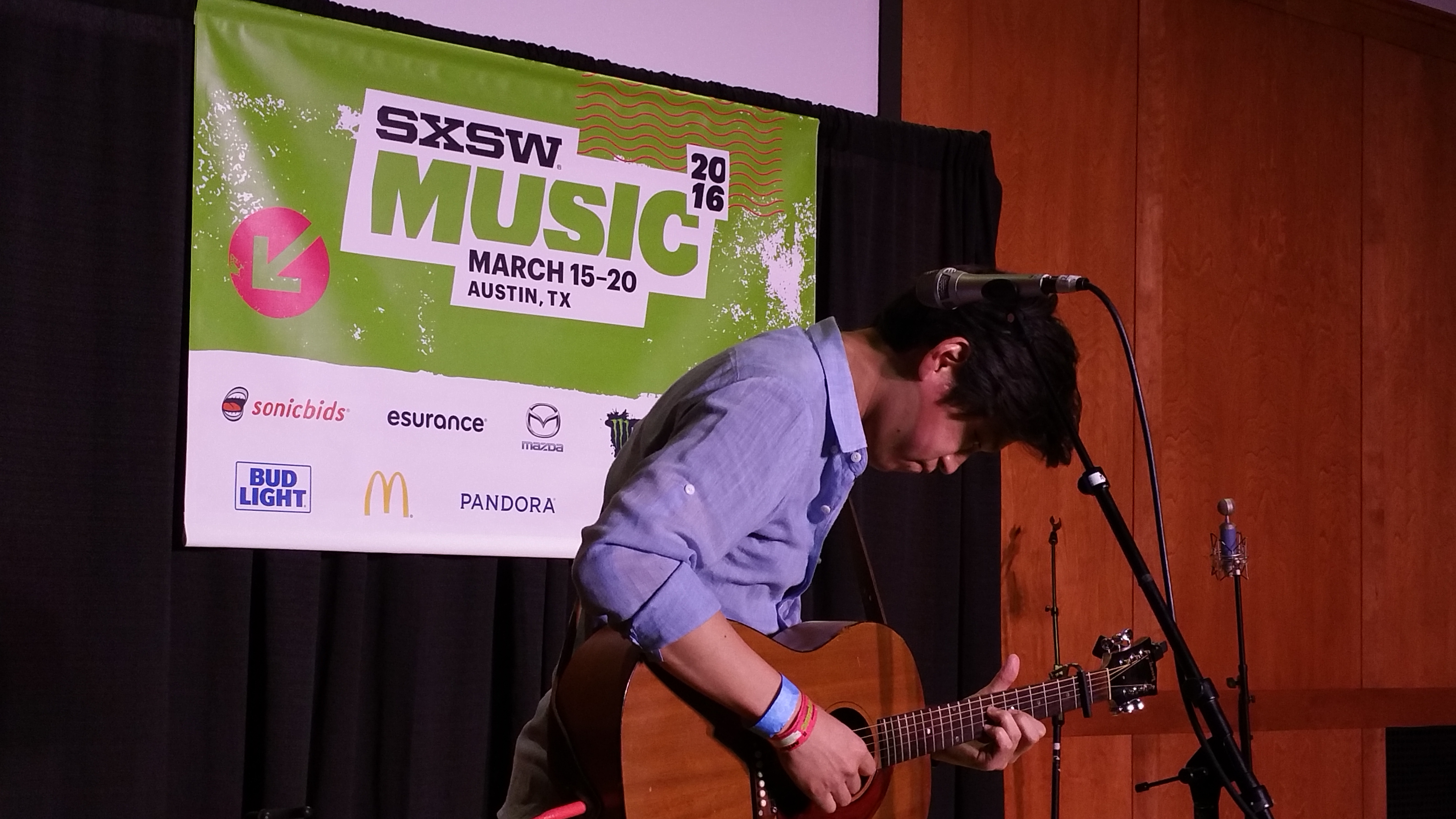
Big Phony (Bobby Choy) performing at SXSW 2016

KPNO '17 was held on March 17, for a second time at The Belmont, with artists Big Phony, Galaxy Express, No Brain, MFBTY (Tiger JK, Yoon Mi-rae and Bizzy), Hyolyn of Sistar, and Red Velvet, with about 2,500 in attendance.

As in prior years, the concert included other genres of South Korean music besides K-pop. About the upcoming trip to SXSW, punk rock band No Brain's leader and vocalist Lee Sung-woo said, "I think it's important to show off our own colors (as an artist). Some Asian artists tend to get timid in a foreign country, but the music is a language in itself." And Korean hip-hop's Tiger JK said, "There's no exact answer (on how to be successful overseas), but I think trying your best to make your own kind of music would give you the best shot."

The meet-and-greet artist experience included a "MU:CON K-Pop Industry Party," and media contacts with Big Phony, Galaxy Express, Tiger JK, Yoon Mi-rae, and Red Velvet. Other artists joined the line-up, including Busker Busker's U.S. born Brad Moore with Big Phony's set, and members of Tiger JK's Feel Ghood Music label, singer-producer Ann One and newly signed Junoflo, a hip-hop artist and prior contestant on Show Me the Money 5.

It was a return to her Texas birthplace for Yoon Mi-rae. Hyolyn extended her U.S. trip with concerts at clubs in New York and Los Angeles, and K-pop headliner Red Velvet traveled on to KCON Mexico for a following night's concert. Red Velvet received fan gifts onstage, including a can of her favorite Pringles for Seulgi, and Yeri, who had researched Texas online, said in an interview that she hoped to have time to eat steak before leaving.

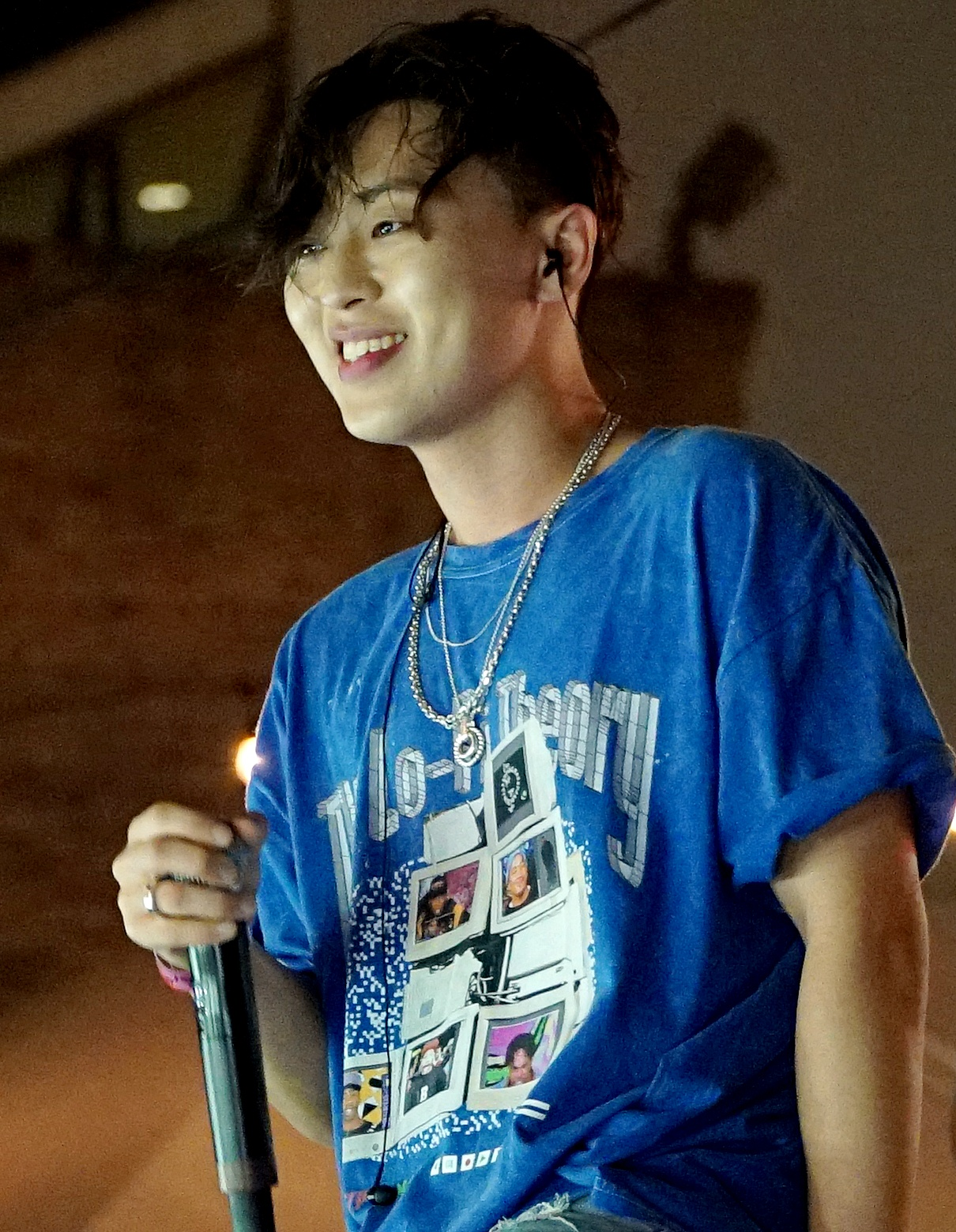
DPR Live, 2018 Korea Spotlight

=== 2018: Name change to Korea Spotlight ===
The event, with a name change to Korea Spotlight, was held on March 16, again at The Belmont, with artists: Crush (R&B soloist), Lee Hi (K-pop soloist), K.A.R.D (K-pop co-ed quartet), DPR Live (hip-hop), CIFIKA (pop-futurist), Junoflo (hip-hop) and Say Sue Me (indie rock).

=== 2019 ===
The 2019 event was held on March 13, at a new venue, Austin City Limits Live at the Moody Theater (ACL Live), with the line-up of artists: K-pop performers iKon and Chungha, EDM producer Hitchhiker, experimental rock group Jambinai, hip hop duo XXX and solo electronic artist Kirara.

== Reception ==
In 2013, The Japan Times said, "K-Pop Night Out — an event featuring only one act one could describe as "pop" — reveled in being Korean," and New York City's Fuse TV staff listed f(x) as one of the "30 Must-See Acts at SXSW 2013".

In 2014, Korea.net said "Famous U.S. pop singer Lady Gaga surprised the audience by showing up to enjoy the live concert, reflecting her strong interest in K-pop." And the Los Angeles Times said of Hyuna's set, "...the very polyglot crowd at her short but packed-out showcase implied that K-pop has crossed the finish line into an established genre in America."

In 2015, the Barberettes were placed on four "best" lists, NPR's All Songs Considered, and two women's magazines, Marie Claire and Bitch, and a newspaper, the San Jose Mercury News. And MTV Iggy said that KPNO "now felt like part of SXSW's DNA" and had become a "newly-minted staple" for Korean music at SXSW.

In the 2017 announcements, Thomas Fawcett of The Austin Chronicle said, "If The Black Eyed Peas were Korean they'd be Drunken Tiger," and staff at theguardian.com wrote, "Of the officially sanctioned slots, you'd struggle to find a more fun-sounding evening than the K-Pop Night Out..., where Red Velvet, Hyolyn of SISTAR and the hip-hop stars Drunken Tiger all preach the gospel of Seoul."

Year	Location	Country	Artist Line-up
2013	Elysium	U.S.A	f(x), Galaxy Express, The Geeks, Guckkasten, Jeong Cha Sik, Yi Sung Yol, No Brain
2014	Elysium	U.S.A	Hyuna, Jay Park, Nell, Crying Nut, Idiotape, Jambinai
2015	Elysium	U.S.A	Crayon Pop, Epik High, Asian Chairshot, EE, Eastern sidekick, Hitchhiker, The Barberettes
2016	The Belmont	U.S.A	Zion.T with The Session, Dean, Mamamoo, Love X Stereo, Haihm, Bye Bye Badman, Victim Mentality
2017	The Belmont	U.S.A	MFBTY, Hyolyn, Red Velvet, No Brain, Galaxy Express, Big Phony
2018	The Belmont	U.S.A	Crush, Lee Hi, K.A.R.D, DPR Live, CIFIKA, Junoflo, Say Sue Me
2019	ACL Live	U.S.A	iKon, Chungha, Hitchhiker, Jambinai, XXX, Kirara
2023	Auditorio BB	Mexico	pH-1, W24, SURL, Lacuna, Say Sue Me
2023	Coca-Cola Arena	United Arab Emirates	Hwasa, Chanyeol, YooA, MCND, The Wind, ADYA
2023	Spielbudenplatz	Germany	Glen Check, ADOY, cotoba, Lil Cherry, Goldbuuda
2023	SXSW Sydney	Australia	CIFIKA, Silica Gel, HYUNHEE
2023	Spotify O-EAST	Japan	Jeong Hongil, SOLE, NELL, ADOY, Gaho
2023	Forum Event Space	Kazakhstan	DPR IAN, W24, THE SOLUTIONS, MUSTB, KISU
2024	Auditorio BB	Mexico	Rocky, Zior Park, W24, Cotoba
2024	Spotify O-EAST	Japan	Glen Check, SURL, cotoba, HYPNOSIS THERAPY, LIM KIM , Aile The Shota
2025	Sala Paral·lel 62	Spain	Chung Ha, Billlie, SHAUN, NouerA, Big Ocean
2025	Auditorio BB	Mexico	10CM, cotoba, Meaningful Stone, Hypnosis Therapy
2025	Shibuya Stream Hall	Japan	Dragon Pony, CHEEZE, KARDI, Lee Seung Yoon, Dabda, DYGL
2025	Namba Hatch	Japan	Dragon Pony, CHEEZE, KARDI, Lee Seung Yoon, Dabda, PEDRO
2026	Pepsi Center	Mexico	Winner, Soyou, Dayoung, TOUCHED, ALPHA DRIVE ONE
2026	Sala Razzmatazz	Spain	BIBI, Soyou, Billlie, oceanfromtheblue
