= 22nd Korean Music Awards =

2025 South Korean music award ceremony

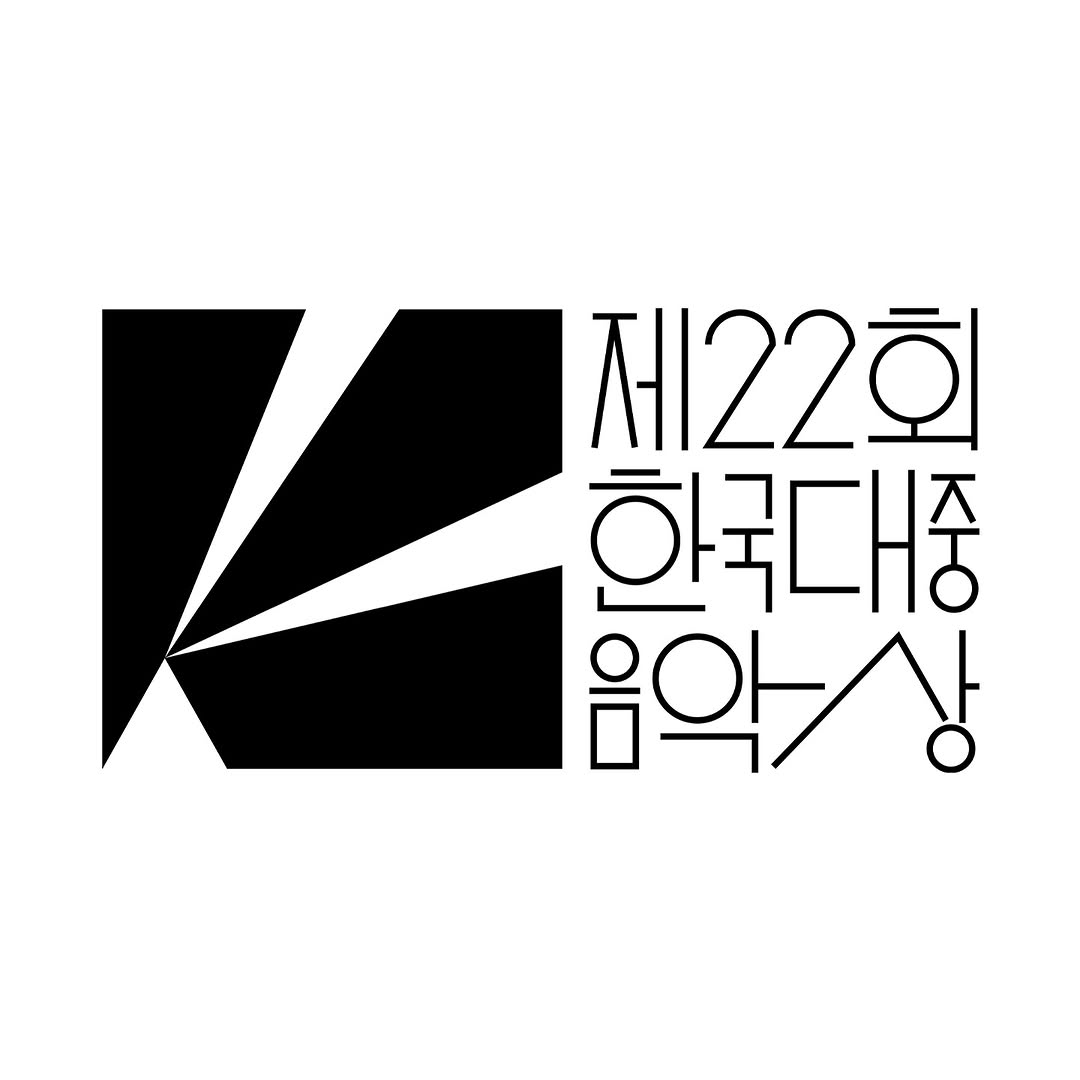
- Date: February 27, 2025
- Location: Seoul, South Korea
- Hosted by: Moon Sang-hoon

Highlights
- Most awards: Aespa; Lee Seung-yoon (3)
- Most nominations: Danpyunsun and the Moments Ensemble (6)
- Musician of the Year: Lee Seung-yoon
- Album of the Year: Danpyunsun and the Moments Ensemble – Hail to the Music
- Song of the Year: Aespa – "Supernova"
- Website: koreanmusicawards.com

Television/radio coverage
- Network: PRIZM Live; YouTube

The 22nd Korean Music Awards was held in Seoul, South Korea on February 27, 2025. Hosted by the Korean Music Awards Selection Committee and sponsored by the Ministry of Culture, Sports and Tourism and the Korea Creative Content Agency, the ceremony recognized the best music released in South Korea between December 1, 2023, and November 30, 2024.

Unlike other South Korean music awards, the Korean Music Awards are based on musical achievement rather than record sales. Winners are determined by the Korean Music Awards Selection Committee, which comprises music critics, radio show producers, academics, and other music industry professionals. Nominations were announced on February 6, 2025, through its official website and YouTube channel.

Indie group Danpyunsun and the Moments Ensemble received the most nominations with six, followed by girl group Aespa with five.

Aespa and Lee Seung-yoon were the biggest winners of the night, each taking home three awards, with Aespa taking Song of the Year and Lee Seung-yoon earning Musician of the Year. Meanwhile, Danpyunsun and the Moments Ensemble won Album of the Year.

== Winners and nominees ==
Winners are listed first, highlighted in boldface, and indicated with a double dagger (‡). Nominees are listed in alphabetical order.

=== General field ===
| **Album of the Year**: **Danpyunsun and the Moments Ensemble – Hail to the Music** ‡; Aespa – Armageddon; Hyukoh & Sunset Rollercoaster – AAA; Silica Gel – Power Andre 99; Sumin & Slom – Miniseries 2 | **Song of the Year**: **Aespa – "Supernova"** ‡; Bibi – "Bam Yang Gang"; Danpyunsun and the Moments Ensemble – "Independent"; Sumin & Slom – "Why, Why, Why"; Rosé & Bruno Mars – "APT." |
| **Musician of the Year**: **Lee Seung-yoon** ‡; Aespa; Danpyunsun and the Moments Ensemble; Rosé; Silica Gel | **Rookie of the Year**: **Sanmanhan** ‡; Hyelyn Joo; Illit; Meeroo Choi; SamSan; TWS |

=== Genre categories ===
| **Best K-pop Album**: **Aespa – Armageddon** ‡; (G)I-dle – 2; Riize – Riizing: Epilogue; TripleS – Assemble24; Yves – I Did | **Best K-pop Song**: **Aespa – "Supernova"** ‡; Illit – "Magnetic"; Rosé & Bruno Mars – "APT."; TripleS – "Girls Never Die"; TWS – "Plot Twist" |
| **Best Pop Album**: **John Park – PSST!** ‡; Kim Yuna – Tale of Sensuality; Rooftop Moonlight – 40; Savina & Drones – Lasha; Sunwoo Jung-a – Beyond | **Best Pop Song**: **Bibi – "Bam Yang Gang"** ‡; IU – "Love Wins All"; Lee Young-ji – "Small Girl" (featuring D.O.); Rooftop Moonlight – "Diving"; Sunwoo Jung-a – "Star Candy" |
| **Best Rock Album**: **Soumbalgwang – Fire & Light** ‡; Kim Soo-chul – Kim Soo-chul 45th Anniversary Where Are You; Lee Seung-yoon – Yeok Seong; MONO4OLY – Ordinary Chaos; Seoulbusanincheon – Wrecking Havoc | **Best Rock Song**: **Lee Seung-yoon – "Anthems of Defiance"** ‡; Kim Soo-chul – "Where Are You"; Danpyunsun and the Moments Ensemble – "Independent"; Bongjeingan – "Know You Did"; MONO4OLY – "Fake Empire" |
| **Best Modern Rock Album**: **Danpyunsun and the Moments Ensemble – Hail to the Music** ‡; Hyukoh & Sunset Rollercoaster – AAA; Leaves Black – Flight; Meaningful Stone – Angel Interview; Silica Gel – Power Andre 99 | **Best Modern Rock Song**: **Lee Seung-yoon – "Waterfall"** ‡; Danpyunsun and the Moments Ensemble – "Days Happier Than Today Will Be Few in My Remaining Life"; Hanroro – "H O M E"; Hyukoh & Sunset Rollercoaster – "Young Man"; Wave to Earth – "Annie." |
| **Best Electronic Album**: **Net Gala – Galapaggot** ‡; Gazaebal – Texture Music: 2011 - 2020; HWI– Humanly Possible; Hypnosis Therapy – Raw Survival; Various Artists – SCA2 | **Best Electronic Song**: **Mount XLR – "Oving"** ‡; Haepaary – "The Night"; HWI – "Your My Past Lives"; Hypnosis Therapy – "Blaze"; Swimrabbit – "Evolution" (featuring Hunjiya) |
| **Best Rap & Hip-Hop Album**: **B-Free & Hukky Shibaseki – Free Hukky Shibaseki & the God Sun Symphony Group: Odyssey. 1** ‡; EK – Escape; Garion – Garion 3; Kwaii – Distorted; O'Koye – Whether the Weather Changes or Not | **Best Rap & Hip-Hop Song**: **G-Dragon – "Power"** ‡; B-Free & Hukky Shibaseki – "INDO"; Fleeky Bang – "Fire" (featuring Changmo); Kawaii – "Pride"; QM – "Got Yourself A Gun" (featuring Zico) |
| **Best R&B & Soul Album**: **Sumin & Slom – Miniseries 2** ‡; BRWN – Monsoon; JINBO the SuperFreak, Hersh & PoPoMo – PoPoMo; Jung-in & Mild Beats – Jung In & Mild Beats; Sole – Time Machine | **Best R&B & Soul Song**: **Jung-in & Mild Beats – "Blame"** ‡; Hyelyn Joo – "Crazy"; John Park – "Like A Dream"; Sole – "Still Love"; Sumin & Slom – "Why, Why, Why" |
| **Best Folk Album**: **Moher – Kaleidoscope** ‡; Kang A-sol – From Where No One Is, To Where Everyone Is; Kim Sa-wol – Default; Sanmanhan – Sanmanhan; Xeuda – How Can I Tell You Love | **Best Folk Song**: **Kang A-sol – "Anyone But Me"** ‡; Meroo Choi – "Dap"; Moher – "Baksugijeong"; Sanmanhan – "When It Becomes A Song"; Xeuda – "How Can I Tell You Love" |
| **Best Metal & Hardcore Album**: **Seaweed Mustache – 2** ‡; Fecundation – Moribund; The Holy Mountain – The Holy Mountain; Materials Pound – Bulb; Sahon – Blood Shall Be Paid | **Best Global Contemporary Album**: **Bando – Shape of the Land** ‡; Dulabam – Dulabam; Hwang Min-wang – [Jang:dan] (with Satoshi Takeishi); Kim Ji-hye – Pado; Liberosis – Re-mind; Nubim – Crossroads (Live in Amsterdam) |
| **Best Jazz Album**: **Nam Ye-ji – Old Songs, Tmmm** ‡; Cho Hae-in – Sight Beyond Sight; Kim Min-hee – Confession; Kim Ju-hwan – After Midnight: Still in the Moonlight; Na Yoon-sun – Elles | **Best Jazz Instrumental Album**: **Jihye Lee Orchestra – Infinite Connections** ‡; Pudditorium – Prologue: Hope; Sunji Lee – Eternal; Teho – Pierrot le Fumeur; Yun Seok-cheol Trio – My Summer's Not Over Yet |

=== Special awards ===
- Lifetime Achievement Award – Lee Ho-jun
- Selection Committee Special Award – Live Club Day

== Multiple awards ==
The following artist(s) received two or more awards:

| Count | Artist(s) |
|---|---|
| 3 | Aespa |
| 3 | Lee Seung-yoon |
| 2 | Danpyunsun and the Moments Ensemble |
