= Sunday Night =

Sunday Night refers to television shows:

- Sunday Night (Australian TV program), an Australian news and current affairs program
- Sunday Night (American TV program), a late-night television show
- Sunday Night with Megyn Kelly, an American news program
- Sunday Night (South Korean TV series), a South Korean television entertainment programme
- Sunday Night, a 2006–2009 Russian news commentary program on NTV
- "Sunday Night", a 2020 song by W24
