= 杏 =

杏 is a Chinese character meaning "apricot" in Chinese culture, and may refer to:

- Japanese feminine given names
  - An (given name)
  - Ann (given name)
  - Anne (given name)
  - Anzu (given name)
  - Kyo (given name)
- Khitan scripts
  - "Country" for Khitan large script
  - "Ox" for Khitan small script
- To Father (杏), 2013 Chinese film starring Lan Yingying

== See also ==
- Apricot (disambiguation)
