= The Barberettes =

South Korean female doo-wop group

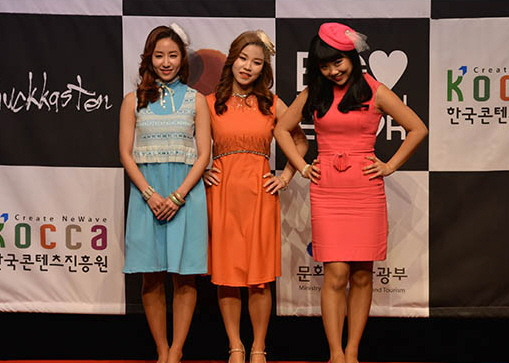
- So Hee Park, Sunnie Lee Kyeong, Shinae An Wheeler, Midem 2016.

Background information
- Origin: Seoul, South Korea
- Genres: Doo-wop, Korean retro, ballads, K-pop
- Years active: 2012–2019
- Label: EggPlant
- Members: Sunnie Lee Kyeong; Shinae An Wheeler
- Past members: Grace Kim; So Hee Park
- Website: www.facebook.com/TheBarberettesKorea/ (in Korean)

The Barberettes (Korean: 바버렛츠) is a South Korean retro, doo-wop female group that debuted in 2014 as a trio, and is based in Seoul. With their covers and original music, they reproduce the sound of the 50s-60s music, and are referred to as a time slip girl group who travel back to the times of barbershop music and harmonizing girl groups. The group is composed of Shinae An Wheeler (Korean: 안신애) and Seon (or Sunnie) Lee Kyeong (Korean: 이경선). In 2019 The Barberettes and Sweet Sorrow form a harmony collab group SBSB (Korean: 스바스바).

== Background ==
The group started singing, as a trio, for fun in October 2012, when Wheeler had the idea of creating a retro-inspired girl group. Wheeler and Grace Kim were already singing solo for the same jazz band, and Park began taking vocal lessons from Wheeler. They performed at a number of places, including the indie music venues in the Hongdae area near Hongik University in Seoul, and for audiences of the older Korean generation, releasing their first album on May 27, 2014.

The name "Barberettes" was chosen because they wanted to name themselves after the a cappella barbershop music style, hoping to use a name like "Barbershop Quartet", but lacking a fourth member, they added the suffix "ettes", like many girl groups of the 1950s and 1960s.

They often use one microphone for performances, initially to imitate that era's girl groups, but later realizing the advantage when they found they could hear each other better, which helped them control the harmony balance. They also use costumes, make-up and choreography to re-create the effect.

== Musical style ==
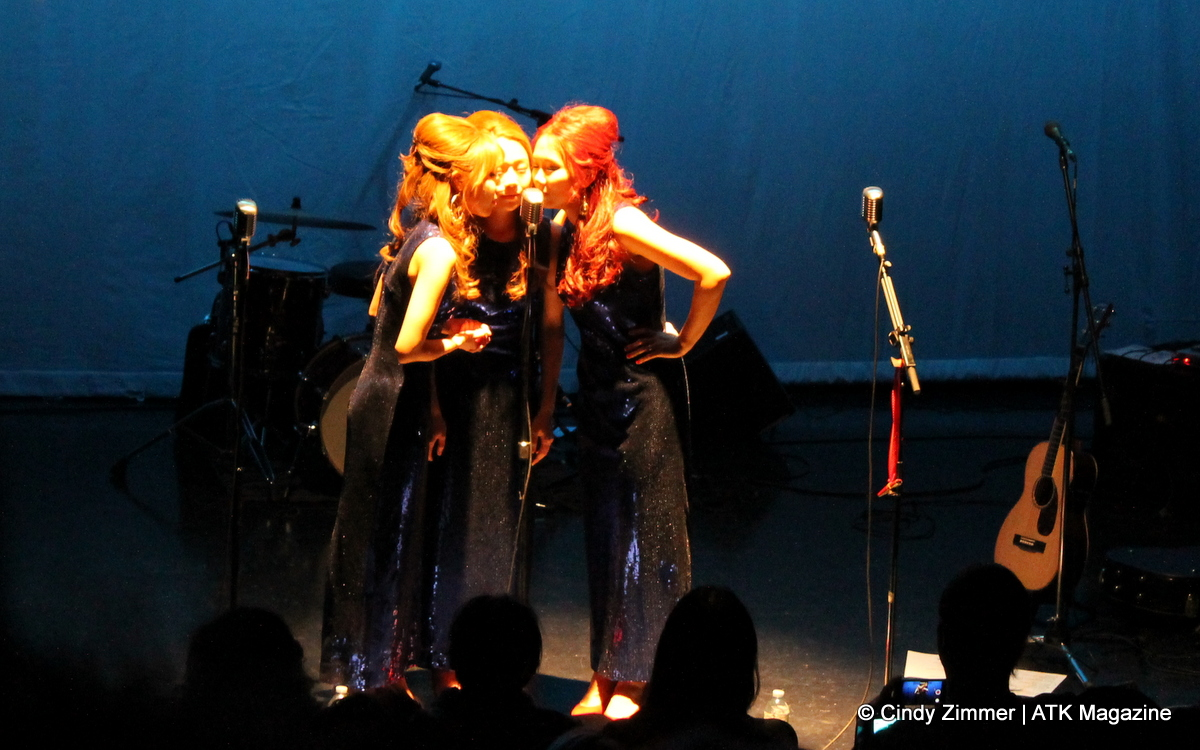
So Hee Park, Grace Kim, Shinae An Wheeler, March 2015, Toronto Centre for the Arts

They described their music as "Korean doo-wop done in the 21st century". They were inspired by doo-wop, Motown, barbershop, and pop music that was created prior to the 1960s, and also by groups like The Andrews Sisters, The Chordettes, and The Ronettes, to whom they have been compared.

They gave credit to the 1960s Korean girl group Korean Kittens, and especially The Kim Sisters, whom they discovered on YouTube, as having a large effect on them, and call them their "biggest idols". They said they were stunned by the performances of the Kim Sisters, who did not receive a lot of recognition in Korea until recently, but were signed with Motown, and performed on The Ed Sullivan Show many times.

Because of the group's performances in indie venues they are often referred to as an indie pop group. Their musical style has been described as "giving a glimpse into what K-pop might have been like in the 1950s with their styling and song choice".

== Members ==
=== Original three ===
Shinae An Wheeler, the group's creator, producer, leader, guitarist, main composer and writer was born July 30, 1986, in Seongnam. She graduated from the Seoul Institute of the Arts and started her professional music career at age fifteen as a backing vocalist for some of the S.M. Entertainment artists, including BoA and Fly to the Sky, and as a lyricist, including "Romance" on BoA's Hurricane Venus. She is listed as a vocal participant on 110 released records registered in the Federation of Korean Music Performers (FKMP), since 2002; and started vocal training in 2006. Between 2009 and 2012, she was a radio panelist, introducing Korean indie bands, on English language program "K-popular" on TBSeFM. She teaches at Kwangwoon Conservatory of Music and has taught free music classes and worked with charities for disadvantaged teenagers in Seoul. As one of the group's vocalists, she trades out vocal harmonies with the other two members, sometimes singing lead.

Grace (Eun Hye, in Korean) Kim, was born on April 11, 1987, in Seoul. She trained on classical piano, violin and flute, and from 2011 to 2014 studied at Chung-Ang University. She was active in the indie-jazz scene as a lead vocalist in a 12-piece Korean jazz band called JHG (Just Hip'n Groovy), whose band leader was Jung Jung Hwa, a professor of Seoul Institute of the Arts. She was the group's vocalist, usually singing the higher notes in the harmonies, and said of herself, "I am the playful one with a big smile."

So Hee Park was born on April 10, 1991, in Suwon She played piano since a very young age and started studying modern contemporary music in 2011 at Sungshin Women's University. She usually sang the low harmony, except when singing the lead, as on the group's single release, their cover of Be My Baby. She practices Yoga, and as the youngest of the group, called herself the "baby Barberette."

The group's instrumentalists are Sae Ha Lee (piano), Hyun Park (bass), and B. A. Wheeler (drums, sound engineer and co-producer who replaced the original drummer, Ji Yong Kim).

=== Member changes ===
In early November 2015, member Grace Kim left the group and was replaced by Seon or (Sunnie) Lee, a backup vocalist of musical groups, including Brown Eyed Soul, Dynamic Duo, and Lena Park.

On March 29, 2018, the three members announced on their YouTube channel that So Hee Park would be leaving the group.

== Career ==
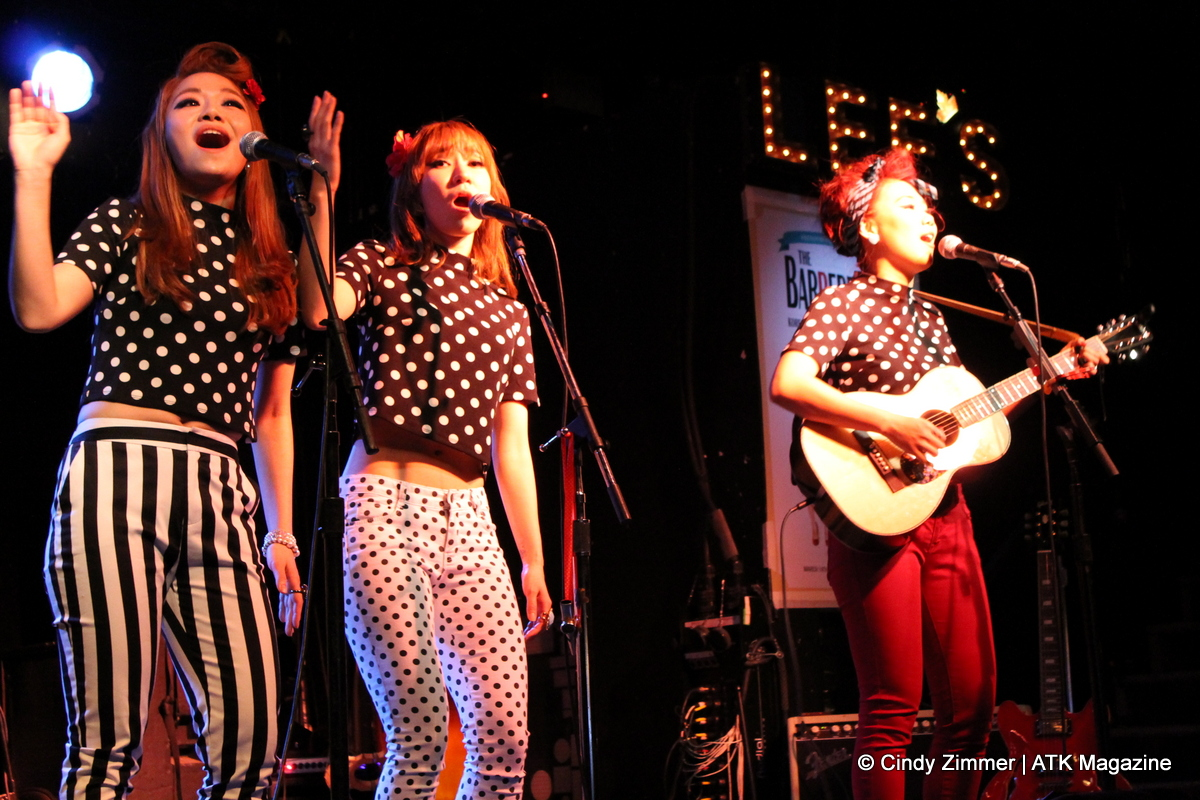
Grace Kim, Sohee Park, Shinae An Wheeler, March 2015, Lee's Palace, Toronto

=== 2014: The Barberettes Volume 1, The Barberettes Carol: Hun Hun Christmas ===
On January 29, "Sweet Lies", their first OST, on the album soundtrack for the Korean drama Prime Minister and I, was released.

On May 27, they released their first album The Barberettes Volume 1. Their work was nominated for three 2015 Korean Music Awards, "Rookie of the Year","Best Pop Album", and the first track "Little Gals", for "Best Pop Song".

In October, at the Seoul International Music Fair or MU:CON SEOUL 2014, they were one of five groups selected for an invitation to perform at the 2015 SXSW Music Festival in Austin Texas

On December 4, The Barberettes Carol: Hun Hun Christmas was released.

By the end of the year, the group had performed a number of Korean concerts, and been musical guests on several radio and television appearances, including shows on KBS2, You Hee-yeol's Sketchbook; and live performances in Japan, and on Japanese radio with Marty Friedman. At a tribute concert for Han Dae-soo, he admitted he is a fan and supporter. And they have also been featured on works of other artists, including Yang Hee Eun.

=== 2015: "Be My Baby", SXSW, Toronto, London and Melbourne performances ===
On January 16, they released a cover of Be My Baby of The Ronettes, which charted at number 38 on the Gaon Music Chart and received attention when it was used by Shinhan Card for a commercial, also in January. Prior to the release of the cover, it received over 5 million views to win an online video contest, at the site "vube.com".

In March, at their three appearances at the SXSW festival, a showcase at the Austin Convention Center on March 17 (where they performed in traditional hanbok), at K-Pop Night Out at SXSW on March 19, and at the closing for SXSW on March 22, they received media recognition as the best of SXSW bands to hear and see, and placed on four "best" lists, NPR's All Songs Considered, two women's magazines, Marie Claire, and Bitch, and a newspaper, the San Jose Mercury News. The Austin Chronicle wrote, "The Barberettes are what would've happened if the Brill Building had been built in Seoul".

They combined their western trip with concerts in Toronto Canada, performing on March 14, at the Toronto Centre for the Arts and on March 15 at Lee's Palace. On March 27, they performed at the 5th Hong Kong Asian-Pop Music Festival (HKAMF 2015) at the Hong Kong Convention and Exhibition Centre in Hong Kong where they placed second in the "Asian Super Nova Award", a competition among eight new artists.

In April, they were selected by KOCCA as one of twelve musical teams, artists of various genres, to "introduce talented, passionate, young Korean musicians to overseas audiences," and performed at the K-Pop Night Out concert at Midem on June 6.

On August 13, the group performed at the opening ceremony of the Jecheon International Music & Film Festival with Mia Kim of The Kim Sisters and her husband Tommy Vig. The Kim Sisters' commemorative documentary, "Try to Remember", by Director Kim Dae-hyun opened the festival. In celebration of the event, the group also held a "Kim Sisters Tribute Concert" on August 16, in Hongdae.

On September 4, they performed in London for the K-Music Festival 2015, two nights at the venue The Forge in Camden; on radio BBC London 94.9's Jo Good show and on TV, The One Show.

On November 24, they released their second Christmas mini-album, Lonesome Christmas, with new member Kyeong joining Wheeler and Park.

On December 2, they performed at the "Mapping Melbourne" showcase in Australia and on radio stations.

=== 2016: "Time 2 Love", "Love Shoes" and The Barberettes ===
In March, they were announced as part of the line-up of the Korean Music Festival to be held on May 7, and added it to part of their North American Tour 2016, including May 10 at the American Beauty NYC, May 13–14 at the Toronto Centre for the Arts, and May 15 at The Casbah in Hamilton, Ontario.

Also, in March, they were again selected as one of the musical groups to act as hallyu representatives by KOCCA, and performed at The Great Escape Festival in Brighton and Hove, England which took place on May 19–21.

On June 23, they released a single "Time 2 Love" which featured Marty Friedman, former lead guitarist of heavy metal band Megadeth, who became a fan of theirs when they released their first album.

On September 26, they released a single "Love Shoes", featuring Stuart Zender, former bass guitarist of British funk and acid jazz band Jamiroquai, who they met while performing at The Great Escape Festival.

On October 19, they released their second studio album, The Barberettes, which included the singles released earlier with Friedman and Zender. Friedman, also, joined them in their Seongdong-gu studio in August to help produce the album, playing guitar and composing some of the songs. Member Park said their debut album had just included songs they could do their best on, but on the second one, they had expanded to a wider range of music genres.

On December 3, they performed at the Rencontres Trans Musicales in Rennes, France.

== Discography ==
=== Studio albums ===
Title	Album details	Peak chart positions	Sales
Title	Album details	KOR	Sales
The Barberettes Volume No. 1 (바버렛츠 소곡집 #1)	Released: May 27, 2014; Label: Egg Group, NHN Entertainment Corporation; Formats: CD, digital download; Track listing: 1. "Little Gals (가시내들)"; 2. "Kukerichoo (쿠커리츄)" (Korean); 3. "Summer Night Wind (한 여름밤에 부는 바람)"; 4. "Summer Night Dream (한 여름밤의 꿈)"; 5. "Spring's Greeting (봄맞이)"; 6. "When It's Rainin' (비가 오거든)"; 7. "Thoughts In Love (사랑의 마음)"; 8. "Mrs. Lonely"; 9. "Kukerichoo" (English)	58	—N/a
The Barberettes	Released: October 19, 2016; Label: EggPlant, NHN Entertainment Corporation; Formats: CD, digital download; Track listing: 1. "Like I Do"; 2. "Love Shoes" (featuring Stuart Zender); 3. "Dyin' In Love (품절남)"; 4. "Fisherman (피셔맨)"; 5. "Fairy Tale"; 6. "Gentleman (멋쟁이 신사)"; 7. "I Don't Mind (신경쓰지마)"; 8. "If You Love Me (사랑한다면)"; 9. "I'll Be Your Friend"; 10. "Sailor (바다 아저씨)" (featuring Echae Kang); 11. "Time 2 Love" (featuring Marty Friedman)	57	—N/a
The Barberettes: Seasons (바버렛츠의 사계절)	Released: January 16, 2018; Label: EggPlant, NHN Entertainment Corporation; Formats: CD, digital download; Track listing: 1. "Spring, Bear (봄, 곰)"; 2. "Squishy Squishy (말랑말랑)"; 3. "Mr. Sandman"; 4. "Spring In My Hometown (고향의 봄)"; 5. "Summer Love" (Korean); 6. "Shoo"; 7. "Fall Is Coming (가을이 오네)"; 8. "Next To You" (English); 9. "The Water Is Wide"; 10. "White Blanket (하얀이불)" (featuring Gilgu Bonggu); 11. "Santa Claus Is Coming To Town (울면 어때)"; 12. "The First Noel + Oh Holy Night"; 13. "My Winter Wonderland"; 14. "All I Want Is You (바버렛츠의 사계절)"; 15. "Summer Love" (English) (Bonus Track); 16. "Next To You" (Korean)	63	—N/a

=== Extended plays ===
Title	Album details	Peak chart positions	Sales
Title	Album details	KOR	Sales
The Barberettes Carol: Hun Hun Christmas (바버렛츠 캐롤 : 훈훈 크리스마스)	Released: December 4, 2014; Label: EggPlant, NHN Entertainment Corporation; Formats: CD, digital download; Track listing: 1. "Jingle Bells (징글벨)"; 2. "Hun Hun Christmas (가시내들)"; 3. "White Christmas (쿠커리츄)"; 4. "Winter Wonderland (겨울나기)"	45	KOR: 630
The Barberettes: Spring (바버렛츠의 봄)	Released: April 13, 2015; Label: EggPlant, NHN Entertainment Corporation; Formats: CD, digital download; Track listing: 1. "Spring, Bear (봄, 곰)"; 2. "Squishy Squishy (말랑말랑)"; 3. "Mr. Sandman"; 4. "Hometown (고향의 봄)"	—	—N/a
The Barberettes: Autumn (바버렛츠의 가을)	Released: October 19, 2017; Label: EggPlant, NHN Entertainment Corporation; Formats: CD, digital download; Track listing: 1. "Fall is Coming (가을이 오네)"; 2. "Next to You"; 3. "The Water is Wide"; 4. "Next to You" (English)	—	—N/a
The Barberettes: Winter (바버렛츠의 겨울)	Released: December 1, 2017; Label: EggPlant, NHN Entertainment Corporation; Formats: CD, digital download; Track listing: 1. "White Blanket (하얀이불)" (featuring Gilgu Bonggu); 2. "It's Okay, You Can Cry (Santa Claus is Coming to Town) (울면 어때)"; 3. "The First Noel + Oh Holy Night"; 4. "My Winter Wonderland"; 5. "All I Want is You (바버렛츠의 사계절)"	—	—N/a

=== Single albums ===
Title	Album details	Peak chart positions	Sales
Title	Album details	KOR	Sales
Lonesome Christmas	Released: November 24, 2015; Label: EggPlant, NHN Entertainment Corporation; Formats: digital download; Track listing: 1. "Lonesome Christmas (론썸 크리스마스)" (Korean); 2. "Santa Baby"; 3. "Lonesome Christmas" (English)	—	—N/a
The Barberettes: Summer (바버렛츠의 여름)	Released: July 5, 2017; Label: EggPlant, NHN Entertainment Corporation; Formats: digital download; Track listing: 1. "Summer Love" (Korean); 2. "Shoo"; 3. "Summer Love" (English)	—	—N/a
Santa Is Busy	Released: November 27, 2018; Label: EggPlant, NHN Entertainment Corporation; Formats: digital download; Track listing: 1. "Winter Wind (겨울바람)"; 2. "Santa Is Busy" (featuring Kang Seung Won)	—	—N/a

=== Singles ===
==== As lead artist ====
Title	Year	Peak chart positions	Album
Title	Year	KOR	Album
"Be My Baby"	2015	—	Non-album single
"Lonesome Christmas" (론썸 크리스마스)	2015	—	Lonesome Christmas
"Time 2 Love" feat. Marty Friedman	2016	—	The Barberettes
"Love Shoes" feat. Stuart Zender	2016	—	The Barberettes
"Shoo"	2017	—	The Barberettes: Summer
"Winter Wind" (겨울바람)	2018	—	Santa Is Busy
"Have You Seen The Blue Sky?" (파란 하늘을 보았니?)	2019	—	Wild Forest Exhale Vol.10
"Forgotten Love" (잊혀진 사랑) with Kingston Rudieska	2019	—	Respect Legend 4th
"—" denotes releases that did not chart.

==== As featured artist ====
Title	Year	Peak chart positions	Sales (DL)	Album
Title	Year	KOR	Sales (DL)	Album
"Sweet Lies" (달콤한 빈말) Baek A-yeon feat. The Barberettes	2017	5	KOR: 275,901	Bittersweet

==== Collaborations ====
Year	Title	Album
2017	"Stranger's Love" with Jang Jin-young	SM Station
2018	"Outside The Chart" with Sunwoo Jung-a	Non-album single

==== Soundtrack appearances ====
Year	Title	Album
2014	"Sweet Lies" (다정한 거짓말)	Prime Minister and I OST
2017	"It's Magical" feat. Ha Rim	Strongest Deliveryman OST
2017	"Beauty Queen"	Live Up to Your Name OST
2019	"What a Meaning" (어떤 의미)	Possessed OST
2019	"Perfume of Love" (퍼퓸)	Perfume OST

== Concerts and tours ==
=== 2014 ===
- The Barberettes Recital, solo
- MU:CON SEOUL 2014
- 7th Annual Korea-America Friendship Holiday Concert

=== 2015 ===
- The Barberettes in Toronto, solo, Toronto Centre for the Arts
- The Barberettes in Toronto, solo, Lee's Palace
- K-Pop Night Out at SXSW, Austin, Texas
- The 5th Hong Kong Asian-Pop Music Festival (HKAMF 2015)
- Han Dae-soo Tribute Concert "Reverse, Rebirth"
- K-Pop Night Out At Midem, Cannes
- Jecheon International Music & Film Festival opening ceremony
- K-Music Festival 2015, London
- Mapping Melbourne

=== 2016 ===
- Korean Music Festival, Los Angeles
- North American Tour 2016, New York City, Toronto
- The Great Escape Festival, Brighton and Hove, England
- Zandari Festa, Seoul
- Rencontres Trans Musicales, Rennes, France

== Awards and nominations ==
=== Korean Music Awards ===
Year	Nominee / work	Award	Result
2015	The Barberettes Volume. 1	Best Pop Album	Nominated
2015	"Little Gals"	Best Pop Song	Nominated
2015	The Barberettes	Rookie of the Year	Nominated
