= Apricotine =

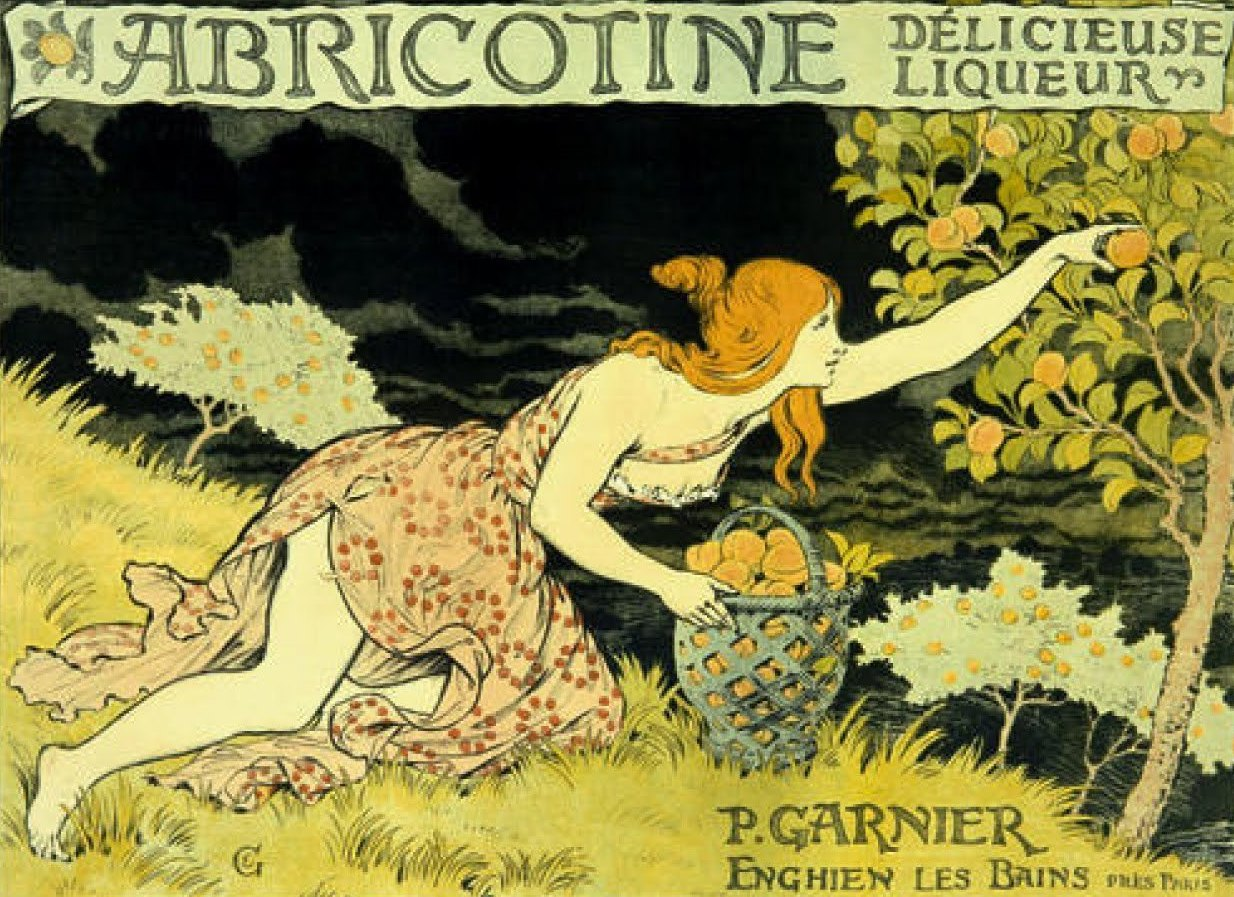
Abricotine, liqueur

Apricotine may refer to:

- A French brand of apricot brandy, also known as Crème d'Abricot
- A variety of quartz; see List of minerals (synonyms)

== See also ==
- Apricot (disambiguation)
