= Moodswings in This Order =

EP by DPR Ian
- Released: March 12, 2021
- Genre: Alternative R&B, pop, rock, electronica
- Length: 23:11
- Label: Dream Perfect Regime

DPR Ian chronology
Moodswings in This Order (2021)	Moodswings in to Order (2022)

Singles from Moodswings in This Order
- 1. "So Beautiful" Released: October 26, 2020; 2. "No Blueberries" Released: December 18, 2020

Moodswings in This Order is the debut extended play of Australian singer DPR Ian. It was released on March 12, 2021 through Dream Perfect Regime. It was nominated for R&B Album of the Year at the Korean Hip-hop Awards and peaked at number 40 on the Circle Album Chart.

== Background ==
In an interview with Billboard, DPR Ian explained the inspiration behind the EP.

"Overall, I wanted to portray a character dealing with various mental disorders which may be deemed negative or dark in a realistic sense but at the same time can also be seen as superpowers in a different light. It’s also a reflection of a lot of who I am as a person — being someone that deals with such ‘mental disorders,’ I wanted to remove that stigma and just put an artistic twist to it, because at the end of the day, it’s really all about expression for me."

== Music and lyrics ==
According to Asian Junkie, "DPR Ian takes the listener on his journey through the darkness, despair, loneliness, regrets, fears, and eventually acceptance of who he is now." "So Beautiful" is a "combination of R&B, jazz, and an empty chorus which is somehow able to blend with Ian’s chilling vocals." “No Blueberries” expresses "the facade we give to our anxieties and obsessions through jazzy piano riffs and soft percussion that contrast with the darkness of the lyrics."

This album ties into a larger universe built by DPR Ian which involves his other albums Moodswings in to Order and Dear Insanity, where its representative of its various episodes from his bipolar disorder, with characters such as MITO and Mr. Insanity. In an interview with Rolling Stone from July 22, 2022, DPR Ian says,

"In this universe, there’s a core character called Mr. Insanity (who has a dedicated album track) and he’s just wackadoodle, you know? He’s literally going insane, but it’s funny because I think insanity brings order. He made all the forms and the stories — which include the ones on my last EP — in the image of himself, in the hope of finding some sanity. His first creation was MITO, who was meant to represent his pure innocence, which is why he was in the form of an angel. MITO was jealous of all the other creations, and felt he was the only one who deserved love. Mr. Insanity saw that darkness and banished him, so MITO felt betrayed and resented everything that Mr. Insanity was — and vowed to infest his every creation. He wants to be the main character."

Moodswings in This Order represents what brightness means to him, almost like a perfect story of happiness and content. In the same interview, he says,

“What MITO represents is that my good moments are always destroyed by my doubts,” he says. “So it’s a journey of trying to find that perfect story or moment, like an idea or concept or understanding of myself, and not let it be so infiltrated by my downs/MITO.”

== Critical reception ==
Sofiana Ramli of NME rated the EP 4 out of 5 stars. According to her, it is a "well thought out concept that isn’t too overly ambitious." She concluded that "DPR Ian is carving out a space for himself in the R&B world, and the mark that he’s about to leave on the scene won’t make him go unnoticed."

=== Year-end lists ===
Publication	List	Ref.
Asian Junkie	Top 10 Korean Albums of 2021	
Bandwagon Asia	Best EPs of 2021	

== Awards and nominations ==
Award	Year	Category	Result	Ref.
Korean Hip-hop Awards	2022	R&B Album of the Year	Nominated	

== Track listing ==
All tracks are written by DPR Ian.

No.	Title	Lyrics	Music	Length
1.	"MITO"			1:39
2.	"So Beautiful"			3:07
3.	"Dope Lovers"			3:20
4.	"No Blueberries" (featuring DPR Live, CL)	DPR Live		3:05
5.	"Nerves"			3:15
6.	"Scaredy Cat"			2:50
7.	"Welcome to the Show"		Ampoff, Yoo Ha-rim	3:25
8.	"No Silhouette"			2:29
Total length:				23:11

== Charts ==
Chart (2021)	Peak position
South Korean Albums (Circle)	40
