= Moodswings in to Order =

Studio album by DPR Ian
- Released: July 29, 2022
- Genre: Pop, disco, hip hop, alternative R&B, rock
- Length: 37:08
- Label: DPR
- Producer: DPR IAN

DPR Ian chronology
Moodswings in This Order (2021)	Moodswings in to Order (2022)	Dear Insanity... (2023)

Moodswings in to Order is the debut studio album of Korean-Australian singer DPR Ian. It was released on July 29, 2022 through Dream Perfect Regime.

== Theme ==
Moodswings in to Order is a continuation of the "Mito" character that appeared on Moodswings in This Order. and serves as an unprecedented glimpse into Mr. Insanity's character. Mito is Mr. Insanity's "first and purest creation — perhaps even the closest replica of him". He "craves" Mr. Insanity's love to a possessive degree, to the point where sharing his affection is an insult. His greed, however, gets him cast out of Mr. Insanity's world and into despair."

== Music and lyrics ==
"Seraph" is a "beautiful string piece mixed with synths". It depicts Mito "remembering the very last conversation that he had with this God before he decided to change and resent him." "1 Shot", "Mood", and "Ballroom Extravaganza" are "romantic, sonically textural songs" similar to those of The Weeknd and Frank Ocean that frame DPR Ian's "warm croon in shimmering synths, vibrant grooves, and supernatural instrumental accents." "Merry Go" describes Ian and Mito's relationship that keeps coming back to the same position. "Ribbon" features funky bass and clavinet sounds while "Mr. Insanity" is a modern take on 1980's synth-pop.

== Critical reception ==
Professional ratings
Review scores
Source	Rating
AllMusic	4/5 stars
IZM	3.5/5 stars

Matt Collar of AllMusic rated the album 4 out of 5 stars. He wrote that "building upon the hypnotic blend of pop, R&B, and dance music that was 2021's Moodswings in This Order, DPR Ian continues to hone his sound with his first full-length" album.

Yeom Dong-gyo of IZM rated the album 3.5 out of 5 stars. According to him, DPR Ian "completed a concept album that features charming songs along with visual elements and solid storylines".

Xiao Qing of Seoulbeats wrote that the album is "poetic and conceptually strong, but unfortunately some of the tracks fall flat as he continues to further develop his style and sound as a soloist."

=== Year-end list ===
Publication	List	Ref.
Bandwagon Asia	Top Albums of 2022	
Bollywood Hungama	10 Best Korean Albums of 2022	

== Track listing ==
All tracks are written by DPR Ian.

No.	Title	Length
1.	"Seraph"	2:26
2.	"1 Shot"	2:24
3.	"Mood"	3:02
4.	"Miss Understood"	3:20
5.	"Avalon"	3:15
6.	"Merry Go"	3:10
7.	"Ribbon"	3:35
8.	"Winterfall"	3:36
9.	"Calico"	3:42
10.	"Mr. Insanity"	2:47
11.	"Ballroom Extravaganza"	3:09
12.	"Sometimes I'm"	2:37
Total length:		37:08

== Charts ==
Chart (2022)	Peak position
South Korean Albums (Circle)	30
US Billboard 200	146

== Sales ==
Region	Sales
South Korea	3,000
