= Apricot (disambiguation) =

Apricot is a fruit from several tree species in family Rosaceae, and the trees that bear them.

Apricot may also refer to:

- Prunus armeniaca, most commonly cultivated apricot species
- Prunus brigantina, Briançon apricot
- Prunus fremontii, Desert apricot
- Pittosporum angustifolium, Australian native tree
- Tropical apricot, several plants
- Apricot (color)
- APRICOT (conference)
- Apricot Computers
  - ACT Computer Apricot

== See also ==
- Project Apricot (disambiguation)
- 4pricøt, 2022 album by Cotoba
