= C-Clown =

South Korean boyband

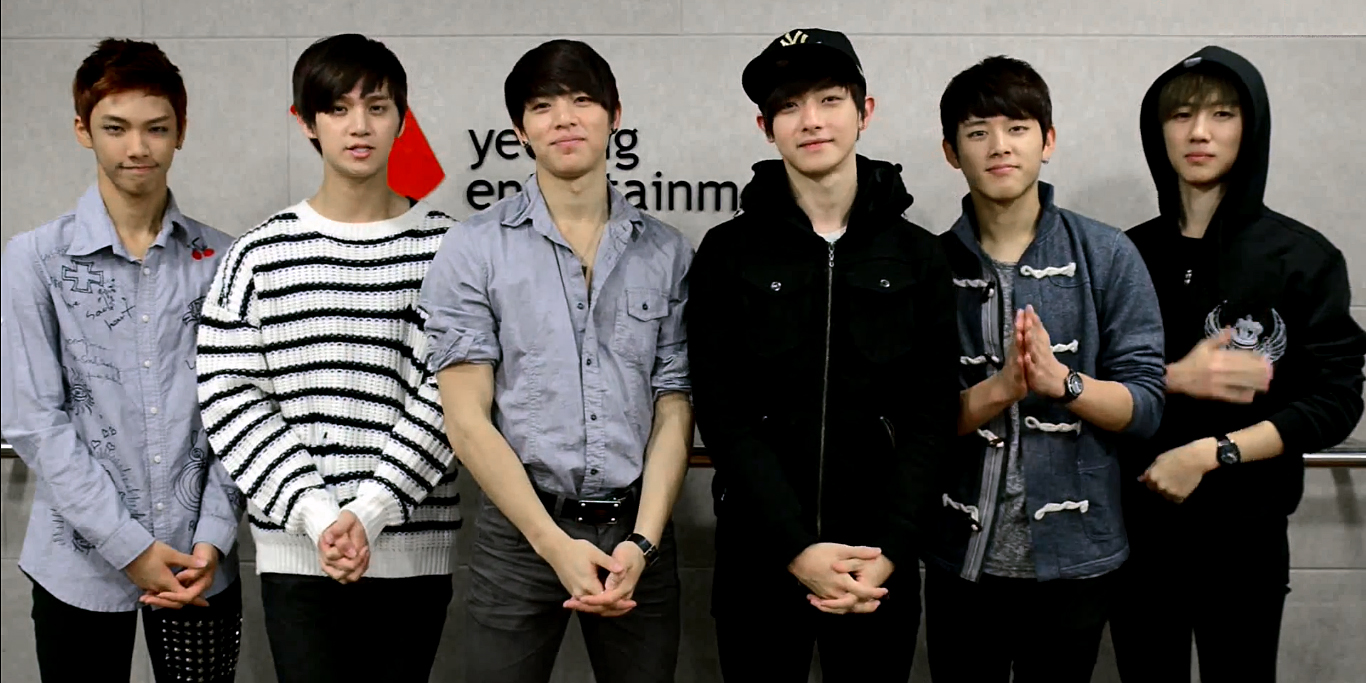
- C-Clown in 2012

Background information
- Origin: Seoul, South Korea
- Genre: K-pop
- Years active: 2012–2015
- Labels: Yedang; LOEN; Sony Korea
- Past members: Siwoo; Ray; Kang Jun; T.K; Maru; Rome
- Website: cafe.daum.net/C-CLOWN

C-Clown (Korean: 씨클라운; short for Crown Clown) was a South Korean boy band under Yedang Entertainment. It had six members: Rome, Siwoo, Ray, Kang Jun, T.K, and Maru. They disbanded on October 5, 2015 after being together for three years.

== History ==
Prior to his debut in C-Clown, T.K. filmed a television ad for Pepero in 2009. T.K. was also a trainee under Cube Entertainment; he was in the original lineup for the group BtoB and filmed alongside them in the sitcom I Live in Cheongdam-dong, but was pulled out of the group due to a medical condition. Another member, Rome, was a participant on Let's Go! Dream Team Season 2 for two episodes that featured newcomers/returnees to the entertainment scene.

=== 2012-2013: Not Alone, Young Love and Shaking Heart ===
C-Clown released their debut mini-album Not Alone with its lead single being "Solo" on July 18, 2012. They made their debut performance following day on the Mnet music television program M Countdown. On November 15 of the same year, they released their second mini-album Young Love. Rado, Kim Tae-ju, and Beast's Yong Jun-hyung participated in the album's production.

C-Clown released their third mini-album Shaking Heart with the lead single bearing the same name. In this album the group showed different music genres than was used in previous albums. Beast's Yong Jun-hyung participated in the album's production again on song "Do You Remember" collaborated by ALi originally released at April 2, 2013 as a digital single.

=== 2014–2015: Let's Love and disbandment ===
C-Clown pre-released their track "Tell Me" a few weeks before their official comeback single. They eventually released their single "Justice" in February, showcasing a new style. On July 7, 2014, C-Clown made another comeback, releasing the MV to their title track, "Let's Love".

In April 2015, Rome changed his Instagram username to @christianyu_ and deleted all of his pictures. The new account had the description, "they turned me into something that I am not. Never forget what I did for u", he later shortened this to "never...forget...". These actions raised the speculation that the group was disbanding or he was at least leaving the group, but everything remained obscure. On August 13, 2015, Rome returned to Instagram and wrote another post that raised further questions about the future of the group.

On October 4, 2015, Yedang announced the disbandment. The official SNS channels (excluding YouTube), including the official C-CLOWN fan cafe, will have a grace period of a month from October 5, and become private. Rome confirmed this through several tweets on his Twitter. Yedang Entertainment said the 6th member of the group will remain under their agency, other members will work as producers under the agency while the others are preparing to form a new group.

== Members ==
- Rome (롬)
- Siwoo (시우)
- Ray (레이)
- Kang Jun (강준)
- T.K.
- Maru (마루)

== Discography ==
=== Extended plays ===
Title	Album details	Peak chart positions	Sales
Title	Album details	KOR	Sales
Not Alone	Released: July 19, 2012; Label: Yedang Entertainment; Format: CD, digital download	14	KOR: 2,592
Young Love	Released: November 15, 2012; Label: Yedang Entertainment; Format: CD, digital download	15	KOR: 4,140
Shaking Heart (흔들리고 있어; Heundeulligo Isseo)	Released: April 18, 2013; Label: Yedang Entertainment; Format: CD, digital download	1	KOR: 5,323
Let's Love (나랑만나; Narang Manna)	Released: July 8, 2014; Label: Yedang Entertainment; Format: CD, digital download	9	KOR: 4,996

=== Singles ===
Title	Year	Peak chart positions		Sales	Album
Title	Year	KOR (Note: Additional reference for weekly peak positions: "Justice".)	KOR Hot (Note: References for weekly peak positions: "Far Away... Young Love", "Shaking Heart".)	Sales	Album
"Solo"	2012	82	—		Not Alone
"Far Away... Young Love" (멀어질까봐; Meoreojilkkabwa)	2012	7	75		Young Love
"Shaking Heart" (흔들리고 있어; Heundeulligo Isseo)	2013	37	45	KOR: 95,673	Shaking Heart
"Tell Me" (말해줘; Malhaejwo)	2014	76	—		Non-album single
"Justice" (암행어사; Amhaengeosa)	2014	163	—		Let's Love
"Let's Love" (나랑만나; Narang Manna)	2014	—	—		Let's Love
"—" denotes releases that did not chart or were not released in that region.
