= 4pricøt =

Studio album by Cotoba
- Released: April 29, 2022
- Genre: Math rock
- Length: 53:49
- Label: Mirrorball Music

Cotoba chronology
Since the World Is About to End (2021)	4pricøt (2022)

4pricøt (pronounced Apricot) is the debut studio album by South Korean math rock band Cotoba. The album was released on 29 April 2022.

== Background ==
Prior to its release the album, there was a member change in Cotoba: Marker and Euphemia left the band, and new members Sei and Minsuh joined the band. They interviewed Newsis about the album's name. "Cotoba appeared as a hard seed and sprouted, learning the language of the world, interacting with each other, and stretching out her stems. Thankfully, we received love and attention, and we were able to blossom because of it. The new album is like a fruit that bears with the love received in the world. We thought the fruit was like an apricot. That's why we named it Apricot."

== Critical reception ==
Park Byeongwoon of Music Y reviewed the track Free Will (계산된 자유) of the album as "Like their math rock music, which has shown that the conflicting concepts of anomalies and rules are compatible in music, this time, the concept of calculation and freedom is realised through a flexible method of connection rather than confrontation." Xenith of Tonplein reviewed "Whether they can reach everyone listening to their music remains to be seen, but the traces of them they have stepped on over the years remain all too evident in the 4pricøt It would be a great experience to follow this."

== Track listing ==
No.	Title	Length
1.	"Free Will" ("계산된 자유")	4:56
2.	"Kyrie"	2:59
3.	"Melon"	5:01
4.	"Frittata"	4:57
5.	"Things We Looking for Instrumental" ("찾고 있는 것은")	5:51
6.	"Warm Salad"	4:08
7.	"Love&Art"	6:30
8.	"Loss"	5:06
9.	"Disparition" ("소멸의 소실")	4:47
10.	"Reyn"	4:37
11.	"Rescapé" ("살아남은")	4:57
