= DPR Live =

South Korean rapper (born 1993)

DPR Live 홍다빈
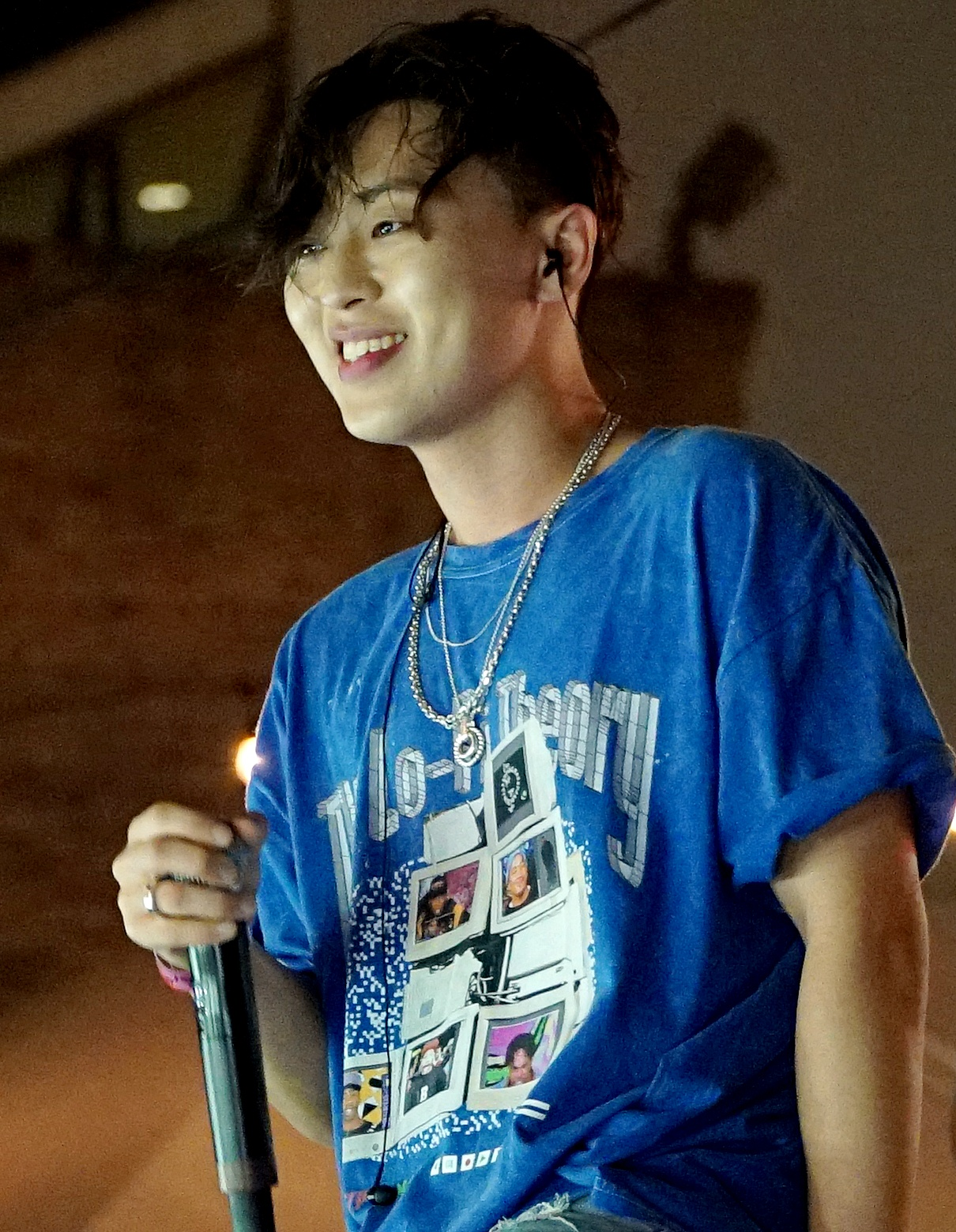
- At Korea Spotlight 2018, Austin, Texas.

Background information
- Born: Hong Da-bin; January 1, 1993 (age 33); Seoul, South Korea
- Genre: Hip hop
- Occupations: Rapper; singer
- Instrument: Vocals
- Years active: 2015–present
- Label: Dream Perfect Regime (DPR)
- Website: dreamperfectregime.com

- Korean name
- Hangul: 홍다빈
- RR: Hong Dabin
- MR: Hong Tabin

Hong Da-bin (Korean: 홍다빈; born January 1, 1993), better known by his stage name DPR Live (디피알 라이브), is a South Korean rapper and singer. Along with Ian, Cream, and artic, Hong co-founded the label Dream Perfect Regime—all of whom attach the label's acronym "DPR" to their names. He released his debut EP, Coming to You Live, on March 15, 2017. He then released his second EP Her on December 7, 2017, followed by his debut studio album Is Anybody Out There? on March 3, 2020. His third EP Iite Cool was released on July 23, 2021.

== Personal life ==
Hong Da-bin was born in Seoul on January 1, 1993, and was raised in Guam. According to his song “To Whoever” he left Guam for Korea in February 2007. He planned to pursue his higher education in psychology and philosophy in college before considering music but his perspective changed after he attended his mandatory military service in South Korea, where "he found inspiration to go after his dream." He began writing during that period of time and continued to do so, which led him to grow "into a natural passion for music". In late 2023, he changed his stage name into "Dabin", his full name, and released his first album under this name "Giggles" on 23 January, 2024. Even after the name change, he produced this album under DPR label and is still a member of it.

== Discography ==
=== Studio albums ===
Title	Album details	Peak chart positions	Sales
Title	Album details	KOR	Sales
Is Anybody Out There?	Released: March 3, 2020; Label: Dream Perfect Regime, Kakao M; Formats: CD, digital download	5	KOR: 9,976

=== Extended plays ===
Title	Album details	Peak chart positions		Sales
Title	Album details	KOR	US World	Sales
Coming to You Live	Released: March 15, 2017; Label: Dream Perfect Regime, Universal Music Korea; Formats: CD, digital download	31	14	KOR: 880
Her	Released: December 7, 2017; Label: Dream Perfect Regime, LOEN Entertainment; Formats: CD, digital download	24	8	KOR: 2,721
Iite Cool	Released: July 23, 2021; Label: Dream Perfect Regime, Kakao Entertainment; Formats: CD, digital download	4	—	KOR: 20,518

=== Singles ===
Title	Year	Peak chart positions	Sales (DL)	Album
Title	Year	KOR	Sales (DL)	Album
"Know Me" (featuring Dean)	2017	—	—N/a	Coming to You Live
"Please" (featuring Kim Hyo-eun, G2 and Dumbfoundead)	2017	—	—N/a	Coming to You Live
"Right Here Right Now" (featuring Loco and Jay Park)	2017	—	—N/a	Coming to You Live
"Laputa" (featuring Crush)	2017	—	—N/a	Coming to You Live
"Jasmine"	2017	189	KOR: 16,000	Her
"Martini Blue"	2017	— (Note: "Martini Blue" did not enter the Gaon Digital Chart top 200, but appeared at number 84 on the Download Chart.)	KOR: 17,661	Her
"Action!" (featuring Gray)	2018	87	—N/a	Action!
"Playlist"	2018	—	—N/a	Playlist
"Gravity"	2019	—	—N/a	Gravity
"Kiss Me"	2020	185	—N/a	Is Anybody Out There?
"Yellow Cab"	2021	— (Note: "Yellow Cab" did not enter the Gaon Digital Chart top 200, but appeared at number 135 on the Download Chart.)	—N/a	Iite Cool
"Hula Hoops" (featuring Beenzino and Hwasa)	2021	185	—N/a	Iite Cool
"Set It Off" (with League of Legends and featuring DPR Cline)	2022	—	—N/a	Non-album single
"—" denotes releases that did not chart.

== Music videos ==
Year	Title	Album	Director(s)
2015	"Till I Die"	Till I Die (single)	+IAN (Christian Yu)
2016	"Eung Freestyle" (응프리스타일) (feat. DPR Live, Sik-K, Punchnello, Owen Ovadoz, Flowsik)	Eung Freestyle (single)	DPR, KRSP, Lee Han Kyul
2016	"God Bless" (feat. Punchnello)	God Bless (single)	+IAN (Christian Yu)
2016	"갈증" (Thirst)	갈증 (Thirst) (single)	+IAN (Christian Yu)
2017	"Know Me" (feat. Dean)	Coming To You Live	+IAN (Christian Yu)
2017	"Please" (feat. 김효은, G2 & Dumbfoundead)	Coming To You Live	+IAN (Christian Yu)
2017	"Right Here Right Now" (feat. Loco & Jay Park)	Coming To You Live	+IAN (Christian Yu)
2017	"Laputa" (feat. Crush)	Coming To You Live	+IAN (Christian Yu)
2017	"Cheese & Wine"	Coming To You Live	+IAN (Christian Yu)
2017	"Jasmine" (prod by. Code Kunst)	Jasmine (single)	+IAN (Christian Yu)
2017	"Martini Blue"	Her (EP)	+IAN (Christian Yu)
2017	"Text Me"	Her (EP)	+IAN (Christian Yu)
2018	"Playlist"	Playlist (single)	+IAN (Christian Yu)
2020	"Legacy"	Is Anybody Out There?	+IAN (Christian Yu)
2020	"Kiss Me"/"Neon"	Is Anybody Out There?	+IAN (Christian Yu)
2021	"Yellow Cab"	Iite Cool (EP)	+IAN (Christian Yu)
2021	"Hula Hoops" (feat. Beenzino, Hwasa)	Iite Cool (EP)	
2021	"Diamonds + and Pearls" (feat. DPR Ian, Peace)	Shang-Chi and the Legend of the Ten Rings: The Album	

== Concert tours ==
- Coming To You Live Tour (2018)
- The Regime World Tour (2022)
