= Cotoba =

South Korean math rock band

- Origin: Seoul, South Korea
- Genres: Math rock
- Years active: 2018-present
- Labels: Friend of Mine Records; Mirror Ball Records
- Members: Dafne; Dyon Joo; Hyerim; Minsuh
- Past members: SEI; Djunana; Marker; Euphemia

cotoba (Korean: 코토바) is a South Korean math rock band. The band currently consists of Dafne (다프네), Dyon Joo (됸쥬, stylised in DyoN Joo), Hyerim (혜림), and Minsuh (민서). Since their formation in 2018, the band has released a studio album 4pricøt (2022).

== Career ==
Cotoba was formed in 2018. The band name is from the Japanese word kotoba (言葉, 'word, language'). In 2019, they released their first EP Form of Tongue (언어의 형태).

In February 2020, their videos on Naver Onstage gained popularity and were cast for Glastonbury Festival, but it was cancelled due to the COVID-19 pandemic. On 30 June, they released the EP Name of the Seasons (날씨의 이름), and the track Reyn was nominated for Best Rock Song at the 2021 Korean Music Awards. In 2021, they released the EP Since the World is About to End (세상은 곧 끝나니까), Park Soojin of IZM reviewed the album as "As if they were unravelling a grand narrative, they writes a song with concentration and finishes it with suction".

In 2022, Marker and Euphemia left the band, and new members Sei and Minsuh joined the band. They released their first studio album, 4pricøt, and appeared in the EBS Hello Rookie Contest. In 2023, they were named the Pentaport Rock Festival Super Rookie and had a performance.

== Discography ==
=== Studio albums ===
- 4pricøt (2022)

=== EPs ===
- Form of Tongue (언어의 형태) (2019)
- Name of the Seasons (날씨의 이름) (2020)
- Since the World is About to End (세상은 곧 끝나니까) (2021)
