= Lee Seung-yoon =

South Korean singer-songwriter (born 1989)

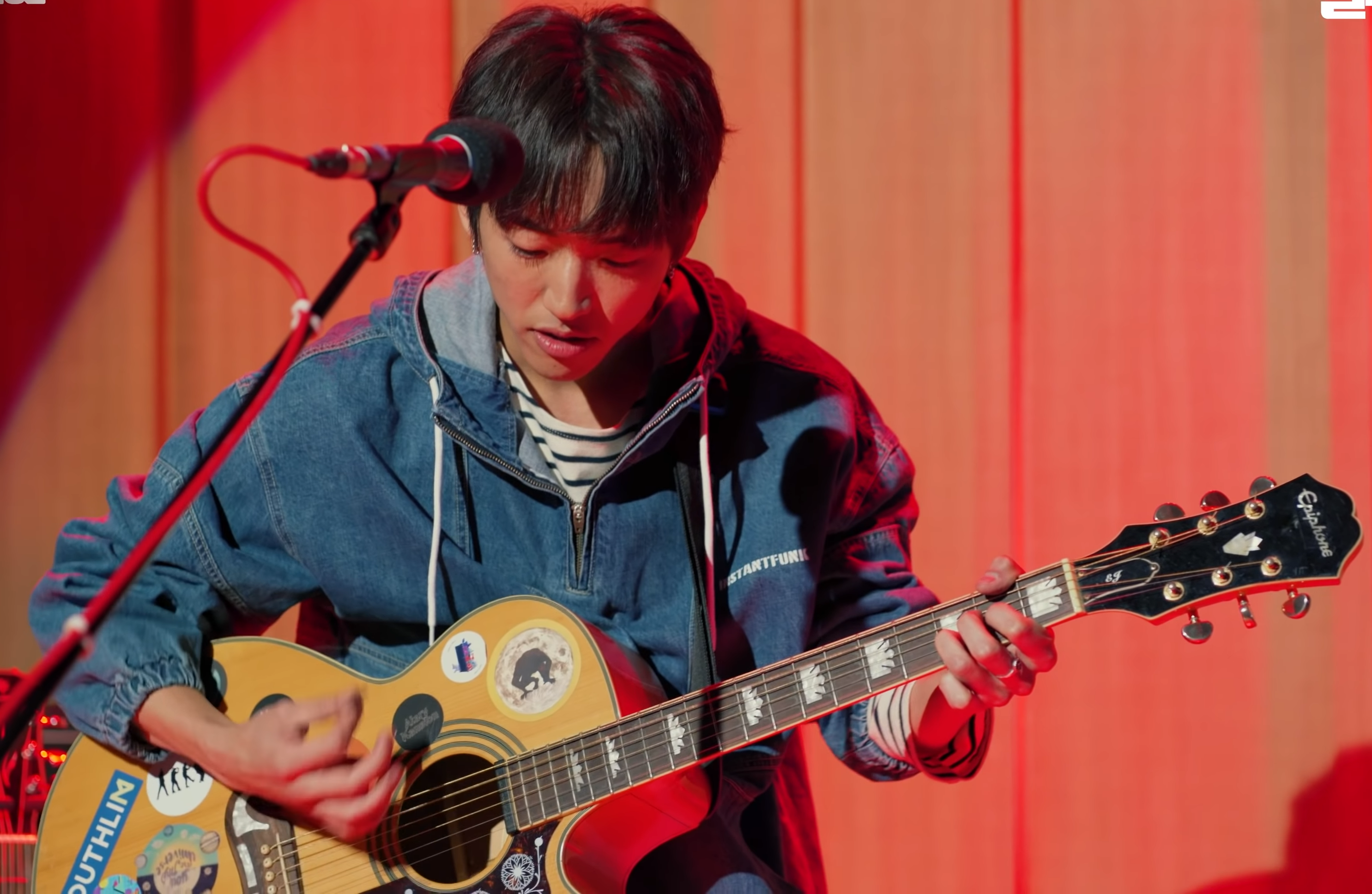
- Lee in 2021

Background information
- Born: August 21, 1989 (age 37)
- Origin: South Korea
- Occupation: Singer-songwriter
- Years active: 2013–present
- Label: Mareumo
- Formerly of: Dda Band; Alary-Kansion
- Spouse: Unknown (m. 2025)

Korean name
- Hangul: 이승윤
- RR: I Seungyun
- MR: I Sŭngyun

Lee Seung-yoon (Korean: 이승윤; born August 21, 1989) is a South Korean singer-songwriter. He first released music in 2012 as a member of the indie rock group Dda Band, before debuting as a soloist in 2013. From 2019 to 2021, he was the lead singer of rock band Alary-Kansion. However, he did not achieve mainstream popularity until 2021, when he placed first on the television competition show Sing Again.

Since appearing on Sing Again, Lee has released three full-length albums: Even If Things Fall Apart (2021), Shelter of Dreams (2022), and Yeok Seong (2024). He was ranked 34th and 29th, respectively, on the 2022 and 2023 Forbes Korea Power Celebrity 40.

== Early life and education ==
Lee was born in 1989. His father is Lee Jae-cheol (이재철), who was the senior pastor of Seoul's 100th Anniversary Memorial Church from 2005 to 2018. His mother is Jeong Ae-ju (정애주), the president of the book publishing company Hongsungsa. Lee has two older brothers and one younger brother.

Lee graduated from Pai Chai University's department of film and performing arts. While in university, he competed in the 2011 MBC University Song Festival.

== Personal life ==
On March 6, 2025, it was announced that Lee was going to marry his girlfriend that month after dating for nine years.

== Discography ==
=== Studio albums ===
Title	Album details	Peak chart positions	Sales
Title	Album details	KOR	Sales
Even If Things Fall Apart (폐허가 된다 해도)	Released: November 24, 2021; Label: ShowPLAY Entertainment; Format: CD, digital download	5	KOR: 73,772
Shelter of Dreams (꿈의 거처)	Released: January 26, 2023; Label: Mareumo; Format: LP, CD, digital download	5	KOR: 88,470
Yeok Seong (역성)	Released: October 24, 2024; Label: Mareumo; Format: CD, digital download	8	KOR: 113,786
Album 0 (0집)	Released: June 26, 2026; Label: Mareumo; Format: 2×CD, digital download	5	KOR: 29,538

=== Live albums ===
Title	Album details	Peak chart positions	Sales
Title	Album details	KOR	Sales
Docking: Liftoff	Released: May 21, 2024; Label: Mareumo; Format: CD, digital download	24	KOR: 5,871

=== Extended plays ===
Title	Album details	Peak chart positions	Sales
Title	Album details	KOR	Sales
How Pretty the Moon Is (달이 참 예쁘다고)	Released: September 11, 2018; Label: Alary-Kansion; Format: CD, digital download	—	
From the Dawn (새벽이 빌려 준 마음)	Released: August 28, 2019; Label: Alary-Kansion; Format: CD, digital download	—	
Pre-Release 3rd Album [Yeok Seong]	Released: July 3, 2024; Label: Mareumo; Format: CD, digital download	6	KOR: 58,400

=== Singles ===
Title	Year	Peak chart positions		Album
Title	Year	KOR	KOR Down.	Album
"Today" (오늘도)	2013	—	—	Non-album singles
"The Rebels" (반역가들)	2013	—	—	Non-album singles
"How Pretty the Moon Is" (달이 참 예쁘다고)	2018	—	27	How Pretty the Moon Is
"From the Dawn" (새벽이 빌려 준 마음)	2019	—	—	From the Dawn
"Warped Exterior" (뒤척이는 허울)	2019	—	—	From the Dawn
"Summer in 1995" (1995년 여름)	2020	—	23	Shelter of Dreams
"Hero Collector" (영웅 수집가)	2020	—	18	Shelter of Dreams
"Unspoken" (들려주고 싶었던)	2021	79	6	Non-album single
"Words Befitting One Who Loves Someone" (누군가를 사랑하는 사람다운 말)	2021	104	3	Even If Things Fall Apart
"Open Your Textbook" (교재를 펼쳐봐)	2021	123	5	Even If Things Fall Apart
"Even If Things Fall Apart" (폐허가 된다 해도)	2021	95	2	Even If Things Fall Apart
"Upon a Smile" (웃어주었어)	2022	108	8	Shelter of Dreams
"Pricey Hangover" (비싼 숙취)	2023	143	4	Shelter of Dreams
"Shelter of Dreams" (꿈의 거처)	2023	88	2	Shelter of Dreams
"Pokzook Time" (폭죽타임)	2024	137	1	Pre-Release 3rd Album [Yeok Seong]
"Waterfall" (폭포)	2024	139	2	Pre-Release 3rd Album [Yeok Seong]
"Yeok Seong" (역성)	2024	—	12	Yeok Seong
"Empty Space Above" (여백 한켠에)	2024	—	3	Non-album singles
"PunKanon"	2025	—	24	Non-album singles

=== Soundtrack appearances ===
Title	Year	Peak chart positions		Album
Title	Year	KOR	KOR Down.	Album
"We Are"	2021	—	40	Law School OST
"Consolation" (위로) (with Kim Bum-soo)	2021	—	87	Sing Again Part 2
"Amor Fati" (아모르 파티)	2021	—	62	Sing Again Part 4
"This is Mine"	2021	—	39	Mine OST
"Water" (물) (with Lee Juck)	2021	—	59	Sing Again Part 6
"Mango Shake" (망고쉐이크)	2021	—	88	Sing Again Part 7
"You Crush on Me" (넌 내게 반했어) (with No Brain)	2021	—	94	Sing Again Part 8
"Love, Two" (사랑 Two)	2021	—	44	Sing Again Part 9
"To J" (J에게) (with Lee Sun-hee)	2021	—	38	Sing Again Part 10
"I Am Lost"	2021	—	18	Reflection of You OST
"The Giving Tree" (언덕나무)	2022	24	1	Our Beloved Summer OST
"I Remember You"	2022	192	12	Mental Coach Jegal OST
"When You Appeared"	2025	—	10	When the Stars Gossip OST
"Last Story" (남겨진 이야기)	2025	—	34	Buried Hearts OST

== Filmography ==
=== Television ===
Year	Title	Role	Notes	Ref.
2020–2021	Sing Again	Himself	Placed first	
2021	Famous Singer	Himself	Spin-off of Sing Again	

== Awards and nominations ==
Award	Year	Category	Nominee	Result	Ref.
K-World Dream Awards	2023	Best Rock	Lee Seung-yoon	Won	
Korean Music Awards	2025	Musician of the Year	Lee Seung-yoon	Won	
Korean Music Awards	2025	Best Rock Song	"Anthems of Defiance"	Won	
Korean Music Awards	2025	Best Modern Rock Song	"Waterfall"	Won	
Korean Music Awards	2025	Best Rock Album	Yeok Seong	Nominated	
Seoul Music Awards	2022	Discovery of the Year	Lee Seung-yoon	Won	

=== Listicles ===
Publisher	Year	Listicle	Ranking	Ref.
Forbes	2022	Korea Power Celebrity 40	34th	
Forbes	2023	Korea Power Celebrity 40	29th	
