= Project Apricot =

Project Apricot may refer to:

- ACT Computer Apricot, a MS-DOS computer by ACT in 1983
- Yo Frankie! (codenamed "Apricot"), an open content video game by the Blender Foundation (2008)
