= Hypnosis Therapy =

South Korean hip-hop duo

- Origin: Busan, South Korea
- Genres: electronic; experimental hip-hop
- Years active: 2022-present
- Members: Jflow; Jjangyou

Hypnosis Therapy (Korean: 힙노시스 테라피) is a South Korean hip-hop, electronic duo. The group is a supergroup formed by Jflow, who is well known as a member of Hippy Was Gipsy, and Jjangyou, who gained popularity through his solo career. Since their formation in 2022, the group has released the studio albums Hypnosis Therapy (2022), Psilocybin (2023) and Raw Survival (2024).

== History ==
Jjangyou and Jflow are both from Busan, and they have been together in the group Wavisabiroom, which formed in 2015. They formed a team Hypnosis Therapy in 2022 and released a self-titled studio album the same year. IZM's Jang Joonhwan described the album as "Experimental hip-hop albums incorporating electronica, which are so explicitly approached to the essence like this album, are rare."

They participated in festivals such as South by Southwest and released their second album, Psilocybin, the following year. On 25 October 2024, they released their third album, Raw Survival, which was nominated for the best electronic album of the Korean Music Awards.

== Discography ==
=== Studio albums ===
- Hypnosis Therapy (2022)
- Psilocybin (2023)
- Raw Survival (2024)

=== EPs ===
- Dance Therapy (2023)
- latency (2026)
