= W24 (band) =

South Korean rock band

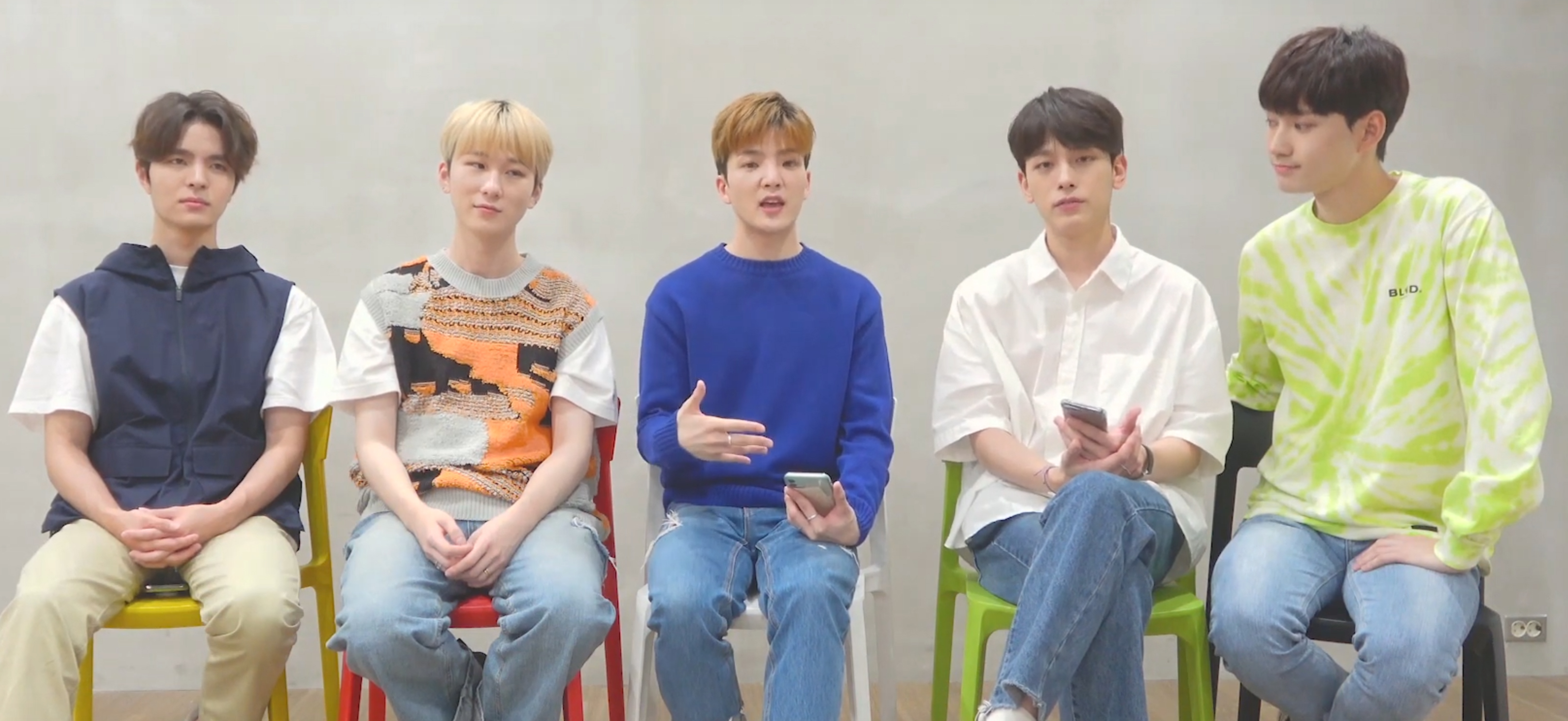
- W24 in August 2020; From L-R: Park Ji-won, Park Aaron, Cheong Ho-won, Kim Jong-gil, Kim Yun-soo

Background information
- Origin: Seoul, South Korea
- Genres: K-pop, rock
- Years active: 2018–present
- Label: Favor
- Members: Kim Yun-soo; Kim Jong-gil; Cheong Ho-won; Park Aaron
- Past members: Park Ji-won
- Website: favor.im/W24

W24 (Korean: 더블유24; RR: Deobeulyu24) is a South Korean idol rock band signed to Favor Entertainment. The quartet consists of leader and guitarist Kim Yun-soo, drummer Kim Jong-gil, vocalist Cheong Ho-won and keyboardist Park Aaron. W24 was originally a five-piece ensemble; bassist Park Ji-won left the band on December 27, 2020. They debuted on March 8, 2018, with the extended play (EP) Singing Dancing and promoted various songs from the record. By the end of the year, the band received the Focus Award at the Asia Artist Awards and traveled to Chile to become the first K-pop group to appear at the Teletón charity event.

== History ==
Kim Jong-gil, the drummer and original leader of W24, had close ties with the CEO of J Army Entertainment. He attended Seoul Institute of the Arts, where he met keyboardist Park Aaron, bassist Park Ji-won, and guitarist Kim Yun-soo. After graduating from the institution, Kim Jong-gil brought together his fellow three alumni together upon recommendation by the CEO to form a band. The four practiced together for two years. Cheong Ho-won was added to the lineup eight months prior to the band's debut upon successfully auditioning to become its vocalist. He joined the group because he wanted to "touch people's hearts". W24 was formed as a idol quintet. The name is short for World 24 Hours, expressing the band's desire for their music to be heard for 24 hours around the world. Other group name considerations included One Way, Luminant, and Royal Family.

Preceding their first mini-album, W24 released the track "Love Me". Their debut mini-album Singing Dancing and its lead single "Always Missing You" were released on March 8, 2018. The band included songs that they felt were "easy and accessible" to a general audience. They embarked on followup promotions for "Everything Is Fine" and the title track. They released the digital single Sosime on October 29. The lyrics describe a timid and introverted man, a reflection of the band members. W24's work earned them the Focus Award at the 2018 Asia Artist Awards. The band traveled to Chile and appeared at the annual Teletón charity event, becoming the first K-pop group to do so. The disco-funk single "Solfamiredo" was released one month ahead of the band's second mini-album. Stay a Moment and its title track of the same name were released on August 1, 2019. W24 released a string of singles throughout 2020, including "Joahaeyo" and "Sunday Night". In November, W24 entered to compete in the reality competition show Asian Top Band. The group eventually finished in first place, winning the final title of "1st Asian Top Band". Park Ji-won terminated his contract with J Army and he left the band on December 27.

On March 8, 2021, W24 released a digital single titled "Breath" to mark the third anniversary of their debut.

On April 4, 2022, W24 released their first studio album White Album and its lead singles "Revelations" and "J♡B = Love".

== Musical style ==
W24 has creative control over their music. All the members contribute to the lyrics, composition, arrangement, and record production of their records. Their debut mini-album Singing Dancing comprised acoustic tracks, while "Sosime" saw the band incorporate a more rock-oriented sound. W24 has cited The 1975 as their role model, highlighting the English band's balance between synthesizer-based music and acoustic sound.

== Members ==
=== Active ===
- Kim Yun-soo (김윤수) – guitar
- Kim Jong-gil (김종길) – drums
- Cheong Ho-won (정호원) – leader, vocals
- Park Aaron (박아론) – keyboard

=== Former ===
- Park Ji-won (박지원) – bass

== Discography ==
=== Studio albums ===
List of studio albums and showing selected details
| Title | Details |
|---|---|
| White Album | Released: April 4, 2022; Label: Favor, Caios; Formats: CD, digital download, streaming |

=== Extended plays ===
List of extended plays, showing selected details and selected chart positions
| Title | Details | Peak chart positions |
| Title | Details | KOR |
|---|---|---|
| Singing Dancing | Released: March 8, 2018; Label: Favor, Caios; Formats: CD, digital download, streaming | — |
| Stay a Moment | Released: August 1, 2019; Label: Favor, Caios; Formats: CD, digital download, streaming | 86 |
| Memory Making Moment | Released: June 3, 2024; Label: Favor; Formats: CD, digital download, streaming | — |
"—" denotes a recording that did not chart or was not released in that territory

=== Live albums ===
List of live albums and showing selected details
| Title | Album details |
|---|---|
| Real Live Nanjang Vol.8 | Released: September 6, 2018; Label: Nanjang, Kobuco; Format: Digital download |

=== Singles ===
List of singles, showing year released and name of the album
| Title | Year | Album |
|---|---|---|
| "Love Me" | 2018 | Singing Dancing |
| "Always Missing You" (점퍼 챙겨 나와) | 2018 | Singing Dancing |
| "Sosime" (소심해) | 2018 | Non-album single |
| "Solfamiredo" (솔파미레도) | 2019 | Stay a Moment |
| "Stay a Moment" (거기 잠시라도) | 2019 | Stay a Moment |
| "Joahaeyo" (좋아해요) | 2020 | Non-album singles |
| "Sunday Night" | 2020 | Non-album singles |
| "SNP (Shining Nature Purity)" | 2020 | Non-album singles |
| "A Night in Naju" (나주의 밤) | 2020 | Non-album singles |
| "Breath" (숨) | 2021 | Non-album singles |
| "Once Upon a Time" (어린 날) | 2021 | Non-album singles |
| "Fine" (괜찮아질 거야 | 2021 | Non-album singles |
| "My Universe" (언제까지나) | 2021 | Non-album singles |
| "Song of Songs" | 2022 | Non-album singles |
| "Revelations" (이밤 어덤 속을 밝힐게요) | 2022 | White Album |
| "J♡B = Love" (꾸준히) | 2022 | White Album |
| "Ruah" (루아) | 2022 | Great Seoul Invasion Section 3 |
| "Over the Rainbow" (무지개가 떴습니다) (featuring Yoon Eun-hye) | 2022 | Great Seoul Invasion Secting 6 |
| "Coupon Man" | 2023 | Born Again |
| "Drive" | 2023 | Born Again |
| "Voyager" (새로운 행성을 찾을 거야) | 2023 | Non-album singles |
| "Our, Season" (그때의 나이, 너와 나) | 2024 | Non-album singles |
| "Celestial Night" (천문의 밤) | 2024 | Memory Making Moment |
| "Nemo" | 2024 | Memory Making Moment |
| "Family" | 2024 | Memory Making Moment |
| "Rooftop" | 2024 | Non-album singles |
| "Seize the Day" | 2025 | Seize The Day |
| "Trava U Doma" | 2025 | Non-album singles |
| "I Gotta Feeling" | 2025 | Non-album singles |
| "Mustard Seed" | 2026 | Non-album singles |
| "Water Gushes" | 2026 | Non-album singles |
| "Somang" | 2026 | Non-album singles |

== Awards and nominations ==
| Year | Nominee / work | Award | Result | Ref. |
|---|---|---|---|---|
| 2018 | W24 | Asia Artist Awards – Focus Award | Won | |
