= Superstar K =

South Korean television series

- Title card (2012–present)
- Hangul: 슈퍼스타 K
- RR: Syupeoseuta K
- MR: Syup'ŏsŭt'a K
- Judges: Lee Seung-chul (2009–2014); Lee Hyori (2009); Yang Hyun-seok (2009); Yoon Jong-shin (2010–2011, 2013–2015); Uhm Jung-hwa (2010); Yoon Mi-rae (2011–2012); Psy (2012); Lee Ha-neul (2013); Baek Ji-young (2014–2015); Sung Si-kyung (2015); Kim Bum-soo (2014–2016); Gummy (2016); Gil Seong-joon (2016); Kim Yeon Woo (2016); Brave Brothers (2016); Ailee (2016); Han Sung Ho (2016)
- Theme music composer: Hajak
- Country of origin: South Korea
- Original language: Korean
- No. of seasons: 8
- No. of episodes: 110; 12 (Superstar K1); 14 (Superstar K2); 14 (Superstar K3); 15 (Superstar K4); 15 (Superstar K5); 14 (Superstar K6); 14 (Superstar K7); 12 (Superstar K 2016)

Production
- Production locations: Initial auditions: Various locations in Korea, China, USA, and later Australia
- Running time: 80 – 90 minutes (regular); 48 – 169 minutes
- Production companies: CJ E&M Music and Live; CJ E&M; Signal Entertainment Group (since 2016)

Original release
- Network: Mnet
- Release: 2009 – 2016

Superstar K (Korean: 슈퍼스타 K) is a South Korean television talent show series which is held yearly. First held in 2009, Superstar K has increasingly gained more attention, considered the biggest audition program in South Korea. Superstar K's concept involves that of finding the next "superstar," with the winner each week determined with a combination of the scores given by judges and votes from viewers.

The show received immense popularity for its first three seasons, discovering popular acts such as Seo In-guk, Huh Gak, John Park, Kang Seungyoon, Ulala Session and Busker Busker, and reached its peak in ratings in its fourth season with Roy Kim and Jung Joon-young as its forefront. The show saw a decline in popularity and ratings starting from its fifth season. The eighth season of Superstar K broke with tradition and abandoned the series number in its name, and was instead called Superstar K 2016.

Traditionally, the award winner of each season is given the chance to perform at the Mnet Asian Music Awards as well as receive other prizes.

== Seasons ==
- Superstar K1
- Superstar K2
- Superstar K3
- Superstar K4
- Superstar K5
- Superstar K6
- Superstar K7
- Superstar K 2016

== Winning contestants ==
Year	Season	Winner	Runner-up
2009	Superstar K1	Seo In-guk	Joo Moon-geun
2010	Superstar K2	Huh Gak	John Park
2011	Superstar K3	Ulala Session	Busker Busker
2012	Superstar K4	Roy Kim	DickPunks
2013	Superstar K5	Parc Jae-jung	Park Si-hwan
2014	Superstar K6	Kwak Jin-eon	Kim Feel
2015	Superstar K7	Kevin Oh	Cheon Dan-bi
2016	Superstar K 2016	Kim Young Geun	Lee Ji Eun
