= Minseo (singer, born 1996) =

South Korean singer and actress (born 1996)

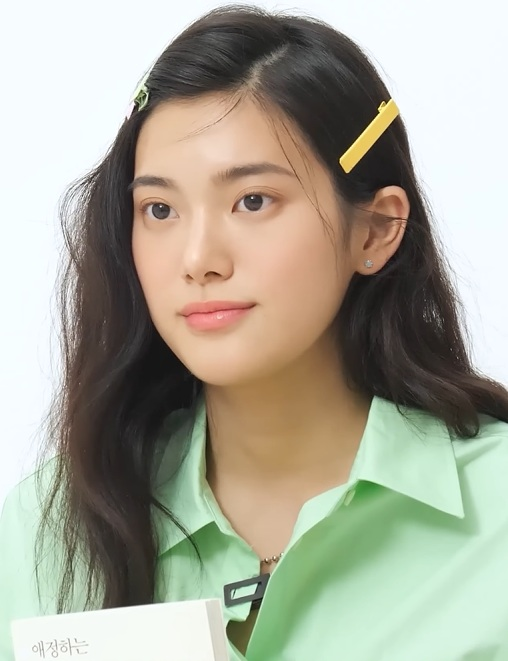
- Minseo in 2022
- Born: Kim Min-seo; April 9, 1996 (age 30); South Korea
- Education: Hanyang Women's University
- Occupations: Singer; actress
- Years active: 2015–present
- Agent: Bill Entertainment
- Musical career
- Genres: K-pop; ballad
- Instrument: Vocals
- Years active: 2015–present
- Labels: Mystic Story; LOEN Entertainment

Korean name
- Hangul: 김민서
- RR: Gim Minseo
- MR: Kim Minsŏ

Kim Min-seo (Korean: 김민서; born April 9, 1996), known mononymously as Minseo, is a South Korean singer and actress. She was selected as part of the Top 8 on Superstar K 7. She made her official debut in 2018 with "Wonderful Dream".

== Early life and education ==
Minseo was born on April 9, 1996. She liked to sing, joining a children's choir and participating in various children's song festivals. She spent her childhood in difficult financial circumstances after middle school. When she was 15, she started training to be in a girl group with Eunha, SinB, and others. However, Minseo left the company when she was 18.

Minseo graduated from the Practical Music Department at Ahyeon Industrial Information School. In 2015, Minseo entered the Practical Music Department of Hanyang Women's University. She attended college with financial aid from a national scholarship but took a leave of absence for economic reasons.

== Career ==
=== 2015–2017: Pre-debut: Superstar K 7, "Monthly Yoon Jong-shin" ===
In 2015, Minseo participated in Superstar K 7. On August 20, the Superstar K 7 pre-release video was released and Minseo received public attention. In the preliminaries, Minseo passed with positive reviews from judges Yoon Jong-shin, Baek Ji-young, and Ailee. In the first round, she sang Park Ji-yoon's "Fantasy" alongside Yoo Yu-min and Lee Ji-hee and was eliminated. However, after she was eliminated, she was passed by the judges. Minseo sang IU's "The Story Only I Didn't Know" with Gil Min-ji, passing and advancing to the live broadcast finals. Minseo advanced past the Top 10 stage with Kang Susie's "Scattered Days". For the Top 8 stage, she sang Jang Deok's "Girl and Street Light" and was eliminated. After she was eliminated, she was offered the main vocalist position in a girl group from a number of agencies. She was also offered an appearance on Produce 101.

On May 27, 2016, Minseo signed an exclusive contract with Apop, a music label under Mystic Story. On June 3, Minseo released the single "The Sound of You Coming" for The Handmaiden with labelmate Gain. On October 14, singer Yoon Jong-shin announced through his Instagram account that Minseo would participate in Mystic Entertainment's music project "Monthly Yoon Jong-shin". At midnight on October 18, Minseo released "2016 Monthly Yoon Jong Shin October Issue" with Yoon. She also acted in the music video of the title track "First" with Joo Woo-jae. On November 23, Yoon announced that Minseo would participate in "Monthly Yoon Jong-shin" again, marking the first time a singer had participated in the project for two months in a row. On the same day, Minseo released a motion poster for "Monthly Yoon Jong-shin November 2016". On November 25, Minseo released a photo of her working with photographer Kim Joong-man before the release of her new single. At midnight on November 27, Minseo and Yoon released "2016 Monthly Yoon Jong-shin November Issue". Minseo also acted in the music video for the title song "You Who Loved You". On the same day, Minseo sang "The Missing Girl" at Yoon's concert "Lyricist Yoon Jong-shin Concert Special Lecture 2nd Class" at Samsung Hall, Ewha Womans University.

On November 6, 2017, Minseo announced that she would release her debut album. Her debut album was produced by producer Jo Young-cheol. On November 15, Minseo announced that she would be participating in Yoon's "Monthly Yoon Jong-shin November 2017". The title track "Yes" ranked first on real-time charts for about two weeks after its release. Minseo was also nominated for first place on Music Bank, Music Core, and Inkigayo. On December 1, Minseo appeared on a live music broadcast for the first time, on Music Bank. Minseo received two music show wins, Inkigayo on December 3 and Music Bank on December 8.

=== 2018–present: The Diary of Youth ===
On February 14, 2018, Mystic Entertainment announced that Minseo's official debut had been postponed to early March due to the success of "Yes". On February 23, Minseo announced the name and release date of The Diary of Youth and the name of the title track, "Wonderful Dream". On February 26, Minseo announced that she would release four songs sequentially, starting with title track "Wonderful Dream". On February 28, Minseo revealed that composer Lee Min-soo and lyricist Kim Eana worked on the title track. On March 6, Minseo made her debut with the release of her first single "Wonderful Dream" from The Diary of Youth.

In May 2023, Minseo signed with a new agency, Bill Entertainment.

== Discography ==
=== Extended plays ===
Title	Album details	Peak chart positions	Sales
Title	Album details	KOR	Sales
The Diary of Youth	Released: January 29, 2019; Publisher: Kakao M; Agency: Mystic Entertainment; Formats: CD, digital download	48	—
"—" denotes a recording that did not chart or was not released in that territory

=== Singles ===
Title	Year	Peak chart positions		Album
Title	Year	KOR	KOR Hot 100	Album
As lead artist
"The Grand Dreams"	2018	—	—	The Diary of Youth
"Weird You"	2018	—	—	Non-album single
"Growing Up"	2018	—	—	The Diary of Youth
"Is Who"	2018	—	—	The Diary of Youth
"2cm (feat. Paul Kim)"	2018	—	—	The Diary of Youth
"Zero"	2018	—	—	Non-album single
As featuring artist
"그대" (Yoo Seung-woo feat. Minseo)	2019	—	—	Yoo Seung Woo 2
Collaborations
"Yes" (좋아) (with Yoon Jong-shin)	2017	1	1	Monthly Project 2017 Yoon Jong Shin
Soundtrack appearances
"The Sound of You Coming" (Note: Alternatively "The Footsteps of My Dear Love"; various translations of "임이 오는 소리") (with Gain)	2016	—	—N/a	The Handmaiden OST
"You Must Love Me" (질투하나봐)	2017	—	—	Jugglers OST
"The First Love"	2019	—	—	He Is Psychometric OST
"Star"	2019	—	—	Doctor John OST
"Until the Day"	2020	—	—	Memorials OST
"Missing You" (너를 바라만 보는 게)	2022	—	—	Moonshine OST
"Goodbye" (이만 안녕)	2024	—	—	Man and Woman OST
"—" denotes releases that did not chart or were not released in that region. Note: Billboard Korea K-Pop Hot 100 was introduced in August 2011 and discontinued in July 2014, re-established in December 2017 and discontinued again in April 2022.

== Filmography ==
=== Television series ===
Year	Title	Role	Notes	Ref.
2017	Weekly Idol	Guest	July 12	
2017	Hyena on the Keyboard	Guest	October 8	
2021	Imitation	Yu Ri-ah	Supporting	
2027	Palace Land	Han Ah-reum		

=== Web series ===
Year	Title	Role	Notes	Ref.
2017	Somehow 18	Daeun	Supporting	
2025	Love.exe	Kang Dong-won	Supporting	

=== Television programs ===
Year	Title	Role	Notes	Ref.
2015	Superstar K 7	Herself	Top 8	
2018	You Hee-yeol's Sketchbook	Herself	Ep. 383	
2018	2018 Idol Star Athletics Bowling Archery Rhythmic Gymnastics Aerobics Championships	Contestant		
2018	King of Mask Singer	"Vietnam Girl"	Finalist	
2021	Immortal Songs: Singing the Legend	Guest	Ep. 527; with Choi Jung-in	

=== Music video appearances ===
Year	Title	Artist	Notes	Ref.
2016	"First"	Yoon Jong-shin	with Joo Woo-jae	

== Awards and nominations ==
Name of the award ceremony, year presented, nominated work, category and the result of the nomination
Award ceremony	Year	Nominated work	Category	Result	Ref.
Apolo Awards	2017	"The Sound of You Coming" (임이 오는 소리)	Best Song	Won	
Melon Music Awards	2018	Minseo	Best New Female Artist	Nominated	
