= Chi Gamma Epsilon =

Social fraternity at Dartmouth College, U.S.

- ΧΓΕ
- Chi Gamma Epsilon coat of arms
- Founded: 1981; 45 years ago Dartmouth College
- Type: Social
- Affiliation: Independent
- Former affiliation: Kappa Sigma (1904-1981)
- Status: Active
- Scope: Local
- Motto: "Come As You Are"
- Symbol: Moon and star
- Mascot: Phoenix
- Chapters: 1
- Nickname: Chi Gam
- Headquarters: 7 Webster Avenue; Hanover, New Hampshire 03755; United States
- Website: www.chigammaepsilon.org

Chi Gamma Epsilon (ΧΓΕ) is a local fraternity at the American Ivy League university of Dartmouth College. "Chi Gam," as it is commonly known, was part of the Kappa Sigma fraternity before breaking off for political reasons.

== History ==
=== Predecessors ===
Chi Gamma Epsilon has been part of Dartmouth College’s Greek life for over a century. It was founded in 1904 as the local fraternity Beta Gamma. A year later, in 1905, the fraternity gained national recognition and was granted a charter as the Gamma Epsilon chapter of Kappa Sigma.

=== Transition to a local fraternity ===
By the early 1980s, tensions between the Dartmouth chapter and the national Kappa Sigma fraternity began to rise. The disagreement centered around financial obligations and autonomy, particularly when the chapter's house faced unexpected structural expenses. In 1981, after the national fraternity declined to assist in funding essential repairs, the brothers made the pivotal decision to sever ties with Kappa Sigma and become an independent, local fraternity. To mark this transition, the house was renamed Kappa Sigma Gamma.

However, legal challenges from the Kappa Sigma national organization over the use of its name led the fraternity to adopt a temporary designation, 7 Webster Avenue, in 1983. Following a period of deliberation, the brothers voted on March 31, 1987, to rename the fraternity Chi Gamma Epsilon. The new name retained elements of the house’s history, with Gamma Epsilon honoring its roots as the Gamma Epsilon chapter of Kappa Sigma.

On campus, Chi Gam is known for its dance parties such as Gammapalooza and its house pong game known as Ship.

== Symbols ==
Chi Gamma Epsilon's motto is "Come As You Are". Its symbols are a star and the moon. Its mascot is the phoenix, chosen to recall the fraternity's recovery after a house fire. The fraternity's nickname is Chi Gam.

The Chi Gamma Epsilon crest consists of a phoenix behind a shield that features a star, moon, the Roman numerals VIII to represent its address of 7 Webster Avenue, a mountain that symbolizes solidarity between the brothers and paths on the mountain noting that "We met here at Dartmouth, our paths will meet again, later on in life". Below the shield is a motto with a genie's lamp to represent intelligence and a winged foot to represent athletics.

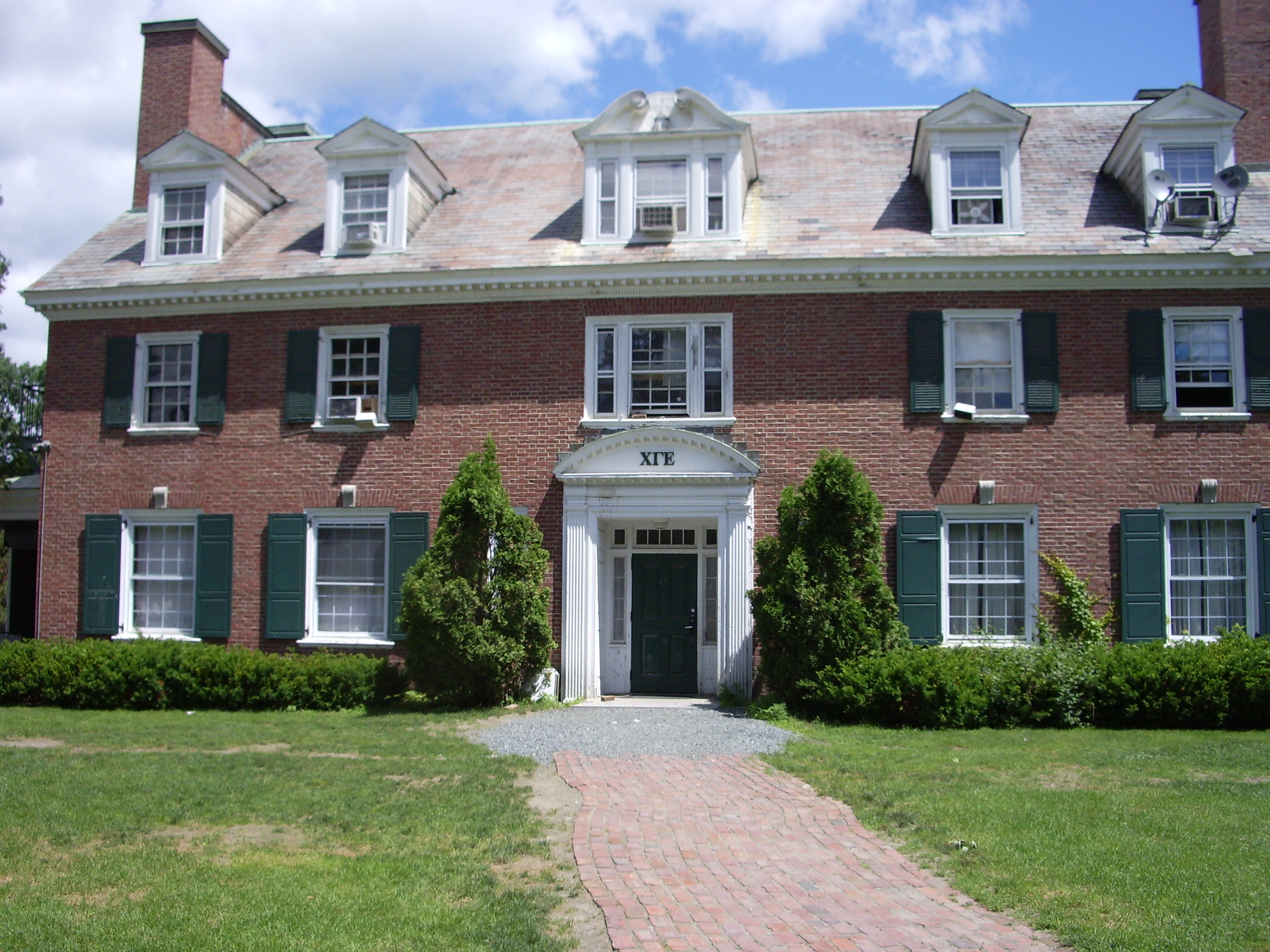
Chi Gamma Epsilon chapter house

== Chapter house ==
From 1914 to 1916, the brothers raised funds to construct a small house at 7 Webster Avenue, marking the beginning of the fraternity’s presence at its current location. In 1935, the original structure was razed, and a new chapter house was completed by 1937.

== Notable members ==
Some of Chi Gamma Epsilon's notable alumni include:

- Brad Ausmus (1991), professional baseball player, manager, and coach
- Jim Beattie (1976), professional baseball player and manager
- Russell Carson (1955), co-founder of Welsh, Carson, Anderson & Stowe
- John Donahoe (1982), CEO of Nike, chairman of PayPal, and former CEO of eBay
- Anthony Fahden (2008), competitive rower who participated in the 2012 Summer Olympics
- Josh Konieczny (2013), competitive rower who participated in the 2016 Summer Olympics
- Kevin Oh (2012), singer-songwriter and winner of Superstar K7
- Mike Remlinger (1987), professional baseball player with the San Francisco Giants, New York Mets, Cincinnati Reds, Atlanta Braves, Chicago Cubs, and the Boston Red Sox
- Burke W. Whitman (1978), Major General United States Marine Corps

== See also ==
- Dartmouth College fraternities and sororities
- List of social fraternities
