= Superstar K 5 =

- Season 5
- Promotional poster
- Hosted by: Kim Sung-Joo
- Judges: Lee Seung-chul; Yoon Jong-shin; Lee Ha-neul
- Winner: Park Jae Jung
- Runner-up: Park Shi Hwan
- Finals venue: Jamsil Indoor Stadium

Release
- Original network: Mnet; KM; Mnet Japan
- Original release: August 9 – November 15, 2013

Season chronology
- ← Previous; Superstar K 4 Next → Superstar K 6

Superstar K 5 (Korean: 슈퍼스타 K5) is the fifth season of the South Korean television talent show series Superstar K, which premiered on 9 August 2013 on Mnet and aired Friday nights at 11PM KST. On July 11, 2013, it was confirmed that Lee Seung-chul and Yoon Jong-shin would be returning to join the judges member panel, the latter having been missing from the previous season. This season also saw the addition of Lee Ha-neul of DJ DOC as a judge following the departure of Yoon Mi-rae. This season saw over 1,982,661 applicants across the multiple avenues of entry for the show.

== Regional auditions ==
Audition hopefuls could audition in any of the several available audition venues. Additionally, new ways were devised for those unable to attend including as via UGC, KakaoTalk, Karaoke rooms or via secret nomination from family or friends.

Preliminary auditions for the 1st, 2nd and 3rd Regionals were held in these cities:

Episode air dates	Audition city	Date	Audition Venue	SuperWeek Tickets
August 9–30, 2013	Seoul	June 29–30, 2013	Seoul World Cup Stadium	29
August 9, 2013	Busan	May 4, 2013	Busan Exhibition and Convention Center	16
August 9, 2013	Jeju	April 28, 2013	Jeju City Civic Center	3
August 9, 2013	Los Angeles	May 25, 2013	Los Angeles Theatre Center	3
August 9, 2013	New York City	May 25, 2013	In2 Church	4
August 16, 2013	Boston	May 28, 2013	Berklee College of Music	2
August 16, 2013	Vancouver	May 28, 2013	Orpheum Annex Theatre	1
August 16–23, 2013	Incheon	June 6, 2013	Incheon Samsan World Gymnasium	12
August 16–23, 2013	Chuncheon	May 17, 2013	Chuncheon Lakeside Gymnasium	13
August 16–23, 2013	Gwangju	May 19, 2013	Kimdaejung Convention Center	10
— ^{a}	Daegu	June 1, 2013	EXCO	2
— ^{a}	Daejeon	June 22, 2013	Daejeon Convention Center	5
Total Number of tickets to SuperWeek				100

- ^Note a The Daegu and Daejeon audition episodes were not aired due to production scheduling.

=== Preliminary auditions ===
The preliminary auditions, whilst having traditionally featured either one of the three main judges, has also featured special judges for certain regional auditions. Confirmed special judges that will be featured in the preliminaries will include: Jung Jae-hyung, 2AM member Jo Kwon, Joo Hyun-mi, Brown Eyed Girls' Gain, solo singer Ivy, Clazziquai's Alex and Son Dam-bi.

== SuperWeek ==
With 100 contestants from the audition rounds; judges were given the task of reducing these numbers to 50 through an individual elimination round. The next round consisting of contestants splitting into groups where they were both judged and then advanced onto the next round.

The newest addition to the Superstar K 5 format was the BlackWeek round, where contestants participated in a rival collaboration mission. For this round, contestants were given scores by a small focus audience which added weight to the scoring of the judges, who ultimately made the final decisions on the next fifteen contestants to advance to the next round. The fifteen contestants were flown to Jeju Island, where each contestant was given an envelope to be unopened. Inside this enveloped contained a pre-determined decision by the judges on whether the contestant had already made it to the final ten; however, contestants had to partake in a final elimination round which could either reconfirm the judges decision or force them to change the content of the envelope.

== Finalists ==
Plan B (플랜비) is a four-member vocalist group, made up of an assortment of other male contestants whom were either solo singers or duo groups who were forced to band together as part of the SuperWeek rounds. The group currently consists of: Lee Kyung-hyun, Lee Dong-hoon, Yoon Tae-kyung and Choi Jung-hoon.

Jung Eun-woo (정은우; born February 4, 1997) is from Daejeon, South Korea. She previously auditioned for the first season of Superstar K and was also a former trainee at LOEN Entertainment.

Song Hee Jin (born August 19, 1995) is from Seoul, South Korea. In 2017, she debuted with girl group Good Day under C9 Entertainment.

Parc Jae-jung (박재정) (born December 25, 1995) is from Orlando, Florida. In 2015, he was signed to Mystic Entertainment.

Weebly (위블리) is a three-member female vocalist group. The group consists of Nam Ju-mi, Lee Soo-min and Lee Gi-lim.

Im Sun-young (임순영; born February 26, 1988), also known as Neo Yim, was born in Seoul, South Korea. He is from Boston, Massachusetts, where he previously attended Berklee College of Music. Neo is also a competitive player in the Super Street Fighter IV circuit, known by the pseudonym WeirdoNeo. He finished in 5th place for East Coast Throwdown 5 in Super Street Fighter 4 Arcade Edition v2012 in early 2013, using character Juri.

Kim Min-ji (김민지; born July 13, 1993) is from Seoul, South Korea.

Jang Won-ki (장원기; born February 5, 1981) is from Ganghwado, South Korea. A solo singer; he was also once part of a R&B group called EbonyHill (에보니힐) where he served as the main vocalist.

MashBro (마시브로) is a collaborative group between the male vocalist group, 'NeighBro' (네이브로) and the rock band, 'Maysta Band' (마시따 밴드). The members of 'NeighBro' consist of Kim Kyo-bum, Lee Seung-hyun, Jung Won-bo and Yoon Soo-yong; whereas 'Maysta Band' includes: Shin Seok-chul, Lee Kyung-nam and Hong Jin-young.

Park Si-hwan (박시환) is a mechanic, aged 28. TOP 2 (born July 30, 1987)

== Finals ==
Unlike the previous season, there were 10 finalists for this season. The scoring of each contestants was a summation of the judges score, which consisted of 40%, and the general public votes which made up the remaining 60%. In each elimination episode, two contestants were eliminated from those of the bottom three contestants who had received the lowest overall score. However, while the lowest contestants was automatically eliminated, the remaining eliminated spot was decided by a general public vote on the other two remaining contestants, with the result revealed in the following episode.

=== Top 10 – Time Capsule ===
Order	Contestant	Song (original artist)	Year	Result
1	Mashi Bro	"Growl" (EXO)	2013	Eliminated
2	Jung Eun-woo	"풀잎사랑 (Love Grass)" (Cho Sung-soo)	1987	Safe
3	Im Soon-young	"Rain" (Lee Juck)	1999	Bottom 3
4	Jang Won-gi	"Itaewon Freedom" (UV)	2011	Safe
5	Kim Min-ji	"인디언 인형처럼 (Like an Indian Doll)" (나미)	1989	Safe
6	Weebly	"NoNoNo" (A Pink)	2013	Eliminated
7	Park Si-hwan	"그녀의 연인에게 (To Her Lover)" (K2)	1999	Safe
8	Park Jae-jung	"차마 (Endure)" (Sung Si-kyung)	2003	Safe
9	Plan B	"그대와 함께 (With You)" (더 블루)	1994	Safe
10	Song Hee Jin	"바람기억 (Memory Of The Wind)" (나얼)	2012	Safe

- Group performance: "처음 그 느낌처럼 (Like The First Feeling)" (Shin Seung-hun)

=== Top 8 – Special Thanks To ===
Order	Contestant	Song (original artist)	Year	Result
1	Jung Eun-woo	"내겐 너니까 (Because You're My Only One)" (Hyolyn)	2011	Eliminated
2	Plan B	"I Pray 4 U" (Shinhwa)	2002	Eliminated
3	Kim Min-ji	"R.P.G. Shine" (W&Whale)	2008	Bottom 3
4	Im Soon-young	"Bravo, My Life!" (봄여름가을겨울)	2002	Safe
5	Park Si-hwan	"Feeling" (Kim Sa-rang)	1999	Safe
6	Song Hee Jin	"Higher" (Ailee)	2013	Safe
7	Jang Won-gi	"미안 미안해 (Sorry, I'm Sorry)" (Tae Jin-ah)	1989	Safe
8	Park Jae-jung	"동네 (Neighborhood)" (Kim Hyun-chul)	1989	Safe

=== Top 6 – Judge's Choice of Song ===
The contestants sang songs from any of the judges that they were assigned to for this episode.

Order	Contestant	Song (original artist)	Year	Result
1	Im Soon-young	"망고쉐이크 (Mango Shake)" (Yoon Jong-shin)	2012	Eliminated
2	Park Si-hwan	"넌 또 다른 나 (You Are Another Me)" (Lee Seung-chul)	2003	Safe
3	Jang Won-gi	"환생 (Reincarnation)" (Yoon Jong-shin)	1996	Safe
4	Park Jae-jung	"Annie" (Yoon Jong-shin)	2000	Safe
5	Kim Min-ji	"비애 (Sorrow)" (DJ DOC)	2000	Safe
6	Song Hee Jin	"떠나지마 (Please Don't Leave)" (Lee Seung-chul)	2006	Safe
7	Im Soon-young	"위로 (Consolation)" (하림)	2004	Eliminated
8	Jang Won-gi	"영영 (Forever)" (Na Hoon-a)	1990	Safe

In contrast to previous elimination stages, the contestant whom was eliminated was determined by a final performance from the two contestants who had received the lowest votes; with judges making the final decision on who would proceed to the Final 5.

=== Top 5 – Public Requests ===
For this round, the contestant chose a song from a number of requests made by the public on a message forum.

Order	Contestant	Song (original artist)	Year	Result
1	Kim Min-ji	"Rain Drop" (IU)	2010	Safe
2	Song Hee Jin	"Firework" (Katy Perry)	2010	Safe
3	Jang Won-gi	"미소천사 (Smiling Angel)" (Sung Si-kyung)	2001	Eliminated
4	Park Jae-jung	"추억 속의 그대 (Inside Your Memories)" (Hwang Chi-hoon)	1988	Safe
5	Park Si-hwan	"발걸음 (Footsteps)" (에메랄드 캐슬)	1994	Safe
6	Kim Min-ji	"Just the Way You Are" (Bruno Mars)	2010	Safe
7	Jang Won-gi	"수요일엔 빨간 장미를 (Bright Red Roses Of Wednesday)" (다섯손가락)	1985	Eliminated

=== Top 4 – Music from Legends ===
Order	Contestant	Song (original artist)	Year	Result
1	Park Si-hwan	"불놀이야 (It's Playing with Fire)" (옥슨 80)	1980	Safe
2	Kim Min-ji	"사랑 사랑 사랑 (Love Love Love)" (Kim Hyun-sik)	1991	Eliminated
3	Park Jae-jung	"시간 (Time)" (Kim Do-hyang)	2005	Safe
4	Song Hee Jin	" 마지막 사랑 (Last Love)" (Park Ki Young)	1999	Safe

=== Top 3 – Song Rendition / Rival Mission ===
As well as having to rendition several songs, each contestant also faced off against one another in a rival-style competition for this round.

Order	Contestant	Song (original artist)	Year	Result
1	Park Si-hwan	"물어본다 (I Ask)" (Lee Seung-hwan)	2004	Safe
2	Park Jae-jung	"가까이 와봐 (Come Closer)" (Lee Seung-chul)	1999	Safe
3	Song Hee Jin	"이유같지 않은 이유 (Unreasonable Reason)" (Park Mi-Kyung)	1994	Eliminated

=== Top 2 – Own Song Choices / New Song ===
Each contestant was free to choose which songs to sing for this round. Additionally, each singer was given a song that had been specifically produced for them.

Order	Contestant	Song (original artist)	Year	Result
1	Park Jae-Jung	"사랑한다는 말 (Saying I Love You)" (Kim Dong-ryool)	2001	Winner
2	Park Si-hwan	"그날들 (The Days)" (Kim Kwang-seok)	1996	Runner-Up
3	Park Jae-Jung	"Mirotic" (TVXQ)	2008	Winner
4	Park Si-hwan	"흐린 기억속의 그대 (Yon inside my unclear memory)" (Hyun Jin-young)	1992	Runner-Up
5	Park Si-hwan	"내 사람 (My Love)" (Park Si-hwan)	2013	Runner-Up
6	Park Jae-jung	"첫 눈에 (At First Sight)" (Park Jae-jung)	2013	Winner

== Television Ratings ==
- AGB Nielsen Media Research

Episode	Original Broadcast Date	National Viewership (Changes in Percentage)
1	August 9, 2013	4.9%
2	August 16, 2013	5.9%(+1.0)
3	August 23, 2013	6.8%(+0.9)
4	August 30, 2013	5.7%(-1.1)
5	September 6, 2013	4.8%(-0.9)
6	September 13, 2013	6.2%(+1.4)
7	September 20, 2013	4.0%(-2.2)
8	September 27, 2013	4.4%(+0.4)
9	October 4, 2013	5.0%(+0.6)
10	October 11, 2013	3.7%(-1.3)
11	October 18, 2013	2.9%(-0.8)
12	October 25, 2013	2.3%(-0.6)
13	November 1, 2013	2.0%(-0.3)
14	November 8, 2013	2.0%(0)
15	November 15, 2013	1.7%(-0.3)
