= Superstar K 2016 =

- Season 2016
- Hosted by: Kim Sung-joo
- Judges: Kim Bum-soo; Gummy; Gil Seong-joon; Kim Yeon-woo; Brave Brothers; Ailee; Han Sung-ho (CEO FNC Entertainment)
- Winner: Kim Young Geun
- Runner-up: Lee Ji Eun
- Finals venue: CJ E&M Center Multi-studio

Release
- Original network: Mnet; tvN; Mnet Japan
- Original release: September 22 – December 8, 2016

Season chronology
- ← Previous; Superstar K 7

Superstar K 2016 (Korean: 슈퍼스타 K 2016) is the eighth season of the South Korean television talent show series Superstar K, which premiered on 22 September 2016 on Mnet and aired Thursday nights at 9:40PM KST. Eliminations are determined in every episode, based on text message votes and online votes that are open to the entire public. The winner of Superstar K 2016, Kim Young-geun, won 500,000,000 won (US$470,990). This was the last season of the show to be produced, due to much lower viewership ratings than in past seasons. Kim Bum-soo returned as a judge. This season saw the addition of Gummy, Gil Seong-joon, Kim Yeon-woo, Brave Brothers, Ailee, and Han Sung-ho. This was the largest lineup of judges in the show's history, totaling 7.

This is the first season to be produced by Signal Entertainment Group for Mnet due to the 2 billion won contract between the former and Mnet's owners CJ E&M in May 2016. Signal was the production company behind the Mnet programs Produce 101 and I Can See Your Voice.

== Broadcasting time ==
=== Broadcast ===
Network	Broadcasting Dates	Broadcasting Time
Mnet · tvN	September 22 – December 8, 2016	Every Thursday at 9:40 PM (KST)

== Finalists ==
=== TOP 10 ===
- Jinwon (ko)
- Jo Min Wook
- Corona
- Lee Ji Eun
- Lee Sarah
- Yoo Da Bin
- Park Hye-won
- Kim Ye Sung
- Dong Woo Seok
- Kim Young Geun

=== Elimination chart ===
Contestant	Episode 9	Episode 10	Episode 11	Episode oo
Kim Young Geun	SAFE	SAFE	SAFE	WINNER
Lee Ji Eun	SAFE	SAFE	SAFE	RUNNER-UP
Park Hye Won	SAFE	SAFE	Eliminated	
Jo Min Wook	SAFE	SAFE	Eliminated	
Corona	SAFE	Eliminated		
Lee Sarah	SAFE	Eliminated		
Dong Woo Seok	SAFE	Eliminated		
Kim Ye Sung	Eliminated			
Yoo Da Bin	Eliminated			
Jinwon	Eliminated			

== Finals ==
=== TOP 10 - First Stage (November 17, 2016) ===
- Judges Score 50% + Population Votes 40% + Online Pre Votes 10%

==== Performance ====
Order	Contestant	Song (original artist)	Judges Score							Judges Score Average
Order	Contestant	Song (original artist)	Ailee	Brave Brother	Kim Yeon Woo	Han Seong Ho	Kim Bum Soo	GUMMY	GILL	Judges Score Average
1	Park Hye Won	Yoon Bok-hee - Move	99	95	98	90	95	98	82	94
2	Lee Sarah	Frederic Weatherly - Danny Boy	90	80	86	88	79	84	74	83
3	Kim Ye Sung	Bulnabang Star Sausage Club - In Mud	79	77	83	78	85	79	66	78
4	Lee Ji Eun	Kim Hyun-sik - Went Away	94	90	98	89	92	92	80	91
5	Dong Woo Seok	Jung Joon-young - Spotless Mind	89	84	93	78	83	80	77	83
6	Yoo Da Bin	Lee So-ra - Track9	81	78	94	83	84	83	72	82
7	Jo Min Wook	Han Dong-geun - Amazing You	93	90	95	87	89	88	70	87
8	Corona	g.o.d - One Candle	97	94	94	85	91	93	78	90
9	Jinwon	V.One - Shaving	74	72	92	79	78	77	65	77
10	Kim Young Geun	Han Dae-soo - To Happy World	92	89	93	87	93	89	78	89

==== Results ====
Rank	Order	Contestant	Judges Score	Population + Online Score	Sum Score	Result
1	4	Lee Ji Eun	635	696	1331	TOP 7
2	10	Kim Young Geun	621	675	1296	TOP 7
3	2	Park Hye Won	657	597	1254	TOP 7
4	7	Jo Min Wook	612	618	1230	TOP 7
5	1	Corona	632	592	1224	TOP 7
6	3	Lee Sarah	581	559	1140	TOP 7
7	5	Dong Woo Seok	584	538	1122	TOP 7
8	3	Kim Ye Sung	547	505	1052	Eliminated
9	6	Yoo Da Bin	575	476	1051	Eliminated
10	9	Jinwon	537	439	976	Eliminated

=== TOP 7 - Judge's Mission (November 24, 2016) ===
- Judges Score 50% + SMS Votes 45% + Online Pre Votes 5%

==== Performance ====
Order	Contestant	Producer	Song (original artist)	Judges Score							Judges Score Average
Order	Contestant	Producer	Song (original artist)	Ailee	Brave Brother	Kim Yeon Woo	Han Seong Ho	Kim Bum Soo	GUMMY	GILL	Judges Score Average
1	Corona	Brave Brother	Nell - Time Spent Walking Through Memories	90		90	87	87	89	84	88
2	Park Hye Won	Ailee	Boohwal - Lonely Night		90	87	90	94	91	89	90
3	Lee Sarah	Han Seong Ho	Poet and Village Headmaster - Thorn Tree	85	86	85		82	87	79	84
4	Kim Young Geun	GILL	WoongSan - I Sing the Blue	93	89	93	92	96	95		93
5	Dong Woo Seok	Kim Bum Soo	Mate - Fly To The Sky	87	85	88	80		87	86	86
6	Jo Min Wook	Kim Yeon Woo	Yim Jae-beom - The Flight	87	88		85	92	89	86	88
7	Lee Ji Eun	GUMMY	Jessie J - Bang Bang	91	91	93	92	98		90	93

==== Results ====
Rank	Order	Contestant	Judges Score	SMS + Online Score	Sum Score	Result
1	4	Kim Young Geun	558	596	1154	TOP 4
2	6	Jo Min Wook	527	560	1087	TOP 4
3	7	Lee Ji Eun	555	529	1084	TOP 4
4	2	Park Hye Won	541	489	1030	TOP 4
5	1	Corona	527	460	987	Eliminated
6	3	Lee Sarah	513	423	936	Eliminated
7	5	Dong Woo Seok	504	387	891	Eliminated

=== TOP 4 - My Style by Kim Gun-mo (December 1, 2016) ===
- Judges Score 50% + SMS Votes 45% + Online Pre Votes 5%

==== Performance ====
Order	Contestant	Song (original artist)	Judges Score							Judges Score Average
Order	Contestant	Song (original artist)	Ailee	Brave Brother	Kim Yeon Woo	Han Seong Ho	Kim Bum Soo	GUMMY	GILL	Judges Score Average
1	Jo Min Wook	Kim Gun-mo - Beautiful Goodbye	89	80	94	85	93	85	84	87
2	Kim Young Geun	Kim Gun-mo - I Owe It All To You	95	89	94	92	91	91	88	91
3	Lee Ji Eun	Kim Gun-mo - SINGER	93	95	96	94	98	93	86	94
4	Park Hye Won	Kim Gun-mo - I'm Sorry	89	84	95	91	91	92	82	89

- TOP4 Special Stage: Jo Min Wook + Kim Young Geun + Lee Ji Eun + Park Hye Won : "Park Gwang-hyun and Kim Gun-mo - Together"

==== Results ====
Rank	Order	Contestant	Judges Score	SMS + Online Score	Sum Score	Result
1	2	Kim Young Geun	640	699	1339	FINAL
2	3	Lee Ji Eun	655	610	1265	FINAL
3	4	Park Hye Won	624	517	1141	Eliminated
4	1	Jo Min Wook	610	428	1038	Eliminated

=== FINAL (December 8, 2016) ===
- Judges Score 50% + SMS Votes 45% + Online Pre Votes 5%

==== Performance ====
Order	Contestant	First song (Special Stage)	Special Stage Featuring	Order	Second song (Final Stage)	Judges Score							Judges Score Average
Order	Contestant	First song (Special Stage)	Special Stage Featuring	Order	Second song (Final Stage)	Ailee	Brave Brother	Kim Yeon Woo	Han Seong Ho	Kim Bum Soo	GUMMY	GILL	Judges Score Average
1	Kim Young Geun	Crush (Feat. Gaeko) - Hug Me	Gaeko	4	Lim Jae Wook (Position) - I Sarang (Ost. The City Hall)	94	93	96	96	98	98	92	95
2	Lee Ji Eun	Deulgukhwa - Till the Morning Comes	Yoo Sung-Eun	3	Park Hyo-shin - Breath	90	93	98	93	96	98	90	94

- TOP2 Special Stage: Kim Young Geun + Lee Ji Eun : "Lee Moon-se - Farewell My Love"
- TOP10&Kim Bum-soo&Kim Yeon-woo Special Stage: Jinwon + Jo Min Wook + Corona + Lee Ji Eun + Lee Sarah + Yoo Da Bin + Park Hye Won + Kim Ye Sung + Dong Woo Seok + Kim Young Geun + Kim Bum-soo + Kim Yeon-woo : "NOW N NEW Various Artists - 하나되어"

==== Results ====
Rank	Order	Contestant	Online	Judges Score	SMS + Online Score	Sum Score	Result
1	1	Kim Young Geun	58.4%	667	700	1367	WINNER
2	2	Lee Ji Eun	41.6%	658	567	1225	RUNNER-UP

== Discography ==
Year	Title	Contestant	Peak chart positions	Sales	Album
Year	Title	Contestant	KOR	Sales	Album
2016	탈진 (Exhausted)	Kim Young Geun	30	KOR: 164498+	SuperStarK 2016 #1
2016	너의 손 잡고 (Holding Your Hand)	Corona	-	KOR: -	SuperStarK 2016 #1
2016	Lay Me Down	Kim Young Geun	-	KOR: -	SuperStarK 2016 Kim Young Geun - Lay Me Down
2016	Catch The Star	Youngja Dolim	-	KOR: -	SuperStarK 2016 #2
2016	오늘도 (Today)	Junhyuk Park	-	KOR: -	SuperStarK 2016 #2
2016	고칠게 (I'm Gona Change)	Jinwon	-	KOR: -	SuperStarK 2016 #2
2016	Lost	Choi Solji	-	KOR: -	SuperStarK 2016 #3
2016	바보처럼 살았군요 (Lived Like a Fool)	Kim Young Geun	-	KOR: -	SuperStarK 2016 #4
2016	옛사랑 (Old Love)	Lee Sarah	-	KOR: -	SuperStarK 2016 #4
2016	사랑 그렇게 보내네 (Farewell My Love)	Kim Ye Sung, Lee Ji Eun	22	KOR: 88,319+	SuperStarK 2016 #5
2016	퇴근버스 (Commuting Bus)	Jo Min Wook, Park Hye Won	-	KOR: -	SuperStarK 2016 #5
2016	Shine	Corona, Lee Sarah	-	KOR: -	SuperStarK 2016 #6
2016	Break Down	Kim Ye Sung, Kim Young Geun	-	KOR: -	SuperStarK 2016 #7
2016	빈 고백 (Empty Confession)	Jinwon, Park Hye Won	-	KOR: -	SuperStarK 2016 #7
2016	그대 없는 거리 (Boulevards Without You)	Lee Ji Eun	-	KOR: -	SuperStarK 2016 #8
2016	Stand Up For You	Park Hye Won	-	KOR: -	SuperStarK 2016 #8
2016	집으로 오는 길 (On The Way Back Home)	Kim Young Geun	-	KOR: -	SuperStarK 2016 Kim Young Geun - On The Way Back Home
2016	병이에요 (Spotless Mind)	Dong Woo Seok	-	KOR: -	SuperStarK 2016 TOP10
2016	Track 9	Yoo Da Bin	-	KOR: -	SuperStarK 2016 TOP10
2016	촛불하 (One Candle)	Corona	-	KOR: -	SuperStarK 2016 TOP10
2016	면도 (Shaving)	Jinwon	-	KOR: -	SuperStarK 2016 TOP10
2016	행복의 나라 (To Happy World)	Kim Young Geun	-	KOR: -	SuperStarK 2016 TOP10
2016	노래 (Move)	Park Hye Won	-	KOR: -	SuperStarK 2016 TOP10
2016	Danny Boy	Lee Sarah	-	KOR: -	SuperStarK 2016 TOP10
2016	뻘밭에서 (In Mud)	Kim Ye Sung	-	KOR: -	SuperStarK 2016 TOP10
2016	떠나가 버렸네 (Went Away)	Lee Ji Eun	-	KOR: -	SuperStarK 2016 TOP10
2016	Lonely Night	Park Hye Won	-	KOR: -	SuperStarK 2016 TOP7
2016	가시나무 (Thorn Tree)	Lee Sarah	-	KOR: -	SuperStarK 2016 TOP7
2016	I Sing The Blues	Kim Young Geun	-	KOR: -	SuperStarK 2016 TOP7
2016	Bang Bang	Lee Ji Eun	-	KOR: -	SuperStarK 2016 TOP7
2016	SINGER	Lee Ji Eun	-	KOR: -	SuperStarK 2016 TOP4
2016	아름다운 이별 (Beautiful Goodbye)	Jo Min Wook	-	KOR: -	SuperStarK 2016 TOP4
2016	이사랑 (이사랑 버리자) [ I Sarang (I Sarang Beorija) ]	Kim Young Geun	-	KOR: -	SuperStarK 2016 FINAL

== Ratings ==
In the ratings below, the highest rating for the show will be in red and the lowest rating for the show will be in blue.

Episode	Rounds	Air date	tvN		Mnet	
Episode	Rounds	Air date	AGB ratings	TNms ratings	AGB ratings	TNms ratings
1	20-Second Battle	September 22, 2016	2.0%	1.5%	0.8%	1.4%
2	20-Second Battle	September 29, 2016	1.8%	1.9%	0.6%	1.4%
3	20-Second Battle	October 6, 2016	1.6%	1.3%	0.5%	0.5%
4	Battle Point Out	October 13, 2016	1.7%	1.3%	0.5%	0.8%
5	Battle Point Out	October 20, 2016	1.5%	1.2%	0.6%	0.7%
6	2vs2	October 27, 2016	1.1%	1.1%	0.7%	0.7%
7	Double Final Mission	November 3, 2016	1.2%	1.0%	0.7%	0.5%
8	Solo mission	November 10, 2016	1.9%	1.4%	0.6%	0.6%
9	TOP10	November 17, 2016	1.5%	1.1%	0.7%	0.5%
10	Live TOP7	November 24, 2016	1.7%	1.1%	NR	NR
11	Live TOP4	December 1, 2016	1.4%	0.9%	0.5%	0.5%
12	Live FINAL	December 8, 2016	1.2%	0.8%	0.5%	0.5%

- Note that the show airs on a cable channel (pay TV), which plays part in its slower uptake and relatively small audience share when compared to programs broadcast (FTA) on public networks such as KBS, SBS, MBC or EBS.
- NR rating means "not reported". The rating is low.
