= Signal Entertainment Group =

South Korean company

Signal Entertainment Group Corp.
- Native name: 주식회사 씨그널엔터테인먼트그룹
- Type: Public
- Traded as: KRX: 099830
- Industry: Entertainment, media, information & communication, technology
- Founded: January 18, 1991, as Signal Information & Communication Corp.
- Headquarters: Yangjae-daero 1498, Gangdong-gu, Seoul; Banpo-daero 20-gil 29, Seocho-gu, Seoul, South Korea
- Area served: South Korea
- Key people: Kim Jung-sang (CEO)
- Products: Music albums, films, K-pop products, technological equipment, beauty products
- Services: Production, broadcasting, distribution, partnerships
- Subsidiaries: Better ENT (60%); Jungle Entertainment (100%); L&Holdings (100%); NH Media (50%)
- Website: sicis.co.kr, signal-ent.com

Signal Entertainment Group Corp. (Korean: 주식회사 씨그널엔터테인먼트그룹), founded in 1991, is a South Korean company specializing in show business, media and entertainment content, cosmetics and information technology.

== History ==
Founded in 1991 as Signal Information & Communication Corp. (Korean: 주식회사 씨그널정보통신) (Signal I&C), the company was the national licensee of the now-defunct American company Motorola. In 1997, it partnered with the now-defunct Korea Telecom Freetel (a Korea Telecom (KT) company) for PCS service.

1999 was the year when Signal I&C became the official distributor of Motorola Multimedia Group Cable Services. It also partnered with KT for PCS service. Signal I&C got the ISO 9001 certification in this same year.

In 2001, Signal I&C signed a business partnership with Lucent (now Alcatel-Lucent), then partnered with SK Telecom for IMT Advanced service.

In 2003, the company signed another business partnership with CommWorks Corporation (then a subsidiary of now-defunct 3Com, presently a subsidiary of UTStarcom). Later on, it partnered again with KT for ATM service.

It joined the Korea Exchange (KRX)'s KOSDAQ index in 2011.

2015 was the start of a new era for the company as it launched its present corporate name - then started to diversify into show business, media and cosmetics.

== Mergers and acquisitions ==
=== 2014 ===
- Unione I&M (Korean: 유니원아이앤엠) was a television production company, founded in 2005. As of today, it is now a division by name of Signal.

=== 2015 ===
- Better ENT (Korean: 더좋은이엔티), formerly Storm S Company (Korean: 스톰에스컴퍼니), is a talent agency founded by actor Song Seung-heon in 2009.
- Big Hit Entertainment (Korean: 빅히트 엔터테인먼트) is a recording label founded by Bang Si-hyuk in 2005. In early 2016, BigHit ended their stake relationship with Signal Entertainment Group. BigHit issued a 6 billion won convertible bond Signal Entertainment Group in 2015. After a year, Signal Entertainment Group made a full settlement of the bonds.
- Jungle Entertainment (Korean: 정글 엔터테인먼트) is a recording label founded by Tiger JK in 2006.
- Skinanniversary Co. Ltd. (Korean: 주식회사 스킨애니버셔리) is a skin care company and the operator of the Skinanniversary Beauty Town in Paju, Gyeonggi Province. It was founded in 2007.
- S Box Media Company (Korean: 에스박스미디어컴퍼니) is a television production company and talent agency, founded in 2012.

=== 2016 ===
- L&Holdings (Korean: 엘앤홀딩스) is a holding company of four talent agencies: Great Company (Korean: 크다컴퍼니), L&Company (Korean: 엘앤컴퍼니), Star Camp 202 (Korean: 스타캠프202) and JR ENT (Korean: 제이알이엔티).
- NH Media (Korean: 앤에이취미디어) is a recording label founded by Kim Nam-hee in 1998.

== Productions ==
=== Television ===
==== Variety, reality and talk ====
- The Body Show (OnStyle, 2015–present)
- I Can See Your Voice (Mnet, 2015–present)
- Please Take Care of My Refrigerator (JTBC, 2014–present)
- Produce 101 (Mnet, 2016)
- The Secret Readers Club (O tvN/tvN, 2015–present)
- Superstar K (Mnet, 2016–present)
  - Superstar K 2016

==== Drama ====
Year	Title	Network	Notes
2015	Songgot: The Piercer	JTBC	
2015	The Ace	SBS TV	
2016	Babysitter+	KBS 2TV	
2017	Innocent Defendant	SBS TV	co-produced with The Story Works
2017	My Oppa Agent, 《我的特工欧巴》	No release information	Chinese-Korean co-production with Showmax and Fool Pictures
2017–2020	Stranger	tvN	co-produced with IOK Media developed by Studio Dragon
2017	Girls' Generation 1979	KBS 2TV	co-produced with FNC Add Culture
2017	Han Yeo-reum's Memory	JTBC	TV movie co-produced with AM Studio
2018	Life	JTBC	co-produced with AM Studio
2018	Bad Papa*	MBC TV	co-produced with Hoga Entertainment

* produced under subsidiary Signal Pictures
+ produced under subsidiary L&Holdings

== Artists ==
- Choi Song-hyun
- Jin Tae-hyun

=== L&Holdings ===
Great Company

- Kang Sung-yeon
- Jung Seong-woo
- Shim Yi-young
- Yang Jung-a

L&Company

- Yoo Gun

Star Camp 202

- Shin Da-eun

JR ENT

- Nam Sang-mi
- Song Seon-mi

=== S Box Media Company ===
- Lee Sang-hoon
