= Songgot: The Piercer =

2015 South Korean television series

- Promotional poster
- Hangul: 송곳
- RR: Songgot
- MR: Songgot
- Genre: Drama
- Based on: Awl by Choi Kyu-seok
- Written by: Lee Nam-gyu; Kim Soo-jin
- Directed by: Kim Seok-yoon
- Starring: Ji Hyun-woo; Ahn Nae-sang
- Ending theme: "Yell" by Park Si-hwan
- Country of origin: South Korea
- Original language: Korean
- No. of episodes: 12

Production
- Running time: 80 minutes
- Production company: Signal Entertainment Group

Original release
- Network: JTBC
- Release: October 24 – November 29, 2015

Related
- Cart (2014)

Songgot: The Piercer (Korean: 송곳; lit. 'Awl') is a 2015 South Korean television series starring Ji Hyun-woo and Ahn Nae-sang. Based on the webtoon Awl by Choi Kyu-seok, which itself is derived from a true story that occurred in 2007, related to the E-Land Group, the series aired on JTBC from October 24 to November 29, 2015.

== Synopsis ==
At the retail market where he works, Lee Soo-in (Ji Hyun-woo) is ordered by his boss to fire temporary employees. Finding the situation unfair, Lee Soo-in joins the labor union and starts fighting back along with other employees.

== Cast ==
=== Main ===
- Ji Hyun-woo as Lee Soo-in
- Ahn Nae-sang as Goo Go-shin

=== Supporting ===
- Hyun Woo as Joo Kang-min
- Park Si-hwan as Nam Dong-hyup
- Baek Hyun-joo as Han Young-sil
- Lee Bong-ryun as Mi-ran
- Lee Jung-eun as Kim Jung-mi
- Yesung as Hwang Joon-chul
- Hwang Jung-min as Hwang Jung-min
- Yoon Bo-hyun as Seo Min-ho
- Shin Yeon-sook as Joon-geum
- Jo Jae-ryong as Section chief Heo
- Ahn Sang-woo as Section chief Yoon
- Kim Joong-ki as Section chief Kim
- Kim Hee-won as Jung Min-chul
- Kim Ga-eun as Moon So-jin
- Kim Hee-chang as Cha Sung-hak
- Gong Jung-hwan as Go Jin-hee
- Moon Ji-yoon as Lee Tae-kyung

=== Special appearances ===
- Baek Eun-hye as Contact employee
- Lee Jae-yong as Lee Soo-in's homeroom teacher (Ep. 1)
- Park Hyuk-kwon as Refunded customer (Ep. 1)
- Choi Moo-sung as Lee Soo-in's father (Ep. 1)
- Choi Yong-min as Sergeant major Oh (Ep. 2)
- Go Soo-hee as Han Da-ye (Ep. 9)
- Lee Hye-sung as Ha Do-gang (Ep. 9)
- Lee Sun-ok as Lee Sun-ok (Ep. 9)
- Im Sung-eon as Lee Soo-in's wife (Ep. 10, 12)
- Cho Sang-geon as Dawon Enterprise's CEO (Ep. 12)
- Hong Ji-min as Hong Ji-min (Ep. 12)
- Lee Jong-soo as Office worker (Ep. 12)
- Shim Hee-sub as Lee Nak-gu (Ep. 12)

== Original soundtrack ==
Songgot: The Piercer OST

Soundtrack album by Various Artists
- Released: 2015
- Genre: Soundtrack
- Languages: Korean; English
- Label: Sony Music
- Producers: Roy Entertainment; SM Entertainment

=== Part 1 ===
Released on October 25, 2015
No.	Title	Artist	Length
1.	"Yell" (외쳐본다)	Park Si-hwan	4:22
2.	"Yell" (Inst.)		4:22
Total length:			8:44

=== Part 2 ===
Released on November 8, 2015
No.	Title	Artist	Length
1.	"Miss You" (너무 그립다)	Yesung (Super Junior)	3:42
2.	"Miss You" (Inst.)		3:42
Total length:			7:24

=== Part 3 ===
Released on November 22, 2015
No.	Title	Artist	Length
1.	"My Man" (내 사람)	Kim Yeon-ji	4:40
2.	"My Man" (Inst.)		4:40
Total length:			9:20

== Ratings ==
In this table, the blue numbers represent the lowest ratings and the red numbers represent the highest ratings.

Ep.	Original broadcast date	Average audience share	
Ep.	Original broadcast date	AGB Nielsen	TNmS
1	October 24, 2015	2.194%	1.7%
2	October 25, 2015	1.954%	1.9%
3	October 31, 2015	1.372%	1.6%
4	November 1, 2015	1.508%	1.8%
5	November 7, 2015	1.480%	2.3%
6	November 8, 2015	1.409%	1.7%
7	November 14, 2015	1.432%	1.6%
8	November 15, 2015	1.271%	1.8%
9	November 21, 2015	1.341%	1.5%
10	November 22, 2015	1.582%	1.7%
11	November 28, 2015	1.389%	1.1%
12	November 29, 2015	1.964%	1.7%
Average		1.575%	1.7%

- This drama airs on a cable channel/pay TV which normally has a relatively smaller audience compared to free-to-air TV/public broadcasters (KBS, SBS, MBC and EBS).

== Awards and nominations ==
Year	Award	Category	Recipient	Result	Ref.
2015	JTBC Awards	Best Actor	Ji Hyun-woo	Won	
