= Brad Ausmus =

American baseball player and manager (born 1969)

- Ausmus with the New York Yankees in 2025

Houston Astros – No. 12
- Catcher / Manager
- Born: April 14, 1969 (age 57); New Haven, Connecticut, U.S.
- Batted: Right Threw: Right

MLB debut
- July 28, 1993, for the San Diego Padres

Last MLB appearance
- October 3, 2010, for the Los Angeles Dodgers

MLB statistics
- Batting average: .251
- Home runs: 80
- Runs batted in: 607
- Managerial record: 386–422
- Winning %: .478
- Stats at Baseball Reference
- Managerial record at Baseball Reference

Teams
- As player: San Diego Padres (1993–1996); Detroit Tigers (1996); Houston Astros (1997–1998); Detroit Tigers (1999–2000); Houston Astros (2001–2008); Los Angeles Dodgers (2009–2010); As manager: Detroit Tigers (2014–2017); Los Angeles Angels (2019); As coach: Oakland Athletics (2022); New York Yankees (2024–2026)

Career highlights and awards
- All Star (1999); 3× Gold Glove Award (2001, 2002, 2006)

Bradley David Ausmus (/ˈɔːsməs/; born April 14, 1969) is an American professional baseball manager, and former player and coach, who is the manager for the Houston Astros of Major League Baseball (MLB). In his 18-year MLB playing career, Ausmus played as a catcher for the San Diego Padres, Detroit Tigers, Houston Astros, and Los Angeles Dodgers. He also managed the Tigers, Los Angeles Angels, and Israeli national baseball team and was a coach for the Oakland Athletics and New York Yankees.

A 1987 draft pick of the Yankees, Ausmus chose to alternate between attending Dartmouth College and playing minor league baseball. Ausmus then had an 18-year major league playing career with the Padres, Tigers, Astros, and Dodgers. During his playing days he was an All Star in 1999, a three-time Gold Glove Award winner (2001, 2002, and 2006), and won the 2007 Darryl Kile Award "for integrity and courage". A five-time league-leader at catcher in fielding percentage, Ausmus led the league twice each in range factor and in percentage caught stealing, and once each in putouts and assists.

Ausmus finished his playing career in 2010 ranked third in major league history with 12,839 putouts as a catcher (trailing only Iván Rodríguez and Jason Kendall), seventh in games caught with 1,938, and 10th in both range factor/game (7.12) and fielding percentage (.994). He also ranked first all-time among all Jewish major leaguers in career games played (1,971), fifth in hits (1,579), and tenth in runs batted in (607) as of 2024. He was inducted into the National Jewish Sports Hall of Fame in 2004.

Ausmus worked in the Padres' front office as a special assistant from 2010 to 2013. In November 2013, Ausmus became the 38th manager in the history of the Detroit Tigers, succeeding Jim Leyland, a position he held for four years. In October 2018, he was named the 17th manager in the history of the Los Angeles Angels, but was dismissed after one season in September 2019. In January 2022, he was named the bench coach of the Oakland Athletics. Ausmus managed Team Israel in 2013 and in the 2026 World Baseball Classic, and was a coach for Team Israel under manager Ian Kinsler when it competed in the 2023 World Baseball Classic. He joined the Yankees as their bench coach after the 2023 season.

== Early life ==
Ausmus is Jewish, and was born in New Haven, Connecticut. His mother, Linda Susan (née Dronsick), was Jewish, and his father, Harry Jack Ausmus, was Protestant. His father is a retired professor of European history at Southern Connecticut State University, and the author of A Schopenhauerian Critique of Nietzsche's Thought, which Ausmus calls his "favorite book."

Ausmus' mother was raised in a Jewish household, and he said in an interview that those values were instilled in him. He takes pride in his heritage. Ausmus stated in an interview with the Jewish Journal: "I wasn't raised with the Jewish religion, so in that sense I don't really have much feeling toward it. But, however, in the last 10 or so years, I have had quite a few young Jewish boys who will tell me that I am their favorite player or they love watching me play or they feel like baseball is a good fit... I'm all for it."

=== High school ===
Ausmus was a star in baseball at Cheshire High School; as a freshman he was a teammate of National Hockey League defenseman Brian Leetch, who was then a pitcher on the school's Connecticut state championship team in 1984. As a sophomore Ausmus played shortstop and batted .327. As a junior (when his coach moved him to catcher) he hit .436, and as a senior he hit .411 and was named the Cheshire Area High School Player of the Year. He was named to the All-State team both his junior and senior years.

Ausmus was also a standout athlete in high school as a basketball guard.

Academically, Ausmus scored a 1220 on his SAT exam.

=== Draft and college ===
The New York Yankees selected Ausmus in the 48th round of the 1987 Major League Baseball draft. He declined to sign with the Yankees so that he could attend Dartmouth College, until the Yankees allowed him to attend classes during the baseball offseason. (Dartmouth has a quartered academic calendar, which allowed Ausmus some flexibility.) Given NCAA rules barring paid professional athletes from playing college sports, Ausmus could not play for the Dartmouth Big Green, and instead served the team as a volunteer coach and bullpen catcher.

Ausmus graduated in 1991 with a Bachelor of Arts in government, and was a member of Chi Gamma Epsilon fraternity and the Sphinx Senior Society. While at Dartmouth, the lowest grade Ausmus received was a B. College graduates are uncommon in major league baseball, with only 26 players and managers with four-year degrees in 2009. In 2005, Ausmus became the first Ivy League catcher to play in the World Series since Dartmouth's Chief Meyers in 1916. Ausmus was also one of six Ivy Leaguers on major league rosters at the beginning of the 2009 season. In 2010, The Sporting News named him the ninth-smartest athlete in sports.

Though Ausmus was not drafted until the 48th round of the 1987 draft, he played in MLB longer than any of the 1,150 players drafted ahead of him did.

== Playing career ==
=== Minor leagues (1988–93) ===
Ausmus spent five years in the Yankees' minor league system with the Gulf Coast Yankees (1988), Oneonta Yankees (1988–89), Prince William Cannons (1990–91), Albany-Colonie Yankees (1991–92), and Columbus Clippers (1992). He was subsequently selected by the Colorado Rockies with the 54th pick of the 1992 MLB expansion draft. He played for the Colorado Springs Sky Sox in 1993.

=== San Diego Padres (1993–96) ===
The Rockies traded Ausmus with Andy Ashby and Doug Bochtler to the San Diego Padres for Bruce Hurst and Greg Harris in July 1993. He made his major league debut two days later, when he started for the Padres against the Chicago Cubs, and had a single in three at bats. In 1995 Ausmus batted .293, a career best, and stole 16 bases (the most by any catcher since Craig Biggio stole 19 in 1991).

In June 1996, after 149 at bats in which he batted just .181, the Padres traded Ausmus, Andújar Cedeño, and minor leaguer Russ Spear to the Detroit Tigers for John Flaherty and Chris Gomez.

Ausmus ranks in the top 7 among catchers in Padres history in games played, hits, runs, and stolen bases.

=== Detroit Tigers (1996) ===
Ausmus batted .248 for the Tigers in 1996.

In December 1996, the Tigers traded Ausmus to the Houston Astros along with José Lima, Trever Miller, C. J. Nitkowski, and Daryle Ward for Doug Brocail, Brian Hunter, Todd Jones, Orlando Miller, and cash.

=== Houston Astros (1997–98) ===
In January 1999, the Astros traded Ausmus and Nitkowski to the Tigers for Paul Bako, Dean Crow, Brian Powell, and minor leaguers Carlos Villalobos and Mark Persails.

=== Detroit Tigers (1999–2000) ===
Generally considered light-hitting but sure-handed, Ausmus had his best offensive season in 1999 at the age of 30, when he batted .275 and set career highs in on-base percentage (.365) and slugging percentage (.415), and made the All-Star team. He was hit by pitches 14 times, sixth in the league and a career high. Ausmus batted leadoff for the Tigers seven times, the first catcher since Bruce Kimm in 1976 to do so.

=== Houston Astros (2001–08) ===
In December 2000, the Tigers traded Ausmus, Doug Brocail, and Nelson Cruz to the Houston Astros for Roger Cedeño, Chris Holt, and Mitch Meluskey.

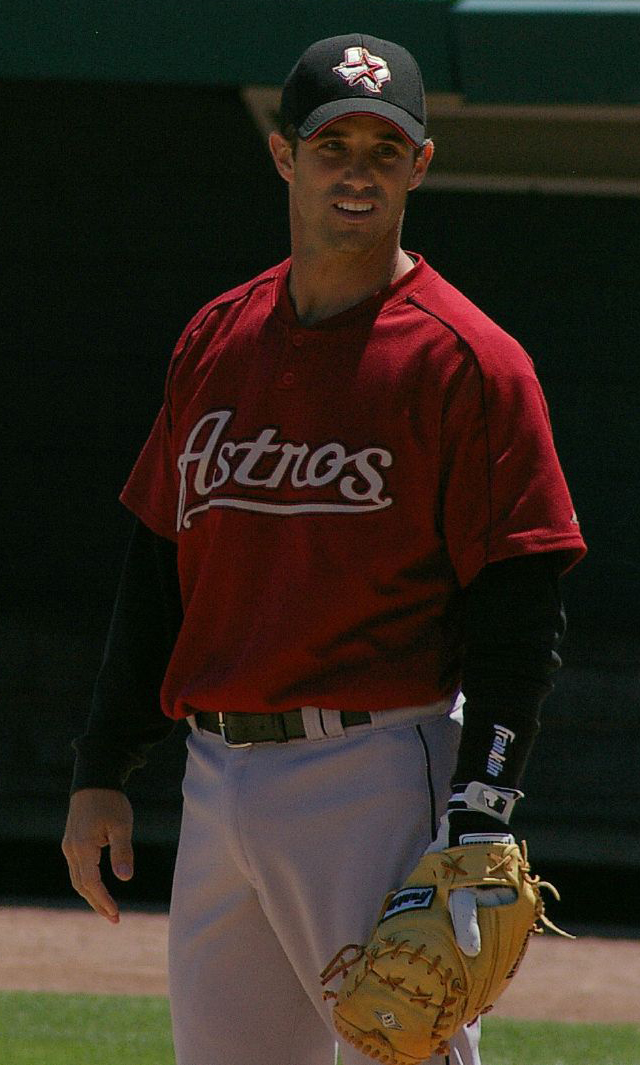
Ausmus with the Houston Astros in 2006

In November 2003, he re-signed as a free agent with the Astros. In 2004, he batted .308 against left-handers, and .364 in situations that were "late and close" (in the seventh inning or later, with the score tied or the tying run on base, at the plate, or on deck). In 2005, he had more walks (51) than strikeouts (48). He batted .304 with two out and runners in scoring position. He re-signed with the Astros in December 2005.

In 2006, Ausmus hit .230 and set a career high with nine sacrifice hits. In Game 4 of the 2005 National League Division Series against the Atlanta Braves, Ausmus homered with two outs in the bottom of the ninth inning to tie the game at 6–6 and send it to extra innings; the Astros went on to win in the 18th inning, in what was the longest postseason game in history. Ausmus caught 15 innings, and played 3 innings at first base.

In 2007, Ausmus batted .235, but was tied for second among all National League catchers with six stolen bases. He recorded his 100th career stolen base on July 27, becoming the 21st catcher all time to record that many steals.

Ausmus, lauded for his baseball smarts and highly regarded by teammates, was widely considered managerial material once his playing career ended.

Ausmus won the 2007 Darryl Kile Award "for integrity and courage", presented annually by local chapters of the Baseball Writers' Association of America (BBWAA) to players on the Astros and St. Louis Cardinals. In October 2007, Ausmus accepted a one-year, $2 million (plus incentives based on playing time) contract. The Astros planned for Ausmus to play on a part-time basis and mentor J. R. Towles, who would catch the majority of the games. Were Towles to struggle, however, the Astros were prepared to turn to Ausmus.

In May 2008, Ausmus (along with Johnny Damon, Andruw Jones, and Derek Lowe) was one of only four active major league players who had played at least 10 years in the majors without ever going on the disabled list.

On May 13, 2008, Ausmus got his 1,500th career hit. He was one of only eight catchers in major league history to get 1,500 hits and steal at least 100 bases.

In early June, with Towles batting only .145, the Astros optioned him to the minors and re-inserted Ausmus as a starter. Towles was replaced by journeyman minor-leaguer Humberto Quintero. Towles eventually came back, but during the season Ausmus, at 39, made more starts behind the plate (61) than either Towles or Quintero.

In July, Ausmus played at Nationals Park, appearing in his 44th major league stadium. Among active players, only Chris Gomez (47), Gary Sheffield (47), and Ken Griffey Jr. (45) had competed in more stadiums.

In August, he scored his 700th career run, becoming the 25th catcher to reach that mark.

Later in the month Ausmus said: "This will be my last year in Houston. It's just time to be closer to home." He has a home in San Diego, which narrowed it down to the Padres (which had expressed interest in him), Dodgers, and Angels. The Red Sox were also tempting, since Ausmus had a home near Boston, in Cape Cod.

On Sunday, August 24, the Astros played the New York Mets during the Mets International Heritage Week, an annual promotion. It happened to be Jewish Heritage Day, but though Ausmus is Jewish, he did not get to start the game. He had his only at bat during extra-innings, with the score tied at 4–4. Ausmus led off the 10th inning with his second homer of the season, and the Astros rallied for a 6–4 win.

Ausmus is Houston's all-time leader for catchers with 1,259 games, 970 hits, 396 walks, and 415 runs.

=== Los Angeles Dodgers (2009–10) ===
On January 26, 2009, Ausmus agreed to a 1-year, $1 million deal (plus incentives) to be a back-up catcher for the Los Angeles Dodgers.

"There's no question he can be a manager", Joe Torre said. "He's a smart cookie, everybody knows that, and he has an engaging personality." At the end of the season Torre had Ausmus manage the Dodgers for a game.

In 2009, Ausmus batted .295, including .333 with runners in scoring position, and .385 with 2 out and runners in scoring position, while limited to a career-low 107 at bats. He had never been on the disabled list in his 17-year career, giving him the most consecutive seasons of not going on the DL among all active players.

Ausmus became a free agent after the 2009 season, and on January 26, 2010, he agreed to a one-year, $850,000 deal (with total compensation guaranteed at $1 million) to return to the Dodgers for his 18th major league season. The deal also included a mutual option for 2011 worth $1 million; if either Ausmus or the Dodgers declined the option, Ausmus would be paid $150,000.

In 2010, Ausmus was the 5th-oldest player in the NL. On April 10, 2010, he was placed on the disabled list for the first time in his 18-year career in the Majors. He missed most of the season after having surgery in April to repair a lower back herniated disc, playing in only 21 games that season, and hitting .222.

Ausmus announced his retirement on October 3, 2010.

=== Defense ===
"I feel like when they say I'm one of the smarter ballplayers, it's just their way of saying I don't hit very much."

— Ausmus, when asked about being one of baseball's smartest players

Ausmus was known as "a brilliant defensive catcher," "an incredibly smart catcher," and "one of the most respected game-callers and pitching-staff handlers" in the game, In 2010, he was chosen as the ninth-smartest athlete in sports by Sporting News.

Ausmus exhibited superior range at catcher compared to the league average each season in his career. He was known for his strong arm, quick release, nimble footwork, deft framing of pitches, and smart handling of pitchers, as well as being able to block pitches very well. While the vast majority of his games were as a catcher, Ausmus also played a handful of games at first base, second base, third base, and shortstop, all of them without making an error.

He led NL catchers in putouts in 1994, with 683. Ausmus nabbed a league-leading 39 opposing baserunners (41.9%) in 1995, second in the NL to Florida Marlins' Charles Johnson, and led the league's catchers with 14 double plays and 63 assists. On August 2, 1997, he was the first catcher to wear the FOX mini-camera, in a Houston-New York Mets game. In 1997, he had 16 double plays, a career best, and led the league in caught-stealing percentage (49.5%), as he threw out 46 of 93 runners. In 1998, he finished second to Charles Johnson in the NL Gold Glove voting.

In 1999, he led the American League with a .998 fielding percentage. In 2000, Ausmus appeared in 150 games (leading the AL), starting 140 (the most ever by a Detroit catcher). He led the league with 68 assists and 898 putouts, and threw out 30 of 74 baserunners attempting to steal (47.5%), second in the AL in that category. In 2001, he led the NL with a .997 fielding percentage and only one passed ball, had the second-best caught-stealing percentage (47.7%) in the majors, and won the first of two consecutive National League Gold Gloves with the Astros. He led the league again with a .997 fielding percentage and an 8.40 range factor, while being charged with only two passed balls in 2002. In 2003, Ausmus had a .997 fielding percentage, for the third season in a row. He led the league with a .999 fielding percentage, 884 putouts, and 134 games caught in 2005.

Ausmus led the league again in a league-leading 138 games caught with a .998 fielding percentage (the fifth-best of any catcher ever at the time) and a 7.94 range factor, with a league-leading 929 putouts and only one passed ball, and won his third Gold Glove in 2006. That year he caught the second-most games ever by a catcher at the age of 37—only Bob Boone, with 147 games, caught more at that age.

He made his franchise-record eighth Opening Day start at catcher for the Astros in 2007, breaking a tie with Alan Ashby. On July 22 of that year, Ausmus passed Gary Carter to move into sole possession of second place in major league career putouts by a catcher. In addition, he passed Ted Simmons that day to take sole possession of 12th place all-time on the games caught list, with 1,772. In 2007, he had the second-best fielding percentage (.995) and range factor (8.04) of all catchers in the NL, while being charged with only two passed balls.

In 2008, the Astros named Ausmus as an "emergency infielder." In April, he played second base in the ninth inning of a game, and later in the season he played first base and third base. In 2005, he even played an inning at shortstop. Through 2008, Ausmus ranked ninth all-time in games caught (1,887) and starts at catcher (1,720).

Ausmus's 1,141 games at catcher in that decade ranked second in the majors.

Among active catchers with at least 600 games played, he finished the 2009 season ranked tied for fourth with a .994 career fielding percentage behind Mike Redmond (.996), Joe Mauer (.996), and A. J. Pierzynski (.995).

Ausmus finished his career in 2010 ranked third in major league history with 12,839 putouts as a catcher, trailing only Iván Rodríguez and Jason Kendall (all three have since been passed by Yadier Molina), seventh in games caught with 1,938, and tenth in both range factor/game (7.12) and fielding percentage (.994). For his career, he threw out 30.2% of potential base stealers.

== Post-playing career ==
=== San Diego Padres (2011–13) ===
In 2011, Ausmus was named field executive of the San Diego Padres. Ausmus held that position until the 2013 season, when he departed to become the manager of the Detroit Tigers.

=== Detroit Tigers (2014–17) ===
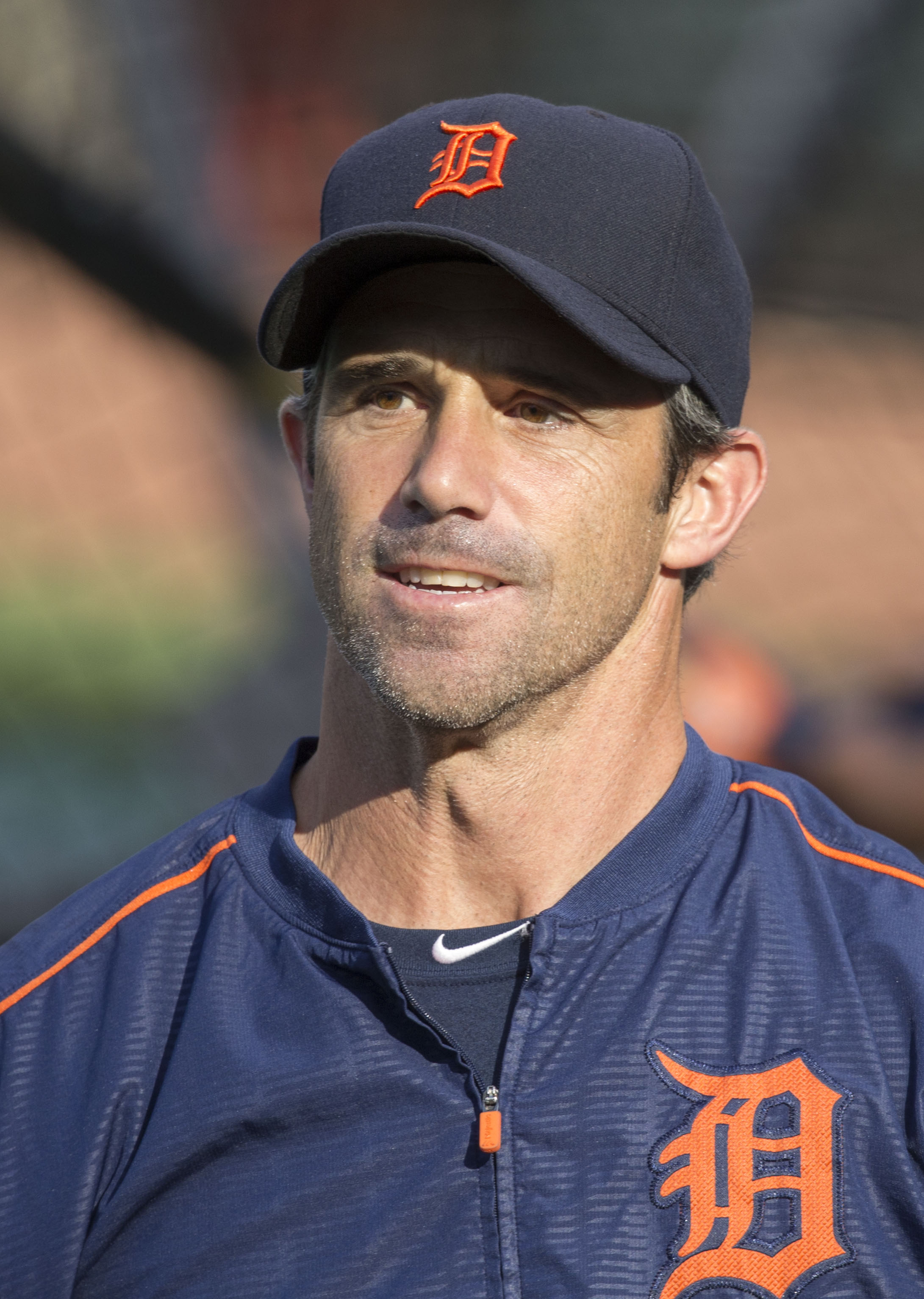
Ausmus in 2015 managing the Detroit Tigers

On November 3, 2013, Ausmus was named the 38th manager in the history of the Detroit Tigers, succeeding Jim Leyland. At 45 years of age, he was the second-youngest manager in the American League. In his first year as manager, Ausmus led the Tigers to a 90–72 record, winning the American League Central division title. Despite their potent starting rotation, the Tigers were swept by the Baltimore Orioles in the 2014 American League Division Series.

In his second year as manager, the Tigers had a disappointing 74–87 record, finishing in last place in their division. In his third season, the Tigers finished in second place in the AL Central division with an 86–75 record, 2.5 games out of the second postseason Wild Card spot. Shortly after the 2016 season concluded, the Tigers announced they would exercise the fourth-year option on Ausmus's contract, keeping him as manager for the 2017 season.

During the 2017 season the Tigers lost 98 games and finished last. Ausmus had his pitchers issue 42 intentional walks, the most in the AL. On September 22, 2017, the Tigers opted to not extend Ausmus' four-year contract, announcing he would not return in 2018. He finished his stint with the Tigers with a record of 314 wins and 332 losses in the regular season. Through 2018, he was one of seven Jewish managers in MLB history. The others were Gabe Kapler, Bob Melvin, Jeff Newman, Norm Sherry, Lou Boudreau, and Lip Pike.

=== Los Angeles Angels (2018–19) ===
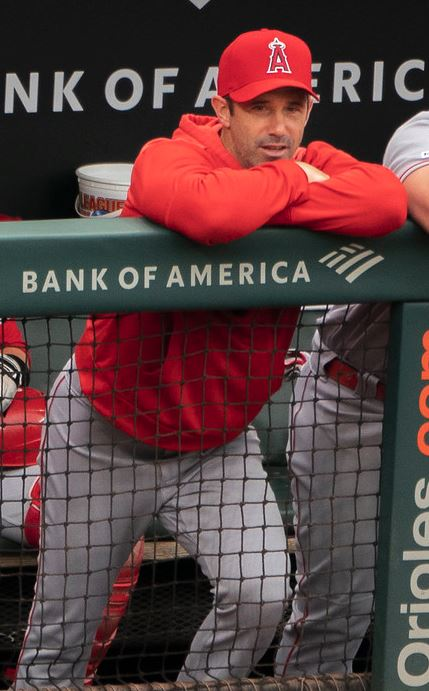
Ausmus in 2019 managing the Los Angeles Angels

Ausmus was a special assistant to Los Angeles Angels general manager Billy Eppler for the 2018 season.

On October 21, 2018, Ausmus was named the 17th manager in franchise history, replacing Mike Scioscia. He signed a three-year contract, but was dismissed after the conclusion of the 2019 season. He finished with a record of 72 wins and 90 losses.

=== Oakland Athletics (2022) ===
On January 14, 2022, Ausmus was named the bench coach for the Oakland Athletics. On November 7, it was announced that Ausmus was seeking a front office position and would not return the bench coach role in 2023.

=== New York Yankees (2024–2026) ===
On November 21, 2023, Ausmus was hired by the New York Yankees as their new bench coach for the 2024 season.

=== Houston Astros (2027–present) ===
On November 11, 2026, Ausmus was hired by the Houston Astros to be the 26th manager in franchise history.

=== Managerial record ===
| Team | Year | Regular season | | | | | Postseason | | | |
| Team | Year | Games | Won | Lost | Win % | Finish | Won | Lost | Win % | Result |
|---|---|---|---|---|---|---|---|---|---|---|
| DET | 2014 | 162 | 90 | 72 | .556 | 1st in AL Central | 0 | 3 | .000 | Lost ALDS (BAL) |
| DET | 2015 | 161 | 74 | 87 | .460 | 5th in AL Central | – | – | – | |
| DET | 2016 | 161 | 86 | 75 | .534 | 2nd in AL Central | – | – | – | |
| DET | 2017 | 162 | 64 | 98 | .395 | 5th in AL Central | – | – | – | |
| DET total | | 646 | 314 | 332 | .486 | | 0 | 3 | .000 | |
| LAA | 2019 | 162 | 72 | 90 | .444 | 4th in AL West | – | – | – | |
| LAA total | | 162 | 72 | 90 | .444 | | 0 | 0 | – | |
| Total | | 808 | 386 | 422 | .478 | | 0 | 3 | .000 | |

== Israeli national team ==
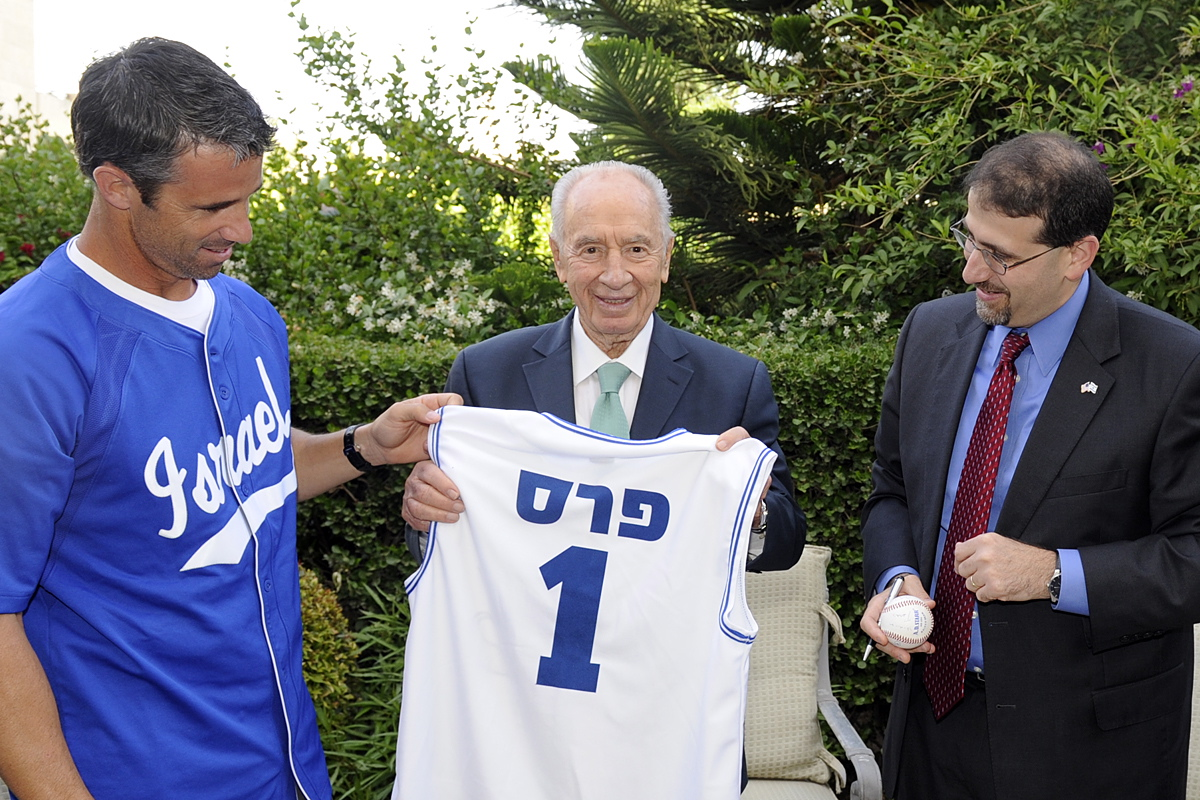
Ausmus, Israeli president Shimon Peres and U.S. ambassador Daniel B. Shapiro in 2012 (l-r)

Ausmus managed the Israel national baseball team in the qualification round of the 2013 World Baseball Classic (WBC), from May through September 2012. Israel, under WBC rules, was entitled to have non-Israeli citizens of Jewish heritage play for the team. Israel lost to Spain in extra innings in the pool finals, missing out on a spot in the main WBC tournament.

Ausmus was a coach for Israel, under manager Ian Kinsler, when it competed in the 2023 World Baseball Classic.

Ausmus returned as manager of the Israel national baseball team for the 2026 World Baseball Classic, replacing Ian Kinsler. He led Israel to a 2–2 record in Pool D in March 2026, with wins over Nicaragua and the Netherlands, to secure 2030 tournament qualification.

== Personal life ==
In 2001, Ausmus did not play on Yom Kippur, the Jewish Day of Atonement, quipping that he "was trying to atone for my poor first half." Ausmus was inducted into the National Jewish Sports Hall of Fame in 2004.

Ausmus and his wife, Liz, were married in 1995. They live in New Haven, Connecticut, and have two daughters.

== Bibliography ==
- Ausmus, Brad (June 12, 2007). "You guys just can't get enough". ESPN The Magazine.

== See also ==
- Houston Astros award winners and league leaders
- List of Dartmouth College alumni
- List of Jewish Major League Baseball players
- List of Major League Baseball career assists leaders
- List of Major League Baseball career games played as a catcher leaders
- List of Major League Baseball career putouts as a catcher leaders
