= List of Detroit Tigers managers =

The Detroit Tigers are a professional baseball team based in Detroit, Michigan. The Tigers are members of the American League Central Division in Major League Baseball. In baseball, the head coach of a team is called the manager, or more formally, the field manager. The duties of the team manager include team strategy and leadership on and off the field. The team initially began in the now defunct Western League in 1894, and later became one of the American League's eight charter franchises in 1901. Since the inception of the team in 1894, it has employed 48 different managers. The Tigers' current manager is A. J. Hinch, who was named manager on October 30, 2020, following the sudden retirement of Ron Gardenhire.

The franchise's first manager after the team's arrival in the American League was George Stallings, who managed the team for one season. Hall of Famer Hughie Jennings, who managed the team from 1907 to 1920, led the team to three American League championships. Jennings however was unable to win the World Series, losing to the Chicago Cubs in 1907 and 1908 and the Pittsburgh Pirates in 1909. The Detroit Tigers did not win their first World Series until 1935 under the leadership of player-manager Mickey Cochrane. Steve O'Neill later led the Tigers to another World Series victory again in 1945. The Tigers would not win another World Series until 1968 World Series when the Tigers, led by Mayo Smith, defeated the St. Louis Cardinals. Sparky Anderson's 1984 Detroit Tigers team was the franchise's last World Series victory, and marked the first time in Major League Baseball history that a manager won the World Series in both leagues. In total, the Tigers have won the American League pennant 10 times, and the World Series 4 times.

The longest tenured Tiger manager was Sparky Anderson. Anderson managed the team for 2,579 games from 1979 to 1995. Hughie Jennings, Bucky Harris and Jim Leyland are the only other Detroit Tiger managers who have managed the team for more than 1,000 games. Anderson's 1331 wins and 1248 losses also lead all Tiger managers, while Cochrane's winning percentage of .582 is the highest of any Tiger manager who has managed at least one full-season. Nine Hall of Famers have managed the Tigers: Ed Barrow, Jennings, Ty Cobb, Cochrane, Joe Gordon, Harris, Alan Trammell, Anderson, and Leyland. Barrow was elected as an executive, Jennings, Anderson, and Leyland were elected as managers; the others were elected as players.

== Key ==
#	Number of managers^{[a]}
G	Regular season games managed; may not equal sum of wins and losses due to tie games
W	Regular season wins
L	Regular season losses
Win%	Winning percentage
PA	Playoff appearances: number of years this manager has led the franchise to the playoffs
PW	Playoff wins
PL	Playoff losses
LC	League Championships: number of League Championships, or pennants, achieved by the manager
WS	World Series Championships: number of World Series victories achieved by the manager
Ref	Reference(s)
†	Inducted into the Baseball Hall of Fame primarily as a manager or executive
*	Inducted into the Baseball Hall of Fame primarily as a player
**	Manager acted as interim manager

== Managers ==
=== Western League ===
#^{[a]}	Image	Manager	Seasons	W	L	Win%	Ref
1		Bob Glenalvin	1894				
2		Con Strouthers	1895–96				
3		George Stallings	1896				
4		Bob Allen	1897				
5		Frank Graves	1897–98				
6		Ollie Beard	1898				
7		Tony Mullane	1898				
8		George Stallings	1898–1900				

=== American League ===
Through September 18, 2020

#^{[a]}	Image	Manager	Seasons	W	L	Win%	PA	PW	PL	LC	WS	Ref
1		George Stallings	1901	74	61	.548						
2		Frank Dwyer	1902	52	83	.385						
3		Ed Barrow^{†}	1903–1904	97	117	.453						
4		Bobby Lowe^{**}	1904	30	44	.405						
5		Bill Armour	1905–1906	150	152	.497						
6		Hughie Jennings^{†}	1907–1920	1131	972	.538	3	4	12	3	0	
7		Ty Cobb^{*}	1921–1926	479	444	.519						
8		George Moriarty	1927–1928	150	157	.489						
9		Bucky Harris	1929–1933	355	410	.464						
10		Del Baker^{**}	1933	2	0	1.000						
11		Mickey Cochrane*	1934–1936	259	166	.609	2	7	6	2	1	
–		Del Baker	1936	18	16	.529						
–		Mickey Cochrane^{*}	1937	42	33	.560						
–		Del Baker	1937	41	23	.641						
12		Cy Perkins^{**}	1937	6	9	.400						
–		Mickey Cochrane*	1938	47	51	.480						
–		Del Baker	1938–1942	356	316	.530	1	3	4	1	0	
13		Steve O'Neill	1943–1948	509	414	.551	1	4	3	1	1	
14		Red Rolfe	1949–1952	278	256	.521						
15		Fred Hutchinson	1952–1954	155	235	.397						
–		Bucky Harris	1955–1956	161	147	.523						
16		Jack Tighe	1957–1958	99	104	.488						
17		Bill Norman	1958–1959	58	64	.475						
18		Jimmy Dykes	1959–1960	118	115	.506						
19		Billy Hitchcock^{**}	1960	1	0	1.000						
20		Joe Gordon^{*}	1960	26	31	.456						
21		Bob Scheffing	1961–1963	210	173	.548						
22		Chuck Dressen	1963–1964	140	124	.530						
23		Bob Swift	1965	24	18	.571						
–		Chuck Dressen	1965–1966	81	65	.555						
–		Bob Swift^{**}	1966	32	25	.561						
24		Frank Skaff^{**}	1966	40	39	.506						
25		Mayo Smith	1967–1970	363	285	.560	1	4	3	1	1	
26		Billy Martin	1971–1973	248	204	.549	1	2	3	0	0	
27		Joe Schultz^{**}	1973	14	14	.500						
28		Ralph Houk	1974–1978	363	443	.450						
29		Les Moss	1979	27	26	.509						
30		Dick Tracewski^{**}	1979	2	0	1.000						
31		Sparky Anderson^{†}	1979–1995	1331	1248	.516	2	8	5	1	1	
32		Buddy Bell	1996–1998	184	277	.399						
33		Larry Parrish	1998–1999	82	104	.441						
34		Phil Garner	2000–2002	145	185	.439						
35		Luis Pujols^{**}	2002	55	100	.355						
36		Alan Trammell^{*}	2003–2005	186	300	.383						
37		Jim Leyland^{†}	2006–2013	700	597	.540	4	25	23	2	0	
38		Brad Ausmus	2014–2017	314	332	.486	1	0	3	0	0	
39		Ron Gardenhire	2018–2020	132	241	.354	0	0	0	0	0	
40		Lloyd McClendon^{**}	2020	2	6	.250	0	0	0	0	0	
41		A. J. Hinch	2021–present	287	334	.462	2	8	7	0	0	

== Managers with multiple tenures ==
#	Manager	Seasons	G	W	L	Win%	PA	PW	PL	LC	WS	Ref
9	Bucky Harris	1929–1933; 1955–1956	1,078	516	557	.481						
10	Mickey Cochrane*	1934–1936, 1937, 1938	600	348	250	.582	2	7	6	2	1	
11	Del Baker	1933, 1936, 1937, 1938–1942	675	417	355	.540						
22	Chuck Dressen	1963–1964; 1965–1966	411	221	189	.539						
23	Bob Swift	1965, 1966	99	56	43	.566						

== Notes ==
- ^{a} A running total of the number of managers of the Tigers. Thus, any manager who has two or more separate terms as a manager is only counted once.
