= 2018 Idol Star Athletics Bowling Archery Rhythmic Gymnastics Aerobics Championships =

- Also known as: 2018 Idol Star Athletics Championships New Year Special
- Genre: Sports; Variety show
- Written by: Kim Jeong-min; Byun Eun-jeong; Woo Eun-jeong; Kim Young-ri; Kim So-young; Nam Soo-hee
- Directed by: Choi Haeng-ho
- Presented by: Jun Hyun-moo; Leeteuk; Yoon Bo-mi
- Country of origin: South Korea
- Original language: Korean
- No. of episodes: 4

Production
- Executive producer: Park Jeong-gyu
- Production locations: Goyang Gymnasium; Jungangro 1601, Ilsanseo-gu, Goyang, Gyeonggi-do
- Running time: 140 minutes

Original release
- Network: MBC
- Release: February 15 – February 16, 2018

The 2018 Idol Star Athletics Bowling Archery Rhythmic Gymnastics Aerobics Championships (Korean: 2018 아이돌스타 육상 볼링 양궁 리듬 체조 에어로빅 선수권 대회) was held at Goyang Gymnasium in Goyang, South Korea on January 15 and was broadcast on MBC on February 15 and 16 for four episodes at 5:10 p.m. KST.

== Synopsis ==
The show features male and female K-pop entertainers, which competes in various sports competitions. At the championships, a total of ten events (four in athletics, two in ten-pin bowling, two in archery (which has switched to 7 shots per round instead of 10), one in aerobics and one in rhythmic gymnastics) were contested: six by men and five by women. There were more than 200 K-pop idols participating, divided into 14 teams.

== Cast ==
=== Presenters ===
Jun Hyun-moo, Super Junior's Leeteuk and Apink's Yoon Bo-mi hosted the show.

=== Main ===
Full 2018 ISAC New Year's line-up

Male

Exo, Wanna One, BtoB, VIXX, Seventeen, Nu'est W, Monsta X, Astro, Highlight, NCT 127, UP10TION, Snuper, KNK, Victon, Imfact, ONF, The East Light, Romeo, Golden Child, MVP, MXM, The Boyz, BLK, IN2IT, Rainz, Top Secret, TraxX, and Myteen.

Female

Twice, Red Velvet, GFriend, Lovelyz, Laboum, Oh My Girl, DIA, Cosmic Girls, Gugudan, Apink, Nine Muses, April, Pristin, Weki Meki, Dreamcatcher, CLC, Momoland, Berry Good, Baby Boo, Favorite, H.U.B, Gate9, S.I.S, Busters, Hash Tag, Minseo, Kriesha Chu, Yuseol, ELRIS, and 1NB.

== Results ==
=== Men ===
Athletics

| Event | Gold | Silver | Bronze |
|---|---|---|---|
| 60 m | Woosung (Snuper) | Han Seung-woo (Victon) | Joohoney (Monsta X) |
| 4 × 100 m | Astro | KNK | Snuper |

Aerobics

| Event | Gold | Silver | Bronze |
|---|---|---|---|
| Men's Team | Astro | The Boyz | Golden Child |

Archery

| Event | Gold | Silver | Bronze |
|---|---|---|---|
| Men's Team | Up10tion | NU'EST W | Monsta X |

Bowling

| Event | Gold | Silver | Bronze |
|---|---|---|---|
| Men's Team | Chanyeol (Exo) & Jay (TraxX) | Rocky & Cha Eunwoo (Astro) | Joohoney & Minhyuk (Monsta X) |

=== Women ===
Athletics

| Event | Gold | Silver | Bronze |
|---|---|---|---|
| 60 m | Rui (H.U.B) | Jihye (S.I.S) | Yuseol |
| 4 × 100 m | Dreamcatcher | Laboum | Oh My Girl |

Rhythmic Gymnastics

| Event | Gold | Silver | Bronze |
|---|---|---|---|
| Women | Rachel (April) | Seungyeon (CLC) | Cheng Xiao (Cosmic Girls) |

Archery

| Event | Gold | Silver | Bronze |
|---|---|---|---|
| Women's Team | Oh My Girl | Gugudan | No Winner |

Bowling

| Event | Gold | Silver | Bronze |
|---|---|---|---|
| Women's Team | Solbin & Soyeon (Laboum) | Doyeon & Lucy (Weki Meki) | No Winner |

== Ratings ==
| Episode # | Original broadcast date | TNmS Ratings | | AGB Nielsen Ratings | |
| Episode # | Original broadcast date | Nationwide | Seoul National Capital Area | Nationwide | Seoul National Capital Area |
|---|---|---|---|---|---|
| 1 | February 15, 2018 | 6.2% | % | 5.7% | 6.2% |
| 2 | February 15, 2018 | 8.4% | % | 6.6% | 7.1% |
| 3 | February 16, 2018 | 4.9% | % | 4.6% | % |
| 4 | February 16, 2018 | 6.0% | % | 5.7% | % |
