= DJ DOC =

South Korean hip hop group

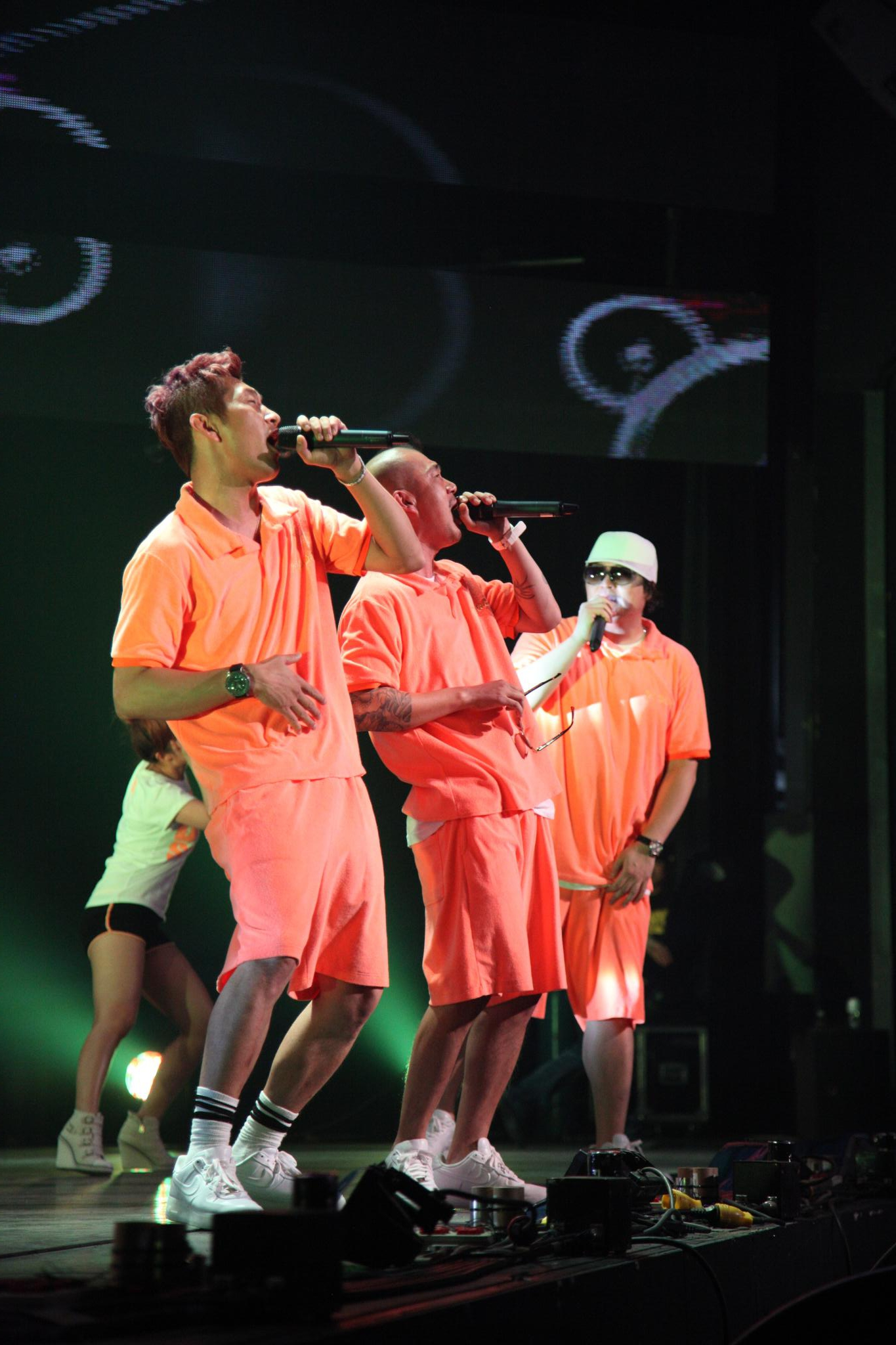

Background information
- Origin: South Korea
- Genres: Korean hip hop, K-pop
- Years active: 1994–2018; 2024
- Members: Lee Ha-neul; Jung Jae-yong; Kim Chang-yeol
- Past members: Park Jung-hwan

DJ D.O.C. is a South Korean hip-hop trio consisting of members Kim Chang-yeol, Lee Ha-neul and Jung Jae-yong. DJ D.O.C. stands for Dream Of Children. DJ DOC released their first album, Sorrow of Superman, in 1994. During a time when Korean hip hop was still largely underground, they went on to experience great commercial success and many of their singles, including "Dance with DOC" (1997) and "Run to You" (2000) are now considered well-known iconic K-pop songs.

Initially an underground group, DJ DOC became known to mainstream audiences for the satirical content of their lyrics, which often criticized societal injustices and overtly used profanity. It garnered them both popularity and criticism during the mid to late 1990s; their songs became well known to a younger generation already disgruntled with the government's strict censorship rules regarding free speech but was also censored by radio and television stations for the provocative lyrics.

== History ==
The original band debuted with Park Jung-hwan, but he left the group after the release of the first album due to disagreement between the members. After his departure, he started his own car dealership.

On November 11, 2011, Park Jung-hwan formally filed a lawsuit against DJ DOC for defamation after comments made by Lee Ha-neul regarding his departure on a television appearance aired November 3, 2011 on Happy Together Season 3.

Despite several apologies made by Lee Ha-neul, the lawsuit was not rescinded. On February 22, 2012, DJ Doc was cleared of the defamation charges for lack of evidence.

During periods of hiatus, Lee and Kim have been engaged in solo activities. Kim hosts the popular radio show Old School (ko) on SBS Love FM. On August 9, 2013, Lee became a judge for season 5 of South Korean television talent show Superstar K. In 2015 they made a guest appearance in the music video of "Tell Me One More Time", the comeback single of their counterparts Jinusean.

DJ DOC was one of fifteen artists or groups, including the likes of Insooni, 2PM and Kim Tae-woo, headlining the medal ceremony aftershow for each day of the 2018 Winter Olympics.

== Members ==
- Lee Ha-neul (이하늘)
- Jung Jae-yong (정재용)
- Kim Chang-yeol (김창열)

Past members

- Park Jung-hwan (박정환)

== Discography ==
=== Studio albums ===
Title	Album details	Peak chart positions	Sales
Title	Album details	KOR	Sales
Sorrow of Superman (슈퍼맨의 비애)	Released: November 1, 1994; Label: Dae Woo Record Co.; Formats: CD, cassette	No data	No data
Murphy's Law (머피의 법칙)	Released: May 19, 1995; Label: Dae Woo Record Co.; Formats: CD, cassette	No data	No data
DJ2DOC (D際2德)	Released: January 10, 1996; Label: Shinchon Music; Formats: CD, cassette	No data	KOR: 1,950,000+
4th Album	Released: April 1, 1997; Label: Synnara Music Co.; Formats: CD, cassette	No data	KOR: 1,000,000+
The Life... DOC Blues	Released: May 16, 2000; Label: Freestyle; Formats: CD, cassette	3	KOR: 667,582+
Sex and Love, Happiness	Released: November 9, 2004; Label: EMI Records; Formats: CD, cassette	2	KOR: 79,608+
Pungnyu (풍류)	Released: July 29, 2010; Label: Show Globe; Formats: CD, digital download	2	KOR: 40,571

=== Compilation albums ===
- Best of Best Panda Mix (1998)
- Season's Greeting (2000)
- The Best (2000)

=== Extended plays ===
- 대한민국 만세 (1996)
- Summer (1996)

=== Singles ===
- "Cheers" (2024)

== Awards and nominations ==
=== Mnet Asian Music Awards ===
Year	Category	Work	Result
2000	Best Group	"Run To You"	Nominated
2000	Best Hip-Hop Performance	"DOC Blues"	Won
2004	Best Male Group Video	"One Night"	Nominated
2010	Best Rap Performance	"I'm Like This"	Won
2010	Song of the Year	"I Am Who I Am"	Nominated

=== Other awards ===
Year	Award	Category	Result
2010	Golden Disk Awards	Bonsang	Won
2010	MelOn Music Awards	Top 10 Artists	Won
2010	Korea Cultural Entertainment Awards	New Generation Kayo	Won
