= Kim Bum-soo (singer) =

South Korean singer

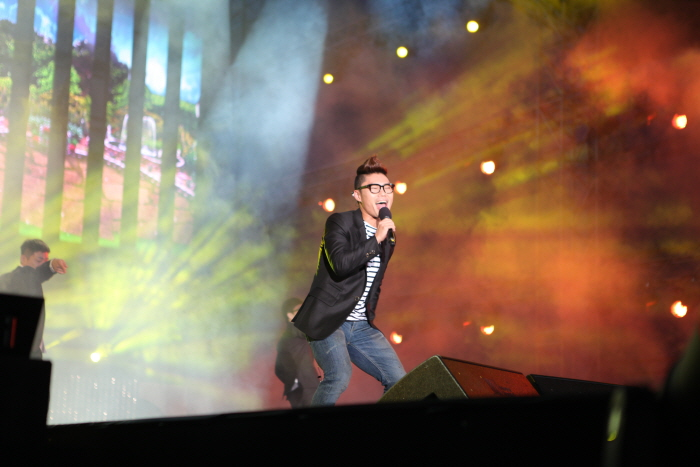
- Kim in 2014

Background information
- Born: January 26, 1979 (age 47)
- Origin: South Korea
- Genres: Pop, R&B, soul
- Occupation: Singer
- Years active: 1999–present
- Label: Young Entertainment
- Website: youngent.co.kr

Korean name
- Hangul: 김범수
- Hanja: 金範洙
- RR: Gim Beomsu
- MR: Kim Pŏmsu

Kim Bum-soo (Korean: 김범수; born January 26, 1979) is a South Korean singer who is widely considered one of the country's best vocalists. Kim debuted in 1999 with the album, A Promise, and in 2001, he charted on the Billboard Hot Singles Sales chart with his song "Hello Goodbye Hello" which reached number 51. He is best known for the song, "I Miss You," which was featured on the soundtrack for the 2003 Korean drama, Stairway to Heaven.

== Early life and education ==
Kim was born in Changwon, South Gyeongsang Province, South Korea. He later moved with his family to Seoul, where he attended Gangseo Technical High School. He later described himself as an "outsider" in high school, until he joined a church choir, where he was praised for his singing ability.

He studied music at Soongsil University and at Seoul Institute of the Arts.

== Career ==
Kim made his debut as a singer in 1999 with the album, A Promise. While the album's title song was included on the soundtrack for the Korean drama, See and See Again (보고 또 보고), the album only sold modestly well.

After he released his second album, Remember, in 2000, Kim received an offer to record the title track, "Once Upon a Day" in English and to market it in the United States. The English version of the song, which was named, "Hello Goodbye Hello," reached number 51 on the Billboard Hot Singles Sales chart dated December 22, 2001.

Kim's big break in South Korea came in 2003, when the title track from his 2002 album, I Miss You, was included on the soundtrack for the Korean drama, Stairway to Heaven. Both the song and the drama were hits, and Kim performed in Japan for the first time after the drama was aired there.

Kim released his fifth album, So Long..., in 2006 before enlisting in the military. From April 2006 to October 2008, Kim served as an "entertainment soldier" under the Ministry of National Defense to complete his mandatory military service.

He returned with his sixth album Kim Bum Soo Vol. 6 August 19, 2008 with high expectations from the public. Kwak Jin-sung of OhmyNews felt that the various artists featured on the album such as Kim Yu-bin and Younha were intended to help attract listeners. In December of the same year, he released "A Story Sadder Than Sadness (슬픔보다 더 슬픈 이야기)" as the titular song of the drama film More Than Blue.

In 2009, he released the singles "Regrets to Forget (잊은만큼 후회해)", "Slow Man" and "Color Of City (Blue)" for the special project Color of City. In June 2010, he sang for the soundtrack of the television drama Giant with the song "Loving You". In September, he released his next album Solista Part.1 with the lead single "It Will Pass (지나간다)". He then released the song "Appear (나타나)" for the soundtrack of the SBS drama Secret Garden.

I will never forget that moment. It was the first time that I was in the center of all that attention. I felt like "I can be the hero. I can be applauded".

— Kim Bum-soo, during an interview with The Korea Herald in April 2018.

He collaborated with Girls' Generation member Taeyeon for the single "Different (달라)" in January 2011 before appearing in the first season of the singing competition show I Am a Singer wherein South Korea's most established vocalists competed against each other, months later. Kim never thought of himself as one of the country's most popular singers before joining the show which he credits for helping his popularity to grow substantially. He won consecutively for seven episodes which allowed him to be rewarded with a "meritorious graduation" by the show. He then released his next album Solista Part. 2 in June with the lead single "Last Love (끝사랑)". The album also included "Different (달라)". The next month, he released "Person, Love (사람, 사랑)" with Lena Park. In November, he sang "Though I Don't Say It (말하지 않아도)" for the soundtrack of the SBS historical drama Deep Rooted Tree.

In May 2012, he released the single "Rock Star" and in November, he collaborated with Lena Park for a second time for the single "White Winter (하얀 겨울)".

Kim was approached by Hong Myung-bo to sing the theme song for the Hong Myung-bo Scholarship Foundation Campaign in 2013, which was intended to raise funds for pediatric cancer treatment. "Higher" was released on December 27, 2013. In September 2014, he released the single "Teardrop of My Heart (눈물나는 내 사랑)". Kim released a studio album three years after his last album, titled HIM on November 12 with the lead single "Home Meal (집 밥)" featuring Geeks and Mrs. Kim.

In February 2015, he sang for the SBS romantic comedy television series Hyde Jekyll, Me's official soundtrack and released "Only You (오직 너만)". In April 2016, he released "Pain Poem (서툰 시)" as part of SM Entertainment's SM Station project.

Kim released "I Love You (사랑해요)" for the soundtrack of the KBS2 drama Uncontrollably Fond on August 4, 2016 and on March 15, 2017, he released another single for a drama titled "Amnesia (기억상실증)" for the official soundtrack of Saimdang, Memoir of Colors. Kim released a remake of Shin Hyo-beom's 1996 song "I Love You (난 널 사랑해)" for his single album re.MAKE20 #1 on April 26, 2018.

== Public image ==
"Kim-Na-Park-Lee" is a known phrase in South Korea which refers to Kim Bum-soo, Naul, Park Hyo-shin and Lee Soo who are considered the country's top vocalists. Kim struggled with being labelled a "faceless" singer (A term in South Korea for singers who are not considered visually appealing by the public) for a long time which also partly affected his career due to the industry avoiding putting him in the spotlight, despite being one of the country's best vocalists, because of South Korea's standards of looks being just as important as talent. In an interview with Cindy Zimmer of ATK Magazine in August 2016, he shared, "I was not happy that my song was judged by my appearance, not by my talent, or the song itself. I wanted to show and let them think how I was prepared, and listen to my song first. At first, I felt sad that only my appearance stood out." but believed the comments "made him stronger" and people have started to "take my songs and skills just as they are, and I really appreciate it".

== Discography ==
- A Promise (1999)
- Remember (2000)
- New Song & Special (2001)
- I Miss You (보고 싶다) (2002)
- Friends (2003)
- The 4th Episode (2004)
- So Long... (2006)
- Kim Bum Soo Vol. 6 (2008)
- Solista Part 1 (2010)
- Solista Part 2 (2011)
- Him (2014)

== Filmography ==
=== Television shows ===
Year	Title	Role	Ref.
2014	Superstar K 6	Judge	
2015-2016	I Can See Your Voice	Host	
2015	Superstar K 7	Judge	
2016	Superstar K 2016	Judge	
2021	Tomorrow's National Singer	Judge	
2022	The Second World	Judge	

== Awards and nominations ==
Award	Year	Category	Nominated work	Result	Ref.
KBS Music Awards	2004	Bonsang	"Sun Sets in My Heart" (가슴에 지는 태양)	Won	
MAMA Awards	1999	Best New Solo Artist	"Promise" (약속)	Nominated	
MAMA Awards	2003	Best Ballad Performance	"I Miss You" (보고싶다)	Nominated	
MAMA Awards	2011	Best Male Artist	"Last Love"	Nominated	
Melon Music Awards	2011	Best R&B/Ballad Award	"Please" (제발)	Won	
