= Kevin Oh =

South Korean-American singer (born 1990)

- 케빈오
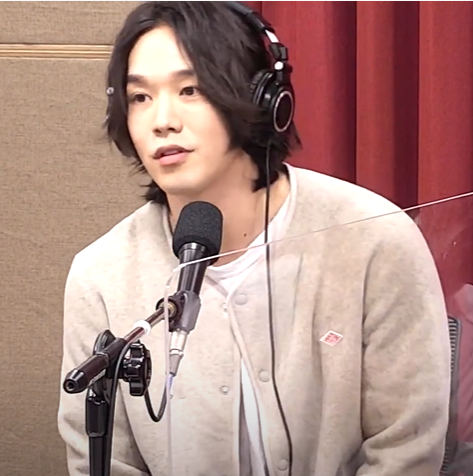
- Kevin Oh in Oct 2020
- Born: Oh Won-geun; August 29, 1990 (age 36); Long Island, New York, United States
- Citizenship: South Korea; United States
- Education: Dartmouth College – Department of Economics and Theater
- Occupation: Singer-songwriter
- Agent: T Cask ENT
- Spouse: Gong Hyo-jin (m. 2022)
- Musical career
- Genres: R&B; Ballad
- Instrument: Vocals
- Years active: 2016–present
- Website

Korean name
- Hangul: 오원근
- RR: O Wongeun
- MR: O Wŏn'gŭn

Kevin Oh (Korean: 케빈오, born August 29, 1990), is a South Korean and American singer-songwriter. He is the winner of Superstar K7. He released his first EP, Stardust, on January 20, 2017. He was also a contestant on the JTBC show, Superband.

== Personal life ==
=== Early life ===
Kevin attended Dartmouth College from 2008 to 2012, where he majored in Government and Theater. He was a brother of Chi Gamma Epsilon fraternity.

=== Relationship and marriage ===
In April 2022, Kevin and actress Gong Hyo-jin admitted that they were dating. Later, on August 17, 2022, Kevin announced in letters posted on his social media accounts that they would be getting married in October in the United States, and the marriage ceremony would be held privately with only close relatives from both families. They married in a private ceremony on October 11, 2022 (US time) in New York City.

=== Military service ===
The Korea Economic Daily reported that Kevin fulfilled his mandatory military service in December 2023 and was then currently serving as an active duty soldier. He entered the Army Training Center on December 12. Kevin has dual Korean and American citizenship; he enlisted in the military for a stable life in Korea with his wife.

== Discography ==
=== Extended plays ===
Title	Album details	Peak chart positions	Sales
Title	Album details	KOR	Sales
Stardust	Released: January 20, 2017; Label: CJ E&M; Formats: CD, digital download	35	KOR: 701

=== Singles ===
Title	Year	Peak chart positions	Sales (DL)	Album
Title	Year	KOR	Sales (DL)	Album
As lead artist
"Stardust"	2017	—	—N/a	Stardust
"Sorry" (알아줘)	2017	—	—N/a	Non-album single
"—" denotes releases that did not chart.

=== Soundtrack appearances ===
Year	Title	Album
2016	"Baby Blue"	Dear My Friends OST
2017	"Be My Light"	Chicago Typewriter OST
2017	"With You"	Manhole OST
2018	"One More Flight"	Twelve Nights OST
2019	"I Can't Say It's Only You"	Clean with Passion for Now OST
2020	"Mind"	Hot Stove League OST
2020	"Falling Slow"	More Than Friends OST
2021	"Crazy"	D.P. OST (with Primary)
2021	"Higher (Acoustic Version)"	D.P. OST (with Primary)
2021	"Free"	D.P. OST (with Primary)
2021	"Higher (Synth Version)"	D.P. OST (with Primary)
2022	"Memories More than Love"	Snowdrop OST
2022	"Where My Heart Falls" (내 마음 내리는 곳에)	Yumi's Cells Season 2 OST
2022	"You're The Only One (Male Ver.)"	The Golden Spoon OST
