= Park Si-hwan =

South Korean singer (born 1987)

Park Si-Hwan
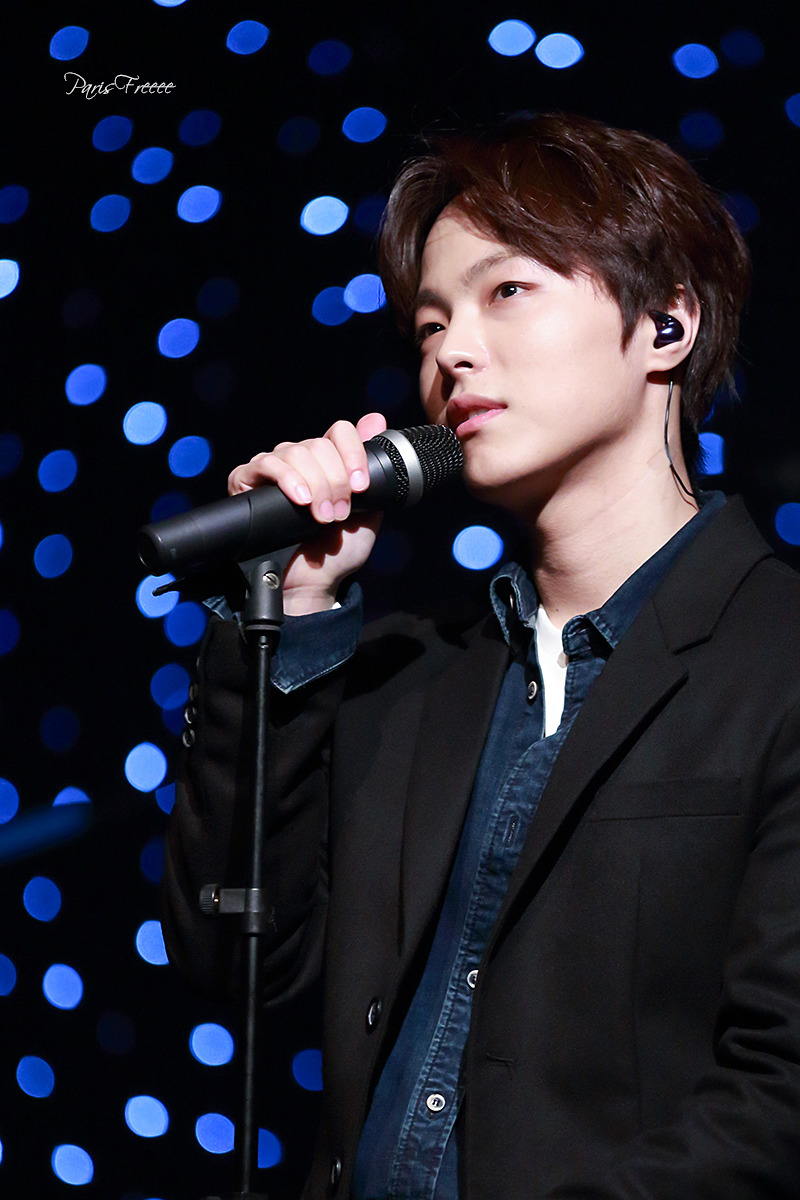
- Park at the Rolling Hall 22nd Anniversary Concert on February 24, 2017

Background information
- Born: July 30, 1987 (age 39); Seoul, South Korea
- Genres: K-pop, R&B
- Occupation: Singer
- Years active: 2013–present
- Labels: Stone Music Entertainment, Totalset

Park Si-hwan (Korean: 박시환; born July 30, 1987) is a South Korean singer. He is known as the runner-up of Mnet's Superstar K5. He released his first single, There's Nothing I Can Do on April 10, 2014.

== Discography ==
=== Studio albums ===
| Title | Album details | Peak chart positions | Sales |
| Title | Album details | KOR | Sales |
|---|---|---|---|
| Rainbow Taste | Release date: April 2, 2015; Label: Totalset; Format: CD, digital download | 4 | KOR: 5,808 |
| Sing By Me (나로 노래하다) | Release date: December 29, 2016; Label: Totalset; Format: CD, digital download | 29 | KOR: 765 |

=== Extended plays ===
| Title | Album details | Peak chart positions | Sales |
| Title | Album details | KOR | Sales |
|---|---|---|---|
| Spring Awakening | Release date: April 14, 2014; Label: Stone Music Entertainment; Format: CD, digital download | 2 | KOR: 9,323 |
| Monster (괴물) | Release date: November 23, 2015; Label: Totalset; Format: CD, digital download | 11 | KOR: 3,943 |

=== Singles ===
| Title | Year | Peak chart positions | Sales | Album |
| Title | Year | KOR | Sales | Album |
|---|---|---|---|---|
| "My Love" (내 사람) | 2013 | 35 | KOR: 31,242 | Superstar K 5 Top 10 |
| "There's Nothing I Can Do" (할 수 있는 건 없다) | 2014 | 29 | KOR: 37,556 | Spring Awakening |
| "I Just Loved You" (다만 그대를) | 2014 | 4 | KOR: 121,888 | Spring Awakening |
| "Dessert" (디저트) | 2015 | 15 | —N/a | Rainbow Taste |
| "Ups & Down" | 2015 | — | —N/a | Monster |
| "Monster" (괴물) with Massida Band | 2015 | 88 | —N/a | Monster |
| "Gift of Love" (너 없이 행복할 수 있을까) | 2016 | 52 | KOR: 41,554 | Non-album single |
| "On The Street" (거리에서) | 2017 | — | —N/a | Sing By Me |
| "Shine On Me" (나를 비춰줘) | 2018 | — | —N/a | Non-album single |
"—" denotes release did not chart.

=== Soundtrack appearances ===
| Title | Year | Peak chart positions | Sales | Album |
| Title | Year | KOR | Sales | Album |
|---|---|---|---|---|
| "The Way We Loved" (그때 우리 사랑은) | 2014 | 25 | KOR: 73,875 | Emergency Couple OST |
| "Shout Out" (외쳐본다) | 2015 | — | —N/a | Songgot: The Piercer OST |
| "Whale's Dream" (고래의 꿈) | 2015 | — | —N/a | Bachelor's Vegetable Store (musical) OST |
| "Someday" | 2016 | — | —N/a | My Bucket List (musical) OST |
| "Round in Circles" (제자리걸음) | 2017 | — | —N/a | Introverted Boss OST |
| "Fatigue" (몸살) | 2018 | — | —N/a | Hold Me Tight OST |
"—" denotes release did not chart.

== Filmography ==
=== Variety show ===
| Year | Title | Role | Network |
|---|---|---|---|
| 2013 | Superstar K5 | Himself | Mnet |
| 2016 | Hello Counselor | Guest | KBS |

=== Television series ===
| Year | Title | Role | Network |
|---|---|---|---|
| 2015 | Songgot: The Piercer | Nam Dong-hyub | JTBC |

== Theater ==
| Year | English title | Korean title | Role | Ref. |
|---|---|---|---|---|
| 2022 | Siddhartha | 싯다르타 | Siddhartha Gautama | |

== Awards and nominations ==
| Year | Award | Category | Result |
|---|---|---|---|
| 2013 | Superstar K5 | 2nd Place | Won |
