= Superstar K 7 =

- Season 7
- Hosted by: Kim Sung-joo
- Judges: Yoon Jong-shin; Kim Bum-soo; Baek Ji-young; Sung Si-kyung
- Winner: Kevin Oh
- Runner-up: Cheon Dan-bi
- Finals venue: Kyung Hee University Grand Peace Hall

Release
- Original network: Mnet; tvN; Mnet Japan
- Original release: August 20 – November 9, 2015

Season chronology
- ← Previous; Superstar K 6 Next → Superstar K 2016

Superstar K 7 (Korean: 슈퍼스타 K7) is the seventh season of the South Korean television talent show series Superstar K, which premiered on 20 August 2015 on Mnet and aired Thursday nights at 11PM KST. Eliminations are determined in every episode, based on text message votes and online votes that are open to the entire public. The winner of Superstar K 7, Kevin Oh, received 500,000,000 won (US$470,990), a Jaguar XE, and other benefits. This was the largest prize offered in the history of the show so far, in hopes of regaining their audience share. Yoon Jong-shin, Kim Bum-soo, and Baek Ji-young returned as judges. The season also saw the addition of Sung Si-kyung as a judge following the departure of Lee Seung-chul.
