= Sea of Hope =

South Korean reality show

- Promotional poster
- Hangul: 바라던 바다
- Lit.: The Sea I Desire
- RR: Baradeon bada
- MR: Paradŏn pada
- Genre: Cooking show Reality show
- Starring: Yoon Jong-shin; Lee Ji-ah; Lee Dong-wook; Onew; Kim Go-eun
- Country of origin: South Korea
- Original language: Korean
- No. of seasons: 1
- No. of episodes: 12

Production
- Producers: Song Gwang-jong; Kwon Hye-ji; Ahn Sang-hoon
- Production locations: Pohang; Goseong
- Camera setup: Multi-camera
- Running time: 82–92 minutes

Original release
- Network: JTBC
- Release: June 29 – September 14, 2021

Sea of Hope (Korean: 바라던 바다) is a South Korean reality show program which aired on JTBC from June 29 to September 14, 2021.

== Synopsis ==
Sea of Hope is a healing show which combines three themes: sea, bar, and wish. The cast members open a bar on the sea side and offer to the customers various food, drinks and musical acts so they can escape their daily lives for a moment. Episodes 1 to 6 take place in Pohang, the remaining episodes take place in Goseong.

== Cast ==
Name	Role	Episode											
Name	Role	1	2	3	4	5	6	7	8	9	10	11	12
Yoon Jong-shin	General manager												
Lee Ji-ah	Head chef												
Lee Dong-wook	Head bartender												
Onew	Musician, chef assistant												
Kim Go-eun	Lifeguard, server												
Lee Su-hyun	Musician, bartender assistant												
Jeong Dong-hwan (MeloMance)	Musician												
Zai.Ro	Musician												
Rosé (Blackpink)	Part-time server, musician												
Sunwoo Jung-a	Part-time server, musician												
Kwon Jung-yeol (10cm)	Part-time server, musician												
Jung-in	Part-time server, musician												

== Songs performed ==
The following is the list of songs performed at the bar in chronological order.

Ep.	Song	Performers	Ref.
2	"Rollin'" (by Brave Girls)	Lee Su-hyun, Jeong Dong-hwan & Zai.Ro	
2	"Flying Deep in the Night" (by Lee Moon-sae)	Onew, Lee Su-hyun, Jeong Dong-hwan & Zai.Ro	
2	"Departure" (by Hareem)	Yoon Jong-shin, Onew, Jeong Dong-hwan & Zai.Ro	
3	"Sadness Guide" (by Kim Bum-soo)	Onew & Jeong Dong-hwan	
3	"Replay" (by Kim Dong-ryul)	Onew & Jeong Dong-hwan	
3	"Annie" (by Yoon Jong-shin)	Yoon Jong-shin, Jeong Dong-hwan & Zai.Ro	
3	"Endless Love" (by Lionel Richie & Diana Ross)	Yoon Jong-shin, Lee Su-hyun, Jeong Dong-hwan & Zai.Ro	
3	"Uphill Road" (by Jung In & Yoon Jong-shin)	Yoon Jong-shin, Onew, Lee Su-hyun, Jeong Dong-hwan & Zai.Ro	
3	"Isn't She Lovely" (by Stevie Wonder)	Yoon Jong-shin, Onew, Lee Su-hyun, Jeong Dong-hwan & Zai.Ro	
4	"Gift" (by MeloMance)	Jeong Dong-hwan, Onew & Zai.Ro	
4	"The Road to Me" (by Sung Si-kyung)	Onew, Jeong Dong-hwan & Zai.Ro	
4	"The Only Exception" (by Paramore)	Rosé, Jeong Dong-hwan & Zai.Ro	
4	"Beach Again" (by SSAK3)	Lee Su-hyun, Jeong Dong-hwan & Zai.Ro	
4	"Expectation" (by Na Yoon-kwon)	Onew & Jeong Dong-hwan	
4	"A Doll's Dream" (by Weather Forecast)	Onew, Lee Su-hyun & Jeong Dong-hwan	
4	"Because I Love You" (by Yoo Jae-ha)	Rosé & Jeong Dong-hwan	
5	"Myself Reflected in My Heart" (by Yoo Jae-ha)	Lee Su-hyun & Jeong Dong-hwan	
5	"The Blue Night of Jeju Island" (by Choi Sung-won)	Jeong Dong-hwan & Zai.Ro	
5	"Starry Night" (by Onew & Lee Jin-ah)	Onew, Lee Su-hyun, Jeong Dong-hwan & Zai.Ro	
5	"Lucky" (by Jason Mraz & Colbie Caillat)	Onew, Rosé, Jeong Dong-hwan & Zai.Ro	
5	"If I Ain't Got You" (by Alicia Keys)	Onew, Lee Su-hyun, Rosé & Jeong Dong-hwan	
5	"Flying Deep in the Night" (by Lee Moon-sae)	Onew, Lee Su-hyun, Rosé, Jeong Dong-hwan & Zai.Ro	
6	"Behind You" (by J. Y. Park)	Onew & Jeong Dong-hwan	
6	"Beach Mood Song" (by Yoon Jong-shin)	Yoon Jong-shin, Lee Su-hyun, Rosé, Jeong Dong-hwan & Zai.Ro	
6	"If" (by Bread)	Lee Su-hyun, Jeong Dong-hwan & Zai.Ro	
6	"Let's Go See the Stars" (by Jukjae)	Onew, Jeong Dong-hwan & Zai.Ro	
6	"Read My Mind" (by The Killers)	Rosé, Jeong Dong-hwan & Zai.Ro	
6	"The Blue in You" (by Lee So-ra & Kim Hyun-chul)	Yoon Jong-shin, Onew, Lee Su-hyun, Jeong Dong-hwan & Zai.Ro	
6	"Lovely Day" (by Bill Withers)	Lee Su-hyun, Yoon Jong-shin, Onew, Rosé, Jeong Dong-hwan & Zai.Ro	
6	"Time Walking on Memories" (by Nell)	Rosé, Onew, Jeong Dong-hwan & Zai.Ro	
6	"Gone" (by Rosé)	Rosé & Zai.Ro	
7	"My Other Side" (by Bong Tae-kyu)	Onew & Jeong Dong-hwan	
7	"Like It" (by Yoon Jong-shin)	Yoon Jong-shin & Jeong Dong-hwan	
7	"Run With Me" (by Sunwoo Jung-a)	Sunwoo Jung-a & Jeong Dong-hwan	
7	"Selene 6.23" (by Shinee)	Sunwoo Jung-a, Onew & Jeong Dong-hwan	
7	"That I Was Once By Your Side" (by Toy)	Lee Su-hyun & Jeong Dong-hwan	
8	"Fly Me to the Moon" (by Frank Sinatra & Count Basie)	Sunwoo Jung-a & Jeong Dong-hwan	
8	"My One and Only Love" (by Frank Sinatra)	Sunwoo Jung-a & Jeong Dong-hwan	
8	"Spring Girls" (by Sunwoo Jung-a)	Sunwoo Jung-a, Lee Su-hyun & Jeong Dong-hwan	
8	"On the Street" (by Sung Si-kyung)	Yoon Jong-shin & Jeong Dong-hwan	
8	"I Don't Know Anything But Love" (by Sim Soo-bong)	Sunwoo Jung-a & Jeong Dong-hwan	
8	"The Girl from Ipanema" (by Stan Getz & João Gilberto)	Sunwoo Jung-a, Jeong Dong-hwan & Zai.Ro	
8	"Thick Rice Wine" (by Yoon Jong-shin)	Yoon Jong-shin, Jeong Dong-hwan & Zai.Ro	
8	"I Miss You" (by Kim Bum-soo)	Onew & Jeong Dong-hwan	
8	"Cat" (by Sunwoo Jung-a (ft. IU))	Lee Su-hyun, Sunwoo Jung-a, Jeong Dong-hwan & Zai.Ro	
8	"Saying I Love You Again" (by Kim Dong-ryul)	Onew & Jeong Dong-hwan	
9	"Merry-G-Round" (by Joe Hisaishi)	Jeong Dong-hwan	
9	"Lie Lie Lie" (by Lee Juck)	Onew, Jeong Dong-hwan & Zai.Ro	
9	"Stay Put" (by Sunwoo Jung-a)	Sunwoo Jung-a	
9	"Saving All My Love for You" (by Billy Davis Jr. & Marilyn McCoo)	Lee Su-hyun, Jeong Dong-hwan & Zai.Ro	
9	"Exhausted" (by Yoon Jong-shin, Kwak Jin-eon & Kim Feel)	Yoon Jong-shin, Jeong Dong-hwan & Zai.Ro	
9	"City of Stars" (by Ryan Gosling & Emma Stone)	Lee Dong-wook, Lee Su-hyun & Jeong Dong-hwan	

== Ratings ==
Average TV viewership ratings
Ep.	Original broadcast date	Average audience share
1	June 29, 2021	1.482%
2	July 6, 2021	1.394%
3	July 13, 2021	1.379%
4	July 20, 2021	1.357%
5	July 27, 2021	1.648%
6	August 3, 2021	1.378%
7	August 10, 2021	1.11%
8	August 17, 2021	0.982%
9	August 24, 2021	1.667%
10	August 31, 2021	0.922%
11	September 7, 2021	0.968%
12	September 14, 2021	0.914%

- In this table below, the blue numbers represent the lowest ratings and the red numbers represent the highest ratings.

== International versions ==
Country	Local Name	Cast	Network	Year Aired
Vietnam	Biển của hy vọng	Isaac, Đức Phúc, Hoà Minzy, Tiên Cookie, Quân A.P, Chế Nguyễn Quỳnh Châu, Nguyễn Phương Nhi	Viettel Media, HTV	December 15, 2022 – present
