= List of awards and nominations received by BOL4 =

BOL4 awards and nominations
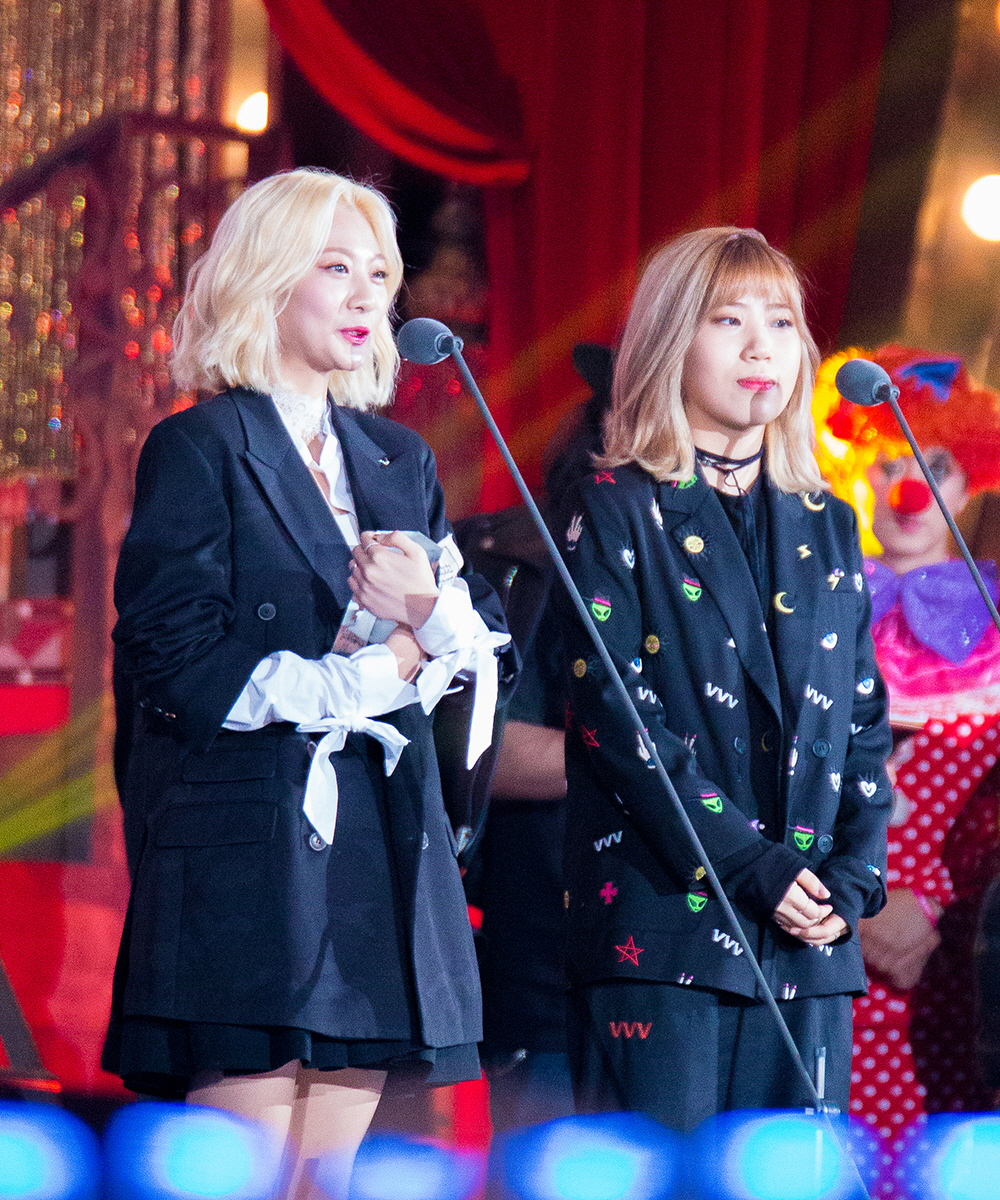
- BOL4 at Melon Music Awards on November 19, 2016
Awards and nominations
Award	Wins	Nominations
Asia Artist Awards	1	1
Gaon Chart Music Awards	3	9
Genie Music Awards	0	9
Golden Disc Awards	3	12
Korean Music Awards	1	3
Melon Music Awards	4	18
Mnet Asian Music Awards	2	11
Seoul Music Awards	1	12
Soribada Best K-Music Awards	1	5

Totals (Note: Certain award groups do not simply award one winner. They acknowledge several different recipients, have runners-up, and have third place. Since this is a specific recognition and is different from losing an award, runner-up mentions are considered wins in this award tally. For simplification and to avoid errors, each award in this list has been presumed to have had a prior nomination.)
- Wins: 16
- Nominations: 80

These are the list of awards and nominations received by South Korean musical act BOL4, formed by Shofar Music in 2016 after appearing on Superstar K6 in 2014.

== Awards and nominations ==
Name of the award ceremony, year presented, category, nominee of the award, and the result of the nomination
Award ceremony	Year	Category	Nominee / work	Result	Ref.
Asia Artist Awards	2017	Best Entertainer Award (Music Category)	BOL4	Won	
Gaon Chart Music Awards	2016	Song of the Year – December	"Tell Me You Love Me"	Nominated	
Gaon Chart Music Awards	2016	Indie Discovery of the Year	BOL4	Won	
Gaon Chart Music Awards	2017	Song of the Year – June	"We Loved"	Nominated	
Gaon Chart Music Awards	2017	Song of the Year – September	"Some"	Nominated	
Gaon Chart Music Awards	2018	Song of the Year – January	"#First Love" (with Dingo)	Nominated	
Gaon Chart Music Awards	2018	Song of the Year – May	"Travel"	Won	
Gaon Chart Music Awards	2019	Song of the Year – April	"Bom"	Won	
Gaon Chart Music Awards	2019	Song of the Year – April	"Stars Over Me"	Nominated	
Gaon Chart Music Awards	2019	Song of the Year – September	"Workaholic"	Nominated	
Gaon Chart Music Awards	2020	Artist of the Year – Digital Music (May)	"Leo" (Feat. Baekhyun)	Nominated	
Genie Music Awards	2018	Best Digital Album of the Year	Red Diary Page.2	Nominated	
Genie Music Awards	2018	The Top Music	"Travel"	Nominated	
Genie Music Awards	2018	The Vocal Artist (Female)	"Travel"	Nominated	
Genie Music Awards	2018	The Top Best Selling Artist	Bolbbalgan4	Nominated	
Genie Music Awards	2018	Genie Music Popularity Award	Bolbbalgan4	Nominated	
Genie Music Awards	2019	The Top Artist	Bolbbalgan4	Nominated	
Genie Music Awards	2019	The Female Group	Bolbbalgan4	Nominated	
Genie Music Awards	2019	Genie Music Popularity Award	Bolbbalgan4	Nominated	
Genie Music Awards	2019	Global Popularity Award	Bolbbalgan4	Nominated	
Golden Disc Awards	2016	Rookie of the Year	Bolbbalgan4	Won	
Golden Disc Awards	2016	Popularity Award	Bolbbalgan4	Nominated	
Golden Disc Awards	2016	Asian Choice Popularity Award	Bolbbalgan4	Nominated	
Golden Disc Awards	2017	Digital Daesang	"Tell Me You Love Me"	Nominated	
Golden Disc Awards	2017	Digital Bonsang	"Tell Me You Love Me"	Won	
Golden Disc Awards	2017	Genie Popularity Award	Bolbbalgan4	Nominated	
Golden Disc Awards	2017	Global Popularity Award	Bolbbalgan4	Nominated	
Golden Disc Awards	2018	Digital Daesang	"Travel"	Nominated	
Golden Disc Awards	2018	Digital Bonsang	"Travel"	Won	
Golden Disc Awards	2018	Popularity Award	BOL4	Nominated	
Golden Disc Awards	2018	NetEase Music Global Star Popularity Award	BOL4	Nominated	
Golden Disc Awards	2019	Digital Bonsang	"Bom"	Nominated	
Golden Disc Awards	2020	Digital Bonsang	"Leo" (with Baekhyun)	Nominated	
Korean Music Awards	2017	Song of the Year	"Galaxy"	Won	
Korean Music Awards	2017	Best Pop Song	"Galaxy"	Nominated	
Korean Music Awards	2017	New Artist of the Year	Bolbbalgan4	Nominated	
Melon Music Awards	2016	Best New Artist Award	Bolbbalgan4	Nominated	
Melon Music Awards	2016	Best Indie	"Galaxy"	Won	
Melon Music Awards	2017	Album of the Year (Daesang)	Red Diary Page.1	Nominated	
Melon Music Awards	2017	Song of the Year (Daesang)	"Tell Me You Love Me"	Nominated	
Melon Music Awards	2017	Best Artist Award	BOL4	Nominated	
Melon Music Awards	2017	Top 10 Artist	BOL4	Won	
Melon Music Awards	2017	Kakao Hot Star Award	BOL4	Nominated	
Melon Music Awards	2017	Best Rap / Hip Hop	"Lost Without You" (Mad Clown ft. Bolbbalgan4)	Nominated	
Melon Music Awards	2017	Best OST	"You and I From the Beginning"	Nominated	
Melon Music Awards	2018	Album of the Year (Daesang)	Red Diary Page.2	Nominated	
Melon Music Awards	2018	Song of the Year (Daesang)	"Travel"	Nominated	
Melon Music Awards	2018	Best Artist Award	BOL4	Nominated	
Melon Music Awards	2018	Top 10 Artist	BOL4	Won	
Melon Music Awards	2018	Kakao Hot Star Award	BOL4	Nominated	
Melon Music Awards	2019	Album of the Year (Daesang)	Puberty Book I Bom	Nominated	
Melon Music Awards	2019	Song of the Year (Daesang)	"Bom"	Nominated	
Melon Music Awards	2019	Best Artist Award	BOL4	Nominated	
Melon Music Awards	2019	Top 10 Artist	BOL4	Won	
Melon Music Awards	2020	Album of the Year (Daesang)	"Puberty Book II Pum"	Nominated	
Melon Music Awards	2020	Best Indie Award	"Leo" (with Baekhyun)	Won	
Mnet Asian Music Awards	2016	Artist of the Year	Bolbbalgan4	Nominated	
Mnet Asian Music Awards	2016	Best New Female Artist	Bolbbalgan4	Nominated	
Mnet Asian Music Awards	2017	Artist of the Year	Bolbbalgan4	Nominated	
Mnet Asian Music Awards	2017	Song of the Year	"Tell Me You Love Me"	Nominated	
Mnet Asian Music Awards	2017	Best Vocal Performance – Group	"Tell Me You Love Me"	Won	
Mnet Asian Music Awards	2017	Best OST	"You and I From the Beginning"	Nominated	
Mnet Asian Music Awards	2018	Song of the Year	"Travel"	Nominated	
Mnet Asian Music Awards	2018	Best Vocal Performance – Group	"Travel"	Nominated	
Mnet Asian Music Awards	2019	Song of the Year	"Bom"	Nominated	
Mnet Asian Music Awards	2019	Best Vocal Performance – Group	"Bom"	Won	
Mnet Asian Music Awards	2019	Worldwide Fans' Choice Top 10	BOL4	Nominated	
Mnet Asian Music Awards	2020	Best Collaboration	"Leo" (with Baekhyun)	Nominated	
Mnet Asian Music Awards	2020	Song of the Year	"Leo" (with Baekhyun)	Nominated	
Seoul Music Awards	2017	Daesang Award	BOL4	Nominated	
Seoul Music Awards	2017	Bonsang Award	BOL4	Won	
Seoul Music Awards	2017	Popularity Award	BOL4	Nominated	
Seoul Music Awards	2017	Hallyu Special Award	BOL4	Nominated	
Seoul Music Awards	2018	Bonsang Award	BOL4	Nominated	
Seoul Music Awards	2018	Popularity Award	BOL4	Nominated	
Seoul Music Awards	2018	Hallyu Special Award	BOL4	Nominated	
Seoul Music Awards	2019	Bonsang Award	BOL4	Nominated	
Seoul Music Awards	2019	Ballad Award	Two Five	Nominated	
Seoul Music Awards	2019	Popularity Award	BOL4	Nominated	
Seoul Music Awards	2019	Hallyu Special Award	BOL4	Nominated	
Seoul Music Awards	2019	QQ Music Most Popular K-Pop Artist Award	BOL4	Nominated	
Seoul Music Awards	2020	Bonsang Award	"Puberty Book II Pum"	Nominated	
Soribada Best K-Music Awards	2018	Daesang Award	Bolbbalgan4	Nominated	
Soribada Best K-Music Awards	2018	Bonsang Award	Bolbbalgan4	Won	
Soribada Best K-Music Awards	2018	Popularity Award (Female)	Bolbbalgan4	Nominated	
Soribada Best K-Music Awards	2019	Bonsang Award	Bolbbalgan4	Nominated	
Soribada Best K-Music Awards	2019	Popularity Award (Female)	Bolbbalgan4	Nominated	

== Other accolades ==
=== Listicles ===
Name of publisher, year listed, name of listicle, and placement
Publisher	Year	Listicle	Placement	Ref.
Forbes	2018	Korea Power Celebrity	39th	
