= Music Farm =

(The) Music Farm may refer to:

- Music Farm (label), a Korean pop record label, founded as Farm Entertainment in 2001
- Music Farm (music venue), in Charleston, South Carolina, which opened in 1991
- Music Farm (TV series), an Italian reality show hosted by Simona Ventura from 2004 to 2006
- Music Farm Studio, recording studio in New South Wales, Australia
