= Walking With =

Walking With may refer to:

- Walking With (album), an album by Kim Dong-ryool
- Walking with..., a series of TV shows produced by the BBC
