= BOL4 =

South Korean band

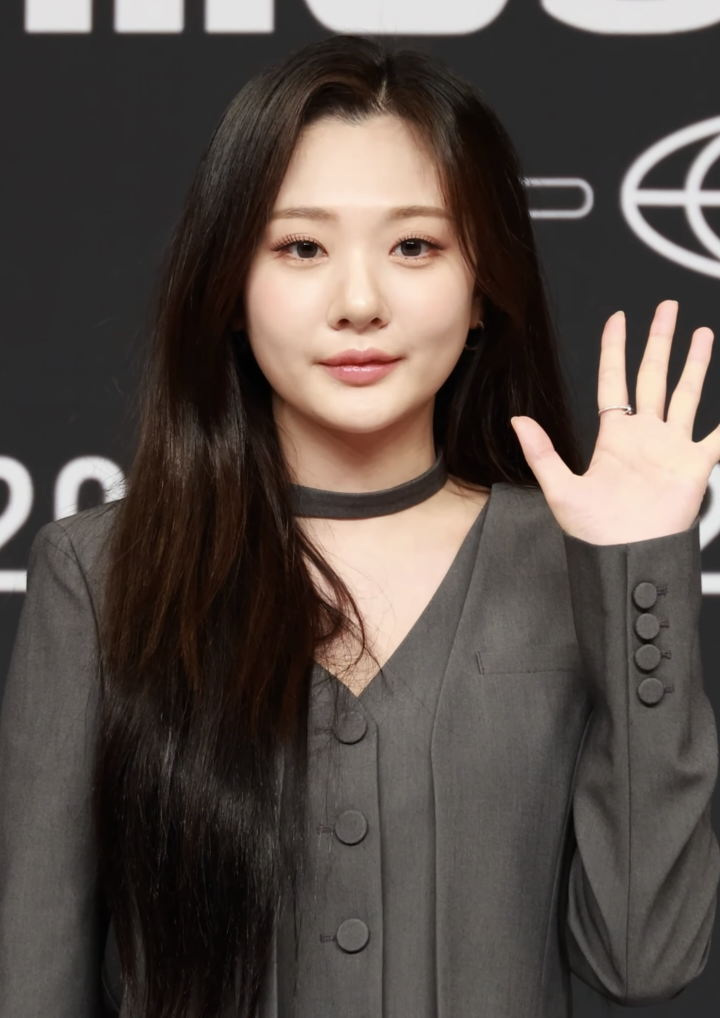
- BOL4 in November 2025

Background information
- Also known as: Bolbbalgan4; Blushing Youth
- Origin: Yeongju, Gyeongsang, South Korea
- Genres: K-pop; folk rock; Rhythm & Blues; Indie pop
- Years active: 2016–present
- Labels: Shofar Music; King Records
- Members: Ahn Ji-young
- Past members: Woo Ji-yoon
- Website: www.shofar-ent.com; bol4.jp

BOL4 (Korean: 볼빨간 사춘기; RR: Bolppalgan Sachungi), also known as Bolbbalgan4 or Blushing Youth (赤頬思春期, Akahō Shishunki), is a South Korean musical act formed by Shofar Music in 2016. They appeared on Superstar K6 in 2014 before signing a contract with their current agency. BOL4 was originally a duo consisting of Ahn Ji-young and Woo Ji-yoon. They debuted with the single "Fight Day" from the mini-album Red Ickle on April 22, 2016.

The duo went on a temporary hiatus due to Ahn's music classes requirements in the first half of 2018. BOL4 signed with King Records and debuted in Japan on June 5, 2019, with the mini-album Red Planet (Japan Edition).

On April 2, 2020, Shofar Music announced that Woo Ji-yoon had left the duo and that Ahn Ji-young will continue to promote as BOL4. In April 2025, BOL4 parted ways with their agency after 10 years of working with them.

== Name ==
The group's name in English comes from the first syllable of the Korean word sachungi ("puberty"), which is pronounced the same as the Sino-Korean numeral four (sa).

== Formation ==
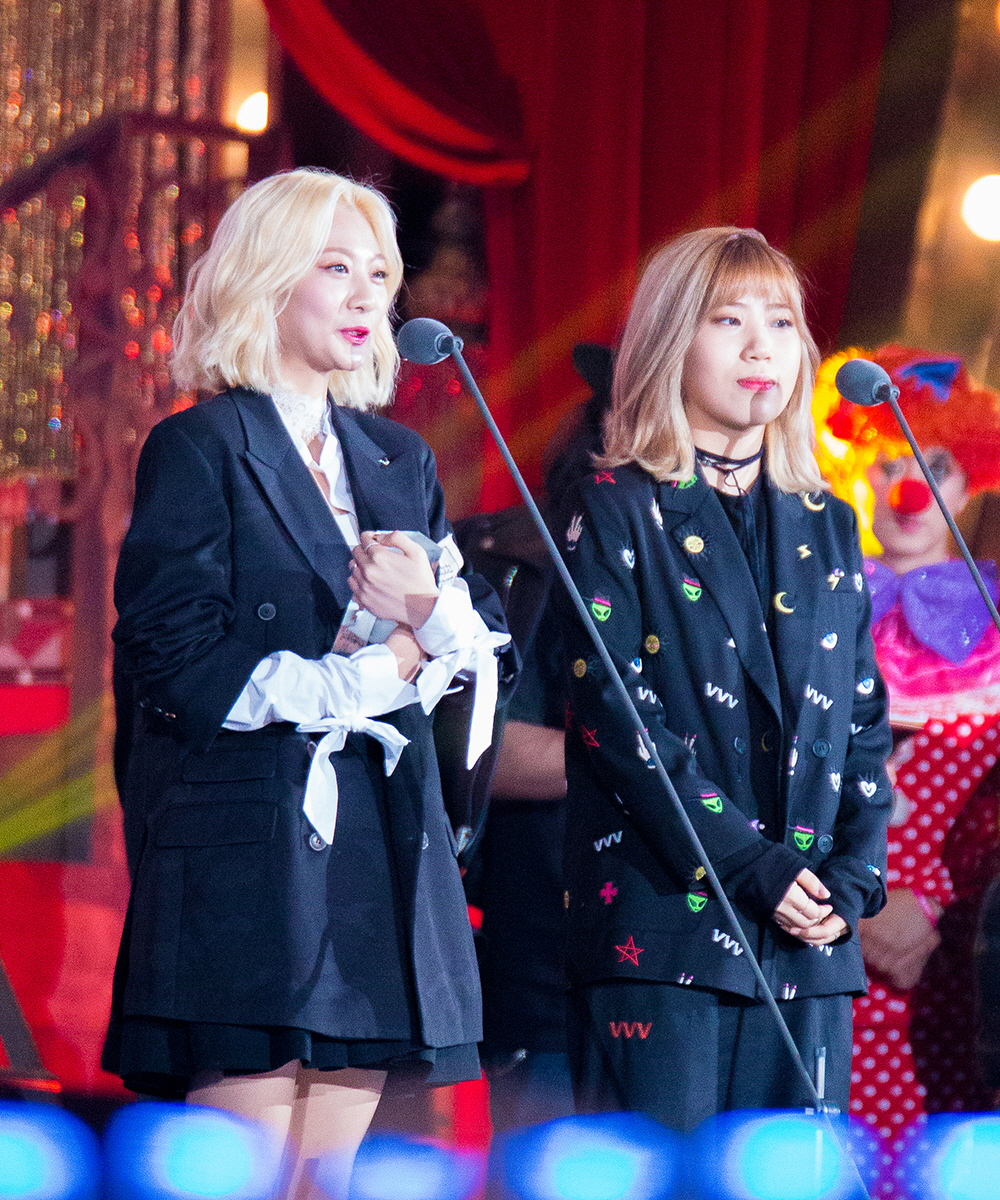
BOL4 in 2016

Ahn Ji-young and Woo Ji-yoon were both raised in Yeongju, North Gyeongsang Province, and were classmates. They had previously competed on Superstar K 6 in 2014. Since they were young, they had dreamed of becoming singers. The name of their duo was chosen because they wanted to make the kind of pure, honest music that can only be found in adolescence. Woo portrays the "blushing" part of the name because she is often shy, while Ahn portrays "youth" because she acts like an adolescent girl.

== Members ==
=== Current ===
- Ahn Ji-young (안지영) – main vocals

=== Former ===
- Woo Ji-yoon (우지윤) – guitar, rapping, backing vocals

== Discography ==
=== Studio albums ===
Title	Album details	Peak chart positions	Sales
Title	Album details	KOR	Sales
Red Planet	Released: August 29, 2016; Label: Shofar Music; Formats: CD, digital download, streaming; Track listing: 1. "Galaxy" (우주를 줄게); 2. "Fight Day" (싸운날); 3. "You (=I)"; 4. "Grumpy" (심술); 5. "Hard to Love" (나만 안되는 연애); 6. "Chocolate" (초콜릿); 7. "Freesia" (프리지아); 8. "X Song"; 9. "Ring" (반지); 10. "When You Fall in Love" (사랑에 빠졌을 때)	15	KOR: 25,646

=== Extended plays ===
Title	EP details	Peak chart positions				Sales
Title	EP details	KOR	JPN	JPN Hot	US World	Sales
Korean
Red Ickle	Released: April 22, 2016; Label: Shofar Music; Formats: CD, digital download, streaming; Track listing: 1. "Chocolate" (초콜릿); 2. "Fight Day" (싸운날); 3. "Ring" (반지); 4. "Grumpy" (심술); 5. "Occasionally" (가끔씩)	30	—	—	—	KOR: 659
Red Diary Page.1	Released: September 28, 2017; Label: Shofar Music; Formats: CD, digital download, streaming; Track listing: 1. "Some" (썸탈꺼야); 2. "Blue"; 3. "Fix Me" (고쳐주세요); 4. "Imagine" (상상); 5. "To My Youth" (나의 사춘기에게)	7	—	—	9	KOR: 13,277
Red Diary Page.2	Released: May 25, 2018; Label: Shofar Music; Formats: CD, digital download, streaming; Track listing: 1. "Wind" (바람사람); 2. "Travel" (여행); 3. "Starlight" (야경); 4. "Dear. Teddy Bear" (안녕, 곰인형); 5. "Clip"; 6. "Lonely"	5	—	—	—	KOR: 8,375
Puberty Book I Bom	Released: April 2, 2019; Label: Shofar Music; Formats: CD, digital download, streaming; Track listing: 1. "Picnic" (나들이 갈까); 2. "Bom" (나만, 봄); 3. "Stars Over Me" (별 보러 갈래?); 4. "Seattle Alone"; 5. "Mermaid"	16	—	—	—	KOR: 5,689
Two Five	Released: September 10, 2019; Label: Shofar Music; Formats: CD, digital download, streaming; Track listing: 1. "Workaholic" (워커홀릭); 2. "25"; 3. "XX"; 4. "Taste"; 5. "Day Off" (낮(Day off)); 6. "XX" (acoustic ver.)	6	—	—	—	KOR: 5,162
Puberty Book II Pum	Released: May 13, 2020; Label: Shofar Music; Formats: CD, digital download, streaming; Track listing: 1. "Blank" (빈칸을 채워주시오); 2. "Hug" (품); 3. "Leo" (나비와 고양이) (feat. Baekhyun of Exo); 4. "Counseling" (카운슬링); 5. "Dandelion" (민들레)	8	—	—	—	KOR: 5,536
Seoul	Released: April 20, 2022; Label: Shofar Music; Formats: CD, digital download, streaming; Track listing: 1. "Love Story"; 2. "Seoul"; 3. "What Makes Us Beautiful" (이름디운 건); 4. "In the Mirror"; 5. "Star" (별)	26	—	—	—	
Love.zip (사랑.zip)	Released: April 16, 2023; Label: Shofar Music; Formats: CD, digital download, streaming; Track listing: 1. "Chase Love Hard" (featuring Hwang Min-hyun); 2. "Friend the End"; 3. "Rome"; 4. "When Love Becomes Goodbye" (사랑이 이별이 돼 가는 모습이); 5. "Good Night" (좋은 꿈 꿔 0224.mp3)	42	—	—	—	KOR: 5,074
Merry Go Round	Released: December 12, 2023; Label: Shofar Music; Formats: CD, digital download, streaming; Track listing: 1. "Goodbye My Love"; 2. "Snowball" (스노우볼); 3. "Eternal Love" (사랑할 수밖에); 4. "Miss U, Dear"; 5. "Love"	22	—	—	—	KOR: 3,788
October Archive	Released: October 22, 2026; Label: Kanverse; Formats: CD, digital download, streaming; Track listing: 1. "Quebec" (퀘벡); 2. "Golden Hour" (황금기); 3. "Full Count" (풀카운트); 4. "October" (새벽 공기); 5. "Paper Plane" (고양이 별)	—	—	—	—	
Japanese
Red Planet (Japan Edition)	Released: June 5, 2019; Label: King Records; Formats: CD, digital download, streaming; Track listing: 1. "Galaxy" (宇宙をあげる); 2. "好きだと言って"; 3. "喧嘩した日"; 4. "You (=I)"; 5. "Grumpy" (意地悪); 6. "私だけダメな恋"	—	41	63	—	JPN: 1,130
"—" denotes releases that did not chart or were not released in that region.

=== Singles ===
==== As lead artist ====
Title	Year	Peak chart positions			Sales (Note: Gaon Chart no longer releases download sales figures from January 2018 onwards.)	Certifications (Note: In April 2018, Gaon Chart introduced music recording certifications for albums, downloads and streamings.)	Album
Title	Year	KOR	KOR Songs (Note: Includes the Billboard K-pop Hot 100 (discontinued since April 30, 2022), and the subsequent South Korea Songs chart (launched in May 7, 2022).)	JPN	Sales	Certifications	Album
Korean
"Fight Day" (싸운날)	2016	—	*	—	KOR: 16,260	—N/a	Red Ickle
"Galaxy" (우주를 줄게)	2016	2	36	—	KOR: 2,716,160	—N/a	Red Planet
"Hard to Love" (나만 안되는 연애)	2016	12	46	—	KOR: 2,500,000	—N/a	Red Planet
"Tell Me You Love Me" (좋다고 말해) (Note: Hidden track from Red Planet album)	2016	2	19	—	KOR: 2,500,000	—N/a	Red Planet
"Some" (썸 탈꺼야)	2017	1	1	—	KOR: 2,500,000	—N/a	Red Diary Page.1
"To My Youth" (나의 사춘기에게)	2017	3	2	—	KOR: 2,500,000	—N/a	Red Diary Page.1
"#First Love" (#첫사랑)	2018	2	2	—	—N/a	—N/a	Non-album single
"Travel" (여행)	2018	1	1	—	KOR: 2,500,000	KMCA: Platinum (Note: "Travel" was certified 2× Platinum for surpassing 200 million streams in February 2023.) (Note: "Travel" was certified Platinum for surpassing 2.5 million downloads in April 2019.)	Red Diary Page.2
"Wind" (바람사람)	2018	20	36	—	—N/a	—N/a	Red Diary Page.2
"Dejavu"	2018	21	30	—	—N/a	—N/a	Red Diary 'Hidden Track'
"Bom" (나만, 봄)	2019	1	4	—	—N/a	KMCA: Platinum (Note: "Bom" was certified platinum for 100 million streaming in June 11, 2020)	Puberty Book I Bom
"Stars Over Me" (별 보러 갈래?)	2019	4	10	—	—N/a	—N/a	Puberty Book I Bom
"Mermaid"	2019	22	30	—	—N/a	—N/a	Puberty Book I Bom
"Workaholic" (워커홀릭)	2019	1	2	—	—N/a	—N/a	Two Five
"Leo" (나비와 고양이) (featuring Baekhyun)	2020	2	3	—	—N/a	—N/a	Puberty Book II Pum
"Hug" (품)	2020	30	19	—	—N/a	—N/a	Puberty Book II Pum
"Atlantis Princess" (아틀란티스 소녀)	2020	36	26	—	—N/a	—N/a	Our Beloved BoA #2 – SM Station
"Dancing Cartoon"	2020	49	—	—	—N/a	—N/a	Filmlet
"Butterfly Effect" (나비효과)	2021	23	37	—	—N/a	—N/a	Butterfly Effect
"Space" (너는 내 세상이었어)	2021	32	14	—	—N/a	—N/a	Butterfly Effect
"Seoul"	2022	18	99	—	—N/a	—N/a	Seoul
"Friend the End"	2023	15	—	—	—N/a	—N/a	Love.zip
"Chase Love Hard" (featuring Hwang Min-hyun)	2023	36	—	—	—N/a	—N/a	Love.zip
"Someday" (여름날) (featuring Ha Hyun-sang)	2023	84	—	—	—N/a	—N/a	Non-album single
"Snowball" (스노우볼)	2023	76	—	—	—N/a	—N/a	Merry Go Round
"Lips" (featuring Giselle)	2024	102	—	—	—N/a	—N/a	Non-album singles
"Bloom"	2024	110	—	—	—N/a	—N/a	Non-album singles
"Find You"	2026	— (Note: "Find You" did not enter the Circle Digital Chart, but debuted and peaked at number 18 on the component Circle Download Chart.)	—	—	—N/a	—N/a	Non-album singles
"Please Summer!" (여름아 부탁해)	2026	9	—	—	—N/a	—N/a	Non-album singles
"Golden Hour" (황금기)	2026	— (Note: "Golden Hour" did not enter the Circle Digital Chart, but debuted and peaked at number 24 on the component Circle Download Chart.)	—	—	—N/a	—N/a	October Archive
"Full Count" (풀카운트)	2026	— (Note: "Full Count" did not enter the Circle Digital Chart, but debuted and peaked at number 39 on the component Circle Download Chart.)	—	—	—N/a	—N/a	October Archive
Japanese
"Uchū o Ageru" (宇宙をあげる)	2019	—	—	—	—N/a	—N/a	Red Planet (Japan Edition)
"Watashi no Shishunki e" (私の思春期へ)	2019	—	—	—	—N/a	—N/a	Non-album singles
"Some"	2019	—	—	—	—N/a	—N/a	Non-album singles
"Love"	2020	—	—	48	JPN: 720 (Phy.)	—N/a	Non-album singles
"Watashi dake, Haru" (私だけ、春)	2020	—	—	—	—N/a	—N/a	Non-album singles
"—" denotes releases that did not chart or were not released in that region.

==== Collaborations ====
Title	Year	Peak chart positions		Sales	Album
Title	Year	KOR	KOR Hot	Sales	Album
"Romantic Wish" (with Sweden Laundry, Vanilla Acoustic, Kim Ji-soo, Kim Sa-rang, 20 Years Of Age and Letter Flow)	2016	—	—N/a	—N/a	Non-album singles
"We Loved" (남이 될 수 있을까) (with 20 Years of Age)	2017	1	4	KOR: 2,500,000	Non-album singles
"New York" (with WH3N)	2019	107	—	—N/a	Non-album singles
"Awkward" (어색한 사이) (with Vanilla Acoustic, Sweden Laundry, 20 Years of Age, Letter Flow, Kim Ji-soo, WH3N, Boramiyu, Choi Yuri)	2020	116	—	—N/a	Non-album singles
"—" denotes releases that did not chart or were not released in that region.

==== As featured artist ====
Title	Year	Peak chart positions		Sales	Album
Title	Year	KOR	KOR Hot	Sales	Album
"Lost Without You" (우리집을 못 찾겠군요) (Mad Clown feat. Bolbbalgan4)	2017	5	77	KOR: 1,012,764	Love Is a Dog from Hell
"Mohae" (모해) (San E feat. Bolbbalgan4)	2017	5	23	KOR: 260,140	Non-album singles
"Hurry Up" (Sohee feat. BOL4)	2018	— (Note: "Hurry Up" did not enter the Gaon Digital Chart, but debuted and peaked at number 100 on the component Gaon BGM Chart.)	—	—N/a	Non-album singles
"Be Your Christmas" (Sweden Laundry feat. BOL4)	2018	—	—	—N/a	Be Your Christmas
"—" denotes releases that did not chart or were not released in that region.

=== Soundtrack appearances ===
Title	Year	Peak chart positions		Sales	Album
Title	Year	KOR	KOR Hot	Sales	Album
"Hidden Path" (가리워진 길)	2014	60	—N/a	KOR: 55,979	Misaeng OST Part 4
"Dream" (드림)	2016	54	—N/a	KOR: 47,657	Hwarang OST Part 3
"Hello"	2016	—	—N/a	—N/a	Lost Tale Mobile Game OST
"You and I From the Beginning" (처음부터 너와 나)	2017	3	10	KOR: 2,500,000	The Emperor: Owner of the Mask OST Part 2
"My Trouble"	2018	48	52	—N/a	Why: The Real Reason You Got Dumped OST Part 1
"Love Letter"	2020	95	—N/a	—N/a	Start-Up OST Part 12
"Someday"	2026	— (Note: "Someday" did not enter the Circle Digital Chart, but debuted and peaked at number 30 on the component Circle Download Chart.)	—N/a	—N/a	Sold Out on You OST Part 6
"—" denotes releases that did not chart or were not released in that region.

=== Other charted songs ===
Title	Year	Peak chart positions		Sales	Album
Title	Year	KOR	KOR Hot	Sales	Album
"Grumpy" (심술) (Red Ickle version)	2016	38	94	KOR: 1,052,943	Red Ickle
"You(=I)"	2016	40	74	KOR: 1,371,749	Red Planet
"When You Fall in Love" (사랑에 빠졌을 때)	2016	78	—N/a	KOR: 66,307	Red Planet
"Grumpy" (심술) (Red Planet version)	2016	83	—N/a	KOR: 69,098	Red Planet
"Blue"	2017	5	7	KOR: 757,087	Red Diary Page.1
"Fix Me" (고쳐주세요)	2017	11	11	KOR: 467,335	Red Diary Page.1
"Imagine" (상상)	2017	12	12	KOR: 399,631	Red Diary Page.1
"Lonely"	2018	24	40	—N/a	Red Diary Page.2
"Starlight" (야경)	2018	34	43	—N/a	Red Diary Page.2
"Dear, Teddy Bear" (안녕, 곰인형)	2018	42	52	—N/a	Red Diary Page.2
"Clip"	2018	65	66	—N/a	Red Diary Page.2
"6 o'clock"	2018	80	84	—N/a	Red Diary 'Hidden Track'
"Picnic" (나들이 갈까)	2019	31	39	—N/a	Puberty Book I Bom
"Seattle Alone"	2019	43	49	—N/a	Puberty Book I Bom
"25"	2019	33	—N/a	—N/a	Two Five
"XX"	2019	30	—N/a	—N/a	Two Five
"Taste"	2019	50	—N/a	—N/a	Two Five
"Day Off" (낮)	2019	59	—N/a	—N/a	Two Five
"XX" (acoustic version)	2019	117	—N/a	—N/a	Two Five
"Blank" (빈칸을 채워주시오)	2020	108	—N/a	—N/a	Puberty Book II Pum
"Dandelion" (민들레)	2020	143	—N/a	—N/a	Puberty Book II Pum
"Counseling" (카운슬링)	2020	164	—N/a	—N/a	Puberty Book II Pum
"Red Lipstick" (빨간 립스틱)	2020	31	—N/a	—N/a	Filmlet
"Love Story"	2022	16	—N/a	—N/a	Seoul
"What Makes Us Beautiful" (아름다운 건)	2022	187	—N/a	—N/a	Seoul
"Star" (별)	2022	186	—N/a	—N/a	Seoul
"Rome"	2023	158	—N/a	—N/a	Love.zip
"When Love Becomes Goodbye" (사랑이 이별이 돼 가는 모습이)	2023	77	—N/a	—N/a	Love.zip
"Good Night" (좋은 꿈 꿔 0224.mp3)	2023	180	—N/a	—N/a	Love.zip
"Eternal Love" (사랑할 수밖에)	2023	33	—N/a	—N/a	Merry Go Round

== Concert and tours ==
=== Headlining concerts and tours ===
- BOL4 1st Solo Concert "Red Planet" (2016)
- BOL4 1st Concert in Taipei (2017)
- BOL4 2nd Solo Concert "Imagine" (2017–2018)
- BOL4 3rd Solo Concert "Travel" (2018)
- BOL4 Spring Solo Concert "Flower Energy" (2019)
- BOL4 Asia Tour "Blossom" (2019)
- BOL4 Tour Concert "Two Five" (2019)
- BOL4 (赤頬思春期) Japan Live Tour "Love" (2020)
- BOL4 Concert "Seoul" (2022)
- BOL4 Concert in Taipei (2023)
- BOL4 Concert "Love.zip" (2023)
- BOL4 Asia Tour "Love.zip" (2023)
- BOL4 Concert "Bloom" (2024)
- BOL4 Asia Tour "Bloom" (2025)
- BOL4 Concert Tour "Red Square" (2026–2027)

==== BOL4 1st Solo Concert "Red Planet" (2016) ====
Concert	Date	City	Country	Venue
Red Planet No. B41120	November 20, 2016	Seoul	South Korea	Baekam Art Hall
Red Planet No. B4120304	December 3, 2016	Seoul	South Korea	Ewha Womans University (Samsung Hall)
Red Planet No. B4120304	December 4, 2016	Seoul	South Korea	Ewha Womans University (Samsung Hall)

==== BOL4 1st Concert in Taipei (2017) ====
Date	City	Country	Venue	Attendance
September 9, 2017	Taipei	Taiwan	Legacy Taipei	2,300

==== BOL4 2nd Solo Concert "Imagine" (2017–2018) ====
Date	City	Country	Venue	Attendance
December 16, 2017	Seoul	South Korea	Blue Square iMarket Hall	6,500
December 17, 2017	Seoul	South Korea	Blue Square iMarket Hall	6,500
December 31, 2017	Busan	South Korea	Sohyang Theatre Shinhan Card Hall	6,500
February 3, 2018	Hong Kong		KITEC (Rotunda 3)	1,500
Total				8,000

==== BOL4 3rd Solo Concert "Travel" (2018) ====
Date	City	Country	Venue	Attendance
2018 BOL4 2nd Concert in Taipei "Travel Together"
June 30, 2018	Taipei	Taiwan	Taipei International Convention Center	3,000
2018 BOL4 3rd Solo Concert "Travel"
July 14, 2018	Seoul	South Korea	Olympic Hall	6,000
July 15, 2018	Seoul	South Korea	Olympic Hall	6,000
2018 BOL4 (赤頬思春期) 1st Concert in Japan -旅-
August 8, 2018 (2 parts)	Tokyo	Japan	Toyosu PIT	2,500
Total				11,500

==== 2019 BOL4 Asia Tour "Blossom" ====
Date	City	Country	Venue
2019 BOL4 Spring Solo Concert "Flower Energy"
May 4, 2019	Seoul	South Korea	Blue Square iMarket Hall
May 5, 2019	Seoul	South Korea	Blue Square iMarket Hall
2019 BOL4 (赤頬思春期) Japan Premium Showcase
June 6, 2019	Osaka	Japan	Banana Hall
June 8, 2019	Tokyo	Japan	TSUTAYA O-East
2019 BOL4 Asia Tour "Blossom"
June 15, 2019	Hong Kong		KITEC (Star Hall)
July 13, 2019	Bangkok	Thailand	Moonstar Studio 8
November 9, 2019	Taipei	Taiwan	National Taiwan University Sports Center 1

==== 2019 BOL4 Tour Concert "Two Five" ====
Date	City	Country	Venue
November 30, 2019	Busan	South Korea	Sohyang Theatre Shinhan Card Hall
December 1, 2019	Busan	South Korea	Sohyang Theatre Shinhan Card Hall
December 7, 2019	Daegu	South Korea	EXCO (Auditorium)
December 8, 2019	Daegu	South Korea	EXCO (Auditorium)
December 14, 2019	Daejeon	South Korea	Woosong University (Art Hall)
December 15, 2019	Daejeon	South Korea	Woosong University (Art Hall)
December 21, 2019	Gwangju	South Korea	Chosun University (Sunup Hall Auditorium)
December 22, 2019	Gwangju	South Korea	Chosun University (Sunup Hall Auditorium)
December 28, 2019	Seoul	South Korea	Ewha Womans University (Grand Hall)
December 29, 2019	Seoul	South Korea	Ewha Womans University (Grand Hall)

==== BOL4 (赤頬思春期) Live Tour 2020 "Love" ====
Date	City	Country	Venue
January 16, 2020	Osaka	Japan	Zepp Namba
January 18, 2020	Tokyo	Japan	Toyosu PIT

==== BOL4 Concert "Seoul" (2022) ====
Date	City	Country	Venue
May 14, 2022	Seoul	South Korea	Olympic Hall
May 15, 2022	Seoul	South Korea	Olympic Hall

==== 2023 BOL4 Asia Tour "Love.zip" ====
Date	City	Country	Venue
2023 BOL4 Concert in Taipei
April 15, 2023	Taipei	Taiwan	TICC
BOL4 Concert "Love.zip"
April 29, 2023	Seoul	South Korea	Olympic Hall
April 30, 2023	Seoul	South Korea	Olympic Hall
2023 BOL4 Asia Tour "Love.zip"
August 19, 2023	Macau		Broadway Theatre
August 31, 2023	Tokyo	Japan	Tachikawa Stage Garden
September 9, 2023	Jakarta	Indonesia	Balai Sarbini
September 10, 2023	Singapore		The Theatre at Mediacorp
September 30, 2023	Taipei	Taiwan	TICC

=== Showcase ===
- BOL4 (赤頬思春期) 1st Live Showcase 宇宙をあげる～ (2018)

== Videography ==
=== Music videos ===
Year	Title	Album	Director
2016	"Fight Day" (싸운날)	Red Ickle	Zanybros
2016	"Galaxy" (우주를 줄게)	Red Planet	BTS Film
2016	"Hard to Love" (나만 안되는 연애)	Red Planet	Zanybros
2016	"Tell Me You Love Me" (좋다고 말해)	Non-album singles	VFAR
2017	"We Loved" (남이 될 수 있을까) with 20 Years of Age	Non-album singles	BTS Film
2017	"Blue"	Red Diary Page.1	Aloha Man
2017	"Imagine" (상상)	Red Diary Page.1	Aloha Man
2017	"Some" (썸 탈꺼야)	Red Diary Page.1	Mustache Film
2017	"Fix Me" (고쳐주세요)	Red Diary Page.1	Unknown
2018	"Travel" (여행)	Red Diary Page.2	Zanybros
2018	"Starlight (야경)	Red Diary Page.2	Zanybros
2018	"Wind" (바람사람)	Red Diary Page.2	Zanybros
2019	"Bom" (나만, 봄)	Puberty Book I Bom	Unknown
2019	"Stars Over Me" (별 보러 갈래?)	Puberty Book I Bom	Kyle
2019	"Galaxy" (宇宙をあげる)	Red Planet (Japan Edition)	Unknown
2019	"To My Youth" (私の思春期へ)	Non-album single	SEP,inc.
2019	"Workaholic" (워커홀릭)	Two Five	Zanybros
2019	"25"	Two Five	Zanybros
2020	"Love"	Non-album single	Zanybros
2020	"Leo" feat. Baekhyun (나비와 고양이)	Puberty Book II Pum	Unknown
2020	"Hug" (품)	Puberty Book II Pum	Unknown
2020	"Red Lipstick" (빨간 립스틱)	Filmlet	Unknown
2020	"Dancing Cartoon"	Filmlet	Zanybros
2021	"Butterfly Effect" (나비효과)	Butterfly Effect	Unknown
2021	"Space" (너는 내 세상이었어)	Butterfly Effect	Unknown
2022	"Seoul"	Seoul	Unknown
2023	"Friend the End"	Love.zip	Unknown
2023	"Snowball" (스노우볼)	Merry Go Round	Unknown
2023	"Eternal love" (사랑할 수밖에)	Merry Go Round	Unknown
2024	"Lips" (featuring Giselle)	Non-album singles	Unknown
2024	"Bloom"	Non-album singles	Novv Kim (Novv)
2026	"Golden Hour" (황금기)	October Archive	Jang Hoyoung

== Filmography ==
=== Television shows ===
Year	Title	Network	Role	Notes/ Ref.
2014	Superstar K 6	Mnet	Contestant	
2017	My Little Television	MBC	Cast	On Episode 84 & 85
