= Bursters =

South Korean rock band

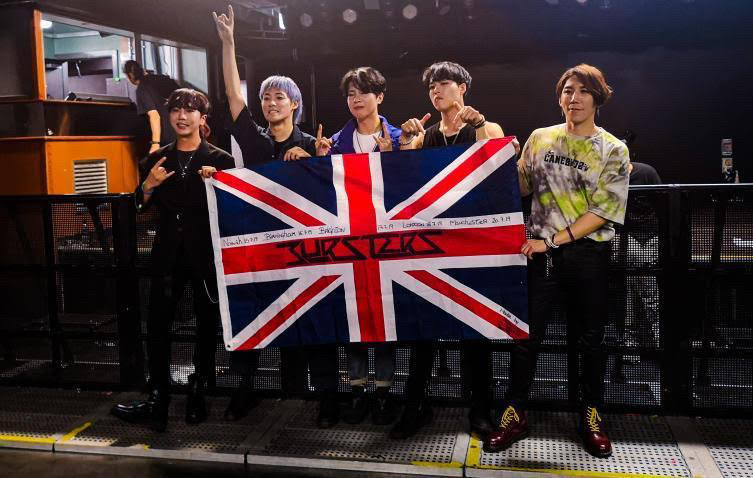
- Musicians of Bursters in Manchester, UK, 2019.

Background information
- Also known as: Burstered
- Origin: Seoul, South Korea
- Genres: Metalcore; heavy metal; post-hardcore; hard rock
- Years active: 2014–present
- Labels: Evermore Music
- Members: Daegun Noh; Junyong Ahn; Gyejin Lee; Hwanhee Jo; Taehee Jo
- Past members: Sangyun Jung
- Website: evermoremusic.co

Bursters (Korean: 버스터즈, formerly known as Burstered (버스터리드) is a South Korean metalcore band under Evermore Music. The group first appeared on Superstar K6, in which the band finished at Top 6 as the first-ever heavy rock band in Superstar K history to do so. They released their debut album, Live In Hope, on April 16, 2017, which received a high score of 85/100 on Japan's renowned hard rock and metal magazine Burrn!. The band is also the first Korean artist to have been included in the weekly radio playlist of Kerrang! with the single "Barriers".

The first single, "Colors", off of their second album, Once and For All, was released on February 19, 2020.

== Members ==
- Dae-gun Noh (노대건) – Vocalist
- Jun-yong Ahn (안준용) – Guitarist
- Gye-jin Lee (이계진) – Guitarist
- Hwan-hee Jo (조환희) – Bassist
- Tae-hee Jo (조태희) – Drummer

== Past members ==
- Jeong Sangyun (정상윤) – Drummer

== Discography ==
=== Studio albums ===
Title	Album details	Peak chart positions	Sales
Title	Album details	KOR	Sales
Live In Hope	Released: April 16, 2017; Label: Evermore Music, LOEN Entertainment; Formats: CD, digital download	81	—N/a
Once And For All	Released: March 31, 2020; Label: Evermore Music, Kakao M; Formats: CD, digital download	60	—N/a

=== Extended plays ===
Title	Album details	Peak chart positions	Sales
Title	Album details	KOR	Sales
Independent	Released: February 17, 2015; Label: Evermore Music, LOEN Entertainment; Formats: CD, digital download	11	KOR: 341

=== Single albums ===
Title	Album details	Peak chart positions	Sales
Title	Album details	KOR	Sales
Lost Child	Released: September 25, 2015; Label: Evermore Music, LOEN Entertainment; Formats: CD, digital download	—	—N/a

=== Singles ===
Title	Year	Peak chart positions	Sales (DL)	Album
Title	Year	KOR	Sales (DL)	Album
"Whenever You Call Me" (나를 부르면)	2015	—	—N/a	Independent
"Gwangalli" (광안리에서)	2015	—	—N/a	Lost Child
"Wherever You Are"	2017	—	—N/a	Live In Hope
"—" denotes releases that did not chart.
