= Walking With (album) =

Studio album by Kim Dong-ryool
- Released: October 1, 2014
- Recorded: 2014
- Genre: K-pop, ballad
- Length: 43:58
- Language: Korean
- Label: Music Farm, LOEN Entertainment
- Producer: Kim Dong-ryool

Kim Dong-ryool chronology
KimdongrYULE (2011)	Walking With (2014)

Singles from Walking With
- 1. "How I Am" Released: October 1, 2014

Walking With (Korean: 동행; RR: Donghaeng) is the sixth solo studio album by South Korean pop singer-songwriter Kim Dong-ryool, and his seventh solo album overall. It was released on October 1, 2014 by the artist's label Music Farm and distributed by LOEN Entertainment. Guitarist Lee Sang-soon (who has also been known as Lee Hyori's husband) and Superstar K2 runner-up John Park participated on the album as featured artists. The album is the singer's first solo release since the holiday album KimdongrYULE (2011), and also his first studio album since Monologue (2008).

The self-produced album features ten tracks in total, including the lead single "How I Am" and the track under the same title. Without any televised promotions, "How I Am" topped the Gaon Singles Chart for two consecutive weeks. The song also won Song of the Year at the 4th annual Gaon Chart K-Pop Awards.

An LP edition of the album, limited to 3,000 copies, was available for sale. As of March 2025, Walking With has sold over 58,000 physical albums and three million digital singles in South Korea (see Chart performance).

== Singles ==
=== "How I Am" ===
"How I Am" (Korean: 그게 나야; RR: Geuge Naya) is the lead single from the album. The song depicts a man who misses his past lover, and actor Gong Yoo starred in its corresponding music video. After filming the music video, Gong stated "I can't forget the memories when I listened to the music of Exhibition (Korean: 전람회; RR: Jeollamhoe) using cassette tapes in my school years. Kim has been my favorite musician since then. I wanted to celebrate by starring in the music video, in my mind to cheer the 20th anniversary of his debut." The music video was released on October 1, 2014, via LOEN Entertainment's official YouTube channel.

Upon its release, "How I Am" achieved an "all-kill" status in South Korea, reaching the pole position on all of the real-time music charts including MelOn, Bugs, Soribada, Genie, Mnet Music, Monkey3, Olleh Music, Cyworld Music, Daum Music, and Naver Music. Without any broadcast promotions, the song topped the Gaon Singles Chart for two consecutive weeks. It also won the first place on televised K-pop music shows like The Music Trend (SBS) and Music Bank (KBS), from October 12 to 17, 2014. This was Kim's first feat since he received a trophy for "Should I Tell You Again That I Love You?" (Korean: 다시 사랑한다 말할까; RR: Dasi Saranghanda Malhalkka) on MBC's Music Camp (currently Show! Music Core) in January 2002.

"How I Am" was the 51st biggest selling digital song of 2014 in South Korea. Since its release, the song has sold about 900,000 digital copies domestically.

== Promotion ==
Instead of having broadcast promotions, it was announced that Kim would hold his nationwide concert tour from November 1, 2014. Starting in Busan, he performed in cities including Seongnam, Gwangju, Goyang, Jeonju, Seoul, Daegu, and Daejeon until January 3, 2015, to promote his comeback album.

== Track listing ==
All songs written and composed by Kim Dong-ryool.

CD/Digital download
No.	Title	Length
1.	"Confession" (고백; Gobaek)	4:25
2.	"Those Days" (청춘; Cheongchoon, featuring Lee Sang-soon)	4:25
3.	"My Very Own" (내 사람; Nae Saram)	4:28
4.	"Advice" (featuring John Park)	3:32
5.	"How I Am" (그게 나야; Geuge Naya)	4:44
6.	"Puzzle" (퍼즐; Peojeul)	4:28
7.	"Where My Heart Is" (내 마음은; Nae Maeumeun)	4:39
8.	"Today" (오늘; Oneul)	3:30
9.	"That Song" (그 노래; Geu Norae)	5:22
10.	"Walking With" (동행; Donghaeng)	4:25
Total length:		43:58

Notes

- The title of track 2 literally means "The Youth".
- The title of track 5 literally means "That's How I Am".
- The title of track 7 literally means "My Heart Is".

== Chart performance ==
=== Album charts ===
Chart (2014)	Peak position	Sales
South Korean Gaon Weekly Albums Chart	2	KOR: 58,300+ (Note: Sales for both CD and LP editions are combined.)
South Korean Gaon Monthly Albums Chart	5	KOR: 58,300+
South Korean Gaon Year-End Albums Chart	40	KOR: 58,300+
US Billboard World Albums Chart	3	KOR: 58,300+

=== Single charts ===
How I Am

Chart (2014)	Peak position	Sales
South Korean Gaon Weekly Singles Chart	1	KOR: 900,000+ (digital downloads only)
South Korean Gaon Monthly Singles Chart	1	KOR: 900,000+ (digital downloads only)
South Korean Gaon Year-End Singles Chart	46	KOR: 900,000+ (digital downloads only)

=== Other charted songs ===
Title	Peak chart position	Sales
Title	KOR Gaon	Sales
"My Very Own"	5	KOR: 402,000+ (digital downloads only)
"Confession"	6	KOR: 279,000+ (digital downloads only)
"Those Days"	9	KOR: 269,000+ (digital downloads only)
"Walking With"	11	KOR: 270,000+ (digital downloads only)
"Advice"	12	KOR: 221,000+ (digital downloads only)
"Where My Heart Is"	13	KOR: 210,000+ (digital downloads only)
"Puzzle"	15	KOR: 185,000+ (digital downloads only)
"That Song"	16	KOR: 185,000+ (digital downloads only)
"Today"	19	KOR: 172,000+ (digital downloads only)

== Awards and nominations ==
=== Annual music awards ===
Year	Award	Category	Recipient	Result
2014	16th Mnet Asian Music Awards	Best Vocal Performance – Male	"How I Am"	Nominated
2015	24th Seoul Music Awards	Bonsang (Main Prize)	Kim Dong-ryool	Nominated
2015	24th Seoul Music Awards	High1/Mobile Popularity Award	Kim Dong-ryool	Nominated
2015	24th Seoul Music Awards	Hallyu Special Award	Kim Dong-ryool	Nominated
2015	4th Gaon Chart K-Pop Awards	Song of the Year – October 2014	"How I Am"	Won

=== Music program awards ===
Song	Program	Date
"How I Am"	The Music Trend (SBS)	October 12, 2014
"How I Am"	Music Bank (KBS)	October 17, 2014

== Release history ==
Region	Date	Format	Edition	Label
South Korea	October 1, 2014	CD, digital download		Music Farm, LOEN Entertainment
Worldwide	October 1, 2014	Digital download		Music Farm, LOEN Entertainment
South Korea	January 15, 2015	LP	Limited Edition	Music Farm, LOEN Entertainment

== See also ==
- List of number-one hits of 2014 (South Korea)
