= Kim Dong-ryul =

South Korean singer-songwriter

- Born: March 15, 1974 (age 51); Seoul, South Korea
- Genres: Pop, jazz, ballad
- Occupation(s): Singer-songwriter, record producer, TV presenter, radio DJ
- Instrument(s): Vocal, piano
- Years active: 1993–present
- Labels: Music Farm (2007–present); Woollim Entertainment (2004); Daeyoung AV (1993–2004)
- Website: www.kimdongryul.com

- Kim Dong-ryul
- Hangul: 김동률
- Hanja: 金東律
- RR: Gim Dongryul
- MR: Kim Tongnyul

Kim Dong-ryul (Korean: 김동률; born March 15, 1974) is a South Korean singer-songwriter. He composes, arranges, writes lyrics, produces, and performs his own music. He has been active since 1993.

== Career ==
=== Exhibition era (1993–1997) ===
As an architectural major in Yonsei University, Kim Dong-ryul formed the duet Exhibition with his close friend, Seo Dong-wook. Dong-ryul composed their songs and played the piano while Dong-wook played bass guitar.

The duet became famous through an MBC University Song Festival in 1993. They emerged champion and won the special prize with the song "In Dreams" which Seo wrote and Kim composed. From then onwards, Kim began his career of singing, composing, and writing lyrics.

Exhibition's self-titled first album, which famous singer Shin Hae-cheol produced and featured on, was released in May 1994. Even though the duet were new figures in the world of popular music, they did the composing, piano, bass, and computer programming themselves. The album received positive reviews and climbed onto the top ten chart, going on to sell over 600,000 copies.

In 1994, Kim and Seo enlisted in military service together. Upon release, the duet released their second album Strangers in 1996. The album was also produced by Shin Hae-cheol, and instrumentalists Yi Byeong-woo, Kim Se-hwang, and Jeong Won-young participated in it. Strangers also received positive reviews from critics, but there was a plagiarism dispute regarding "A Testament", a song on the album. The song came under suspicion because of its similarity to "The Girl Who Fell from the Sky", from the soundtrack in Studio Ghibli's animated film Laputa: Castle in the Sky. Experts decided that the main melody and ways of using instruments were similar, so "A Testament" became a dishonourable song for the duet.

In 1997, the duet decided to return to normal school life. They then released their last album Graduation with five songs which had special personal meanings for them. Especially, "First Love" which was composed by Kim Dong-ryul when he was 14 years old and "In Dreams" which was the song that made the duet very popular.

=== Carnival era ===
After disbanding, Seo Dong-wook became a normal student. But Kim Dong-ryul said, "The only thing I can do is music." He created the project group Carnival with Lee Juck, with whom he became close with through the Jam concert of a popular radio program, At Starry Nights. Both of them were 24, singers and composers. But their music styles were very different. Kim Dong-ryul's songs were still slightly naive and mostly standard classical ballads, while Lee Juck's songs were poignant and heretical.

The two decided to collaborate and their music was of the funk genre. They worked with world-famous brass session team, Jerry Hey, and Korean singer and jazz pianist, Kim Gwang-min; subsequently they released the album Carnival in 1997. It had a retro theme, and was a great success for them. They won the Golden Disc Award.

=== Solo era ===
After the success of Carnival, Kim composed several popular songs such as "For a Thousand Days" for Lee Seung-hwan and "Show" for Kim Won-jun. In 1998, he released his first solo album The Shadow of Forgetfulness with a piano-based sound recalling early Elton John. Critics wrote that he had managed to create a new ballad style which featured classical and polished melodies. After the first album, he held his first solo concert on Christmas Day in 1998.

Even though he was already successful and a well-acknowledged artiste, Kim decided to study music more. He entered Berklee College of Music in 1999 and majored in film scoring. While studying there, he wanted to make real Korean-style music and he became more interested in Korean traditional music and culture.

At the end of his first academic year, he released his second solo album Hope. In this album, he collaborated with not only the London Symphony Orchestra but also 'Samulnori' which is a traditional Korean percussion quartet. In 2001, he released his third solo album Homecoming. He continued to integrate Korean traditional music and classical sound. The critics commented on this album that it had a well-rounded sound and the overall atmosphere was natural and stable.

After graduating top of his class, Kim returned to Korea and released his fourth solo album Exposing in 2004. The song "At Long Last" (이제서야) from this album topped the KBS charts in April. Kim had tried to incorporate some new music styles in Exposing, such as bossa nova, samba, and pop-opera. His music became more comprehensive and mature. Especially, song arrangements were more refined than before.

Kim Dong-ryul held his second solo concert in Seoul and Busan in August 2004 and released the live recording album Invitation in 2005. He put his music and experience of the past ten years into this recording album. From 2005 to 2007, he hosted the TV music program Kim Dong-ryul's For You and the radio program Kim Dong-ryul's Music Island. A 'Best-Of' compilation album was released in 2007.

In 2008, Kim released his fifth album Monologue. It peaked at number one on the charts and sold nearly 100,000 copies. This record was momentous to the Korean music industry because the rate of physical album sales then had been very low. Most songs from the album became very popular among all generations.

After this breakthrough, Kim held three concerts in 2008. All the advance tickets were sold out in less than 20 minutes. The concerts were designed to be full-scale in every way and Kim rearranged his songs to be accompanied by an orchestra.

In January 2018, Kim released an EP, Reply, after a three-year hiatus which sold 14,374 copies in the first month of sales. In September of that year, he released a single titled "Song", which is an extension of his latest EP Reply.

== Solo discography ==
=== Studio albums ===
Title	Album details	Peak chart positions			Sales
Title	Album details	KOR (MIAK)	KOR (Circle)	US World	Sales
Shadow of Forgetfulness	Released: September 22, 1998; Label: Daeyoung A/V; Formats: CD, cassette	5	—	—	KOR: 203,657
Hope (희망)	Released: August 16, 2000; Label: Daeyoung A/V; Formats: CD, cassette	4	—	—	KOR: 190,758
Homecoming (귀향)	Released: October 26, 2001; Label: Daeyoung A/V; Formats: CD, cassette	10	—	—	KOR: 267,828
Outpouring (토로)	Released: March 9, 2004; Label: EMI; Formats: CD, cassette	2	22	—	KOR: 129,261
Monologue	Released: January 25, 2008; Label: Music Farm; Formats: CD, LP	1	34	—	KOR: 112,662
Walking With (동행)	Released: October 1, 2014; Label: Music Farm; Formats: CD, LP, digital download	*	2	3	KOR: 57,435
An asterisk (*) denotes a defunct chart.

=== Live albums ===
Title	Album details	Peak chart positions		Sales
Title	Album details	KOR (MIAK)	KOR (Circle)	Sales
2004 The Second Concert "Invitation"	Released: February 18, 2005; Label: EMI; Formats: CD	16	—	KOR: 12,509
2008 Concert "Monologue"	Released: May 18, 2009; Label: Music Farm; Formats: CD	*	77	
Live 2012 "Gratitude" / 2014 "Walking With"	Released: August 6, 2015; Label: Music Farm; Formats: CD, digital download	*	6	KOR: 7,728
Live 2019 An Old Song (오래된 노래)	Released: September 30, 2020; Label: Music Farm; Formats: CD, LP, digital download	*	18	
An asterisk (*) denotes a defunct chart.

=== Extended plays ===
Title	Album details	Peak chart positions		Sales
Title	Album details	KOR (Circle)	US World	Sales
KimdongrYULE	Released: November 15, 2011; Label: Music Farm; Formats: CD, LP, digital download	1	—	KOR: 27,724
Reply (답장)	Released: January 11, 2018; Label: Music Farm; Formats: CD, LP, digital download	6	7	KOR: 14,374

=== Singles ===
Title	Year	Peak chart positions	Album
Title	Year	KOR	Album
"Consideration" (배려)	1998	—	Shadow of Forgetfulness
"Wall" (벽) (feat. Yangpa)	2000	—	Hope
"Shall I Love You Again?" (다시 사랑한다 말할까)	2001	—	Homecoming
"At Long Last" (이제서야)	2004	—	Outpouring
"Thanks" (감사)	2007	—	Thanks
"Let's Start Again" (다시 시작해보자)	2008	—	Monologue
"Departure" (출발)	2008	30	Monologue
"Replay"	2011	10	KimdongrYULE
"How I Am" (그게나야)	2014	1	Walking With
"Reply" (답장)	2018	3	Reply
"That's The Way It Is" (그럴 수밖에)	2018	64	Non-album singles
"Song" (노래)	2018	65	Non-album singles
"Fairy Tale" (동화) (feat. IU)	2018	4	Non-album singles
"Brink of Summer" (여름의 끝자락) (feat. Kim Jeong-won)	2019	— (Note: "Brink of Summer" did not enter the Circle Digital Chart, but it peaked at number 45 on the component Download Chart.)	Non-album singles
"Golden Mask" (황금가면)	2023	— (Note: "Golden Mask" did not enter the Circle Digital Chart, but it peaked at number 41 on the component Download Chart.)	Non-album singles
"After All This Time" (옛 얘기지만)	2023	190	Non-album singles
"Stroll" (산책)	2024	93	Non-album singles

== Band discography ==
=== Exhibition ===
- Exhibition (1994)
- Exhibition 2 (1996)
- Graduation (졸업) (1997)

=== Carnival ===
- Carnival (1997)

=== Verandah Project ===
- Day Off (2010)

== Awards and nominations ==
Award	Year	Category	Nominated work	Result	Ref.
Cyworld Digital Music Awards	2008	Song of the Month – April	"Like a Child" (아이처럼)	Won	
Gaon Chart Music Awards	2015	Song of the Year – October	"How I Am" (그게나야)	Won	
Golden Disc Awards	2008	Album Bonsang	Monologue	Won	
Golden Disc Awards	2008	Album of the Year	Monologue	Nominated	
Golden Disc Awards	2008	Digital Song Bonsang	"Like a Child"	Nominated	
Golden Disc Awards	2008	Popularity Award	Kim Dong-ryul	Nominated	
Golden Disc Awards	2015	Digital Song Bonsang	"How I Am"	Nominated	
Korean Music Awards	2005	Best Pop Album	Outpouring	Nominated	
Korean Music Awards	2009	Best Pop Album	Monologue	Won	
Korean Music Awards	2009	Album of the Year	Monologue	Nominated	
Korean Music Awards	2009	Musician of the Year	Kim Dong-ryul	Nominated	
Korean Music Awards	2009	Best Pop Song	"Departure" (출발)	Nominated	
MAMA Awards	2008	Lyricist Award	"Let's Start Again" (다시 시작해보자)	Won	
MAMA Awards	2008	Best Male Artist	"Let's Start Again" (다시 시작해보자)	Nominated	
MAMA Awards	2008	Best Ballad/R&B Performance	"Let's Start Again" (다시 시작해보자)	Nominated	
MAMA Awards	2008	Album of the Year	Monologue	Nominated	
MAMA Awards	2014	Best Vocal Performance – Male	"How I Am"	Nominated	
