= Superstar K 6 =

Season of television series

- Season 6
- Hosted by: Kim Sung-joo
- Judges: Lee Seung-chul; Yoon Jong-shin; Kim Bum-soo; Baek Ji-young; Ailee
- Winner: Kwak Jin-eon
- Runner-up: Kim Feel
- Finals venue: Kyung Hee University Grand Peace Hall

Release
- Original network: Mnet; KM; tvN; Mnet America
- Original release: August 22 – November 21, 2014

Season chronology
- ← Previous; Superstar K 5 Next → Superstar K 7

Superstar K 6 (Korean: 슈퍼스타 K6) is the sixth season of the South Korean television talent show series Superstar K, which premiered on 22 August 2014 on Mnet and aired Friday nights at 11PM KST. Eliminations were determined in each episode based on text message votes and online votes open to the public. The winner of Superstar K 6, Kwak Jin-eon, received 500,000,000 won (US$470,990) worth of prizes and benefits; 300,000,000 won (US$282,486) in cash prizes and 200,000,000 won (US$188,324) for record producing. Lee Seung-chul and Yoon Jong-shin returned as judges. The season also saw the addition of Kim Bum-soo and Baek Ji-young as judges following the departure of Lee Ha-neul of DJ DOC.

== Finalists ==
Kwak Jin-eon (곽진언, born October 23, 1991) is from Seoul, South Korea.

Kim Feel (김필, born August 27, 1986) is from Seoul, South Korea.

Burstered (버스터리드) is a five-member rock band from Seoul, South Korea. The group consists of No Dae-gun (노대건, 26), Jung Sang-yun (정상윤, 20), An Jun-yong (안준용, 26), Lee Gye-jin (이계진, 26), Cho Hwan-hee (조환희, 26).

Brian Park (브라이언 박, born June 9, 1993) is from Seoul, South Korea.

Song Yu-vin (송유빈, born April 28, 1998) is from Daegu, South Korea. In 2016 he debuted in South Korean music group "Myteen" under The Music Works.

Foxstar (여우별밴드) is a four-member teen female band from Hampyeong, South Jeolla Province, South Korea. The group consists of Baek Chae Lin (백채린, 19), Baek Yu Lin (백유린, 18), Kim Da Seul (김다슬, 18), Lee Seul (이슬, 18).

Lee Jun-hee (이준희, born January 7, 2000) is from Gunsan, South Korea.

Lee Hae-na (이해나, born June 2, 1991) is from Seoul, South Korea. A solo singer; she was also once a part of a girl group called Kiss & Cry (band) (키스&크라이) where she served as the main vocalist.

Lim Do-hyeok (임도혁, born October 10, 1992) is from Gyeonggi Province, South Korea.

Jang Woo-ram (장우람, born February 17, 1986) is a formal vocal trainer for previous seasons of Superstar K from Seoul, South Korea.

MICA (미카) (4th Power/4th Impact) is a female vocalist group, made up of four sisters from Manila, Philippines. The group consists of: Mylene (마이린, 23), Irene (아이린, 25), Celina (셀리나, 20), Almira (알미라, 27). They are the only foreigner contestants in the season and the last girl standing from Top 8.

== Finals ==
Order	Contestant	Result
1st Live Show Eliminated	Foxstar	Top 11
1st Live Show Eliminated	Lee Hae-Na	Top 11
3rd	Brian Park	Top 9
4th	Lee Jun-Hee	Top 8
4th	MICA (now 4th Impact)	Top 8
5th	Burstered	Top 6
6th	Jang Woo-Ram	Top 5
6th	Song Yu-Bin	Top 5
7th	Lim Do-Hyeok	Top 3
Finale	Kim Feel	Runner-Up
Finale	Kwak Jin-eon	Superstar K6 Grand Winner
