= Kim Feel =

South Korean singer-songwriter (born 1986)

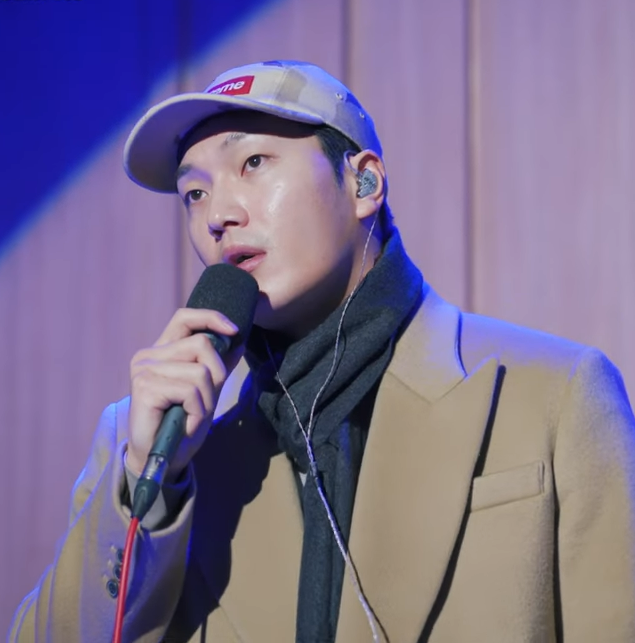
- Kim Feel

Background information
- Born: August 27, 1986 (age 40)
- Origin: South Korea
- Genres: K-pop; R&B
- Occupation: Singer-songwriter
- Instrument: Guitar
- Years active: 2011–present
- Labels: CJ E&M; Archive Morning

Korean name
- Hangul: 김필
- RR: Gim Pil
- MR: Kim P'il

Kim Feel (Korean: 김필; born August 27, 1986) is a South Korean singer-songwriter. He was the runner-up of the television talent show Superstar K 6 in 2014.

Kim signed contract with CJ E&M in May 2016 and managed under CJ E&M label MMO Entertainment. In September 2020, Kim left CJ E&M and signed with new established label Archive Morning.

== Philanthropy ==
On March 10, 2022, Kim made a donation of ₩10 million to the Hope Bridge Disaster Relief Association to help the victims of the massive wildfire that spread from Uljin, Gyeongbuk to Samcheok, Gangwon.

== Discography ==
=== Extended plays ===
Title	EP details	Peak chart positions	Sales
Title	EP details	KOR	Sales
Feel Free	Released: June 11, 2015; Label: CJ E&M; Format: CD, digital download; Track listing: 1. 필요해 (True Love); 2. Stay with Me; 3. Lose Control; 4. Fly to Your Dream; 5. 눈에 적시는 말 (Nothing Without You); 6. Pierrot (광대)	9	KOR: 2,506
from Feel	Released: December 6, 2016; Label: CJ E&M; Format: CD, digital download; Track listing: 1. 사랑 하나 (Love 1); 2. 성북동 (Seongbukdong); 3. Tell me 4. 괴수 (Monster) (feat. Echae Kang, Koh Sangji); 5. I Feel You	16	KOR: 2,416
Yours, Sincerely	Released: December 13, 2019; Label: Stone Music, MMO; Format: CD, digital download, streaming	27	KOR: 1,766

=== Singles ===
Title	Year	Peak chart positions	Album
Title	Year	KOR	Album
"Crying Again Like a Fool" (바보 같이 또 울어요) (feat. Minos)	2011	—	Non-album singles
"I Said I Love You" (사랑한다면서)	2012	—	Non-album singles
"Beautiful"	2013	—	Non-album singles
"Sugar Sugar" (슈가슈가) (feat. Minos)	2013	—	Non-album singles
"Bye December"	2014	—	Non-album singles
"Make U Mine"	2014	—	Non-album singles
"Cry"	2014	—	Non-album singles
"New Day" (처음으로) (with Shin Jisoo)	2014	59	Non-album singles
"Exhausted" (지친 하루) (with Yoon Jong-shin, Kwak Jin-eon)	2014	13	Monthly Project 2014 Yoon Jong Shin
"Whatever" (뭐라고) (with Kwak Jin-eon)	2015	—	Non-album singles
"Marry Me"	2015	37	Non-album singles
"Stay With Me"	2015	—	Feel Free
"Monster" (괴수) (feat. Echae Kang, Koh Sangji)	2016	—	from Feel
"Seongbukdong" (성북동)	2016	48	from Feel
"Your Voice" (목소리)	2019	97	Yours, Sincerely
"Love2" (사랑 둘)	2019	95	Yours, Sincerely
"Unstable" (이별하긴 하겠지) (with Yoon Jong-shin, Cheon Dan-bi)	2019	193	Monthly Project 2019 Yoon Jong Shin
"Sleeplessness" (불면)	2020	191	Non-album singles
"Someday" (어떤 날은)	2021	126	Non-album singles
"Like the First Moment I Met You" (처음 만난 그때처럼)	2021	200	Non-album singles
"Push & Pull" (시작)	2022	—	Non-album singles
"Spring Night" (봄밤)	2022	—	Non-album singles
"—" denotes release did not chart.

=== Soundtrack appearances ===
Title	Year	Peak chart positions	Certifications	Album
Title	Year	KOR	Certifications	Album
"Cheer Up Geumsoon" (굳세어라 금순아) (with Kwak Jin-eon)	2014	—		Ode to My Father OST
"Ghost in Your Mind" (멀어진다)	2015	95		Punch OST
"I'll Never Forget You" (막핀꽃처럼)	2015	—		Salut d'Amour OST
"Youth" (청춘) (feat. Kim Chang-wan)	2015	4		Reply 1988 OST
"If I Live Again" (다시 산다면)	2016	66		Memory OST
"Walk to the Sky" (하늘을 걸어)	2016	—		My Lawyer, Mr. Jo OST
"Tomorrow, With You" (내일 그대와)	2017	68		Tomorrow, With You OST
"Fallin'"	2019	—		Abyss OST
"When Winter Comes" (겨울이 오면)	2019	100		When the Camellia Blooms OST
"Someday, the Boy" (그때 그 아인)	2020	3	KMCA: Platinum (Note: Certification for streaming)	Itaewon Class OST
"Hallelujah" (나도 모르는 노래)	2020	80		It's Okay to Not Be Okay OST
"One Day" (어느 날 우리)	2020	—		Start-Up OST
"Destiny"	2021	—		Jirisan OST
"Here We Are"	2022	—		My Liberation Notes OST
"I Can't Forget You" (난, 너를)	2022	141		If You Wish Upon Me OST
"My Star" (나의 별이 돼주오)	2023	156		My Dearest OST
"All Our Days" (우리 모든 날들)	2024	—		Family by Choice OST
"—" denotes release did not chart.

=== Other charted songs ===
Title	Year	Peak chart positions	Album
Title	Year	KOR	Album
"Only You" (당신만이) (with Kwak Jin-eon, Lim Do-hyuk)	2014	1	Superstar K 6: Kwak Jin-eon & Kim Feel & Im Do-hyunk
"Don't Worry Dear" (걱정말아요 그대) (with Kwak Jin-eon)	2014	7	Superstar K 6: Kwak Jin-eon vs. Kim Feel
"Ice Fortress" (얼음요새)	2014	21	Superstar K 6 Top 11
"Waiting" (기다림)	2014	86	Superstar K 6 Top 11
"The Wind Blows" (바람이 분다)	2014	38	Superstar K 6 Top 11

== Filmography ==
=== Television show ===
Year	Title	Role	Notes	Ref.
2022	Star Birth	Star maker		
2023	Begin Again - Intermission	Cast Member	spin-off	
