= Kwak Jin-eon =

South Korean singer and songwriter (born 1991)

Kwak Jin-eon 곽진언
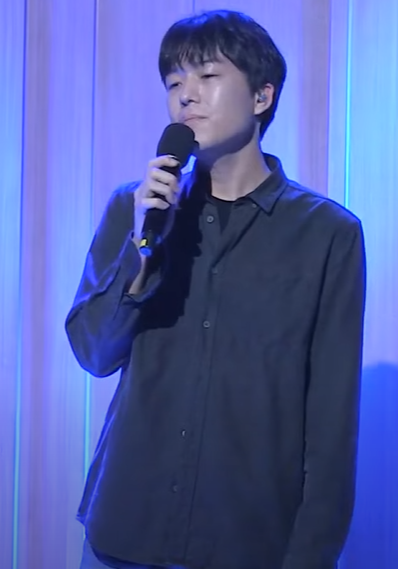

Background information
- Born: October 23, 1991 (age 34); South Korea
- Genres: K-pop; R&B; Soul; folk
- Occupations: Singer; songwriter
- Years active: 2014–present
- Labels: Music Farm

Kwak Jin-eon (Korean: 곽진언; born October 23, 1991) is a South Korean singer and songwriter. He was the winner of Superstar K6 in 2014. He released his first album, Go With Me on May 10, 2016.

== Discography ==
=== Studio album ===
Title	Album details	Peak chart positions	Sales
Title	Album details	KOR	Sales
Go With Me (나랑 갈래)	Released: May 10, 2016; Label: Music Farm; Formats: CD, digital download	10	KOR: 4,273

=== Extended plays ===
Title	Album details	Peak chart positions	Sales
Title	Album details	KOR	Sales
Jeongneung (정릉)	Released: April 6, 2022; Label: Music Farm; Formats: Digital download	—	
"—" denotes release did not chart

=== Singles ===
Title	Year	Peak chart positions	Album
Title	Year	KOR	Album
"Exhausted" (지친 하루) (with Yoon Jong-shin, Kim Feel)	2014	13	Monthly Project 2014 Yoon Jong Shin
"Whatever" (뭐라고) (with Kim Feel)	2015	—	Non-album single
"Go With Me" (나랑 갈래)	2016	34	Go With Me
"Remains" (고스란히)	2017	89	Non-album singles
"A Walk Together" (함께 걷는 길)	2018	—	Non-album singles
"Freely" (자유롭게)	2018	—	Non-album singles
"Your Shape" (너의 모습)	2019	—	Non-album singles
"Eye to Eye" (바라본다면)	2021	—	Non-album singles
"Yours" (그대의 것)	2022	—	Jeongneung
"—" denotes release did not chart

=== Soundtrack appearances ===
Title	Year	Peak chart positions	Album
Title	Year	KOR	Album
"Cheer" (응원)	2014	—	Misaeng: Incomplete Life OST
"Cheer Up Geumsoon!" (굳세어라 금순아) (with Kim Feel)	2014	—	Ode to My Father OST
"Walk With Me" (같이 걸을까)	2017	—	Circle OST
"My Self in My Heart" (내 마음에 비친 내 모습)	2018	—	My Mister OST
"Like a Winter's Dream" (겨울이 꾸는 꿈처럼)	2020	—	When the Weather Is Fine OST
"In Front of City Hall at the Subway Station" (시청 앞 지하철 역에서)	2020	55	Hospital Playlist OST
"Let Go" (놓아준다)	2020	—	He and She OST
"A Gloomy Letter" (우울한 편지)	2021	—	Taxi Driver OST
"My Spring Days" (나의 오월)	2021	—	Youth of May OST
"That Day" (그런 날)	2021	—	Monthly Magazine Home OST
"A Kind Of Confession" (일종의 고백)	2022	—	My Liberation Notes OST
"—" denotes release did not chart

=== Other charted songs ===
Title	Year	Peak chart positions	Album
Title	Year	KOR	Album
"Only You" (당신만이) (with Kim Feel, Lim Do-hyuk)	2014	1	Superstar K 6: Kwak Jin-eon & Kim Feel & Lim Do-hyuk
"Don't Worry Dear" (걱정말아요 그대) (with Kim Feel)	2014	7	Superstar K 6: Kwak Jin-eon vs. Kim Feel
"Sogyeokdong" (소격동) (original by Seo Taiji)	2014	27	Superstar K 6 Top 11 Part 3
"Boast" (자랑)	2014	21	Superstar K 6 Final: Kwak Jin-eon & Kim Feel

== Filmography ==
Year	Title	Role	Notes
2014	Superstar K 6	Contestant	Superstar K6 Grand Winner
2017	Immortal Song 2	Contestant	Ep. 295 (Sing "Reincarnation")

== Radio show ==
Year	Title	Network
2018	Today's Radio	KBS Cool FM
2018	Kiss the Radio	KBS Cool FM
