= Yoon Jong-shin =

South Korean singer and record producer

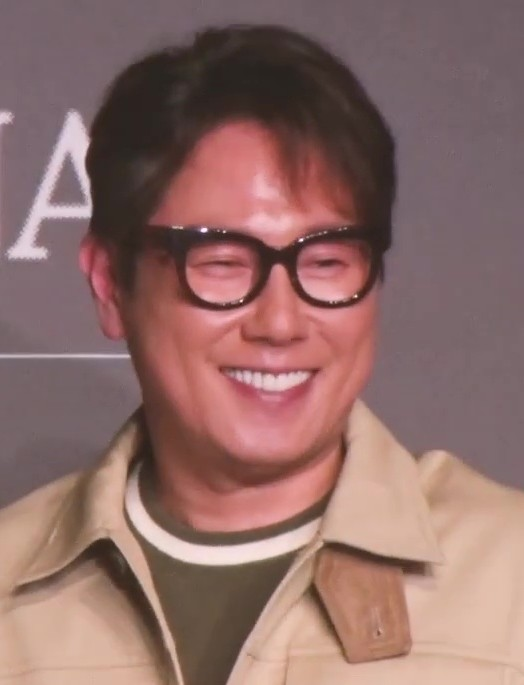
- Yoon in March 2019

Background information
- Born: October 15, 1969 (age 57); South Korea
- Genres: K-pop; ballad
- Occupations: Singer-songwriter; record producer; record executive
- Years active: 1990–present
- Label: Mystic Story
- Website: Official website

Korean name
- Hangul: 윤종신
- Hanja: 尹鍾信
- RR: Yun Jongsin
- MR: Yun Chongsin

Yoon Jong-shin (Korean: 윤종신; born October 15, 1969) is a South Korean singer-songwriter, record producer, and the CEO of Mystic Story.

== Early life and education ==
Yoon completed high school at Daewon Foreign Language High School and studied Korean Language and Literature at Yonsei University, graduating in 1993. He joined a music club called Sochangsa (소창사) where he nurtured his love for music.

== Career ==
In 1990, he made his debut as a guest singer for 015B.

In 1991, he announced his first album Like the first time we met (처음 만날 때처럼) as a solo singer which drew huge public interest. He has continuously collaborated with 015B since.

In 2000, he made his movie debut in Can hardly stop them with a cameo along with the director, Kim. He became active in the field of entertainment and, in 2003, took a role in a sitcom Nonstop 4 where he played a professor.

He owns a talent agency/record label called Mystic89, founded in 2001 with Lee Hak-hee.

In 2009, he became a regular cast member in Radio Star, the main segment of MBC's Golden Fishery, and in SBS's Family Outing. He has also been a judge for seasons 1–3 and 5–7 of Mnet's talent show Superstar K.

In February 2012, he made an appearance on SBS's Healing Camp, Aren't You Happy where he announced that he had Crohn's disease, an incurable inflammatory bowel disease. He became the co-host of SBS's GO Show in April 2012.

In February 2013, he became the co-host of SBS's Hwasin - Controller of the Heart.

From April 2013, he is the regular host of SBS reality show, Barefooted Friends.

In 2017, Red Velvet released a remake of his 1996 song "Rebirth" (환생) through SM Station.

In 2019, he was a judge in the JTBC talent show Superband.

In 2021, he will become the main host of Mysterious Record Shop. The other co-host will be Wendy, Kyuhyun, and Jang Yoon Jung.

A live recording of Yoon's song "Uphill Road" was released as a digital single on August 1, 2025.

== Personal life ==
Yoon married former professional tennis player Jeon Mi-ra in 2006. They have three children Yoon Ra-ik, Yoon Ra-im and Yoon Ra-oh together. In July 2020, Yoon rushed back to Korea to tend to his ill mother, and she died in September of that year.

== Discography ==
=== Studio albums ===
Title	Album details	Peak chart positions		Sales
Title	Album details	KOR RIAK	KOR Gaon	Sales
Like the First Time We Met (처음 만날 때처럼)	Released: May 12, 1991; Label: Daeyoung AV; Format: CD, cassette	—N/a	—N/a	
Sorrow	Released: November 15, 1992; Label: Daeyoung AV; Format: CD, cassette	—N/a	—N/a	
The Natural	Released: August 12, 1993; Label: Daeyoung AV; Format: CD, cassette	—N/a	—N/a	
Coexistence (공존)	Released: April 1995; Label: Daeyoung AV; Format: CD, cassette	—N/a	—N/a	
Stupid (우)	Released: April 1996; Label: Daeyoung AV; Format: CD, cassette	—N/a	—N/a	
Six Years (육년)	Released: November 1996; Label: Daeyoung AV; Format: CD, cassette	—N/a	—N/a	
The Latter Half (후반)	Released: January 14, 1999; Label: EMI Korea; Format: CD, cassette	8	—N/a	KOR: 107,274
A Guidebook for Brokenhearted People (헤어진 사람들을 위한 지침서)	Released: March 23, 2000; Label: EMI Korea; Format: CD, cassette	8	—N/a	KOR: 98,128
Dusk (그늘)	Released: July 6, 2001; Label: Corner Stone; Format: CD, cassette	—	—N/a	
Behind the Smile	Released: April 12, 2005; Label: T Entertainment; Format: CD, cassette	6	—N/a	KOR: 23,334
Round the Village (동네 한 바퀴)	Released: November 17, 2008; Label: Danal Entertainment; Format: CD, digital download	—N/a	—N/a	
Monthly Project 2010 Yoon Jong Shin (行步 2010 Yoon Jong Shin)	Released: October 28, 2010; Label: CJ E&M; Format: CD, digital download	—N/a	—	
Monthly Project 2011 Yoon Jong Shin (行步 2011 尹鍾信)	Released: December 6, 2011; Label: Mystic89; Format: CD, digital download	—N/a	—	
Monthly Project 2012 Yoon Jong Shin (행보 2012 윤종신)	Released: January 3, 2013; Label: Mystic89; Format: CD, digital download	—N/a	—	
Monthly Project 2013 Yoon Jong Shin (행보 2013 윤종신)	Released: December 12, 2013; Label: Mystic89; Format: CD, digital download	—N/a	7	KOR: 4,132
Monthly Project 2014 Yoon Jong Shin (행보 2014 윤종신)	Released: January 16, 2015; Label: Mystic89; Format: CD, digital download	—N/a	4	KOR: 1,916
Monthly Project 2015 Yoon Jong Shin (행보 2015 윤종신)	Released: January 20, 2016; Label: Mystic89; Format: CD, digital download	—N/a	12	KOR: 1,754
Monthly Project 2016 Yoon Jong Shin (행보 2016 윤종신)	Released: January 19, 2017; Label: Mystic89; Format: CD, digital download	—N/a	23	KOR: 1,391
Monthly Project 2017 Yoon Jong Shin (행보 2017 윤종신)	Released: January 26, 2018; Label: Mystic89; Format: CD, digital download	—N/a	24	KOR: 1,614
Monthly Project 2018 Yoon Jong Shin (행보 2018 윤종신)	Released: January 11, 2019; Label: Mystic89; Format: CD, digital download	—N/a	28	KOR: 1,302
Monthly Project 2019 Yoon Jong Shin (행보 2019 윤종신)	Released: January 30, 2020; Label: Mystic Story; Format: CD, digital download	—N/a	39	
"—" denotes release did not chart.

=== Charted songs ===
Title	Year	Peak chart positions	Album
Title	Year	KOR	Album
"Can't Live Without You" (그대 없이는 못살아)	2010	82	Monthly Project 2010 Yoon Jong Shin
"King of Regret" (후회 王) (feat. Kim Yeon-woo)	2010	88	Monthly Project 2010 Yoon Jong Shin
"By Instinct" (본능적으로) (feat. Swings)	2010	14	Monthly Project 2010 Yoon Jong Shin
"The Temperature of Separation" (이별의 온도)	2010	93	Monthly Project 2010 Yoon Jong Shin
"Bar Bar Bar" (바바바 (부제: 화해송)) (feat. Lee Sang-soon)	2011	97	Monthly Project 2011 Yoon Jong Shin
"Living Without You" (너 없이 산다) (feat. Lee Hyun-woo)	2011	78	Monthly Project 2011 Yoon Jong Shin
"Two Farewells" (두 이별) (feat. Lee Jung)	2011	66	Monthly Project 2011 Yoon Jong Shin
"Horse Tail" (말꼬리) (feat. Jeong Joon-Il)	2011	86	Monthly Project 2011 Yoon Jong Shin
"Your Thought" (니 생각) (feat. Kim Greem, Shinchireem)	2011	94	Monthly Project 2011 Yoon Jong Shin
"My Ugly Love" (못나고 못난)	2011	76	Monthly Project 2011 Yoon Jong Shin
"Late Autumn" (늦가을) (feat. Kyuhyun)	2011	58	Monthly Project 2011 Yoon Jong Shin
"Age" (나이)	2011	52	Monthly Project 2011 Yoon Jong Shin
"Feel Good" (느낌 Good) (feat. Jang Jae-in)	2012	45	Monthly Project 2012 Yoon Jong Shin
"Festival for Missing" (그리움 축제) (feat. Horan)	2012	89	Monthly Project 2012 Yoon Jong Shin
"Uphill Road" (오르막길) (with Jung-in)	2012	41	Monthly Project 2012 Yoon Jong Shin
"Bad" (나쁜) (with Yoon Sang)	2012	98	Monthly Project 2012 Yoon Jong Shin
"Merry Christmas Only You"	2012	89	Monthly Project 2012 Yoon Jong Shin
"History of Love" (사랑의 역사)	2013	92	Monthly Project 2013 Yoon Jong Shin
"Tomorrow" (내일 할 일) (with Sung Si-kyung)	2013	17	Monthly Project 2013 Yoon Jong Shin
"No Schedule" (with Kim Yeon-woo)	2013	49	Monthly Project 2013 Yoon Jong Shin
"Going to You" (너에게 간다) (with Kim Bum-soo)	2013	52	Monthly Project 2013 Yoon Jong Shin
"Red Bean Sherbet" (팥빙수) (with J Rabbit)	2013	97	Monthly Project 2013 Yoon Jong Shin
"Goodbye" (굿바이) (with Park Ji-yoon)	2013	60	Monthly Project 2013 Yoon Jong Shin
"Annie" (with Sweet Sorrow)	2013	95	Monthly Project 2013 Yoon Jong Shin
"One Day Long Ago" (오래전 그날) (with Lee Juck)	2013	78	Monthly Project 2013 Yoon Jong Shin
"Wild Boy" (with Kang Seung-yoon, Mino)	2014	32	Monthly Project 2014 Yoon Jong Shin
"New You" (with Lim Seul-ong)	2014	61	Monthly Project 2014 Yoon Jong Shin
"Bat Girl" (with Younha)	2014	89	Monthly Project 2014 Yoon Jong Shin
"Goyo" (고요) (with Jeong Joon-Il)	2014	58	Monthly Project 2014 Yoon Jong Shin
"Happy Tears" (행복한 눈물)	2014	93	Monthly Project 2014 Yoon Jong Shin
"Exhausted" (지친 하루) (with Kwak Jin-eon, Kim Feel)	2014	13	Monthly Project 2014 Yoon Jong Shin
"The Color" (with Beenzino)	2015	54	Monthly Project 2015 Yoon Jong Shin
"Good Night" (굿나잇) (with Eddy Kim)	2015	82	Monthly Project 2015 Yoon Jong Shin
"Over Sleep" (늦잠) (with Ken of VIXX)	2016	88	Monthly Project 2016 Yoon Jong Shin
"Wi-Fi" (with Zico)	2017	79	Monthly Project 2017 Yoon Jong Shin
"Like It" (좋니)	2017	1	Monthly Project 2017 Yoon Jong Shin
"Yes" (좋아) (with Minseo)	2017	1	Monthly Project 2017 Yoon Jong Shin
"The Coldness" (추위) (with Jung-in)	2017	84	Monthly Project 2017 Yoon Jong Shin
"Trace" (너를 찾아서)	2017	9	Hyena on the Keyboard OST

== Filmography ==
=== Television shows ===
Year	Title	Notes/Ref.
2007–2019	Radio Star	Host
2008	Family Outing	Member
2013	Barefoot Friends	Member
2016–2017	Secretly Greatly	Host
2017–2018, 2023	Heart Signal	Host
2018–present	Movieroom	Host
2019	Super Hearer	Hearer
2019	Superband	judge
2021	Painting Thieves	Cast Member
2021	Sea of Hope	Cast member/Music
2021	Superband 2	Judge
2021	Poetry that become a song	Host
2021	ZipCon Live	Host
2022	Mischief Job 2	Host
2022	Youth Star	Youth mentor
2022	New Festa	Host
2023	Phantom Singer 4	Judge
2023	Sing Again 3	Judge

=== Web shows ===
Year	Title	Role	Ref.
2022	Spectator +: Short Buster	Host	

=== Film ===
2007 Project Makeover - Mr.Yoon

== Awards and nominations ==
Year	Award	Category	Nominated work	Result	Ref.
1995	SBS Star Awards	Radio MC Award	—N/a	Won	
1999	Mnet Video Music Awards	Best Ballad	"Send Off" (배웅)	Nominated	
2005	MBC Drama Awards	Excellence Award in Radio	2 O'Clock Date	Won	
2009	MBC Entertainment Awards	Excellence Award in Comedy or Sitcom	Taehee, Hyekyo, Jihyun!	Won	
2011	Cyworld Digital Music Awards	Tam Eum Mania Award (January)	"Happy New Year...With You"	Won	
2011	MBC Entertainment Awards	Producer's Award	—N/a	Won	
2012	MBC Entertainment Awards	Top Excellence Award in Variety	Radio Star	Won	
2014	MBC Entertainment Awards	Top Excellence Award in Music or Talk Show	Radio Star	Won	
2016	MBC Entertainment Awards	Special Award in Music or Talk Show	Radio Star	Won	
2017	Gaon Chart Music Awards	K-Pop Contribution Award	—N/a	Won	
2017	Gaon Chart Music Awards	Popular Singer of the Year	"Like It" (좋니)	Won	
2017	Melon Music Awards	Ballad Award	"Like It" (좋니)	Won	
2017	Mnet Asian Music Awards	Best Male Artist	"Like It" (좋니)	Nominated	
2017	Mnet Asian Music Awards	Best Vocal Performance	"Like It" (좋니)	Won	
2018	Golden Disc Awards	Digital Song Bonsang	"Like It" (좋니)	Won	
2018	Seoul Music Awards	Record of the Year in Digital Release	"Like It" (좋니)	Won	
2018	MBC Entertainment Awards	Top Excellence Award in Music or Talk Show	Radio Star	Won	
2019	Genie Music Awards	The Innovator Award	Monthly Project album series	Won	
