= Lee Juck =

South Korean singer-songwriter (born 1974)

Lee Juck 이적
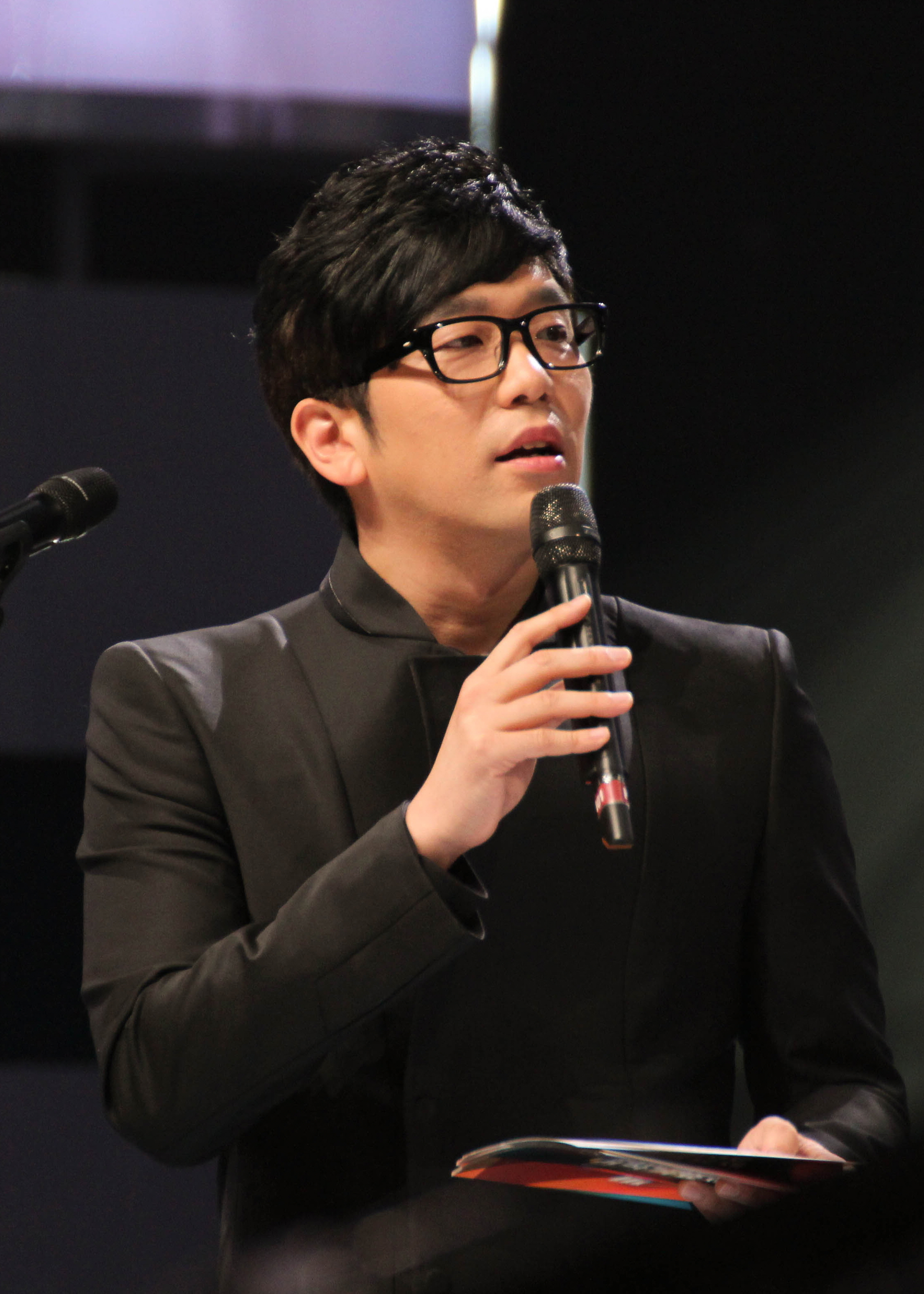
- Lee in November 2012

Background information
- Born: Lee Dongjoon (이동준); February 28, 1974 (age 52)
- Origin: Seoul, South Korea
- Genres: Pop, folk rock, funk, rock&roll
- Years active: 1995–present
- Label: Music Farm
- Website: leejuck.com

Lee Juck (Korean: 이적; born February 28, 1974) is a South Korean singer, lyricist, composer and arranger.

== Biography ==
Lee Juck was born in Seoul and attended Banpo High School. He graduated from Seoul National University with a major in sociology. He made his debut as a member of Panic with his neighborhood buddy Kim Jin-pyo in 1995 and worked with Kim Dong-ryul as a project band Carnival in 1997. In 1999, he released his first solo album Dead End. His third album 나무로 만든 노래 (Songs Made of Wood) won the "Album of the Year", "Song of the Year", "Best Pop Album" and "Best Pop Song" from the Korean Music Awards in 2008.

Besides being a musician, Lee is a radio DJ of major radio shows in South Korea, for example, 별이 빛나는 밤에 (At starry night) of MBC AM (1996–1998), Ten-Ten Club of SBS FM (2008–2009) and so on.

In 2005, he published a collection of short fantasy fictions entitled 지문 사냥꾼 (Fingerprint Hunter), and one of the episode 제불찰씨 이야기 (The story of Mr. Self-fault) was made as an animation in 2007.

He featured as a medical doctor of a colorectal surgery clinic in a sitcom TV show High Kick: Revenge of the Short Legged of MBC from 2011.

In December 2007, Lee married Jeong Ok-hee (ballerina). In 2010, Lee and his wife welcomed their first daughter and their second daughter in 2013.

== Philanthropy ==
On December 6, 2022, Lee donated 50 million won to support the hearing impaired through Snail of Love.

== Discography ==
=== Studio albums ===
Title	Album details	Peak chart positions		Sales
Title	Album details	KOR RIAK	KOR Gaon	Sales
Dead End	Released: June 24, 1999; Label: K&C Music Publishing Co.; Formats: CD, cassette	29	—	KOR: 72,765
2 Juck (2적)	Released: May 12, 2003; Label: Ein Media; Formats: LP, CD, cassette	8	15	KOR: 80,054
Songs Made of Wood (나무로 만든 노래)	Released: April 19, 2007; Label: Music Farm; Formats: CD	5	35	KOR: 27,232
Love (사랑)	Released: September 30, 2010; Label: Music Farm; Formats: CD, digital download	—N/a	4	KOR: 26,549
The Meaning of Solitude (고독의 의미)	Released: November 15, 2013; Label: Music Farm; Formats: CD, digital download	—N/a	3	KOR: 15,229
Trace	Released: November 11, 2020; Label: Music Farm; Formats: LP, CD, digital download	—N/a	30	KOR: 3,265

=== Singles ===
Title	Year	Peak chart positions	Sales (Digital)	Album
Title	Year	KOR	Sales (Digital)	Album
"Rain"	1999	—		Dead End
"Run Across The Sky" (하늘을 달리다)	2003	36		2 Juck
"I Didn't Know That Time" (그땐 미처 알지 못했지)	2003	23	KOR: 341,100	2 Juck
"It's Fortunate" (다행이다)	2007	—		Songs Made of Wood
"Laundry" (빨래)	2010	22		Love
"With You" (그대랑)	2010	18		Love
"Lie Lie Lie" (거짓말 거짓말 거짓말)	2013	2	KOR: 950,196	The Meaning of Solitude
"A Day Long Ago" (오래전 그날) (with Yoon Jong-shin)	2013	78	KOR: 30,372	Monthly Project 2013 Yoon Jong Shin
"40 Something" (나는 지금...)	2014	—	KOR: 20,619	Non-album singles
"Flower Vase" (꽃병) (with Yang Hee-eun)	2014	—		Non-album singles
"Compass" (나침반)	2017	38	KOR: 81,170	Trace
"Numbers" (숫자)	2019	—		Trace
"Things We Took For Granted" (당연한 것들)	2020	— (Note: "Things We Took For Granted" did not enter the Gaon Digital Chart, but it peaked at No. 50 on the component Gaon Download Chart.)		Trace
"Stoning" (돌팔매) (feat. Kim Jin-pyo)	2020	— (Note: "Stoning" did not enter the Gaon Digital Chart, but it peaked at No. 36 on the component Gaon Download Chart.)		Trace

=== Soundtrack appearances ===
Title	Year	Peak chart positions	Sales (Digital)	Album
Title	Year	KOR	Sales (Digital)	Album
"Gift" (선물)	2008	—		Gourmet OST
"Smile, My Love" (웃어라 그대) (with Kang Seung-yoon	2012	79	KOR: 58,394	High Kick 3 OST
"Don't Worry Dear" (걱정말아요 그대)	2015	3	KOR: 2,137,284	Reply 1988 OST
"Interlocked Fingers" (깍지)	2016	47	KOR: 53,056	Love in the Moonlight OST
"The Opposite Side" (반대편)	2023			Crash Course in Romance OST

=== Other charted songs ===
Title	Year	Peak chart positions	Sales (Digital)	Album
Title	Year	KOR	Sales (Digital)	Album
"Walk With Me" (같이 걸을까)	2007	28		Songs Made of Wood
"Uncle" (삼촌) (with IU)	2011	4		Last Fantasy
"Disease" (병)	2013	80	KOR: 51,252	The Meaning of Solitude
"What Do You See" (뭐가 보여)	2013	78	KOR: 51,535	The Meaning of Solitude
"Some Like It Hot" (뜨거운 것이 좋아)	2013	75	KOR: 52,227	The Meaning of Solitude
"Hide And Seek" (숨바꼭질)	2013	79	KOR: 51,806	The Meaning of Solitude
"20 Years After" (이십년이 지난 뒤)	2013	56	KOR: 63,047	The Meaning of Solitude
"The Meaning of Solitude" (고독의 의미)	2013	48	KOR: 65,463	The Meaning of Solitude
"Is There Anybody" (누가 있나요)	2013	49	KOR: 66,492	The Meaning of Solitude
"What Is Love" (사랑이 뭐길래) (feat. Tiger JK)	2013	44	KOR: 82,796	The Meaning of Solitude
"Before Sunrise" (비포 선라이즈) (with Jung-in)	2013	9	KOR: 256,102	The Meaning of Solitude

== Filmography ==
=== Television series ===
Year	English Title	Original Title	Role	Notes	Ref.
2011–2012	High Kick 3	짧은 다리의 역습	Dr. Lee Jeok		

=== Television shows ===
Year	Title	Role	Notes	Ref.
2013	Enemy of Broadcasting	Host		
2014	Youth Over Flowers	Cast Member		
2017	Change The Class	Host		
2018	Cafè Amor	Celebrity server		
2019	Begin Again 3	Cast Member		
2020	Top 10 Student	MC		
2021	Joseon Top Singer	Judge		
2021	Off the Record	Host		
2022	Mystery Duet	Host		

=== Web shows ===
Year	Title	Role	Ref.
2022	Boyfriend Love	Host	

== Bibliography ==
- Lee Juck (2005). 몽상만화: 지문 사냥꾼 [Fantasy Comic: Fingerprint Hunter] (in Korean). (illusted by) Park Yoonseon, Lee Gangju, Lee Aerim, Song Dongkeun, Lee Hyangwoo. Woongjin Knowledge House. ISBN 978-89-01-06176-4.
- Lee Juck (2005). 지문 사냥꾼 [Fingerprint Hunter] (in Korean). Woongjin Knowledge House. ISBN 978-89-01-04984-7.

== Accolades ==
=== Awards and nominations ===
Year	Award	Category	Nominated work	Result	Ref.
2003	Mnet Music Video Festival	Best Male Artist	"I Didn't Know That Time" (그땐 미처 알지 못했지)	Nominated	
2004	Korean Music Awards	Musician of the Year (Male)	Lee Juck	Nominated	
2007	Mnet Km Music Festival	Best Male Artist	"It's Fortunate" (다행이다)	Nominated	
2008	Korean Music Awards	Song of the Year	"It's Fortunate" (다행이다)	Won	
2008	Korean Music Awards	Best Pop Song	"It's Fortunate" (다행이다)	Won	
2008	Korean Music Awards	Album of the Year	Songs Made of Wood	Won	
2008	Korean Music Awards	Best Pop Album	Songs Made of Wood	Won	
2008	Korean Music Awards	Musician of the Year	Lee Juck	Nominated	
2014	Korean Music Awards	Best Pop Song	"Lie Lie Lie" (거짓말 거짓말 거짓말)	Nominated	
2016	Mnet Asian Music Awards	Best Original Soundtrack	"Don't Worry Dear" (걱정말아요 그대)	Won	

=== State honors ===
Name of country, year given, and name of honor
Country	Year	Honor	Ref.
South Korea (Note: Honors are given at the Korean Popular Culture and Arts Awards, arranged by the Korea Creative Content Agency and hosted by the Ministry of Culture, Sports and Tourism. They are awarded to those who have contributed to the arts and South Korea's pop culture.)	2021	Presidential Commendation	

== See also ==
- Music Farm
