= Music Farm (record label) =

- Founded: 2002
- Founder: Kang Tae-kyu
- Distributor(s): Kakao Entertainment
- Genre: K-pop; Modern rock Folk rock Synthpop
- Country of origin: South Korea
- Location: Seoul
- Official website: http://www.musicfarm.co.kr

Music Farm (Korean: 뮤직팜) is a Korean pop record label, founded with the band Cherry Filter as a name of Farm Entertainment in 2002.

== Background ==
In 2001, producer Lee Guk-hyun met the modern rock group Cherry Filter in a live club at Hongdae and started the agency 'Farm Entertainment' by producing the band's 2nd album. The album succeeded and the unknown band became one of the leader in K-pop modern rock scene. The agency was expanded and produced the albums of Kim Jin-pyo, Kim Dong-ryool and other musicians and in 2005, the name was changed to Music Farm. Recently John Park, the semi-finalist of American Idol 9, joined the label.

== Artists ==
=== Current ===
==== Groups ====
- Cherry Filter

==== Soloists ====
- Lee Juck
- Kim Dong-ryool
- John Park
- Kwak Jin-eon

=== Former ===
- Kim Jin-pyo
- Lee Sang-soon
- Cho Won-seon
- Jung Soon-yong
